= 2023 World Triathlon Championship Series =

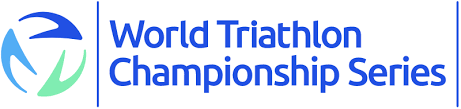
- League: World Triathlon Championship Series
- Sport: Triathlon

Men's Series
- Series Champion: (France) Dorian Coninx (FRA)
- Points: 4237.60 Points

Women's Series
- Series Champion: (United Kingdom) Beth Potter (GBR)
- Points: 4559.38 Points

World Triathlon Championship Series seasons
- 2022 2024

The 2023 World Triathlon Championship Series was the 15th season of the World Triathlon Championship Series, the top level international series for triathlon, since its establishment in 2009, and crowned the 35th official World Triathlon Champion for both men and women since the first was crowned in 1989.

The season consisted of seven pairs of triathlon races for both a men's and women's competition, beginning on 3 March 2023 in Abu Dhabi, and concluding on 24 September 2023 with the grand final in Pontevedra. The World Champion is decided on a cumulative points basis, with the sum of their four best points scores, plus their score in Pontevedra, deciding the series rankings, medalists and champions. In addition, a mixed relay only event was held in Paris as a test event for the 2024 Summer Olympics, doubling as a qualifier. Junior, under-23, age-grade and sprint and mixed relay world championships were held at several of the events.

In 2022, the Montreal leg introduced a super-sprint eliminator format, and hosted both the official World Triathlon Mixed Relay Championships and World Triathlon Sprint Championships; which crowned the third World Triathlon Sprint champion for both men and women, and the Mixed Relay champion team. In 2023 these events were moved to the Hamburg leg on 15 and 16 July, although a mixed relay was still held in Montreal. Unlike Hamburg, however, the Hamburg individual triathlon was held over the traditional 'sprint' or half-standard distance rather than the multiple-race eliminator format.

The grand final was held in Pontevedra with increased points and prize money to round off the series.

== Overview ==
=== Calendar ===
The 2023 World Triathlon Championship Series visited seven cities.

Events
Date	Location	Type	Other events at same leg
March 3–4	(United Arab Emirates) Abu Dhabi	Sprint	
May 13–14	(Japan) Yokohama	Standard	
October 7–8	(Italy) Cagliari	Standard	
June 25–26	(Canada) Montreal	Sprint	Mixed relay
July 15–16	(Germany) Hamburg	Eliminator	Sprint World Championships; Mixed Relay World Championships; Junior World Sprint Championships; Age-grade World Championships
July 29–30	(United Kingdom) Sunderland	Sprint	Mixed relay
August 20	(France) Paris	Mixed relay only	Mixed relay (Olympic qualifier)
September 23–26	(Spain) Pontevedra	Standard; WTCS Grand Final	World Para-triathlon Championships; Under-23 World Championships

Mixed Relays
Date	Location	Type
June 26	(Canada) Montreal	
July 16	(Germany) Hamburg	World Mixed Relay Championships
July 30	(United Kingdom) Sunderland	
August 20	(France) Paris	Olympic mixed relay qualifier

== Results ==
=== Championship series summary (elite) ===
==== Men ====
Event	Gold	Silver	Bronze
Abu Dhabi	Alex Yee; Great Britain	Vasco Vilaça; Portugal	Manoel Messias; Brazil
Yokohama	Hayden Wilde; New Zealand	Matthew Hauser; Australia	Vasco Vilaça; Portugal
Cagliari	Alex Yee; Great Britain	Hayden Wilde; New Zealand	Léo Bergere; France
Montreal	Matthew Hauser; Australia	Manoel Messias; Brazil	Jelle Geens; Belgium
Hamburg *	Hayden Wilde; New Zealand	Vasco Vilaça; Portugal	Alex Yee; Great Britain
Sunderland	Pierre Le Corre; France	Léo Bergere; France	Hayden Wilde; New Zealand
Pontevedra^{Grand Final}	Dorian Coninx; France	Tim Hellwig; Germany	Pierre Le Corre; France
Overall^{World Championship}	Dorian Coninx; France	Hayden Wilde; New Zealand	Léo Bergere; France

* The Hamburg event, held in super-sprint eliminator format, doubled as the stand-alone World Triathlon Sprint Championships.

==== Women ====
Event	Gold	Silver	Bronze
Abu Dhabi	Beth Potter; Great Britain	Sophie Coldwell; Great Britain	Taylor Spivey; United States
Yokohama	Sophie Coldwell; Great Britain	Rosa Maria Tapia Vidal; Mexico	Taylor Knibb; United States
Cagliari	Georgia Taylor-Brown; Great Britain	Emma Lombardi; France	Taylor Spivey; United States
Montreal	Beth Potter; Great Britain	Léonie Périault; France	Summer Rappaport; United States
Hamburg *	Cassandre Beaugrand; France	Beth Potter; Great Britain	Laura Lindemann; Germany
Sunderland	Cassandre Beaugrand; France	Emma Lombardi; France	Annika Koch; Germany
Pontevedra^{Grand Final}	Beth Potter; Great Britain	Kate Waugh; Great Britain	Cassandre Beaugrand; France
Overall^{World Championship}	Beth Potter; Great Britain	Cassandre Beaugrand; France	Emma Lombardi; France

* The Hamburg event, held in super-sprint eliminator format, doubled as the stand-alone World Triathlon Sprint Championships.

==== World Triathlon Sprint Championship ====
The event was held as a leg of the World Triathlon Championship Series in Hamburg, in conjunction with the World Mixed Relay Championships.

Event	Gold	Silver	Bronze
Hamburg; Men's championship	Hayden Wilde; New Zealand	Vasco Vilaça; Portugal	Alex Yee; Great Britain
Hamburg; Women's Championship	Cassandre Beaugrand; France	Beth Potter; Great Britain	Laura Lindemann; Germany

==== World Triathlon Mixed Relay Championship ====
Event	Gold	Silver	Bronze
Sunderland	France; Tom Richard; Emma Lombardi; Pierre Le Corre; Cassandre Beaugrand	Great Britain; Barclay Izzard; Beth Potter; Max Stapley; Jessica Fullagar	Norway; Vetle Bergsvik Thorn; Lotte Miller; Casper Stornes; Solveig Løvseth
Montreal	cancelled due to forest fires in Quebec		
Hamburg^{World Championship}	Germany; Tim Hellwig; Annika Koch; Simon Henseleit; Laura Lindemann	New Zealand; Hayden Wilde; Ainsley Thorpe; Tayler Reid; Nicole Van Der Kaay	Switzerland; Max Studer; Julie Derron; Sylvain Fridelance; Cathia Schär

Paris test event and Olympic qualifier

Event	Gold	Silver	Bronze
Paris; Olympic qualifier	Germany; Tim Hellwig; Lisa Tertsch; Jonas Schomburg; Laura Lindemann	Great Britain; Barclay Izzard; Kate Waugh; Alex Yee; Beth Potter	Belgium; Arnaud Mengal; Jolien Vermeylen; Jelle Geens; Claire Michel

== Race Results ==
=== Abu Dhabi ===
Men

Rank	Athlete	Swim	T1	Bike	T1	Run	Total time
1st place, gold medalist(s)	Alex Yee (GBR)	9:20	1:14	27:33	0:23	14:26	0:52:53
2nd place, silver medalist(s)	Vasco Vilaça (POR)	9:17	1:14	27:35	0:22	14:32	0:52:59
3rd place, bronze medalist(s)	Manoel Messias (BRA)	9:40	1:14	27:15	0:27	14:32	0:53:06
4	Vincent Luis (FRA)	8:57	1:15	27:54	0:22	14:45	0:53:11
6	Dorian Coninx (FRA)	8:59	1:14	27:53	0:22	14:48	0:53:14
5	Léo Bergere (FRA)	9:21	1:16	27:28	0:21	14:51	0:53:15
7	Roberto Sanchez Mantecon (ESP)	9:26	1:16	27:23	0:23	14:52	0:53:18
8	Matthew McElroy (USA)	9:31	1:13	27:23	0:22	14:52	0:53:19
9	Max Studer (SUI)	9:32	1:16	27:22	0:21	14:51	0:53:20
10	Adrien Briffod (SUI)	9:30	1:14	27:25	0:21	14:57	0:53:24

Women

Rank	Athlete	Swim	T1	Bike	T1	Run	Total time
1st place, gold medalist(s)	Beth Potter (GBR)	9:40	1:18	29:52	0:24	16:46	0:57:56
2nd place, silver medalist(s)	Sophie Coldwell (GBR)	9:27	1:28	29:54	0:23	17:04	0:58:14
3rd place, bronze medalist(s)	Taylor Spivey (USA)	9:35	1:19	29:55	0:24	17:18	0:58:27
4	Summer Rappaport (USA)	9:31	1:20	29:59	0:24	17:24	0:58:35
6	Cassandre Beaugrand (FRA)	9:52	1:23	30:23	0:26	16:38	0:58:39
5	Lena Meissner (GER)	9:33	1:21	29:56	0:24	17:29	0:58:39
7	Nina Eim (GER)	10:16	1:18	30:00	0:23	16:51	0:58:45
8	Emma Lombardi (FRA)	9:58	1:22	30:15	0:23	16:50	0:58:46
9	Verena Steinhauser (ITA)	10:03	1:21	30:10	0:22	16:55	0:58:48
10	Lisa Tertsch (GER)	10:18	1:17	29:59	0:24	16:59	0:58:53

=== Yokohama ===
Men

Rank	Athlete	Swim	T1	Bike	T1	Run	Total time
1st place, gold medalist(s)	Hayden Wilde (NZL)	17:26	0:59	53:57	0:23	29:30	1:42:13
2nd place, silver medalist(s)	Matthew Hauser (AUS)	17:13	1:01	54:13	0:23	29:29	1:42:17
3rd place, bronze medalist(s)	Vasco Vilaça (POR)	17:22	1:03	53:59	0:33	29:24	1:42:18
4	Dorian Coninx (FRA)	17:17	1:01	54:07	0:22	29:38	1:42:22
6	Léo Bergere (FRA)	17:17	1:03	54:02	0:22	29:45	1:42:26
5	Adrien Briffod (SUI)	17:45	1:03	53:38	0:21	29:52	1:42:37
7	Jelle Geens (BEL)	17:47	1:02	53:34	0:21	30:00	1:42:42
8	Kristian Blummenfelt (NOR)	17:54	1:08	53:20	0:26	30:02	1:42:48
9	Csongor Lehmann (HUN)	17:21	1:04	54:00	0:25	30:05	1:42:53
10	Henri Schoeman (RSA)	17:22	1:02	54:04	0:25	30:10	1:43:01

Women

Rank	Athlete	Swim	T1	Bike	T1	Run	Total Time
1st place, gold medalist(s)	Sophie Coldwell (GBR)	18:38	1:06	59:31	0:26	33:53	1:53:32
2nd place, silver medalist(s)	Rosa Maria Tapia Vidal (MEX)	18:47	1:02	59:27	0:27	34:08	1:53:49
3rd place, bronze medalist(s)	Taylor Knibb (USA)	18:37	1:10	59:29	0:31	34:17	1:54:02
4	Taylor Spivey (USA)	18:43	1:07	59:24	0:26	34:35	1:54:14
6	Kate Waugh (GBR)	18:38	1:03	59:35	0:27	34:39	1:54:20
5	Maya Kingma (NED)	18:35	1:08	59:33	0:26	35:00	1:54:40
7	Georgia Taylor-Brown (GBR)	19:06	1:06	1:34	0:28	33:35	1:54:48
8	Kirsten Kasper (USA)	18:41	0:59	59:35	0:31	35:19	1:55:03
9	Emma Lombardi (FRA)	19:15	1:02	1:29	0:28	33:58	1:55:10
10	Summer Rappaport (USA)	18:36	1:03	1:1:11	0:30	34:11	1:55:30

=== Cagliari ===
Men

Rank	Athlete	Swim	T1	Bike	T1	Run	Total time
1st place, gold medalist(s)	Alex Yee (GBR)	17:22	0:36	49:38	0:23	28:31	1:36:28
2nd place, silver medalist(s)	Hayden Wilde (NZL)	17:22	0:38	49:36	0:23	28:35	1:36:33
3rd place, bronze medalist(s)	Léo Bergere (FRA)	17:23	0:39	49:34	0:20	29:11	1:37:04
4	Dorian Coninx (FRA)	17:10	0:35	49:50	0:19	29:22	1:37:15
6	Pierre Le Corre (FRA)	17:21	0:37	49:39	0:20	29:27	1:37:21
5	Jonas Schomburg (GER)	17:16	0:35	49:44	0:21	29:45	1:37:39
7	Csongor Lehmann (HUN)	17:24	0:35	49:36	0:22	29:57	1:37:52
8	Vasco Vilaça (POR)	17:16	0:35	49:45	0:22	30:03	1:37:58
9	Kenji Nener (JPN)	17:18	0:35	49:42	0:20	30:05	1:38:00
10	Lasse Lührs (GER)	17:23	0:36	49:37	0:20	30:10	1:38:04

Women

Rank	Athlete	Swim	T1	Bike	T1	Run	Total times
1st place, gold medalist(s)	Georgia Taylor-Brown (GBR)	18:18	0:38	54:41	0:23	32:45	1:46:43
2nd place, silver medalist(s)	Emma Lombardi (FRA)	18:11	0:39	54:46	0:23	33:10	1:47:06
3rd place, bronze medalist(s)	Taylor Spivey (USA)	18:17	0:38	54:41	0:24	33:38	1:47:36
4	Cassandre Beaugrand (FRA)	18:33	0:41	55:44	0:23	32:25	1:47:44
6	Jeanne Lehair (LUX)	18:40	0:40	55:39	0:23	32:40	1:48:00
5	Beth Potter (GBR)	18:46	0:40	55:34	0:25	32:41	1:48:04
7	Summer Rappaport (USA)	18:09	0:43	54:44	0:22	34:14	1:48:12
8	Lisa Tertsch (GER)	18:28	0:37	55:54	0:25	33:29	1:48:51
9	Nina Eim (GER)	18:45	0:37	55:36	0:24	33:35	1:48:55
10	Rosa Maria Tapia Vidal (MEX)	18:46	0:40	55:35	0:22	33:36	1:48:57

=== Montreal ===
Men

Rank	Athlete	Swim	T1	Bike	T1	Run	Total Time
1st place, gold medalist(s)	Matthew Hauser (AUS)	8:02	1:42	29:10	0:32	14:23	53:47
2nd place, silver medalist(s)	Manoel Messias (BRA)	8:32	1:40	28:44	0:36	14:29	53:58
3rd place, bronze medalist(s)	Jelle Geens (BEL)	8:29	1:44	28:40	0:34	14:38	54:02
4	Tim Hellwig (GER)	8:06	1:42	29:04	0:35	14:37	54:03
6	Kristian Blummenfelt (NOR)	8:36	1:44	28:32	0:36	14:40	54:05
5	Bence Bicsák (HUN)	8:22	1:45	28:46	0:32	14:45	54:07
7	Charles Paquet (CAN)	8:22	1:42	28:50	0:40	14:39	54:10
8	Roberto Sanchez Mantecon (ESP)	8:38	1:40	28:33	0:31	14:53	54:15
9	Marten Van Riel (BEL)	8:11	1:39	29:03	0:34	14:53	54:18
10	Kenji Nener (JPN)	8:04	1:44	29:04	0:34	14:55	54:19

Women

Rank	Athlete	Swim	T1	Bike	T1	Run	Total time
1st place, gold medalist(s)	Beth Potter (GBR)	9:22	1:47	30:17	0:37	16:08	58:10
2nd place, silver medalist(s)	Leonie Periault (FRA)	9:09	1:55	30:25	0:38	16:08	58:12
3rd place, bronze medalist(s)	Summer Rappaport (USA)	8:54	1:55	30:21	0:36	16:35	58:19
4	Jeanne Lehair (LUX)	9:23	1:50	30:14	0:38	16:25	58:28
6	Katie Zaferes (USA)	8:56	1:54	30:40	0:36	16:31	58:33
5	Taylor Knibb (USA)	8:52	2:01	30:18	0:39	16:49	58:36
7	Georgia Taylor-Brown (GBR)	9:00	1:51	30:34	0:39	16:44	58:45
8	Zsanett Kuttor-Bragmayer (HUN)	9:04	1:51	30:28	0:32	16:53	58:46
9	Taylor Spivey (USA)	8:59	1:52	30:35	0:36	16:51	58:51
10	Carolina Velásquez (COL)	9:25	1:48	30:13	0:39	16:50	58:54

=== Hamburg ===
(Finals only)

Men

Rank	Athlete	Swim	T1	Bike	T1	Run	Total time
1st place, gold medalist(s)	Hayden Wilde (NZL)	3:48	0:27	9:59	0:19	4:55	19:26
2nd place, silver medalist(s)	Vasco Vilaça (POR)	3:44	0:29	10:03	0:22	4:53	19:28
3rd place, bronze medalist(s)	Alex Yee (GBR)	3:47	0:27	10:01	0:21	4:54	19:28
4	Kristian Blummenfelt (NOR)	3:50	0:28	9:57	0:21	4:57	19:32
6	Matthew Hauser (AUS)	3:44	0:28	10:04	0:20	4:59	19:33
5	Max Studer (SUI)	3:51	0:28	9:59	0:23	5:00	19:38
7	Miguel Hidalgo (BRA)	3:45	0:36	9:56	0:21	5:05	19:41
8	Tim Hellwig (GER)	3:42	0:31	10:03	0:21	5:09	19:44
9	Tyler Mislawchuk (CAN)	3:46	0:28	10:04	0:22	5:09	19:47
10	Csongor Lehmann (HUN)	3:41	0:29	10:06	0:21	5:17	19:52

Women

Rank	Athlete	Swim	T1	Bike	T1	Run	Total time
1st place, gold medalist(s)	Cassandre Beaugrand (FRA)	4:05	0:32	11:08	0:22	5:30	21:35
2nd place, silver medalist(s)	Beth Potter (GBR)	4:07	0:34	11:03	0:22	5:42	21:45
3rd place, bronze medalist(s)	Laura Lindemann (GER)	4:05	0:31	11:09	0:23	5:41	21:47
4	Annika Koch (GER)	4:09	0:32	11:04	0:23	5:47	21:52
6	Marlene Gomez-Göggel (GER)	4:11	0:32	11:02	0:24	5:48	21:55
5	Nicole Van Der Kaay (NZL)	4:12	0:33	11:00	0:23	5:51	21:57
7	Taylor Spivey (USA)	4:07	0:33	11:05	0:23	5:54	21:59
8	Cathia Schär (SUI)	4:20	0:34	10:50	0:22	5:56	22:00
9	Jolien Vermeylen (BEL)	4:10	0:31	11:08	0:22	5:58	22:07
10	Summer Rappaport (USA)	4:05	0:34	11:10	0:23	6:21	22:30

=== Sunderland ===
Men

Rank	Athlete	Swim	T1	Bike	T1	Run	Total time
1st place, gold medalist(s)	Pierre Le Corre (FRA)	8:59	0:46	29:14	0:32	14:37	54:06
2nd place, silver medalist(s)	Léo Bergere (FRA)	8:53	0:40	29:15	0:34	14:46	54:06
3rd place, bronze medalist(s)	Hayden Wilde (NZL)	9:02	0:39	29:18	0:30	14:55	54:21
4	Vasco Vilaça (POR)	9:02	0:43	29:15	0:36	14:51	54:25
6	Richard Murray (NED)	9:06	0:40	29:16	0:37	14:50	54:27
5	Henri Schoeman (RSA)	9:02	0:46	29:13	0:34	14:56	54:28
7	Tom Richard (FRA)	8:54	0:44	29:24	0:33	14:58	54:30
8	Barclay Izzard (GBR)	9:01	0:38	29:22	0:33	15:01	54:32
9	Antonio Serrat Seoane (ESP)	8:57	0:46	29:19	0:39	14:59	54:39
10	Ricardo Batista (POR)	8:56	0:42	29:11	0:41	15:12	54:40

Women

Rank	Athlete	Swim	T1	Bike	T1	Run	Total time
1st place, gold medalist(s)	Cassandre Beaugrand (FRA)	9:20	0:41	33:09	0:35	16:10	59:53
2nd place, silver medalist(s)	Emma Lombardi (FRA)	9:28	0:41	32:58	0:34	16:33	1:00:11
3rd place, bronze medalist(s)	Annika Koch (GER)	9:31	0:41	32:55	0:38	16:34	1:00:17
4	Leonie Periault (FRA)	9:45	0:47	32:39	0:38	16:35	1:00:22
6	Marlene Gomez-Göggel (GER)	9:39	0:49	32:42	0:39	16:38	1:00:25
5	Rachel Klamer (NED)	9:39	0:45	32:44	0:35	16:49	1:00:30
7	Julie Derron (SUI)	9:43	0:47	32:37	0:36	16:52	1:00:34
8	Nicole Van Der Kaay (NZL)	9:33	0:44	32:54	0:38	16:52	1:00:38
9	Cathia Schär (SUI)	9:56	0:46	32:26	0:35	17:02	1:00:43
10	Melanie Santos (POR)	9:35	0:49	32:47	0:37	17:00	1:00:46

== Grand Final Pontevedra ==
Men

Rank	Athlete	Swim	T1	Bike	T1	Run	Total time
1st place, gold medalist(s)	Dorian Coninx (FRA)	18:03	1:15	52:56	0:25	29:46	1:42:22
2nd place, silver medalist(s)	Tim Hellwig (GER)	18:09	1:13	52:53	0:25	29:44	1:42:22
3rd place, bronze medalist(s)	Pierre Le Corre (FRA)	18:00	1:15	53:00	0:24	29:45	1:42:22
4	Léo Bergere (FRA)	18:05	1:13	52:55	0:22	29:55	1:42:28
6	Lasse Lührs (GER)	18:16	1:16	52:41	0:23	30:09	1:42:44
5	Miguel Hidalgo (BRA)	18:17	1:15	52:41	0:23	30:13	1:42:48
7	Csongor Lehmann (HUN)	18:04	1:14	52:57	0:23	30:19	1:42:54
8	Matthew Hauser (AUS)	17:57	1:15	53:00	0:21	30:31	1:43:04
9	Tyler Mislawchuk (CAN)	18:15	1:13	52:48	0:22	30:32	1:43:09
10	Hayden Wilde (NZL)	18:47	1:09	53:02	0:23	29:57	1:43:17

Women

Rank	Athlete	Swim	T1	Bike	T1	Run	Total time
1st place, gold medalist(s)	Beth Potter (GBR)	19:58	1:19	58:13	0:25	33:26	1:53:19
2nd place, silver medalist(s)	Kate Waugh (GBR)	19:59	1:20	58:09	0:27	33:44	1:53:37
3rd place, bronze medalist(s)	Cassandre Beaugrand (FRA)	19:49	1:19	58:22	0:28	33:54	1:53:50
4	Lisa Tertsch (GER)	20:10	1:15	58:16	0:29	33:53	1:54:01
6	Rachel Klamer (NED)	20:07	1:23	58:13	0:28	33:59	1:54:08
5	Emma Lombardi (FRA)	19:53	1:18	58:17	0:25	34:18	1:54:09
7	Sophie Coldwell (GBR)	19:43	1:19	58:25	0:27	34:19	1:54:12
8	Julie Derron (SUI)	20:23	1:20	57:58	0:27	34:09	1:54:14
9	Noelia Juan (ESP)	20:31	1:14	58:00	0:28	34:20	1:54:31
10	Alice Betto (ITA)	19:51	1:21	58:18	0:31	34:36	1:54:35

== Overall standings ==
In the individual events, the athlete who accumulates the most points throughout the season is declared the year's world champion.

=== Men ===
Rank	Athlete	Nation	WTCS Points	WTCS Wins	WTCS Podiums
1st place, gold medalist(s)	Dorian Coninx	France (FRA)	4,237.60	1	1
2nd place, silver medalist(s)	Hayden Wilde	New Zealand (NZL)	4,061.43	2	4
3rd place, bronze medalist(s)	Léo Bergere	France (FRA)	4,002.88	0	2
4	Vasco Vilaca	Portugal (POR)	3,703.42	0	3
5	Alex Yee	Great Britain (GBR)	3,628.99	2	3
6	Pierre le Corre	France (FRA)	3,343.07	1	2
7	Matthew Hauser	Australia (AUS)	3,239.13	1	2
8	Tim Hellwig	Germany (GER)	2,950.13	0	1
9	Kristian Blummenfelt	Norway (NOR)	2,689.11	0	0
10	Csongor Lehmann	Hungary (HUN)	2,643.25	0	0

=== Women ===
Rank	Athlete	Nation	WTCS Points	WTCS Wins	WTCS Podiums
1st place, gold medalist(s)	Beth Potter	Great Britain (GBR)	4,559.38	3	4
2nd place, silver medalist(s)	Cassandre Beaugrand	France (FRA)	4,410.98	2	3
3rd place, bronze medalist(s)	Emma Lombardi	France (FRA)	3,792.64	0	2
4	Taylor Spivey	United States (USA)	3,225.08	0	2
5	Sophie Coldwell	Great Britain (GBR)	2,998.38	1	2
6	Kate Waugh	Great Britain (GBR)	2,992.50	0	1
7	Lisa Tertsch	Germany (GER)	2,909.42	0	0
8	Jeanne Lehair	Luxembourg (LUX)	2,762.23	0	0
9	Nina Eim	Germany (GER)	2,671.77	0	0
10	Rosa Maria Tapia Vidal	Mexico (MEX)	2,486.02	0	1

== List of 2023 World Championship podiums ==
The following is a list of all the World Championship medalists crowned on the various legs of the World Triathlon Championship series. While the men and women's elite championships were decided over the full series, the Sprint, Mixed Relay, Age-grade, under-23, Junior and Para-triathlon World Championships were all decided by single races, either on the Hamburg leg (junior, sprint and both elite and u-23/Jr mixed relay) or Pontevedra grand final (Under-23 and paratriathlon).

Event	Gold	Silver	Bronze
Senior
Men's overall^{season-long}	Dorian Coninx; France	Hayden Wilde; New Zealand	Léo Bergere; France
Women's overall^{season-long}	Beth Potter; Great Britain	Cassandre Beaugrand; France	Emma Lombardi; France
Mixed relay^{Hamburg}	Germany; Tim Hellwig; Annika Koch; Simon Henseleit; Laura Lindemann	New Zealand; Hayden Wilde; Ainsley Thorpe; Tayler Reid; Nicole Van Der Kaay	Switzerland; Max Studer; Julie Derron; Sylvain Fridelance; Cathia Schär
Men's sprint^{Hamburg}	Hayden Wilde; New Zealand	Vasco Vilaça; Portugal	Alex Yee; Great Britain
Women's sprint^{Hamburg}	Cassandre Beaugrand; France	Beth Potter; Great Britain	Laura Lindemann; Germany
Age-grade
Men's U-23	Simon Henseleit; Germany	Baptiste Passemard; France	Mitch Kolkman; Netherlands
Women's U-23	Selina Klamt; Germany	Maria Tomé; Portugal	Angelica Prestia; Italy
Men's junior	João Nuno Batista; Portugal	Nils Serre Gehri; France	Mathis Beaulieu; Canada
Women's junior	Ilona Hadhoum; France	Jimena Renata de la Peña Schott; Mexico	Manon Laporte; France
Mixed relay U-23/Jr	Germany (GER)	Italy (ITA)	New Zealand (NZL)

== World Triathlon Para Championships ==
2023 World Triathlon Para Championships
- League: World Triathlon Para Championships
- Sport: Paratriathlon

Men's Series
- World Champions: PTWC : Geert Schipper; PTS2 : Jules Ribstein; PTS3 : Daniel Molina; PTS4 : Alexis Hanquinquant; PTS5 : Martin Schulz; PTVI : Dave Ellis

Women's Series
- World Champions: PTWC : Lauren Parker; PTS2 : Hailey Danz; PTS3 : Elise Marc; PTS4 : Kelly Elmlinger; PTS5 : Grace Norman; PTVI : Francesca Tarantello

Open mixed relay
- World Champions: United States (USA)

World Triathlon Para Championship seasons
- 2022 2024

The Grand Final also hosted the World Triathlon Para Championships, a series of single-race championships for paraathletes across 6 classifications, in addition to an open mixed relay event.

Event	Gold	Silver	Bronze
Para triathlon
Men's PTWC	Geert Schipper; Netherlands	Jetze Plat; Netherlands	Florian Brungraber; Austria
Men's PTS2	Jules Ribstein; France	Mohamed Lahna; United States	Maurits Morsink; Netherlands
Men's PTS3	Daniel Molina; Spain	Max Gelhaar; Germany	Cedric Denuziere; France
Men's PTS4	Alexis Hanquinquant; France	Pierre-Antoine Baele; France	Antonio Franko; Croatia
Men's PTS5	Martin Schulz; Germany	Stefan Daniel; Canada	Chris Hammer; United States
Men's PTVI	Dave Ellis; Great Britain	Thibaut Rigaudeau; France	Antoine Perel; France
Women's PTWC	Lauren Parker; Australia	Kendall Gretsch; United States	Jéssica Messali; Brazil
Women's PTS2	Hailey Danz; United States	Anu Francis; Australia	Allysa Seely; United States
Women's PTS3	Elise Marc; France	Kenia Yesenia Villalobos Vargas; Mexico	Sanne Koopman; Netherlands
Women's PTS4	Kelly Elmlinger; United States	Marta Frances Gomez; Spain	Sally Pilbeam; Australia
Women's PTS5	Grace Norman; United States	Claire Cashmore; Great Britain	Lauren Steadman; Great Britain
Women's PTVI	Francesca Tarantello; Italy	Susana Rodriguez; Spain	Annouck Curzillat; France
Open mixed PT relay	United States (USA); Kendall Gretsch; Kyle Coon; Grace Norman; Carson Clough	France (FRA); Mona Francis; Pierre-Antoine Baele; Annouck Curzillat; Alexis Hanquinquant	Brazil (BRA); Jéssica Messali; Jorge Luis Fonseca; Letícia Freitas; Ronan Cordeiro
