= 2022 World Triathlon Championship Series =

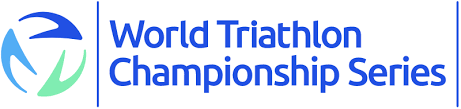
- League: ITU World Triathlon Series
- Sport: Triathlon

Men's Series
- Series Champion: (France) Léo Bergère (FRA)
- Points: 4742 Points

Women's Series
- Series Champion: (Bermuda) Flora Duffy (BER)
- Points: 5106 Points

World Triathlon Championship Series seasons
- ← 2021 2023 →

The 2022 World Triathlon Championship Series was the 14th season of the World Triathlon Championship Series, the top level international series for triathlon, since its establishment in 2009, and crowned the 34th official World Triathlon Champion for both men and women since the first was crowned in 1989.

The season consisted of seven pairs of triathlon races for both a men's and women's competition, beginning on May 14 in Yokohama, and concluding on November 26 with the grand final in Abu Dhabi. The World Champion is decided on a cumulative points basis, with the sum of their four best points scores, plus their score in Abu Dhabi, deciding the series rankings, medallists and champions.

The Montreal leg introduced a super-sprint eliminator format, and will host both the World Triathlon Mixed Relay Championships and World Triathlon Sprint Championships; which crowned the third World Triathlon Sprint champion for both men and women, and the tenth Mixed Relay champion team. Alex Yee and Georgia Taylor-Brown of Great Britain won their first World Sprint titles; it was Yee's first World title overall, while it was Taylor-Brown's second after her Elite World Championship win in 2020. France won the Mixed Relay title, while Great Britain, in silver, took the available Olympic Mixed Relay Qualification spot, as France had pre-qualified as hosts. The event included the world championship events for junior men and women, and the mixed relay world championship for junior and under-23 triathletes.

The grand final was held in Abu Dhabi with increased points and prize money to round off the series. As part of the event, Abu Dhabi also hosted the World Championships races in the elite under-23 category, and the six para-triathlon disciplines. Other non-title races were held for age-group athletes.

Kristian Blummenfelt and Flora Duffy began the season as defending champions from the 2021 season. While Blummenfelt, the 2021 Olympic, World and Ironman champion, had concentrated on the Ironman 70.3 events in 2022, winning his first World title in the discipline in 2022, and did not figure in the WTCS race shake-up, Duffy retained her WTCS world title, her fourth, to add to her 2022 Commonwealth Games title, winning over World Triathlon Sprint champion, 2022 Super League Triathlon champion and erstwhile rival Georgia Taylor-Brown in both the Abu Dhabi Grand Final and the overall standings, while Léo Bergère of France leapfrogged over pre-race standings leaders, 2022 Super League Triathlon champion Hayden Wilde and Commonwealth Games and World Sprint champion Alex Yee by winning the Grand Final race, taking his first overall title by just 20 points from Yee. The Abu Dhabi victory was Bergére's first ever in a WTCS event.

== Overview ==
=== Calendar ===
The 2022 World Triathlon Championship Series visited seven cities.

Events
Date	Location	Type
May 14–15	(Japan) Yokohama	Standard
June 11–12	(United Kingdom) Leeds	Standard
June 24–26	(Canada) Montreal	Eliminator
July 9–10	(Germany) Hamburg	Standard
October 7–8	(Italy) Cagliari	Standard
November 5–6	Bermuda	Standard
November 23–26	(United Arab Emirates) Abu Dhabi	Standard (Grand Final)

Mixed Relays
Date	Location	Type
June 12	(United Kingdom) Leeds	Mixed Relay
June 26	(Canada) Montreal	Mixed Relay
July 10	(Germany) Hamburg	Mixed Relay

== Results ==
=== Championship series summary (elite) ===
==== Men ====
Event	Gold	Silver	Bronze
Yokohama	Alex Yee (GBR)	Hayden Wilde (NZL)	Léo Bergère (FRA)
Leeds	Hayden Wilde (NZL)	Léo Bergère (FRA)	Lasse Luhrs (GER)
Montreal *	Alex Yee (GBR)	Hayden Wilde (NZL)	Léo Bergère (FRA)
Hamburg	Hayden Wilde (NZL)	Matthew Hauser (AUS)	Jawad Abdelmoula (MAR)
Cagliari	Alex Yee (GBR)	Jonny Brownlee (GBR)	Manoel Messias (BRA)
Bermuda	Vincent Luis (FRA)	Antonio Serrat (ESP)	Roberto Sanchez (ESP)
Abu Dhabi^{Grand Final}	Léo Bergère (FRA)	Morgan Pearson (USA)	Jelle Geens (BEL)
Overall^{World Championship}	Léo Bergère (FRA)	Alex Yee (GBR)	Hayden Wilde (NZL)

* The Montreal event, held in super-sprint eliminator format, doubled as the stand-alone World Triathlon Sprint Championships.

==== Women ====
Event	Gold	Silver	Bronze
Yokohama	Georgia Taylor-Brown (GBR)	Léonie Périault (FRA)	Flora Duffy (BER)
Leeds	Cassandre Beaugrand (FRA)	Georgia Taylor-Brown (GBR)	Sophie Coldwell (GBR)
Montreal *	Georgia Taylor-Brown (GBR)	Cassandre Beaugrand (FRA)	Beth Potter (GBR)
Hamburg	Flora Duffy (BER)	Beth Potter (GBR)	Lisa Tertsch (GER)
Cagliari	Georgia Taylor-Brown (GBR)	Emma Lombardi (FRA)	Taylor Knibb (USA)
Bermuda	Flora Duffy (BER)	Taylor Knibb (USA)	Beth Potter (GBR)
Abu Dhabi^{Grand Final}	Flora Duffy (BER)	Georgia Taylor-Brown (GBR)	Lena Meissner (GER)
Overall^{World Championship}	Flora Duffy (BER)	Georgia Taylor-Brown (GBR)	Taylor Knibb (USA)

^{* The Montreal event, held in super-sprint eliminator format, doubled as the stand-alone World Triathlon Sprint Championships.}

==== World Sprint Championship ====
The event was held as a leg of the World Triathlon Championship Series in Montreal, in conjunction with the World Mixed Relay Championships

Event	Gold	Silver	Bronze
Sprint Men	Alex Yee (GBR)	Hayden Wilde (NZL)	Léo Bergère (FRA)
Sprint Women	Georgia Taylor-Brown (GBR)	Cassandre Beaugrand (FRA)	Beth Potter (GBR)

==== Mixed relay ====
Event	Gold	Silver	Bronze
Leeds	Germany (GER); Lasse Nygaard Priester; Anabel Knoll; Lasse Lührs; Laura Lindemann	Great Britain (GBR); Tom Bishop; Sophie Coldwell; Grant Sheldon; Georgia Taylor-Brown	France (FRA); Tom Richard; Sandra Dodet; Léo Bergère; Audrey Merle
Montreal^{World Championship}	France (FRA); Pierre le Corre; Emma Lombardi; Vincent Luis; Cassandre Beaugrand	Great Britain (GBR); Alex Yee; Sophie Coldwell; Sam Dickinson; Georgia Taylor-Brown	United States (USA); Seth Rider; Taylor Spivey; Kevin McDowell; Summer Rappaport
Hamburg	Great Britain (GBR); Barclay Izzard; Sian Rainsley; Sam Dickinson; Kate Waugh	Australia (AUS); Luke Willian; Sophie Linn; Matthew Hauser; Natalie Van Coevorden	Germany (GER); Valentin Wernz; Lisa Tertsch; Lasse Nygaard Priester; Laura Lindemann

== Overall standings ==
In the individual events, the athlete who accumulates the most points throughout the season is declared the year's world champion.

=== Men ===
Rank	Athlete	Points
1st place, gold medalist(s)	Léo Bergère (FRA)	4741.89
2nd place, silver medalist(s)	Alex Yee (GBR)	4721.41
3rd place, bronze medalist(s)	Hayden Wilde (NZL)	4696.48
4	Jelle Geens (BEL)	4384.52
5	Vincent Luis (FRA)	3880.95
6	Matthew Hauser (AUS)	3232.56
7	Antonio Serrat Seoane (ESP)	3000.65
8	Vasco Vilaça (POR)	2895.57
9	Lasse Lührs (GER)	2792.69
10	Pierre Le Corre (FRA)	2727.14

=== Women ===
Rank	Athlete	Points
Gold medal	Flora Duffy (BER)	5105.63
Silver medal	Georgia Taylor-Brown (GBR)	5081.25
3rd place, bronze medalist(s)	Taylor Knibb (USA)	4179.23
4	Taylor Spivey (USA)	3889.44
5	Cassandre Beaugrand (FRA)	3801.32
6	Sophie Coldwell (GBR)	3537.29
7	Beth Potter (GBR)	3479.86
8	Laura Lindemann (GER)	3296.14
9	Maya Kingma (NED)	3101.88
10	Miriam Casillas Garcia (ESP)	3019.96

== List of 2022 World Championship podiums ==
The following is a list of all the World Championship medalists crowned on the various legs of the World Triathlon Championship series. While the men and women's elite championships were decided over the full series, the Sprint, Mixed Relay, Under-23, Junior and Para-triathlon World Championships were all decided by single races, either on the Montreal leg (junior, sprint and both elite and u-23/Jr mixed relay) or Abu Dhabi grand final (Under-23 and paratriathlon).

Event	Gold	Silver	Bronze
Senior
Men's overall^{season-long}	Léo Bergère (FRA)	Alex Yee (GBR)	Hayden Wilde (NZL)
Women's overall^{season-long}	Flora Duffy (BER)	Georgia Taylor-Brown (GBR)	Taylor Knibb (USA)
Mixed relay^{Montreal}	France (FRA); Pierre le Corre; Emma Lombardi; Vincent Luis; Cassandre Beaugrand	Great Britain (GBR); Alex Yee; Sophie Coldwell; Sam Dickinson; Georgia Taylor-Brown	United States (USA); Seth Rider; Taylor Spivey; Kevin McDowell; Summer Rappaport
Men's sprint^{Montreal}	Alex Yee (GBR)	Hayden Wilde (NZL)	Léo Bergère (FRA)
Women's sprint^{Montreal}	Georgia Taylor-Brown (GBR)	Cassandre Beaugrand (FRA)	Beth Potter (GBR)
Age-grade
Men's U-23^{Abu Dhabi}	Connor Bentley (GBR)	Gergely Kiss (HUN)	Hamish Reilly (GBR)
Women's U-23^{Abu Dhabi}	Kate Waugh (GBR)	Annika Koch (GER)	Bianca Seregni (ITA)
Men's junior^{Montreal}	Thomas Hansmaennel (FRA)	Toby Powers (AUS)	Reese Vannerson (USA)
Women's junior^{Montreal}	Tilda Månsson (SWE)	Jule Behrens (GER)	Livia Gross (SUI)
Mixed relay U-23/Jr^{Montreal}	France (FRA)	Great Britain (GBR)	Germany (GER)

== World Triathlon Para Championships ==
2022 World Triathlon Para Championships
- League: World Triathlon Para Championships
- Sport: Paratriathlon

Men's Series
- World Champions: PTWC : Jetze Plat; PTS2 : Jules Ribstein; PTS3 : Daniel Molina; PTS4 : Alexis Hanquinquant; PTS5 : Stefan Daniel; PTVI : Dave Ellis

Women's Series
- World Champions: PTWC : Lauren Parker; PTS2 : Hailey Danz; PTS3 : Elise Marc; PTS4 : Andrea Miguelez; PTS5 : Grace Norman; PTVI : Susana Rodriguez

World Triathlon Para Championship seasons
- ← 2021 2023 →

The 2022 World Triathlon Para Championships, a series of single-race Championships for paratriathletes, was held as part of the Grand Final event in Abu Dhabi.

Event	Gold	Silver	Bronze
Para triathlon
Men's PTWC^{Abu Dhabi}	Jetze Plat; Netherlands	Florian Brungraber; Australia	Geert Schipper; Netherlands
Men's PTS2^{Abu Dhabi}	Jules Ribstein; France	Lionel Morales; Spain	Wim De Paepe; Belgium
Men's PTS3^{Abu Dhabi}	Daniel Molina; Spain	Nico van der Bergte; Netherlands	Max Gelhaar; Germany
Men's PTS4^{Abu Dhabi}	Alexis Hanquinquant; France	Pierre-Antoine Baele; France	Jeremy Peacock; Australia
Men's PTS5^{Abu Dhabi}	Stefan Daniel; Canada	Martin Schultz; Germany	Chris Hammer; United States
Men's PTVI^{Abu Dhabi}	Dave Ellis; Great Britain	Thibaut Regaudeau; France	Antoine Perel; France
Women's PTWC^{Abu Dhabi}	Lauren Parker; Australia	Kendall Gretsch; United States	Jéssica Messali; Brazil
Women's PTS2^{Abu Dhabi}	Hailey Danz; United States	Melissa Stockwell; United States	Anu Francis; Australia
Women's PTS3^{Abu Dhabi}	Elise Marc; France	No medals awarded*	
Women's PTS4^{Abu Dhabi}	Andrea Miguelez Ranz; Spain	Kelly Elmlinger; United States	Marta Frances Gomez; Spain
Women's PTS5^{Abu Dhabi}	Grace Norman; United States	Claire Cashmore; Great Britain	Kamylie Frenette; Canada
Women's PTVI^{Abu Dhabi}	Susana Rodriguez; Spain	Francesca Tarentello; Italy	Alison Peasgood; Great Britain

* Due to the classification consisting of only 2 competitors, only the gold medal was awarded.
