= Triathlon at the 2024 Summer Olympics – Mixed relay =

Mixed relay at the Games of the XXXIII Olympiad
- Venue: Pont Alexandre III, Paris
- Date: 5 August 2024
- Competitors: 60 from 15 nations
- Winning time: 1:25:39

Medalists
1st place, gold medalist(s)		Tim Hellwig; Lisa Tertsch; Lasse Lührs; Laura Lindemann	Germany
2nd place, silver medalist(s)		Seth Rider; Taylor Spivey; Morgan Pearson; Taylor Knibb	United States
3rd place, bronze medalist(s)		Alex Yee; Georgia Taylor-Brown; Sam Dickinson; Beth Potter	Great Britain

The Mixed relay triathlon at the 2024 Summer Olympics took place at the Pont Alexandre III in Paris on 5 August 2024. The mixed team event featured teams of four (two men and two women). Each athlete swam 300 m (330 yd), cycled 8 km (5.0 mi), and ran 2 km (1.2 mi) in a relay format.

Five Tokyo 2020 medallists - Morgan Pearson and Taylor Knibb of the United States, Alex Yee and Georgia Taylor-Brown of Great Britain, and Cassandre Beaugrand of France - took part in the event. The other members of each of those teams were changed from the previous Olympics. In the United States' team, Pearson and Knibb were retained while Kevin McDowell and Katie Zaferes were replaced with Seth Rider and Taylor Spivey. In Great Britain's team, Yee and Taylor-Brown were retained while Jonny Brownlee, now retired, and Jess Learmonth were replaced with Sam Dickinson and Beth Potter. For the host country's team, Vincent Luis, Dorian Coninx and Léonie Périault were replaced with Pierre Le Corre, Léo Bergère and Emma Lombardi.

Laura Lindemann anchored Germany to the gold, finishing just ahead of the United States' Knibb and Great Britain's Potter. All three athletes finished within one second of each other. Great Britain were originally announced as having secured the silver, but after a review of the photo finish, it was confirmed just before the medal ceremony that Knibb had edged out Potter for second place. Despite this late disappointment, the bronze medal made Great Britain's Alex Yee the first triathlete to win four Olympic medals in the sport.

The race was originally supposed to be contested by 16 teams, but Belgium was forced to drop out after one team member, Claire Michel, fell ill. The Swiss team also had to shuffle its lineup as a result of illness. Simon Westermann was originally supposed to replace Adrien Briffod after he came down with a stomach infection. However, after falling ill from a stomach bug himself, Westermann was replaced by Sylvain Fridelance.

== Results ==
Rank	Nation	Triathletes	Swimming	Cycling	Running	Total time	Difference
1st place, gold medalist(s)	Germany	Tim Hellwig; Lisa Tertsch; Lasse Lührs; Laura Lindemann				1:25:39	__
2nd place, silver medalist(s)	United States	Seth Rider; Taylor Spivey; Morgan Pearson; Taylor Knibb				1:25:40	+0:01
3rd place, bronze medalist(s)	Great Britain	Alex Yee; Georgia Taylor-Brown; Sam Dickinson; Beth Potter				1:25:40	+0:01
4	France	Pierre Le Corre; Emma Lombardi; Léo Bergère; Cassandre Beaugrand				1:26:47	+1:08
5	Portugal	Ricardo Batista; Melanie Santos; Vasco Vilaça; Maria Tomé				1:27:08	+1:29
6	Italy	Gianluca Pozzatti; Alice Betto; Alessio Crociani; Verena Steinhauser				1:27:11	+1:32
7	Switzerland	Max Studer; Julie Derron; Sylvain Fridelance; Cathia Schär				1:27:16	+1:37
8	Brazil	Miguel Hidalgo; Djenyfer Arnold; Manoel Messias; Vittória Lopes				1:27:23	+1:44
9	Spain	Alberto González Garcia; Anna Godoy Conteras; Antonio Serrat Seoane; Miriam Casillas				1:27:30	+1:51
10	Netherlands	Mitch Kolkman; Maya Kingma; Richard Murray; Rachel Klamer				1:27:37	+1:58
11	Norway	Vetle Bergsvik Thorn; Lotte Miller; Kristian Blummenfelt; Solveig Løvseth				1:27:40	+2:01
12	Australia	Luke Willian; Natalie Van Coevorden; Matthew Hauser; Sophie Linn				1:28:50	+3:11
13	Mexico	Aram Peñaflor; Rosa Tapia; Crisanto Grajales; Lizeth Rueda				1:29:20	+3:41
14	New Zealand	Hayden Wilde; Nicole van der Kaay; Dylan McCullough; Ainsley Thorpe				1:30:23	+4:44
15	Austria	Alois Knabl; Julia Hauser; Tjebbe Kaindl; Lisa Perterer					LAP
	Belgium	Jelle Geens; Marten Van Riel; Claire Michel; Jolien Vermeylen					DNS
