= Triathlon at the 2024 Summer Olympics =

Triathlon at the Games of the XXXIII Olympiad
- Triathlon logo for the 2024 Summer Olympics
- Venue: Pont Alexandre III
- Dates: 31 July – 5 August
- No. of events: 3 (1 men, 1 women, 1 mixed)
- Competitors: 110 from 42 nations

The triathlon competitions at the 2024 Summer Olympics in Paris ran from 31 July to 5 August at Pont Alexandre III, featuring a total of 110 athletes who were to compete in each of the men's and women's events. After a successful debut at the 2020 Summer Olympics, the mixed relay competition will remain in the triathlon program for the second time.

== Format ==
The Olympic triathlon comprises three components: swimming 1.5 km (0.93 mi), cycling 40 km (25 mi), and running 10 km (6.2 mi). The competitions take the form of a single event between all competitors with no heats.

The mixed team event features teams of four (two men and two women). Each athlete swims 300 m (330 yd), cycles 8 km (5.0 mi), and runs 2 km (1.2 mi) in a relay format.

== Qualification ==
The qualification period commenced on 27 May 2022 and concluded on the same day in 2024. 110 athletes (55 for each gender) vied for the coveted spots with a maximum of three per gender for each NOC. As the host country, France automatically receives four quota places (two per gender) while the highest-ranked eligible NOC will each obtain two men's and two women's spots at the 2022 and 2023 Mixed Relay World Championships.

Six highest-ranked eligible NOCs will be awarded two quota places per gender based on the World Triathlon Mixed Relay Olympic Qualification Rankings of 25 March 2024, with two more from the Mixed Relay Olympic Qualification Event held between 15 April and 27 May 2024. The qualification period concludes with the top 26 individuals per gender securing a coveted place, subject to the limit of three per NOC and ignoring the first two from each NOC that qualified through the mixed relays. One additional spot for each continent will be allocated to the highest-ranked male and female triathlete from the NOC not yet qualified for the Games. The final two spots per gender are awarded to the triathletes under the Tripartite Commission and to those eligible in the top 180 of the World Triathlon individual rankings.

== Schedule ==
All dates use Central European Summer Time (UTC+2). All event times are subject to change.

Event	Date	Time
Women's Individual	31 July	8:00
Men's Individual	31 July	10:45
Mixed Relay	5 August	8:00

The men's individual event was originally scheduled for 30 July 2024 but was postponed when the water quality in the Seine failed a safety test for levels of pollution.

== Participating nations ==
A total of 110 triathletes from 42 nations qualified.

- Argentina (1)
- Australia (4)
- Austria (4)
- Azerbaijan (1)
- Barbados (1)
- Belgium (4)
- Bermuda (3)
- Brazil (4)
- Canada (3)
- Chile (2)
- China (1)
- Colombia (1)
- Czech Republic (1)
- Denmark (2)
- Ecuador (1)
- France (6) Host
- Germany (6)
- Great Britain (5)
- Guam (1)
- Hong Kong (1)
- Hungary (3)
- Iceland (1)
- Israel (1)
- Italy (5)
- Japan (3)
- Kazakhstan (1)
- Luxembourg (1)
- Mauritius (1)
- Mexico (4)
- Morocco (1)
- Netherlands (4)
- New Zealand (4)
- Norway (4)
- Poland (1)
- Portugal (4)
- Romania (1)
- Spain (5)
- South Africa (3)
- Sweden (1)
- Switzerland (4)
- Togo (1)
- United States (5)

== Medal summary ==
A total of nine medals were won by six NOC's.

=== Medal table ===
* Host nation (France)

Rank	NOC	Gold	Silver	Bronze	Total
1	Great Britain	1	0	2	3
2	France*	1	0	1	2
3	Germany	1	0	0	1
4	New Zealand	0	1	0	1
4	Switzerland	0	1	0	1
4	United States	0	1	0	1
Totals (6 entries)		3	3	3	9

=== Medalists ===
Games	Gold		Silver		Bronze	
Men's individual	Alex Yee; Great Britain	1:43:33	Hayden Wilde; New Zealand	1:43:39	Léo Bergère; France	1:43:43
Women's individual	Cassandre Beaugrand; France	1:54:55	Julie Derron; Switzerland	1:55:01	Beth Potter; Great Britain	1:55:10
Mixed relay	Germany; Tim Hellwig; Lisa Tertsch; Lasse Lührs; Laura Lindemann	1:25:39	United States; Seth Rider; Taylor Spivey; Morgan Pearson; Taylor Knibb	1:25:40	Great Britain; Alex Yee; Georgia Taylor-Brown; Sam Dickinson; Beth Potter	1:25:40

== See also ==
- Triathlon at the 2023 Pan American Games
- Paratriathlon at the 2024 Summer Paralympics
