= Pierre-Antoine Baele =

French paratriathlete (born 1992)

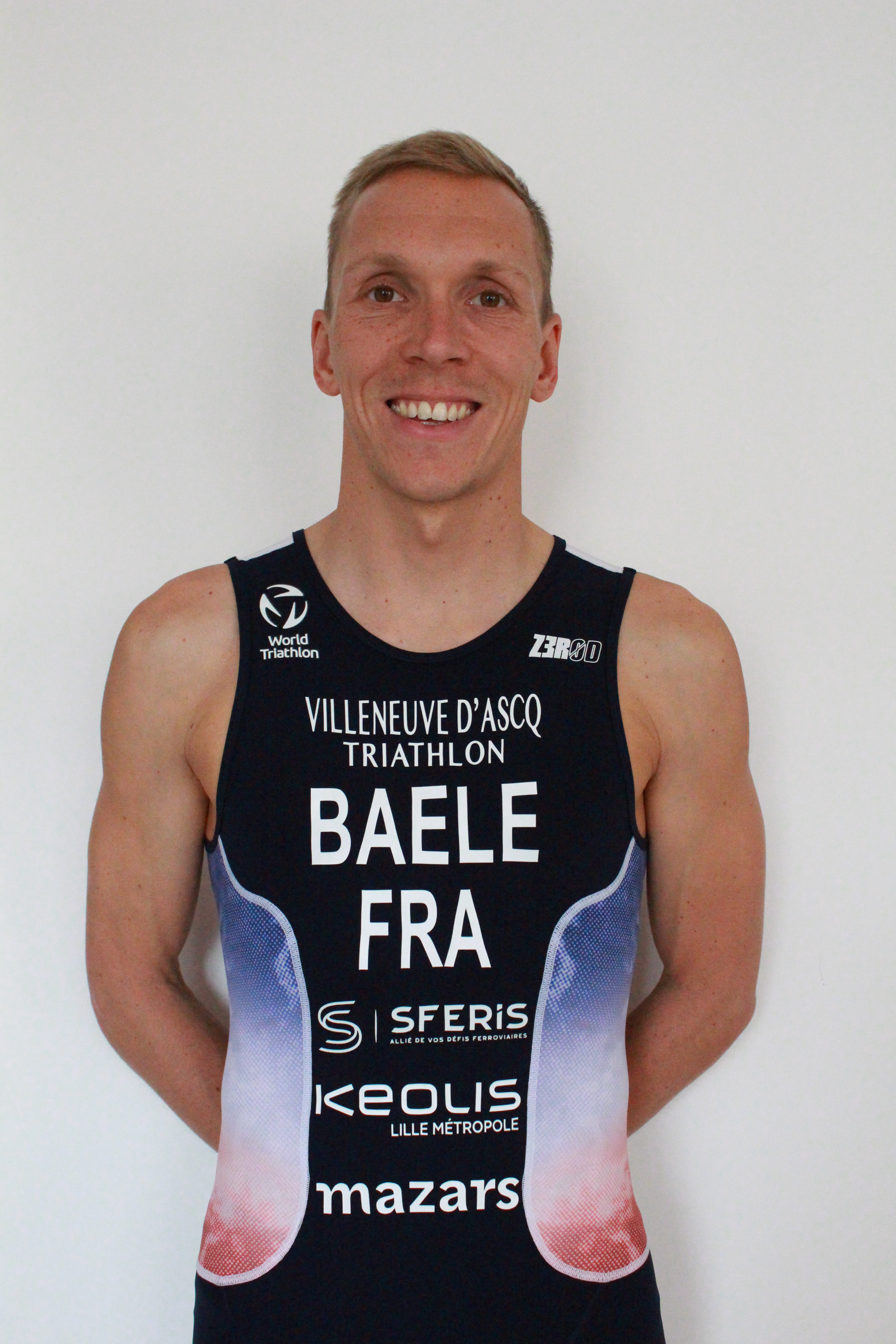

Personal information
- Born: 2 January 1992 (age 34) Lille, France

Sport
- Country: France
- Sport: Paratriathlon
- Disability class: PTS4
Medal record
Men's paratriathlon
Representing France
World Championships
Silver medal – second place	2022 Abu Dhabi	PTS4
Silver medal – second place	2023 Ponteverde	PTS4
Silver medal – second place	2023 Ponteverde	Mixed relay
Silver medal – second place	2025 Wollongong	PTS4
Bronze medal – third place	2024 Torremolinos	PTS4
Bronze medal – third place	2026 Pontevedra	PTS4
European Championships
Silver medal – second place	2022 Olsztyn	PTS4
Silver medal – second place	2024 Vichy	PTS4
Silver medal – second place	2025 Besançon	PTS4
Bronze medal – third place	2023 Madrid	PTS4

Pierre-Antoine Baele (born 2 January 1992) is a French paratriathlete. He represented France at the 2024 Summer Paralympics.

== Career ==
Baele started his career in judo before discovering para-athletics in 2012. In December 2016, he met Alexis Hanquinquant who inspired him to pursue a career in paratriathlon.

Baele made his international debut for France at the 2022 World Championship and won a silver medal in the PTS4 event. He also won a silver medal at the 2022 Europe Triathlon Championships. He again competed at the 2023 World Championship and won a silver medal.

In July 2024, he was selected to represent France at the 2024 Summer Paralympics. He competed in the PTS4 event and finished in fourth place, finishing 15 seconds behind bronze medalist Nil Riudavets. Weeks later he then competed at the 2024 European Triathlon Championships and won a bronze medal in the PTS4 event.

== Personal life ==
Baele was born with agenesis in his left foot. He is in a relationship with Candice Guillaume.
