= Triathlon at the 2020 Summer Paralympics – Women's PTWC =

Women's PTWC at the XVI Paralympic Games
- Venue: Odaiba Marine Park
- Dates: 29 August 2021
- Competitors: 10 from 9 nations

Medalists
1st place, gold medalist(s)		Kendall Gretsch	United States
2nd place, silver medalist(s)		Lauren Parker	Australia
3rd place, bronze medalist(s)		Eva Moral	Spain

The Triathlon at the 2020 Summer Paralympics – Women's PTWC event at the 2020 Paralympic Games took place at 06:31 on 29 August 2021 at the Odaiba Marine Park.

== Results ==
Key : T = Transition; L = Lap

Rank	Bib	Name	Nationality	Swim	T1	Bike				T2	Run				Time
Rank	Bib	Name	Nationality	Swim	T1	L1	L2	L3	L4	T2	L1	L2	L3	L4	Time
1st place, gold medalist(s)	106	Kendall Gretsch	United States	11:12	1:33	8:45	8:58	9:03	9:12	0:43	3:00	3:16	3:15	3:24	1:06:25
2nd place, silver medalist(s)	104	Lauren Parker	Australia	11:47	2:11	9:12	9:21	9:08	9:22	1:09	3:17	3:35	3:33	3:51	1:06:26
3rd place, bronze medalist(s)	101	Eva Moral	Spain	13:51	2:03	9:56	10:41	10:26	10:24	1:05	3:49	4:07	4:04	4:33	1:14:59
4	108	Jéssica Messali	Brazil	16:31	2:12	9:51	10:00	10:15	10:20	1:13	3:56	3:50	3:57	4:18	1:16:23
5	107	Brenda Osnaya	Mexico	14:34	1:46	10:37	10:34	10:43	10:51	1:15	3:51	4:07	3:57	4:17	1:16:32
6	102	Mona Francis	France	11:23	1:48	10:04	9:48	9:53	9:54	1:01	4:38	5:13	4:28	4:35	1:16:49
7	103	Margret IJdema	Netherlands	13:29	2:04	10:14	10:34	10:43	10:53	1:11	4:12	4:25	4:28	4:42	1:16:55
8	109	Rita Cuccuru	Italy	15:34	2:00	10:00	10:11	10:08	10:34	1:34	4:29	4:35	4:46	5:15	1:19:06
9	110	Wakako Tsuchida	Japan	15:48	1:45	10:23	10:24	10:32	10:44	1:14	3:09	3:31	3:49	7:09	1:22:32
DNF	105	Emily Tapp	Australia	14:48	1:50	9:45									
