= Jean Vanier Catholic High School =

Jean Vanier Catholic High School may refer to:

- Jean Vanier Catholic High School (Richmond Hill), in York Region, Ontario, Canada
- Jean Vanier Catholic High School (Collingwood), in Collingwood, Ontario, Canada

== See also ==
- Jean Vanier Catholic Secondary School, Toronto, Canada
