= Beth Potter =

Scottish long-distance runner and triathlete

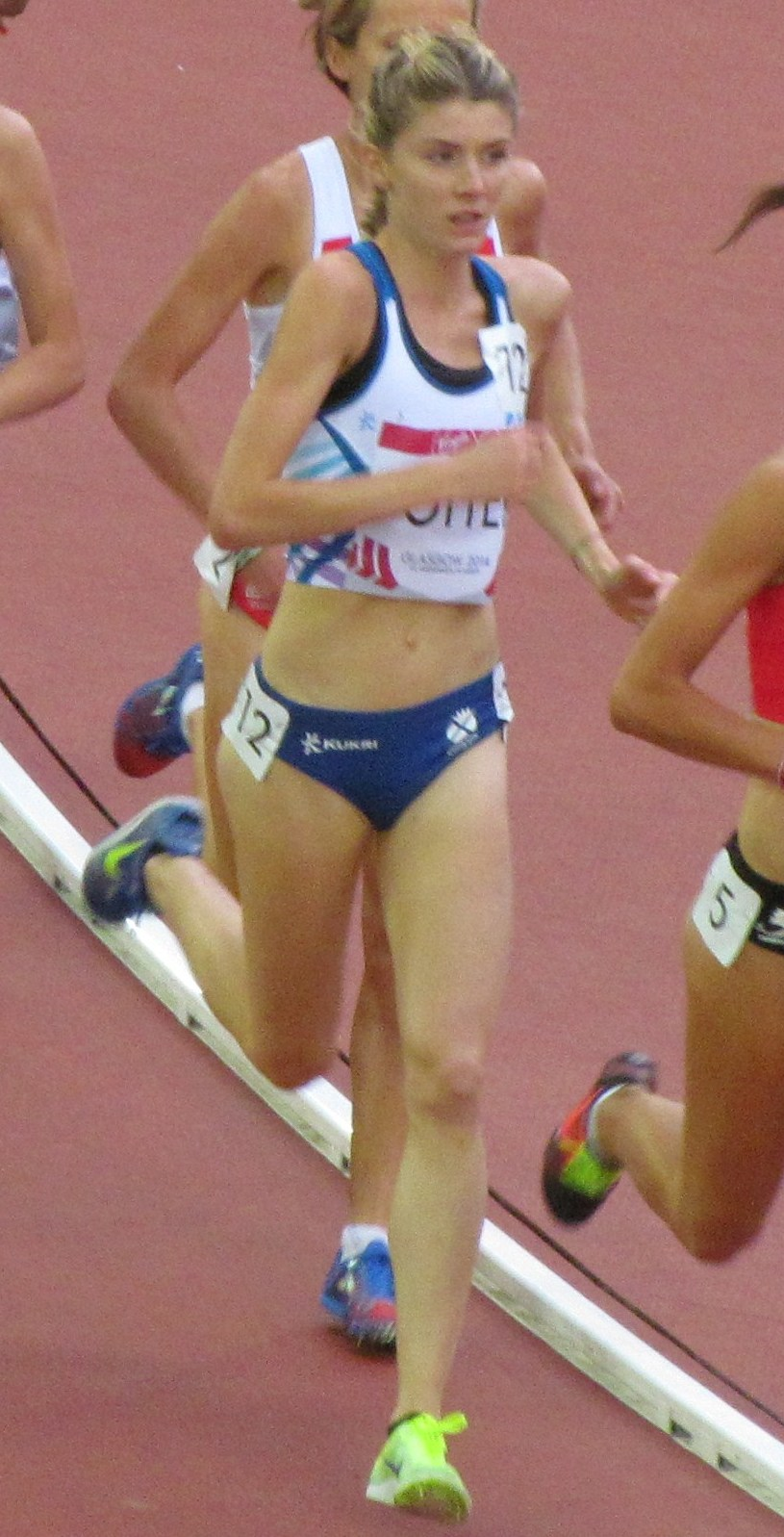
- Potter in 2014

Personal information
- Full name: Elizabeth Potter
- Born: 27 December 1991 (age 34) Glasgow, Scotland
- Height: 1.70 m (5 ft 7 in)
- Weight: 51 kg (112 lb)

Sport
- Sport: Athletics, Triathlon
- Club: Shaftesbury Barnet Harriers
- Coached by: Mick Woods
Medal record
Women's triathlon
Representing Great Britain
Olympic Games
Bronze medal – third place	2024 Paris	Individual
Bronze medal – third place	2024 Paris	Mixed relay
World Triathlon Championships
Gold medal – first place	2023	Elite
Silver medal – second place	2024	Elite
Silver medal – second place	2026	Elite
Bronze medal – third place	2025	Elite
European Triathlon Championships
Gold medal – first place	2019 Weert	Individual
Representing Scotland
Commonwealth Games
Bronze medal – third place	2022 Birmingham	Individual

Elizabeth Potter (born 27 December 1991) is a Scottish triathlete and long distance runner. She competed for Great Britain in athletics at the 2016 Summer Olympics in Rio de Janeiro. In 2019 she won the gold medal at the European Triathlon Championships in Weert, Netherlands. In 2022, she won individual bronze at the 2022 World Triathlon Sprint Championships, and silver with Team Great Britain in the World Triathlon Mixed Relay Championships. In 2023, she won the Elite championship in the World Triathlon Championship Series, becoming the sixth British women's world champion.

Potter also competes in Super League Triathlon. She won the Super League Triathlon Arena Games, London 2021, and was second at the Rotterdam event. In 2022 Potter became the first Esports Triathlon World Champion, by winning the 2022 Arena Games Triathlon series. Potter won a bronze medal at the 2024 Summer Olympics in Paris in the individual triathlon.

== Early life ==
Potter was born in Scotland and grew up in Bearsden, where she ran for Victoria Park Glasgow. Her father, Alex, is also a competitive runner and her sister, Sarah, is a running coach. At a young age Potter was a competitive swimmer. She attended Loughborough University. Potter moved to London for postgraduate training at St Mary's University, Twickenham and trained as part of the Endurance Performance Centre there through Rio 2016.

== Career ==
=== Running career ===
Potter began competing as a runner in 2004. In 2008, she placed first at the Scottish Under-15 Championships in cross country and in the 1500m distance in track. She finished 36th in Under 20 cross-country at the World Championships in 2010.

Coming back from an injury, Potter placed 18th in 5,000m at the under 23 European Championships in 2013 (16th after disqualifications). Potter began training with coach Mick Woods who convinced her not to quit running. Potter was more successful in 2014 competing at the senior level, representing Scotland at Glasgow where she finished 9th in the 5,000m and 5th at the 10,000m distance. The next year she had a disappointing 2015 season due to illness.

Potter qualified to represent Great Britain at the 2016 Summer Olympics in Rio de Janeiro. She secured her place qualifying as the second British woman in the women's 10,000m behind Jess Andrews. Leading up to the Olympics, Potter trained with fellow Scot Steph Twell. Potter also worked with a sports psychologist weekly in an effort to overcome her difficulty managing stress. She competed at the 2016 Summer Olympics in Rio de Janeiro, in the women's 10,000 metres, finishing 34th.

In May 2017 Potter won the 10,000 metres at the British trials, her first race on the track since the Olympics, qualifying her for the 2017 World Athletics Championships in London.

=== Triathlon career ===
In January 2017 Potter announced that she was planning to make a transition from athletics to triathlon with a view to competing in triathlon at the 2020 Summer Olympics, having moved to Leeds to join an elite training group including Alistair Brownlee, Jonathan Brownlee, Vicky Holland and Non Stanford, although she did also indicate that she would aim to compete in the 2017 World Athletics Championships. In June 2017 she finished third in the elite race at the Blenheim Palace Triathlon and won the elite competition at the Cardiff Triathlon.

Potter finished 4th in the 2021 Super League Triathlon Championship Series, as well as winning the Super League Triathlon Arena Games, London, and finishing second at the Rotterdam event. in 2022, Potter won Arena Games Triathlon Powered by Zwift, Munich, the first event of the new Arena Games Triathlon Powered by Zwift Esports World Championship series. Two weeks later, at Arena Games Triathlon London, she finished in 2nd place behind France's Cassandre Beaugrand At the final event of the series, held at Marina Bay Singapore, Potter finished in second place, behind Hungary's Zsanett Bragmeyer. Her second place finish, was however enough to take the overall title in the 2022 Arena Games Triathlon Series, making Potter the inaugural Esports Triathlon World Champion.

She finished in third place at SLT NEOM, the final event of the 2022 Super League Triathlon season, her podium finish at the event secured her 4th place in the series overall.

In August 2023, Potter won the Olympic Games Test Event for the 2024 Summer Olympics in Paris, finishing ahead of Cassandre Beaugrand and Laura Lindemann. On 24 September, she was crowned World Champion after winning the World Triathlon Championship Series final in Pontevedra, Spain.

In November 2023 it was announced that Potter had been selected for the British 2024 Summer Olympic team. At the Paris 2024 Olympics, Potter came third and took the Bronze Medal.

=== Teaching career ===
In addition to training as a runner, as of June 2016 Potter was teaching physics in west London. However by the end of that year she had left her teaching post in order to concentrate on training full-time.
