= Leanne Taylor =

Canadian paratriathlete

Personal information
- Born: July 27, 1992 (age 33)
- Website: www.leanne-taylor.com

Sport
- Sport: Paratriathlon
- Disability: PTWC
Medal record
Women's paratriathlon
Representing Canada
Summer Paralympics
Bronze medal – third place	2024 Paris	PTWC
Americas Championships
Gold medal – first place	2024 Miami	PTWC
Silver medal – second place	2022 Sarasota-Bradenton	PTWC
Silver medal – second place	2023 Sarasota	PTWC

Leanne Taylor (born July 27, 1992) is a Canadian paratriathlete.

== Early life ==
Taylor was born in England and is from Oak Bluff, Manitoba. She moved to Wasaga Beach, Ontario when she was 10-years old and graduated from Jean Vanier Catholic High School in Collingwood, Ontario now called Our Lady of the Bay Catholic High School.

== Career ==
In 2019, Taylor competed in her first paratriathlon, the Paratriathlon American Championships in Florida. She failed to qualify for the Tokyo Olympics in 2021.

In 2024, Taylor won the Americas Paratriathlon Championships Miami in the Women's PTWC classification. Taylor won her first career gold medal on the World Triathlon Para Series circuit at the Swansea event in 2024 with a time of 1:12:21. She placed second at the next World Triathlon Para Series event that year in Montreal.

Taylor competed in paratriathlon at the 2024 Summer Paralympics and won a bronze medal in the PTWC event. She was the first Canadian woman to win a Paralympic medal in paratriathlon. Following the 2024 Paralympics, Taylor began training for the 2028 Paralympics with coach Lisa Mensink. She placed third in the women’s division of the Philadelphia Marathon in November 2024. She sat out the 2025 paratriathlon circuit due to pregnancy and will return to the sport for the 2026 World Para Triathlon Series opener in Yokohama, Japan.

== Personal life ==
Taylor was paralyzed from the waist down in a mountain biking accident in Bison Butte Trail in southwest Winnipeg in 2018, when she broke her back at the 11th thoracic vertebrae. She lives in Winnipeg with her husband, Scott Dyck, and is a compliance officer for a pharmaceutical company. She gave birth to her son in July 2025.
