= Jéssica Messali =

Brazilian paratriathlete (born 1987)

Personal information
- Full name: Jéssica Ferreira Messali
- Born: 29 October 1987 (age 38) Jaboticabal, São Paulo, Brazil

Sport
- Sport: Paratriathlon
- Disability class: PTWC
Medal record
Representing Brazil
Women's paratriathlon
World Championships
Silver medal – second place	2024 Torremolinos	PTWC
Bronze medal – third place	2022 Abu Dhabi	PTWC
Bronze medal – third place	2023 Ponteverde	PTWC
Bronze medal – third place	2023 Ponteverde	Mixed relay
Bronze medal – third place	2025 Wollongong	PTWC
Bronze medal – third place	2025 Wollongong	Mixed relay

Jéssica Ferreira Messali (born 29 October 1987) is a Brazilian paratriathlete. She represented Brazil at the 2020 and 2024 Summer Paralympics.

== Career ==
Messali began her career in para-cycling before switching to paratriathlon in December 2017. She represented Brazil at the 2020 Summer Paralympics and finished in fourth place in the PTWC paratriathlon with a time of 1:16:23. She competed at the 2022 World Triathlon Para Championships and won a bronze medal in the PTWC event with a time of 1:11:12. She competed at the 2023 World Triathlon Para Championships and again won a bronze medal in the PTWC event with a time of 1:13:48.

In September 2024, she competed at the 2024 Summer Paralympics in the PTWC paratriathlon and did not finish. The next month she competed at the 2024 World Triathlon Para Championships and won a silver medal in the PTWC event with a time of 1:07:45. She competed at the 2025 World Triathlon Para Championships and won a bronze medal in the PTWC event with a time of 1:12:46. This was Brazil's first medal of the 2025 World Championships. She also won a bronze medal in the mixed team relay.

== Personal life ==
Messali was involved in a car accident in 2013 and became a paraplegic In July 2021, Jessica suffered second- and third-degree burns on her feet and legs in a sauna, requiring partial amputation.
