= Emma Lombardi =

French triathlete (born 2001)

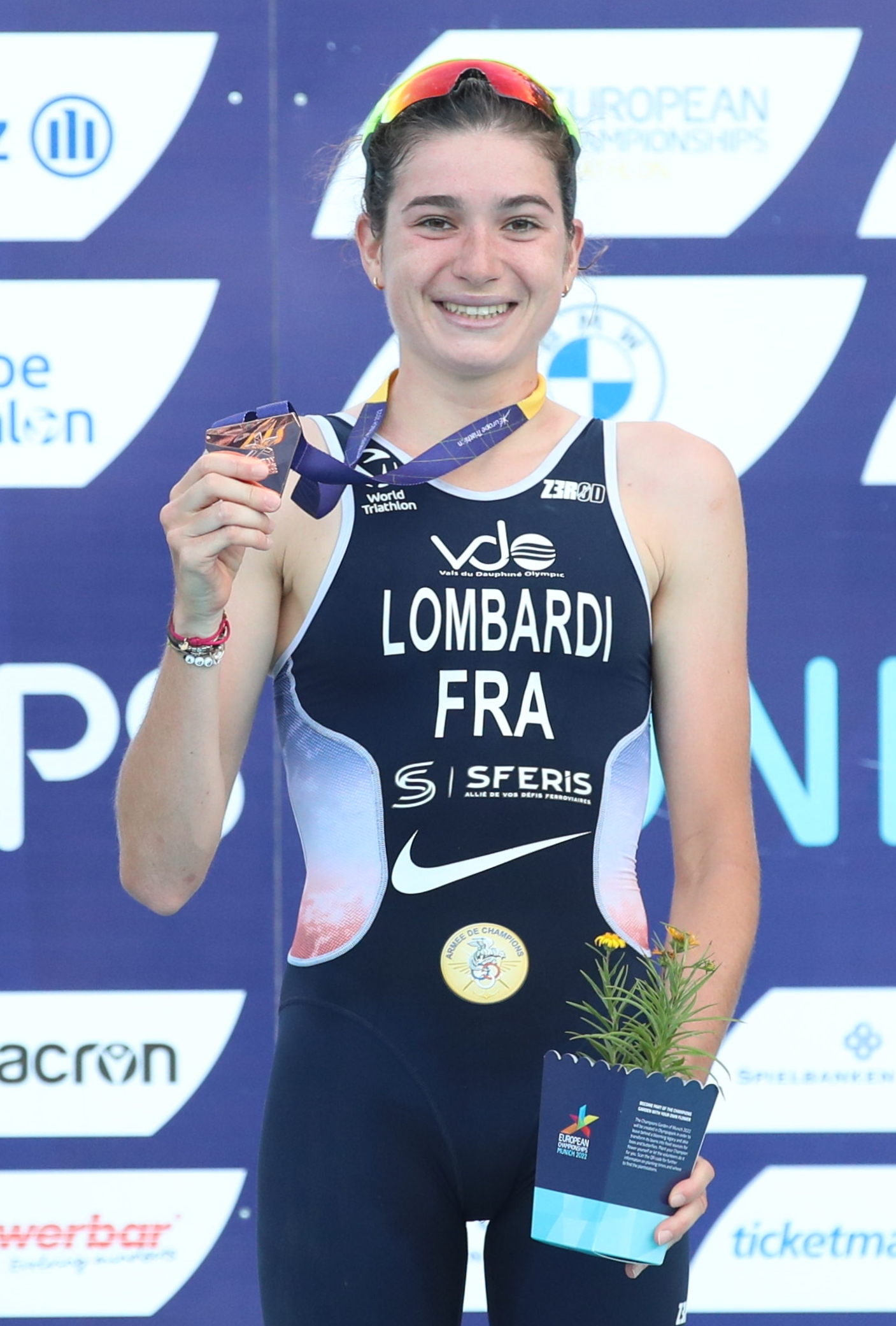
- Emma at 2022

Personal information
- Born: 12 September 2001 (age 25) Chambéry, France

Sport
- Country: France
- Sport: Triathlon
Medal record
Women's triathlon
Representing France
World Championships
Gold medal – first place	2022	Elite
Bronze medal – third place	2024	Elite
Europe Triathlon Championships
Gold medal – first place	2022 Munich	Mixed relay
Bronze medal – third place	2022 Munich	Individual

Emma Lombardi (born 12 September 2001 in Chambéry) is a French triathlete.

== Career ==
Emma Lombardi is the French junior triathlon champion in 2019 in Grignon, Savoie. In 2022, Lombardi won the U23 Triathlon World Championships in Edmonton, Canada.

At the end of June 2022, Lombardi becomes the world champion in mixed relay triathlon in Montreal, alongside Cassandre Beaugrand, Vincent Luis, and Pierre Le Corre.

After winning the bronze medal at the 2022 European Triathlon Championships in Munich. Two days later, she becomes the European champion in mixed relay.

She competed in the women's triathlon at the 2024 Summer Olympics in Paris, France.

== Personal life ==
In 2020, Lombardi enters the sports-studies program at the Creps de Boulouris-Saint-Raphaël, Var and studies for a bachelor's degree in Economics and Management remotely in Grenoble Alpes University.

== Results ==
The table shows the most significant podium results achieved on the national and international triathlon circuit since 2022.

Individual Results
Year	Competition	Country	Position	Time
2025	WTCS Wollongong	Australia	3rd place, bronze medalist(s)	01:57:16
2024	WTCS – Overall Ranking		3rd place, bronze medalist(s)	3,508 points
2024	WTCSTorremolinos	Spain	3rd place, bronze medalist(s)	01:57:34
2024	WTCS Yokohama	Japan	3rd place, bronze medalist(s)	01:53:08
2024	European Cup – Sprint Melilla	Spain	1st place, gold medalist(s)	00:54:39
2023	WTCS – Overall Ranking		3rd place, bronze medalist(s)	3,792 points
2023	WTCS Cagliari	Italy	2nd place, silver medalist(s)	01:47:06
2023	WTCS Sunderland	United Kingdom	2nd place, silver medalist(s)	01:00:11
2023	Grand Prix de Triathlon – Bordeaux	France	1st place, gold medalist(s)	00:56:47
2022	WTCS Cagliari	Italy	2nd place, silver medalist(s)	01:47:54
2022	2022 European Triathlon Championships	Germany	3rd place, bronze medalist(s)	01:52:22
2022	European Cup – Quarteira	Portugal	2nd place, silver medalist(s)	01:59:19
2022	Grand Prix de Triathlon – Dunkerque	France	1st place, gold medalist(s)	00:57:47

Mixed Relay Results
Year	Competition	Country	Position	Time
2023	WTCS Sunderland	United Kingdom	1st place, gold medalist(s)	01:26:53
2022	European Triathlon Mixed Relay Championships	Germany	1st place, gold medalist(s)	01:25:30
2022	World Triathlon Mixed Relay Championships	Canada	1st place, gold medalist(s)	01:27:14
