= Cathia Schär =

Swiss triathlete

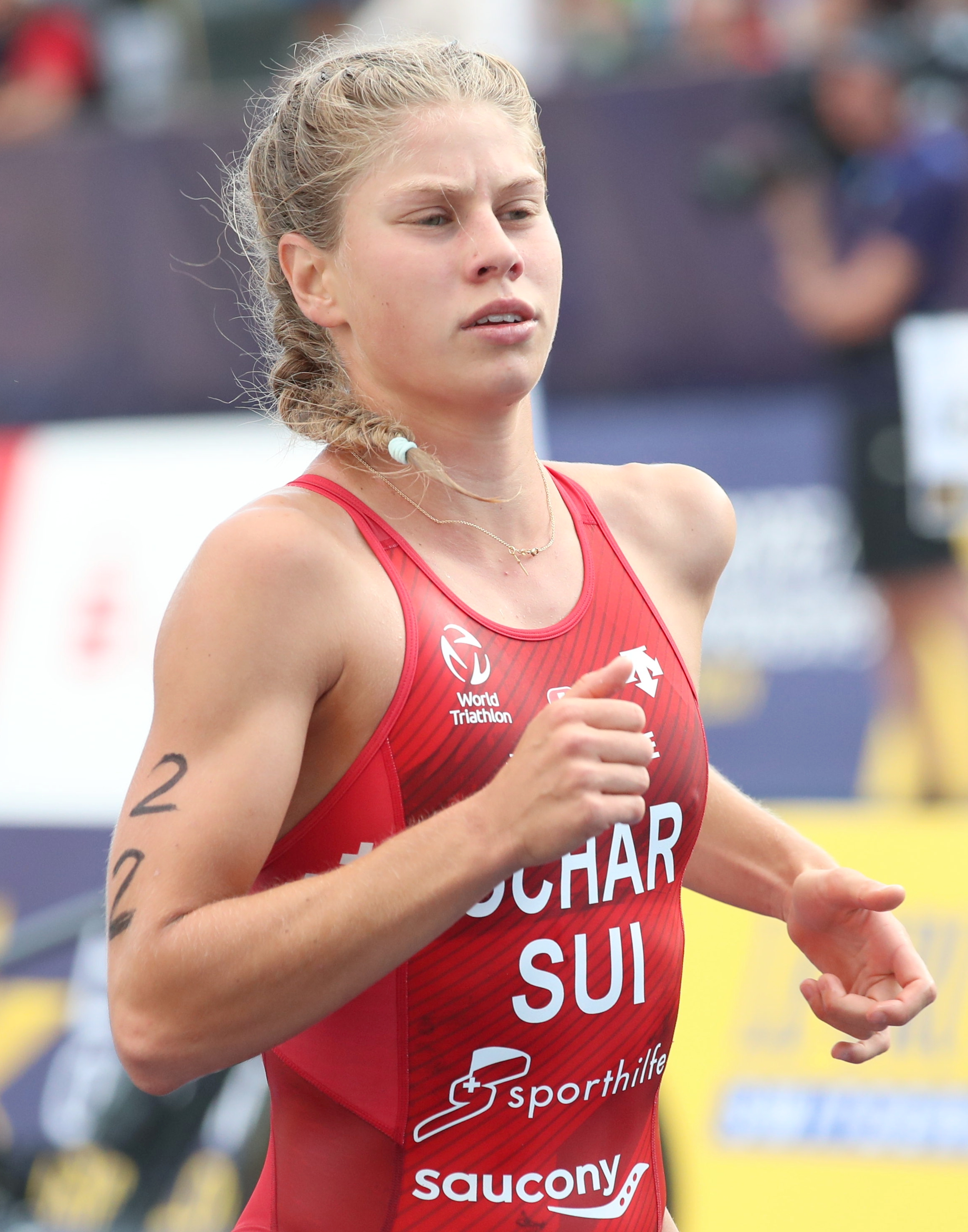
- Schär in 2022

Personal information
- Nationality: Swiss
- Born: 20 October 2001 (age 24)

Sport
- Sport: Triathlon
Medal record
Women's triathlon
Representing Switzerland
World Championships
Silver medal – second place	2024 Hamburg	Mixed relay
Bronze medal – third place	2023 Hamburg	Mixed relay
European Championships
Bronze medal – third place	2022 Munich	Mixed relay

Cathia Schär (born 20 October 2001) is a Swiss triathlete. She was a silver medalist at the 2024 World Triathlon Mixed Team Relay. She was a bronze medalist in the mixed relay at the 2022 European Triathlon Championships, and the 2023 World Triathlon Mixed Relay Championships.

== Career ==
She places fourth at the Junior European Championships in 2019. She started her first Elite European Cup race in 2021. She won the U23 European Championships in 2022.

She won a bronze medal in the mixed relay at the 2022 European Triathlon Championships in Munich, Germany.

She won the bronze medal in the Olympic distance at the 2023 European Championships in Madrid, and followed that with third place at the World Cup in Rome. In 2023, she was a bronze medalist at the World Triathlon Mixed Relay Championships in the mixed relay in Hamburg.

She placed eighth at the World Triathlon Championship Series in Hamburg in July 2024. She qualified for the 2024 Paris Olympics. She competed in the women's triathlon at the Olympics.

== Personal life ==
She is from Mézières in the canton of Vaud. She studies economics at UniDistance Switzerland.
