= Eva María Moral Pedrero =

Spanish paratriathlete

Eva Moral
Personal information
- Full name: Eva María Moral Pedrero
- Nationality: Spanish
- Born: 30 July 1982 (age 43) Madrid, Spain

Sport
- Country: Spain
- Sport: Paratriathlon
- Disability class: LW11.5
Medal record
Women's para triathlon
Representing Spain
Paralympic Games
Bronze medal – third place	2020 Tokyo	PTWC
World Championships
Bronze medal – third place	2016 Rotterdam	PT1
Bronze medal – third place	2017 Rotterdam	PTWC
Bronze medal – third place	2021 Abu Dhabi	PTWC
Bronze medal – third place	2024 Torremolinos	Mixed relay
European Championships
Gold medal – first place	2018 Tartu	PTWC
Gold medal – first place	2021 Valencia	PTWC
Gold medal – first place	2023 Madrid	PTWC
Gold medal – first place	2024 Vichy	PTWC
Gold medal – first place	2025 Besançon	PTWC
Silver medal – second place	2016 Lisbon	PT1
Silver medal – second place	2017 Kitzbühel	PTWC

Eva María Moral Pedrero (born 30 July 1982), also simply known as Eva Moral, is a Spanish paratriathlete. She made her first Paralympic appearance representing Spain at the 2020 Summer Paralympics.

== Career ==
She took up the sport of paratriathlon at the age of 32 in 2014 and also took part in able bodied triathlon events before her accident.

She claimed bronze medal in the 2020 Tokyo|PTWC at the 2020 Summer Paralympics.
