= Lauren Parker =

Australian paratriathlete

Lauren Parker OAM
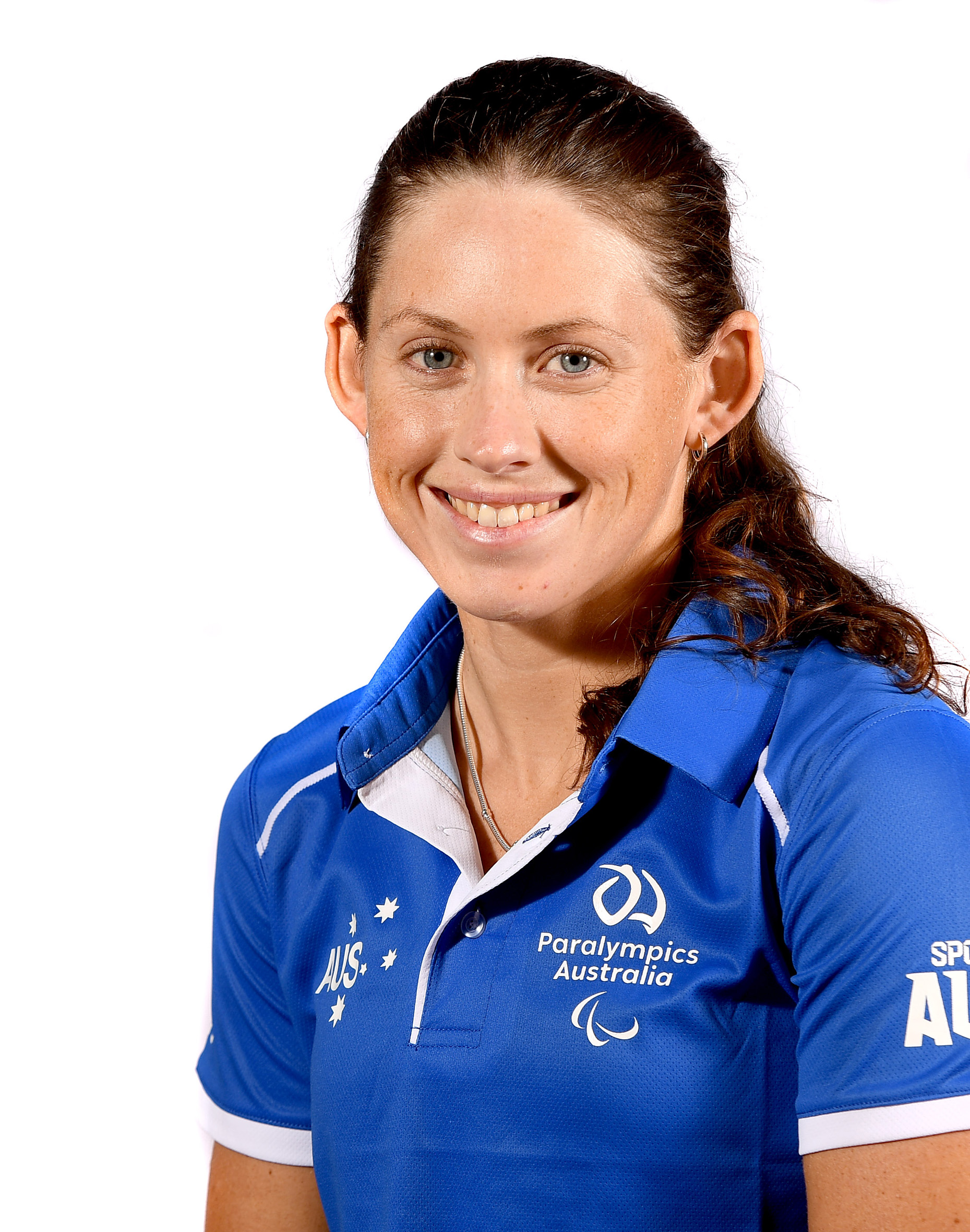
- Lauren Parker in 2019

Personal information
- Nationality: Australian
- Born: 15 December 1988 (age 37) Newcastle, New South Wales, Australia

Sport
- Sport: Paratriathlon; Para-cycling; Para biathlon Paralympic cross-country skiing
Medal record
Representing Australia
Women's paratriathlon
Paralympic Games
Gold medal – first place	2024 Paris	PTWC
Silver medal – second place	2020 Tokyo	PTWC
World Championships
Gold medal – first place	2019 Lausanne	PTWC
Gold medal – first place	2021 Abu Dhabi	PTWC
Gold medal – first place	2022 Abu Dhabi	PTWC
Gold medal – first place	2023 Ponteverde	PTWC
Gold medal – first place	2025 Wollongong	PTWC
Gold medal – first place	2026 Pontevedra	PTWC
Silver medal – second place	2025 Wollongong	Mixed relay
Bronze medal – third place	2018 Gold Coast	PTWC
Bronze medal – third place	2024 Torremolinos	PTWC
Oceania Championships
Gold medal – first place	2019 Newcastle	PTWC
Gold medal – first place	2020 Newcastle	PTWC
Gold medal – first place	2022 Stockton	PTWC
Gold medal – first place	2023 Stockton	PTWC
Commonwealth Games
Bronze medal – third place	2018 Gold Coast	PTWC
Women's para-cycling
Paralympic Games
Gold medal – first place	2024 Paris	Road race H1–4
Silver medal – second place	2024 Paris	Road time trial H1–3
Road World Championships
Gold medal – first place	2023 Glasgow	Time trial H3
Gold medal – first place	2025 Ronse	Time trial H3
Gold medal – first place	2025 Ronse	Road race H3
Gold medal – first place	2026 Huntsville	Time trial H3
Silver medal – second place	2023 Glasgow	Road race H3
Silver medal – second place	2024 Zurich	Time trial H3
Silver medal – second place	2025 Ronse	Mixed team relay H1–5
Bronze medal – third place	2026 Huntsville	Road Race H3
Bronze medal – third place	2026 Huntsville	Mixed Road race H1-5

Lauren Parker OAM (born 15 December 1988) is an Australian para-triathlete and para-cyclist. She won a silver medal (triathlon) at the 2020 Summer Paralympics and two gold (triathlon and cycling) and silver (cycling) medals at the 2024 Summer Paralympics. She has won multiple World Triathlon Championships in Women's PTWC.

She competed in para biathlon and cross country skiing at the 2026 Winter Paralympics.

== Personal life ==
Parker was born on 15 December 1988 in Belmont, New South Wales. She lives in Newcastle, New South Wales.

== Paratriathlon ==
Before having to transition to paratriathlon as a result of a serious training accident in April 2017, Parker was a successful triathlete. She took up triathlon at the age of 18 after being a successful junior swimmer. At the 2015 Ironman World Championship in Kona she finished second in the Women's 25–29 Age Group.

The training accident left Parker with a punctured lung, broken ribs, shoulder blade and pelvis, and damaged spinal cord. She spent six months in hospital and spinal rehabilitation unit. She turned to paratriathlon and competes in the PTWC-class for wheelchair athletes. After three months training, she won the bronze medal at the 2018 Commonwealth Games, Gold Coast, Queensland.

At the 2020 Summer Paralympics, Parker finished second and won the silver medal with a time of 1:06.26. She was just 0.01 of a second behind the Gold medal winner Kendall Gretsch of the United States.

Major PTWC-class international paratriathlon results:

- 2018 – OTU Paratriathlon Oceania Championship, St Kilda Melbourne – 2nd place
- 2018 – ITU Paratriathlon World Cup, Devonport – 2nd place
- 2018 – Commonwealth Games, Gold Coast – Bronze medal
- 2018 – ITU World Paratriathlon Series Yokohama – 2nd place
- 2018 – ITU Paratriathlon World Cup, Besançon – 1st place
- 2018 – ITU World Paratriathlon Series, Iseo Franciacorta – 1st place
- 2018 – ITU World Triathlon Grand Final, Gold Coast – Bronze medal
- 2019 – ITU World Triathlon Grand Final, Lausanne – Gold medal
- 2020 – Summer Paralympic Games, Tokyo – Silver medal -Women's PTWC
- 2021 – ITU World Triathlon Championship Series, Abu Dhabi – Gold medal – Women's PTWC
- 2022 – ITU World Triathlon Championship Series, Abu Dhabi – Gold medal – Women's PTWC
- 2024 – Summer Paralympic Games, Paris – Gold medal in Women's PTWC
- 2025 - World Triathlon Para Championships, Wollongong - Gold Medal Women's PTWC and silver medal Mixed Relay.

== Para cycling ==
- 2023 UCI Para-cycling Road World Championships in Glasgow – her first major international para cycling event, Parker won the gold medal in the Women's Time Trial H3 and the silver medal in the Women's Road Race H3.
- 2024 – Summer Paralympic Games, Paris – gold medal in Women's road race H1-4 and silver medal in the Women's road time trial H1-3.
- 2025 UCI Para-cycling Road World Championships in Ronse - gold medals in the Women's Time Trial H3 and Women's Road Race H3.

== Para biathlon and cross country skiing ==
Parker took up skiing in June 2025. Her first international competitions were at the World Cup and Continental Cup in Canada in December 2025.

At the 2026 Winter Paralympics, she competed in biathlon and cross country skiing. Biathlon results - 9th in Women's Individual - Sitting, 10th in Women's Sprint pursuit - Sitting and 13th in Women's Sprint - Sitting. Cross-country skiing results - 8th in Women’s 10km classical - Sitting, 10th in Women's 20km interval start - Sitting and 13th in Women's Sprint - Sitting.

== Recognition ==
- 2018 – New South Wales Institute of Sport Ian Thorpe OAM Outstanding Achievement Award for having come back from a horrific training accident the previous year to qualify, compete and win bronze at the Gold Coast 2018 Commonwealth Games; Sport NSW Athlete of the Year with a Disability; Triathlon Australia Chris Hewitt Emerging Athlete Award;
- 2019 – Australian Women's Health Sport Awards Comeback of the Year; New South Wales Institute of Sport Ian Thorpe OAM Outstanding Achievement Award recognised Parker's ongoing battle to overcome her tragic training accident in 2017, with the paratriathlete ending the 2019 season as a world champion; Sport NSW Athlete of the Year with a Disability.
- 2021 – Triathlon Australia Performance of the Year; Triathlon Australia Para-triathlon Female Performance of the Year; Triathlon Australia Athlete's Athlete of the Year
- 2022 – Sport NSW Athlete of the Year with a Disability; Triathlon Australia Performance of the Year; Triathlon Australia Para-triathlon Female Performance of the Year
- 2023 – Triathlon Australia Para-triathlon Female Performance of the Year; Sport NSW Athlete of the Year with a Disability, AIS Sport Performance Awards - Female Para-Athlete of the Year; AusCycling Women's Road Para-cyclist of the Year
- 2024 – Flag bearer with James Turner at the Closing Ceremony of the 2024 Summer Paralympics in Paris, France.
- 2024 – New South Wales Institute of Sport Ian Thorpe AM Outstanding Achievement Award, Sport NSW Athlete of the Year with a Disability
- 2024 – Australian Paralympian of the Year and Australian Female Paralympian of the Year
- 2024 – AIS Sport Performance Awards - Female Para-Athlete of the Year and Performance of the Year
- 2024 – Triathlon Australia Para-triathlon Female Performance of the Year
- 2024 – AusCycling Women’s Road Para-cyclist of the Year
- 2025 – Medal of the Order of Australia in the Australia Day Honours.
- 2025 - AusCycling Women’s Road Para-cyclist of the Year-
- 2026 - Paralympics Australia Female Athlete of the Year
