= Our Lady of the Bay Catholic High School =

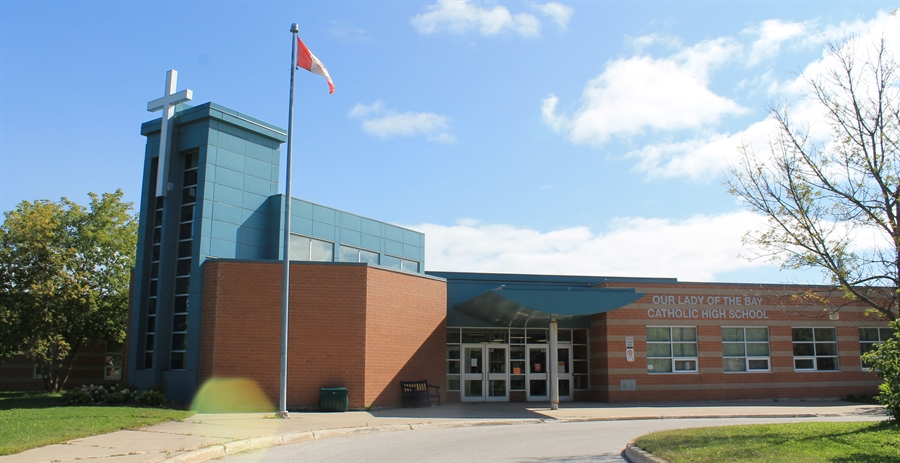
- Front Doors of Our Lady of the Bay

Location
- 160 Collins Street; Collingwood, Ontario, L9Y 4R1; Canada; 44.48938°N 80.20760°W

Information
- Other name: OLB
- Former name: Jean Vanier Catholic High School
- School type: Secondary school
- Motto: In Trying We Succeed (Prior to being named Our Lady of the Bay)
- Religious affiliation: Christian
- Denomination: Roman Catholic
- Founded: September 3, 1985 (As Jean Vanier) 2020 (As Our Lady of the Bay)
- School board: Simcoe Muskoka Catholic District School Board
- Area trustee: Shawn Cooper
- School number: 723630
- Principal: Edward Baker
- Grades: 9 to 12
- Enrollment: 620 (2024-2025)
- Language: English
- Colours: Maroon and Grey
- Mascot: Thunder Bird
- Team name: Our Lady of the Bay Hurricanes
- Website: olb.schools.smcdsb.on.ca

Our Lady of the Bay Catholic High School is an English Catholic secondary school located in Collingwood, Ontario. It is under administration by the Simcoe Muskoka Catholic District School Board. The school has about 620 students (as of 2024/25 school year) enrolled from Collingwood, Wasaga Beach, Clearview Township, and the Town of the Blue Mountains. The school is located at 160 Collins Street, Collingwood, Ontario, L9Y 4R1, Canada. The current principal is Edward Baker.

The school was formerly named Jean Vanier Catholic High School, in honour of Jean Vanier, a Canadian Catholic philosopher known for helping those with developmental disabilities. However, it was renamed in 2020 shortly after reports came out revealing his involvement in abusive sexual relationships.

The school offers numerous sports programs, such as alpine skiing and track and field. The school's team name is the OLB Hurricanes.

== Notable alumni ==
- Leanne Taylor, paratriathlete
- Michaela Gosselin, paraalipine skier.

== See also ==
- Education in Ontario
- List of secondary schools in Ontario
