= Lasse Lührs =

German triathlete (born 1996)

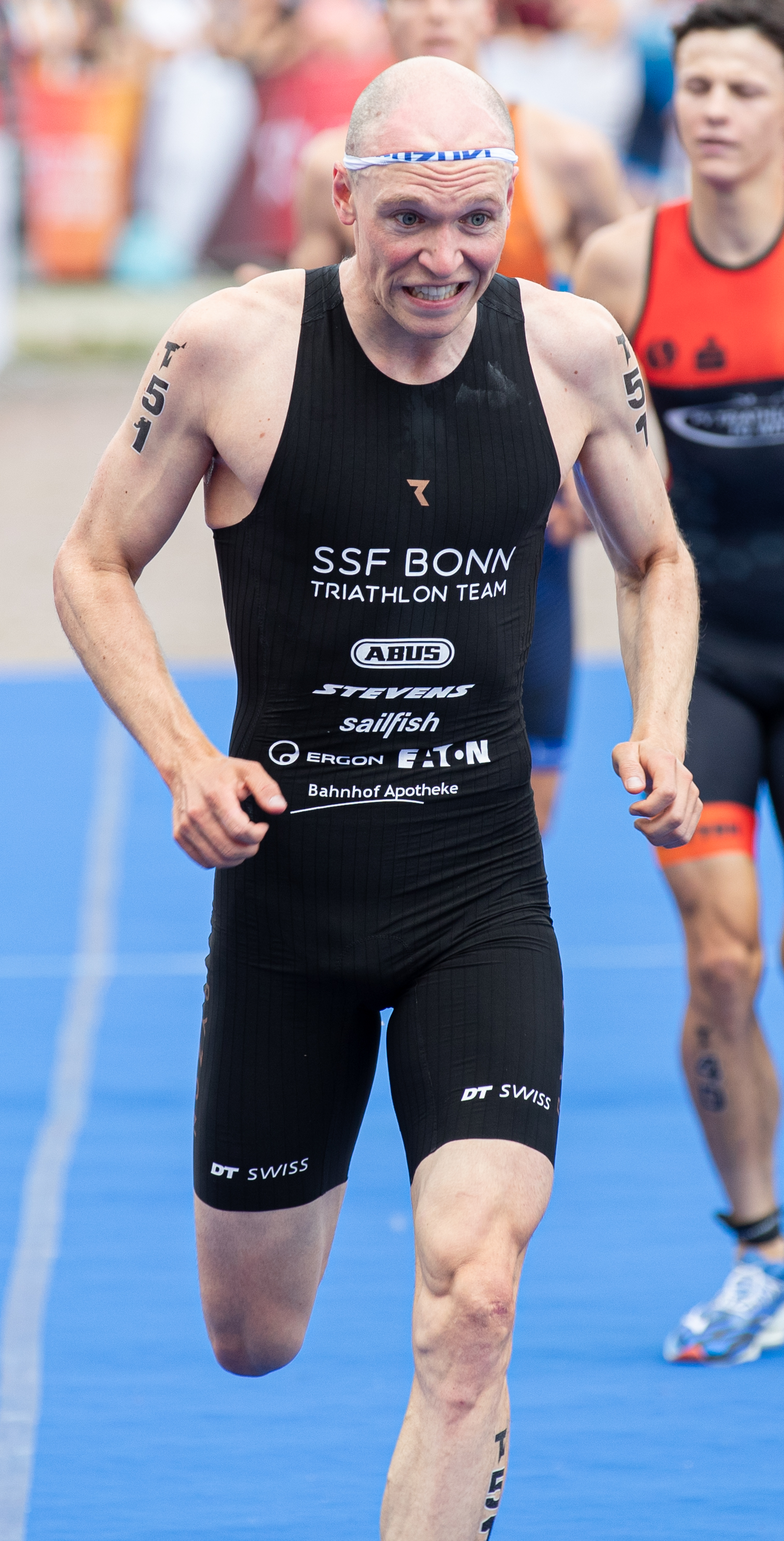
- Lührs in 2025

Personal information
- Born: 16 May 1996 (age 30) Wingst, Lower Saxony, Germany

Sport
- Sport: Triathlon
Medal record
Men's triathlon
Representing Germany
Olympic Games
Gold medal – first place	2024 Paris	Mixed relay
World Championships
Gold medal – first place	2024 Hamburg	Mixed relay

Lasse Lührs (born 16 May 1996) is a German triathlete. He was a gold medalist at the World Triathlon Mixed Relay Championships, and also won a gold medal in the mixed relay at the 2024 Olympic Games.

== Career ==
At junior level, Germany's national junior champion and in June 2014, he became Junior European Champion in the team sprint with the German team at the European Triathlon Championships in Kitzbühel, Austria. He won gold in the junior race at the 2015 European Cup in Vienna, Austria. In July 2015 he became European junior champion in Geneva, Switzerland, where he also won the mixed relay silver medal at the championships.

In 2019, he finished second in the World Cup triathlon event in Madrid.

He became triathlon German champion in the sprint distance in 2022. That year, he finished in ninth place in the overall ranking of the 2022 World Triathlon Championship Series. He finished in fifth place in the 2023 Grand Final of the World Triathlon Championship Series in Pontevedra, Spain.

In July 2024, he was a gold medalist at the World Triathlon Mixed Relay Championships. He qualified for the 2024 Olympic Games in Paris, France, where in August 2024 as a member of the German triathlon mixed relay team alongside Tim Hellwig, Lisa Tertsch, and Laura Lindemann he won the gold medal ahead of the USA and Great Britain teams, the country's first Olympic medal in triathlon for 16 years.

== Personal life ==
From Wingst, Lower Saxony, he was educated in Potsdam. He trained for a while in Alicante in Spain, and from 2021 was based in Bonn, Germany. He graduated from IU International University of Applied Sciences.
