= Mona Francis =

French paratriathlete (born 1990)

Personal information
- Born: 26 December 1990 (age 35) Montpellier, France

Sport
- Sport: Paratriathlon
- Disability class: PTWC
Medal record
Women's paratriathlon
Representing France
World Championships
| Silver medal – second place | 2023 Ponteverde | Mixed relay |
ITU European Championships
| Gold medal – first place | 2022 Olsztyn | PTWC |
| Silver medal – second place | 2021 Valencia | PTWC |
| Silver medal – second place | 2024 Vichy | PTWC |
| Bronze medal – third place | 2018 Tartu | PTWC |
| Bronze medal – third place | 2023 Madrid | PTWC |

Mona Francis (born 26 December 1990) is a French paratriathlete of Lebanese descent who competes in international triathlon competitions. She is a European champion and has competed at the 2020 and 2024 Summer Paralympics but did not medal.
