= Sylvain Fridelance =

Swiss triathlete (born 1995)

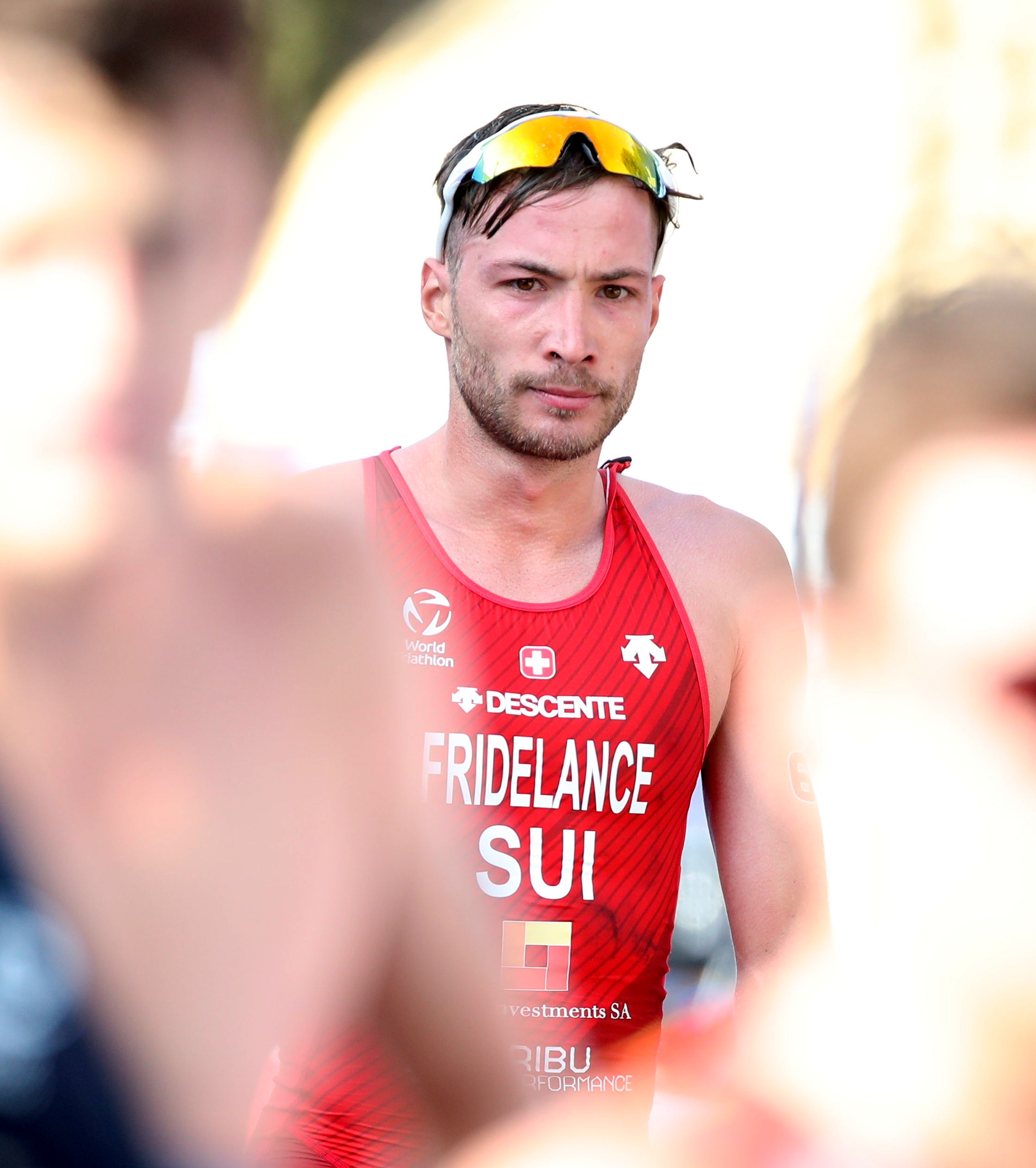
- Fridelance in 2022

Personal information
- Nationality: Swiss
- Born: 14 July 1995 (age 30)

Sport
- Sport: Triathlon
Medal record
Men's triathlon
Representing Switzerland
World Championships
Bronze medal – third place	2023 Hamburg	Mixed relay

Sylvain Fridelance (born 14 July 1995) is a Swiss triathlete. He competed at the 2024 Paris Olympics.

== Career ==
He was a silver medalist at the 2018 European Triathlon Championships in Glasgow.

In 2023, he was a bronze medalist at the World Triathlon Mixed Relay Championships in the mixed relay in Hamburg.

He was called-up to the Swiss mixed relay team for the 2024 Summer Olympics in Paris in August 2024.

== Personal life ==
He is from the canton of Vaud.
