= Summer Rappaport =

American triathlete

Personal information
- Full name: Summer Rappaport
- Nationality: American
- Born: 25 July 1991 (age 35) Denver, Colorado, U.S.
- Height: 5'9”
- Website: www.summerrappaport.com

Sport
- Sport: Triathlon

Summer Rappaport (née Cook) is a former American professional triathlete. At the 2020 Summer Olympics she competed in the women's triathlon race, placing 14th. During the 2019 ITU World Triathlon Series Rappaport took fifth in the final rankings.

== Early life ==
Rappaport graduated from Mountain Range High School in Westminster, Colorado in 2009. She attended Villanova University, where she was on the NCAA swim, cross country, and track and field teams. Rappaport graduated in 2013 with a degree in political science. Due to her high performance in both swimming and running, she was recruited by USA Triathlon's collegiate recruitment program, which began her triathlon career.

== Career ==
In 2014, Rappaport finished 5th at the Mixed Relay Pan American Championships. In the following season, she finished 2nd at the ITU Triathlon World Cup event in Alanya.

For the 2016 racing season, Rappaport won the 2016 ITU World Triathlon Series event in Edmonton, in what would be one of ten career podiums in the World Triathlon Championship Series between 2016 and 2025, but her only gold. This was alongside World Cup victories in Chengdu (the first of eight career World Cup wins), Tongyeong, and second place finishes in Salinas and Alanya, with the latter bettering her placing from the previous year. She finished the year ranked 19th in the World Triathlon Series. The next racing year, in 2017, Rappaport took gold at Miyazaki, Tongyeong (for the second year running) and Yucatan in the ITU Triathlon World Cup. She finished 2017 ranked 10th in the ITU World Triathlon Series.

In 2018, Rappaport took gold at Miyazaki and Antwerp in the ITU Triathlon World Cup. Later on, in the run-up to the Leeds ITU World Triathlon Series race, Rappaport's bike was broken in transit and was ultimately registered a DNF in the race, having struggled with her mindset. She would finish the year ranked 25th in the World Triathlon Series, a drop of 15 places over the previous year. The following year Rappaport rebounded by finishing on the podium in three races in the World Triathlon Series level, with second places at Edmonton and Yokohama, and third at the Hamburg race. She also took gold in the Huatulco World Cup event. She finished 2019 ranking 5th in the Series, which was her best season placing to date. The 2020 and 2021 seasons were significantly blighted by the global covid pandemic.

A highly accomplished swimmer and runner, the bike leg would remain Rappaport's Achilles' heel in draft-legal racing, culminating in a serious crash in 2023 that permanently compromised her remaining career. Rappaport, who suffered from anxiety in riding in packs due to an early career fall, suffered a severe bike crash at the Super League Triathlon event in Malibu, resulting in a broken jaw, a broken elbow, and a misdiagnosed sacral stress reaction. She was unable to recover sufficiently to challenge for a place at the 2024 Summer Olympics in Paris, and did not feature at the top end of Championship Series races thereafter. A silver medal at a tier two World Cup event in 2024 in Tongyeong would be her final trip to a major podium.

Rappaport announced her retirement from the sport in 2025.

== Personal life ==
In 2018, she married Ian Rappaport.
