= Tim Hellwig =

German triathlete (born 1999)

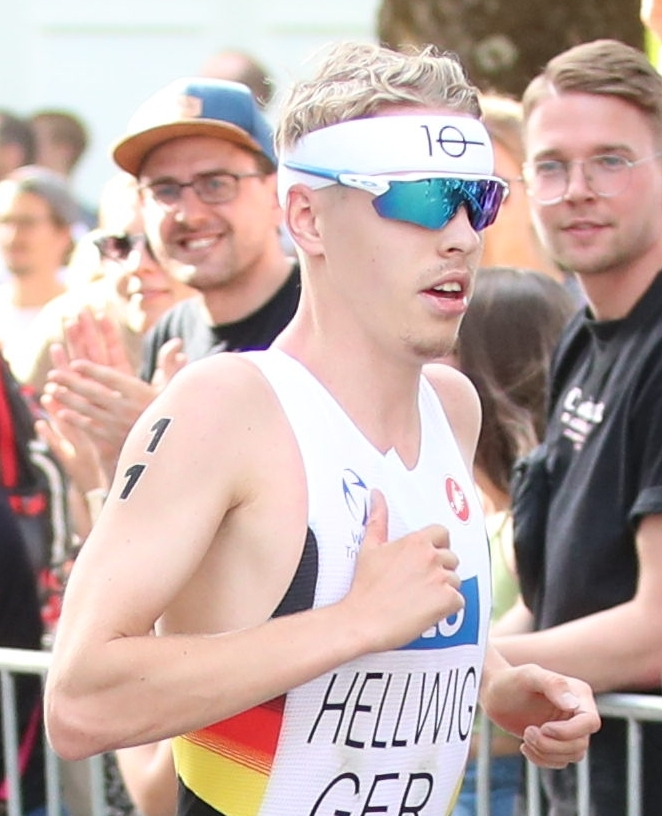
- Hellwig in 2022

Personal information
- Nationality: German
- Born: 30 June 1999 (age 27) Neustadt an der Weinstraße, Rhineland-Palatinate, Germany

Sport
- Sport: Triathlon
Medal record
Men's triathlon
Representing Germany
Olympic Games
Gold medal – first place	2024 Paris	Mixed relay
World Triathlon Mixed Relay Championships
Gold medal – first place	2023 Hamburg	Mixed relay

Tim Hellwig (born 30 June 1999) is a German triathlete. He was a gold medalist at the World Triathlon Mixed Relay Championships in 2023. He then also won a gold medal in the mixed team relay at the 2024 Olympic Games.

== Biography ==
From the German state of Rhineland-Palatinate, he was German junior champion in the triathlon in 2017, and retained the title again in 2018. He won the silver medal at the European Championships in Tartu, Estonia in 2018. He became German senior sprint champion in 2021, and that year won his first World Triathlon Championship Series event in Hamburg, Germany in September 2021.

In 2023, he won the African Triathlon Cup, and two Asian legs of the World Cup, in Chengdu, China and Tongyeong, South Korea. That year, he was a gold medalist at the World Triathlon Mixed Relay Championships in the mixed relay in Hamburg.

In May 2024, he qualified for the 2024 Olympic Games by finishing seventh at the Olympic test event in Paris, France. Competing at the Games in August 2024 as a member of the German triathlon mixed relay team alongside Lasse Lührs, Lisa Tertsch, and Laura Lindemann, he won the gold medal ahead of the USA and Great Britain teams, the country's first Olympic medal in triathlon for 16 years. Hellwig also earned his first podium finish in Supertri in Toulouse and finished in the top five in every race he ran, finishing his debut Supertri season in third place overall and winning the men’s bike discipline. He ended the year ranked as the world’s 29th best triathlete, but had to undergo surgery on the meniscus in his knee having carried the injury through a lot of 2024.

In March 2026, Hellwig had two runner-up places at the World Triathlon Cup events in Lanzarote and Haikou, in China.
