= Cassandre Beaugrand =

French triathlete (born 1997)

Cassandre Beaugrand CLH OLY
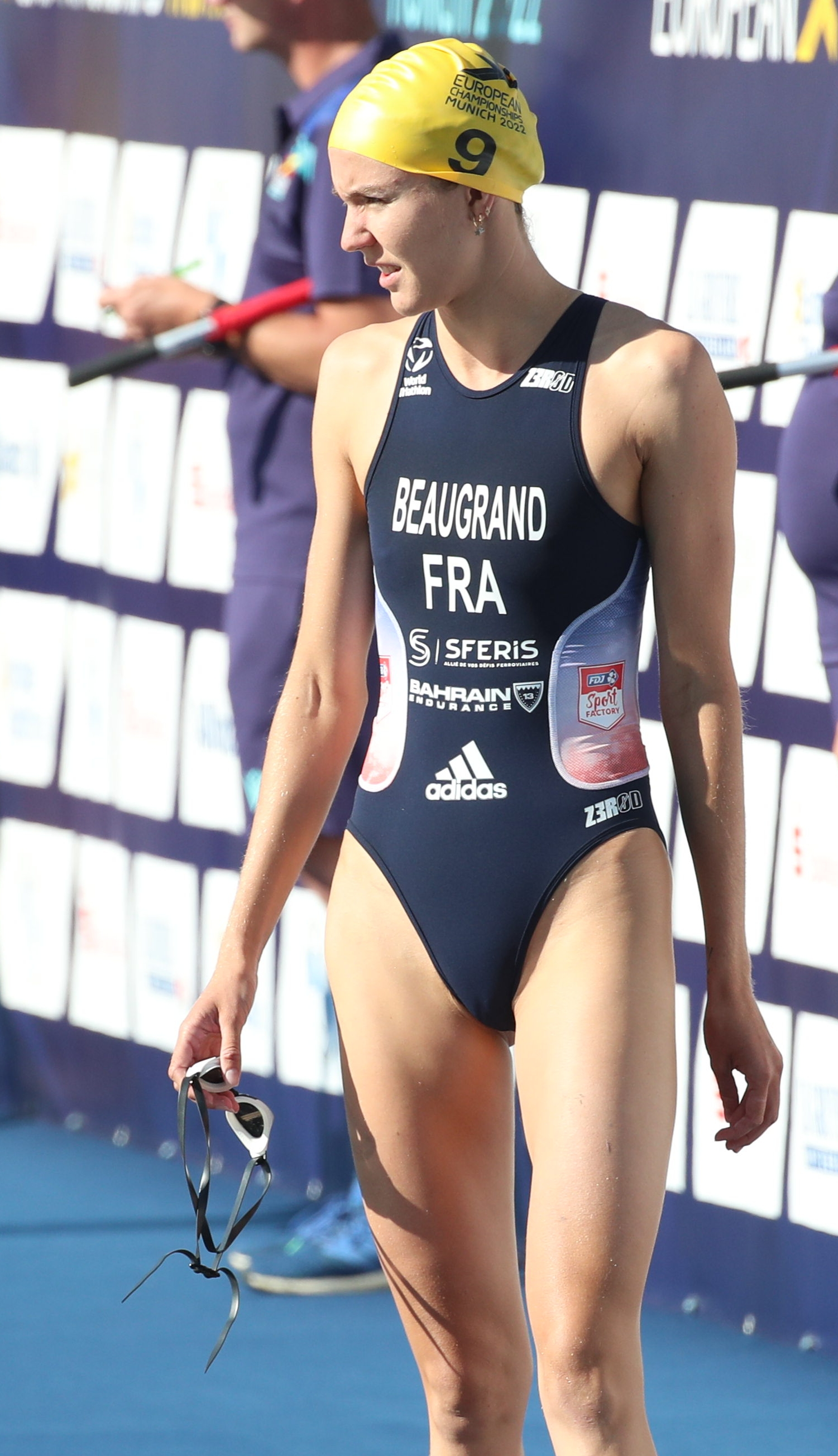
- Beaugrand at the 2022 Euro Championship Circuit in Nice

Personal information
- Born: 23 May 1997 (age 29) Livry-Gargan, France

Sport
- Country: France
- Sport: Triathlon
Medal record
Women's triathlon
Representing (France) France
Olympic Games
Gold medal – first place	2024 Paris	Individual
Bronze medal – third place	2020 Tokyo	Mixed relay
World Championships
Gold medal – first place	2024	Elite
Gold medal – first place	2026	Elite
Europe Triathlon Championships
Gold medal – first place	2022 Munich	Mixed relay

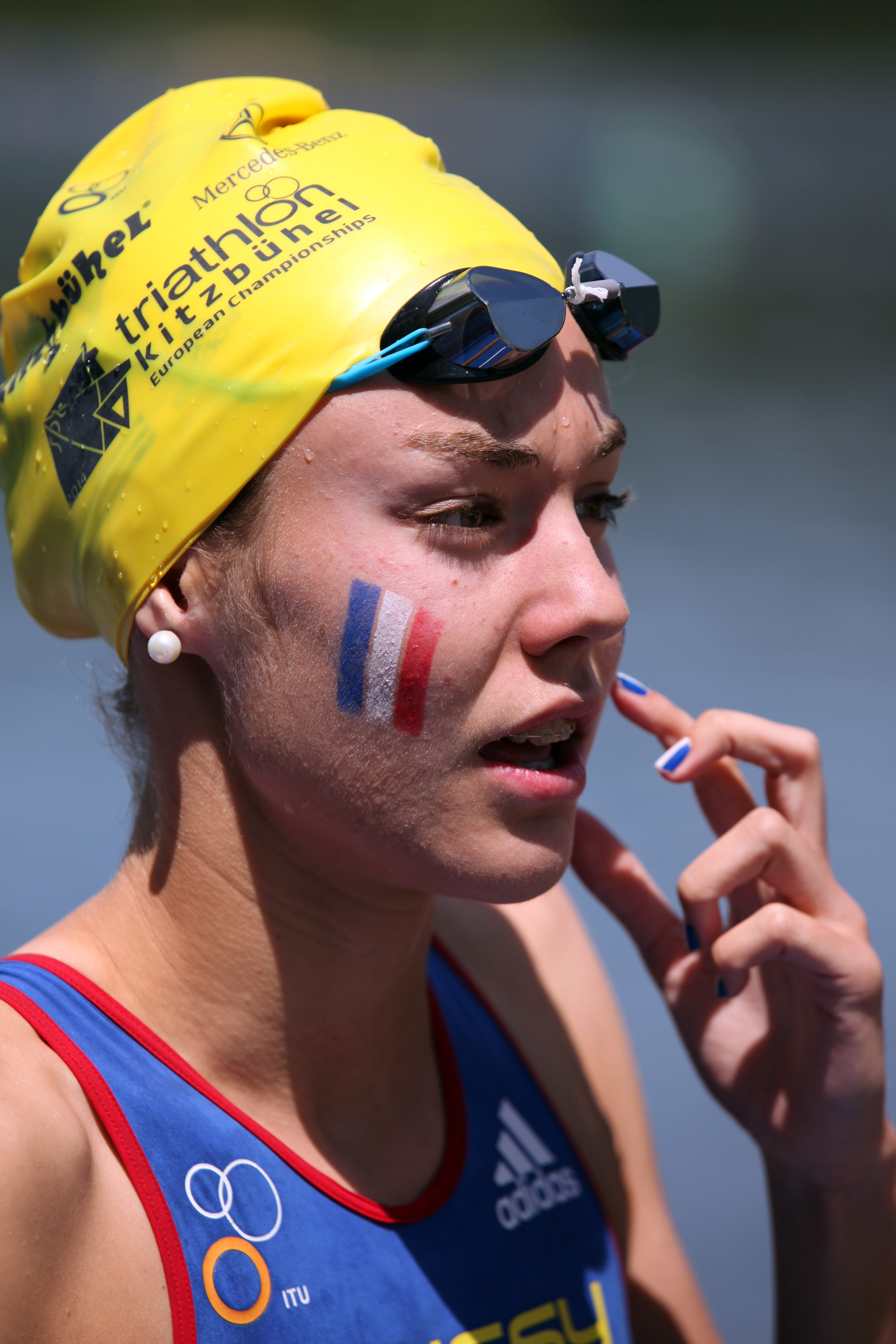
Beaugrand at the European Championships in Kitzbuhel, 2014

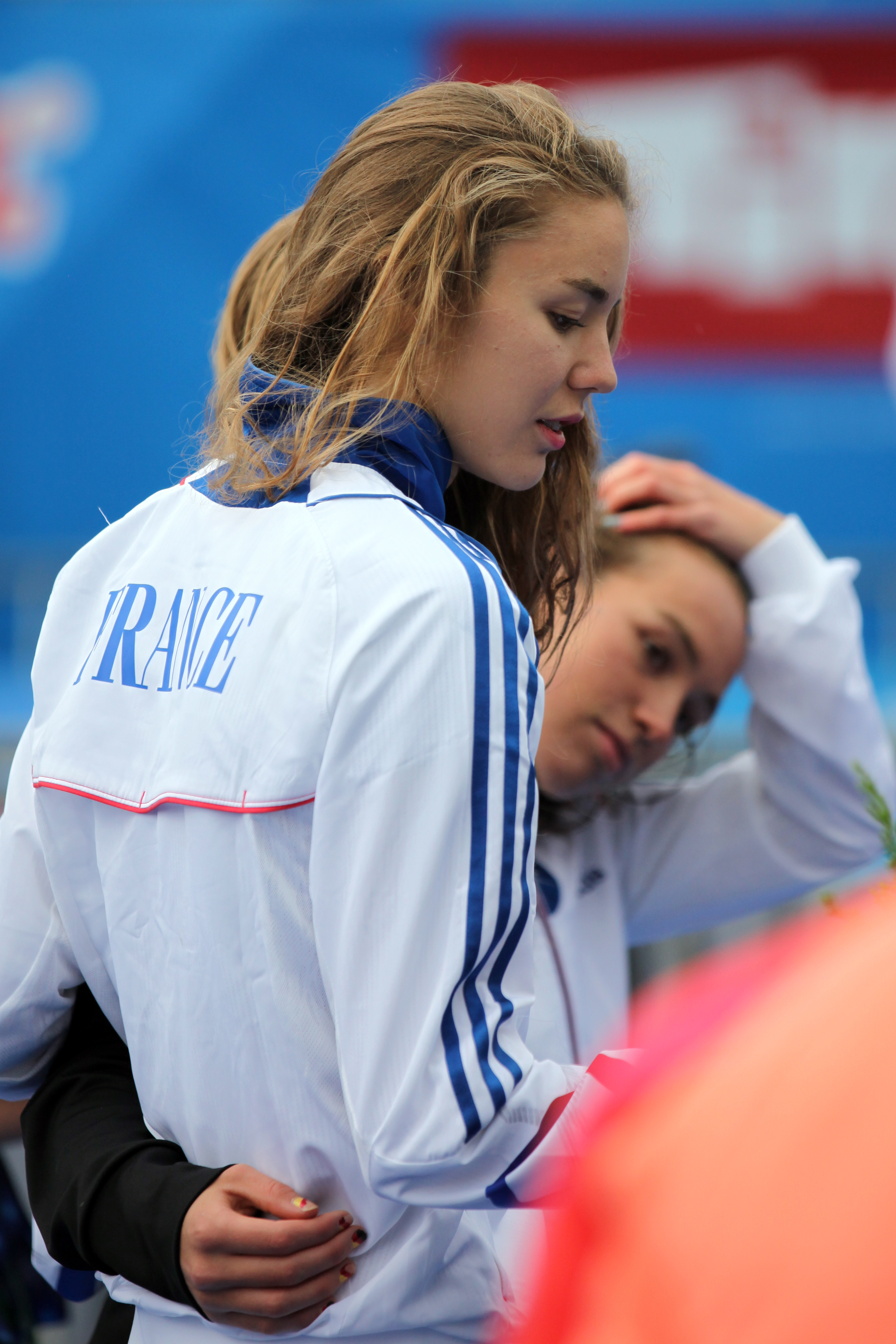
Beaugrand at the European Championships in Kitzbuhel, 2014

Cassandre Beaugrand (born 23 May 1997) is a French triathlete. She is the only female triathlete (and the second ever after Alistair Brownlee) to have won a gold medal in the three major competitions, Olympic Games (2024), World Championships (2024) and European Championships (2022).

== Early life ==
From 2006 to 2011, Cassandre Beaugrand represented her hometown club Livry-Gargan Athlétisme and since then has been trained by her father Ludovic Beaugrand.

== Triathlon career ==
In 2012 Beaugrand joined AS Monaco Athlétisme and Saint-Raphaël Triathlon, which she left in 2014 to represent Poissy Triathlon in the prestigious French Grand Prix de Triathlon circuit. On 28 September 2014, Beaugrand took part in the Grande Finale of the Club Championship Circuit in Nice and won both the individual and the club ranking, at the same time this race served as the Elite French Championship.

Since 2012, Cassandre Beaugrand has taken part in ITU competitions. At the age of 15, she placed second at the European Championships in Aguilas (1 September 2012) in the Team Relay Youth category (16–17 years). In 2013, she won the silver medal at the French Championships (1 June 2013) in the junior category although she was still in the first year of the youth category (cadette, 16–17 years), and at the European Championships in Holten (27 June 2013) she won the gold medal in the Team Relay Youth category. In 2014, she won her first individual gold medal at the Junior European Cup event in Quarteira (13 April 2014) and at the European Junior Championships in Kitzbuhel (20 June 2014) she placed third. At the Junior World Championships in Edmonton (29 August 2014) Beaugrand won the silver medal.

In 2013 and 2014, Beaugrand also took part in ITU Elite races although she still belonged to the Youth category: at the French Championships on 29 September 2013 she placed fourth and at the European Sprint Cup in Bratislava (18 May 2014) she won the silver medal. At the Mixed Relay World Championships in Hamburg (13 July 2014) Beaugrand, still being in the youth category (cadette, 16–17 years), also won the silver medal in the Elite category.

In the French media, in June 2014 Beaugrand was hailed as France's new hope for national and international triathlon events, but Beaugrand was already internationally known from 2013 on when she won the 1500m race at the EYOF (European Olympic Youth Festival) on 17 July 2013 in Utrecht.

Beaugrand is also the French 2013 and 2014 Youth Champion in cross country, and in 2013 and 2014 she also set the new national records for 1500m in her age class (youth/cadette). On 27 October 2014 Beaugrand also set a new youth record on the 10 km distance (called semi-marathon or Voie Royale) in Saint-Denis.

Beaugrand also competes in Super League Triathlon. She finished the 2018 Championship season in 3rd place and was 8th in 2021.

On 31 July 2021, she won the bronze medal at the 2020 Tokyo Olympics in the mixed relay event. Beaugrand won the first Super League Triathlon Championship Series event of the 2022 Season in London, where she finished ahead of Taylor Spivey and Georgia Taylor Brown, however was eliminated from the second event, after struggling with unfavourable conditions on the bike.

On 23 April 2022, Beaugrand set a Women's Run Record for Arena Games Triathlon racing on her way to victory at Arena Games Triathlon London 2022.

In August 2022, she won the gold medal at the 2022 European Triathlon Championships in the mixed relay event.

Beaugrand has set good times in swimming. For a 200-meter swim, her record is 2'07"25.

On 31 July 2024 she won the gold medal in the individual event at the 2024 Olympic Games, which took place in her home city of Paris with the swimming taking place in the River Seine. She credited her victory to the recent move to England, where she trained in Loughborough, helping her to get used to compete in the rain.

On 20 October 2024, she won the gold medal in the individual event at the 2024 World Championships.

== Personal life ==
Beaugrand lived in Antibes where she was coached by her father and in 2014/15 was attending the local Lycée Audiberti.. The local swimming club CN Antibes served as her training base.

At the end of 2024, she relocated to Girona, Spain, where she currently trains.

== Results ==
=== Triathlon ===
The table shows the most significant podium results achieved on the national and international triathlon circuits since 2014.

Individual Results
Year	Competition	Country	Position	Time
2026	WTCS London	United Kingdom	1st place, gold medalist(s)	00:56:06
2026	WTCS Quiberon	France	1st place, gold medalist(s)	00:58:29
2026	WTCS Alghero	Italy	1st place, gold medalist(s)	01:53:49
2025	WTCS Fréjus	France	1st place, gold medalist(s)	00:56:43
2025	WTCS Hamburg	Germany	2nd place, silver medalist(s)	00:56:29
2025	WTCS Alghero	Italy	1st place, gold medalist(s)	01:55:55
2025	Triathlon World Cup – Super-sprint Indoor Liévin	France	1st place, gold medalist(s)	00:10:19
2024	World Championship – Overall Ranking		1st place, gold medalist(s)	4,000 points
2024	WTCS Torremolinos	Spain	1st place, gold medalist(s)	01:56:45
2024	WTCS Hamburg	Germany	1st place, gold medalist(s)	00:55:19
2024	Paris Olympic Games	France	1st place, gold medalist(s)	01:54:55
2024	WTCS Cagliari	Italy	1st place, gold medalist(s)	01:47:25
2024	European Cup – Quarteira	Portugal	2nd place, silver medalist(s)	01:56:57
2023	World Championship – Overall Ranking		2nd place, silver medalist(s)	4,410 points
2023	WTCS Pontevedra	Spain	3rd place, bronze medalist(s)	01:53:50
2023	Test event (Triathlon)	France	2nd place, silver medalist(s)	01:51:46
2023	WTCS Sunderland	United Kingdom	1st place, gold medalist(s)	00:59:53
2023	World Sprint Championship	Germany	1st place, gold medalist(s)	00:21:35
2023	European Cup – Quarteira	Portugal	1st place, gold medalist(s)	01:56:29
2022	WTCS Montreal	Canada	2nd place, silver medalist(s)	00:24:07
2022	WTCS Leeds	United Kingdom	1st place, gold medalist(s)	00:59:03
2022	European Cup – Sprint Melilla	Spain	1st place, gold medalist(s)	00:52:00
2021	European Cup – Sprint Melilla	Spain	1st place, gold medalist(s)	00:57:07
2019	WTS Hamburg	Germany	2nd place, silver medalist(s)	00:59:31
2018	2018 European Triathlon Championships	United Kingdom	3rd place, bronze medalist(s)	02:00:57
2018	WTS Hamburg	Germany	1st place, gold medalist(s)	00:58:06
2018	French Championship – Short Distance	France	1st place, gold medalist(s)	01:01:56
2017	French Championship – Short Distance	France	1st place, gold medalist(s)	00:55:34
2016	European Sprint Championship	France	3rd place, bronze medalist(s)	00:58:32
2015	French Championship – Short Distance	France	3rd place, bronze medalist(s)	01:01:05
2014	French Championship – Short Distance	France	1st place, gold medalist(s)	01:00:31
2014	European Cup – Bratislava	Slovakia	2nd place, silver medalist(s)	01:03:57

Mixed Relay Results
Year	Competition	Country	Position	Time
2025	WTCS Hamburg	Germany	2nd place, silver medalist(s)	01:16:55
2023	WTCS Sunderland	United Kingdom	1st place, gold medalist(s)	01:26:53
2022	European Triathlon Mixed Relay Championships	Germany	1st place, gold medalist(s)	01:25:30
2022	WTS Montreal	Canada	1st place, gold medalist(s)	01:27:14
2021	Olympic Mixed Relay	Japan	3rd place, bronze medalist(s)	01:24:04
2020	WTS Hamburg	Germany	1st place, gold medalist(s)	01:18:25
2020	European Clubs Championship	Portugal	1st place, gold medalist(s)	01:22:12
2019	WTS Hamburg	Germany	1st place, gold medalist(s)	01:20:18
2019	WTS Tokyo	Japan	1st place, gold medalist(s)	01:26:33
2019	European Clubs Championship	Portugal	1st place, gold medalist(s)	01:21:05
2018	European Triathlon Mixed Relay Championships	United Kingdom	1st place, gold medalist(s)	01:15:07
2018	WTS Hamburg	Germany	1st place, gold medalist(s)	01:20:06
2018	WTS Nottingham	United Kingdom	3rd place, bronze medalist(s)	01:21:57
2018	French Mixed Relay Championship	France	1st place, gold medalist(s)	01:57:14
2018	European Clubs Championship	Portugal	1st place, gold medalist(s)	01:23:09
2017	European Triathlon Mixed Relay Championships	Austria	2nd place, silver medalist(s)	01:15:24
2016	European Clubs Championship	Spain	1st place, gold medalist(s)	01:23:32
2014	2014 World Triathlon Mixed Relay Championships	Germany	2nd place, silver medalist(s)	01:19:11

Wins in Grand Prix FFTRI
Year	Wins	Stages
2021	2	Dunkerque, Châteauroux
2019	3	Dunkerque, La Baule, Muret
2018	1	Paris
2017	3	Dunkerque, Quiberon, Valence
2014	1	Nice
Total	10	8 different cities

Wins in Supertri and Supertri E
Year	Wins	Stages
2025	–	(gold) in Supertri E
2024	1	Neom + (bronze) overall ranking + (silver) in Supertri E
2023	2	Malibu, Neom
2022	1	London (+ Arena Games London)
2019	1	Jersey
2018	1	Jersey + (bronze) overall ranking
Total	6	

=== Athletics records ===
Athletics Records
Date	Location	Competition	Distance	Position	Record	Time	Previous Holder
27 July 2014	(United States) Eugene	Final of World Junior Championships	1500 metres (track)	10th	French Cadet Record	4:17.04	Véronique Renties 4:19.02 on 19 August 1977 at Donetsk
31 December 2016	(Italy) Rome	Rome 10 km	10 kilometres (road)	(gold)	French Junior Record	33:12	Cécile Lejeune 34:22 on 18 December 2016 at Houilles
31 December 2016	(Italy) Rome	Rome 10 km	10 kilometres (road)	(gold)	French U23 Record	33:12	Jacqueline Gandar 33:13 on 18 October 2015 at Cremona
9 February 2025	Monaco	Monaco 5 km	5 kilometres (road)	4th	French Record	14:53	Sara Benfares 14:58 on 2 December 2022 at Hyères
4 April 2026	(France) Lille	Lille Urban Trail	10 kilometres (road)	7th	French Record	30:52	Alessia Zarbo 31:00 on 6 September 2025 at Prague
10 July 2026	Monaco	Herculis	3000 metres (track)	8th	French Record	8:32.86	Bouchra Ghezielle 8:35.41 on 1 July 2005 at Saint-Denis

== Awards and honours ==
Orders

- Knight of the Legion of Honour: 2024
