= Alexis Hanquinquant =

French paratriathlete (born 1985)

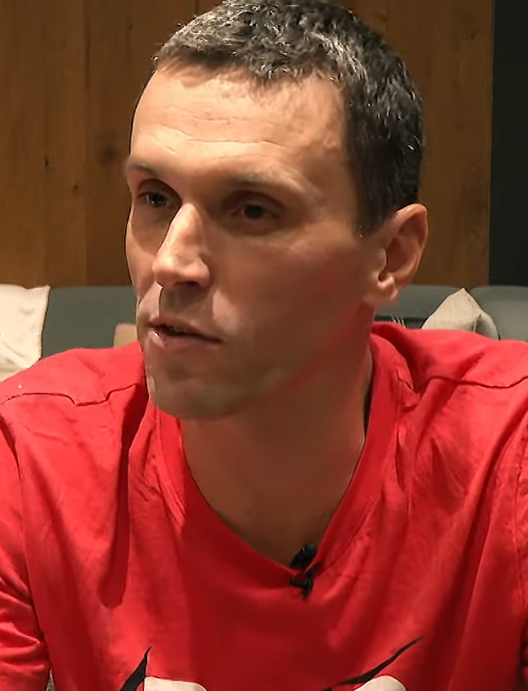
- Alexis Hanquinquant
- Born: 28 December 1985
- Occupation: Athlete

Alexis Hanquinquant (born 28 December 1985) is a French Paralympic triathlete. At the 2020 Summer Paralympics, he won a gold medal in the Men's PTS4 event.

In 2021, Hanquinquant was awarded the Knight of the Legion of Honour by the president of France Emmanuel Macron.

Hanquinquant passed the Olympic flame at the 2024 Cannes Film Festival for the premiere of Mickaël Gamrasni's documentary Olympiques! La France des Jeux, and was also featured in the France Télévisions critically acclaimed documentary À corps perdus, directed by Thierry Demaizière and Alban Teurlai. He was one of the five French Paralympians who lit the cauldron of the 2024 Summer Paralympics in Paris.

== Awards ==
Year	Paratriathlon	Country	Position	Time
2023
2023	Paratriathlon World Championships PTS4	Spain	Gold	00:59:03
2023	European Paratriathlon Championships PTS4	Spain	Gold	00:56:54
2022
2022	Paratriathlon World Championships PTS4	United Arab Emirates	Gold	01:00:45
2022	European Paratriathlon Championships PTS4	Poland	Gold	00:47:24
2022	French Paratriathlon Championships PTS4	France	Gold	01:01:24
2021	Tokyo Paralympic Games PTS4	Japan	Gold	00:59:58
2021	Paratriathlon World Championships PTS4	United Arab Emirates	Gold	00:58:54
2021	European Paratriathlon Championships PTS4	Spain	Gold	00:59:50
2021	French Paratriathlon Championships PTS4	France	Gold	00:57:22
2020	French Paratriathlon Championships PTS4	France	Gold	00:57:59
2019	French Paratriathlon Championships PTS4	France	Gold	00:59:49
2019	European Paratriathlon Championships PTS4	Spain	Gold	01:02:02
2019	Paratriathlon World Championships PTS4 2019	Switzerland	Gold	01:04:37
2018	French Paratriathlon Championships 2018 PTS4	France	Gold	01:01:49
2018	Paratriathlon World Championships 2018 PTS4	Australia	Gold	01:01:15
2018	European Paratriathlon Championships PTS4	Estonia	Gold	01:03:24
2017	Paratriathlon World Championships 2017 PTS4	Netherlands	Gold	01:04:15
2017	European Paratriathlon Championships PTS4	Australia	Gold	01:05:13
2017	French Paratriathlon Championships 2017 PTS4	France	Gold	01:03:51
2017	Paratriathlon World Cup Besançon PTS4	France	Gold	01:07:16
2017	Paratriathlon World Cup Gold Coast PTS4	Australia	Gold	01:02:24
2016	French Paratriathlon Championships 2016 PT4	France	Silver	00:58:42
