= Laura Lindemann =

German triathlete (born 1996)

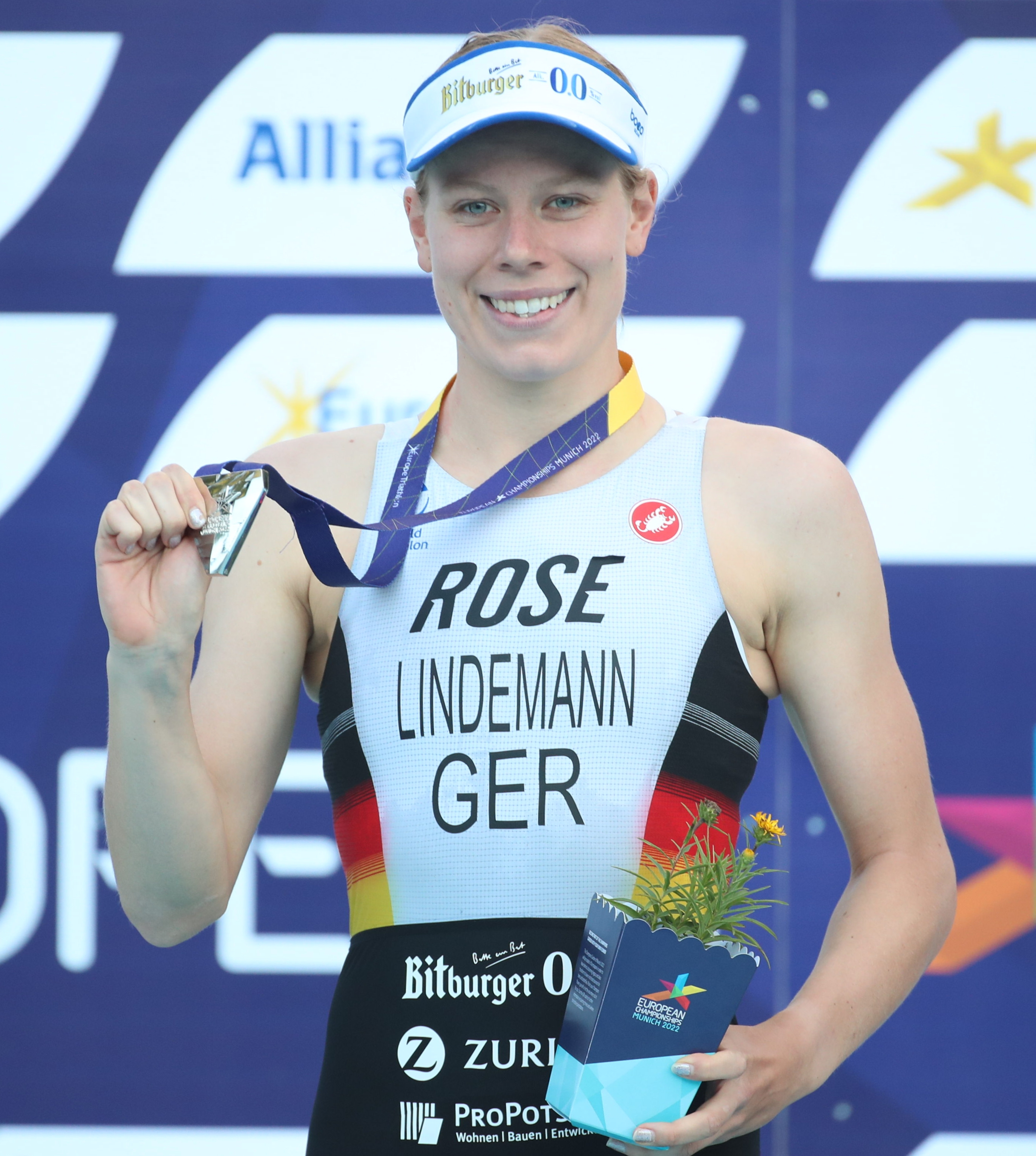
- Lindemann in 2022

Personal information
- Nationality: German
- Born: 26 June 1996 (age 30) Berlin, Germany
- Height: 168 cm (5 ft 6 in)
- Weight: 57 kg (126 lb)

Sport
- Sport: Triathlon
Medal record
Women's triathlon
Representing Germany
Olympic Games
Gold medal – first place	2024 Paris	Mixed relay
Europe Triathlon Championships
Silver medal – second place	2022 Munich	Individual
Silver medal – second place	2022 Munich	Mixed relay

Laura Lindemann (born 26 June 1996) is a German triathlete. She was a gold medal winner in the mixed relay event at the 2024 Summer Olympics in Paris. She previously also competed at the 2016 and 2020 Olympic Games. She was a silver medalist in the individual race and mixed team relay at the 2022 European Triathlon Championships.

== Career ==
She competed in the women's event at the 2016 Summer Olympics where she finished in 28th place overall.

She competed in the women's event at the delayed 2020 Summer Olympics in Tokyo, Japan, where she finished in eighth place overall. She also competed in the mixed relay event at the 2020 Summer Olympics. She won the individual and mixed team relay titles at the 2021 World Triathlon Championship Series Hamburg in September 2021.

She was leading the women’s individual race at the 2022 European Triathlon Championships at the transition from bike to run in Munich, Germany, in August 2022, before eventually finishing in second place to win the silver medal behind Non Stanford of Great Britain. Competing in the mixed team relay at the championships she ran the final leg and outpaced Frenchwoman Julie Derron to also win a silver medal for her country in that event.

Competing at the 2024 Olympic Games in Paris, France, in August 2024 as a member of the German triathlon mixed relay team alongside Lasse Lührs, Lisa Tertsch, and Tim Hellwig, she won the gold medal ahead of the USA and Great Britain teams. It was the country's first Olympic medal in triathlon for 16 years.

In February 2025, she finished in third place behind her compatriots Lisa Tertsch and Nina Eim at World Triathlon's first sprint distance series race in Abu Dhabi.
