= Triathlon at the 2022 Commonwealth Games – Men's =

Men's triathlon at the 2022 Commonwealth Games
- Venue: Sutton Park, Birmingham, United Kingdom
- Date: 29 July 2022
- Competitors: 46 from 29 nations
- Winning time: 50:34

Medalists
gold medal	Alex Yee	England
silver medal	Hayden Wilde	New Zealand
bronze medal	Matt Hauser	Australia

The men's triathlon is part of the Triathlon at the 2022 Commonwealth Games program. The competition was held on 29 July 2022 at Sutton Park, Birmingham.

== Schedule ==
All times are British Summer Time (UTC+1)

Date	Time	Round
Friday 29 July 2022	11:01	Race

== Competition format ==
The race will once again be held over the "sprint distance" and consisted of swimming, road bicycling, and road running.

=== Pre-race ===
Triathlon is traditionally a strong event in the Commonwealth, and the startlist reflected that strength. Olympic silver and bronze medalists Alex Yee of England and Hayden Wilde of New Zealand enter as pre-race favourites, while reigning Commonwealth Games champion Henri Schoeman from South Africa, and 2018 silver medalist Jacob Birtwhistle of Australia also return.

=== Result ===
Rank	Bib	Nation	Triathlete	Swim	T1	Bike	T2	Run	Total	Gap
1st place, gold medalist(s)	2	England	Alex Yee	8:49	0:50	26:07	0:17	14:31	50:34	
2nd place, silver medalist(s)	1	New Zealand	Hayden Wilde	8:38	0:51	26:01	0:18	14:59	50:47	+0:13
3rd place, bronze medalist(s)	5	Australia	Matthew Hauser	8:41	0:56	26:10	0:17	14:46	50:50	+0:16
4	3	Australia	Jacob Birtwhistle	8:51	0:49	26:08	0:18	15:00	51:06	+0:32
5	12	Scotland	Grant Sheldon	8:41	0:52	26:16	0:20	15:15	51:24	+0:50
6	11	South Africa	Jamie Riddle	8:36	0:51	26:04	0:18	15:43	51:32	+0:58
7	15	New Zealand	Dylan McCullough	8:44	0:51	26:15	0:19	15:26	51:35	+1:01
8	4	New Zealand	Tayler Reid	8:34	0:57	25:59	0:18	15:57	51:45	+1:11
9	18	Wales	Iestyn Harrett	8:49	0:52	26:08	0:21	15:41	51:51	+1:17
10	7	Canada	Charles Paquet	8:44	0:58	26:07	0:22	15:47	51:58	+1:24
11	16	Canada	Martin Sobey	8:45	0:52	26:09	0:16	15:56	51:58	+1:24
12	9	England	Daniel Dixon	8:39	0:56	26:14	0:19	15:54	52:02	+1:28
13	20	Bermuda	Tyler Smith	8:53	0:54	26:00	0:23	16:04	52:14	+1:40
14	22	Scotland	Cameron Main	8:40	0:54	26:14	0:19	16:12	52:19	+1:45
15	24	Jersey	Oliver Turner	8:41	0:52	26:17	0:16	16:38	52:44	+2:10
16	19	Northern Ireland	James Edgar	8:42	0:51	26:18	0:19	16:50	53:00	+2:26
17	23	Barbados	Matthew Wright	8:52	0:51	26:05	0:22	17:11	53:21	+2:47
18	21	Wales	Dominic Coy	8:57	0:51	27:41	0:19	15:35	53:23	+2:49
19	10	England	Samuel Dickinson	8:46	0:59	26:04	0:19	17:32	53:40	+3:06
20	43	Isle of Man	Niall Caley	8:56	0:55	27:36	0:20	16:13	54:00	+3:26
21	17	South Africa	Dylan Nortje	8:59	0:54	27:36	0:21	16:22	54:12	+3:38
22	8	Australia	Brandon Copeland	8:54	0:53	27:40	0:17	16:36	54:20	+3:46
23	31	Guernsey	Joshua Lewis	8:47	0:57	27:44	0:22	17:23	55:13	+4:39
24	48	Isle of Man	William Draper	9:49	0:53	28:07	0:18	16:50	55:57	+5:23
25	26	Namibia	Divan du Plooy	9:53	1:03	29:17	0:22	15:49	56:24	+5:50
26	27	Mauritius	Jean Gael Laurent L'Entete	9:42	1:01	28:08	0:25	18:48	58:04	+7:30
27	29	Gibraltar	Andrew Gordon	9:54	0:55	29:22	0:20	17:33	58:04	+7:30
28	42	Cyprus	Panayiotis Antoniou	9:57	1:01	29:13	0:22	17:53	58:26	+7:52
29	38	Gibraltar	Kelvin Gomez	10:49	1:02	30:14	0:28	17:29	1:00:02	+9:28
30	30	India	Adarsh Muralidharan Nair Sinimol	9:51	1:02	31:14	0:27	18:04	1:00:38	+10:04
31	39	Malta	Keith Gales	10:37	1:11	30:19	0:28	19:05	1:01:40	+11:06
32	44	Trinidad and Tobago	Jason Costelloe	12:39	1:11	29:48	0:23	18:05	1:02:06	+11:32
33	47	India	Vishwanath Yadav	10:55	01:05	32:24:00	00:22	18:06	1:02:52	+12:18
34	45	Malaysia	Isaac Tan	09:48	01:21	33:02:00	00:24	18:23	1:02:58	+12:24
35	25	Kenya	Joseph Okal	11:07	01:30	31:48:00	00:34	19:00	1:03:59	+13:25
36	32	Gibraltar	Robert Matto	11:47	01:06	31:32:00	00:30	19:36	1:04:31	+13:57
37	37	Jamaica	Phillip McCatty	12:35	01:12	32:53:00	00:25	19:38	1:06:43	+16:09
38	28	Bahamas	Armando Moss	11:10	01:22	32:34:00	00:37	21:43	1:07:26	+16:52
39	41	Ghana	Mark Ofosu	12:35	01:01	34:29:00	00:30	20:56	1:09:31	+18:57
40	46	Fiji	Nikotimasi Croker	11:06	01:13	36:04:00	00:30	22:17	1:11:10	+20:36
41	33	Fiji	Rhys Cheer	09:56	01:13	33:36:00	00:24	26:41:00	(PF) 1:11:50	+21:16
42	36	Mozambique	Duncan Neville Wyness	13:04	01:35	34:54:00	00:27	21:50	(PF) 1:11:50	+21:16
43	35	Belize	Kian Trejo	13:14	01:29	37:18:00	01:31	22:46	1:16:18	+25:44
44	34	Solomon Islands	Timson Jude Irowane	14:21	01:31	37:20:00	00:23	24:23	1:17:58	+27:24
DNF	6	Canada	Tyler Mislawchuk	8:51	0:51					
DNS	14	South Africa	Henri Schoeman							
