= Triathlon at the 2022 Commonwealth Games – Mixed relay =

Mixed relay Triathlon at the 2022 Commonwealth Games
- Venue: Sutton Park, West Midlands
- Date: 31 July 2022
- Competitors: 48 from 12 nations

Medalists
gold medal	Alex Yee; Sophie Coldwell; Sam Dickinson; Georgia Taylor-Brown	England
silver medal	Iestyn Harrett; Olivia Mathias; Dominic Coy; Non Stanford	Wales
bronze medal	Jacob Birtwhistle; Natalie van Coevorden; Matthew Hauser; Sophie Linn	Australia

The mixed relay triathlon was part of the Triathlon at the 2022 Commonwealth Games program. The competition was held on 31 July 2022 at Sutton Park, near Sutton Coldfield in Birmingham. This was to be the third time the event had been held at the Commonwealth Games.

Australia returned as defending champions, while England, the 2014 champions, returned as hosts. 12 teams competed, the largest number ever in the event, with debuts for Namibia, Trinidad and Tobago and Barbados, the first Caribbean nations to take part, and India, the first Asian team to take part in the event. As such, this was the first occasion when all six regions of the Commonwealth Games Federation will be represented.

== Competition format ==
Each team consisted of four athletes (two male and two female) and each had to cover a course of 300 metres (0.19 mi) swimming, 5 kilometres (3.1 mi) road bicycling, and 2 kilometres (1.2 mi) road running. In line with World Triathlon rules for this Olympiad, for the first time the race order at the Commonwealth Games was male, female, male, female.

== Result ==
Entry lists were published on 20 July 2022.

England regained the title they won in the 2014 Commonwealth Games, individual gold medalist Alex Yee creating a twenty second lead over the run stage of the first leg, and Coldwell, Dickinson and a dominant Taylor-Brown never relinquishing it. Non Stanford, building on the strong leg of Olivia Mathias, surged on the final run leg to give Wales its first Commonwealth triathlon medal, a silver 46 seconds behind the gold, with 2018 champions Australia profiting from a fast third leg from Matthew Hauser to hold on to the bronze medal a further three seconds back, but eight clear of fourth placed New Zealand.

The number in brackets indicates individual rankings on their respective leg.

Rank	Team	Triathletes	Individual Time	Total time	Gap
1st place, gold medalist(s)	England	Alex Yee; Sophie Coldwell; Sam Dickinson; Georgia Taylor-Brown	17:27 (1); 20:18 (4); 18:45 (4); 20:10 (1)	01:16:40	-
2nd place, silver medalist(s)	Wales	Iestyn Harrett; Olivia Mathias; Dominic Coy; Non Stanford	18:10 (5); 20:02 (2); 18:34 (3); 20:40 (2)	01:17:26	+46
3rd place, bronze medalist(s)	Australia	Jacob Birtwhistle; Natalie van Coevorden; Matthew Hauser; Sophie Linn	17:52 (3); 20:47 (6); 18:07 (1); 20:43 (3)	01:17:29	+49
4	New Zealand	Hayden Wilde; Nicole van der Kaay; Tayler Reid; Ainsley Thorpe	17:47 (2); 20:26 (5); 18:33 (2); 20:51 (4)	01:17:37	+57
5	Scotland	Cameron Main; Sophia Green; Grant Sheldon; Beth Potter	18:13 (6); 19:59 (1); 19:19 (6); 21:04 (5)	01:18:35	+1:55
6	Canada	Tyler Mislawchuk; Emy Legault; Charles Paquet; Dominika Jamnicky	18:31 (8); 20:56 (7); 19:01 (5); 21:33 (7)	01:20:01	+3:21
7	Bermuda	Tyler Smith; Flora Duffy; Tyler Butterfield; Erica Hawley	18:38 (9); 20:11 (3); 19:56 (8); 21:21 (6)	01:20:06	+3:26
8	South Africa	Jamie Riddle; Simone Ackerman; Henri Schoeman; Shanae Williams	18:10 (4); 21:41 (8); 19.20 (7); 22:06 (8)	01:21:17	+4:35
9	Namibia	Drikus Coetzee; Imke Jagau; Jean-Paul Burger; Anri Krugel	20:44 (11); 24:02 (9); 20:57 (9); 24:41 (10)	01:30:24	+13:44
10	India	Adarsh Muralidharan Nair Sinimol; Pragnya Mohan; Vishwanath Yadav; Sanjana Sunil Joshi	20:31 (10); 24:09 (10); 22:11 (10); 24:52 (11)	01:31:43	+15:03
11	Trinidad and Tobago	Jean-Marc Granderson; Kaya Rankine-Beadle; Jason Costelloe; Jenna Ross	22:32 (12); 26:03 (11); 22:50 (11); 24:16 (9)	01:35:41	+19:01
12	Barbados	Matthew Wright; Zahra Gaskin; Niel Skinner; Chara Hinds	18:22 (7); 27:25 (12); 23:29 (12); 27:04 (12)	01:36:20	+19:40
