= Triathlon at the 2018 Commonwealth Games – Mixed relay =

Mixed relay Triathlon at the 2018 Commonwealth Games
- Venue: Southport Broadwater Parklands
- Date: 7 April 2018
- Competitors: 32 from 8 nations

Medalists
gold medal	Gillian Backhouse; Matthew Hauser; Ashleigh Gentle; Jacob Birtwhistle	Australia
silver medal	Vicky Holland; Jonathan Brownlee; Jessica Learmonth; Alistair Brownlee	England
bronze medal	Nicole van der Kaay; Ryan Sissons; Andrea Hewitt; Tayler Reid	New Zealand

The mixed relay triathlon was part of the Triathlon at the 2018 Commonwealth Games program. The competition was held on 7 April 2018 in the Southport Broadwater Parklands.

== Schedule ==
All times are Australian Eastern Standard Time (UTC+10)

Date	Time	Round
Saturday 7 April 2018	13:01	Race

== Competition format ==
Each team consisted of four athletes (two male and two female) and each had to cover a course of 250 metres (0.16 mi) swimming, 7 kilometres (4.3 mi) road bicycling, and 1.5 kilometres (0.93 mi) road running.

== Results ==
Rank	Team	Triathletes	Individual Time	Total time
1st place, gold medalist(s)	Australia	Gillian Backhouse; Matthew Hauser; Ashleigh Gentle; Jacob Birtwhistle	19:56; 18:15; 20:28; 18:57	1:17:36
2nd place, silver medalist(s)	England	Vicky Holland; Jonathan Brownlee; Jessica Learmonth; Alistair Brownlee	19:51; 18:20; 21:07; 19:10	1:18:28
3rd place, bronze medalist(s)	New Zealand	Nicole van der Kaay; Ryan Sissons; Andrea Hewitt; Tayler Reid	20:14; 18:53; 21:11; 19:10	1:19:28
4	Canada	Joanna Brown; Tyler Mislawchuk; Desirae Ridenour; Matthew Sharpe	20:26; 18:52; 21:05; 19:12	1:19:35
5	Bermuda	Erica Hawley; Tyler Smith; Flora Duffy; Tyler Butterfield	21:07; 19:56; 20:12; 19:29	1:20:44
6	Wales	Non Stanford; Iestyn Harrett; Olivia Mathias; Christopher Silver	20:14; 19:04; 21:56; 19:38	1:20:52
7	Scotland	Beth Potter; Marc Austin; Erin Wallace; Grant Sheldon	20:59; 19:05; 22:02; 20:15	1:22:21
8	South Africa	Simone Ackermann; Henri Schoeman; Gillian Sanders; Richard Murray	23:21; 18:56; 22:08; 19:09	1:23:34
