= Triathlon at the 2018 Commonwealth Games – Men's =

Men's triathlon at the 2018 Commonwealth Games
- Venue: Southport Broadwater Parklands
- Date: 5 April 2018
- Competitors: 37 from 20 nations
- Winning time: 52:31

Medalists
gold medal	Henri Schoeman	South Africa
silver medal	Jacob Birtwhistle	Australia
bronze medal	Marc Austin	Scotland

The men's triathlon was part of the Triathlon at the 2018 Commonwealth Games program. The competition was held on 5 April 2018 in the Southport Broadwater Parklands.

== Schedule ==
All times are Australian Eastern Standard Time (UTC+10)

Date	Time	Round
Thursday 5 April 2018	13:01	Race

== Competition format ==
The race was held over the "sprint distance" and consisted of swimming, road bicycling, and road running.

== Results ==
Rank	#	Triathlete	Swimming	Cycling	Running	Total time	Difference
1st place, gold medalist(s)	3	Henri Schoeman (RSA)	8:51	27:45	15:00	52:31	—
2nd place, silver medalist(s)	5	Jacob Birtwhistle (AUS)	9:10	27:53	14:36	52:38	+0:07
3rd place, bronze medalist(s)	14	Marc Austin (SCO)	8:53	27:39	15:12	52:44	+0.13
4	16	Matthew Hauser (AUS)	8:52	27:41	15:15	52:46	+0:15
5	4	Ryan Sissons (NZL)	9:01	27:57	14:50	52:49	+0:18
6	2	Richard Murray (RSA)	9:12	27:51	15:01	53:04	+0:33
7	1	Jonny Brownlee (ENG)	8:51	27:41	15:38	53:09	+0:38
8	7	Luke Willian (AUS)	9:05	27:56	15:30	53:33	+1:02
9	8	Matthew Sharpe (CAN)	9:07	27:53	15:36	53:34	+1:03
10	11	Alistair Brownlee (ENG)	8:48	27:44	16:05	53:37	+1:06
11	18	Tayler Reid (NZL)	8:49	27:45	16:17	53:48	+1:17
12	9	Tyler Mislawchuk (CAN)	8:59	28:03	15:55	54:00	+1:29
13	20	Alexis Lepage (CAN)	9:00	28:03	15:55	54:00	+1:29
14	15	Russell White (NIR)	9:10	27:48	16:39	54:38	+2:07
15	19	Jean-Paul Burger (NAM)	9:19	28:35	16:23	55:18	+2:47
16	12	Tony Dodds (NZL)	8:57	28:04	17:28	55:29	+2:58
17	17	Grant Sheldon (SCO)	9:09	29:19	16:0	55:42	+3:11
18	38	Tyler Butterfield (BER)	9:32	28:55	16:13	55:51	+3:20
19	6	Thomas Bishop (ENG)	8:59	29:19	16:49	56:15	+3:44
20	10	Wian Sullwald (RSA)	9:03	27:58	18:26	56:30	+3:59
21	23	Tyler Smith (BER)	9:07	29:22	17:08	56:41	+4:10
22	26	James Edgar (NIR)	9:00	30:54	17:06	58:01	+5:30
23	22	Jason Wilson (BAR)	9:13	31:12	16:48	58:14	+5:43
24	27	Joshua Lewis (GUE)	9:31	30:29	17:30	58:45	+6:14
25	21	Matthew Wright (BAR)	10:12	30:48	16:41	58:46	+6:15
26	34	Oliver Turner (JER)	9:20	31:02	18:40	1:00:06	+7:35
27	24	Timothee Hugnin (MRI)	10:09	30:48	18:20	1:00:24	+7:53
28	33	Andrew Gordon (GIB)	10:10	30:51	18:52	1:00:24	+7:53
29	29	Christopher Walker (GIB)	10:33	31:27	18:52	1:02:00	+9:29
30	28	Xian Hao Chong (MAS)	10:42	33:21	19:29	1:04:45	+12:14
31	25	Robert Matto (GIB)	11:23	33:06	20:01	1:05:47	+13:16
32	32	Phillip McCatty (JAM)	13:56	33:43	20:24	1:09:19	+16:48
33	30	Cameron Roach (BAH)	11:19	35:35	23:13	1:11:31	+19:00
34	36	Patrick Newman (SOL)	13:57	36:24	22:38	1:14:37	+22:06
35	35	Rocky Donald Ratu (SOL)	16:30	36:29	20:45	1:14:59	+22:28
36	37	Brandon Santos (BIZ)	13:51	36:30	23:55	1:15:50	+23:19
