= Matthew Hauser =

Australian triathlete (born 1998)

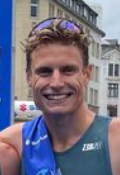

Personal information
- Born: 3 April 1998 (age 28) Maryborough, Australia

Sport
- Country: Australia
- Sport: Triathlon
Medal record
Men's triathlon
Representing Australia
World Championships
| Gold medal – first place | 2025 Wollongong | Individual |
| Gold medal – first place | 2025 Hamburg | Mixed relay |
Oceania Championships
| Gold medal – first place | 2025 Mooloolaba | Sprint |
Commonwealth Games
| Gold medal – first place | 2018 Gold Coast | Mixed relay |
| Bronze medal – third place | 2022 Birmingham | Individual |
| Bronze medal – third place | 2022 Birmingham | Mixed relay |
Super League Triathlon
| Silver medal – second place | 2022 | Championship Series |
| Gold medal – first place | 2022 Munich | Enduro |
| Silver medal – second place | 2022 London | Triple Mix |
| Silver medal – second place | 2022 Neom | Enduro |

Matthew Hauser (born 3 April 1998) is an Australian triathlete. In 2025 Hauser achieved the rare double of world champion and world mixed relay champion.

In July 2025, he was a member of the Australian team which won the gold medal at the World Triathlon Mixed Relay Championships in Hamburg, alongside Sophie Linn, Luke Willian and Emma Jeffcoat. In October of the same year, his home victory in the World Triathlon Championship Series Grand Final in Wollongong, New South Wales confirmed his first individual world title. In 2018, he won the gold medal in the mixed relay event at the Commonwealth Games held in Gold Coast, Australia.

Hauser also competes in Super League Triathlon racing in which he was 2022 Enduro champion.

== Early career ==
In 2018, he won the gold medal in the mixed relay event at the Commonwealth Games held in Gold Coast, Australia. He also finished in 4th place in the men's triathlon. He won a bronze medal in the men's triathlon at the 2022 Commonwealth Games.

In 2021, he competed in the men's triathlon at the 2020 Summer Olympics held in Tokyo, Japan. He also competed in the mixed relay event.

== 2022 season ==
Hauser competed at the 2022 Birmingham Commonwealth Games where he finished third in the individual event and was also part of the bronze medal winning mixed relay team, alongside Sophie Linn, Jacob Birtwistle and Natalie Van Coevorden.

At Super League Triathlon London 2022 Hauser was wrongly identified as Jamie Riddle and penalised for false starting, resulting in a time penalty. However, he was able to recover from the penalty and finish the event in 2nd place. At SLT Munich, the following week, Hauser took first place ahead of Hayden Wilde, and Vasco Vilaca, putting him in first place in the overall Championship standings heading into the 3rd event. After crashes in Malibu and Toulouse saw Hauser drop out of the top spot, he was able to take the win at the series finale in NEOM and secure second place and the silver medal in the series overall.

== Track record ==
The table shows the most significant results (podium finishes) achieved on the international triathlon circuit since 2016 · .

Individual Track Record
| Year | Competition | Country | Result | Time |
|---|---|---|---|---|
| 2025 | World Championship - Classement général | | 1st place, gold medalist(s) | 4250 points |
| 2025 | WTCS Wollongong | Australia | 1st place, gold medalist(s) | 01:42:42 |
| 2025 | WTCS Fréjus – Saint-Raphael | France | 1st place, gold medalist(s) | 00:50:53 |
| 2025 | WTCS Hamburg | Germany | 2nd place, silver medalist(s) | 00:50:07 |
| 2025 | WTCS Yokohama | Japan | 2nd place, silver medalist(s) | 01:41:07 |
| 2025 | WTCS Alghero | Italy | 3rd place, bronze medalist(s) | 01:55:55 |
| 2025 | WTCS Abu Dhabi | United Arab Emirates | 3rd place, bronze medalist(s) | 00:48:23 |
| 2024 | Grand Prix de Triathlon – Stage Metz | France | 1st place, gold medalist(s) | 00:54:03 |
| 2024 | WTCS Hamburg | Germany | 1st place, gold medalist(s) | 00:50:03 |
| 2024 | WTCS Yokohama | Japan | 2nd place, silver medalist(s) | 01:42:12 |
| 2024 | Oceania Triathlon Championships | New Zealand | 1st place, gold medalist(s) | 01:47:20 |
| 2023 | WTCS Montreal | Canada | 1st place, gold medalist(s) | 00:53:47 |
| 2023 | WTCS Yokohama | Japan | 2nd place, silver medalist(s) | 01:42:17 |
| 2023 | Grand Prix de Triathlon – Stage Metz | France | 1st place, gold medalist(s) | 00:51:49 |
| 2022 | Grand Prix de Triathlon – Stage Quiberon | France | 1st place, gold medalist(s) | 00:53:09 |
| 2022 | Commonwealth Games – Birmingham | Australia | 3rd place, bronze medalist(s) | 00:50:50 |
| 2022 | WTCS Hamburg | Germany | 2nd place, silver medalist(s) | 00:53:13 |
| 2022 | Oceania Cup – Sprint Stage Gold Coast | Australia | 1st place, gold medalist(s) | 00:52:57 |
| 2021 | Oceania Cup – Sprint Stage Devonport | Australia | 1st place, gold medalist(s) | 00:53:34 |
| 2019 | Triathlon World Cup – Stage Nur-Sultan | Kazakhstan | 1st place, gold medalist(s) | 01:43:51 |
| 2019 | Triathlon World Cup – Super-sprint Stage Chengdu | China | 1st place, gold medalist(s) | 00:27:42 |
| 2018 | Triathlon World Cup – Stage Mooloolaba | Australia | 2nd place, silver medalist(s) | 00:53:13 |
| 2017 | Triathlon World Cup – Super-sprint Stage Chengdu | China | 1st place, gold medalist(s) | 00:26:46 |
| 2016 | Oceania Cup – Stage Osaka | Japan | 1st place, gold medalist(s) | 00:56:52 |

Mixed Relay Results
| Year | Competition | Country | Position | Time |
|---|---|---|---|---|
| 2025 | 2025 World Mixed Relay Championships | Germany | 1st place, gold medalist(s) | 01:16:52 |
| 2022 | Commonwealth Games – Birmingham | Australia | 3rd place, bronze medalist(s) | 01:17:29 |
| 2022 | WTS Hamburg | Germany | 2nd place, silver medalist(s) | 01:21:03 |
| 2018 | Commonwealth Games – Gold Coast | Australia | 3rd place, bronze medalist(s) | 01:17:29 |
| 2017 | 2017 World Mixed Relay Championships – Hamburg | Australia | 1st place, gold medalist(s) | 01:22:38 |

Wins in Super League
| Year | Wins | Stages |
|---|---|---|
| 2022 | 2 | Neom, Munich and (silver) in overall ranking |
| Total | 2 | |
