= Triathlon at the 2018 Commonwealth Games =

- Venue: Southport Broadwater Parklands
- Dates: 5–7 April 2018
- Competitors: 77 from 24 nations

Triathlon at the 2018 Commonwealth Games was held in the Southport Broadwater Parklands, Gold Coast from April 5 to 7. A total of five events took place, two each for men and women and a mixed relay event. For the first time ever, para-triathlon events were contested at the Commonwealth Games.

== Medal table ==
* Host nation (Australia)

Rank	Nation	Gold	Silver	Bronze	Total
1	England	2	2	0	4
2	Australia*	1	3	2	6
3	Bermuda	1	0	0	1
3	South Africa	1	0	0	1
5	Canada	0	0	1	1
5	New Zealand	0	0	1	1
5	Scotland	0	0	1	1
Totals (7 entries)		5	5	5	15

== Medallists ==
Event	Gold	Silver	Bronze
Men's	Henri Schoeman; South Africa	Jacob Birtwhistle; Australia	Marc Austin; Scotland
Women's	Flora Duffy; Bermuda	Jessica Learmonth; England	Joanna Brown; Canada
Mixed relay	Australia; Gillian Backhouse; Matthew Hauser; Ashleigh Gentle; Jacob Birtwhistle	England; Vicky Holland; Jonny Brownlee; Jessica Learmonth; Alistair Brownlee	New Zealand; Nicole van der Kaay; Ryan Sissons; Andrea Hewitt; Tayler Reid

Para-triathlon

Event	Gold	Silver	Bronze
Men's PTWC	Joe Townsend; England	Nic Beveridge; Australia	Bill Chaffey; Australia
Women's PTWC	Jade Jones; England	Emily Tapp; Australia	Lauren Parker; Australia

== Participating nations ==
There are 24 participating nations in triathlon with a total of 77 athletes.

- Australia (12 athletes)
- Bahamas (1)
- Barbados (2)
- Belize (1)
- Bermuda (4)
- Canada (6)
- England (10)
- Gibraltar (3)
- Guernsey (1)
- Isle of Man (1)
- Jamaica (2)
- Jersey (1)
- Kenya (2)
- Malaysia (2)
- Mauritius (1)
- Namibia (1)
- New Zealand (6)
- Northern Ireland (3)
- Papua New Guinea (1)
- Scotland (5)
- Solomon Islands (2)
- South Africa (5)
- Trinidad and Tobago (1)
- Wales (4)
