= Alice Betto =

Italian triathlete (born 1987)

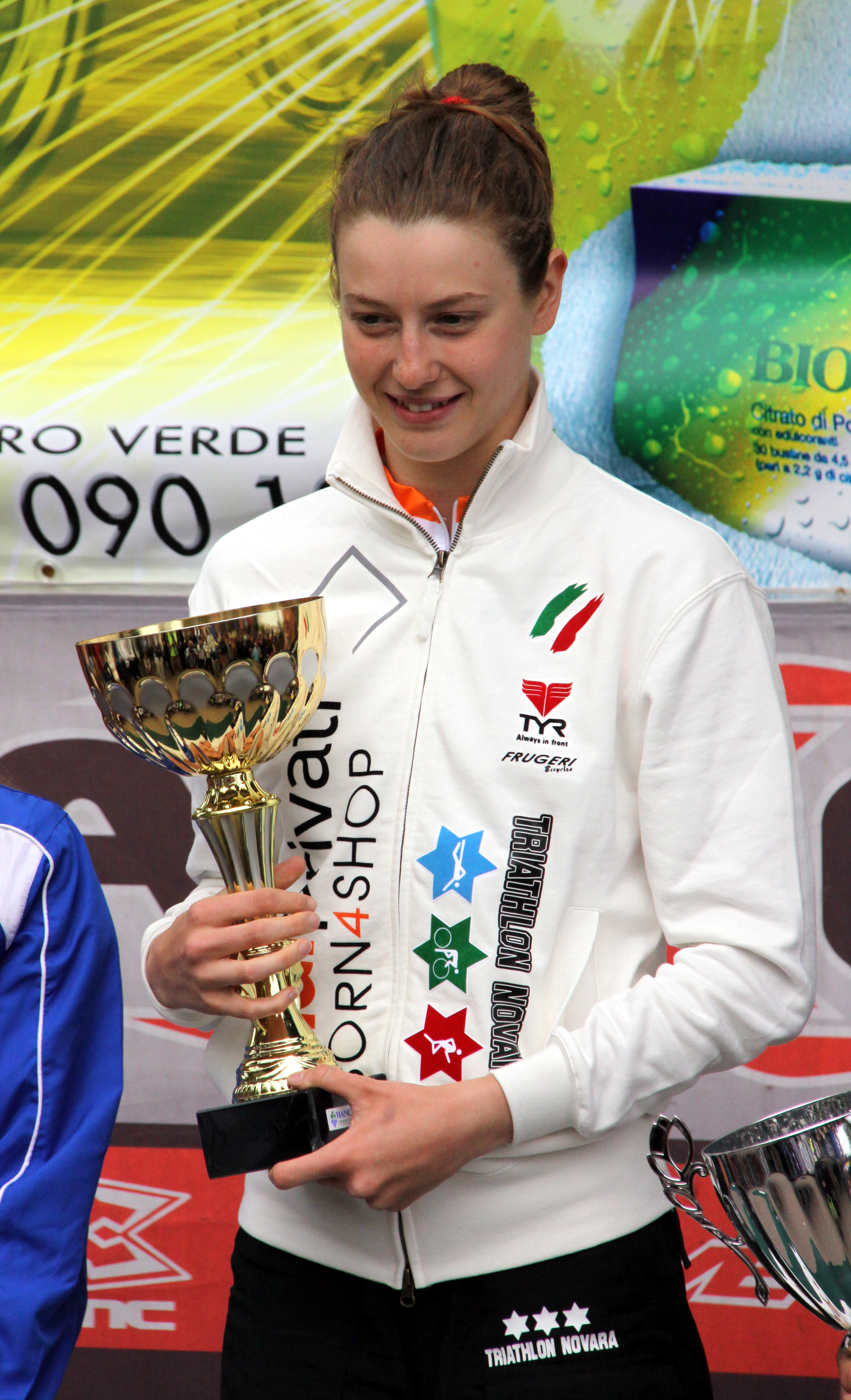
- Alice Betto, the winner of the Triathlon di Andora, 2010.

Personal information
- Nationality: Italian
- Born: 10 December 1987 (age 38) Cavaria, Italy
- Height: 1.70 m (5 ft 7 in)
- Weight: 56 kg (123 lb)

Sport
- Sport: Triathlon
- Club: Fiamme Oro
Medal record
Women's triathlon
Representing Italy
European Championships
Bronze medal – third place	2024 Vichy	Women's

Alice Betto (born 10 December 1987) is an Italian professional triathlete, National 2010 Elite Champion and National 2009 U23 Champion.

== Career ==
At her international debut, i.e. the first European Cup of the year 2010 in Quarteira, she won the bronze medal and proved to be a match for superstars like Quarteira winner Vanessa Fernandes, who had won the silver medal at the Olympic Games in Beijing, and Quarteira silver medalist Emmie Charayron, the 2009 Junior World Champion.

In Italy, Alice Betto represented the club Triathlon Novara and CUS Pro Patria Milano, although the latter did not mention her among its athletes. In 2011 and 2012, Alice Betto represents DDS Settimo Milanese. In 2010 Alice Betto also took part in the prestigious French Club Championship Series Lyonnaise des Eaux, representing TCG 79 Parthenay. At the opening triathlon in Dunkirk (23 May 2010), i.e. the only triathlon of this circuit Betto attended, she placed 15th among the international elite triathletes and turned out to be the second best runner of her club. Alice Betto studies restauro at the Accademia di Belle Arti di Brera in Milan.

In 2021, she competed in the women's event at the 2020 Summer Olympics in Tokyo, Japan. She also competed in the mixed relay event. She competed in the women's triathlon at the 2024 Summer Olympics in Paris, France.

in 2023, Betto caused a crash involving her New Zealand teammate, Nicole van der Kaay, after leaning into her and pushing her bike into the nearby barrier during a Super League Triathlon event in Toulouse, facing backlash online as a result. Both Betto and Kay claimed it was an accident.

== ITU Competitions ==
In 2010 Betto took part in four ITU competitions and achieved four top ten positions. The following list is based upon the official ITU rankings and the Athlete's Profile Page. Unless indicated otherwise, the following events are triathlons (Olympic Distance) and belong to the Elite category.

Date	Competition	Place	Rank
2010-04-11	European Cup	Quarteira	3
2010-08-15	European Cup	Geneva	3
2010-09-08	Dextro Energy World Championship Series: Grand Final (U23 World Championship)	Budapest	7
2010-10-24	Premium European Cup	Alanya	8
