= Ainsley Thorpe =

New Zealand triathlete (born 1998)

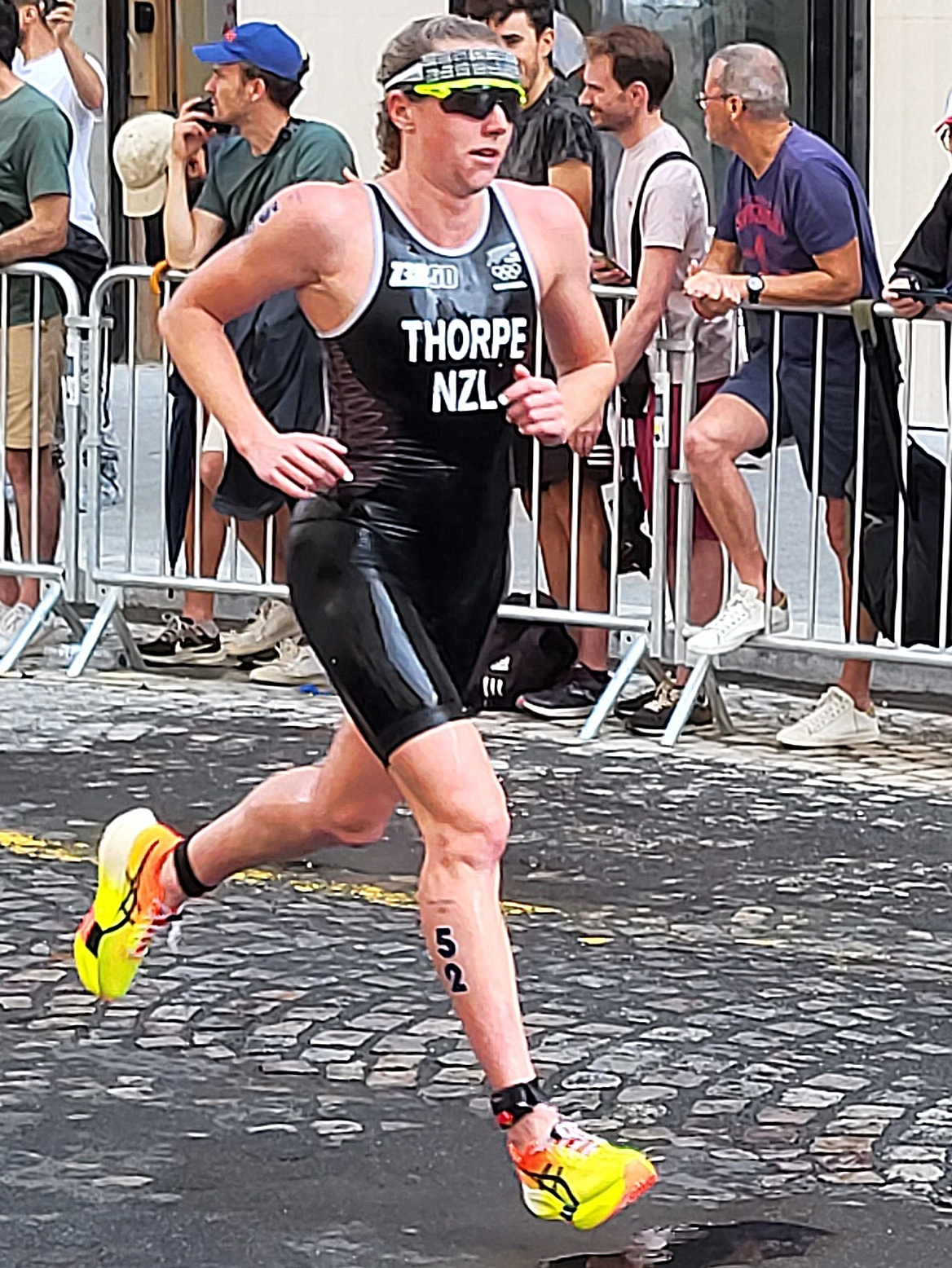

Personal information
- Born: 13 February 1998 (age 28) Auckland, New Zealand
- Height: 1.59 m (5 ft 3 in)
- Weight: 52 kg (115 lb)

Sport
- Country: New Zealand
- Sport: Triathlon
Medal record
Women's triathlon
Representing New Zealand
World Championships
Bronze medal – third place	2024 Hambrg	Mixed relay

Ainsley Thorpe (born 13 February 1998) is a New Zealand professional triathlete. She competed in the women's triathlon at the 2024 Summer Olympics in Paris, France.

Thorpe began participating in triathlons as a 16-year-old. She has competed in the World Triathlon Series since 2018, with a best result of third in the 2019 sprint event in Antwerp. She also competes in the World Triathlon mixed relay series, winning the relay at the Edmonton leg of the series in 2019. She represented her country at the 2020 Summer Olympics, but did not finish the women's triathlon after crashing on the cycle leg. She also competed in the mixed relay alongside Tayler Reid, Hayden Wilde, and Nicole van der Kaay.

Thorpe was listed to compete in the women's trialthlon at the 2022 Commonwealth Games in Birmingham, England, but did not start the event due to COVID-19.
