= 2016 in triathlon =

This topic reveals a large number of triathlon events and their results for 2016.

== 2016 Summer Olympics (ITU) ==
- August 18 – 20: 2016 Summer Olympics in (Brazil) Rio de Janeiro at Fort Copacabana
  - Men's Elite winner: (gold) (United Kingdom) Alistair Brownlee; (silver) (United Kingdom) Jonny Brownlee; (bronze) (South Africa) Henri Schoeman
  - Women's Elite winner: (gold) (United States) Gwen Jorgensen; (silver) (Switzerland) Nicola Spirig; (bronze) (United Kingdom) Vicky Holland

== 2016 ITU World Triathlon Series ==
- March 4 & 5: ITU WTS #1 in (United Arab Emirates) Abu Dhabi
  - Men's Elite winner: (Spain) Mario Mola
  - Women's Elite winner: (United Kingdom) Jodie Stimpson
- April 9 & 10: ITU WTS #2 in (Australia) Gold Coast, Queensland
  - Men's Elite winner: (Spain) Mario Mola
  - Women's Elite winner: (United Kingdom) Helen Jenkins
- April 24: ITU WTS #3 in (South Africa) Cape Town
  - Men's Elite winner: (Spain) Fernando Alarza
  - Women's Elite winner: (United Kingdom) Non Stanford
- May 14 & 15: ITU WTS #4 in (Japan) Yokohama
  - Men's Elite winner: (Spain) Mario Mola
  - Women's Elite winner: (United States) Gwen Jorgensen
- June 11 & 12: ITU WTS #5 in (United Kingdom) Leeds
  - Men's Elite winner: (United Kingdom) Alistair Brownlee
  - Women's Elite winner: (United States) Gwen Jorgensen
- July 2 & 3: ITU WTS #6 in (Sweden) Stockholm
  - Men's Elite winner: (United Kingdom) Alistair Brownlee
  - Women's Elite winner: (Bermuda) Flora Duffy
- July 16 & 17: ITU WTS #7 in (Germany) Hamburg
  - Men's Elite winner: (Spain) Mario Mola
  - Women's Elite winner: (United States) Katie Zaferes
- September 3 & 4: ITU WTS #8 in (Canada) Edmonton
  - Men's Elite winner: (United Kingdom) Jonny Brownlee
  - Women's Elite winner: (United States) Summer Cook
- September 11 – 18: ITU WTS (#9) Grand Final in (Mexico) Cozumel
  - Men's Elite winner: (South Africa) Henri Schoeman
  - Women's Elite winner: (Bermuda) Flora Duffy
  - Junior Men winner: (United States) Austin Hindman
  - Junior Women winner: (United States) Taylor Knibb
  - Men's U23 winner: (Netherlands) Jorik van Egdom
  - Women's U23 winner: (Germany) Laura Lindemann

== 2016 ITU Triathlon World Cup ==
- March 12: ITU TWC #1 in (Australia) Mooloolaba, Queensland
  - Men's Elite winner: (Spain) Mario Mola
  - Women's Elite winner: (United Kingdom) Jodie Stimpson
- April 3: ITU TWC #2 in (New Zealand) New Plymouth
  - Men's Elite winner: (South Africa) Richard Murray
  - Women's Elite winner: (United States) Gwen Jorgensen
- April 16: ITU TWC #3 in (China) Chengdu
  - Men's Elite winner: (Mexico) Rodrigo Gonzalez
  - Women's Elite winner: (United States) Summer Cook
- May 7 & 8: ITU TWC #4 in (Mexico) Huatulco
  - Men's Elite winner: (France) Etienne Diemunsch
  - Women's Elite winner: (Switzerland) Jolanda Annen
- May 8: ITU TWC #5 in (Italy) Cagliari
  - Men's Elite winner: (Norway) Kristian Blummenfelt
  - Women's Elite winner: (United Kingdom) India Lee
- July 9 & 10: ITU TWC #6 in (Hungary) Tiszaújváros
  - Men's Elite winner: (Russia) Dmitry Polyanski
  - Women's Elite winner: (United States) Renee Tomlin
- August 6 & 7: ITU TWC #7 in (Canada) Montreal
  - Men's Elite winner: (Norway) Kristian Blummenfelt
  - Women's Elite winner: (Bermuda) Flora Duffy
- September 25: ITU TWC #8 in Salinas, Ecuador
  - Men's Elite winner: (Spain) David Castro Fajardo
  - Women's Elite winner: (United States) Kirsten Kasper
- October 22: ITU TWC #9 in (South Korea) Tongyeong
  - Men's Elite winner: (Spain) Uxio Abuin Ares
  - Women's Elite winner: (United States) Summer Cook
- October 29: ITU TWC #10 (final) in (Japan) Miyazaki
  - Men's Elite winner: (Spain) Uxio Abuin Ares
  - Women's Elite winner: (Japan) Ai Ueda

== World triathlon championships ==
- February 13 & 14: 2016 Zeltweg ITU Winter Triathlon World Championships in Austria
  - Men's Elite winner: (Russia) Pavel Andreev
  - Women's Elite winner: (Russia) Yulia Surikova
  - Junior Men's winner: (Russia) Anton Matrusov
  - Junior Women's winner: (Austria) Anna Swoboda
  - Men's Under 23 winner: (Russia) Roman Vasin
  - Women's Under 23 winner: (Austria) Sina Hinteregger
- June 4 & 5: 2016 Avilés ITU Duathlon World Championships in Spain
  - Men's Elite winner: (South Africa) Richard Murray
  - Women's Elite winner: (United Kingdom) Emma Pallant
  - Junior Men's winner: (United Kingdom) Alex Yee
  - Junior Women's winner: (Switzerland) Delia Sclabas
  - Men's Under 23 winner: (Netherlands) Jorik van Egdom
  - Women's Under 23 winner: (Spain) Claudia Luna
- July 16 & 17: 2016 Hamburg ITU Triathlon Mixed Relay World Championships in Germany
  - Winners: The United States (Gwen Jorgensen, Ben Kanute, Kirsten Kasper, Joe Maloy)
- July 23 & 24: 2016 Rotterdam ITU Paratriathlon World Championships in the Netherlands
  - Men's PT1 winner: (Netherlands) Jetze Plat
  - Men's PT2 winner: (United Kingdom) Andrew Lewis
  - Men's PT3 winner: (Russia) Denis Kungurtcev
  - Men's PT4 winner: (Germany) Martin Schulz
  - Men's PT5 winner: (United States) Aaron Scheidies
  - Women's PT1 winner: (United States) Kendall Gretsch
  - Women's PT2 winner: (United States) Allysa Seely
  - Women's PT3 winner: (France) Manon Genest
  - Women's PT4 winner: (United States) Grace Norman
  - Women's PT5 winner: (United Kingdom) Alison Patrick
- August 7: 2016 Nyon FISU World University Triathlon Championship in Switzerland
  - Men's Elite winner: (United Kingdom) Grant Sheldon
  - Women's Elite winner: (Japan) Yuko Takahashi
- September 4: 2016 Zofingen ITU Powerman Long Distance Duathlon World Championships in Switzerland
  - Men's Elite winner: (Belgium) Seppe Odeyn
  - Women's Elite winner: (United Kingdom) Emma Pooley
- September 11 – 18: 2016 Cozumel ITU Aquathlon World Championships in Mexico
  - Men's Elite winner: (United Kingdom) Alistair Brownlee
  - Women's Elite winner: (Russia) Mariya Shorets
  - Junior Men's winner: (Poland) Michał Oliwa
  - Junior Women's winner: (Australia) Elle Leahy
  - Men's Under 23 winner: (Turkey) Jonas Schomburg
  - Women's Under 23 winner: (Russia) Anastasia Gorbunova
- September 24: 2016 Oklahoma City ITU Long Distance Triathlon World Championships in the United States
  - Men's Elite winner: (France) Sylvain Sudrie
  - Women's Elite winner: (United Kingdom) Jodie Swallow
- November 19 & 20: 2016 Snowy Mountains ITU Cross Triathlon World Championships in Australia
  - Men's Elite winner: (Spain) Ruben Ruzafa
  - Women's Elite winner: (Bermuda) Flora Duffy
  - Junior Men's winner: (South Africa) Michael Ferreira
  - Junior Women's winner: (Australia) Laura May
  - Men's Under 23 winner: (South Africa) Brad Matthew Edwards
  - Women's Under 23 winner: (Czech Republic) Aneta Grabmullerova

== Regional triathlon championships ==
- January 15 & 17: 2016 La Paz CAMTRI Triathlon American Cup and Junior South American Championships in Argentina
  - Men's Elite winner: (Argentina) Luciano Taccone
  - Women's Elite winner: (Argentina) Romina Palacio Balena
  - Junior Men's winner: (Chile) Javier Martín
  - Junior Women's winner: (Chile) Andrea Garrido
- January 31: 2016 Mérida CAMTRI Triathlon American Cup and Iberoamerican Championships in Mexico
  - Men's Elite winner: (Mexico) Irving Perez
  - Women's Elite winner: (Mexico) Cecilia Gabriela Perez Flores
- February 13 & 14: 2016 Havana CAMTRI Sprint Triathlon American Cup and Iberoamerican Championships in Cuba
  - Men's Elite winner: (Colombia) Carlos Quinchara
  - Women's Elite winner: (Spain) Camila Alonso
- February 13 & 14: 2016 Havana CAMTRI Middle Distance Triathlon Iberoamerican Championships in Cuba
  - Men's Elite winner: (Spain) Gustavo Rodriguez Iglesias
  - Women's Elite winner: (United States) Ellen Hart
- March 12: 2016 Sarasota CAMTRI Triathlon Junior North American Championships in United States
  - Junior Men winner: (Canada) Oliver Blecher
  - Junior Women winner: (Canada) Laurin Thorne
- March 20: 2016 Valparaíso CAMTRI Triathlon American Cup and South American Championships in Chile
  - Men's Elite winner: (Brazil) Anton Ruanova
  - Women's Elite winner: (Argentina) Romina Biagioli
- April 1 & 2: 2016 Sharm el-Sheikh ATU Sprint Triathlon African Cup and Pan Arab Sprint Triathlon Championships in Egypt
  - Men's Elite winner: (Hungary) László Tarnai
  - Women's Elite winner: (Italy) Elena Maria Petrini
  - Junior Men winner: (Bahrain) Abdulla Attiya
  - Junior Women winner: (Egypt) Basmala Elsalamony
- April 8: 2016 Sharm el-Sheikh ATU Duathlon African Championships and Pan Arab Duathlon Championships in Egypt
  - Men's Elite winner: (Bahrain) Moussa Karich
  - Women's Elite winner: (Egypt) Fatma Hagras
  - Junior Men winner: (Egypt) Kamal Atef
  - Junior Women winner: (Iraq) Suzy Soliman (default)
  - Men's U23 winner: (Jordan) Mohammad Jawhar
  - Women's U23 winner: (Egypt) Naira Mohamed
- April 8: 2016 Sharm el-Sheikh ATU Aquathlon African Championships and Pan Arab Aquathlon Championships in Egypt
  - Men's Elite winner: (Egypt) Mohanad Yasser
  - Women's Elite winner: (Egypt) Basmala Elsalamony
  - Junior Men winner: (Palestine) Abdallah Abushabab
  - Junior Women winner: (Jordan) Kareena Othman
  - Men's U23 winner: (Egypt) Mohanad Yasser
  - Women's U23 winner: (Egypt) Basmala Elsalamony
- April 15 – 17: 2016 San Andrés CAMTRI Triathlon Junior Central American and Caribbean Championships in Colombia
  - Junior Men winner: (El Salvador) Bryan Fernando Mendoza Ramos
  - Junior Women winner: (Costa Rica) Raquel Solis Guerrero
- April 16 & 17: 2016 Pokhara ASTC South Asian Triathlon Championships in Nepal
  - Men's Elite winner: (Nepal) Rudra Katuwal
  - Women's Elite winner: (India) Sorojini Devi Thoudam
- June 11: 2016 Olimp ETU Balkan Triathlon Championships in Romania
  - Men's Elite winner: (Serbia) Ognjen Stojanović
  - Women's Elite winner: (Turkey) Ipek Oztosun
- June 25 & 26: 2016 Valga ETU Baltic Triathlon Championships in Estonia
  - Men's Elite winner: (Lithuania) Alberto Eugenio Casillas Garcia
  - Women's Elite winner: (Estonia) Paula-Brit Siimar
- August 27 & 28: 2016 Fredericia ETU Nordic Triathlon Championships in Denmark
  - Men's Elite winner: (Denmark) Andreas Schilling
  - Women's Elite winner: (Sweden) Amanda Bohlin
- November 18: 2016 Aqaba ASTC West Asian Triathlon Championships in Jordan
  - Men's Elite winner: (Slovenia) Domen Dornik
  - Women's Elite winner: (Spain) Zurine Rodriguez

== European Triathlon Union (ETU) ==
- January 23: 2016 Otepää ETU Winter Triathlon European Championships in Estonia
  - Men's Elite winner: (Russia) Pavel Andreev
  - Women's Elite winner: (Russia) Olga Parfinenko
  - Men's Junior winner: (Russia) Anton Matrusov
  - Women's Junior winner: (Estonia) Merili Sirvel
  - Men's U23 winner: (Russia) Roman Vasin
  - Women's U23 winner: (Russia) Iuliia Baiguzova
- April 16 & 17: 2016 Kalkar ETU Duathlon European Championships in Germany
  - Men's Elite winner: (Netherlands) Jorik van Egdom
  - Women's Elite winner: (Italy) Giorgia Priarone
  - Men's Junior winner: (Germany) Moritz Horn
  - Women's Junior winner: (Germany) Lisa Tertsch
  - Men's U23 winner: (Netherlands) Jorik van Egdom
  - Women's U23 winner: (Germany) Sara Baumann
- April 23 & 24: 2016 Târgu Mureș ETU Cross Duathlon European Championships in Romania
  - Men's Elite winner: (Spain) Xavier Jové Riart
  - Women's Elite winner: (Spain) Margarita Fullana Riera
  - Men's Junior winner: (Slovakia) Matus Kozlovsky
  - Women's Junior winner: (Ukraine) Sofiya Pryyma
  - Men's U23 winner: (Spain) Xavier Jové Riart
  - Women's U23 winner: (Latvia) Anastasija Krūmiņa (default)
- May 7 & 8: 2016 Copenhagen ETU Powerman Long Distance Duathlon European Championships in Denmark
  - Men's Elite winner: (Belgium) Kenneth Vandendriessche
  - Women's Elite winner: (Switzerland) Nina Brenn
- May 26 – 29: 2016 Lisbon ETU Triathlon European Championships in Portugal
  - Men's Elite winner: (Spain) Francisco Javier Gómez Noya
  - Women's Elite winner: (United Kingdom) India Lee
  - Men's Junior winner: (Spain) Javier Lluch Perez
  - Women's Junior winner: (France) Cassandre Beaugrand
- June 17 – 19: 2016 Burgas ETU Triathlon U23 European Championships in Bulgaria
  - Men's U23 winner: (Spain) David Castro Fajardo
  - Women's U23 winner: (Italy) Angelica Olmo
- June 25: 2016 Vallée de Joux ETU Cross Triathlon European Championships in Switzerland
  - Men's Elite winner: (Spain) Ruben Ruzafa
  - Women's Elite winner: (Switzerland) Ludivine Dufour
  - Men's Junior winner: (Italy) Filippo Pradella
  - Women's Junior winner: (Italy) Marta Menditto
  - Men's U23 winner: (France) Arthur Serrieres
  - Women's U23 winner: (Austria) Sina Hinteregger
- June 25 & 26: 2016 Châteauroux ETU Aquathlon European Championships in France
  - Men's Elite winner: (Ukraine) Oleksiy Syutkin
  - Women's Elite winner: (Russia) Valentina Zapatrina
  - Men's Junior winner: (France) Alexis Kardes
  - Women's Junior winner: (Czech Republic) Simona Simunkova
  - Men's U23 winner: (Czech Republic) Jiri Kalus
  - Women's U23 winner: (Czech Republic) Tereza Zimovjanova
- June 26: 2016 Châteauroux ETU Sprint Triathlon European Championships in France
  - Men's Elite winner: (France) Vincent Luis
  - Women's Elite winner: (United Kingdom) Lucy Hall
- July 2 – 5: 2016 Tiszaújváros ETU Triathlon Youth European Championships Festival in Hungary
  - Men's Youth winner: (Portugal) Vasco Vilaca
  - Women's Youth winner: (Denmark) Sif Bendix Madsen
  - Youth 4 x Mixed Relay winners: Russia
- July 24: 2016 Poznań ETU Challenge Long Distance Triathlon European Championships in Poland
  - Men's Elite winner: (Slovenia) Denis Sketako
  - Women's Elite winner: (Poland) Ewa Bugdol
- September 3: 2016 Banyoles ETU Triathlon Clubs European Championships in Spain
  - 4 x Mixed Relay winners: France
- September 4: 2016 Walchsee ETU Challenge Middle Distance Triathlon European Championships in Austria
  - Men's Elite winner: (Italy) Giulio Molinari
  - Women's Elite winner: (Germany) Julia Gajer

== Confederación Americana de Triathlon (CAMTRI) ==
- March 12 & 13: 2016 Sarasota CAMTRI Sprint Triathlon and Mixed Relay American Championships in the United States
  - Men's Elite winner: (Canada) Xavier Grenier-Talavera
  - Women's Elite winner: (United States) Kaitlin Donner
  - 4x Mixed Relay winners: United States Team One (Kaitlin Donner, Eric Lagerstrom, Erin Jones, Jarrod Shoemaker)
- March 13: 2016 Sarasota CAMTRI Paratriathlon American Championships in the United States
  - Men's PT1 winner: (United States) Krige Schabort
  - Men's PT2 winner: (United States) Mark Barr
  - Men's PT3 winner: (Brazil) Jorge Luis Fonseca
  - Men's PT4 winner: (United States) Chris Hammer
  - Men's PT5 winner: (United States) Aaron Scheidies
  - Women's PT1 winner: (United States) Kendall Gretsch
  - Women's PT2 winner: (United States) Allysa Seely
  - Women's PT3 winner: (United States) Andrea Walton
  - Women's PT4 winner: (United States) Grace Norman
  - Women's PT5 winner: (United States) Elizabeth Baker
- July 9: 2016 West Des Moines CAMTRI Triathlon U23 & Junior American Championships in the United States
  - Men's Junior winner: (Canada) Charles Paquet
  - Women's Junior winner: (United States) Taylor Knibb
  - Men's U23 winner: (Mexico) Cesar Saracho
  - Women's U23 winner: (Mexico) Vanesa de la Torre
- November 25 – 27: 2016 Buenos Aires CAMTRI Triathlon American Championship in Argentina
  - Men's Elite winner: (Argentina) Luciano Taccone
  - Women's Elite winner: (Brazil) Luisa Baptista

== Oceania Triathlon Union (OTU) ==
- February 20 & 21: 2016 Devonport OTU Paratriathlon Oceania Championships in Australia
  - Note: No Men's PT3 and Women's PT2 events here.
  - Men's PT1 winner: (Australia) Bill Chaffey
  - Men's PT2 winner: (Australia) Brant Garvey
  - Men's PT4 winner: (Australia) Joshua Kassulke
  - Men's PT5 winner: (Australia) Jonathan Goerlach
  - Women's PT1 winner: (Australia) Emily Tapp
  - Women's PT3 winner: (Australia) Sally Pilbeam
  - Women's PT4 winner: (Australia) Kate Doughty
  - Women's PT5 winner: (Australia) Katie Kelly (default)
- March 19 & 20: 2016 Gisborne OTU Triathlon Oceania Championships in New Zealand
  - Men's Elite winner: (Australia) Marcel Walkington
  - Women's Elite winner: (Australia) Emma Moffatt
  - Junior Men: (Australia) Matthew Hauser
  - Junior Women: (Australia) Jessica Claxton
  - Men's U23 winner: (Australia) Marcel Walkington
  - Women's U23 winner: (Australia) Emma Jeffcoat
  - Junior 4x mixed relay winners: Australia Team Four (Zoe Leahy, Kye Wylde, Sophie Malowiecki, Matthew Hauser)
- April 23 & 24: 2016 Penrith OTU Sprint Triathlon Oceania Championships in New Zealand
  - Men's Elite winner: (Australia) Matthew Roberts
  - Women's Elite winner: (Australia) Jaz Hedgeland
  - Men's U23 winner: (Australia) Matthew Roberts
  - Women's U23 winner: (Australia) Jaz Hedgeland

== Asian Triathlon Confederation (ASTC) ==
- April 28 – May 1: 2016 Hatsukaichi ASTC Triathlon Asian Championships in Japan
  - Men's Elite winner: (Japan) Hirokatsu Tayama
  - Women's Elite winner: (Japan) Ai Ueda
  - Men's Junior winner: (Hong Kong) James Tan
  - Women's Junior winner: (South Korea) JEONG Hye-rim
  - Men's U23 winner: (Japan) Ryousuke Maeda
  - Women's U23 winner: (Japan) Hiraku Fukuoka
- April 28 – May 1: 2016 Hatsukaichi ASTC Paratriathlon Asian Championships in Japan
  - Note: No Women's PT1 and PT3 events here.
  - Men's PT1 winner: (Japan) Jumpei Kimura
  - Men's PT2 winner: (Japan) Kenshiro Nakayama
  - Men's PT3 winner: (China) WANG Jiachao
  - Men's PT4 winner: (Japan) Keiichi Sato
  - Men's PT5 winner: (Japan) Ryu Nakazawa
  - Women's PT2 winner: (Japan) Yukako Hata (default)
  - Women's PT4 winner: (Japan) Mami Tani (default)
  - Women's PT5 winner: (Japan) Atsuko Yamada (default)

== Africa Triathlon Union (ATU) ==
- March 12: 2016 Bloemfontein ATU Triathlon Junior African Championships in South Africa
  - Junior Men: (South Africa) Ben de la Porte
  - Junior Women: (South Africa) Maude Elaine le Roux
  - Youth Men: (Zimbabwe) Brett Elliott
- March 12: 2016 Bloemfontein ATU Paratriathlon African Championships in South Africa
  - Note: No Women's PT2 and PT5 events here.
  - Men's PT1 winner: (South Africa) Anton Swanepoel (default)
  - Men's PT2 winner: (Morocco) Mohamed Lahna (default)
  - Men's PT3 winner: (South Africa) Dylan da Silva
  - Men's PT4 winner: (South Africa) Stan Andrews
  - Men's PT5 winner: (South Africa) David Jones (default)
  - Women's PT1 winner: (South Africa) Catherine van Staden (default)
  - Women's PT3 winner: (Netherlands) Saskia van den Ouden (default)
  - Women's PT4 winner: (Hungary) Petra Lévay (default)
- March 20: 2016 Buffalo City ATU Triathlon African Championships in South Africa
  - Men's Elite winner: (South Africa) Henri Schoeman
  - Women's Elite winner: (South Africa) Mari Rabie
  - Men's U23 winner: (South Africa) Wian Sullwald
  - Women's U23 winner: (South Africa) Alexander Quenet

== 2016 World Paratriathlon events ==
- March 19 & 20: WP #1 in (South Africa) Buffalo City
  - Note: No Women's PT1 and PT3 events here.
  - Men's PT1 winner: (Italy) Giovanni Achenza
  - Men's PT2 winner: (United Kingdom) Ryan Taylor
  - Men's PT3 winner: (Brazil) Jorge Luis Fonseca
  - Men's PT4 winner: (France) Yannick Bourseaux
  - Men's PT5 winner: (France) Arnaud Grandjean
  - Women's PT2 winner: (France) Elise Marc
  - Women's PT4 winner: (United Kingdom) Lauren Steadman
  - Women's PT5 winner: (United Kingdom) Alison Patrick
- April 24: WP #2 in (Australia) Penrith, New South Wales
  - Men's PT1 winner: (Australia) Bill Chaffey
  - Men's PT2 winner: (United Kingdom) Andrew Lewis
  - Men's PT3 winner: (Australia) Justin Godfrey
  - Men's PT4 winner: (United Kingdom) George Peasgood
  - Men's PT5 winner: (Australia) Jonathan Goerlach
  - Women's PT1 winner: (Australia) Emily Tapp
  - Women's PT2 winner: (United States) Sarah Reinertsen
  - Women's PT3 winner: (Australia) Kerryn Harvey (default)
  - Women's PT4 winner: (Australia) Kate Doughty
  - Women's PT5 winner: (United States) Elizabeth Baker
- May 14 & 15: WP #3 (Part of the fourth ITU World Triathlon Series event) in (Japan) Yokohama
  - Note: No Women's PT3 event here.
  - Men's PT1 winner: (Australia) Bill Chaffey
  - Men's PT2 winner: (Germany) Stefan Loesler
  - Men's PT3 winner: (Russia) Denis Kungurtcev
  - Men's PT4 winner: (Canada) Stefan Daniel
  - Men's PT5 winner: (Japan) Ryu Nakazawa
  - Women's PT1 winner: (United States) Mary Catherine Callahan (default)
  - Women's PT2 winner: (United States) Allysa Seely
  - Women's PT4 winner: (Australia) Kate Doughty
  - Women's PT5 winner: (United States) Amy Dixon
- May 15: WP #4 in (Spain) Águilas
  - Men's PT1 winner: (Netherlands) Geert Schipper
  - Men's PT2 winner: (Italy) Michele Ferrarin
  - Men's PT3 winner: (Spain) Alejandro Sánchez Palomero
  - Men's PT4 winner: (Germany) Martin Schulz
  - Men's PT5 winner: (Slovenia) Alen Kobilica
  - Women's PT1 winner: (Spain) Eva María Moral Pedrero (default)
  - Women's PT2 winner: (United States) Sarah Reinertsen
  - Women's PT3 winner: (France) Manon Genest
  - Women's PT4 winner: (Canada) Chantal Givens
  - Women's PT5 winner: (United Kingdom) Melissa Reid
- June 5: WP #5 in (United Kingdom) Strathclyde, Scotland
  - Men's PT1 winner: (Netherlands) Jetze Plat
  - Men's PT2 winner: (France) Geoffrey Wersy
  - Men's PT3 winner: (Austria) Oliver Dreier
  - Men's PT4 winner: (United States) Chris Hammer
  - Men's PT5 winner: (Spain) Jose Luis García Serrano
  - Women's PT1 winner: (United Kingdom) Lizzie Tench
  - Women's PT2 winner: (United States) Sarah Reinertsen
  - Women's PT3 winner: (Germany) Nora Hansel (default)
  - Women's PT4 winner: (United Kingdom) Lauren Steadman
  - Women's PT5 winner: (Republic of Ireland) Catherine Walsh
- June 19: WP #6 (final) in (France) Besançon
  - Note: No Women's PT1 event here.
  - Men's PT1 winner: (Netherlands) Geert Schipper
  - Men's PT2 winner: (France) Stéphane Bahier
  - Men's PT3 winner: (Republic of Ireland) Tojo Lazzari
  - Men's PT4 winner: (France) Yannick Bourseaux
  - Men's PT5 winner: (France) Arnaud Grandjean
  - Women's PT2 winner: (France) Elise Marc
  - Women's PT3 winner: (France) Manon Genest
  - Women's PT4 winner: (United Kingdom) Faye Mcclelland
  - Women's PT5 winner: (Republic of Ireland) Catherine Walsh
