= Triathlon at the 2024 Summer Olympics – Women's =

Women's triathlon at the Games of the XXXIII Olympiad
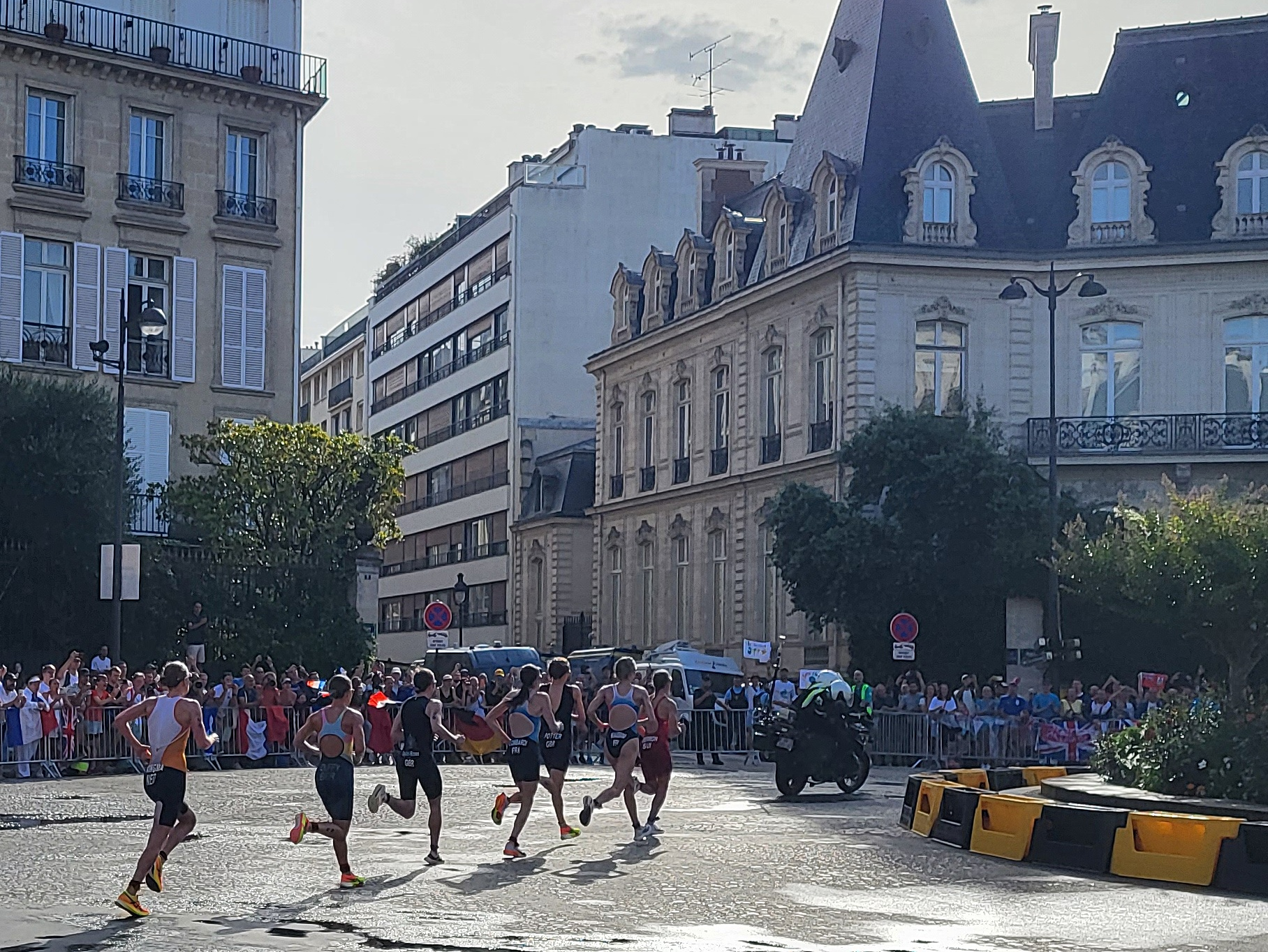
- The leading group passes by the Place François-I^{er} during the running segment
- Date: 31 July 2024
- Competitors: 55 from 33 nations

Medalists
1st place, gold medalist(s)		Cassandre Beaugrand	France
2nd place, silver medalist(s)		Julie Derron	Switzerland
3rd place, bronze medalist(s)		Beth Potter	Great Britain

The women's triathlon at the 2024 Summer Olympics took place on July 31. The event took place on the same day as the men's event after the men's event was postponed due to water quality issues with the Seine river. Cassandre Beaugrand of France won the gold medal, with Julie Derron of Switzerland and Beth Potter of Great Britain taking silver and bronze, respectively.

== Results ==
Rank	#	Triathlete	Nation	Swimming	Cycling	Running	Total time	Difference
1st place, gold medalist(s)	33	Cassandre Beaugrand	France	22:32	58:20	32:42	1:54:55	
2nd place, silver medalist(s)	7	Julie Derron	Switzerland	22:51	57:58	32:51	1:55:01	+0:06
3rd place, bronze medalist(s)	25	Beth Potter	Great Britain	22:25	58:26	32:59	1:55:10	+0:15
4	34	Emma Lombardi	France	22:36	58:12	33:05	1:55:16	+0:21
5	44	Flora Duffy	Bermuda	22:05	58:44	33:59	1:56:12	+1:17
6	26	Georgia Taylor-Brown	Great Britain	22:41	58:12	34:20	1:56:35	+1:40
7	49	Maya Kingma	Netherlands	22:20	58:25	34:42	1:56:53	+1:58
8	37	Laura Lindemann	Germany	22:48	59:07	33:42	1:57:01	+2:06
9	38	Lisa Tertsch	Germany	22:45	59:12	33:47	1:57:03	+2:08
10	11	Taylor Spivey	United States	22:43	58:04	34:57	1:57:11	+2:16
11	41	Maria Tomé	Portugal	24:17	57:34	33:55	1:57:13	+2:18
12	36	Nina Eim	Germany	23:38	58:16	33:57	1:57:13	+2:18
13	28	Roksana Słupek	Poland	23:33	58:18	33:59	1:57:16	+2:21
14	50	Rachel Klamer	Netherlands	23:30	58:15	34:25	1:57:39	+2:44
15	27	Kate Waugh	Great Britain	24:17	57:39	34:33	1:57:48	+2:53
16	54	Alice Betto	Italy	23:41	58:11	34:40	1:57:56	+3:01
17	43	Anna Godoy	Spain	23:33	58:17	34:57	1:58:13	+3:18
18	17	Rosa María Tapia	Mexico	24:12	57:44	35:13	1:58:29	+3:34
19	10	Taylor Knibb	United States	24:08	57:45	35:17	1:58:37	+3:42
20	23	Djenyfer Arnold	Brazil	24:03	57:49	35:31	1:58:45	+3:50
21	14	Sophie Linn	Australia	23:56	57:59	35:35	1:58:52	+3:57
22	55	Bianca Seregni	Italy	22:14	59:37	35:50	1:59:11	+4:16
23	47	Tilda Månsson	Sweden	24:03	57:48	35:59	1:59:22	+4:27
24	6	Jolien Vermeylen	Belgium	22:42	59:16	36:23	1:59:44	+4:49
25	24	Vittória Lopes	Brazil	22:18	59:42	36:41	2:00:10	+5:15
26	48	Zsanett Bragmayer	Hungary	22:34	58:15	38:12	2:00:24	+5:29
27	35	Léonie Périault	France	24:06	1:00:35	34:31	2:00:40	+5:45
28	46	Lin Xinyu	China	23:38	58:18	37:27	2:00:50	+5:55
29	19	Petra Kuříková	Czech Republic	24:02	1:00:40	34:53	2:01:02	+6:07
30	16	Lizeth Rueda	Mexico	23:55	57:58	37:52	2:01:18	+6:23
31	53	Nicole van der Kaay	New Zealand	24:13	1:00:29	35:24	2:01:33	+6:38
32	2	Julia Hauser	Austria	24:41	1:00:39	34:55	2:01:44	+6:49
33	42	Miriam Casillas	Spain	26:03	59:14	35:04	2:01:46	+6:51
34	1	Elizabeth Bravo	Ecuador	24:06	1:00:38	35:38	2:01:49	+6:54
35	21	Emy Legault	Canada	24:04	1:00:40	35:42	2:01:54	+6:59
36	51	Alberte Kjær Pedersen	Denmark	24:40	1:00:41	35:19	2:02:02	+7:07
37	4	Carolina Velásquez	Colombia	24:38	1:00:41	35:26	2:02:13	+7:18
38	5	Claire Michel	Belgium	26:05	59:16	35:37	2:02:22	+7:27
39	56	Verena Steinhauser	Italy	24:51	1:00:28	35:51	2:02:35	+7:40
40	39	Yuko Takahashi	Japan	24:11	1:00:35	36:33	2:02:42	+7:47
41	45	Erica Hawley	Bermuda	24:05	1:00:37	36:44	2:02:55	+8:00
42	15	Natalie Van Coevorden	Australia	24:18	1:00:26	36:52	2:03:01	+8:06
43	8	Cathia Schär	Switzerland	26:14	59:02	36:45	2:03:28	+8:33
44	52	Ainsley Thorpe	New Zealand	23:59	1:01:22	37:05	2:03:48	+8:53
45	40	Melanie Santos	Portugal	24:20	1:01:00	37:03	2:03:48	+8:53
46	29	Vicky van der Merwe	South Africa	26:09	1:02:07	35:33	2:05:16	+10:21
47	18	Romina Biagioli	Argentina	24:09	1:01:12	38:46	2:05:36	+10:41
48	30	Solveig Løvseth	Norway	28:00	1:00:14	36:04	2:05:49	+10:54
49	9	Kirsten Kasper	United States	22:39	1:05:47	36:48	2:06:38	+11:43
50	3	Lisa Perterer	Austria	27:52	1:00:16	37:41	2:07:27	+12:32
51	22	Edda Hannesdóttir	Iceland	24:49	1:03:25	40:55	2:10:46	+15:51
	31	Lotte Miller	Norway	24:40	Did not finish			
	20	Jeanne Lehair	Luxembourg	23:36	Did not finish			
	32	Ekaterina Shabalina	Kazakhstan	28:06	Did not finish			
	12	Manami Iijima	Guam	26:38	Did not finish			
Sources: Official results
