= Sophie Linn =

Australian triathlete (born 1995)

Personal information
- Born: 13 March 1995 (age 31) Toorak Gardens, Adelaide, South Australia

Sport
- Country: Australia
- Sport: Triathlon
Medal record
Women's triathlon
Representing Australia
Commonwealth Games
Bronze medal – third place	2022 Birmingham	Mixed relay
World Championships
Gold medal – first place	2025 Hamburg	Mixed relay

Sophie Linn (born 13 March 1995 in Adelaide) is an Australian professional triathlete. She competed at the 2022 Commonwealth Games, in Mixed relay, winning a bronze medal. She competed in the women's triathlon at the 2024 Summer Olympics in Paris, France.

== Life ==
Linn competed at the 2011 Commonwealth Youth Games. She competed for University of Michigan.

She competed at the 2022 Gold Coast Triathlon, winning a gold medal, and 2022 World Triathlon Championship Series Hamburg, winning a silver medal.

In July 2025, she was a member of the Australian team which won the gold medal at the World Triathlon Mixed Relay Championships in Hamburg, alongside Luke Willian, Matt Hauser and Emma Jeffcoat.
