= Syria at the 2018 Summer Youth Olympics =

- IOC code: SYR
- NOC: Syrian Olympic Committee
- Website: http://www.syriaolymp.org/

in Buenos Aires, Argentina 6 – 18 October 2018
- Competitors: 3 in 3 sports
- Medals: Gold 0 Silver 0 Bronze 0 Total 0

Summer Youth Olympics appearances
- 2010; 2014; 2018

Syria participated at the 2018 Summer Youth Olympics in Buenos Aires, Argentina from 6 October to 18 October 2018.

== Competitors ==
Sport	Boys	Girls	Total
Athletics	0	1	1
Equestrian	1	0	1
Triathlon	1	0	1

== Athletics ==
Syria qualified one athlete.

- Women's 1500m - 1 athlete

Athlete	Event	Stage 1		Stage 2		Final Placing
Athlete	Event	Result	Rank	Result	Rank	Final Placing
Louris Danoun	Women's 1500m/Cross Country	5:00.92	16	DNS		DNF

== Equestrian ==
Syria qualified a rider based on its ranking in the FEI World Jumping Challenge Rankings.

- Individual Jumping - Momen Zindaki

== Triathlon ==
Syria qualified one athlete based on its performance at the 2018 Asian Youth Olympic Games Qualifier.

Individual

Athlete	Event	Swim (750m)	Trans 1	Bike (20 km)	Trans 2	Run (5 km)	Total Time	Rank
Zakaria Alkharrat	Boys	11:27	0:27	31:47	0:26	18:27	1:02:34	30

Relay

Athlete	Event	Total Times per Athlete (Swim 250m, Bike 6.6 km, Run 1.8 km)	Total Group Time	Rank
World Team 1 Lo Ho Yan (HKG); Mohamed Tarek (EGY); Maram Yasseer Mohamed (EGY); Zakaria Alkharrat (SYR)	Mixed Relay	24:35 (16); 23:16 (13); 27:07 (14); 24:40 (14)	1:39:38	14
