= Triathlon at the 2018 Summer Youth Olympics – Mixed relay =

Mixed relay at the III Summer Youth Olympic Games
- Venue: Parque Polideportivo Roca
- Date: 11 October
- Competitors: 64

Medalists
1st place, gold medalist(s)		Sif Bendix Madsen; Alessio Crociani; Anja Weber; Alexandre Montez	Mixed-NOCs
2nd place, silver medalist(s)		Charlotte Derbyshire; Dylan McCullough; Brea Roderick; Joshua Ferris	Mixed-NOCs
3rd place, bronze medalist(s)		Marie Horn; Henry Graf; Emilie Noyer; Igor Bellido Mikhailova	Mixed-NOCs

These are the results for the mixed relay event at the 2018 Summer Youth Olympics.

== Results ==
Rank	Team	Triathletes	Individual Time	Total time
1st place, gold medalist(s)	Europe 1	Sif Bendix Madsen (DEN); Alessio Crociani (ITA); Anja Weber (SUI); Alexandre Montez (POR)	21:42 (1); 20:55 (3); 22:40 (1); 20:55 (1)	1:26:12
2nd place, silver medalist(s)	Oceania 1	Charlotte Derbyshire (AUS); Dylan McCullough (NZL); Brea Roderick (NZL); Joshua Ferris (AUS)	22:26 (5); 19:51 (1); 23:00 (2); 21:15 (2)	1:26:32
3rd place, bronze medalist(s)	Europe 3	Marie Horn (GER); Henry Graf (GER); Emilie Noyer (FRA); Igor Bellido Mikhailova (ESP)	23:39 (12); 20:42 (2); 23:13 (3); 21:25 (3)	1:28:59
4	Europe 4	Hanne Peeters (BEL); Gergely Kiss (HUN); Nikolett Ferenczi (HUN); Calum Young (GBR)	23:01 (9); 21:00 (4); 23:42 (5); 21:38 (5)	1:29:21
5	Europe 6	Ines Rico (POR); Jan Škrjanc (SLO); Libby Coleman (GBR); Rik Malcorps (BEL)	23:01 (10); 21:27 (7); 23:14 (4); 21:53 (6)	1:29:21
6	Americas 2	Karina Clemant (VEN); Cristian Andres Triana Peña (COL); Giovanna Lacerda (BRA); Javier Antonio de la Peña Schott (MEX)	23:23 (11); 21:26 (6); 23:49 (6); 22:01 (7)	1:30:39 1P
7	Americas 3	Delfina Orlandini (ARG); Gabriel Terán Carvajal (ECU); Maria Fernanda Barbosa Sánchez (COL); Solen Wood (CAN)	22:49 (7); 21:27 (7); 24:52 (9); 22:35 (8)	1:31:43
8	Europe 5	Chiara Lobba (ITA); Loic Triponez (SUI); Alevtina Stetsenko (RUS); Itamar Shevach Levanon (ISR)	24:00 (14); 21:54 (10); 24:26 (8); 21:28 (4)	1:31:48
9	Africa 1	Amber Schlebusch (RSA); Christiaan Stroebel (RSA); Syrine Fattoum (TUN); Mohamed Aziz Sebai (TUN)	22:01 (2); 21:17 (5); 25:27 (12); 23:09 (9)	1:31:54 1P
10	Asia 1	Lee Jung-won (KOR); Teppei Tokuyama (JPN); Emma Ada Middleditch (SGP); Daniil Zubtsov (KAZ)	22:57 (8); 21:44 (9); 24:01 (7); 23:15 (10)	1:31:57
11	Americas 5	Maryhelen Albright (USA); Giannon Lisandro Eights (ARU); Naomi Espinoza Guablocho (PER); Dominic Pugliese (ISV)	22:45 (6); 23:11 (12); 25:15 (10); 24:06 (13)	1:35:17
12	Americas 4	Niuska Figueredo Bringa (CUB); Pedro Boff (BRA); Enya Noel (GRN); Alejandro Rodríguez Díez (CUB)	24:22 (15); 22:05 (11); 26:21 (13); 23:29 (12)	1:36:17
13	Asia 2	Maki Uchida (JPN); Hung Tik Long (HKG); Yu Xinying (CHN); Chong Xian Hao (MAS)	23:40 (13); 24:22 (14); 25:21 (11); 23:26 (11)	1:36:49 1P
14	World Team 1	Lo Ho Yan (HKG); Mohamed Tarek (EGY); Maram Yasseer Mohamed (EGY); Zakaria Alkharrat (SYR)	24:35 (16); 23:16 (13); 27:07 (14); 24:40 (14)	1:39:38
	Americas 1	Paula Vega (ECU); Cristobal Baeza Muñoz (CHI); Sofia Rodríguez Moreno (MEX); Andrew Shellenberger (USA)	22:11 (3)	DNF
	Europe 2	Eva Daniels (LUX); Andreas Carlsson (SWE); Barbara de Koning (NED); Baptiste Passemard (FRA)	22:24 (4)	DNF
