= Triathlon at the 2018 Summer Youth Olympics – Boys' =

Boys' at the III Summer Youth Olympic Games
- Venue: Parque Polideportivo Roca
- Date: October 8
- Competitors: 32 from 32 nations

Medalists
1st place, gold medalist(s)		Dylan McCullough	New Zealand
2nd place, silver medalist(s)		Alexandre Montez	Portugal
3rd place, bronze medalist(s)		Alessio Crociani	Italy

These are the results for the boys' event at the 2018 Summer Youth Olympics.

== Results ==
Rank	Triathlete	Nation	Swimming	Transit 1	Cycling	Transit 2	Running	Total time	Difference
1st place, gold medalist(s)	Dylan McCullough	New Zealand	9:29	0:28	26:52	0:28	16:10	53:27	+0:00
2nd place, silver medalist(s)	Alexandre Montez	Portugal	9:44	0:31	27:23	0:28	15:33	53:39	+0:12
3rd place, bronze medalist(s)	Alessio Crociani	Italy	9:29	0:27	26:52	0:28	16:29	53:45	+0:18
4	Andreas Carlsson	Sweden	9:34	0:33	27:32	0:26	15:48	53:53	+0:26
5	Baptiste Passemard	France	9:40	0:27	27:32	0:26	16:21	54:26	+0:59
6	Igor Bellido Mikhailova	Spain	9:44	0:30	27:25	0:26	16:38	54:43	+1:16
7	Andrew Shellenberger	United States	9:31	0:28	27:41	0:30	16:37	54:47	+1:20
8	Cristobal Baeza Muñoz	Chile	9:36	0:29	27:34	0:28	16:52	54:59	+1:32
9	Henry Graf	Germany	9:39	0:29	27:31	0:30	16:58	55:07	+1:40
10	Calum Young	Great Britain	9:36	0:31	27:34	0:27	17:04	55:12	+1:45
11	Cristian Andres Triana Peña	Colombia	9:47	0:26	27:30	0:28	17:17	55:28	+2:01
12	Javier Antonio de la Peña Schott	Mexico	9:40	0:32	28:40	0:26	16:27	55:45	+2:18
13	Gergely Kiss	Hungary	9:31	0:32	28:47	0:29	16:39	55:58	+2:31
14	Loic Triponez	Switzerland	9:45	0:31	27:25	0:30	18:08	56:19	+2:52
15	Itamar Shevach Levanon	Israel	10:29	0:28	28:51	0:28	16:36	56:52	+3:25
16	Solen Wood	Canada	11:14	0:34	28:45	0:28	15:55	56:56	+3:29
17	Gabriel Terán Carvajal	Ecuador	9:44	0:28	28:39	0:29	17:38	56:58	+3:31
18	Joshua Ferris	Australia	10:49	0:31	28:28	0:29	16:51	57:08	+3:41
19	Jan Škrjanc	Slovenia	9:47	0:29	28:33	0:26	18:04	57:19	+3:52
20	Pedro Boff	Brazil	10:04	0:30	29:03	0:29	17:20	57:26	+3:59
21	Christiaan Stroebel	South Africa	9:39	0:32	27:31	0:28	19:24	57:34	+4:07
22	Alejandro Rodríguez Díez	Cuba	10:47	0:31	29:16	0:27	16:39	57:40	+4:13
23	Teppei Tokuyama	Japan	9:59	0:29	29:10	0:34	17:38	57:50	+4:23
24	Rik Malcorps	Belgium	10:00	0:32	29:05	0:25	18:21	58:23	+4:56
25	Mohamed Aziz Sebai	Tunisia	10:42	0:28	29:24	0:29	17:51	58:54	+5:27
26	Daniil Zubtsov	Kazakhstan	11:19	0:31	28:43	0:36	17:58	59:07	+5:40 1P
27	Mohamed Tarek	Egypt	10:28	0:34	29:34	0:29	18:37	59:42	+6:15
28	Hung Tik Long	Hong Kong	10:45	0:27	29:20	0:28	19:13	1:00:13	+6:46
29	Chong Xian Hao	Malaysia	11:30	0:30	28:36	0:30	19:19	1:00:25	+6:58
30	Zakaria Alkharrat	Syria	11:27	0:27	31:47	0:26	18:27	1:02:34	+9:07
31	Giannon Lisandro Eights	Aruba	10:31	0:35	32:02	0:33	18:53	1:02:34	+9:07
	Dominic Pugliese	Virgin Islands	11:32	0:32				LAP	

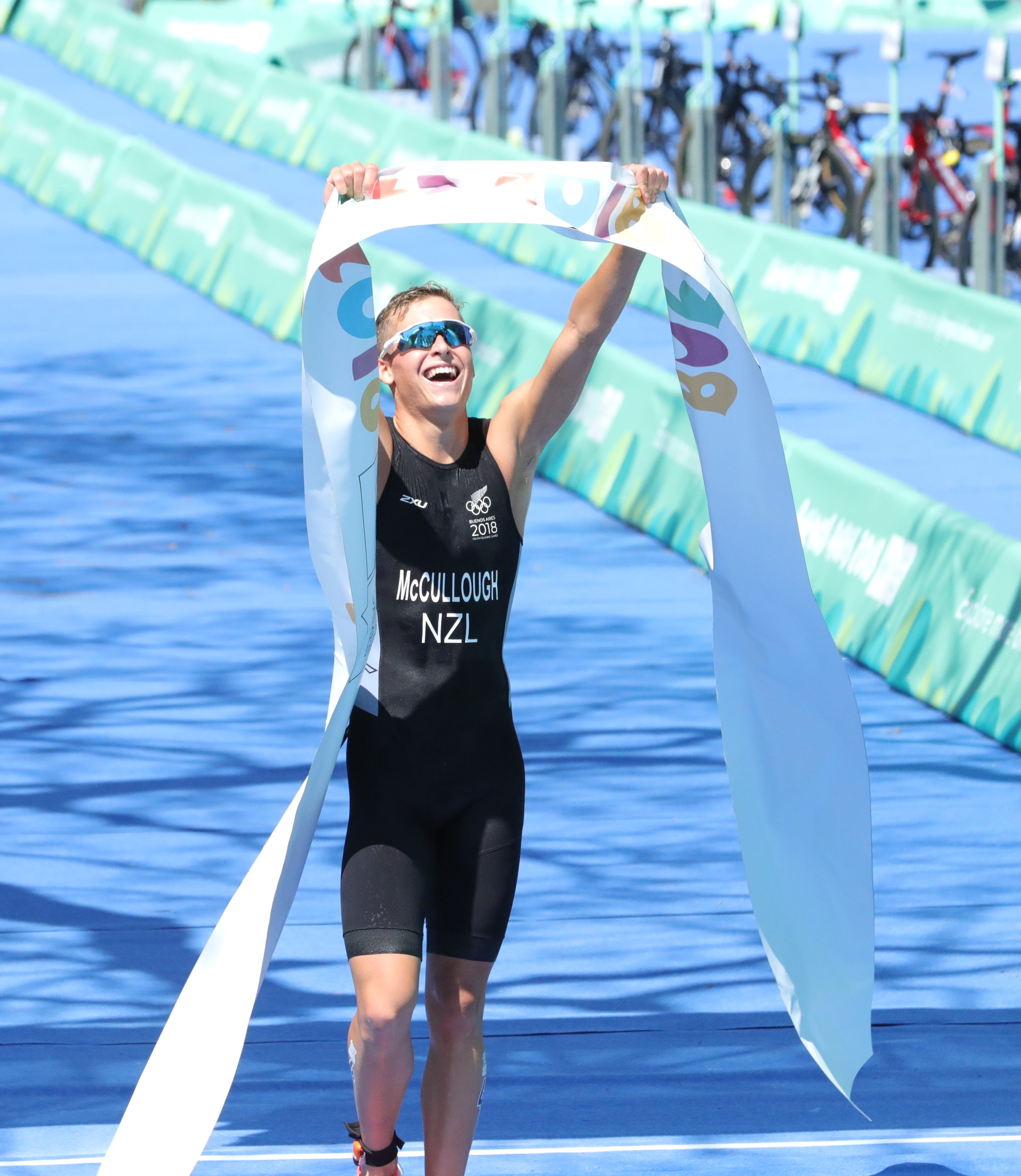
Dylan McCullough, Gold medailist

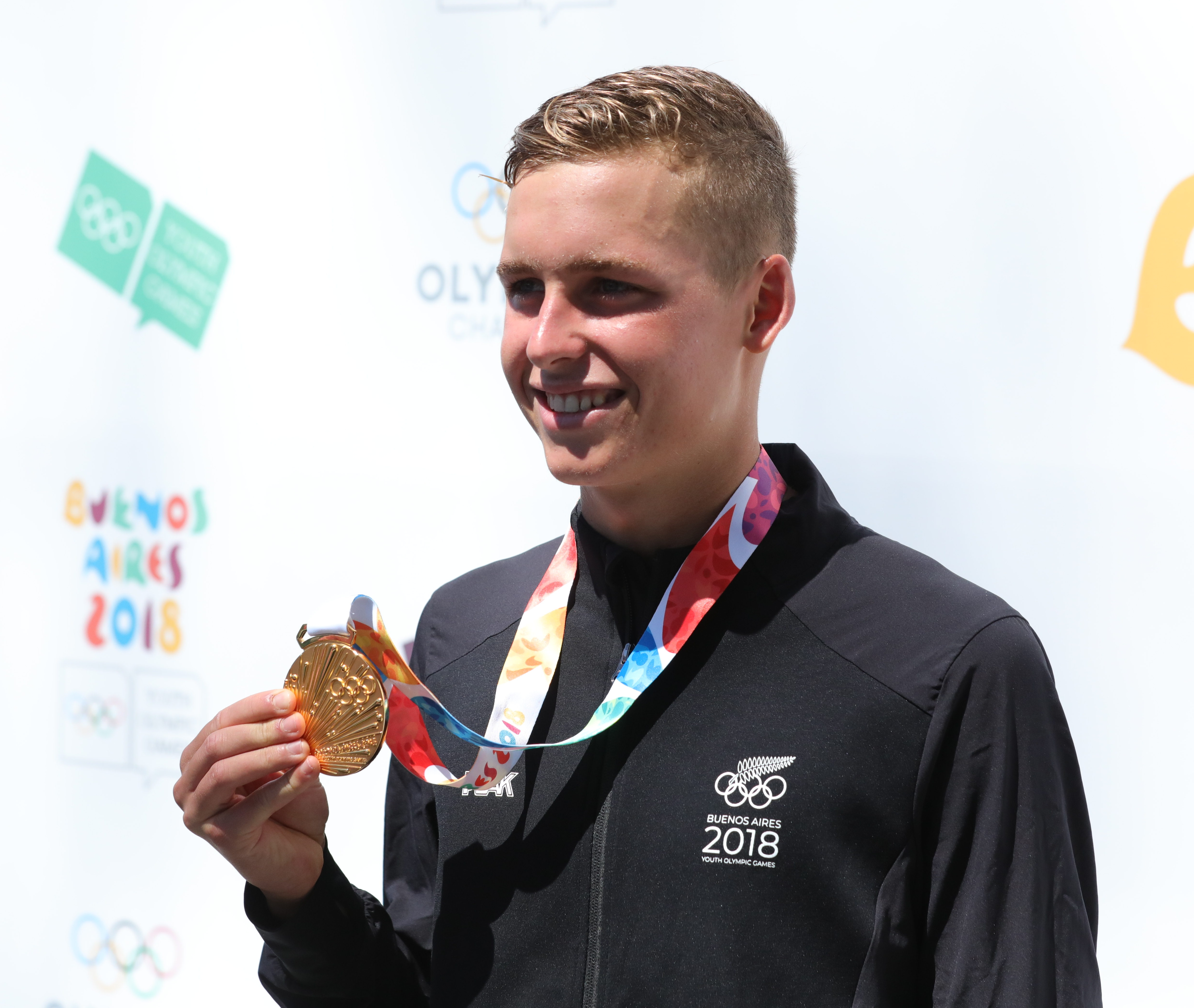
Dylan McCullough, Youth Olympic Champion

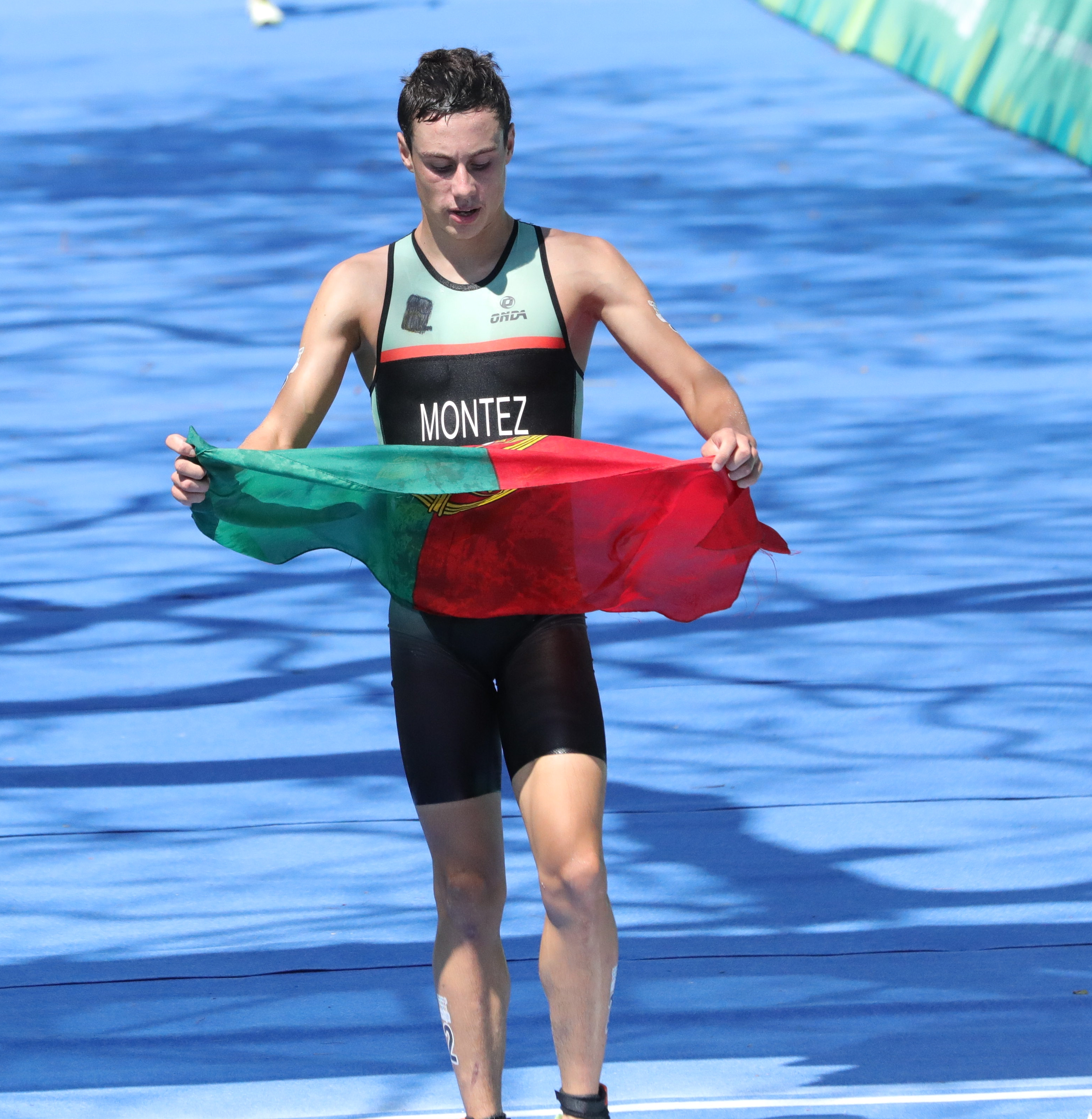
Alexandre Montez, Silver medailist

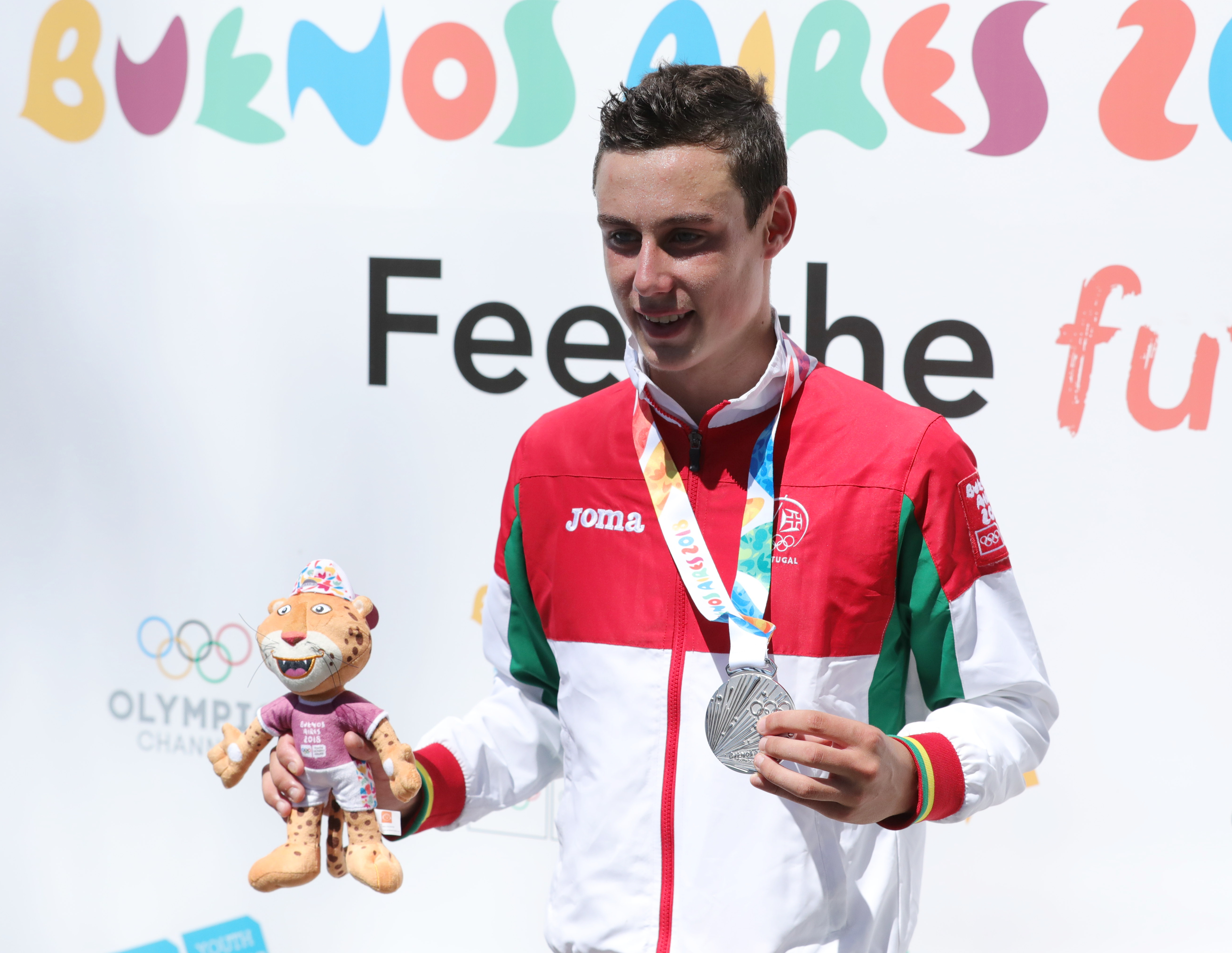
Alexandre Montez, Vice Youth Olympic Champion

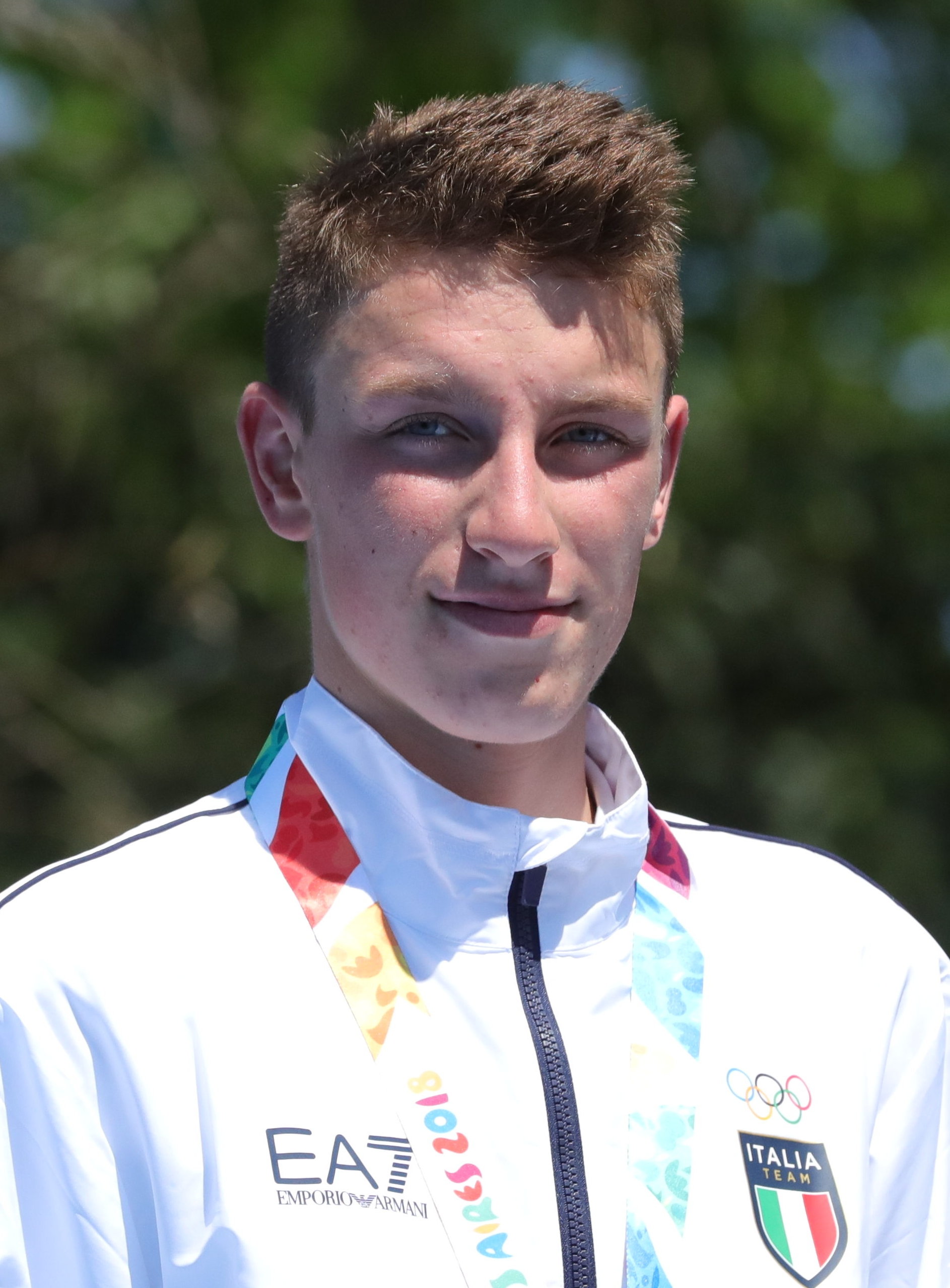
Alessio Crociani, Bronze medailist

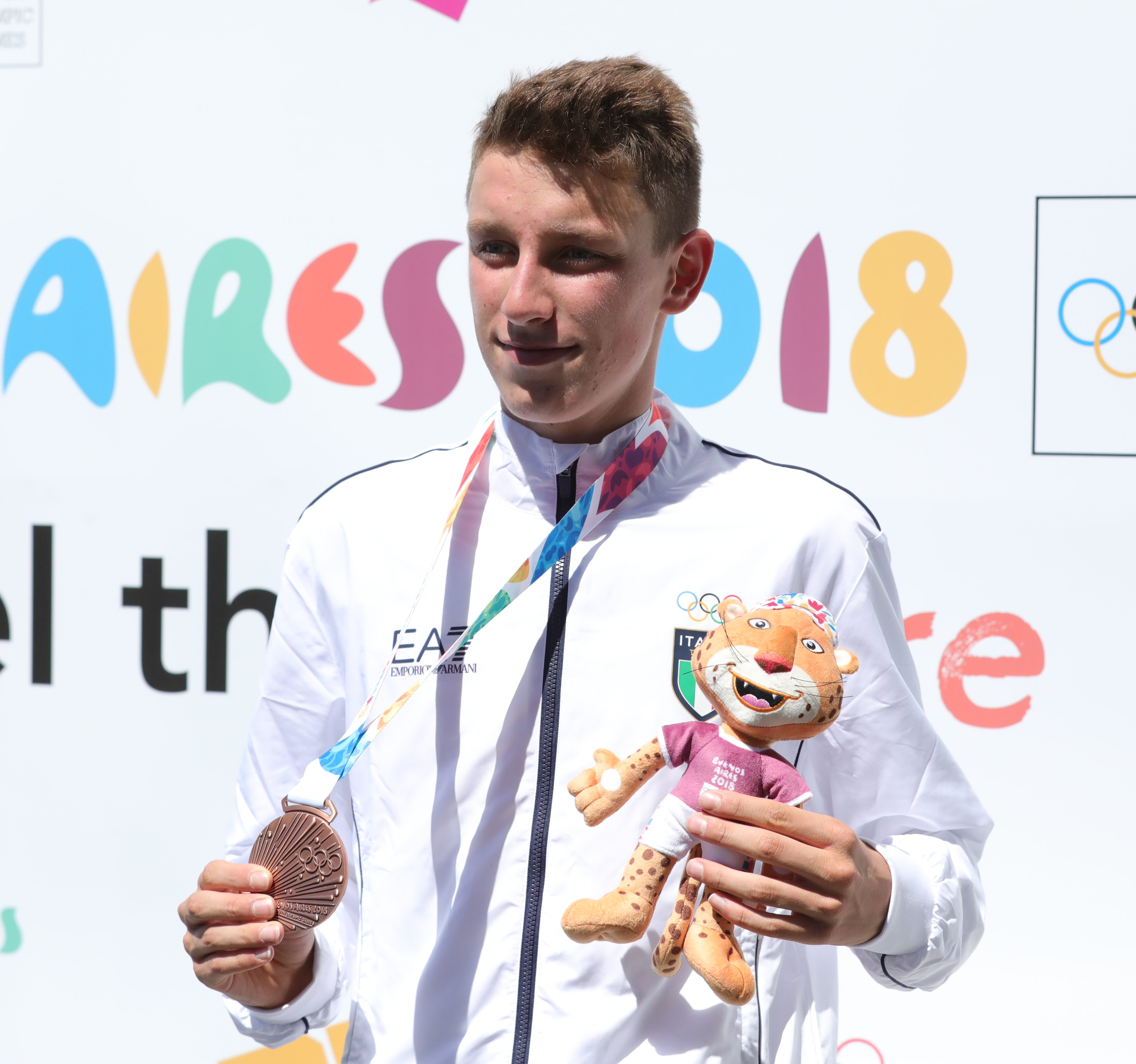
Alessio Crociani, Bronze medailist

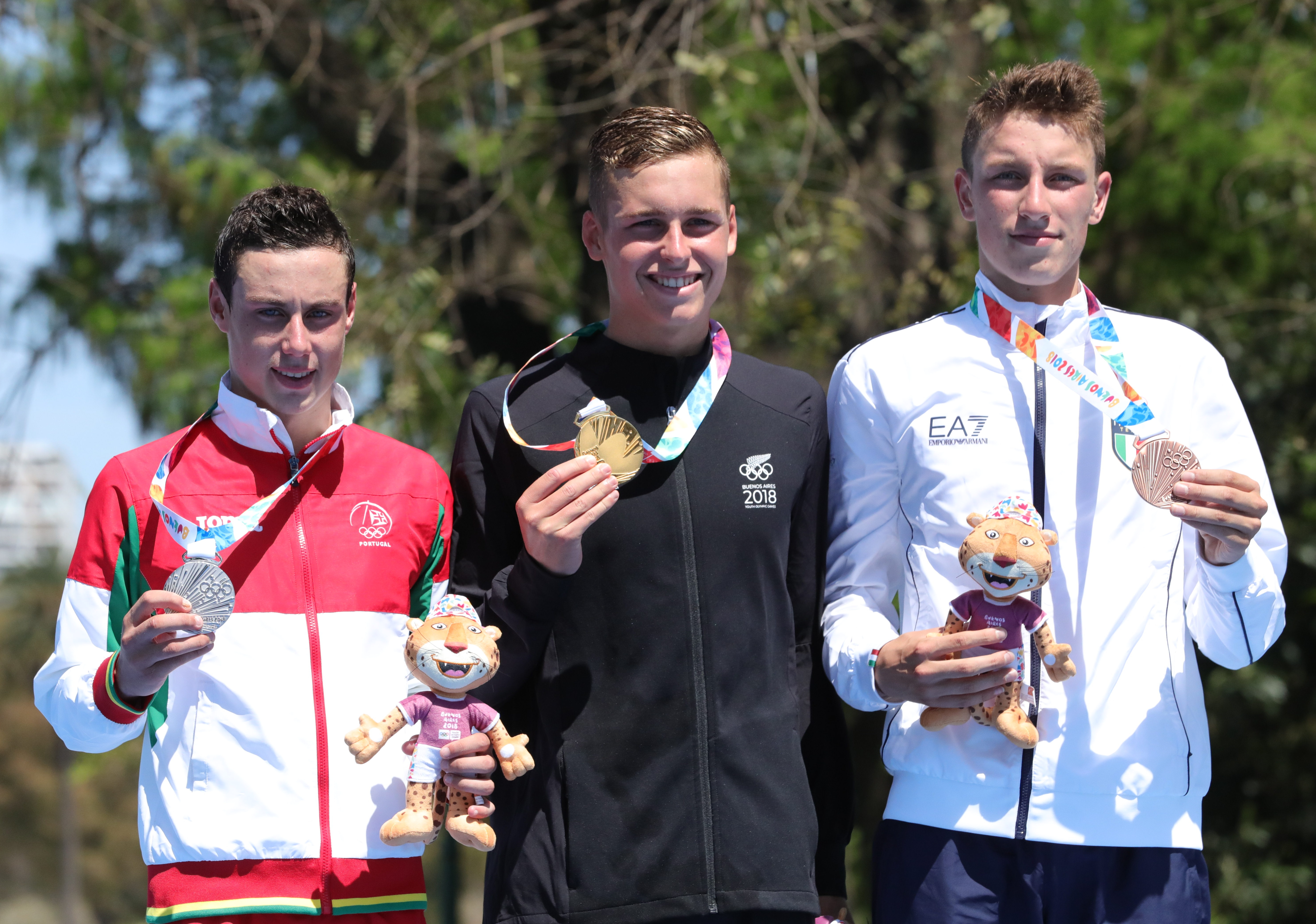
The medailists: Alexandre Montez, Dylan McCullough, Alessio Crociani
