= Emma Jeffcoat =

Australian triathlete (born 1994)

Personal information
- Nationality: Australian
- Born: 2 December 1994 (age 31) Collaroy, New South Wales, Australia
- Education: University of Sydney
- Occupations: Nurse & FRNSW Firefighter

Sport
- Country: Australia
- Sport: Triathlon
- Turned pro: 2015

Achievements and titles
- Olympic finals: 2020: Women - 26th; mixed relay - 9th

Emma Jeffcoat (born 2 December 1994) is an Australian triathlete.

== Career ==
Emma Jeffcoat competed in the German Triathlon-Bundesliga for the TV LemgoTV Lemgo club.

In March 2016, she became a champion of the U23-Oceania triathlon and second-class Oceania champion in the elite class. She won ITU Triathlon World Cup events in Mooloolaba and Chengdu in 2018 and Tiszaujvaros in 2019, and was part of a relay team that won in Abu Dhabi in 2019. She placed 26th in the women's triathlon and 9th in the relay at the 2021 Olympics.

In 2020, she was hit by a car and broke her collarbone. She worked as a nurse during some of the COVID-19 pandemic. She then competed in the Women's and mixed relay triathlon events at the 2020 Tokyo Olympics in 2021.

In July 2025, he was a member of the Australian team which won the gold medal at the World Triathlon Mixed Relay Championships in Hamburg, alongside Sophie Linn, Matt Hauser and Luke Willian.
