= Gillian Backhouse =

Australian triathlete (born 1991)

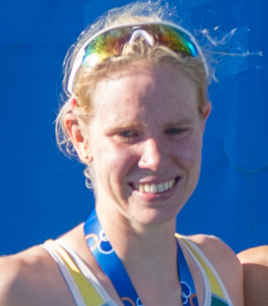

Personal information
- Born: 20 June 1991 (age 35) Penrith, New South Wales
- Height: 178 cm (5 ft 10 in)
- Weight: 63 kg (139 lb)

Sport
- Country: Australia
- Sport: Triathlon
- Coached by: Stephen Moss
Medal record
Representing Australia
Women's Triathlon
ITU Triathlon Mixed Relay World Championships
Silver medal – second place	2015 Hamburg	Mixed relay
Commonwealth Games
Gold medal – first place	2018 Gold Coast	Mixed relay

Gillian Backhouse (born 20 June 1991) is an Australian triathlete. She won the gold medal in the mixed relay event at the 2018 Commonwealth Games.
