= Luke Willian =

Australian triathlete

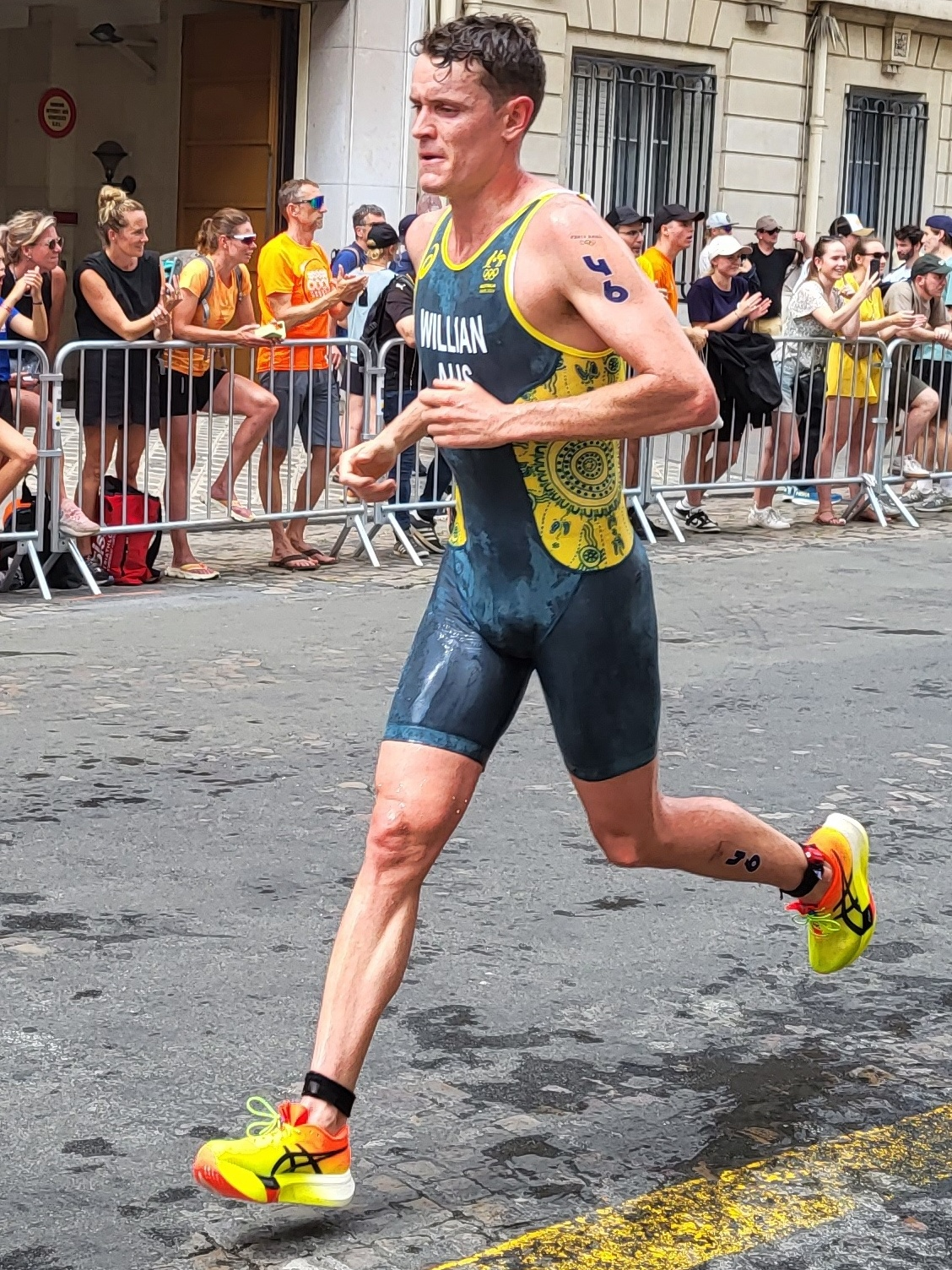

Personal information
- Born: 11 October 1996 (age 30)

Sport
- Country: Australia
- Sport: Triathlon
Medal record
Men's triathlon
Representing Australia
World Championships
Gold medal – first place	2025 Hamburg	Mixed relay

Luke Willian (born 11 October 1996) is an Australian triathlete.

== Early life ==
From Hawthorne, Queensland, he has been coached by Warwick Dalziel since he was eleven years old. He won junior cross country at St Laurence's College.

== Career ==
He made his senior Australian debut at the 2018 Commonwealth Games.

He won the World Triathlon Cup Wollongong (in Australia) in April 2024. He placed third at the World Triathlon Championship Series event in Yokohama in May 2024. With that result, he received an automatic nomination to compete at the 2024 Paris Olympics.

In July 2025, he was a member of the Australian team which won the gold medal at the World Triathlon Mixed Relay Championships in Hamburg, alongside Sophie Linn, Matt Hauser and Emma Jeffcoat.
