= Dylan McCullough =

New Zealand triathlete

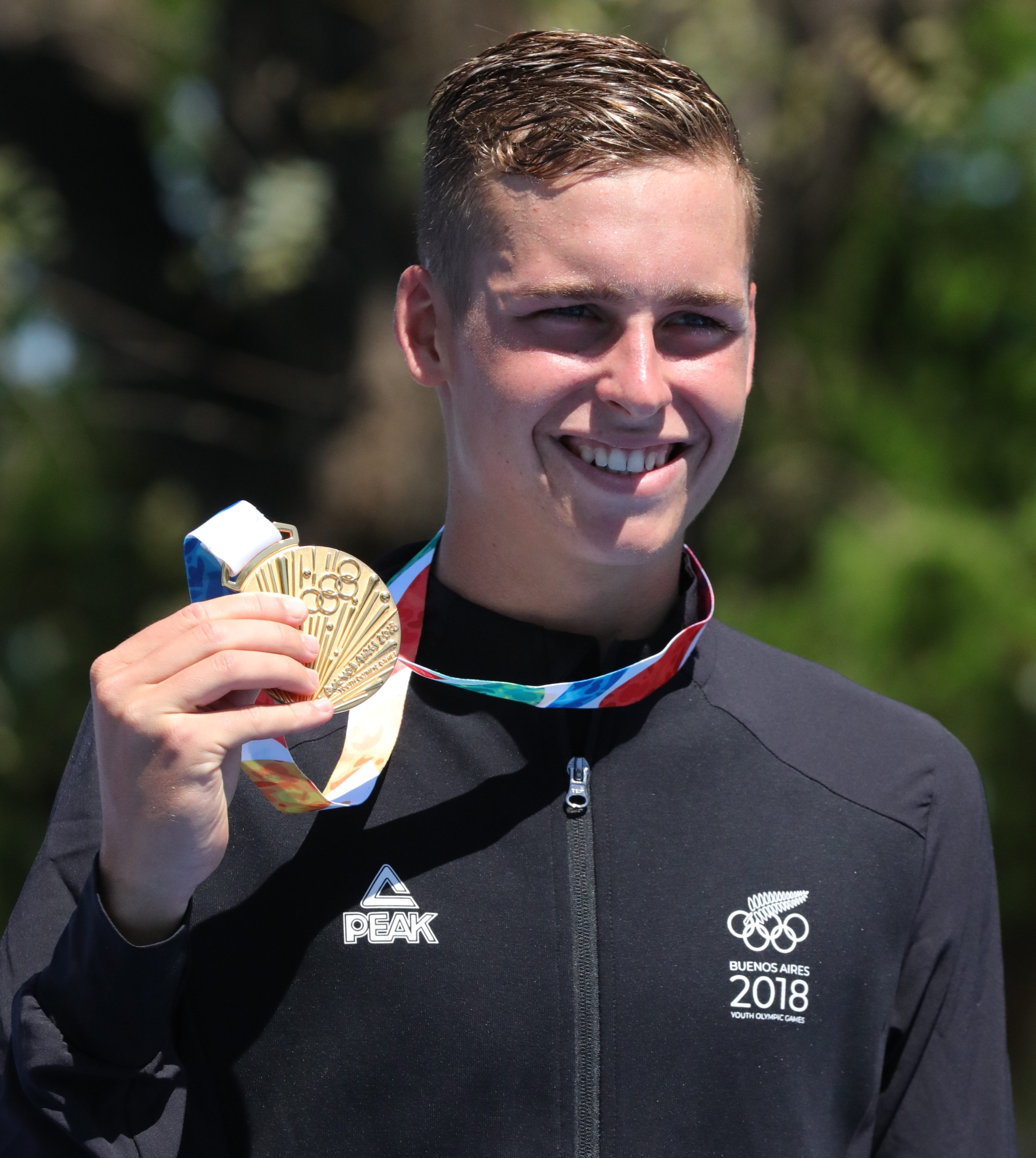
- McCullough in 2018

Personal information
- Born: 15 February 2001 (age 25) Auckland, New Zealand
- Height: 181 cm (5 ft 11 in)

Sport
- Country: New Zealand
Medal record
Men's triathlon
Representing New Zealand
World Championships
| Bronze medal – third place | 2024 Hambrg | Mixed relay |
Youth Olympic Games
| Gold medal – first place | 2018 Buenos Aires | Individual |
| Silver medal – second place | 2018 Buenos Aires | Mixed relay |

Dylan McCullough (born 15 February 2001) is a New Zealand triathlete. He was a bronze medalist in 2024 at the World Triathlon Mixed Relay Championships.

== Early life ==
From Auckland, he attended ACG Strathallan in Karaka and Saint Kentigern College.

== Career ==
He won a gold medal in the triathlon at the 2018 Youth Olympics in Buenos Aires. From 2019, he was coached by John Hellemans. He made his first world cup podium in Japan in 2023.

In March 2024, he won both the New Zealand elite and U23 titles at the Oceania Sprint Championship in Devonport, Tasmania. He was a bronze medalist in 2024 at the World Triathlon Mixed Relay Championships in Hamburg.

He was selected for the 2024 Paris Olympics.
