= Olivia Mathias =

Welsh triathlete

Personal information
- Born: 12 October 1998 (age 27) Newark-on-trent, Nottinghamshire, England

Sport
- Country: Great Britain; Wales
- Sport: Triathlon
- Event(s): Individual, relay

Achievements and titles
- World finals: 1
- Commonwealth finals: 2
Medal record
Triathlon
Representing Wales
Commonwealth Games
Silver medal – second place	2022 Birmingham	Mixed relay

Olivia Mathias (born 12 October 1998) is a Welsh professional triathlete. She competed at the 2022 Commonwealth Games, in Mixed relay, winning a silver medal.

She competed at the 2018 Commonwealth Games. In August 2019, she won silver in the women's U23 race at the Triathlon World Championships in Lausanne, Switzerland.

She competed at the 2022 Europe Triathlon Cup Kitzbühel, winning a gold medal.
