= Tayler Reid =

New Zealand triathlete

Personal information
- Born: 2 October 1996 (age 29) Gisborne, New Zealand
- Height: 1.83 m (6 ft 0 in)
- Weight: 69 kg (152 lb)

Sport
- Country: New Zealand
- Sport: Triathlon
- Coached by: Stephen Sheldrake
Medal record
Men's triathlon
Representing New Zealand
World Championships
Bronze medal – third place	2024 Hambrg	Mixed relay
Commonwealth Games
Bronze medal – third place	2018 Gold Coast	Mixed relay

Tayler Reid (born 2 October 1996) is a New Zealand triathlete who represented his country at the 2018 Commonwealth Games on the Gold Coast. He won a bronze medal in the mixed relay with teammates Andrea Hewitt, Nicole van der Kaay, and Ryan Sissons, and finished 11th in the men's triathlon. Reid also competes in Super League Triathlon.

Born in Gisborne, Reid was educated at Gisborne Boys' High School and Campion College, Gisborne.
