= Andrea Hewitt =

New Zealand triathlete

Andrea Hansen MNZM
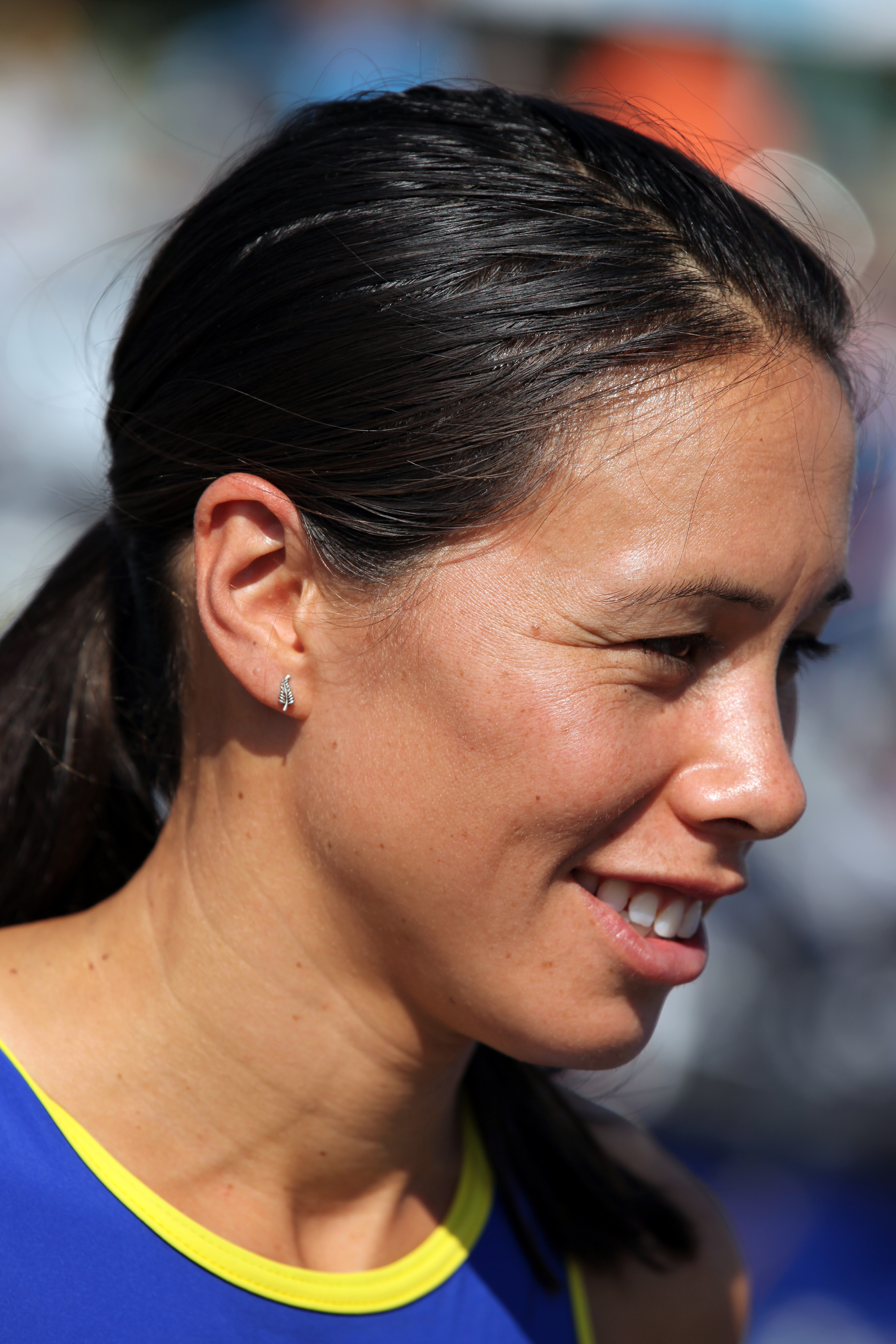
- Andrea Hewitt, gold medalist in Nice 2012

Personal information
- Born: Andrea Hewitt; 4 April 1982 (age 44) Christchurch, New Zealand
- Height: 1.60 m (5 ft 3 in)
- Weight: 51 kg (112 lb)

Sport
- Country: New Zealand
- Turned pro: 2005
Medal record
Representing New Zealand
Women's triathlon
ITU Triathlon World Championships
Gold medal – first place	2005 Gamagori	U23
Silver medal – second place	2011	Elite
Silver medal – second place	2015	Elite
Bronze medal – third place	2014	Elite
Bronze medal – third place	2009	Elite
Bronze medal – third place	2014 Weihai	Long Distance
Bronze medal – third place	2011 Lausanne	Sprint
Commonwealth Games
Bronze medal – third place	2006 Melbourne	Individual
Bronze medal – third place	2018 Gold Coast	Mixed relay
OTU Triathlon Oceania Championships
Gold medal – first place	2010 Wellington	Elite
ASTC Triathlon Asian Championships
Bronze medal – third place	2005 Singapore	Elite

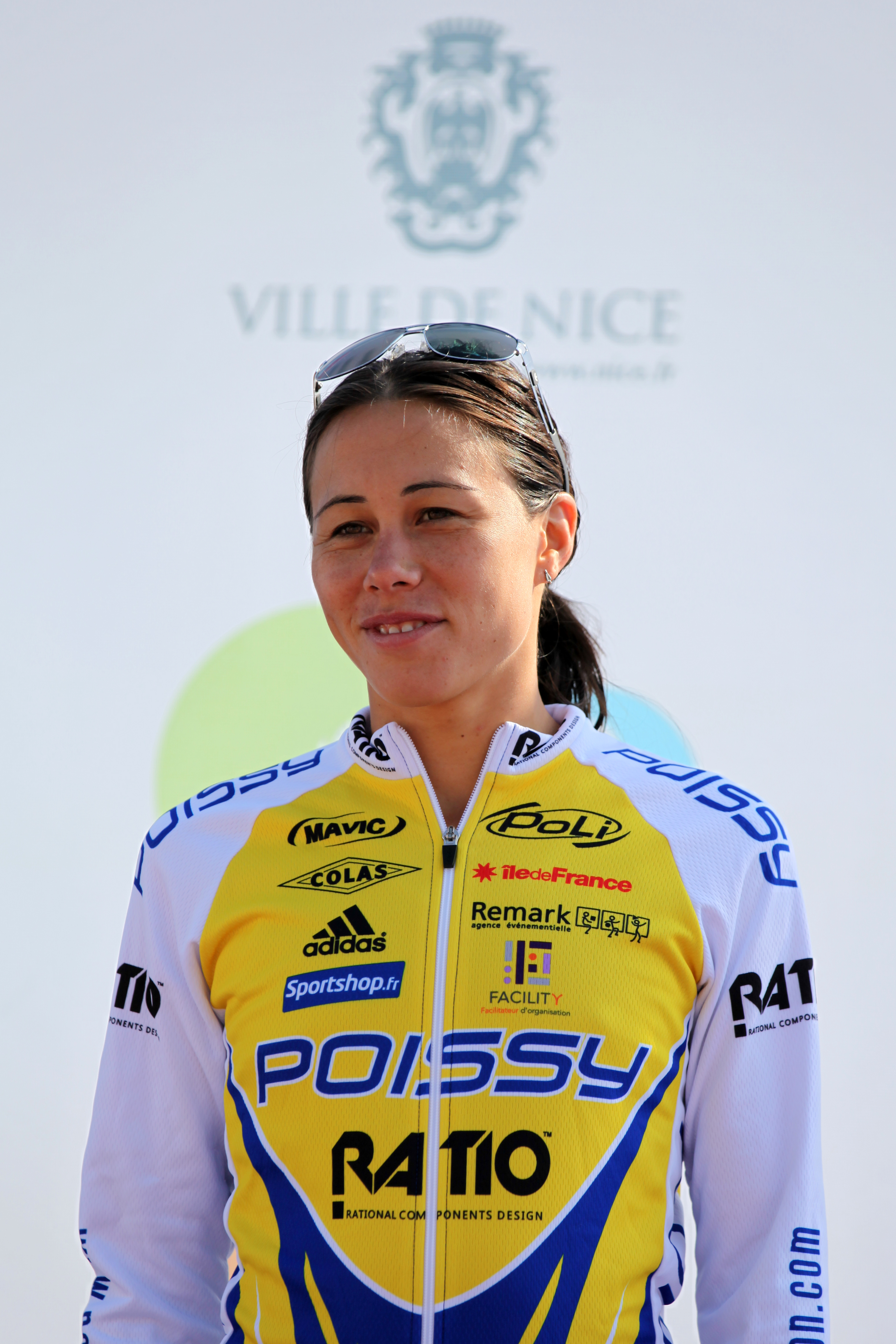
Andrea Hewitt, winner of the Grand Prix triathlon in Nice, 2012.

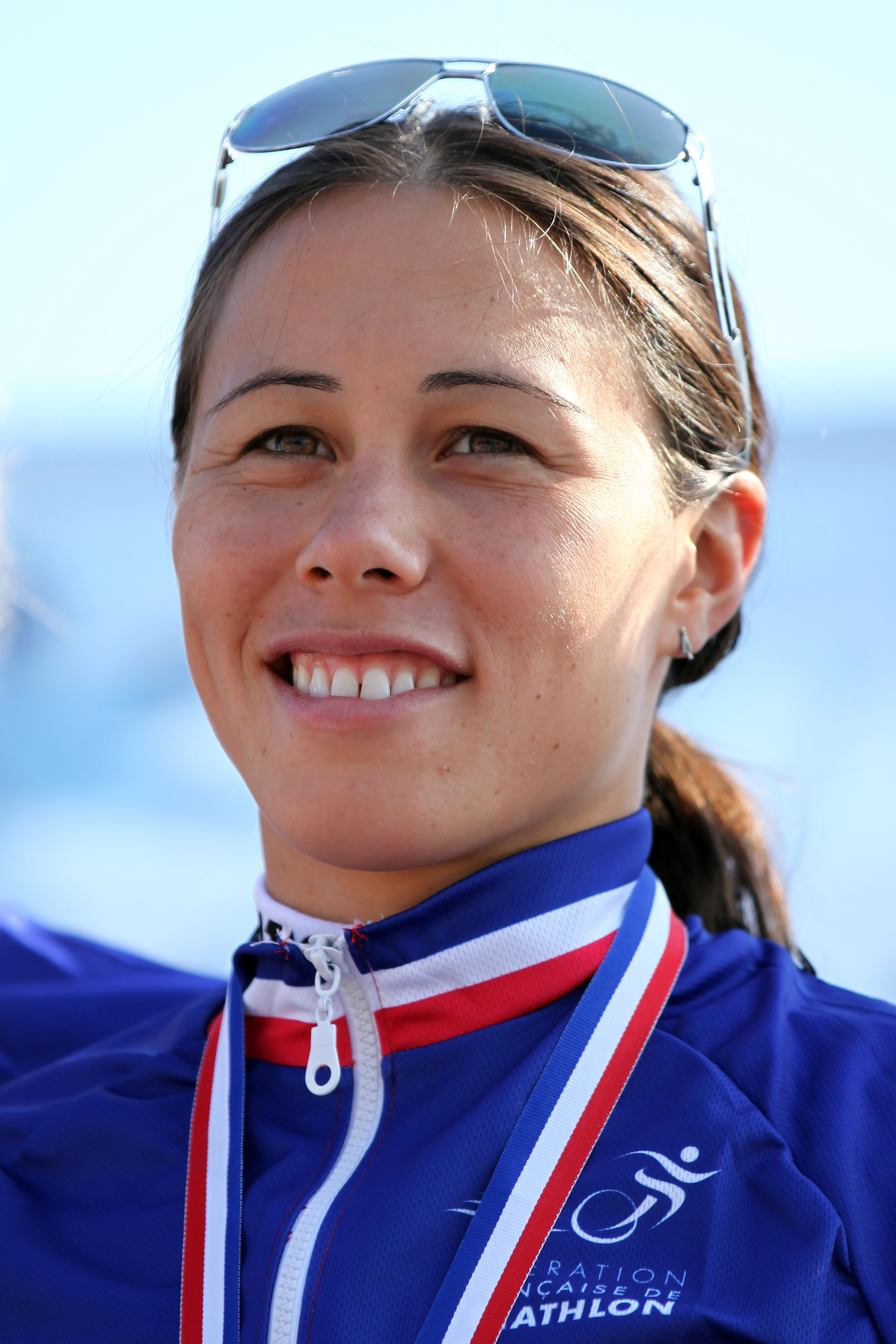
Andrea Hewitt, winner of the Grand Prix triathlon in Nice, 2012.

Andrea Hansen MNZM (née Hewitt, born 4 April 1982) is a New Zealand triathlete who placed third at the 2009 ITU Triathlon World Championships and competed at the 2008, 2012, and 2016 Summer Olympics.

== Biography ==
Hewitt was born in Christchurch, New Zealand, in 1982. She lived together with the French triathlete Laurent Vidal, who was also her coach and fiancé, in Sète on the Mediterranean from May to December, and for the rest of the year she returned to Christchurch until his death on 10 November 2015 from a heart attack. At the University of Canterbury in New Zealand she completed a Bachelor in Commerce and Economics. Andrea Hewitt's sisters are successful sportswomen as well. Tina, her elder sister, won the New Zealand Championship in Surf Life Saving, and Sara is part of the water polo National Team.

=== Athletic career ===
Hewitt's early athletic career was as a competitive pool swimmer and a surf life saver. She was a well known swimmer when at the beginning of 2005, at the age of 22, she decided to convert to triathlon and straight away won the bronze medal at the New Zealand U23 Championships and was admitted to the National Team. In autumn 2005, after having been into triathlon for not more than half a year, Hewitt won the U23 World Championships in Gamagori. In 2006, she took part in the first World Cup of her life, placing third in Mooloolaba (Elite category). In 2007, she won her first World Cup race in Kitzbühel and began taking part in the prestigious French Club Championship Series Lyonnaise des Eaux. In 2008, she placed 8th in the Olympic Games.

In 2009, Hewitt took part in seven out of eight competitions of the Dextro Energy World Championship Series and won three medals: gold in Madrid, silver in Yokohama and bronze in Kitzbühel, in the overall ranking she placed third.

At the beginning of the 2010 season Hewitt won the Oceania Championships and then achieved six top ten positions at the Elite Cup in Hy-Vee and at five of the six World Championship Series triathlons. In the World Championship Rankings 2010, Hewitt was number sixth. In France, Hewitt again represented Beauvais in the Lyonnaise des Eaux circuit and again played the decisive role. At Dunkirk and at Tourangeaux she won the gold medal, at the Grand Final of the Lyonnaise circuit in La Baule (Triathlon Audencia) she won silver. Hewitt did not take part at Beauvais and Paris, where Hollie Avil was the best triathlete of her club. Thus in 2010 again Beauvais owes its first place in the overall ranking of the French Club Championship to Andrea Hewitt and Hollie Avil, Anja Dittmer, and Vicky Holland. At La Baule there were no French triathletes among the three triathlètes classants l'équipe of Beauvais at all.

From 2007 to 2010, Hewitt took part in 15 French Club Championship triathlons and won 7 gold medals, 3 silver medals, and 3 bronze medals, so she may be considered the dominant figure in French triathlon as well.

In 2011, Hewitt won the World Championship Series Grand Final in Beijing, China and placed second in the overall championship rankings.

At the 2012 Summer Olympics, Hewitt finished 6th. At the 2014 Commonwealth Games Hewitt finished in 4th place in the women's individual event, and was part of the New Zealand team that finished 5th in the mixed relay event. She represented—alongside Nicky Samuels—New Zealand at the 2016 Summer Olympics in triathlon and came seventh.

== ITU results ==
In the seven years from 2005 to 2011, Hewitt took part in 58 individual ITU competitions and achieved 48 top ten positions, among which 21 medals. Unless indicated otherwise, the events are triathlons (Olympic Distance) and belong to the Elite category.

Date	Competition	Place	Rank
2005-07-03	Asian Championship	Singapore	3
2005-09-10	U23 World Championships	Gamagori	1
2005-11-13	World Cup	New Plymouth	21
2005-12-03	European Cup	Eilat	2
2006-02-19	Oceania Cup	Hobart	5
2006-03-18	Commonwealth Games	Melbourne	3
2006-03-26	World Cup	Mooloolaba	3
2006-06-04	World Cup	Madrid	2
2006-07-01	Premium European Cup	Kitzbühel	3
2006-07-30	BG World Cup	Salford	3
2006-08-20	European Cup	Geneva	DNF
2006-09-03	World Championships	Lausanne	10
2006-09-10	BG World Cup	Hamburg	45
2006-09-24	BG World Cup	Beijing	7
2006-11-12	BG World Cup	New Plymouth	10
2007-03-04	Oceania Championships	Geelong	4
2007-03-25	BG World Cup	Mooloolaba	6
2007-03-31	Oceania Cup	Wellington	4
2007-04-15	BG World Cup	Ishigaki	7
2007-06-03	BG World Cup	Madrid	2
2007-07-22	BG World Cup	Kitzbühel	1
2007-09-15	BG World Cup	Beijing	14
2008-03-09	Oceania Championships	Wellington	4
2008-03-30	BG World Cup	Mooloolaba	14
2008-04-06	BG World Cup	New Plymouth	10
2008-05-25	BG World Cup	Madrid	20
2008-06-08	BG World Championships	Vancouver	25
2008-07-20	BG World Cup	Kitzbühel	4
2008-08-18	Olympic Games	Beijing	8
2008-09-27	BG World Cup	Lorient	9
2008-10-26	BG World Cup	Huatulco	6
2009-04-05	Oceania Cup	New Plymouth	4
2009-05-02	Dextro Energy World Championship Series	Tongyeong	39
2009-05-31	Dextro Energy World Championship Series	Madrid	1
2009-06-21	Dextro Energy World Championship Series	Washington DC	6
2009-06-27	Elite Cup	Des Moines	6
2009-07-12	Dextro Energy World Championship Series	Kitzbühel	3
2009-08-15	Dextro Energy World Championship Series	London	9
2009-08-22	Dextro Energy World Championship Series	Yokohama	2
2009-09-13	Dextro Energy World Championship Series, Grand Final	Gold Coast	8
2010-03-13	Oceania Championships	Wellington	1
2010-04-11	Dextro Energy World Championship Series	Sydney	2
2010-05-08	Dextro Energy World Championship Series	Seoul	5
2010-06-12	Elite Cup	Des Moines	5
2010-07-17	Dextro Energy World Championship Series	Hamburg	6
2010-07-24	Dextro Energy World Championship Series	London	4
2010-08-15	Dextro Energy World Championship Series	Kitzbühel	3
2010-09-12	Dextro Energy World Championship Series, Grand Final	Budapest	22
2011-03-12	Oceania Championships	Wellington	6
2011-04-09	Dextro Energy World Championship Series	Sydney	3
2011-06-05	Dextro Energy World Championship Series	Madrid	4
2011-06-19	Dextro Energy World Championship Series	Kitzbühel	11
2011-07-16	Dextro Energy World Championship Series	Hamburg	4
2011-08-06	Dextro Energy World Championship Series	London	6
2011-08-19	Elite Sprint Triathlon World Championships	Lausanne	3
2011-09-11	Dextro Energy World Championship Series, Grand Final	Beijing	1
2011-09-19	Dextro Energy World Championship Series	Yokohama	1
2011-11-20	Triathlon World Cup	Auckland	1

== Honours ==
In the 2018 Queen's Birthday Honours, Hewitt was appointed a Member of the New Zealand Order of Merit, for services to triathlon.
