= Nicole van der Kaay =

New Zealand triathlete (born 1996)

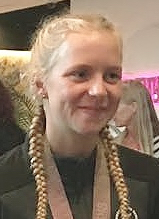
- Van der Kaay in 2018

Personal information
- Born: 10 February 1996 (age 30) Rotorua, New Zealand
- Height: 1.71 m (5 ft 7 in)
- Weight: 57 kg (126 lb)

Sport
- Country: New Zealand
- Sport: Triathlon
Medal record
Women's triathlon
Representing New Zealand
World Championships
Bronze medal – third place	2024 Hambrg	Mixed relay
Oceania Championships
Gold medal – first place	2025 Mooloolaba	Sprint
Bronze medal – third place	2025 Devonport	Individual
Commonwealth Games
Bronze medal – third place	2018 Gold Coast	Mixed relay

Nicole van der Kaay (born 10 February 1996) is a New Zealand triathlete who represented her country at the 2018 Commonwealth Games on the Gold Coast. She won a bronze medal in the mixed relay with teammates Andrea Hewitt, Tayler Reid, and Ryan Sissons, and was the best-placed New Zealander in the women's triathlon, finishing seventh. She competed at the 2022 Commonwealth Games where she came 9th in the women's event. She grew up in Taupō.

She competed in the women's triathlon at the 2024 Summer Olympics in Paris, France.
