= Jacob Birtwhistle =

Australian triathlete (born 1995)

Personal information
- Nickname: Jake
- National team: Australia
- Born: 4 January 1995 (age 31) Tasmania, Australia
- Website: www.jakebirtwhistle.com

Sport
- Country: Australia
- Sport: Triathlon
Medal record
Representing Australia
Commonwealth Games
Gold medal – first place	2018 Gold Coast	Mixed relay
Silver medal – second place	2018 Gold Coast	Triathlon
Bronze medal – third place	2022 Birmingham	Mixed relay
ITU World Triathlon Series
Gold medal – first place	2019 Hamburg	Elite
Gold medal – first place	2019 Leeds	Elite
Silver medal – second place	2018 Yokohama	Elite
Silver medal – second place	2018 Gold Coast	Elite
Silver medal – second place	2017 Edmonton	Elite
Silver medal – second place	2017 Hamburg	Elite
Silver medal – second place	2016 Hamburg	Elite
Bronze medal – third place	2018 Montreal	Elite
Bronze medal – third place	2018 Edmonton	Elite
ITU World Triathlon Series - Mixed Team Relay
Gold medal – first place	2019 Abu Dhabi	Elite
Gold medal – first place	2018 Edmonton	Elite
Gold medal – first place	2018 Gold Coast	Elite
Gold medal – first place	2017 Hamburg	Elite
Silver medal – second place	2018 Hamburg	Elite
Silver medal – second place	2016 Hamburg	Elite
Bronze medal – third place	2019 Hamburg	Elite
ITU Triathlon World Cup

Jacob Birtwhistle (born 4 January 1995) is an Australian triathlete.

== Running career ==
At the 2013 IAAF World Cross Country Championships – Junior men's race he finished 41st.

He was crowned World School Cross Country Champion in 2012 in Malta. Throughout 2009-2012 he won 11 Australian junior athletics champion titles in 1500m, 3000m and 2000m steeple. In 2013, he transitioned to Triathlon but still managed to win the much-coveted Zatopec u/20 3000m title. In 2015, he was runner up in the Australian senior 10k Road Running Championships as a 20yr old.

== Duathlon career ==
Birtwhistle is a former duathlon junior world champion.

== Triathlon career ==
=== 2013 season ===
Australian Junior champion, Oceania junior champion, u/23 Australian sprint champion,

=== 2014 season ===
silver medallist World Junior Triathlon Championships

=== 2015 season ===
He won the Under-23 World Championship.

=== 2016 season ===
Birtwhistle finished fourth at the Yokohama event second at the Hamburg event of the 2016 ITU World Triathlon Series.

=== 2017 season ===
Birtwhistle finished second at the Hamburg and Edmonton events of the 2017 ITU World Triathlon Series.

=== 2018 season ===
Birtwhistle came second in a home Commonwealth Games on the Gold Coast, Australia. He was also a member of the gold winning Australian mixed relay team. In the 2018 ITU World Triathlon Series he took silver in Yokohama and bronze in Edmonton and Montréal. He completed the year with 7th at the 2018 ITU World Triathlon Grand Final, also on the Gold Coast. That saw him finish third overall in the 2018 ITU World Triathlon Series.

=== 2019 season ===
2019 saw Birtwhistle take his first gold at an ITU Triathlon World Series race, winning in Leeds (standard distance) and subsequently taking first place in Hamburg later that season (sprint distance).
