= Ryan Sissons =

New Zealand triathlete

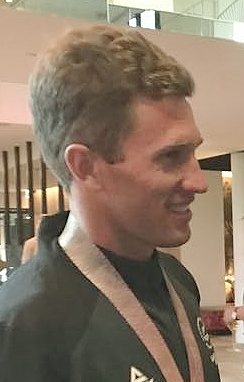
Sissons in 2018

Ryan Sissons (born 24 June 1988) is a New Zealand triathlete. Born in Bulawayo, Zimbabwe, Sissons moved to Auckland as a boy where he attended Macleans College. Sissons represented New Zealand at the 2012 London Olympics in the triathlon where he finished 33rd. At the 2014 Commonwealth Games, he finished in 13th in the individual event and was part of the New Zealand mixed relay team that finished in 5th. At the 2016 Summer Olympics, he finished in 17th. At the 2017 ITU World series in Hamburg, Ryan finished 3rd. At the age of 32, Ryan retired in 2020 after the Tokyo Olympic Games were postponed, with no guarantees that the games would go ahead in 2021.
