= List of Commonwealth Games medallists in triathlon =

This is the complete list of Commonwealth Games medallists in triathlon from 2002 to 2022.

== Medallists ==
=== Men's individual ===
Event	Gold	Silver	Bronze
2002	Simon Whitfield; Canada	Miles Stewart; Australia	Hamish Carter; New Zealand
2006	Brad Kahlefeldt; Australia	Bevan Docherty; New Zealand	Peter Robertson; Australia
2014	Alistair Brownlee; England	Jonny Brownlee; England	Richard Murray; South Africa
2018	Henri Schoeman; South Africa	Jacob Birtwhistle; Australia	Marc Austin; Scotland
2022	Alex Yee; England	Hayden Wilde; New Zealand	Matthew Hauser; Australia

=== Women's individual ===
Event	Gold	Silver	Bronze
2002	Carol Montgomery; Canada	Leanda Cave; Wales	Nicole Hackett; Australia
2006	Emma Snowsill; Australia	Samantha Warriner; New Zealand	Andrea Hewitt; New Zealand
2014	Jodie Stimpson; England	Kirsten Sweetland; Canada	Vicky Holland; England
2018	Flora Duffy; Bermuda	Jessica Learmonth; England	Joanna Brown; Canada
2022	Flora Duffy; Bermuda	Georgia Taylor-Brown; England	Beth Potter; Scotland

=== Mixed relay ===
Event	Gold	Silver	Bronze
2014	England; Vicky Holland; Jonny Brownlee; Jodie Stimpson; Alistair Brownlee	South Africa; Kate Roberts; Henri Schoeman; Gillian Sanders; Richard Murray	Australia; Emma Moffatt; Aaron Royle; Emma Jackson; Ryan Bailie
2018	Australia; Gillian Backhouse; Matthew Hauser; Ashleigh Gentle; Jacob Birtwhistle	England; Vicky Holland; Jonny Brownlee; Jessica Learmonth; Alistair Brownlee	New Zealand; Nicole van der Kaay; Ryan Sissons; Andrea Hewitt; Tayler Reid
2022	England; Alex Yee; Sophie Coldwell; Samuel Dickinson; Georgia Taylor-Brown	Wales; Iestyn Harrett; Olivia Mathias; Dominic Coy; Non Stanford	Australia; Jacob Birtwhistle; Natalie Van Coevorden; Matthew Hauser; Sophie Linn

=== Men's PTVI ===
Event	Gold	Silver	Bronze
2022	David Ellis; England; Guide : Luke Pollard	Sam Harding; Australia; Guide : Luke Harvey	Jonathan Goerlach; Australia; Guide : David Mainwaring

=== Women's PTVI ===
Event	Gold	Silver	Bronze
2022	Katie Crowhurst; England; Guide : Jessica Fullagar	Chloe MacCombe; Northern Ireland; Guide : Catherine A Sands	Jessica Tuomela; Canada; Guide : Emma Skaug

=== Men's PTWC ===
Event	Gold	Silver	Bronze
2018	Joe Townsend; England	Nic Beveridge; Australia	Bill Chaffey; Australia

=== Women's PTWC ===
Event	Gold	Silver	Bronze
2018	Jade Jones; England	Emily Tapp; Australia	Lauren Parker; Australia
