= Triathlon at the Commonwealth Games =

Triathlon is one of the sports at the quadrennial Commonwealth Games competition. It was first granted Commonwealth Games sport status in 2002, and has been held in each edition since, except in Delhi 2010 Games due to the lack of suitable venue for the swimming leg in Delhi. Until 2022, it was a core sport which had to be included in each competition's sporting programme. Para-triathlon was first included as an optional sport in the Gold Coast 2018 games. Triathlon will not be contested at the 2026 Commonwealth Games in Glasgow, Scotland.

Currently there are five triathlon events in the Commonwealth Games.

Individual events are held for men and women and have been since the sport's introduction in 2002, while a mixed team relay has been on the programme since 2014.

Additionally, as part of its program of integrating parasport into the Commonwealth Games, two paratriathlon events were included in the 2018 Games in Gold Coast, Australia. These events, one for each sex, where wheelchair paratriathlon events ('PTW1' and 'PTW2' classifications) using a multiple start format to ensure fairness across different wheelchair classes. In the 2022 Games the paratriathlon events were retained, and were for athletes with visual impairments ('PTVI' classification).

At the 1990 Commonwealth Games at Auckland, Triathlon was a demonstration event; won by Erin Baker (women) and Rick Wells (men), both from New Zealand.

Flora Duffy of Bermuda is the only triathlete of either sex to win two individual gold medals, or to win gold medals in separate Games, while Alistair Brownlee. Jodie Stimpson and Alex Yee have each won two Commonwealth Games gold medals, one individual, one mixed relay, in a single Games. Alistair Brownlee, with two golds and one silver medal, is overall the most successful triathlete in Commonwealth Games history. Jacob Birtwhistle, Matthew Hauser, Jonny Brownlee and Vicky Holland have also won 3 medals, including at least one relay gold.

== Editions ==
Games	Year	Host city	Host country	Best nation	Events
XV	1990	Auckland	New Zealand	New Zealand	2
XVII	2002	Manchester	England	Canada	2
XVIII	2006	Melbourne, Victoria	Australia	Australia	2
XX	2014	Glasgow	Scotland	England	3
XXI	2018	Gold Coast, Queensland	Australia	England	5
XXII	2022	Birmingham	England	England	5

== Medalists ==
Men

Games	Gold	Silver	Bronze
1990	Rick Wells; New Zealand	Miles Stewart; Australia	Sean Foster; Australia
2002	Simon Whitfield; Canada	Miles Stewart; Australia	Hamish Carter; New Zealand
2006	Brad Kahlefeldt; Australia	Bevan Docherty; New Zealand	Peter Robertson; Australia
2014	Alistair Brownlee; England	Jonathan Brownlee; England	Richard Murray; South Africa
2018	Henri Schoeman; South Africa	Jacob Birtwhistle; Australia	Marc Austin; Scotland
2022	Alex Yee; England	Hayden Wilde; New Zealand	Matt Hauser; Australia

Women

Games	Gold	Silver	Bronze
1990	Erin Baker; New Zealand	Carol Montgomery; Canada	Liz Hepple; Australia
2002	Carol Montgomery; Canada	Leanda Cave; Wales	Nicole Hackett; Australia
2006	Emma Snowsill; Australia	Samantha Warriner; New Zealand	Andrea Hewitt; New Zealand
2014	Jodie Stimpson; England	Kirsten Sweetland; Canada	Vicky Holland; England
2018	Flora Duffy; Bermuda	Jessica Learmonth; England	Joanna Brown; Canada
2022	Flora Duffy; Bermuda	Georgia Taylor-Brown; England	Beth Potter; Scotland

Mixed team

Games	Gold	Silver	Bronze
2014	England; Vicky Holland; Jonathan Brownlee; Jodie Stimpson; Alistair Brownlee	South Africa; Kate Roberts; Henri Schoeman; Gillian Sanders; Richard Murray	Australia; Emma Moffatt; Aaron Royle; Emma Jackson; Ryan Bailie
2018	Australia; Gillian Backhouse; Matthew Hauser; Ashleigh Gentle; Jacob Birtwhistle	England; Vicky Holland; Jonny Brownlee; Jessica Learmonth; Alistair Brownlee	New Zealand; Nicole van der Kaay; Ryan Sissons; Andrea Hewitt; Tayler Reid
2022	England; Alex Yee; Sophie Coldwell; Sam Dickinson; Georgia Taylor-Brown	Wales; Iestyn Harrett; Olivia Mathias; Dominic Coy; Non Stanford	Australia; Jacob Birtwhistle; Natalie van Coevorden; Matthew Hauser; Sophie Linn

Paratriathlon men

Games	Gold	Silver	Bronze
2018 PTWC	Joe Townsend; England	Nic Beveridge; Australia	Bill Chaffey; Australia
2022 PTVI	David Ellis; England pilot : Luke Pollard	Sam Harding; Australia pilot : Luke Harvey	Jonathan Goerlach; Australia pilot : David Mainwaring

Paratriathlon women

Games	Gold	Silver	Bronze
2018 PTWC	Jade Jones; England	Emily Tapp; Australia	Lauren Parker; Australia
2022 PTVI	Katie Crowhurst; England; Guide: Jessica Fullagar	Chloe MacCombe; Northern Ireland; Guide: Catherine A Sands	Jessica Tuomela; Australia; Guide: Emma Skaug

== All-time medal table ==
Rank	Nation	Gold	Silver	Bronze	Total
1	England	9	4	2	15
2	Australia	3	6	9	18
3	New Zealand	2	3	3	8
4	Canada	2	2	2	6
5	Bermuda	2	0	0	2
6	South Africa	1	1	1	3
7	Wales	0	2	0	2
8	Northern Ireland	0	1	0	1
9	Scotland	0	0	2	2
Totals (9 entries)		19	19	19	57
