= African Triathlon Championships =

The African Triathlon Championships is an African Triathlon competition event held every year, the event organised by the African Triathlon Union.

== Winners' List ==
Year	Host	Men's Champion	Time	Women's Champion	Time
2026	Hurghada, Egypt	(Morocco) Jawad Abdelmoula	01h 51' 35"	(South Africa) Shanae Williams	02h 07' 18"
2025	Nelson Mandela Bay, South Africa	(Morocco) Jawad Abdelmoula	01h 47' 44"	(South Africa) Shanae Williams	02h 07' 32"
2024	Hurghada, Egypt	(Morocco) Merwann Abassi	01h 59' 39"	(South Africa) Vicky van der Merwe	02h 15' 02"
2023	Hurghada, Egypt	(South Africa) Jamie Riddle	00h 58' 16"	(South Africa) Vicky van der Merwe	01h 06' 14"
2022	Agadir, Morocco	(Morocco) Jawad Abdelmoula	01h 49' 25 "	(South Africa) Sarah-Jane Walker	02h 07' 17"
2021	Charm el-Cheikh, Egypt	(South Africa) Henri Schoeman	1h 48' 57"	(South Africa) Simone Ackermann	2h 16' 09"
2019	Shandrani, Mauritius	(South Africa) Wian Sullwald	1h 52' 9"	(South Africa) Gillian Sanders	2h 7' 40"
2018	Rabat, Morocco	(Morocco) Badr Siwane	1h 58' 10"	(South Africa) Gillian Sanders	2h 8' 8"
2017	Yasmine Hammamet, Tunisia	(Morocco) Badr Siwane	1h 52' 14"	(South Africa) Gillian Sanders	2h 1' 2"
2016	Buffalo City, South Africa	(South Africa) Henri Schoeman	2h 0' 48"	(South Africa) Mari Rabie	2h 15' 3"
2015	Charm el-Cheikh, Egypt	(South Africa) Henri Schoeman	1h 52' 17"	(South Africa) Gillian Sanders	2h 6' 34"
2014	Troutbeck, Zimbabwe	(South Africa) Henri Schoeman	2h 0' 15"	(South Africa) Gillian Sanders	2h 18' 18"
2013	Agadir, Morocco	(South Africa) Henri Schoeman	1h 54' 14"	(South Africa) Gillian Sanders	2h 10' 1"
2012	Morne Brabant, Mauritius	(South Africa) Richard Murray	1h 52' 52"	(South Africa) Gillian Sanders	2h 13' 7"
2011	Maputo, Mozambique	(South Africa) Richard Murray	1h 57' 43"	(South Africa) Kate Roberts	2h 14' 4"
2010	Durban, South Africa	(South Africa) Erhard Wolfaardt	1h 55' 12"	(South Africa) Kate Roberts	2h 8' 52"
2009	Durban, South Africa	(South Africa) Erhard Wolfaardt	1h 51' 13"	(South Africa) Andrea Steyn	2h 6' 27"
2008	Yasmine Hammamet, Tunisia	(South Africa) Hendrik De Villiers	1h 50' 53"	(South Africa) Mari Rabie	2h 4' 0"
2007	La Coco Beach, Mauritius	(South Africa) Hendrik De Villiers	1h 46' 53"	(South Africa) Kate Roberts	2h 4' 50"
2006	Nyanga, Zimbabwe	(South Africa) Erhard Wolfaardt	2h 8' 36"	(South Africa) Kate Roberts	2h 28' 38"
2005	KwaZulu-Natal, South Africa	(South Africa) Hendrik De Villiers	1h 52' 50"	(South Africa) Mari Rabie	2h 10' 44"
2004	Laanbang, South Africa	(South Africa) Conrad Stoltz	2h 5' 45"	(South Africa) Megan Hall	2h 22' 14"
2003	Swakopmund, Namibia	(South Africa) Conrad Stoltz	1h 47' 14"	(South Africa) Megan Hall	2h 6' 37"
2002	Port-Louis, Mauritius	(South Africa) Brad Storm	1h 58' 48"	(South Africa) Trudi Barnes	2h 11' 25"
2001	Port Elizabeth, South Africa	(South Africa) Conrad Stoltz	1h 56' 16"	(South Africa) Dominique Donner	2h 13' 48"
2000	Cape Town, South Africa	(South Africa) Conrad Stoltz	2h 1' 8"	(South Africa) Lizel Moore	2h 21' 25"
1999	Troutbeck, Zimbabwe	(South Africa) Simon Finch	2h 4' 13"	(South Africa) Lizel Moore	2h 18' 48"
1998	Swakopmund, Namibia	(South Africa) Conrad Stoltz	1h 50' 54"	(South Africa) Kim Carter	2h 7' 52"
1997	Mauritius	(South Africa) Glen Gore	1h 57' 49"	(South Africa) Kim Carter	2h 6' 44"
1995	Troutbeck, Zimbabwe	(South Africa) Conrad Stoltz	2h 6' 42"	(South Africa) Kim Carter	2h 23' 28"
1993	Gordon Bay, South Africa	(South Africa) Conrad Stoltz	1h 48' 19"	(South Africa) Hannele Steyn	2h 3' 34"

=== Ranking By Nations ===
Rankings
Rk	Nation	1st place, gold medalist(s)	2nd place, silver medalist(s)	3rd place, bronze medalist(s)	Total
1	South Africa	56	55	50	161
2	Morocco	6	2	5	12
3	Zimbabwe	0	3	4	7
4	Mauritius	0	2	1	3
5	Tunisia	0	1	0	1
6	Egypt	0	0	1	1

=== Mixed Relay ===
Mixed Relays record
Year	Host	Champions	Runner-up	Third
2019	Shandrani, Mauritius	South Africa	Zimbabwe	Tunisia
2021	Charm el-Cheikh, Egypt	Morocco	Egypt	South Africa
2022	Agadir, Morocco	South Africa	Morocco	Egypt
2023	Hurghada, Egypt	South Africa	Morocco	Algeria
2024	Hurghada, Egypt	Morocco	Algeria	Egypt
2025	Nelson Mandela Bay, South Africa	South Africa	Zimbabwe	Kenya
2026	Hurghada, Egypt	South Africa	Morocco	Mauritius

=== Ranking By Nations ===
Rankings
Rk	Nation	1st place, gold medalist(s)	2nd place, silver medalist(s)	3rd place, bronze medalist(s)	Total
1	South Africa	5	0	1	6
2	Morocco	2	3	0	5
3	Zimbabwe	0	2	0	2
4	Egypt	0	1	2	3
5	Algeria	0	1	1	2
6	Kenya	0	0	1	1
7	Tunisia	0	0	1	1

== African Duathlon Championship ==
Year	Host	Men's Champion	Women's Champion
2010	Bloemfontein, South Africa	(South Africa) Brand Du Plessis	(South Africa) Kate Roberts
2013	Potchefstroom, South Africa	(South Africa) Johannes Du Plessis	(South Africa) Andrea Steyn
2019	Le Cap, South Africa	(South Africa) Herculaas Cronje	(South Africa) Carlyn Fischer
2021	Windhoek, Namibia	(Namibia) Jean-Paul Burger	(Namibia) Risa Dreyer
2023	Hurghada, Egypt	(Algeria) Maamar Fethi Ghouti	(Egypt) Manal Ahmed
2024	Hurghada, Egypt	(Morocco) Mohamed Nemsi	(Egypt) Manal Ahmed
2025	El Galala, Egypt	(Morocco) Mohamed Nemsi	(Morocco) Ghizlane Assou
2026	Hurghada, Egypt	(Morocco) Mohamed Nemsi	(Morocco) Ghizlane Assou

== African Aquathlon Championship ==
Year	Host	Men's Champion	Women's Champion
2013	Charm el-Cheikh, Egypt	(Egypt) Mohanad Elshafei	(Egypt) Basmla Elsalamoney
2023	Charm el-Cheikh, Egypt	(Morocco) Badr Siwane	(Algeria) Kahina Mebarki
2024	Hurghada, Egypt	(Egypt) Youssef Ehab	(Egypt) Rahma Ahmed
2025	El Galala, Egypt	(Morocco) Jawad Abdelmoula	(Algeria) Lola Soukaina Zeroual
2026	Hurghada, Egypt	(Algeria) Naim Mokhfi	(Egypt) Shahd Walid

== African Sprint Triathlon Championships ==
Year	Host	Men's Champion	Time	Women's Champion	Time
2026	Blue Bay, Mauritius	(Morocco) Jawad Abdelmoula	52' 26"	(South Africa) Shanae Williams	1h 7' 20"
2025	El Galala, Egypt	(Morocco) Jawad Abdelmoula	56' 59"	(South Africa) Shanae Williams	1h 4' 16"
2024	Hurghada, Egypt	(Morocco) Mohamed Nemsi	54' 53"	(Egypt) Manal Ahmed	1h 21' 21"
2023	Blue Bay, Mauritius	(Morocco) Jawad Abdelmoula	54' 44"	(South Africa) Vicky van der Merwe	1h 1' 51"
2007	Richards Bay, South Africa	(South Africa) Wikus Weber	1h 3' 30"	(South Africa) Carla Germishuys	1h 11' 22"
