= Triathlon at the 2014 Commonwealth Games – Mixed relay =

Mixed relay Triathlon at the 2014 Commonwealth Games
- Venue: Strathclyde Country Park
- Date: 26 July 2014
- Competitors: 36 from 9 nations
- Winning time: 1:13:24

Medalists
gold medal	Vicky Holland; Jonathan Brownlee; Jodie Stimpson; Alistair Brownlee	England
silver medal	Kate Roberts; Henri Schoeman; Gillian Sanders; Richard Murray	South Africa
bronze medal	Emma Moffatt; Aaron Royle; Emma Jackson; Ryan Bailie	Australia

The mixed relay triathlon was part of the Triathlon at the 2014 Commonwealth Games program. The competition was held on 26 July 2014 at Strathclyde Country Park in Glasgow. This was the first time the event has been held at the Commonwealth Games.

== Competition format ==
Each team consisted of four athletes (two male and two female) and each had to cover a course of 250 metres (0.16 mi) swimming, 6 kilometres (3.7 mi) road bicycling, and 1.6 kilometres (0.99 mi) road running.

== Results ==
Rank	Team	Triathletes	Individual Time	Total time
1st place, gold medalist(s)	England	Vicky Holland; Jonathan Brownlee; Jodie Stimpson; Alistair Brownlee	18:59; 17:29; 19:20; 17:36	1:13:24
2nd place, silver medalist(s)	South Africa	Kate Roberts; Henri Schoeman; Gillian Sanders; Richard Murray	19:24; 17:29; 19:18; 18:02	1:14:13
3rd place, bronze medalist(s)	Australia	Emma Moffatt; Aaron Royle; Emma Jackson; Ryan Bailie	19:29; 17:22; 19:17; 18:04	1:14:14
4	Canada	Kirsten Sweetland; Matthew Sharpe; Sarah-Anne Brault; Andrew Yorke	18:54; 17:58; 19:19; 18:06	1:14:17
5	New Zealand	Andrea Hewitt; Tony Dodds; Nicky Samuels; Ryan Sissons	18:59; 17:45; 19:13; 18:45	1:14:42
6	Northern Ireland	Aileen Reid; Conor Murphy; Eimear Mullan; Russell White	18:59; 17:48; 20:14; 18:51	1:15:52
7	Scotland	Natalie Milne; Grant Sheldon; Seonaid Thompson; David McNamee	19:24; 18:27; 21:11; 18:48	1:17:50
8	Wales	Carol Bridge; Liam Lloyd; Holly Lawrence; Morgan Davies	20:21; 18:37; 19:54; 19:01	1:17:53
9	Mauritius	Fabienne St Louis; Boris Toulet; Emilie Ng Foong Po; Boris De Chazal	21:11; 20:00; 22:12; 21:38	1:25:01
