= Triathlon at the 2014 Commonwealth Games – Women's =

Women's Triathlon at the 2014 Commonwealth Games
- Venue: Strathclyde Country Park
- Date: 24 July 2014
- Competitors: 24 from 12 nations
- Winning time: 1:58:56

Medalists
gold medal	Jodie Stimpson	England
silver medal	Kirsten Sweetland	Canada
bronze medal	Vicky Holland	England

The women's triathlon was part of the Triathlon at the 2014 Commonwealth Games program. The competition was held on 24 July 2014 at Strathclyde Country Park in Glasgow.

== Competition format ==
The race was held over the "international distance" (also called "Olympic distance") and consisted of 1,500 metres (0.93 mi) swimming, 40 kilometres (25 mi) road bicycling, and 10 kilometres (6.2 mi) road running.

== Results ==
A total of 24 athletes participated. Jodie Stimpson won the gold medal.

Rank	#	Triathlete	Swimming	Cycling	Running	Total time	Difference
1st place, gold medalist(s)	1	Jodie Stimpson (ENG)	19:37	1:04:01	34:21	1:58:56	-
2nd place, silver medalist(s)	6	Kirsten Sweetland (CAN)	19:53	1:03:41	34:26	1:59:01	+0:05
3rd place, bronze medalist(s)	10	Vicky Holland (ENG)	19:35	1:04:00	34:37	1:59:11	+0:15
4	2	Andrea Hewitt (NZL)	19:47	1:03:44	34:51	1:59:25	+0:29
5	4	Emma Jackson (AUS)	19:57	1:03:39	34:58	1:59:34	+0:38
6	5	Aileen Reid (NIR)	19:39	1:03:57	35:11	1:59:46	+0:50
7	3	Emma Moffatt (AUS)	19:43	1:03:50	36:55	2:01:31	+2:35
8	18	Flora Duffy (BER)	19:45	1:03:52	37:40	2:02:18	+3:22
9	8	Ashleigh Gentle (AUS)	20:24	1:06:14	35:43	2:03:24	+4:28
10	9	Nicky Samuels (NZL)	19:39	1:03:55	39:16	2:03:52	+4:56
11	15	Lucy Hall (ENG)	19:33	1:04:03	40:36	2:05:13	+6:17
12	14	Kate McIlroy (NZL)	20:23	1:06:10	38:40	2:06:20	+7:24
13	12	Gillian Sanders (RSA)	20:59	1:10:41	38:19	2:11:01	+12:05
14	17	Kate Roberts (RSA)	19:49	1:11:48	39:04	2:11:45	+12:49
15	26	Danica Bonello Spiteri (MLT)	22:55	1:14:15	42:57	2:21:14	+22:18
16	20	Fabienne St Louis (MRI)	24:07	1:13:05	43:43	2:22:00	+23:04
	11	Sarah-Anne Brault (CAN)	20:59	1:10:40	Did not finish		
	16	Ellen Pennock (CAN)	19:51	Did not finish			
	22	Emilie Ng Foong Po (MRI)	24:08	LAP			
	30	Jessie de Boer (KEN)	27:37	LAP			
	28	Emma Sharkey (NIR)	Did not finish				
	23	Elisabeth Mondon (JAM)	LAP				
	27	Rachael Sapera James (PNG)	LAP				
	24	Hanifa Said (KEN)	Did not finish				
