= Triathlon at the 2014 Commonwealth Games =

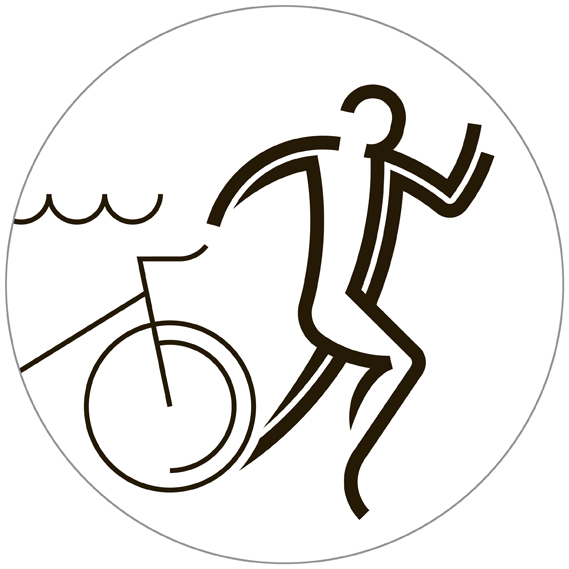
- Venue: Strathclyde Country Park
- Dates: 24–26 July 2014

The Triathlon competitions at the 2014 Commonwealth Games, in Glasgow, were held in Strathclyde Country Park. The men's and women's individual events were held on Thursday 24 July and women's triathlon was the first medal event of the Games. Mixed team relay was held on Saturday 26 July for the first time ever in major multi-sport Games. Marisol Casado, ITU President and IOC member, commented: "We are delighted the Glasgow 2014 Organising Committee has embraced the Triathlon Mixed Relay. Triathlon is on currently on a high in the United Kingdom, and the Mixed Relay will offer an extra opportunity for the people of Glasgow to watch another thrilling and unpredictable event live on their city streets."

England dominated the competition, taking all three titles, and five medals in total. Alistair Brownlee and Jodie Stimpson won two gold medals each. The victory for Brownlee meant that he had won all senior international titles available to him : the Olympic, World, European and Commonwealth titles for triathlon.

== Format ==
The Triathlon events at the XX Commonwealth Games were conducted under the ITU Competition Rules and in accordance with the Commonwealth Games Federation (CGF) Constitution.

The men's and women's individual events were at distance - 1.5 km (0.93 mi) swim, 40 km (25 mi) cycle, and a 10 km (6.2 mi) run. The competitions took place as single events between all competitors with no heats.

The mixed relay was contested at the Commonwealth Games for the first time. This event was contested by teams of two men and two women who each complete a 250m swim, 6 km bike and 1600m run leg before passing on to the next athlete in the team. Race order: women-man-women-man.

== Competition venue ==
On the south eastern edge of Glasgow, Strathclyde Country Park provided an excellent venue for Triathlon. This attractive course, using the loch for swimming and the surrounding network of roads and paths for the cycling and running phases, was already an established national triathlon venue.

Individual race course

swim course – 1,500m. The swim took place in the Strathclyde Loch on a course consisting of two laps of 750m.

bike course – 40 km. The bike course consisted of five laps of an 8 km course.

run course – 10 km. The run course consisted of three laps of 3.33 km each and used part of the bike course.

Mixed Relay course

swim course – 250m. The swim took place in the Strathclyde Loch on a course consisting of one lap.

bike course – 6 km. The bike course consisted of one lap of a 6 km course.

run course – 1.6 km. The run course consisted of two laps.

== Schedule ==
All times are British Summer Time (UTC+1). All event times are subject to change.

Date	Time	Round
24 July 2014	11:00	Women's Individual
24 July 2014	15:00	Men's Individual
26 July 2014	12:30	Mixed Relay

== Medal summary ==
Event	Gold	Silver	Bronze
Men's individual	Alistair Brownlee; England	Jonathan Brownlee; England	Richard Murray; South Africa
Women's individual	Jodie Stimpson; England	Kirsten Sweetland; Canada	Vicky Holland; England
Mixed Relay	England; Vicky Holland; Jonathan Brownlee; Jodie Stimpson; Alistair Brownlee	South Africa; Kate Roberts; Henri Schoeman; Gillian Sanders; Richard Murray	Australia; Emma Moffatt; Aaron Royle; Emma Jackson; Ryan Bailie

== Medal table ==
Rank	Nation	Gold	Silver	Bronze	Total
1	England	3	1	1	5
2	South Africa	0	1	1	2
3	Canada	0	1	0	1
4	Australia	0	0	1	1
Totals (4 entries)		3	3	3	9
