= Triathlon at the 2022 Commonwealth Games – Qualification =

There was a nominal total of 20 quota places available (in parasport events only) for triathlon at the 2022 Commonwealth Games; 10 each for men and women.

== Rules ==
Each Commonwealth Games Association (CGA) may qualify up to three places per event, which equates to a maximum quota of six. Nine places per event are determined by the World Triathlon Para Rankings (as of 28 March 2022), with the last spot reserved for a Bipartite Invitation.

All those who qualify are entitled to compete with a guide, which has no impact on quota allocation.

== Timeline ==
Event	Dates	Location
World Triathlon Para Rankings	30 March 2020 – 27 March 2022	Various locations

== Events ==
Men's PTVI

Means of qualification	Quotas	Qualified
World Ranking	9	Jonathan Goerlach (AUS); Gerrard Gosens (AUS); Dave Ellis (ENG); Oscar Kelly (ENG); Oliver Gunning (NIR); David Jones (RSA); Gavin Kilpatrick (RSA); Rhys Jones (WAL); Sam Harding (AUS)
Wildcard	1	Iain Dawson (ENG)
TOTAL	10	

Women's PTVI

Means of qualification	Quotas	Qualified
World Ranking	8	Jessica Tuomela (CAN); Katie Crowhurst (ENG); Melissa Reid (ENG); Chloe MacCombe (NIR); Linsay Engelbrecht (RSA); Alison Peasgood (SCO); Erica Burleigh (AUS); Judith MacCombe (NIR)
Wildcard	0	
TOTAL	8	
