= Triathlon at the 2022 Commonwealth Games =

- Venue: Sutton Park
- Dates: 29–31 July 2022
- Nations: 29

Triathlon was one of the sports contested at the 2022 Commonwealth Games, held in Birmingham, England. This was the fifth staging of triathlon at the Commonwealth Games since the sport's debut in 2002, and the second staging within England specifically.

The competition took place on 29 and 31 July 2022, spread across five events (including two parasport events).

As in the last Games, the event was held over the 'sprint' format, a format that was created for venues and places that cannot fully use the Olympic distance. Therefore, this competition did not award points towards the Olympic and Paralympic classification for Paris 2024. The sprint format consisted of a parcours of half of 'Olympic'/'Standard' distances; a 750 metre swim, a 20 kilometre bike ride and a 5 kilometre run.

The mixed relay was four 'super-sprint' legs of slightly different distances than in 2018 format: a 300 metre swim, a 5 kilometre bike leg and a 2 kilometre run.

In 2022, the paralympic class chosen for the two paratriathlon events was the visually impaired PTVI classifications, replacing the PTWC events (wheelchair at the both men's and women's events from 2018. This means all the legs will be conducted with a sighted guide which also served as the tandem pilot at the cycling leg.

== Schedule ==
The competition schedule is as follows:

Date Event	Fri 29	Sun 31
Men's	F	
Women's	F	
Mixed relay		F
Men's PTVI		F
Women's PTVI		F

== Venue ==
The triathlons will be held along courses that circulate through Sutton Park and Sutton Coldfield.

== Qualification (parasport) ==
A total of 20 paratriathletes (10 per gender) nominally qualify to compete at the Games. They qualify for each event as follows:

- Paratriathletes on the World Triathlon Para Rankings.
- Recipient of a CGF / World Triathlon Bipartite Invitation.

== Medal summary ==
=== Medal table ===
* Host nation (England)

Rank	Team	Gold	Silver	Bronze	Total
1	England*	4	1	0	5
2	Bermuda	1	0	0	1
3	Australia	0	1	3	4
4	New Zealand	0	1	0	1
4	Northern Ireland	0	1	0	1
4	Wales	0	1	0	1
7	Canada	0	0	1	1
7	Scotland	0	0	1	1
Totals (8 entries)		5	5	5	15

=== Medalists ===
Event	Gold	Silver	Bronze
Men's	Alex Yee; England	Hayden Wilde; New Zealand	Matt Hauser; Australia
Women's	Flora Duffy; Bermuda	Georgia Taylor-Brown; England	Beth Potter; Scotland
Mixed relay	England; Alex Yee; Sophie Coldwell; Sam Dickinson; Georgia Taylor-Brown	Wales; Iestyn Harrett; Olivia Mathias; Dominic Coy; Non Stanford	Australia; Jacob Birtwhistle; Natalie van Coevorden; Matthew Hauser; Sophie Linn
Men's PTVI	David Ellis (ENG); Guide : Luke Pollard	Sam Harding (AUS); Guide : Luke Harvey	Jonathan Goerlach (AUS); Guide : David Mainwaring
Women's PTVI	Katie Crowhurst (ENG); Guide : Jessica Fullagar	Chloe MacCombe (NIR); Guide : Catherine A Sands	Jessica Tuomela (CAN); Guide : Emma Skaug
