= Jamie Riddle =

South African triathlete

Personal information
- Born: 2000 (age 25–26) Port Elizabeth, South Africa
- Height: 1.83 m (6 ft 0 in)

Sport
- Country: South Africa
- Sport: Triathlon
- Coached by: Mikal Iden
Medal record
Men's triathlon
Representing South Africa
2016 ITU World Triathlon Series
Gold medal – first place	ITU Grand Final	Triathlon
African Triathlon Championships
Gold medal – first place	2023 Swakopmund	Individual
Silver medal – second place	2022 Agadir	Individual
Silver medal – second place	2021 Sharm el-Sheij	Individual

Jamie Riddle (born 2000) is a South African triathlete. He attended Grey High School in Port Elizabeth, and later moved to Paul Roos Gymnasium in Stellenbosch.

He competed in the individual and mixed relay events at the 2022 Commonwealth Games, finishing 6th in the former. That year, he was also the overall swim discipline winner of the Super League Triathlon.

The following year, he won the African Triathlon Championships, held in Hurghada, Egypt. In 2024, he qualified for the men's triathlon at the 2024 Summer Olympics based on his world ranking.
