= Megan Hall =

Megan Hall may refer to:

- Megan Hall (triathlete)
- Megan Hall (poet)
