= Triathlon at the 2022 Commonwealth Games – Women's PTVI =

Sporting event

Women's triathlon PTVI at the 2022 Commonwealth Games
- Venue: Sutton Park, West Midlands
- Date: 31 July 2022
- Competitors: 7 from 6 nations
- Winning time: 1:10:32

Medalists
gold medal	Katie Crowhurst; Guide: Jessica Fullagar	England
silver medal	Chloe MacCombe; Guide: Catherine A Sands	Northern Ireland
bronze medal	Jessica Tuomela; Guide: Emma Skaug	Canada

The women's PTVI triathlon was part of the triathlon at the 2022 Commonwealth Games program. The paratriathlon was held on 31 July 2022 in Sutton Park near Sutton Coldfield, West Midlands, England. The event featured nine triathletes from six nations, and nine sighted guides. This was the second women's paratriathlon at the Commonwealth Games, and the first for athletes with a visual impairment.

== Schedule ==
All times are British Summer Time

Date	Time	Round
Sunday 31 July 2022	09:31	Final race

== Competition format ==
The race was held over sprint distance and consisted of swimming, road bicycling, and road running. Triathletes were selected on the basis of World Triathlon paratriathlon PTVI rankings, with one quota held over for the bipartite invitation process, awarded to Juliet Mwongeli of Kenya, though ultimately she did not contest the race.

== Results ==
Rank	Triathlete	Class	Comp	Swimming	T1	Cycling	T2	Running	Total time	Diff
1st place, gold medalist(s)	Katie Crowhurst (ENG); Guide : Jessica Fullagar	PTVI	3:19	11:19	1:10	30:21	0:32	23:51	1:10:32	
2nd place, silver medalist(s)	Chloe MacCombe (NIR); Guide : Catherine A Sands	PTVI	3:19	14:52	1:44	32:37	0:43	21:23	1:14:39	+4:07
3rd place, bronze medalist(s)	Jessica Tuomela (CAN); Guide : Emma Skaug	PTVI	0:00	13:39	1:38	31:35	0:48	27:32	1:15:12	+4:40
4	Judith MacCombe (NIR); Guide : Anne Paul	PTVI	3:19	17:38	1:42	33:42	0:42	21:27	1:18:30	+7:58
5	Linsay Engelbrecht (RSA); Guide : Trish Heimann	PTVI	3:19	17:41	1:28	34:44	0:39	25:36	1:23:27	+12:55
6	Erica Burleigh (AUS); Guide : Felicity Cradick	PTVI	3:19	14:28	1:40	37:12	0:36	29:34	1:26:49	+16:17
DNF	Alison Peasgood (SCO); Guide : Hazel MacLeod	PTVI	3:19	11:27	1:24					
