= Sam Dickinson (triathlete) =

English triathlete (born 1997)

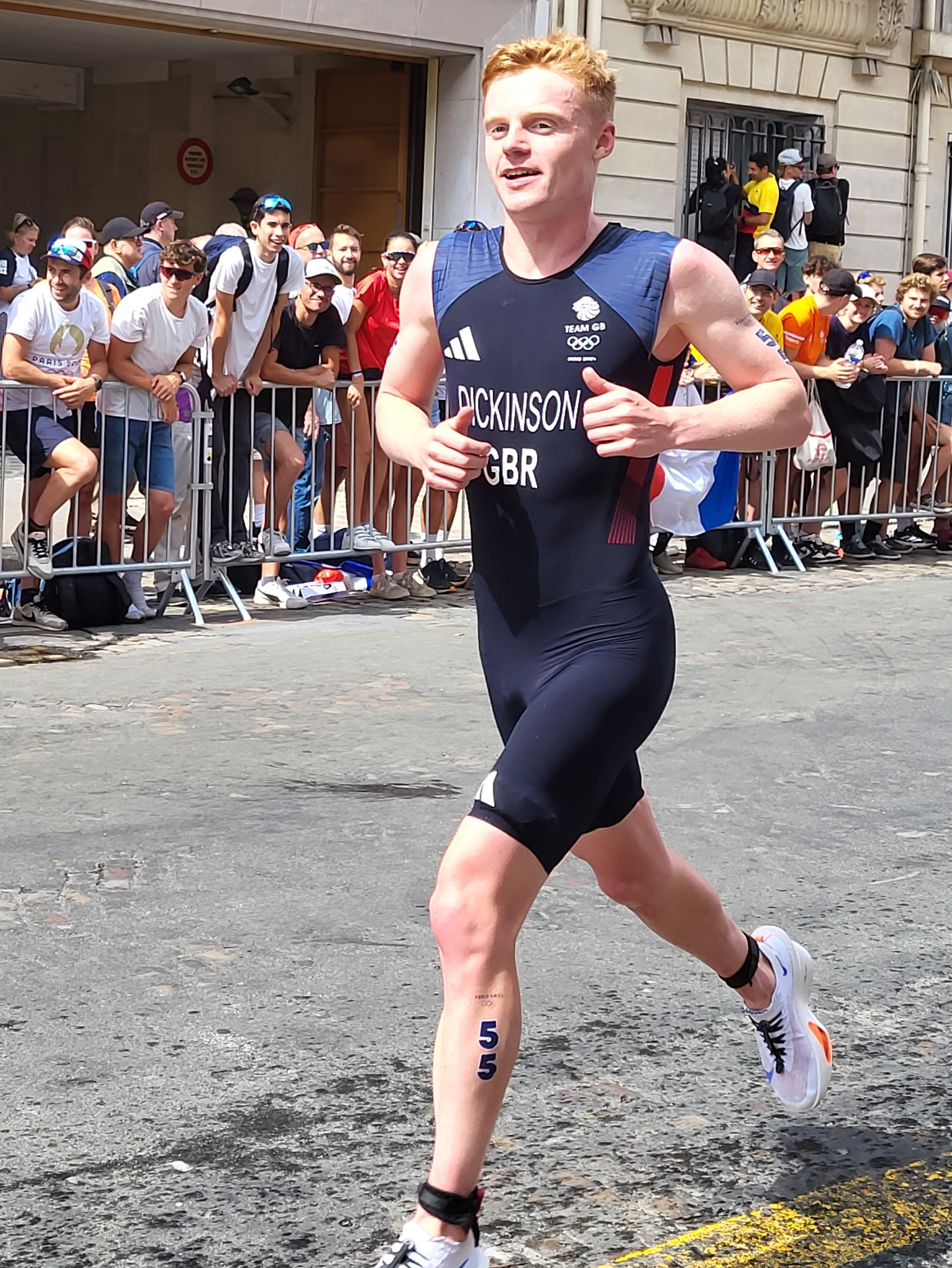
- Dickinson at the 2024 Summer Olympics

Personal information
- Full name: Samuel Dickinson
- Nationality: British (English)
- Born: 11 July 1997 (age 29) York, England

Sport
- Sport: Triathlon
Medal record
Men's triathlon
Representing Great Britain
Olympic Games
Bronze medal – third place	2024 Paris	Mixed relay
World Triathlon Mixed Relay Championships
Silver medal – second place	2022 Montréal	Mixed relay
Representing England
Commonwealth Games
Gold medal – first place	2022 Birmingham	Mixed relay

Samuel Dickinson (born 11 July 1997) is an English professional triathlete. He has represented England at the Commonwealth Games, where he won a gold medal.

== Early life ==
Educated at St Peter's School, York, he graduated from the University of Leeds with a Bachelor of Science (BSc) in Sports Science and Physiology.

Dickinson won a silver medal as part of the British team that won the mixed relay at the 2022 World Triathlon Mixed Relay Championships in Montreal.

== Career ==
In 2022, he was selected for the 2022 Commonwealth Games in Birmingham where he competed in men's event, finishing in 19th place. However as part of the mixed relay team he won a gold medal in the mixed relay event, where he was joined by Alex Yee, Sophie Coldwell and Georgia Taylor-Brown in the winning team.
