= 2016 Ironman 70.3 World Championship =

International triathlon competition

Ironman 70.3 World Championship
- Location: Mooloolaba, Queensland
- Date: September 4, 2016

Champions
- Men: (Australia) Timothy Reed
- Women: (United Kingdom) Holly Lawrence

The 2016 Ironman 70.3 World Championship was a triathlon competition held in Mooloolaba, Queensland, of Australia's Sunshine Coast on September 4, 2016. It was won by Tim Reed of Australia and Holly Lawrence of Great Britain. The championship was organized by the World Triathlon Corporation (WTC) and was the culmination of the Ironman 70.3 series of events that occurred from July 19, 2015 through July 3, 2016. Athletes, both professional and amateur, earned a spot in the championship race by qualifying in races throughout the 70.3 series. A prize purse of $250,000 was distributed to the top 10 male and female professional athletes. The championship location marked the first time the event was held in the southern hemisphere.

== Championship results ==
=== Men ===
Pos.	Time (h:mm:ss)	Name	Country	Split times (h:mm:ss)				
Pos.	Time (h:mm:ss)	Name	Country	Swim	T1	Bike	T2	Run
Gold medal	3:44:14	Timothy Reed	Australia	22:53	2:14	2:06:12	1:52	1:11:03
Silver medal	3:44:16	Sebastian Kienle	Germany	24:14	2:11	2:04:45	1:48	1:11:18
Bronze medal	3:44:40	Ruedi Wild	Switzerland	22:47	2:21	2:06:28	1:57	1:11:07
4	3:45:52	Terenzo Bozzone	New Zealand	22:44	2:11	2:06:20	1:53	1:12:44
5	3:46:02	Sam Appleton	Australia	22:40	2:17	2:06:23	1:51	1:12:51
6	3:46:21	Nicholas Kastelein	Australia	22:43	2:15	2:06:41	1:56	1:12:46
7	3:46:32	Tim Don	United Kingdom	22:51	2:10	2:06:37	1:57	1:12:57
8	3:46:47	Maurice Clavel	Germany	22:53	2:11	2:06:18	1:46	1:13:39
9	3:47:14	Lionel Sanders	Canada	25:41	2:15	2:06:42	2:02	1:10:34
10	3:47:28	Craig Alexander	Australia	22:49	2:05	2:06:39	1:52	1:14:03

=== Women ===
Pos.	Time (h:mm:ss)	Name	Country	Split times (h:mm:ss)				
Pos.	Time (h:mm:ss)	Name	Country	Swim	T1	Bike	T2	Run
Gold medal	4:09:12	Holly Lawrence	United Kingdom	23:24	2:17	2:19:28	2:15	1:21:48
Silver medal	4:11:09	Melissa Hauschildt	Australia	26:46	2:33	2:21:06	2:01	1:18:43
Bronze medal	4:13:36	Heather Wurtele	Canada	25:05	2:29	2:22:26	1:58	1:21:38
4	4:14:09	Daniela Ryf	Switzerland	24:12	2:34	2:23:47	2:17	1:21:19
5	4:17:16	Caroline Steffen	Switzerland	24:13	2:41	2:23:09	2:03	1:25:10
6	4:17:26	Annabel Luxford	Australia	24:11	2:31	2:23:44	2:02	1:24:58
7	4:17:40	Laura Philipp	Germany	27:16	2:30	2:24:46	2:08	1:21:00
8	4:17:53	Alicia Kaye	United States	24:17	2:22	2:23:31	2:08	1:25:35
9	4:18:17	Radka Vodičková	Czech Republic	24:10	2:35	2:26:51	2:04	1:22:37
10	4:18:19	Magali Tisseyre	Canada	24:16	2:30	2:23:49	2:08	1:25:36

== Qualification ==
The 2016 Ironman 70.3 Series featured 87 events that enabled qualification to the 2015 World Championship event. Professional triathletes qualified for the championship race by competing in races during the qualifying period, earning points towards their pro rankings. For the 2016 championship race that period was August 2, 2015 to July 3, 2016. An athlete's five highest scoring races were counted toward their pro rankings. The top 50 males and top 35 females in the pro rankings qualified for the championship race. The previous five 70.3 champions received an automatic qualifying spot provided they validate their entry by competitively finishing one qualifying race. Winners of the five regional 70.3 championships also automatically qualified for the championship race. These winners did not count towards the final 50 and 35 qualifiers Professional athletes were also eligible for prize purses at each qualifying event, which ranged in total size from $75,000 to $100,000.

Amateur triathletes could qualify for the championship race by earning a qualifying slot at one of the qualifying events. At qualifying events, slots were allocated to each age group category, male and female, with the number of slots given out based on that category's proportional representation of the overall field. Each age group category was tentatively allocated one qualifying spot in each qualifying event. Some 70.3 events also served as qualifiers for the military and handcycle divisions into the full Ironman World Championships in Hawaii.

=== Qualifying Ironman 70.3 events ===
Date	Event	Location
Jul 19, 2015	Ironman 70.3 Racine	(United States) Racine, Wisconsin
Jul 26, 2015	Ironman 70.3 Calgary	Calgary, Alberta, Canada
Aug 2, 2015	Ironman 70.3 Philippines	Cebu, Philippines
Aug 2, 2015	Ironman 70.3 Durban	Durban, South Africa
Aug 9, 2015	Ironman 70.3 European Regional Championship^{m}	Wiesbaden, Germany
Aug 9, 2015	Ironman 70.3 Steelhead^{X}	(United States) Benton Harbor, Michigan
Aug 9, 2015	Ironman 70.3 Gdynia	Gdynia, Poland
Aug 9, 2015	Ironman 70.3 Dublin	(Republic of Ireland) Dublin, Ireland
Aug 9, 2015	Ironman 70.3 Ecuador	Manta, Ecuador
Aug 16, 2015	Ironman 70.3 Lake Stevens^{X}	(United States) Lake Stevens, Washington
Aug 16, 2015	Ironman 70.3 Timberman	(United States) Gilford, New Hampshire
Aug 22, 2015	Ironman 70.3 Budapest	Budapest, Hungary
Aug 23, 2015	Ironman 70.3 Bintan	Bintan, Indonesia
Aug 29, 2015	Ironman 70.3 Vichy	Vichy, France
Aug 29, 2015	Ironman 70.3 Brasil-Paraguay	Foz do Iguaçu, Brazil
Aug 29, 2015	Ironman 70.3 Zell Am See	Zell am See-Kaprun, Austria
Sep 13, 2015	Ironman 70.3 Sunshine Coast	(Australia) Sunshine Coast, Queensland
Sep 13, 2015	Ironman 70.3 Santa Cruz^{X}	(United States) Santa Cruz, California
Sep 13, 2015	Ironman 70.3 Rugen	Binz, Germany
Sep 13, 2015	Ironman 70.3 Aarhus^{X}	Aarhus, Denmark
Sep 19, 2015	Ironman 70.3 Lanzarote	Lanzarote, Spain
Sep 20, 2015	Ironman 70.3 Incheon	(South Korea) Incheon, Korea
Sep 20, 2015	Ironman 70.3 Cozumel	Cozumel, Mexico
Sep 20, 2015	Ironman 70.3 Lake Tahoe^{X}	(United States) Lake Tahoe, California
Sep 20, 2015	Ironman 70.3 Pula^{X}	Pula, Croatia
Sep 27, 2015	Ironman 70.3 Augusta^{X}	(United States) Augusta, Georgia
Sep 27, 2015	Ironman 70.3 Superfrog^{m X}	(United States) Coronado, California
Oct 4, 2015	Ironman 70.3 Gurye	Gurye, South Korea
Oct 4, 2015	Ironman 70.3 Rio de Janeiro	Rio de Janeiro, Brazil
Oct 4, 2015	Ironman 70.3 Silverman	(United States) Henderson, Nevada
Oct 18, 2015	Ironman 70.3 Port Macquarie	(Australia) Port Macquarie, New South Wales
Oct 18, 2015	Ironman 70.3 Tempe^{X}	(United States) Tempe, Arizona
Oct 25, 2015	Ironman 70.3 Turkey	Belek, Turkey
Oct 25, 2015	Ironman 70.3 Miami	(United States) Miami, Florida
Oct 25, 2015	Ironman 70.3 Los Cabos	Los Cabos, Mexico
Nov 1, 2015	Ironman 70.3 Taiwan	Hengchun, Taiwan
Nov 8, 2015	Ironman 70.3 Mandurah	Mandurah, Western Australia
Nov 8, 2015	Ironman 70.3 Austin	(United States) Austin, Texas
Nov 29, 2015	Ironman 70.3 Western Sydney	(Australia) Sydney, New South Wales
Nov 29, 2015	Ironman 70.3 Punta del Este	Punta del Este, Uruguay
Dec 5, 2015	Ironman 70.3 Middle East Championship	Manama, Bahrain
Dec 12, 2015	Ironman 70.3 Taupo	Taupō, New Zealand
Dec 13, 2015	Ironman 70.3 Ballarat	(Australia) Ballarat, Victoria
Jan 10, 2016	Ironman 70.3 Pucon	Pucón, Chile
Jan 24, 2016	Ironman 70.3 South Africa	Buffalo City, South Africa
Jan 29, 2016	Ironman 70.3 Dubai	(United Arab Emirates) Dubai, UAE
Jan 31, 2016	Ironman 70.3 Pan American Pro Championship	Panama City, Panama
Feb 7, 2016	Ironman 70.3 Geelong	(Australia) Geelong, Victoria
Mar 6, 2016	Ironman 70.3 Subic Bay	Subic Bay, Philippines
Mar 6, 2016	Ironman 70.3 Buenos Aires	Buenos Aires, Argentina
Mar 20, 2016	Ironman 70.3 Puerto Rico	San Juan, Puerto Rico
Mar 20, 2016	Ironman 70.3 Monterrey	Monterrey, Mexico
Mar 27, 2016	Ironman 70.3 Taiwan	Hengchun, Taiwan
Apr 2, 2016	Ironman 70.3 California	(United States) Oceanside, California
Apr 3, 2016	Ironman 70.3 Malaysia	Putrajaya, Malaysia
Apr 10, 2016	Ironman 70.3 South American Championship	Palmas, Brazil
Apr 10, 2016	Ironman 70.3 Florida^{X}	(United States) Haines City, Florida
Apr 10, 2016	Ironman 70.3 Texas	(United States) Galveston, Texas
Apr 17, 2016	Ironman 70.3 New Orleans	(United States) New Orleans, Louisiana
May 1, 2016	Ironman 70.3 Busselton	Busselton, Western Australia
May 1, 2016	Ironman 70.3 Aix En Provence	Aix-en-Provence, France
May 1, 2016	Ironman 70.3 St. Croix^{X}	(United States Virgin Islands) Saint Croix, U.S. Virgin Islands
May 7, 2016	Ironman 70.3 Mallorca	Alcudia, Mallorca, Spain
May 7, 2016	Ironman 70.3 North American Championship	(United States) St. George, Utah
May 8, 2016	Ironman 70.3 Vietnam	Da Nang, Vietnam
May 22, 2016	Ironman 70.3 Barcelona	Barcelona, Spain
May 22, 2016	Ironman 70.3 St. Polten	St. Pölten/Vienna, Austria
May 22, 2016	Ironman 70.3 Chattanooga	(United States) Chattanooga, Tennessee
Jun 4, 2016	Ironman 70.3 Hawaii^{X}	(United States) Kohala, Hawaii
Jun 5, 2016	Ironman 70.3 Raleigh	(United States) Raleigh, North Carolina
Jun 5, 2016	Ironman 70.3 Kraichgau	Kraichgau, Germany
Jun 5, 2016	Ironman 70.3 Switzerland	Rapperswil-Jona, Switzerland
Jun 11, 2016	Ironman 70.3 Boulder	(United States) Boulder, Colorado
Jun 12, 2016	Ironman 70.3 Cairns* ^{‡ X}	(Australia) Cairns, Queensland
Jun 12, 2016	Ironman 70.3 Japan	Tokoname, Aichi, Japan
Jun 12, 2016	Ironman 70.3 Eagleman	(United States) Cambridge, Maryland
Jun 12, 2016	Ironman 70.3 Victoria	(Canada) Victoria, British Columbia
Jun 12, 2016	Ironman 70.3 Staffordshire	Staffordshire, England
Jun 12, 2016	Ironman 70.3 Italy	Pescara,Italy
Jun 18, 2016	Ironman 70.3 Luxembourg* ^{‡}	Luxembourg
Jun 19, 2016	Ironman 70.3 Busan	Busan, South Korea
Jun 19, 2016	Ironman 70.3 Syracuse^{X}	(United States) Syracuse, New York
Jun 19, 2016	Ironman 70.3 Durban	Durban, South Africa
Jun 19, 2016	Ironman 70.3 Kronberg^{X}	Helsingør, Denmark
Jun 26, 2016	Ironman 70.3 Mont-Tremblant	(Canada) Mont-Tremblant, Quebec
Jun 26, 2016	Ironman 70.3 UK^{X}	(United States) Wimbleball, Exmoor, UK
Jun 26, 2016	Ironman 70.3 Coeur D'Alene	(United States) Coeur d'Alene, Idaho
Jun 26, 2016	Ironman 70.3 Buffalo Springs Lake* ^{‡ X}	(United States) Lubbock, Texas
Jul 3, 2016	Ironman 70.3 Norway	Haugesund, Norway

*Serves as a 2016 Ironman 70.3 World Championship handcycle qualifier.
^{‡}Serves as a 2016 Ironman World Championship handcycle qualifier
^{m}Serves as a military division 2016 Ironman World Championship qualifier
^{X}No professional points awarded.
