= Badr Siwane =

Moroccan triathlete

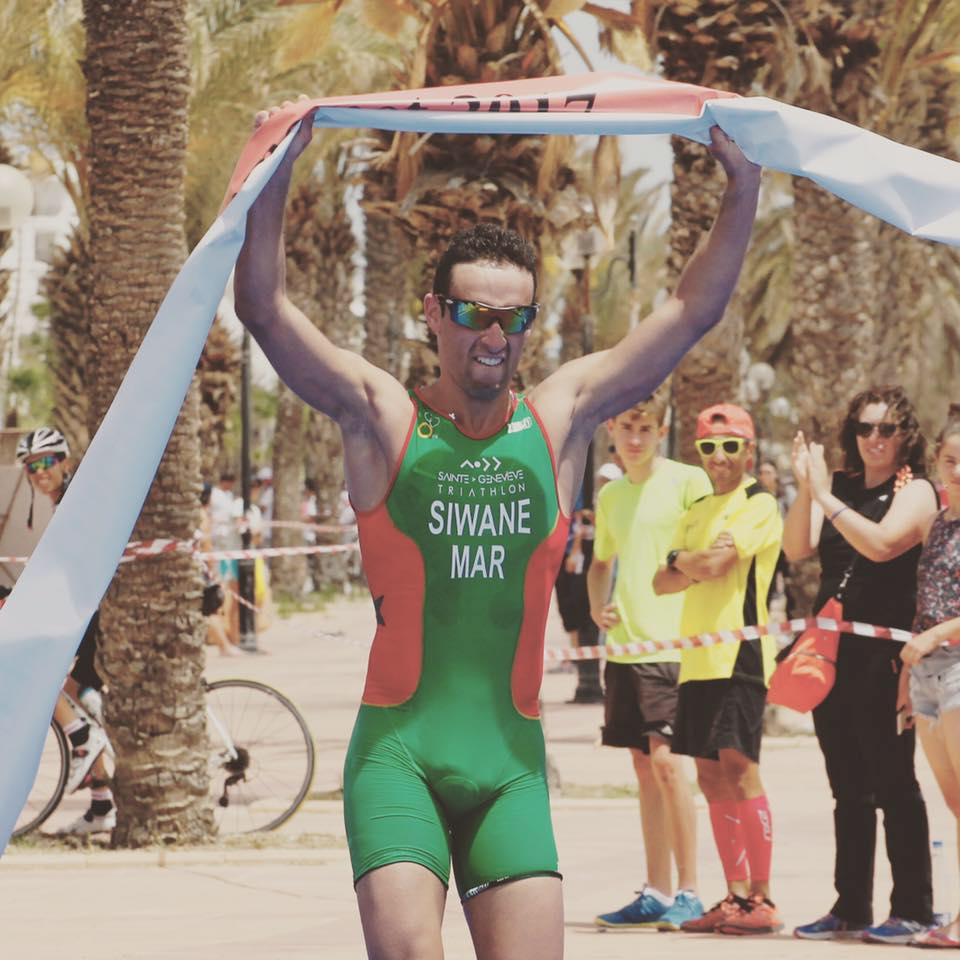
- Badr Siwane (2017)

Personal information
- Born: 1 January 1994 (age 32)

Sport
- Country: Morocco
- Sport: Triathlon
Medal record
Men's triathlon
Representing Morocco
African Games
Gold medal – first place	2019 Rabat	Elite
Silver medal – second place	2023 Accra	Elite
African Championships
Gold medal – first place	2017 Yasmine Hammamet	Elite
Gold medal – first place	2018 Rabat	Elite
Bronze medal – third place	2025 Nelson Mandela Bay	Elite

Badr Siwane (born 1 January 1994) is a Moroccan triathlete.

He was the men's winner at the 2017 and 2018 African Triathlon Championships.

He represented Morocco at the 2019 African Games held in Rabat, Morocco and he won the men's triathlon event. He won the silver medal in this event at the 2023 African Games held in Accra, Ghana.
