= Jawad Abdelmoula =

French-Moroccan triathlete

Personal information
- Born: 18 February 1994 (age 32) Angers, France

Sport
- Country: Morocco; France
- Sport: Triathlon
- Club: Poissy Triathlon
Medal record
Men's triathlon
Representing Morocco
World Championship Series
Bronze medal – third place	2022 Hamburg	Elite
African Championships
Gold medal – first place	2026 Hurghada	Elite
Gold medal – first place	2025 Nelson Mandela Bay	Elite
Gold medal – first place	2022 Agadir	Elite
Silver medal – second place	2026 Hurgada	Mixed relay
Silver medal – second place	2022 Agadir	Mixed relay
Bronze medal – third place	2023 Hurgada	Elite
African Sprint Championships
Gold medal – first place	2025 El Galala	Elite
Gold medal – first place	2023 Blue Bay	Elite

Jawad Abdelmoula (born 18 February 1994) is a French-Moroccan triathlete. He is a three time African continental champion, and competed at the 2024 Summer Olympics.

Born in Angers, France, Abdelmoula has represented Morocco in international competitions since 2021. He originally competed in swimming followed by running, recording personal bests of 28:39 in the 10K and 8:02.43 in the 3000 metres. He began competing in triathlons shortly before turning 25 while still working full time as a firefighter in Rennes. In 2022, he turned fully professional with the Poissy Triathlon club.
