= Vicky van der Merwe =

South African triathlete

Personal information
- Born: 1989 (age 36–37) Cape Town, South Africa
- Occupation: Triathlon

Sport
- Country: South Africa
Medal record
Representing South Africa
Triathlon
African Games
Gold medal – first place	2023 Accra	Triathlon individual
African Triathlon Championships
Gold medal – first place	2023 Hurghada	Triathlon individual
Gold medal – first place	2024 Hurghada	Triathlon individual

Vicky van der Merwe (born 1989) is a South African athlete who competes in triathlon. She won a gold medal at the 2023 African Games and three gold medals at the African Triathlon Championships, in 2023 and 2024. In 2024, she became an Olympian, representing South Africa at the XXXIII Olympic Games in Paris. She competed in the women's triathlon at the Olympics.
