= Triathlon at the 2019 African Games =

- Location: Rabat, Morocco
- Dates: 24 – 25 August 2019

Triathlon at the 2019 African Games was held on 24 and 25 August 2019 in Rabat, Morocco.

== Participating nations ==
- Algeria
- Egypt
- Mauritius
- Morocco
- Senegal
- Tunisia
- Zimbabwe

== Medalists ==
Event	Gold	Silver	Bronze
Men	Badr Siwane; Morocco	Mohammed El Mehdi Essadiq; Morocco	Oussama Hellal; Algeria
Women	Basmla ElSalamoney; Egypt	Laurelle Elizabeth Brown; Zimbabwe	Andie Leigh Kuipers; Zimbabwe
Mixed Relay	Tunisia; Syrine Fattoum; Ons Lajili; Mohamed Aziz Sebai; Seifeddine Selmi	Algeria; Nazim Omar Benyelles; Oussama Hellal; Imene Maldji; Kahina Mebarki	Egypt; Basmla ElSalamoney; Rehab Hussein; Mohamed Khalil; Mohamed Shehata

== Medal table ==
* Host nation (Morocco)

Rank	Nation	Gold	Silver	Bronze	Total
1	Morocco (MAR)*	1	1	0	2
2	Egypt (EGY)	1	0	1	2
3	Tunisia (TUN)	1	0	0	1
4	Algeria (ALG)	0	1	1	2
4	Zimbabwe (ZIM)	0	1	1	2
Totals (5 entries)		3	3	3	9

== Results ==
=== Men's individual ===
The men's event was held on 24 August.

Rank	Athlete	Time
1st place, gold medalist(s)	Badr Siwane; Morocco	57:48
2nd place, silver medalist(s)	Mohammed El Mehdi Essadiq; Morocco	58:04
3rd place, bronze medalist(s)	Oussama Hellal; Algeria	58:47
4	Timothee Guy Hugnin; Mauritius	58:53
5	Nabil Kouzkouz; Morocco	59:43
6	Nazim Omar Benyelles; Algeria	1:01:06
7	Mohamed Aziz Sebai; Tunisia	1:01:12
8	Seifeddine Selmi; Tunisia	1:01:22
9	Mamadou Diop; Senegal	1:06:24
10	Mohamed Shehata; Egypt	1:06:44
11	Matthew Anthony Denslow; Zimbabwe	1:08:08
12	Jean Gael Laurent L'Entete; Mauritius	1:08:38
13	Abdalla Mansour; Kenya	1:08:54
14	Jordyn Liam Jacobs; Zimbabwe	1:09:03
15	Hamadel Nestor Ndiaye; Senegal	1:10:24
16	Soud Hassan Soud; Kenya	1:20:56
17	Mohamed Khalil; Egypt	DNF

=== Women's individual ===
The women's event was held on 24 August.

Rank	Athlete	Time
1st place, gold medalist(s)	Basmla ElSalamoney; Egypt	1:07:34
2nd place, silver medalist(s)	Laurelle Elizabeth Brown; Zimbabwe	1:07:52
3rd place, bronze medalist(s)	Andie Leigh Kuipers; Zimbabwe	1:08:57
4	Ons Lajili; Tunisia	1:10:00
5	Kahina Mebarki; Algeria	1:11:38
6	Imene Maldji; Algeria	1:12:57
7	Syrine Fattoum; Tunisia	1:14:25
8	Karima Kanoun; Morocco	1:15:31
9	Lisa-marie Chloe Laetitia D'Autriche; Mauritius	1:18:57
10	Anta Ndiaye; Senegal	1:19:23
11	Hanifa Mohamed Said; Kenya	1:19:48
12	Samia M'Safer; Morocco	1:19:55
13	Oumaima El Atrassi; Morocco	1:24:20
14	Josette Njeri; Kenya	1:25:42
15	Sall Adji Mame Awa; Senegal	1:42:03
16	Rehab Hussein; Egypt	DSQ

=== Mixed relay ===
The mixed relay event was held on 25 August.

Rank	Team	Time
1st place, gold medalist(s)	Tunisia	1:16:30
2nd place, silver medalist(s)	Algeria	1:17:49
3rd place, bronze medalist(s)	Egypt	1:17:57
4	Morocco	1:18:04
5	Zimbabwe	1:18:06
6	Senegal	1:30:00
7	Kenya	1:31:07
