= Triathlon at the 2023 African Games =

- Location: Accra, Ghana
- Dates: 15 March 2024
- Competitors: 40 from 13 nations

Triathlon at the 2023 African Games was held on 15 March 2024 in Accra, Ghana.

== Medal summary ==
=== Medal table ===
Rank	Nation	Gold	Silver	Bronze	Total
1	South Africa (RSA)	2	1	1	4
2	Morocco (MAR)	0	1	0	1
3	Algeria (ALG)	0	0	1	1
Totals (3 entries)		2	2	2	6

=== Events ===
Event	Gold		Silver		Bronze	
Men's individual	Nicholas Quenet; South Africa	57:36	Badr Siwane; Morocco	58:09	Dylan Nortjé; South Africa	59:16
Women's individual	Vicky van der Merwe; South Africa	1:04:29	Shanae Williams; South Africa	1:06:41	Kahina Mebarki; Algeria	1:09:07

== Participating nations ==
40 competitors from 13 nations participated:

1. Algeria (4)
2. Egypt (4)
3. Ghana (4)
4. Kenya (4)
5. Mauritius (3)
6. Morocco (1)
7. Nigeria (4)
8. Rwanda (1)
9. Senegal (2)
10. Sierra Leone (1)
11. South Africa (4)
12. Tunisia (4)
13. Zimbabwe (4)
