= Holly Lawrence =

British triathlete

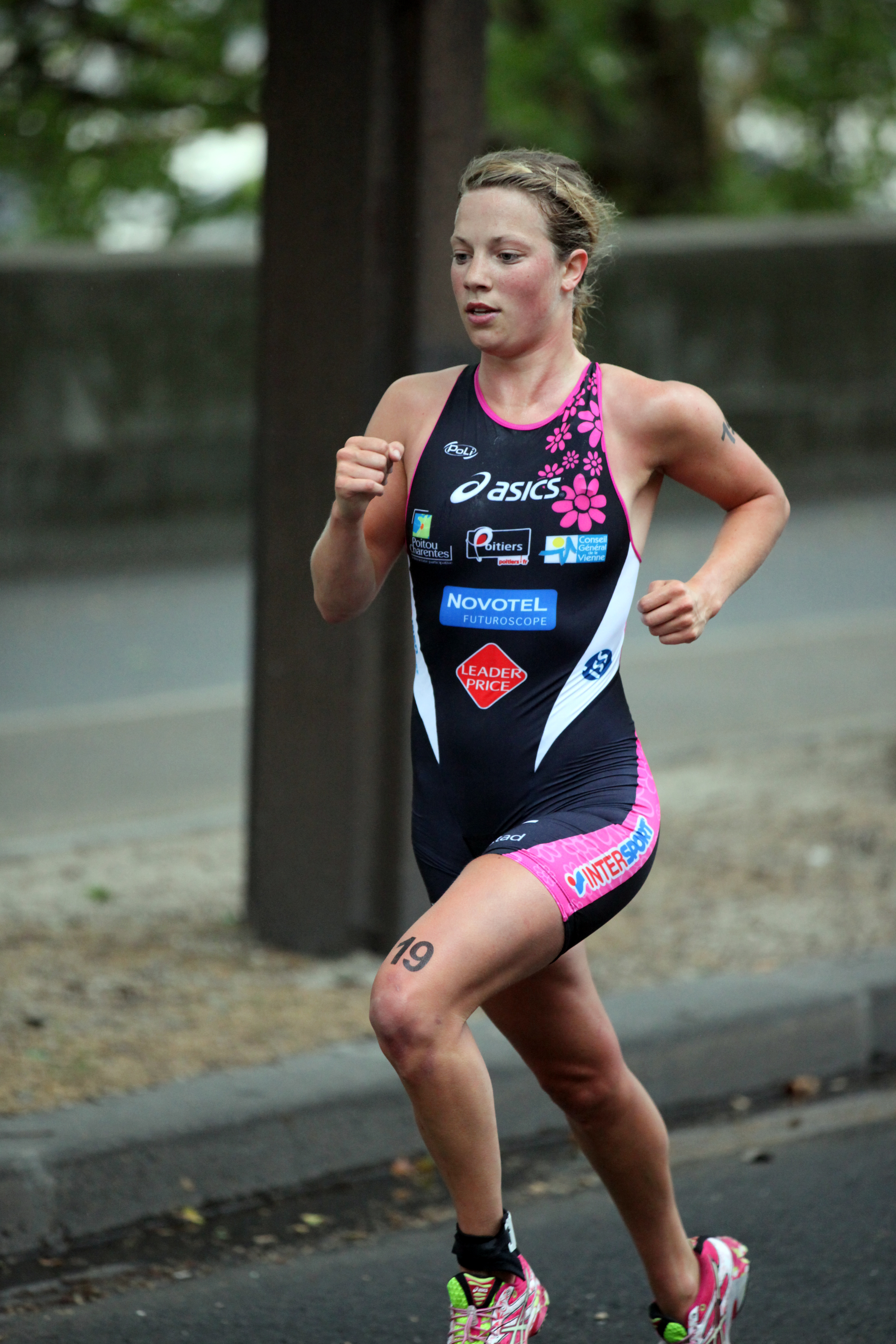
- Lawrence in 2011

Personal information
- Nationality: Wales
- Born: 25 February 1990 (age 36)

Sport
- Sport: Triathlon

Achievements and titles
- World finals: 2016
- Regional finals: 2014
- Commonwealth finals: 2014
Medal record
Triathlon
Representing Great Britain
European Triathlon Championships
Bronze medal – third place	2014 Kitzbühel	Team event
Ironman 70.3 World Championship
Gold medal – first place	2016 Mooloolaba	Ironman 70.3
Silver medal – second place	2019 Nice	Ironman 70.3

Holly Lawrence (born 25 February 1990) is a triathlete who competed for Wales in the mixed relay event at the 2014 Commonwealth Games, and won the 2016 Ironman 70.3 World Championship. Lawrence is a fraternal triplet.

== Career ==
Lawrence began competing in the UK at the age of 17-18. Lawrence competed in the 2014 European Triathlon Championships; she finished eleventh in the individual event, and third in the mixed team relay. She competed for Wales in the mixed relay event at the 2014 Commonwealth Games, finishing eighth. She began competing in Ironman 70.3 events in 2015. Lawrence won the 2016 Ironman 70.3 World Championship in Mooloolaba, Queensland, Australia, in a time of four hours, nine minutes and 11 seconds. In the same year, she won three other Ironman 70.3 events, including one in Beijing. In 2017, Lawrence signed for the Trek Factory Racing triathlon team. She came second at the 2019 Ironman 70.3 World Championship, finishing behind Daniela Ryf.
