= Basmla ElSalamoney =

Egyptian triathlete

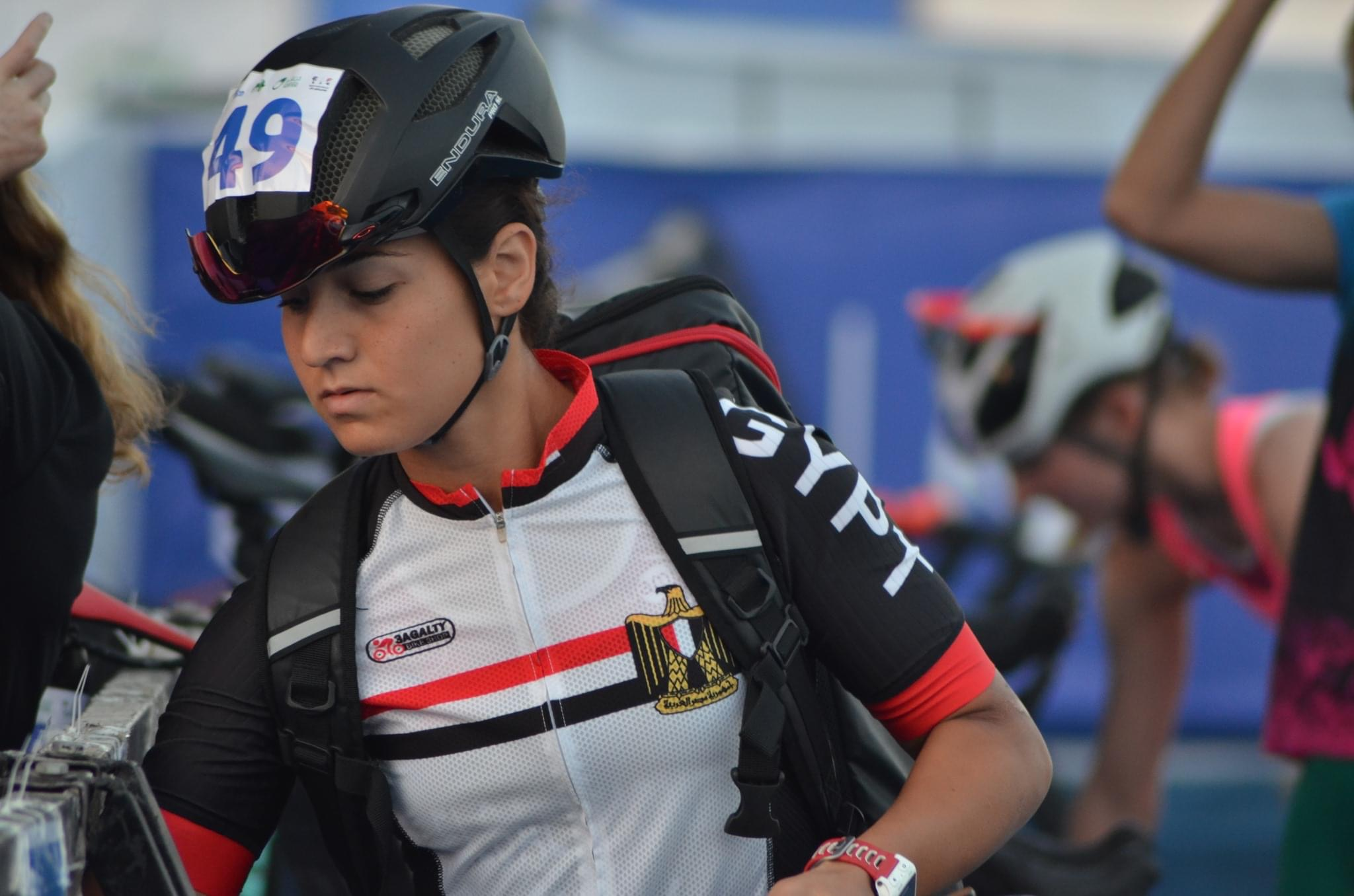
- Basmla Elsalamoney at the 2021 Africa Triathlon Championship

Personal information
- Native name: بسملة السلاموني
- Citizenship: Egyptian
- Born: 25 February 1999 (age 27) Gharbia, Egypt
- Occupation: Student

Sport
- Country: Egypt
- Sport: Triathlon
- Position: U23 Women - Elite Women
- Rank: 68 (August 2021)
- Club: The Hikestep Military Sport School
- Team: The ASICS World Triathlon Development Team
- Turned pro: 2018
- Coached by: Ahmed Salama

Achievements and titles
- Highest world ranking: 68 (August 2021)
Medal record
Women's triathlon
Representing Egypt
African Games
Gold medal – first place	2019 Rabat	Women
Bronze medal – third place	2019 Rabat	Mixed relay

Basmla Abdelhamid Abdelhamid Elsalamoney بسملة عبد الحميد عبدالحميد السلاموني (born 25, February, 1999) at Gharbia, Egypt is an Egyptian triathlete. Basmla is the first ever Egyptian to qualify to the Olympics triathlon, and the first Arab female triathlete to do so. While she took part in Tokyo 2020, also she was the youngest competitor at Triathlon at the 2020 Summer Olympics.

She represented Egypt at the 2019 African Games held in Rabat, Morocco and she won the women's triathlon event. She also won the bronze medal in the mixed relay event.
