= Non Stanford =

Welsh triathlete

Non Stanford MBE
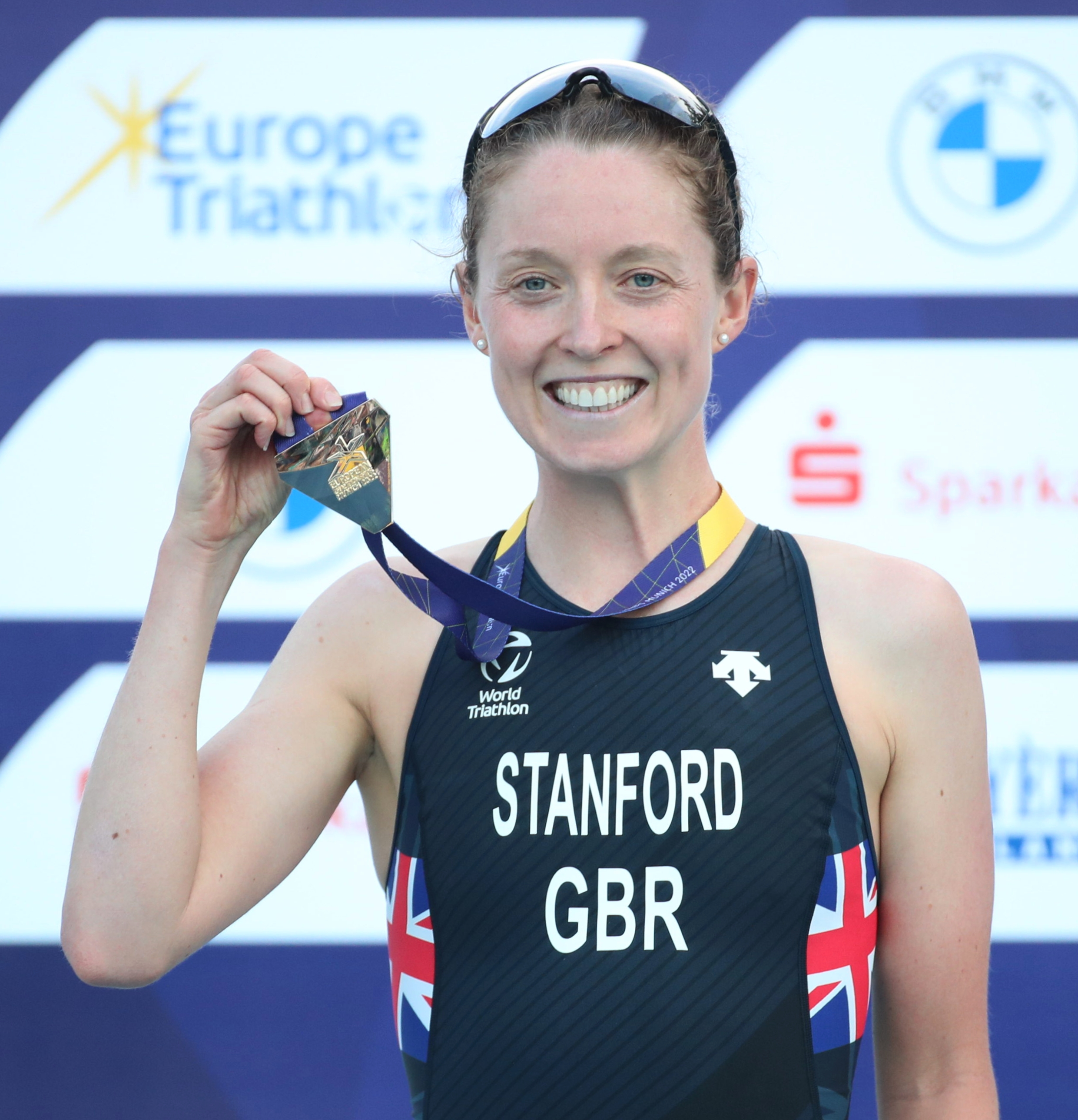
- Stanford in Munich, 2022

Personal information
- Nationality: British
- Born: 8 January 1989 (age 37) Bridgend, Wales, United Kingdom

Sport
- Country: Wales; Great Britain
- Sport: Triathlon
Medal record
Women's triathlon
Representing Great Britain
World Triathlon Series
Gold medal – first place	2013	Individual
World Mixed Relay Championships
Gold medal – first place	2012 Stockholm	Mixed team
Bronze medal – third place	2015 Hamburg	Mixed team
Europe Championships
Gold medal – first place	2022 Munich	Individual
Representing Wales
Commonwealth Games
Silver medal – second place	2022 Birmingham	Mixed relay

Non Rhiannydd Stanford MBE (born 8 January 1989) is a British former professional triathlete, representing Great Britain and Wales at international level. Stanford was the ITU (now World Triathlon) World Champion in 2013, part of the Great Britain world champion mixed relay team in 2012 and represented Team GB at the 2016 Olympic Games in Rio de Janeiro, where she finished fourth behind teammate and housemate Vicky Holland. Hindered thereafter by recurrent injuries, she struggled to repeat the dominant form of her early years. In her final year of competition, 2022, however she found an exceptional final flourish of form; she anchored Wales to silver in the team event at the 2022 Commonwealth Games, her first Commonwealth medal and her first major championship medal since 2015 World Triathlon mixed relay bronze. One week later, in her final major Olympic distance triathlon race, Stanford won her first and only European championship.

Non Stanford is based in Leeds, England and was born in Bridgend, Wales. Non is a Welsh name, and takes after Saint Non.

== Personal life ==
Stanford was born in Bridgend, but grew up in nearby Swansea. Her first club was Swansea Harriers. Stanford graduated from the University of Birmingham with a degree in Sport and Exercises Sciences in 2010. She was appointed Member of the Order of the British Empire (MBE) in the 2023 Birthday Honours for services to triathlon in Wales.

== Career ==
Stanford was a successful cross country runner; she was Welsh Schools 1,500m champion in 2002, 2003 and 2004. Stanford was picked out as a bright young running talent in 2004 when she was invited to join Kelly Holmes on the first ever 'On Camp with Kelly' in South Africa. In 2006, she finished 3rd in the 3000m (senior) at the AAA Indoor championships. Stanford started studying Sport and Exercises Sciences at the University of Birmingham and in summer 2008 joined the university's triathlon club, changing her focus from running to triathlon after a series of injuries kept her off the track.

In the 2009 British Triathlon Super Series she came second, and in 2009/10 was awarded the 'Paul Weston Triathlon Scholarship' to concentrate on triathlon. After graduating in 2010, she won a bronze medal at the Brasschaat ITU Triathlon Premium European Cup. In the same year Stanford also took part in the prestigious French Club Championship Series Lyonnaise des Eaux and represented Montpellier Agglo Tri. Her current French Grand Prix team is the TCG 79 Parthenay team.

Stanford relocated to the British Triathlon base at Leeds Beckett University at the Leeds Triathlon Centre. The 2012 season was a breakthrough year for her as she won senior gold in the Stockholm ITU Triathlon Mixed Relay World Championships and U23 gold at the Barfoot and Thompson World Triathlon Grand Final Auckland. The 2013 season started with a win at ITU World Triathlon Madrid, before going on to take the title of ITU World Champion at the ITU World Triathlon Grand Final London. That season Stanford also achieved silver medals at the ITU World Triathlon San Diego, ITU World Triathlon Hamburg and ITU World Triathlon Stockholm.

Due to injury, Stanford's entire 2014 season was missed, but she came back strongly in 2015 to finish 2nd at both the Rio Olympic Test Event and the ITU World Triathlon Grand Final Chicago – securing Olympic selection in the process. 2016 started successfully for Stanford, as she opened her season with a win at ITU World Triathlon Cape Town. Competing in her first Olympics in Rio August 2016, she finished in 4th place. Stanford joined ECS Triathlon club in 2016. 2017 was again affected by injury, but she did achieve a win at Chengdu ITU Triathlon World Cup.

The 2018 season saw Stanford win two silver medals at the Cape Town ITU Triathlon World Cup and ITU World Triathlon Mixed Relay Series Nottingham. She also secured a bronze medal at the ITU World Triathlon Yokohama. Stanford also captained Team Wales at the 2018 Gold Coast Commonwealth Games.

In 2019 Stanford left the Brownlee Centre in Leeds and joined an international group of elite triathletes under coach Joel Filliol. The season saw her win gold at the 2019 Hamburg Wasser World Triathlon. At the end of 2019 Stanford underwent knee surgery to remove damaged cartilage.

She competed at the 2022 Commonwealth Games where she came 6th in the women's event. After winning a silver medal for Wales in the mixed triathlon relay at the same Games, she went on to win the Europe Triathlon Championships, and announced her retirement. Stanford accepted a coaching role at the Leeds headquarters of British Triathlon to follow her retirement from elite competition.

== Palmares ==
The following is a list of podium finishes in World Triathlon Series, WTS Mixed Relay Series and championship events. Results in Bold represent Championship races or overall positions

Year	Competition	Round	Rank
2012	**World Triathlon Mixed Relay Championships**	**Hamburg**	1st place, gold medalist(s)
2013	**World Triathlon Series**	San Diego	2nd place, silver medalist(s)
2013	**World Triathlon Series**	Madrid	1st place, gold medalist(s)
2013	**World Triathlon Series**	Hamburg	2nd place, silver medalist(s)
2013	**World Triathlon Series**	Stockholm	2nd place, silver medalist(s)
2013	**World Triathlon Series**	London	1st place, gold medalist(s)
2013	**World Triathlon Series**	**Overall**	1st place, gold medalist(s)
2015	World Triathlon Series	Hamburg	3rd place, bronze medalist(s)
2015	World Triathlon Series	Chicago	2nd place, silver medalist(s)
2015	**World Triathlon Mixed Relay Championships**	**Hamburg**	3rd place, bronze medalist(s)
2016	World Triathlon Series	Cape Town	1st place, gold medalist(s)
2018	World Triathlon Series	Yokohama	3rd place, bronze medalist(s)
2018	WTS Mixed Relay Series	Nottingham	2nd place, silver medalist(s)
2019	World Triathlon Series	Hamburg	1st place, gold medalist(s)
2022	**Commonwealth Games - mixed relay**	**Birmingham**	2nd place, silver medalist(s)
2022	**Europe Triathlon Championships**	**Munich**	1st place, gold medalist(s)
