= Mari Rabie =

South African triathlete

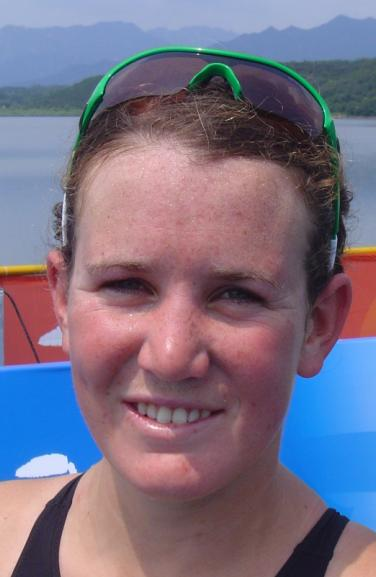

Personal information
- Nationality: South African
- Born: 10 September 1986 (age 39)
- Height: <171cm X m or X ft Y in (automatic conversion) plus optional year and reference -->
- Weight: <58kg X lb or X st Y lb (automatic conversion) plus optional year and reference -->

Sport
- Sport: Triathlon

Mari Rabie (born 10 September 1986) is a South African triathlete who competed in the 2008 & 2016 Summer Olympics and the 2006 Commonwealth Games. Rabie was elected as a Rhodes Scholar for 2010. She graduated with a Masters in Applied Statistics from St Catherine's College Oxford in 2011 and an MBA at Oxford University in 2013 at Exeter College. She has completed her degree in Actuarial Science at the University of Stellenbosch in 2009 and attended Bloemhof Girls' High School in Stellenbosch.

In 2008, she finished 43rd in the Olympic triathlon event after suffering severe technical problems with her bike. She described Beijing as her "greatest disappointment ever", only once returning to International Competition with a 4th place in 2010.

Rabie returned to racing briefly between her two Oxford degrees with a 3rd-place finish at the World Xterra Championships in Maui, Hawaii in 2012.

She briefly returned to racing in 2014 and was diagnosed with myocarditis in June 2014, she resumed training in 2015 & qualified for the Rio Olympic Games where she finished 11th. She obtained her Oxford MBA in 2013.

Rabie retired from professional sport in October 2016.

== Results ==
=== 2016 results ===
- 11th Olympic Games Rio

=== 2012 results ===
- 3rd Xterra World Championships

=== 2010 results ===
- 1st South African Ironman 70.3
- 1st South African Xterra
- South African Champion
- 4th ITU World Cup Triathlon, Monterrey Mexico

=== 2008 results ===
- All African Champion
- South African Champion
- 3rd World U23 Triathlon Championships
