= Yasmine Hammamet =

Seaside resort in Hammamet, Tunisia

Yasmine Hammamet is a seaside resort in Tunisia, developed in the late 1990s.

== Overview ==
The resort is situated south-west of Hammamet, between the territories of the municipalities of Hammamet and Bouficha. Developed by the Society of Studies and Development of Hammamet-South, it spreads over 277 ha, with a sea front of four kilometers. It groups 46 hotels (among whom 80% are 4 and 5 stars), with 19000 beds and 2000 residential units with 11000 beds, in apartments, villas and bungalows.

It includes a reproduction of a medina with souks, a theme park (Carthage Land) and a large conference center.
