= Lizel Moore =

South African triathlete

Lizel Moore (born 29 June 1970 in Bloemfontein) is a retired athlete from South Africa, who competes in triathlon.

Moore competed at the first Olympic triathlon at the 2000 Summer Olympics. She took thirtieth place with a total time of 2:08:18.19.

She studied economics at the University of Queensland.
