= Kim Carter =

Colonel (ret.) Kim S. Carter was the seventh Ombudsperson of the province of British Columbia, Canada.

She was educated at Glendon College, York University in Toronto, Ontario, Osgoode Hall Law School of York University (LLB '79) and University of Ottawa (LLM '05), and called to the Bar of Ontario in 1981. In 1999, Carter was appointed as the first independent Director of Military Prosecutions for the Canadian Forces and in 2002 became Canada's first female Chief Military Judge. She served in the Canadian Forces from 1975 to 2006 and was named the seventh Ombudsman for the province of British Columbia in April 2006. The provincial legislature changed the name of the office to "Ombudsperson" in 2009. Carter was reappointed to a second six-year term in May 2012. Carter retired in 2015.

As Ombudsperson, Carter has introduced an early resolution program to assist in achieving fair and timely resolutions for individuals and authorities as well as establishing an active systemic investigation team that has produced a number of public reports on areas ranging from lottery prize security to home and community care programs for seniors.
