= Chloe MacCombe =

Para-triathlete from Northern Ireland

Personal information
- Born: 24 May 1995 (age 31) Northern Ireland
- Home town: Claudy
- Height: 163 cm (5 ft 4 in)
- Weight: 60 kg (132 lb)

Sport
- Country: Northern Ireland
- Sport: Paratriathlon
- Disability: Albinism
- Disability class: PTVI, B3
- Club: Tri Limits Triathlon Club
- Coached by: Natasha Kelly
Medal record
Representing Northern Ireland
Commonwealth Games
Silver medal – second place	2022 Birmingham	Triathlon PTVI

Chloe MacCombe (/ˈkloʊiː məˈkuːm/; born 24 May 1995) is a Northern Irish paratriathlete.

Chloe is one of a pair of twins, along with Judith MacCombe, with visual impairment due to albinism; both compete as paratriathletes.

Chloe won a silver medal at the 2022 Commonwealth Games in the women's paratriathlon, with Catherine A. Sands as her sighted guide.
