= Megan Hall (triathlete) =

South African triathlete (born 1974)

Megan Hall (born 5 March 1974 in Pietermaritzburg) is a triathlete from South Africa.

Hall competed at the second Olympic triathlon at the 2004 Summer Olympics. She took thirty-sixth place with a total time of 2:16:26.53.
