= Henri Schoeman =

South African triathlete

Personal information
- Nationality: South African
- Born: 3 October 1991 (age 35) Vereeniging, South Africa
- Height: 1.70 m (5 ft 7 in)
- Weight: 57 kg (126 lb)
- Spouse: Franzel Schoeman

Sport
- Country: South Africa
- Sport: Triathlon
- Coached by: Joe Schoeman; Alisdair Hatfield
Medal record
Men's triathlon
Representing South Africa
Olympic Games
| Bronze medal – third place | 2016 Rio de Janeiro | Triathlon |
Commonwealth Games
| Gold medal – first place | 2018 Gold Coast | Triathlon |
| Silver medal – second place | 2014 Glasgow | Mixed relay |
2016 ITU World Triathlon Series
| Gold medal – first place | ITU Grand Final | Triathlon |
African Triathlon Championships
| Gold medal – first place | 2021 Charm el-Cheikh | Triathlon |
| Gold medal – first place | 2016 Buffalo City | Triathlon |
| Gold medal – first place | 2015 Charm el-Cheikh | Triathlon |
| Gold medal – first place | 2014 Troutbeck | Triathlon |
| Gold medal – first place | 2013 Agadir | Triathlon |
| Silver medal – second place | 2026 Hurghada | Triathlon |
Arena Games Triathlon Series
| Gold medal – first place | 2023 eSports World Champion | Triathlon |

Henri Schoeman (born 3 October 1991) is a South African triathlete. He represented his country at the 2016 ITU Grand Final in Cozumel, where he won the gold medal; the 2016 Summer Olympics, where he won a bronze medal; and the 2014 Commonwealth Games, where he won a silver medal in the mixed relay. He is the brother of the South African swimmer, Riaan Schoeman. His bronze at Rio in 2016 is the first Olympic medal South Africa has won in the sport. In 2021, he competed in the men's triathlon at the 2020 Summer Olympics held in Tokyo, Japan.

== Career ==
Schoeman was a strong swimmer at school and soon progressed to be a strong talent at long-distance swimming for his country. He switched sports to take up the triathlon in his mid-teens and won the Under 19 South African championship in consecutive years. However, he sustained stress fractures in his shins in 2009 which kept him from competing for two years. A mountain bike accident in 2011 then ruled him out of competition but allowed him time to recuperate and build strength in his legs, allowing him to return to competition stronger.

Schoeman won the 2016 ITU World Triathlon Series Grand Final September 18, 2016, placing him 4th overall for the series. Schoeman was due to finish 3rd, but Alistair Brownlee slowed to help his brother Jonny over the line. During this assist, Schoeman passed the Brownlee brothers and won gold. In the run-up to the Rio games, Schoeman had developed a suspected respiratory illness, stating after the race: "I have had fever the whole week. The doctor only gave me the all-clear to be on the start line yesterday".
