= Jodie Stimpson =

British professional triathlete (born 1989)

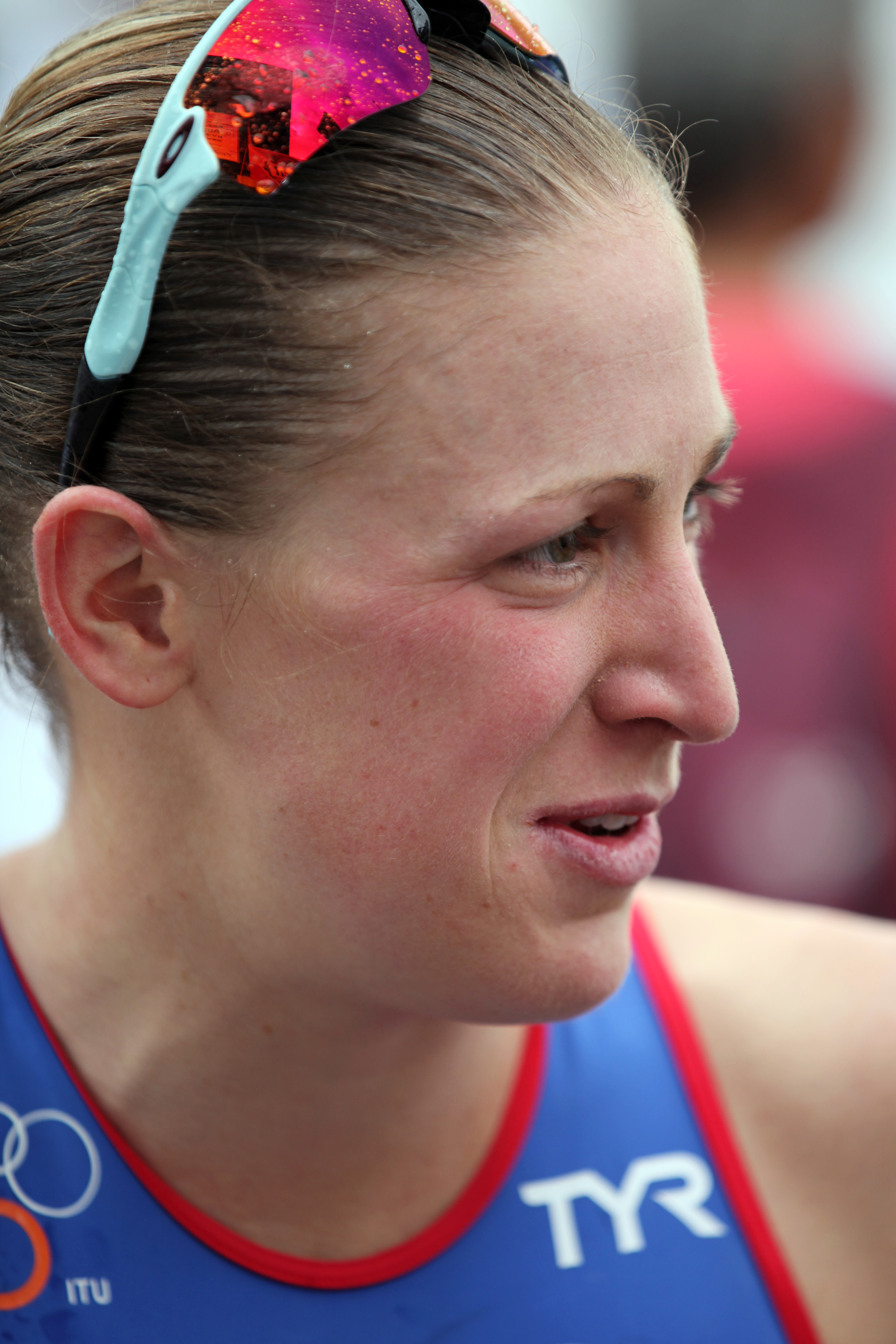
- Stimpson at the World Series mountain triathlon in Kitzbuhel, 2013.

Personal information
- Born: 8 February 1989 (age 37) Oldbury, West Midlands, England

Sport
- Country: Great Britain
Medal record
Women's triathlon
Representing Great Britain
ITU Triathlon World Championships
| Gold medal – first place | 2011 Lausanne | Mixed Team Relay |
Representing England
Commonwealth Games
| Gold medal – first place | 2014 Glasgow | Individual |
| Gold medal – first place | 2014 Glasgow | Mixed Team |

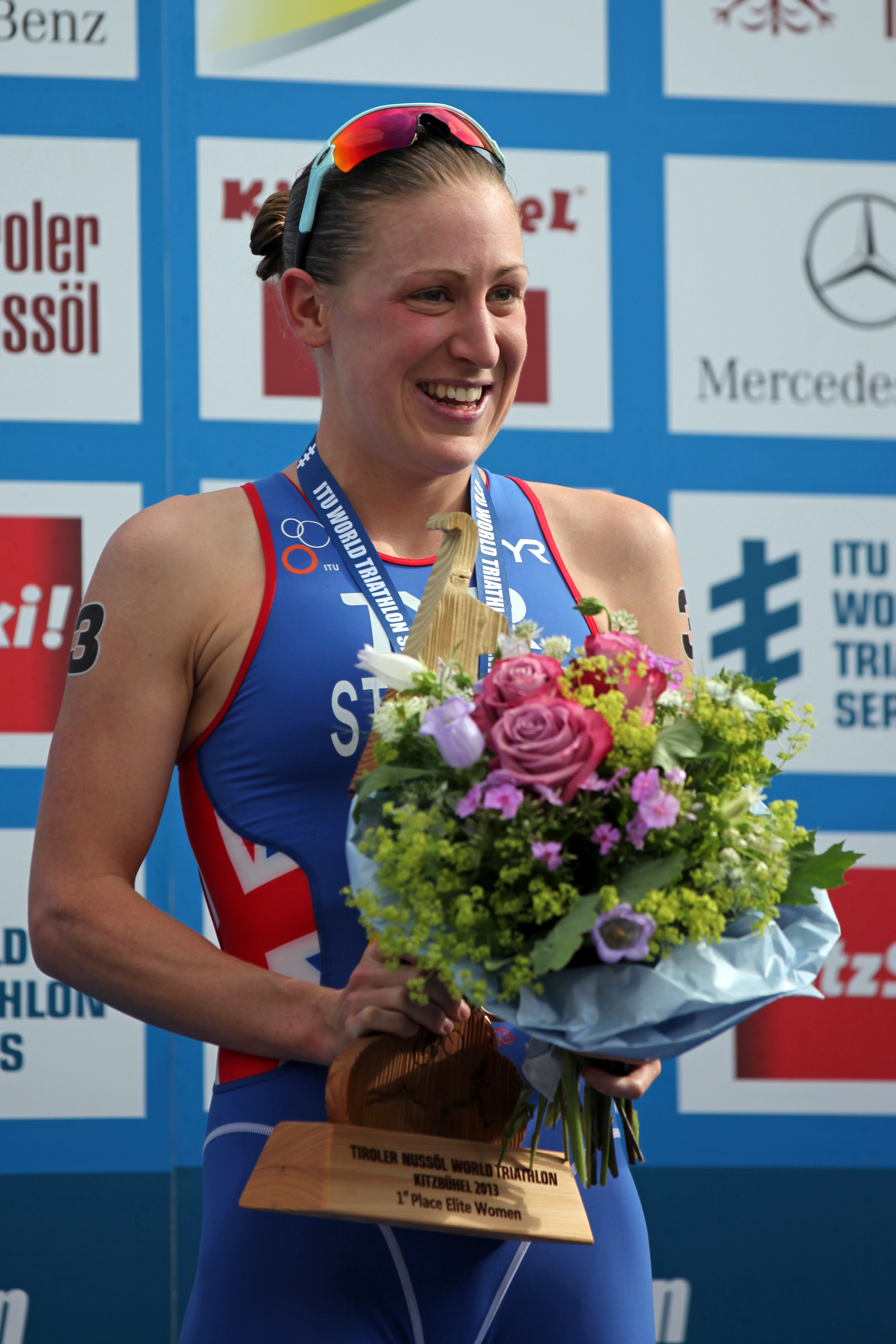
Jodie Stimpson, winner of the World Series mountain triathlon in Kitzbuhel, 2013.

Jodie Lee Stimpson (born 8 February 1989) is a British professional triathlete who also currently competes in the Iron Man distance of the sport. In 2013, she finished runner-up in the ITU World Triathlon Series. She has won 3 global titles during her career.

She was also Aquathlon World Champion of the year 2006, U23 vice Triathlon World Champion of the year 2008, 2009 British Triathlon Champion and 2010 British Triathlon Super Series winner.

In the prestigious French Club Championship Series Lyonnaise des Eaux, Stimpson represents Poissy Tri. In 2010, however, Stimpson took part in only one Lyonnaise triathlon, the Triathlon de Paris, and won the gold medal. Together with Erin Densham (Australia) and Jodie Swallow (Great Britain) she won the silver medal for her French club.

In 2011, Jodie won her 1st World title in Triathlon when part of the GB team, which took Gold at the World Mixed Relay Championship.

On 24 July 2014, Stimpson won her 1st Individual Global title, with Gold at the 2014 Commonwealth Games in the Triathlon.

Stimpson took gold in the mixed triathlon team relay at the 2014 Commonwealth Games, with the Brownlee brothers, Alistair and Jonathan, and Vicky Holland.

== ITU Competitions ==
In the six years from 2005 to 2010, Stimpson took part in 17 ITU competitions and achieved six top ten positions. The following list is based upon the official ITU rankings and the Athlete's Profile Page. Unless indicated otherwise, the following events are triathlons (Olympic Distance) and belong to the Elite category.

| Date | Competition | Place | Rank |
|---|---|---|---|
| 2005-07-24 | European Championships (Youth / Team) | Alexandroupoli(s) | 1 |
| 2006-07-30 | European Cup (Junior) | Salford | DNF |
| 2006-08-30 | Aquathlon World Championships (Junior) | Lausanne | 1 |
| 2007-08-30 | British Gas World Championships (Junior) | Hamburg | 26 |
| 2008-05-10 | European Championships (Junior) | Lisbon | DNF |
| 2009-03-01 | OTU Oceania Championships | Gold Coast | DNF |
| 2009-06-20 | European Championships (U23) | Tarzo Revine | 2 |
| 2009-07-25 | Dextro Energy World Championship Series | Hamburg | DNF |
| 2009-08-15 | Dextro Energy World Championship Series | London | 11 |
| 2009-09-09 | Dextro Energy World Championship Series, Grand Final (U23) | Gold Coast | 2 |
| 2010-03-27 | World Cup | Mooloolaba | 6 |
| 2010-04-11 | Dextro Energy World Championship Series | Sydney | 18 |
| 2010-06-12 | Elite Cup | Hy-Vee | 7 |
| 2010-07-24 | Dextro Energy World Championship Series | London | 25 |
| 2010-08-14 | Dextro Energy World Championship Series | Kitzbuhel | DNF |
| 2010-08-21 | Sprint World Championships | Lausanne | 8 |
| 2010-09-08 | Dextro Energy World Championship Series, Grand Final | Budapest | 30 |

DNF = did not finish · DNS = did not start
