= Emma Jackson (triathlete) =

Australian triathlete

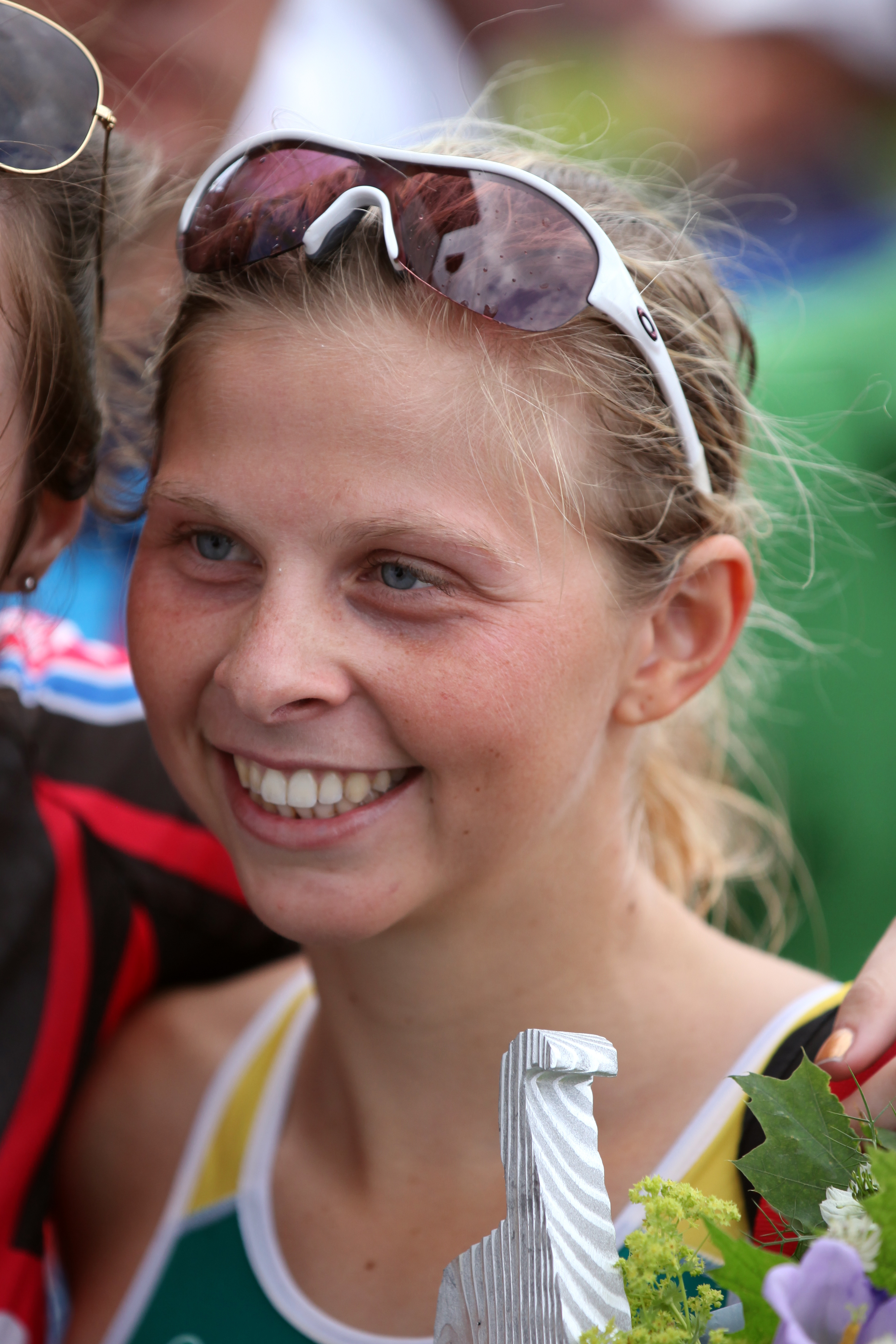
Emma Jackson winning the silver medal at the World Series mountain triathlon in Kitzbuhel, 2013.

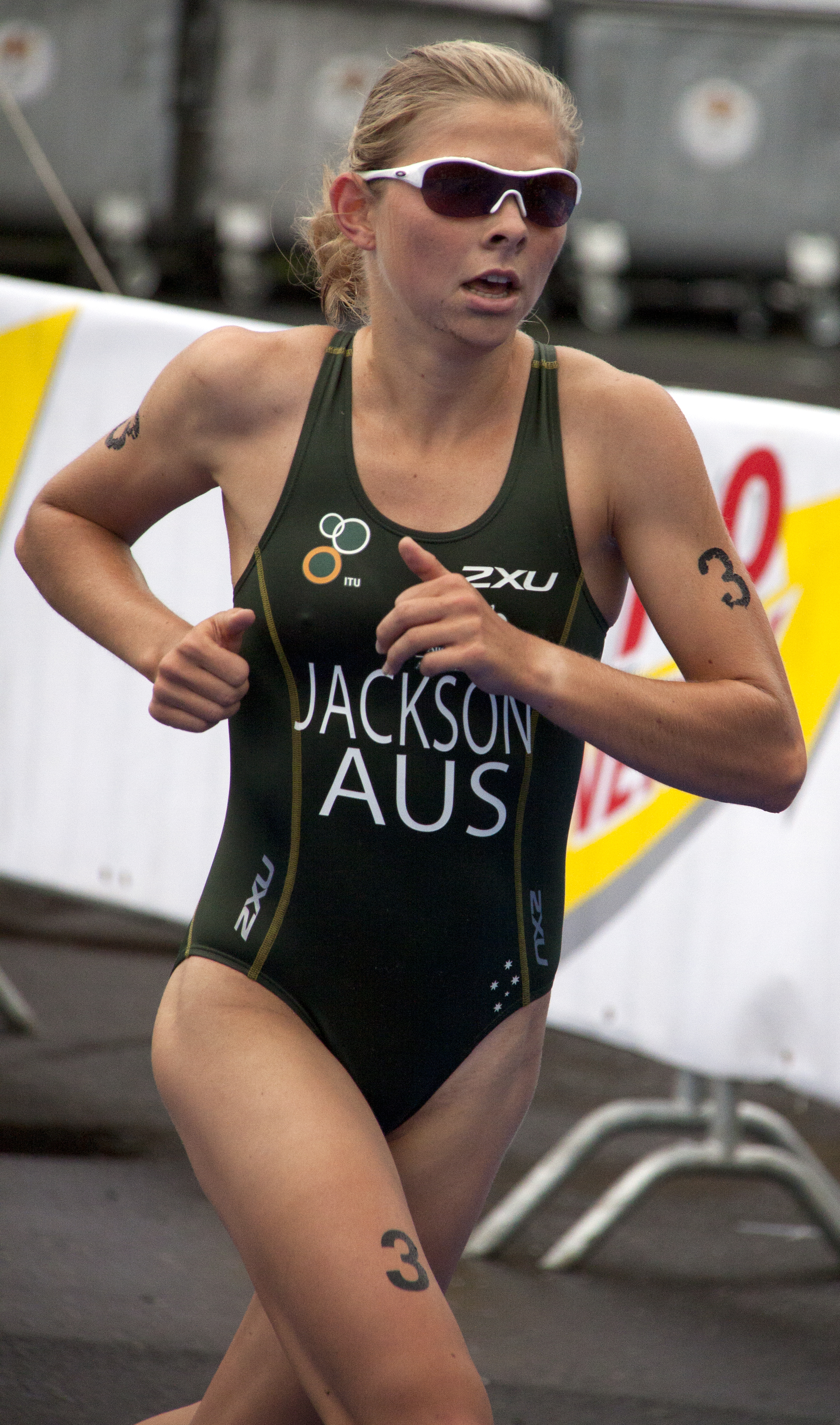
Emma Jackson winning the gold medal at the U23 World Championship in Budapest, 2010

Emma Jackson (born 20 August 1991 in Joyner, Brisbane, Queensland) is an Australian professional triathlete, U23 World Champion of the year 2010, and 2009 Junior World Championships silver medalist.

From 2007 to 2010 Jackson took part in 16 International Triathlon Union (ITU) competitions (now known as World Triathlon) and achieved 11 top ten positions. On 1 November 2009, she won the Australian Noosa Triathlon ($12,000). Since then, she is often mentioned in the Australian media as part of the other famous three Australian triathlon runners named Emma: Emma Carney, Emma Snowsill, and Emma Moffatt.

Emma Jackson is coached by Stephen Moss, the head coach of the state run high performance centre called Queensland Academy of Sport, and represents Moss' Pine Rivers Triathlon Club.

In 2010, Emma Jackson also represented the French club TCG 79 Parthenay in the Club Championship Series Lyonnaise des Eaux. At the Triathlon de Paris (18 July 2010), she placed 2nd and her club placed 4th, at Tourangeaux (29 August 2010) she placed 9th and her club placed 5th, and at the Grand Final in La Baule (Triathlon Audencia, 18 September 2010), immediately after her U23 World Championship gold medal, she placed 16th and her club 4th. Thus Jackson was always among the three triathlètes classants l'éqipe, i.e. the three best athletes on whose results the club ranking is based. At the triathlon in La Baule, TCG 79 Parthenay had no French triathletes at all among its three classants: Ainhoa Murua placed 11th, Nicky Samuels 13th and Jackson 16th.

At the 2012 Summer Olympics, she competed for Australia, finishing in 8th place. At the 2014 Commonwealth Games, she won a bronze medal in the mixed relay with Emma Moffatt, Aaron Royle and Ryan Bailie.

== ITU competitions ==
In the four years from 2007 to 2010, Jackson took part in 17 ITU competitions and achieved 11 top ten positions.

The following list is based upon the official ITU rankings and the athlete's official Profile Page. Unless indicated otherwise, the following events are triathlons (Olympic Distance) and belong to the Elite category.

Date	Competition	Place	Rank
2007-08-30	BG World Championships (Junior)	Hamburg	24
2008-02-03	Sprint Distance OTU Oceania Championships (Junior)	Taupo	5
2008-06-05	BG World Championships (Junior)	Vancouver	5
2009-01-14	Australian Youth Olympic Festival (Elite)	Sydney	7
2009-03-01	OTU Oceania Championships (Junior)	Gold Coast	8
2009-03-15	Oceania Cup	Perth	6
2009-07-05	Asian Cup	Sendai Bay	2
2009-09-09	Dextro Energy World Championship Series, Grand Final: Junior World Championships	Gold Coast	2
2010-03-13	OTU Oceania Championships (U23)	Wellington	1
2010-04-11	Dextro Energy World Championship Series	Sydney	24
2010-05-08	Dextro Energy World Championship Series	Seoul	34
2010-07-10	World Cup	Holten	6
2010-07-24	Dextro Energy World Championship Series	London	34
2010-08-08	World Cup	Tiszaújváros	5
2010-08-21	Sprint World Championships	Lausanne	DNF
2010-09-11	Dextro Energy World Championship Series, Grand Final: U23 World Championship	Budapest	1
2010-10-16	World Cup	Tongyeong	11
2011-02-06	Sprint Oceania Cup	Kinloch	8
2017-02-12	OTU Sprint Triathlon Oceania Championships	Kinloch	1
2017-03-11	World Cup	Mooloolaba	1
2019-07-20	World Triathlon Edmonton	Edmonton	1
2019-08-15	World Triathlon Olympic Qualification Event	Tokyo	15

BG = the sponsor British Gas · DNF = did not finish · DNS = did not start
