= Kirsten Sweetland =

Canadian triathlete (born 1988)

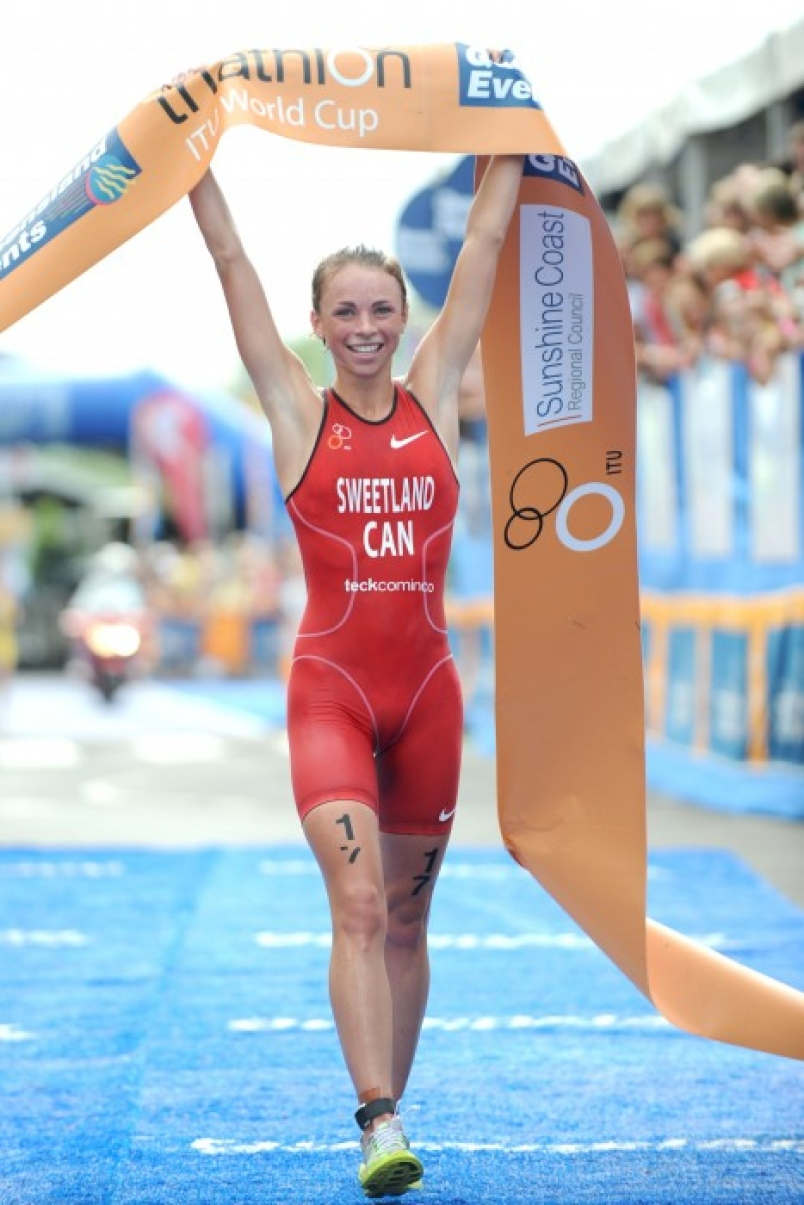
- Sweetland winning the 2009 ITU Mooloolaba World Cup

Personal information
- Born: September 24, 1988 (age 37) Nanaimo, British Columbia
- Height: 1.63 m (5 ft 4 in)
- Weight: 49 kg (108 lb)

Sport
- Country: Canada
Medal record
Triathlon
Representing Canada
Commonwealth Games
Silver medal – second place	2014 Glasgow	Women's

Kirsten Sweetland (born September 24, 1988) is a retired Canadian professional triathlete, the Junior World Champion of the year 2006, and the 2010 U23 World Championship silver medalist.

In the six years from 2005 to 2010, Sweetland took part in 26 ITU competitions and achieved 13 top ten positions. In 2010, Sweetland won the silver medals at the U23 World Championships and at the Premium Pan American Cup in Kelowna.

In France, Sweetland represents the club Tri Olympique Club Cessonnais in the prestigious French Club Championship Series Lyonnaise des Eaux and took part in one of the five triathlons of this circuit. At the Grand Final in La Baule (Triathlon Audencia) on 18 September 2010, she placed 8th and was the best triathlete of her club, which placed 5th thanks to the guest athletes Sweetland and Aileen Morrison.

In 2015, she was member of ECS Triathlon club in Sartrouville in France. In 2016, she was named to the Canadian Olympic team and competed in the Rio Olympics. Kirsten retired from elite triathlon in 2017. Today, she is a triathlon coach, supporting athletes through her online platform, as well as a Registered Massage Therapist.

== ITU Competitions ==
The following list is based upon the official ITU rankings and the athlete's ITU Profile Page. Unless indicated otherwise the following competitions are triathlons and belong to the Elite category.

Date	Competition	Place	Rank
2005-09-10	World Championships (Junior)	Gamagori	DNF
2006-07-29	Duathlon World Championships (Junior)	Corner Brook	2
2006-09-02	World Championships (Junior)	Lausanne	1
2006-11-12	BG World Cup	New Plymouth	15
2007-03-25	BG World Cup	Mooloolaba	15
2007-04-15	BG World Cup	Ishigaki	12
2007-05-06	BG World Cup	Lisbon	7
2007-05-13	BG World Cup	Richards Bay	1
2007-06-17	BG World Cup	Des Moines	DNF
2007-06-24	BG World Cup	Edmonton	2
2007-07-22	BG World Cup	Kitzbuhel	8
2007-07-29	BG World Cup	Salford	19
2007-08-30	BG World Championships	Hamburg	DNF
2007-09-15	BG World Cup	Beijing	DNF
2008-04-26	BG World Cup	Tongyeong	5
2008-06-05	BG World Championships	Vancouver	38
2009-03-01	OTU Oceania Championships	Gold Coast	DNS
2009-03-29	World Cup	Mooloolaba	1
2009-04-05	Oceania Cup	New Plymouth	1
2009-05-02	Dextro Energy World Championship Series	Tongyeong	5
2009-08-22	Dextro Energy World Championship Series	Yokohama	8
2010-03-27	World Cup	Mooloolaba	DNF
2010-07-17	Dextro Energy World Championship Series	Hamburg	DNF
2010-07-24	Dextro Energy World Championship Series	London	45
2010-08-20	Premium Pan American Cup	Kelowna	2
2010-09-11	Dextro Energy World Championship Series, Grand Final: U23 World Championship	Budapest	2
2010-10-17	PATCO Pan American Championships	Puerto Vallarta	DSQ

DNF = did not finish · DNS = did not start · DSQ = disqualified
