= Katie Crowhurst =

British Paratriathlete Katie Crowhurst

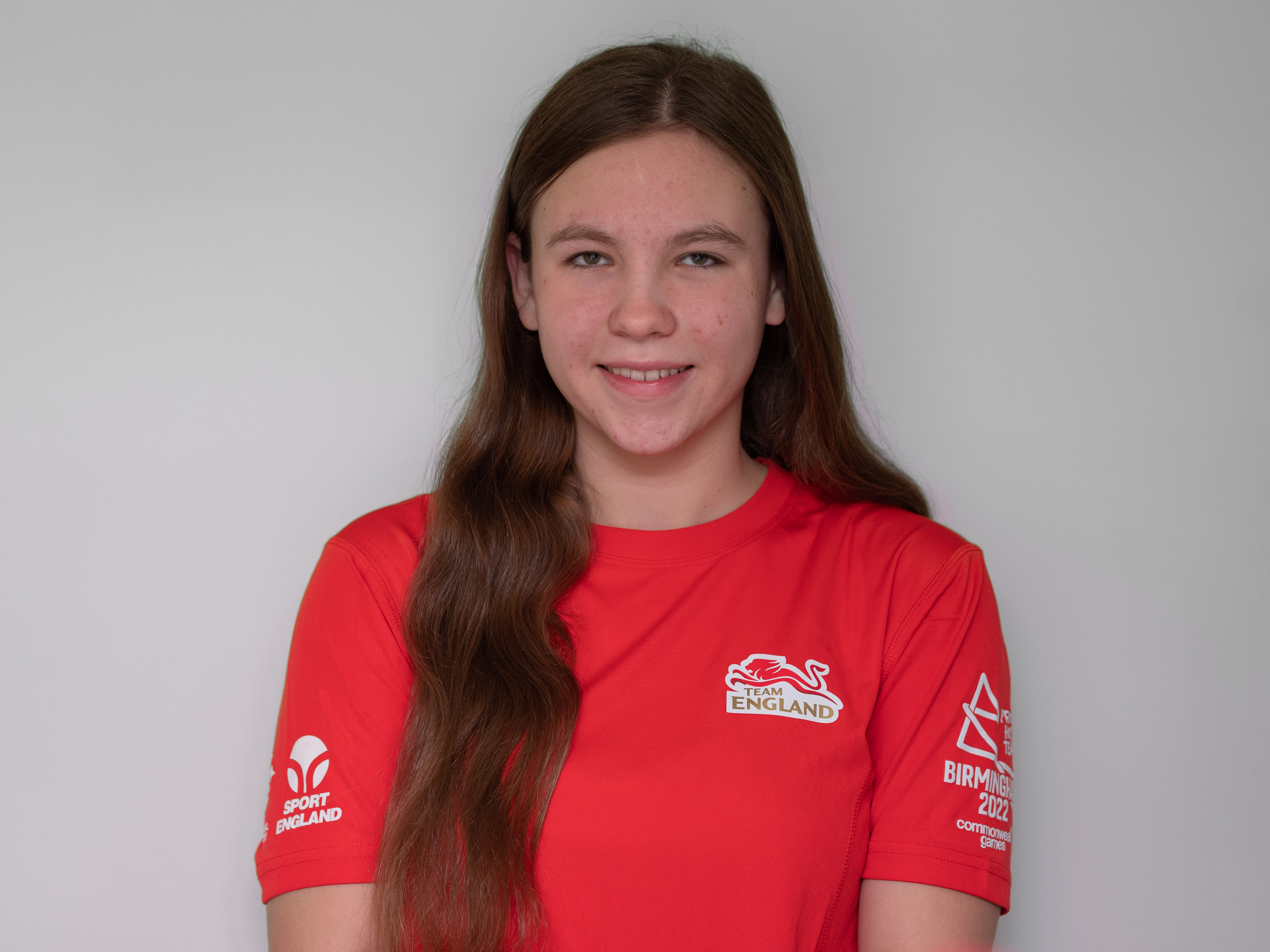

Personal information
- Nationality: British.
- Born: 8 April 2004 (age 22) Maidenhead, England

Sport
- Sport: Para swimming Para triathlon
- Disability class: S13, SM13, SB13 (Swimming) PTVI B3 (Paratriathlon)
- Club: EvoTri club, Maidenhead athletics club, and Wycombe District Swimming Club
- Coached by: Josh Atkins, Craig West,
Medal record
Women's Swimming
Representing Great Britain
Para Swimming World Series
Silver medal – second place	2019 Berlin	50m backstroke Youth MC
Women's Paratriathlon
Representing Great Britain
World Triathlon Para Cup
Silver medal – second place	2021 Alhandra	PTVI
XXII Commonwealth Games
Gold medal – first place	2022 Birmingham	PTVI
World triathlon para series
Silver medal – second place	2022 Swansea	PTVI

Katie Crowhurst (born 8 April 2004) is a British visually impaired para athlete who has competed internationally for Great Britain in both para swimming and paratriathlon.

== Personal life ==
Crowhurst is the daughter of Lucette and Andrew Crowhurst, and has a brother. Crowhurst was born with autosomal dominant congenital nystagmus and cataracts with Anterior Segment Developmental Anomalies (ASDA) with ectopia pupillae and Zonular weakness. These conditions resulted in significant visual impairment from birth. Crowhurst attended Wessex Primary School and Cox Green Secondary School in Maidenhead and went on to study A-Levels at The Henley College Oxon.

== Swimming career ==
Crowhurst's mother took her to the pool as a baby. She loved the water and was always very confident in it. When she was a toddler she attended learn to swim lessons at her local pool. By the time she was 5 she could swim some lengths in the deep pool unaided. During a family holiday to Centre Parcs in 2009 a lifeguard was impressed at the 5 year old's swimming ability and this was enough to encourage the family to enquire back home about joining the local competitive swim club. Crowhurst joined Maidenhead Marlins that September in their stroke development section. However, it wasn't until Crowhurst was 8 that she finally got a place in one of the club's competitive swim squads alongside the likes of Tom Dean.

At the age of 9, Crowhurst had her first taste of para-swimming when her parents took her to a regional disability swimming 'have a go' event. It was here that Crowhurst's talent was picked up and she was encouraged to enter the Disability Swimming Nationals that November (2013) in Sheffield. Crowhurst was the youngest swimmer there and she got disqualified in two of her 4 events and she didn't win any medals. It was a huge learning curve but she wasn't put off and In the following March (still only 9) Crowhurst attended the 2014 National Junior Disability Swimming Championships. Here Crowhurst competed only against children up to 13 and this time she had more success; she came away with 5 Gold medals.

In the Summer of 2014 Crowhurst qualified for and competed in 3 events at the ASA National Swimming Championships Youth, Open and MC and in March 2015 aged 10 She attended her first British Para Swimming International meet held in Glasgow. In December 2015 Crowhurst underwent her IPC international classification being placed in the S13, SB13 and SM13 classes. At the Berkshire and South Buckinghamshire County Swimming Championships On 6 February 2016 Crowhurst broke the British Record for the Female S13 Short Course 200m butterfly she would then go on to break the record another 4 times over the next 5 years.

In March 2016 at the British Para International meet Crowhurst made it through to 4 finals with her best result being in the Women's MC 100m back in 11th place overall. Crowhurst was able to bring this event on further by taking the bronze medal in the Women's MC 100m backstroke at the ASA English National Summer Championships 2016 held at Ponds Forge Sheffield, England - aged just 12 years old. Crowhurst retained her Women's MC 100m backstroke bronze medal position the following summer at the 2017 Swim England National Summer Meet alongside a second bronze medal in the Women's MC 200m IM.

On 14 January 2018 at the Berkshire and South Buckinghamshire County Swimming Championships Crowhurst broke the long-standing British Long Course record for the Women's SM13 400m Individual Medley. The previous record had been set 31 years before in Moscow. Crowhurst would then go on two months later to break the record again by joust over 5 seconds at the WDSC Long Course Premier Open Meet. At the Swim England National Summer Meet 2018 at 14 years old Crowhurst put on an outstanding performance to claim a Women's MC medal on every night of the 5 day competition. 100m free gold, 50m free silver, 400m free bronze, 100m fly bronze, and for a third year running 100m backstroke bronze

Crowhurst's performances of 2018 gained her selection on British Para Swimming's World Class Programmes podium Potential Squad for the 2018/2019 season. Crowhurst would remain on British Para Swimmings World Class Podium Potential Squad for a further two seasons until December 2021 where She chose to switch focus to Paratriathlon. On 27 January 2019 Crowhurst set the Women's S13 Long Course 1500m freestyle British record At the Berkshire and South Buckinghamshire County Swimming Championships. At the British Para Swimming International meet/World Series event held in Glasgow from the 25th to 28 April 2019 Crowhurst claimed Gold Medals as Top British Junior performance in both 400m freestyle and 100m backstroke. From the 6th to 9 June 2019 Crowhurst competed as part of Team GBR at the Berlin leg of the World Para Swimming World Series; here Crowhurst won an international silver medal in the Women's Youth 50m backstroke. In December 2019 Crowhurst was named as part of Great Britain's selected team for the forthcoming World Para Swimming European Championships due to be held in Madeira 17th to 23 May 2020.

Unfortunately due to the global COVID-19 pandemic the world para swimming European championships did not take place in 2020 as planned and instead in England most swimming pools closed and for periods of time throughout 2020 and 2021 people were asked to stay at home. Crowhurst had to find alternative ways to maintain her fitness during this period and she took to open water swimming, cycling and running. It was during this time that Crowhurst discovered a love for the sport of Paratriathlon.

From January 2021 to April 2021 Crowhurst moved to Manchester to train at the National Performance centre under 'stage two' of the DCMS elite sport return to training guidance. Under stage 3 of the 'elite and professional sport' DCMS guidance. Crowhurst competed in the Manchester International Swim Meet (12 to 14 February 2021), the Manchester Invitation Meet (12 to 14 March 2021) and the British Para Swimming International meet (8th to 11 April 2021) which were the first domestic swimming competitions hosted in Great Britain since the first national lockdown in March 2020.

At the British Para Swimming international Meet held at Ponds Forge Sheffield 8th to 11 April 2021 Crowhurst took 6th in the Women's MC 200m Individual Medley World Series Final, 7th in the Women's MC 100m backstroke World Series Final, 8th in the Women's MC 400m free World Series final and 5th in the Women's MC 100m Butterfly final.

At the beginning of May 2021 British Para Swimming announced a small reformed team to compete at the rescheduled World Para Swimming European Open Championships, predominantly taking athletes that needed classification before the Tokyo Paralympic Games.

The then British Para-Swimming National Performance Director Chris Furber said:

"Taking a small team to the open Europeans was a difficult decision, but the right one given the current restrictions in place and the limited training opportunities for a large part of our pathway athletes. We also recognise the disappointment for a number of athletes within the pathway that will not have the opportunity to represent Great Britain at the Open European Championships."

Unfortunately Crowhurst was not part of the new reformed team.

== Paratriathlon career ==
During the Global Coronavirus Pandemic Crowhurst had found her access to swimming pools restricted and had to find alternative ways to maintain training. This led to a mix of running, static cycling and open water swimming. Which then whetted her appetite for the sport of triathlon. Off the back of a British Paratriathlon online Talent ID Event held in April 2021 Crowhurst began discussions with British Triathlon's Paralympic Pathway Manager, who recommended Crowhurst join Evolution Triathlon Club.

Throughout late spring and early summer 2021 Crowhurst worked with Evolution Triathlon Club, Maidenhead Athletics club and Wycombe District Swimming Club to tailor a training programme suited to Paratriathlon. Crowhurst had to learn how to swim and run whilst tethered to a sighted guide, how to ride a tandem and the rules and skills of transition.

On 17 July 2021 Crowhurst raced her first ever paratriathlon at the British Paratriathlon Championships held at Eton Dorney. Crowhurst's Sighted Guide was Laura Siddall and the pair met for the first time in person on race day. The pair used a race tandem borrowed from British Triathlon, a big step up from the bike Crowhurst had used in training with Evolution Triathlon Club. Crowhurst and Siddall emerged first out of the water in the Women's PTVI race and after a gruelling cycle and run on one of the hottest days of the Summer they finished a respectful second place. On 4 September, Crowhurst competed in the 2021 School Games at Loughborough University with 14 year old Guide Anna Patterson. Patterson and Crowhurst were the first Female athletes across the finish line.

On 11 September 2021 Crowhurst raced the British Super Sprint Championships at Mallory Park with Grace France as her Guide; the pair finished 1st in the Women's PTVI category. On 30 October 2021 Crowhurst competed for Great Britain at the World Triathlon Para Cup Alhandra with guide Grace France. The pair took silver in a time of 1:11.01 despite the torrential weather conditions. A few days later Crowhurst and France flew out to Abu Dhabi for the World Para Triathlon Championships on 5 November 2021. At 17 Crowhurst was the youngest female VI athlete by 7 years. Crowhurst and France finished 6th in a time of 1:13.38.

In December 2021 Crowhurst decided to step down from British Para Swimming's World Class Programmes to concentrate on Paratriathlon leading into the Paris 2024 Paralympic Games. On Tuesday 26 April 2022 it was announced that Katie Crowhurst had been selected to represent England in Paratriathlon at the Birmingham 2022 Commonwealth Games. It is the first time PTVI has been included at a Commonwealth Games with Crowhurst and her teammates making history on 31 July 2022 at Sutton Park.

At the Birmingham 2022 Commonwealth Games Crowhurst and her guide Jessica Fullagar became Commonwealth Champions taking the gold medal in a time of 1:10.32 just over 4 minutes ahead of the Silver medal position. Canadian Jessica Tuomela with her guide Emma Skaug started the race first with a 3 minutes 19 seconds head start as the sole B1 athlete. Crowhurst's skill and endurance in the swim put her just a minute behind Tuomela by the time she and Fullagar exited the water. With a fantastic performance on the bike leg Crowhurst and Fullagar snatched the lead from Tuomela and Skaug at the beginning of lap 3 of 4. Crowhurst and Fullagar entered the run section with a 43-second advantage over Tuomela and Skaug. Crowhurst suffered a debilitating stitch towards the end of the first run lap but was able to overcome the pain and press on to an outstanding victory at the finish.

Just 6 days after the Commonwealth Games on 6 August 2022 Crowhurst competed at the World Triathlon Para Series event in Swansea guided by Grace France (Hawthorne). Crowhurst and France put on a dramatic sprint finish on the run to overtake Tuomela and Skaug to take World Series silver. With the B1 French athlete Annouck Curzillat taking gold only just over 1 minute ahead of Crowhurst

== Awards ==
On Thursday 19 November 2015, Crowhurst attended the star-studded OCS Young Sports Person Awards ceremony at City Hall in London. hosted by BBC Sport commentator and former international gymnast Gabby Logan. Crowhurst received the London and the South East Young Star Award for her achievements in swimming.

In February 2016, Crowhurst won the Berkshire Get Active Junior Sports Personality of the year award alongside Jeanette Chippington who won the overall Sports Personality of the Year award.

In November 2021, Crowhurst was awarded the Swim England South East Inspirational Athlete Award for her achievements in swimming

On 12 August 2022 a 'Golden Gateway' plaque was installed above the entrance to the swimming pool changing rooms at Wycombe leisure centre highlighting the significance the venue played in Crowhurst's sporting journey.
