= Ryan Bailie =

Australian triathlete

Personal information
- Born: 15 July 1990 (age 36) Johannesburg, South Africa
- Height: 176 cm (5 ft 9 in)
- Weight: 60 kg (132 lb)

Sport
- Country: Australia
- Club: Bunbury Triathlon Club
- Turned pro: 2011
Medal record
Men's triathlon
Representing Australia
Commonwealth Games
Bronze medal – third place	2014 Glasgow	Mixed relay

Ryan Bailie (born 15 July 1990) is an Australian triathlete. He won a bronze medal at the 2014 Commonwealth Games in the mixed relay event.

== Early life ==
Bailie was born in South Africa before moving to Bunbury, Western Australia, where he lived until age 18. His sister Ashlee is also a triathlete.

== Career ==
Bailie has competed in the ITU World Triathlon Series since 2012, with several top ten finishes, including a best finish of 5th in Auckland in 2014.

Ryan was a part of the Australian team at the 2014 Commonwealth Games in Glasgow. In the individual event he finished fifth in hot conditions. In the mixed relay, Bailie ran the anchor leg for the Australian team. In the final sprint Bailie outran Canada's Andrew Yorke to win the bronze medal, finishing one second behind Richard Murray of South Africa.

He qualified for the Australian team for the 2016 Summer Olympics in April 2016.
