= Jessica Tuomela =

Canadian Paralympic swimmer

Personal information
- Born: 3 August 1983 (age 42) Sault Ste. Marie, Ontario, Canada
- Website: www.jessicatuomela.com

Sport
- Country: Canada
- Sport: Paralympic swimming; Paratriathlon
- Disability: Retinoblastoma
- Disability class: S11, PTVI
Medal record
Representing Canada
Women's paralympic swimming
Paralympic Games
Silver medal – second place	2000 Sydney	50m freestyle S11
Parapan American Games
Gold medal – first place	2007 Rio de Janeiro	100m backstroke S11
Gold medal – first place	2007 Rio de Janeiro	100m breaststroke SB11
Silver medal – second place	2007 Rio de Janeiro	50m freestyle S11
Silver medal – second place	2007 Rio de Janeiro	100m freestyle S11
Women's paratriathlon
Commonwealth Games
Bronze medal – third place	2022 Birmingham	PTVI
World Championships
Bronze medal – third place	2019 Lausanne	PTVI
Americas Championships
Gold medal – first place	2018 Sarasota-Bradenton	PTVI
Gold medal – first place	2021 Pleasant Prairie	PTVI
Gold medal – first place	2022 Sarasota-Bradenton	PTVI
Silver medal – second place	2019 Sarasota-Bradenton	PTVI
Bronze medal – third place	2017 Sarasota	PTVI
Bronze medal – third place	2023 Sarasota	PTVI

Jessica Tuomela (born August 3, 1983) is a Canadian paralympic competitive swimmer and para triathlete who was born in Sault Ste. Marie, Ontario. She won silver in the 50-metre freestyle at the 2000 Summer Paralympics and bronze in the Women's PTVI Paratriathlon at the 2022 Commonwealth Games.

== Early life ==
Tuomela was born in Sault Ste. Marie, Ontario, to a Portuguese mother and Finnish Canadian father. She is blind as a result of retinoblastoma at the age of three. She learned to swim while at the Ross MacDonald School for the Blind and began competitive swimming at age 12. Tuomela was offered facial reconstructive surgery at age 16, but declined.

== Career ==
=== Paraswimming ===
Competing at the 2000 Summer Paralympics in Sydney, Australia, Tuomela earned a silver medal in the 50-metre freestyle as well as three sixth-place finishes in the 100 freestyle, 100-meter backstroke and 200-meter medley.

Her accomplishments merited an invitation to the 2004 Paralympic Games in Athens, Greece, where she placed fourth in the 50-meter freestyle and had two sixth-place finishes in the 100-meter freestyle and 100-meter backstroke. Tuomela also set five Canadian records in swimming. She won two gold medals in May, 2006 at the Belgian Paralympic Championships in the 50-meter breaststroke and 100-meter backstroke. She also took the silver medal in the 100-meter breaststroke.

In 1998 Tuomela was one of 35 young people from North America and Russia to win the "Yes I Can" award, which recognizes the accomplishments of people with disabilities. She was honored in Sault Ste. Marie in 1992 for her academic achievements. On September 30, 2006, Tuomela became one of the first ten inductees in the Sault Ste. Marie Walk of Fame. In 2009, she was indicted into the Sault Ste. Marie Sports Hall of Fame.

=== Paratriathlon ===
Tuomela stopped competing in para swimming in 2008. After an eight-year break from sports, she returned to compete in para triathlon. In June 2016, she competed in the ITU Nationals in Ottawa. In July 2017, Tuomela began training with former national team athlete Ellen Pennock. Guided by Pennock, Tuomela won a gold medal in the women’s visually impaired race at the Duathlon World Championships in Penticton in 2017.

In 2018, Tuomela won the World Para Triathlon Series in Edmonton with guide Lauren Babineau, becoming the first fully blind athlete to win gold in an event on the World Para Triathlon Series circuit. In 2019, she won bronze at the ITU Paratriathlon World Championship in Lausanne, Switzerland with guide Marianne Hogan. Tuomela and Hogan won bronze in the 2019 World Para-triathlon Series in the women’s visually impaired category.

At the 2021 Tokyo Paralympics, Tuomela placed fifth in the women’s visually-impaired triathlon, with Hogan. In June 2022, Tuomela and guide Emma Skaug were named to Canada's 2022 Commonwealth Games team. The pair won bronze, marking Canada’s first-ever medal in the event. Tuomela and Skaug won bronze at the 2023 World Triathlon Championship Series in Yokohama, Japan.

Tuomela retired from sport at the end of 2023.

== Personal life ==
In 2008, Tuomela stopped swimming and attended massage college. After that, she completed a Performance Psychology diploma course at the University of Edinburgh. She has a masters degree in Social Work from the University of Southern California.

Tuomela moved to Victoria, British Columbia in 2017. Tuomela has been working with dogs, training in scent discrimination to find missing persons. In May 2023, she successfully tracked an individual with dementia who had gone for a walk and didn't return.
