= Gillian Sanders =

South African triathlete

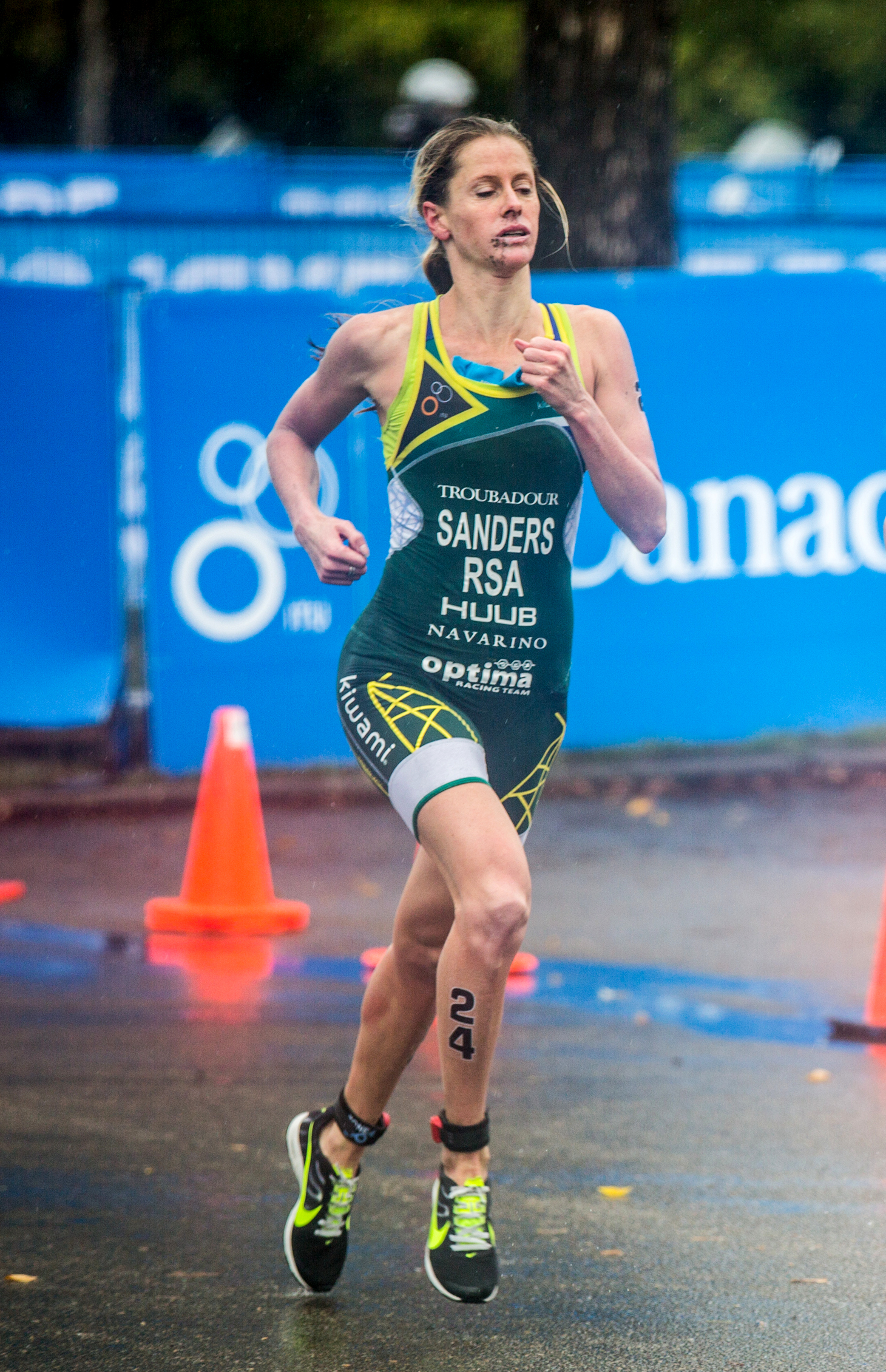
- Gillian Sanders in 2015

Personal information
- Born: 15 October 1981 (age 44) Johannesburg, South Africa
- Height: 169 cm (5 ft 7 in)
- Weight: 54 kg (119 lb)
- Website: www.gilliansanders.com

Sport
- Sport: Triathlon
- Turned pro: 2011
- Coached by: James Beckinsale
Medal record
Representing South Africa
Triathlon
Commonwealth Games
Silver medal – second place	2014 Glasgow	Mixed relay

Gillian Sanders (born 15 October 1981) is a South African triathlete. She grew up in Pietermaritzburg, and took up triathlon in her youth under the influence of her father and older sister, who both competed in the sport. After competing internationally in age group and junior competition Sanders put her triathlon career on hold whilst studying law at Stellenbosch University, where she competed as a 1500m runner. She resumed triathlon competition after graduating, combining it with legal work. Sanders chose to focus on full-time competition at the end of 2011. She competed in the Women's event at the 2012 Summer Olympics.

She competed in the women's triathlon at the 2020 Summer Olympics.
