= Kate Roberts (triathlete) =

South African triathlete

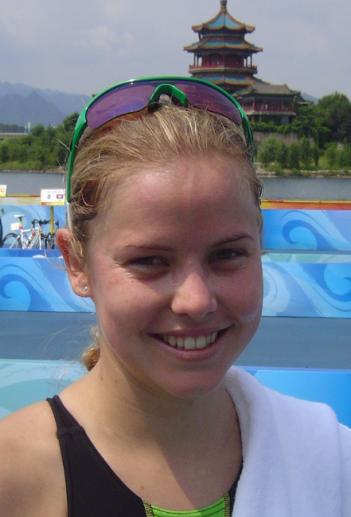
Roberts at the 2008 Summer Olympics

Kate "Katie" Roberts (born 20 June 1983) is a South African triathlete who competed in the 2008 Summer Olympics and 2012 Summer Olympics.

She was born in Bloemfontein.

In 2008, she finished 32nd in the Olympic triathlon event.

In 2012, she finished 22nd in the Olympic triathlon event.
