= Bermuda at the 2022 Commonwealth Games =

- Flag of Bermuda
- CG code: BER
- CGA: Bermuda Olympic Association
- Website: olympics.bm

in Birmingham, England 28 July 2022 – 8 August 2022
- Competitors: 17 (8 men and 9 women) in 5 sports
- Flag bearers: Dage Minors; Emma Keane
- Medals Ranked 25th: Gold 1 Silver 0 Bronze 1 Total 2

Commonwealth Games appearances (overview)
- 1930; 1934; 1938; 1950; 1954; 1958–1962; 1966; 1970; 1974; 1978; 1982; 1986; 1990; 1994; 1998; 2002; 2006; 2010; 2014; 2018; 2022; 2026; 2030

Bermuda competed at the 2022 Commonwealth Games in Birmingham, England between 28 July and 8 August 2022. Bermuda was present at the inaugural Games in 1930 and made its nineteenth appearance.

Bermuda's team of 17 athletes (eight men and nine women), competing in five sports was named on June 18, 2022.

Dage Minors and Emma Keane served as the delegation's flagbearers during the 2022 Commonwealth Games opening ceremony.

== Medalists ==
Medal	Name	Sport	Event	Date
Gold	Flora Duffy	Triathlon	Women's triathlon	29 July
Bronze	Jah-Nhai Perinchief	Athletics	Men's triple jump	7 August

== Competitors ==
Bermuda received a quota of 17 open allocation slots from Commonwealth Sport. This quota is used to determine the overall team in sports lacking a qualifying system.

The following is the list of number of competitors participating at the Games per sport/discipline.

Sport	Men	Women	Total
Athletics	2	3	5
Cycling	3	1	4
Squash	0	1	1
Swimming	1	2	3
Triathlon	2	2	4
Total	8	9	17

== Athletics ==
Three athletes were officially selected on 26 April 2022, with two more added on 13 June 2022.

Men
Track and road events

Athlete	Event	Heat		Final	
Athlete	Event	Result	Rank	Result	Rank
Dage Minors	1500 m	3:46.67	9	did not advance	

Field events

Athlete	Event	Final	
Athlete	Event	Distance	Rank
Jah-Nhai Perinchief	Triple jump	16.92	3rd place, bronze medalist(s)

Women
Track and road events

Athlete	Event	Heat		Semifinal		Final	
Athlete	Event	Result	Rank	Result	Rank	Result	Rank
Caitlyn Bobb	400 m	53.97	4	did not advance			

Field events

Athlete	Event	Qualification		Final	
Athlete	Event	Distance	Rank	Distance	Rank
Sakari Famous	High jump	1.76	15	did not advance	
Tiara Derosa	Discus throw	—N/a		45.79	11

== Cycling ==
One cyclist was officially selected on 26 April 2022; three more were added on 13 June 2022.

=== Road ===
Men

Athlete	Event	Time	Rank
Kaden Hopkins	Road race	3:32:23	14
Nicholas Narraway	Road race	3:38:11	64
Conor White	Road race	3:37:08	31
Kaden Hopkins	Time trial	50:00.27	11
Nicholas Narraway	Time trial	53:34.82	26
Conor White	Time trial	50:52.19	15

Women

Athlete	Event	Time	Rank
Caitlin Conyers	Road race	DNS	
Caitlin Conyers	Time trial	DNS	

== Squash ==
One player was officially selected on 13 June 2022.

Athlete	Event	Round of 64	Round of 32	Round of 16	Quarterfinals	Semifinals	Final	
Athlete	Event	Opposition Score	Opposition Score	Opposition Score	Opposition Score	Opposition Score	Opposition Score	Rank
Emma Keane	Women's singles	Bye	Adderley (SCO); L 0 - 3	did not advance				

== Swimming ==
Two swimmers were officially selected on 26 April 2022, with another swimmer added on 13 June 2022.

Men

Athlete	Event	Heat		Semifinal		Final	
Athlete	Event	Time	Rank	Time	Rank	Time	Rank
Jack Harvey	50 m backstroke	26.88	25	did not advance			
Jack Harvey	100 m backstroke	57.31	20	did not advance			
Jack Harvey	200 m backstroke	2:05.93	13	—N/a		Did not advance	

Women

Athlete	Event	Heat		Semifinal		Final	
Athlete	Event	Time	Rank	Time	Rank	Time	Rank
Emma Harvey	50 m backstroke	29.38	12 Q	29.27	12	did not advance	
Emma Harvey	100 m backstroke	1:04.17	15 Q	1:03.82	13	did not advance	
Emma Harvey	50 m butterfly	27.78	19	did not advance			
Emma Harvey	100 m butterfly	1:02.27	22	did not advance			
Maddy Moore	50 m freestyle	25.85	13 Q	25.72	14	did not advance	
Maddy Moore	100 m freestyle	56.98	19	Did not advance			
Maddy Moore	50 m backstroke	29.29	11 Q	29.18	11	did not advance	
Maddy Moore	100 m backstroke	1:04.84	19	did not advance			
Maddy Moore	50 m butterfly	27.33	14 Q	27.42	16	did not advance	

== Triathlon ==
On 26 April 2022, Bermuda announced a squad of four triathletes, including Tokyo 2020 champion Flora Duffy.

Individual

Athlete	Event	Swim (750 m)	Trans 1	Bike (20 km)	Trans 2	Run (5 km)	Total	Rank
Tyler Smith	Men's	8:53	0:54	26:00	0:23	16:04	52:14	13
Flora Duffy	Women's	9:22	0:55	28:17	0:19	16:32	55:25	1st place, gold medalist(s)
Erica Hawley	Women's	9:41	1:02	29:16	0:23	18:07	58:29	16

Mixed relay

Athletes	Event	Total Times per Athlete (Swim 300 m, Bike 5 km, Run 2 km)	Total Group Time	Rank
Tyler Smith; Flora Duffy; Tyler Butterfield; Erica Hawley	Mixed relay	18:38; 20:11; 19:56; 21:21	1:20:06	7
