= Bermuda at the 2018 Commonwealth Games =

- Flag of Bermuda
- CG code: BER
- CGA: Bermuda Olympic Association
- Website: olympics.bm

in Gold Coast, Australia 4 April 2018 – 15 April 2018
- Competitors: 8 in 4 sports
- Flag bearer: Tyler Smith (opening)
- Medals Ranked 26th: Gold 1 Silver 0 Bronze 0 Total 1

Commonwealth Games appearances (overview)
- 1930; 1934; 1938; 1950; 1954; 1958–1962; 1966; 1970; 1974; 1978; 1982; 1986; 1990; 1994; 1998; 2002; 2006; 2010; 2014; 2018; 2022; 2026; 2030

Bermuda competed at the 2018 Commonwealth Games in the Gold Coast, Australia from April 4 to April 15, 2018. Bermuda announced it will send a squad of 8 athletes. It was Bermuda's 18th appearance at the Commonwealth Games.

Bermuda won its first gold medal for twenty-eight years and only its second ever gold medal overall when Flora Duffy won the women’s triathlon.

Triathlete Tyler Smith was the country's flag bearer during the opening ceremony.

== Medalists ==
| Medal | Name | Sport | Event | Date |
|---|---|---|---|---|
| Gold | Flora Duffy | Triathlon | Women's triathlon | April 5 |

== Competitors ==
The following is the list of number of competitors participating at the Games per sport/discipline.

| Sport | Men | Women | Total |
|---|---|---|---|
| Athletics | 4 | 0 | 4 |
| Cycling | 0 | 1 | 1 |
| Squash | 1 | 0 | 1 |
| Triathlon | 2 | 2 | 4 |
| Total | 6* | 2* | 8 |

- Tyler Butterfield competed in athletics and triathlon while Flora Duffy competed in cycling and triathlon.

== Athletics ==
Bermuda announced a team of 4 athletes (4 men) that competed at the 2018 Commonwealth Games.

Men
Track & road events

| Athlete | Event | Heat | | Semifinal | | Final | |
| Athlete | Event | Result | Rank | Result | Rank | Result | Rank |
|---|---|---|---|---|---|---|---|
| Harold Houston | 200 m | 21.67 | 4 | Did not advance | | | |
| Kyle Webb | 200 m | 21.73 | 6 | Did not advance | | | |
| Tyler Butterfield | Marathon | —N/a | | | | 2:26:29 | 12 |

Field events

| Athlete | Event | Qualification | | Final | |
| Athlete | Event | Distance | Rank | Distance | Rank |
|---|---|---|---|---|---|
| Tyrone Smith | Long jump | 7.89 | 7 q | 7.79 | 10 |

== Cycling ==
Bermuda announced a team of 1 athlete (1 woman) that competed at the 2018 Commonwealth Games.

=== Mountain Bike ===
| Athlete | Event | Time | Rank |
|---|---|---|---|
| Flora Duffy | Women's cross-country | DNS | |

== Squash ==
Bermuda announced a team of 1 athlete (1 man) that competed at the 2018 Commonwealth Games.

Individual

| Athlete | Event | Round of 64 | Round of 32 | Round of 16 | Quarterfinals | Semifinals | Final | |
| Athlete | Event | Opposition Score | Opposition Score | Opposition Score | Opposition Score | Opposition Score | Opposition Score | Rank |
|---|---|---|---|---|---|---|---|---|
| Micah Franklin | Men's singles | James Fayia (SLE); W 3-0 | Joel Makin (WAL); L 0-3 | Did not advance | | | | |

== Triathlon ==
Bermuda announced a team of 4 athletes (2 men, 2 women) that competed at the 2018 Commonwealth Games.

Individual

| Athlete | Event | Swim (750 m) | Trans 1 | Bike (20 km) | Trans 2 | Run (5 km) | Total | Rank |
|---|---|---|---|---|---|---|---|---|
| Tyler Butterfield | Men's | 9:32 | 0:36 | 28:55 | 0:35 | 16:13 | 55:51 | 18 |
| Tyler Smith | Men's | 9:07 | 0:35 | 29:22 | 0:29 | 17:08 | 56:41 | 21 |
| Flora Duffy | Women's | 9:10 | 0:36 | 29:37 | 0:31 | 16:56 | 56:50 | 1st place, gold medalist(s) |
| Erica Hawley | Women's | 10:04 | 0:36 | 33:03 | 0:31 | 19:00 | 1:03:14 | 16 |

Mixed Relay

| Athletes | Event | Total Times per Athlete (Swim 250 m, Bike 7 km, Run 1.5 km) | Total Group Time | Rank |
|---|---|---|---|---|
| Erica Hawley; Tyler Smith; Flora Duffy; Tyler Butterfield | Mixed relay | 21:07; 19:56; 20:12; 19.29 | 1:20:44 | 5 |

== See also ==
- Bermuda at the 2018 Summer Youth Olympics
