= 2018 ITU Triathlon Mixed Relay World Championship =

Triathlon Mixed Relay World Championship 2018
- Location: Hamburg, Germany
- Date: 15 July 2018
- Nations: 20

Medalists
gold medal	France
silver medal	Australia
bronze medal	USA

The 2018 ITU Triathlon Mixed Relay World Championship was the 10th edition of the mixed relay world championships and the 6th to be held in Hamburg, Germany. The race was hosted on 15 July 2018 to coincide with the 2018 ITU World Triathlon Series Hamburg race, and featured 40 men and 40 women representing 20 countries. The race was around the Binnenalster, an artificial lake in central Hamburg. The race followed the standard mixed relay format, where each athlete would swim 300m, cycle 7 km and run 1.7 km before tagging their next teammate to do the same, with the specified gender order of female—male—female—male.

Over the first two legs a leading group would emerge but soon be recaptured multiple times. It wasn't until the third leg where a permanent lead group appeared containing the USA, France and the UK. Over the final leg Australia had a great run moving them from fourth to second after overtaking the US on the final straight, but it was France that would win after breaking clear on the cycle. This win would earn France their second world relay title.

== Course ==
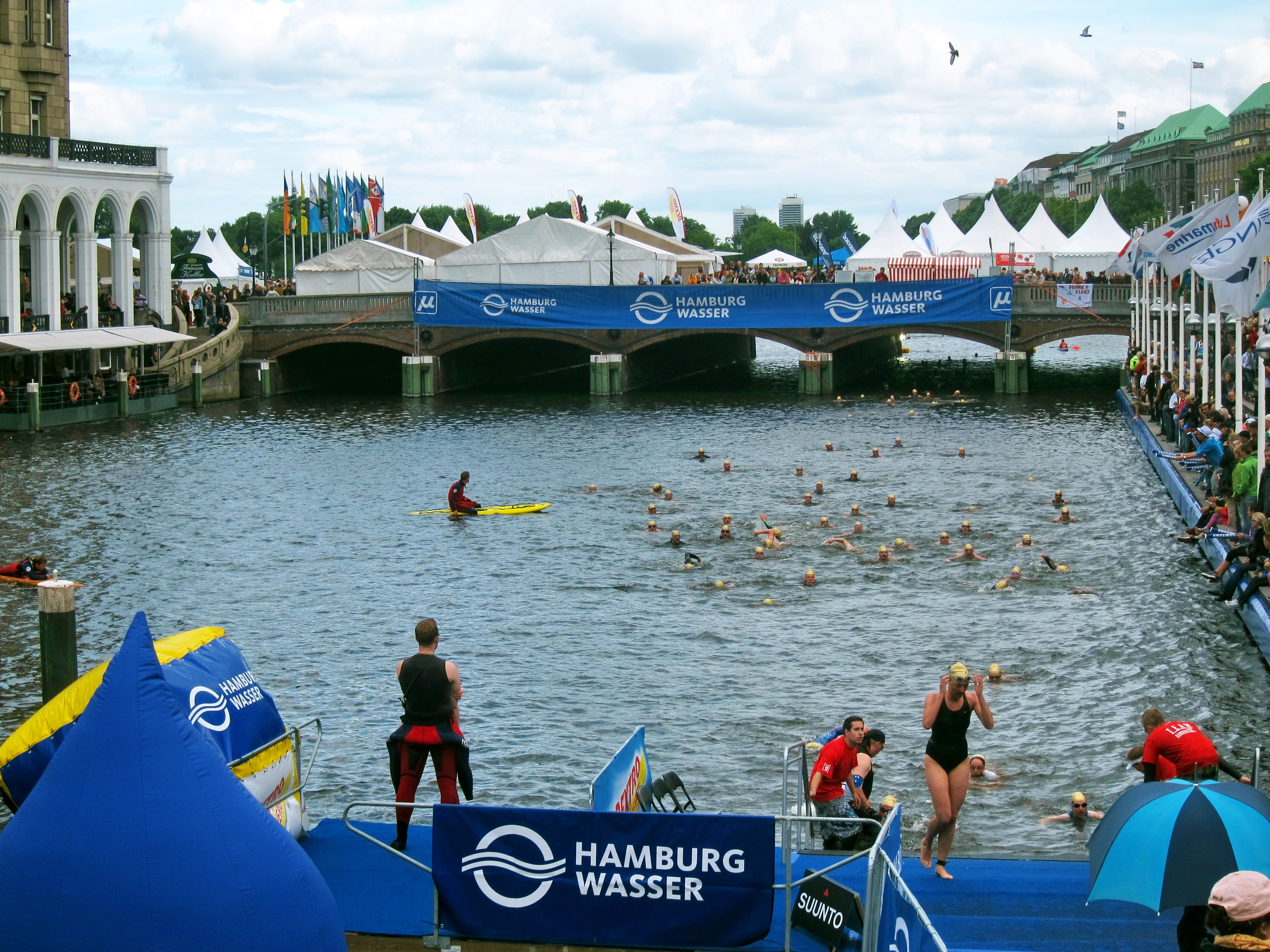
Amateur triathletes swimming under the Reesendammbrücke bridge

The event was contested in the city centre of Hamburg, for the relay each of the four athletes would complete the same course one after another. The 300m swim is an out and back course in the Alster. Due to the location of the Reesendammbrücke bridge athletes were required to pass under the bridge both going out and coming back. After the swim a short run to the transition area was required. The cycle consisted of two 3.5 km laps along a flat and technical circuit. The course held two 180° turns as well as many 90° turns with the laps mainly following the shore of the artificial lake Binnenalster. The cycle finished at the same transition area, leading to a 1.7 km run costing of two laps of differing lengths (0.95 km and 0.75 km). Both laps where mostly flat and crossed the Reesendammbrücke bridge.

The course was designed to be as spectator-friendly as possible, with the race being the most popular on the ITU's calendar pulling in crowds of over 250,000 gather most years.

== Qualification ==
The qualification was organised by the ITU however a nation wishing to compete must send a bid to the ITU at least 60 days before the competition. From all bids the ITU gives automatic qualification to the host nation, which as for the past five years has given immediate entry for the German team. The ITU also gives the top 11 nations (excluding the host) from the previous years championship automatic qualification. Then the best placed teams in each continental championship to not have already qualified gain a spot. After this all the remaining bids are listed in order of their results form their continental championship and the remaining spaces are filled from the best placed team. If any team should withdraw from the championship the best ranked team from their continent not to have qualified will replace them.

== Race report ==
Going into the race the three favourites where the current title holders — the Australian team, the winners of the most recent mixed relay the - US team, and the French team due to the previous days performances in the individual races in Hamburg, with Vincent Luis placing second and Cassandre Beaugrand gaining her first ITU win.

During the first swim the group had split in three with the UK and the Netherlands emerging a few seconds clear of a chasing group consisting of Mexico, the US, Hungary and Japan. However, over the course of the cycling all of the athletes regrouped to the point where five seconds separated first and last place. Over the first run not much separated the top contenders with the previous day's second place woman, Laura Lindermann, leading into the second leg. Over the swim and cycle of the second leg a leading pack of four emerged consisting of France, Germany, the UK and the US with a twenty-second advantage. Over the run the group shattered with Dorian Coninx of France pulling away and Jonas Schomburg of Germany falling back. Such was the split as at the start of the third leg where France had a six-second lead over second place and a twenty five second lead over third. During the swim and bike of the third leg the leading pack of four reformed but with Japan replacing Germany. Then the run the group again split with France leading. A large enough gap was never established with France two seconds ahead of the US in second, eleven seconds ahead of the UK in third and forty seconds clear of fifth place Australia. The gaps remained over the final swim until the bike leg where Luis of France took the lead from Kevin McDowell of the US. Similarly, Jacob Birtwhistle of Australia chased his way into third. Luis maintained his lead earning the win for France whilst Birtwhistle of Australia chased down McDowell overtaking him in the last 100m to take second for Australia, leaving third for the US.

== Results ==
Pos	Team	Total	Leg 1	Leg 2	Leg 3	Leg 4
1	France	01:20:06	00:20:50	00:18:54	00:21:07	00:19:16
2	Australia	01:20:49	00:21:03	00:19:19	00:21:10	00:19:19
3	United States	01:20:51	00:20:57	00:19:13	00:20:44	00:20:00
4	Great Britain	01:21:09	00:20:51	00:19:00	00:21:11	00:20:08
5	Netherlands	01:21:24	00:20:58	00:19:33	00:21:12	00:19:43
6	Germany	01:21:29	00:20:49	00:19:32	00:21:22	00:19:47
7	Japan	01:21:32	00:21:04	00:19:09	00:21:09	00:20:12
8	Switzerland	01:21:40	00:21:03	00:19:20	00:21:16	00:20:02
9	Italy	01:21:47	00:20:54	00:19:20	00:21:29	00:20:06
10	Canada	01:22:20	00:21:20	00:19:20	00:21:14	00:20:27
11	New Zealand	01:23:04	00:21:45	00:19:39	00:21:52	00:19:49
12	Spain	01:23:05	00:21:17	00:19:45	00:22:21	00:19:44
13	Hungary	01:23:21	00:21:32	00:19:27	00:22:16	00:20:07
14	Russia	01:23:36	00:21:18	00:19:48	00:22:22	00:20:09
15	South Africa	01:23:54	00:21:18	00:19:12	00:22:46	00:20:39
16	Brazil	01:24:18	00:21:27	00:20:13	00:22:04	00:20:36
17	Denmark	01:24:29	00:22:04	00:19:36	00:22:22	00:20:29
LAP	Belgium	LAP	00:23:17	00:19:19	00:22:14	Lapped Out
LAP	Mexico	LAP	00:21:45	00:20:12	00:22:49	Lapped Out
DSQ	Ukraine	DSQ	00:22:42	00:21:13	Disqualified	

=== Teams ===
1. France: Leonie Periault, Dorian Coninx, Cassandre Beaugrand, Vincent Luis.
2. Australia: Natalie Van Coevorden, Aaron Royle, Ashleigh Gentle, Jacob Birtwhistle.
3. United States: Kirsten Kasper, Ben Kanute, Katie Zaferes, Kevin McDowell.

=== Technical notes ===
- The water temperature was 20.9 °C, thus prohibiting the use of wetsuits.
- Team #21 Ukraine was disqualified because they did not follow the prescribed course.
- Teams #14 Russia, #15 Hungary and #16 Italy served a ten seconds penalty during the run segment of the 4th leg.
