= Bermuda at the 2006 Commonwealth Games =

- CGF code: BER
- CGA: Bermuda Olympic Association
- Website: olympics.bm

in Melbourne, Australia
- Competitors: 26 Athletes in 8 sports
- Flag bearers: Opening: Closing:
- Officials: 18
- Medals: Gold 0 Silver 0 Bronze 0 Total 0

Commonwealth Games appearances (overview)
- 1930; 1934; 1938; 1950; 1954; 1958–1962; 1966; 1970; 1974; 1978; 1982; 1986; 1990; 1994; 1998; 2002; 2006; 2010; 2014; 2018; 2022; 2026; 2030

Team pin

Bermuda was represented at the 2006 Commonwealth Games in Melbourne by a 44–member strong contingent comprising 26 sportspersons and 18 officials.

== Medals ==
	(gold)	(silver)	(bronze)	Total
Bermuda	0	0	0	0

== Athletes ==
=== Athletics ===
- Ashley Couper, track
- Latroya Darrell, high jump
- Michael Donawa, track
- Arantxa King, long jump
- Zindzi Swan, high jump

=== Cycling (Road) ===
- Tyler Barbour Butterfield
- Julia Lesley Hawley
- Geri Bryan Mewett

=== Diving ===
- Katura Chenoa Horton-Perinchief

=== Gymnastics (Artistic) ===
- Kalena Noelle Astwood
- Kaisey Marie Griffith
- Hannah Meriwether King
- Casey Marie Lopes
- Caitlyn Mello Mello

=== Shooting ===
- Sinclair Charles Rayner
- Ross Gladwin Eugene Roberts
- Nelson Chesterfield Simons
- Stewart Harry Walter Trott

=== Squash ===
- Nicholas Kyme
- James Stout

=== Swimming ===
- Kiera Aitken
- Ronald Cowen
- Michael O'Connor
- Graham Smith

=== Triathlon ===
- Flora Jane Duffy
- Karen Denise Smith
