= Bermuda at the 2014 Commonwealth Games =

- CG code: BER
- CGA: Bermuda Olympic Association
- Website: olympics.bm

in Glasgow, Scotland
- Competitors: 18 in 6 sports
- Flag bearer: Micah Franklin
- Medals: Gold 0 Silver 0 Bronze 0 Total 0

Commonwealth Games appearances (overview)
- 1930; 1934; 1938; 1950; 1954; 1958–1962; 1966; 1970; 1974; 1978; 1982; 1986; 1990; 1994; 1998; 2002; 2006; 2010; 2014; 2018; 2022; 2026; 2030

Bermuda competed in the 2014 Commonwealth Games in Glasgow, Scotland from 23 July – 3 August 2014. A team of eighteen athletes in six sports was announced on 20 June 2014.

== Athletics ==
Men

Athlete	Event	Heats		Semifinal		Final	
Athlete	Event	Result	Rank	Result	Rank	Result	Rank
Harold Houston	100 m	10.72	38	did not advance			
Harold Houston	200 m	21.39	41	did not advance			
Aaron Evans	800 m	1:50.48	14 Q	1:50.17	14	did not advance	
Shaquille Dill	800 m	1:49.61	13 q	1:48.59	12	did not advance	

Field event

Athlete	Event	Qualification		Final	
Athlete	Event	Distance	Position	Distance	Position
Tyrone Smith	Long jump	7.87	7 q	7.79	8

Women
Field event

Athlete	Event	Qualification		Final	
Athlete	Event	Distance	Position	Distance	Position
Arantxa King	Long jump	6.02	21	did not advance	

Combined events – Heptathlon

Athlete	Event	100H	HJ	SP	200 m	LJ	JT	800 m	Final	Rank
Shianne Smith	Result	14.95	1.54	11.83	25.23	5.24	38.24	2:14.73	5187	8
Shianne Smith	Points	848	666	650	866	626	634	897	5187	8

Key

- Note–Ranks given for track events are within the athlete's heat only
- Q = Qualified for the next round
- q = Qualified for the next round as a fastest loser or, in field events, by position without achieving the qualifying target
- NR = National record
- N/A = Round not applicable for the event
- Bye = Athlete not required to compete in round

== Cycling ==
=== Road ===
Athlete	Event	Time	Rank
Dominique Mayho	Men's road race	DNF	
Dominique Mayho	Men's time trial	56:54.73	26
Nicole Mitchell	Women's road race	DNF	
Nicole Mitchell	Women's time trial	48:33.06	21

== Gymnastics ==
=== Rhythmic ===
Individual

Athlete	Event	Qualification						Final					
Athlete	Event	Hoop	Ball	Clubs	Ribbon	Total	Rank	Hoop	Ball	Clubs	Ribbon	Total	Rank
Gemma Lightbourne	Individual	8.825	8.225	8.725	7.550	33.325	29	did not advance					

== Squash ==
Individual

Athlete	Event	Round of 128	Round of 64	Round of 32	Round of 16	Quarterfinals	Semifinals	Final
Athlete	Event	Opposition Score	Opposition Score	Opposition Score	Opposition Score	Opposition Score	Opposition Score	Opposition Score
Micah Franklin	Men's Singles	Bye	M Kawooya (UGA); W 3-2	C Grayson (NZL); L 0-3	did not advance			
Robert Maycock	Men's Singles	Bye	M Adnan (MAS); L 0-3	did not advance				
Nicholas Kyme	Men's Singles	Bye	J Willstrop (ENG); L 0-3	did not advance				

Doubles

Athlete	Event	Group Stage			Round of 16	Quarterfinal	Semifinal	Final	
Athlete	Event	Opposition Score	Opposition Score	Rank	Opposition Score	Opposition Score	Opposition Score	Opposition Score	Rank
Micah Franklin; Nicholas Kyme	Men's doubles	New Zealand; L 0 - 2	Sierra Leone; W w/o	2 Q	Australia; L 0 - 2	did not advance			

== Swimming ==
Men

Athlete	Event	Heat		Semifinal		Final	
Athlete	Event	Time	Rank	Time	Rank	Time	Rank
Roy-Allan Burch	50 m freestyle	22.68	9 Q	22.71	11	did not advance	
Roy-Allan Burch	100 m freestyle	50.84	16 Q	50.26	11	did not advance	
Julian Fletcher	100 m breaststroke	1:04.92	16 Q	1:04.48	15	did not advance	

== Triathlon ==
Athlete	Event	Swim (1.5 km)	Trans 1	Bike (40 km)	Trans 2	Run (10 km)	Total Time	Rank
Tucker Murphy	Men's	25:45	0:47	Lapped				
Tyler Butterfield	Men's	19:00	0:40	1:01:12	0:26	34:13	1:55:31	19
Jonathan Herring	Men's	23:20	0:41	Lapped				
Flora Duffy	Women's	19:45	0:34	1:03:52	0:27	37:40	2:02:18	8
