= 2019 ITU Triathlon Mixed Relay World Championship =

Triathlon Mixed Relay World Championship 2019
- Location: Hamburg, Germany
- Date: 7 July 2019
- Nations: 16

Medalists
| gold medal | France |
| silver medal | Germany |
| bronze medal | Australia |

The 2019 ITU Triathlon Mixed Relay World Championship was the 11th edition of the mixed relay world championships and the 7th to be held in Hamburg, Germany. The race was hosted on 7 July 2019 to coincide with the 2019 ITU World Triathlon Series Hamburg race, and featured 32 men and 32 women representing 16 countries. The race was around the Binnenalster, an artificial lake in central Hamburg. The race followed the standard mixed relay format, where each athlete would swim 300m, cycle 7 km and run 1.7 km before tagging their next teammate to do the same, with the specified gender order of female—male—female—male.

== Course ==
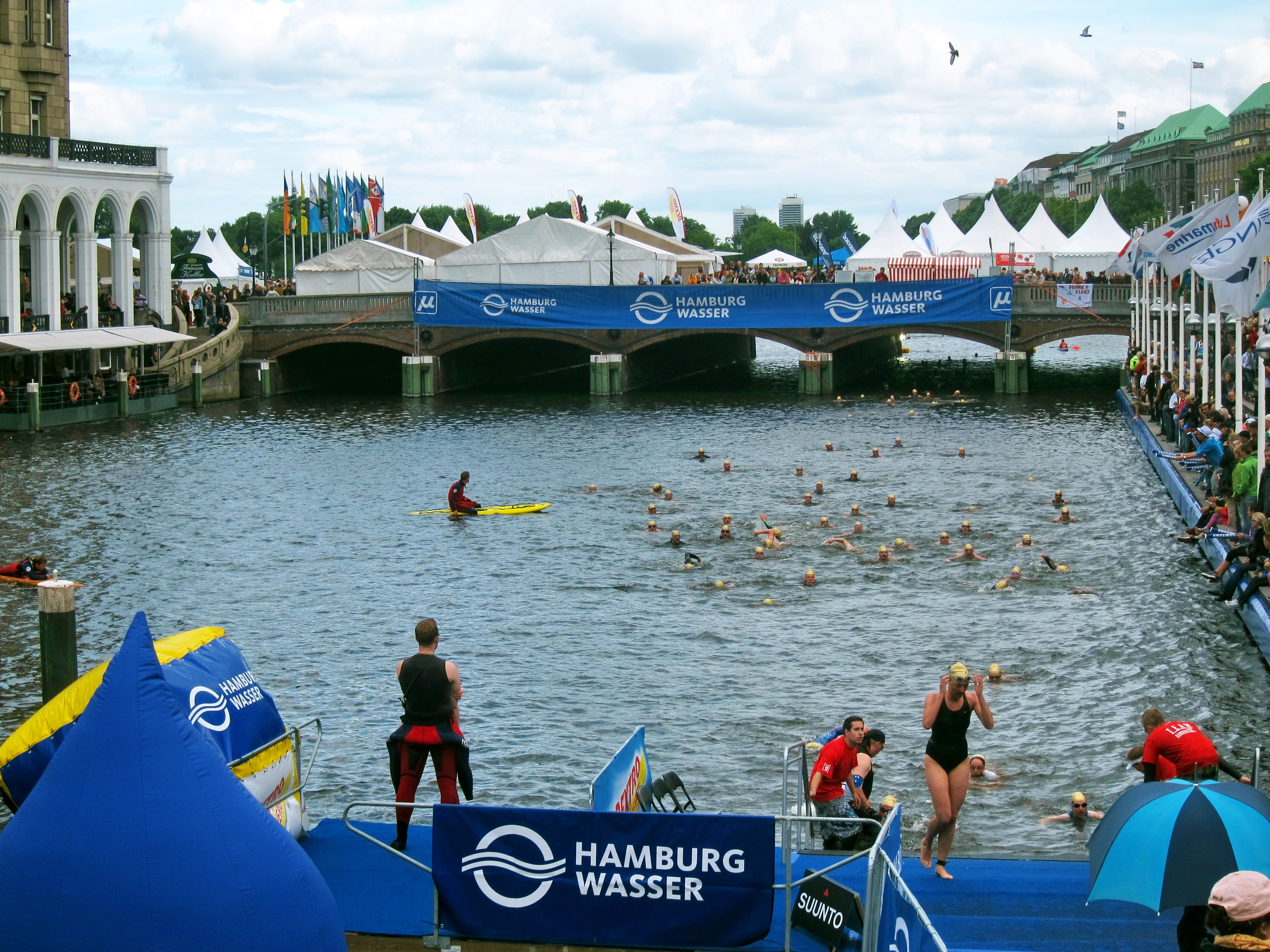
Amateur triathletes swimming under the Reesendammbrücke bridge

The event was contested in the city centre of Hamburg, for the relay each of the four athletes would complete the same course one after another. The 300m swim is an out and back course in the Alster. Due to the location of the Reesendammbrücke bridge athletes were required to pass under the bridge both going out and coming back. After the swim a short run to the transition area was required. The cycle consisted of two 3.5 km laps along a flat and technical circuit. The course held two 180° turns as well as many 90° turns with the laps mainly following the shore of the artificial lake Binnenalster. The cycle finished at the same transition area, leading to a 1.7 km run costing of two laps of differing lengths (0.95 km and 0.75 km). Both laps where mostly flat and crossed the Reesendammbrücke bridge.

The course was designed to be as spectator-friendly as possible, with the race being the most popular on the ITU's calendar pulling in crowds of over 250,000 gather most years.

== Qualification ==
The qualification was organised by the ITU however a nation wishing to compete must send a bid to the ITU at least 60 days before the competition. From all bids the ITU gives automatic qualification to the host nation, which as for the past six years has given immediate entry for the German team. The ITU also gives the top 11 nations (excluding the host) from the previous years championship automatic qualification. Then the best placed teams in each continental championship to not have already qualified gain a spot. After this all the remaining bids are listed in order of their results form their continental championship and the remaining spaces are filled from the best placed team. If any team should withdraw from the championship the best ranked team from their continent not to have qualified will replace them.

== Results ==
| Pos | Team | Total | Leg 1 | Leg 2 | Leg 3 | Leg 4 |
| 1 | France | 01:20:18 | 00:21:14 | 00:18:52 | 00:21:21 | 00:18:52 |
| 2 | Germany | 01:20:22 | 00:20:54 | 00:19:21 | 00:21:18 | 00:18:50 |
| 3 | Australia | 01:20:43 | 00:21:06 | 00:19:05 | 00:21:26 | 00:19:08 |
| 4 | New Zealand | 01:20:46 | 00:21:16 | 00:18:54 | 00:21:22 | 00:19:15 |
| 5 | Canada | 01:21:08 | 00:21:15 | 00:18:57 | 00:21:26 | 00:19:32 |
| 6 | Spain | 01:21:13 | 00:21:05 | 00:19:11 | 00:21:21 | 00:19:38 |
| 7 | Belgium | 01:21:20 | 00:21:06 | 00:18:59 | 00:21:27 | 00:19:49 |
| 8 | Netherlands | 01:21:56 | 00:21:02 | 00:19:22 | 00:21:30 | 00:20:03 |
| 9 | United States | 01:22:07 | 00:21:09 | 00:19:59 | 00:20:54 | 00:20:06 |
| 10 | Great Britain | 01:22:47 | 00:21:59 | 00:19:20 | 00:21:32 | 00:19:57 |
| 11 | Japan | 01:23:06 | 00:21:43 | 00:19:43 | 00:21:54 | 00:19:47 |
| 12 | Italy | 01:23:17 | 00:21:31 | 00:19:34 | 00:22:09 | 00:20:04 |
| 13 | Russia | 01:24:44 | 00:21:43 | 00:20:01 | 00:22:18 | 00:20:44 |
| LAP | Switzerland | LAP | 00:23:33 | 00:20:18 | 00:21:44 | 00:00:00 |
| LAP | Mexico | LAP | 00:22:59 | 00:20:50 | 00:00:00 | 00:00:00 |
| LAP | South Africa | LAP | 00:21:38 | 00:19:57 | 00:22:51 | 00:00:00 |

=== Teams ===
1. France: Emilie Morier, Léo Bergere, Cassandre Beaugrand, Vincent Luis.
2. Germany: Laura Lindemann, Valentin Wernz, Nina Eim, Justus Nieschlag.
3. Australia: Natalie Van Coevorden, Aaron Royle, Emma Jeffcoat, Jacob Birtwhistle.

=== Technical notes ===
- The water temperature was 18.1 °C, thus allowing the use of wetsuits.
- Teams #15 Spain served a ten seconds penalty during the run segment of the 4th leg.
