= Triathlon at the 2022 Commonwealth Games – Women's =

Women's triathlon at the 2022 Commonwealth Games
- Venue: Sutton Park, Birmingham, United Kingdom
- Date: 29 July 2022
- Competitors: 33 from 17 nations
- Winning time: 55:25

Medalists
gold medal	Flora Duffy	Bermuda
silver medal	Georgia Taylor-Brown	England
bronze medal	Beth Potter	Scotland

The women's triathlon is part of the Triathlon at the 2022 Commonwealth Games program. The competition was held on 29 July 2022 at Sutton Park, Birmingham.

== Schedule ==
All times are British Summer Time (UTC+1)

Date	Time	Round
Friday 29 July 2022	14:31	Race

== Competition format ==
The race was once again held over the "sprint distance" and consisted of swimming, road bicycling, and road running.

=== Field ===
Current Olympic gold and silver medalists Flora Duffy of Bermuda and Georgia Taylor-Brown of England entered as pre-race favourites. Duffy also returns as 2018 Commonwealth Games champion.

=== Results ===
Rank	Bib	CGF	Name	Swim	T1	Bike	T2	Run	Total	Gap
1st place, gold medalist(s)	1	Bermuda	Flora Duffy	09:22	00:55	28:17	00:19	16:32	55:25	
2nd place, silver medalist(s)	2	England	Georgia Taylor-Brown	09:25	00:56	28:14	00:20	17:11	56:06	+0:41
3rd place, bronze medalist(s)	4	Scotland	Beth Potter	09:20	00:52	29:22	00:19	16:53	56:46	+1:21
4	3	England	Sophie Coldwell	09:26	00:58	29:08	00:20	17:14	57:06	+1:41
5	17	Australia	Sophie Linn	09:37	00:57	29:20	00:24	16:50	57:08	+1:43
6	7	Wales	Non Stanford	09:32	00:55	29:29	00:21	16:53	57:10	+1:45
7	10	Wales	Olivia Mathias	09:30	00:57	29:27	00:20	17:05	57:19	+1:54
8	15	South Africa	Simone Ackerman	09:30	01:00	29:27	00:20	17:02	57:19	+1:54
9	8	New Zealand	Nicole van der Kaay	09:40	01:04	29:12	00:20	17:08	57:24	+1:59
10	9	Canada	Emy Legault	09:30	00:55	29:09	00:21	17:36	57:31	+2:06
11	12	Australia	Charlotte McShane	09:36	00:57	29:23	00:19	17:27	57:42	+2:17
12	5	England	Sian Rainsley	09:37	00:55	29:23	00:19	17:40	57:54	+2:29
13	14	Canada	Dominika Jamnicky	09:47	00:58	29:12	00:20	17:43	58:00	+2:35
14	6	Australia	Natalie van Coevorden	09:28	00:59	29:29	00:20	17:45	58:01	+2:36
15	22	Canada	Amelie Kretz	09:40	01:04	29:11	00:18	17:50	58:03	+2:38
16	19	Bermuda	Erica Hawley	09:41	01:02	29:16	00:23	18:07	58:29	+3:04
17	21	Scotland	Sophia Green	09:39	00:59	29:20	00:22	18:13	58:33	+3:08
18	18	New Zealand	Andrea Hansen	10:09	01:00	30:41	00:20	17:44	59:54	+4:29
19	23	Wales	Issy Morris	09:49	00:57	31:04	00:24	18:02	01:00:16	+4:51
20	16	South Africa	Shanae Williams	09:41	01:02	31:08	00:23	18:44	01:00:58	+5:33
21	20	South Africa	Hannah Newman	10:12	01:02	32:53	00:21	19:40	01:04:08	+8:43
22	25	Mauritius	Julie Staub	11:15	01:20	32:47	00:28	19:43	01:05:33	+10:08
23	29	Namibia	Anri Krugel	11:51	01:08	32:23	00:25	20:09	01:05:56	+10:31
24	27	Namibia	Imke Jagau	12:16	01:09	32:17	00:20	20:10	01:06:12	+10:47
25	26	Malta	Danica Bonello Spiteri	11:16	01:09	33:04	00:31	21:21	01:07:21	+11:56
26	24	India	Pragnya Mohan	11:26	01:11	32:53	00:25	21:32	01:07:27	+12:02
27	33	Trinidad and Tobago	Jenna Ross	11:39	01:44	33:15	00:25	20:42	01:07:45	+12:20
28	28	India	Sanjana Sunil Joshi	11:16	00:52	33:21	00:27	23:04	01:09:00	+13:35
29	32	Cyprus	Stavri Pericleous	11:02	01:36	37:55	00:40	19:23	01:10:36	+15:11
30	30	Kenya	Aisha Nasser Baksh	12:31	01:24	36:24	00:44	22:13	01:13:16	+17:51
31	34	Solomon Islands	Andriana Tukuvia	14:59	01:19	45:34	00:28	29:33	01:31:53	+36:28
32	31	Ghana	Mercy Jane Adorkor Pappoe	22:41	01:30	45:26	00:40	31:29	01:41:46	+46:21
DNS	11	New Zealand	Ainsley Thorpe							
