= Triathlon at the 2018 Commonwealth Games – Women's =

Women's triathlon at the 2018 Commonwealth Games
- Venue: Southport Broadwater Parklands
- Date: 5 April 2018
- Competitors: 25 from 14 nations
- Winning time: 56:50

Medalists
gold medal	Flora Duffy	Bermuda
silver medal	Jessica Learmonth	England
bronze medal	Joanna Brown	Canada

The women's triathlon was part of the Triathlon at the 2018 Commonwealth Games program. The competition was held on 5 April 2018 in the Southport Broadwater Parklands.

== Schedule ==
All times are Australian Eastern Standard Time (UTC+10)

Date	Time	Round
Thursday 5 April 2018	09:31	Race

== Competition format ==
The race was held over the "sprint distance" and consisted of 750 metres (0.47 mi) swimming, 20 kilometres (12 mi) road bicycling, and 5 kilometres (3.1 mi) road running.

== Results ==
Rank	#	Triathlete	Swimming	T1	Cycling	T2	Running	Total time	Difference
1st place, gold medalist(s)	1	Flora Duffy (BER)	09:10	00:36	29:37	00:31	16:56	56:50	–
2nd place, silver medalist(s)	4	Jessica Learmonth (ENG)	09:04	00:39	29:40	00:30	17:40	57:33	+0:43
3rd place, bronze medalist(s)	5	Joanna Brown (CAN)	09:48	00:37	30:12	00:30	16:31	57:38	+0:48
4	12	Vicky Holland (ENG)	09:47	00:37	30:11	00:33	16:34	57:42	+0:52
5	2	Ashleigh Gentle (AUS)	09:48	00:35	30:13	00:28	17:04	58:08	+1:18
6	9	Sophie Coldwell (ENG)	09:17	00:35	30:44	00:26	17:17	58:19	+1:29
7	11	Nicole van der Kaay (NZL)	09:46	00:34	30:15	00:27	17:29	58:31	+1:41
8	8	Non Stanford (WAL)	09:50	00:37	30:09	00:30	17:39	58:45	+1:55
9	7	Gillian Backhouse (AUS)	09:34	00:36	30:25	00:27	17:52	58:54	+2:04
10	16	Rebecca Spence (NZL)	09:46	00:38	30:13	00:28	18:07	59:12	+2:22
11	6	Charlotte McShane (AUS)	09:47	00:36	30:13	00:26	18:18	59:20	+2:30
12	17	Beth Potter (SCO)	09:50	00:37	31:28	00:31	17:24	59:50	+3:00
13	3	Andrea Hewitt (NZL)	09:59	00:37	31:16	00:29	18:27	1:00:48	+3:58
14	14	Dominika Jamnicky (CAN)	09:57	00:38	31:18	00:29	18:46	1:01:08	+4:18
15	10	Gillian Sanders (RSA)	10:01	00:39	33:04	00:29	18:53	1:03:06	+6:16
16	19	Erica Hawley (BER)	10:04	00:36	33:03	00:31	19:00	1:03:14	+6:24
17	18	Desirae Ridenour (CAN)	10:04	00:35	32:24	00:27	20:16	1:03:46	+6:56
18	15	Simone Ackermann (RSA)	09:46	00:39	34:53	00:30	20:05	1:05:53	+9:03
19	26	Jennifer Newbery (IOM)	11:08	00:42	33:28	00:27	21:33	1:07:18	+10:28
20	25	Rachel James (PNG)	11:38	00:46	34:48	00:38	22:30	1:10:20	+13:30
21	22	Jenna Ross (TTO)	12:43	00:48	34:46	00:31	21:37	1:10:25	+13:35
22	20	Llori Sharpe (JAM)	11:45	00:51	36:39	00:37	22:06	1:11:58	+15:08
23	24	Hanifa Said (KEN)	14:28	00:45	36:15	00:46	23:04	1:15:18	+18:28
24	21	Chen Yin Yang (MAS)	11:08	00:46	38:41	00:41	24:56	1:16:13	+19:23
