= Bermuda at the 1986 Commonwealth Games =

- Flag of Bermuda
- CG code: BER
- CGA: Bermuda Olympic Association

in Edinburgh, Scotland
- Medals: Gold 0 Silver 0 Bronze 0 Total 0

Commonwealth Games appearances (overview)
- 1930; 1934; 1938; 1950; 1954; 1958–1962; 1966; 1970; 1974; 1978; 1982; 1986; 1990; 1994; 1998; 2002; 2006; 2010; 2014; 2018; 2022; 2026; 2030

In light of the British Government policy of maintaining sporting links with apartheid South Africa (which was subject to a general sporting boycott at the time), Bermuda did not decide until late whether to join what was a significant boycott of the 1986 Commonwealth Games in Edinburgh, Scotland. The team took part in the Opening Ceremony but withdrew from the Games the following day.
