= Lionel Hiffler =

French triathlete

Personal information
- Born: 29 October 1973 (age 52)

Sport
- Country: France
Medal record
Triathlon
Representing France
ITU Team Triathlon World Championships
Gold medal – first place	2014 Edmonton, Canada	Men's PT3

Lionel Hiffler (born October 29, 1973) is a French paratriathlete. He is champion of France and world champion of paratriathlon PT3 in 2014.

== Prize list ==
- 2014 ITU World Triathlon Grand Final Edmonton (PT3) Edmonton, Canada 1st place
- 2014 FRA Paratriathlon National Championships (PT3) La Ferté Bernard, France 1st place
- 2014 Magog ITU World Paratriathlon Event (PT3) Magog, Canada 2nd place
- 2014 Iseo - Franciacorta ITU World Paratriathlon Event (PT3) Iseo - Franciacorta, Italy 2nd place
- 2014 Besançon ITU World Paratriathlon Event (PT3) Besancon, France 2nd place
- 2013 FRA Paratriathlon National Championships (TRI-4) Besançon, France 3rd place
- 2010 Dextro Energy Triathlon - ITU World Championship Series London (TRI-4) London, Great Britain 1st place
