= 2016 ITU World Triathlon Series =

- League: ITU World Triathlon Series
- Sport: Triathlon

Men's Series
- Series Champion: Mario Mola (ESP)
- Points: 4819

Women's Series
- Series Champion: Flora Duffy (BER)
- Points: 4691

World Triathlon Series seasons
- 2015 2017

The 2016 ITU World Triathlon Series was a series of nine World Championship Triathlon events that lead up to a Grand Final held in Cozumel. The Series was organised under the auspices of the world governing body of triathlon, the International Triathlon Union (ITU).

== Calendar ==
The 2016 series visited nine cities around the world. This figure, one lower than 2015, due to the triathlon at Rio 2016.

Date	Location	Status
March 5–6	(United Arab Emirates) Abu Dhabi	
April 10	(Australia) Gold Coast	
April 23–24	(South Africa) Cape Town	Sprint distance
May 14–15	(Japan) Yokohama	
June 11–12	(United Kingdom) Leeds	
July 2–3	(Sweden) Stockholm	
July 16–17	(Germany) Hamburg	inc. World Relay
September 3–4	(Canada) Edmonton	Sprint distance
September 11–18	(Mexico) Cozumel	Grand Final

== Results ==
=== Medal summary ===
==== Men ====
Event	Gold	Silver	Bronze
Abu Dhabi	Mario Mola (ESP)	Richard Murray (RSA)	Joao Silva (POR)
Gold Coast	Mario Mola (ESP)	Fernando Alarza (ESP)	Jonathan Brownlee (GBR)
Cape Town	Fernando Alarza (ESP)	Jonathan Brownlee (GBR)	Dorian Coninx (FRA)
Yokohama	Mario Mola (ESP)	Crisanto Grajales (MEX)	Kristian Blummenfelt (NOR)
Leeds	Alistair Brownlee (GBR)	Jonathan Brownlee (GBR)	Aaron Royle (AUS)
Stockholm	Alistair Brownlee (GBR)	Jonathan Brownlee (GBR)	Pierre Le Corre (FRA)
Hamburg	Mario Mola (ESP)	Jacob Birtwhistle (AUS)	Fernando Alarza (ESP)
Edmonton	Jonathan Brownlee (GBR)	Mario Mola (ESP)	Richard Murray (RSA)
Cozumel	Henri Schoeman (RSA)	Jonathan Brownlee (GBR)	Alistair Brownlee (GBR)

==== Women ====
Event	Gold	Silver	Bronze
Abu Dhabi	Jodie Stimpson (GBR)	Ashleigh Gentle (AUS)	Helen Jenkins (GBR)
Gold Coast	Helen Jenkins (GBR)	Gwen Jorgensen (USA)	Andrea Hewitt (NZL)
Cape Town	Non Stanford (GBR)	Jodie Stimpson (GBR)	Flora Duffy (BER)
Yokohama	Gwen Jorgensen (USA)	Ashleigh Gentle (AUS)	Ai Ueda (JPN)
Leeds	Gwen Jorgensen (USA)	Flora Duffy (BER)	Vicky Holland (GBR)
Stockholm	Flora Duffy (BER)	Andrea Hewitt (NZL)	Helen Jenkins (GBR)
Hamburg	Katie Zaferes (USA)	Rachel Klamer (NED)	Gwen Jorgensen (USA)
Edmonton	Summer Cook (USA)	Sarah True (USA)	Katie Zaferes (USA)
Cozumel	Flora Duffy (BER)	Gwen Jorgensen (USA)	Charlotte McShane (AUS)

== Overall standings ==
The athlete who accumulates the most points throughout the 8 race season is declared the year's world champion. The final point standings are:

=== Men ===
Rank	Athlete	Points
Gold medal	Mario Mola (ESP)	4819
Silver medal	Jonathan Brownlee (GBR)	4815
Bronze medal	Fernando Alarza (ESP)	4087
4	Henri Schoeman (RSA)	3160
5	Richard Murray (RSA)	2975
6	Ryan Bailie (AUS)	2893
7	Crisanto Grajales (MEX)	2822
8	Pierre Le Corre (FRA)	2810
9	Adam Bowden (GBR)	2700
10	Alistair Brownlee (GBR)	2679

=== Women ===
Rank	Athlete	Points
Gold medal	Flora Duffy (BER)	4691
Silver medal	Gwen Jorgensen (USA)	4435
Bronze medal	Ai Ueda (JPN)	3616
4	Katie Zaferes (USA)	3437
5	Helen Jenkins (GBR)	3410
6	Andrea Hewitt (NZL)	3223
7	Jodie Stimpson (GBR)	3145
8	Charlotte McShane (AUS)	3095
9	Sarah True (USA)	2855
10	Ashleigh Gentle (AUS)	2825
