= Bermuda at the 2026 Commonwealth Games =

- Flag of Bermuda
- CG code: BER
- CGA: Bermuda Olympic Association
- Website: olympics.bm

in Glasgow, Scotland 23 July 2026 – 2 August 2026
- Competitors: 13 in 3 sports
- Flag bearer: Tiara DeRosa
- Baton bearer: Caitlyn Bobb
- Medals Ranked =36th: Gold 0 Silver 0 Bronze 1 Total 1

Commonwealth Games appearances (overview)
- 1930; 1934; 1938; 1950; 1954; 1958–1962; 1966; 1970; 1974; 1978; 1982; 1986; 1990; 1994; 1998; 2002; 2006; 2010; 2014; 2018; 2022; 2026; 2030

Bermuda competed at the 2026 Commonwealth Games in Glasgow, Scotland. This marked Bermuda's 20th participation at the games, after making its debut at the inaugural games in 1930.

Donna Raynor was the territory's chef de mission for the games. The King's Baton relay stopped in Bermuda between April 26 and May 1, 2026.

The Bermuda team consisted of 13 athletes (seven men and six women) competing in three sports. For the first time, Bermuda was represented in both para-athletics and track cycling. The delegation's opening ceremony clothing was a tribute to the music group The Talbot Brothers.

Discus thrower Tiara DeRosa was the country's flagbearer during the opening ceremony. Meanwhile, sprinter Caitlyn Bobb was the baton bearer during the opening ceremony.

Bermuda won one medal, a bronze by Jessica Cooper Lewis in the Women's 400 m T54 event.

== Competitors ==
The following is the list of number of competitors participating at the Games per sport/discipline.

Sport		Men	Women	Total
Athletics	Athletics	3	3	6
Athletics	Para-athletics	0	1	1
Swimming		3	2	5
Track cycling		1	0	1
Total		7	6	13

== Medallist ==
The following Bermudan competitor won a medal at the games. In the by discipline sections below, medallists' names are bolded.

Medal	Name(s)	Sport	Event	Date	Ref.
Bronze	Jessica Cooper Lewis	Para athletics	Women's 400 m T54	1 August	

== Athletics ==
Bermuda entered seven track and field athletes, including one para athlete.

Track events

Athlete	Event	Heat		Semifinal		Final	
Athlete	Event	Result	Rank	Result	Rank	Result	Rank
Norre Robinson	Men's 200 m	DNF		Did not Advance			
Nirobi Smith-Mills	Men's 800 m	1:59.71	28	Did not Advance			
Caitlyn Bobb	Women's 400 m	54.94	16 **q**	55.17	20	Did not Advance	

Field events

Athlete	Event	Qualification		Final	
Athlete	Event	Distance	Rank	Distance	Rank
Jah-Nhai Perinchief	Men's triple jump	16.01	7 **q**	NM	
Sakari Famous	Women's high jump	—N/a		1.77	9
Tiara Derosa	Women's discus throw	—N/a		49.52	7

=== Para athletics ===
Athlete	Event	Round 1		Final	
Athlete	Event	Result	Rank	Result	Rank
**Jessica Cooper Lewis**	Women's 400 m T54	58.90	4 **Q**	59.31	3rd place, bronze medalist(s)

== Swimming ==
Bermuda entered five swimmers (three men and two women). Included in the team are two sets of siblings.

Athlete	Event	Heat		Semifinal		Final	
Athlete	Event	Time	Rank	Time	Rank	Time	Rank
Jack Harvey	Men's 50 m backstroke	25.50	13 **Q**	25.20	9	Did not advance	
Jack Harvey	Men's 100 m backstroke	54.75	9 **Q**	55.04	9	Did not advance	
Elijah Daley	Men's 100 m butterfly	55.36	19	Did not advance			
Elijah Daley	Men's 200 m individual medley	2:06.82	14	—N/a		Did not advance	
Sam Williamson	Men's 200 m individual medley	2:06.92	15	—N/a		Did not advance	
Elan Daley	Women's 100 m freestyle	56.66	20	Did not advance			
Elan Daley	Women's 50 m butterfly	27.56	16 **Q**	27.74	16	Did not advance	
Elan Daley	Women's 100 m butterfly	DQ		Did not advance			
Emma Harvey	Women's 50 m backstroke	29.20	14	29.13	14	Did not advance	
Emma Harvey	Women's 100 m backstroke	DNS					
Emma Harvey	Women's 50 m butterfly	27.16	13 **Q**	27.05	13	Did not advance	
Emma Harvey	Women's 100 m butterfly	1:00.65	11 **Q**	1:00.90	13	Did not advance	

== Track cycling ==
Bermuda entered one male track cyclist. This marked the country's debut in the discipline at the Commonwealth Games.

Points race

Athlete	Event	Qualification		Final	
Athlete	Event	Points	Rank	Points	Rank
Conor White	Men's point race	11	8 **Q**	-20	16

Pursuit

Athlete	Event	Qualification		Final	
Athlete	Event	Time	Rank	Opponent Results	Rank
Conor White	Men's individual pursuit	4:33.299	18	Did not advance	

Scratch race

Athlete	Event	Qualification	Final
Athlete	Event	Rank	Rank
Conor White	Men's scratch race	12	Did not advance

== See also ==
- 2025 Island Games
