= World Triathlon Mixed Relay Championships =

Triathlon competition

The World Triathlon Mixed Relay Championships, is an annual team triathlon competition organized by World Triathlon. The competition is completed in teams of four, two men and two women, with each member doing a super-sprint distance triathlon.

== History ==
The first relay event appeared in 2003 in Tiszaújváros, Hungary as the ITU Team Relay Championships, two races were run one for men's teams and one for women's teams every team would have three members who would each complete one leg and the teams combined time would be their total time. Despite being deemed a success the event would not return until 2006. The championship would return in 2006 and 2007 before once again lacking an annual competition in 2008. In 2009, World Triathlon (then known as the International Triathlon Union or ITU) went through a major reorganization of its top level competitions, the men's and women's relay championships where merged and the title would be contested as a mixed relay. The event was initiated with the aim of getting more triathletes as well as the team triathlon discipline on the Olympic programme.

The format appeared at the 2010 Summer Youth Olympics, the 2014 Commonwealth Games and the 2014 Asian Games, which was considered a significant step towards adding team triathlon to the 2016 Summer Olympic programme. In July 2013, the IOC executive board ruled that they would not add any new disciplines to the 2016 games for fear of putting additional financial pressure on Brazil. In June 2017 with the announcement of mixed gender events being added to the Olympic program the mixed team relay has gained Olympic status and will hold its inaugural Olympic event in the 2020 Olympics. In 2018 it was decided that at three of the events of that years World Triathlon Series would also host a mixed relay event would be held alongside the men's and women's competition one of these would be the World Championship and all three events would grant points towards Olympic qualification and constitute the new mixed relay series. In 2019 the number of mixed relays in World Triathlon Series were increased to five and once again one of these would be the World Championship.

In 2021 the Mixed Relay World Championships were awarded to Bermuda, with the intent of holding a combined World Triathlon Sprint & Mixed Relay Championships, which would also mark the return of a stand alone Sprint Championship after a ten-year hiatus. However, the Bermuda event was cancelled due to Covid-19 restrictions, and the inaugural combined event was instead held as the Montréal leg of the 2022 World Triathlon Championship Series. The event doubled as the first qualifier for the 2024 Summer Olympics, and also included the first age-group mixed relay world championships.

== Results ==
=== 4 x 4 Mixed relay ===
Year	Gold	Silver	Bronze
2009	Switzerland Magali Messmer; Lukas Salvisberg; Daniela Ryf; Ruedi Wild	Australia Emma Moffatt; Courtney Atkinson; Emma Snowsill; Brad Kahlefeldt	Canada Lauren Campbell; Brent McMahon; Kathy Tremblay; Simon Whitfield
2010	Switzerland Nicola Spirig; Sven Riederer; Daniela Ryf; Ruedi Wild	France Jessica Harrison; Frédéric Belaubre; Carole Péon; David Hauss	New Zealand Kate Mcllroy; Tony Dodds; Nicky Samuels; Ryan Sissons
2011	Great Britain Jodie Stimpson; Jonathan Brownlee; Helen Jenkins; Alistair Brownlee	Switzerland Melanie Hauss; Ruedi Wild; Nicola Spirig; Sven Riederer	Germany Anja Dittmer; Maik Petzold; Svenja Balzen; Steffen Justus
2012	Great Britain Vicky Holland; William Clake; Non Stanford; Jonathan Brownlee	France Jessica Harrison; Tony Moulai; Carole Péon; Vincent Luis	Russia Irina Abysova; Dmitry Polyanskiy; Alexandra Razarenova; Alexander Bryukhankov
2013	Germany Anja Knapp; Jan Frodeno; Anne Haug; Franz Loeschke	New Zealand Andrea Hewitt; Tony Dodds; Kate McIlroy; Ryan Sissons	United States Sarah Groff; Ben Kanute; Gwen Jorgensen; Cameron Dye
2014	Great Britain Lucy Hall; Jonathan Brownlee; Vicky Holland; Alistair Brownlee	France Cassandre Beaugrand; Dorian Coninx; Audrey Merle; Vincent Luis	Hungary Zsófia Kovács; Tamás Tóth; Margit Vanek; Ákos Vanek
2015	France Jeanne Lehair; Dorian Coninx; Audrey Merle; Vincent Luis	Australia Gillian Backhouse; Aaron Royle; Emma Jackson; Ryan Baillie	Great Britain Vicky Holland; Gordon Benson; Non Stanford; Mark Buckingham
2016	United States Gwen Jorgensen; Ben Kanute; Kirsten Kasper; Joe Maloy	Australia Charlotte McShane; Jacob Birtwhistle; Emma Jackson; Ryan Bailie	Germany Laura Lindemann; Jonathan Zipf; Hanna Philippin; Gregor Buchholz
2017	Australia Charlotte McShane; Matthew Hausser; Ashleigh Gentle; Jacob Birtwhistle	United States Kirsten Kasper; Ben Kanute; Katie Zaferes; Matthew Mcelroy	Netherlands Maaike Caelers; Marco Van Der Stel; Rachel Klamer; Jorik Van Egdom
2018	France Léonie Périault; Dorian Coninx; Cassandre Beaugrand; Vincent Luis	Australia Natalie Van Coevorden; Aaron Royle; Ashleigh Gentle; Jacob Birtwhistle	United States Kirsten Kasper; Ben Kanute; Katie Zaferes; Kevin McDowell
2019	France Émilie Morier; Léo Bergère; Cassandre Beaugrand; Vincent Luis	Germany Laura Lindemann; Valentin Wernz; Nina Eim; Justus Nieschlag	Australia Natalie Van Coevorden; Aaron Royle; Emma Jeffcoat; Jacob Birtwhistle
2020	France Léonie Périault; Léo Bergère; Cassandre Beaugrand; Dorian Coninx	United States Taylor Spivey; Kevin McDowell; Katie Zaferes; Morgan Pearson	Great Britain Georgia Taylor-Brown; Barclay Izzard; Jessica Learmonth; Alex Yee
2021	not held		
2022	France Pierre Le Corre; Emma Lombardi; Vincent Luis; Cassandre Beaugrand	Great Britain Alex Yee; Sophie Coldwell; Sam Dickinson; Georgia Taylor-Brown	United States Seth Rider; Taylor Spivey; Kevin McDowell; Summer Rappaport
2023	Germany Tim Hellwig; Annika Koch; Simon Henseleit; Laura Lindemann	New Zealand Hayden Wilde; Ainsley Thorpe; Tayler Reid; Nicole van der Kaay	Switzerland Max Studer; Julie Derron; Sylvain Fridelance; Cathia Schär
2024	Germany Henry Graf; Lisa Tertsch; Lasse Lührs; Annika Koch	Switzerland Max Studer; Julie Derron; Simon Westermann; Cathia Schär	New Zealand Tayler Reid; Ainsley Thorpe; Dylan McCullough; Nicole van der Kaay
2025	Australia Sophie Linn; Luke Willian; Emma Jeffcoat; Matthew Hauser	France Léonie Périault; Yanis Seguin; Cassandre Beaugrand; Dorian Coninx	Germany Lisa Tertsch; Lasse Nygaard Priester; Tanja Neubert; Henry Graf
2026	France Léonie Périault; Tom Richard; Emma Lombardi; Dorian Coninx	Hungary Márta Kropkó; Márk Dévay; Fanni Szalai; Csongor Lehmann	Great Britain Beth Potter; Max Stapley; Jessica Fullagar; Oliver Conway

== Team Relay Championships ==
Before the creation of the mixed team relay, single gendered relay races were held intermittently.

=== Men's championship ===
Year	Gold	Silver	Bronze
2003	Australia; Simon Thompson; Richie Cunningham; Brad Kahlefeldt	Spain; Clemente Alonso McKernan; José María Merchán; Iván Raña	Ukraine; Vladimir Turbayevskiy; Andriy Glushchenko; Maxim Kriat
2006	United States; Brian Fleischmann; Andy Potts; Matt Reed	Germany; Jan Frodeno; Maik Petzold; Daniel Unger	Canada; Kyle Jones; Colin Jenkins; Paul Tichelaar
2007	Russia	Germany	Spain

=== Women's championship ===
Year	Gold	Silver	Bronze
2003	Australia; Nikki Butterfield; Mirinda Carfrae; Pip Taylor	Spain; Ainhoa Murúa; Pilar Hidalgo; Ana Burgos	Italy; Beatrice Lanza; Silvia Gemignani; Nadia Cortassa
2006	Italy; Daniela Chmet; Beatrice Lanza; Nadia Cortassa	United States; Sarah True; Mary Beth Ellis; Michelle Lindsay	Spain; Ana Burgos; Zuriñe Rodríguez; Ainhoa Murúa
2007	Russia; Irina Abysova; Evgeniya Matveeva; Anastasiya Polyanskaya	Ukraine; Inna Tutukina; Yuliya Yelistratova; Olesya Prystayko	Italy; Daniela Chmet; Charlotte Bonin; Nadia Cortassa
