= Triathlon at the 2026 Central American and Caribbean Games =

- Venue: Sans Souci
- Location: Santo Domingo Este, Dominican Republic
- Dates: 1–3 August

The triathlon competition at the 2026 Central American and Caribbean Games was held at Sans Souci, in Santo Domingo Este, Dominican Republic, from 1 to 3 August 2026.

== Participating nations ==
A total of 15 nations qualified athletes. The number of athletes a nation entered is in parentheses beside the name of the country.

- Aruba (2)
- Barbados (2)
- Bermuda (2)
- Colombia (4)
- Costa Rica (5)
- Cuba (5)
- Dominican Republic (5)
- El Salvador (1)
- Guatemala (6)
- Haiti (2)
- Honduras (2)
- Mexico (6)
- Panama (1)
- Puerto Rico (5)
- Venezuela (6)

== Medal table ==
* Host nation (Dominican Republic)

Rank	Nation	Gold	Silver	Bronze	Total
1	Mexico (MEX)	5	0	1	6
2	Barbados (BAR)	0	2	0	2
3	Colombia (COL)	0	1	1	2
4	Cuba (CUB)	0	1	0	1
4	Honduras (HON)	0	1	0	1
6	Venezuela (VEN)	0	0	2	2
7	Bermuda (BER)	0	0	1	1
Totals (7 entries)		5	5	5	15

== Medal summary ==
Event	Gold	Silver	Bronze
Men's individual	Aram Peñaflor; Mexico	Matthew Wright; Barbados	Tyler Smith; Bermuda
Men's team	Mexico; Aram Peñaflor; Nicolás Probert; Erik Ramos	Barbados; Matthew Wright; Fynn Armstrong	Venezuela; Yhousman Perdomo; Cristian Torrealba
Women's individual	Ana María Torres; Mexico	Carolina Velásquez; Colombia	Rosa Tapia; Mexico
Women's team	Mexico; Ana Maria Torres; Rosa Tapia; Marcela Álvarez	Honduras; Julia Alcalá; Camila Alcalá	Venezuela; Rosa Martínez; Génesis Ruiz; Yaniuska Jiménez
Mixed relay	Mexico; Rosa Tapia; Nicolás Probert; Marcela Álvarez; Erik Ramos	Cuba; Leslie Amat; Alejandro Rodríguez; Isabel Rodríguez; Marcos Fernández	Colombia; Carolina Velásquez; Carlos Quinchara; Valentina Álvarez; Brian Moya
