= Nina Eim =

German triathlete (born 1998)

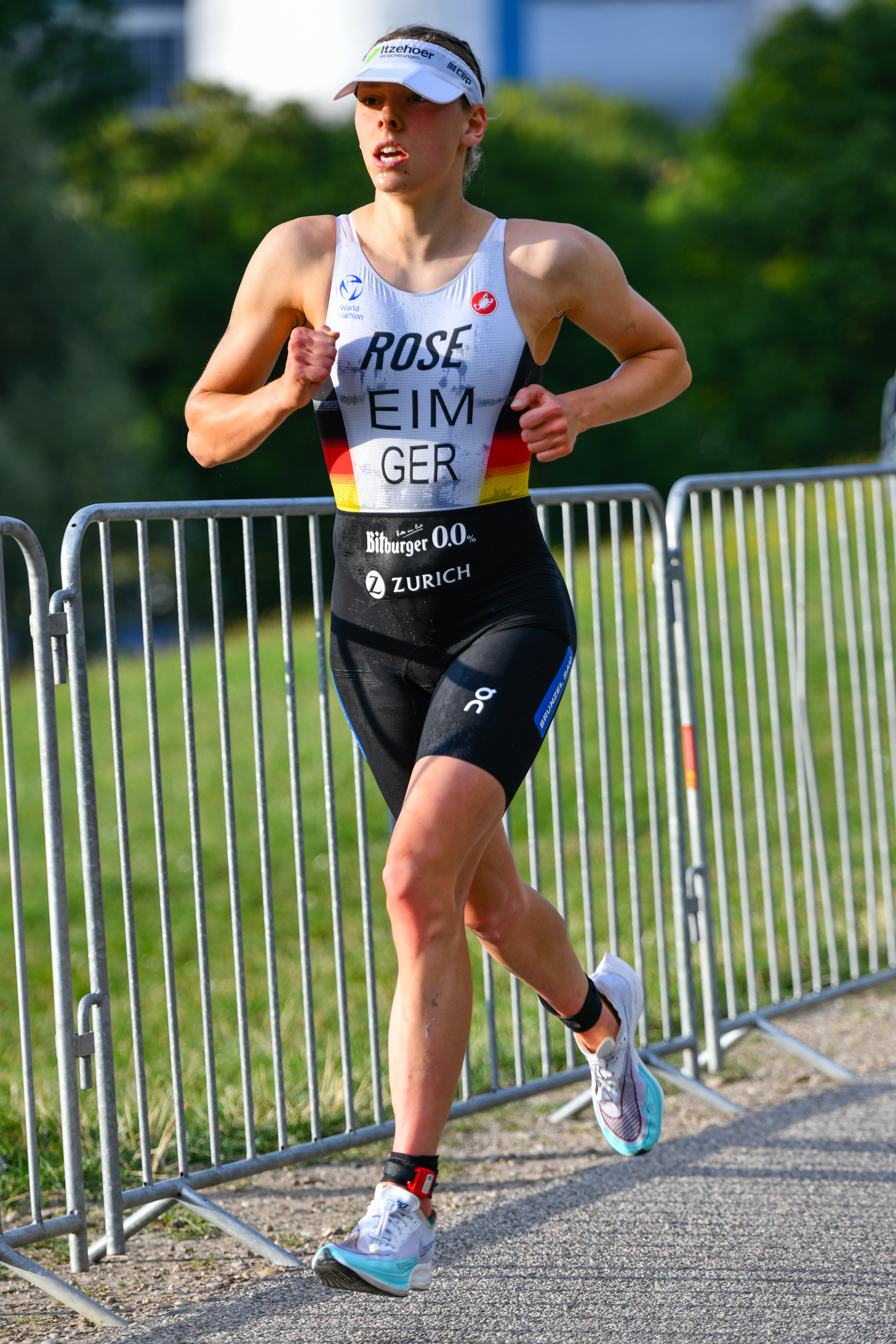

Personal information
- Nationality: German
- Born: 1 August 1998 (age 27)

Sport
- Sport: Athletics, Triathlon
- Event: Cross country running
Medal record
Representing Germany
World Triathlon Mixed Relay Championships
Silver medal – second place	2019 Hamburg	Mixed relay
Europe Triathlon Championships
Silver medal – second place	2022 Munich	Mixed Relay
Silver medal – second place	2019 Weert	Mixed Relay

Nina Eim (born 1 August 1998) is a German triathlete. She was a silver medalist in the mixed team relay at the 2022 European Triathlon Championships. She competed at the 2024 Olympic Games.

== Biography ==
In 2015, at the age of 17 years-old, she won a junior European Cup race in Tulcea, Romania. In 2017, in Kitzbühel she ran as part the German junior mixed-relay squad that finish third at the junior European Championship. She gained her first win at the elite level at the ATU sprint African Cup in Yasmine Hammamet in 2018. That year, she finished in third place in the European Cup sprint race in Olsztyn, Poland and finished third in Weert, Netherlands over the Olympic distance.

Eim won a first global medal (bronze) at the World University Triathlon Championships in Kalmar, Sweden in September 2018. In February 2019, she retained her ATU sprint African Cup title in Zimbabwe.

She was part of the German team that won silver medals at the 2019 European Triathlon Championships in Weert in June 2019, and at the 2019 Triathlon Mixed Relay World Championships in July 2019 in Hamburg.

In 2022, she won the Europe Triathlon Sprint Championships in Olsztyn. Later that year, she finished fourth in the Individual event and won silver in the mixed relay at the 2022 European Triathlon Championships in Munich.

In October 2023, she won the inaugural Rome World Cup. She gained qualification for the 2024 Summer Olympics in Paris by finishing sixth in the test event on the course. At the Games themselves, she finished in twelfth place in the individual event, held on 31 July 2024.

In February 2025, she finished runner-up to compatriot Lisa Tertsch at World Triathlon’s first sprint distance series race in Abu Dhabi.

In March 2026, Eim won the World Triathlon Cup Lanzarote ahead of Britain's Georgia Taylor-Brown and Eim's compatriot Laura Lindemann.

== Personal life ==
She is from Itzehoe in Schleswig-Holstein.
