= Ben Kanute =

American triathlete (born 1992)

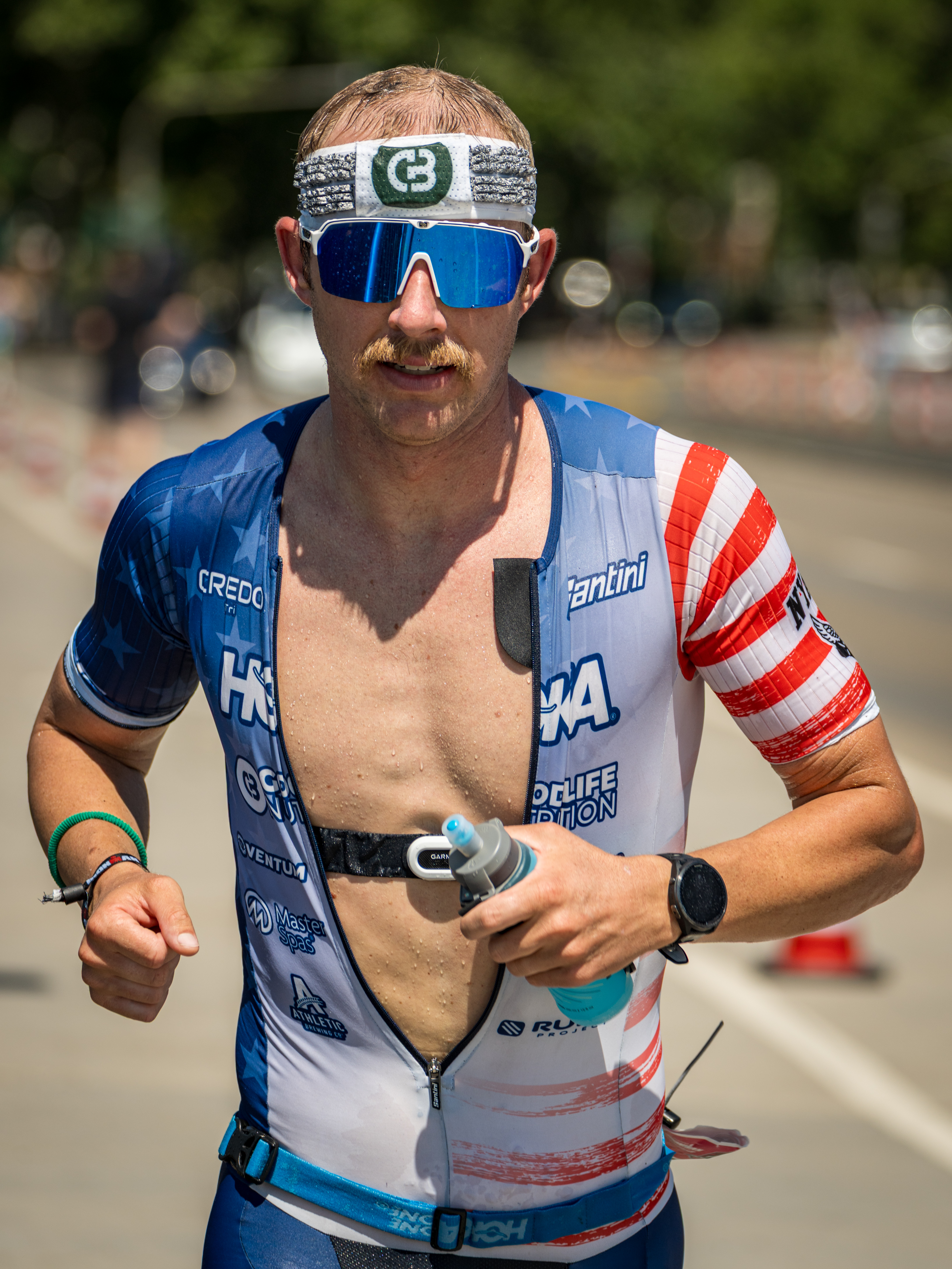
- Ben Kanute at the 2025 Ironman European Championship.

Personal information
- Born: December 14, 1992 (age 33) Geneva, Illinois, U.S.
- Height: 183 cm (6 ft 0 in)
- Weight: 70 kg (154 lb)

Sport
- Sport: Triathlon
Medal record
Ironman 70.3 World Championship
Silver medal – second place	2022	Individual
Silver medal – second place	2017	Individual

Ben Kanute (born December 14, 1992) is an American triathlete who competed at the 2016 Summer Olympics. In 2017 and 2022 he took second place at the Ironman 70.3 World Championship.

== Career ==
Kanute is the 2015 USA Triathlon Elite National champion. He teamed with Gwen Jorgensen, Kirsten Casper, and Joe Maloy to win the 2016 ITU Triathlon Mixed Relay World Championships for the United States. Kanute qualified for the 2016 Summer Olympics through his placement in a May 2016 qualifying race. He finished 29th at the Olympics in a combined time of 1:48:59.

== Personal life ==
Kanute studied at Marmion Academy, and later graduated with a degree in physiology from the University of Arizona after just three years of study. He took up triathlons at the age of eight inspired by his father. He has two younger brothers. He is married with two children.
