= Matthew Wright (triathlete) =

Barbadian triathlete (born 1992)

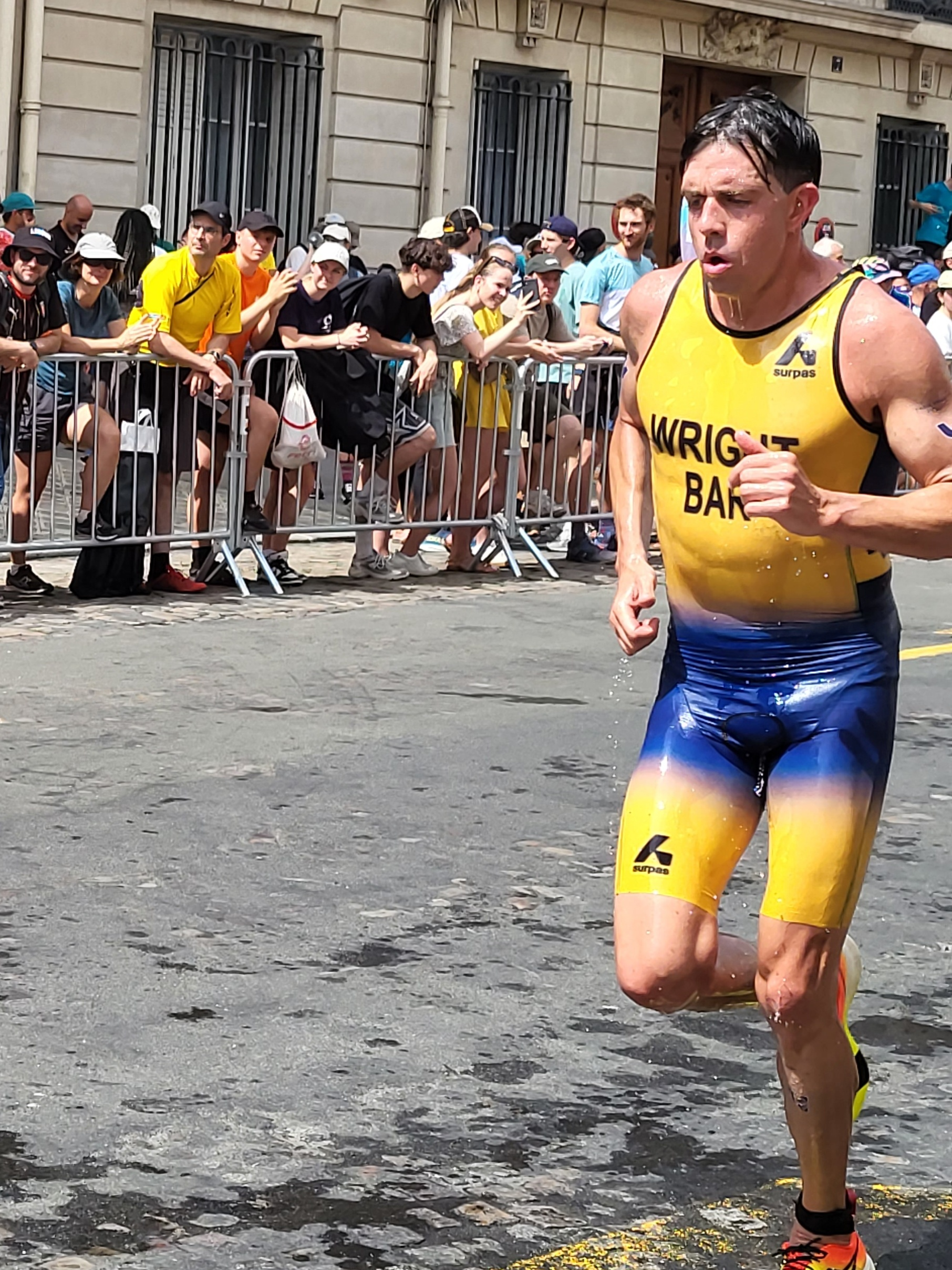

Personal information
- Born: 13 May 1992 (age 34) Barbados
- Education: Loughborough University

Sport
- Country: Barbados
- Sport: Triathlon
Medal record
Representing Barbados
Men's triathlon
Central American and Caribbean Games
Silver medal – second place	2026 Santo Domingo	Individual
Silver medal – second place	2026 Santo Domingo	Team

Matthew Wright (born 13 May 1992) is a Barbadian triathlete. He qualified to represent Barbados at the 2024 Summer Olympics.

== Biography ==
Wright was born in 1992 in Barbados, and grew up there. When young, he competed in multiple sports, including swimming, surfing, cricket and football. While in primary school, he tried out triathlon for the first time at a youth tournament organized by the Triathlon Association of Barbados. He then competed at triathlon events monthly and began focusing on the sport fully from age 16.

Wright made his international debut at the 2009 Oklahoma PATCO Triathlon Pan American Championships in the junior division, placing 43rd. After continuing to compete in junior international competitions through 2011, Wright began attending Loughborough University in England. After he graduated from there, he joined a triathlon club in Canada.

Wright and Jason Wilson represented Barbados at the 2014 Commonwealth Games in triathlon, with Wright placing 20th. He also competed at the 2014 ITU World Triathlon Series Grand Final and later competed at the 2015 ITU World Triathlon Series; he participated in a total of 19 international competitions from 2014 to 2016, with his best placement being at the 2015 Bridgetown CAMTRI Sprint Triathlon American Cup, where he was fourth. After opening the 2017 season with three top 10 finishes at ITU Continental events, he was injured at the Bridgetown CAMTRI Sprint Triathlon American Cup and Caribbean and Central American Championship (where he placed eighth), which resulted in him missing several competitions, although he was able to win the Canadian Esprit de Montreal tournament towards the end of the year.

Wright contacted a friend from Loughborough in 2018, which resulted in him joining the club National Triathlon Performance Centre Wales in 2019. In 2018, Wright competed for Barbados at the Commonwealth Games, placing 25th, competed at the 2018 Central American and Caribbean Games, and he later placed 10th at the 2019 Pan American Games. He also won the Barbadian national championship in 2019. He attempted to qualify for the 2020 Summer Olympics, but was unsuccessful due to injuries.

Wright competed at the 2022 Commonwealth Games, where he was the co-flagbearer, and placed 17th. Later that year, he won his first international competition at the age of 30, winning gold at the Asia Triathlon Cup in Aqaba, Jordan. His win moved him up from a World Triathlon ranking of 308 to a ranking of 193. He opened the 2023 season with three medals in three events, including gold at the Africa Triathlon Cup in Egypt. He later won a bronze medal at the 2023 Central American and Caribbean Games in July and gold at the Americas Triathlon Sprint Championships in September, increasing his global ranking to 60th. He also participated at the 2023 Pan American Games, coming in 10th.

Wright placed 41st at the World Triathlon Championship Series in 2024, which qualified him for the 2024 Summer Olympics in Paris.

=== 2026 ===
Wright won two silver medals at the 2026 Central American and Caribbean Games, individual and men's team with Fynn Armstrong.
