= Swimming at the 2026 Commonwealth Games – Women's 100 metre butterfly =

Women's 100 metre butterfly at the 2026 Commonwealth Games
- Venue: Tollcross International Swimming Centre
- Dates: 26 July (heats, semifinals); 27 July (final)
- Winning time: 56.38

Medalists
gold medal	Alexandria Perkins	Australia
silver medal	Keanna Macinnes	Scotland
bronze medal	Erin Gallagher	South Africa

The women's 100 metre butterfly event at the 2026 Commonwealth Games was held on 26 and 27 July at the Tollcross International Swimming Centre.

== Schedule ==
The schedule is as follows:

All times are British Summer Time (UTC+1)

Date	Time	Round
Sunday 26 July 2026	10:30	Heats
Sunday 26 July 2026	19:00	Semifinals
Monday 27 July 2026	19:00	Final

== Results ==
=== Heats ===
The heats were held on the morning of 26 July 2026.

Heat results
Rank	Heat	Lane	Swimmer	Nation	Time	Notes
1	4	5	Brittany Castelluzzo	Australia	57.91	Q
2	2	4	Keanna Macinnes	Scotland	57.93	Q
3	2	5	Ciara Schlosshan	Scotland	58.13	Q
4	4	3	Lucy Grieve	Scotland	58.29	Q
4	4	4	Alexandria Perkins	Australia	58.29	Q
6	3	4	Erin Gallagher	South Africa	58.77	Q
7	2	3	Emily Richards	England	59.13	Q
8	3	3	Lizzy Dekkers	Australia	59.31	Q
9	3	5	Hazel Ouwehand	New Zealand	1:00.33	Q
10	2	6	Alana Burns-Atkin	Northern Ireland	1:00.56	Q
11	3	6	Emma Harvey	Bermuda	1:00.65	Q
12	4	6	Lucy Fox	England	1:00.66	Q
13	3	2	Dune Coetzee	South Africa	1:01.02	Q
14	4	2	Jessica Calderbank	Jamaica	1:01.34	Q
15	2	2	I.-B.P. Thorpe	Kenya	1:02.35	Q
16	4	7	Sierrah Broadbelt	Cayman Islands	1:02.59	Q
17	3	7	Sabrina Lyn	Jamaica	1:03.19	R
18	2	1	Orla Rabey	Guernsey	1:03.76	R
19	3	1	Oriana Wheeler	Guernsey	1:03.94	
20	2	8	Jaiya Simmons	Barbados	1:04.43	
21	2	7	Mia Laban	Cook Islands	1:04.50	
22	3	8	Paige Schendelaar-Kemp	Samoa	1:04.94	
23	4	1	Elyse Wood	Bahamas	1:05.01	
24	1	6	Noelie Lacour	Gabon	1:05.23	
25	4	8	Davia Richardson	Belize	1:04.94	
26	1	3	Hayley Michelle Hoy	Eswatini	1:08.37	
27	1	5	Aleka Persaud	Guyana	1:08.39	
28	1	4	Emma Bourgaize	Guernsey	1:08.52	
29	1	2	Dorianne Bristol	Seychelles	1:15.15	
	1	7	Elan Daley	Bermuda		DSQ

=== Semifinals ===
The semifinals took place during of the evening of 26 July 2026.

Semifinal results
Rank	Heat	Lane	Swimmer	Nation	Time	Notes
1	1	5	Alexandria Perkins	Australia	57.16	Q
2	2	4	Brittany Castelluzzo	Australia	57.64	Q
3	1	4	Keanna Macinnes	Scotland	57.68	Q
4	2	5	Ciara Schlosshan	Scotland	57.70	Q
5	1	3	Erin Gallagher	South Africa	57.94	Q
6	2	3	Lucy Grieve	Scotland	58.17	Q
7	2	2	Hazel Ouwehand	New Zealand	58.56	Q
8	1	6	Lizzy Dekkers	Australia	58.58	Q
9	2	6	Emily Richards	England	58.85	R
10	1	7	Lucy Fox	England	1:00.27	R
11	1	2	Alana Burns-Atkin	Northern Ireland	1:00.66	
12	2	1	Dune Coetzee	South Africa	1:00.70	
13	2	7	Emma Harvey	Bermuda	1:00.90	
14	1	1	Jessica Calderbank	Jamaica	1:01.31	
15	2	8	I.-B.P. Thorpe	Kenya	1:02.20	
16	1	8	Sierrah Broadbelt	Cayman Islands	1:02.42	

=== Final ===
The final took place during of the evening of 27 July 2026.

Final results
Rank	Lane	Swimmer	Nation	Time	Notes
1st place, gold medalist(s)	4	Alexandria Perkins	Australia	56.38	
2nd place, silver medalist(s)	3	Keanna Macinnes	Scotland	57.33	
3rd place, bronze medalist(s)	2	Erin Gallagher	South Africa	57.39	
4	5	Brittany Castelluzzo	Australia	57.40	
5	6	Ciara Schlosshan	Scotland	57.58	
6	7	Lucy Grieve	Scotland	57.90	
7	8	Lizzy Dekkers	Australia	59.28	
8	1	Hazel Ouwehand	New Zealand	59.63	
