= Bermuda at the Commonwealth Games =

- CGF code: BER
- CGA: Bermuda Olympic Association
- Website: olympics.bm
- Medals Ranked 36th: Gold 3 Silver 2 Bronze 3 Total 8

Commonwealth Games appearances (overview)
- 1930; 1934; 1938; 1950; 1954; 1958–1962; 1966; 1970; 1974; 1978; 1982; 1986; 1990; 1994; 1998; 2002; 2006; 2010; 2014; 2018; 2022; 2026; 2030

Bermuda competed in the first 1930 Games and has competed in a total of seventeen of the twenty Commonwealth Games to date. Bermuda took part in the 1986 Games opening ceremony and in the opening day of competition before the Bermuda Olympic Association decided to formally withdraw.

== Overall medal tally ==
With eight medals, Bermuda is thirty-sixth in the All-time tally of medals after the 2022 Games.

	(gold)	(silver)	(bronze)	Total
Bermuda	3	2	3	8

Edition	Gold	Silver	Bronze	Total
2022 Birmingham	1	0	1	2
1990 Auckland	1	0	0	1
2018 Gold Coast	1	0	0	1
1966 Kingston	0	1	0	1
1998 Kuala Lumpur	0	1	0	1
1982 Brisbane	0	0	1	1
1994 Victoria	0	0	1	1
1930 Hamilton	0	0	0	0
1934 London	0	0	0	0
1938 Sydney	0	0	0	0
1954 Vancouver	0	0	0	0
1970 Edinburgh	0	0	0	0
1974 Christchurch	0	0	0	0
1978 Edmonton	0	0	0	0
1986 Edinburgh	0	0	0	0
2002 Manchester	0	0	0	0
2006 Melbourne	0	0	0	0
2010 Delhi	0	0	0	0
2014 Glasgow	0	0	0	0
Totals (19 entries)	3	2	3	8

== See also ==
- All-time medal tally of Commonwealth Games
