= Natalie Van Coevorden =

Australian triathlete

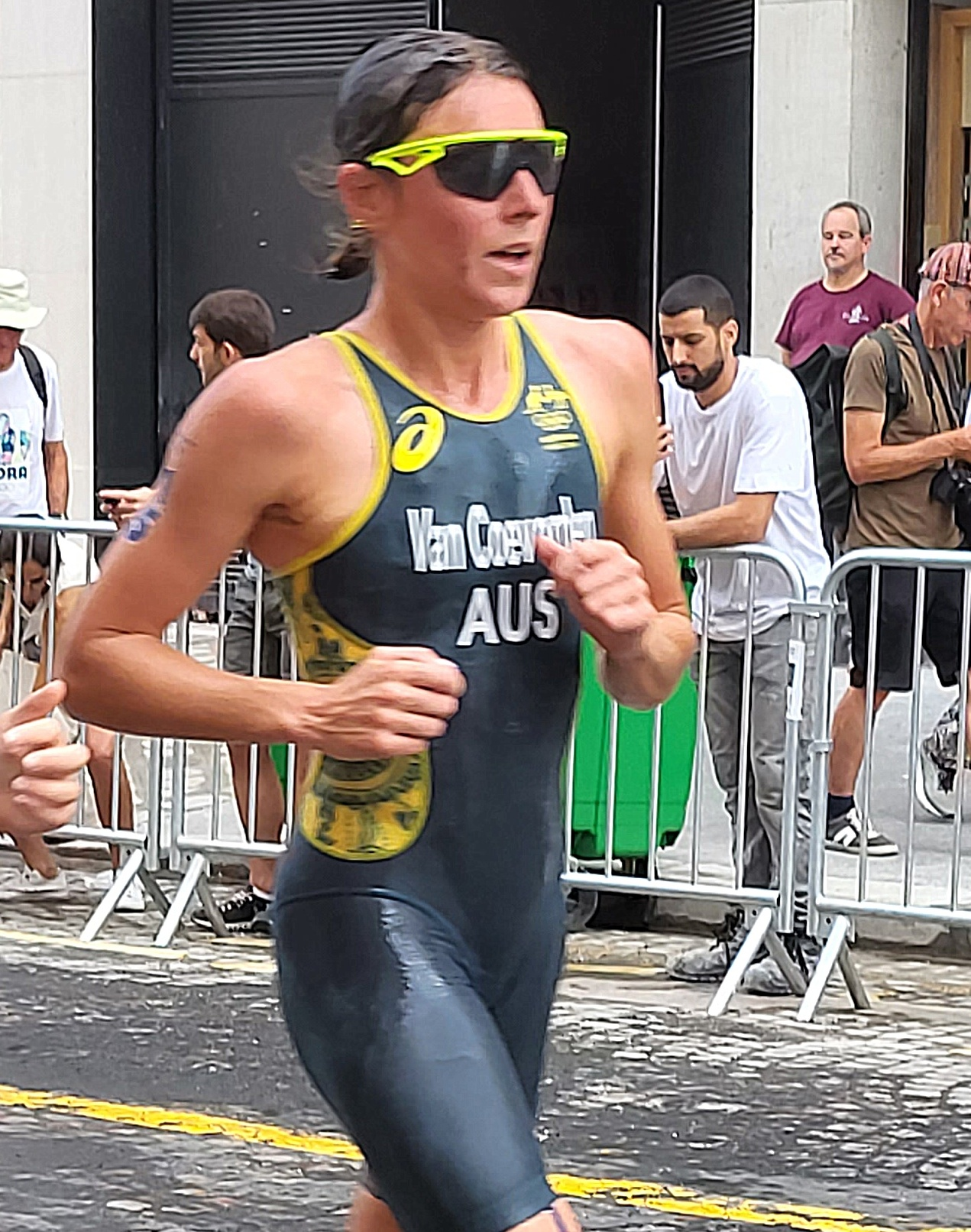

Personal information
- Nationality: Australian
- Born: 22 December 1992 (age 33) Campbelltown, New South Wales, Australia
- Education: John Therry Catholic High School
- Years active: 2009–present

Sport
- Sport: Triathlon
- Rank: 24th (World Triathlon Series); 1st (WTS Oceania)
- Coached by: Ryan Williams

Achievements and titles
- Highest world ranking: 11th (WTS 2018)
Medal record
Representing Australia
Commonwealth Games
Bronze medal – third place	2022 Birmingham	Mixed relay

Natalie Van Coevorden (born 22 December 1992 in Campbelltown, New South Wales) is an Australian triathlete. Currently she is ranked 24th in the World Triathlon Series, and is number 1 in Oceania.

== Early life and career ==
Van Coevorden was born and grew up in Campbelltown, New South Wales, doing both swimming and cross country running throughout her years at John Therry Catholic High School. During her youth, she swam nine times a week. In 2009 she began triathlon and placed 4th at the Australian National Schools Triathlon in 2010. It was here that she was scouted by her coach Jamie Turner and began training full-time for triathlon, splitting her time between her training base in Wollongong, Australia and Vitoria, Spain. Prior to meeting Turner, she had completed only one triathlon, for which she had no structured training.

In 2012, Van Coevorden competed in her first World Triathlon Series race in Sydney, and has completed many races on the ITU circuit since. In 2013, she gained her first podium on the ITU circuit at the Tongyeong World Cup where she placed 3rd. In 2018, she gained her first WTS medal in Abu Dhabi, placing 3rd. That same year, she stated that "[competing in the] Olympics is now a realistic goal for me – my ultimate goal...my dream". 2019 saw her earn a bronze medal for Australia at the ITU Triathlon Mixed Relay World Championship in Hamburg; alongside Aaron Royle and Emma Jeffcoat.

She competed in the women's triathlon at the 2024 Summer Olympics in Paris, France.
