= Gwen Jorgensen =

American triathlete (born 1986)

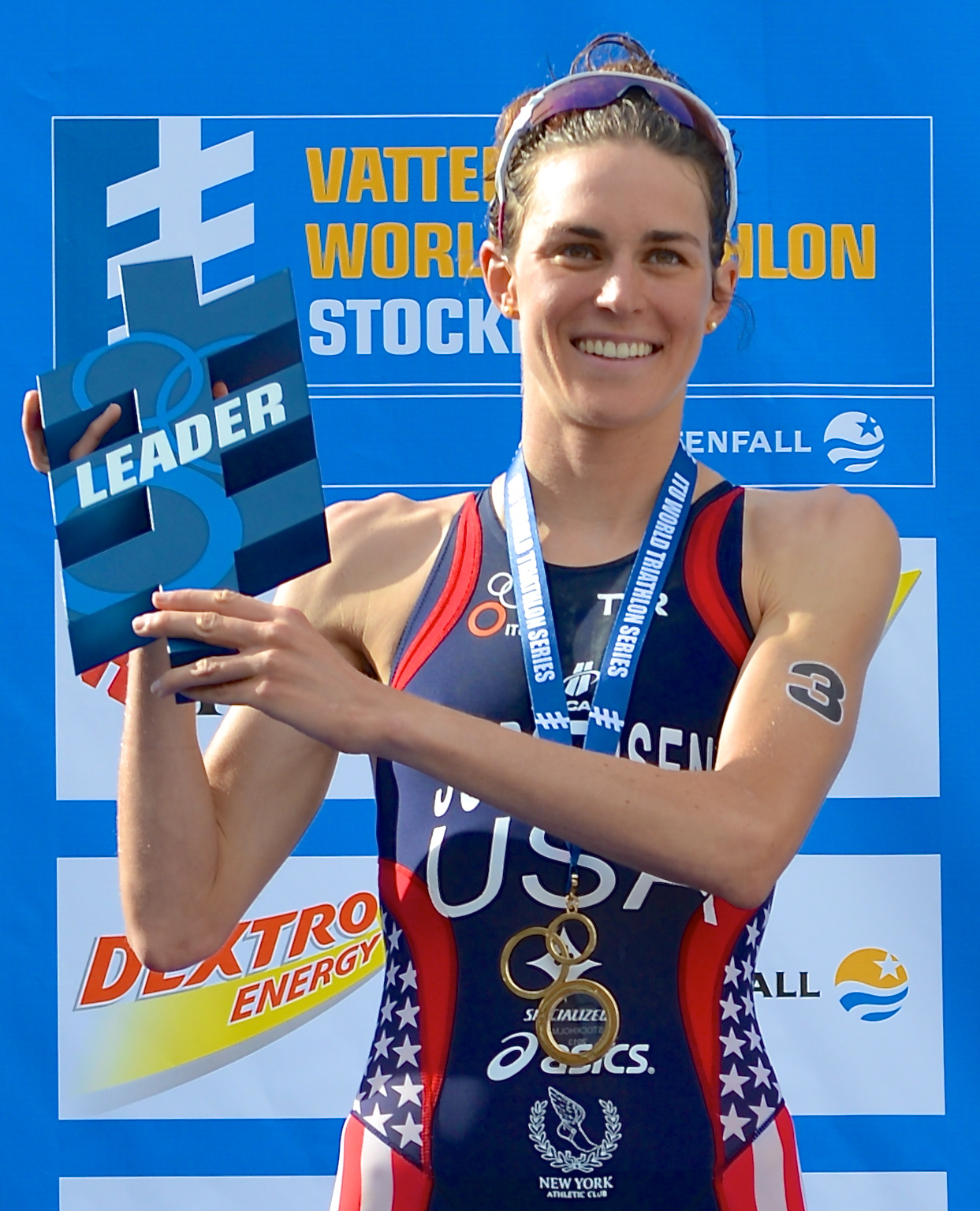
- Jorgensen following her win at the 2013 ITU World Triathlon Series race in Stockholm.

Personal information
- Full name: Gwen Rosemary Jorgensen
- Nationality: American
- Born: April 25, 1986 (age 40) Waukesha, Wisconsin
- Height: 5 ft 9 in (175 cm)
- Weight: 130 lb (59 kg)

Sport
- Sport: Triathlon (2010 - 2017); Marathon (2017 - 2021)
- Turned pro: 2010
- Coached by: Bobby McGee

Achievements and titles
- Personal bests: Track and Field mile: 4:39.43 i 3000 m: 8:48.50; 5000 m: 15:08.28; 10000 m: 31:55.68; Half marathon: 1:10:58 Marathon: 2:36:13
Medal record
Women's Triathlon
Representing United States
Olympic Games
Gold medal – first place	2016 Rio de Janeiro	Individual
ITU Triathlon World Championships
Gold medal – first place	2015	Elite
Gold medal – first place	2014	Elite
Silver medal – second place	2016	Elite

Gwen Rosemary Jorgensen (born April 25, 1986, in Waukesha, Wisconsin) is an American distance runner and professional triathlete. She was the champion of the 2014 and 2015 ITU World Triathlon Series. She was named USA Triathlon's 2013 and 2014 Olympic/ITU Female Athlete of the Year. She was a member of the 2012 Olympic Team and again represented the United States in triathlon at the 2016 Summer Olympics, where she won the USA's first ever triathlon gold medal with a time of 1 hour, 56 minutes, and 16 seconds.

== Career ==
Jorgensen attended the University of Wisconsin-Madison, where she swam and ran for the Badgers. She earned a master's degree in accounting, passed the CPA exam, and worked for Ernst & Young in Milwaukee as a tax accountant. Soon after she had graduated and begun her new job, USA Triathlon, which was pursuing former college swimmers and runners, encouraged Jorgensen to try the sport of triathlon. In 2010, she was selected as USA Triathlon's Rookie of the Year following her silver medal at the World University Triathlon Championships in Spain.

At the 2011 World Championship Series in London, Jorgensen placed 2nd, which earned her a spot on the 2012 US Olympic triathlon team. In the London Olympics, she suffered a flat tire on the bike portion of the race and finished in 38th place.

In 2014, Jorgensen placed first in four consecutive World Triathlon Series races, something no other female had done in the history of the series. Her winning streak extended through 2015, with a total of 13 consecutive series wins by the end of the year. Her astonishing streak was finally ended in 2016 by Helen Jenkins in Gold Coast, Australia. By coincidence, Jenkins had been the last competitor to have beaten her before her streak, in Cape Town in 2014. In 2015, she joined ECS Triathlon, an elite club, based in Sartrouville, France.

At the 2016 Summer Olympics in Rio, Jorgensen won gold in triathlon. She then entered the New York City Marathon and placed 14th with a time of 2:41:01.

Jorgensen announced via Twitter on January 19, 2017, that she and her husband were expecting a child. She gave birth to a boy, Stanley, on August 16, 2017 - almost two weeks after his due date.

In November 2017, Jorgensen announced that she was retiring from triathlon and focusing on the marathon, with the goal of winning an Olympic gold in the discipline at Tokyo 2020. However, after suffering injuries and undergoing heel surgery during her marathon build-up, Jorgensen announced on December 4, 2019, that she would focus on qualifying in track, in either the 5,000m or the 10,000m. However, she failed to qualify; she finished 9th in the 5,000m and was unable to complete the 10,000m.

In October 2019, Jorgensen's mother and sister published Go, Gwen, Go: A Family's Journey to Olympic Gold. In the book, they document Jorgensen's rise from a Milwaukee CPA to 2016 Olympic Champion and describe the family's experience raising an Olympian.

Jorgensen returned to the ITU World Triathlon Series in 2023. She attempted to qualify for the US team for the 2024 Olympics triathlon. After finishing well back in two 2024 World Triathlon Championship Series races (15th in Yokohama and 33rd in Hamburg), she was not selected to the team, though she was invited to be an alternate.

== ITU competitions ==
Jorgensen's ITU race results are:

Results list

Date	Competition	Place	Rank
2010-05-28	World University Triathlon Championships	Valencia	2
2010-06-26	Pan American Cup	Coteau-du-Lac	5
2010-07-10	Pan American Cup	San Francisco	3
2010-08-20	Premium Pan American Cup	Kelowna	5
2010-09-03	Duathlon World Championships	Edinburgh	13
2010-09-25	Premium Pan American Cup	Tuscaloosa	8
2010-10-10	World Cup	Huatulco	5
2010-10-17	Pan American Championships	Puerto Vallarta	2
2011-03-05	Sprint Pan American Cup	Clermont	3
2011-03-26	World Cup	Mooloolaba	16
2011-04-09	Pan American Cup	Mazatlan	5
2011-05-08	World Cup	Monterrey	5
2011-06-04	World Championship Series	Madrid	DNF
2011-07-16	World Championship Series	Hamburg	27
2011-08-06	World Championship Series	London	2
2011-08-14	World Cup	Tiszaújváros	1
2011-08-20	Sprint World Championships	Lausanne	6
2011-09-24	Pan American Cup	Buffalo	3
2011-10-09	Pan American Cup	Myrtle Beach	1
2011-10-23	Pan American Games	Guadalajara	4
2012-03-03	Pan American Cup	Clermont	6
2012-03-24	World Cup	Mooloolaba	8
2012-04-14	World Triathlon Series	Sydney	4
2012-05-10	World Triathlon Series	San Diego	51
2012-06-17	World Cup	Banyoles	1
2012-06-23	World Triathlon Series	Kitzbühel	11
2012-08-04	Olympic Games	London	38
2012-09-29	World Triathlon Series	Yokohama	8
2012-10-20	WTS Grand Final	Auckland	2
2013-02-23	Oceania Championships	Devonport	2
2013-03-20	USA National Championships	San Diego	1
2013-04-06	World Triathlon Series	Auckland	DNF
2013-05-19	World Triathlon Series	San Diego	1
2013-05-11	World Triathlon Series	Yokohama	1
2013-06-01	World Triathlon Series	Madrid	4
2013-07-06	World Triathlon Series	Kitzbühel	18
2013-07-20	World Triathlon Series	Hamburg	6
2013-07-21	Mixed Relay World Championships	Hamburg	3
2013-08-24	World Triathlon Series	Stockholm	1
2013-09-11	WTS Grand Final	London	DNF
2014-03-15	World Cup	Mooloolaba	1
2014-04-06	World Triathlon Series	Auckland	12
2014-04-26	World Triathlon Series	Cape Town	3
2014-05-17	World Triathlon Series	Yokohama	1
2014-05-31	World Triathlon Series	London	1
2014-06-28	World Triathlon Series	Chicago	1
2014-07-12	World Triathlon Series	Hamburg	1
2014-08-30	World Triathlon Series	Edmonton	1
2015-03-06	World Triathlon Series	Abu Dhabi	1
2015-03-28	World Triathlon Series	Auckland	1
2015-04-11	World Triathlon Series	Gold Coast	1
2015-05-16	World Triathlon Series	Yokohama	1
2015-05-60	World Triathlon Series	London	1
2015-07-18	World Triathlon Series	Hamburg	1
2015-08-02	ITU World Olympic Qualification Event	Rio de Janeiro	1
2015-09-18	World Triathlon Series	Chicago	1
2016-04-02	World Cup	New Plymouth	1
2016-04-09	World Triathlon Series	Gold Coast	2
2016-05-14	World Triathlon Series	Yokohama	1
2016-06-11	World Triathlon Series	Leeds	1
2016-07-16	World Triathlon Series	Hamburg	3
2016-07-16	Mixed Relay World Championships	Hamburg	1
2016-08-20	Olympic Games	Rio	1

DNF = Did not finish
