= Charlotte McShane =

Australian triathlete

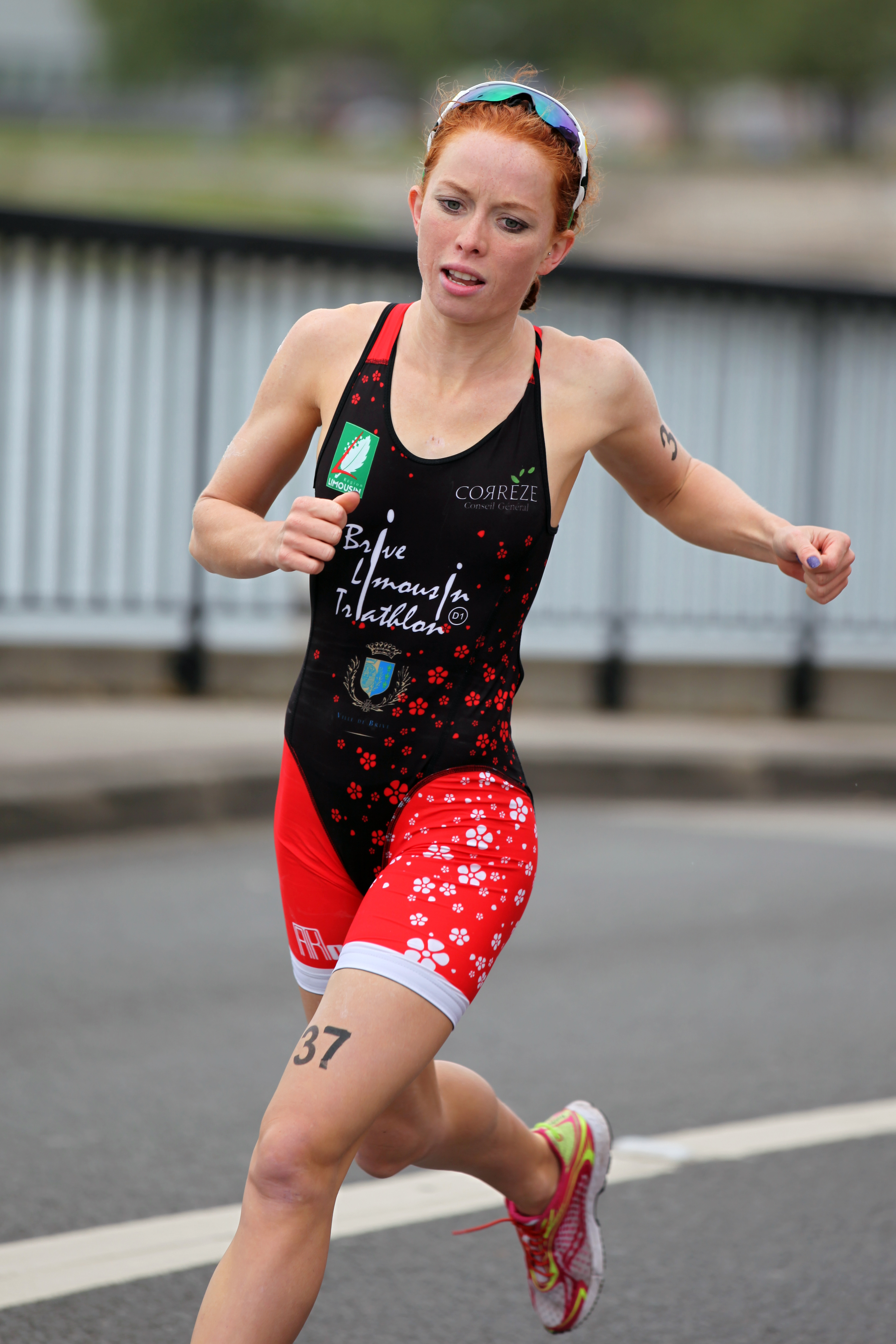
Charlotte McShane placing 25th at the Grand Prix opening in Dunkirk, 2013.

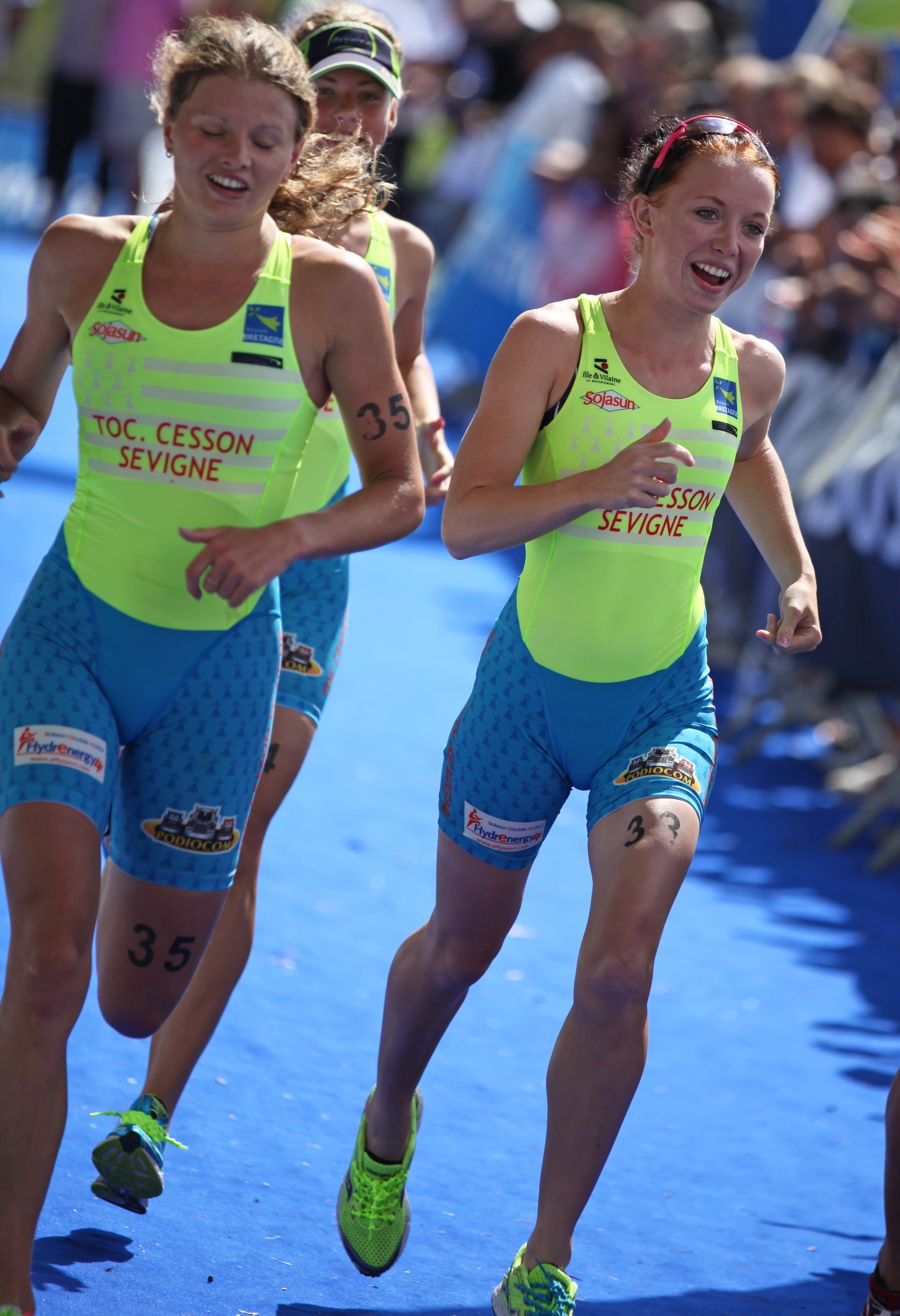
Charlotte McShane with Mariya Shorets in Tour, 2011.

Charlotte McShane (born 14 August 1990 in Wick, Scotland) is a Scottish-born Australian professional triathlete and the 2013 U23 ITU World Triathlon Champion and the 2008 Xterra U20 World Champion.

McShane grew up in Helensburgh, Scotland, and moved to the Bairnsdale, Victoria area in 2005. She now lives in both Wollongong, New South Wales and Vitoria-Gasteiz, Spain. Her coach is the NSWIS head coach, Jamie Turner.

== Sports career ==
In 2001, McShane watched her father Frank compete at Kona and from then on she knew triathlon would be her passion. She was a student at Glasgow School of Sport, and won several Scottish national junior titles. In November 2005, her family moved to Australia and despite her young age, McShane started competing in long-distance triathlons.

In 2008, at the age of 18, McShane became the U20 Xterra World Triathlon Champion, and was 2nd Amateur Female overall (16th including pro's) (26 October 2008, Wailea Maui) and placed 4th at the Elite Female Yeppoon 70.3 Half Ironman, 4th at the Elite Female Canberra 70.3 Half Ironman, and 6th at the Elite Female Oceania Long Distance Championships in Huskisson.

In 2009, McShane still concentrated on long-distance competitions, winning the gold medals at the Elite Female Victorian Olympic Distance Triathlon Championships, at the Elite Female Murrayman South Australian Long Distance Championships, and at the Elite Female Northern Territory Long Distance Championships. She placed 3rd at the Elite Female Shepparton 70.3 Half Ironman, and 4th at the Elite Female Canberra 70.3 Half Ironman.

In 2010, McShane returned to the Olympic Distance (Elite category) and took part in several ITU races. At Geneva, she won the European Cup silver medal and at the Grand Final of the World Championship Series in Budapest, she represented Australia in the U23 category, despite having crashed during the cycle and breaking her ribs.

In 2013, McShane finished 20th overall in the ITU World Series rankings, finishing 9th in Auckland, 10th in Yokohama, 18th in Madrid, and 13th in Stockholm. She then won the ITU U23 World Championships in London.

She competed at the 2022 Commonwealth Games where she came 11th in the women's event.

== ITU competitions ==
From 2006 to 2012, McShane took part in 37 ITU events and achieved 16 top ten positions. By June 2013, McShane achieved two top ten positions in the World Triathlon circuit (Yokohama, Madrid).

The following list is based upon the official ITU rankings and the ITU Athletes' Profile Page. Unless indicated otherwise, the following events are triathlons (Olympic Distance) and refer to the Elite category.

Date	Competition	Place	Rank
2006-02-19	Oceania Cup (Junior)	Hobart	15
2009-02-22	Long Distance Oceania Championships	Huskisson	8
2009-10-21	Long Distance World Championships	Perth	13
2010-03-13	Oceania Championships (U23)	Wellington	7
2010-03-27	World Cup	Mooloolaba	DNF
2010-05-23	European Cup	Strathclyde	3
2010-05-30	African Cup	Larache	5
2010-06-12	Premium European Cup	Pontevedra	20
2010-06-27	Premium European Cup	Brasschaat	8
2010-07-10	World Cup	Holten	26
2010-08-08	World Cup	Tiszaújváros	22
2010-08-15	European Cup	Geneva	2
2010-09-08	Dextro Energy World Championship Series, Grand Final: U23 World Championships	Budapest	25
2010-09-25	Premium Pan American Cup	Tuscaloosa	DNF
2010-10-10	World Cup	Huatulco	20
2011-03-12	Oceania Championships	Wellington	5
2011-03-26	World Cup	Mooloolaba	DNF
2011-04-17	World Cup	Ishigaki	15
2011-05-08	World Cup	Monterrey	43
2011-05-29	Premium European Cup	Brasschaat	23
2011-07-10	World Cup	Edmonton	29
2011-07-24	European Cup	Geneva	7
2011-08-14	World Cup	Tiszaújváros	27
2011-09-24	Pan American Cup	Buffalo	4
2011-10-09	Pan American Cup	Myrtle Beach	2
2012-02-05	Oceania Cup	Kinloch	17
2012-02-12	Sprint Premium Oceania Cup	Geelong	10
2012-03-10	Oceania Championships	Devonport	7
2012-03-24	World Cup	Mooloolaba	25
2012-04-14	World Triathlon Series	Sydney	59
2012-06-10	Sprint European Cup	Cremona	4
2012-06-17	World Cup	Banyoles	14
2012-07-14	World Cup	Tiszaujvaros	4
2012-07-22	European Cup	Geneva	5
2012-08-25	World Triathlon Series	Stockholm	35
2012-09-22	World Cup	Tongyeong	4
2012-10-20	World Triathlon Series, Grand Final: U23 Championship	Auckland	12
2013-02-23	Sprint Oceania Championships	Devonport	4
2013-03-09	Oceania Championships	Wellington	5
2013-03-16	World Cup	Mooloolaba	7
2013-04-06	World Triathlon	Auckland	9
2013-05-11	World Triathlon	Yokohama	10
2013-06-01	World Triathlon	Madrid	18

DNF = did not finish · DNS = did not start
