= Tyler Smith (triathlete) =

Bermudan triathlete (born 1998)

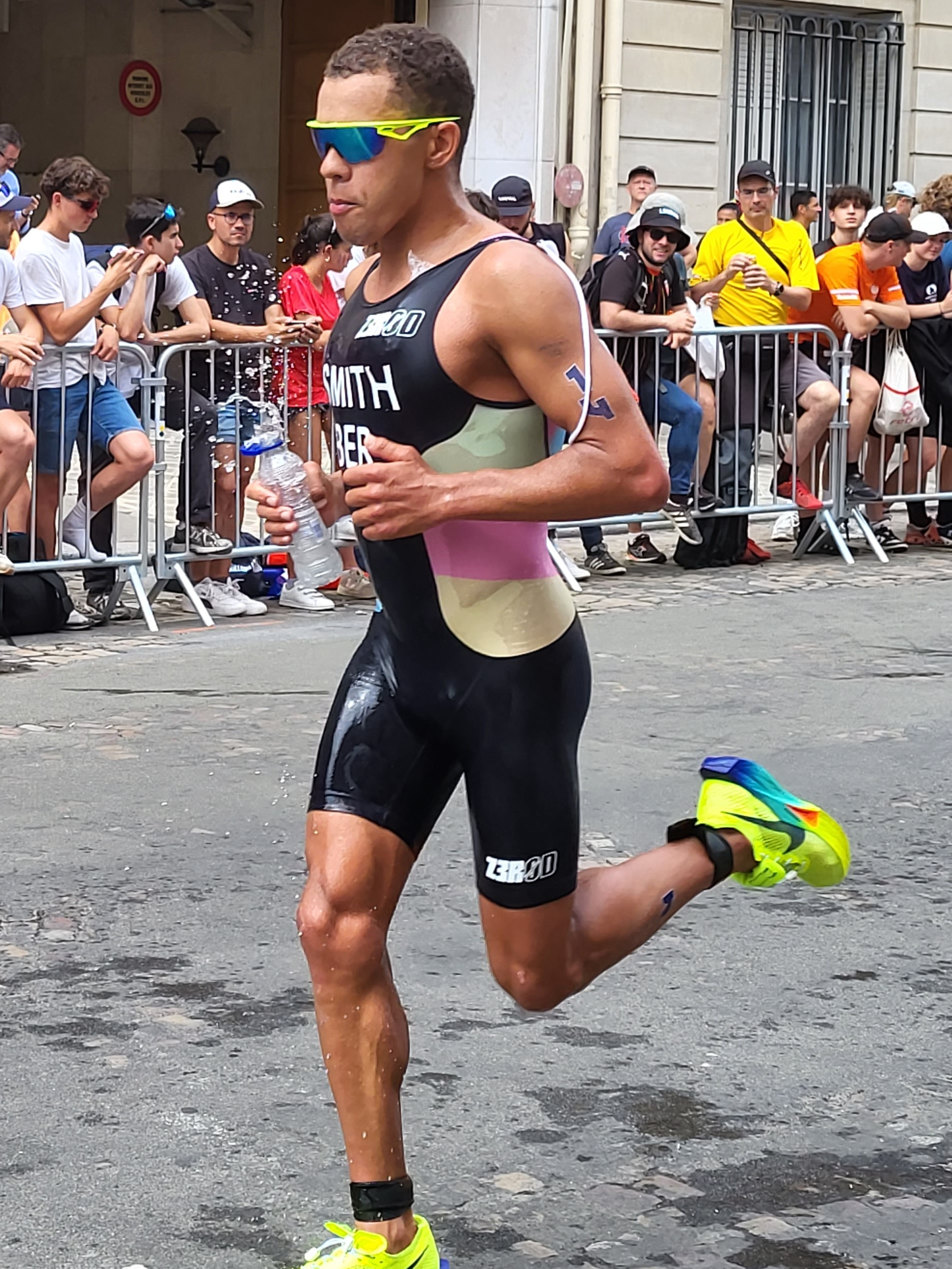
- Smith competing at the 2024 Olympic Summer Games in Paris

Personal information
- Nationality: Bermudan
- Born: 26 September 1998 (age 28)
- Education: University of Leeds

Sport
- Country: Bermuda
- Sport: Triathlon
Medal record
Representing Bermuda
Men's triathlon
Central American and Caribbean Games
Bronze medal – third place	2026 Santo Domingo	Individual

Tyler Smith (born 26 September 1998) is a Bermudan triathlete.

== Career ==
He competed in the individual and mixed relay events in Nanjing at the 2014 Youth Olympics. In 2018, he finished second at the British Universities and Colleges Sport [BUCS] Triathlon Standard Distance Championships in Southport. He was the youngest member of the Bermuda team at the 2018 Commonwealth Games in Australia, and finished in 21st place.

In August 2022, he was part of Bermuda’s mixed relay team at the 2022 Commonwealth Games in Birmingham, England which finished in seventh overall. He also finished in thirteenth place in the individual event, despite suffering a broken wrist and an Achilles injury during preparation for the event.

He finished 25th in the World Triathlon Cup Huatulco in Mexico in June 2023. In September 2023, he finished ninth at the 2023 Americas Triathlon Championships in Veracruz, Mexico. In October 2023, he finished sixteenth at the World Triathlon Cup Brasilia. He was selected for the 2023 Pan American Games in Santiago and he finished in seventh place overall.

In March 2024, he finished tenth in the Americas Triathlon Championships Miami and followed that with sixth in the Americas Triathlon Cup La Paz, in Mexico.

In May 2024, he was invited to compete at the 2024 Olympic Games in Paris. Smith won the bronze medal in individual at the 2026 Central American and Caribbean Games.

== Personal life ==
He graduated from Leeds University with a degree in Sports Science and Physiology in 2020.
