= Flora Duffy =

Bermudian triathlete (born 1987)

Dame Flora Duffy DBE
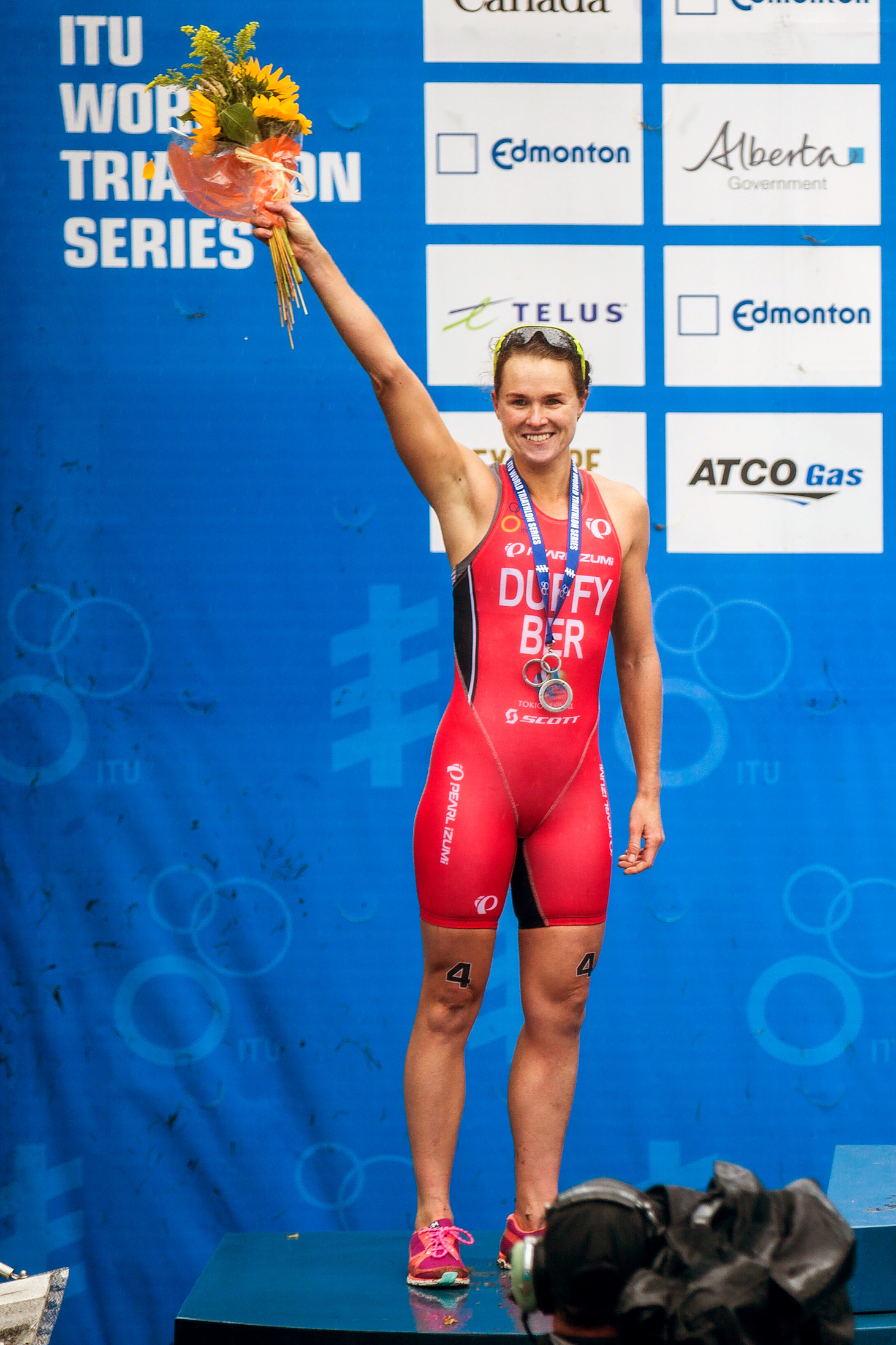
- Duffy at the World Triathlon Series Tour 2015 - Edmonton

Personal information
- Born: Flora Jane Duffy; 30 September 1987 (age 38) Paget Parish, Bermuda
- Height: 1.62 m (5 ft 4 in)
- Weight: 55 kg (121 lb)
- Website: theflorafund.com

Sport
- Country: Bermuda
- Sport: Triathlon
- Turned pro: 2013
- Coached by: Nate Wilson & Ernie Gruhn

Achievements and titles
- Highest world ranking: 1
Medal record
Women's triathlon
Representing Bermuda
Olympic Games
Gold medal – first place	2020 Tokyo	Individual
ITU Triathlon World Championships
Gold medal – first place	2022	Elite
Gold medal – first place	2021	Elite
Gold medal – first place	2017	Elite
Gold medal – first place	2016	Elite
Silver medal – second place	2020	Elite
Silver medal – second place	2006	Junior
ITU Cross Triathlon World Championships
Gold medal – first place	2016	Elite
Gold medal – first place	2015	Elite
Silver medal – second place	2014	Elite
XTERRA Triathlon World Championships
Gold medal – first place	2021	Elite
Gold medal – first place	2019	Elite
Gold medal – first place	2017	Elite
Gold medal – first place	2016	Elite
Gold medal – first place	2015	Elite
Gold medal – first place	2014	Elite
Bronze medal – third place	2013	Elite
Commonwealth Games
Gold medal – first place	2018 Gold Coast	Women's
Gold medal – first place	2022 Birmingham	Women's
Pan American Games
Bronze medal – third place	2015 Toronto	Women's
Central American and Caribbean Games
Silver medal – second place	2010 Mayagüez	Individual

Dame Flora Jane Duffy DBE (born 30 September 1987) is a Bermudian professional triathlete. She won a gold medal at the 2020 Summer Olympics in Tokyo, Bermuda's first gold medal. She also competed in the Beijing, London, and Rio de Janeiro Olympics. In 2018, she won gold in the women's triathlon at the XXI Commonwealth Games in Australia. She also won gold in the same event at the XXII Commonwealth Games in Birmingham in 2022.

== Athletic career ==
Duffy is the 2016 and 2017 ITU World Triathlon Series World Champion, the 2015 and 2016 ITU Cross Triathlon World Champion, and a six-time winner (2014–2017, 2019, 2021) of the XTERRA World Championships.

She competed for Bermuda at the 2008 Summer Olympics in Beijing, the 2012 Summer Olympics in London, the 2016 Summer Olympics in Rio de Janeiro, and the 2020 Summer Olympics in Tokyo, where she won gold. It was Duffy's first Olympic medal and Bermuda's first gold medal. Duffy's medal also made Bermuda the smallest country in the world to have won a gold medal at the Summer Olympics.

In April 2018, Duffy won the first gold medal of the XXI Commonwealth Games in Gold Coast, Australia. Duffy won the women's sprint triathlon by a 43-second lead, becoming Bermuda's first female Commonwealth gold medalist. She was also scheduled to compete in the women's cross-country mountain bike at the Commonwealth Games, but did not start the event.

Duffy is the only person to win three triathlon world titles in the same year in 2016, claiming the WTS, ITU Cross Triathlon, and Xterra titles in close succession. Duffy is the only triathlete in WTS history to post the fastest swim, bike, and run portions in the same race. Duffy holds the record for the largest winning margin in both Olympic and Sprint distance races in a WTS event.

Duffy was appointed Officer of the Order of the British Empire (OBE) in the 2018 Birthday Honours and Dame Commander of the Order of the British Empire (DBE) in the 2022 New Year Honours, both for services to sport in Bermuda. After beating Georgia Taylor-Brown, she was crowned as the ITU Triathlon World Champion on November 25, 2022, in Abu Dhabi.

She competed in the women's triathlon at the 2024 Summer Olympics in Paris, France.

== Legacy ==
The Dame Flora Duffy National Sports Centre (including the Flora Duffy South Field Stadium) in Devonshire Parish is named for her.

== Personal life ==
Duffy is of English parentage: her father is from Barrow-in-Furness, and her mother is from Burnley. She was eligible to represent Great Britain but opted to represent Bermuda, where she grew up. Duffy was privately educated at the independent Warwick Academy in Bermuda, then abroad at the independent Kelly College in England and the University of Colorado in the United States. Duffy graduated from Colorado with a BA in sociology.

Duffy launched The Flora Fund days after winning the inaugural WTS Bermuda in April 2018. The fund is set up to help youth in Bermuda to pursue their potential, ultimately contributing to a healthier, more ambitious community.

In December 2017, Duffy married South African triathlete Dan Hugo in Stellenbosch, Hugo's hometown. They live in both Stellenbosch and Boulder.
