= Aaron Royle =

Australian triathlete

Personal information
- Full name: Aaron John Royle
- Nicknames: Bugs, Royles
- National team: Australia
- Born: 26 January 1990 (age 36) Newcastle, New South Wales, Australia
- Agent: Shawn Smith
- Height: 180 cm (5 ft 11 in)
- Weight: 68 kg (150 lb; 10 st 10 lb)
- Spouse: Non Stanford (m. 2022)
- Website: www.aaronroyle.com

Sport
- Country: Australia
- Sport: Triathlon
- Turned pro: 2010
- Coached by: Dr. Dan Plews

Aaron Royle (born 26 January 1990) is an Australian professional triathlete who has made significant accomplishments in the sport of triathlon. Royle has represented Australia in numerous international competitions, including the Olympic Games, the Commonwealth Games, and the ITU World Triathlon Series. Known for his exceptional running and swimming abilities, Royle has become one of the most respected and accomplished triathletes in Australia's history.

== Early life and career ==
Aaron Royle was born on 26 January 1990 in Newcastle, New South Wales, Australia. He first started participating in triathlons at a young age, inspired by his father, who was an avid triathlete. Royle's natural talent for the sport was quickly recognised, and he began competing in local and regional competitions throughout his teenage years.

He attended the Hunter Sports High School, where he excelled both academically and athletically. After graduating, Royle decided to pursue a career in professional triathlon and moved to the Australian Institute of Sport (AIS) in Canberra to further his training and development.

== Professional career ==
=== ITU World Triathlon Series ===
Aaron Royle began his professional career competing in the ITU World Triathlon Series. He made his debut in 2010 at the age of 20 and has since consistently performed well, earning several top-ten finishes and multiple podium placements. Royle's success in the World Triathlon Series has established him as a leading contender in the sport of triathlon.

=== Olympic Games ===
Royle's Olympic debut came in the 2016 Rio de Janeiro Games, where he finished in 9th place, an impressive result for a first-time Olympian. He continued to represent Australia in the 2020 Tokyo Olympics, where he placed 13th in a highly competitive field. Royle's consistent performances have earned him a reputation as a reliable and strong competitor on the international stage.

== Youth career ==
He is a former under-23 world champion.

== 2014 season ==
Royle took third at the event in Auckland in the 2014 ITU World Triathlon Series.

He won a bronze in the mixed relay at the 2014 Commonwealth Games.

== 2015 season ==
Royle took third at the event in Stockholm in the 2015 ITU World Triathlon Series.

== 2016 season ==
Royle took third at the event in Leeds in the 2016 ITU World Triathlon Series.

He competed at the 2016 Olympics where he finished 9th.

== 2021 season ==
Royle competed in the men's triathlon at the 2020 Summer Olympics held in Tokyo, Japan. Royle also competed in the 2021 Super League Triathlon Championship Series, where he finished 13th.
