= Tyler Butterfield =

Bermudian racing cyclist and triathlete

Personal information
- Full name: Tyler Barbour Butterfield
- Born: February 12, 1983 (age 43) Pembroke Parish, Bermuda
- Height: 1.81 m (5 ft 11 1/2 in)
- Weight: 75 kg (165 lb)

Sport
- Country: Bermuda
- Sport: Triathlon
Medal record
Men's Triathlon
Representing Bermuda
Central American and Caribbean Games
Bronze medal – third place	2010 Mayagüez	Individual
- Updated on 21 July 2012

Tyler Barbour Butterfield (born February 12, 1983) is a Bermudian road cyclist and triathlete. He became Bermuda's first ever professional triathlete in 2002. He was voted Bermuda's male athlete of the year in 2006 and 2013. Butterfield was the youngest male competitor at the second Olympic triathlon at the 2004 Summer Olympics. He placed thirty-fifth with a total time of 1:58:26.99.

Butterfield was born in Pembroke Parish. In 2007, he competed for Team Slipstream, a UCI Professional Continental Team. In 2006, he raced as an amateur cyclist for the Vendee U team based in France. He finished 11th in the cycling road race at the 2006 Commonwealth Games in Melbourne. At the 2012 Summer Olympics, he again competed in the men's triathlon, finishing in thirty-fourth with a time of 1:50:32. Following the 2012 Games, Butterfield elected to focus on long-course triathlons. In 2013 Butterfield finished seventh at the Ironman World Championship on his debut and ninth in the Ironman 70.3 World Championship. At the 2014 Commonwealth Games, he finished in 19th place.

Butterfield's father, Jim, competed in rowing for Bermuda at the 1972 Summer Olympics, before switching to the marathon (finishing 17th in the event at the 1978 Commonwealth Games) and to triathlon, finishing seventh in the 1981 Hawaii Ironman. His mother Debbie finished fourth in the 1985 Boston Marathon and set a personal best of 2:38 in the same year. His wife Nikki Butterfield-Egyed won the 2011 Ironman 70.3 Syracuse, five months after giving birth to the couple's daughter Savana and went on to win the 2012 Abu Dhabi International Triathlon. She made a second return to the sport in 2014, finishing third at the Ironman 70.3 Mandurah Australian Pro Championship less than 10 months after the birth of the couple's son Walker, but she subsequently announced her decision to retire from professional competition in January 2015.

== Victories ==
2004

- Grand Prix Bermuda Cycling Race,

2005

- La Veriers - Les Essarts

2006

- Tour du Guadeloupe, Stage 1

2012

- PATCO Triathlon Pan American Championships

2014

- Abu Dhabi International Triathlon
