= Erica Hawley =

Bermudian triathlete (born 1998)

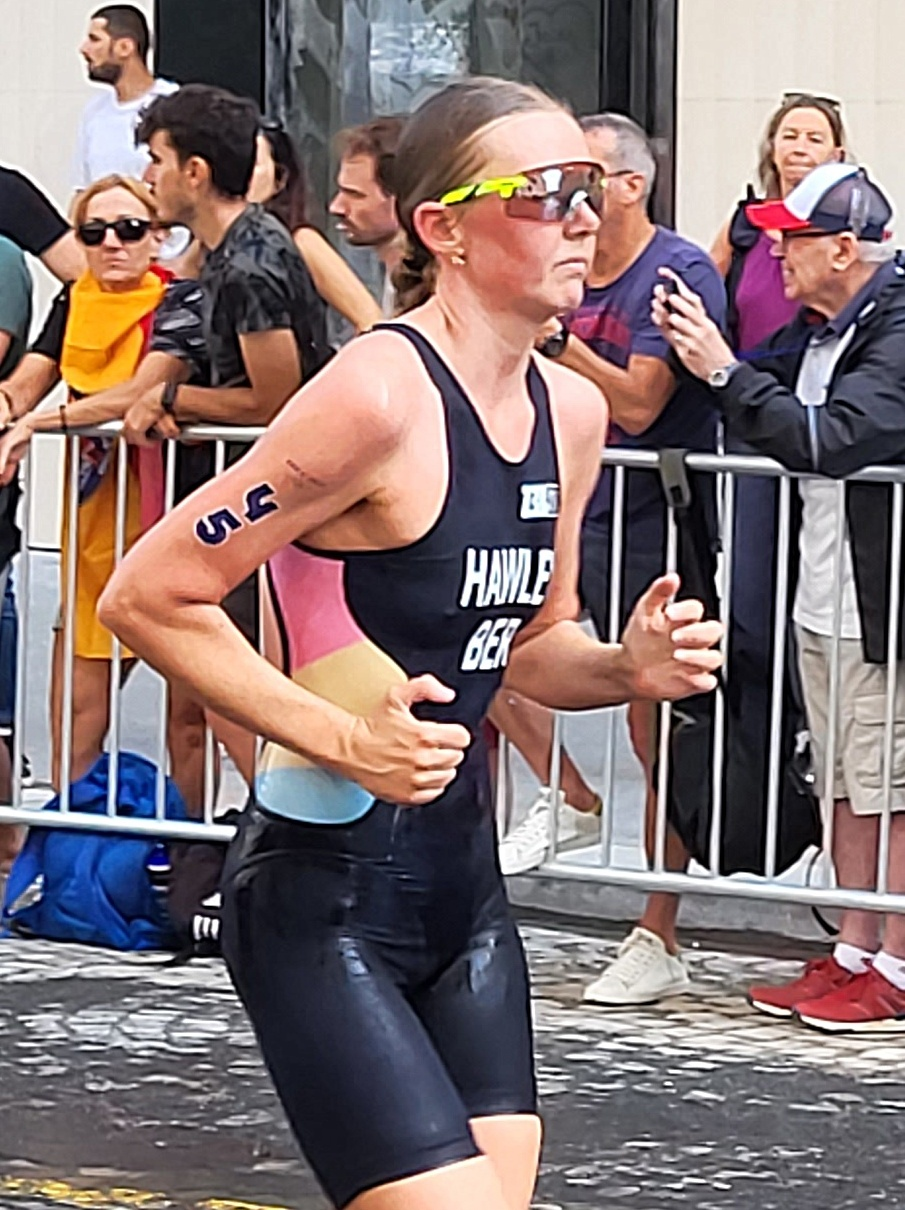
- Hawley at the Olympic triathlon in 2024

Personal information
- Nationality: Bermudian
- Born: 29 May 1998 (age 28)
- Education: University of Colorado Boulder

Sport
- Country: Bermuda
- Sport: Triathlon

Erica Hawley (born 29 May 1998) is a Bermudian triathlete.

== Career ==
She competed in the individual and mixed relay events in Nanjing at the 2014 Youth Olympics.

She made her World Triathlon Series debut in Edmonton, Canada, in 2018. She competed at the 2018 Commonwealth Games and the 2019 Pan American Games, where she obtained finishing positions of 16th and 21st. She had a 22nd-place finish in the Under-23 World Triathlon Championship Finals in Edmonton, Canada, in August 2021.

She started competing professionally in 2022. She finished third in the Americas Triathlon Cup Long Beach in California in July 2022. In August 2022, she was part of Bermuda’s mixed relay team at the 2022 Commonwealth Games in Birmingham, England which finished in seventh overall. she also finished 16th at the Commonwealth Games in the individual event. She had an eighth-place finish at the Americas Championships in Montevideo, Uruguay in October 2022. She took part in the World Triathlon Championship Series event in Bermuda in November 2022.

In May 2023, Hawley has become the first recipient of the inaugural Carey Olsen Bermuda Limited Athletics Scholarship. She finished eleventh in the World Triathlon Cup Huatulco in Mexico in June 2023. She won the Americas Triathlon Cup in Montreal in July 2023. In August 2023, she had a podium finish at the inaugural World Triathlon Cup Yeongdo in South Korea. She was selected for the 2023 Pan American Games in Santiago. She finished in fourth place overall in a time of 1:58.18. In November 2023, Hawley was awarded sixth place in the elite women’s race at the World Cup Triathlon Vina del Mar in Chile.

In May 2024, she qualified to compete at the 2024 Paris Olympics. She competed in the women's triathlon at the Olympics.

== Personal life ==
She attended the University of Colorado Boulder, in Boulder, Colorado.

She is the owner of a rescued cat named Margarita, whose photos she frequently shares on social media.
