= Bermuda at the 1930 British Empire Games =

Flag of Bermuda

Bermuda competed at the 1930 British Empire Games in Hamilton, Ontario, Canada, from 16 August to 23 August 1930.

== Medals ==
| | Gold | Silver | Bronze | Total |
|---|---|---|---|---|
| Bermuda | 0 | 0 | 0 | 0 |

== Athletics ==
Men's 100 Yard Dash

- David Belvin - 5th in Heat 2

== See also ==
- Bermuda at the Commonwealth Games
