= 2017 European Triathlon Championships =

2017 Europe Triathlon Championship
- Location: Geneva, Switzerland
- Date: 16-18 June 2017

The 2017 European Triathlon Championships was held in Kitzbühel, Austria from 16 June to 18 June 2017.

== Medallists ==
Event	Gold		Silver		Bronze	
Elite
Men	João Pereira (POR)	1:45:31	Raphaël Montoya (FRA)	1:45:32	João Silva (POR)	1:45:35
Women	Jessica Learmonth (GBR)	1:57:50	Sophie Coldwell (GBR)	1:58:05	Alice Betto (ITA)	1:58:31
Mixed Relay	Denmark; Anne Holm; Andreas Schilling; Sif Bendix Madsen; Emil Deleuran Hansen	1:15:17	France; Cassandre Beaugrand; Simon Viain; Emilie Morier; Raphael Montoya	1:15:24	Russia; Anastasia Gorbunova; Dmitry Polyanskiy; Anastasia Abrosimova; Vladimir Turbaevskiy	1:15:32
Junior
Men	Vasco Vilaça (POR)	53:39	Javier Lluch Pérez (ESP)	53:40	Csongor Lehmann (HUN)	53:40
Women	Kate Waugh (GBR)	59:20	Sif Bendix Madsen (DEN)	59:23	Jessica Fullagar (FRA)	59:34
Mixed Relay	Hungary; Lili Mátyus; Gergő Soós; Dorka Putnóczki; Csongor Lehmann	1:18:31	Russia; Daria Lushnikova; Mikhail Antipov; Ekaterina Matiukh; Grigory Antipov	1:19:01	Germany; Bianca Bogen; Moritz Horn; Nina Eim; Tim Siepmann	1:19:15

== Results ==
=== Men's ===
Key

- # denotes the athlete's bib number for the event
- Swimming denotes the time it took the athlete to complete the swimming leg
- Cycling denotes the time it took the athlete to complete the cycling leg
- Running denotes the time it took the athlete to complete the running leg
- Difference denotes the time difference between the athlete and the event winner
- Lapped denotes that the athlete was lapped and removed from the course

Rank	#	Triathlete	Swimming	Cycling	Running	Total time	Difference
1st place, gold medalist(s)	4	Joao Pereira (POR)	18:52	53:34	31:54	1:45:31	—
2nd place, silver medalist(s)	21	Raphael Montoya (FRA)	18:49	53:36	31:52	1:45:32	+0:01
3rd place, bronze medalist(s)	5	Joao Silva (POR)	18:57	53:29	31:58	1:45:35	+0:04
4	9	Vicente Hernandez (ESP)	18:49	53:35	32:02	1:45:40	+0:09
5	10	Uxio Abuin Ares (ESP)	18:44	53:42	32:12	1:45:47	+0:16
6	7	Fernando Alarza (ESP)	19:25	53:47	31:29	1:45:51	+0:20
7	6	Rostislav Pevtsov (AZE)	19:11	54:03	31:32	1:45:54	+0:23
8	17	Antonio Serrat Seoane (ESP)	19:00	53:29	32:32	1:46:12	+0:81
9	16	Shachar Sagiv (ISR)	19:21	53:46	32:01	1:46:16	+0:85
10	1	Dmitry Polyanskiy (RUS)	18:38	53:49	32:45	1:46:21	+0:90
11	11	Simon Vlain (FRA)	19:23	53:47	32:12	1:46:33	+1:02
12	20	Vladimir Turbayevskiy (RUS)	18:46	54:22	32:24	1:46:47	+1:16
13	18	Léo Bergere (FRA)	19:00	53:26	33:18	1:46:50	+1:19
14	8	Andreas Schilling (DEN)	19:04	53:21	33:16	1:46:51	+1:20
15	37	Ivan Ivanov (UKR)	19:02	53:20	33:12	1:46:51	+1:20
16	28	Alois Knabl (AUT)	18:41	53:44	33:18	1:46:52	+1:21
17	3	Igor Polyanskiy (RUS)	18:39	53:44	33:16	1:46:52	+1:21
18	39	Alexander Bryukhankov (RUS)	19:13	53:39	32:27	1:46:54	+1:23
19	14	Lukas Hollaus (AUT)	19:23	53:48	33:04	1:47:20	+1:89
20	38	Sylvain Fridelance (SUI)	19:00	53:25	33:49	1:47:25	+1:94
21	40	James Teagle (GBR)	19:16	47:00	33:01	1:47:27	+1:96
22	49	Roee Zuaretz (ISR)	19:15	53:55	33:06	1:47:30	+1:99
23	15	Adrien Briffod (SUI)	19:10	54:00	33:34	1:47:50	+2:19
24	2	Andrea Salvisberg (SUI)	18:43	53:41	34:31	1:48:03	+2:72
25	25	Justus Nieschlag (GER)	18:42	53:44	34:43	1:48:15	+2:84
26	29	Bob Haller (LUX)	19:25	53:48	33:53	1:48:21	+2:90
27	33	Christophe De Keyser (BEL)	19:20	53:49	34:07	1:48:23	+2:92
28	27	Jan Celustka (CZE)	19:20	53:51	34:07	1:48:30	+2:99
29	43	Douglas Roberts (GBR)	19:14	53:54	34:15	1:48:35	+3:04
30	45	Denis Vasiliev (RUS)	18:41	53:42	35:08	1:48:44	+3:13
31	32	Erwin Vanderplancke (BEL)	19:17	53:56	34:40	1:48:58	+3:27
32	26	Lukas Pretl (AUT)	19:21	53:50	34:53	1:49:09	+3:78
33	23	Marco Van Der Stel (NED)	18:45	53:41	36:04	1:49:44	+4:13
34	53	Frantisek Linduska (CZE)	19:18	53:52	36:12	1:50:37	+5:06
35	50	Jan Volar (CZE)	18:54	53:31	37:26	1:51:07	+5:76
36	31	Gregory Barnaby (ITA)	18:59	54:11	36:58	1:51:18	+5:87
37	22	Bence Bicsák (HUN)	19:32	57:38	33:10	1:51:30	+5:99
38	36	Gustav Iden (NOR)	19:32	56:31	34:38	1:51:53	+6:22
39	48	Martin Dernuth (AUT)	19:08	54:02	37:41	1:52:03	+6:72
40	47	Pedro Afonso Gaspar (POR)	19:17	57:51	35:10	1:53:33	+8:02
41	41	Fabian Villanueva Moehl (MEX)	19:30	57:39	36:05	1:54:22	+8:91
42	34	Luca Facchinetti (ITA)	19:06	58:02	36:11	1:54:31	+9:00
43	19	Simon De Cuyper (BEL)	20:55	56:11	36:58	1:55:14	+9:83
44	55	Sergiy Kurochkin (UKR)	19:27	59:18	35:20	1:55:24	+9:93
45	51	Alberto Eugenio Casillas Garcia (LTU)	20:55	56:11	37:26	1:55:44	+10:13
46	52	Jamie González Buganza (MEX)	19:22	57:47	38:25	1:56:47	+11:16
47	54	Jakub Powada (CZE)	19:31	59:18	37:55	1:57:54	+12:23
—	35	Miguel Arraiolos (POR)	20:13	56:55	did not finish		
—	12	Richard Varga (SVK)	18:36	53:47	did not finish		
—	24	Russell White (IRL)	19:23	did not finish			
—	42	Oleksiy Syutkin (UKR)	19:31	did not finish			
—	44	Dornen Dornik (SLO)	18:57	did not advance			
—	46	Juan Alejandro Delgado Vallejo (MEX)	19:08	Lapped			
Source: Official results

=== Women's ===
Key

- # denotes the athlete's bib number for the event
- Swimming denotes the time it took the athlete to complete the swimming leg
- Cycling denotes the time it took the athlete to complete the cycling leg
- Running denotes the time it took the athlete to complete the running leg
- Difference denotes the time difference between the athlete and the event winner
- Lapped denotes that the athlete was lapped and removed from the course

Rank	#	Triathlete	Swimming	Cycling	Running	Total time	Difference
1st place, gold medalist(s)	8	Jessica Learmonth (GBR)	19:09	1:00:11	37:14	1:57:50	
2nd place, silver medalist(s)	15	Sophie Coldwell (GBR)	19:49	59:34	37:27	1:58:05	+0:15
3rd place, bronze medalist(s)	14	Alice Betto (ITA)	19:45	59:36	37:53	1:58:31	+0:41
4	3	Vendula Frintová (CZE)	20:53	1:00:44	35:51	1:58:41	+0:51
5	9	Claire Michel (BEL)	20:56	1:00:45	35:44	1:58:41	+0:51
6	6	Jolanda Annen (SUI)	20:18	1:01:21	35:55	1:58:47	+0:57
7	7	Sara Vilic (AUT)	20:51	1:00:46	36:08	1:59:00	+1:10
8	10	Anastasia Abrosimova (RUS)	19:50	1:01:51	36:29	1:59:24	+1:34
9	2	Zsófia Kovács (HUN)	21:00	1:00:43	36:30	1:59:28	+1:38
10	23	Cassandre Beaugrand (FRA)	20:05	1:03:13	34:59	1:59:37	+1:47
11	19	Anastasia Gorbunova (RUS)	19:27	59:52	39:06	1:59:46	+1:56
12	11	Elena Danilova (RUS)	21:00	1:00:39	37:15	2:00:13	+2:23
13	12	Lisa Perterer (AUT)	20:59	1:00:41	37:29	2:00:24	+2:34
14	22	Petra Kuříková (CZE)	20:57	1:00:43	37:42	2:00:37	+2:47
15	1	India Lee (GBR)	20:16	1:01:22	38:27	2:01:24	+3:34
16	17	Michelle Flipo	20:56	1:02:16	37:38	2:02:14	+4:24
17	27	Eva Skaza (SLO)	20:48	1:00:47	39:34	2:02:28	+4:38
18	26	Yuliya Golofeeva (RUS)	21:13	1:02:02	38:01	2:02:41	+4:51
19	18	Julia Hauser (AUT)	21:02	1:02:13	38:37	2:03:09	+5:19
20	4	Mariya Shorets (RUS)	21:14	1:02:00	38:46	2:03:19	+5:29
21	24	Lisa Berger (SUI)	21:01	1:00:39	42:08	2:05:07	+7:17
22	20	Sara Pérez (ESP)	20:17	1:01:20	44:13	2:07:13	+9:23
	16	Anna Godoy Contreras (ESP)	20:17	1:01:26	did not finish		
	28	Vanessa Fernandes (POR)	22:20	did not finish			
	21	Kseniia Levkovska (AZE)	21:13	did not finish			
	29	Vira Sosnova (UKR)	23:34	did not finish			
	25	Amalia Sánchez Albo (MEX)	21:12	Lapped			
	30	Margaryta Krylova (UKR)	22:50	Lapped			
Source: Official results
