= 2016 European Triathlon Championships =

2016 Europe Triathlon Championship
- Location: Lisbon, Switzerland
- Date: 26-29 May 2016

The 2016 European Triathlon Championships was held in Lisbon, Portugal from 26 May to 29 May 2016.

== Medallists ==
Event	Gold		Silver		Bronze	
Elite
Men	Javier Gomez Noya (ESP)	1:49:30	Dmitry Polyanskiy (RUS)	1:50:09	Andrea Salvisberg (SUI)	1:50:32
Women	India Lee (GBR)	2:04:03	Yuliya Yelistratova (UKR)	2:04:19	Zsófia Kovács (HUN)	2:04:24
Mixed Relay	United Kingdom; Lucy Hall; Thomas Bishop; India Lee; Grant Sheldon	1:07:03	Russia; Mariya Shorets; Igor Polyanskiy; Alexandra Razarenova; Dmitry Polyanskiy	1:07:08	Hungary; Zsófia Kovács; Tamás Tóth; Margit Vanek; Ákos Vanek	1:07:19
Junior
Men	Javier Lluch Perez (ESP)	0:58:03	Samuel Dickinson (GBR)	0:58:04	Emil Deleuran Hansen (DEN)	0:58:08
Women	Cassandre Beaugrand (FRA)	1:02:42	Lisa Tertsch (GER)	1:02:54	Lena Meißner (GER)	1:03:14
Mixed Relay	United Kingdom; Sian Rainsley; Samuel Dickinson; Kate Waugh; Alex Yee	1:07:48	Spain; Ines Santiago Moron; Alberto Gonzalez Garcia; Cecilia Santamaria Surroca; Javier Lluch Perez	1:07:59	Germany; Lena Meißner; Paul Weindl; Lisa Tertsch; Moritz Horn	1:08:00

== Results ==
=== Men's ===
Key

- # denotes the athlete's bib number for the event
- Swimming denotes the time it took the athlete to complete the swimming leg
- Cycling denotes the time it took the athlete to complete the cycling leg
- Running denotes the time it took the athlete to complete the running leg
- Difference denotes the time difference between the athlete and the event winner
- Lapped denotes that the athlete was lapped and removed from the course

Rank	#	Triathlete	Swimming	Cycling	Running	Total time	Difference
1st place, gold medalist(s)	9	Javier Gomez Noya (ESP)	16:55	0:59:45	31:25	1:49:30	—
2nd place, silver medalist(s)	6	Dmitry Polyanskiy (RUS)	16:51	0:59:51	32:02	1:50:09	+00:39
3rd place, bronze medalist(s)	19	Andrea Salvisberg (SUI)	16:49	0:59:47	32:31	1:50:32	+01:02
4	8	Alessandro Fabian (ITA)	16:58	0:59:51	32:32	1:50:37	+01:07
5	15	Igor Polyanskiy (RUS)	16:46	0:59:47	32:30	1:50:38	+01:08
6	10	Joao Pereira (POR)	17:13	0:59:39	31:00	1:50:39	+01:09
7	16	Joao Silva (POR)	17:07	0:59:51	30:57	1:50:40	+01:10
8	7	Francesc Godoy Contreras (ESP)	16:45	1:01:03	32:40	1:50:48	+01:18
9	14	Rostislav Pevtsov (AZE)	17:14	1:01:09	31:12	1:51:01	+01:31
10	52	Grant Sheldon (GBR)	16:58	0:59:57	31:44	1:51:05	+01:35
11	38	Gianluca Pozzatti (ITA)	16:52	1:01:07	33:01	1:51:09	+01:39
12	4	Richard Varga (SVK)	16:44	1:00:55	33:07	1:51:12	+01:42
13	12	Vicente Hernandez (ESP)	17:10	0:59:48	31:44	1:51:31	+02:01
14	24	Massimo De Ponti (ITA)	17:14	0:59:53	00:00	1:51:46	+02:16
15	48	Marc Austin (GBR)	16:54	1:01:09	34:14	1:51:49	+02:19
16	45	Pedro Palma (POR)	17:18	0:00:00	32:00	1:51:50	+02:20
17	30	Adrien Briffod (SUI)	17:06	0:59:45	32:23	1:52:03	+02:33
18	26	Jonathan Zipf (GER)	17:05	1:01:04	32:19	1:52:05	+02:35
19	5	Thomas Bishop (GBR)	16:50	1:01:10	34:00	1:52:09	+02:39
20	42	Gregory Barnaby (ITA)	17:19	1:01:09	32:32	1:52:14	+02:44
21	36	Raphael Montoya (FRA)	17:06	0:59:46	33:07	1:52:22	+02:52
22	29	Marco Van Der Stel (NED)	17:09	1:00:55	32:46	1:52:24	+02:54
23	23	Jan Celustka (CZE)	17:13	1:01:08	32:50	1:52:29	+02:59
24	33	Antonio Serrat Seoane (ESP)	17:07	1:01:05	33:40	1:52:31	+03:01
25	18	Andreas Schilling (DEN)	17:12	1:01:00	32:45	1:52:34	+03:04
Source: Official results

=== Women's ===
Key

- # denotes the athlete's bib number for the event
- Swimming denotes the time it took the athlete to complete the swimming leg
- Cycling denotes the time it took the athlete to complete the cycling leg
- Running denotes the time it took the athlete to complete the running leg
- Difference denotes the time difference between the athlete and the event winner
- Lapped denotes that the athlete was lapped and removed from the course

0

Rank	#	Triathlete	Swimming	Cycling	Running	Total time	Difference
1st place, gold medalist(s)	20	India Lee (GBR)	18:41	1:06:05	36:57	2:04:03	—
2nd place, silver medalist(s)	6	Yuliya Yelistratova (UKR)	19:11	1:07:09	35:36	2:04:19	+00:16
3rd place, bronze medalist(s)	9	Zsófia Kovács (HUN)	18:53	1:07:43	35:38	2:04:24	+00:21
4	1	Vendula Frintova (CZE)	18:04	1:07:09	36:03	2:04:40	+00:37
5	14	Anne Haug (GER)	19:26	1:07:43	36:03	2:04:45	+00:42
6	7	Alexandra Razarenova (RUS)	19:05	1:08:27	36:03	2:04:51	+00:48
7	25	Heather Sellars (GBR)	18:28	1:07:02	36:13	2:05:04	+01:01
8	11	Mariya Shorets (RUS)	18:29	1:07:21	36:28	2:05:09	+01:06
9	3	Agnieszka Jerzyk (POL)	19:24	1:08:03	36:41	2:05:23	+01:20
10	2	Lucy Hall (GBR)	17:55	1:07:49	38:20	2:05:29	+01:26
11	16	Valentina Zapatrina (RUS)	18:28	1:07:05	36:55	2:05:43	+01:40
12	26	Sara Papais (ITA)	18:09	1:06:58	37:07	2:05:48	+01:45
13	17	Elena Danilova (RUS)	19:08	1:07:57	37:07	2:05:53	+01:50
14	19	Petra Kurikova (CZE)	18:48	1:08:21	37:09	2:06:00	+01:57
15	8	Anastasia Abrosimova (RUS)	18:03	1:07:21	37:12	2:06:02	+01:59
16	24	Anna Godoy Contreras (ESP)	18:06	1:07:42	37:17	2:06:03	+02:00
17	30	Kseniia Levkovska (AZE)	18:05	1:08:27	38:05	2:06:49	+02:46
18	22	Verena Steinhauser (ITA)	18:31	1:08:25	38:42	2:07:23	+03:20
19	15	Melanie Santos (POR)	18:07	1:08:19	39:17	2:08:05	+04:02
20	29	Jessica Learmonth (GBR)	18:08	1:07:52	39:56	2:08:36	+04:33
21	27	Charlotte Deldaele (BEL)	18:40	1:08:24	40:35	2:09:11	+05:08
22	32	Maya Kingma (NED)	18:03	1:08:07	40:57	2:09:39	+05:36
23	21	Maria Czesnik (POL)	18:44	1:07:46	42:42	2:11:22	+07:19
24	34	Sara Perez Sala (ESP)	18:32	1:08:21	43:10	2:12:01	+07:58
25	28	Lisa Berger (SUI)	19:27	1:07:30	42:23	2:13:02	+08:59
Source: Official results
