= Triathlon at the 2016 Summer Olympics – Women's =

Women's triathlon at the Games of the XXXI Olympiad
- Venue: Fort Copacabana, Rio de Janeiro
- Date: 20 August 2016
- Competitors: 55 from 31 nations
- Winning time: 1:56:16

Medalists
1st place, gold medalist(s)		Gwen Jorgensen	United States
2nd place, silver medalist(s)		Nicola Spirig Hug	Switzerland
3rd place, bronze medalist(s)		Vicky Holland	Great Britain

The women's triathlon at the 2016 Summer Olympics took place at Fort Copacabana in Rio de Janeiro on 20 August.

A total of 55 women from 31 nations competed in the race.

The medals were presented by Marisol Casado, IOC member, Spain and Antonio Álvarez, Vice President of the International Triathlon Union.

== Results ==
Rank	#	Triathlete	Swimming	Cycling	Running	Total time	Difference
1st place, gold medalist(s)	20	Gwen Jorgensen (USA)	19:12	1:01:21	34:09	1:56:16	
2nd place, silver medalist(s)	18	Nicola Spirig Hug (SUI)	19:12	1:01:22	34:50	1:56:56	+0:40
3rd place, bronze medalist(s)	14	Vicky Holland (GBR)	19:09	1:01:26	34:54	1:57.01	+0:45
4	16	Non Stanford (GBR)	19:10	1:01:25	34:55	1:57:04	+0:48
5	32	Bárbara Riveros (CHI)	19:13	1:01:24	35:21	1:57:29	+1:13
6	52	Emma Moffatt (AUS)	19:07	1:01:24	35:49	1:57:55	+1:39
7	38	Andrea Hewitt (NZL)	19:04	1:01:28	36:06	1:58:15	+1:59
8	26	Flora Duffy (BER)	19:08	1:01:29	36:15	1:58:25	+2:09
9	29	Claudia Rivas (MEX)	19:05	1:01:27	36:18	1:58:28	+2:12
10	4	Rachel Klamer (NED)	19:10	1:01:19	36:38	1:58:55	+2:39
11	2	Mari Rabie (RSA)	19:04	1:01:32	37:10	1:59:13	+2:57
12	50	Erin Densham (AUS)	19:10	1:01:26	37:18	1:59:27	+3:11
13	39	Nicky Samuels (NZL)	19:06	1:01:27	37:18	1:59:30	+3:14
14	17	Jolanda Annen (SUI)	19:19	1:01:20	37:32	1:59:42	+3:26
15	55	Yuka Sato (JPN)	19:08	1:01:24	37:53	2:00:01	+3:45
16	19	Lisa Nordén (SWE)	19:17	1:01:18	37:55	2:00:03	+3:47
17	36	Charlotte Bonin (ITA)	19:07	1:01:29	38:34	2:00:48	+4:32
18	22	Katie Zaferes (USA)	19:03	1:01:26	38:44	2:00:55	+4:39
19	15	Helen Jenkins (GBR)	19:11	1:04:37	35:45	2:01:07	+4:51
20	7	Alexandra Razarenova (RUS)	19:56	1:03:55	35:44	2:01:09	+4:53
21	23	Aileen Reed (IRL)	19:19	1:04:31	35:48	2:01:14	+4:58
22	1	Agnieszka Jerzyk (POL)	19:50	1:03:59	36:04	2:01:27	+5:11
23	3	Gillian Sanders (RSA)	19:50	1:03:59	36:05	2:01:29	+5:13
24	48	Zsófia Kovács (HUN)	19:20	1:04:29	36:11	2:01:29	+5:13
25	8	Mariya Shorets (RUS)	19:48	1:03:54	36:10	2:01:33	+5:17
26	51	Ashleigh Gentle (AUS)	19:49	1:03:59	36:18	2:01:44	+5:28
27	25	Vendula Frintová (CZE)	19:21	1:04:27	36:29	2:01:49	+5:33
28	47	Laura Lindemann (GER)	19:18	1:04:30	36:27	2:01:52	+5:36
29	37	Annamaria Mazzetti (ITA)	19:42	1:04:08	36:34	2:01:53	+5:37
30	42	Cassandre Beaugrand (FRA)	19:16	1:04:35	36:49	2:02:18	+6:02
31	5	Mateja Šimic (SLO)	19:47	1:03:59	37:08	2:02:28	+6:12
32	6	Anastasia Abrosimova (RUS)	19:05	1:04:44	37:22	2:02:45	+6:29
33	28	Cecilia Pérez (MEX)	19:10	1:04:39	37:26	2:02:47	+6:31
34	11	Amélie Kretz (CAN)	19:10	1:04:39	37:23	2:02:48	+6:32
35	43	Audrey Merle (FRA)	19:19	1:04:31	37:31	2:02:53	+6:37
36	46	Anne Haug (GER)	21:11	1:04:50	35:18	2:02:56	+6:40
37	31	Sara Vilic (AUT)	19:43	1:04:04	37:43	2:03:10	+6:54
38	53	Yuliya Yelistratova (UKR)	20:05	1:05:57	35:51	2:03:27	+7:11
39	56	Ai Ueda (JPN)	21:10	1:04:50	36:03	2:03:37	+7:21
40	9	Pâmella Oliveira (BRA)	19:04	1:04:43	38:40	2:04:03	+7:47
41	12	Kirsten Sweetland (CAN)	19:11	1:04:34	38:49	2:04:16	+8:00
42	10	Sarah-Anne Brault (CAN)	19:49	1:03:56	39:02	2:04:28	+8:12
43	33	Miriam Casillas (ESP)	20:04	1:06:03	37:51	2:05:32	+9:16
44	44	Kaidi Kivioja (EST)	20:07	1:05:55	38:05	2:05:42	+9:26
45	49	Margit Vanek (HUN)	19:10	1:04:35	41:29	2:06:54	+10:38
46	54	Yurie Kato (JPN)	20:06	1:07:13	38:53	2:07:50	+11:34
47	27	Elizabeth Bravo (ECU)	20:10	1:05:54	40:09	2:07:52	+11:36
48	24	Wang Lianyuan (CHN)	20:06	1:05:55	43:32	2:11:12	+14:56
–	34	Ainhoa Murúa (ESP)	19:19	1:04:29	DNF		
–	35	Carolina Routier (ESP)	19:01	Lapped			
–	21	Sarah True (USA)	19:10	Lapped			
–	40	Claire Michel (BEL)	21:11	Lapped			
–	41	Katrien Verstuyft (BEL)	22:08	Lapped			
–	30	Julia Hauser (AUT)	22:08	Lapped			
–	45	Fabienne St Louis (MRI)	25:30	DNF			
Source: Official results
