= World Triathlon Aquathlon Championships =

Aquathlon competition

The World Triathlon Aquathlon Championships is a aquathlon championship competition organised by World Triathlon. The competition has been held annually since 1998. The championships is a continually timed race containing a swim stage and either one or two run stages. Typically, the race consists of run—swim—run segments. When the water is less 22 degrees Celsius, a wetsuit is required and the race starts with the swim stage, followed by a single run stage, so that participants do not have to put on a wetsuit mid race. The total run distance is around 5 km and the swim is between 750m and 1 km. However the distances have varied during the event's history depending on local circumstances.

== Venues ==
Year	Date	Location	Distances (kilometers)		
Year	Date	Location	First Run	Swim	Second Run
1998	8 November	Noosa, Australia	2,5	1	2,5
1999	31 August	Noosa, Australia	2,5	1	2,5
2000	28 October	Cancún, Mexico	2,5	1	2,5
2001	18 July	Edmonton, Canada	2	0,75	2
2002	3 November	Cancún, Mexico	2,5	1	2,5
2003	December	Queenstown, New Zealand	2,5	1	2,5
2004	5 May	Madeira, Portugal	2,5	1	2,5
2005	8 September	Gamagōri, Japan	3,2	1	1,6
2006	30 August	Lausanne, Switzerland	-	1	4
2007	12 May	Ixtapa, Mexico	2,5	1	2,5
2008	28 June	Monterrey, Mexico	2,5	1	2,5
2009	9 September	Gold Coast, Australia	2,5	1	2,5
2010	8 September	Budapest, Hungary	2,5	1	2,5
2011	7 September	Beijing, China	2,5	1	2,5
2012	7 October	Auckland, New Zealand	2,5	1	2,5
2013	11 September	(United Kingdom) London, UK	2,5	1	2,5
2014	27 August	Edmonton, Canada	2,5	1	2,5
2015	16 September	(United States) Chicago, USA	-	1	5
2016	14 September	Cozumel, Mexico	2,5	1	2,5
2017	25 August	Penticton, Canada	2,5	1	2,5
2019	2 May	Pontevedra, Spain	–	1	5
2021	30–31 October	Extremadura, Spain	2,5	1	2,5
2022	18 August	Šamorín, Slovakia	2,5	1	2,5
2023	1 May	Santa Eulària, Spain		1	5
2024	23 August	Townsville, Australia	2,5	1	2,5
2025	27 June	Pontevedra, Spain	2,5	1	2,5
2026	20 November	Abu Dhabi, United Arab Emirates	2,7	1	2,6

== Champions ==
=== Men's ===
Year	Gold	Silver	Bronze
1998	Shane Reed (NZL)	Benjamin Sanson (FRA)	Craig Alexander (AUS)
1999	Shane Reed (NZL)	Paul Amey (NZL)	Levi Maxwell (AUS)
2000	Matt Reed (NZL)	Brad Kahlefeldt (AUS)	Paulo Miyasiro (BRA)
2001	Iván Raña (ESP)	Richard Stannard (GBR)	Filip Ospalý (CZE)
2002	Kris Gemmell (NZL)	Andriy Glushchenko (UKR)	Filip Ospalý (CZE)
2003	Richard Stannard (GBR)	Brent Foster (NZL)	Paulo Miyasiro (BRA)
2004	Shane Reed (NZL)	Csaba Kuttor (HUN)	Kris Gemmell (NZL)
2005	Tim Don (GBR)	Richard Stannard (GBR)	Paulo Miyasiro (BRA)
2006	Richard Stannard (GBR)	Daniel Lee (HKG)	Clark Ellice (NZL)
2007	Sergio Sarmiento (MEX)	Antônio Mansur (BRA)	Eder Mejía (MEX)
2008	Brent Foster (NZL)	Antônio Mansur (BRA)	Crisanto Grajales (MEX)
2009	Antônio Mansur (BRA)	Wesley Matos (BRA)	Adam Carlton (AUS)
2010	Richard Varga (SVK)	Daniel Halksworth (GBR)	Attila Fecskovics (HUN)
2011	Richard Stannard (GBR)	Ran Alterman (ISR)	Leandro Barbosa (BRA)
2012	Richard Varga (SVK)	Richard Stannard (GBR)	Ognjen Stojanović (SRB)
2013	Richard Varga (SVK)	Ivan Ivanov (UKR)	Csaba Rendes (HUN)
2014	Yuichi Hosoda (JPN)	Ryosuke Yamamoto (JPN)	Yegor Martynenko (UKR)
2015	Richard Varga (SVK)	Igor Polyanski (RUS)	Matt McElroy (USA)
2016	Alistair Brownlee (GBR)	Richard Varga (SVK)	Tommy Zaferes (USA)
2017	Matthew Sharpe (CAN)	John Rasmussen (CAN)	Aiden Longcroft-Harris (CAN)
2018	Emmanuel Lejeune (BEL)	Nathan Breen (AUS)	Alexis Kardes (FRA)
2019	Rostyslav Pevtsov (AZE)	Kevin Viñuela (ESP)	Dmitry Polyanski (RUS)
2021	David Castro (ESP)	Richard Varga (SVK)	Ander Noain (ESP)
2022	Márk Dévay (HUN)	Kevin Viñuela (ESP)	Márton Kropkó (HUN)
2023	Cristian Fernández (ESP)	Christopher Perham (GBR)	Jimmy Lund (GBR)
2024	Kevin Viñuela (ESP)	Luke Bate (AUS)	Cristian Fernández (ESP)
2025	Márton Kropkó (HUN)	Damián Suárez (ESP)	Christopher Perham (GBR)
2026	Christopher Perham (GBR)	Kevin Viñuela (ESP)	Damián Suárez (ESP)

=== Women's ===
Year	Gold	Silver	Bronze
1998	Rina Hill (AUS)	Nicole Hackett (AUS)	Melanie Mitchell (AUS)
1999	Rina Hill (AUS)	Nicole Hackett (AUS)	Michelle Dillon (GBR)
2000	Pilar Hidalgo (ESP)	Ana Burgos (ESP)	Pip Taylor (AUS)
2001	Siri Lindley (USA)	Rina Hill (NZL)	Sheila Taormina (USA)
2002	Sandra Soldan (BRA)	Jill Savege (CAN)	Lenka Radová (CZE)
2003	Carla Moreno (BRA)	Elizabeth May (LUX)	Anna Cleaver (NZL)
2004	Samantha Warriner (NZL)	Elizabeth May (LUX)	Charlotte Bonin (ITA)
2005	Sheila Taormina (USA)	Carla Moreno (BRA)	Lenka Radová (CZE)
2006	Sara McLarty (USA)	Eslpeth McGregor (CAN)	Maria Barrett (GBR)
2007	Sarah Groff (USA)	Kelly Cook (USA)	Ayesha Rollinson (CAN)
2008	Claudia Rivas (MEX)	Melody Ramírez (MEX)	Dunia Gómez (MEX)
2009	Samantha Warriner (NZL)	Maxine Seear (AUS)	Lisa Mensink (NED)
2010	Margit Vanek (HUN)	Szandra Szalay (HUN)	Gaia Peron (ITA)
2011	Elizabeth May (LUX)	Jessica Souza Santos (BRA)	
2012	Nicky Samuels (NZL)	Emma Davis (IRL)	Tea Miloš (CRO)
2013	Irina Abysova (RUS)	Claire Michel (BEL)	Yuliya Yelistratova (UKR)
2014	Anneke Jenkins (NZL)	Yuliya Yelistratova (UKR)	Hannah Kitchen (GBR)
2015	Anastasia Abrosimova (RUS)	Elena Danilova (RUS)	Long Hoi (MAC)
2016	Mariya Shorets (RUS)	Anastasia Abrosimova (RUS)	Valentina Zapatrina (RUS)
2017	Emma Pallant (GBR)	Delia Sclabas (SUI)	Jacqueline Slack (GBR)
2018	Edda Hannesdóttir (ISL)	Hannah Kitchen (GBR)	Vida Medić (SRB)
2019	Alicja Ulatowska (POL)	Zsanett Bragmayer (HUN)	Itzel Arroyo (MEX)
2021	Margot Garabedian (FRA)	Sara Pérez (ESP)	Margaréta Vráblová (SVK)
2022	Céline Kaiser (GER)	Márta Kropkó (HUN)	Maryna Kyryk (UKR)
2023	Zsanett Bragmayer (HUN)	Margaréta Vráblová (SVK)	Céline Kaiser (GER)
2024	Maryna Kyryk (UKR)	Claire Spicknall (AUS)	Kiara Mooney (AUS)
2025	Hanna Maksimava (AIN)	Marina Muñoz (ESP)	Jázmin Kropkó (HUN)
2026	Valentina Riasova (RUS)	Margot Garabedian (CAM)	Iana Chenskaia (RUS)
