= Triathlon at the 2015 European Games – Women's individual =

Women's individual at the 2015 European Games
- Venue: Bilgah Beach
- Date: 13 June
- Competitors: 48 from 30 nations

Medalists
gold medal	Nicola Spirig	Switzerland
silver medal	Rachel Klamer	Netherlands
bronze medal	Lisa Nordén	Sweden

The women's triathlon was part of the Triathlon at the 2015 European Games program, was held in Bilgah Beach Triathlon Venue on June 14, 2015.

The race was held over the "international distance" and consisted of 1,500 metres (0.93 mi) swimming, 40 kilometres (25 mi) road bicycle racing, and 9.945 kilometres (6.180 mi) road running.

== Schedule ==
All times are Azerbaijan Standard Time (UTC+04:00)

Date	Time	Event
Saturday, 13 June 2015	12:30	Final

== Results ==
Legend

- DNF – did not finish
- LAP – lapped
- DNS – did not start

Rank	Athlete	Swim 1.5 km	Trans. 1	Bike 40 km	Trans. 2	Run 9.945 km	Total time
1st place, gold medalist(s)	Nicola Spirig (SUI)	20:50	0:48	1:03:37	0:27	34:46	2:00:28
2nd place, silver medalist(s)	Rachel Klamer (NED)	20:16	0:53	1:04:06	0:34	35:55	2:01:44
3rd place, bronze medalist(s)	Lisa Nordén (SWE)	20:37	0:49	1:03:49	0:29	36:02	2:01:46
4	Yuliya Yelistratova (UKR)	21:35	0:50	1:05:28	0:32	34:46	2:03:11
5	Tamara Gómez Garrido (ESP)	21:55	0:48	1:05:11	0:26	35:07	2:03:27
6	Aileen Reid (IRL)	20:46	0:47	1:06:19	0:29	35:37	2:03:58
7	Alexandra Razarenova (RUS)	22:05	0:51	1:05:02	0:25	35:37	2:04:00
8	Claire Michel (BEL)	21:51	0:48	1:05:21	0:29	35:41	2:04:10
9	Agnieszka Jerzyk (POL)	22:02	0:49	1:05:01	0:26	36:09	2:04:27
10	Maria Cześnik (POL)	21:52	0:57	1:05:05	0:32	36:07	2:04:33
11	Margot Garabedian (FRA)	20:39	0:49	1:06:30	0:28	36:15	2:04:41
12	Maaike Caelers (NED)	22:02	0:47	1:05:03	0:26	36:28	2:04:46
13	Miriam Casillas Garcia (ESP)	22:03	0:48	1:05:03	0:27	36:28	2:04:49
14	Elena Danilova (RUS)	21:54	0:51	1:05:10	0:31	36:54	2:05:20
15	Heather Sellars (GBR)	21:56	0:49	1:05:12	0:29	37:01	2:05:27
16	Anastasia Abrosimova (RUS)	20:16	0:53	1:06:50	0:28	37:20	2:05:47
17	Kseniia Levkovska (AZE)	21:36	0:54	1:05:25	0:30	37:22	2:05:47
18	Paulina Kotfica (POL)	21:33	0:51	1:05:34	0:31	37:19	2:05:48
19	Inna Ryzhykh (UKR)	20:43	0:49	1:06:25	0:28	38:09	2:06:34
20	Lotte Miller (NOR)	21:47	0:49	1:05:20	0:32	38:11	2:06:39
21	Petra Kuříková (CZE)	20:44	0:48	1:06:26	0:27	38:30	2:06:55
22	Sofie Hooghe (BEL)	21:52	0:53	1:05:10	0:31	39:00	2:07:26
23	Lisa Sieburger (GER)	22:09	0:47	1:08:09	0:27	36:03	2:07:35
24	Charlotte Deldaele (BEL)	20:43	0:48	1:06:21	0:23	39:27	2:07:42
25	Melanie Santos (POR)	20:45	0:49	1:06:23	0:28	39:46	2:08:11
26	Olesandra Stepanenko (UKR)	21:35	0:52	1:05:31	0:30	40:05	2:08:33
27	Elena Maria Petrini (ITA)	20:43	0:51	1:06:22	0:27	40:16	2:08:39
28	Kaidi Kivioja (EST)	23:15	0:48	1:07:02	0:27	37:23	2:08:55
29	Alessia Orla (ITA)	20:40	0:53	1:06:20	0:28	41:41	2:10:02
30	Jitka Šimáková (CZE)	22:02	0:52	1:08:13	0:31	38:43	2:10:21
31	Zsanett Horváth (HUN)	20:39	0:49	1:06:31	0:29	42:11	2:10:39
32	Eva Skaza (SLO)	20:45	0:55	1:06:17	0:33	43:57	2:12:27
33	Romana Gajdošová (SVK)	23:16	0:50	1:10:31	0:28	39:39	2:14:44
34	Sonja Škevin (CRO)	21:58	0:56	1:08:15	0:33	44:02	2:15:44
35	Ivana Kuriačková (SVK)	23:12	0:55	1:10:29	0:29	41:13	2:16:18
36	Antoanela Manac (ROU)	22:08	0:54	1:11:35	0:31	44:06	2:19:14
37	Danica Bonello Spiteri (MLT)	23:24	0:49	1:10:24	0:40	44:10	2:19:27
38	Avital Gez (ISR)	22:08	0:50	1:08:12	0:29	48:41	2:20:20
—	Leonie Periault (FRA)	21:15	0:51	1:05:53	0:29		DNF
—	Ece Bakıcı (TUR)	23:19	0:49	1:10:28	0:31		DNF
—	Theresa Moser (AUT)	22:12	0:54				LAP
—	Dóra Mester (HUN)	23:19	0:53				LAP
—	Hrista Stoyneva (BUL)	23:23	0:53				LAP
—	Ana Ramos (POR)	23:10	0:58				LAP
—	İpek Öztosun (TUR)	24:14	0:54				LAP
—	Deniz Dimaki (GRE)	25:10	0:59				LAP
—	Hannah Pace (MLT)						DNF
—	Kaisa Lehtonen (FIN)						DNS
