= Shane Reed =

New Zealand triathlete (1973–2022)

Personal information
- Nickname: Snuffie
- Born: Shane Robert Reed; 16 June 1973 Palmerston North, New Zealand
- Died: 30 October 2022 (aged 49)
- Height: 1.85 m (6 ft 1 in)
- Weight: 70 kg (154 lb)
- Relative: Matt Reed (brother)

Sport
- Country: New Zealand
- Sport: Aquathlon; Triathlon
- Coached by: Brendon Downey

Achievements and titles
- Personal bests: Swim (1500 m) – 15:59; Cycle (40 km) – 53:37; Run (10 km) – 29:50
Medal record
Men's aquathlon
Representing New Zealand
ITU Aquathlon World Championships
Gold medal – first place	1998 Noosa	Elite
Gold medal – first place	1999 Noosa	Elite
Gold medal – first place	2004 Madeira	Elite

Shane Robert Reed (16 June 1973 – 30 October 2022) was a New Zealand aquathlete and triathlete. He won three titles at the ITU Aquathlon World Championships. During his sporting career, he took part in over 65 ITU competitions, winning five medals and achieving thirty-one top ten finishes.

== Early life ==
Reed was born in Palmerston North, North Island, on 16 June 1973. His father was a painter, while his mother worked as a head nurse. The family relocated to Australia when Reed was eight years old. He studied graphic and design in university, but dropped out to pursue triathlon before he could complete his bachelor's degree.

== Career ==
Reed competed in his first triathlon when he was 21. He finished in seventh place at the 2004 ITU World Triathlon Championships in Madeira, Portugal. He was also eleventh at the 2005 ITU World Triathlon Championships in Gamagori, Japan. Reed was the gold medallist at the 1998, 1999, and 2004 editions of the ITU Aquathlon World Championships.

Reed was selected for the New Zealand Olympic team in the men's triathlon. He qualified for the country's third and final spot at the 2008 Summer Olympics in Beijing by winning the Oceania championships triathlon title in March of that same year. His teammates at the Games were Kris Gemmell and Bevan Docherty, who later won the silver medal in this event. Reed's brother Matt, however, became an American citizen just a year before the Olympics and was competing for the United States. In the men's triathlon, Reed led the field out of the swim leg, and ran strongly within the whole course. He expected to reach a top ten finish with his teammates, but he was not able to maintain his pace after being exhausted from riding the bike. Adding to his frustration at not being able to run his own race, Reed was narrowly beaten by his brother Matt, who finished strongly in thirty-second place. In the end, he crossed the finish line by just two places behind his brother, with the time of 1:52:48.

== Military career ==
In 2012 Reed enlisted in the Royal New Zealand Air Force as a safety and surface technician.

== Personal life ==
Reed married Tammy Kendall, a fellow triathlete from New Plymouth, in October 2005. They met in Hawaii, and remained married until his death. Together, they had two children. They resided in Palmerston North, where Reed was head coach at the Kiwi West Aquatics from July 2021 until his death. He was noted for being a gifted cartoonist and illustrated cartoons for triathlon magazines during his early years in the sport.

Reed died on 30 October 2022. He was 49, and was diagnosed with brain cancer six months prior to his death.
