= Lisa Perterer =

Austrian triathlete

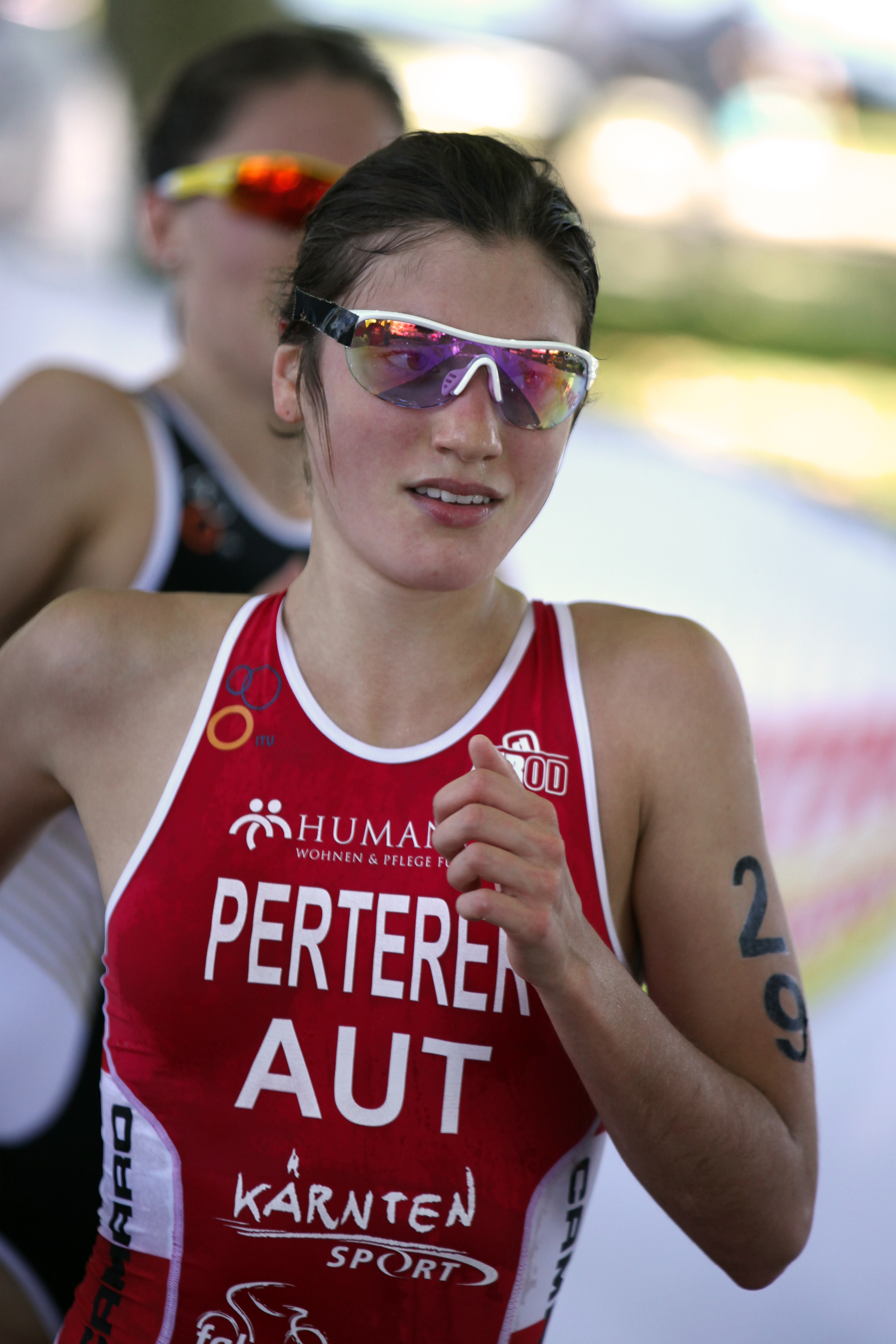
Lisa Perterer at the Elite Sprint World Championships in Lausanne, 2011.

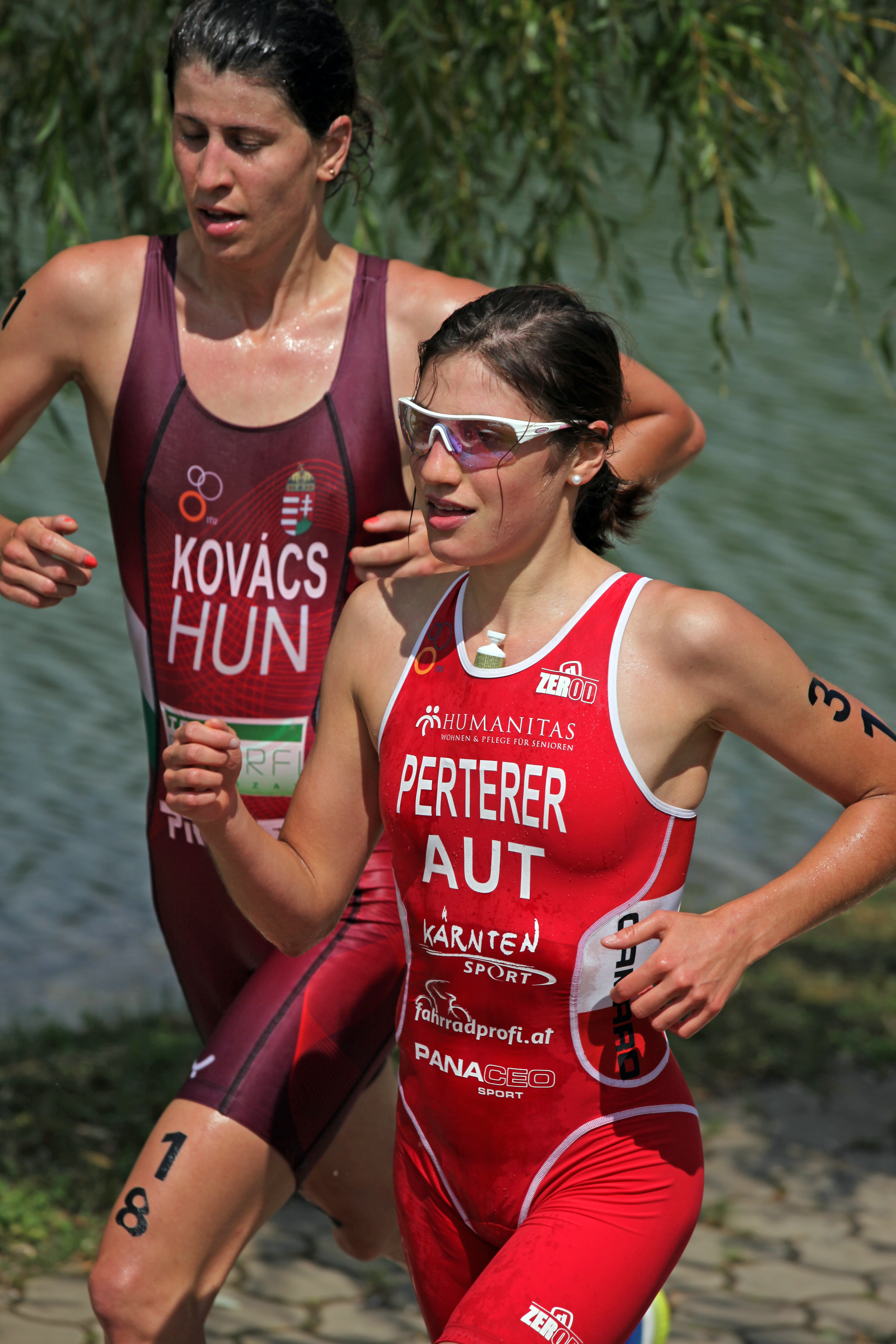
Lisa Perterer, duelling with the best Hungarian triathlete Zsófia Kovács at the World Cup in Tiszaújváros, 2011.

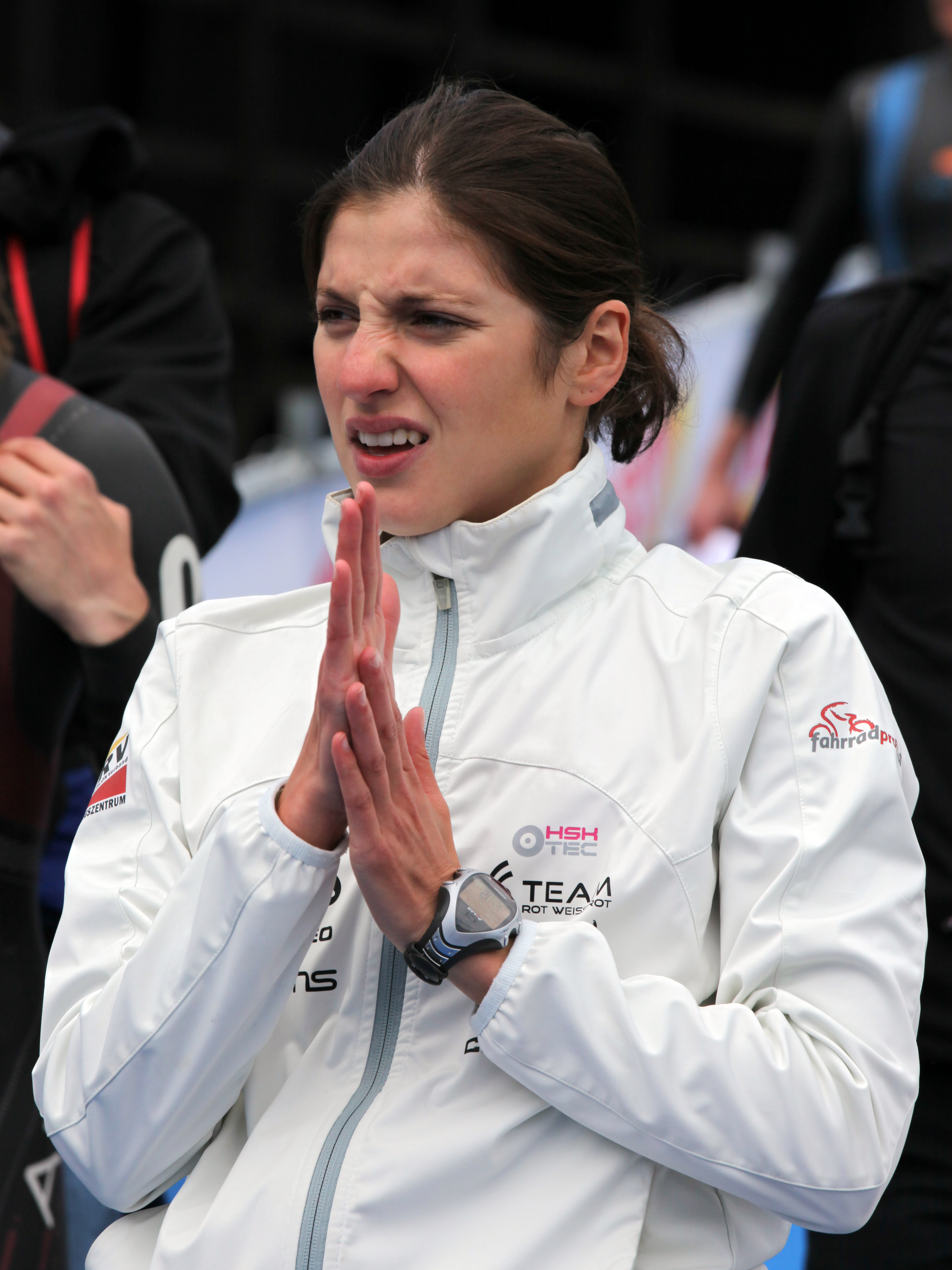
Lisa Perterer at the World Championship Series triathlon in Kitzbuhel, 2011.

Lisa Perterer (born 16 October 1991 in Villach) is an Austrian professional triathlete, winner of the 2009 Junior European Cup circuit and Austrian Junior Champion 2010. At the 2012 Summer Olympics, she finished in 48th in the individual event. In 2021, she competed in the women's event at the 2020 Summer Olympics held in Tokyo, Japan, finishing 27th. She was also scheduled to compete in the mixed relay event but the Austrian team did not start.

== Career ==
In 2011, Perterer changed to the Elite category. At the World Championship Series triathlon in Kitzbuhel, she was included into the start list only thanks to a wildcard. At the World Cup triathlon in Edmonton, however, still a junior, she most surprisingly won the bronze medal behind Ashleigh Gentle and Mateja Simic and thus proved to be the best Austrian female triathlete, far better than Lydia Waldmüller, who placed 21st. Thanks to the bronze medal, Lisa Perterer was regularly qualified for the World Championship Series triathlon in Hamburg where she placed 15th and again proved to belong the world elite. At Tiszaújváros she again achieved a good position among the world elite.

Lisa Perterer attended the Sports High School BORG SSLK in Klagenfurt and represents the army club HSV (Heeressportverein) Triathlon Kärnten. In autumn 2011, Perterer joined the sports high performance scheme of the Austrian army.

== ITU competitions ==
In the four years from 2007 to 2010, Perterer took part in 11 ITU competitions and achieved 9 top ten positions. The following list is based upon the official ITU rankings and the Athlete's Profile Page. Unless indicated otherwise, the following events are triathlons (Olympic Distance) and belong to the Elite category.

Date	Competition	Place	Rank
2007-09-08	Junior European Cup	Bled	1
2008-02-01	Winter Triathlon European Championship (Junior)	Gaishorn am See	1
2008-06-28	Junior European Cup	Holten	5
2009-02-13	Winter Triathlon European Championship (Junior)	Gaishorn	3
2009-06-06	Junior European Cup	Vienna	1
2009-06-20	Junior European Cup	Tarzo Revine	2
2009-07-02	European Championship (Junior)	Holten	6
2009-09-09	Dextro Energy World Championship Series, Grand Final: Junior World Championship	Gold Coast	27
2010-06-12	Junior European Cup	Vienna	6
2010-07-03	European Championship (Junior)	Athlone	8
2010-09-08	Dextro Energy World Championship Series, Grand Final: Junior World Championship	Budapest	17
2011-05-29	Premium European Cup	Brasschaat	18
2011-06-18	Dextro Energy World Championship Series	Kitzbühel	56
2011-07-10	World Cup	Edmonton	3
2011-07-16	Dextro Energy World Championship Series	Hamburg	15
2011-08-14	World Cup	Tiszaújváros	13
2011-08-20	Sprint World Championship	Lausanne	29
2011-09-09	Dextro Energy World Championship Series	Beijing	54
2011-10-09	World Cup	Huatulco	DNF
2011-11-06	World Cup	Guatape	7
