= Nicky Samuels =

New Zealand triathlete

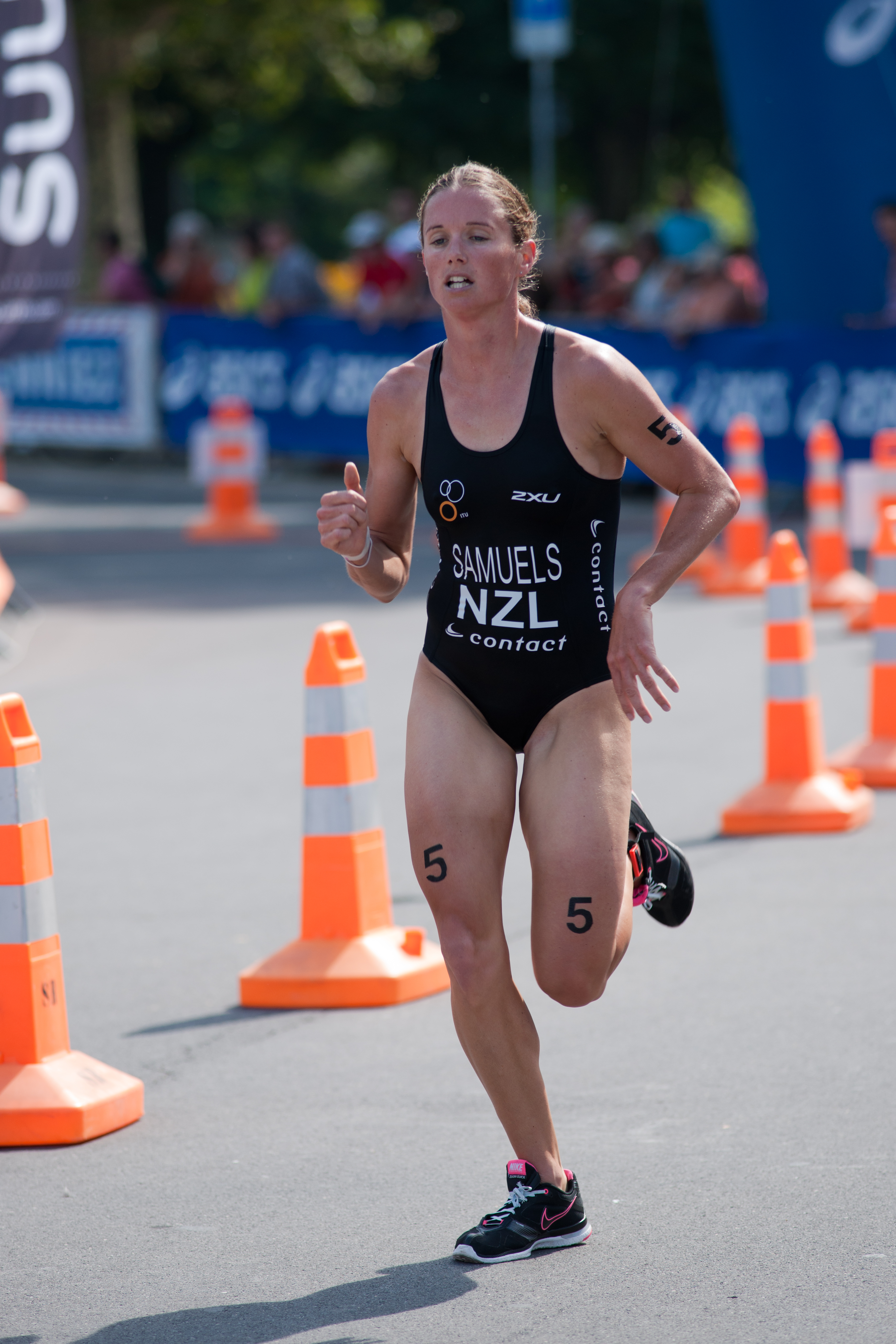
- 2010 ITU Sprint Distance Triathlon World Championships, Lausanne, Switzerland

Personal information
- Born: 28 February 1983 (age 43) Whangarei, New Zealand
- Height: 170 cm (67 in)
- Weight: 55 kg (121 lb)
- Other interests: Cooking, reading, beach and sunshine, outdoor adventures.

Sport
- Country: New Zealand
- Club: TCG 79 Parthenay pro team in France
- Team: Triathlon New Zealand elite squad.
- Coached by: Mark Elliott
Medal record
Women's triathlon
Representing New Zealand
XTERRA Triathlon World Championships
Gold medal – first place	2013	Elite
ITU Aquathlon World Championships
Gold medal – first place	2012	Elite

Nicky Samuels (born 28 February 1983) is a New Zealand professional triathlete who has won the 2013 XTERRA Triathlon World Championship and the 2012 ITU Aquathlon World Championships. She is also the 2012 New Zealand cycling road race national champion. She represented—alongside Andrea Hewitt—New Zealand at the 2016 Summer Olympics in triathlon and came 13th.

== Professional career ==
=== Achievements ===
- 2016 Olympic Games, Rio de Janeiro, Brazil 13th individual race
- 2014 Commonwealth Games, Glasgow, Scotland. 5th team race
- 2014 Commonwealth Games, Glasgow, Scotland. 10th individual race
- 2014 Xterra World Championships Maui, Hawaii. 3rd
- 2014 ITU Triathlon World Series Grand Final Edmonton, Canada. 3rd
- 2014 ITU Triathlon World Series Stockholm, Sweden. 3rd
- 2014 ITU Triathlon World Series London, Great Britain. 5th
- 2014 OTU Sprint triathlon Oceania cup, New Zealand. 1st
- 2013 Xterra World Championships Maui, Hawaii. 1st
- 2013 ITU Triathlon World Series Kitzbuehel, Austria. 5th
- 2013 ITU Triathlon World Series Auckland, New Zealand. 5th
- 2012 ITU Triathlon World cup Tongyeong, Korea. 1st
- 2012 ITU Triathlon World Series Kitzbuehel, Austria. 6th
- 2012 Olympic Games, London, Great Britain. 33rd individual race
- 2012 ITU Aquathlon World Championship. 1st
- 2012 New Zealand Road Race cycling Champion
- 2010 Bronze Oceania Championships, Wellington NZ
- 2010, 2009, 2008 New Zealand Triathlon Series Champion (Contact Cup)
- 2010 NZ National Sprint distance Champion
- 2009 NZ National Sprint distance Champion
- 2009 Central Otago Sports Women of the year
- 2009 Bronze Oceania Champs, Gold Coast Australia
- 2009 Silver Medal Oceania Cup, New Plymouth, New Zealand
- 2009 4th Place ITU World Cup Mooloolaba Australia
- 2008 Bronze Oceania Champs, Wellington NZ
- 2008 NZ Olympic Distance National Champion
- 2007 4th place Madrid ITU World Cup, Spain
- 2007 Bronze ITU World Cup Kitzbuhel, Austria
- 2006 Bronze U23 Elite World Championships, Lausanne, Switzerland
