= Mariya Shorets =

Russian triathlete

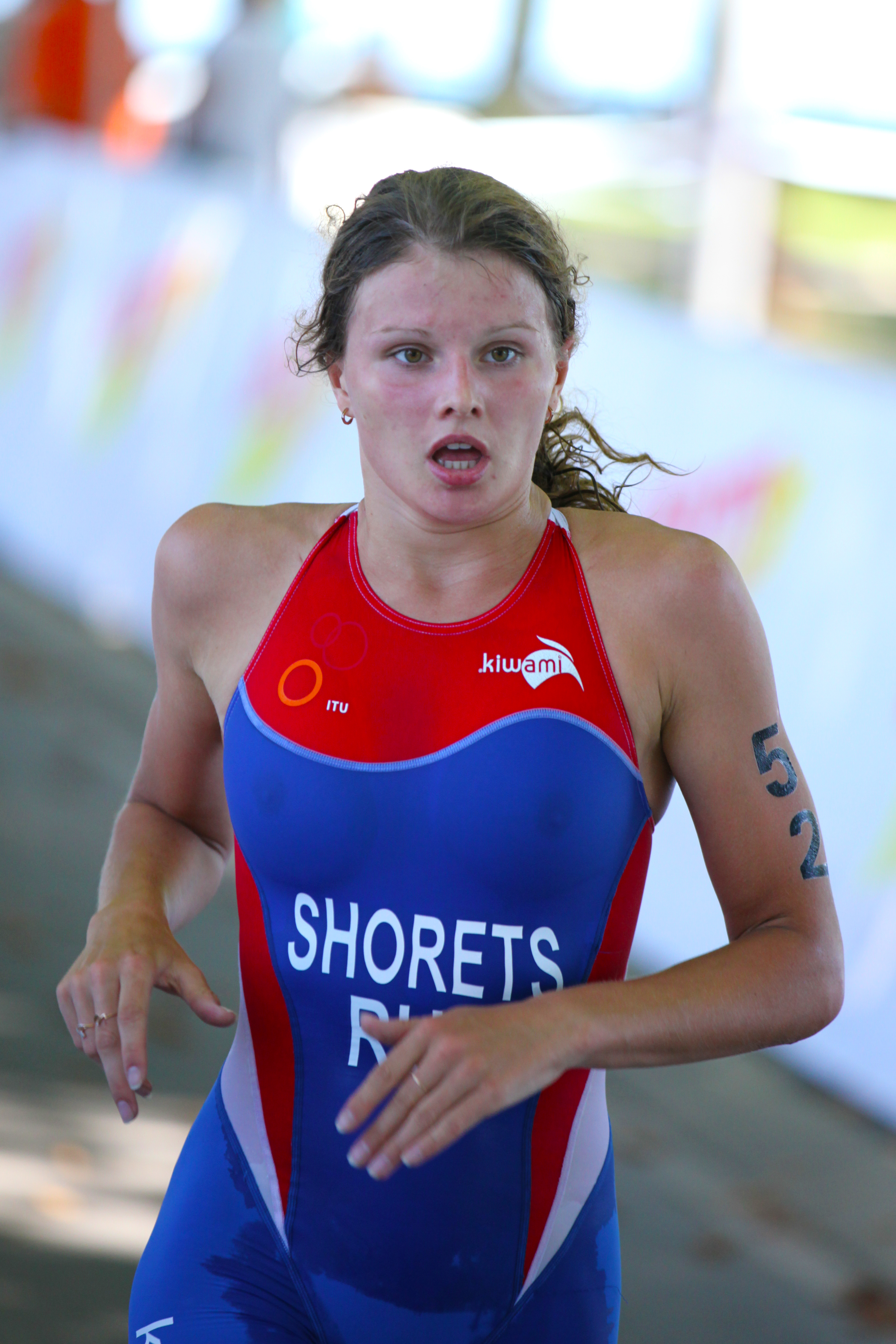
- Mariya Shorets at the Sprint World Championships in Lausanne, 2011.

Personal information
- Nationality: Russian
- Born: Mariya Sergeyevna Shorets; 9 August 1990 (age 35) Saint Petersburg, Russia

Sport
- Country: Russia
- Sport: Triathlon
Medal record
Representing Russia
Women's aquathlon
World Championships
Gold medal – first place	2016 Cozumel	Individual

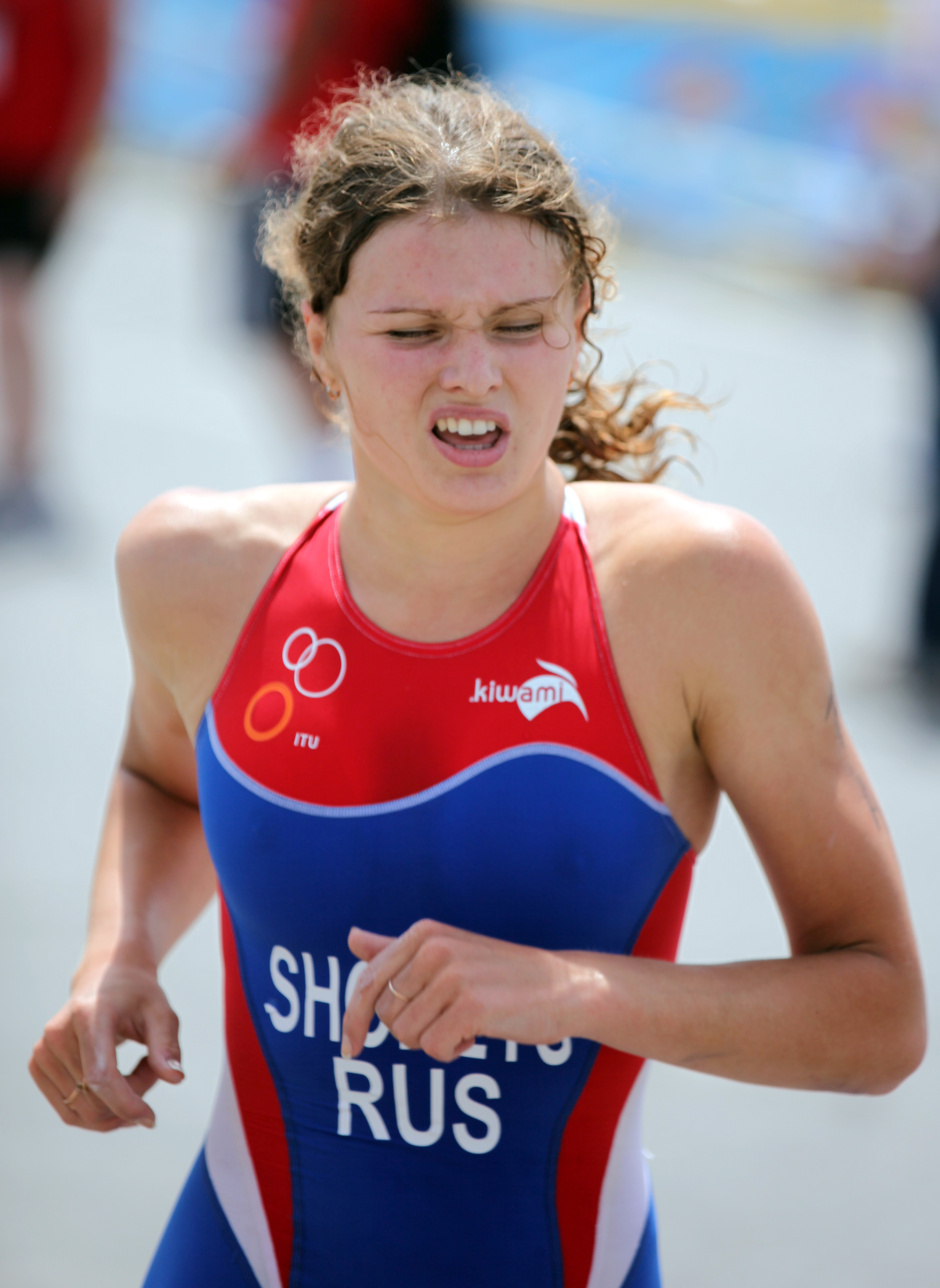
Mariya Shorets at the European Championships in Pontevedra, 2011.

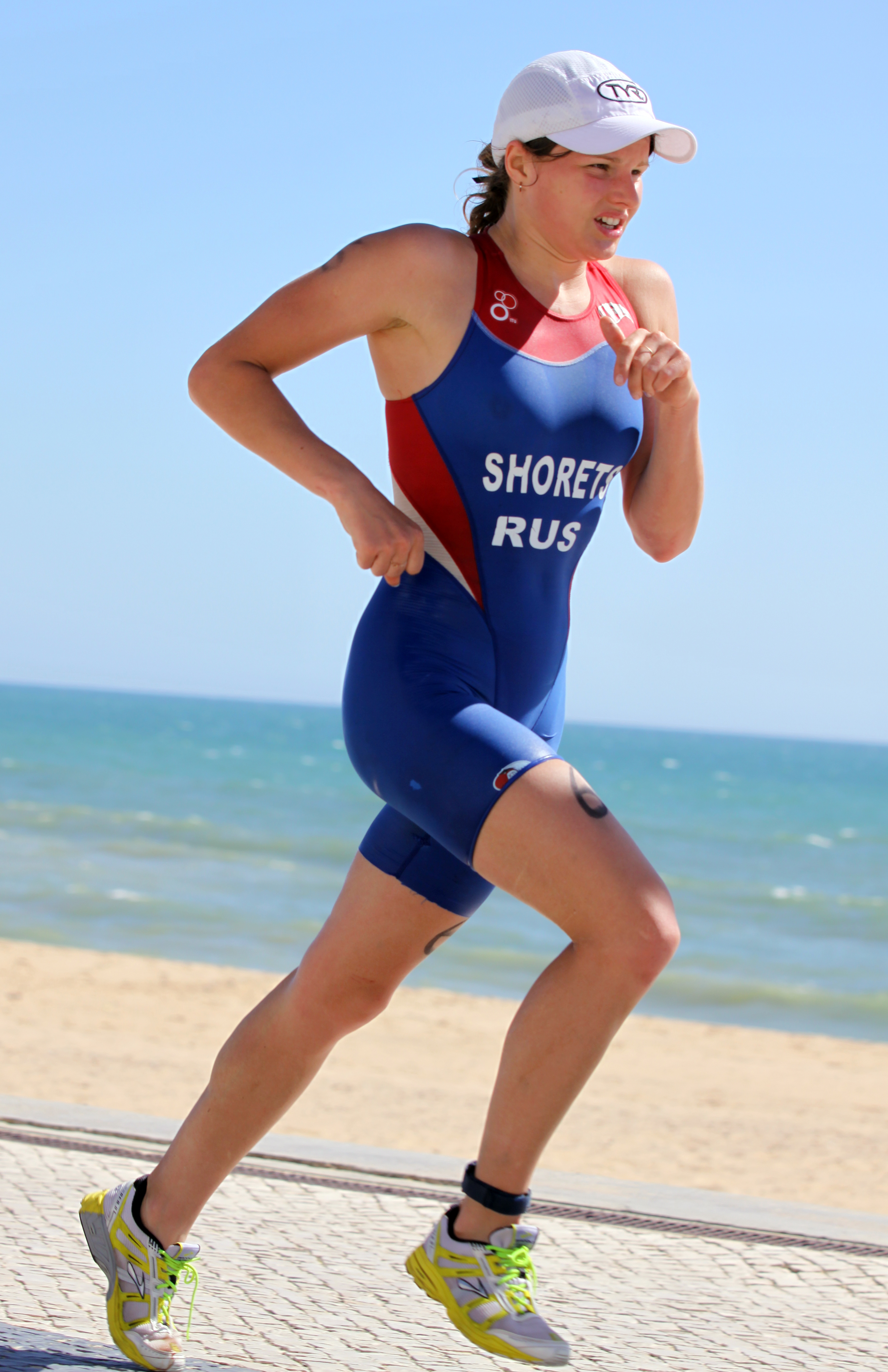
Mariya Shorets at the European Cup triathlon in Quarteira, 2011.

Mariya Sergeyevna Shorets (Russian Мария Сергеевна Шорец, born 9 August 1990, in Saint Petersburg) is a Russian professional triathlete and the 2016 World Aquathlon Champion. Russian U23 Champion of the year 2011, bronze medalist in the Elite ranking, and a member of the National Team.

On 30 December 2010, the title Master of Sports (International Class) (Мастер срорта России международного класса) was conferred upon two Saint Petersburg based triathletes, Shorets and Olga Dmitrieva.

In 2010, Shorets represented the club Triathlon SC Riederau in the German circuit Bundesliga.

In 2011, Shorets is also a member of the French elite club TOCC (Triathlon Olympique Club Cessonais), like many other foreign guest stars (e.g. Zsófia Kovács, Zsófia Tóth, Aileen Morrison and Non Stanford) and could take part in the prestigious French Club Championship Series Lyonnaise des Eaux. At the two first triathlons of the 2011 circuit, however, Shorets was not among the five triathletes nominated by TOCC.

Like Natalia Shliakhtenko, Mariya Shorets lives in Saint Petersburg, attends a High Performance Sports School for future Olympians (Государственное образовательное учреждение среднего профессионального образования "Санкт-Петербургское училище олимпийского резерва № 1", г. Санкт-Петербург) and represents the club or rather nationwide sports association Dynamo (Динамо).

== ITU Competitions ==
In the five years from 2006 to 2010, Shorets took part in 13 ITU competitions and achieved 9 top ten positions. The following list is based upon the official ITU rankings and the ITU Athletes's Profile Page. Unless indicated otherwise, the following events are triathlons (Olympic Distance) and refer to the Elite category.

Date	Competition	Place	Rank
2006-10-18	Junior European Cup	Alanya	4
2007-10-24	Junior European Cup	Alanya	2
2008-05-10	European Championships (Junior)	Lisbon	5
2008-06-05	World Championships (Junior)	Vancouver	33
2008-06-28	Junior European Cup	Holten	8
2008-09-06	Junior European Cup	Pulpí	3
2008-09-27	Duathlon World Championships (Junior)	Rimini	11
2008-10-26	Junior European Cup	Alanya	3
2009-08-08	Junior European Cup	Tiszaújváros	4
2009-10-25	Premium European Cup	Alanya	DNF
2010-04-11	European Cup	Quarteira	8
2010-08-28	European Championships (U23)	Vila Nova de Gaia (Porto)	13
2010-10-24	Premium European Cup	Alanya	4
2011-03-20	Pan American Cup	Santiago	5
2011-03-27	Pan American Cup	Valparaiso	2
2011-04-09	European Cup	Quarteira	16
2011-06-04	Dextro Energy World Championship Series	Madrid	43
2011-06-24	European Championships	Pontevedra	19
2011-06-26	European Championships (Elite Mix Relay)	Pontevedra	4
2011-07-03	European Cup	Penza	DNF
2011-08-14	World Cup	Tiszaújváros	6
2011-08-20	Sprint World Championships	Lausanne	27

DNF = did not finish · DNS = did not start

In 2016, at the Rio de Janeiro Olympic Games, Mariya Shorets finished 25th in the triathlon competition.

On 14 September 2016, in Cozumel, Mariya Shorets became a World Champion at ITU Aquathlon World Championships.

On 17 September 2016, in Cozumel, at the 2016 World Triathlon Championship Series Grand Final organized by the International Triathlon Union, Maria Shorets finished 9th.
