= Brent Foster =

New Zealand swimmer and triathlete

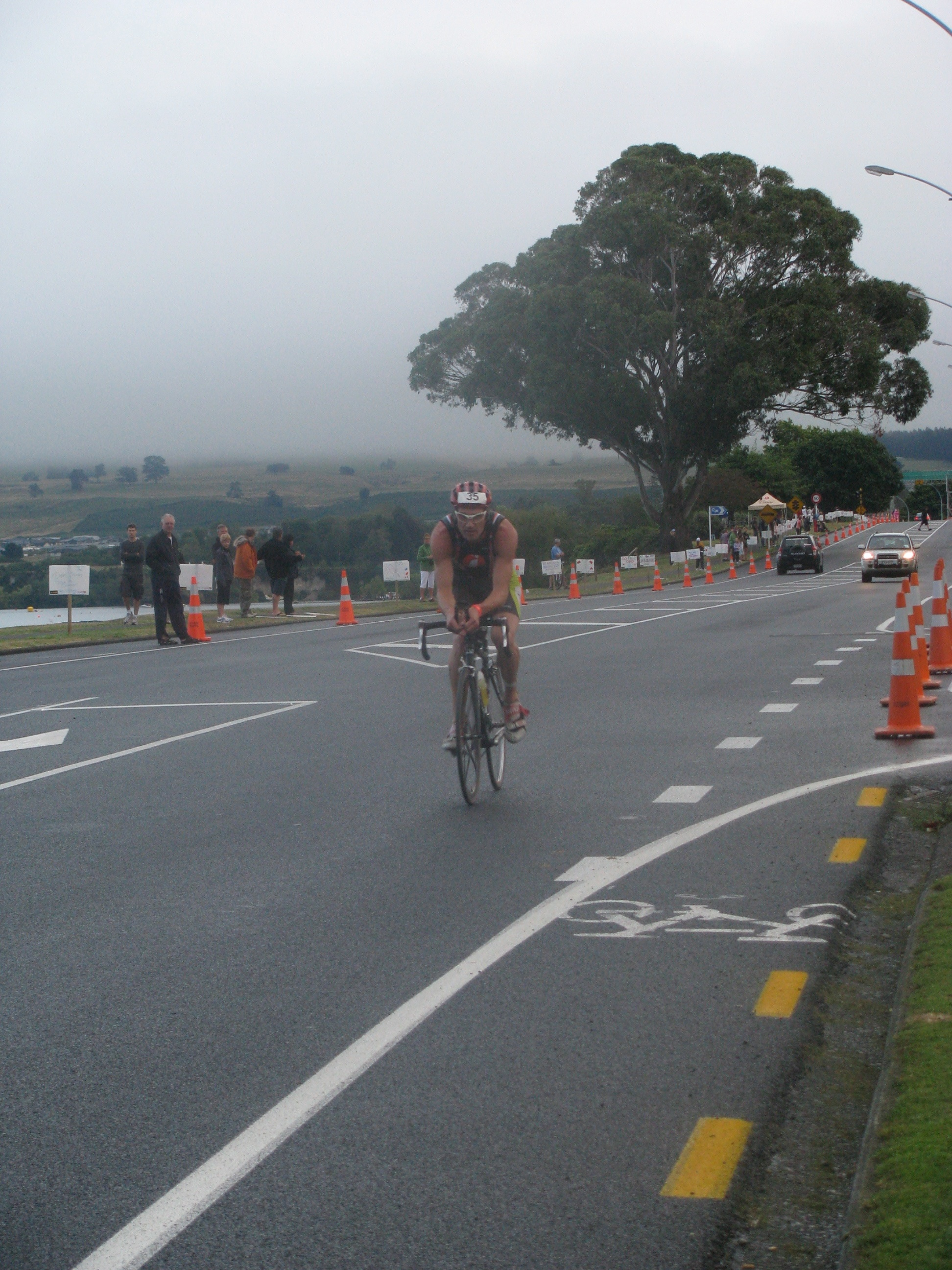
Brent Foster at Ironman New Zealand 2009

Brent Foster (born 23 May 1967) is an athlete from New Zealand. As a swimmer and triathlete he has taken part in surf lifesaving and Ironman competitions and represented his country at the Commonwealth Games.

He was a member of the world champion New Zealand team at the 1998 World Surf Lifesaving Championship, and has set the swim course record at the New Zealand Ironman. In 2008 Foster won the Elite Men category of the ITU Aquathlon World Championships in Monterrey, Mexico.

== Commonwealth Games ==
Foster competed at the Commonwealth Games in 1986 and 1990.

Year	City	Competition
1986	Edinburgh, Scotland	Swimming, Men's 200m Freestyle
1986	Edinburgh, Scotland	Swimming, Men's 200m Individual Medley
1986	Edinburgh, Scotland	Swimming, Men's 400m Freestyle
1986	Edinburgh, Scotland	Swimming, Men's 400m Individual Medley
1990	Auckland, New Zealand	Swimming, Men's 200m Individual Medley
1990	Auckland, New Zealand	Swimming, Men's 400m Individual Medley
