= Kris Gemmell =

New Zealand triathlete

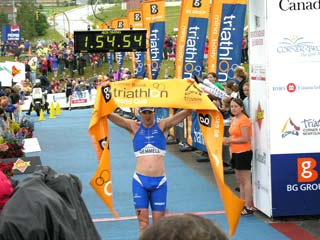
Gemmell wins 2006 Corner Brook Triathlon, Canada

Kris Andrew Gemmell (born 28 April 1977, in Palmerston North) is a New Zealand triathlete, and 2002 World Aquathon Champion in Cancún, Mexico. He has also competed in the 2002 and 2006 Commonwealth Games finishing 6th and 5th respectively.

Gemmell has been racing on the International Triathlon Union (ITU) World Cup circuit since 1998 and has had numerous wins and podium finishes.

== Career progression ==
When Kris moved from Palmerston North to Christchurch in the late 1990s to study at the University of Canterbury, he was an aspiring Rugby union player. However an injury led to a chain of events that resulted in Kris coming to the attention and under the guidance of Doctor John Hellemans. Hellemans is a well known multiple World Champion Triathlete and coach.

In 1997, Gemmell competed in the ITU junior World Championships in Perth Australia coming a 6th in a field that included future World Champion Ivan Rana. Kris' breakthrough race on the world stage in the senior ranks came in 2000 when he claimed 3rd place at the Tokyo round of the ITU World Cup.

Gemmell was selected for the 2002 Commonwealth Games in Manchester, England where he placed second for New Zealand and sixth in overall. Later that year, he became World Champion in the aquathon before later in the week backing it up with an 8th place at the Triathlon World Championships in Cancún Mexico.

Disappointment followed as Kris suffered some injuries and missed selection to the three-person New Zealand Olympic team for Athens in 2004. Nevertheless, the year ended on a high note with his first ITU World Cup victory in Gamagori, Japan.

2005 and 2006 saw more good results on the World stage and selection to his second Commonwealth Games this time in Melbourne Australia. After finishing 5th Kris had a series of 4th placings including at the World Championships in Lausanne Switzerland. Kris also won at Corner Brook Canada and his consistent year was rewarded with 5th place in the ITU points rankings for the year (2006).

In 2007, Gemmell had enjoyed another consistent season with three podiums and two fourth places. One of those fourths was at the Beijing round of the ITU World Cup and this result gained Kris a nomination for the New Zealand Triathlon team to race at the 2008 Summer Olympics in Beijing. At Beijing, he finished in 39th place. He qualified again for the 2012 Summer Olympics, and finished in 15th place.

== Cycling ==
Kris has also raced alongside professional cyclists in UCI sanctioned events such as the Tour of Southland and the Tour of Wellington. In 2007 Kris joined the Subway team for the Tour of Wellington as they both are sponsored by Avanti Bikes to kick start his season.

== In the media ==
Kris narrowly missed selection to the 2004 Olympics in Athens but was named as 'first reserve'. After training with other team members Hamish Carter and Bevan Docherty in France Kris was invited by TVNZ to give 'expert' comments on the men's and women's races. Carter and Docherty famously claimed the gold and silver medals and Gemmell was able to reassure broadcaster Brendon Telfer and the New Zealand Television audience that the Australian Greg Bennett would not catch the two New Zealanders.
