= Claire Michel =

Belgian triathlete (born 1988)

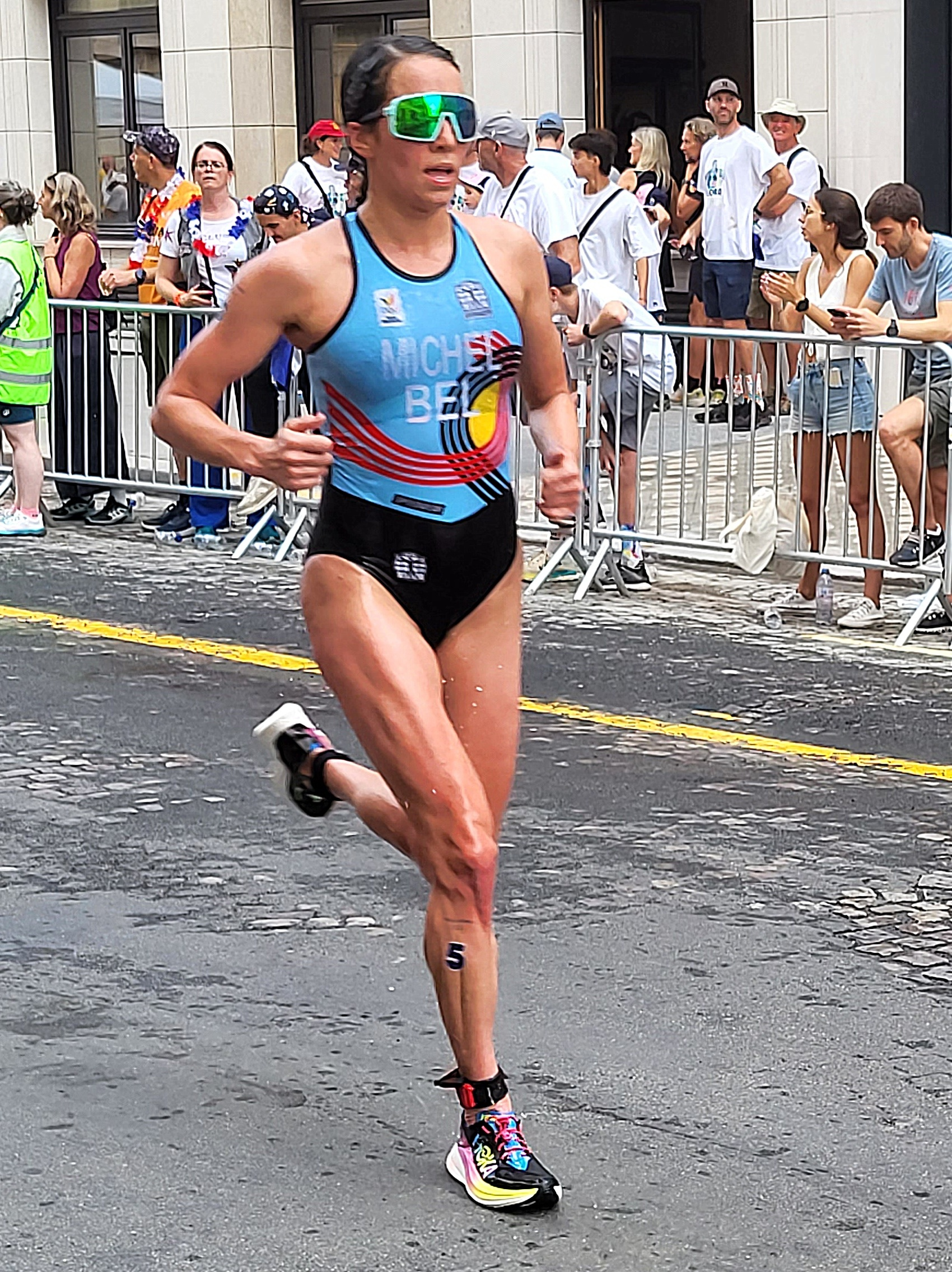
- Claire Michel in the triathlon at the 2024 Olympics in Paris

Personal information
- Nationality: Belgian, American
- Born: 13 October 1988 (age 38) Brussels, Belgium
- Education: University of Oregon, Solvay Business School
- Height: 168 cm (5 ft 6 in)
- Weight: 54 kg (119 lb)

Sport
- Country: Belgium
- Sport: Triathlon
- Club: Brussels Triathlon Club (BTC)
- Turned pro: 2015
Medal record
Representing Belgium
Women's Triathlon
European Championships
Bronze medal – third place	2018 Glasgow	Mixed relay
Women's Aquathlon
World Championships
Silver medal – second place	2013 London	Elite

Claire Michel (born 13 October 1988 in Brussels) is a Belgian professional triathlete. She is the 2013 Aquathlon vice-World Champion. She has been named Belgian Triathlon's Female Athlete of the Year twice, in 2014 and 2015, she's part of the National Team and represented Belgium at the 2016 Summer Olympics in Rio. She is also Belgian Champion on Sprint distance for 2016.

== Personal life ==
Michel was born in Brussels from Belgian parents: her mother, Colette Crabbé, represented Belgium in 1976 Montreal Olympic Games in swimming.

At the age of one year she moved to Oregon, where she obtained the Bachelor of Arts at University of Oregon in 2011. She then moved back to Belgium, where she worked at the American Chamber of Commerce in Brussels and she completed "Advanced Masters in Innovation and Strategic Management" in 2014 at the Solvay Business School.

She lives in Brussels where she is representing the Brussels Triathlon Club.

== Career ==
Michel started her sport career at 12 years, after reading about her mother competing in the Montreal Olympics, representing her high-school in swimming competitions. At 14, she also started competing in cross-country running and track and field, immediately becoming one of the top junior athletes in Oregon in both endeavors. She then joined the University of Oregon athletic team, thanks to a scholarship for her sport results. She set a 3,000 meter steeplechase school-record and got 8th place in the NCAA Championship in 2011. A stress fracture prevented her from qualifying for the 2012 London Olympic Games.

In 2012, she shifted to triathlon, and joined the Brussels Triathlon Club. She became Belgian Champion on the Sprint distance in 2012. In her second year of triathlon she competed in five ITU events, winning the silver medal at the ITU Aquathlon World Championships in London.

In 2014, while still finishing her post master at Solvay University, she competed in both World Triathlon Series and World Cup races: her best positions of the year were a 3rd place in Chengdu World Cup race, and a 6th place in Yokohama. She finished the year in 33rd position in the World Triathlon Series ranking, first female Belgian. During the conference Triathlon World she has been elected as female "Athlète de l'année 2014".

In 2015 Michel started competing as professional triathlete, with a 24th position in the second race of the 2015 World Cup in New Plymouth, 1'40" behind race winner Kaitlin Donner and with 4th place in the running section, just 6 seconds behind the winner. In the second race of the season she had a bike crash and she had to abandon the race; the same happened in the 3rd race of the season in Cape Town, and sprained foot ligaments forced Michel to miss the Far-East section of the World Cup and World Series, and drop out from the Olympic Qualification List for Rio.

Back to races after the injuries, she finished 17th in London, just a minute from race winner Gwen Jorgensen. A few weeks later she represented Belgium at the First European Games in Baku. Michel arrived 8th in the Women competition, a bit less than 4 minutes behind race winner Nicola Spirig. She was around the 30th position after T2, but thanks to the 6th split in the run fraction she overtook most of chase pack, finishing in the top 10. Unfortunately, slipping on a pool in Baku, she injured again the same foot and suffered a broken metatarsal, putting her out of competition for two months.

Returned to racing in August, Michel finished 4th in Riga Sprint ETU race, but problems with foot and difficult weather conditions didn't allow her to compete at top of her form in the last 3 races of the World Triathlon Series. The last three races of the season were a different story: she always finished in the top 15, with the highlight of the 9th position in Cozumel, and she was always among the first top 5 times in the running fraction. These end season performances gave a big boost to her rankings as she finished the year at the 57th position in ITU Point list and 58th in the ITU Olympic Qualification List, and back into the athletes going to Rio 2016. And she was again awarded the Belgian Triathlon female "Athlète de l'année 2015".

The Olympic year did not start very well for Michel, finishing the first 4 races of 2016 always at the bottom of the standings, always due to bad performances in the bike fraction. This negative trend ended in Chengdu where, despite a bad swim fraction which put her 1'18" behind the best swimmer Summer Cook, she was able to catch the right "bike train", arrive in T2 in the first group, and run herself in the first second position of her career, 36 seconds behind the winner Cook.

In the last two Olympic qualifying races she didn't perform very well (19th place and a DNF) but still was able to keep her position inside the top 50 athletes to be selected for Rio.

After having secured the qualification for Rio, Michel competed in Stockholm, finishing with 17th, followed by two wins in Belgian Sprint Championship and Europa Cup Sprint distance in Rotterdam.

The Olympic games didn't go well for Michel, at the bottom of the group in the swimming leg, lapped during the bike leg, thus disqualified. Same result at the World Cup Final in Cozumel, Mexico, where she was lapped during the bike ride.

Michel, after the disappointment, decided to focus on the next Olympic games, moving to San Diego and joining the Triathlon Squad coached by coach Paulo Sousa in San Diego.

== Results ==
Claire Michel's ITU and ETU race results are:

Results list

Date	Competition	Distance	Place	Rank
08/06/2013	European Cup	Sprint	Cremona	20
29/06/2013	Premium European Cup	Sprint	Holten	9
25/08/2013	European Cup	Olympic	Karlovy Vary	9
11/09/2013	World Championships	Aquathlon	London	Silver
29/09/2013	World Cup	Olympic	Alicante	32
15/03/2014	World Cup	Sprint	Mooloolaba	21
23/03/2014	World Cup	Sprint	New Plymouth	23
06/04/2014	World Triathlon Series	Olympic	Auckland	27
10/05/2014	World Cup	Olympic	Chengdu	Bronze
17/05/2014	World Triathlon Series	Olympic	Yokohama	6
20/06/2014	European Championships	Olympic	Kitzbühel	17
28/06/2014	World Triathlon Series	Olympic	Chicago	28
12/07/2014	World Triathlon Series	Sprint	Hamburg	40
29/08/2014	World Triathlon Series Grand Final	Olympic	Edmonton	24
22/03/2015	World Cup	Sprint	New Plymouth	24
29/03/2015	World Triathlon Series	Olympic	Auckland	DNF
26/04/2015	World Triathlon Series	Olympic	Cape Town	DNF
31/05/2015	World Triathlon Series	Sprint	London	17
13/06/2015	European Games	Olympic	Baku	8
09/08/2015	European Cup	Sprint	Riga	4
22/08/2015	World Triathlon Series	Olympic	Stockholm	DNF
06/09/2015	World Triathlon Series	Sprint	Edmonton	32
18/09/2015	World Triathlon Series Grand Final	Olympic	Chicago	52
04/10/2015	World Cup	Sprint	Cozumel	9
17/10/2015	World Cup	Olympic	Alanya	14
24/10/2015	World Cup	Olympic	Tongyeong	12
05/03/2016	World Triathlon Series	Olympic	Abu Dhabi	50
12/03/2016	World Cup	Sprint	Mooloolaba	37
03/04/2016	World Cup	Sprint	New Plymouth	38
09/04/2016	World Triathlon Series	Olympic	Gold Coast	37
16/04/2016	World Cup	Olympic	Chengdu	Silver
07/05/2016	World Cup	Olympic	Huatulco	19
14/05/2016	World Triathlon Series	Olympic	Yokohama	DNF
12/06/2016	Belgian Championship	Sprint	Gullegem	Gold
02/07/2016	World Triathlon Series	Olympic	Stockholm	17
14/05/2016	European Cup	Sprint	Rotterdam	Gold
20/08/2016	Olympic Games	Olympic	Rio	LAP
17/09/2016	World Triathlon Series Grand Final	Olympic	Cozumel	LAP
