= Anastasia Gorbunova =

Russian triathlete (born 1994)

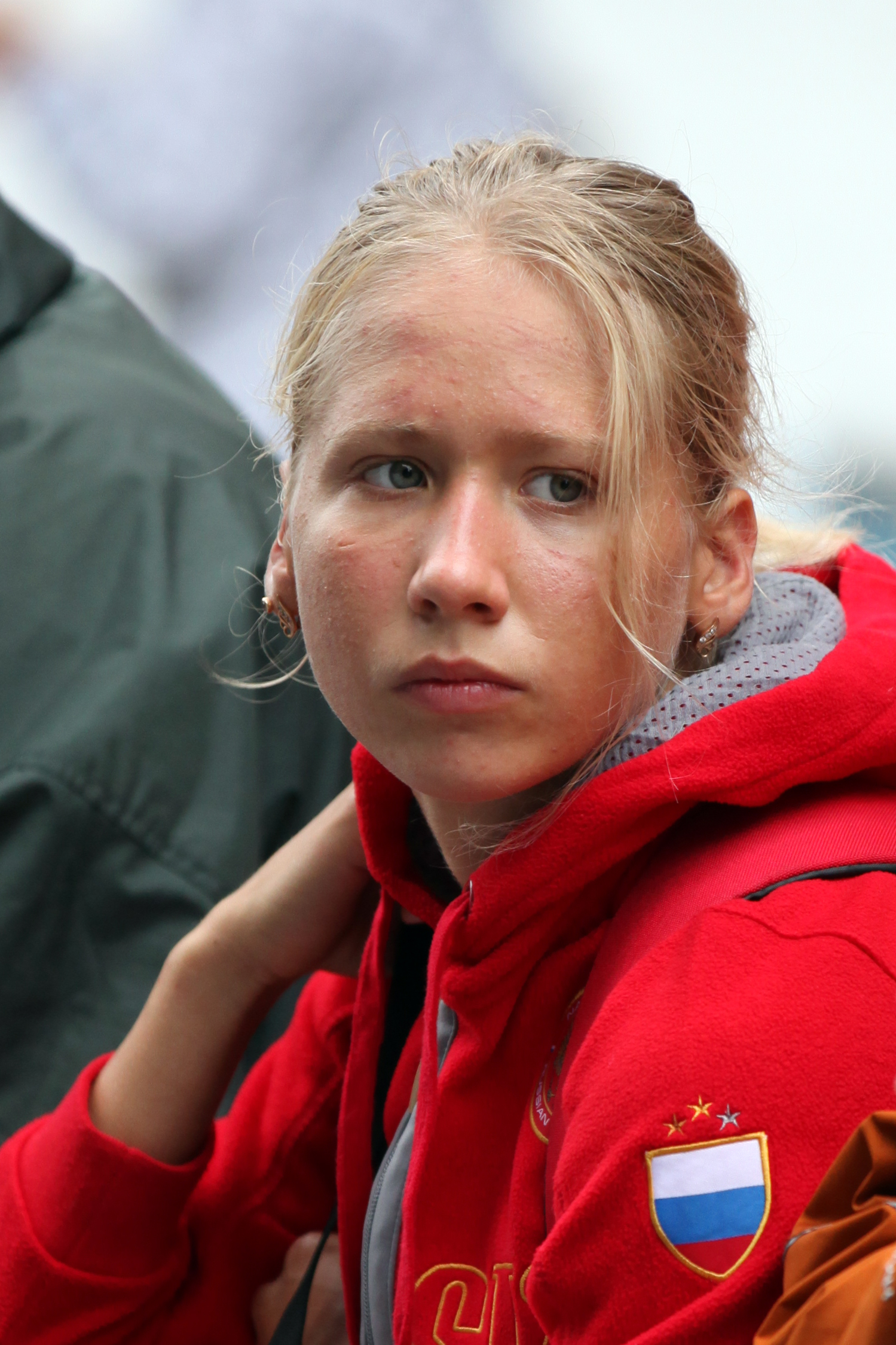
- 2011

Personal information
- Nationality: Russian
- Born: 17 May 1994 (age 31); Novocheboksarsk, Russia

Sport
- Sport: Triathlon

Anastasia Gorbunova (born 17 May 1994) is a Russian triathlete. She competed in the women's event at the 2020 Summer Olympics held in Tokyo, Japan. She also competed in the mixed relay event.
