= Richard Varga (triathlete) =

Slovak triathlete (born 1989)

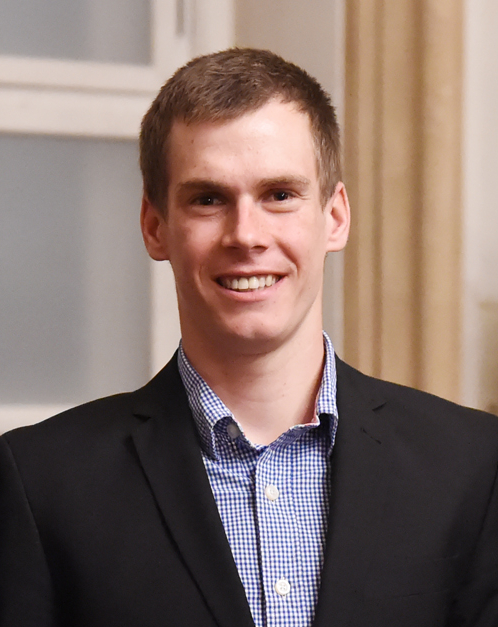
- Varga in 2015

Personal information
- Born: 28 January 1989 (age 37) Bratislava, Czechoslovakia
- Height: 1.88 m (6 ft 2 in)
- Weight: 65 kg (143 lb)

Sport
- Country: Slovakia
- Sport: Triathlon
Medal record
Men's aquathlon
Representing Slovakia
ITU Aquathlon World Championships
Gold medal – first place	2015	Elite
Gold medal – first place	2013	Elite
Gold medal – first place	2012	Elite
Gold medal – first place	2010	Elite
Silver medal – second place	2016	Elite
Silver medal – second place	2021	Elite

Richard Varga (born 28 January 1989) is a Slovak retired triathlete. He won the 2010, 2012, 2013, and 2015 ITU Aquathlon World Championships.

Varga represented Slovakia at the 2012 Summer Olympics in men's triathlon. He had the fastest swim split of the event before eventually finishing in 22nd place.

On 2 May, Varga announced his retirement from professional sport at the age of 36.
