= Lenka Radová =

Czech triathlete

Personal information
- Full name: Lenka Radová-Zemanová
- Born: 9 October 1979 (age 46) Plzeň, Czechoslovakia
- Height: 1.61 m (5 ft 3 in)
- Weight: 49 kg (108 lb)

Sport
- Country: Czech Republic
- Club: Olympo Elite Team Brno
- Team: EKOL Elite Triathlon Team
Medal record
Women's triathlon
Representing Czech Republic
ITU Triathlon World Cup
Silver medal – second place	2002 Madeira	Elite
Silver medal – second place	2002 Tiszaújváros	Elite

Lenka Radová-Zemanová (born 9 October 1979) is a Czech triathlete. She competed at two Olympic games (2004 in Athens, and 2008 in Beijing). At the 2004 Summer Olympics, Radová-Zemanová finished in twenty-sixth place for the women's triathlon with a total time of 2:09:54. Meanwhile, at the 2008 Summer Olympics, Radová-Zemanová started out of the competition by maintaining her pace in the swimming leg of the women's event. Finishing in twenty-fourth place at both swimming and first transition phases, Radová-Zemanová had moved her way into a small group of competitors chasing the breakaways of the 40-km cycling race, until she crashed her bike and did not finish the race.

At the peak of her career, Radová-Zemanová took part in more than 50 ITU and ETU competitions, and had achieved twenty-nine top-ten finishes. Her best results happened in 2002, when she claimed two silver medals at the ITU World Triathlon Cup in Madeira, Portugal, and in Tiszaújváros, Hungary.
