= Matt Reed =

New Zealand-American triathlete

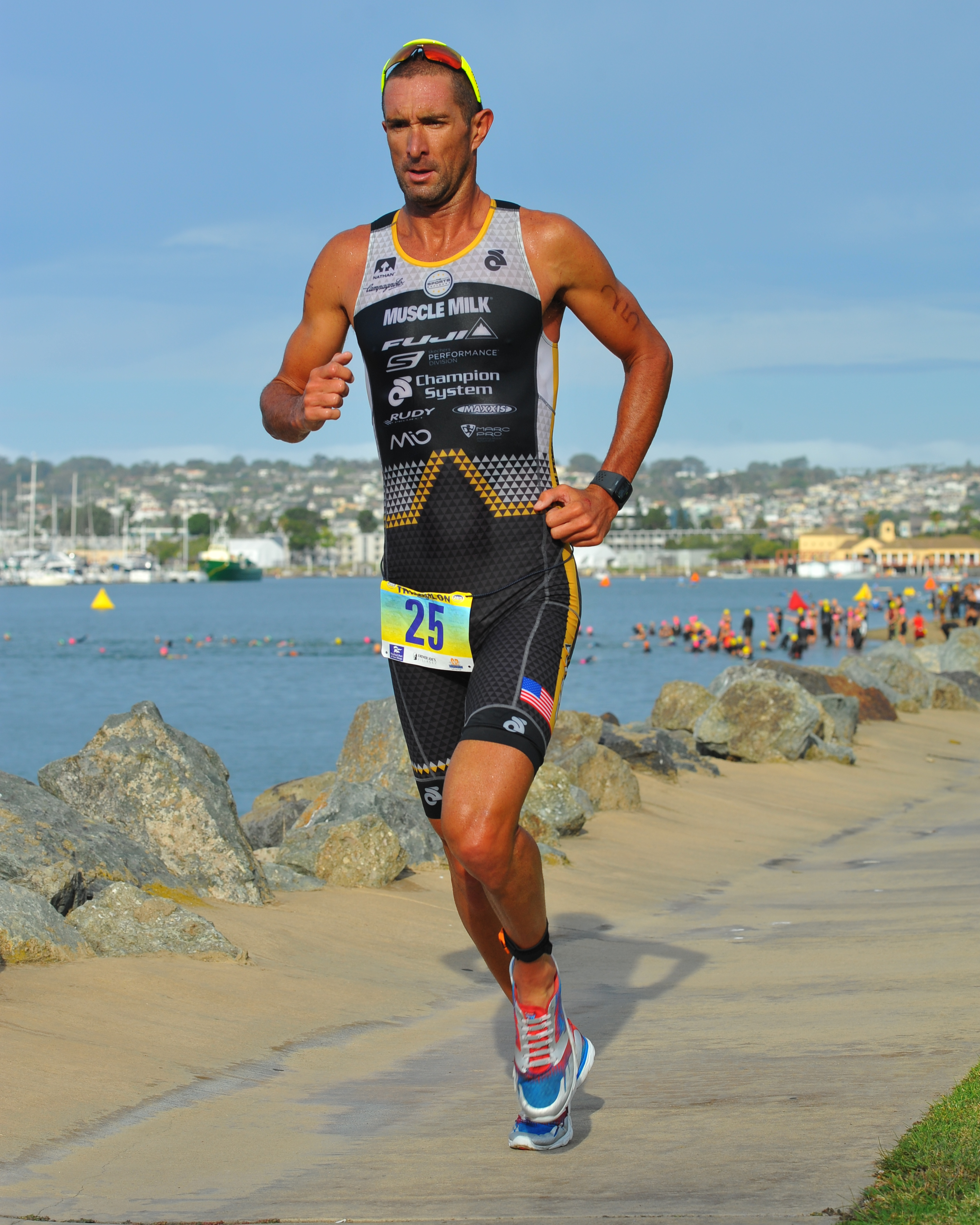
- Matthew Reed at 2015 San Diego International Triathlon

Personal information
- Born: December 8, 1975 (age 50) Palmerston North, New Zealand
- Relative: Shane Reed (brother)

Sport
- Sport: Triathlon

Matthew Reed (born November 8, 1975, in Palmerston North, New Zealand) is an American elite triathlete. Reed became a US citizen in 2007, and lives and trains in Arizona.

In 2009, Reed won 7 triathlons and the Toyota Cup Series. His triumphs came at Ironman California 70.3, Miami International Triathlon, Pan American Championships, REV 3 Half-Ironman, Life Time Fitness Minneapolis, Chicago Triathlon and Dallas Triathlon.

Reed was named USA Triathlon’s Athlete of the Year for 2008. He won the US Olympic trials and placed thirty-second at the Beijing Games. Reed also finished fifth in the 2008 World Championships, the highest place ever for an American male.
