= Ivan Ivanov (triathlete) =

Ukrainian triathlete

Ivan Oleksiyovych Ivanov (Ukrainian: Іван Олексійович Іванов; born 8 January 1989) is a Ukrainian professional triathlete. In 2013 he finished second at the ITU Aquathlon World Championships. He earned a bronze medal at the ITU World Cup event in Edmonton.

Ivanov competed at the 2016 Summer Olympics, finishing 49th. Initially he had not qualified.
