= Maria Cześnik =

Polish triathlete (born 1977)

Personal information
- Born: 3 August 1977 (age 48) Warsaw, Poland

Sport
- Sport: Triathlon

Maria Cześnik (born 3 August 1977) is a Polish triathlete. She competed at the 2008 and 2012 Summer Olympics.
