= Sara Vilic =

Austrian triathlete (born 1992)

Personal information
- Born: 29 March 1992 (age 34)

Sport
- Sport: Triathlon

Sara Vilic (born 29 March 1992) is an Austrian triathlete. She finished in third place at the 2013 ITU Triathlon World Cup event in Tiszaújváros.
