= Margit Vanek =

Hungarian triathlete

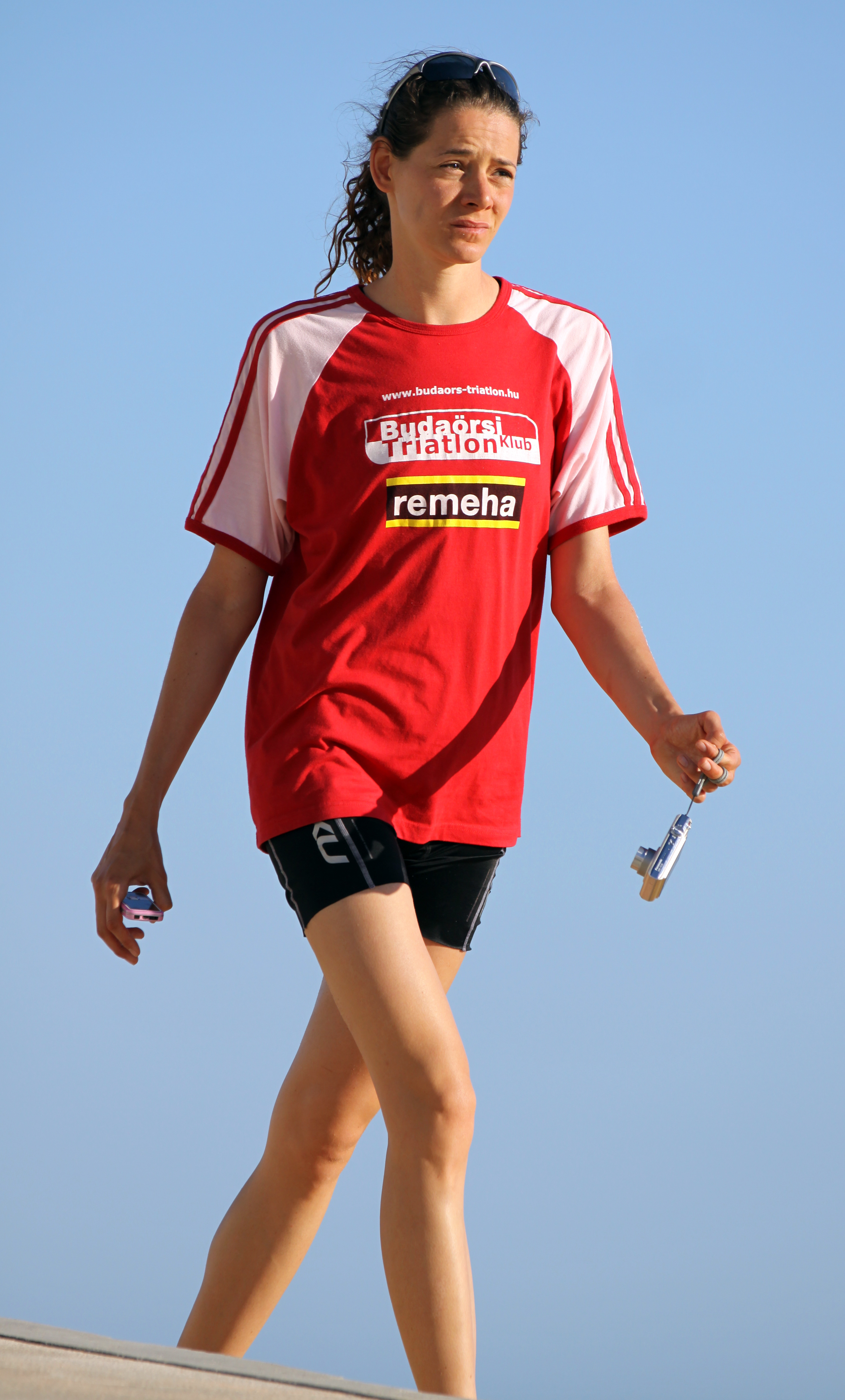
Margit Vanek at the European Cup elite triathlon in Quarteira, 2011.

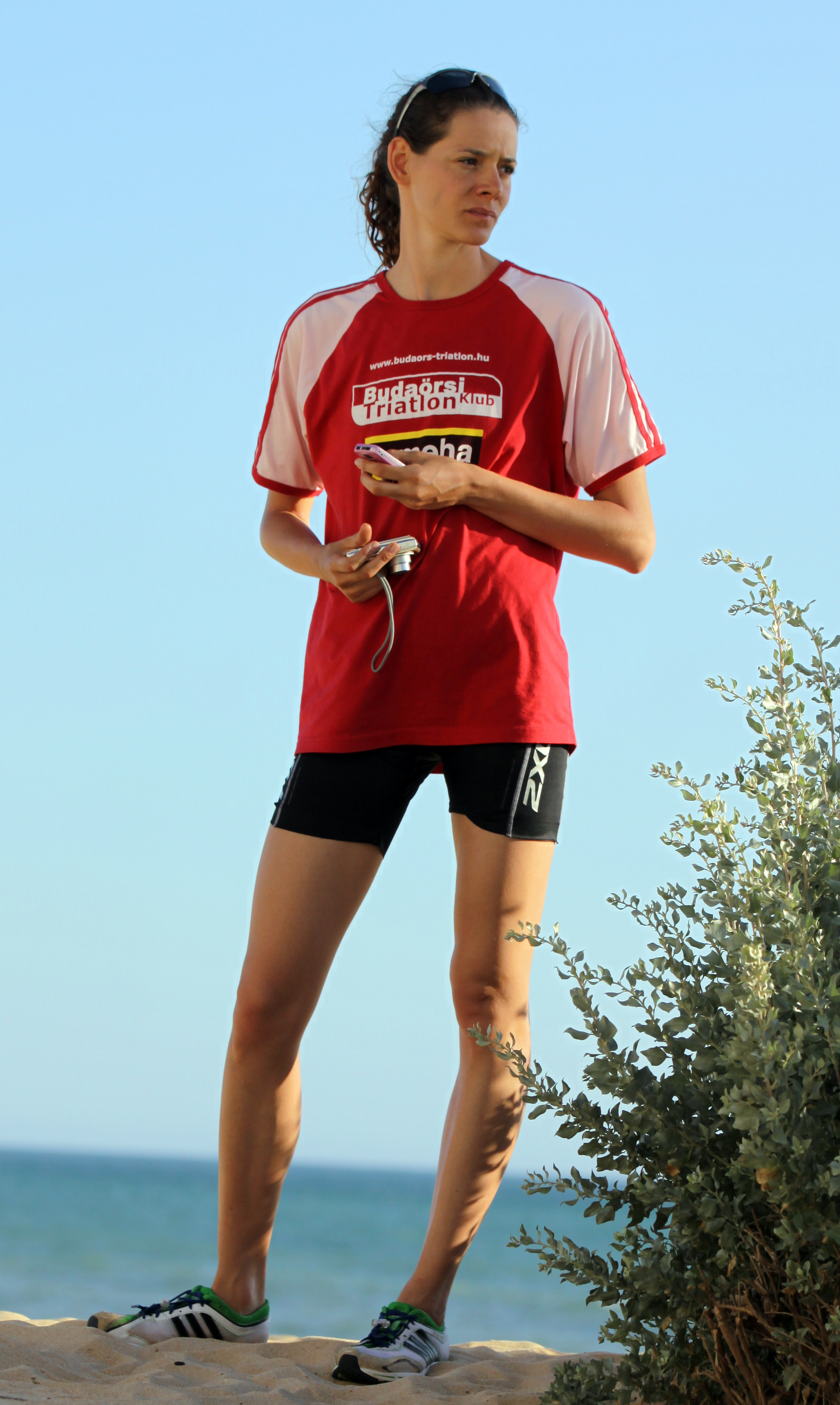
Margit Vanek at the European Cup elite triathlon in Quarteira, 2011.

Margit Vanek (born 25 February 1986 in Budapest), is a Hungarian professional triathlete, number 5 of the 2010 Hungarian Ranglista, and the Aquathlon World Champion of the year 2010.

Vanek also takes part in non ITU races, e.g. the first Garmin Milano City Triathlon (2010) at which she won the gold medal.

In 2010, Vanek competes in the prestigious French Club Championship Series representing TCG79 Parthenay.

In Hungary, Margit Vanek represents Budaörsi Triatlon Klub Egyesület and lives in Budaörs.

== ITU Competitions ==
In the five years from 2006 to 2010, Vanek took part in 21 ITU triathlons and achieved four top ten positions. In 2011, Vanek opened the season with three top ten positions. The following list is based upon the official ITU rankings and the Athletes's Profile Page. Unless indicated otherwise, the following events are triathlons (Olympic Distance) and belong to the Elite category.

Date	Competition	Place	Rank
2005-07-23	European Championships (Junior)	Alexandroupoli(s)	26
2006-07-08	European Championships (U23)	Rijeka	16
2006-08-13	BG World Cup	Tiszaújváros	33
2006-09-02	World Championships (U23)	Lausanne	23
2007-05-06	BG World Cup	Lisbon	40
2007-07-21	European Championships (U23)	Kuopio	4
2007-08-11	BG World Cup	Tiszaújváros	DNS
2008-05-18	European Cup	Brno	11
2008-06-14	European Cup	Balatonfured	2
2008-07-13	BG World Cup	Tiszaújváros	18
2008-09-06	European Championships (U23)	Pulpí	15
2008-09-27	BG World Cup	Lorient	DNF
2009-04-26	World Cup	Ishigaki	DNF
2009-08-09	World Cup	Tiszaújváros	DNF
2009-09-26	European Cup	Mar Menor	11
2010-04-11	Dextro Energy World Championship Series	Sydney	DNF
2010-06-27	Premium Asian Cup	Burabay	2
2010-07-10	World Cup	Holten	16
2010-08-08	World Cup	Tiszaújváros	23
2010-08-21	Elite Sprint World Championships	Lausanne	39
2010-09-08	Dextro Energy World Championship Series, Grand Final	Budapest	46
2010-09-08	Aquathlon World Championships	Budapest	1
2011-03-20	Pan American Cup	Santiago	6
2011-03-27	Premium Pan American Cup	Valparaiso	8
2011-04-09	European Cup	Quarteira	7
2011-05-08	World Cup	Monterrey	23
2011-06-18	Dextro Energy World Championship Series	Kitzbuhel	37
2011-06-24	European Championships	Pontevedra	28
2011-07-10	World Cup	Edmonton	16
2011-08-14	World Cup	Tiszaújváros	14

BG = the sponsor British Gas · DNF = did not finish · DNS = did not start
