= Anastasia Abrosimova =

Russian triathlete (born 1990)

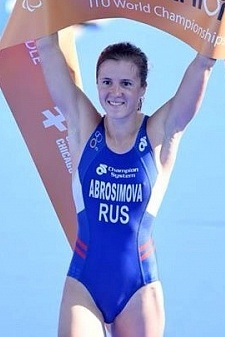

Personal information
- Born: 17 July 1990 (age 36) Novy Urgal, Russia

Sport
- Sport: Triathlon

Anastasia Aleksandrovna Abrosimova (born 17 July 1990) is a Russian triathlete. She won the 2015 ITU Aquathlon World Championships. The following year, she competed in the women's event at the 2016 Summer Olympics.
