= Yuliya Yelistratova =

Ukrainian triathlete (born 1988)

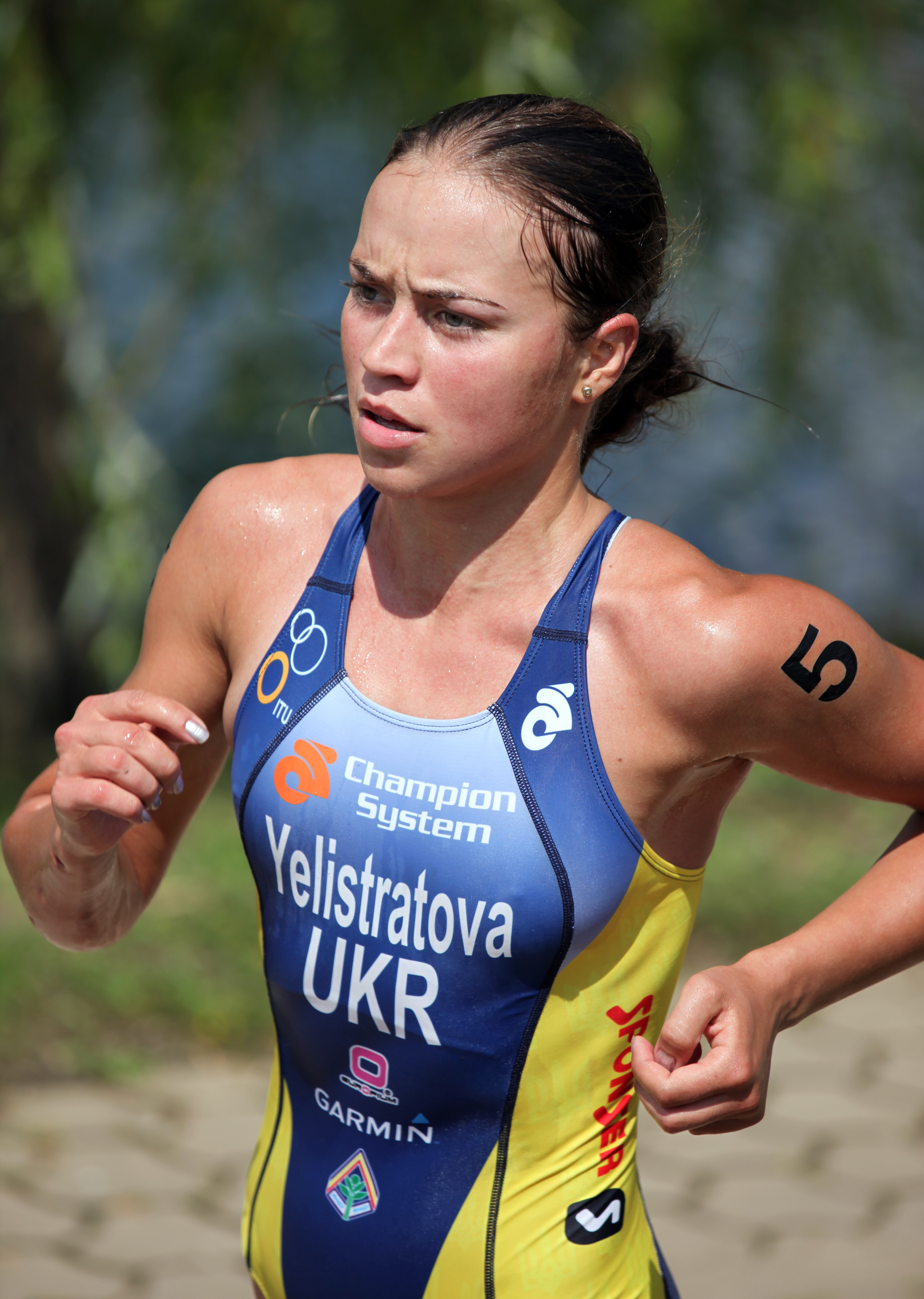
Yelistratova at the World Cup triathlon in Tiszaújvaros, 2011.

Yuliya Oleksandrivna Yelistratova (Ukrainian: Юлія Олександрівна Єлістратова; born 15 February 1988 in Ovruch, Zhytomyr Oblast, Ukrainian SSR, Soviet Union, is a Ukrainian professional triathlete, European U23 champion of the year 2009, Ranked #1 in the ITU rankings in 2009, several times national champion in various age groups and member of the Ukrainian national team. She competed at the 2008, 2012 and 2016 Summer Olympics.

Yelistratova served a five-year ban which expired in July 2026 for an anti-doping rule violation: she tested positive for EPO in 2021.

== Career ==
On 27 October 2004, Yelistratova took part in her first elite race and placed 9th at the European Cup in Alanya, so at the age of 15 at her Elite debut she effortlessly achieved a top-ten position among the world elite. Since then she has continuously won medals in numerous international events. She is also decorated with the title Master of Sports (Мастер срорта, International Class).

In 2009 Yelistratova took part in four competitions of the prestigious Dextro Energy World Championship Series. In Tongyeong she placed 31st (Elite), in Kitzbühel 6th (Elite), in Yokohama 21st (Elite), and at the Grand Final in Southport (Gold Coast) 5th (U23). At the two World Cup triathlons in Mooloolaba and Tiszaújváros she placed 19th and 5th respectively (Elite), at the European Cup in Brno and the Premium Asia Cup in Beijing she won the gold medals and at the beginning of this season, on 20 June 2009, she won the European U23 Championships in Tarzo Revine. The two last races in 2009 again underlined Yelistratova's dominating role: the U23 triathlete won the gold medal at the Elite Premium European Cup in Eilat and placed 5th at the Elite World Cup in Huatulco.

In 2010, Sapunova placed 2nd at the U23 European Championships and 11th at the U23 World Championships and finally, after disappointing results in some preceding competitions, again she won a gold medal at the World Cup in Tiszaújváros.

Yelistratova's coach for the 2011 season was Sergio Santos.

In October 2023, Yelistratova was issued with a five-year ban backdated to July 2021 after testing positive for EPO twice in 2021.

== Personal life ==
She was married to fellow triathlete Danylo Sapunov.
