= Aquathlon =

Continuous, two-stage race involving swimming followed by running

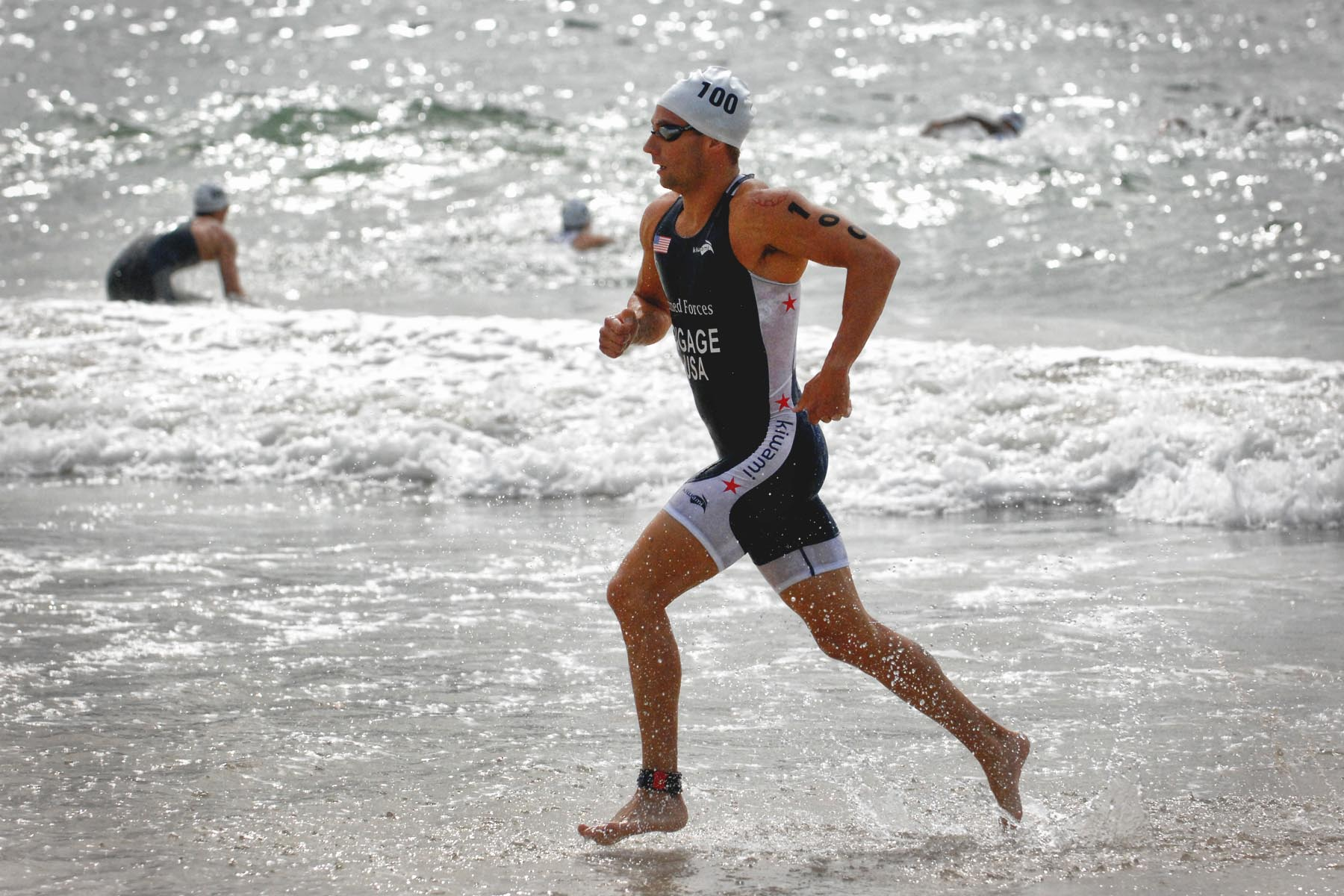
- Highest governing body: International Triathlon Union
- First contested: 20th century

Characteristics
- Contact: No
- Mixed-sex: No
- Type: Endurance sport

Presence
- Country or region: Worldwide

An aquathlon is a multisport race consisting of continuous run and swim elements. Competitors complete a swim immediately followed by a run over various distances. Athletes compete for fastest overall course completion, including the time transitioning between the disciplines.

Aquathlon is one of a family of endurance based multisport races, which gained popularity from triathlon and various independent races in the second half of the twentieth century. Modern aquathlon is viewed as a discipline of triathlon as standard races cover the same distances as triathlon but without the cycling leg. As such the sport is governed by International Triathlon Union who organise the world championships each year.

== History ==
An earliest contested date for aquathlon is hard to state due to it being a combination of swimming and running which both have ancient origins. The modern roots of aquathlon can be traced to life guarding races in Australia, in the 1950s. Races would consist of a run along a beach, swim out to sea round a buoy and swim back to the beach, get out and then run back along the beach. By the 1960s the idea had spread to California in the United States, becoming popular with runners and swimmers. USA Triathlon argue that the first aquathlon event in the USA was the Dave Pain Birthday Biathlon, a race consisting of a run and swim first held in San Diego in 1971. This point is made due to aquathlons relation to triathlon and the fact that the Dave Pain Birthday Biathlon is the race that helped to inspire the first triathlon race (Mission Bay Triathlon) three years later.

== Overview ==
Aquathlon in general follows triathlon distances, but there is variability. Mostly open-water but there are some pool-based sprints/super-sprints.

ITU "Warm water" standard distances are 2.5 km run, 1000m swim, 2.5 km run. If the rated water temperature is below 22 °C then it becomes a wetsuit-mandatory 1000m swim and a single 5 km run. "Long course" distances are 2000m swim and 10 km of running. Where the rated water temperature is low (around 16 °C) then the course may be shortened, and possibly cancelled.

Different national federations have their own distances and temperature rules, typically related to the acclimatisation of national athletes. For example, the Icelanders will train/race at 10 °C whereas the BTF start at 12 °C. BTF aquathlons tend to be 750m wetsuit-mandatory/optional and a 5 km run.

Aquathlons are most similar to triathlons, with the key difference being the lack of a cycle leg. The bike adds extra complexity for both the athletes and race organisers.

- Bikes must be transported to the venue, which can be logistically onerous for the athletes, especially for international events.
- The race director has to select a course that allows space for the bike leg, possibly including road closures.
- They can be run informally in local lakes.

Modern pentathlon is similar to an aquathlon in that both include swimming and running. But swimming and cross-country running are only two of the five events which make up the modern pentathlon, and these are held as distinct, noncontiguous events. Within the pentathlon sport, the term biathle is also used for (training) races comprising swimming and running. These however contain distance stemming from pentathlon races, for instance 200m swimming 3 km running.

Another sport derived from triathlon is duathlon, which combines cycling and running but has omitted the swimming part.

== Events ==
The ITU Aquathlon World Championships have been held annually since 1998.

=== Splash and Dash Youth Series ===
The Splash and Dash Youth Series, organized by USA Triathlon, is a popular variant of aquathlons designed for young athletes aged 7-15. These events combine swimming and running but do not require timing, emphasizing participation over competition. The series, which has over 50 events across the United States, offers a low-barrier entry into multisport activities for children, promoting fun and fitness without the need for extensive equipment.

== See also ==
- Swimrun – swimming and running, but multiple transitions
- Aquacycling – swimming and cycling
