= Zsófia Kovács (triathlete) =

Hungarian triathlete (born 1988)

Zsofia Kovacs
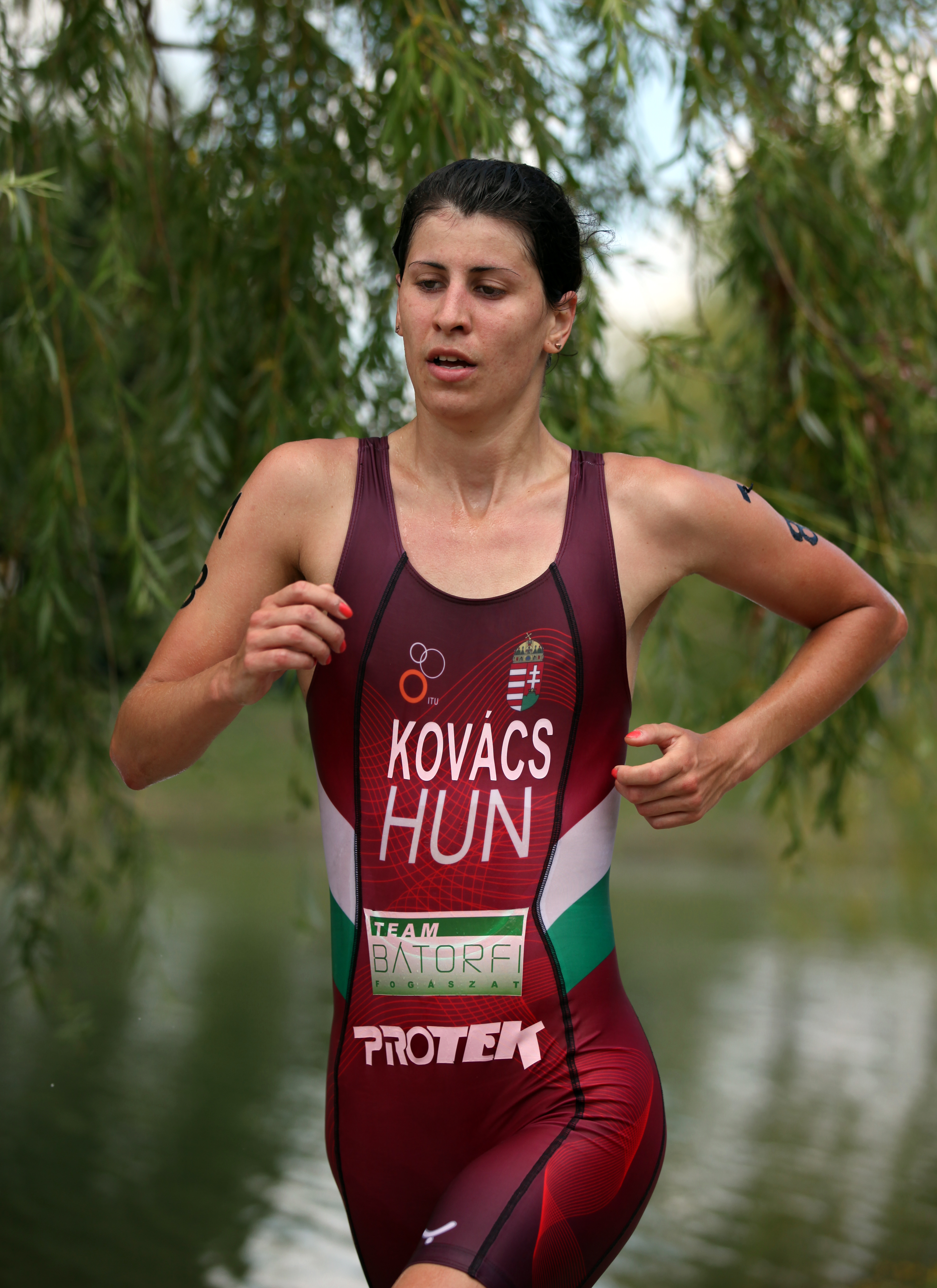
- Zsófia Kovács as the best Hungarian female triathlete at the Tiszaújváros World Cup 2011.
- Born: 7 February 1988 (age 37); Gyöngyös, Hungary
- Occupation: Triathlete

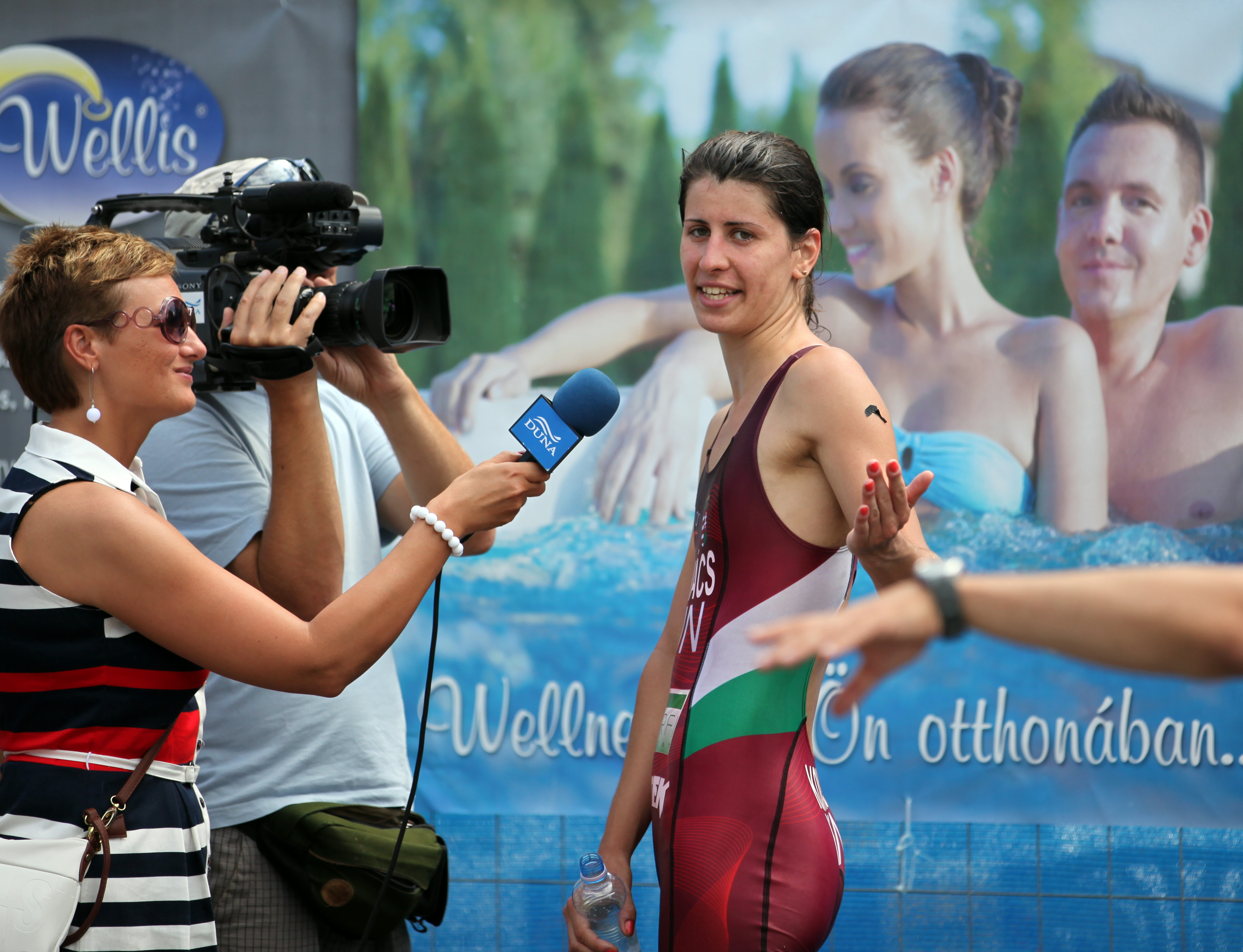
Zsófia Kovács struggling with obtrusive people after the race in Tiszaújváros, 2011.

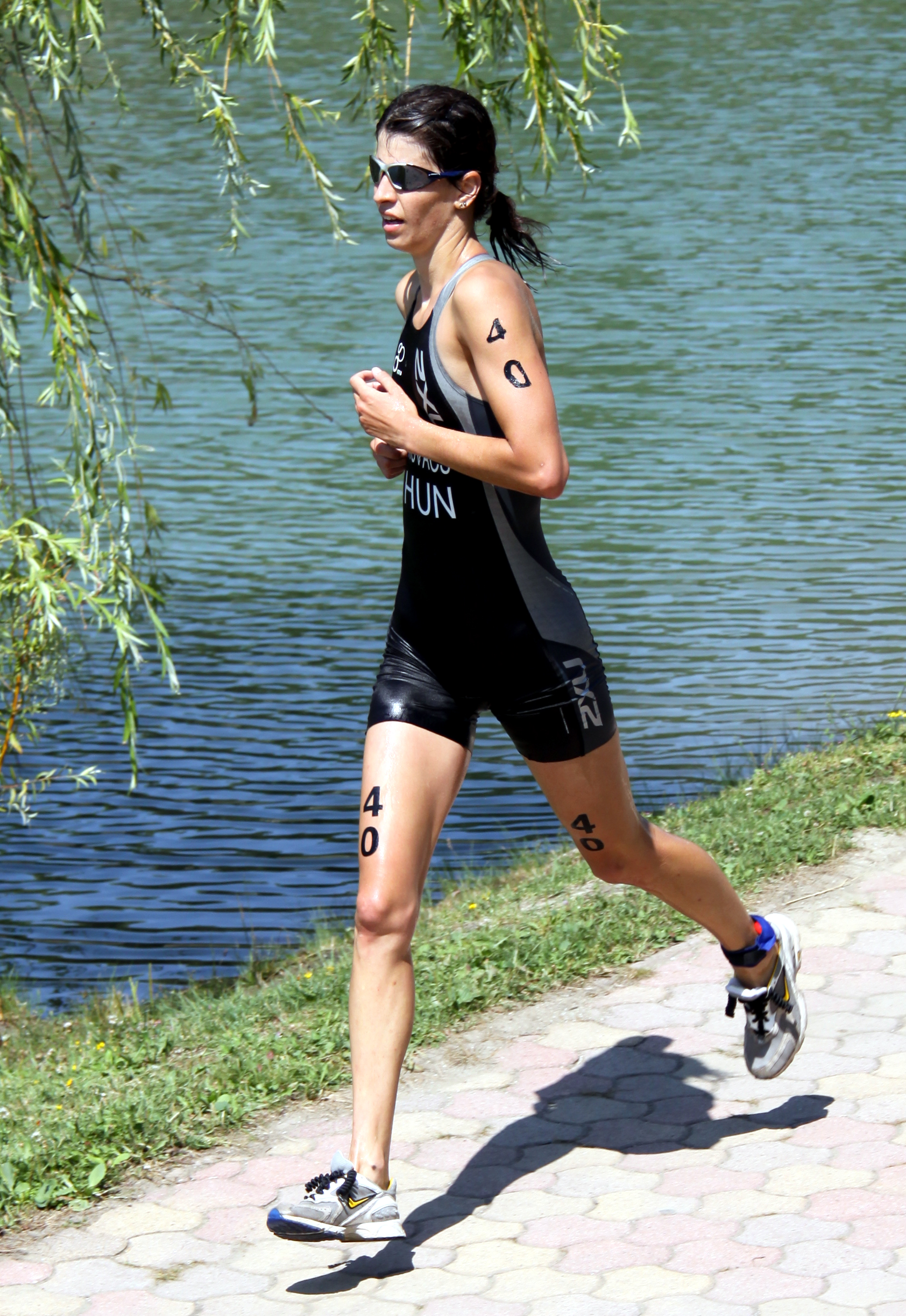
Zsófia Kovács at the Tiszaújváros World Cup 2009.

Zsófia Kovács (born 7 February 1988 in Gyöngyös) is a Hungarian professional triathlete, winner of the Hungarian Cup 2010 (Triatlon Ranglista) and member of the National Team.

Since 2004 Zsófia Kovács has regularly taken part in ITU competitions. Each year, she has achieved top ten positions in various age groups, e.g. the silver medal at the European Championships of the year 2004 (Junior), and, from 2006 onwards, also in the elite class, placing sixth at the Premium European Cup in Eilat (2006), fourth at the European Cup in Balatonfüred (2008), and ninth again at the Premium European Cup in Eilat (2009). In 2009 Kovács won the Hungarian Triathlon Cup called Triatlon Tour after she had placed fifth in 2008 when she was beaten by Zsófia Tóth.

Kovács is an elite member of the triathlon club, GYÖTRI.

Zsófia Kovács still lives in Mátrafüred. She went to the local high school Nagy János Gimnázium in Gyöngyös and was selected, several times, for the national sports promotion scheme Good Student Good Athlete.

She competed in the Women's event at the 2012 Summer Olympics and 2016 Summer Olympics.

== ITU competitions ==
In the seven years from 2004 to 2010, Kovács took part in 35 ITU competitions and achieved 14 top ten positions. The following list is based upon the official ITU rankings and the Athlete's Profile Page. Unless indicated otherwise, the following events are triathlons (Olympic Distance) and belong to the Elite category.

| Date | Competition | Place | Rank |
|---|---|---|---|
| 2004-07-03 | European Championships (Junior) | Lausanne | 2 |
| 2005-07-23 | European Championships (Junior) | Alexandroupoli(s) | DNF |
| 2005-09-10 | World Championships (Junior) | Gamagori | 11 |
| 2006-06-23 | European Championships (Junior) | Autun | 4 |
| 2006-07-08 | European Championships (U23) | Rijeka | 18 |
| 2006-08-13 | BG World Cup | Tiszaújváros | 39 |
| 2006-09-02 | World Championships (Junior) | Lausanne | 9 |
| 2006-10-28 | Premium European Cup | Eilat | 6 |
| 2007-05-06 | BG World Cup | Lisbon | DNF |
| 2007-06-29 | European Championships (Junior) | Copenhagen | 9 |
| 2007-07-21 | European Championships (U23) | Kuopio | 7 |
| 2007-08-11 | BG World Cup | Tiszaújváros | 40 |
| 2007-08-30 | BG World Championships (Junior) | Hamburg | 10 |
| 2007-10-24 | Premium European Cup | Alanya | 12 |
| 2008-06-14 | European Cup | Balatonfured | 4 |
| 2008-06-28 | 9th World University Championship | Erdek | 21 |
| 2008-07-13 | BG World Cup | Tiszaújváros | DNF |
| 2008-09-06 | European Championships (U23) | Pulpí | 8 |
| 2009-05-17 | Premium European Cup | Pontevedra | DNF |
| 2009-06-20 | European Championships (U23) | Tarzo Revine | 10 |
| 2009-07-02 | European Championships | Holten | 32 |
| 2009-08-09 | World Cup | Tiszaújváros | 29 |
| 2009-08-30 | Premium European Cup | Kedzierzyn Kozle | 16 |
| 2009-10-25 | Premium European Cup | Alanya | 15 |
| 2009-11-21 | Premium European Cup | Eilat | 9 |
| 2010-04-11 | European Cup | Quarteira | 21 |
| 2010-05-22 | European Cup | Senec | 9 |
| 2010-05-30 | African Cup | Larache | 2 |
| 2010-06-12 | Elite Cup | Hy-Vee | 46 |
| 2010-07-10 | World Cup | Holten | 20 |
| 2010-08-08 | World Cup | Tiszaújváros | 8 |
| 2010-08-21 | Sprint World Championships | Lausanne | 31 |
| 2010-09-08 | Dextro Energy World Championship Series, Grand Final: U23 World Championship | Larache | 14 |
| 2010-10-10 | World Cup | Huatulco | 11 |
| 2010-10-24 | Premium European Cup | Alanya | 15 |
| 2011-03-26 | World Cup | Mooloolaba | 12 |
| 2011-04-09 | Dextro Energy World Championship Series | Sydney | 32 |
| 2011-05-08 | World Cup | Monterrey | 32 |
| 2011-06-18 | Dextro Energy World Championship Series | Kitzbuhel | 24 |
| 2011-06-24 | European Championships | Pontevedra | 7 |
| 2011-08-14 | World Cup | Tiszaújváros | 7 |
| 2011-08-20 | Sprint World Championships | Lausanne | 36 |
| 2011-08-21 | Team World Championships | Lausanne | 8 |
| 2011-09-09 | Dextro Energy World Championship Series, Grand Final: U23 World Championships | Beijing | 2 |

DNF = did not finish · BG = the sponsor British Gas
