= Triathlon at the 2015 European Games – Men's individual =

Men's at the 2015 European Games
- Venue: Bilgah Beach
- Date: 14 June
- Competitors: 57 from 33 nations

Medalists
gold medal	Gordon Benson	Great Britain
silver medal	João Silva	Portugal
bronze medal	Rostyslav Pevtsov	Azerbaijan

== Results ==
Legend

- DNF — Did not finish
- LAP — Lapped

The men's triathlon was part of the Triathlon at the 2015 European Games program, was held in Bilgah Beach Triathlon Venue on June 14, 2015.

The race was held over the "international distance" and consisted of 1,500 metres (0.93 mi) swimming, 40 kilometres (25 mi) road bicycle racing, and 9.945 kilometres (6.180 mi) road running.

== Schedule ==
All times are Azerbaijan Standard Time (UTC+04:00)

Date	Time	Event
Sunday, 14 June 2015	14:00	Final

== Result ==
Rank	Athlete	Swim 1.5 km	Trans. 1	Bike 40 km	Trans. 2	Run 9.945 km	Total time
1st place, gold medalist(s)	Gordon Benson (GBR)	19:17	0:45	56:05	0:26	31:58	1:48:31
2nd place, silver medalist(s)	João Silva (POR)	19:30	0:43	57:40	0:24	30:25	1:48:42
3rd place, bronze medalist(s)	Rostyslav Pevtsov (AZE)	19:30	0:42	57:44	0:28	30:40	1:49:04
4	Aleksandr Latin (EST)	19:31	0:47	55:51	0:28	32:44	1:49:21
5	Richard Varga (SVK)	19:15	0:46	56:42	0:24	33:01	1:49:32
6	Jonas Schomburg (TUR)	19:15	0:45	56:08	0:24	33:02	1:49:34
7	Alexander Bryukhankov (RUS)	19:24	0:45	57:46	0:27	31:20	1:49:42
8	João Pereira (POR)	18:42	0:42	57:42	0:24	31:30	1:49:46
9	Andrea Salvisberg (SUI)	18:42	0:50	56:35	0:26	33:34	1:50:07
10	Yegor Martynenko (UKR)	19:28	0:42	57:37	0:25	31:55	1:50:11
11	Fernando Alarza (ESP)	19:26	0:46	57:43	0:27	32:07	1:50:29
12	Delian Stateff (ITA)	19:22	0:47	57:43	0:24	32:15	1:50:31
13	Leo Bergere (FRA)	19:36	0:43	57:33	0:24	32:21	1:50:37
14	Kristian Blummenfelt (NOR)	19:26	0:46	57:27	0:29	32:35	1:50:43
15	Oleksiy Syutkin (UKR)	19:19	0:49	57:46	0:27	32:37	1:50:58
16	Thomas Bishop (GBR)	18:48	0:48	56:34	0:31	34:19	1:51:00
17	Vicente Hernández (ESP)	18:45	0:46	58:21	0:24	33:07	1:51:23
18	Ognjen Stojanović (SRB)	19:31	0:45	57:38	0:27	33:08	1:51:29
19	Riccardo De Palma (ITA)	19:31	0:43	57:37	0:25	33:24	1:51:40
20	Bob Haller (LUX)	19:33	0:45	55:52	0:21	35:12	1:51:43
21	Aliaksandr Vasilevich (BLR)	19:32	0:45	57:39	0:25	33:25	1:51:46
22	František Linduška (CZE)	19:32	0:46	57:36	0:28	33:39	1:52:01
23	Lucas Jacolin (FRA)	19:24	0:44	57:45	0:23	33:57	1:52:13
24	David Castro Fajardo (ESP)	19:28	0:44	57:28	0:27	34:31	1:52:38
25	Matthias Steinwandter (ITA)	19:28	0:44	57:41	0:26	34:29	1:52:48
26	Jonas Breinlinger (GER)	19:25	0:46	55:59	0:26	36:19	1:52:55
27	Mateusz Rak (POL)	19:27	0:46	57:42	0:28	35:01	1:53:24
28	Ivan Ivanov (UKR)	19:31	0:44	57:40	0:26	35:10	1:53:31
29	Domen Dornik (SLO)	19:27	0:49	57:40	0:22	35:19	1:53:37
30	Peter Denteneer (BEL)	19:36	0:43	57:34	0:23	35:29	1:53:45
31	Casper Stenderup (DEN)	19:25	0:44	57:42	0:29	35:27	1:53:47
32	Gábor Faldum (HUN)	19:32	0:42	57:41	0:24	35:38	1:53:57
33	Tomáš Svoboda (CZE)	19:28	0:49	57:39	0:24	35:48	1:54:08
34	Pedro Palma (POR)	20:21	0:43	1:00:19	0:25	32:25	1:54:13
35	Amitai Yonah (ISR)	20:23	0:48	1:00:11	0:31	32:32	1:54:25
36	Russell White (IRL)	19:28	0:50	57:37	0:26	36:20	1:54:41
37	Shachar Sagiv (ISR)	20:10	0:43	1:00:28	0:25	33:32	1:55:18
38	Igor Polyanski (RUS)	18:46	0:47	58:21	0:28	37:13	1:55:35
39	František Kubínek (CZE)	19:56	0:48	1:00:39	0:25	35:07	1:56:55
40	Bence Bicsák (HUN)	19:53	0:41	1:00:47	0:25	35:40	1:57:26
41	Miłosz Sowiński (POL)	20:22	0:46	1:00:15	0:27	35:46	1:57:36
42	László Tarnai (HUN)	20:53	0:45	1:02:59	0:24	32:53	1:57:54
43	Matija Lukina (CRO)	20:21	0:46	1:00:14	0:25	36:30	1:58:16
44	Lukáš Šiška (SVK)	19:55	0:50	1:03:51	0:27	35:54	2:00:57
45	Grigoris Souvatzoglou (GRE)	19:35	0:47	1:01:02	0:35	39:46	2:01:45
46	Philip Graves (GBR)	19:33	0:47	55:49	0:26	47:11	2:03:46
—	James Chronis (GRE)	19:36	0:43	57:32	0:26		DNF
—	Gustav Iden (NOR)	20:53	0:48	1:02:55	0:24		DNF
—	Dmitry Polyanski (RUS)	18:43	0:48	58:25	0:25		DNF
—	Aaron O'Brien (IRL)	20:16	0:46	1:00:18	0:30		DNF
—	Alexander Iatcenko (AZE)	21:44	0:46				DNF
—	Andrejs Dmitrijevs (LAT)	22:08	0:49				DNF
—	Matija Krivec (CRO)	22:23	0:50				LAP
—	Keith Galea (MLT)	23:49	0:53				LAP
—	Ciprian Bălănescu (ROU)	24:03	0:44				LAP
—	Tautvydas Kopūstas (LTU)	24:57	0:54				LAP
—	Emil Stoynev (BUL)	21:47	1:06				DNF
