= Europe Triathlon Sprint Championships =

Triathlon competitions in Europe

- Status: active
- Genre: sporting event
- Date: mid-year
- Frequency: annual
- Country: varying
- Years active: 10
- Inaugurated: 2016
- Most recent: 2025 Melilla
- Organiser: European Triathlon Union

The Europe Triathlon Sprint Championships are the main sprint distance triathlon championships for elite athletes in Europe, organised by Europe Triathlon. Conducted over a 750m swim, 20 kilometre bike and 5 kilometre run, the event has been run since 2016. Since 2023 the event has been branded European Triathlon Championships, but is a separate event from the older Olympic-distance event of that name.

== Editions of sprint championships ==
Year	City	Country	Date
2016	Châteauroux	France	26 June
2017	Düsseldorf	Germany	24 June
2018	Tartu	Estonia	18-22 July
2019	Kazan	Russia	26-28 July
2020	not held due to Covid-19		
2021	not held due to Covid-19		
2022	Olsztyn	Poland	27-29 May
2023	Balıkesir	Turkey	4-6 August
2024	Balıkesir	Turkey	9-11 August
2025	Melilla	Spain	19-20 July
2026	Elblag	Poland	31 July-1 August

== Men's medalists ==
Year	Gold	Silver	Bronze
2016	Vincent Luis; France	Rostislav Pevtsov; Azerbaijan	Grant Sheldon; Great Britain
2017	Joao Pereira; Portugal	Pierre Le Corre; France	Joao Silva; Portugal
2018	Richard Varga; Slovakia	Uxio Abuin; Spain	Roberto Sanchez; Spain
2019	Gordon Benson; Great Britain	Sam Dickinson; Great Britain	Rostislav Pevtsov; Azerbaijan
2020	not held due to Covid-19		
2021	not held due to Covid-19		
2022	Valentin Wernz; Germany	Barclay Izzard; Great Britain	Anthony Pujades; France
2023	Ricardo Batista; Portugal	Lasse Nygaard Priester; Germany	Richard Murray; Netherlands
2024	Nicola Azzano; Italy	Euan De Nigro; Italy	Maxime Fluri; Switzerland
2025	Alessio Crociani; Italy	Shachar Sagiv; Israel	Sebastian Wernersen; Norway
2026	Milan Lariviere; France	Michael Gar; Great Britain	Zalán Hóbor; Hungary

== Women's medalist ==
Year	Gold	Silver	Bronze
2016	Lucy Hall; Great Britain	Jess Learmonth; Great Britain	Cassandre Beaugrand; France
2017	Laura Lindemann; Germany	Jolanda Annen; Switzerland	Vendula Frintova; Czech Republic
2018	Sophie Coldwell; Great Britain	Alexandra Razarenova; Russia	Kaidi Kivioja; Estonia
2019	Julie Derron; Switzerland	Petra Kurikova; Czech Republic	Tamara Gomez Garrido; Spain
2020	not held due to Covid-19		
2021	not held due to Covid-19		
2022	Nina Eim; Germany	Lena Meissner; Germany	Cathia Schar; Switzerland
2023	Mathilde Gautier; France	Selina Klemt; Germany	Jessica Fullagar; Great Britain
2024	Sandra Dodet; France	Marlene Gomez-Göggel; Germany	Zuzana Michaličková; Slovakia
2025	Jolien Vermeylen; Belgium	Bianca Seregni; Italy	Franka Rust; Germany
2026	Roksana Suplek; Poland	Ambre Grasset; France	Léa Houart; France

== See also ==
- European Triathlon Championships
- Triathlon at the European Games
