= Ran Shantal =

Israeli sailor

Personal information
- Native name: רן שנטל
- Nationality: Israel
- Born: May 25, 1971 (age 55) Jaffa, Israel

Sailing career
- Sport: Sailing
- Club: Hapoel Tel Aviv, Tel Aviv, Israel
- Class: Two-Person Dinghy (470)

Ran Shantal (also "Shental" or "Chantal"; Hebrew: רן שנטל; born May 25, 1971) is an Israeli Olympic competitive sailor.

== Early life ==
Shantal was born in Jaffa, Israel, and is Jewish. His brother is Olympic competitive sailor Nir Shental.

== Sailing career ==
His club is Hapoel Tel Aviv, in Tel Aviv, Israel.

In 1987, Shantal and his brother Nir won the gold medal in the 17th International Yacht Racing Union (IYRU) Youth Sailing World Championships in the 420 dinghy—Open in Botany Bay, NSW, Australia. They beat out future Olympians Jean-François Berthet and Gwenael Berthet of France. In August 1988, he won the silver medal in the 470 dinghy Junior World Championship in the 470 - Open, in Puck, Poland.

In 1993, Shantal and his brother won the silver medal in the 470 World Championships. In 1995, he and his brother won the bronze medal in the 470 World Championships in the 470-Men, in Toronto, Canada. That year, he and his brother were named Israel's Sportsmen of the Year in a ceremony conducted by Israeli Prime Minister Yitzhak Rabin.

Shantal (at the age of 25) and his brother competed for Israel at the 1996 Summer Olympics in Atlanta, Georgia, in the Sailing--Men's Two Person Dinghy (470), and came in 19th. The next Israeli siblings to compete in the same Olympics were Shachar Sagiv and Ran Sagiv, who competed in the men's triathlon event at the 2020 Summer Olympics in Tokyo in 2021.
