= 2016 Europe Triathlon Sprint Championships =

- Host city: Châteauroux
- Country: France
- Dates: 26 June 2016

The 2016 Châteauroux ETU Sprint Triathlon European Championships, the first continental triathlon championships for the sprint distance, were held in Châteauroux, France, from 26 June 2016.

== Events ==
Event	Gold	Silver	Bronze
Men's individual	Vincent Luis; France	Rostislav Pevtsov; Azerbaijan	Grant Sheldon; Great Britain
Women's individual	Lucy Hall; Great Britain	Jess Learmonth; Great Britain	Cassandre Beaugrand; France

== Results ==
=== Men's race ===
* nr : not recorded due to technical problem

Men's race results
Rank	Triathlete	Nation	Swimm	T1	Bike	T2	Run	Total time
1st place, gold medalist(s)	Vincent Luis	France	00:08:32	00:00:37	00:26:50	00:00:28	00:15:33	00:51:59
2nd place, silver medalist(s)	Rostislav Pevtsov	Azerbaijan	00:08:54	00:00:39	00:26:29	00:00:34	00:15:31	00:52:06
3rd place, bronze medalist(s)	Grant Sheldon	Great Britain	nr	nr	nr	nr	nr	00:52:20
4	Léo Bergere	France	00:08:58	00:00:40	00:26:22	00:00:31	00:15:52	00:52:21
5	Oleksiy Syutkin	Ukraine	00:08:57	00:00:40	00:26:26	00:00:31	00:15:51	00:52:23
6	Tom Richard	France	00:08:59	00:00:41	00:26:20	00:00:29	00:15:56	00:52:24
7	Florin Salvisberg	Switzerland	00:08:55	00:00:42	00:26:26	00:00:27	00:15:57	00:52:24
8	Andreas Schilling	Denmark	00:09:01	00:00:41	00:26:18	00:00:29	00:16:07	00:52:34
9	Yegor Martynenko	Ukraine	00:08:59	00:00:43	00:26:22	00:00:27	00:16:11	00:52:39
10	Dmitry Polyanskiy	Russia	00:09:00	00:00:39	00:26:23	00:00:31	00:16:24	00:52:55
11	Igor Polyanskiy	Russia	00:08:35	00:00:38	00:26:48	00:00:32	00:16:26	00:52:56
12	Anthony Pujades	France	00:08:33	00:00:37	00:26:49	00:00:27	00:16:33	00:52:57
13	Aaron Harris	Great Britain	00:09:01	00:00:40	00:26:20	00:00:31	00:16:29	00:52:58
14	Ilya Prasolov	Russia	00:08:49	00:00:38	00:26:37	00:00:30	00:16:31	00:53:03
15	Bob Haller	Luxembourg	00:08:44	00:00:41	00:26:32	00:00:26	00:16:43	00:53:06
16	Russell White	Ireland	00:08:41	00:00:39	00:26:39	00:00:26	00:16:43	00:53:06
17	Marco Van Der Stel	Netherlands	00:08:59	00:00:41	00:26:22	00:00:29	00:16:36	00:53:06
18	David Bishop	Great Britain	00:08:57	00:00:40	00:26:24	00:00:32	00:17:00	00:53:31
19	Danilo Pimentel	Brazil	00:09:06	00:00:40	00:26:46	00:00:28	00:16:34	00:53:32
20	Matthias Steinwandter	Italy	00:09:02	00:00:40	00:26:50	00:00:28	00:16:36	00:53:34
21	Ognjen Stojanovic	Serbia	00:09:10	00:00:43	00:26:37	00:00:30	00:16:45	00:53:42
22	Javier Lluch Perez	Spain	00:09:20	00:00:39	00:26:33	00:00:26	00:16:49	00:53:45
23	Liam Lloyd	Great Britain	00:09:22	00:00:40	00:26:31	00:00:29	00:16:49	00:53:48
24	Jorik Van Egdom	Netherlands	00:09:21	00:00:41	00:26:28	00:00:29	00:16:52	00:53:49
25	Erwin Vanderplancke	Belgium	00:09:14	00:00:37	00:26:38	00:00:25	00:17:14	00:54:06
26	Henrik Klemmensen	Denmark	00:09:09	00:00:38	00:26:44	00:00:28	00:17:14	00:54:12
27	Casper Stenderup Korch	Denmark	00:08:53	00:00:40	00:26:32	00:00:34	00:17:40	00:54:17
28	Benjamin Shaw	Ireland	00:08:41	00:00:37	00:26:47	00:00:30	00:17:44	00:54:17
29	Alberto Gonzalez Garcia	Spain	00:08:48	00:00:40	00:27:06	00:00:27	00:17:25	00:54:23
30	Noah Servais	Belgium	00:09:16	00:00:42	00:26:36	00:00:28	00:17:27	00:54:27
31	Miki Taagholt	Denmark	00:09:08	00:00:42	00:26:40	00:00:28	00:17:32	00:54:28
32	Anders Lund Hansen	Denmark	00:09:51	00:00:38	00:27:29	00:00:27	00:16:26	00:54:49
33	Peter Denteneer	Belgium	00:00:00	00:00:00	00:00:00	00:00:00	00:00:00	00:55:03
34	Constantine Doherty	Ireland	00:09:40	00:00:37	00:27:42	00:00:28	00:16:42	00:55:07
35	Pierre Balty	Belgium	00:09:49	00:00:40	00:27:32	00:00:31	00:16:46	00:55:16
36	Alexey Kalistratov	Russia	00:09:19	00:00:42	00:28:00	00:00:34	00:17:09	00:55:43
37	Jan Volar	Czech Republic	00:09:08	00:00:43	00:27:44	00:00:32	00:17:45	00:55:49
38	Massimo De Ponti	Italy	00:09:17	00:00:38	00:28:06	00:00:33	00:17:27	00:55:59
39	Oliver Gorges	Luxembourg	00:09:20	00:00:39	00:28:05	00:00:25	00:18:03	00:56:30
40	Aurelien Raphael	France	00:08:34	00:00:39	00:26:47	00:00:31	00:20:02	00:56:31
41	Ruslan Terekhov	Russia	00:09:39	00:00:40	00:28:29	00:00:29	00:17:56	00:57:12
42	Dmytro Malyar	Ukraine	00:09:18	00:00:37	00:30:20	00:00:30	00:16:48	00:57:32
43	Ivan Menshykov	Ukraine	00:09:26	00:00:39	00:28:38	00:00:33	00:18:22	00:57:35
44	Daniel Canala	Australia	00:10:06	00:00:40	00:29:39	00:00:30	00:16:53	00:57:46
45	David Castro Fajardo	Spain	00:09:04	00:00:44	00:28:13	00:09:27	00:10:42	00:58:09
DNF	Mathias Lyngsø Petersen	Denmark	00:09:17	00:00:42	00:28:00	00:00:33	-	=== - ===

=== Women's race ===
Women's race results
Rank	Triathlete	Nation	Swimm	T1	Bike	T2	Run	Total time
1	Lucy Hall	Great Britain	00:09:09	00:00:43	00:28:42	00:00:33	00:18:42	00:57:48
2	Jessica Learmonth	Great Britain	00:09:08	00:00:44	00:28:44	00:00:32	00:18:44	00:57:49
3	Cassandre Beaugrand	France	00:09:33	00:00:41	00:30:07	00:00:28	00:17:45	00:58:32
4	Kaidi Kivioja	Estonia	00:10:13	00:00:41	00:29:28	00:00:29	00:18:02	00:58:52
5	Audrey Merle	France	00:09:35	00:00:45	00:30:04	00:00:30	00:18:01	00:58:54
6	Pamella Oliveira	Brazil	00:09:17	00:00:42	00:30:22	00:00:30	00:18:11	00:58:59
7	Ines Santiago Moron	Spain	00:09:36	00:00:42	00:30:05	00:00:30	00:18:10	00:59:02
8	Valentina Zapatrina	Russia	00:09:34	00:00:43	00:30:09	00:00:31	00:18:12	00:59:07
9	Heather Sellars	Great Britain	00:09:36	00:00:47	00:29:59	00:00:33	00:18:18	00:59:10
10	Giorgia Priarone	Italy	00:10:15	00:00:44	00:29:22	00:00:29	00:18:28	00:59:17
11	Sandra Dodet	France	00:09:18	00:00:45	00:30:23	00:00:31	00:18:27	00:59:22
12	Anastasia Abrosimova	Russia	00:09:12	00:00:41	00:30:31	00:00:31	00:18:38	00:59:33
13	Elena Danilova	Russia	00:09:45	00:00:42	00:29:57	00:00:31	00:18:49	00:59:43
14	Petra Kurikova	Czech Republic	00:09:42	00:00:44	00:30:01	00:00:34	00:18:49	00:59:48
15	Anna Godoy Contreras	Spain	00:09:31	00:00:44	00:30:08	00:00:32	00:19:13	01:00:05
16	Anastasia Gorbunova	Russia	00:09:23	00:00:50	00:30:16	00:00:30	00:19:13	01:00:10
17	Leonie Periault	France	00:09:44	00:00:41	00:30:01	00:00:31	00:19:26	01:00:21
18	Margot Garabedian	Cambodia	00:09:33	00:00:41	00:30:14	00:00:34	00:19:31	01:00:30
19	Maya Kingma	Netherlands	00:09:10	00:00:43	00:30:30	00:00:30	00:19:48	01:00:39
20	Cecilia Santamaria Surroca	Spain	00:00:00	00:00:00	00:00:00	00:00:00	00:00:00	01:00:47
21	Danielle De Francesco	Australia	00:09:31	00:00:45	00:30:06	00:00:31	00:20:05	01:00:56
22	Kirsten Nuyes	Netherlands	00:09:47	00:00:44	00:29:52	00:00:32	00:20:42	01:01:35
23	Marta Sanchez Hernandez	Spain	00:09:38	00:00:46	00:30:00	00:00:33	00:21:22	01:02:16
24	Arina Shulgina	Kazakhstan	00:10:07	00:00:49	00:32:13	00:00:33	00:18:54	01:02:34
25	Kseniia Levkovska	Ukraine	00:09:39	00:00:47	00:32:43	00:00:32	00:19:17	01:02:55
26	Anna Abdulova	Ukraine	00:10:27	00:00:44	00:31:58	00:00:35	00:20:32	01:04:14
27	Maryna Sokolova	Ukraine	00:09:36	00:00:46	00:32:54	00:00:36	00:22:32	01:06:23
DNF	Margaryta Krylova	Ukraine	00:10:17	00:00:49	did not finish			
DNF	Valentyna Molchanets	Ukraine	00:10:06	00:00:45	did not finish			
