= Sub7 Sub8 Project =

- Venue: Dekra Lausitzring
- Location: Klettwitz, Germany
- Distance: Swim: 2.4 mi (3.86 km); Bike: 112 mi (180.2 km); Run: 26.2 mi (42.2 km); Total: 140.6 mi (226.3 km)
- Laps: Swim: 1 Bike: Lead-in + 27; Run: 12

The Sub7 Sub8 Project (officially Pho3nix Sub7 and Sub8 Project Powered by Zwift, also stylized as Sub7/Sub8 or Sub7Sub8) was a triathlon challenge hosted by the Pho3nix Foundation with the goal of breaking the 7- and 8- hour barriers over the Iron-distance for men and women, respectively. The event was held on June 5th, 2022 in Klettwitz, Germany, with two pairs of male and female professional triathletes attempting to break the hour barriers.

The event followed a similar format to the Ineos 1:59 Challenge, which featured the use of rotating pacemakers in order for Eliud Kipchoge to break the 2-hour marathon barrier, hence making the effort ineligible for world record status. Because the Sub7 Sub8 Project was a multisport event, however, athletes would have designated pacemakers for the entirety of each segment of the race. All four athletes broke the designated hour barriers, with Kristian Blummenfelt and Kat Matthews having the fastest men's and women's times. Blummenfelt finished in 6:44:25, while Matthews finished in 7:31:54.

== Overview ==
In the weeks following the Ineos 1:59 Challenge, professional triathlete Alistair Brownlee conceptualized a test dedicated to breaking a major time barrier in triathlon, similar to the 2-hour marathon threshold. The possibility of completing an Iron-distance (140.6-mile) triathlon in under 7 hours—over half an hour faster than the men's world best at the time—was discussed.

On January 20th, 2021, sports management company Pho3nix Endurance released a video on its YouTube channel titled "DEFY THE IMPOSSIBLE," hinting at a major announcement coming on the 27th. A week later, Pho3nix released a new video announcing the Sub7 & Sub8 Project, featuring Brownlee alongside fellow professional triathletes Kristian Blummenfelt, Nicola Spirig and Lucy Charles-Barclay. The project, set to take place in the spring of 2022, would feature the four athletes attempting to break the 7-hour barrier (for men) and 8-hour barrier (for women) over the iron-distance. The Mana Sports and Entertainment Group was announced as the event organizer, promoting the challenge with the campaign "Defy the Impossible." Designed to mimic the optimized nature of the Ineos 1:59 Challenge, the event would include pacers chosen by the competitors and specialized wetsuits.

Five months later, Pho3nix Foundation announced its partnership with the Professional Triathletes Organisation (PTO) for the project. The collaboration was formed with the intention of "adding depth to the opportunities for the top echelon of athletes" and "driv[ing] engagement among younger people." Later that year, Zwift was announced as the presenting partner of the Sub7 Sub8 Project in a press release on November 24th, 2021, resulting in the project being officially renamed to be Pho3nix Sub7 and Sub8 Project Powered by Zwift, though abridged versions of the title continued to be used.

Dekra Lausitzring was announced to be the primary venue for the project in early 2022, with the event set to take place on June 5 or 6 depending on the weather. The location was chosen based on several factors including time zone, climate, wind, altitude, track surface and layout. A month later, a 9.5-hour live broadcast for the event was announced as part of a press release designating Gravity Media as the broadcast partner.

Following a stress fracture in her hip, Lucy Charles-Barclay announced her withdrawal from that season's Ironman 70.3 World Championship and the Sub8 Project on March 31, 2022. Kat Matthews was announced as her replacement 2 weeks later. Through the month of May, athlete-selected pacers for each segment of the race were announced, consisting of a mix of professional long-distance triathletes and discipline-specific specialists. Seasoned long-distance swimmers, time-trial cyclists, and marathon runners comprised the pool of non-triathlete pacers.

In the final weeks before the project, WealthConnect and BMC Bikes were announced as the Official Financial Services and Bike Course partners, respectively. On June 1st, just four days before the event, Brownlee announced his withdrawal from the event, citing a hip injury as the cause. Joe Skipper was announced as the replacement the next day, resulting in changes to the pacer group originally selected by Brownlee.

== Athletes ==
=== Competitors ===
Four athletes (two men for the Sub7 Project, two women for the Sub8 Project) were designated as competitors for the event. Joe Skipper and Kat Matthews served as the replacements for Alistair Brownlee and Lucy Charles-Barclay, respectively.

Name	Notes	Ref(s)
Alistair Brownlee	2012 London and 2016 Rio Olympic Champion, 2014 Glasgow Commonwealth Champion, 2009 and 2011 World Triathlon Series Champion, two-time Ironman 70.3 World Championship Silver Medalist	
Kristian Blummenfelt	2020 Tokyo Olympic Champion, 2021 World Triathlon Series Champion, 2021 Ironman World Champion, 2021 Iron-distance World Record (7:21:12) (Note: Current-assisted swim), 2018 70.3 World Record (3:29:04), 2019 70.3 World Record (3:25:21) (Note: Bike course short by ~4 km)	
Joe Skipper	Five-time Ironman winner: 2018, 2019, 2020, 2021 (2x). Top-10 finisher at 2018 and 2019 Ironman World Championship.	
Lucy Charles-Barclay	2021 Ironman 70.3 World Champion, three-time Ironman World Championship Runner-Up: 2017, 2018, 2019. 2018 Ironman 70.3 World Championship Runner-Up	
Kat Matthews	2021 Ironman World Championship Runner-Up, two-time Ironman winner, top-10 finisher at 2021 Ironman 70.3 World Championship.	
Nicola Spirig	Five-time Olympian, including 2012 London Gold Medal and 2016 Rio Silver Medal. Six-time European Champion, 2014 Ironman Cozumel Winner	

Withdrawal
Late Addition

=== Pacers ===
Each competitor was granted the ability to choose up to 10 maximum pacers for the project. Both of the men's pacing teams involved changes to the original roster to remain within the 10-athlete restriction prior up to the event. There was no limit to the number of pacers allocated to each discipline, and some of the athletes on the women's teams served as pacers for multiple disciplines.

==== Kristian Blummenfelt ====
Name	Discipline	Notes	Ref(s)
Lars Botellier	Swim		
Jan Hercog	Swim		
Matt Bottrill	Bike	Team manager and lead cyclist	
Axel Dopfer	Bike		
Adam Duggleby	Bike		
Chris Fennell	Bike		
Kyle Gordon	Bike		
Tom Hutchinson	Bike		
Gruff Lewis	Bike		
William Perrett	Bike		
Philip Williams	Bike		
Barnaba Kipkoech	Run		
Lani Rutto	Run	Standby run pacer; served as a support cyclist for nutrition handoffs during the run	

Removed

==== Joe Skipper ====
Name	Discipline	Notes	Ref(s)
Gordon Benson	Swim		
Alistair Brownlee	Swim	Replacement for Joe Skipper, who was originally meant to serve as a bike pacer for Brownlee	(Note: Richard Varga (Swim/Run) and Phil Sesemann (Run) were originally announced as pacers for Alistair Brownlee, but were omitted from the official roster before race day)
Max Stapley	Swim		
John Archibald	Bike		
Dan Bigham	Bike		
Alex Dowsett	Bike		
Michael Gill	Bike		
Zeb Kyffin	Bike		
Ollie Peckover	Bike		
Alex Pritchard	Bike		
Charlie Tanfield	Bike		
Harry Tanfield	Bike		
Simon Wilson	Bike		
Frank Schauer	Run	Replacement for Jonny Brownlee, who was originally meant to serve as a run pacer for Alistair Brownlee	

Removed

==== Kat Matthews ====
Name	Discipline	Notes	Ref(s)
India Lee	Swim/Bike/Run	Only athlete to serve as a pacer across all three disciplines	
Sarah-Jane Walker	Swim/Run		
Alex Clay	Bike		
Leah Dixon	Bike		
Jennifer George	Bike		
Frankie Hall	Bike		
Emily Meakin	Bike		
Kelly Murphy	Bike		
Ruth Astle	Bike/Run		
Nerys Jones	Run		

==== Nicola Spirig ====
Name	Discipline	Notes	Ref(s)
Angela Maurer	Swim		
Lucy Buckingham	Swim/Bike	Originally designated as a Bike/Run pacer on the roster; listed as a Swim/Bike pacer on race day	
Joanna Patterson	Bike		
Imogen Simmonds	Bike		
Luisa Baptista	Bike/Run		
Lizi Brooke	Bike/Run		
Melanie Maurer	Bike/Run		
Els Visser	Bike/Run		
Amelia Watkinson	Bike/Run		
Maja Neuenschwander	Run		

== Course ==
=== Swim ===
The 2.4-mile (3.86-kilometer) swim followed a point-to-point course in Lake Senftenberg, located about 6.2 miles (10 kilometers) away from the Lausitzring. The one-way nature of the course was intended to reduce the need to slow down before turn buoys, allowing for athletes to maintain constant speeds and draft more easily off of pacers.

=== Bike ===
The 112-mile (180.2-kilometer) bike began with a 10.2-mile (16.3-kilometer) lead-in segment spanning from the swim exit to the Lausitzring. Athletes would be able to take advantage of flat roads and favorable historical wind conditions during this portion, with an elevation gain of 88.6 feet (27 meters). The remainder of the cycling segment consisted of 27 laps on the Test Oval, (Note: Organizers described the rest of the bike as 27 laps of the 5.85-kilometer oval; combined with the lead-in, this yields 174.25 kilometers, while 28 laps of the course yields 180.1 kilometers.) which was renamed to the BMC Bike Course for the event. Each lap consisted of long straight stretches and turns that would not require slowing down; this also allowed for easy substitution of pacers as needed. The total elevation gain over all laps on the BMC Course was 265.7 feet (81 meters). With the inclusion of pacers—normally not permitted in long-distance triathlons—drafting was allowed, granting competitors and pacing teams the ability to ride in pacelines for the entirety of the bike.

=== Run ===
The 26.2-mile (42.2-kilometer) run consisted of 12 laps on a course confined completely within the Test Oval, with a total elevation gain of 157.5 feet (48 meters). The closed course eliminated potential external disruptions while allowing support athletes to move on and off of the track.

== Summary ==
The Sub8 and Sub7 Projects began at 7:00 AM and 8:00 AM local time, thus requiring athletes to finish before 3:00 PM to break the respective barriers.

=== Sub8 Project ===
Kat Matthews and Nicola Spirig each began the race with two pacers and goal times of 50 minutes for the swim. Spirig's team opted to swim in a triangle formation, with Angela Maurer directly in front and Lucy Buckingham to the side of Spirig. Matthews' team chose to swim in a paceline, with Sarah-Jane Walker in front followed by India Lee and Matthews right behind. Both groups stayed level over the first mile before a brief gap was opened by Spirig near the midpoint of the swim. However, a break in formation prompted Spirig's team to stretch out into a paceline, allowing Matthews to close the gap and finish with a swim time of 54:43, just 7 seconds ahead of Spirig. A current against the swim direction was reported, resulting in both women finishing nearly 5 minutes slower than the goal time.

Matthews held the lead through the lead-in portion of the bike at a pace faster than the segment goal of 29.2 mph (47 km/h). While on the Test Oval, Matthews' team periodically substituted pacers through rotating groups of riders, while Spirig chose to keep all her pacers ahead of her for the entirety of the bike section. Despite slowing down slightly in the later portion, Matthews recorded a bike time of 3:50:06, nearly 10 minutes ahead of target while lengthening her lead. Spirig finished biking with a time of 3:53:16, almost 26 minutes faster than her goal.

Through the initial stages of the run, Spirig—paced by Maja Neuenschwander—began to close the gap at a rate of 15 seconds per mile. With only 8.7 miles (14 kilometers) left, Spirig passed Matthews and her pacer, Nerys Jones. The lead was short-lived however, with Spirig slowing down and requiring additional nutrition, allowing Matthews to regain the upper hand 1.9 miles (3 kilometers) later. Spirig continued to trail behind for the remainder of the race, allowing Matthews to record a run time of 2:46:09 and finish time of 7:31:54, completing the race within a minute of her 7:31:00 goal. With a run time of 2:45:07, Spirig finished in 7:34:19 and became the second woman to break the 8-hour barrier.

=== Sub7 Project ===
Unlike Matthews and Spirig, Kristian Blummenfelt and Joe Skipper each had one pacer for the swim and goal times of 45 minutes and 49 minutes, respectively. Blummenfelt opened the swim at a faster speed alongside pacer Lars Botellier, taking an early lead over Skipper and his pacer, Alistair Brownlee. The lead continued to grow over the course of the swim, and Blummenfelt exited the swim first with a time of 48:21. Skipper emerged from the water after 53:24, with both men finishing over 3 minutes slower than their targets due to a current running against them, according to Botellier.

Blummenfelt completed the lead-in portion of the bike with a smaller group of cyclists, joining with another group the entrance of the Test Oval to form a larger pack for the remainder of the bike. On the contrary, Skipper's entire team rode from the swim exit through the lead-in and remainder of the bike, closing the gap at a rate of 20 seconds per lap. At one point, Blummenfelt clipped the back wheel of Matt Bottrill after one of the pacers ahead nearly crashed; he also experienced issues with staying within the paceline while taking nutrition. Later in the bike, Skipper's team passed Blummenfelt, culminating in a bike time of 3:16:42. This placed him well ahead of his goal of 3:20, despite one source predicting that he'd that "never hold that pace." Blummenfelt finished his bike with a time of 3:24:22, 25 minutes ahead of his target.

Skipper, paced by Frank Schauer, exited the second transition first, while Blummenfelt followed in pursuit with his pacer, Barnaba Kipkoech. During a nutrition exchange, Blummenfelt handed off a bottle to his support cyclist, Lani Rutto, who subsequently crashed. Despite the near-collision, Blummenfelt stayed upright and intercepted Skipper, regaining the lead. Blummenfelt continued onwards and eventually finished first with a run time of 2:30:50 and finish time of 6:44:25, becoming the first person to break the 7-hour barrier. Skipper recorded a 2:36:43 run and finish time of 6:47:36, stopping the clock near his goal of 6:47:00.

== Results ==
Sub8 Project
Pos.	Time (h:mm:ss)	Name	Splits			
Pos.	Time (h:mm:ss)	Name	Swim	Bike	Run	Transitions
Gold medal	7:31:54	Kat Matthews	00:54:43	3:50:06	2:46:09	00:00:56
Silver medal	7:34:19	Nicola Spirig	00:54:50	3:53:16	2:45:07	00:01:06

Sub7 Project
Pos.	Time (h:mm:ss)	Name	Splits			
Pos.	Time (h:mm:ss)	Name	Swim	Bike	Run	Transitions
Gold medal	6:44:25	Kristian Blummenfelt	00:48:21	3:24:22	2:30:50	00:00:52
Silver medal	6:47:36	Joe Skipper	00:53:24	3:16:42	2:36:43	00:00:47

== Legacy ==
In addition to the fastest Iron-distance times being recorded for both men and women, all four competitors in the event broke the respective 7- and 8-hour marks. As of 2026, no athlete has broken either barrier since.

The event generated €80,000 in donations to the Pho3nix Foundation in front of an audience of 500,000 live viewers, generating over 2 million video views across social media platforms. On July 1st, 2022, Pho3nix Foundation and Mana Group announced the "Defy the Impossible documentary," which highlighted the buildup and behind-the-scenes footage involved in the Sub7 Sub8 Project. The documentary premiered a week later across 50 platforms.

Having announced her retirement earlier in the year, Nicola Spirig finished her triathlon career at the end of the 2022 season. A few years after the Sub8 Project, Kat Matthews went on to set the world record for an Ironman-branded race, finishing the 2025 Ironman Texas in 8:10:34. Following years of his 7:21:12 Iron-distance record being the center of debate due to a current-aided swim, Kristian Blummenfelt recorded a time of 7:21:24 at the 2026 Ironman Texas without a down current. Months after the Sub7 Project, Joe Skipper recorded his highest-ever finish at an Ironman World Championship, earning 5th place at the 2022 edition.
