= 2021 World Triathlon Cup =

World Triathlon Cup

Series details
- Races: 6

Men's World Cup
- Most wins: 1: six athletes

Women's World Cup
- Most wins: 2: Beth Potter (GBR)

World Triathlon Cup
← 2020	2022 →

The 2021 World Triathlon Cup was the 31st season of the World Triathlon Cup, the second-tier international series for triathlon, and the first following the international governing body's rebrand from the International Triathlon Union (ITU) to World Triathlon. It was the first series held under the new World Triathlon Cup branding.

Continuing to be disrupted by travel restrictions and local health measures stemming from the COVID-19 pandemic, the season featured six completed rounds between May and October 2021, opening in Lisbon on 22–23 May and concluding with back-to-back events in South Korea (Haeundae and Tongyeong) on 23 and 30 October.

== Effect of covid pandemic ==
Several planned races on the 2021 calendar were cancelled or postponed due to the pandemic. Early-season stops scheduled for New Plymouth and Miyazaki in March were cancelled outright, while Huatulco was postponed from its original April date to June so that it could serve as the final event of the Tokyo 2020 Olympic qualification window, which itself had been postponed a year. Later in the season, planned rounds in Osaka (May) and Weihai (September) were cancelled, and a rescheduled autumn edition in Miyazaki (23–24 October) was postponed.

=== Cancelled events ===
Original date	Venue	Country	Reason
20–21 March	Miyazaki	Japan	COVID-19 pandemic (regional travel restrictions)
27–28 March	New Plymouth	New Zealand	COVID-19 pandemic (border closures and travel restrictions)
8–9 May	Osaka	Japan	COVID-19 pandemic
25–26 September	Weihai	China	COVID-19 pandemic
23–24 October	Miyazaki	Japan	COVID-19 pandemic (postponed)

== Results ==
=== Men ===
Event	Location	Gold	Silver	Bronze
22 May	Lisbon, (Portugal)	Kristian Blummenfelt; Norway	Max Studer; Switzerland	Genis Grau; Spain
29 May	Arzachena, (Italy)	Jonathan Brownlee; Great Britain	Adrien Briffod; Switzerland	Mario Mola; Spain
13 June	Huatulco, (Mexico)	Tyler Mislawchuk; Canada	Manoel Messias; Brazil	Miguel Hidalgo; Brazil
12 September	Karlovy Vary, (Czech Republic)	Lasse Nygaard Priester; Germany	Grant Sheldon; Great Britain	Csongor Lehmann; Hungary
23 October	Haeundae, (South Korea)	Anthony Pujades; France	Takumi Hojo; Japan	Nicola Azzano; Italy
30 October	Tongyeong, (South Korea)	Jawad Abdelmoula; Morocco	Alessio Crociani; Italy	Sergio Baxter Cabrera; Spain

=== Women ===
Event	Location	Gold	Silver	Bronze
23 May	Lisbon, (Portugal)	Nicola Spirig; Switzerland	Carolyn Hayes; Ireland	Kirsten Kasper; United States
29 May	Arzachena, (Italy)	Marlene Gomez-Islinger; Germany	Julie Derron; Switzerland	Verena Steinhauser; Italy
12 June	Huatulco, (Mexico)	Alberte Kjær Pedersen; Denmark	Kirsten Kasper; United States	Lisa Perterer; Austria
12 September	Karlovy Vary, (Czech Republic)	Julie Derron; Switzerland	Ai Ueda; Japan	Bianca Seregni; Italy
23 October	Haeundae, (South Korea)	Beth Potter; Great Britain	Kate Waugh; Great Britain	Zsanett Bragmayer; Hungary
30 October	Tongyeong, (South Korea)	Beth Potter; Great Britain	Kate Waugh; Great Britain	Sandra Dodet; France

== Medal table ==
2021 World Triathlon Cup medal table
Rank	Nation	Gold	Silver	Bronze	Total
1	Great Britain	3	3	0	6
2	Switzerland	2	3	0	5
3	Germany	2	0	0	2
4	France	1	0	1	2
5	Canada	1	0	0	1
5	Denmark	1	0	0	1
5	Morocco	1	0	0	1
5	Norway	1	0	0	1
9	Japan	0	2	0	2
10	Italy	0	1	3	4
11	Brazil	0	1	1	2
11	United States	0	1	1	2
13	Ireland	0	1	0	1
14	Spain	0	0	3	3
15	Hungary	0	0	2	2
16	Austria	0	0	1	1
Totals (16 entries)		12	12	12	36

== Multi-medalists ==
Only Beth Potter of Great Britain won multiple races, taking two legs of the competition, but a number of female athletes stepped on the podium multiple times during the truncated season - no male athlete did so.

Rank	Athlete	Gold	Silver	Bronze	Total
1	Beth Potter (GBR)	2	0	0	2
2	Julie Derron (SUI)	1	1	0	2
3	Kate Waugh (GBR)	0	2	0	2
4	Kirsten Kasper (USA)	0	1	1	2
