= Azerbaijan at the 2019 World Beach Games =

- Flag of Azerbaijan
- IOC code: AZE

in Doha, Qatar 12 October 2019 – 16 October 2019
- Medals Ranked 17th: Gold 0 Silver 4 Bronze 1 Total 5

World Beach Games appearances
- 2019; 2023

Azerbaijan competed at the inaugural World Beach Games in Doha, Qatar from 12 to 16 October 2019. In total, athletes representing Azerbaijan won four silver medals and one bronze medal. The country finished in 17th place in the medal table.

== Medal summary ==
Medals by sport
Sport	1st place, gold medalist(s)	2nd place, silver medalist(s)	3rd place, bronze medalist(s)	Total
Aquathlon	0	2	1	3
Beach wrestling	0	2	0	2

=== Medalists ===
Medal	Name	Sport	Event
Silver	Kseniia Levkovska	Aquathlon	Women's individual
Silver	Kseniia Levkovska; Rostyslav Pevtsov	Aquathlon	Mixed relay
Silver	Panah Ilyasli	Beach wrestling	Men's 70 kg
Silver	Ibrahim Yusubov	Beach wrestling	Men's 80 kg
Bronze	Rostyslav Pevtsov	Aquathlon	Men's individual
