= Antonio Serrat =

Spanish triathlete (born 1995)

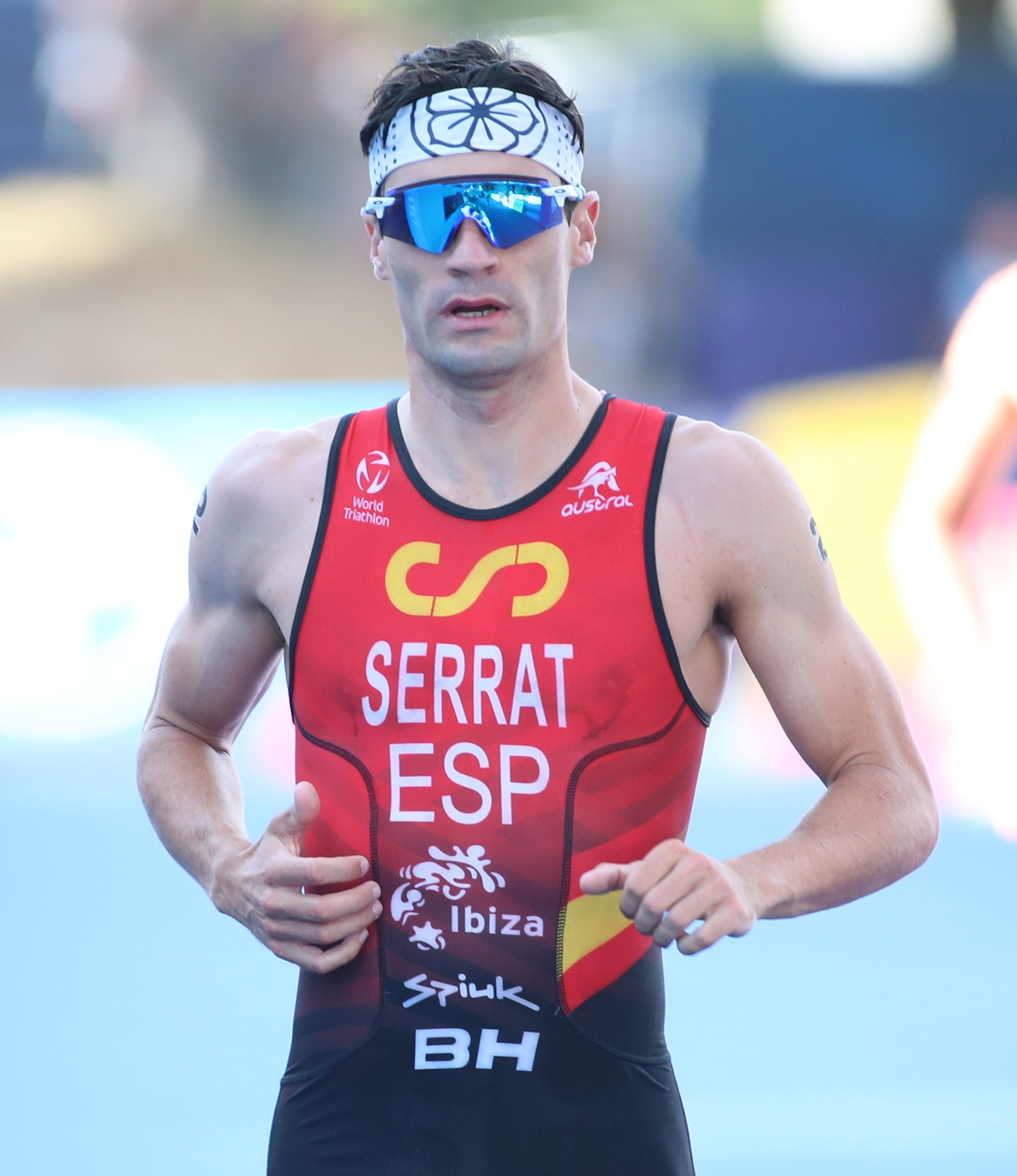
- Serrat in 2022

Personal information
- Full name: Antonio Serrat Seoane
- Born: 24 January 1995 (age 31) Vigo, Spain

Sport
- Country: Spain
- Sport: Triathlon
Medal record
Representing Spain
Men's triathlon
European Championships
Bronze medal – third place	2021 Valencia	Elite
European Sprint Championships
Silver medal – second place	2021 Kitzbühel	Elite
Men's duathlon
World Championships
Bronze medal – third place	2025 Pontevedra	Elite

Antonio Serrat Seoane (born 24 January 1995) is a Spanish triathlete.

He won a bronze medal at the 2021 European Triathlon Championships and a silver medal at the 2021 Europe Triathlon Sprint Championships. In 2022, he finished 7th overall in the 2022 World Triathlon Championship Series, also placing second in Bermuda. The year before, he placed 8th overall, but had no podium finishes. In 2024, he finished 32nd in the men's triathlon at the Summer Olympics.
