= 2020 ITU Triathlon World Cup =

World Triathlon Cup

Series details
- Races: 4

Men's World Cup
- Most wins: 3: Vincent Luis (FRA)

Women's World Cup
- Most wins: 2: Flora Duffy (BER)

World Triathlon Cup (formerly ITU Triathlon World Cup)
← 2019	2021 →

The 2020 ITU Triathlon World Cup was a series of triathlon races. The competition represented the second tier of season-long draft-legal standard distance racing organised by the International Triathlon Union (ITU) for elite-level triathletes, below the 2020 ITU World Triathlon Series which crowned the season-long world champion. There were four races held in a season heavily compromised by the covid pandemic.

== Effect of covid pandemic ==
The 2020 ITU Triathlon World Cup was significantly impacted by the COVID-19 pandemic, which forced the cancellation or postponement of the vast majority of scheduled events. Of the four events that survived, three only did so after being rescheduled.

Original date	Venue	Country	Reason for cancelation
15–16 February	Cape Town	South Africa	Financial difficulties of the local organising committee
21–22 March	Sarasota	United States	COVID-19 pandemic
28–29 March	New Plymouth	New Zealand	COVID-19 pandemic
3–5 April	Brasília	Brazil	COVID-19 pandemic
25–26 April	Huatulco	Mexico	COVID-19 pandemic
9–10 May	Chengdu	China	COVID-19 pandemic (rescheduled to 19–20 September before cancellation)
23–24 May	Osaka	Japan	Downgraded to Asian Cup in January 2020; later cancelled due to COVID-19
20–21 June	Antwerp	Belgium	Withdrawal of local municipal government support
4–5 July	Tiszaújváros	Hungary	COVID-19 pandemic
12–13 September	Weihai	China	COVID-19 pandemic
17–18 October	Tongyeong	South Korea	COVID-19 pandemic
24–25 October	Miyazaki	Japan	COVID-19 pandemic

== Results ==
=== Men ===
Event	Location	Gold	Silver	Bronze
14 March	Mooloolaba, (Australia)	Ryan Sissons; New Zealand	Hayden Wilde; New Zealand	Luke Willian; Australia
13 September	Karlovy Vary, (Czech Republic)	Vincent Luis; France	Vasco Vilaça; Portugal	Jelle Geens; Belgium
10 October	Arzachena, (Italy)	Vincent Luis; France	Kristian Blummenfelt; Norway	Alistair Brownlee; Great Britain
7 November	Valencia, (Spain)	Vincent Luis; France	Alistair Brownlee; Great Britain	Jelle Geens; Belgium

=== Women ===
Event	Location	Gold	Silver	Bronze
14 March	Mooloolaba, (Australia)	Vicky Holland; Great Britain	Georgia Taylor-Brown; Great Britain	Ashleigh Gentle; Australia
13 September	Karlovy Vary, (Czech Republic)	Flora Duffy; Bermuda	Georgia Taylor-Brown; Great Britain	Maya Kingma; Netherlands
10 October	Arzachena, (Italy)	Flora Duffy; Bermuda	Beth Potter; Great Britain	Verena Steinhauser; Italy
7 November	Valencia, (Spain)	Beth Potter; Great Britain	Nicola Spirig; Switzerland	Lisa Tertsch; Germany

== Medal table ==
2020 ITU Triathlon World Cup medal table
Rank	Nation	Gold	Silver	Bronze	Total
1	France	3	0	0	3
2	Great Britain	2	4	1	7
3	Bermuda	2	0	0	2
4	New Zealand	1	1	0	2
5	Norway	0	1	0	1
5	Portugal	0	1	0	1
5	Switzerland	0	1	0	1
8	Australia	0	0	2	2
8	Belgium	0	0	2	2
10	Germany	0	0	1	1
10	Italy	0	0	1	1
10	Netherlands	0	0	1	1
Totals (12 entries)		8	8	8	24

== Multiple medalists ==
The following athletes achieved more than one podium across the season.

Rank	Athlete	Gold	Silver	Bronze	Total
1	Vincent Luis (FRA)	3	0	0	3
2	Flora Duffy (BER)	2	0	0	2
3	Beth Potter (GBR)	1	1	0	2
4	Georgia Taylor-Brown (GBR)	0	2	0	2
5	Alistair Brownlee (GBR)	0	1	1	2
6	Jelle Geens (BEL)	0	0	2	2
