= Triathlon at the 2024 Summer Olympics – Men's =

Men's triathlon at the Games of the XXXIII Olympiad
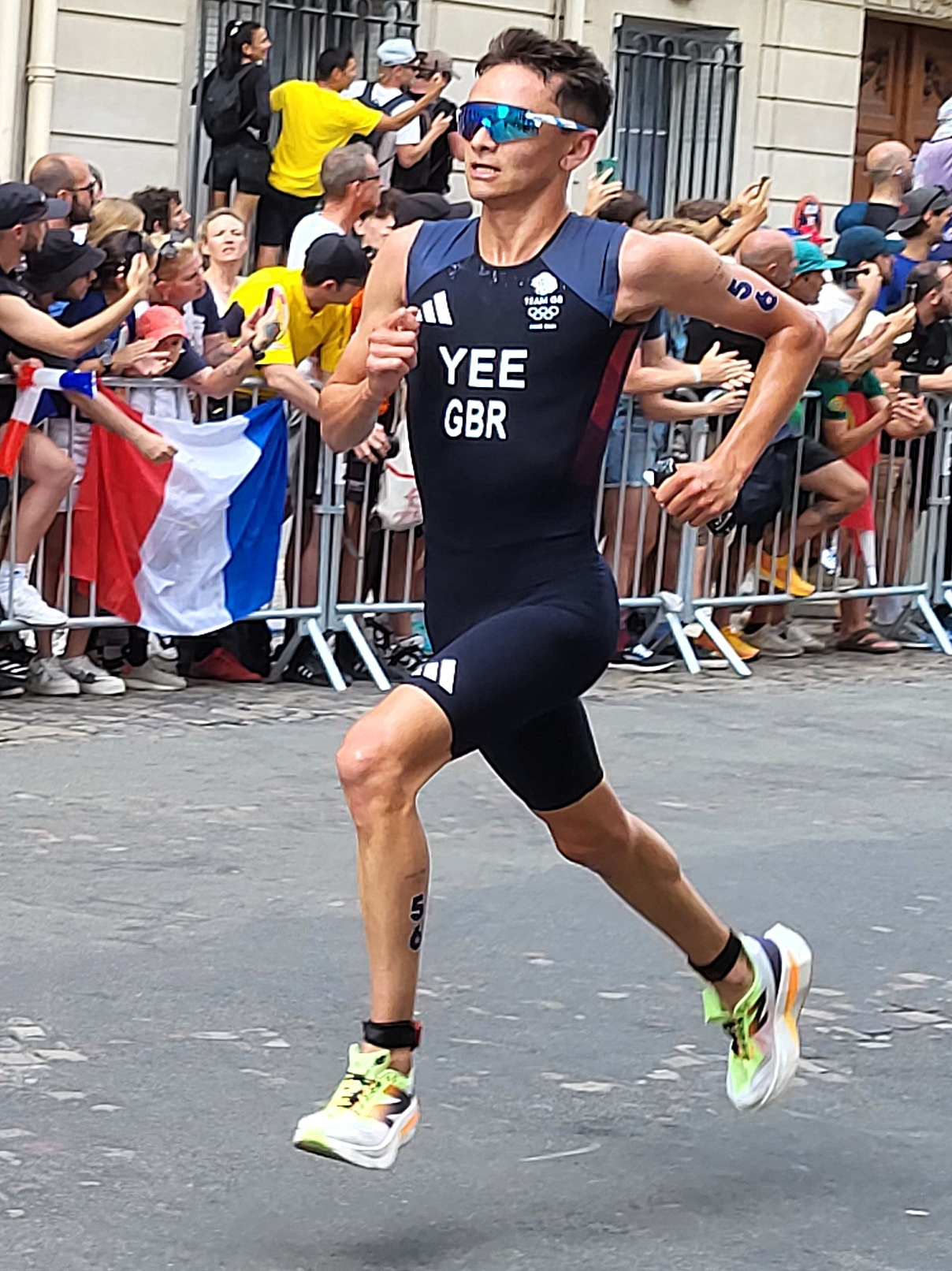
- Gold medallist Alex Yee during the race
- Date: 31 July 2024
- Competitors: 55 from 31 nations

Medalists
1st place, gold medalist(s)		Alex Yee	Great Britain
2nd place, silver medalist(s)		Hayden Wilde	New Zealand
3rd place, bronze medalist(s)		Léo Bergère	France

The men's triathlon at the 2024 Summer Olympics took place on 31 July 2024. Alex Yee of Great Britain won the gold medal, with Hayden Wilde of New Zealand and Léo Bergère of France taking silver and bronze, respectively. Kristian Blummenfelt of Norway, the gold medallist at the 2020 Olympics, finished in 12th place, failing to defend his gold medal. All three of the 2020 Olympic men's individual medallists - Yee, Wilde and Blummenfelt, took part in the event.

The event was initially scheduled to be held on 30 July, but was postponed for a day due to the water quality of the Seine river.

== Results ==
Rank	#	Triathlete	Nation	Swimming	Cycling	Running	Total time	Difference
1st place, gold medalist(s)	56	Alex Yee	Great Britain	20:37	51:57	29:47	1:43:33	
2nd place, silver medalist(s)	21	Hayden Wilde	New Zealand	21:13	51:20	29:49	1:43:39	+0:06
3rd place, bronze medalist(s)	27	Léo Bergère	France	20:37	51:55	29:55	1:43:43	+0:10
4	29	Pierre Le Corre	France	20:20	52:14	30:01	1:43:51	+0:18
5	48	Vasco Vilaça	Portugal	21:03	51:30	30:04	1:43:56	+0:23
6	47	Ricardo Batista	Portugal	21:10	51:29	30:06	1:43:58	+0:25
7	45	Matthew Hauser	Australia	20:14	52:26	30:24	1:44:17	+0:44
8	15	Alberto González García	Spain	20:23	52:15	30:35	1:44:22	+0:49
9	49	Tyler Mislawchuk	Canada	20:49	51:45	30:35	1:44:25	+0:52
10	25	Miguel Hidalgo	Brazil	20:57	51:36	30:36	1:44:27	+0:54
11	53	Csongor Lehmann	Hungary	21:19	51:16	30:43	1:44:27	+0:54
12	43	Kristian Blummenfelt	Norway	21:00	51:29	30:39	1:44:27	+0:54
13	50	Charles Paquet	Canada	21:16	51:16	30:46	1:44:37	+1:04
14	3	Gianluca Pozzatti	Italy	20:31	52:01	30:51	1:44:41	+1:08
15	18	Kenji Nener	Japan	20:36	51:58	31:13	1:45:02	+1:29
16	52	Bence Bicsák	Hungary	20:55	51:35	31:21	1:45:14	+1:41
17	44	Vetle Bergsvik Thorn	Norway	20:30	52:02	31:34	1:45:21	+1:48
18	36	Tim Hellwig	Germany	20:34	52:03	31:39	1:45:29	+1:56
19	20	Dylan McCullough	New Zealand	20:36	51:58	31:44	1:45:35	+2:02
20	33	Henri Schoeman	South Africa	20:11	52:24	32:02	1:45:53	+2:20
21	37	Lasse Lührs	Germany	21:00	51:34	32:03	1:45:56	+2:23
22	12	Marten Van Riel	Belgium	20:34	51:53	32:22	1:46:11	+2:38
23	42	Alois Knabl	Austria	20:33	51:57	32:33	1:46:23	+2:50
24	38	Jonas Schomburg	Germany	20:32	52:00	32:41	1:46:26	+2:53
25	32	Jamie Riddle	South Africa	20:29	52:02	33:16	1:47:15	+3:42
26	6	Mitch Kolkman	Netherlands	20:39	51:58	33:31	1:47:21	+3:48
27	28	Dorian Coninx	France	20:18	52:17	33:49	1:47:37	+4:04
28	34	Diego Moya	Chile	21:05	51:31	33:54	1:47:47	+4:14
29	31	Seth Rider	United States	20:30	52:00	34:03	1:47:53	+4:20
30	2	Alessio Crociani	Italy	20:10	52:32	34:24	1:48:19	+4:46
31	30	Morgan Pearson	United States	21:30	54:35	31:04	1:48:26	+4:53
32	17	Antonio Serrat Seoane	Spain	22:03	53:57	31:26	1:48:42	+5:09
33	41	Tjebbe Kaindl	Austria	21:21	51:18	35:08	1:49:01	+5:28
34	4	Matthew Wright	Barbados	22:13	53:50	32:02	1:49:18	+5:45
35	40	Emil Holm	Denmark	22:26	53:37	32:04	1:49:21	+5:48
36	16	Roberto Sánchez Mantecon	Spain	23:02	54:28	30:45	1:49:29	+5:56
37	5	Shachar Sagiv	Israel	21:31	54:33	32:13	1:49:32	+5:59
38	35	Gaspar Riveros	Chile	22:14	53:47	32:29	1:49:48	+6:15
39	8	Crisanto Grajales	Mexico	21:24	54:34	32:45	1:50:02	+6:29
40	23	Max Studer	Switzerland	22:24	53:36	32:51	1:50:07	+6:34
41	19	Makoto Odakura	Japan	21:36	54:24	32:55	1:50:15	+6:42
42	11	Jelle Geens	Belgium	23:13	54:16	31:47	1:50:35	+7:02
43	1	Rostyslav Pevtsov	Azerbaijan	21:33	56:01	31:42	1:50:36	+7:03
44	7	Richard Murray	Netherlands	22:43	54:48	32:11	1:50:55	+7:22
45	26	Manoel Messias	Brazil	23:08	54:21	32:07	1:51:00	+7:27
46	46	Luke Willian	Australia	22:09	53:40	34:05	1:51:13	+7:40
47	9	Aram Peñaflor	Mexico	23:07	54:27	32:56	1:51:46	+8:13
48	14	Tyler Smith	Bermuda	21:39	54:16	34:42	1:51:59	+8:26
49	22	Adrien Briffod	Switzerland	21:30	54:30	35:06	1:52:21	+8:48
50	54	Felix Duchampt	Romania	23:05	56:35	35:00	1:56:00	+12:27
	55	Samuel Dickinson	Great Britain	20:52	51:43	Did not finish		
	24	Jawad Abdelmoula	Morocco	22:29	Lapped			
	39	Jason Ng Tai Long	Hong Kong	24:06	Did not finish			
	10	Jean Gaël Laurent L'Entete	Mauritius	25:10	Lapped			
	51	Eloi Adjavon	Togo	25:43	Lapped			
Sources: Official Results
