= Ran Sagiv =

Israeli triathlete (born 1997)

Ran Sagiv רן שגיב
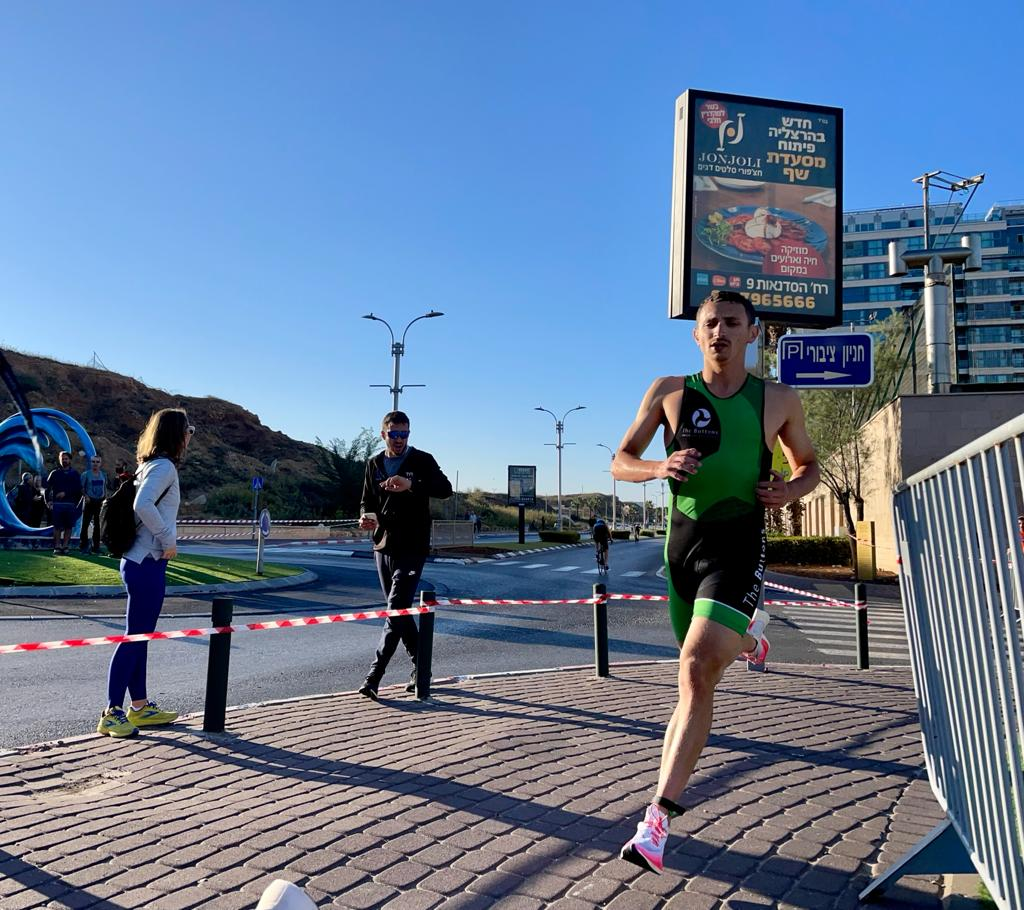
- Sagiv in 2022

Personal information
- Born: 25 March 1997 (age 29) Zichron Yaakov, Israel
- Parent: Shemi Sagiv, Olympic marathoner (father)
- Relative(s): Shachar Sagiv, Olympic triathlete (brother)

Sport
- Sport: Triathlon
- Coached by: Uri Zilberman (national coach)
Medal record
Representing Israel
Men's triathlon
World Triathlon U23 Championships
Bronze medal – third place	2019 Lausanne	Individual

Ran Sagiv (Hebrew: רן שגיב; born 25 March 1997) is an Israeli Olympic triathlete. He won the bronze medal in the 2019 World Triathlon U23 Championships. Sagiv competed in the men's triathlon at the 2020 Summer Olympics in Tokyo in 2021, coming in 35th.

== Early and personal life ==
Sagiv is a native of Zichron Yaakov, Israel. His father is Shemi Sagiv (at the time known as Sabag), who represented Israel as a marathon runner at the 1984 Summer Olympics in Los Angeles, studied medicine, and is now a chiropractor, and his mother Rachela is a special education consultant. His father is his biggest inspiration. For his bar mitzvah, his father took him to London to see the 2012 Summer Olympics; in later years, his father was his coach.

His brother Shachar Sagiv, who is three years older than Ran, is also a triathlete Olympian, and came in 20th in triathlon in the Tokyo Olympics held in 2021. Shachar said of him: "We encourage each other and we always support each other; we also fight, like all brothers." His brother Shachar will represent Israel at the 2024 Summer Olympics in Paris in the Men's triathlon at Pont Alexandre III on 30 July 2024.

His younger brother is named Tomer.

He studied at the Open University, where he graduated with a BA in Political Science and International Relations, and served in the Israel Defense Forces 8th Army at the Wingate Institute as an "outstanding athlete".

== Career ==
=== 2014–20; bronze medal in European U23 Championships ===
Sagiv won the gold medal in the 2014 Israel Triathlon Junior National Sprint Championships, in a time of 57:15.

Sagiv won the bronze medal in the 2015 Kupiškis European Triathlon Union (ETU) Triathlon Junior European Cup in Lithuania in 59:32 as he came in second in the run with a time of 16:23, the bronze medal in the 2015 Tiszaujvaros ETU Triathlon Junior European Cup in Hungary in 37:48, and the bronze medal in the 2015 Alanya ETU Triathlon Junior European Cup in Turkey in 55:46 as he came in second in the run with a time of 16:17. He also won the bronze medal in the European Championship round in Hungary in 2015.

He won the gold medal in the 2016 Bled ETU Triathlon Junior European Cup in Slovenia in 35:00, in a competition that had 63 competitors. Sagiv also won the 2016 Israel Triathlon National Junior Championships in Eilat, Israel, in 57:27. In April 2017, he won the Tel Aviv Triathlon with a time of 59:58 minutes.

Sagiv came in fourth in the 2018 Eilat ETU Triathlon U23 European Championships in Israel in 1:54:38, 19 seconds behind gold medal winner Max Studer, as he came in second in the run with a time of 31:44.

Sagiv won the bronze medal in the 2019 International Triathlon Union (ITU) World Triathlon U23 Championships in Lausanne, Switzerland, in 1:50:50, as he came in first in the bike with a time of 58:07. He also came in fourth in the 2019 Karlovy Vary ITU Triathlon World Cup in the Czech Republic, in a competition that had 66 competitors, with a time of 1:56:52.

In March 2020, competing in the World Cup in Mooloolaba, Australia, Sagiv was in the middle of a peloton multi-cyclist crash, and suffered both a fractured jaw and a fractured chin.

=== 2021–22; Tokyo Summer Olympics ===
Sagiv competed in the men's event at the 2020 Summer Olympics in Tokyo in 2021, coming in 35th out of 51 competitors, in hot and humid weather, a little less than two minutes after his brother who came in 20th. His older brother Shachar remarked: "My obligation as an older brother was to take care of my little brother and take him everywhere, so I also took him to the Olympics." The race consisted of a 1.5-kilometer swim, followed by a 40-kilometer bike race, and then finally a 10-kilometer run. He and Shachar, who came in 20th, were the first siblings to compete together for Team Israel since brothers Ran Shantal and Nir Chantal, who represented Israel in the Men's 470 Sailing in the 1996 Olympics in Atlanta, Georgia, in the United States.

He won the gold medal in the 2021 Israel Sprint Triathlon National Championships in Herzliya, Israel, with a time of 1:00:45.

Commenting on his approach to the triathlon, Sagiv said: "The goal is to give as much as possible and reach the finish line when there is nothing left to give. Collapsing on the line."

Sagiv decided to retire from competing in triathlon in September 2022, at 25 years of age.
