= Pevtsov =

Pevtsov (Russian: Певцов, from певец meaning singer) is a Russian masculine surname, its feminine counterpart is Pevtsova. It may refer to

- Dmitry Pevtsov (born 1963), Russian actor and singer
- Rostyslav Pevtsov (born 1987), Azerbaijani triathlete
