= João Pedro Silva (triathlete) =

Portuguese triathlete

João Silva
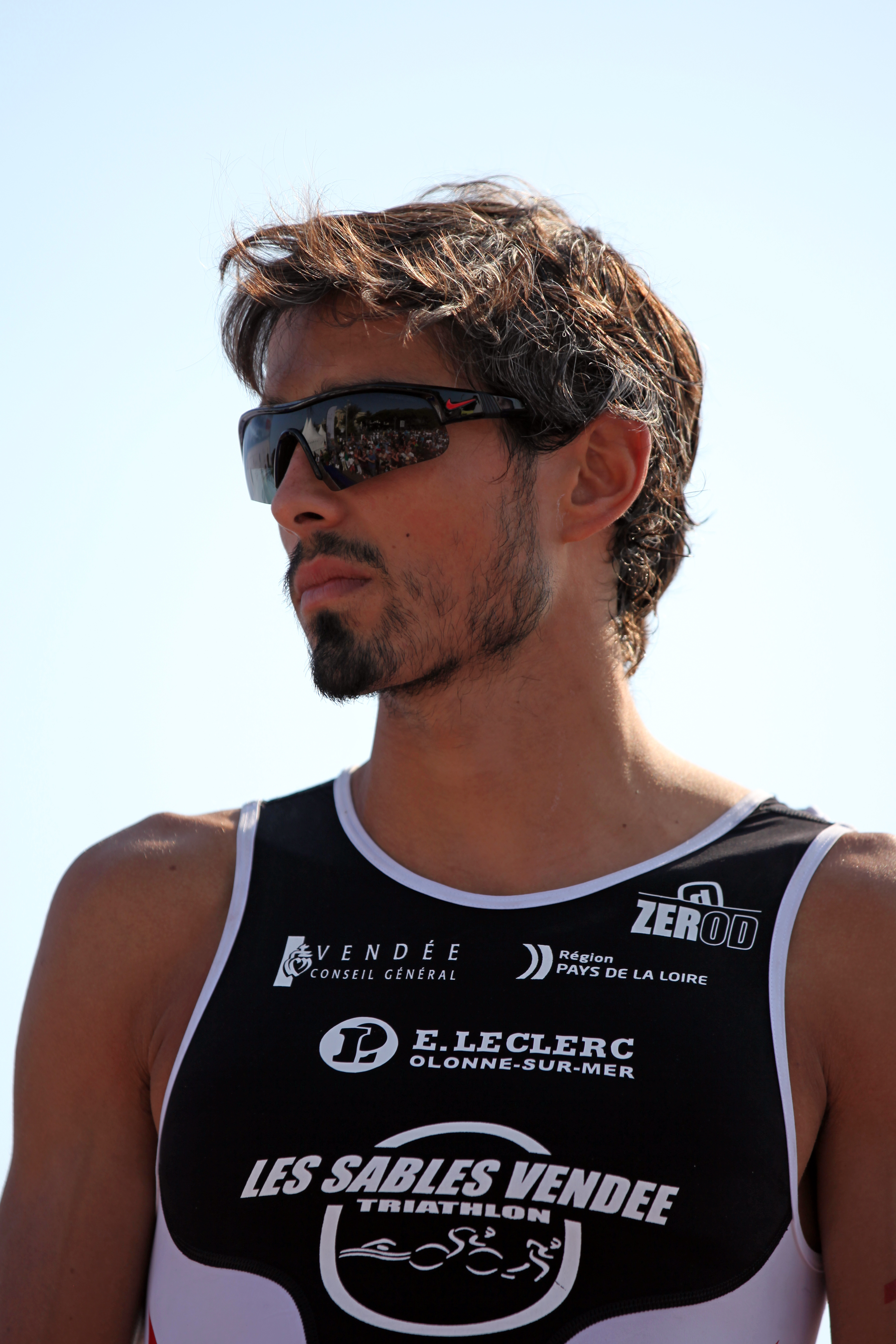
- João Silva at the Grand Final of the Grand Prix de Triathlon in Nice, 2012

Personal information
- Full name: João Pedro Lopes da Silva
- Born: 15 May 1989 (age 37) Benedita, Portugal

Sport
- Country: Portugal
- Sport: Triathlon
- Club: S.L. Benfica
Medal record
Representing Portugal
Men's triathlon
European Games
Silver medal – second place	2015 Baku	Triathlon
Europe Triathlon Championships
Bronze medal – third place	2017 Kitzbühel	Individual
Europe Triathlon Sprint Championships
Bronze medal – third place	2017 Düsseldorf	Individual

João Pedro Lopes da Silva (born 15 May 1989) is a Portuguese professional triathlete. He was the European Under-23 Champion in 2008, 2010 and 2011, National Junior Champion in 2006 and 2007 and the National Under-23 Champion in 2008. At the 2012 Summer Olympics Silva placed 9th thus becoming the most decorated male triathlete in Portuguese history. On 23 January 2013, Silva joined S.L. Benfica's triathlon team. He won the silver medal at the 2015 European Games in Baku.

== Career ==
Silva was born in Benedita, Alcobaça, Portugal. At the age of seventeen Silva won his first medals at Junior World Championships and in the same year he started to take part in and to achieve top ten positions at Elite competitions.

At the World Championship Series and World Triathlon Series triathlons in Yokohama he won the gold medals in 2011 and 2012. In 2012 he also represented Portugal at the London Olympics and placed 9th.

In France, Silva takes part in the prestigious Club Championship Series Grand Prix de Triathlon. At the Grand Final in Nice, he placed 3rd in the individual ranking and 1st in the club ranking. His club Les Sables Vendee Tri is also the French Club Champion of the year 2012.

Silva studies medicine at the Universidade Nova de Lisboa.

=== ITU Competitions ===
In the ten years from 2003 to 2012, Silva took part in 60 ITU competitions and achieved 26 top ten positions. The following list is based upon the official ITU Athlete's Page. Unless indicated otherwise the following competitions are triathlons and belong to the Elite category.

Date	Competition	Place	Rank
2006-04-23	European Cup	Estoril	DNF
2006-09-02	World Championships (Junior)	Lausanne	3
2006-10-07	Duathlon European Championships (Junior)	Rimini	2
2006-10-28	Premium European Cup	Eilat	5
2007-01-21	Pan American Cup	La Paz	DNF
2007-01-28	Pan American Cup	Villarrica	28
2007-05-06	BG World Cup	Lisbon	61
2007-05-19	Duathlon World Championships (Junior)	Gyor	5
2007-06-03	BG World Cup	Madrid	DNF
2007-06-16	Duathlon European Championships (Junior)	Edinburgh	1
2007-06-29	European Championships (Junior)	Copenhagen	3
2007-07-21	European Championships (U23)	Kuopio	37
2007-08-30	BG World Championships (Junior)	Hamburg	8
2007-09-09	Premium European Cup	Kedzierzyn Kozle	11
2007-10-07	BG World Cup	Rhodes	17
2007-11-04	BG World Cup	Cancun	40
2007-12-01	BG World Cup	Eilat	DNF
2008-03-30	BG World Cup	Mooloolaba	DNF
2008-04-06	BG World Cup	New Plymouth	45
2008-04-19	Premium European Cup	Pontevedra	36
2008-05-10	European Championships (Junior)	Lisbon	2
2008-06-05	BG World Championships (Junior)	Vancouver	14
2008-09-06	European Championships (U23)	Pulpí	1
2008-09-27	Duathlon World Championships (Junior)	Rimini	20
2009-04-05	European Cup	Quarteira	15
2009-05-02	Dextro Energy World Championship Series	Tongyeong	46
2009-05-17	Premium European Cup	Pontevedra	DNF
2009-06-20	European Championships (U23)	Tarzo Revine	15
2009-07-02	European Championships	Holten	30
2009-09-09	Dextro Energy World Championship Series, Grand Final (U23 World Championship)	Gold Coast	DNF
2009-09-26	Duathlon World Championships (U23)	Concord	7
2010-04-11	European Cup	Quarteira	2
2010-04-18	World Cup	Monterrey	1
2010-05-08	Dextro Energy World Championship Series	Seoul	22
2010-06-05	Dextro Energy World Championship Series	Madrid	7
2010-07-03	European Championships	Athlone	4
2010-07-17	Dextro Energy World Championship Series	Hamburg	10
2010-07-24	Dextro Energy World Championship Series	London	11
2010-08-14	Dextro Energy World Championship Series	Kitzbuhel	7
2010-08-28	European Championships (U23)	Vila Nova de Gaia (Porto)	1
2010-09-08	Dextro Energy World Championship Series, Grand Final	Budapest	4
2011-04-09	Dextro Energy World Championship Series	Sydney	8
2011-06-04	Dextro Energy World Championship Series	Madrid	27
2011-06-24	European Championships	Pontevedra	DNF
2011-07-16	Dextro Energy World Championship Series	Hamburg	5
2011-08-06	Dextro Energy World Championship Series	London	20
2011-08-20	Sprint World Championships	Lausanne	8
2011-09-09	Dextro Energy World Championship Series, Grand Final	Beijing	27
2011-09-19	Dextro Energy World Championship Series	Yokohama	1
2011-10-09	World Cup	Huatulco	7
2011-10-28	European Championships (U23)	Eilat	1
2012-03-31	European Cup	Quarteira	43
2012-04-20	European Championships	Eilat	25
2012-05-10	World Triathlon Series	San Diego	52
2012-08-04	Olympic Games	London	9
2012-08-25	World Triathlon Series	Stockholm	18
2012-09-01	European Championships (U23)	Aguilas	14
2012-09-29	World Triathlon Series	Yokohama	1
2013-04-07	World Triathlon Series	Auckland	3
2013-04-20	World Triathlon Series	San Diego	3
2015-06-14	European Games	Baku	2

BG = the sponsor British Gas · DNF = did not finish · DNS = did not start

== Notes ==
Awards
Preceded by Nelson Évora	Portuguese Sportsman of the Year; 2010	Succeeded by Hélder Rodrigues
Preceded by None	Portuguese Young Promise; 2006	Succeeded by João Moutinho
