= Roberto Sánchez Mantecón =

Spanish triathlete

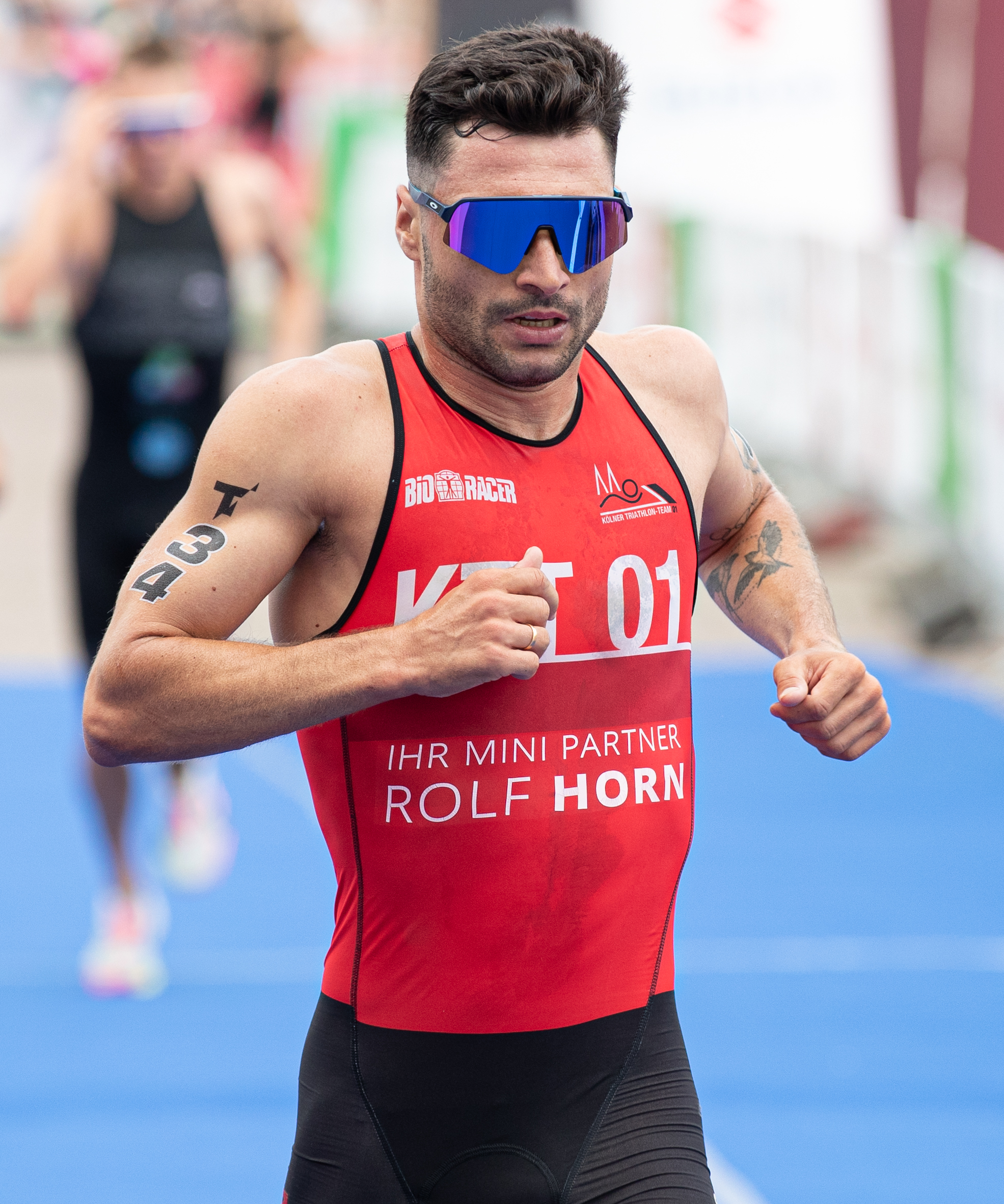
- Sánchez at Die Finals – Dresden 2005

Personal information
- Born: 14 February 1996 (age 30) Mislata, Spain

Sport
- Country: Spain
- Sport: Triathlon
Medal record
Men's triathlon
Representing Spain
Europe Triathlon Championships
Silver medal – second place	2021 Valencia	Individual
Europe Triathlon Sprint Championships
Bronze medal – third place	2018 Tartu	Individual

Roberto Sánchez Mantecón (born 14 February 1996) is a Spanish triathlete.

He won a silver medal at the 2021 European Triathlon Championships and a bronze medal at the 2018 Europe Triathlon Sprint Championships. In 2024, he finished 36th in the men's triathlon at the Summer Olympics.
