= 2021 European Triathlon Championships =

2021 European Championships
- Location: Valencia, Spain
- Dates: 25–26 September

The 2021 European Triathlon Championships was held in Valencia, Spain from 25 May to 26 September 2021.

== Medal overview ==
Event	Gold	Silver	Bronze
Men	Dorian Coninx; France	Roberto Sánchez Mantecón; Spain	Antonio Serrat Seoane; Spain
Women	Julie Derron; Switzerland	Annika Koch; Germany	Sian Rainsley; Great Britain

== Medal table ==
* Host nation (Spain)

Rank	Nation	Gold	Silver	Bronze	Total
1	France (FRA)	1	0	0	1
1	Switzerland (SUI)	1	0	0	1
3	Spain (ESP)*	0	1	1	2
4	Germany (GER)	0	1	0	1
5	Great Britain (GBR)	0	0	1	1
Totals (5 entries)		2	2	2	6
