= Mehdi Essadiq =

Moroccan triathlete

Personal information
- Nationality: Moroccan
- Born: 31 May 1986 (age 38)

Sport
- Sport: Triathlon

Mehdi Essadiq (born 31 May 1986) is a Moroccan triathlete, who has represented his country in international competitions. He competed in the men's event at the 2020 Summer Olympics.
