= Alessio Crociani =

Italian triathlete

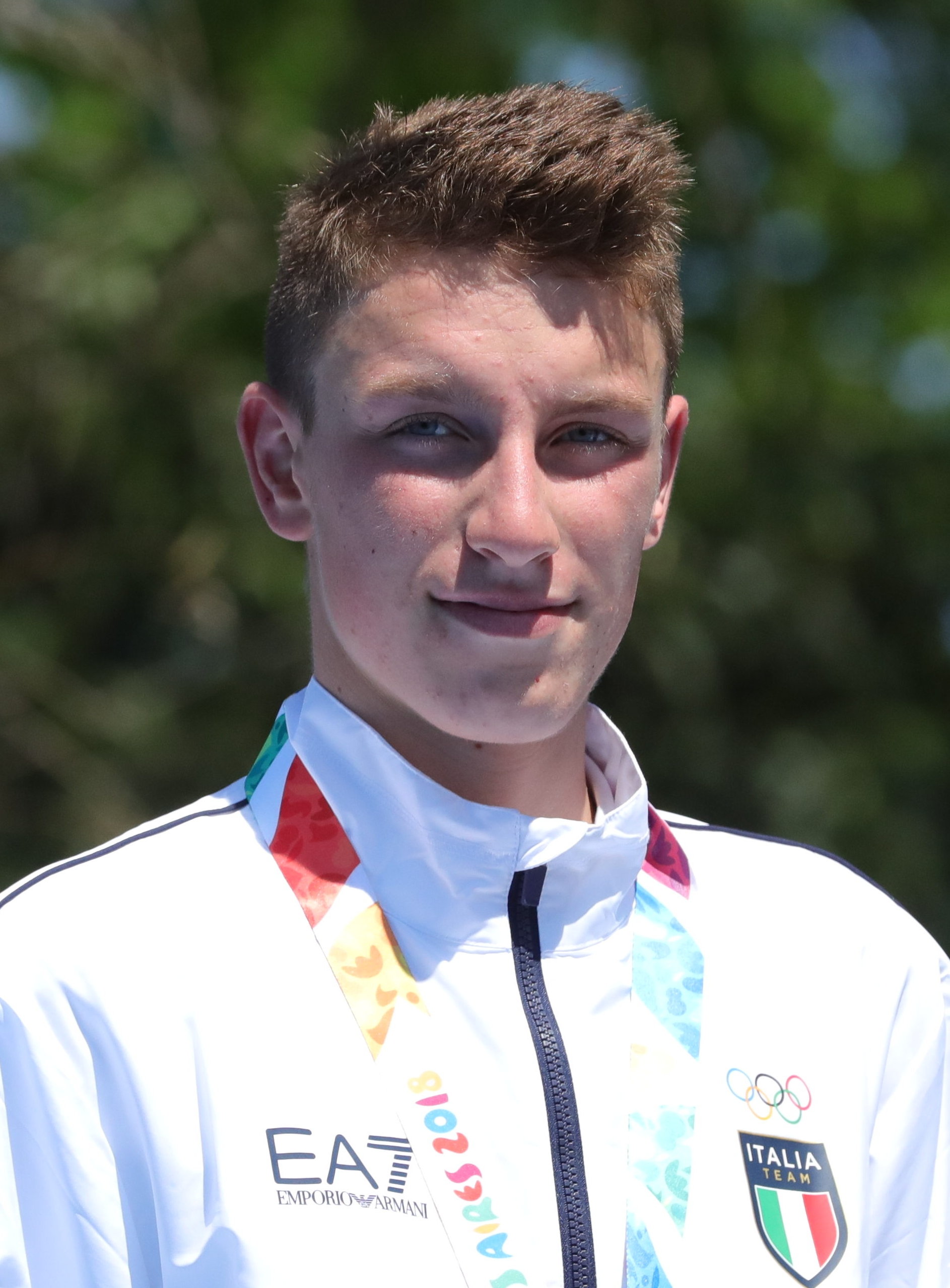
- Crociani at the 2018 Summer Youth Olympics

Personal information
- Nationality: Italian
- Born: 19 November 2001 (age 24) Rimini, Italy
- Height: 192
- Weight: 70

Sport
- Country: Italy
- Sport: Triathlon

Achievements and titles
- Olympic finals: Paris 2024
- Highest world ranking: 7^ World Series Ranking 2025
Medal record
Men's triathlon
Representing Italy
World Championship Series
Bronze medal – third place	2025 Wollongong	Elite
Bronze medal – third place	2025 Hamburg	Elite
European Sprint Championships
Gold medal – first place	2025 Melilla	Elite
Gold medal – first place	2025 Melilla	Mixed Relay

Alessio Crociani (born 19 November 2001) is an Italian triathlete competing in short course and middle distance worldwise events.

Alessio Crociani finished 7^ in the World Triathlon Championship Series ranking in 2025. Bronze medal at the 2025 World Championship Final and Bronze medal in the 2025 World Triathlon Championship Series Hamburg. Won the 2025 Europe Triathlon Sprint Championships in Melilla, Spain. He also finished in 30th place in the men's triathlon at the 2024 Summer Olympics.
