= Gordon Benson =

British triathlete (born 1994)

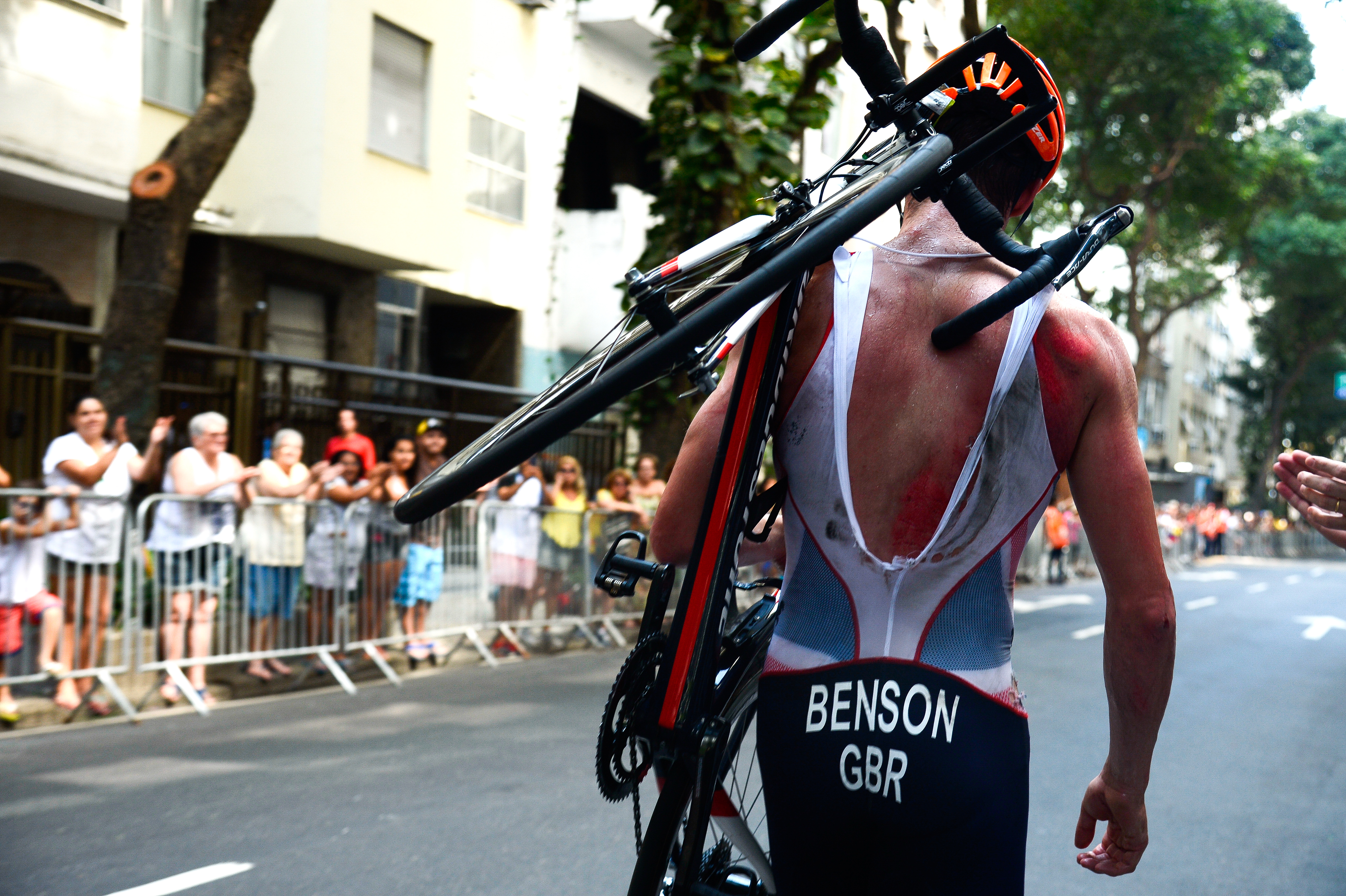

Personal information
- Nationality: England
- Born: 12 May 1994 (age 32) Halifax, West Yorkshire, England
Medal record
Representing Great Britain
Men's triathlon
European Games
Gold medal – first place	2015 Baku	Triathlon
World Triathlon Championships
Gold medal – first place	2014 Edmonton	U-23 Team
Bronze medal – third place	2014 Edmonton	U-23 Individual
European Triathlon Championships
Gold medal – first place	2014 Penza	U-23 Individual
Europe Triathlon Sprint Championships
Gold medal – first place	2019 Kazan	Individual
Australian Youth Olympic Festival
Bronze medal – third place	2013 Sydney	Relay
Men's Athletics
European Youth Olympic Festival
Silver medal – second place	2011 Trabzon	3000m

Gordon Benson (born 12 May 1994 in Halifax, West Yorkshire) is a professional British triathlete. He won the gold medal at the 2015 European Games in Baku, the first medal ever won at the European Games by Great Britain.

Gordon Benson is a member of the UK Sport Lottery Funded British Triathlon Podium Potential Squad. He is based in Leeds, where he grew up. He was educated at Leeds Grammar School and is currently reading Nutrition at the University of Leeds.

He was voted the British Triathlon Male Elite Junior Triathlete of the Year 2011 and 2012.

In June 2015, he competed in the inaugural European Games, for Great Britain in men's triathlon. He earned a gold medal. The following month he was part of the British team that took the bronze medal at the ITU Triathlon Mixed Relay World Championships in Hamburg.

Benson had represented Great Britain in athletics at the junior level, having won the silver medal in the 3000 metres at the 2011 European Youth Summer Olympic Festival.
