= Felix Duchampt =

Romanian triathlete (born 1989)

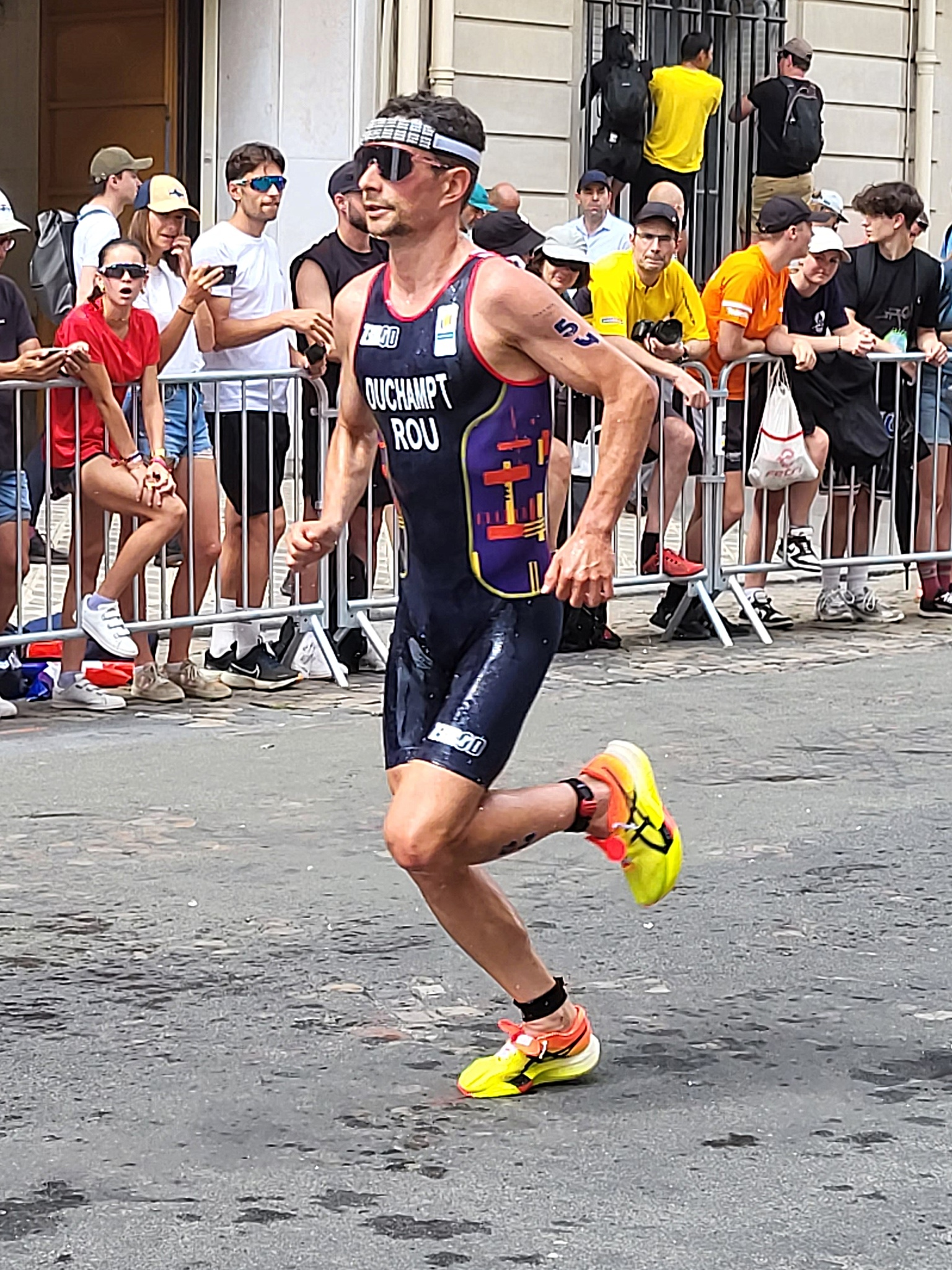
- Felix Duchampt 2024

Personal information
- Nationality: Romanian
- Born: 5 September 1989 (age 35); Clermont-Ferrand, France

Sport
- Sport: Triathlon

Felix Duchampt (born 5 September 1989) is a Romanian triathlete. He competed in the men's event at the 2020 Summer Olympics.

Duchampt ran for the Queens Royals track and field and cross country teams, where he was an All-American in cross country running.
