= Petra Kuříková =

Czech triathlete (born 1991)

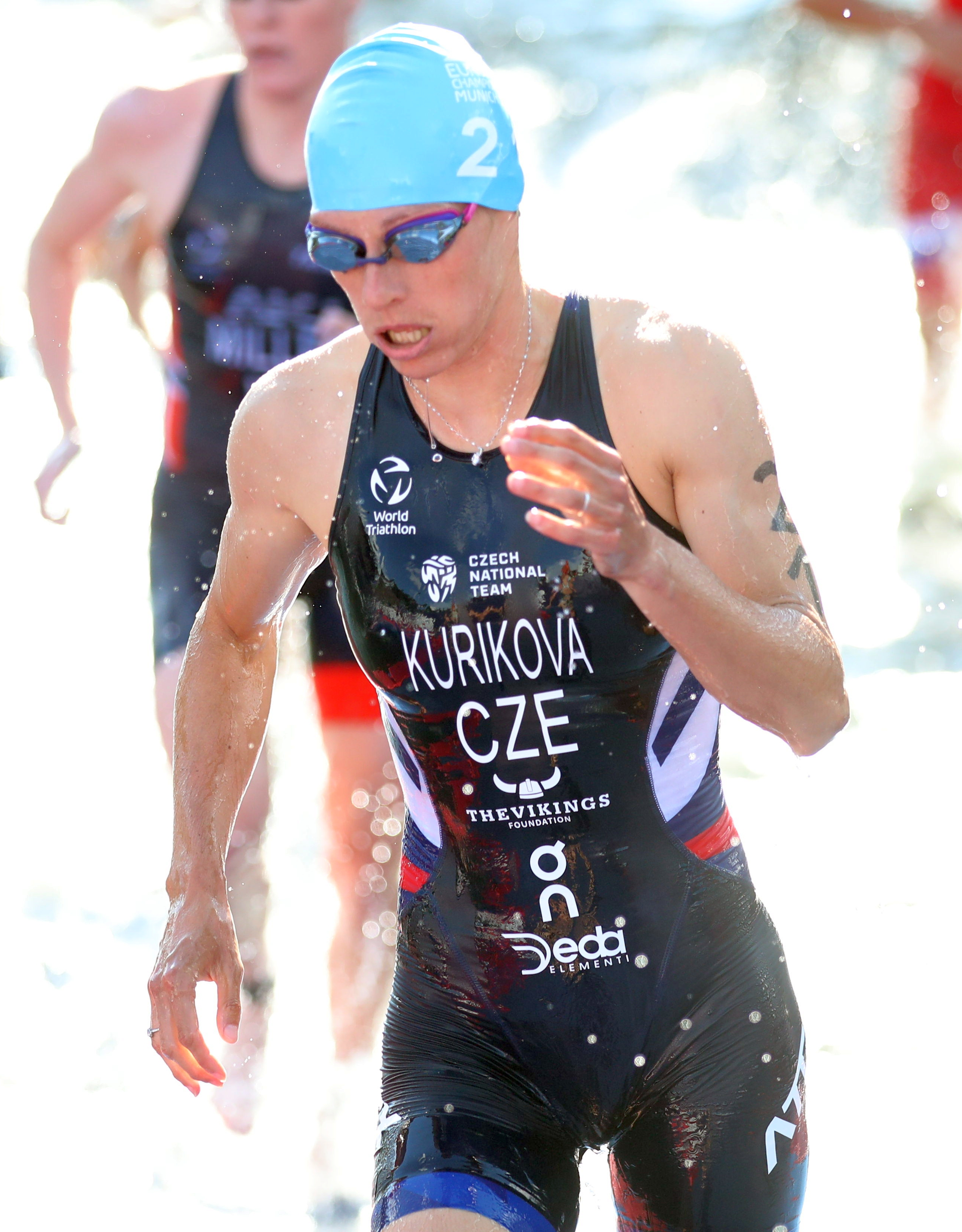

Personal information
- Nationality: Czech
- Born: 25 November 1991 (age 33); Jablonec nad Nisou, Czech Republic

Sport
- Sport: Triathlon

Petra Kuříková (born 25 November 1991) is a Czech triathlete. She competed in the women's event at the 2020 Summer Olympics. She competed in the women's triathlon at the 2024 Summer Olympics in Paris, France.
