= Jean-François Berthet =

French yacht racer

Personal information
- Born: 23 August 1969 (age 57) France

Sailing career
- Sport: Sailing
Medal record
Sailing
Representing France
World Championships
Silver medal – second place	1993 Crozon-Morgat, France	470
Bronze medal – third place	1988 Lake of Thun	420
Gold medal – first place	1987 Lake Balaton	420

Jean-François Berthet (born 23 August 1969) is a French yacht racer who competed in the 1996 Summer Olympics.

== Career ==
With his brother Gwenaël Berthet, he won a bronze medal at the 470 European Championships in 1989 in Balatonfüred.
