= Triathlon at the 2015 European Games =

- Venue: Ramada (start)
- Dates: 13–14 June
- Competitors: 105 from 36 nations

The triathlon competitions at the 2015 European Games, in Baku, were held on 13 and 14 June 2015. A total of 105 athletes, 57 men and 48 women, competed.

== Qualification ==
A maximum of 12 NOCs may qualify three athletes per event. Other NOCs may have a maximum of two quota places per event. Three quota places will be allocated to the first 12 nations to have three athletes eligible through the qualification process.

== Olympic qualification ==
Triathlon is one of the events where performance in the 2015 Games impact on Olympic Qualification. In the case of triathlon, the winner of each event will secure a quota place for their NOC for the 2016 Summer Olympics.

== Medalists ==
Event	Gold	Silver	Bronze
Men's	Gordon Benson; Great Britain	João Silva; Portugal	Rostyslav Pevtsov; Azerbaijan
Women's	Nicola Spirig; Switzerland	Rachel Klamer; Netherlands	Lisa Nordén; Sweden

== Medal table ==
Rank	Nation	Gold	Silver	Bronze	Total
1	Great Britain (GBR)	1	0	0	1
1	Switzerland (SUI)	1	0	0	1
3	Netherlands (NED)	0	1	0	1
3	Portugal (POR)	0	1	0	1
5	Azerbaijan (AZE)	0	0	1	1
5	Sweden (SWE)	0	0	1	1
Totals (6 entries)		2	2	2	6

== Participating nations ==
A total of 105 athletes from 36 nations competed in triathlon at the 2015 European Games:

- Austria (1)
- Azerbaijan (3)
- Belgium (4)
- Belarus (1)
- Bulgaria (2)
- Croatia (3)
- Czech Republic (5)
- Denmark (1)
- Spain (5)
- Estonia (2)
- Finland (1)
- France (4)
- Great Britain (4)
- Germany (2)
- Greece (3)
- Hungary (5)
- Ireland (3)
- Israel (3)
- Italy (5)
- Latvia (1)
- Lithuania (1)
- Luxembourg (1)
- Malta (3)
- Netherlands (2)
- Norway (3)
- Poland (5)
- Portugal (5)
- Romania (2)
- Russia (6)
- Slovenia (2)
- Serbia (1)
- Switzerland (2)
- Slovakia (4)
- Sweden (1)
- Turkey (3)
- Ukraine (6)
