= Russell White (triathlete) =

Irish triathlete

Personal information
- Nationality: Irish
- Born: 4 June 1992 (age 33) Banbridge, Northern Ireland

Sport
- Sport: Triathlon

Russell White (born 4 June 1992) is an Irish triathlete. He competed in the men's event at the 2020 Summer Olympics.
