= Shachar Sagiv =

Israeli triathlete (born 1994)

Shachar Sagiv שחר שגיב
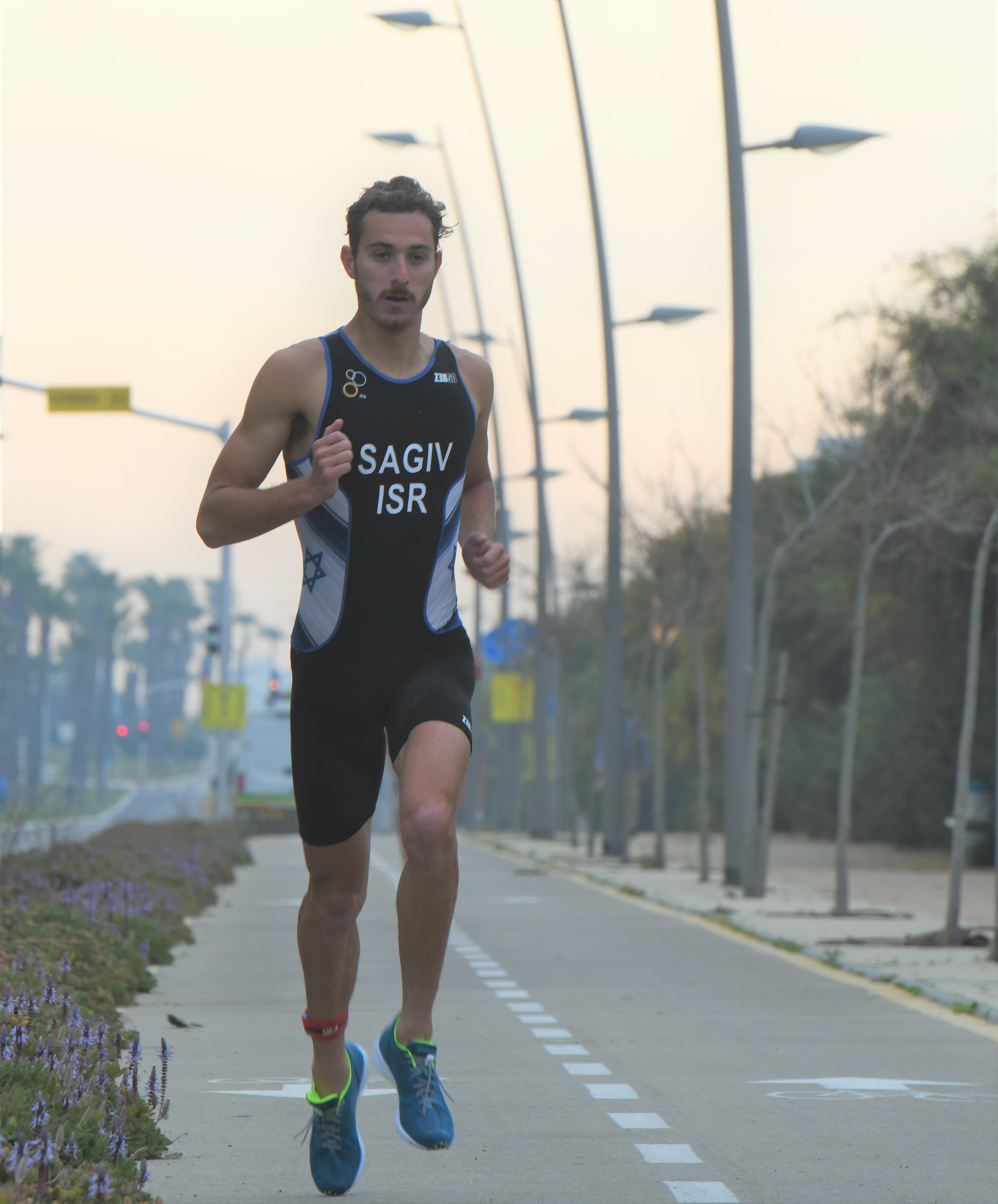

Personal information
- Born: 11 October 1994 (age 32) Haifa, Israel
- Home town: Zikhron Ya'akov, Israel
- Height: 182 cm (6 ft 0 in)
- Father: Shemi Sagiv, Olympic marathoner
- Relatives: Ran Sagiv, Olympic triathlete (brother)

Sport
- Sport: Triathlon
- Club: Maccabi Tel Aviv
- Coached by: Lior Cohen
Medal record
Representing Israel
Men's triathlon
European Games
| Silver medal – second place | 2023 Kraków-Małopolska | Individual |
Super League Triathlon
| Silver medal – second place | 2022 Malibu | Eliminator |
U23 European Triathlon Championships
| Bronze medal – third place | 2016 Burgas | Individual |

Shachar Sagiv (Hebrew: שחר שגיב; born 11 October 1994) is an Israeli Olympic triathlete. In 2016, he won the bronze medal in the U23 European Triathlon Championships. Sagiv competed in the men's triathlon at the 2020 Summer Olympics in 2021, coming in 20th. He won a silver medal in the 2023 European Games. Sagiv represented Israel at the 2024 Paris Olympics in the Men's triathlon.

== Early life ==
Sagiv was born in Haifa, Israel, and lived in Zikhron Ya'akov, 22 miles (35 km) south of Haifa, and now lives in Ra'anana, Israel. His father is Shemi Sagiv (at the time known as Sabag), who represented Israel as a marathon runner at the 1984 Summer Olympics in Los Angeles, studied medicine, and is now a chiropractor, and his mother Rachela is a special education consultant.

His brother Ran Sagiv, who is three years younger, also competed in triathlon in the Olympics, and came in 35th in triathlon in the Tokyo Olympics held in 2021. He said of Ran: "We encourage each other and we always support each other; we also fight, like all brothers." He has a younger brother.

For his bar mitzvah, his father took him to France to watch the Tour de France bicycle competition for a week. When he was 15 years old, Sagiv moved to Israel's Wingate Institute in Netanya, and attended high school while he trained. He attended Hof HaSharon High School. During his required military service with the Israel Defense Forces he served in a special unit that allowed him to continue training and traveling to compete, while he also coached soldiers in special fighter units in power lifting and running. He is 182 cm (6 ft 0 in) tall.

== Career ==
Sagiv focused first on the biathlon at age 7, a 300-meter run, 3-kilometer ride, and another 300-meter run, and then ran his first triathlon when he was 8 years old, after he was encouraged by his father. He focused on triathlon over other sports at 15 years of age.

He races in Super League Triathlon, which he was invited to participate in after the Tokyo Olympics. His coach until 2021 was his father; his coach since then has been Lior Cohen, and his club is Maccabi Tel Aviv. He trains between 25 and 30 hours a week.

=== 2012–16 ===
In October 2012, Sagiv won the gold medal in the 2012 Alanya European Triathlon Union (ETU) Junior European Cup in Alanya, Turkey, in the sprint triathlon competition (750-meter swim, 20-km bike, 5-km run) with a time of 53:31. In June 2013, he won the silver medal in the 2013 Kupiskis ETU Triathlon Junior European Cup in Kupiskis, Lithuania, with a time of 57:30. In November 2013, he won the silver medal in the 2013 Israel Triathlon National Championships with a time of 2:05:26. In 2013 he was ranked 15th in the world for his age.

In October 2014, he won the silver medal in the 2014 Loutraki ETU Triathlon European Cup and Mediterranean Championships in Loutraki, Greece, with a time of 54:43. In December 2014, Sagiv won the bronze medal in the 2014 Israel Triathlon National Championships in Eilat, Israel, in a time of 1:55:19. In December 2015, he won the 2015 Israel Triathlon National Championships in Eilat in a time of 2:08:25.

In June 2016, Sagiv won the bronze medal in the 2016 Burgas ETU Triathlon U23 European Championships in Burgas, Bulgaria, with a time of 59:57. In December 2016, he won the 2016 Israel Triathlon National Championships in Eilat with a time of 1:52:02.

=== 2020 Tokyo Olympics ===
Sagiv competed in the men's triathlon at the 2020 Summer Olympics in 2021, coming in 20th out of 51 competitors with a time of 1:47:10 (and 12th in the bicycle, with a time of 56:14) in hot and humid weather, as his younger brother came in a little less than two minutes later. Shachar remarked: "My obligation as an older brother was to take care of my little brother and take him everywhere, so I also took him to the Olympics." The race consisted of a 1.5-kilometer swim, followed by a 40-kilometer bike race, and then finally a 10-kilometer run. They were the first siblings to compete together for Team Israel since brothers Ran Shantal and Nir Chantal, who represented Israel in the Men's 470 Sailing in the 1996 Olympics in Atlanta, Georgia, in the United States.

=== 2021–22 ===
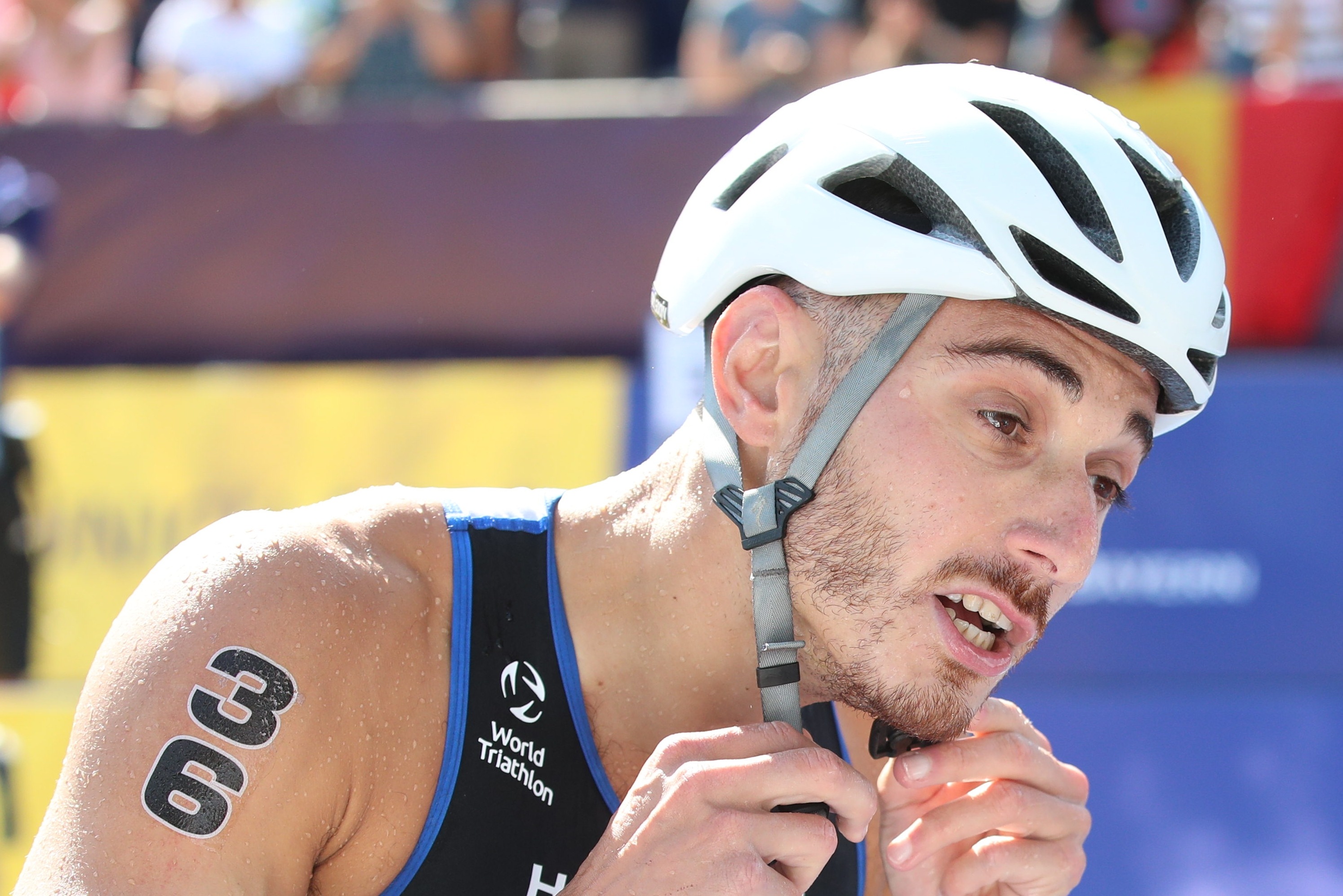
Sagiv at the 2022 European Championships

In April 2021, Sagiv won the bronze medal in the 2021 Europe Triathlon Cup Melilla in Melilla, Spain, with a time of 49:17, five seconds behind the gold medal winner. In May 2021 he was ranked 12th among male triathletes worldwide.

In 2022, he won his first Super League Triathlon (SLT) podium at SLT Malibu 2022 in California, with a silver medal.

In May 2022, Sagiv won the bronze medal in the 2022 Europe Triathlon Cup Caorle in Caorle, Italy, with a time of 51:23. In October 2022, he became the first Israeli athlete to compete in Saudi Arabia, as he competed in the Super League Neom triathlon; after suffering a fall, he finished the competition in 9th place.

=== 2023–24 ===
Most of 2023, Sagiv suffered from a hamstring injury. In April 2023, Sagiv won the gold medal in the 2023 Israel Sprint Triathlon National Championships in Tiberias, Israel, with a time of 55:10.

In June 2023 he won the silver medal in the 2023 Kraków-Malopolska European Games triathlon in Kraków-Malopolska, Poland, with a time of 1:46:51, one second behind Norwegian gold medal winner Vetle Bergsvik Thorn.

In February 2024, he came in 4th in the World Triathlon Cup held in Napier, New Zealand, with a time of 49:50 minutes, one second behind third place.

=== 2024 Paris Olympics ===
Sagiv represented Israel at the 2024 Paris Olympics in the Men's triathlon, and came in 37th out of 55 competitors. In August 2023, he competed in a pre-Olympic competition in Paris to become familiar with the Olympic course, and said: "I know what will happen; it is already imagined in my head." Commenting on the Gaza war, he said: "it's hard for me to be happy with what I'm doing, when I know that my friends and even my partner are still in the reserves, fighting for us. But this is my role in the world, to represent Israel ... in the best possible way ... this is bigger than the personal goals that have accompanied me until today."

Looking forward, he said he hopes to compete in the 2028 Summer Olympics in Los Angeles, the city in which his father competed in the Olympics for Israel in 1984. As he puts it: "I need to close a circle with my father."
