= Gwenaël Berthet =

French yacht racer (born 1970)

Gwenaël Berthet (born 4 August 1970) is a French yacht racer who competed in the 1996 Summer Olympics.
