= Kseniia Levkovska =

Ukrainian triathlete (born 1989)

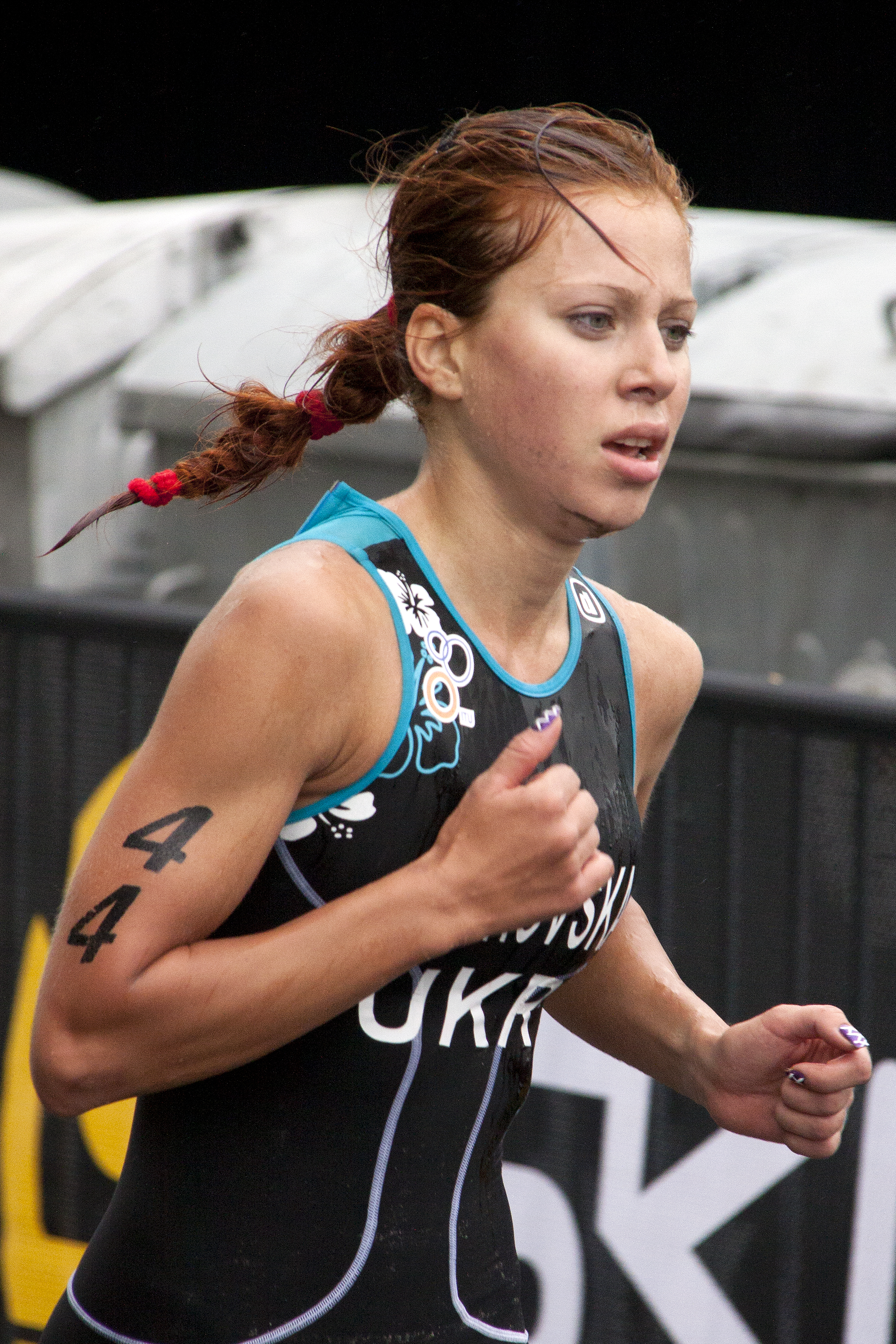
Kseniia Levkovska at the U23 World Championship triathlon in Budapest, 2010.

Kseniia Levkovska (Ukrainian: Ксенія Левковська; patronymic: Юріївна; born 13 October 1989 in Kharkiv) is a Ukrainian professional triathlete.

Levkovska earned the title Master of Sports and placed fifth at the Ukrainian (Elite) Championships of the year 2010. At the Ukrainian Summer Games in Yelistratova's hometown Zhytomir Levkovska placed third (U23) behind Yuliya Yelistratova and Victoria Kachan. At the Ukrainian Police Championship 2010 Levkovska placed 3rd, at the European Police Championships 2010 in Kitzbühel, however, having the best swimming time, she was disqualified because of a missing running lap.

Levkovska represents the club of her hometown Spartak (Спартак).

In the last three years she has taken part in five ITU competitions and her name is included in the Women Olympic Ranking London 2012.

== ITU Competitions ==
The following list is based upon the official ITU rankings and the Athlete's Profile Page. Unless indicated otherwise, the following events are triathlons (Olympic Distance) and belong to the Elite category.

Date	Competition	Place	Rank
2008-09-07	Premium European Cup	Kedzierzyn Kozle	17
2009-08-30	Premium European Cup	Kedzierzyn Kozle	21
2010-06-27	Premium European Cup	Brasschaat	19
2010-08-08	World Cup	Tiszaújváros	50
2010-09-08	Dextro Energy World Championship Series, Grand Final: U23 World Championship	Budapest	29
2011-06-26	Premium Asian Cup	Burabay	4
2011-07-10	Asian Cup	Kokshetau	3
