= Triathlon at the 2020 Summer Olympics – Men's =

Men's triathlon at the Games of the XXXII Olympiad
- Venue: Odaiba Marine Park, Tokyo
- Date: 26 July 2021
- Competitors: 51 from 29 nations
- Winning time: 1:45:04

Medalists
1st place, gold medalist(s)		Kristian Blummenfelt	Norway
2nd place, silver medalist(s)		Alex Yee	Great Britain
3rd place, bronze medalist(s)		Hayden Wilde	New Zealand

The men's triathlon at the 2020 Summer Olympics took place at the Odaiba Marine Park in Tokyo on 26 July 2021.

The race began with a false start, as a media boat blocked about a third of the field from entering the water. After the restart, the field remained close together coming out of the water. In the cycling leg, a group of 10 broke away for the first few laps but the chasing pack eventually reeled them by the end of the fifth lap to form a lead group of 37 triathletes. On the last lap, Andrea Salvisberg broke away solo to lead by 16 seconds heading into the second transition, but he was caught by the rest of the field on the first lap of the running leg. The lead group remained together until the end of the third lap, when Alex Yee, Kristian Blummenfelt, and Hayden Wilde surged ahead. In the final mile, Blummenfelt accelerated away from the other two to take the gold medal. Yee finished 11 seconds later to take the silver, with Wilde completing the podium a further nine seconds back.

== Course ==
The event took place at the Odaiba Marine Park and was 51.5 kilometres (32.0 mi) long along a flat course. Competitors began with a 1.5-kilometre (0.93 mi) swimming leg, consisting of a 950-metre (3,120 ft) lap followed by a shorter 550-metre (1,800 ft) lap. Then, they took on the 40-kilometre (25 mi) cycling leg, made of eight laps of a 5-kilometre (3.1 mi) course. Finally, competitors finished with four 2.5-kilometre (1.6 mi) laps that made up the 10-kilometre (6.2 mi) running leg.

== Results ==
Rank	#	Triathlete	Nation	Swimming	Cycling	Running	Total time	Difference
1st place, gold medalist(s)	43	Kristian Blummenfelt	Norway	18:04	56:19	29:34	1:45:04	
2nd place, silver medalist(s)	55	Alex Yee	Great Britain	18:09	56:17	29:44	1:45:15	+ 0:11
3rd place, bronze medalist(s)	2	Hayden Wilde	New Zealand	18:17	56:07	29:52	1:45:24	+ 0:20
4	27	Marten van Riel	Belgium	17:45	56:37	30:21	1:45:52	+ 0:48
5	54	Jonathan Brownlee	Great Britain	17:49	56:38	30:22	1:45:53	+ 0:49
6	52	Kevin McDowell	United States	18:29	55:56	30:24	1:45:54	+ 0:50
7	18	Bence Bicsák	Hungary	17:55	56:26	30:24	1:45:56	+ 0:52
8	44	Gustav Iden	Norway	18:24	55:59	30:29	1:46:00	+ 0:56
9	47	Max Studer	Switzerland	18:25	55:59	30:35	1:46:06	+ 1:02
10	22	Mario Mola	Spain	18:21	56:06	30:38	1:46:13	+ 1:09
11	45	Casper Stornes	Norway	17:58	56:21	30:50	1:46:19	+ 1:15
12	20	Fernando Alarza	Spain	18:20	56:09	30:42	1:46:22	+ 1:18
13	7	Vincent Luis	France	17:39	56:45	30:51	1:46:24	+ 1:20
14	30	Kenji Nener	Japan	17:51	56:31	30:53	1:46:24	+ 1:20
15	15	Tyler Mislawchuk	Canada	17:50	56:35	30:55	1:46:28	+ 1:24
16	10	Jacob Birtwhistle	Australia	18:14	56:11	31:01	1:46:32	+ 1:28
17	6	Dorian Coninx	France	18:04	56:18	31:15	1:46:48	+ 1:44
18	1	Tayler Reid	New Zealand	17:45	56:40	31:25	1:46:54	+ 1:50
19	31	Makoto Odakura	Japan	18:21	56:05	31:26	1:47:03	+ 1:59
20	38	Shachar Sagiv	Israel	18:12	56:14	31:37	1:47:10	+ 2:06
21	5	Léo Bergère	France	18:00	56:22	31:47	1:47:20	+ 2:16
22	46	Andrea Salvisberg	Switzerland	18:02	56:03	32:10	1:47:25	+ 2:21
23	25	João Silva	Portugal	17:55	56:30	31:53	1:47:30	+ 2:26
24	11	Matthew Hauser	Australia	18:07	56:18	31:59	1:47:35	+ 2:31
25	21	Javier Gómez Noya	Spain	18:22	56:05	32:08	1:47:46	+ 2:42
26	12	Aaron Royle	Australia	18:09	56:14	32:21	1:47:57	+ 2:53
27	24	João Pereira	Portugal	17:56	56:31	32:27	1:48:03	+ 2:59
28	34	Manoel Messias	Brazil	18:37	57:40	30:43	1:48:11	+ 3:07
29	19	Tamás Tóth	Hungary	18:07	56:20	32:39	1:48:19	+ 3:15
30	39	Diego Moya	Chile	17:50	56:34	32:48	1:48:29	+ 3:25
31	40	Crisanto Grajales	Mexico	18:23	57:52	31:06	1:48:36	+ 3:32
32	8	Dmitry Polyanskiy	ROC	17:40	56:49	33:08	1:48:46	+ 3:42
33	56	Oscar Coggins	Hong Kong	17:54	56:29	33:23	1:48:55	+ 3:51
34	28	Lukas Hollaus	Austria	18:38	57:38	31:34	1:48:59	+ 3:55
35	37	Ran Sagiv	Israel	18:24	57:50	31:35	1:49:04	+ 4:00
36	23	Felix Duchampt	Romania	18:39	57:42	31:38	1:49:06	+ 4:02
37	35	Gianluca Pozzatti	Italy	18:00	56:24	33:31	1:49:14	+ 4:10
38	4	Jonas Schomburg	Germany	17:42	58:38	32:02	1:49:34	+ 4:30
39	36	Delian Stateff	Italy	17:54	56:31	34:24	1:50:00	+ 4:56
40	3	Justus Nieschlag	Germany	18:09	56:14	34:32	1:50:10	+ 5:06
41	33	Rostislav Pevtsov	Azerbaijan	18:27	57:50	33:17	1:50:46	+ 5:42
42	53	Morgan Pearson	United States	18:02	58:17	34:32	1:52:05 (Note: Pearson received a 15-second penalty for placing his equipment outside the box during the first transition. This penalty was served at the start of the running leg.)	+ 7:01
43	14	Stefan Zachaus	Luxembourg	17:56	56:29	36:45	1:52:21	+ 7:17
44	32	Mehdi Essadiq	Morocco	17:58	58:13	35:46	1:53:25	+ 8:21
45	41	Irving Pérez	Mexico	18:06	1:01:14	33:34	1:54:02	+ 8:58
46	42	Mohamad Maso	Syria	18:07	58:10	36:33	1:54:12	+ 9:08
47	17	Russell White	Ireland	18:35	57:40	37:05	1:54:40	+ 9:36
48	16	Matthew Sharpe	Canada	17:56	56:31	41:50	1:57:32	+ 12:28
	51	Henri Schoeman	South Africa	17:43	56:41	Did not finish (Note: Schoeman withdrew during the running leg due to an ankle injury.)		
	29	Alois Knabl	Austria	17:55	Did not finish (Note: Knabl had a mechanical problem during the cycling leg and was unable to continue.)			
DSQ	9	Igor Polyanskiy	ROC	~~17:47~~	~~58:30~~	~~34:34~~	~~1:52:07~~	~~+ 7:03~~
Source: Official results
