= Kristian Blummenfelt =

Norwegian triathlete (born 1994)

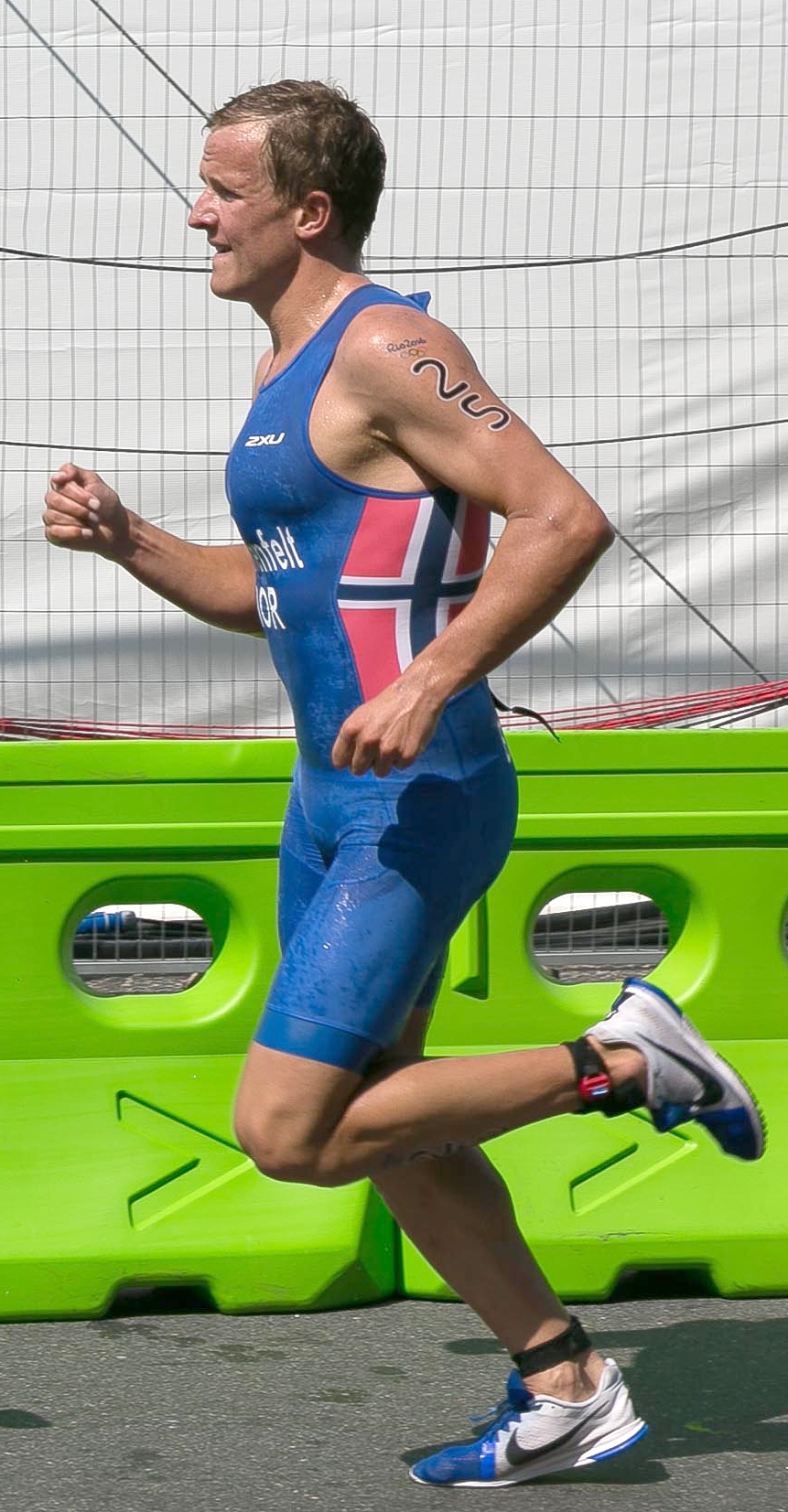
- Blummenfelt at the 2016 Summer Olympics

Personal information
- Nationality: Norwegian
- Born: 14 February 1994 (age 32) Bergen, Norway
- Height: 174 cm (5 ft 9 in)
- Weight: 74 kg (163 lb)

Sport
- Sport: Triathlon
- Club: Viking, NOR; Valence Triathlon, FRA
- Coached by: Olav Aleksander Bu
Medal record
Men's triathlon
Representing Norway
Olympic Games
Gold medal – first place	2020 Tokyo	Individual
World Triathlon Series
Gold medal – first place	2021 season	Men
Ironman World Championships
Gold medal – first place	2021 St. George	Elite
Bronze medal – third place	2022 Kona	Elite
Bronze medal – third place	2025 Nice	Elite
Ironman 70.3 World Championships
Gold medal – first place	2022 St. George	Elite
Silver medal – second place	2025 Marbella	Elite
Silver medal – second place	2026 Nice	Elite
European Triathlon Championships
Bronze medal – third place	2015 Geneva	Individual

Kristian Blummenfelt (born 14 February 1994) is a Norwegian triathlete, Olympic and world champion, competing at short course (sprint and standard distance), 70.3 (half-Ironman) and 140.6 (Ironman) distances. He won the gold medal in the men's triathlon at the 2020 Summer Olympics held in Tokyo, Japan. He is the 2021 Ironman World Champion at the first World Championship held at Saint George, Utah on May 7, 2022. On 5 June 2022, Blummenfelt became the first person to complete an Ironman-distance triathlon in under seven hours during the Sub7 Sub8 Project at the Lausitzring race track in Germany. Blummenfelt set a new unofficial world record for the Ironman-distance triathlon, in a time of 6:44:25. In late January 2026, he achieved the highest V̇O_{2} max ever tested with 101.1 mL/(kg·min).

== Career ==
Blummenfelt is the world record holder for the 70.3 distance, setting a time of 3:29:04 in 2018 and both repeating the feat and bettering his own mark in 2019 with a time of 3:25:21. This was the third victory for him in as many years at the Ironman 70.3 Middle East Championships held in Bahrain. Despite competing in the ITU World Triathlon Series for a number of years, his highest finish was second place until 31 August 2019 when he took the gold at the Grand Final in Lausanne. Blummenfelt was part of a 1-2-3 Norwegian finish at WTS Bermuda in 2018, finishing second to his compatriot Casper Stornes and ahead of their third teammate Gustav Iden. This was the first time this feat had been achieved in the ITU. A similar feat was achieved at the 70.3 Middle East Championships in Bahrain in 2018, with Blummenfelt finishing first ahead of Iden with Stornes in third place.

As a track runner, he represented the clubs Fana IL and TIF Viking and competed in the junior race at the 2011 European Cross Country Championships. In the triathlon he won a bronze medal at the 2015 European Championships and placed 13th at the 2016 Olympics.

In 2017, Blummenfelt achieved 3 silvers, a bronze and registered one DNF in the ITU WTS. Blummenfelt finished the 2017 season ranking 3rd overall in the WTS, a career-best placing in the competition to date. Blummenfelt raced the 70.3 Ironman Middle East Championships 2017 for the first time and finished in the top spot, registering a time of 3:40:24.

In 2018, in the WTS, Blummenfelt achieved 4 podium places with three silvers and a bronze, together with registering two DNFs at Yokohama and Abu Dhabi. Blummenfelt finished the 2018 season ranking 5th overall in the WTS. Blummenfelt raced the 70.3 Ironman Middle East Championships 2018 for the second year running, finished in the top spot and in doing so set a new world record for the distance of 3:29:04. This same year Blummenfelt has also began participating in Super League Triathlon (SLT) events. In 2021 he participated in SLT Malibu, as a wildcard for Team Rhinos. He finished the race 5th.

In 2019, Blummenfelt achieved his first career gold at ITU World Triathlon Series level at the Grand Final in Lausanne on 31 August. He finished the year with a World Triathlon Series (WTS) ranking of 10th overall, capping off a year where he failed to make the podium in any other ITU WTS races, and registered a DNF three times (Tokyo, Hamburg and Yokohama). Blummenfelt raced the 70.3 Ironman Middle East Championships 2019 for the third year running, beating his previous world record time to win and set a new mark of 3:25:21.

Due to the events of the COVID-19 outbreak the 2020 World Triathlon Series consisted of a single race.

During the 2020 Summer Olympics, Blummenfelt won the gold medal in Men's Triathlon.

The 2021 World Championship was held in St. George, Utah on 7 May 2022. The delay and change from the original Kona, Hawaii venue were due to the COVID-19 pandemic. On this date, the Ironman World Championship men's record was broken by Blummenfelt with a time of 7:49:16.

Blummenfelt trains up to eight hours a day: per week, he swims about 10 km; cycles about 300 km; runs about 100 km.

He placed twelfth in the men's triathlon at the 2024 Summer Olympics in Paris. Later that year, Blummenfelt competed in the Ironman World Championships. He placed thirty-fifth after projectile vomiting during the bike leg and completing the marathon run in 3:32.
