= Rostyslav Pevtsov =

Azerbaijani triathlete

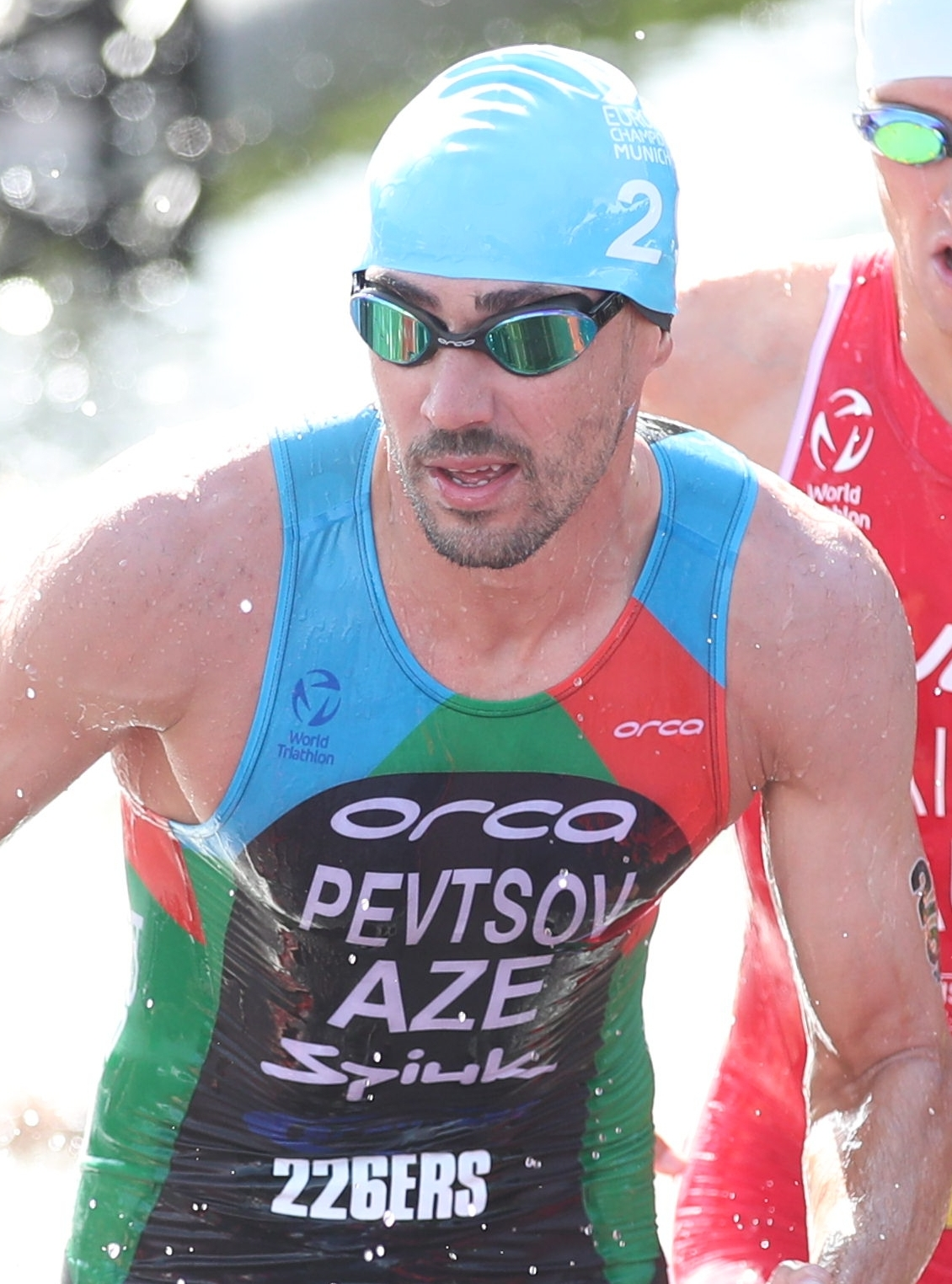

Personal information
- Nationality: Azerbaijani
- Born: 15 April 1987 (age 39) Kharkiv, Ukraine
- Height: 187 cm (6 ft 2 in)

Sport
- Sport: Triathlon
Medal record
Representing Azerbaijan
Men's triathlon
European Games
Bronze medal – third place	2015 Baku	Triathlon
Men's aquathlon
ITU Aquathlon World Championships
Gold medal – first place	2019 Pontevedra	Elite

Rostyslav Pevtsov (Azerbaijani: Rostislav Pevtsov; born 15 April 1987) is a Ukrainian & Azerbaijani triathlete. He competed in the men's event at the 2016 Summer Olympics held in Rio de Janeiro, Brazil. Pevtsov won the 2017 Hong Kong ASTC Sprint Triathlon Asian Cup. In 2021, he competed in the men's triathlon at the 2020 Summer Olympics held in Tokyo, Japan.
