= 2011 ITU Triathlon World Cup =

Series details
- Races: 9

Men's World Cup
- Most wins: 1: nine athletes

Women's World Cup
- Most wins: 1: nine athletes

World Triathlon Cup (formerly ITU Triathlon World Cup)
← 2010	2012 →

The 2011 ITU Triathlon World Cup was a series of triathlon races organised by the International Triathlon Union (ITU) for elite-level triathletes to be held during the 2011 season, effectively actin as the second tier of season-long draft legal triathlon racing behind the 2011 ITU Triathlon World Championships series. For 2011, nine races were announced as part of the World Cup series. The ninth and final race in Auckland, New Zealand, was added as a test race for the 2012 ITU World Triathlon Series Grand Final. Each race was held over a distance of 1500 m swim, 40 km cycle, 10 km run (an Olympic-distance triathlon). Alongside a prize purse, points were awarded at each race contributing towards the overall 2011 ITU Triathlon World Championships point totals.

== Venues, dates and prize purses ==
Date	City	County	Prize purse (US$)
Mar 27	Mooloolaba	Australia	50,000
Apr 27	Ishigaki	Japan	50,000
May 8	Monterrey	Mexico	50,000
Jul 10	Edmonton	Canada	50,000
Aug 14	Tiszaújváros	Hungary	50,000
Oct 9	Huatulco	Mexico	50,000
Oct 15	Tongyeong	South Korea	50,000
Nov 6	Guatapé	Colombia	50,000
Nov 20	Auckland	New Zealand	50,000

== Event results ==
=== Mooloolaba ===
Place	Men			Women		
Place	Name	Nation	Time	Name	Nation	Time
Gold medal	Brad Kahlefeldt	Australia	1:51:53	Nicky Samuels	New Zealand	2:03:13
Silver medal	Brendan Sexton	Australia	1:51:55	Emma Moffatt	Australia	2:03:33
Bronze medal	David Hauss	France	1:51:55	Bárbara Riveros Díaz	Chile	2:03:56

=== Ishigaki ===
Place	Men			Women		
Place	Name	Nation	Time	Name	Nation	Time
Gold medal	Hunter Kemper	United States	1:50:30	Bárbara Riveros Díaz	Chile	2:01:57
Silver medal	Artem Parienko	Russia	1:50:48	Aileen Morrison	Ireland	2:02:20
Bronze medal	Marek Jaskolka	Poland	1:50:50	Kiyomi Niwata	Japan	2:03:34

=== Monterrey ===
Place	Men			Women		
Place	Name	Nation	Time	Name	Nation	Time
Gold medal	Brendan Sexton	Australia	1:46:56	Sarah Haskins	United States	1:57:15
Silver medal	Frédéric Belaubre	France	1:47:06	Ai Ueda	Japan	1:57:21
Bronze medal	Hunter Kemper	United States	1:47:11	Anne Haug	Germany	1:57:27

=== Edmonton ===
Place	Men			Women		
Place	Name	Nation	Time	Name	Nation	Time
Gold medal	Bevan Docherty	New Zealand	1:46:47	Ashleigh Gentle	Australia	2:00:14
Silver medal	Aurélien Lescure	France	1:46:49	Mateja Simic	Slovenia	2:01:06
Bronze medal	Hunter Kemper	United States	1:46:54	Lisa Perterer	Austria	2:01:07

=== Tiszaújváros ===
Place	Men			Women		
Place	Name	Nation	Time	Name	Nation	Time
Gold medal	Brent McMahon	Canada	1:48:16	Gwen Jorgensen	United States	1:59:54
Silver medal	Aaron Harris	United Kingdom	1:48:22	Annamaria Mazzetti	Italy	2:00:02
Bronze medal	Akos Vanek	Hungary	1:48:43	Irina Abysova	Russia	2:00:18

=== Huatulco ===
Place	Men			Women		
Place	Name	Nation	Time	Name	Nation	Time
Gold medal	Matt Chrabot	United States	2:00:37	Juri Ide	Japan	2:12:52
Silver medal	Richard Murray	South Africa	2:00:50	Annamaria Mazzetti	Italy	2:13:39
Bronze medal	Bruno Pais	Portugal	2:01:05	Marina Damlaimcourt	Spain	2:13:52

=== Tongyeong ===
Place	Men			Women		
Place	Name	Nation	Time	Name	Nation	Time
Gold medal	Dmitry Polyanski	Russia	1:49:33	Jessica Harrison	France	2:00:41
Silver medal	José Miguel Pérez	Spain	1:49:49	Aileen Morrison	Ireland	2:01:09
Bronze medal	Simon De Cuyper	Belgium	1:49:52	Zuriñe Rodríguez	Spain	2:01:18

=== Guatapé ===
Place	Men			Women		
Place	Name	Nation	Time	Name	Nation	Time
Gold medal	Etienne Diemunsch	France	57:15	Carole Peon	France	1:04:11
Silver medal	Crisanto Grajales	Mexico	57:22	Tomoko Sakimoto	Japan	1:04:30
Bronze medal	Tony Moulai	France	57:26	Zuriñe Rodríguez	Spain	1:04:37

Overnight rains in the region forced organizers to shorten the course from an Olympic distance event to a sprint distance event.

=== Auckland ===
Place	Men			Women		
Place	Name	Nation	Time	Name	Nation	Time
Gold medal	Kris Gemmell	New Zealand	1:59:58	Andrea Hewitt	New Zealand	2:14:12
Silver medal	Bevan Docherty	New Zealand	2:01:05	Tomoko Sakimoto	Japan	2:15:09
Bronze medal	Ryan Fisher	New Zealand	2:01:18	Mariko Adachi	Japan	2:15:22

== Overall medal table ==
2011 ITU Triathlon World Cup medal table
Rank	Nation	Gold	Silver	Bronze	Total
1	New Zealand (NZL)	4	1	1	6
2	United States (USA)	4	0	2	6
3	France (FRA)	3	2	2	7
4	Australia (AUS)	3	2	0	5
5	Japan (JPN)	1	3	2	6
6	Russia (RUS)	1	1	1	3
7	Chile (CHI)	1	0	1	2
8	Canada (CAN)	1	0	0	1
9	Ireland (IRL)	0	2	0	2
9	Italy (ITA)	0	2	0	2
11	Spain (ESP)	0	1	3	4
12	Great Britain (GBR)	0	1	0	1
12	Mexico (MEX)	0	1	0	1
12	Slovenia (SLO)	0	1	0	1
12	South Africa (RSA)	0	1	0	1
16	Austria (AUT)	0	0	1	1
16	Belgium (BEL)	0	0	1	1
16	Germany (GER)	0	0	1	1
16	Hungary (HUN)	0	0	1	1
16	Poland (POL)	0	0	1	1
16	Portugal (POR)	0	0	1	1
Totals (21 entries)		18	18	18	54

== Multi-medalists for the season ==
The following athletes won two or medals in the World Cup season in 2011.

Multi-medalists at the 2011 ITU Triathlon World Cup
Rank	Athlete	Nation	Gold	Silver	Bronze	Total
1	Bevan Docherty	New Zealand (NZL)	1	1	0	2
1	Brendan Sexton	Australia (AUS)	1	1	0	2
3	Hunter Kemper	United States (USA)	1	0	2	3
4	Bárbara Riveros Díaz	Chile (CHI)	1	0	1	2
5	Aileen Morrison	Ireland (IRL)	0	2	0	2
5	Annamaria Mazzetti	Italy (ITA)	0	2	0	2
5	Tomoko Sakimoto	Japan (JPN)	0	2	0	2
8	Zuriñe Rodríguez	Spain (ESP)	0	0	2	2

== See also ==
- 2011 ITU Triathlon World Championships
