= 2012 ITU Triathlon World Cup =

World Triathlon Cup (formerly ITU Triathlon World Cup)
← 2011	2013 →

The 2012 ITU Triathlon World Cup was a series of triathlon races organised by the International Triathlon Union (ITU) for elite-level triathletes held during the 2012 season. For 2012, nine races were announced as part of the World Cup series. Each race was held over a distance of 1500 m swim, 40 km cycle, 10 km run (an Olympic-distance triathlon). Alongside a prize purse, points were awarded at each race contributing towards the overall 2012 ITU World Triathlon Series point totals. Eight of the nine stops in the world cup series are repeat destinations, with the stop in Banyoles, Spain being a new venue location for the cup.

== Triathlon World Cup schedule ==
Date	City	County
March 24–25	Mooloolaba	Australia
April 22	Ishigaki	Japan
May 6	Huatulco	Mexico
June 17	Banyoles	Spain
July 6-8	Edmonton	Canada
July 14-15	Tiszaújváros	Hungary
September 9	Guatapé	Colombia
September 22	Tongyeong	South Korea
October 7	Cancún	Mexico

== Event results ==
=== Mooloolaba ===
Place	Men			Women		
Place	Name	Nation	Time	Name	Nation	Time
Gold medal	Laurent Vidal	France	1:53:22	Erin Densham	Australia	2:03:22
Silver medal	Brad Kahlefeldt	Australia	1:53:22	Nicola Spirig	Switzerland	2:04:24
Bronze medal	David Hauss	France	1:53:22	Andrea Hewitt	Australia	2:04:31

=== Ishigaki ===
Place	Men			Women		
Place	Name	Nation	Time	Name	Nation	Time
Gold medal	David Hauss	France	1:50:06	Kathy Tremblay	Canada	2:05:38
Silver medal	Davide Uccellari	Italy	1:50:10	Aileen Morrison	Ireland	2:05:58
Bronze medal	Gonzalo Raul Tellechea	Argentina	1:50:19	Sarah-Anne Brault	Canada	2:06:03

=== Huatulco ===
Place	Men			Women		
Place	Name	Nation	Time	Name	Nation	Time
Gold medal	Simon De Cuyper	Belgium	2:02:34	Flora Duffy	Bermuda	2:13:17
Silver medal	Ryan Sissons	New Zealand	2:02:50	Pamela Oliveira	Brazil	2:13:47
Bronze medal	Danylo Sapunov	Ukraine	2:02:54	Claudia Rivas	Mexico	2:13:53

=== Banyoles ===
Place	Men			Women		
Place	Name	Nation	Time	Name	Nation	Time
Gold medal	Lukas Verzbicas	United States	1:47:28	Gwen Jorgensen	United States	1:59:39
Silver medal	Laurent Vidal	France	1:47:45	Erin Densham	Australia	1:59:55
Bronze medal	Dmitry Polyanskiy	Russia	1:48:04	Ashleigh Gentle	Australia	2:00:00

=== Edmonton ===
Place	Men			Women		
Place	Name	Nation	Time	Name	Nation	Time
Gold medal	Kyle Jones	Canada	57:33	Lauren Campbell	Canada	1:04:42
Silver medal	Alexander Hinton	Canada	57:36	Sarah-Anne Brault	Canada	1:04:52
Bronze medal	Jarrod Shoemaker	United States	57:41	Flora Duffy	Bermuda	1:04:56

=== Tiszaújváros ===
Place	Men			Women		
Place	Name	Nation	Time	Name	Nation	Time
Gold medal	Pierre Le Corre	France	51:54	Ashleigh Gentle	Australia	58:39
Silver medal	Aurélien Raphael	France	52:05	Maaike Caelers	Netherlands	58:43
Bronze medal	Anthony Pujades	France	52:10	Annamaria Mazzetti	Italy	59:19

=== Guatapé ===
Place	Men			Women		
Place	Name	Nation	Time	Name	Nation	Time
Gold medal	Crisanto Grajales	Mexico	2:02:14	Jodie Stimpson	United Kingdom	2:12:21
Silver medal	Sergio Sarmiento	Mexico	2:02:23	Maria Czesnik	Poland	2:17:15
Bronze medal	Manuel Huerta	United States	2:02:24	Paola Diaz	Mexico	2:20:42

=== Tongyeong ===
Place	Men			Women		
Place	Name	Nation	Time	Name	Nation	Time
Gold medal	Dmitry Polyanskiy	Russia	1:48:39	Nicky Samuels	New Zealand	2:01:51
Silver medal	Marek Jaskolka	Poland	1:49:06	Maria Czesnik	Poland	2:02:00
Bronze medal	Igor Polyanskiy	Russia	1:49:22	Yuka Sato	Japan	2:02:03

=== Cancún ===
Place	Men			Women		
Place	Name	Nation	Time	Name	Nation	Time
Gold medal	Sergio Sarmiento	Mexico	53:33	Katie Hewison	United Kingdom	1:00:19
Silver medal	Crisanto Grajales	Mexico	53:36	Kaitlin Shiver	United States	1:00:54
Bronze medal	Grégory Rouault	France	53:49	Lisa Perterer	Austria	1:00:56

== See also ==
- 2012 ITU World Triathlon Series
