= 2013 European Triathlon Championships =

2013 Europe Triathlon Championship
- Location: Israel, Eilat
- Date: 14-16 June 2013

The 2013 European Triathlon Championships was held in Alanya, Turkey from 14 June to 16 June 2013.

== Medallists ==
Event	Gold		Silver		Bronze	
Elite
Men	Ivan Vasiliev (RUS)	1:42:09	Alessandro Fabian (ITA)	1:42:16	Mario Mola (ESP)	1:42:22
Women	Rachel Klamer (NED)	1:55:43	Vicky Holland (GBR)	1:55:45	Vendula Frintová (CZE)	1:55:53
Mixed Relay	Germany	1:32:05	Russia	1:32:25	Italy	1:32:29
Junior
Men	Dorian Coninx (FRA)	0:52:40	Raphael Montoya (FRA)	0:52:59	Marc Austin (GBR)	0:53:05
Women	Georgia Taylor-Brown (GBR)	0:58:46	Laura Lindemann (GER)	0:59:03	Angelica Olmo (ITA)	0:59:11
Mixed Relay	United Kingdom	1:34:18	France	1:34:38	Germany	1:34:46

== Results ==
=== Men's ===
Key

- # denotes the athlete's bib number for the event
- Swimming denotes the time it took the athlete to complete the swimming leg
- Cycling denotes the time it took the athlete to complete the cycling leg
- Running denotes the time it took the athlete to complete the running leg
- Difference denotes the time difference between the athlete and the event winner
- Lapped denotes that the athlete was lapped and removed from the course

Rank	#	Triathlete	Swimming	Cycling	Running	Total time	Difference
1st place, gold medalist(s)	1	Ivan Vasiliev (RUS)	16:46	0:53:18	30:34	1:42:09	—
2nd place, silver medalist(s)	2	Alessandro Fabian (ITA)	16:42	0:53:23	30:43	1:42:16	+00:07
3rd place, bronze medalist(s)	3	Mario Mola (ESP)	17:04	0:54:46	29:05	1:42:22	+00:13
4	46	Maximilian Schwetz (GER)	16:39	0:53:23	31:07	1:42:42	+00:33
5	7	Vincent Luis (FRA)	16:37	0:54:46	31:16	1:42:48	+00:39
6	8	Pierre Le Corre (FRA)	16:41	0:53:28	31:26	1:42:57	+00:48
7	4	Dmitry Polyanskiy (RUS)	16:44	0:53:27	30:07	1:43:29	+01:20
8	9	Joao Pereira (POR)	16:51	0:53:22	30:14	1:43:31	+01:22
9	22	Danylo Sapunov (UKR)	16:46	0:55:11	32:05	1:43:43	+01:34
10	11	Davide Uccellari (ITA)	17:06	0:55:02	30:31	1:43:50	+01:41
11	5	Adam Bowden (GBR)	17:09	0:53:19	30:34	1:43:54	+01:45
12	55	Matthias Steinwandter (ITA)	17:08	0:54:44	30:34	1:44:01	+01:52
13	29	Miguel Arraiolos (POR)	17:14	0:54:40	30:50	1:44:16	+02:07
14	19	Uxio Abuin Ares (ESP)	17:06	0:54:49	31:08	1:44:25	+02:16
15	12	Jonathan Zipf (GER)	17:02	0:54:40	31:18	1:44:34	+02:25
16	10	Vladimir Turbayevskiy (RUS)	16:49	0:54:46	31:29	1:44:48	+02:39
17	23	Vicente Hernandez (ESP)	17:08	0:54:47	31:38	1:44:59	+02:50
18	21	Marco Van Der Stel (NED)	16:44	0:55:01	33:32	1:45:10	+03:01
19	31	Luca Facchinetti (ITA)	16:50	0:54:41	32:06	1:45:27	+03:18
20	24	Ricardo Hernandez Marrero (ESP)	17:10	0:53:20	32:36	1:45:53	+03:44
21	41	Anton Vitolin (UKR)	17:05	0:54:59	32:43	1:46:03	+03:54
22	33	Sebastian Rank (GER)	17:30	0:54:42	30:48	1:46:13	+04:04
23	14	Simon De Cuyper (BEL)	17:42	0:54:46	31:00	1:46:24	+04:15
24	42	Marten Van Riel (BEL)	17:07	0:56:31	33:29	1:46:54	+04:45
25	26	Stefan Zachäus (LUX)	16:44	0:56:19	35:44	1:47:17	+05:08
Source: Official results

=== Women's ===
Key

- # denotes the athlete's bib number for the event
- Swimming denotes the time it took the athlete to complete the swimming leg
- Cycling denotes the time it took the athlete to complete the cycling leg
- Running denotes the time it took the athlete to complete the running leg
- Difference denotes the time difference between the athlete and the event winner
- Lapped denotes that the athlete was lapped and removed from the course

Rank	#	Triathlete	Swimming	Cycling	Running	Total time	Difference
1st place, gold medalist(s)	9	Rachel Klamer (NED)	18:09	1:02:11	33:53	1:55:43	—
2nd place, silver medalist(s)	22	Vicky Holland (GBR)	18:17	1:02:07	33:55	1:55:45	+00:02
3rd place, bronze medalist(s)	4	Vendula Frintová (CZE)	18:21	1:02:03	34:06	1:55:53	+00:10
4	11	Annamaria Mazzetti (ITA)	18:27	1:02:07	34:17	1:56:03	+00:20
5	37	Oleksandra Kokhan (UKR)	18:25	1:02:03	34:24	1:56:15	+00:32
6	10	Anja Knapp (GER)	18:16	1:01:56	34:55	1:56:39	+00:56
7	23	Margit Vanek (HUN)	18:19	1:02:03	34:49	1:56:42	+00:59
8	20	Katrien Verstuyft (BEL)	18:22	1:02:03	35:05	1:56:55	+01:12
9	12	Alice Betto (ITA)	18:12	1:02:01	35:15	1:57:07	+01:24
10	14	Rebecca Robisch (GER)	19:03	1:02:03	33:56	1:57:09	+01:26
11	3	Jessica Harrison (FRA)	18:20	1:02:11	35:33	1:57:18	+01:35
12	6	Irina Abysova (RUS)	18:20	1:02:47	35:37	1:57:26	+01:43
13	28	Vanessa Raw (GBR)	18:22	1:02:02	35:49	1:57:40	+01:57
14	17	Melanie Hauss (SUI)	18:13	1:02:02	36:01	1:57:50	+02:07
15	5	Agnieszka Jerzyk (POL)	18:39	1:01:56	34:38	1:57:52	+02:09
16	21	Charlotte Bonin (ITA)	18:19	1:02:10	36:07	1:57:59	+02:16
17	26	Lois Rosindale (GBR)	19:03	1:03:11	34:50	1:58:08	+02:25
18	24	Carolina Routier (ESP)	18:07	1:02:04	36:28	1:58:19	+02:36
19	33	Elena Maria Petrini (ITA)	18:19	1:02:44	36:32	1:58:24	+02:41
20	1	Ainhoa Murua Zubizarreta (ESP)	19:07	1:02:14	35:24	1:58:40	+02:57
21	16	Anna Burova (RUS)	18:24	1:02:04	37:07	1:59:02	+03:19
22	15	Maria Czesnik (POL)	18:48	1:02:39	35:59	1:59:19	+03:36
23	18	Sara Vilic (AUT)	18:59	1:02:01	36:29	1:59:42	+03:59
24	19	Arina Shulgina (KAZ)	19:06	1:02:55	34:37	1:59:47	+04:04
25	2	Emmie Charayron (FRA)	19:00	1:02:47	36:43	1:59:57	+04:14
Source: Official results
