= 2013 ITU Triathlon World Cup =

World Triathlon Cup (formerly ITU Triathlon World Cup)
← 2012	2014 →

The 2013 ITU Triathlon World Cup was a series of triathlon races organised by the International Triathlon Union (ITU) for elite-level triathletes held during the 2013 season. For 2013, Ten races were announced as part of the World Cup series. Each race was held over a distance of 1500 m swim, 40 km cycle, 10 km run (an Olympic-distance triathlon). Alongside a prize purse, points were awarded at each race contributing towards the overall point totals.

== Triathlon World Cup schedule ==
Date	City	County
March 16–17	Mooloolaba	Australia
April 14	Ishigaki	Japan
May 19	Huatulco	Mexico
June 23	Edmonton	Canada
July 14	Palamos	Spain
August 10-11	Tiszaújváros	Hungary
September 29	Alicante	Spain
October 6	Cozumel	Mexico
October 12	Tongyeong	South Korea
October 27	Guatape	Colombia

== Event results ==
=== Mooloolaba ===
Place	Men			Women		
Place	Name	Nation	Time	Name	Nation	Time
Gold medal	Javier Gomez Noya	Spain	1:54:32	Anne Haug	Germany	2:04:31
Silver medal	Matt Chrabot	United States	1:54:53	Jodie Stimpson	United Kingdom	2:04:24
Bronze medal	Peter Kerr	Australia	1:54:55	Emma Moffatt	Australia	2:04:31

=== Ishigaki ===
Place	Men			Women		
Place	Name	Nation	Time	Name	Nation	Time
Gold medal	Ryan Fisher	Australia	1:52:46	Ai Ueda	Japan	2:05:47
Silver medal	Bryan Keane	Ireland	1:53:50	Yuka Sato	Japan	2:06:23
Bronze medal	Dan Wilson	Australia	1:54:02	Juri Ide	Japan	2:06:52

=== Huatulco ===
Place	Men			Women		
Place	Name	Nation	Time	Name	Nation	Time
Gold medal	Artem Parienko	Russia	2:03:12	Pamella Oliveira	Brazil	2:16:10
Silver medal	Luciano Taccone	Argentina	2:03:24	Lisa Perterer	Austria	2:16:48
Bronze medal	Irving Perez	Mexico	2:03:44	Yuliya Yelistratova	Ukraine	2:16:57

=== Edmonton ===
Place	Men			Women		
Place	Name	Nation	Time	Name	Nation	Time
Gold medal	Grégory Rouault	United States	00:57:39	Amelie Kretz	Canada	01:03:18
Silver medal	Kyle Jones	Canada	00:57:46	Ellen Pennock	Canada	01:03:29
Bronze medal	Ivan Ivanov	Ukraine	00:58:01	Kirsten Sweetland	Canada	01:03:35

=== Palamos ===
Place	Men			Women		
Place	Name	Nation	Time	Name	Nation	Time
Gold medal	Mark Buckingham	United Kingdom	57:33	Katie Zaferes	United States	1:04:42
Silver medal	Dmitry Polyanskiy	Russia	57:36	Annamaria Mazzetti	Italy	1:04:52
Bronze medal	Yegor Martynenko	Ukraine	57:41	Tamsyn Moana-Veale	Australia	1:04:56

=== Tiszaújváros ===
Place	Men			Women		
Place	Name	Nation	Time	Name	Nation	Time
Gold medal	Florin Salvisberg	Switzerland	00:53:46	Katie Zaferes	United States	01:00:25
Silver medal	Francesc Godoy Contreras	Spain	00:53:54	Aileen Reid	Ireland	01:00:52
Bronze medal	Frederic Belaubre	France	00:53:58	Sara Vilic	Austria	01:00:58

=== Alicante ===
Place	Men			Women		
Place	Name	Nation	Time	Name	Nation	Time
Gold medal	Sven Riederer	Switzerland	01:53:44	Jodie Stimpson	United Kingdom	02:02:39
Silver medal	Vicente Hernandez	Spain	01:53:46	Alice Betto	Italy	02:03:24
Bronze medal	Grant Sheldon	United Kingdom	01:53:48	Rachel Klamer	Netherlands	02:04:15

=== Cozumel ===
Place	Men			Women		
Place	Name	Nation	Time	Name	Nation	Time
Gold medal	Javier Gomez Noya	Spain	00:53:26	Nicola Spirig	Switzerland	00:57:53
Silver medal	Aurélien Lescure	Turkey	00:53:28	Sarah True	United States	00:57:58
Bronze medal	Dmitry Polyanskiy	Russia	00:53:31	Lisa Perterer	Austria	00:58:11

=== Tongyeong ===
Place	Men			Women		
Place	Name	Nation	Time	Name	Nation	Time
Gold medal	Tony Moulai	France	01:51:23	Emma Jackson	Australia	02:02:49
Silver medal	Igor Polyanskiy	Russia	01:51:31	Vendula Frintova	Czech Republic	02:04:17
Bronze medal	Daniel Hofer	Italy	01:51:31	Natalie Van Coevorden	Australia	02:04:59

=== Guatapé ===
Place	Men			Women		
Place	Name	Nation	Time	Name	Nation	Time
Gold medal	Reinaldo Colucci	Brazil	01:58:48	Ainhoa Murua Zubizarreta	Spain	02:14:48
Silver medal	Carlos Quinchara	Colombia	01:58:58	Mateja Šimic	Slovenia	02:15:13
Bronze medal	Etienne Diemunsch	France	01:59:13	Charlotte Morel	France	02:15:32

== See also ==
- 2013 ITU World Triathlon Series
