= 2010 ITU Triathlon World Cup =

Series details
- Races: 8

Men's World Cup
- Most wins: 1 : eight athletes

Women's World Cup
- Most wins: 1 : eight athletes

World Triathlon Cup (formerly ITU Triathlon World Cup)
← 2009	2011 →

The 2010 ITU Triathlon World Cup was a series of triathlon races organised by the International Triathlon Union (ITU) for elite-level triathletes held during the 2010 season. Eight races were announced as part of the 2010 World Cup series. Each race was held over a distance of 1500 m swim, 40 km cycle, 10 km run (an Olympic-distance triathlon). Alongside a prize purse, points were awarded at each race contributing towards the overall 2010 ITU Triathlon World Championships point totals.

Unusually, the sixteen different races, eight for each sex, provided sixteen different winners. The eight men's races produced twenty-four different medalists, with no man winning more than a single World Cup medal in the entire campaign, while on the women's side a medal of each colour made Japan's Ai Ueda the season's most successful participant.

== Venues, dates and prize purses ==
Date	City	County	Prize purse (US$)
Mar 27–28	Mooloolaba	Australia	50,000
Apr 18	Monterrey	Mexico	50,000
Apr 25	Ishigaki	Japan	
Jun 13	Des Moines	United States	1,000,000
Jul 10	Holten	Netherlands	50,000
Aug 8	Tiszaújváros	Hungary	50,000
Oct 10	Huatulco	Mexico	50,000
Oct 16	Tongyeong	South Korea	50,000

== Event results ==
=== Mooloolaba ===
Place	Men			Women		
Place	Name	Nation	Time	Name	Nation	Time
Gold medal	Brad Kahlefeldt	Australia	1:51:31	Vendula Frintová	Czech Republic	2:03:15
Silver medal	Stuart Hayes	Great Britain	1:51:41	Tomoko Sakimoto	Japan	2:03:27
Bronze medal	James Seear	Australia	1:51:58	Liz Blatchford	Great Britain	2:03:43

=== Monterrey ===
Place	Men			Women		
Place	Name	Nation	Time	Name	Nation	Time
Gold medal	Joao Silva	Portugal	1:44:40	Paula Findlay	Canada	1:56:40
Silver medal	Matt Charbot	United States	1:45:05	Ai Ueda	Japan	1:57:13
Bronze medal	Gregor Buchholz	Germany	1:45:08	Line Jensen	Denmark	1:58:25

=== Ishigaki ===
Place	Men			Women		
Place	Name	Nation	Time	Name	Nation	Time
Gold medal	Valentin Meshcheryakov	Russia	1:54:02	Kiyomi Niwata	Japan	2:07:21
Silver medal	Yuichi Hosoda	Japan	1:54:07	Liz Blatchford	Great Britain	2:07:32
Bronze medal	Ryosuke Yamamoto	Japan	1:54:19	Ai Ueda	Japan	2:08:11

=== Des Moines ===
Place	Men			Women		
Place	Name	Nation	Time	Name	Nation	Time
Gold medal	Tim Don	Great Britain	1:50:20	Emma Snowsill	Australia	1:59:35
Silver medal	Kris Gemmell	New Zealand	1:50:23	Emma Moffatt	Australia	1:59:51
Bronze medal	Courtney Atkinson	Australia	1:50:28	Helen Jenkins	Great Britain	1:59:51

=== Holten ===
Place	Men			Women		
Place	Name	Nation	Time	Name	Nation	Time
Gold medal	Ivan Tutukin	Russia	1:54:21	Erin Densham	Australia	2:01:27
Silver medal	Yulian Malyshev	Russia	1:54:23	Annamaria Mazzetti	Italy	2:02:04
Bronze medal	João José Pereira	Portugal	1:54:24	Radka Vodičková	Czech Republic	2:03:03

=== Tiszaújváros ===
Place	Men			Women		
Place	Name	Nation	Time	Name	Nation	Time
Gold medal	Reinaldo Colucci	Brazil	1:49:07	Yuliya Sapunova	Ukraine	2:01:01
Silver medal	Crisanto Grajales	Mexico	1:49:09	Jodie Swallow	Great Britain	2:01:02
Bronze medal	Martin Krňávek	Czech Republic	1:49:13	Carla Moreno	Brazil	2:01:10

=== Huatulco ===
Place	Men			Women		
Place	Name	Nation	Time	Name	Nation	Time
Gold medal	Javier Gomez	Spain	1:49:08	Ai Ueda	Japan	1:59:51
Silver medal	Ruedi Wild	Switzerland	1:49:38	Nicola Spirig	Switzerland	2:00:24
Bronze medal	Matt Chrabot	United States	1:49:54	Rachel Klamer	Netherlands	2:00:40

=== Tongyeong ===
Place	Men			Women		
Place	Name	Nation	Time	Name	Nation	Time
Gold medal	Dan Wilson	Australia	1:49:36	Jodie Swallow	Great Britain	2:01:38
Silver medal	Aurélien Raphael	France	1:49:52	Anja Dittmer	Germany	2:03:15
Bronze medal	Vincent Luis	France	1:49:57	Ainhoa Murua	Spain	2:03:19

== See also ==
- ITU Triathlon World Championships
