= Triathlon at the 2012 Summer Olympics – Men's =

Men's triathlon at the Games of the XXX Olympiad
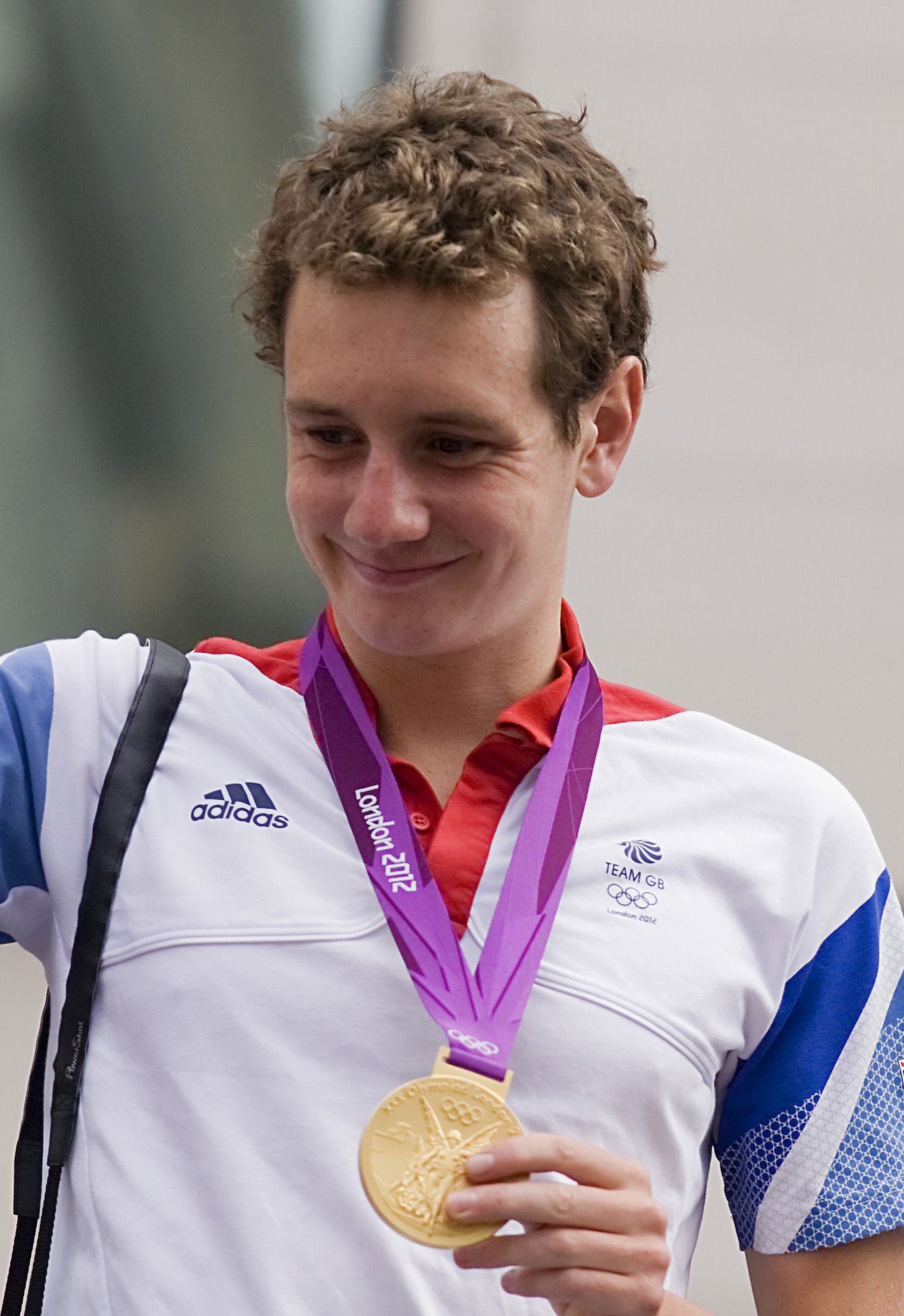
- Alistair Brownlee, gold medallist at the Our Greatest Team Parade on 10 September 2012
- Venue: Hyde Park; 54.8 km (34.1 mi)
- Date: 7 August 2012
- Competitors: 55 from 32 nations
- Winning time: 1:46:25

Medalists
1st place, gold medalist(s)		Alistair Brownlee	Great Britain
2nd place, silver medalist(s)		Javier Gómez	Spain
3rd place, bronze medalist(s)		Jonny Brownlee	Great Britain

The men's triathlon was one of the triathlon events at the 2012 Summer Olympics in London, United Kingdom. It took place on 7 August 2012, featuring 55 men from 32 countries. It was the fourth appearance of an Olympic men's triathlon event since the first at the 2000 Olympics in Sydney. The race was around Hyde Park, a 1.42 km^{2} park in central London. The race was held over the "international distance" (also called "Olympic distance") and consisted of 1.5 kilometres (0.93 mi) swimming, 42.959 kilometres (26.693 mi) road cycling, and 10 kilometres (6.2 mi) road running.

A group of six finished the 1,500 metres (1,600 yd) swim leg in a lead group. Great Britain's Jonny Brownlee was given a 15-second penalty for an illegal transition between the swimming and cycling disciplines. A large lead group was together at the end of the cycling leg but Jonny Brownlee's brother Alistair Brownlee (Great Britain) broke away on the run to win the gold medal with Spain's Javier Gómez in second and Jonny Brownlee in third. Alistair Brownlee earned Great Britain's nineteenth gold medal at the 2012 Games.

Almost immediately after the race, bronze-medallist Jonny Brownlee collapsed due to heat stroke; it was confirmed he would suffer no permanent damage.

== Qualification ==
Qualification for the race was restricted to three athletes per National Olympic Committee (NOC), an organisation representing a country at the Olympics, until eight NOCs had three qualified athletes. Once eight NOCs had qualified three athletes; a NOC was limited to two entries. A NOC with an athlete who won one of the five continental championships (Africa, Asia, Pan America, Europe and Oceania) were given one place in the event. Additionally, three places were available for the NOC of the medallists at the International Triathlon Union (ITU) World Qualification Event. Another 38 places were available to the NOCs with the highest ranked athletes on the ITU Olympic Qualification List on 31 May 2012. If an athlete had already qualified through another method the NOC did not receive another quota with it instead going to the next NOC on the ITU Olympic Qualification List. Five more entries into the event were given to one NOC per continental region. This was based on the ITU Olympic Qualification List with the highest ranked athlete from a non-qualified NOC in their continental region qualifying a place for their NOC in the event. One was given to the Great Britain NOC as the hosts but as they had already gained a place, the host place was given to the highest eligible athlete on the ITU Olympic Qualification List's NOC. The final two places for the event was given to two NOCs chosen by the Tripartite Commission.

For all qualification places the qualified NOC had the right to select any athlete who, by 31 May 2012, were in the top 140 of the ITU Olympic Qualification List, in the top 140 of the 2012 ITU World Triathlon Series or in the top 140 of the ITU Points List.

== Preview ==
Alistair and Jonny Brownlee were considered strong favourites before the race. The 2000 men's Olympic triathlon champion, Canadian Simon Whitfield, said that, "If you run this Olympic race ten times, one of the Brownlee brothers will win nine out of ten times. But they won’t win it that 10th time, and you try to be that person to be there to capitalise on it that 10th time.” Among other contenders were Javier Gómez of Spain, who was the ITU Triathlon World Champion in both the 2008 World Championships and the 2010 World Championships; New Zealander Bevan Docherty; Whitfield of Canada and the 2008 Olympic champion Jan Frodeno from Germany.

== Course ==
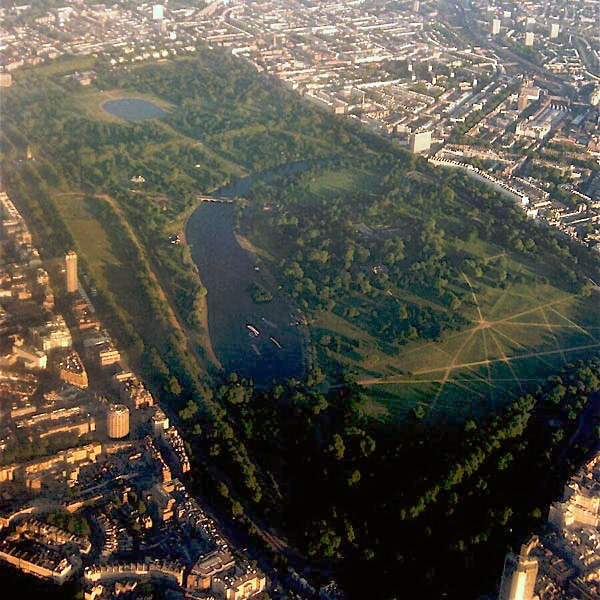
Hyde Park

The event was contested in Hyde Park in Central London, a park opened in 1637. The 1.5-kilometre (0.93 mi) swim started on the north side of The Serpentine and the course was one lap. One of the female competitors, Laura Bennett, said that the swim was the hardest part of the course after competing in the London leg of the 2011 ITU World Championship Series on the Olympic course: “The swim was the most difficult, it was hard to get away from everyone.” After the swim there was then a 200 metres (220 yd) transition zone in front of the main grandstand. The competitors then started a 43-kilometre (27 mi) bike leg consisting of seven 6.137-kilometre (3.813 mi) laps. The cyclists first rode down Serpentine Road towards West Carriage Drive before changing direction and cycling to Hyde Park Corner. The course then quickly turned left towards Hyde Park to go past Buckingham Palace on Constitution Hill. Once passing Buckingham Palace, the cyclist turned and went back towards Hyde Park and eventually crossing through the transition area before starting the next lap. The final discipline was the run. It was four-laps of a 2.5-kilometre (1.6 mi) loop around The Serpentine on flat ground.

The course was designed to be as spectator-friendly as possible. The athletes passed through the main grandstand area 12 times. The men's triathlon was one of the few events with free viewing points.

== Race ==
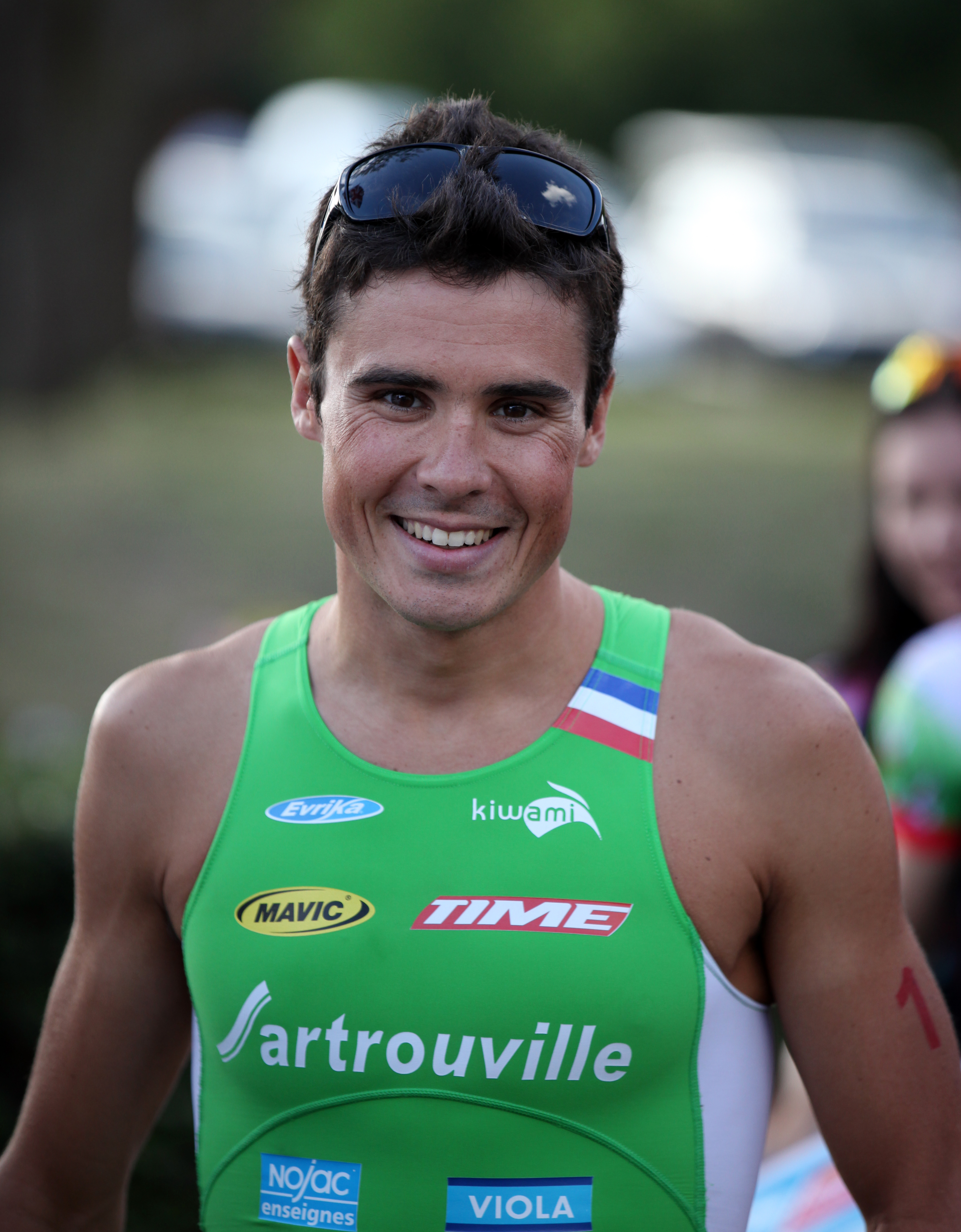
Javier Gómez, one of the pre-race favourites and eventual silver-medallist

The race started at 11:30 a.m. on 7 August 2012. Richard Varga led early in the swim and held the lead to come out of the water first. His swim leg split time was 16 minutes and 56 seconds, four seconds faster than Javier Gómez and those two; along with both of the Brownlees, Ivan Vasiliev and Alessandro Fabian; formed a lead group of six that had an 11 second gap over the rest of the field. At the transition between the running and cycling legs, Jonny Brownlee was given a 15 second penalty for riding his bike before the transition zone. On the ride the race reformed with a 22-man strong group together for the majority of the discipline. Alistair Brownlee, aware of both his superiority in the run leg and the penalty facing his brother, put the hammer down from the very beginning of the run, aiming to crack the rest of the field and create a gap for himself and his brother. The senior Brownlee soon started to run away from the rest of the field with only his brother and Gómez attempting to follow him. Jonny Brownlee was dropped from the group at approximately halfway through the run and then Alistair Brownlee dropped Gómez with 3 kilometres (1.9 mi) to go. Alistair Brownlee would go on to win the race in a time of one hour, 46 minutes and 25 seconds, beating Gómez by 11 seconds. Despite having to serve his time penalty at the end of the second-last running lap, the brutal speed of the group of three worked as Jonny Brownlee held on to the bronze medal position, 20 seconds behind Gómez but 18 seconds in front of fourth-placed David Hauss of France.

Bronze-medallist Jonny Brownlee collapsed almost immediately after crossing the finish line. Paramedics gave him treatment and diagnosed heat stroke. He was taken to the medical tent where it was determined he would suffer no long-lasting effects.

Alistair Brownlee criticised the penalty that he thought cost his brother the silver medal: "I've never been a fan of these penalties, I think they're ruining the sport." Alistair also called the rules "disgusting" and accused triathlon organisers of "ruining" the sport.

== Results ==
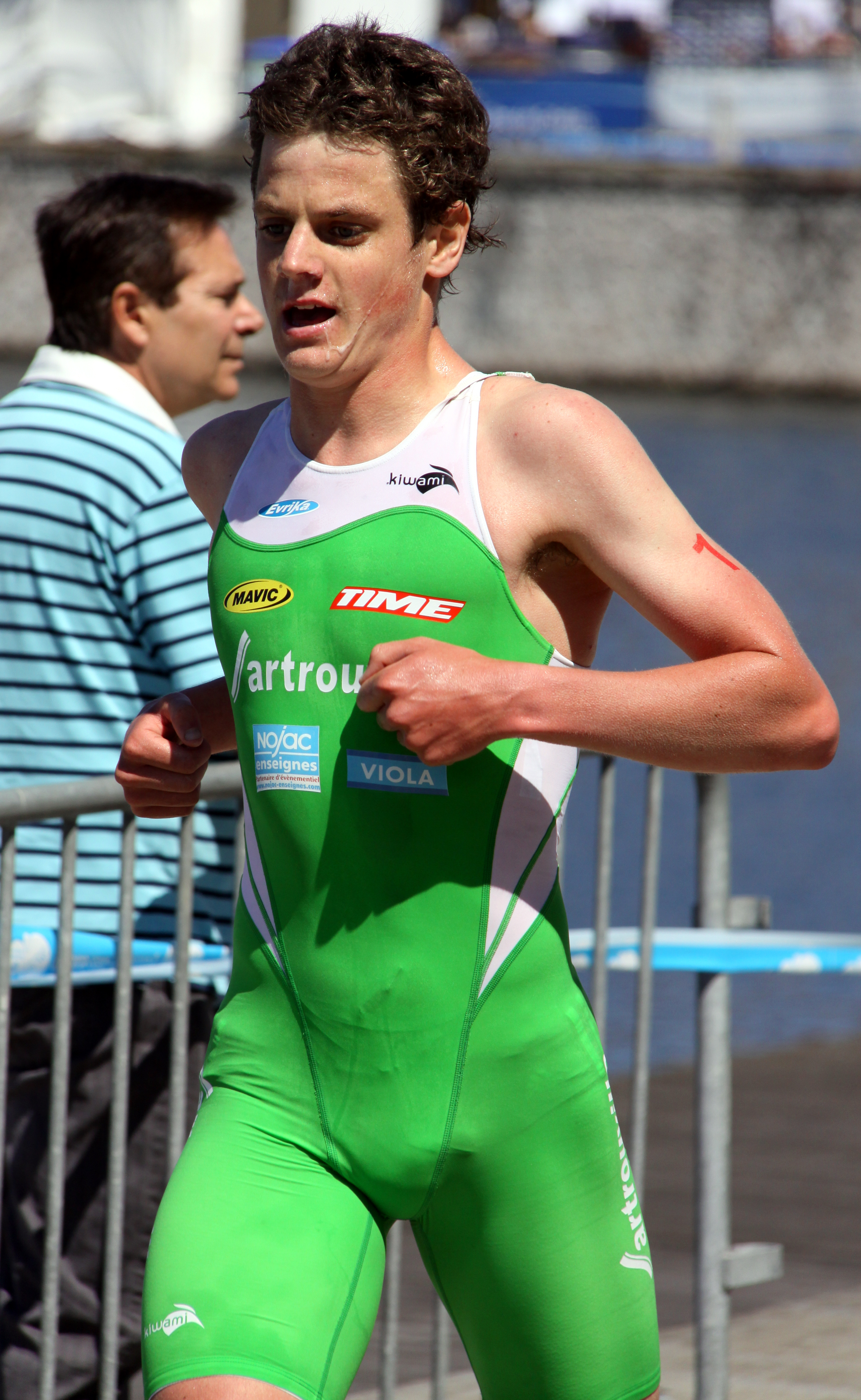
Jonny Brownlee finished in the bronze-medal position

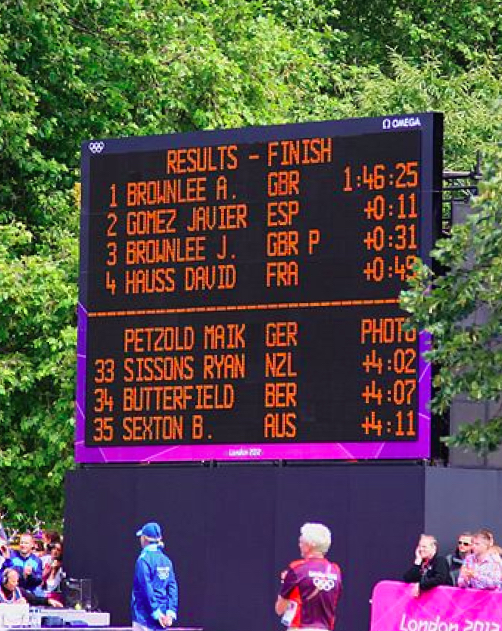
The results board at the finish line

Key

- # denotes the athlete's bib number for the event
- Swimming denotes the time it took the athlete to complete the swimming leg
- Cycling denotes the time it took the athlete to complete the cycling leg
- Running denotes the time it took the athlete to complete the running leg
- Difference denotes the time difference between the athlete and the event winner
- * The total time includes both transitions

Rank	#	Triathlete	Country	Swimming	Cycling	Running	Total time*	Difference
1st place, gold medalist(s)	30	Alistair Brownlee	Great Britain	17:04	59:08	29:07	1:46:25	
2nd place, silver medalist(s)	51	Javier Gómez	Spain	17:00	59:16	29:16	1:46:36	+0:11
3rd place, bronze medalist(s)	31	Jonny Brownlee	Great Britain	17:02	59:11	29:37	1:46:56	+0:31
4	11	David Hauss	France	17:24	58:50	29:53	1:47:14	+0:49
5	14	Laurent Vidal	France	17:27	58:42	30:01	1:47:21	+0:56
6	46	Jan Frodeno	Germany	17:20	58:46	30:06	1:47:26	+1:01
7	25	Alexander Bryukhankov	Russia	17:22	58:51	30:10	1:47:35	+1:10
8	21	Sven Riederer	Switzerland	17:22	58:52	30:23	1:47:46	+1:21
9	17	João Silva	Portugal	17:22	58:54	30:33	1:47:51	+1:26
10	35	Alessandro Fabian	Italy	17:01	59:10	30:43	1:48:03	+1:38
11	12	Vincent Luis	France	17:20	58:53	31:00	1:48:18	+1:53
12	54	Bevan Docherty	New Zealand	17:26	58:51	31:12	1:48:35	+2:10
13	27	Ivan Vasiliev	Russia	17:03	59:04	31:22	1:48:43	+2:18
14	43	Hunter Kemper	United States	17:25	58:44	31:20	1:48:46	+2:21
15	55	Kris Gemmell	New Zealand	17:26	58:48	31:31	1:48:52	+2:27
16	47	Steffen Justus	Germany	18:07	59:36	30:16	1:49:12	+2:47
17	19	Richard Murray	South Africa	18:11	59:38	30:25	1:49:15	+2:50
18	39	Courtney Atkinson	Australia	17:26	58:48	31:58	1:49:19	+2:54
19	52	Mario Mola	Spain	18:09	59:40	30:27	1:49:23	+2:58
20	38	Hirokatsu Tayama	Japan	17:24	58:45	31:57	1:49:24	+2:59
21	26	Dmitry Polyanski	Russia	17:14	1:00:35	30:28	1:49:24	+2:59
22	18	Richard Varga	Slovakia	16:56	59:15	32:03	1:49:25	+3:00
23	7	Gavin Noble	Ireland	17:24	58:50	32:26	1:49:47	+3:22
24	53	José Miguel Pérez	Spain	18:07	59:40	30:57	1:49:53	+3:28
25	3	Kyle Jones	Canada	18:31	59:17	31:03	1:49:58	+3:33
26	28	Simon De Cuyper	Belgium	17:58	59:45	31:10	1:50:00	+3:35
27	4	Brent McMahon	Canada	18:04	59:40	31:09	1:50:03	+3:38
28	50	Crisanto Grajales	Mexico	18:10	59:36	31:11	1:50:08	+3:43
29	36	Davide Uccellari	Italy	18:26	59:16	31:13	1:50:09	+3:44
30	44	Jan Čelůstka	Czech Republic	17:25	58:49	32:54	1:50:17	+3:52
31	48	Maik Petzold	Germany	17:23	58:47	33:00	1:50:23	+3:58
32	40	Brad Kahlefeldt	Australia	18:06	59:40	31:29	1:50:23	+3:58
33	56	Ryan Sissons	New Zealand	18:05	59:45	31:31	1:50:27	+4:02
34	6	Tyler Butterfield	Bermuda	18:58	58:32	31:52	1:50:32	+4:07
35	41	Brendan Sexton	Australia	18:53	58:51	31:41	1:50:36	+4:11
36	33	Reinaldo Colucci	Brazil	18:56	58:47	32:07	1:50:59	+4:34
37	32	Stuart Hayes	Great Britain	17:17	59:04	33:29	1:51:04	+4:39
38	49	Gonzalo Tellechea	Argentina	18:59	58:48	32:11	1:51:07	+4:42
39	22	Ruedi Wild	Switzerland	18:28	59:17	32:15	1:51:10	+4:45
40	20	Andreas Giglmayr	Austria	18:57	58:45	32:21	1:51:14	+4:49
41	16	Bruno Pais	Portugal	18:57	58:44	32:30	1:51:22	+4:57
42	23	Danylo Sapunov	Ukraine	18:08	59:35	32:38	1:51:32	+5:07
43	37	Yuichi Hosoda	Japan	18:06	59:37	32:43	1:51:40	+5:15
44	34	Diogo Sclebin	Brazil	18:10	59:36	32:53	1:51:51	+5:26
45	45	Přemysl Švarc	Czech Republic	18:08	59:37	33:13	1:52:08	+5:43
46	2	Bai Faquan	China	17:55	59:46	33:26	1:52:26	+6:01
47	8	Marek Jaskółka	Poland	17:58	59:45	33:45	1:52:38	+6:13
48	1	Leonardo Chacón	Costa Rica	17:24	1:00:19	33:42	1:52:39	+6:14
49	9	Hervé Banti	Monaco	18:55	58:51	33:44	1:52:42	+6:17
50	24	Felipe Van de Wyngard	Chile	18:53	58:52	34:03	1:53:02	+6:37
51	42	Manuel Huerta	United States	18:57	58:51	34:39	1:53:39	+7:14
52	10	Christopher Felgate	Zimbabwe	18:09	59:36	34:51	1:53:53	+7:28
53	29	Carlos Quinchara	Colombia	18:02	59:37	35:13	1:54:10	+7:45
54	15	Heo Min-Ho	South Korea	18:02	59:46	35:36	1:54:30	+8:05
—	5	Simon Whitfield	Canada (Note: Whitfield crashed on the bike leg.)	17:23	Did not finish			
Source: Official results
