= 2014 ITU Triathlon World Cup =

World Triathlon Cup (formerly ITU Triathlon World Cup)
← 2013	2015 →

The 2014 ITU Triathlon World Cup is a series of triathlon races organised by the International Triathlon Union (ITU) for elite-level triathletes held during the 2014 season. For 2014, ten races were announced as part of the World Cup series. Each race is held over a distance of 1500 m swim, 40 km cycle, 10 km run (an Olympic-distance triathlon).

== Triathlon World Cup schedule ==
Date	City	County
March 15	Mooloolaba	Australia
March 23	New Plymouth	New Zealand
May 10–11	Chengdu	China
June 15	Huatulco	Mexico
July 26–27	Jiayuguan	China
August 9–10	Tiszaújváros	Hungary
September 27–28	Alanya	Turkey
October 5	Cozumel	Mexico
October 12	Cartagena	Colombia
October 18	Tongyeong	South Korea

== Event results ==
=== Mooloolaba ===
Place	Men			Women		
Place	Name	Nation	Time	Name	Nation	Time
Gold medal	Mario Mola	Spain	00:54:18	Gwen Jorgensen	United States	00:59:55
Silver medal	Richard Murray	South Africa	00:54:37	Katie Hursey	United States	01:00:10
Bronze medal	Sven Riederer	Switzerland	00:55:04	Ai Ueda	Japan	01:00:14

=== New Plymouth ===
Place	Men			Women		
Place	Name	Nation	Time	Name	Nation	Time
Gold medal	Mario Mola	Spain	00:52:30	Katie Hursey	United States	00:57:27
Silver medal	Javier Gómez Noya	Spain	00:52:33	Andrea Hewitt	New Zealand	00:57:38
Bronze medal	João Silva	Portugal	00:52:56	Jodie Stimpson	United Kingdom	00:57:39

=== Chengdu ===
Place	Men			Women		
Place	Name	Nation	Time	Name	Nation	Time
Gold medal	Wian Sullwald	South Africa	01:48:47	Gillian Backhouse	Australia	02:01:04
Silver medal	Kevin Mcdowell	United States	01:48:48	Jessica Broderick	United States	02:01:33
Bronze medal	Aurélien Lebrun	France	01:48:59	Claire Michel	Belgium	02:01:46

=== Huatulco ===
Place	Men			Women		
Place	Name	Nation	Time	Name	Nation	Time
Gold medal	Luciano Taccone	Argentina	02:01:58	Ai Ueda	Japan	02:14:52
Silver medal	Davide Uccellari	Italy	02:02:08	Claudia Rivas	Mexico	02:15:19
Bronze medal	Aurélien Lescure	France	02:02:09	Mateja Šimic	Slovenia	02:16:48

=== Jiayuguan ===
Place	Men			Women		
Place	Name	Nation	Time	Name	Nation	Time
Gold medal	Vladimir Turbayevskiy	Russia	01:49:54	Maria Cześnik	Poland	02:00:10
Silver medal	Jarrod Shoemaker	United States	01:49:57	Yurie Kato	Japan	02:00:33
Bronze medal	Igor Polyanski	Russia	01:50:00	Ditte Kristensen	Denmark	02:00:47

== See also ==
- 2014 ITU World Triathlon Series
- 2015 ITU Triathlon World Cup
