= Brendan Sexton =

Brendan Sexton may refer to:

- Brendan Sexton III (born 1980), American actor
- Brendan Sexton (triathlete) (born 1985), Australian triathlete
