= Tiszaújvárosi Sportpark =

Sports venue in Tiszaújváros, Hungary

- Olefin Sporttelep
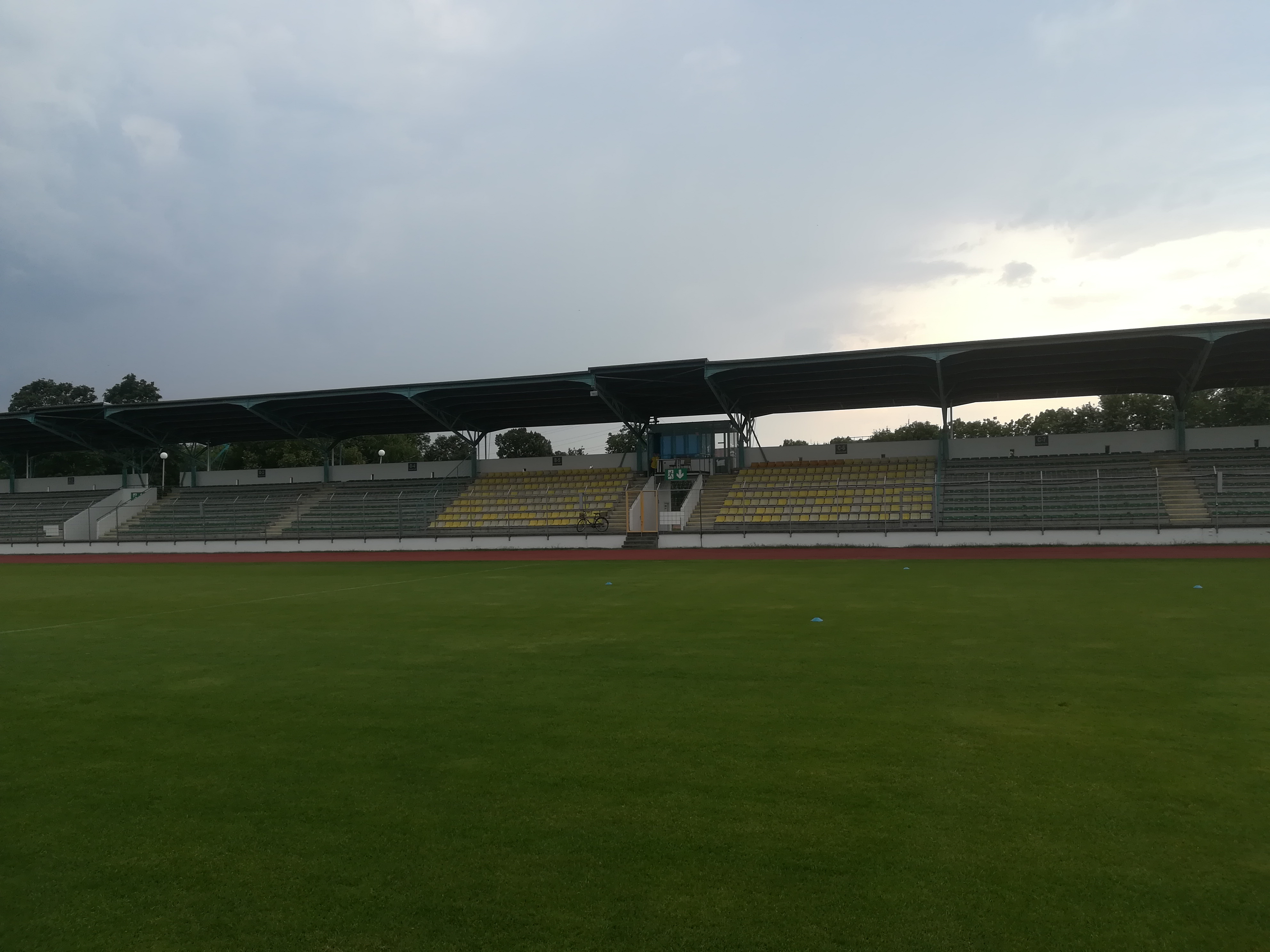
- Tiszaújvárosi Sportpark in 2019.
- Interactive map of Tiszaújvárosi Sportpark
- Address: Teleki Blanka út 6
- Location: Tiszaújváros, Hungary
- Coordinates: 47°55′48.8″N 21°03′04.4″E
- Operator: Tiszaújváros
- Capacity: 4,000 on seats
- Surface: grass
- Field size: 104m x 68m

Construction
- Opened: 1968

Tenant
- Tiszaújváros (1968–present)

Tiszaújvárosi Sportpark is a multi-use stadium in Tiszaújváros, Hungary. It is used mostly for football matches and is the home ground of FC Tiszaújváros. The stadium was opened in 1968 under the name of Olefin Sporttelep and currently holds 4,000 seats.
