= Čelůstka =

Čelůstka (feminine: Čelůstková) is a Czech surname. Notable people with the surname include:

- Jan Čelůstka (born 1982), Czech triathlete
- Ondřej Čelůstka (born 1989), Czech footballer
