= Liam Ball =

Irish swimmer

Personal information
- Nationality: Irish (Northern Irish)
- Born: May 17, 1951 Derry, Northern Ireland
- Died: June 16, 1984 (aged 33) Castlebar, Northern Ireland
- Height: 184 cm (6 ft 0 in)
- Weight: 73 kg (161 lb)

Sport
- Sport: Swimming
- Strokes: Breaststroke
- Club: City of Derry SC

Patrick Liam Ball (17 May 1951 – 16 June 1984) was a swimmer from Northern Ireland that competed at two Olympic Games.

== Biography ==
Ball was born in Derry, Northern Ireland and was a past pupil of St. Columb's College in the city.

He competed for Ireland at both the 1968 Mexico City Summer Games and the 1972 Munich Olympic Summer Games, in the Men's 100 metres breaststroke and Men's 200 metres breaststroke at each.

Ball represented the 1966 Northern Irish Team at the 1966 British Empire and Commonwealth Games in Kingston, Jamaica, participating in the 110 yards and 220 yards breaststroke events.

A local hero, Ball appears in a mural on Creggan's Central Drive. The annual Liam Ball International Triathlon, hosted by the North West Triathlon Club at Templemore Sports Complex in Derry, is also named after Ball.

He died aged 33 at his home in Castlebar after a long illness on 16 June 1984. He had been manager of the local swimming pool.
