= Tiszaszederkény =

Coordinates: 47°56′N 21°05′E

Tiszaszederkény is a former village, part of the town Tiszaújváros in Borsod-Abaúj-Zemplén County of Hungary. The town was built up in the outskirts of the village from the 1950s. Although the territory was first settled more than 6,000 years ago, the village was first mentioned in an official charter in the 13th century. During the Ottoman invasion, many people escaped from the village and it became depopulated. Through the centuries, the place became well-known and more and more people arrived. The place was affected by the regulation of the river Tisza in the early 19th century. The population decreased during the first and second World War.

In legal terms the old village of Tiszaszederkény and the new town of Tiszaújváros are the same: the village became a town in 1966 and was renamed twice: in 1970 it became Leninváros (Lenin Town) then in 1991 it received its present name Tiszaújváros (literally Tisza New Town, i.e. New Town on the Tisza River). In the second half of the 20th century, Tiszaszederkény got the "Town" title and became the 66th town of Hungary.

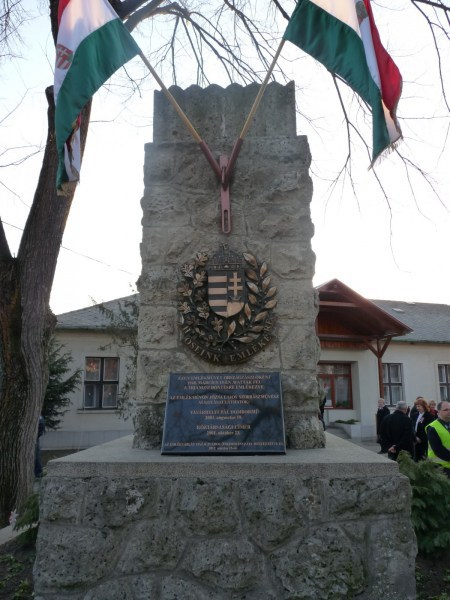
Hungarian national flag at the Column of Heroes, Tiszaszederkény

== History ==
The history of Tiszaszederkény goes back to the ancient times. The first humans were settled down 6,000 years ago, during the Neolithic period. The closeness of the river Tisza and the flat, fertile land provided a very good place to settle down. After the establishment of the county system, this dwelling-place and its neighbourhood became part of the Borsod county system. It was a good place to cross the river Tisza, so later the village functioned as a crossing-place.

1268 was the first time when Szederkény was mentioned in an official charter as "VILLA SCEDERKYN", and in 1319, it was referred to as "Villa Zederken". Under the reign of the Anjous, several estates were expropriated and gifted away. Because of this reason, the settlement got into the hands of Dózsa Debreceni and later into the hands of the Czudar family. However, the male line of the family died out in 1470, so the domain was acquired by the Rozgonyi family and later by Péter Perényi.

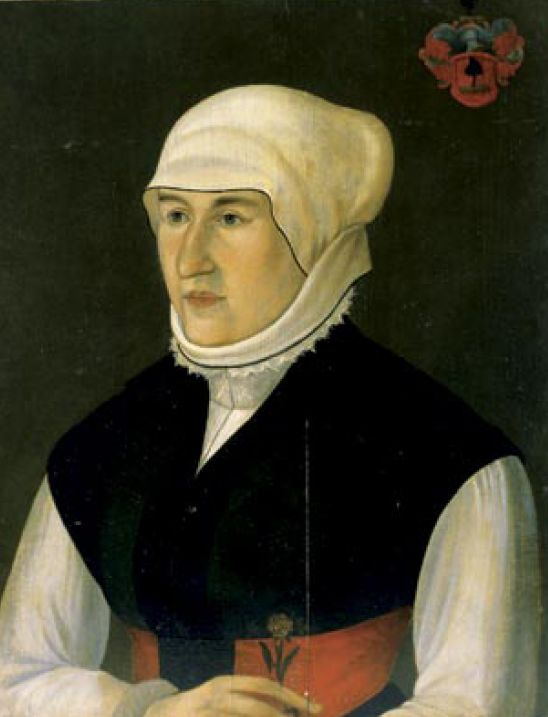
Zsuzsanna Lorántffy

During the Ottoman conquest, many people escaped from the village. Because of this decrease, the village was recorded as an extinct place in 1615 and 1616. Later, as a solution for populating the village, Zsuzsanna Lorántffy settled 32 Hajdu families here in 1651. Between 1670 and 1672, protestant pursuits and fightings were taking place to forcefully catholicize people, however, the villagers remained Protestant.

After 1767, based on the regularisation of copy-holders, ordered by Maria Theresa, the central government arrangements regulated the compilation of the Urbarium in a unitary manner. Copy-holder plate was attached to the urbarium, which included the names of landlords and villagers, their land, quantity and composition of their annual surrender. Urbarium of Szederkény was prepared and authenticated by József Ragályi and Joan Baroy de Fáy, on 14 June 1771. In 1898, it was decreed that all Hungarian village's name had to be regularised. The village was located close to river Tisza and its name was modified to Tiszaszederkény on 1 January 1905.

The World Wars demanded a lot from Tiszaszederkény, both lives and material losses. Thatched cottages disappeared and the old buildings were renewed. On 9 September 1955, the construction of a new town began in the outskirts of Tiszaszederkény, providing home for people working in the surrounding industrial plants. The local administration moved to the new town in 1961.

== Tourism ==
The village existed in the ancient times, however, there are not much historical buildings or museums. The "Villa Scederkyn" provincial house and a Reformed Church are waiting the visitors on every day. The first version of the Church was built in 1600 by wood, but later it was consecrated in 1799. The "Legyen Szerederkény vendége" event is a festival being held in every year. Nature lovers can visit the backwater under the dam, called "Morotva" which is located half-round the village. The floodplain fills up with water. As a result of the spring rains, the floodplain is filled with water, providing a home for highly protected wader/shorebird species: great egrets, grey herons, white and black storks, grebes have nesting places here.

== See also ==
- List of places in Hungary whose names were changed
- Planned community
- List of palatines of Hungary
