= Martin Krňávek =

Czech triathlete

Personal information
- Nationality: Czech
- Born: 11 April 1974 (age 52) Czech Republic

Sport
- Country: Czech Republic
- Sport: Triathlon

Martin Krňávek (born 11 April 1974) is a former Czech triathlete. He is the first Czech to win a race at the World Triathlon Cup. Apart from taking part in the triathlon in two Summer Olympic Games, Krňávek won bronze medals in two Europe Triathlon Championships.

== Career ==
Krňávek became the first Czech to win a race at the World Triathlon Cup, in 2000. He competed at the first Olympic triathlon at the 2000 Summer Olympics in Sydney. Where he took the thirteenth place with a total time of 1:49:38.01. Four years later, at the 2004 Summer Olympics in Athens, Krňávek competed again. He dropped to forty-second place with a time of 2:02:54.59. He was a substitute for the 2012 Summer Olympics in London, but did not race.

Krňávek twice won bronze medals at the Europe Triathlon Championships, from the 1999 event in Funchal, as well as the 2003 event in Czech city Karlovy Vary. He finished fourth in the 2006 event held in the French town of Autun, missing out on another medal with a thirteen-second gap to third place.

Krňávek finished third in the Hungary race of the 2010 ITU Triathlon World Cup, racing for the Brno Ekol team. He then placed fifth at the 2012 World Triathlon Long Distance Championships, held in the Spanish city of Vitoria-Gasteiz.

After finishing third in the 2012 Czech Republic national championship held in Brno, Krňávek announced his retirement from participation in triathlons.

== Personal life ==
Krňávek is married with two children. After retiring from triathlon, he focused his attention on his chocolate business.
