= Přemysl Švarc =

Czech triathlete (born 1985)

Přemysl Švarc (Czech pronunciation: [ˈpr̝̊ɛmɪsl̩ ˈʃvarts]; born 27 March 1985) is a Czech triathlete.

At the 2012 Summer Olympics men's triathlon on Tuesday 7 August, he placed 45th.
