= Andreas Giglmayr =

Austrian triathlete

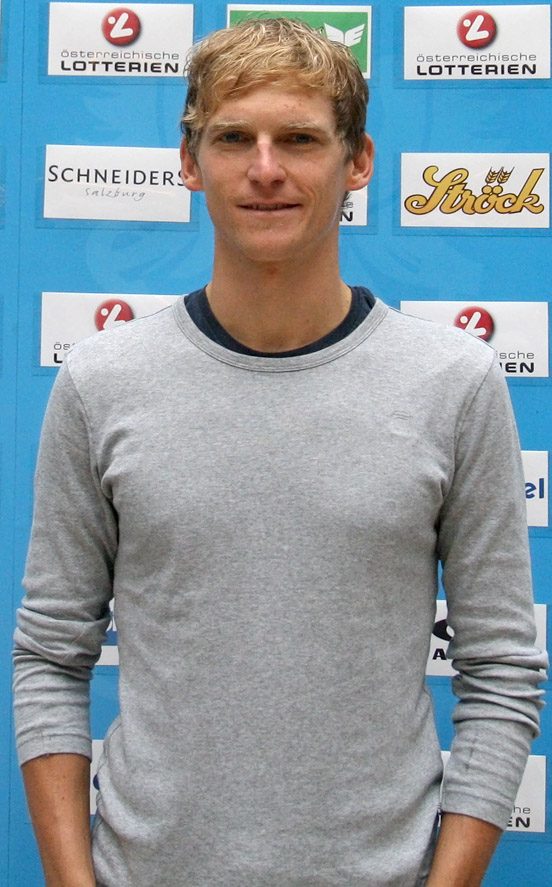

Andreas Giglmayr (born 7 February 1984) is an Austrian triathlete.

At the 2012 Summer Olympics men's triathlon, on Tuesday 7 August, he placed 40th.
