= Sarah-Anne Brault =

Canadian triathlete (born 1989)

Personal information
- Born: 1 December 1989 (age 36) Lévis, Quebec, Canada

Sport
- Country: Canada
- Sport: Triathlon

Sarah-Anne Brault (born 1 December 1989) is a Canadian triathlete. She finished in second place at the 2012 ITU Triathlon World Cup in Edmonton. In 2016, she was named in the Canadian Olympic team.
