= North West Triathlon Club =

North West Triathlon Club (NWTC) is based in Derry in Northern Ireland.

The club was formed in 1983 at Templemore Sports Complex in the city and hosts one of Ireland's longest running triathlon events, the Liam Ball Sprint triathlon. The event is named in memory of Irish Olympic swimmer Liam Ball, who represented Ireland in Mexico in 1968 and Munich in 1972, and died aged 32.

NWTC also hosts the annual firmus energy City of Derry Triathlon, a sprint with distance race which involves a swim in the fast flowing River Foyle with the cycle and run stages taking in Derry's three main road bridges.

International Triathlon Union World Series elite triathlete, Aileen Reid (née Morrison), who represented Ireland at the London 2012 Olympics, is a member of NWTC.

NWTC's motto is 'Swim, Bike, Run, Fun'.
