= Zuriñe Rodríguez =

Spanish triathlete

Personal information
- Born: 21 May 1982 (age 44) Barakaldo, Spain

Sport
- Sport: Triathlon

Zuriñe Rodríguez (born 21 May 1982) is a Spanish triathlete. She competed in the Women's event at the 2012 Summer Olympics.
