= Jan Čelůstka =

Czech triathlete

Jan Čelůstka (Czech pronunciation: [ˈjan ˈtʃɛluːstka]; born 22 March 1982) is a Czech triathlete.

At the 2012 Summer Olympics men's triathlon on Tuesday 7 August he placed 30th.
