= Bruno Pais =

Portuguese triathlete

Bruno Pais (born 10 June 1981) is a Portuguese triathlete who represents S.L. Benfica.

Pais finished 17th in the men's triathlon at the 2008 Summer Olympics. He placed 41st at the 2012 Summer Olympics men's triathlon, on 7 August.
