= Maximilian Schwetz =

German triathlete (born 1991)

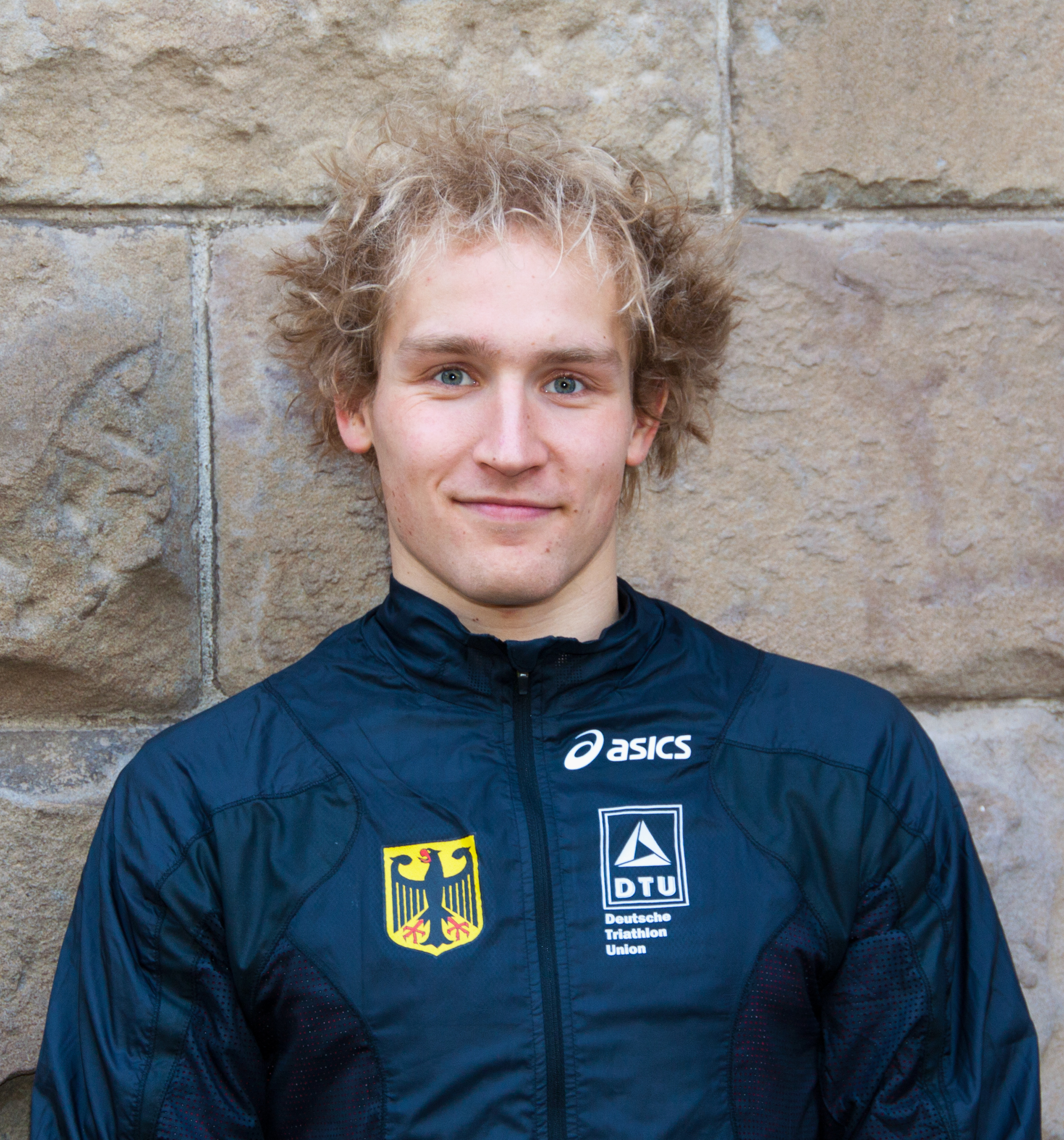
- Schwetz in 2013

Personal information
- Nickname: Max
- Born: 9 January 1991 (age 35) Erlangen, Germany
- Height: 1.83 m (6 ft 0 in)
- Weight: 72 kg (159 lb)

Sport
- Country: Germany
- Club: KiologIQ Team Saar
- Turned pro: 2013
- Coached by: Dan Lorang

Maximilian Schwetz (born 9 January 1991 in Erlangen, Germany) is a German triathlete and Member of the German national triathlon team.

== Results ==
Date	Rank	Competition	Place	Annotation
12 August 2017	3. place	ITU Triathlon World Cup	Mexico Yucatán	
7 August 2016	4. place	ITU Triathlon World Cup	Canada Montréal	
14 June 2015	2. place	ITU Triathlon World Cup	Mexico Huatulco	
12 September 2013	11. place	World Championships U23	United Kingdom London	
15 June 2013	4. place	ETU European Championships	Turkey Alanya	

On March 17, 2012, Schwetz set a new German national record in 1500 m. swimming for triathletes, coming in at 16:50.2 min.
