= Alessandro Fabian =

Italian triathlete (born 1988)

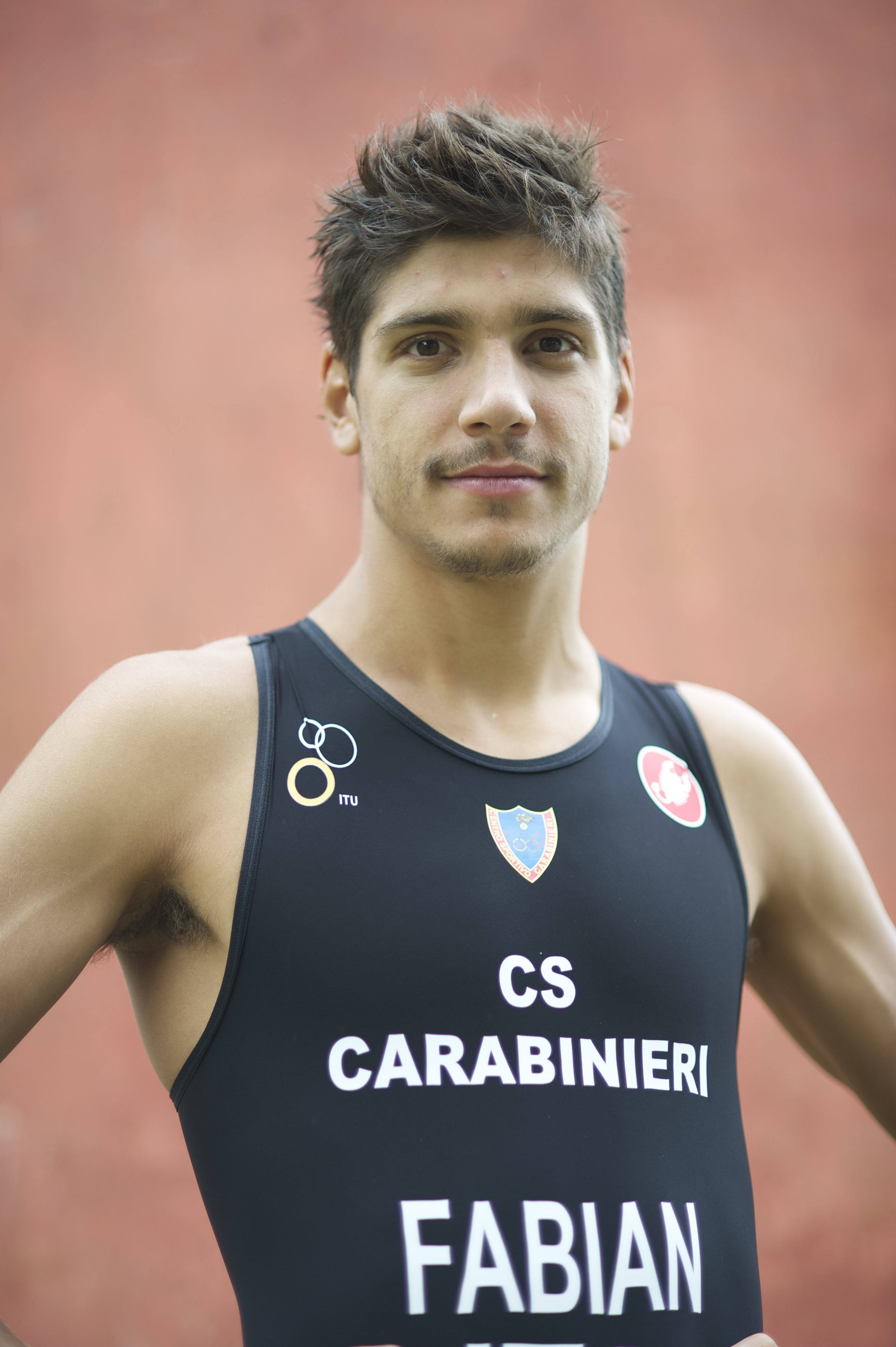

Personal information
- Nationality: Italian
- Born: 7 January 1988 (age 38) Padua, Italy
- Height: 1.86 m (6 ft 1 in)
- Weight: 75 kg (165 lb)

Sport
- Country: Italy
- Sport: Triathlon
- Club: C.S. Carabinieri

Alessandro Fabian (born 7 January 1988) is an Italian triathlete.

== Biography ==
At the 2012 Summer Olympics men's triathlon on Tuesday 7 August he placed tenth.

Fabian also competes in Super League Triathlon.
