= Brendan Sexton (triathlete) =

Australian triathlete

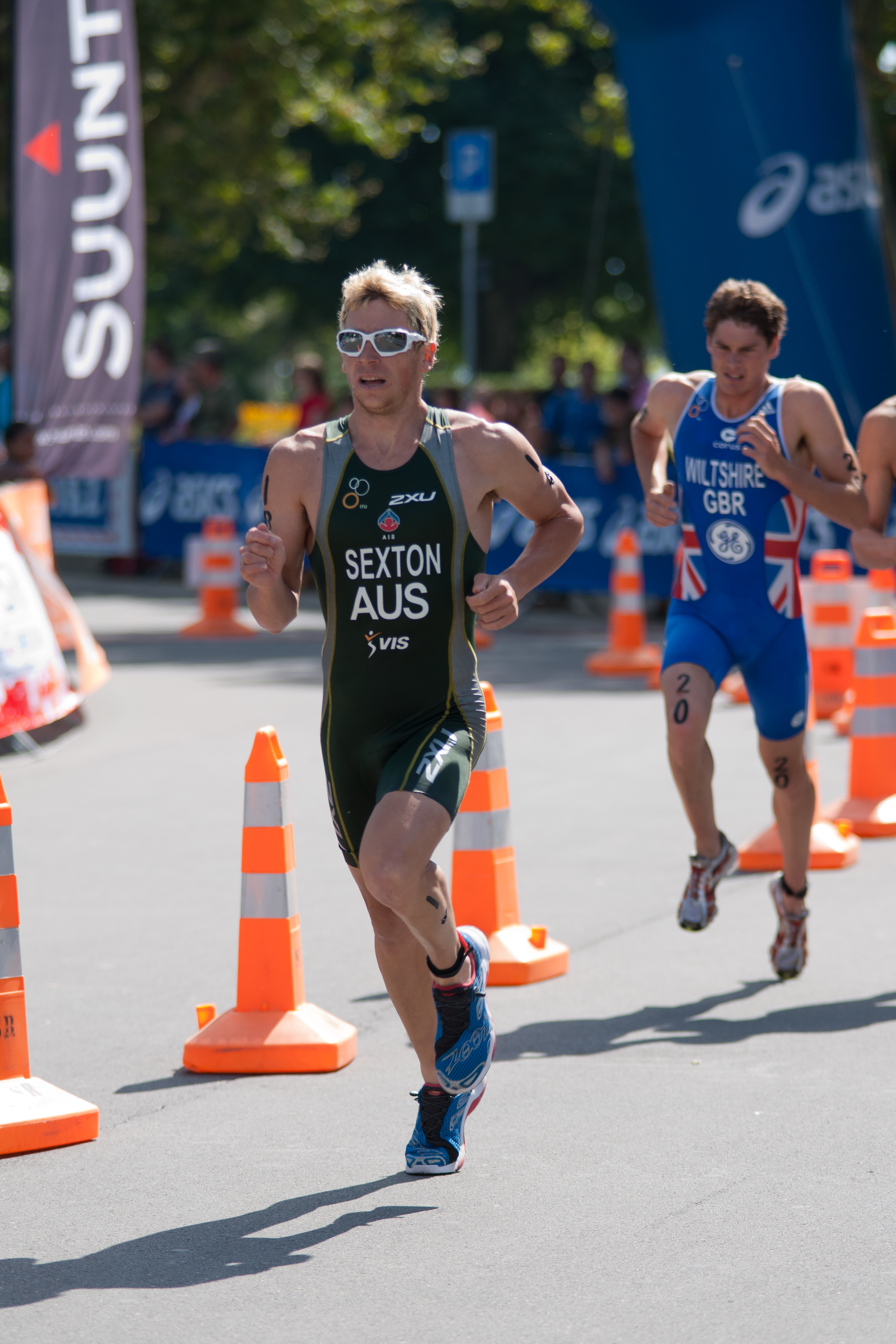
Sexton, 2010

Brendan Sexton (born 6 August 1985) is an Australian triathlete.

At the 2012 Summer Olympics men's triathlon on Tuesday, 7 August, he placed 35th.

Winner of the 2013 Liverpool, England Triathlon, the 2014 Liverpool was cancelled due to weather. Runner up in the 2015 triathlon in Liverpool, England.
