= Hunter Kemper =

American triathlete

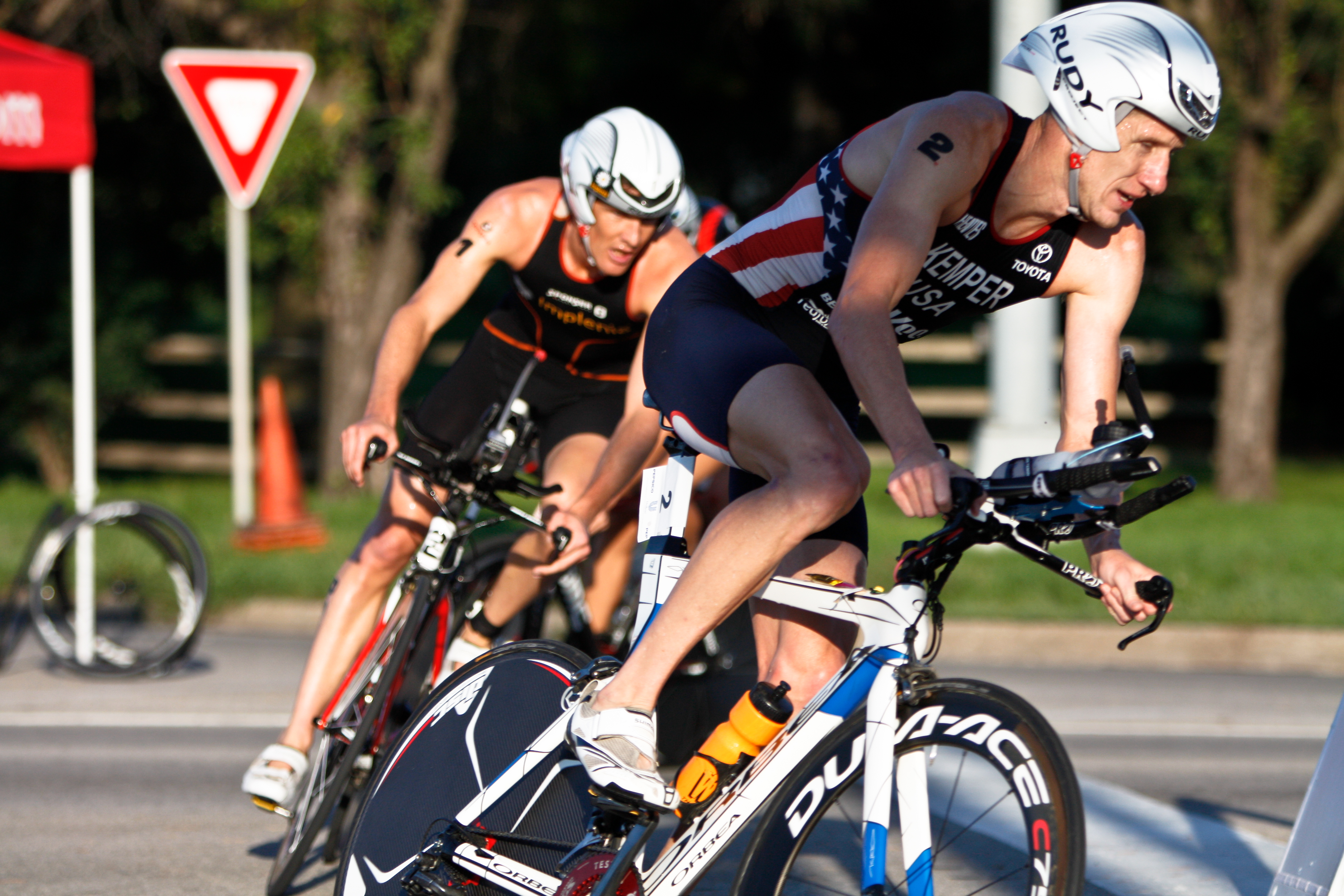
- Hunter Kemper in 2014

Personal information
- Born: May 4, 1976 (age 50) Charlotte, North Carolina, U.S.
- Home town: Colorado Springs, Colorado, U.S.
- Education: Wake Forest University
Medal record
Men's Triathlon
Representing the United States
Pan American Games
Gold medal – first place	2003 Santo Domingo	Individual
Silver medal – second place	1999 Winnipeg	Individual
ITU Triathlon World Cup
Gold medal – first place	2005 Gamagori	Individual

Hunter Craig Kemper (born May 4, 1976) is a triathlete from the United States. He won the silver medal at the 1999 Pan American Games, behind Venezuela's Gilberto González, followed by winning gold four years later at the 2003 Pan American Games. Kemper was on four U.S. Olympic teams as a triathlete, competing at the Summer Olympics in 2000, 2004, 2008, and 2012.

== College ==
He attended Wake Forest University in Winston-Salem, North Carolina, where he was a 4-year member of the Men's Cross Country and Track & Field teams. Kemper graduated in 1998 with a degree in Business Administration.

== Triathlete career ==
Kemper competed at the first Olympic triathlon at the 2000 Summer Olympics in Sydney. He took seventeenth place with a total time of 1:50:05.56.

Four years later, at the 2004 Summer Olympics in Athens, Kemper competed again. He moved up to ninth place with a time of 1:52:46.33 on the more rigorous course.

At the 2008 Summer Olympics in Beijing, he finished in seventh place with a time of 1:49:48.75.

At the ITU San Diego Triathlon in 2012, he placed fifth with a time of 1:49:18 qualifying him for the 2012 Summer Olympics in London for the USA Olympic team. He placed fourteenth in those games to lead the U.S. triathlon team.

Kemper is one of only two American male triathletes ever to be ranked world #1 by the International Triathlon Union (ITU) (American Mark Fretta also held the world #1 rank for 4 months in 2006). In July 2006, he won the Life Time Fitness Triathlon in Minneapolis, MN, winning what was at the time the largest purse in professional triathlon competition.
