= Davide Uccellari =

Italian triathlete (born 1991)

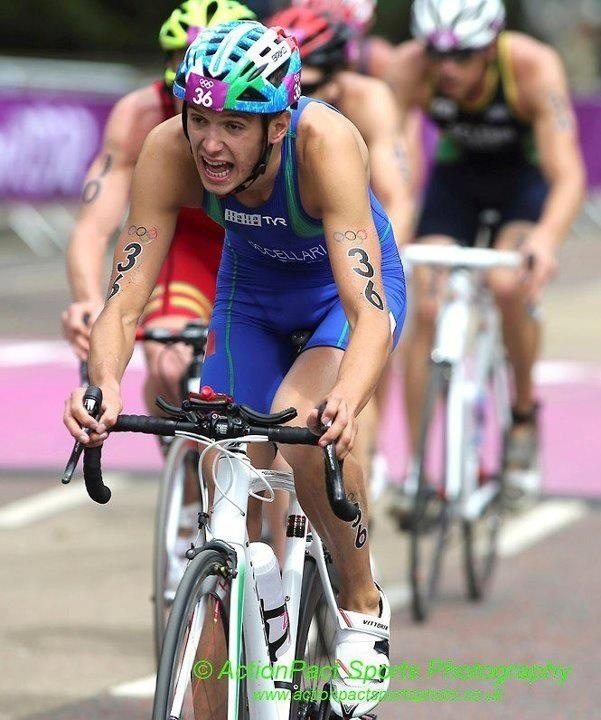

Personal information
- Nationality: Italian
- Born: October 11, 1991 (age 33)
- Height: 1.85 m (6 ft 1 in)
- Weight: 62 kg (137 lb)

Sport
- Country: Italy
- Sport: Triathlon
- Club: Fiamme Azzurre

Davide Uccellari (born 11 October 1991) is an Italian triathlete.

At the 2012 Summer Olympics men's triathlon on Tuesday, August 7, he placed 29th.
