= Aileen Morrison =

Irish triathlete

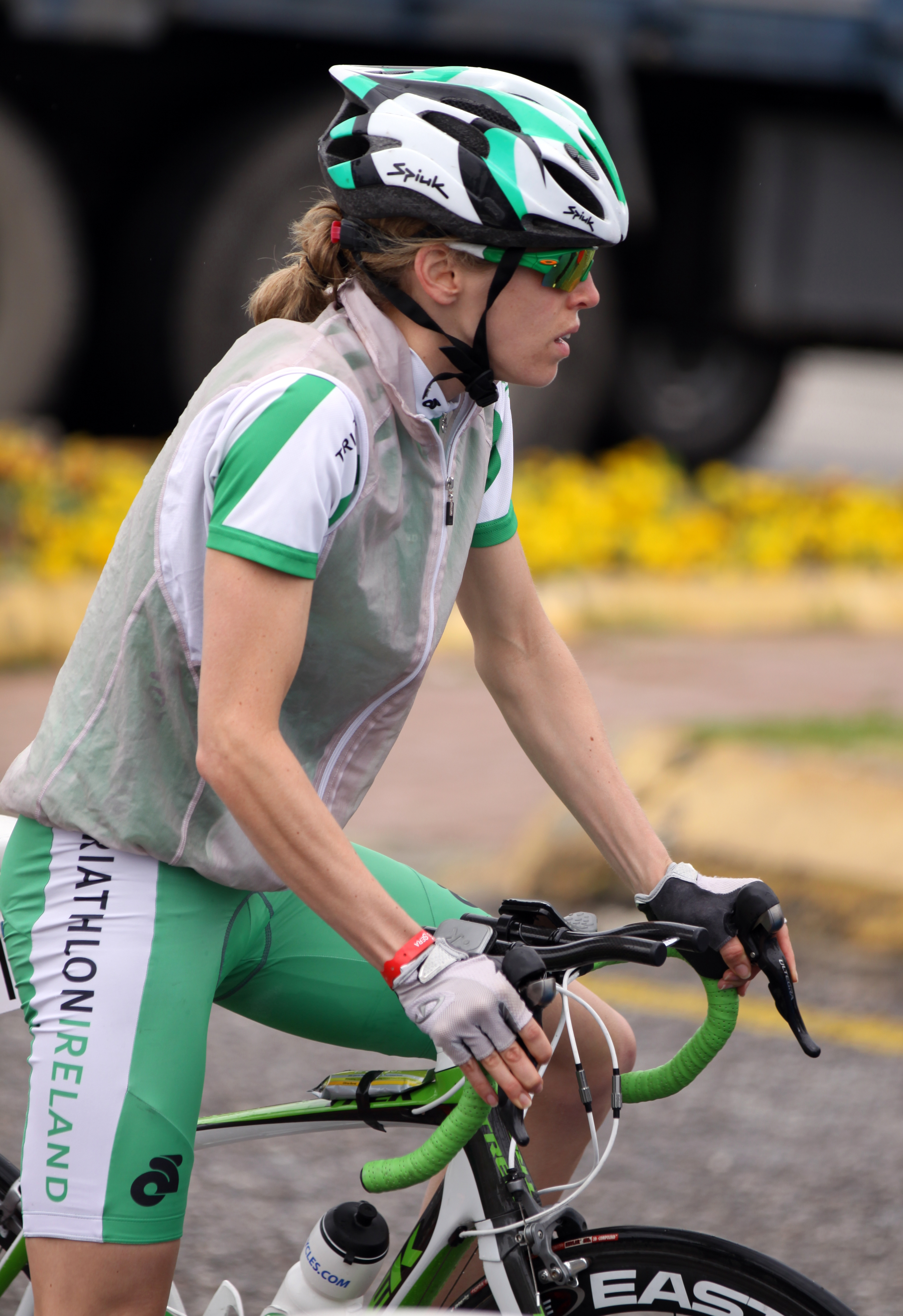
Aileen Morrison at the European Cup triathlon in Antalya, 2011.

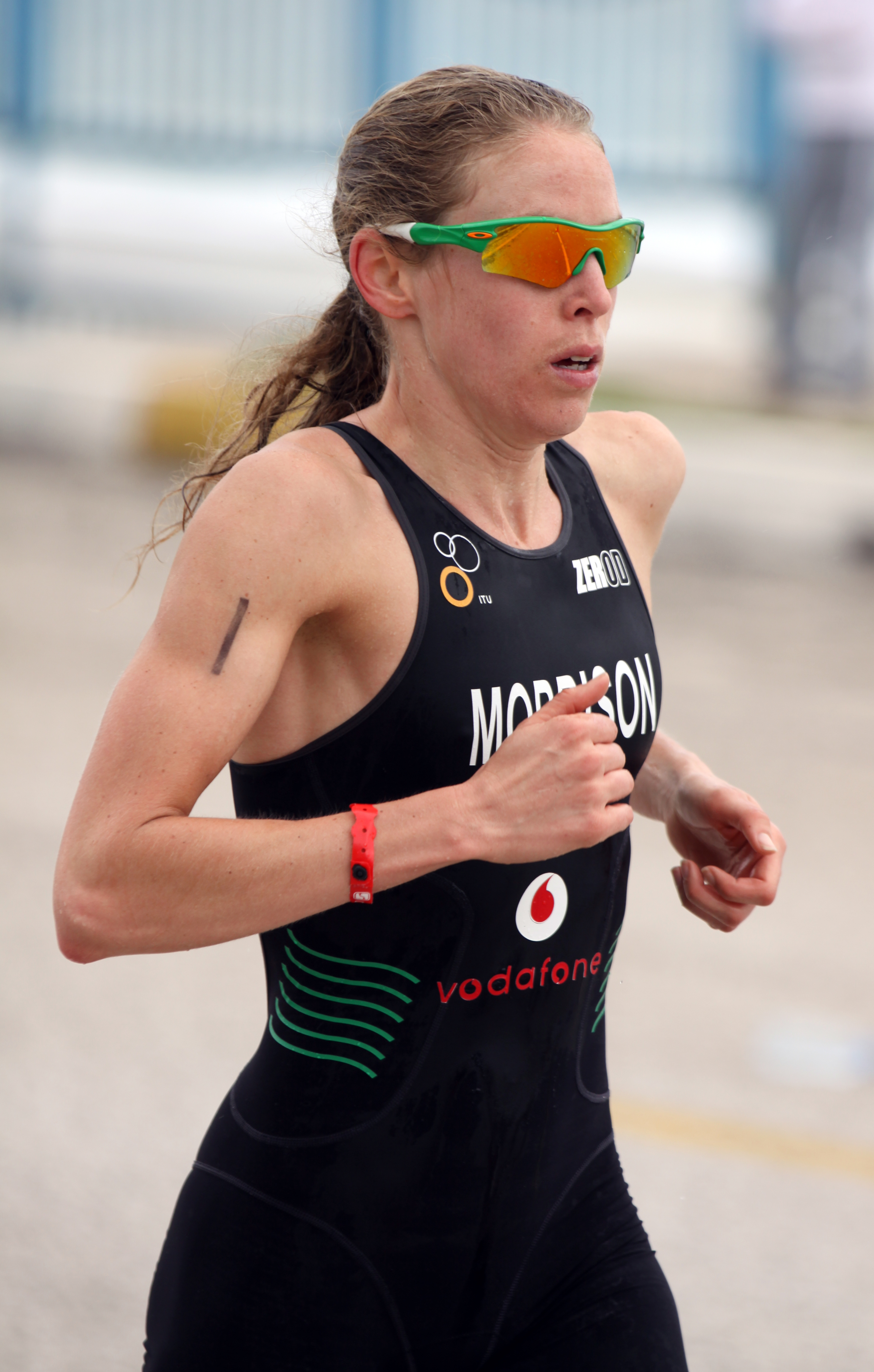
Aileen Morrison at the European Cup triathlon in Antalya, 2011.

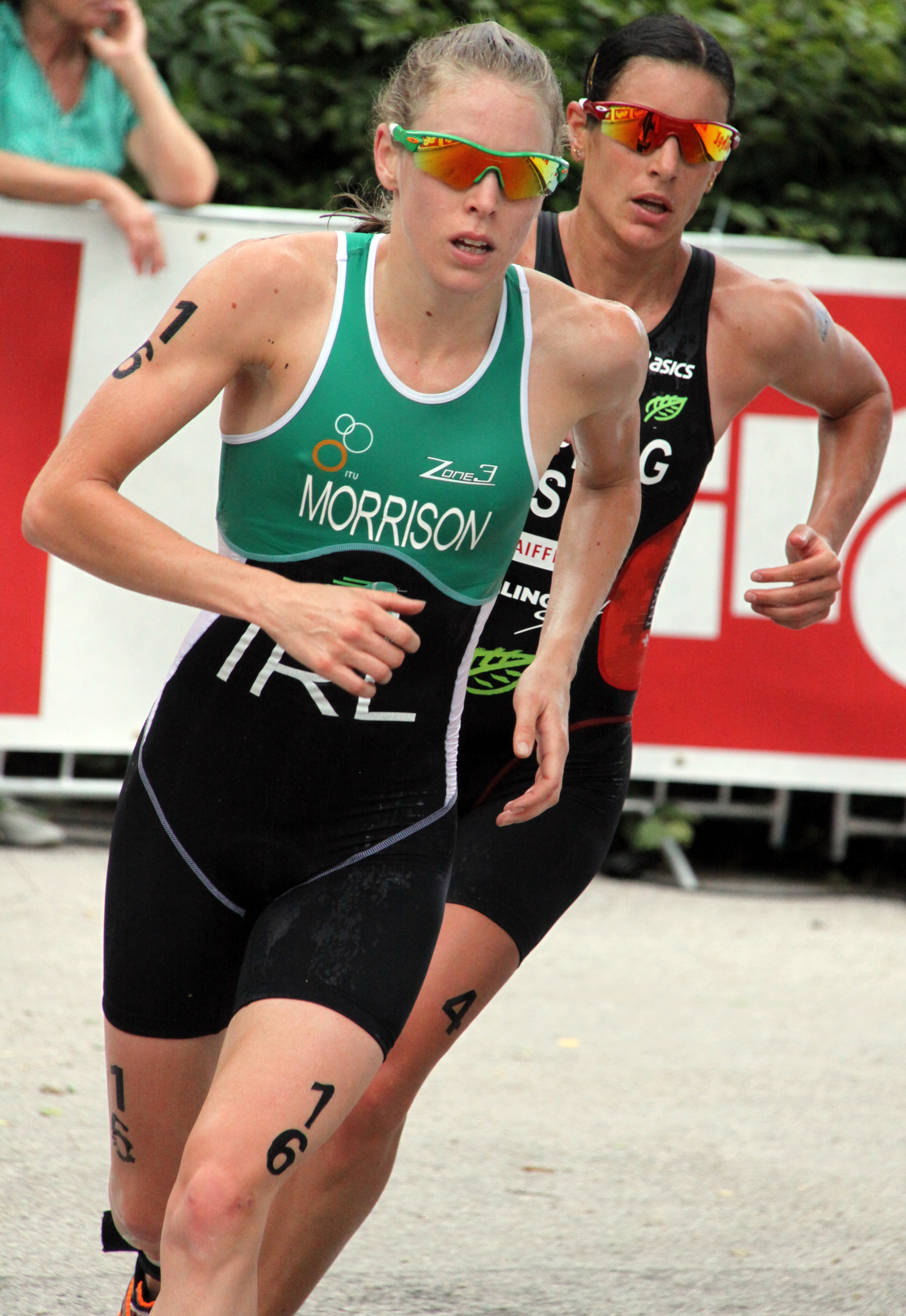
Aileen Morrison at the World Championship Triathlon in Kitzbühel, being chased by Nicola Spirig, 2010.

Aileen Reid (née Morrison; born 15 June 1982 in Derry, Northern Ireland) is a professional triathlete from Northern Ireland who represented Ireland at the London 2012 & Rio 2016 Olympics.

Reid represents the North West Triathlon Club and competes for French team Poissy.

Also an accomplished runner and swimmer, Reid is a former NI Cross country champion, and won a medal at the World University Cross Country championships with Team Ireland.

Aileen trained as a physical education teacher prior to beginning her triathlon career.

She competed in the Women's triathlon at the 2012 Summer Olympics, where she finished in a disappointing 43rd place, almost 10 minutes behind winner Nicola Spirig. Reid suffered a crash on the first lap of the bike course as a result of wet roads.

She married in October 2012, and raced under her married name thereafter.

She finished the 2013 season ranked 8th in the World, with a silver medal at the ITU World Triathlon Series Grand Final in London. She has had two other World triathlon series podiums with a silver medal in Madrid in June 2012, and Hamburg in July 2010.

Reid competed in the Women's triathlon at the Rio 2016 Olympics and finished in 21st place.

She retired in July 2017.

The following list is based upon the official ITU rankings and the Athlete's Profile Page. The following events are triathlons (Olympic Distance) and belong to the Elite category.

| Date | Competition | Place | Rank |
|---|---|---|---|
| 2008-05-18 | European Cup | Brno | 6 |
| 2008-06-27 | University Triathlon Championship | Erdek | 13 |
| 2008-07-12 | European Cup | Athlone | 6 |
| 2008-08-03 | European Cup | Egirdir | 7 |
| 2008-08-30 | European Cup | Split | 3 |
| 2008-09-13 | European Cup | Vienna | 12 |
| 2008-09-27 | BG World Cup | Lorient | 22 |
| 2009-04-05 | European Cup | Quarteira | 6 |
| 2009-05-02 | Dextro Energy World Championship Series | Tongeyong | 22 |
| 2009-06-21 | Dextro Energy World Championship Series | Washington DC | 25 |
| 2009-07-02 | European Championships | Holten | 13 |
| 2009-07-18 | European Cup | Athlone | 2 |
| 2009-08-15 | Dextro Energy World Championship Series | London | DNF |
| 2010-05-22 | European Cup | Senec | 6 |
| 2010-06-05 | Dextro Energy World Championship Series | Madrid | 23 |
| 2010-06-12 | Elite Cup | Hy-Vee | 27 |
| 2010-07-03 | European Championships | Athlone | 5 |
| 2010-07-17 | Dextro Energy World Championship Series | Hamburg | 3 |
| 2010-08-14 | Dextro Energy World Championship Series | Kitzbühel | 16 |
| 2010-09-08 | Dextro Energy World Championship Series, Grand Final | Budapest | 17 |
| 2010-10-16 | World Cup | Tongyeong | 4 |
| 2010-10-23 | Asian Cup | Hong Kong | 1 |
| 2011-04-03 | European Cup | Antalya | 1 |
| 2011-04-17 | World Cup | Ishigaki | 2 |

BG = the sponsor British Gas · DNF = did not finish
