= Simon De Cuyper =

Belgian triathlete

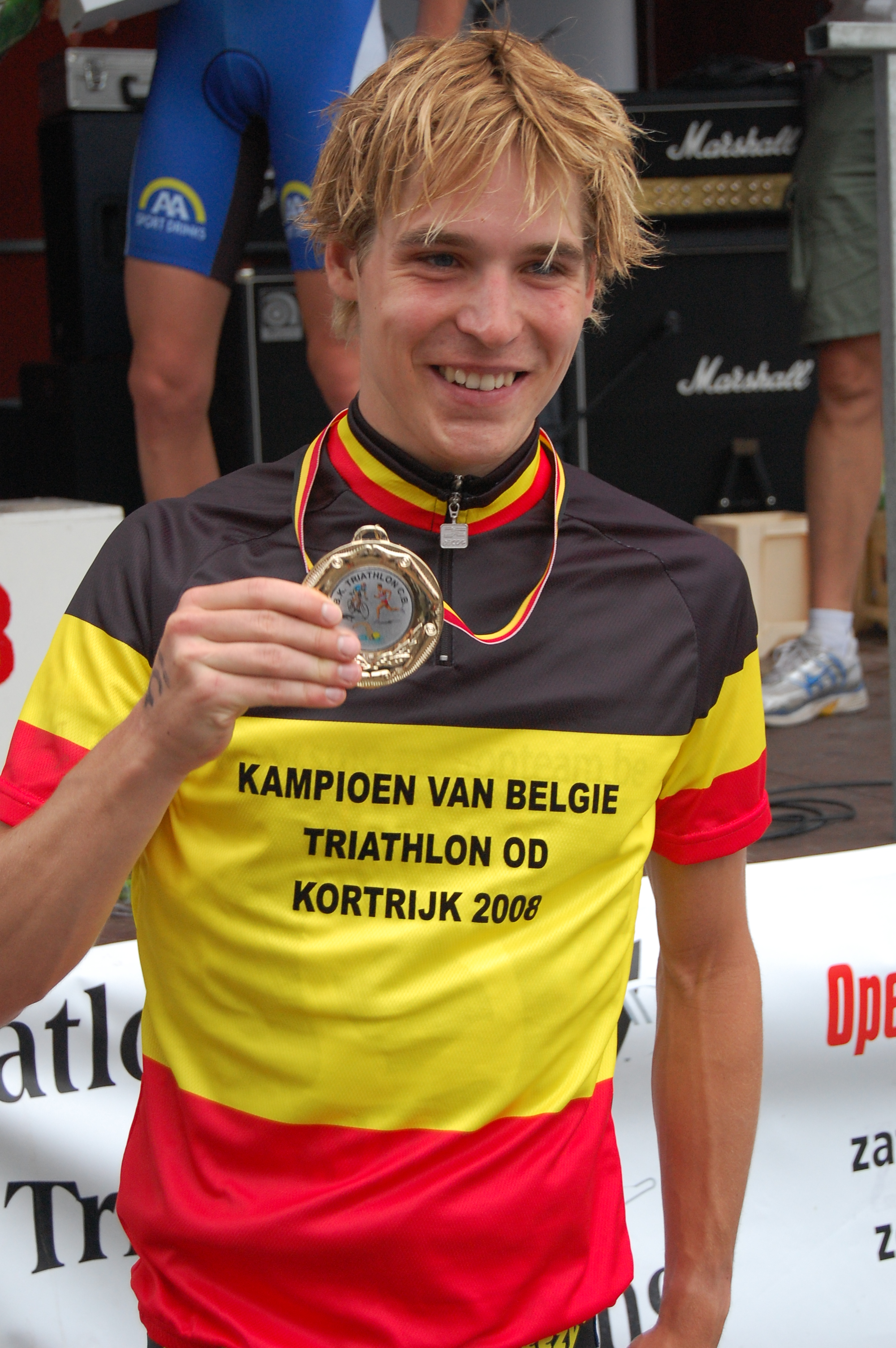
Simon De Cuyper in 2008

Simon De Cuyper (born 30 October 1986, Leuven) is a Belgian triathlete.

At the 2012 Summer Olympics men's triathlon on 7 August, he placed 26th.
