= Dmitry Polyanski =

Russian triathlete

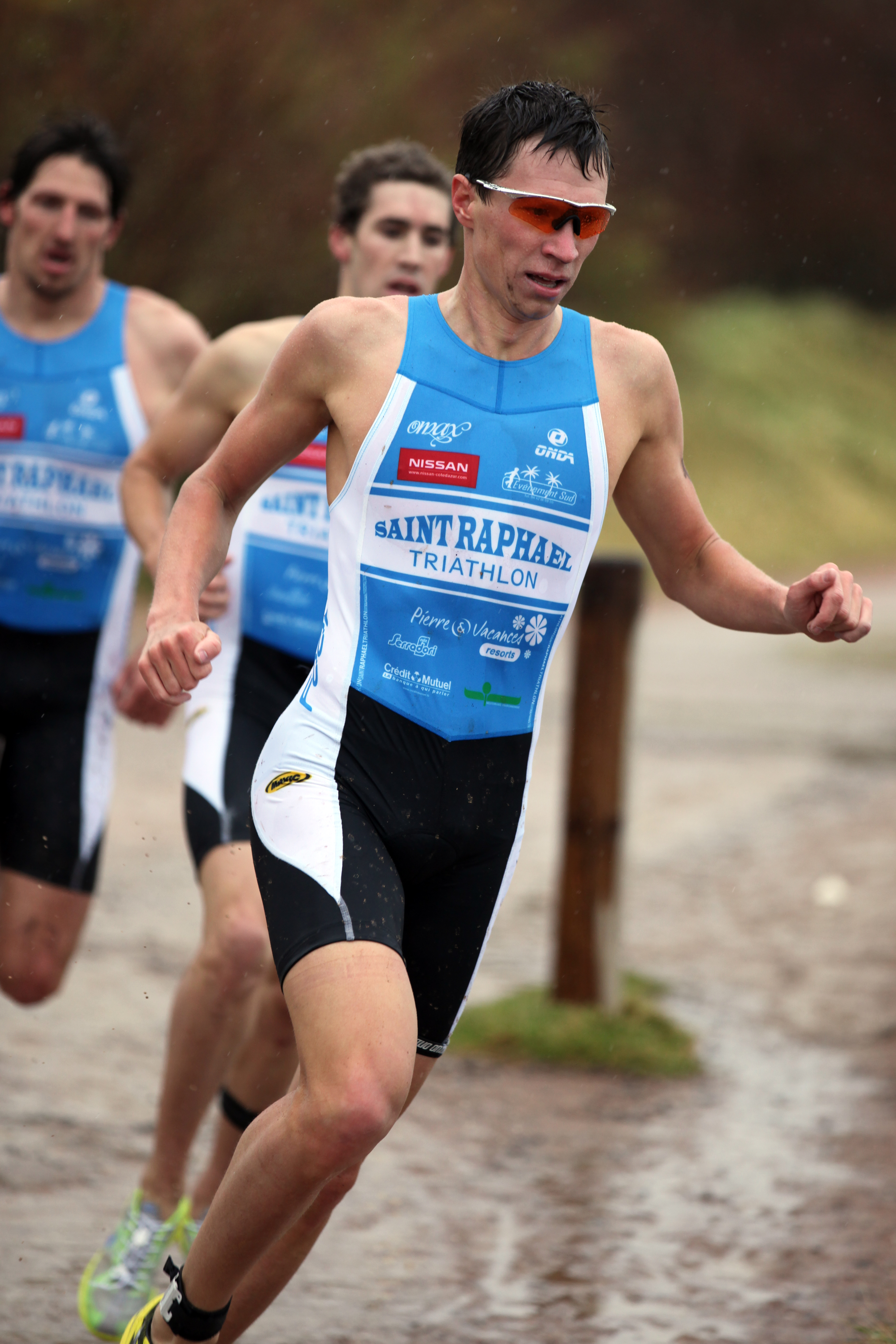
- Polyanski at the opening triathlon of the French Grand Prix in Les Sables d'Olonne, 2012

Personal information
- Native name: Дмитрий Андреевич Полянский
- Full name: Dmitry Andreyevich Polyanski
- National team: Russia
- Born: November 19, 1986 (age 39) Zheleznogorsk, Krasnoyarsk Krai, RSFSR, USSR (now Russia)
Medal record
Men's triathlon
Representing Russia
ITU World Championships
Bronze medal – third place	2012 Auckland	Individual
European Championships
Silver medal – second place	2014 Kitzbühel	Individual
Silver medal – second place	2016 Lisbon	Individual
Silver medal – second place	2011 Pontevedra	Individual

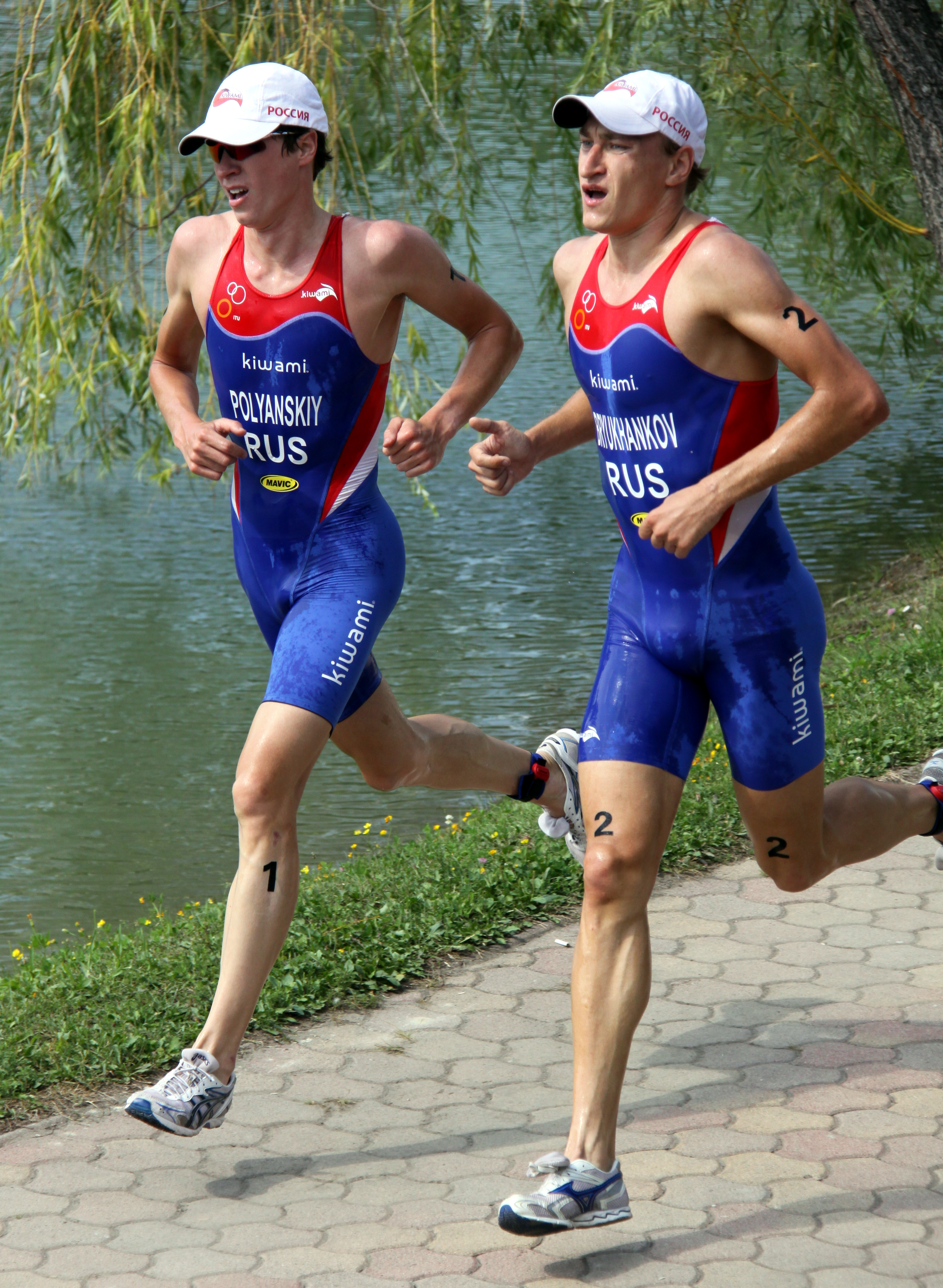
Dmitry Polyanski winning gold at the World Cup triathlon in Tiszaújváros, 2009.

Dmitry Andreyevich Polyanski (Russian: Дмитрий Андреевич Полянский, born 19 November 1986 in Zheleznogorsk, Krasnoyarsk Krai), is a Russian professional triathlete, 2009 U23 European Champion and permanent member of the National Elite Team. Polyanski is, together with Alexander Bryukhankov and Ivan Vasiliev, qualified for the London Olympics 2012.

In 2003 Polyanski took part in his first ITU competition in Győr and was also awarded the title Master of Sports (Мастер спорта). In 2007 he won the Russian Championship and the World Championship in the team category in Tiszaújváros. In 2009, Dmitry Polyanski won the bronze medal at the Russian Championships in Penza (Olympic Distance), in 2010 he gave precedence to the Elite Cup in Hy-Vee and did not take part in the competition in Penza.

In 2010, Polyanski also took part in the French Club Championship Series Lyonnaise des Eaux, representing the club Saint-Raphaël Tri. At the first triathlon of this circuit in Dunkirk, Polyanski placed 5th and was the best triathlete of his club, which placed 5th in the club ranking. Incidentally, among the five triathletes representing Saint-Raphaël Tri there was not even one French triathlete, a situation which was allowed in the year 2010 by the Réglementation Sportive but will be forbidden from 2010/2011 on, and was practically impossible up to the previous season. At the triathlon in Tourangeaux (29 August 2010) Polyanski placed 5th and at the Grand Final in La Baule (Triathlon Audencia, 18 September 2010) he placed 32nd.

Polyanski is the elder brother of Igor Polyanski, also a professional triathlete, representing Saint-Raphaël Tri. In 2007 Dmitry married the Ukrainian professional triathlete Anastasiya née Yatsenko, with whom he lives in Penza. In 2011, Dmitry, his wife, his brother and Igor's girl friend Lyubov Ivanovskaya will represent Saint-Raphaël Triathlon in the Club Championship Series Lyonnaise des Eaux.

== ITU Competitions ==
In the seven years from 2005 to 2011, Dmitry Polyanski took part in 74 ITU triathlons and achieved 41 top ten positions, among which 15 medals.

The following list is based upon the official ITU rankings and the Athlete's Profile Page. Unless indicated otherwise, all events are triathlons (Olympic Distance) and belong to the Elite category.

Date	Competition	Place	Rank
2005-07-23	European Championships (Junior)	Alexandroupoli(s)	DNF
2005-09-10	World Championships (Junior)	Gamagori	34
2005-10-26	Premium European Cup	Alanya	28
2006-07-30	Asian Cup	Burabay	3
2006-09-17	Asian Cup	Macau	6
2006-09-24	BG World Cup	Beijing	40
2006-10-14	Asian Cup	Hong Kong	8
2006-10-18	Premium European Cup	Alanya	DNS
2006-11-12	BG World Cup	New Plymouth	39
2007-03-03	African Cup	Langebaan	12
2007-04-15	BG World Cup	Ishigaki	40
2007-05-05	Asian Cup	Subic Bay	6
2007-05-12	Asian Cup (Elite)	Yicheng	2
2007-06-10	BG World Cup	Vancouver	12
2007-06-17	BG World Cup	Des Moines	25
2007-06-24	BG World Cup	Edmonton	11
2007-06-29	European Championships	Copenhagen	DNF
2007-07-21	European Championships (U23)	Kuopio	4
2007-07-29	BG World Cup	Salford	21
2007-08-11	BG World Cup	Tiszaújváros	6
2007-08-30	BG World Championships	Hamburg	DNF
2007-09-15	BG World Cup	Beijing	22
2007-10-07	BG World Cup	Rhodes	DNF
2007-11-04	BG World Cup	Cancun	10
2007-12-01	BG World Cup	Eilat	4
2008-03-30	BG World Cup	Mooloolaba	32
2008-04-06	BG World Cup	New Plymouth	21
2008-04-13	BG World Cup	Ishigaki	12
2008-04-26	BG World Cup	Tongyeong	17
2008-05-04	BG World Cup	Richards Bay	7
2008-05-25	BG World Cup	Madrid	15
2008-06-05	BG World Championships	Vancouver	11
2008-07-20	BG World Cup	Kitzbühel	12
2008-08-18	Olympic Games	Beijing	22
2008-09-06	European Championships (U23)	Pulpí	3
2008-09-27	BG World Cup	Lorient	8
2008-10-26	Premium European Cup	Alanya	1
2009-04-05	European Cup	Quarteira	1
2009-05-02	World Championship Series	Tongyeong	3
2009-05-17	Premium European Cup	Pontevedra	1
2009-05-31	World Championship Series	Madrid	7
2009-06-20	European Championships (U23)	Tarzo Revine	1
2009-07-02	European Championships	Holten	DNF
2009-07-11	World Championship Series	Kitzbühel	10
2009-07-25	World Championship Series	Hamburg	8
2009-08-09	World Cup	Tiszaújváros	1
2009-08-15	World Championships Series	London	12
2009-09-09	World Championship Series, Grand Final	Gold Coast	6
2009-10-10	Asian Cup	Palembang	2
2009-10-10	ASTC Aquathlon Asian Championships	Palembang	1
2009-10-17	Premium Asian Cup	Hong Kong	2
2009-10-25	Premium European Cup (Elite)	Alanya	DNF
2010-04-11	World Championship Series	Sydney	4
2010-05-08	World Championship Series	Seoul	6
2010-06-05	World Championship Series	Madrid	8
2010-06-12	Elite Cup	Hy-Vee	7
2010-07-03	European Championships	Athlone	DNF
2010-07-17	World Championship Series	Hamburg	44
2010-08-14	World Championship Series	Kitzbuhel	48
2010-09-08	World Championship Series, Grand Final	Budapest	49
2010-10-24	Premium European Cup	Alanya	6
2011-04-09	World Championship Series	Sydney	10
2011-06-04	World Championship Series	Madrid	5
2011-06-18	World Championship Series	Kitzbuhel	8
2011-06-24	European Championships	Pontevedra	3
2011-06-26	European Championships (Elite Mix Relay)	Pontevedra	4
2011-07-03	European Cup	Penza	3
2011-07-16	World Championship Series	Hamburg	11
2011-08-06	World Championship Series	London	13
2011-08-20	Sprint World Championship	Lausanne	DNF
2011-08-20	Sprint World Championship (Mixed Relay)	Lausanne	10
2011-09-09	World Championship Series, Grand Final	Beijing	4
2011-09-19	World Championship Series	Yokohama	3
2011-10-15	World Cup	Tongyeong	1
2011-10-29	European Cup	Eilat	3
2012-04-14	World Triathlon Series	Sydney	9
2012-04-20	European Championships (Mixed Relay)	Eilat	1
2012-06-24	European Championships	Eilat	8
2012-05-26	World Triathlon Series	Madrid	3
2012-06-17	World Cup	Banyoles	

BG = the sponsor British Gas · DNF = did not finish · DNS = did not start
