= Annamaria Mazzetti =

Italian triathlete

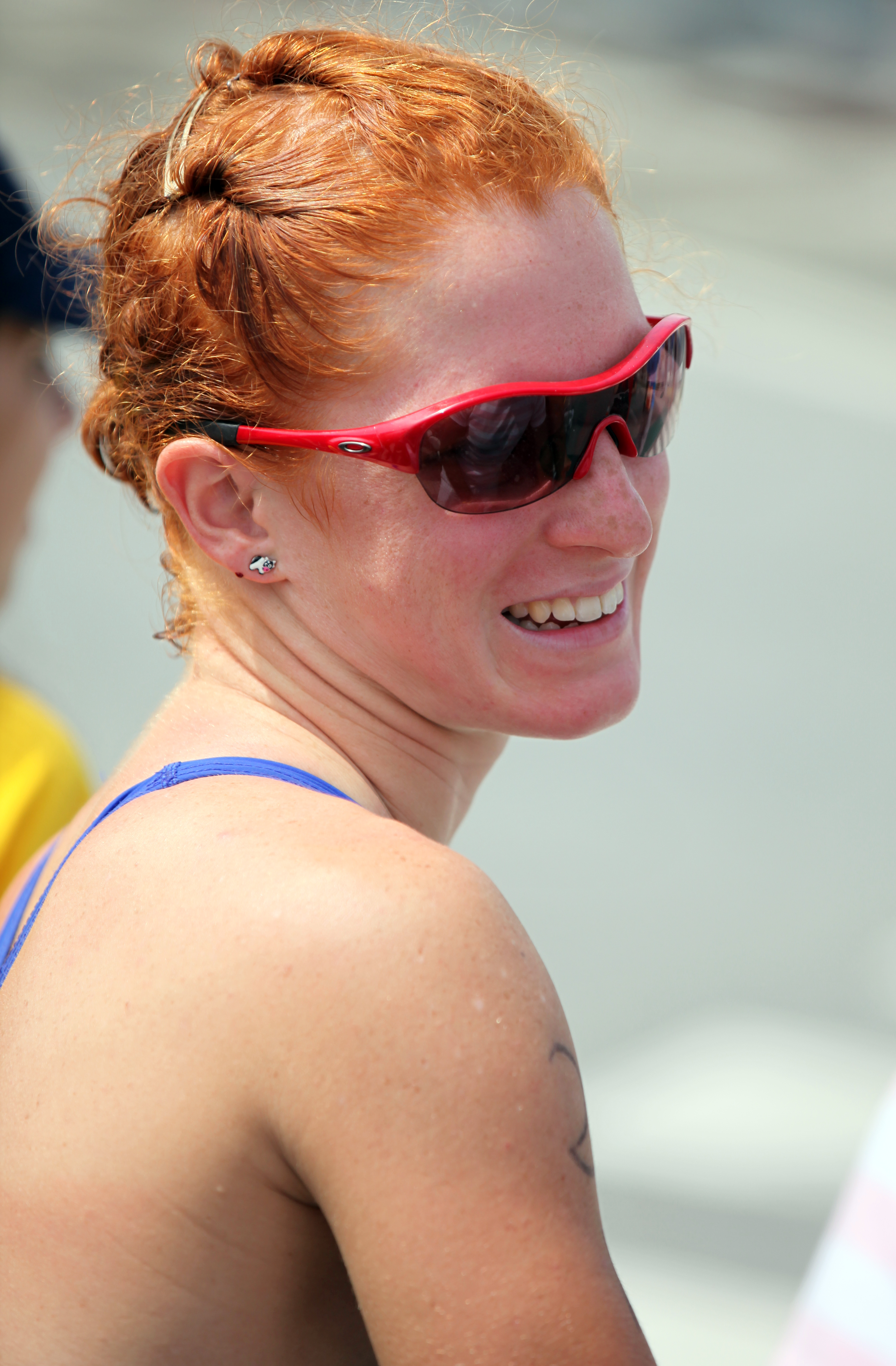
Annamaria Mazzetti, bronze medalist at the European Championships in Pontevedra, 2011

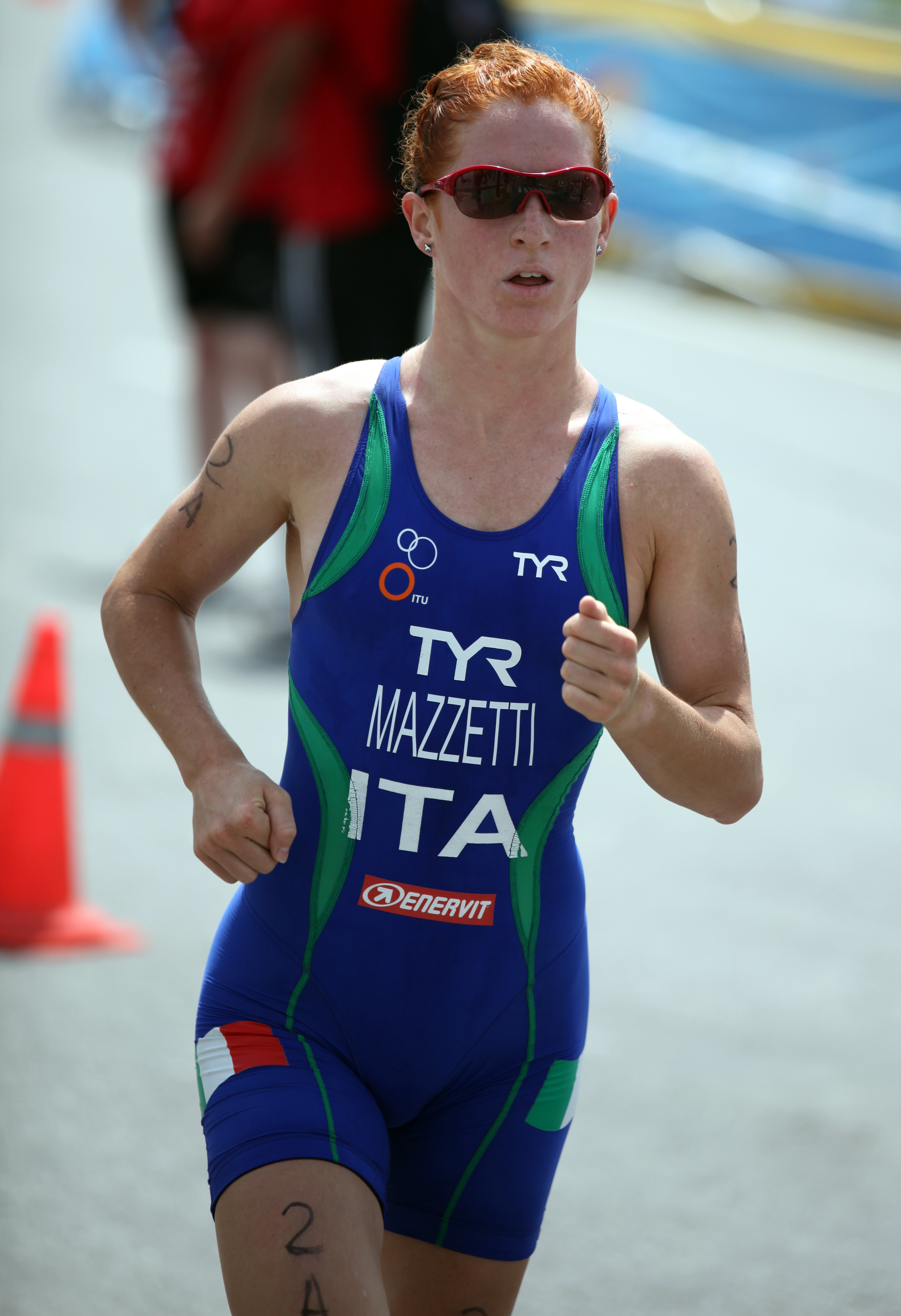
Annamaria Mazzetti running for bronze at the European Championships in Pontevedra, 2011.

Annamaria Mazzetti (born 25 August 1988 in Magenta, Lombardy, Provincia di Milano) is an Italian professional triathlete and 2009 National Champion in three categories (Duathlon Sprint, Triathlon Sprint, Olympic Distance).

In 2007, Mazzetti won the Italian Championships in all Junior categories (Aquathlon, Duathlon, Triathlon); in 2008, she won the gold medal at the Italian U23 Championships. In 2010, she won the bronze medal at the European U23 Championships, and in Italy, she was considered one of the most promising Olympic hopes for London 2012.

In Italy, like Daniela Chmet, Mazzetti represents the Police Club GS Fiamme Oro, after she had been a member of the Friesian Team, and lives in Cesate.

She competed in the women's event at the 2012 and 2016 Summer Olympics, finishing in 46th and 29th place respectively.

== ITU Competitions ==
In the seven years from 2004 to 2010, Mazzetti took part in 30 ITU competitions and achieved 19 top-ten positions. In 2011, Mazzetti won the bronze medal at the European Championships. Apart from Nadia Cortassa, Mazzetti is the first Italian triathlete to win a medal at the European Championships. The following list is based upon the official ITU rankings and the ITU Athletes's Profile Page. Unless indicated otherwise, the following events are triathlons (Olympic Distance) and refer to the Elite category.

Date	Competition	Place	Rank
2004-07-03	European Championships (Junior)	Lausanne	14
2005-07-23	European Championships (Junior)	Alexandroupoli(s)	10
2005-07-24	European Championships (Junior Women Relay)	Alexandroupoli(s)	2
2005-09-08	Aquathlon World Championships	Gamagori	6
2005-09-10	World Championships (Junior)	Gamagori	4
2006-06-23	European Championships (Junior)	Autun	7
2006-07-08	Junior European Cup	Rijeka	1
2006-07-30	Junior European Cup	Salford	2
2006-08-12	Junior European Cup	Tiszaújváros	DNS
2006-09-02	World Championships (Junior)	Lausanne	18
2006-10-07	Duathlon European Championships (Junior)	Rimini	2
2007-05-19	Duathlon World Championships (Junior)	Győr	4
2007-06-29	European Championships (Junior)	Copenhagen	12
2007-08-12	Junior European Cup	Tiszaújváros	2
2007-08-30	BG World Championships (Junior)	Hamburg	32
2008-04-19	Premium European Cup	Pontevedra	DNF
2008-06-27	9th World University Triathlon Championship	Erdek	17
2009-06-20	European Championships (U23)	Tarzo Revine	4
2009-08-23	European Cup	Karlovy Vary (Carlsbad)	4
2009-09-09	Dextro Energy World Championship Series, Grand Final: U23 World Championships	Gold Coast	7
2010-01-10	Pan American Cup	Viña del Mar	12
2010-01-15	Pan American Cup	La Paz	4
2010-04-17	European Cup	Antalya	7
2010-05-28	FISU 10th World University Championships	Valencia	3
2010-06-05	Dextro Energy World Championship Series	Madrid	21
2010-07-03	European Championships	Athlone	8
2010-07-10	World Cup	Holten	2
2010-08-14	Dextro Energy World Championship Series	Kitzbuhel	47
2010-08-21	Sprint World Championships	Lausanne	12
2010-08-28	European Championships (U23)	Vila Nova de Gaia (Porto)	3
2010-09-08	Dextro Energy World Championship Series, Grand Final: U23 World Championship	Budapest	31
2011-01-16	Pan American Cup	La Paz	2
2011-03-26	World Cup	Mooloolaba	DNF
2011-04-09	Dextro Energy World Championship Series	Sydney	46
2011-06-04	Dextro Energy World Championship Series	Madrid	DNF
2011-06-12	Sprint European Cup	Cremona	3
2011-06-18	Dextro Energy World Championship Series	Kitzbuhel	44
2011-06-24	European Championships	Pontevedra	3
