= Tiszaújváros =

- Town
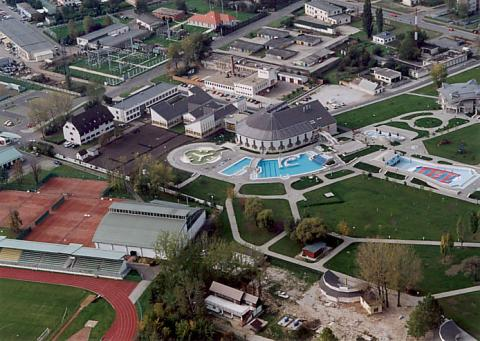
- Aerial view

- Flag Coat of arms

- Location within Hungary
- Coordinates: 47.92281°N 21.05219°E
- Country: Hungary
- County: Borsod-Abaúj-Zemplén
- District: Tiszaújváros

Area
  - Total: 46.04 km^{2} (17.78 sq mi)

Population (2009)
  - Total: 18,021
  - Density: 391.4/km^{2} (1,014/sq mi)
- Time zone: UTC+1 (CET)
  - Summer (DST): UTC+2 (CEST)
- Postal code: 3580
- Area code: (+36) 49
- Website: www.tiszaujvaros.hu

Tiszaújváros (Hungarian pronunciation: [ˈtisɒuːjvaːroʃ]; Slovak: Nové Mesto nad Tisou) is an industrial town in Borsod-Abaúj-Zemplén county, Northern Hungary, 35 km (22 mi) south-east of Miskolc, near the river Tisza.

== History ==
The town was built up on the outskirts of the old village Tiszaszederkény. In legal terms the old village and the new town are the same: the village became a town in 1966 and was renamed twice, in 1970 and in 1991.

== Twin towns – sister cities ==
Tiszaújváros is twinned with:

- Berehove, Ukraine
- Dexing, China
- Friesenheim (Ludwigshafen), Germany
- Miercurea Ciuc, Romania
- Neuhofen an der Krems, Austria
- Rimavská Sobota, Slovakia
- Świętochłowice, Poland
- Zawiercie County, Poland

== Gallery ==
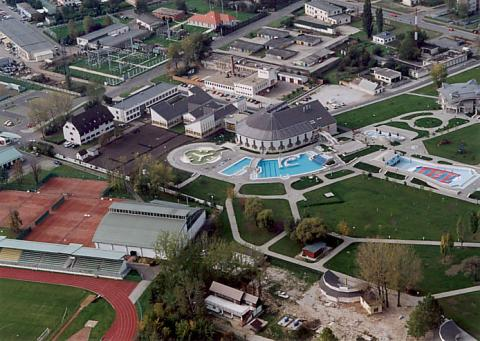

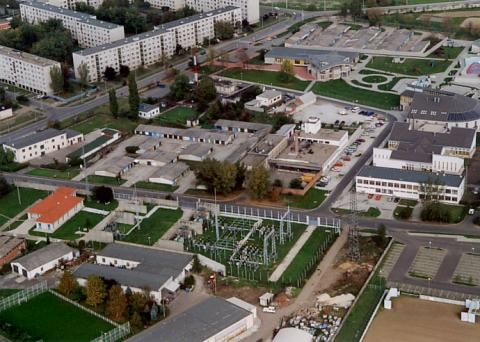

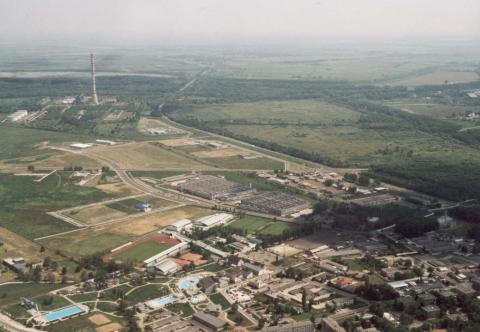

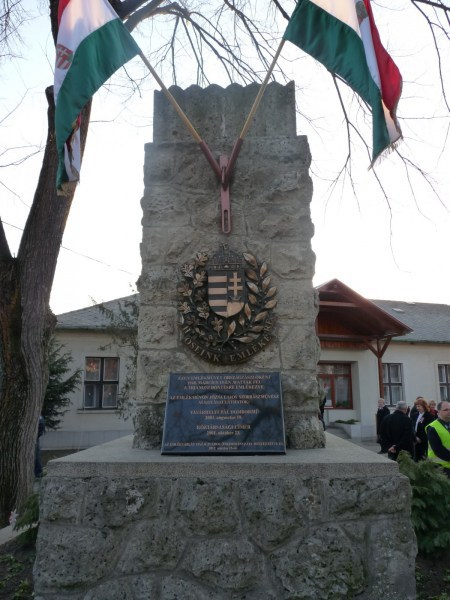
