= Triathlon at the 2016 Summer Olympics – Qualification =

This article details the qualifying phase for triathlon at the 2016 Summer Olympics. The competition at these Games will comprise a total of 110 athletes coming from their respective NOCs; each has been allowed to enter a maximum of three for the first eight NOCs, while the remaining nations are limited to two. All athletes must undergo a qualifying process to earn a spot for the Games through the Continental Qualification Events, the World Qualification Event, and then the Olympic Qualification List that begin on May 15, 2014, and then conclude two years later on the same date.

The winners of each of the five Continental Qualification Events are selected to compete for the Games, followed by the top three finishers at the 2015 ITU World Qualification Event in Rio de Janeiro, Brazil. Thirty-nine athletes for each gender must directly qualify through the Olympic Qualification List as of May 15, 2016, ensuring that the first eight NOCs qualifying for positions are subjected to a maximum of three, and then the remaining NOCs to a limit to two. Host nation Brazil has guaranteed a single place for each gender, while further two berths are made available to NOCs through a Tripartite Invitation Commission. In the end, further five places are distributed to the NOCs without any quota through the ITU Points List.

== Summary ==
NOC	Men	Women	Total
Argentina	2	0	2
Australia	3	3	6
Austria	1	2	3
Azerbaijan	1	0	1
Barbados	1	0	1
Belgium	2	2	4
Bermuda	0	1	1
Brazil	1	1	2
Canada	2	3	5
Chile	0	1	1
China	1	1	2
Costa Rica	1	0	1
Czech Republic	0	1	1
Denmark	1	0	1
Ecuador	0	1	1
Estonia	0	1	1
France	3	2	5
Germany	2	3	5
Great Britain	3	3	6
Hungary	2	2	4
Ireland	1	1	2
Israel	1	0	1
Italy	2	2	4
Japan	1	3	4
Jordan	1	0	1
Mauritius	0	1	1
Mexico	3	2	5
Netherlands	0	2	2
New Zealand	2	3	5
Poland	0	1	1
Portugal	3	0	3
Russia	3	2	5
Slovakia	1	0	1
Slovenia	0	1	1
South Africa	2	2	4
Spain	3	3	6
Sweden	0	1	1
Switzerland	2	1	3
Ukraine	1	1	2
United States	3	3	6
Total: 38 NOCs	56	56	112

== Timeline ==
Event	Date	Venue
World Qualification Event	August 1–2, 2015	(Brazil) Rio de Janeiro
2015 European Games	June 13–14, 2015	(Azerbaijan) Baku
2015 Pan American Games	July 11–12, 2015	(Canada) Toronto
2016 Oceania Triathlon Championships	March 19–20, 2016	(New Zealand) Gisborne
2016 African Triathlon Championships	March 20, 2016	(South Africa) East London
2016 Asian Triathlon Championships	April 29 – May 1, 2016	(Japan) Hatsukaichi
Cutoff for World Rankings	May 15, 2016	
Re-allocation of unused quotas	June 13, 2016	

== Men's event ==
Event	Places	Qualified NOC	Selected triathlete
2015 European Games	1	Great Britain	Gordon Benson
2016 African Championships	0*	~~South Africa~~^{[1]}	
2016 Asian Championships	1	Japan	Hirokatsu Tayama
2016 Oceania Championships	1	Australia	Ryan Bailie
2015 Pan American Games	1	Mexico	Crisanto Grajales
ITU World Qualification Event	2	France	Vincent Luis
ITU World Qualification Event	2	South Africa	Richard Murray
ITU Olympic Qualification List (as of May 15, 2016)	38	Spain	Mario Mola
ITU Olympic Qualification List (as of May 15, 2016)	38	Spain	Fernando Alarza
ITU Olympic Qualification List (as of May 15, 2016)	38	Portugal	João José Pereira
ITU Olympic Qualification List (as of May 15, 2016)	38	Great Britain	Alistair Brownlee
ITU Olympic Qualification List (as of May 15, 2016)	38	Great Britain	Jonathan Brownlee
ITU Olympic Qualification List (as of May 15, 2016)	38	Australia	Ryan Fisher
ITU Olympic Qualification List (as of May 15, 2016)	38	Russia	Dmitry Polyanski
ITU Olympic Qualification List (as of May 15, 2016)	38	South Africa	Henri Schoeman
ITU Olympic Qualification List (as of May 15, 2016)	38	Spain	Vicente Hernández
ITU Olympic Qualification List (as of May 15, 2016)	38	Australia	Aaron Royle
ITU Olympic Qualification List (as of May 15, 2016)	38	France	Pierre Le Corre
ITU Olympic Qualification List (as of May 15, 2016)	38	Switzerland	Sven Riederer
ITU Olympic Qualification List (as of May 15, 2016)	38	Italy	Alessandro Fabian
ITU Olympic Qualification List (as of May 15, 2016)	38	Russia	Igor Polyanski
ITU Olympic Qualification List (as of May 15, 2016)	38	Portugal	João Silva
ITU Olympic Qualification List (as of May 15, 2016)	38	Russia	Alexander Bryukhankov
ITU Olympic Qualification List (as of May 15, 2016)	38	Azerbaijan	Rostyslav Pevtsov
ITU Olympic Qualification List (as of May 15, 2016)	38	United States	Joe Maloy
ITU Olympic Qualification List (as of May 15, 2016)	38	France	Dorian Coninx
ITU Olympic Qualification List (as of May 15, 2016)	38	Slovakia	Richard Varga
ITU Olympic Qualification List (as of May 15, 2016)	38	New Zealand	Ryan Sissons
ITU Olympic Qualification List (as of May 15, 2016)	38	Norway	Kristian Blummenfelt
ITU Olympic Qualification List (as of May 15, 2016)	38	Mexico	Irving Perez
ITU Olympic Qualification List (as of May 15, 2016)	38	Hungary	Gäbor Faldum
ITU Olympic Qualification List (as of May 15, 2016)	38	Switzerland	Andrea Salvisberg
ITU Olympic Qualification List (as of May 15, 2016)	38	Belgium	Jelle Greens
ITU Olympic Qualification List (as of May 15, 2016)	38	United States	Gregory Billington
ITU Olympic Qualification List (as of May 15, 2016)	38	Belgium	Martin van Riel
ITU Olympic Qualification List (as of May 15, 2016)	38	Italy	Davide Uccellari
ITU Olympic Qualification List (as of May 15, 2016)	38	Argentina	Gonzalo Tellechea
ITU Olympic Qualification List (as of May 15, 2016)	38	New Zealand	Tony Dodds
ITU Olympic Qualification List (as of May 15, 2016)	38	Canada	Andrew Yorke
ITU Olympic Qualification List (as of May 15, 2016)	38	United States	Ben Kanute
ITU Olympic Qualification List (as of May 15, 2016)	38	Costa Rica	Leonardo Chacón
ITU Olympic Qualification List (as of May 15, 2016)	38	Brazil	Diogo Sclebin
ITU Olympic Qualification List (as of May 15, 2016)	38	Denmark	Andreas Schilling
ITU Olympic Qualification List (as of May 15, 2016)	38	Argentina	Luciano Taccone
ITU Olympic Qualification List (as of May 15, 2016)	38	Canada	Tyler Mislawchuk
Tripartite Commission Invitation	1	Jordan	Lawrence Fanous
ITU Points List (as of May 15, 2016)	3	Austria	Thomas Springer
ITU Points List (as of May 15, 2016)	3	Barbados	Jason Wilson
ITU Points List (as of May 15, 2016)	3	China	Bai Faquan
Re-allocation of unused quota places	7	Ireland	Bryan Keane
Re-allocation of unused quota places	7	Israel	Ron Darmon
Re-allocation of unused quota places	7	Mexico	Rodrigo González
Re-allocation of unused quota places	7	Portugal	Miguel Arraiolos
Re-allocation of unused quota places	7	Hungary	Tamás Tóth
Re-allocation of unused quota places	7	Puerto Rico	Manuel Huerta
Re-allocation of unused quota places	7	Ukraine	Ivan Ivanov
Total	55		

== Women's event ==
Event	Places	Qualified NOC	Selected triathlete
2015 European Games	1	Switzerland	Nicola Spirig
2016 African Championships	0*	~~South Africa~~^{[1]}	
2016 Asian Championships	1	Japan	Ai Ueda
2016 Oceania Championships	1	Australia	Emma Moffatt
2015 Pan American Games	1	Chile	Bárbara Riveros
ITU World Qualification Event	3	United States	Gwen Jorgensen
ITU World Qualification Event	3	Great Britain	Non Stanford
ITU World Qualification Event	3	Great Britain	Vicky Holland
ITU Olympic Qualification List (as of May 15, 2016)	36	New Zealand	Andrea Hewitt
ITU Olympic Qualification List (as of May 15, 2016)	36	United States	Sarah True
ITU Olympic Qualification List (as of May 15, 2016)	36	United States	Katie Zaferes
ITU Olympic Qualification List (as of May 15, 2016)	36	Netherlands	Rachel Klamer
ITU Olympic Qualification List (as of May 15, 2016)	36	Bermuda	Flora Duffy
ITU Olympic Qualification List (as of May 15, 2016)	36	Great Britain	Helen Jenkins
ITU Olympic Qualification List (as of May 15, 2016)	36	Australia	Ashleigh Gentle
ITU Olympic Qualification List (as of May 15, 2016)	36	Czech Republic	Vendula Frintová
ITU Olympic Qualification List (as of May 15, 2016)	36	Austria	Lisa Perterer
ITU Olympic Qualification List (as of May 15, 2016)	36	Ireland	Aileen Morrison
ITU Olympic Qualification List (as of May 15, 2016)	36	Italy	Annamaria Mazzetti
ITU Olympic Qualification List (as of May 15, 2016)	36	Germany	Anne Haug
ITU Olympic Qualification List (as of May 15, 2016)	36	Japan	Yuka Sato
ITU Olympic Qualification List (as of May 15, 2016)	36	Mexico	Claudia Rivas
ITU Olympic Qualification List (as of May 15, 2016)	36	Australia	Charlotte McShane
ITU Olympic Qualification List (as of May 15, 2016)	36	Brazil	Pâmella Oliveira
ITU Olympic Qualification List (as of May 15, 2016)	36	Japan	Yurie Kato
ITU Olympic Qualification List (as of May 15, 2016)	36	Austria	Sara Vilic
ITU Olympic Qualification List (as of May 15, 2016)	36	Spain	Ainhoa Murúa
ITU Olympic Qualification List (as of May 15, 2016)	36	South Africa	Gillian Sanders
ITU Olympic Qualification List (as of May 15, 2016)	36	New Zealand	Nicky Samuels
ITU Olympic Qualification List (as of May 15, 2016)	36	South Africa	Mari Rabie
ITU Olympic Qualification List (as of May 15, 2016)	36	Russia	Alexandra Razarenova
ITU Olympic Qualification List (as of May 15, 2016)	36	Ukraine	Yuliya Yelistratova
ITU Olympic Qualification List (as of May 15, 2016)	36	Switzerland	Jolanda Annen
ITU Olympic Qualification List (as of May 15, 2016)	36	Hungary	Margit Vanek
ITU Olympic Qualification List (as of May 15, 2016)	36	Poland	Agnieszka Jerzyk
ITU Olympic Qualification List (as of May 15, 2016)	36	France	Audrey Merle
ITU Olympic Qualification List (as of May 15, 2016)	36	Spain	Carolina Routier
ITU Olympic Qualification List (as of May 15, 2016)	36	Spain	Miriam Casillas
ITU Olympic Qualification List (as of May 15, 2016)	36	Canada	Kirsten Sweetland
ITU Olympic Qualification List (as of May 15, 2016)	36	Slovenia	Mateja Šimic
ITU Olympic Qualification List (as of May 15, 2016)	36	Italy	Charlotte Bonin
ITU Olympic Qualification List (as of May 15, 2016)	36	Russia	Anastasia Abrosimova
ITU Olympic Qualification List (as of May 15, 2016)	36	Canada	Sarah-Anne Brault
ITU Olympic Qualification List (as of May 15, 2016)	36	Hungary	Zsófia Kovács
ITU Points List (as of May 15, 2016)	4	Mauritius	Fabienne St. Louis
ITU Points List (as of May 15, 2016)	4	Ecuador	Elizabeth Bravo
ITU Points List (as of May 15, 2016)	4	China	Wang Lianyuan
ITU Points List (as of May 15, 2016)	4	Estonia	Kaidi Kivioja
Re-allocation of unused quota places	7	Belgium	Claire Michel
Re-allocation of unused quota places	7	Belgium	Katrien Verstuyft
Re-allocation of unused quota places	7	Sweden	Lisa Nordén
Re-allocation of unused quota places	7	Canada	Amelie Kretz
Re-allocation of unused quota places	7	Russia	Mariya Shorets
Re-allocation of unused quota places	7	Mexico	Cecilia Pérez
Re-allocation of unused quota places	7	France	Cassandre Beaugrand
Total	55		

== Notes ==
1. South Africa has awarded a quota place through the continental qualifier, but later declined, as SASCOC made an agreement on the Rio 2016 Olympics qualification criteria that the continental route would not be considered.
