= 2015 European Triathlon Championships =

2015 Europe Triathlon Championship
- Location: Geneva, Switzerland
- Date: 9-12 July 2015

The 2015 European Triathlon Championships was held in Geneva, Switzerland from 9 July to 12 July 2015.

== Medallists ==
Event	Gold		Silver		Bronze	
Elite
Men	David Hauss (FRA)	1:52:55	Sven Riederer (SUI)	1:53:13	Kristian Blummenfelt (NOR)	1:53:16
Women	Nicola Spirig (SUI)	2:07:15	Annamaria Mazzetti (ITA)	2:08:14	Ainhoa Murua Zubizarreta (ESP)	2:09:16
Mixed Relay	France; Jeanne Lehair; David Hauss; Emmie Charayron; Simon Viain	1:25:21	Switzerland; Jolanda Annen; Andrea Salvisberg; Nicola Spirig; Sven Riederer	1:25:30	United Kingdom; Jodie Stimpson; Lucy Hall; Thomas Bishop; Matthew Sharp	1:25:31
Junior
Men	Lasse Lührs (GER)	0:57:41	Ignacio Gonzalez Garcia (ESP)	0:57:42	Ben Dijkstra (GBR)	0:57:42
Women	Laura Lindemann (GER)	1:04:06	Jeanne Lehair (FRA)	1:04:42	Lena Meißner (GER)	1:04:50
Mixed Relay	France; Margot Garabedian; Maxime Hueber-Moosbrugger; Emilie Morier; Léo Bergere	1:28:37	Germany; Lena Meißner; Linus Stimmel; Lisa Tertsch; Lasse Lührs	1:28:59	Denmark; Alberte Kjær Pedersen; Daniel Bækkegård; Anne Holm; Emil Deleuran Hansen	1:29:14

== Results ==
=== Men's ===
Key

- # denotes the athlete's bib number for the event
- Swimming denotes the time it took the athlete to complete the swimming leg
- Cycling denotes the time it took the athlete to complete the cycling leg
- Running denotes the time it took the athlete to complete the running leg
- Difference denotes the time difference between the athlete and the event winner
- Lapped denotes that the athlete was lapped and removed from the course

0

Rank	#	Triathlete	Swimming	Cycling	Running	Total time	Difference
1st place, gold medalist(s)	16	David Hauss (FRA)	17:54	1:02:39	31:19	1:52:55	—
2nd place, silver medalist(s)	7	Sven Riederer (SUI)	17:55	1:02:38	31:42	1:53:13	+00:18
3rd place, bronze medalist(s)	24	Kristian Blummenfelt (NOR)	18:06	1:02:25	31:43	1:53:16	+00:21
4	9	Richard Varga (SVK)	17:41	1:02:38	31:46	1:53:20	+00:25
5	18	Thomas Bishop (GBR)	18:08	1:02:25	31:42	1:53:22	+00:27
6	1	Dmitry Polyanskiy (RUS)	17:41	1:02:52	32:09	1:53:46	+00:51
7	23	Francesc Godoy Contreras (ESP)	17:54	1:02:26	32:29	1:54:00	+01:05
8	3	Alessandro Fabian (ITA)	17:50	1:02:51	32:30	1:54:03	+01:08
9	5	Matthew Sharp (GBR)	28:08	1:02:38	00:00	1:54:07	+01:12
10	32	Tamás Tóth (HUN)	17:56	1:02:40	33:20	1:54:59	+02:04
11	41	Andreas Schilling (DEN)	18:10	0:00:00	33:30	1:55:08	+02:13
12	8	Pierre Le Corre (FRA)	17:55	1:02:36	33:39	1:55:09	+02:14
13	50	Delian Stateff (ITA)	17:49	1:02:24	33:55	1:55:27	+02:32
14	31	Jonas Schomburg (GER)	17:55	1:02:40	34:07	1:55:43	+02:48
15	15	Andrea Salvisberg (SUI)	17:53	1:02:42	34:15	1:55:49	+02:54
16	61	Ivan Vasiliev (RUS)	17:44	1:02:38	34:13	1:55:52	+02:57
17	21	Jelle Geens (BEL)	18:46	1:02:40	32:23	1:56:42	+03:47
18	2	Alexander Bryukhankov (RUS)	17:55	1:02:45	33:13	1:56:47	+03:52
19	36	Marco Van Der Stel (NED)	17:56	1:04:35	35:11	1:56:52	+03:57
20	19	Miguel Arraiolos (POR)	18:50	1:04:36	32:47	1:57:16	+04:21
21	14	Bryan Keane (IRL)	18:58	1:02:34	33:03	1:57:27	+04:32
22	26	Maximilian Schwetz (GER)	17:51	1:04:34	33:20	1:57:40	+04:45
23	35	Matthias Steinwandter (ITA)	17:59	1:04:23	36:16	1:57:53	+04:58
24	34	Simon De Cuyper (BEL)	19:01	1:05:13	33:40	1:58:05	+05:10
25	25	Yegor Martynenko (UKR)	18:47	1:02:40	33:44	1:58:12	+05:17
Source: Official results

=== Women's ===
Key

- # denotes the athlete's bib number for the event
- Swimming denotes the time it took the athlete to complete the swimming leg
- Cycling denotes the time it took the athlete to complete the cycling leg
- Running denotes the time it took the athlete to complete the running leg
- Difference denotes the time difference between the athlete and the event winner
- Lapped denotes that the athlete was lapped and removed from the course

0

Rank	#	Triathlete	Swimming	Cycling	Running	Total time	Difference
1st place, gold medalist(s)	1	Nicola Spirig (SUI)	19:48	1:10:49	35:33	2:07:15	—
2nd place, silver medalist(s)	2	Annamaria Mazzetti (ITA)	19:34	1:11:03	36:31	2:08:14	+00:59
3rd place, bronze medalist(s)	7	Ainhoa Murua Zubizarreta (ESP)	19:46	1:10:51	37:31	2:09:16	+02:01
4	5	Vendula Frintova (CZE)	19:50	1:11:03	35:44	2:09:45	+02:30
5	9	Lucy Hall (GBR)	18:48	1:10:51	38:14	2:09:59	+02:44
6	22	Agnieszka Jerzyk (POL)	20:39	1:13:07	36:13	2:10:20	+03:05
7	30	Lisa Norden (SWE)	19:42	1:11:48	38:40	2:10:26	+03:11
8	20	Emmie Charayron (FRA)	20:33	1:12:21	36:25	2:10:33	+03:18
9	6	Jodie Stimpson (GBR)	19:34	1:10:54	37:54	2:10:50	+03:35
10	11	Katrien Verstuyft (BEL)	20:23	1:12:27	36:52	2:10:56	+03:41
11	37	Jessica Learmonth (GBR)	18:50	1:12:18	39:11	2:11:00	+03:45
12	24	Julia Hauser (AUT)	20:32	1:12:36	00:00	2:11:11	+03:56
13	17	Arina Shulgina (KAZ)	20:28	1:11:45	37:04	2:11:14	+03:59
14	16	Jolanda Annen (SUI)	19:33	0:00:00	38:25	2:11:23	+04:08
15	8	Margit Vanek (HUN)	18:55	1:12:33	39:35	2:11:28	+04:13
16	25	Michelle Flipo (MEX)	19:56	1:12:17	37:49	2:11:57	+04:42
17	35	Emma Bilham (SUI)	20:27	1:11:42	38:20	2:12:24	+05:09
18	23	Miriam Casillas García (ESP)	20:34	1:12:58	00:00	2:12:38	+05:23
19	36	Sara Dossena (ITA)	20:44	1:12:30	35:40	2:12:49	+05:34
20	21	Maria Czesnik (POL)	20:30	0:00:00	38:51	2:13:02	+05:47
21	12	Zsófia Kovács (HUN)	19:44	1:15:07	40:01	2:13:04	+05:49
22	44	Valentina Zapatrina (RUS)	19:36	1:12:26	39:11	2:13:19	+06:04
23	39	India Lee (GBR)	19:52	1:12:09	39:15	2:13:24	+06:09
24	18	Mariya Shorets (RUS)	20:27	1:13:20	39:19	2:13:27	+06:12
25	15	Tamara Gomez Garrido (ESP)	19:53	1:13:06	40:13	2:14:24	+07:09
Source: Official results
