= Triathlon at the 2016 Summer Olympics – Men's =

Men's triathlon at the Games of the XXXI Olympiad
- Venue: Fort Copacabana, Rio de Janeiro
- Date: 18 August 2016
- Competitors: 55 from 31 nations
- Winning time: 1:45.01

Medalists
1st place, gold medalist(s)		Alistair Brownlee	Great Britain
2nd place, silver medalist(s)		Jonathan Brownlee	Great Britain
3rd place, bronze medalist(s)		Henri Schoeman	South Africa

The men's triathlon at the 2016 Summer Olympics took place at Fort Copacabana in Rio de Janeiro on 18 August.

A total of 55 men from 31 nations competed in the race.

Alistair Brownlee from Great Britain became the first man to defend his Olympic triathlon title after his previous win at the 2012 Summer Olympics. His younger brother Jonathan Brownlee finished in second place and added another Olympic medal to his collection after his bronze from 2012. Henri Schoeman took the bronze and became the first South African to win an Olympic triathlon medal, finishing just ahead of compatriot Richard Murray.

== Course ==
The event took place in Fort Copacabana. It consisted of a single 1.5 kilometres swim lap along the Copacabana beach. The competitors then completed a 38.48 kilometres bike leg consisting of eight 4.81 kilometres laps. The triathletes then ran four 2.5 kilometres laps to the finish line.

== Results ==
Key

- # denotes the athlete's bib number for the event
- Swimming denotes the time it took the athlete to complete the swimming leg
- Cycling denotes the time it took the athlete to complete the cycling leg
- Running denotes the time it took the athlete to complete the running leg
- Difference denotes the time difference between the athlete and the event winner
- Lapped denotes that the athlete was lapped and removed from the course
- * The total time includes both transitions

Rank	#	Triathlete	Swimming	Cycling	Running	Total time*	Difference
1st place, gold medalist(s)	5	Alistair Brownlee (GBR)	17:24	55:04	31:09	1:45:01	
2nd place, silver medalist(s)	6	Jonathan Brownlee (GBR)	17:24	55:04	31:16	1:45:07	+0:06
3rd place, bronze medalist(s)	2	Henri Schoeman (RSA)	17:25	55:01	31:50	1:45:43	+0:42
4	1	Richard Murray (RSA)	18:20	55:35	30:34	1:45:50	+0:49
5	11	João José Pereira (POR)	18:03	55:52	30:38	1:45:52	+0:51
6	15	Marten van Riel (BEL)	17:27	55:03	32:10	1:46:03	+1:02
7	18	Vincent Luis (FRA)	17:26	55:04	32:21	1:46:12	+1:11
8	56	Mario Mola (ESP)	17:37	56:18	31:12	1:46:26	+1:25
9	9	Aaron Royle (AUS)	17:26	55:05	32:47	1:46:42	+1:41
10	7	Ryan Bailie (AUS)	17:31	56:11	31:53	1:47:02	+2:01
11	49	Richard Varga (SVK)	17:18	55:10	33:26	1:47:17	+2:16
12	23	Crisanto Grajales (MEX)	17:59	55:52	32:13	1:47:28	+2:27
13	25	Kristian Blummenfelt (NOR)	17:39	56:12	32:17	1:47:31	+2:30
14	46	Alessandro Fabian (ITA)	17:22	55:07	33:37	1:47:35	+2:34
15	52	Tyler Mislawchuk (CAN)	17:31	56:23	32:33	1:47:50	+2:49
16	20	Andrea Salvisberg (SUI)	17:28	55:04	34:00	1:47:56	+2:55
17	36	Ryan Sissons (NZL)	17:34	56:20	32:45	1:48:01	+3:00
18	54	Fernando Alarza (ESP)	18:05	56:23	32:11	1:48:08	+3:07
19	19	Sven Riederer (SUI)	17:48	56:03	33:00	1:48:15	+3:14
20	26	Gabor Faldlum (HUN)	18:00	55:56	33:06	1:48:20	+3:19
21	35	Tony Dodds (NZL)	17:31	56:24	33:06	1:48:24	+3:23
22	24	Irving Perez (MEX)	17:35	56:21	33:10	1:48:26	+3:25
23	39	Joe Maloy (USA)	18:03	56:25	32:37	1:48:30	+3:29
24	8	Ryan Fisher (AUS)	18:01	55:42	33:25	1:48:34	+3:31
25	17	Pierre Le Corre (FRA)	17:28	57:02	32:43	1:48:36	+3:35
26	44	Ron Darmon (ISR)	18:06	55:48	33:21	1:48:41	+3:40
27	55	Vicente Hernandez (ESP)	18:10	55:41	33:34	1:48:50	+3:49
28	34	Andreas Schilling (DEN)	18:11	55:33	33:46	1:48:56	+3:55
29	38	Ben Kanute (USA)	17:29	55:03	35:01	1:48:59	+3:58
30	48	Leonardo Chacon (CRC)	18:11	55:43	33:46	1:49:06	+4:05
31	32	Igor Polyanskiy (RUS)	17:18	56:32	33:49	1:49:11	+4:10
32	31	Dmitry Polyanskiy (RUS)	17:24	57:07	33:30	1:49:26	+4:25
33	27	Tamás Tóth (HUN)	17:30	57:02	34:05	1:50:02	+5:01
34	47	Davide Uccellari (ITA)	17:32	56:57	35:09	1:51:06	+6:05
35	12	João Pedro Silva (POR)	18:08	56:22	35:35	1:51:33	+6:32
36	16	Dorian Conninx (FRA)	17:28	56:22	36:32	1:51:50	+6:49
37	37	Greg Billington (USA)	18:15	59:33	32:45	1:52:04	+7:03
38	14	Jelle Geens (BEL)	18:36	59:14	32:49	1:52:05	+7:04
39	51	Rostyslav Pevtsov (AZE)	18:14	59:32	32:47	1:52:06	+7:05
40	50	Bryan Keane (IRL)	18:10	59:30	32:51	1:52:09	+7:08
41	45	Diogo Sclebin (BRA)	18:20	59:29	33:14	1:52:32	+7:31
42	53	Andrew Yorke (CAN)	18:17	59:10	33:56	1:52:46	+7:45
43	33	Manuel Huerta (PUR)	18:19	59:30	34:08	1:53:22	+8:21
44	10	Miguel Arraiolos (POR)	18:44	59:04	34:22	1:53:35	+8:34
45	29	Gonzalo Raul Tellechea (ARG)	18:42	59:08	34:23	1:53:43	+8:42
46	21	Lawrence Fanous (JOR)	18:16	59:34	35:47	1:55:05	+10:04
47	3	Thomas Springer (AUT)	19:45	59:41	34:20	1:55:14	+10:13
48	28	Luciano Taccone (ARG)	19:23	59:56	34:35	1:55:30	+10:29
49	40	Ivan Ivanov (UKR)	18:58	1:00:26	35:02	1:56:00	+10:59
50	42	Bai Faquan (CHN)	17:31	59:49	39:22	1:58:08	+13:07
	30	Alexander Bryukhankov (RUS)	17:26	Did not finish			
	4	Gordon Benson (GBR)	18:09	Did not finish			
	43	Jason Wilson (BAR)	17:31	Did not finish			
	22	Rodrigo González (MEX)	18:38	Lapped			
	41	Hirokatsu Tayama (JPN)	17:34	Lapped			
Source: Official results
