= Switzerland at the 2018 European Championships =

- IOC code: SUI

in (United Kingdom) Glasgow (Germany) Berlin 2 August 2018 – 12 August 2018
- Competitors: 154 in 6 sports
- Medals Ranked 28th: Gold 8 Silver 4 Bronze 7 Total 19

European Championships appearances
- 2018; 2022

Switzerland competed at the inaugural 7 sports 2018 European Championships from 2 to 12 August 2018. It competed in 6 sports.

== Medallists ==
Medal	Name	Sport	Event	Date
Gold	Michael Schmid	Rowing	Men's lightweight single sculls	5 August
Gold	Jeannine Gmelin	Rowing	Women's single sculls	5 August
Gold	Jérémy Desplanches	Swimming	Men's 200 metre individual medley	6 August
Gold	Jolanda Neff	Cycling	Women's cross-country	7 August
Gold	Lars Forster	Cycling	Men's cross-country	7 August
Gold	Nicola Spirig	Triathlon	Women's	9 August
Gold	Léa Sprunger	Athletics	Women's 400 metres hurdles	10 August
Gold	Oliver Hegi	Gymnastics	Men's horizontal bar	12 August
Silver	Stefan Bissegger; Claudio Imhof; Frank Pasche; Théry Schir; Cyrille Thièry	Cycling	Men's team pursuit	3 August
Silver	Lisa Berger; Sylvain Fridelance; Andrea Salvisberg; Nicola Spirig	Triathlon	Mixed team relay	11 August
Silver	Tadesse Abraham	Athletics	Men's marathon	12 August
Silver	Fabienne Schlumpf	Athletics	Women's 3000 metres steeplechase	12 August
Bronze	Tristan Marguet	Cycling	Men's scratch	3 August
Bronze	Patricia Merz; Frédérique Rol	Rowing	Women's lightweight double sculls	5 August
Bronze	Roman Röösli	Rowing	Men's single sculls	5 August
Bronze	Claudio Imhof	Cycling	Men's individual pursuit	5 August
Bronze	Maria Ugolkova	Swimming	Women's 200 metre individual medley	6 August
Bronze	Alex Wilson	Athletics	Men's 200 metres	9 August
Bronze	Oliver Hegi	Gymnastics	Men's parallel bars	12 August
