= ECS Triathlon =

French sports club

Espérance cycliste Sartrouville Triathlon
- Full name: Espérance cycliste Sartrouville Triathlon
- Founded: 1993
- Location: Sartrouville, France
- Chairman: Denis Veron
- Colours: green
- Website: www.sartrouville-triathlon.com

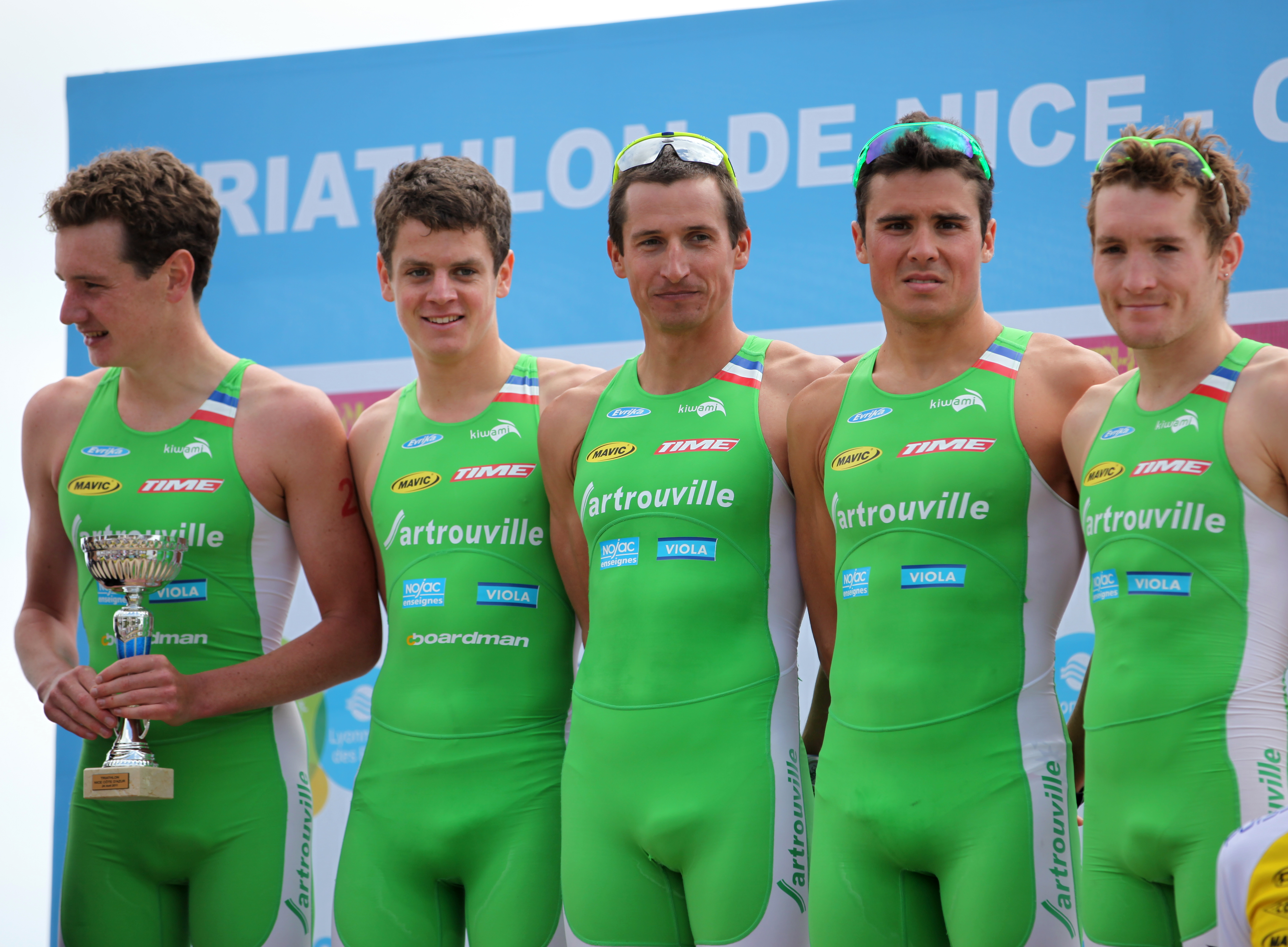
Sartrouville's stars Alistair (left) and Jonathan (right) Brownlee and Javier Gómez Noya with Diemunsch and Ospaly in Nice, 2011.

Espérance cycliste Sartrouville Triathlon or ECS Triathlon is a French sports club based in the suburbs of Paris, commune of Sartrouville. The club's specialization is triathlon for elite level athletes, especially Olympians. Team members have won a total of eight Olympic medals, including the gold medals in male and female triathlon at the 2016 Summer Olympics, and gold, silver, and bronze medals in male triathlon at the 2012 Summer Olympics.

== History ==
Espérance cycliste Sartrouville Triathlon was founded in 1993 by Pierre Veron as a section of the cycling club Espérance cycliste Sartrouville. Veron led the team until his death in 2009, after which leadership passed to his son, Denis Veron.

A female team was created in 2000. In 2016, 18 team members participated in Triathlon at the 2016 Summer Olympics.

== Green team ==
The elite level team is known as The Green Team, because of their green colored uniforms.

2016 green team
| Males | Nationality | Females | Nationality |
|---|---|---|---|
| Alistair Brownlee | Great Britain | Gwen Jorgensen | United States |
| Jonathan Brownlee | Great Britain | Kirsten Sweetland | Canada |
| Javier Gómez | Spain | Anneke Jenkins | New Zealand |
| Mario Mola | Spain | Lucy Hall | Great Britain |
| Fernando Alarza | Spain | Maaike Caelers | Netherlands |
| Kristian Blummenfelt | Norway | Emmie Charayron | France |
| Filip Ospalý | Czech Republic | Non Stanford | Great Britain |
| Crisanto Grajales | Mexico | Laura Lindermann | Germany |
| Vicente Hernandez | Spain | Jolanda Annen | Switzerland |
| Andrea Salvisberg | Switzerland | Lisa Norden | Sweden |
| Gabor Faldum | Hungary | | |

Former members :

- David Hauss France
- Alessia Orla Italy
- Richard Murray South Africa , participating to Rio 2016 olympics
