= Switzerland at the 2022 European Championships =

in (Germany) Munich 11 August 2022 – 22 August 2022
- Competitors: 153 in 12 sports
- Medals Ranked 15th: Gold 3 Silver 5 Bronze 6 Total 14

European Championships appearances
- 2018; 2022

Switzerland will compete at the 2022 European Championships in Munich from 11 to 22 August 2022.

== Medallists ==
Medal	Name	Sport	Event	Date
Gold	Marlen Reusser	Cycling	Women's individual time trial	17 August
Gold	Stefan Bissegger	Cycling	Men's individual time trial	17 August
Gold	Mujinga Kambundji	Athletics	Women's 200 metres	19 August
Silver	Simon Ehammer	Athletics	Men's decathlon	16 August
Silver	Mujinga Kambundji	Athletics	Women's 100 metres	16 August
Silver	Stefan Küng	Cycling	Men's individual time trial	17 August
Silver	Ricky Petrucciani	Athletics	Men's 400 metres	17 August
Silver	Tanja Hüberli; Nina Brunner	Beach volleyball	Women's tournament	20 August
Bronze	Andri Struzina	Rowing	Men's lightweight single sculls	14 August
Bronze	Jan Schäuble; Raphaël Ahumada	Rowing	Men's lightweight double sculls	14 August
Bronze	Max Studer; Cathia Schär; Simon Westermann; Julie Derron	Triathlon	Mixed relay	14 August
Bronze	Annik Kälin	Athletics	Women's heptathlon	18 August
Bronze	Filippo Colombo	Cycling	Men's cross-country	19 August
Bronze	Ditaji Kambundji	Athletics	Women's 100 metres hurdles	21 August

== Competitors ==
The following is the list of number of competitors in the Championships:

Sport	Men	Women	Total
Artistic gymnastics (men and women)	5	5	10
Athletics	25	23	48
Beach volleyball	4	6	10
Canoe sprint	0	1	1
Cycling BMX	1	1	2
Cycling mountain bike	8	8	16
Cycling road	8	5	13
Cycling track	5	6	11
Rowing	14	10	24
Sport climbing	5	4	9
Table tennis	2	1	3
Triathlon	3	3	6
Total	80	73	153

== Athletics ==
Switzerland entered the following athletes.

Key

- Q = Qualified for the next round
- q = Qualified for the next round as a fastest loser or, in field events, by position without achieving the qualifying target
- NR = National record
- PB = Personal best
- SB = Season best
- N/A = Round not applicable for the event

=== Men ===
Track and road events

Athlete	Event	Heat		Semifinal		Final	
Athlete	Event	Result	Rank	Result	Rank	Result	Rank
Pascal Mancini	100 metres	10.24	3 Q	10.23	14	did not advance	
William Reais	200 metres	20.66 SB	5 Q	20.82	18	did not advance	
Felix Svensson	200 metres	20.90	=15	did not advance			
Ricky Petrucciani	400 metres	45.26 SB	2 Q	45.55	6 Q	45.03 SB	2nd place, silver medalist(s)
Lionel Spitz	400 metres	45.46 PB	4 Q	45.56	7 q	45.66	7
Jonas Raess	5000 metres	—				13:36.18	15
Adrian Lehmann	Marathon	—				2:15:57 SB	23
Julien Lyon	Marathon	—				did not finish	
Patrik Wägeli	Marathon	—				2:18:46 SB	37
Finley Gaio	110 metres hurdles	13.46 PB	1 Q	13.50	8 q	13.50	5
Mathieu Jaquet	110 metres hurdles	13.91	18	did not advance			
Jason Joseph	110 metres hurdles	Bye		13.45	5 Q	13.35	4
Julien Bonvin	400 metres hurdles	49.41	3 Q	49.10 PB	6 q	50.24	7
Dany Brand	400 metres hurdles	50.30	13	did not advance			
Nahom Yirga	400 metres hurdles	51.55	22	did not advance			
Michael Curti	3000 metres steeplechase	8:56.46	26	—		did not advance	
Pascal Mancini; Bradley Lestrade; Felix Svensson; William Reais; Daniel Löhrer^{[a]}	4 × 100 metres relay	39.03 SB	9 Q	—		38.36 NR	5
Lionel Spitz; Charles Devantay; Filippo Moggi; Ricky Petrucciani	4 × 400 metres relay	did not finish		—		did not advance	

Field events

Athlete	Event	Qualification		Final	
Athlete	Event	Distance	Position	Distance	Position
Dominik Alberto	Pole vault	5.65 SB	11 q	NM	
Benjamin Gföhler	Long jump	7.49	17	did not advance	

Combined events – Decathlon

Athlete	Event	100 m	LJ	SP	HJ	400 m	110H	DT	PV	JT	1500 m	Final	Rank
Simon Ehammer	Result	10.56	8.31 CB	14.24	2.08 PB	47.40 SB	13.75	34.92	5.20 PB	53.46	4:48.72 SB	8468 NR	2nd place, silver medalist(s)
Simon Ehammer	Points	961	1141	743	878	938	1007	562	972	640	626	8468 NR	2nd place, silver medalist(s)

=== Women ===
Track and road events

Athlete	Event	Heat		Semifinal		Final	
Athlete	Event	Result	Rank	Result	Rank	Result	Rank
Géraldine Frey	100 metres	11.45	8 Q	11.38	10	did not advance	
Nathacha Kouni	100 metres	Bye		11.54	20	did not advance	
Mujinga Kambundji	100 metres	Bye		11.05	2 Q	10.99	2nd place, silver medalist(s)
Mujinga Kambundji	200 metres	Bye		22.76	3 Q	22.32	1st place, gold medalist(s)
Léonie Pointet	200 metres	23.39	14 q	23.77	22	did not advance	
Silke Lemmens	400 metres	52.27	10 Q	53.08	22	did not advance	
Lore Hoffmann	800 metres	2:01.16	2 Q	2:01.12	7 q	1:59.92	4
Audrey Werro	800 metres	2:06.34	28	did not advance			
Fabienne Schlumpf	Marathon	—				2:30:17 SB	9
Ditaji Kambundji	100 metres hurdles	Bye		12.78	5 Q	12.74	3rd place, bronze medalist(s)
Noemi Zbären	100 metres hurdles	13.34	10 q	13.15	14	did not advance	
Annina Fahr	400 metres hurdles	56.16 PB	3 Q	57.07	18	did not advance	
Yasmin Giger	400 metres hurdles	56.69	8 Q	57.13	20	did not advance	
Chiara Scherrer	3000 metres steeplechase	9:41.85	9 Q	—		9:43.95	13
Géraldine Frey; Ajla Del Ponte; Salomé Kora; Melissa Gutschmidt	4 × 100 metres relay	43.93	9	—		did not advance	
Silke Lemmens; Julia Niederberger; Annina Fahr; Sarah King	4 × 400 metres relay	3:26.83 SB	6 Q	—		3:26.94	7

Field events

Athlete	Event	Qualification		Final	
Athlete	Event	Distance	Position	Distance	Position
Angelica Moser	Pole vault	4.50	=4 q	4.55	=4
Pascale Stöcklin	Pole vault	4.25	21	did not advance	

Combined events – Heptathlon

Athlete	Event	100H	HJ	SP	200 m	LJ	JT	800 m	Final	Rank
Annik Kälin	Result	13.23	1.74	13.56	24.14	6.73 PB	46.72	2:13.73 PB	6515 NR	3rd place, bronze medalist(s)
Annik Kälin	Points	1090	903	765	967	1082	797	911	6515 NR	3rd place, bronze medalist(s)

^{a} Athletes who participated in the heats only.

== Beach Volleyball ==
Switzerland has qualified 2 male and 4 female pairs.

Athlete	Event	Preliminary round			Round of 24	Round of 16	Quarterfinals	Semifinals	Final / BM	
Athlete	Event	Opposition Score	Opposition Score	Rank	Opposition Score	Opposition Score	Opposition Score	Opposition Score	Opposition Score	Rank
Marco Krattiger; Florian Breer	Men's	Lupo – Ranghieri (ITA)								
Quentin Métral; Yves Haussener	Men's	Seidl – Waller (AUT)								
Menia Bentele; Anna Lutz	Women's	Stam – Schoon (NED)								
Esmée Böbner; Zoé Vergé-Dépré	Women's	Davidova – Lunina (UKR)								
Nina Brunner; Tanja Hüberli	Women's	Walkenhorst – Lippmann (GER)								
Menia Bentele; Anouk Vergé-Dépré	Women's	Makhno – Makhno (UKR)								

== Cycling ==
=== Road ===
Men

Athlete	Event	Time	Rank
Stefan Bissegger	Road race	4:39:35	78
Stefan Bissegger	Time trial	27:05.96	1st place, gold medalist(s)
Tom Bohli	Road race	4:38:49	17
Silvan Dillier	Road race	4:39:35	73
Stefan Küng	Time trial	27:06.49	2nd place, silver medalist(s)
Lukas Rüegg	Road race	4:39:07	53
Michael Schär	Road race	4:39:07	52
Reto Hollenstein	Road race	4:39:07	51
Simon Pellaud	Road race	4:38:54	25

Women

Athlete	Event	Time	Rank
Caroline Baur	Road race	2:59:20	20
Lea Fuchs	Road race	2:59:40	46
Elena Hartmann	Time trial	32:37.85	9
Marlen Reusser	Road race	2:59:20	17
Marlen Reusser	Time trial	30:59.90	1st place, gold medalist(s)
Michelle Stark	Road race	DNF	

=== Mountain bike ===
Men

Athlete	Event	Time	Rank
Vital Albin	Cross-country	1:18:55	9
Filippo Colombo	Cross-country	1:18:21	3rd place, bronze medalist(s)
Mathias Flückiger	Cross-country	DNS	
Lars Forster	Cross-country	1:18:39	7
Andri Frischknecht	Cross-country	1:18:46	8
Marcel Guerrini	Cross-country	1:20:47	25
Thomas Litscher	Cross-country	1:18:30	5
Joel Roth	Cross-country	1:19:00	11

Women

Athlete	Event	Time	Rank
Ramona Forchini	Cross-country	1:38:46	30
Sina Frei	Cross-country	1:33:22	7
Steffi Häberlin	Cross-country	1:34:50	15
Linda Indergand	Cross-country	1:33:44	9
Alessandra Keller	Cross-country	1:33:11	6
Nicole Koller	Cross-country	1:36:53	19
Seraina Leugger	Cross-country	-4 lap	43
Jolanda Neff	Cross-country	1:31:37	4

== Gymnastics ==
Switzerland has entered 5 men and 5 women.

=== Men ===
Qualification

Athlete	Event	Qualification								Final							
Athlete	Event	Apparatus						Total	Rank	Apparatus						Total	Rank
Athlete	Event	F	PH	R	V	PB	HB	Total	Rank	F	PH	R	V	PB	HB	Total	Rank
Andrin Frey	Team															—	
Moreno Kratter	Team															—	
Marco Pfyl	Team															—	
Noe Seifert	Team															—	
Dominic Tamsel	Team															—	
Total	Team																

=== Women ===
Qualification

Athlete	Event	Qualification						Final					
Athlete	Event	Apparatus				Total	Rank	Apparatus				Total	Rank
Athlete	Event	V	UB	BB	F	Total	Rank	V	UB	BB	F	Total	Rank
Lena Bickel	Team											—	
Chiara Giubellini	Team											—	
Lilli Habisreutinger	Team											—	
Stefanie Siegenthaler	Team											—	
Anina Wildi	Team											—	
Total	Team												

== Triathlon ==
Athlete	Event	Swim (1.5 km)	Trans 1	Bike (40 km)	Trans 2	Run (10 km)	Total Time	Rank
Sylvain Fridelance	Men's							
Max Studer	Men's							
Simon Westermann	Men's							
Julie Derron	Women's							
Nora Gmür	Women's							
Cathia Schär	Women's							

Relay

Athlete	Event	Swim (300 m)	Trans 1	Bike (6.8 km)	Trans 2	Run (2 km)	Total Group Time	Rank
	Mixed relay							
