= Alessia Orla =

Italian triathlete (born 1992)

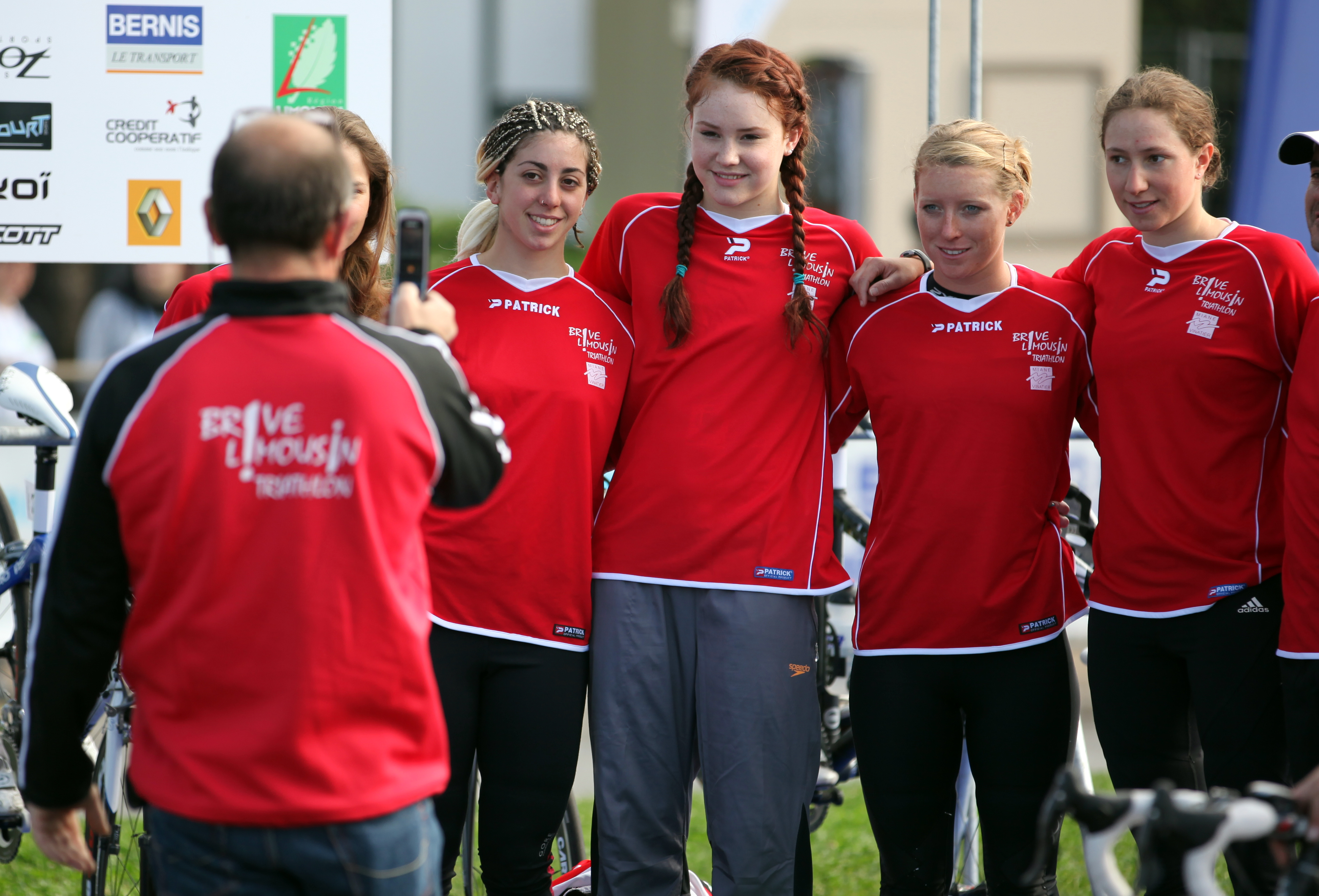
Alessia Orla (fourth from right) at the Grand Prix triathlon in Nice, 2011.

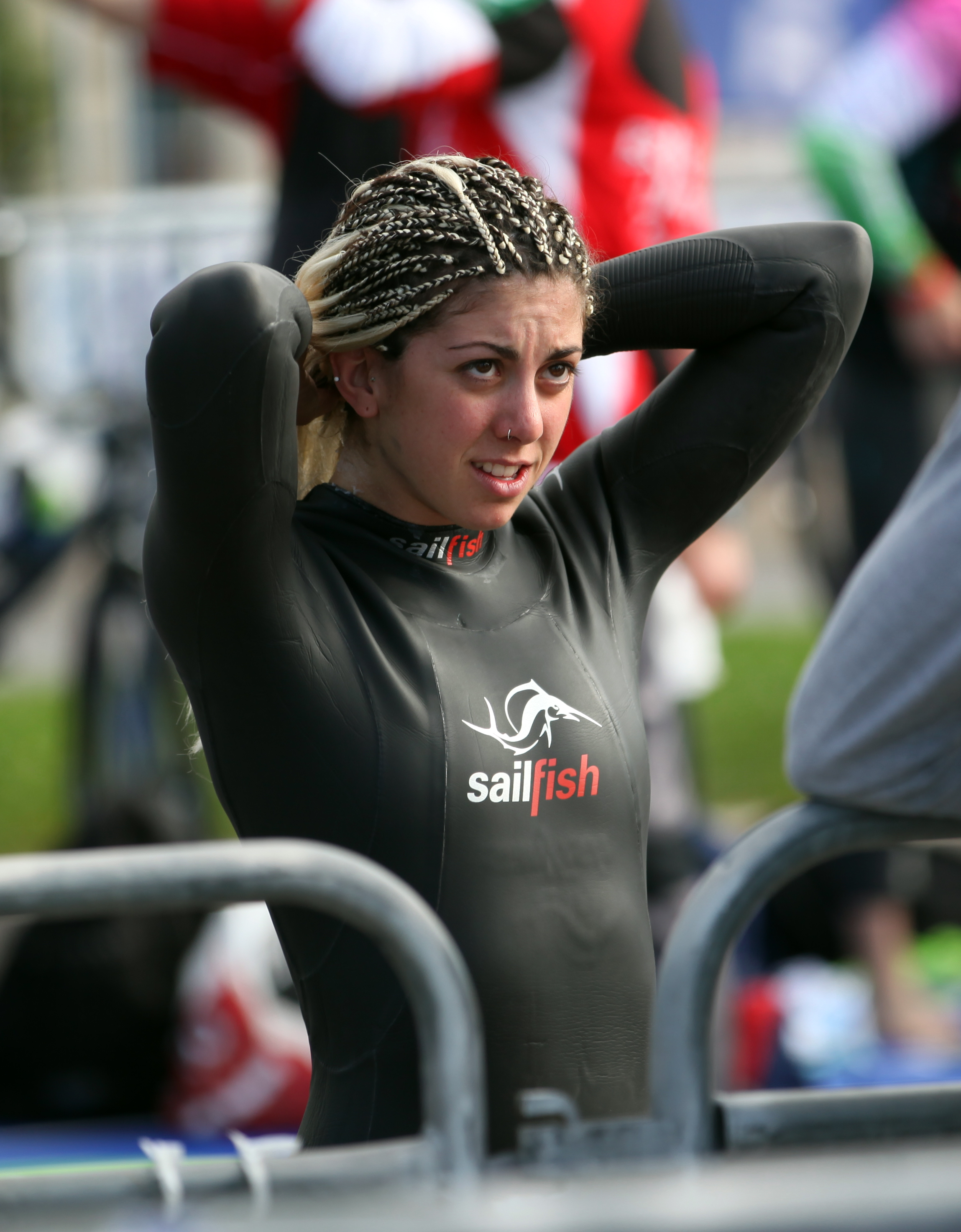
Alessia Orla preparing for the Grand Prix triathlon in Nice, 2011.

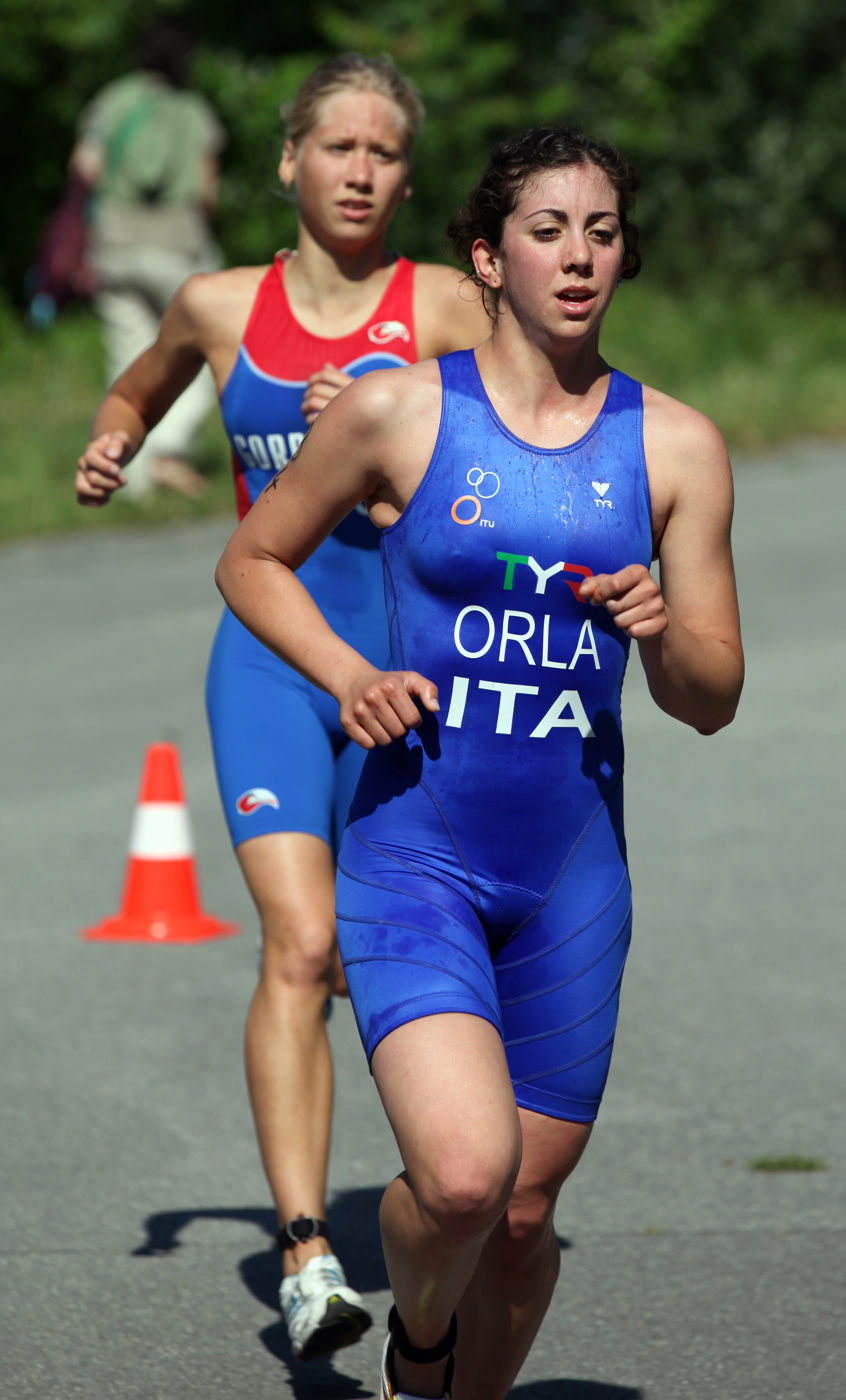
Alessia Orla, followed by the Russian Anastasia Gorbunova, at the European Cup triathlon in Vienna, 2011.

Alessia Orla (born 5 April 1992 in Venaria Reale, Provincia di Torino) is an Italian professional triathlete, national youth champion of the year 2006 and junior champion of the year 2009.

In Italy, Alessia Orla represents the clubs AS Torino Triathlon and RUN Torino.

In 2011, Orla also takes part in the prestigious French Club Championship Series Lyonnaise des Eaux representing Brive Limousin. At the opening triathlon in Nice (24 April 2011), Orla placed 23rd and proved to be among the three triathlètes classants l'équipe, none of whom was French (Lucy Hall, Emma Davis, Alessia Orla). At the Triathlon de Dunkerque (22 May 2011), Orla placed 24th and was the best of her club.

Brive Limousin does not mention Alessia Orla among its D1 elite triathletes. Triathlon Club Nantais, however, does enumerate her among its elite triathletes together with two Italian guest stars, Charlotte Bonin and Annamaria Mazzetti.

She is part of ECS Triathlon club.

== ITU Competitions ==
In 2009, Alessia Orla won the silver medal at the European Junior Team Championships in Tarzo Revine, in 2011 she won the gold medal at the Junior European Cup triathlon in Zwevegem. Since 2011 Orla has attended elite ITU triathlons, placing 6th at the Winter Triathlon Cup in Valsesia.

The following list is based upon the official ITU rankings and the ITU Athletes's Profile Page. Unless indicated otherwise, the following events are triathlons (Olympic Distance) and refer to the Elite category.

Date	Competition	Place	Rank
2009-07-02	European Championships (Junior)	Tarzo Revine	33
2009-07-02	European Championships (Team/Junior)	Tarzo Revine	2
2009-09-26	European Youth Olympic Games Qualifier	Mar Menor	20
2010-07-03	European Championships (Junior)	Athlone	DNF
2010-08-14	Youth Olympic Games	Singapore	19
2011-01-23	Winter Triathlon European Cup	Valsesia	6
2011-05-29	Junior European Cup	Zwevegem	1
2011-06-11	Junior European Cup	Vienna	12
2011-07-03	Junior European Cup	Düsseldorf	12
