= 2018 European Triathlon Championships =

Event in Glasgow part of the European Champions

- Host city: Glasgow
- Country: United Kingdom
- Athletes: 125
- Events: 3
- Dates: 9–11 August 2018
- Website: glasgow2018.com

The 2018 European Triathlon Championships were held in Glasgow, United Kingdom, from 9 to 11 August 2018. The championships were part of the first European Championships with six other sports events taking place in Glasgow and Berlin.

== Events ==
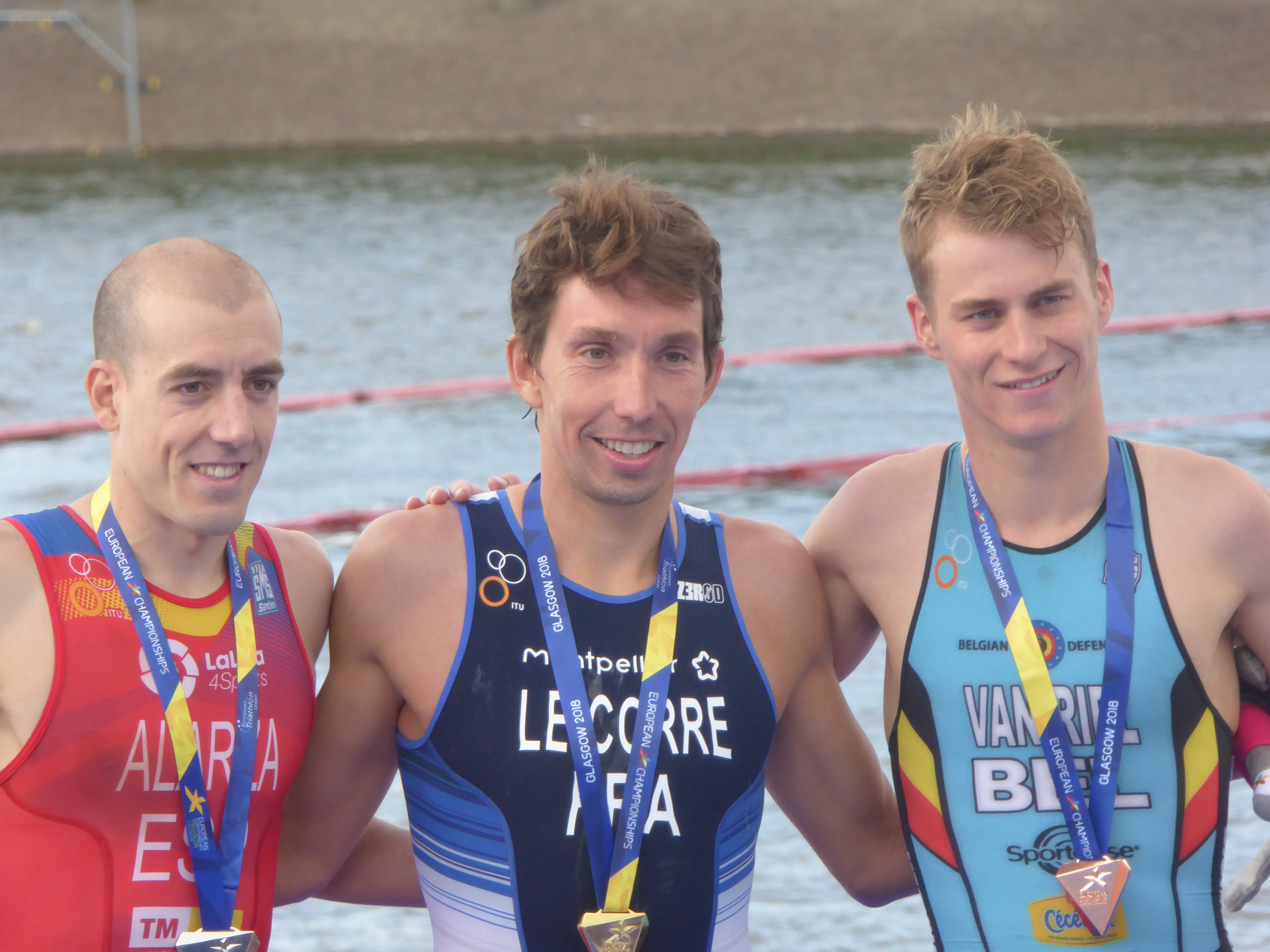
The medallists for the men's event (from left to right): Fernando Alarza (silver), Pierre Le Corre (gold) and Marten Van Riel (bronze)

Event	Gold		Silver		Bronze	
Men's	Pierre Le Corre; France	1:47.17	Fernando Alarza; Spain	1:47.28	Marten Van Riel; Belgium	1:47.40
Women's	Nicola Spirig; Switzerland	1:59.13	Jess Learmonth; Great Britain	1:59.46	Cassandre Beaugrand; France	2:01.01
Mixed team relay	France Léonie Périault; Pierre Le Corre; Cassandre Beaugrand; Dorian Coninx	1:15.07	Switzerland Lisa Berger; Andrea Salvisberg; Nicola Spirig; Sylvain Fridelance	1:15.18	Belgium Claire Michel; Jelle Geens; Valerie Barthelemy; Marten Van Riel	1:15.29

== Medal table ==
* Host nation (Great Britain)

Rank	Nation	Gold	Silver	Bronze	Total
1	France (FRA)	2	0	1	3
2	Switzerland (SUI)	1	1	0	2
3	Great Britain (GBR)*	0	1	0	1
3	Spain (ESP)	0	1	0	1
5	Belgium (BEL)	0	0	2	2
Totals (5 entries)		3	3	3	9
