= Valérie Barthelemy =

Belgian triathlete (born 1991)

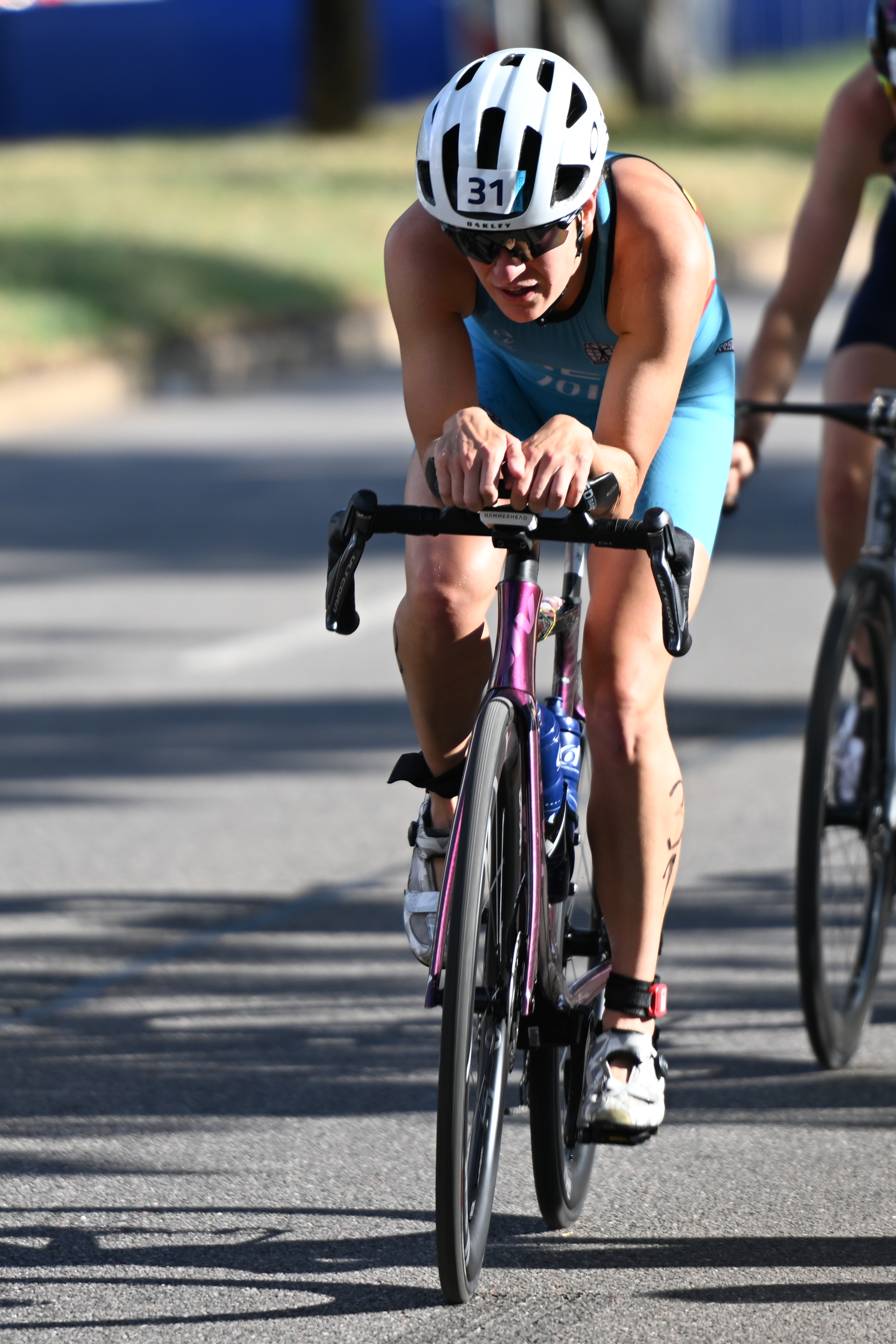

Personal information
- Nationality: Belgian
- Born: 30 April 1991 (age 35)
- Education: University of Michigan

Sport
- Sport: Triathlon
Medal record
Women's triathlon
Representing Belgium
European Championships
Bronze medal – third place	2018 Glasgow	Mixed team relay
Super League Triathlon
Bronze medal – third place	Arena Games, Rotterdam	2020

Valérie Barthelemy (born 30 April 1991) is a Belgian triathlete. She represented Belgium at the 2020 Summer Olympics in Tokyo 2021, competing in triathlon.

Barthelemy also competes in Super League Triathlon. She finished 3rd in the Arena Games, Rotterdam 2020.

Her achievements include a bronze medal in Mixed team relay at the 2018 European Triathlon Championships.

Barthelemy swam collegiately for the University of Michigan.
