= Thomas Springer =

Austrian triathlete

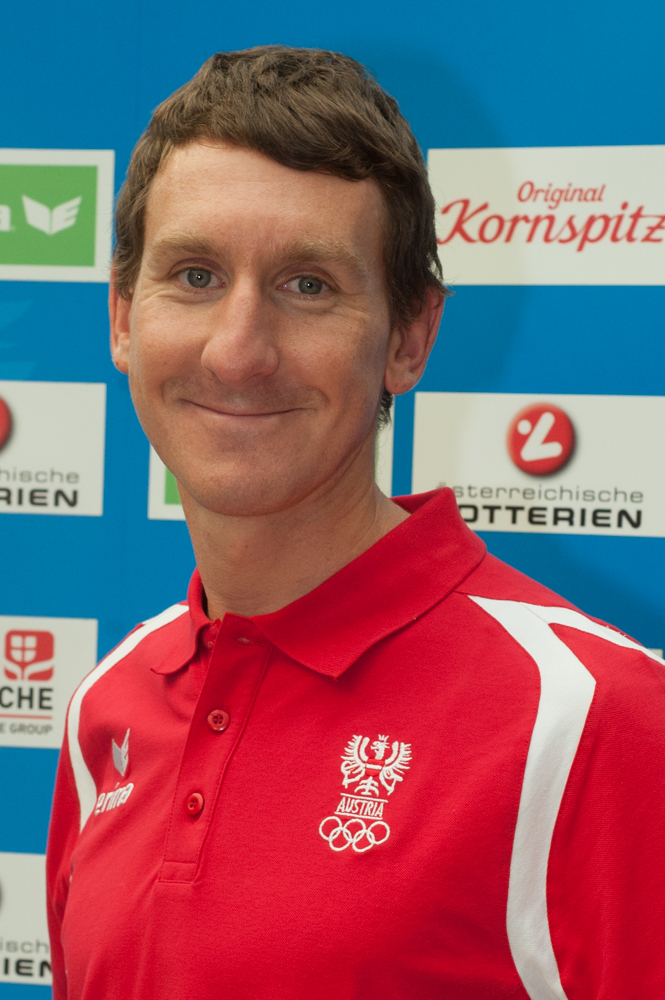
- Springer in 2016

Personal information
- Born: 6 November 1984 (age 40)

Sport
- Sport: Triathlon

Thomas Springer (born 6 November 1984) is an Austrian triathlete. He competed in the men's event at the 2016 Summer Olympics.
