= Jason Wilson (triathlete) =

Barbadian triathlete (born 1990)

Personal information
- Born: 31 October 1990 (age 35) Bridgetown, Barbados

Sport
- Sport: Triathlon

Jason Wilson (born 31 October 1990) is a Barbadian triathlete. He competed in the men's event at the 2016 Summer Olympics.
