= Lawrence Fanous =

Jordanian triathlete (born 1985)

Personal information
- Born: 27 August 1985 (age 39); Amman, Jordan
- Height: 170 cm (5 ft 7 in)
- Weight: 61 kg (134 lb)

Sport
- Country: Jordan
- Sport: Triathlon

Lawrence Fanous (Arabic: لورانس فانوس. born 27 August 1985) is a Jordanian triathlete. He competed in the men's event at the 2016 Summer Olympics.
