= Vicente Hernández =

Spanish triathlete

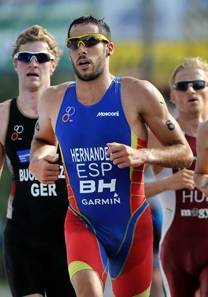
- Vicente Hernández in 2012

Personal information
- Full name: Vicente Hernández Cabrera
- Born: 20 April 1991 (age 35)

Sport
- Sport: Triathlon

Vicente Hernández Cabrera (born 20 April 1991) is a Spanish triathlete. He competed in the men's event at the 2016 Summer Olympics. He is part of ECS Triathlon club.
