= Sarah King =

Sarah King may refer to:

- Sarah Millican (born 1975), née King, English comedian
- Sarah McKelley King (1921–2013), American civic leader, president general of the Daughters of the American Revolution

== See also ==
- Sara King (born 1982), Alaskan fantasy writer
