= Tamara Gómez Garrido =

Spanish triathlete

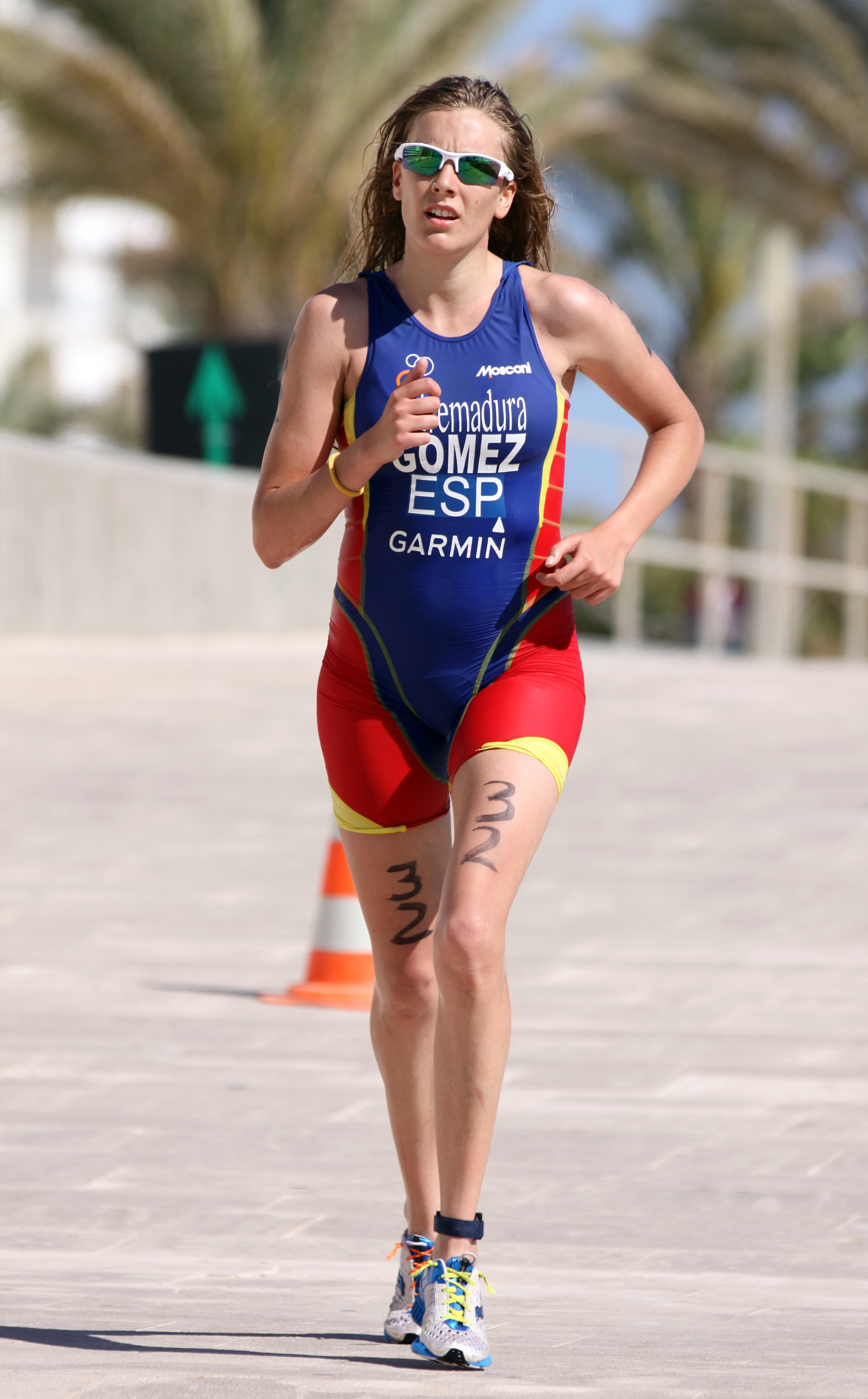
Tamara Gómez Garrido (2011)

Tamara Gómez Garrido (born 1991 in Elche) is a Spanish professional triathlete and member of the National High Performance Team (Deportistas de Alto Nivel).

In 2010, Tamara Gómez had her definite breakthrough. She won the National Junior Championships, placed third at the Spanish University Championships, and she won the silver medal at the Spanish Duathlon Championships (Junior).

In the same year she also started her international career and took part at three European elite cups and at two junior championships. At the European Junior Duathlon Championships she won the gold medal in the team competition.

Like Carolina Routier, Tamara Gómez Garrido lives in the Spanish Triathlon High Performance Centre Residencia Joaquín Blume in Madrid and studies veterinary medicine at the Universidad Complutense de Madrid.

In Spain, Tamara Gómez Garrido represented Atletisme Crevillent and CERR Strands Triathlon. She is a member of the Federación de Triatlón de la Comunitat Valenciana.

== ITU Competitions ==
In the year 2010 when Gómez Garrido had her ITU debut, she took part in 6 ITU competitions. The following list is based upon the official ITU rankings and the ITU Athletes's Profile Page. Unless indicated otherwise, the following events are Olympic Distance Triathlons and refer to the Elite category.

Date	Competition	Place	Rank
2010-04-30	Duathlon European Championships (Junior)	Nancy	14
2010-04-30	Duathlon European Championships (Junior/Team)	Nancy	1
2010-06-12	Premium European Cup	Pontevedra	26
2010-07-03	European Championships (Junior)	Athlone	30
2010-08-15	European Cup	Geneva	DNF
2010-08-22	European Cup	Karlovy Vary (Carlsbad)	15
2011-04-09	European Cup	Quarteira	23
2011-04-30	Cross Triathlon World Championships (U23)	Extremadura	5
2011-05-29	Premium European Cup	Brasschaat	26
