= Fernando Alarza =

Spanish triathlete (born 1991)

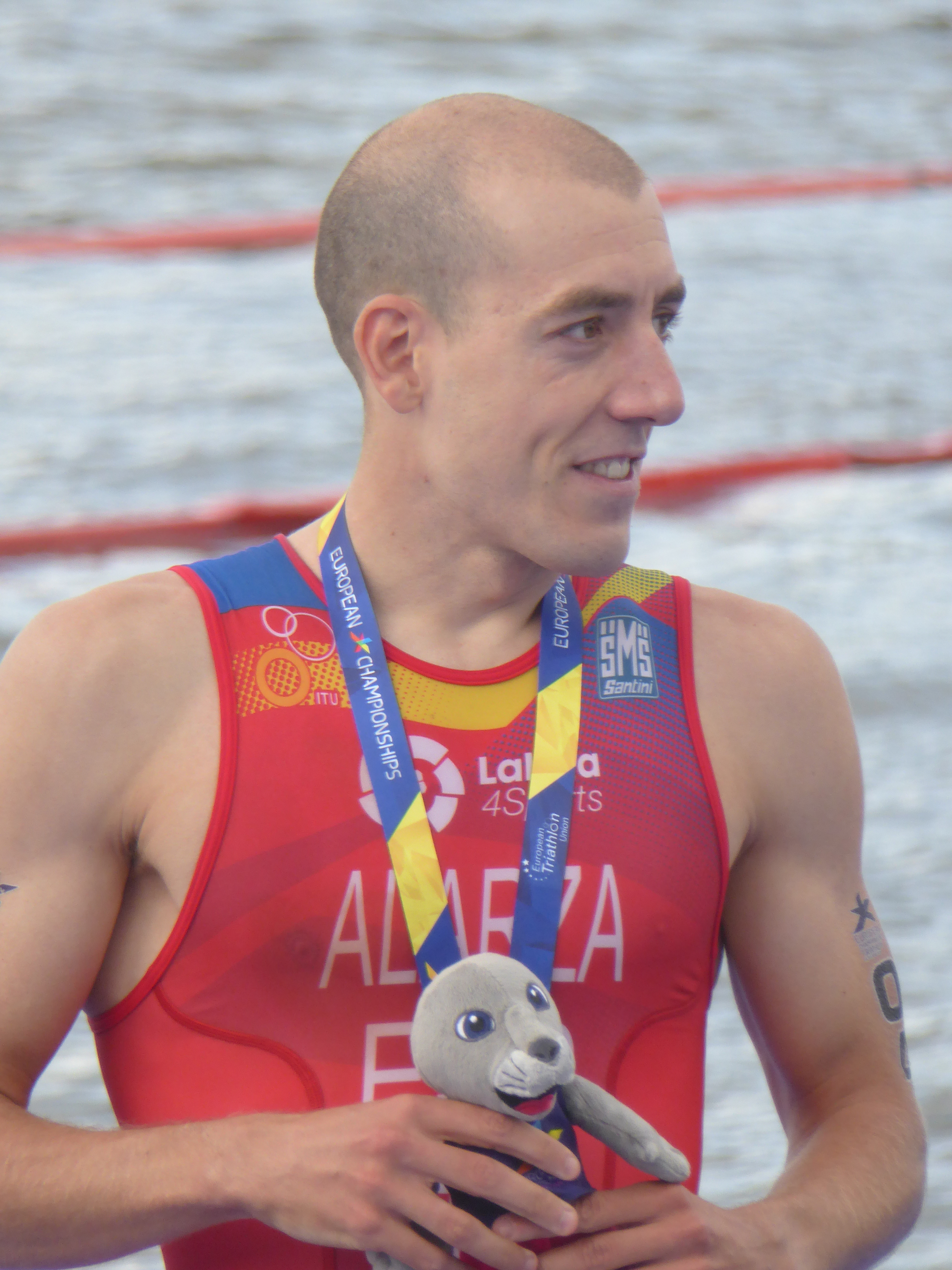
- Alarza at the 2018 European Triathlon Championships

Personal information
- Full name: Fernando Alarza Vicente
- Born: 23 March 1991 (age 35) Talavera de la Reina, Spain

Sport
- Country: Spain
- Sport: Triathlon
Medal record
Men's triathlon
Representing Spain
European Championships
Silver medal – second place	2018 Glasgow	Individual

Fernando Alarza Vicente (born 23 March 1991) is a Spanish triathlete. He competed in the men's event at the 2016 Summer Olympics. In 2015 he was part of ECS Triathlon team.
