= Diogo Sclebin =

Brazilian triathlete (born 1982)

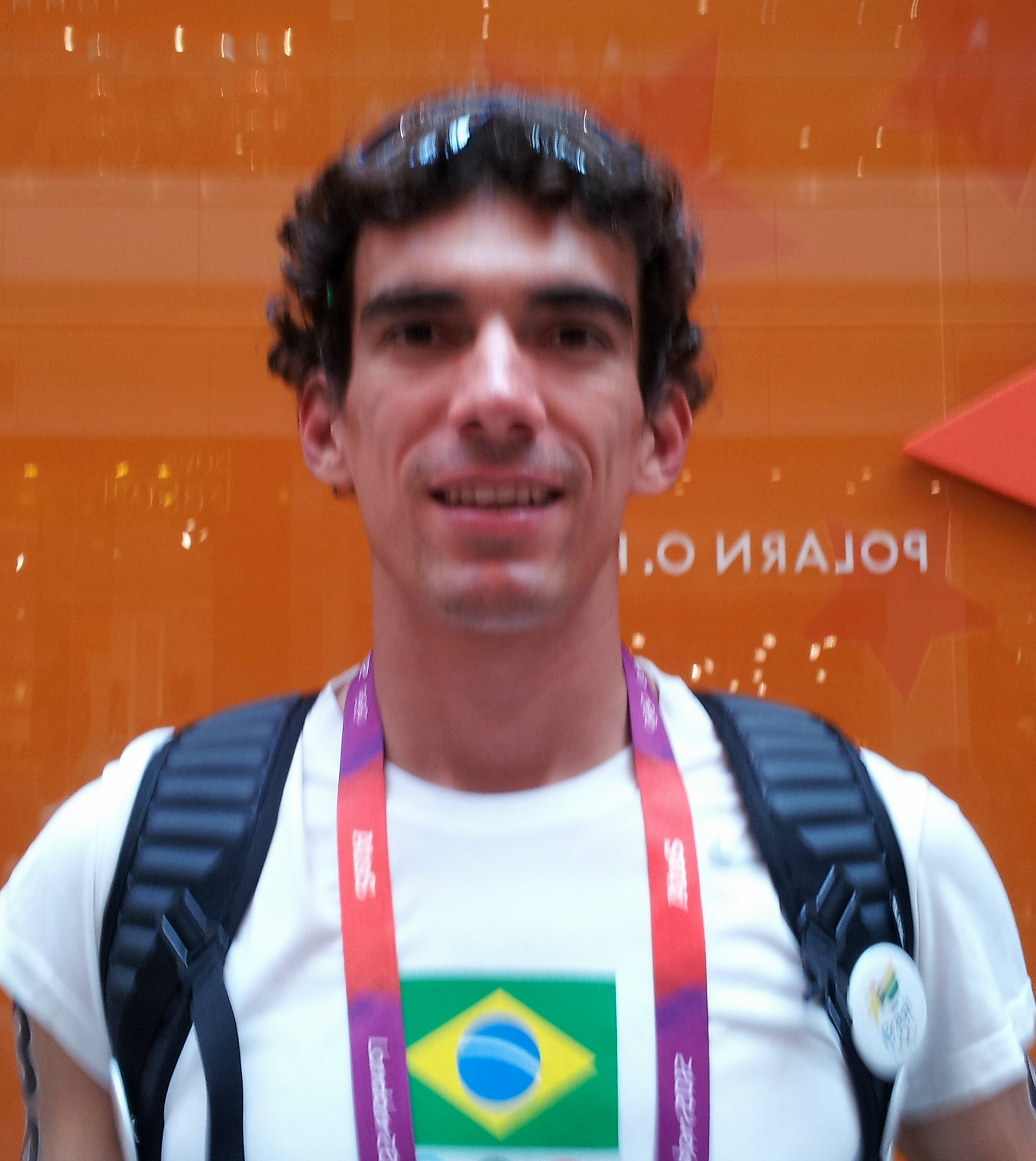
- Diogo Sclebin at the 2012 Olympics

Personal information
- Born: 6 May 1982 (age 43); Rio de Janeiro, Brazil

Sport
- Sport: Triathlon

Diogo Sclebin Costa Martins (born 6 May 1982) is a Brazilian triathlete.

At the 2012 Summer Olympics men's triathlon he placed 44th and 41st place at the men's triathlon at the 2016 Summer Olympics.
