= Ron Darmon =

Israeli Olympic triathlete

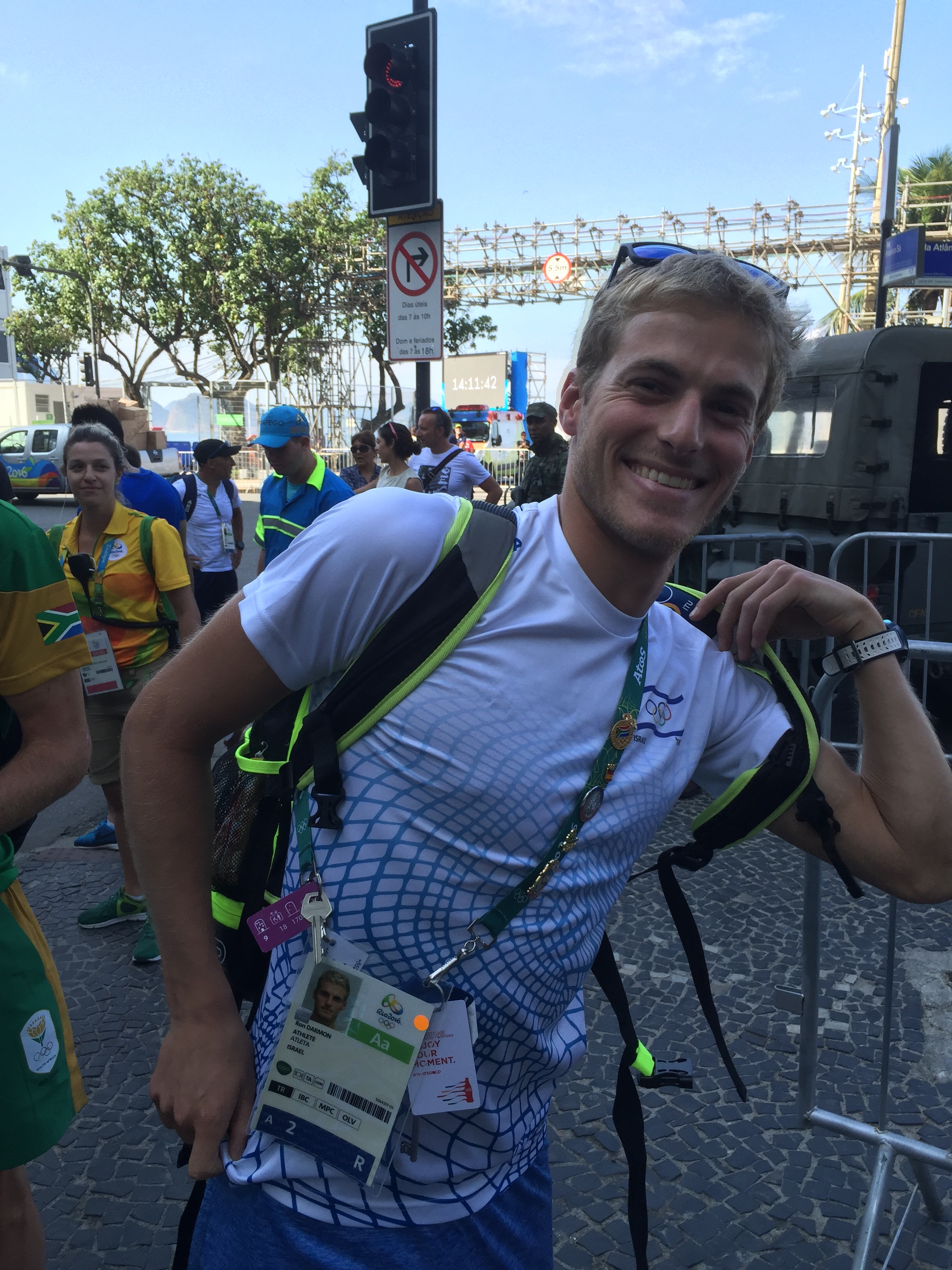

Personal information
- Native name: רון דרמון
- Born: October 30, 1992 (age 32); Beersheba, Israel
- Height: 177 cm (5 ft 10 in)
- Weight: 65 kg (143 lb)

Sport
- Country: Israel
- Sport: Triathlon
- Coached by: Warwick Dalziel

Ron Darmon (Hebrew: רון דרמון; born October 30, 1992) is an Israeli Olympic triathlete.

He represented Israel at the 2016 Summer Olympics in the triathlon. He came in 26th out of 55 competitors in 1:48:41, and was 3 minutes and 40 seconds behind the winner. He was the first Israeli triathlete to compete in the Olympic Games.

== Early life ==
Darmon was raised in the 7,000-person village of Lehavim, Israel, 15 kilometers north of Beersheba in the northern Negev Desert. It had only been in existence for nine years when he was born.

== Triathlon career ==
In the triathlon, which first made an appearance in the Olympics in the 2000 Summer Olympics, competitors swim 1.5 kilometers (.93 miles), bicycle 40 kilometers (24.8 miles), and then run 10 kilometers (6.2 miles).

Darmon started competing in triathlons when he was approximately nine years old, in 2006. He is coached by Warwick Dalziel.

Darmon placed 5th in the 2010 World Junior Triathlon Championships in Budapest, Hungary, won the 2010 Tiszaújváros ETU Triathlon Junior European Cup, and came in 4th in the 2011 World Junior Championships in Beijing, China.

In 2012 Darmon came in 5th in the Men's Chengdu International Triathlon Union (ITU) Triathlon Premium Asian Cup, and in 2013 he came in 3rd in the Men's Lantau ITU Triathlon Asian Cup. In February 2014 he came in 5th in the Men's Pegasus, New Zealand OTU Sprint Triathlon Oceania Cup, in August 2014 he came in 3rd in the Men's Istanbul ETU Triathlon European Cup and 3rd in the Men's Riga ETU Sprint Triathlon European Cup, and in October 2014 he came in 5th in the Men's Cozumel ITU Triathlon World Cup. In April 2015 he broke his collarbone and was unable to train for weeks, but in October 2015 he won the Men's Hong Kong ASTC Sprint Triathlon Asian Cup.

In 2016 he reached number 52 in the world rankings. That allowed Darmon to qualify for the 2016 Olympics, as the top 55 men qualify for the competition. In February 2016 he won the 2016 Takapuna OTU Sprint Triathlon Oceania Cup in New Zealand.

Darmon represented Israel at the 2016 Summer Olympics in Rio de Janeiro in the triathlon. He came in 26th out of 55 competitors in 1:48:41, and was 3 minutes and 40 seconds behind the winner. In December 2017 Darmon announced his retirement.

== See also ==
- Ran Sagiv, Israeli Olympic triathlete
- Shachar Sagiv, Israeli Olympic triathlete
