= Ryan Fisher (triathlete) =

Australian triathlete

Personal information
- Born: 5 April 1991 (age 35) Auchenflower, Queensland, Australia
- Height: 173 cm (5 ft 8 in)
- Weight: 64 kg (141 lb)

Sport
- Country: Australia
- Sport: Triathlon

Ryan Fisher (born 5 April 1991) is an Australian triathlete. He competed in the men's event at the 2016 Summer Olympics. He was selected for the 2016 team over Jacob Birtwhistle. In 2017, he competed in the first episode of Australian Ninja Warrior.
