= Miguel Arraiolos =

Portuguese triathlete (born 1988)

Personal information
- Full name: Miguel da Cunha Arraiolos
- Born: 12 July 1988 (age 37) Santarém, Portugal

Sport
- Country: Portugal
- Sport: Triathlon

Miguel da Cunha Arraiolos (born 12 July 1988) is a Portuguese triathlete. He competed in the men's event at the 2016 Summer Olympics.
