= Jolanda Annen =

Swiss triathlete (born 1992)

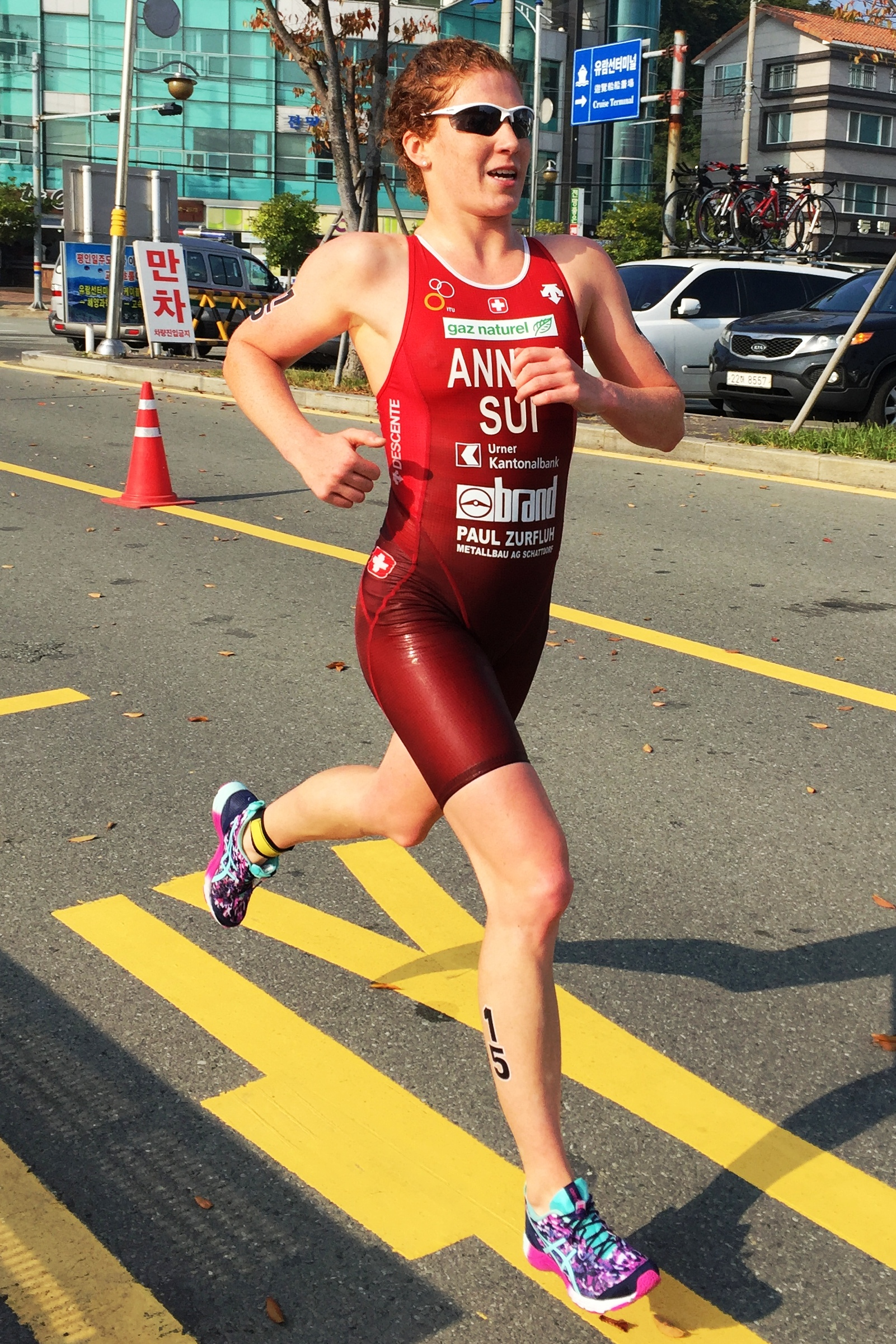
- Jolanda Annen in 2015

Personal information
- Born: 11 September 1992 (age 32); Schattdorf, Switzerland

Sport
- Country: Switzerland
- Sport: Triathlon

Jolanda Annen (born 11 September 1992) is a Swiss triathlete. She finished in first place at the 2016 ITU Triathlon World Cup event in Huatulco. She beat Agnieszka Jerzyk of Poland and Yuliya Yelistratov of Ukraine. This was Annen's first World Cup win, although she had taken silver in this race the year before. She competed in the women's event at the 2016 Summer Olympics. She is part of ECS Triathlon club.
