= Joe Maloy =

American triathlete

Personal information
- Born: December 20, 1985 (age 40) Somers Point, New Jersey, U.S.
- Education: Wildwood Catholic High School; Boston College
- Height: 5 ft 9 in (1.75 m)
- Weight: 141 lb (64 kg)
- Website: joetriathlon.com

Sport
- Country: United States
- Team: USA Triathlon

Joe Maloy (born December 20, 1985) is an American triathlete. Maloy represented the United States in triathlon at the Rio 2016 Summer Olympics.

Maloy was born in Somers Point, New Jersey and grew up in Wildwood Crest, New Jersey, where he attended Wildwood Catholic High School.

== Career highlights ==
The following list is based upon the Team USA Career highlights.

- 2016 World Champion Mixed Relay
- 2016 ITU World Triathlon Yokohama, 11th place
- 2016 ITU World Triathlon Gold Coast, 6th place
- 2016 Escape from Alcatraz Champion
- 2015 USA Triathlon Elite National, 4th place
- 2015 Noosa Triathlon Champion (1st American Male or Female to win title)
- 2014 Lifetime Fitness Oceanside Champion
- 2014 USA Triathlon Elite National champion
- 2014 Cozumel ITU World Cup bronze medalist
- 2013 USA Triathlon Elite Nationals silver medal

== ITU competitions ==
The following list is based upon the official ITU rankings and the ITU Athlete's Profile Page. Unless indicated otherwise, the following events are triathlons (Olympic Distance) and refer to the Elite category.

Date	Competition	Place	Rank
2010-03-20	Pan American Cup	Mazatlan	16
2010-05-22	Pan American Cup	Ixtapa	32
2010-09-25	Premium Pan American Cup	Tuscaloosa	18
2011-02-26	Pan American Cup and South American Championships	Salinas	8
2011-03-05	Sprint Triathlon Pan American Cup	Clermont	39
2011-03-27	Premium Pan American Cup	Valparaiso	10
2011-04-03	Pan American Cup	Lima	3
2011-05-28	Pan American Cup	Ixtapa	23
2011-06-12	Pan American Cup	Cartagena	2
2011-07-10	World Cup	Edmonton	DNF
2011-09-24	Pan American Cup	Buffalo	33
2012-04-21	Pan American Cup	Mazatlan	4
2012-05-06	World Cup	Huatulco	29
2012-06-02	Pan American Cup	Dallas	3
2012-07-07	Premium European Cup	Holten	13
2012-07-14	World Cup Semifinal #3	Tiszaujvaros	11
2012-07-21	Dextro Energy World Triathlon	Hamburg	54
2012-08-19	Premium Pan American Cup	Kelowna	3
2012-09-15	Pan American Cup	Buffalo	5
2012-10-07	World Triathlon Cup	Cancun	20
2013-03-09	Sprint Triathlon Pan American Cup	Clermont	12
2013-03-16	Pan American Cup	Sarasota	6
2013-03-20	USA Triathlon National Championships	Ohama	2
2013-04-19	World Cup	San Diego	20
2013-06-01	Pan American Cup	Dallas	4
2013-06-23	World Cup	Edmonton	9
2013-07-14	World Cup	Palamos	30
2013-07-20	World Triathlon	Hamburg	21
2013-08-10	World Cup Semifinal #3	Tiszaujvaros	2
2013-08-10	World Cup	Tiszaujvaros	19
2013-09-11	World Triathlon Grand Final	London	36
2013-10-12	World Cup	Tongyeong	5
2014-04-06	World Triathlon	Auckland	29
2014-05-10	World Cup	Chengdu	11
2014-05-17	World Triathlon	Yokohama	19
2014-05-31	PATCO Triathlon Pan American Championships	Dallas	27
2014-06-28	World Triathlon	Chicago	17
2014-06-29	USA Triathlon National Championships	Milwaukee	1
2014-07-26	World Cup	Jiayuguan	11
2014-08-29	World Triathlon Grand Final	Edmonton	17
2014-10-05	World Cup	Cozumel	3
2014-10-18	World Cup	Tongyeong	7
2015-03-22	World Cup	New Plymouth	10
2015-03-28	World Triathlon	Auckland	20
2015-04-25	World Triathlon	Cape Town	38
2015-05-09	World Cup	Chengdu	30
2015-05-15	World Triathlon	Yokohama	36
2015-08-02	World Olympic Qualification Event	Rio de Janeiro	16
2015-08-22	World Triathlon	Stockholm	22
2015-09-05	World Triathlon	Edmonton	48
2015-09-15	World Triathlon Grand Final	Chicago	54
2015-09-18	USA Triathlon National Championships	Milwaukee	4
2015-10-04	World Cup	Cozumel	7
2015-10-24	World Cup	Tongyeong	11
2016-03-05	World Triathlon	Abu Dhabi	49
2016-04-03	World Cup	New Plymouth	18
2016-04-09	World Triathlon	Gold Coast	6
2016-05-14	World Triathlon	Yokohama	11
2016-07-16	World Triathlon	Hamburg	28
2016-07-16	Mixed Relay World Championships	Hamburg	1
2016-08-18	Olympic Games	Rio de Janeiro	23
2016-09-11	World Triathlon Grand Final	Cozumel	47
