= Tony Dodds =

New Zealand triathlete (born 1987)

Tony Dodds (born 16 June 1987) is a New Zealand triathlete.

Dodds was born in 1987 in Balclutha and grew up in Wānaka.He attended high school at John McGlashan College in Dunedin. He came tenth at the Men's triathlon at the 2014 Commonwealth Games in Glasgow. While in Barcelona with the New Zealand team in July 2015, he had his belongings stolen twice. He represented New Zealand at the 2016 Summer Olympics.
