= Bryan Keane =

Irish triathlete

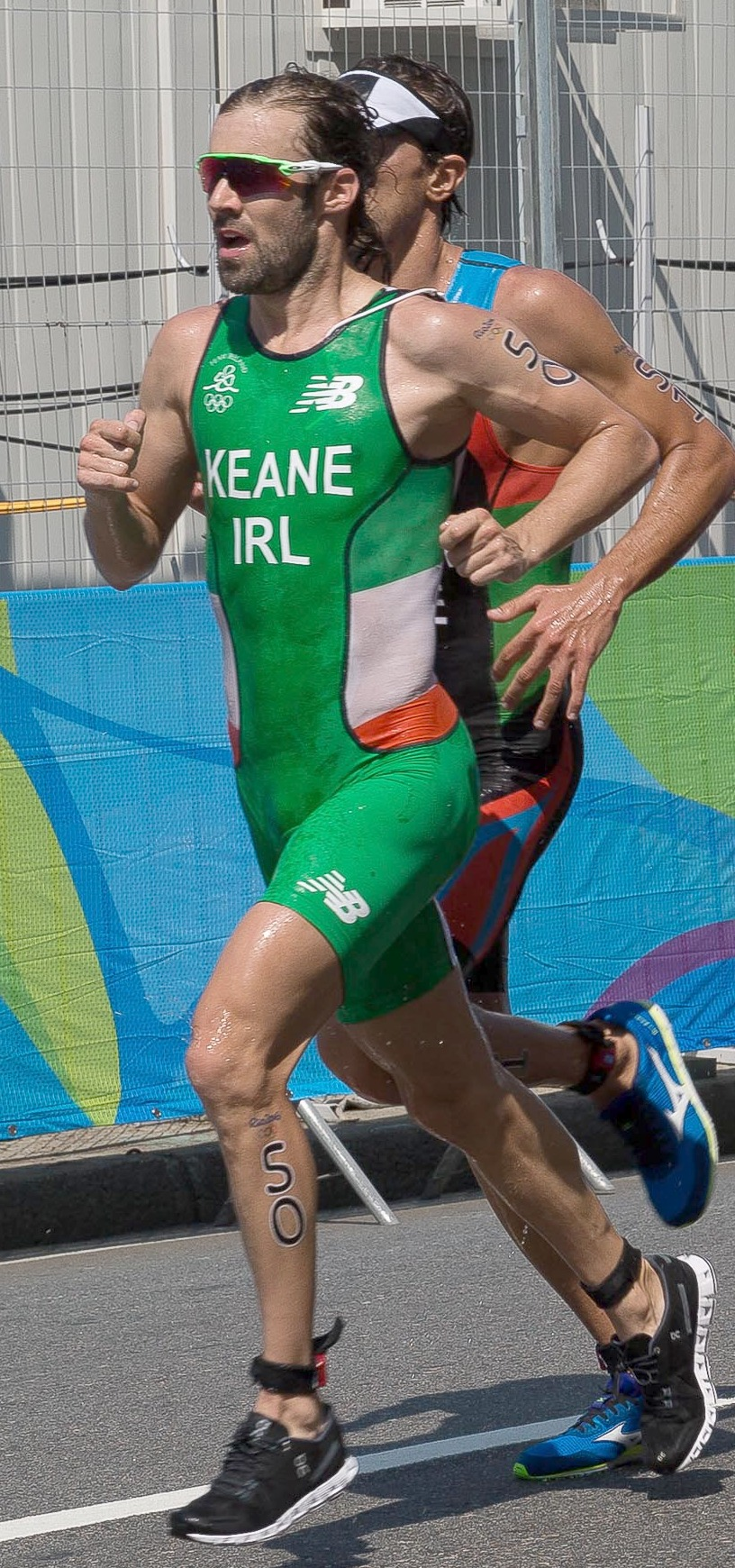
- Keane at the 2016 Olympics

Personal information
- Born: 20 August 1980 (age 45)
- Height: 175 cm (5 ft 9 in)
- Weight: 65 kg (143 lb)

Sport
- Sport: Triathlon
- Coached by: Tommy Evans
Medal record
Representing Ireland
European Cross Country Championships
Bronze medal – third place	2000 Malmö	Team

Bryan Keane (born 20 August 1980) is an Irish triathlete who won a team bronze medal at the 2000 European Cross Country Championships. He was placed 7th at the 2010 ITU Sprint Distance Triathlon World Championships and placed 40th at the 2016 Olympics.
