= Gábor Faldum =

Hungarian triathlete (born 1988)

Personal information
- Born: 24 June 1988 (age 36); Baja, Hungary
- Height: 172 cm (5 ft 8 in)
- Weight: 65 kg (143 lb)

Sport
- Country: Hungary
- Sport: Triathlon

Gábor Faldum (born 24 June 1988) is a Hungarian triathlete. He competed in the men's event at the 2016 Summer Olympics. In 2016 he joined ECS Triathlon, an elite club based in Sartrouville, France.
