= Andreas Schilling =

Danish triathlete (born 1991)

Personal information
- Born: 25 May 1991 (age 35) Fredericia, Denmark

Sport
- Sport: Triathlon
Medal record
Men's Duathlon
Representing Denmark
World Championships
Gold medal – first place	2018	Individual

Andreas Schilling (born 25 May 1991) is a Danish triathlete. He competed in the men's event at the 2016 Summer Olympics. He is the winner of the 2018 ITU Duathlon World Championships.
