= Agnieszka Jerzyk =

Polish triathlete (born 1988)

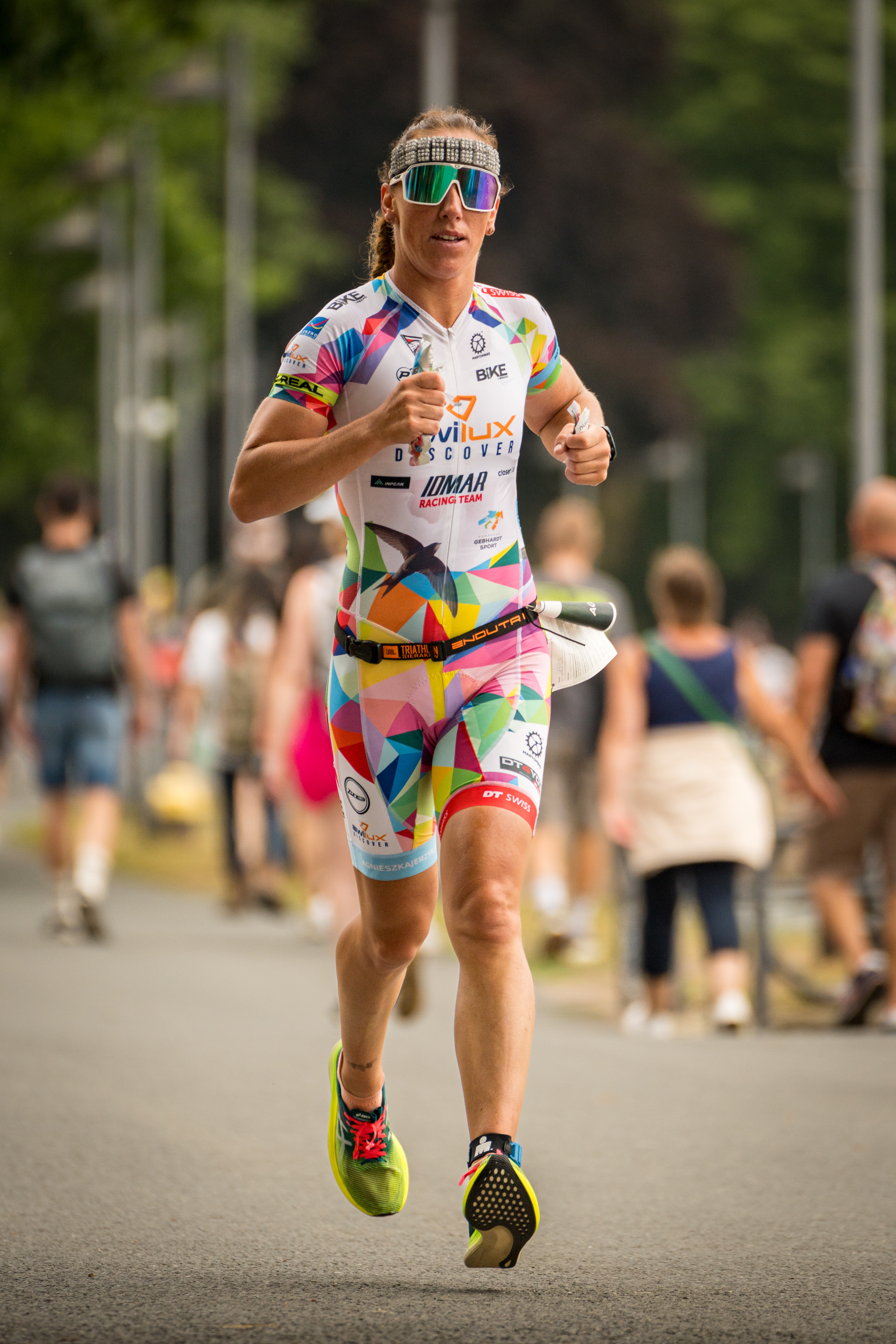
- Agnieszka Jerzyk at the 2023 Ironman European Championship in Frankfurt am Main (Germany).

Personal information
- Born: 15 January 1988 (age 37); Leszno, Poland

Sport
- Sport: Triathlon

Agnieszka Jerzyk (born 15 January 1988) is a Polish triathlete. She competed in the Women's event at the 2012 Summer Olympics, finishing in 25th, and 22nd at the 2016 Summer Olympics.
