= Tamás Tóth =

Hungarian triathlete

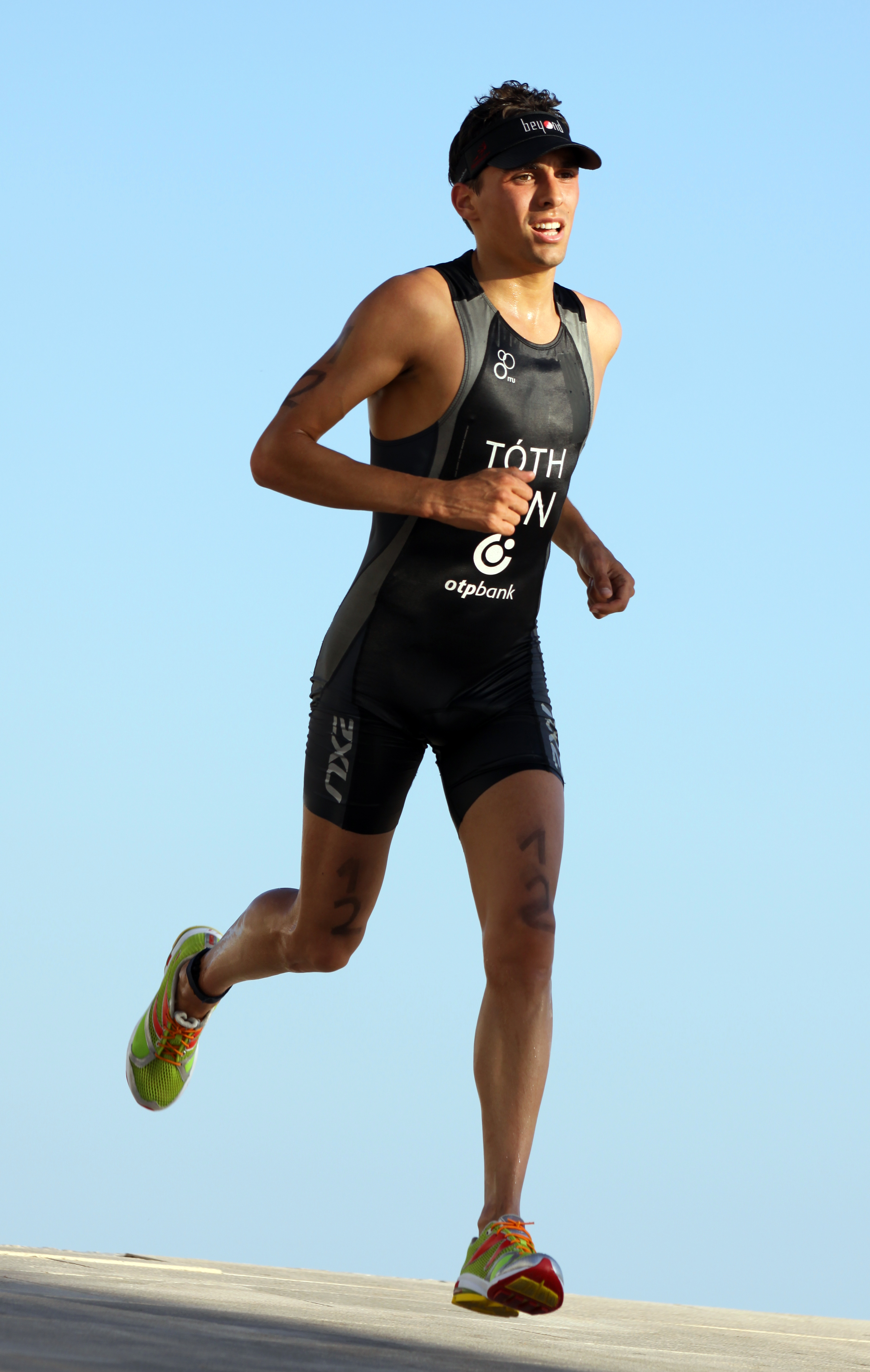
- Tamás Tóth at the European Cup elite triathlon in Quarteira, 2011.

Personal information
- National team: Hungary
- Born: 29 May 1989 (age 37) Budapest
- Height: 175 cm (5 ft 9 in)
- Weight: 65 kg (143 lb)

Sport
- Sport: Triathlon
- Team: Hungarian Olympic Team

Tamás Tóth (born 29 May 1989) is a Hungarian professional triathlete.

On 30 October 2018, the ITU (International Triathlon Union) announced a newly elected Athletes’ Committee which included five men and five women from eight different countries, Tamás Tóth was one of the elected members. Shortly thereafter, Tamás Tóth was elected as the Chair of the ITU Athletes’ Committee. Amongst other responsibilities, the ITU Athletes’ Committee carries on important work in support of upcoming Olympics games.

As of January 2021 Tamás Tóth had accomplished 114 starts, 7 Podiums, 3 Wins, had a World Ranking of 76 and a Continental ranking of 43.

During the 2016 Summer Olympic Games men's triathlon, Tamás placed 33rd and his fellow Hungarian countrymen Gabor Faldum placed 20th. In 2021, he competed in the men's triathlon at the 2020 Summer Olympics held in Tokyo, Japan.

Among the male Hungarian elite triathletes of the year 2010, Tóth was number 6 in the Ranglista. Like Zsófia Tóth, he was supported by the National High Performance Scheme, Héraklész.

He lives in Budapest and runs for Budaörsi Triatlon Klub Egyesület.

== ITU competitions ==
The following list is based upon the official ITU rankings and the ITU Athletes' Profile Page. Unless indicated otherwise, the following events are triathlons (Olympic Distance) and refer to the Elite category.

Results
Date	Pos	Event	Time	Category
2020-09-05	55	2020 Hamburg Wasser World Triathlon	0:53:38	Elite Men
2020-03-14	23	2020 Mooloolaba ITU Triathlon World Cup	0:53:13	Elite Men
2019-11-10	DNS	2019 Santo Domingo ITU Triathlon World Cup	DNS	Elite Men
2019-11-03	11	2019 Lima ITU Triathlon World Cup	0:53:08	Elite Men
2019-10-19	DNF	2019 Tongyeong ITU Triathlon World Cup	DNF	Elite Men
2019-09-21	8	2019 Weihai ITU Triathlon World Cup	1:55:33	Elite Men
2019-08-31	36	2019 ITU World Triathlon Grand Final Lausanne	1:56:50	Elite Men
2019-08-16	DNF	2019 Tokyo ITU World Triathlon Olympic Qualification Event	DNF	Elite Men
2019-07-20	20	2019 ITU World Triathlon Edmonton	0:56:09	Elite Men
2019-07-14	7	2019 Tiszaujvaros ITU Triathlon World Cup	0:54:04	Elite Men
2019-07-13	8	2019 Tiszaujvaros ITU Triathlon World Cup	0:33:42	Semifinal 2 Elite Men
2019-06-23	27	2019 Antwerp ITU Triathlon World Cup	1:01:22	Elite Men
2019-06-15	14	2019 Nur-Sultan ITU Triathlon World Cup	1:45:40	Elite Men
2019-05-18	20	2019 Cagliari ITU Triathlon World Cup	0:53:13	Elite Men
2019-05-05	DNF	2019 Madrid ITU Triathlon World Cup	DNF	Elite Men
2019-04-27	33	2019 MS Amlin World Triathlon Bermuda	1:55:19	Elite Men
2019-03-09	10	2019 Daman World Triathlon Mixed Relay Series Abu Dhabi	0:20:18	Mixed Relay
2018-10-27	14	2018 Funchal ETU Sprint Triathlon European Cup Final	0:54:08	Elite Men
2018-10-21	45	2018 Salinas ITU Triathlon World Cup	0:54:17	Elite Men
2018-10-13	DNF	2018 Sarasota-Bradenton ITU Triathlon World Cup	DNF	Elite Men
2018-10-06	5	2018 Lisbon ETU Triathlon Mixed Relay Clubs European Championships	0:20:33	Mixed Relay
2018-09-23	15	2018 Alanya ETU Triathlon European Cup	1:52:56	Elite Men
2018-09-16	34	2018 ITU World Triathlon Grand Final Gold Coast	1:49:00	Elite Men
2018-08-26	27	2018 ITU World Triathlon Montreal	1:51:26	Elite Men
2018-08-11	4	2018 Glasgow ETU Triathlon European Championships	0:17:47	Mixed Relay
2018-08-10	6	2018 Glasgow ETU Triathlon European Championships	1:48:53	Elite Men
2018-07-20	6	2018 Tartu ETU Triathlon European Championships	0:53:31	Elite Men
2018-07-08	DNF	2018 Tiszaujvaros ITU Triathlon World Cup	DNF	Elite Men
2018-07-07	1	2018 Tiszaujvaros ITU Triathlon World Cup	0:52:39	Semifinal 1 Elite Men
2018-06-10	27	2018 ITU World Triathlon Leeds	1:50:03	Elite Men
2018-06-06	11	2018 ITU World Triathlon Mixed Relay Series Nottingham	0:19:50	Mixed Relay
2018-05-19	27	2018 Astana ITU Triathlon World Cup	1:39:25	Elite Men
2018-05-12	30	2018 ITU World Triathlon Yokohama	1:48:05	Elite Men
2018-03-02	25	2018 ITU World Triathlon Abu Dhabi	0:58:54	Elite Men
2017-10-29	14	2017 Salinas ITU Triathlon World Cup	0:52:57	Elite Men
2017-07-23	6	2017 Tiszaujvaros ITU Triathlon World Cup	0:55:22	Elite Men
2017-07-22	5	2017 Tiszaujvaros ITU Triathlon World Cup	0:54:24	Semifinal 1 Elite Men
2017-07-16	14	2017 Hamburg ITU Triathlon Mixed Relay World Championships	0:20:32	Mixed Relay
2017-06-25	1	2017 Osaka NTT ASTC Sprint Triathlon Asian Cup	0:57:09	Elite Men
2017-06-18	1	2017 Gamagori NTT ASTC Sprint Triathlon Asian Cup	0:22:30	Elite Men
2017-06-18	1	2017 Gamagori NTT ASTC Sprint Triathlon Asian Cup	0:23:34	Semifinal 2 Elite Men
2017-06-04	DNF	2017 Cagliari ITU Triathlon World Cup	DNF	Elite Men
2017-04-08	DNF	2017 ITU World Triathlon Gold Coast	DNF	Elite Men
2017-04-02	20	2017 New Plymouth ITU Triathlon World Cup	0:57:04	Elite Men
2017-03-04	30	2017 ITU World Triathlon Abu Dhabi	2:00:04	Elite Men
2016-09-18	DNF	2016 ITU World Triathlon Grand Final Cozumel	DNF	Elite Men
2016-08-18	33	2016 Rio de Janeiro Olympic Games	1:50:02	Elite Men
2016-07-10	3	2016 Tiszaujvaros ITU Triathlon World Cup	0:54:11	Elite Men
2016-07-09	2	2016 Tiszaujvaros ITU Triathlon World Cup	0:54:29	Semifinal 3 Elite Men
2016-05-29	3	2016 Lisbon ETU Triathlon European Championships	0:15:47	Mixed Relay
2016-05-14	33	2016 ITU World Triathlon Yokohama	1:49:00	Elite Men
2016-05-08	13	2016 Cagliari ITU Triathlon World Cup	0:57:38	Elite Men
2016-04-24	11	2016 ITU World Triathlon Cape Town	0:54:59	Elite Men
2016-04-09	22	2016 ITU World Triathlon Gold Coast	1:49:10	Elite Men
2016-04-03	27	2016 New Plymouth ITU Triathlon World Cup	0:54:23	Elite Men
2016-03-05	25	2016 ITU World Triathlon Abu Dhabi	1:49:04	Elite Men
2015-10-24	DNF	2015 Tongyeong ITU Triathlon World Cup	DNF	Elite Men
2015-10-04	34	2015 Cozumel ITU Triathlon World Cup	0:56:17	Elite Men
2015-09-19	27	2015 ITU World Triathlon Grand Final Chicago	1:47:13	Elite Men
2015-09-06	DNF	2015 ITU World Triathlon Edmonton	DNF	Elite Men
2015-08-08	4	2015 Tiszaujvaros ITU Triathlon World Cup	0:54:30	Elite Men
2015-08-08	7	2015 Tiszaujvaros ITU Triathlon World Cup	0:56:05	Semifinal 1 Elite Men
2015-07-19	6	2015 Hamburg ITU Triathlon Mixed Relay World Championships	0:19:15	Mixed Relay
2015-07-18	21	2015 ITU World Triathlon Hamburg	0:53:15	Elite Men
2015-07-12	6	2015 Geneva ETU Triathlon European Championships	0:19:55	Mixed Relay
2015-07-11	10	2015 Geneva ETU Triathlon European Championships	1:54:59	Elite Men
2015-06-20	3	2015 HUN Sprint Triathlon National Championships	0:55:56	Elite Men
2015-06-14	23	2015 Huatulco ITU Triathlon World Cup	1:01:02	Elite Men
2015-05-16	30	2015 ITU World Triathlon Yokohama	1:49:27	Elite Men
2015-05-09	47	2015 Chengdu ITU Triathlon World Cup	1:49:11	Elite Men
2015-04-26	34	2015 ITU World Triathlon Cape Town	1:42:21	Elite Men
2015-03-22	38	2015 New Plymouth ITU Triathlon World Cup	0:54:53	Elite Men
2015-03-14	29	2015 Mooloolaba ITU Triathlon World Cup	0:56:30	Elite Men
2015-03-07	23	2015 ITU World Triathlon Abu Dhabi	0:53:59	Elite Men
2014-10-12	38	2014 Cartagena ITU Triathlon World Cup	1:51:49	Elite Men
2014-10-05	17	2014 Cozumel ITU Triathlon World Cup	0:52:38	Elite Men
2014-09-28	DNF	2014 Alanya ITU Triathlon World Cup	DNF	Elite Men
2014-08-09	20	2014 Tiszaujvaros ITU Triathlon World Cup	0:54:45	Elite Men
2014-08-09	4	2014 Tiszaujvaros ITU Triathlon World Cup	0:53:44	Semifinal 3 Elite Men
2014-07-26	24	2014 Jiayuguan ITU Triathlon World Cup	1:51:57	Elite Men
2014-07-13	3	2014 Hamburg ITU Triathlon Mixed Relay World Championships	0:19:08	Men Relay
2014-07-12	59	2014 ITU World Triathlon Hamburg	0:55:51	Elite Men
2014-06-22	4	2014 Kitzbühel ETU Triathlon European Championships	0:23:00	Mixed Relay
2014-06-21	30	2014 Kitzbühel ETU Triathlon European Championships	1:57:31	Elite Men
2014-06-07	2	2014 Shizuishan ASTC Triathlon Premium Asian Cup	1:48:18	Elite Men
2014-05-18	15	2014 Bratislava ETU Sprint Triathlon European Cup	0:57:43	Elite Men
2014-05-10	DNF	2014 Chengdu ITU Triathlon World Cup	DNF	Elite Men
2014-04-26	DNF	2014 Zhenjiang ASTC Triathlon Premium Asian Cup	0:00:00	Elite Men
2014-03-23	41	2014 New Plymouth ITU Triathlon World Cup	0:54:55	Elite Men
2014-03-15	29	2014 Mooloolaba ITU Triathlon World Cup	0:56:21	Elite Men
2013-10-12	16	2013 Tongyeong ITU Triathlon World Cup	1:53:19	Elite Men
2013-09-29	21	2013 Alicante ITU Triathlon World Cup	1:55:23	Elite Men
2013-09-15	DNF	2013 ITU World Triathlon Grand Final London	DNF	Elite Men
2013-08-24	DSQ	2013 ITU World Triathlon Stockholm	DSQ	Elite Men
2013-08-10	17	2013 Tiszaujvaros ITU Triathlon World Cup	0:57:26	Semifinal 4 Elite Men
2013-07-20	1	2013 Jiayuguan ITU Triathlon Premium Asian Cup	1:50:44	Elite Men
2013-07-06	36	2013 ITU World Triathlon Kitzbuehel	1:01:15	Elite Men
2013-06-15	31	2013 Alanya ETU Triathlon European Championships	1:48:58	Elite Men
2013-06-01	1	2013 HUN Triathlon National Championships	1:47:53	Elite Men
2013-05-18	8	2013 Chizhou ITU Triathlon Premium Asian Cup	1:54:16	Elite Men
2012-09-22	28	2012 Tongyeong ITU Triathlon World Cup	1:54:33	Elite Men
2012-09-02	7	2012 Aguilas ETU Triathlon U23 and Youth European Championships	0:27:10	Mixed U23 Relay
2012-09-01	31	2012 Aguilas ETU Triathlon U23 and Youth European Championships	1:57:48	U23 Men
2012-07-14	DNF	2012 Tiszaujvaros ITU Triathlon World Cup	0:00:00	Elite Men Semifinal 3
2012-06-10	DNF	2012 Gamagori ITU Triathlon Asian Cup	DNF	Elite Men
2012-06-03	10	2012 Amakusa ITU Triathlon Asian Cup	1:49:16	Elite Men
2012-05-06	40	2012 Huatulco ITU Triathlon World Cup	2:09:39	Elite Men
2012-04-21	DNF	2012 Eilat ETU Triathlon European Championships	DNF	Elite Men
2012-04-20	3	2012 Eilat ETU Triathlon European Championships	0:18:02	Mixed Relay
2021-04-07	15	2012 Larache ITU Sprint Triathlon African Cup	1:04:13	Elite Men
2011-10-28	13	2011 Eilat ETU Triathlon U23 European Championships	1:57:20	U23 Men
2011-10-15	10	2011 Larache ITU Sprint Triathlon African Cup	0:54:16	Elite Men
2011-09-10	19	2011 Dextro Energy Triathlon - ITU World Championship Grand Final Beijing	1:54:46	U23 Men
2011-08-21	7	2011 Lausanne ITU Triathlon Mixed Relay World Championships	0:17:01	Mixed Relay
2011-08-14	41	2011 Tiszaujvaros ITU Triathlon World Cup	1:51:47	Elite Men
2011-07-10	21	2011 Edmonton ITU Triathlon World Cup	1:48:36	Elite Men
2011-05-01	13	2011 Subic Bay ITU Triathlon Asian Cup	1:57:51	Elite Men
2011-04-09	22	2011 Quarteira ITU Triathlon European Cup	1:58:18	Elite Men
2011-03-27	6	2011 Valparaiso ITU Triathlon Premium Pan American Cup	1:52:04	Elite Men
2011-03-17	8	2011 Santiago ITU Triathlon Pan American Cup	1:49:40	Elite Men
2010-09-11	19	2010 Dextro Energy Triathlon - ITU Triathlon World Championship Grand Final Budapest	1:47:04	U23 Men
2010-09-08	4	2010 Budapest ITU Aquathlon World Championships	0:21:18	U23 Men
2010-08-28	28	2010 Vila Nova de Gaia ETU Triathlon U23 and Youth European Championships	1:59:21	U23 Men
2010-08-21	DNF	2010 Lausanne ITU Elite Sprint Triathlon World Championships	DNF	Elite Men
2010-07-03	12	2010 Beijing ITU Triathlon Premium Asian Cup	2:01:46	Elite Men
2010-05-30	24	2010 Valencia FISU World University Triathlon Championships	1:46:51	Elite Men
2010-05-30	11	2010 Valencia FISU World University Triathlon Championships	1:46:51	Men Team
2010-05-22	40	2010 Senec ITU Triathlon European Cup	1:56:53	Elite Men
2010-04-18	15	2010 Antalya ITU Triathlon European Cup	1:52:52	Elite Men
2009-08-30	30	2009 Kedzierzyn Kozle ITU Triathlon Premium European Cup	1:57:18	Elite Men
2009-08-23	21	2009 Karlovy Vary ITU Triathlon European Cup	1:52:36	Elite Men
2009-06-20	43	2009 Tarzo ETU Triathlon U23 and Youth European Championships	1:58:13	U23 Men
2009-05-23	12	2009 Budapest ETU Duathlon European Championships	1:58:17	U23 Men
2008-09-20	12	2008 Belgrade ETU Triathlon European Cup and Balkan Championships	1:55:30	Elite Men
2008-09-13	10	2008 Bled ETU Triathlon Junior European Cup	0:39:00	Junior Men
2008-07-12	2	2008 Tiszaujvaros ETU Triathlon Junior European Cup	0:58:11	Junior Men
2008-06-05	59	2008 Vancouver BG Triathlon World Championships	1:05:42	Junior Men
2008-05-10	20	2008 Lisbon ETU Triathlon European Championships	1:00:37	Junior Men
2007-08-31	28	2007 Hamburg BG Triathlon World Championships	0:56:36	Junior Men
2007-08-12	7	2007 Tiszaujvaros ETU Triathlon Junior European Cup	0:57:02	Junior Men
2007-05-19	26	2007 Gyor ITU Duathlon World Championships	0:53:56	Junior Men
2001-09-08	29	2001 Venray ITU Powerman Long Distance Duathlon World Championships	3:02:28	Elite Men

DNF = did not finish · DNS = did not start
