= Andrea Salvisberg =

Swiss triathlete

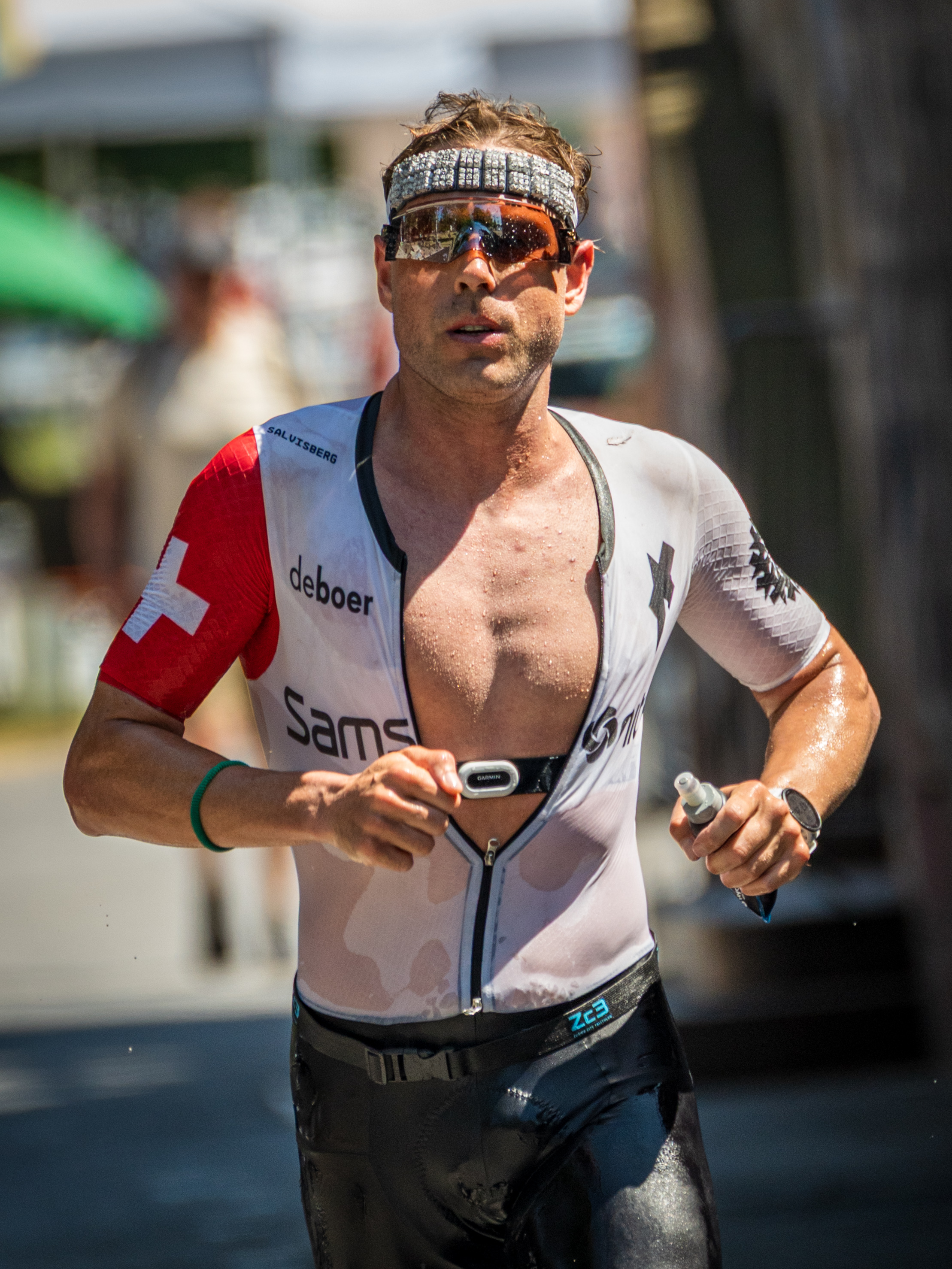
Andrea Salvisberg at the 2025 Ironman European Championship in Frankfurt am Main (Germany).

Andrea Nicolas Salvisberg (born 1 February 1989 in Rüegsauschachen, Rüegsau) is a professional Swiss triathlete and a member of the National Team (Team Olympic Distance). Salvisberg is the Swiss Junior Champion of the years 2007 and 2008, and the Swiss U23 Champion of 2010.

In Switzerland, Andrea Nicolas Salvisberg, like two of his three brothers (Florin and Lukas Salvisberg), is a member of ewz power team.

Andrea Salvisberg lives in Hasle-Rüegsau.

== ITU Competitions ==
The following list is based upon the official ITU rankings and the ITU Athletes's Profile Page. Unless indicated otherwise, the following events are triathlons (Olympic Distance) and refer to the Elite category.

Date	Competition	Place	Rank
23 June 2006	European Championships (Junior)	Autun	30
29 June 2007	European Championships (Junior)	Copenhagen	23
21 July 2007	Junior European Cup	Kuopio	DNS
30 August 2007	BG World Championships (Junior)	Hamburg	32
10 May 2008	European Championships (Junior)	Lisbon	32
13 September 2008	European Cup	Vienna	26
20 June 2009	European Championships (U23)	Tarzo Revine	36
2 August 2009	European Cup	Eğirdir	7
22 August 2009	Dextro Energy World Championship Series	Yokohama	22
11 April 2010	European Cup	Quarteira	22
22 May 2010	European Cup	Senec	8
30 May 2010	African Cup	Larache	13
27 June 2010	Premium European Cup	Brasschaat	45
10 July 2010	World Cup	Holten	30
24 July 2010	Dextro Energy World Championship Series	London	52
21 August 2010	Sprint World Championships	Lausanne	42
28 August 2010	European Championships (U23)	Vila Nova de Gaia	15
8 September 2010	Dextro Energy World Championship Series, Grand Final: U23 World Championships	Budapest	17
17 April 2011	World Cup	Ishigaki	34
29 May 2011	Premium European Cup	Brasschaat	DNF
12 June 2011	Sprint European Cup	Cremona	11
24 June 2011	European Championships	Pontevedra	46
24 July 2011	European Cup	Geneva	24
14 August 2011	World Cup	Tiszaújváros	47
