= 2025 T100 Triathlon World Tour =

- League: T100 Triathlon World Tour
- Sport: Triathlon (long distance)
- Duration: 5 April – 12 December 2025
- Teams: 40 contracted professionals (20 men, 20 women)

Qatar T100 Grand Final
- Champions: (United Kingdom) Kate Waugh (Women) (New Zealand) Hayden Wilde (Men)

Seasons
- ← 2024 2026 →

2025 T100 Triathlon World Tour was the second full season of the T100 series, a professional triathlon circuit organized by the Professional Triathletes Organisation (PTO) in partnership with World Triathlon. The series consisted of nine elite races over the T100 distance and held across five continents, culminating in the Qatar T100 World Championship Final on 12 December 2025.

== Background ==
The T100 Triathlon World Tour was launched in 2023 to establish a standardized global circuit for long-distance triathlon. Each race is contested over a 100 km format (2 km swim, 80 km bike, 18 km run).

For 2025, the PTO confirmed:

- Nine races across iconic global venues.
- 40 contracted professionals (20 men, 20 women), supplemented by “Hot Shots” and wildcards.
- Prize pool exceeding US$7 million, with US$250,000 per race and US$200,000 awarded to each world champion.
- Points system: athletes’ best four race results plus the Grand Final determined overall standings.

== Format ==
- Each race featured 20 men and 20 women, drawn from contracted athletes, PTO World Rankings, and wildcards.
- Athletes were required to contest at least four races plus the Grand Final.
- Standings were calculated from the best four scores plus Grand Final points, with double points available in Qatar.

== Season Summary ==
The 2025 calendar featured nine stops from April to December:

Race	Date	Location	Notes	Men's winner	Women's winner
I	5–6 April	Singapore	Season opener	Hayden Wilde (NZL)	Kate Waugh (GBR)
II	31 May	San Francisco, USA		Rico Bogen (GER)	Julie Derron (SUI)
III	14 June	Vancouver, Canada		Jelle Geens (BEL)	Taylor Knibb (USA)
IV	9 August	London, UK		Hayden Wilde (NZL)	Lucy Charles-Barclay (GBR)
V	30 August	French Riviera, France		Hayden Wilde (NZL)	Ashleigh Gentle (AUS)
VI	20 September	Spain		Hayden Wilde (NZL)	Lucy Charles-Barclay (GBR)
VII	18 October	Wollongong, Australia	see World Triathlon Championship Series	Hayden Wilde (NZL)	Kate Waugh (GBR)
VIII	15 November	Dubai, UAE		Morgan Pearson (USA)	Julie Derron (SUI)
IX	12 December	Doha, Qatar	Grand Final	Hayden Wilde (NZL)	Kate Waugh (GBR)
	Overall			Hayden Wilde (NZL)	Kate Waugh (GBR)

=== Women’s Tour ===
Kate Waugh of Great Britain won the overall women's title in her debut T100 season, clinching victory at the Grand Final in Qatar. Waugh's season included wins in the grand final in Qatar, Singapore and Wollongong, plus podiums at multiple stops. Swiss Julie Derron and Briton Lucy Charles-Barclay finished second and third overall, with both claiming two wins on the circuit.

=== Men’s Tour ===
Hayden Wilde of New Zealand, the Olympic silver medallist from 2024, dominated the men's circuit, winning six of seven starts and securing the world title at the Qatar Grand Final. Having won the season opener in Singapore, Wilde overcame a mid-season injury, returning to win in London, the French Riviera, Spain, and Wollongong before victory in the Grand finals.

The Dubai race was marred by confusion over bike laps and run distances, with American Morgan Pearson awarded victory after officials corrected timing errors. Pearson went on to place second overall for the season.

== See also ==
- 2025 World Triathlon Championship Series, official world championship organised and recognised by World Triathlon over the 'standard' or 'Olympic' distance (with some sprint distance races).
