= 2024 in triathlon =

This page lists notable triathlon events taking place in 2024.

== Olympic Games & Area Games ==
- March 15: 2023 African Games in (Ghana) Accra
- July 30 - August 5: 2024 Summer Olympics in (France) Paris

Games	Gold	Silver	Bronze
Men's individual	Alex Yee; Great Britain	Hayden Wilde; New Zealand	Léo Bergère; France
Women's individual	Cassandre Beaugrand; France	Julie Derron; Switzerland	Beth Potter; Great Britain
Mixed relay	Germany; Tim Hellwig; Lisa Tertsch; Lasse Lührs; Laura Lindemann	United States; Seth Rider; Taylor Spivey; Morgan Pearson; Taylor Knibb	Great Britain; Alex Yee; Georgia Taylor-Brown; Sam Dickinson; Beth Potter

== 2024 World Triathlon Championship Series ==
Men's and women's individual

Event	Gold	Silver	Bronze
Abu Dhabi	Event cancelled		
Yokohama	Morgan Pearson (USA)	Matthew Hauser (AUS)	Luke Willian (AUS)
Yokohama	Léonie Périault (FRA)	Taylor Knibb (USA)	Emma Lombardi (FRA)
Cagliari	Alex Yee (GBR)	Hayden Wilde (NZL)	Csongor Lehmann (HUN)
Cagliari	Cassandre Beaugrand (FRA)	Lisa Tertsch (GER)	Beth Potter (GBR)
Hamburg	Matthew Hauser (AUS)	Vasco Vilaça (POR)	Pierre Le Corre (FRA)
Hamburg	Cassandre Beaugrand (FRA)	Lisa Tertsch (GER)	Beth Potter (GBR)
Montreal	Event cancelled		
Weihai	Alex Yee (GBR)	Léo Bergère (FRA)	Miguel Hidalgo (BRA)
Weihai	Lisa Tertsch (GER)	Beth Potter (GBR)	Georgia Taylor-Brown (GBR)
Torremolinos^{Grand Final}	Hayden Wilde (NZL)	Léo Bergère (FRA)	Alex Yee (GBR)
Torremolinos^{Grand Final}	Cassandre Beaugrand (FRA)	Beth Potter (GBR)	Emma Lombardi (FRA)
Overall	Alex Yee (GBR)	Hayden Wilde (NZL)	Léo Bergère (FRA)
Overall	Cassandre Beaugrand (FRA)	Beth Potter (GBR)	Emma Lombardi (FRA)

Mixed relay

Event	Gold	Silver	Bronze
Abu Dhabi	Event cancelled		
Montreal	Event cancelled		
Hamburg; 2024 World Mixed Relay Championship	Germany Henry Graf; Lisa Tertsch; Lasse Lührs; Annika Koch	Switzerland Max Studer; Julie Derron; Simon Westermann; Cathia Schär	New Zealand Tayler Reid; Ainsley Thorpe; Dylan McCullough; Nicole van der Kaay

== 2024 World Triathlon Cup ==
Date	Place	Event	Men's elite winner	Women's elite winner	N
February 24	(New Zealand) Napier	WTC #1	(Australia) Callum McClusky	(Australia) Sophie Linn	
March 24	Hong Kong	WTC #2	(Spain) Alberto Gonzalez Garcia	(United Kingdom) Sian Rainsley	
April 20	(Australia) Wollongong	WTC #3	(Australia) Luke Willian	(Sweden) Tilda Mansson	
April 29	(China) Chengdu	WTC #4	(United Kingdom) Max Stapley	(Sweden) Julie Derron	
May 18 & 19	(Mexico) Huatulco	WTC #5	(Netherlands) Richard Murray	(Denmark) Alberte Kjær Pedersen	
May 18 & 19	(Uzbekistan) Samarkand	WTC #6	(United Kingdom) Connor Bentley	(Germany) Lena Meißner	
July 6 & 7	(Hungary) Tiszaújváros	WTC #7	(Hungary) Csongor Lehmann	(Germany) Annika Koch	
September 7 & 8	(Czech Republic) Karlovy Vary	WTC #8	(United States) John Reed	(Netherlands) Maya Kingma	
September 14 & 15	(Spain) Valencia	WTC #9	(Spain) David Cantero del Campo	(Germany) Lisa Tertsch	
September 27	(China) Weihai	WTC #10	cancelled		
October 5 & 6	(Italy) Rome	WTC #11	Yanis Seguin (FRA)	Nina Eim (GER)	
October 12 & 13	(Morocco) Tangier	WTC #12	cancelled		
October 26	(South Korea) Tongyeong	WTC #13	Dylan McCullough (NZL)	Jolien Vermeylen (BEL)	
October 26 & 27	(Brazil) Brasília	WTC #14	Manoel Messias (BRA)	Rosa Maria Tapia Vidal (MEX)	
November 2 & 3	(Chile) Viña del Mar	WTC #15	cancelled		
November 9 & 10	(Japan) Miyazaki	WTC #16	Maxime Hueber-Moosbrugger (FRA)	Gwen Jorgensen (USA)	

== World Triathlon Championships ==
- July 13 & 14: World Triathlon Mixed Relay Championships in (Germany) Hamburg
- August 15 - 25: World Triathlon Multisport Championships in (Australia) Townsville
- August 30 & 31: FISU World University Triathlon Championships in (Poland) Gdańsk
- September 8: World Triathlon Powerman Long Distance Duathlon Championships in (Switzerland) Zofingen
- October 17 - 20: World Triathlon Age-Group Aquabike Championships in (Spain) Torremolinos
- October 17 - 20: World Triathlon Age-Group Championships in (Spain) Torremolinos

== Continental Triathlon Championships ==
- February 24 & 25: Oceania Triathlon Junior Championships in Napier
  - Winners: (Australia) Jack Woodberry (m) / (Australia) Aspen Anderson (w)
  - Mixed relay Winners: Team I New Zealand
- March 8: Americas Triathlon Championships in (United States) Miami
  - Elite winners: (United States) Morgan Pearson (m) / (Ecuador) Elizabeth Bravo (w)
  - U23 winners: (United States) John Reed (m) / (Mexico) Luisa Daniela Baca (w)
  - Junior winners: (United States) Reese Vannerson (m) / (Canada) Sidney Clement (w)
- March 16 & 17: Oceania Triathlon Sprint Championships in Devonport
  - Elite winners: (New Zealand) Dylan McCullough (m) / (Australia) Jaz Hedgeland (w)
  - U23 winners: (New Zealand) Dylan McCullough (m) / (New Zealand) Brea Roderick (w)
  - Mixed relay winners: Team I Australia
- April 6 & 7: Asia Triathlon Sprint Championships in (China) Dexing
- April 14: Oceania Triathlon Championships in (New Zealand) Taupō
- April 19: Africa Triathlon Championships in (Egypt) Hurghada
- April 20: Africa Triathlon Aquathlon Championships in (Egypt) Hurghada
- April 21: Africa Triathlon Sprint Duathlon Championships in (Egypt) Hurghada
- April 21: Asia Triathlon Championships in (Japan) Hatsukaichi
- May 3: Oceania Triathlon Super-Sprint Championships in (Australia) Gold Coast
- May 5: Europe Triathlon Powerman Middle Distance Duathlon Championships in (Germany) Alsdorf
- June 14-22: Europe Triathlon Multisport Championships in (Portugal) Coimbra
- June 15 & 16: Americas Sprint Duathlon Championships in (Colombia) Cali
- June 23: Africa Triathlon Cross Championships in (Tunisia) Chebba
- July 6 & 7: Central Asia Triathlon Youth Championships in (Kazakhstan) Kokshetau
- August 1-4: Europe Triathlon Youth Championships Festival in (Lithuania) Panevėžys
- August 3: Europe Triathlon Baltic Championships in (Lithuania) Panevėžys
- August 9-11: Europe Triathlon Sprint & Relay Championships in (Turkey) Balıkesir
- September 8: Europe Triathlon Mixed Relay Club Championships in (Spain) Banyoles
- September 14: Europe Triathlon Challenge Long Distance Championships in (Netherlands) Almere
- September 21 & 22: Europe Triathlon Championships in (France) Vichy
- October 12: Asia Triathlon U15 and Youth Championships in Hong Kong
- October 12: Asia Triathlon Cup Championships in Hong Kong
- November 1 & 2: Multisport Asia Championships in (Jordan) Aqaba
- November 8 & 9: Asia Triathlon Junior, U23 & Mixed Relay Championships in (Saudi Arabia) Khobar
- November 9 & 10: Americas Duathlon Championships in (Dominican Republic) Santo Domingo
- November 23: Africa Triathlon Middle Distance Championships in (Senegal) Cap Skirring

== Regional Triathlon Championships ==
- September 28 & 29: Europe Triathlon Mediterranean Championships in (Malta) Salini
- October 5: Europe Triathlon Balkan Championships in (Romania) Mamaia
- December 14: Africa Triathlon Regional Championships in (Sierra Leone) Freetown

== Continental Triathlon Cups ==
=== African Triathlon Cups ===
- February 17: African Triathlon Cup #1 in (Zimbabwe) Troutbeck
  - Winners: (Kazakhstan) Ayan Beisenbayev (m) / (Republic of Ireland) Elizabeth Carr (w)
- February 23 & 24: African Triathlon Cup #2 in (Egypt) Sharm El Sheikh
  - Winners: (Belgium) Erwin Vanderplancke (m) / (Austria) Therese Feuersinger (w)
- February 23 & 24: African Duathlon Cup #1 in (Egypt) Sharm El Sheikh
  - Winners: (Australia) Samuel Mileham (m) / (Egypt) Somaya Embaby (w)
- February 23 & 24: African Aquathlon Cup in (Egypt) Sharm El Sheikh
  - Winners: (Bulgaria) Alexander Bozhilov (m) / (Bulgaria) Selena Vlahova (w)
- March 3: African Triathlon Cup #3 in (South Africa) Maselspoort
  - Winners: (South Africa) Nicholas Quenet (m) / (South Africa) Vicky van der Merwe (w)
- March 23: African Triathlon Cup #4 in (Namibia) Swakopmund
  - Winners: (South Africa) Jamie Riddle (m) / (South Africa) Vicky van der Merwe (w)
- April 7: African Triathlon Premium Cup #5 in (South Africa) Nelson Mandela Bay Metropolitan Municipality
  - Winners: (South Africa) Jamie Riddle (m) / (South Africa) Vicky van der Merwe (w)
- April 27: African Triathlon Cup in (Mauritius) Blue Bay
  - Event was cancelled
- April 28: African Duathlon Cup #2 in (Kenya) Nairobi
  - Winners: (Kenya) Joseph Okal (m) / (Kenya) Bernice Kariuki (w)
- May 3 & 4: African Triathlon Cup #6 in (Tunisia) Hammamet
- July 7: African Triathlon Premium Cup #7 in (Morocco) Larache
- September 8: African Triathlon Cup #8 in (Tunisia) Monastir
- September 22: African Triatlon Cup #9 in (Morocco) Agadir
- October 20: African Triathlon Cup #10 in (Tunisia) La Perle de Lac Tunis
- November 24: African Triathlon Cup #11 in (Kenya) Kilifi

=== Americas Triathlon Cups ===
- February 16-18: Americas Triathlon Cup in (Venezuela) La Guaira
  - Winners: (Romania) Felix Duchampt (m) / (Poland) Roksana Słupek (w)
- February 25: Americas Triathlon Cup #1 in (Cuba) Havana
  - Winners: (Republic of Ireland) James Edgar (m) / (United States) Gwen Jorgensen (w)
- March 16: Americas Triathlon Cup #2 in (Mexico) La Paz
  - Winners: (Mexico) Aram Peñaflor Moysen (m) / (Mexico) Rosa Tapia Vidal (w)
- March 17: Americas Triathlon Cup #3 in (Barbados) Bridgetown
  - Winners: (United States) Reese Vannerson (m) / (Austria) Lisa Perterer (w)
- March 31: Americas Triathlon Cup #4 in (Chile) Viña del Mar
  - Winners: (United States) Ka'eo Kruse (m) / (Cuba) Leslie Amat Alvarez (w)
- April 14: Americas Triathlon Cup #5 in (Ecuador) Salinas
  - Winners: (Canada) Pavlos Antoniades (m) / (South Africa) Amber Schlebusch (w)
- April 27 & 28: Americas Triathlon Cup #6 & South American Championships in (Venezuela) La Guaira
  - Winners: (Chile) Mateo Mendoza (m) / (Slovakia) Ivana Kuriačková (w)
- May 4 & 5: Americas Triathlon Cup #7 & Para Cup in (Colombia) Calima
- May 11 & 12: Americas Triathlon Cup #8 in (Chile) Iquique
- June 8: Americas Triathlon Cup #9 in (Mexico) Ixtapa
- June 22 & 23: Americas Triathlon Cup #10 & Central America and Caribbean Championships in (Dominican Republic) Punta Cana
- July 13 & 14: Americas Triathlon Cup #11 in (Canada) Magog
- August 3: Americas Triathlon Cup #12 in (Colombia) Riohacha
- August 24 & 25: Americas Triathlon Cup #13 in (Canada) Edmonton
- September 7: Americas Triathlon Cup #14 in (Colombia) Santa Marta
- September 14 & 15: Americas Triathlon Cup #15 in (Canada) Montreal
- October 12: Americas Triathlon Cup #16 in (Ecuador) Manta
- November 3: Americas Triathlon Cup #17 in (Chile) Viña del Mar

=== Asia Triathlon Cups ===
- February 25: Asia Triathlon Cup #1 in (Malaysia) Putrajaya
  - Winners: (Australia) Christopher Deegan (m) / (Switzerland) Julie Derron (w)
- March 24: Asia Triathlon Cup in Hong Kong
  - Event was cancelled
- April 27: Asia Triathlon Cup #2 & South Asian Triathlon Championships in (Nepal) Pokhara
  - Winners: (Egypt) Siefeldeen Ismail (m) / (Iceland) Edda Hannesdóttir (w)
- May 4: Asia Triathlon Cup #3 in (Philippines) Subic Bay
- May 11: Asia Triathlon Cup #4 in (China) Taizhou
- May 18: Asia Triathlon Cup #5 in (China) Lianyungang
- May 26: Asia Triathlon Cup #6 in (Japan) Osaka
- June 23: Asia Triathlon Cup #7 in (Japan) Gamagōri
- July 6 & 7: Asia Triathlon Cup #8 in (Kazakhstan) Kokshetau
- September 7: Asia Triathlon Cup #9 in (Chinese Taipei) Yilan
- September 14: Asia Triathlon Cup #10 in (Kyrgyzstan) Cholpon-Ata
- September 22: Asia Triathlon Cup #11 in (Japan) Tokyo
- October 5: Asia Triathlon Cup #12 & Central Asia Triathlon Championships in (Kazakhstan) Turkestan
- October 12: Asia Triathlon Cup #13 Championships in Hong Kong
- October 17 & 18: Asia Sprint Duathlon Cup & Central Asia Sprint Duathlon Championships in (Iran) Tabriz
- October 19: Asia Triathlon Cup #14 in (China) Wuxi
- October 26: Asia Triathlon Cup #15 in (China) Xiamen
- November 2: Asia Triathlon Cup #16 in (Malaysia) Kota Kinabalu
- November 23: Asia Triathlon Cup #17 in (China) Shenzhen

=== Europe Triathlon Cups ===
- March 23: Europe Triathlon Cup #1 in (Portugal) Quarteira
  - Winners: (United Kingdom) Hugo Milner (m) / (Germany) Lisa Tertsch (w)
- April 14: Europe Triathlon Cup #2 in (Spain) Melilla
  - Winners: (United Kingdom) Cameron Main (m) / (France) Emma Lombardi (w)
- May 11: Europe Triathlon Cup #3 in (Italy) Caorle
- May 25: Europe Triathlon Cup #4 in (Poland) Olsztyn
- June 1: Europe Triathlon Cup #5 in (Spain) Vigo
- June 2: Europe Triathlon Cup #6 in (Poland) Kielce
- June 8: Europe Triathlon Cup #7 in (Poland) Rzeszów
- June 14 & 15: Europe Triathlon Cup #8 in (Austria) Kitzbühel
- June 22: Europe Triathlon Cup #9 in (Austria) Wels
- June 29: Europe Triathlon Premium Cup #10 in (Netherlands) Holten
- July 13: Europe Triathlon Cup #11 in (Republic of Ireland) Cork
- August 31: Europe Triathlon Cup #12 in (Turkey) Istanbul
- October 6: Europe Triathlon Cup #13 in (Spain) Ceuta
- October 26: Europe Triathlon Cup #14 in (Turkey) Alanya

=== Oceania Triathlon Cups ===
- February 16: Oceania Triathlon Cup #1 in (New Zealand) Wānaka
  - Winners: (Italy) Alessio Crociani (m) / (Italy) Ilaria Zane (w)

== Continental Junior Triathlon Cups ==
=== African Junior Triathlon Cups ===
- February 17: African Junior Triathlon Cup #1 in (Zimbabwe) Troutbeck
  - Winners: (South Africa) Nicholas Horne (m) / (South Africa) Anika Visser (w)
- February 23 & 24: African Junior Triathlon Cup #2 in (Egypt) Sharm El Sheikh
  - Winners: (Bulgaria) Alexander Bozhilov (m) / (Bulgaria) Mira Ivanova Georgieva (w)
- March 3: African Junior Triathlon Cup #3 in (South Africa) Maselspoort
  - Winners: (South Africa) Nicholas Horne (m) / (South Africa) Anika Visser (w)
- March 23: African Junior Triathlon Cup #4 in (Namibia) Swakopmund
- April 6: African Junior Triathlon Cup #5 in (South Africa) Nelson Mandela Bay Metropolitan Municipality
- May 3 & 4: African Junior Triathlon Cup #6 in (Tunisia) Hammamet
- September 8: African Junior Triathlon Cup #7 in (Tunisia) Monastir
- October 20: African Junior Triathlon Cup #8 in (Tunisia) La Perle de Lac Tunis

=== Americas Junior Triathlon Cups ===
- February 16-18: Americas Junior Triathlon Cup in (Venezuela) La Guaira
  - Winners: (Venezuela) Dixon Hernandez (m) / (Venezuela) Yaniuska Jiménez (w)

=== Asia Junior Triathlon Cups ===
- July 13 & 14: Asia Junior Triathlon Cup in (Malaysia) Kampar

=== Europe Junior Triathlon Cups ===
- March 23: Europe Junior Triathlon Cup #1 in (Portugal) Quarteira
- April 14: Europe Junior Triathlon Cup #2 in (Spain) Melilla
- April 20: Europe Junior Triathlon Cup #3 in (Turkey) Yenişehir
- May 11: Europe Junior Triathlon Cup #4 in (Italy) Caorle
- May 25: Europe Junior Triathlon Cup #5 in (Poland) Olsztyn
- June 1 & 2: Europe Junior Triathlon Cup #6 in (Serbia) Silver Lake
- June 15 & 16: Europe Junior Triathlon Cup #7 in (Romania) Izvorani
- June 23: Europe Junior Triathlon Cup #8 in (Austria) Wels
- June 29: Europe Junior Triathlon Cup #9 in (Netherlands) Holten
- July 6 & 7: Europe Junior Triathlon Cup #10 in (Hungary) Tiszaújváros
- July 13: Europe Junior Triathlon Cup #11 in (Republic of Ireland) Cork
- July 20 & 21: Europe Junior Triathlon Cup #12 in (Moldova) Chișinău
- July 28: Europe Junior Triathlon Cup #13 in (Czech Republic) Tábor
- August 24: Europe Junior Triathlon Cup #14 in (Latvia) Riga
- September 7: Europe Junior Triathlon Cup #15 in (Slovenia) Bled
- September 15: Europe Junior Triathlon Cup #16 in (Croatia) Zagreb
- September 28 & 29: Europe Junior Triathlon Cup #17 in (Malta) Is-Salina

== Development Regional Cups ==
- March 16 & 17: DRC #1 in (Uruguay) Mercedes
- April 6 & 7: DRC #2 in (Bolivia) Cochabamba
- April 21: DRC #3 in Puerto Rico
- May 11: DRC #4 in (Algeria) Algiers
- May 25 & 26: DRC #5 in (Guatemala) Amatique Bay
- July 7: DRC #6 in (Barbados) Bridgetown
- July 28: DRC #7 in (Dominican Republic) Santo Domingo
- August 3: DRC #8 in (Kenya) Kilifi
- August 11: DRC #9 in (Paraguay) Asunción
- September 15: DRC #10 in (Trinidad and Tobago) Bucco Bay
- October 20: DRC #11 in (Costa Rica) Limón
- November 10: DRC #12 in (Senegal) Saly

== T100 Triathlon World Tour ==
- March 9: WT #1 in (United States) Miami
  - Winners: (Denmark) Magnus Ditlev (m) / (United Kingdom) India Lee (w)
- April 13 & 14: WT #2 in Singapore
  - Winners: (Netherlands) Youri Keulen (m) / (Australia) Ashleigh Gentle (w)
- June 8 & 9: WT #3 in (United States) San Francisco
- July 27 & 28: WT #4 in (United Kingdom) London
- September 28 & 29: WT #5 in (Spain) Ibiza
- October 19 & 20: WT #6 in (United States) Lake Las Vegas
- November 16 & 17: WT #7 in (United Arab Emirates) Dubai
- November 29 & 30: WT Finals in TBD

== World Indoor Cup ==
- March 30: World Triathlon Indoor Cup in (France) Liévin

== Olympic Qualification Event ==
- May 19: 2024 World Triathlon Mixed Relay Olympic Qualification Event in (Mexico) Huatulco

== Winter triathlon ==
- February 3: World Triathlon Winter Cup in (China) Harbin
  - Winners: (Italy) Alessandro Saravalle (m) / (China) Yula Danzeng (w)
- February 23 & 24: 2024 World Triathlon Winter Duathlon Championships in (Italy) Pragelato
  - Winners: (Norway) Hans Christian Tungesvik (m) / (Norway) Ine Skjellum (w)
- February 24 & 25: 2024 World Triathlon Winter Championships in (Italy) Pragelato
  - Winners: (Italy) Franco Pesavento (m) / (Italy) Sandra Mairhofer (w)
