= T100 Triathlon =

Series of triathlon events

T100 Triathlon (also known as the T100 Triathlon World Tour) is a series of professional and amateur triathlon races operated by the Professional Triathletes Organisation (PTO). The T100 triathlon distance consists of a 2km swim, an 80km bike ride, and an 18km run, totaling 100km.

The first year of the T100 Triathlon World Tour series, the successor to the PTO Tour, was launched on 30 January 2024 and featured 7 events with a points-based system to award the T100 Triathlon World Championship, a title recognised by World Triathlon, the sport's international governing body, as the official world championship for non-drafting long-distance triathlon.

The T100 Triathlon series is unique in contracting its athletes to take part, giving long-distance professional triathletes a guaranteed regular income from a race organiser for the first time in the sport's history. This approach was designed to create a 'season-long narrative' that would increase mainstream engagement in professional triathlon.

== Amateur T100 events ==
In addition to the professional T100 tour, amateur triathletes (sometimes referred to as 'age-groupers') can also take part in all T100 Triathlon events with the exception of the San Francisco T100, which is run alongside the famous Escape From Alcatraz Triathlon.

== 2024 T100 Triathlon World Tour ==
The 2024 T100 Triathlon World Tour contracted 20 men and women athletes to race in 2024 with more than $7m in athlete compensation.

Of the 20 contracted athletes for 2024, 16 were selected based on their PTO World Rankings with a further four 'Hot Shots' selected based on their pedigree in the sport outside of the PTO World Rankings.

The Hot Shots for 2024 included double-Olympic Champion Alistair Brownlee, Olympic silver medallist Javier Gomez, Olympian Marten Van Riel and 2023 Ironman 70.3 World Champion, Rico Bogen. On the women's side, the Hot Shots were Tokyo Olympic Champion Flora Duffy, Taylor Spivey, Lucy Byram and Amelia Watkinson. Wildcard athletes were also added at each event wherever contacted athletes didn't fill the full field.

=== Contracted women for 2024 ===
Women professionals for the 2024 T100 Triathlon World Tour were:

- Taylor Knibb
- Ashleigh Gentle
- Kat Matthews
- Flora Duffy (Hot Shot)
- Lucy Byram (Hot Shot)
- Laura Philipp
- India Lee
- Imogen Simmonds
- Paula Findlay
- Taylor Spivey (Hot Shot)
- Lucy Charles-Barclay
- Anne Haug
- Kaidi Kivioja
- Tamara Jewett
- Emma Pallant-Browne
- Amelia Watkinson (Hot Shot)
- Holly Lawrence
- Marjolain Pierré
- Daniela Ryf
- Chelsea Sodaro
- Skye Moench

=== Contracted men for 2024 ===
Male professionals for the 2024 T100 Triathlon World Tour were:

- Marten Van Riel (Hot Shot)
- Rico Bogen (Hot Shot)
- Magnus Ditlev
- Alistair Brownlee (Hot Shot)
- Sam Long
- Mathis Margirier
- Pieter Heemeryck
- Frederic Funk
- Sam Laidlow
- Jason West
- Daniel Baekkegard
- Aaron Royle
- David McNamee
- Rudy von Berg
- Leon Chevalier
- Clement Mignon
- Ben Kanute
- Max Neumann
- Javier Gomez (Hot Shot)

=== T100 Triathlon World Tour points system for 2024 ===
A simple points system was created for the 2024 T100 season with athletes scoring points based on their finishing positions in each race, with additional weighting of points for the T100 Triathlon World Championship Final. Athletes' best three scores plus their World Championship Final score.

Position	T100 Points	T100 Triathlon World Championship Final
1	35	55
2	28	45
3	25	40
4	22	35
5	20	30
6	18	27
7	16	24
8	14	21
9	12	18
10	11	16
11	10	14
12	9	12
13	8	11
14	7	10
15	6	9
16	5	8
17	4	7
18	3	6
19	2	5
20	1	4

=== 2024 prize money ===
The $7m in athlete compensation for the first year of the T100 Triathlon World Tour was made up of contractual payments (which were not made public), prize money at each T100 Triathlon event and an end-of-series prize pool allocated based on final series position.

Series Races	$250,000	T100 Series End	$2,000,000
1	$25,000	1	$210,000
2	$16,000	2	$140,000
3	$12,000	3	$90,000
4	$9,000	4	$75,000
5	$8,000	5	$60,000
6	$7,000	6	$55,000
7	$6,500	7	$50,000
8	$6,000	8	$45,000
9	$5,500	9	$40,000
10	$5,000	10	$35,000
11	$2,500	11	$30,000
12	$2,500	12	$26,000
13	$2,500	13	$24,000
14	$2,500	14	$22,000
15	$2,500	15	$20,000
16	$2,500	16	$18,000
17	$2,500	17	$15,000
18	$2,500	18	$15,000
19	$2,500	19	$15,000
20	$2,500	20	$15,000

=== 2024 T100 Triathlon World Tour events ===
There were 7 events in the 2024 T100 Triathlon: Miami T100 on 9 March; Singapore T100 on 13–14 April; San Francisco T100 on 8 June (held at the famous Escape From Alcatraz triathlon); the London T100 on 27–28 July; the Ibiza T100 on 28 September; the Lake Las Vegas T100 on 19 October; and the Dubai T100 Triathlon World Championship Final on 16–17 November.

=== 2024 T100 results ===
Following the Dubai T100 World Championship Final, the USA's Taylor Knibb and Belgium's Marten Van Riel were crowned the first-ever T100 Triathlon World Champions, earning an extra $210,000 each.

Event	1st Woman	2nd Woman	3rd Woman
Miami T100	(United Kingdom) India Lee	(United Kingdom) Lucy Charles-Barclay	(United Kingdom) Holly Lawrence
Singapore T100	(Australia) Ashleigh Gentle	(United Kingdom) Lucy Charles-Barclay	(Netherlands) Els Visser
San Francisco T100	(United States) Taylor Knibb	(United Kingdom) Kat Matthews	(Germany) Laura Philipp
London T100	(Australia) Ashleigh Gentle	(Switzerland) Imogen Simmonds	(United Kingdom) Kat Matthews
Ibiza T100	(United States) Taylor Knibb	(Switzerland) Julie Derron	(United Kingdom) India Lee
Lake Las Vegas T100	(United States) Taylor Knibb	(Switzerland) Julie Derron	(Bermuda) Flora Duffy
Dubai T100 Triathlon World Championship Final	(United States) Taylor Knibb	(Switzerland) Julie Derron	(Australia) Ashleigh Gentle

Event	1st Man	2nd Man	3rd Man
Miami T100	(Denmark) Magnus Ditlev	(United States) Sam Long	(France) Mathis Margirier
Singapore T100	(Netherlands) Youri Keulen	(United States) Sam Long	(Belgium) Pieter Heemeryck
San Francisco T100	(Belgium) Marten Van Riel	(New Zealand) Kyle Smith	(Germany) Rico Bogen
London T100	(France) Sam Laidlow	(New Zealand) Kyle Smith	(Denmark) Daniel Baekkegard
Ibiza T100	(Belgium) Marten Van Riel	(France) Sam Laidlow	(Germany) Mika Noodt
Lake Las Vegas T100	(Belgium) Jelle Geens	(Belgium) Marten Van Riel	(Germany) Justus Nieschlag
Dubai T100 Triathlon World Championship Final	(Belgium) Marten Van Riel	(Germany) Rico Bogen	(United Kingdom) Alistair Brownlee

== 2025 T100 Triathlon World Tour ==
Like in 2024, the 2025 T100 Triathlon World Tour contracted 20 men and women athletes to race in 2024 with more than $8m in athlete compensation.

Of the 20 contracted athletes for 2025, eight were selected based on coming within the top 10 of the T100 Triathlon standings for 2024. All top-10 athletes were offered a contract, however, of the men, Sam Laidlow and Alistair Brownlee (who had retired) turned them down, meanwhile Kat Matthews and Laura Philipp turned them down.

An additional eight athletes were selected via the PTO World Rankings as of 31 December 2024. A further four 'Hot Shots' were also added based on their pedigree in the sport outside of the PTO World Rankings.

The male Hot Shots for 2025 are Olympic silver and bronze medallist Hayden Wilde, Olympic bronze medallist Léo Bergère, double World Triathlon Champion Vincent Luis and double Olympic mixed-relay medallist, Morgan Pearson. For the women, the Hot Shots are Olympians Taylor Spivey, Jessica Learmonth (both mixed-relay Olympic medallists) and Kate Waugh, plus up-and-coming middle-distance triathlete Laura Madsen.

As in 2024, Wildcards will be added to races when there are slots available.

=== Contracted women for 2025 ===
Women professionals for the 2025 T100 Triathlon World Tour:

- Taylor Knibb
- Ashleigh Gentle
- Julie Derron
- Flora Duffy
- Lucy Byram
- India Lee
- Imogen Simmonds
- Paula Findlay
- Lucy Charles-Barclay
- Emma Pallant-Browne
- Els Visser
- Kaidi Kivioja
- Grace Thek
- Marta Sanchez
- Ellie Salthouse
- Caroline Pohle
- Hannah Berry
- Taylor Spivey (Hot Shot)
- Jessica Learmonth (Hot Shot)
- Kate Waugh (Hot Shot)
- Laura Madsen (Hot Shot)

=== Contracted men for 2025 ===
Men professionals for the 2025 T100 Triathlon World Tour:

- Marten Van Riel
- Kyle Smith
- Rico Bogen
- Sam Long
- Mathis Margirier
- Pieter Heemeryck
- Youri Keulen
- Frederic Funk
- Mika Noodt
- Justus Nieschlag
- Jelle Geens
- Menno Koolhaas
- Nicolas Mann
- Antonio Benito-Lopez
- Gregory Barnaby
- Hayden Wilde (Hot Shot)
- Leo Bergere (Hot Shot)
- Vincent Luis (Hot Shot)
- Morgan Pearson (Hot Shot)

=== 2025 T100 Triathlon World Tour events ===
There are 9 events in the 2025 T100 Triathlon World Tour: Singapore T100 on 5–6 April; San Francisco T100 on 31 May; Vancouver T100 on 14 June; London T100 on 9 August; French Riviera T100 on 30-31 August; Valencia T100 on 20 September; Wollongong T100 on 18 October; Dubai T100 on 15 November, and the final in Qatar on 12 December. In August 2025, the PTO announced that the Valencia T100 would be relocated to Oropesa del Mar.

=== 2025 T100 results ===
Event	1st Woman	2nd Woman	3rd Woman
Singapore T100	(United Kingdom) Kate Waugh	(Austria) Lisa Perterer	(United Kingdom) Lucy Charles-Barclay
San Francisco T100	(Switzerland) Julie Derron	(United States) Taylor Knibb	(United Kingdom) Kate Waugh
Vancouver T100	(United States) Taylor Knibb	(Switzerland) Julie Derron	(United Kingdom) Jessica Learmonth
London T100	(United Kingdom) Lucy Charles-Barclay	(United Kingdom) Kate Waugh	(United States) Taylor Knibb
French Riviera T100	(Australia) Ashleigh Gentle	(Canada) Paula Findlay	(United Kingdom) India Lee
Spain T100	(United Kingdom) Lucy Charles-Barclay	(United Kingdom) Kate Waugh	(United Kingdom) Jessica Learmonth
Wollongong T100	(United Kingdom) Kate Waugh	(Australia) Ashleigh Gentle	(Spain) Sara Pérez Sala
Dubai T100	(Switzerland) Julie Derron	(United Kingdom) Kate Waugh	(United Kingdom) Jessica Learmonth
Qatar T100 Triathlon World Championship Final	(United Kingdom) Kate Waugh	(United Kingdom) Georgia Taylor-Brown	(Switzerland) Julie Derron

Event	1st Man	2nd Man	3rd Man
Singapore T100	(New Zealand) Hayden Wilde	(France) Léo Bergère	(Belgium) Marten Van Riel
San Francisco T100	(Germany) Rico Bogen	(Belgium) Jelle Geens	(Germany) Mika Noodt
Vancouver T100	(Belgium) Jelle Geens	(Belgium) Marten Van Riel	(Germany) Mika Noodt
London T100	(New Zealand) Hayden Wilde	(Germany) Mika Noodt	(Belgium) Jelle Geens
French Riviera T100	(New Zealand) Hayden Wilde	(Belgium) Jelle Geens	(United Kingdom) Samuel Dickinson
Spain T100	(New Zealand) Hayden Wilde	(Belgium) Jelle Geens	(Germany) Jonas Schomburg
Wollongong T100	(New Zealand) Hayden Wilde	(Germany) Mika Noodt	(Netherlands) Youri Keulen
Dubai T100	(United States) Morgan Pearson	(Germany) Mika Noodt	(Italy) Gregory Barnaby
Qatar T100 Triathlon World Championship Final	(New Zealand) Hayden Wilde	(United States) Morgan Pearson	(Belgium) Marten Van Riel

== 2026 T100 Triathlon World Tour ==
In October, the PTO announced several changes to the format of the T100 World Tour for 2026. There will be no more season-long contracts. Instead, athletes will be invited on a event-by-event basis. Except for the championship final in Qatar, events will no longer feature both a women’s and a men’s race each, but rather either a women’s or a men’s race only.

=== 2026 T100 Triathlon World Tour events ===
There will be 9 pro events in the 2026 T100 Triathlon World Tour, 4 women’s only pro races (T100 Gold Coast, 21–22 March; T100 Spain, 23–24 May; T100 Vancouver, 15–16 August; and T100 Dubai, 12–15 November), 4 men’s only pro races (T100 Singapore, 25–26 April; T100 San Francisco, 6–7 June; T100 French Riviera, 19–20 September; T100 Saudi Arabia, November (TBC)), and the Qatar T100 Triathlon World Championship Final on 11–12 December featuring both a men’s and a women’s pro race.
