= Ironman 70.3 World Championship =

Long-distance triathlon competition

The Ironman 70.3 World Championship is a long-distance triathlon competition held annually and organized by the World Triathlon Corporation (WTC).

== History ==
The "70.3" refers to the total distance in miles (113.0 km) covered in the race, consisting of a 1.2-mile (1.9 km) swim, a 56-mile (90 km) bike ride, and a 13.1-mile (21.1 km) run. Each distance of the swim, bike, and run segments is half the distance of that segment in an Ironman Triathlon. The Ironman 70.3 series culminates each year with a World Championship competition, for which competitors qualify during the 70.3 series in the 12 months prior to the championship race. In addition to the World Championship race, Ironman 70.3 championship competitions are also held for the European, Asia-Pacific, and Latin America regions.

The time needed by an athlete to complete a 70.3 distance event varies from race to race and can be influenced by external factors. These factors include the terrain and the total elevation gained and lost on the course, weather conditions, and course conditions. Finish times range from sub-four-hour completion times by elite-level athletes to the imposed race cutoff, which is commonly 8 hours and 30 minutes after the start time.

From its first year as a championship race series in 2006 until 2010, the Ironman 70.3 World Championships were held in Clearwater, Florida, USA, during the month of November. In 2011, the 70.3 Championship venue changed to Las Vegas, and the date of the event moved up in the calendar to September. Lake Las Vegas is the site of the event's swim. For 2014 and all following years the location for the 70.3 Championship will change each year.

== Qualification ==
Qualification into the Ironman 70.3 World Championship can be obtained through the Ironman 70.3 series of events held during the 12-month qualification period prior to the championship. Some Ironman 70.3 events also act as qualifiers for the full Ironman World Championship in Hawaii, USA. Professional triathletes qualify for the championship race by competing in races during the qualifying period, earning points towards their pro rankings. An athlete's five highest-scoring races are counted toward their pro rankings. The top 50 males and the top 35 females in the pro rankings qualify for the championship race.

Amateur triathletes can qualify for the championship race by earning a qualifying slot at one of the qualifying events. At qualifying events, slots are allocated to each age group category, male and female, with the number of slots given out based on that category's proportional representation of the overall field. Each age group category is tentatively allocated one qualifying spot in each qualifying event.

== Location ==
Year	Location
2006–2010	Clearwater, Florida, USA
2011–2013	Henderson, Nevada, USA
2014	Mont-Tremblant, Quebec, Canada
2015	Zell am See-Kaprun, Austria
2016	Mooloolaba, Queensland, Australia
2017	Chattanooga, Tennessee, USA
2018	Nelson Mandela Bay, South Africa
2019	Nice, Alpes-Maritimes, France
~~2020~~	Taupō, New Zealand * Event did not run due to COVID-19 restrictions
2021	St. George, Utah, USA
2022	St. George, Utah, USA
2023	Lahti, Finland
2024	Taupō, New Zealand
2025	Marbella, Málaga, Spain
2026	Nice, Alpes-Maritimes, France

== Men's championship ==
Year	Gold	Silver	Bronze
2006	Craig Alexander (AUS)	Simon Lessing (GBR)	Richie Cunningham (AUS)
2007	Andy Potts (USA)	Oscar Galíndez (ARG)	Andrew Johns (GBR)
2008	Terenzo Bozzone (NZL)	Andreas Raelert (GER)	Richie Cunningham (AUS)
2009	Michael Raelert (GER)	Daniel Fontana (ITA)	Matthew Reed (USA)
2010	Michael Raelert (GER)	Filip Ospalý (CZE)	Timothy O'Donnell (USA)
2011	Craig Alexander (AUS)	Chris Lieto (USA)	Jeff Symonds (CAN)
2012	Sebastian Kienle (GER)	Craig Alexander (AUS)	Bevan Docherty (NZL)
2013	Sebastian Kienle (GER)	Terenzo Bozzone (NZL)	Joe Gambles (AUS)
2014	Javier Gómez (ESP)	Jan Frodeno (GER)	Tim Don (GBR)
2015	Jan Frodeno (GER)	Sebastian Kienle (GER)	Javier Gómez (ESP)
2016	Timothy Reed (AUS)	Sebastian Kienle (GER)	Ruedi Wild (SUI)
2017	Javier Gómez (ESP)	Ben Kanute (USA)	Tim Don (GBR)
2018	Jan Frodeno (GER)	Alistair Brownlee (GBR)	Javier Gómez (ESP)
2019	Gustav Iden (NOR)	Alistair Brownlee (GBR)	Rodolphe Von Berg (USA)
2021	Gustav Iden (NOR)	Sam Long (USA)	Daniel Baekkegard (DNK)
2022	Kristian Blummenfelt (NOR)	Ben Kanute (USA)	Magnus Ditlev (DEN)
2023	Rico Bogen (GER)	Frederic Funk (GER)	Jan Stratmann (GER)
2024	Jelle Geens (BEL)	Hayden Wilde (NZL)	Léo Bergère (FRA)
2025	Jelle Geens (BEL)	Kristian Blummenfelt (NOR)	Casper Stornes (NOR)
2026	Hayden Wilde (NZL)	Kristian Blummenfelt (NOR)	Jelle Geens (BEL)

Winners by country

- 7: Germany
- 3: Australia
- 3: Norway
- 2: Belgium
- 2: New Zealand
- 2: Spain
- 1: United States

== Women's championship ==
Year	Gold	Silver	Bronze
2006	Samantha McGlone (CAN)	Lisa Bentley (CAN)	Mirinda Carfrae (AUS)
2007	Mirinda Carfrae (AUS)	Samantha McGlone (CAN)	Leanda Cave (GBR)
2008	Joanna Zeiger (USA)	Mary Beth Ellis (USA)	Becky Lavelle (USA)
2009	Julie Dibens (GBR)	Mary Beth Ellis (USA)	Magali Tisseyre (CAN)
2010	Jodie Swallow (GBR)	Leanda Cave (GBR)	Magali Tisseyre (CAN)
2011	Melissa Rollison (AUS)	Karin Thürig (SUI)	Linsey Corbin (USA)
2012	Leanda Cave (GBR)	Kelly Williamson (USA)	Heather Jackson (USA)
2013	Melissa Hauschildt (AUS)	Heather Jackson (USA)	Annabel Luxford (AUS)
2014	Daniela Ryf (SUI)	Jodie Swallow (GBR)	Heather Wurtele (CAN)
2015	Daniela Ryf (SUI)	Heather Wurtele (CAN)	Anja Beranek (GER)
2016	Holly Lawrence (GBR)	Melissa Hauschildt (AUS)	Heather Wurtele (CAN)
2017	Daniela Ryf (SUI)	Emma Pallant (GBR)	Laura Philipp (GER)
2018	Daniela Ryf (SUI)	Lucy Charles (GBR)	Anne Haug (GER)
2019	Daniela Ryf (SUI)	Holly Lawrence (GBR)	Imogen Simmonds (SUI)
2021	Lucy Charles (GBR)	Jeanni Metzler (SA)	Taylor Knibb (USA)
2022	Taylor Knibb (USA)	Paula Findlay (CAN)	Emma Pallant-Browne (GBR)
2023	Taylor Knibb (USA)	Katrina Matthews (GBR)	Imogen Simmonds (SUI)
2024	Taylor Knibb (USA)	Katrina Matthews (GBR)	Ashleigh Gentle (AUS)
2025	Lucy Charles-Barclay (GBR)	Taylor Knibb (USA)	Tanja Neubert (GER)
2026	Taylor Knibb (USA)	Julie Derron (SUI)	Alanis Siffert (SUI)

Winners by country

- 6: United Kingdom
- 5: Switzerland
- 5: United States
- 3: Australia
- 1: Canada
