= Youri Keulen =

Dutch triathlete

Personal information
- Born: 1998 (age 27–28) Maastricht, Netherlands
- Height: 1.76 m (5 ft 9 in)
- Weight: 66 kg (146 lb)

Sport
- Country: Netherlands
- Sport: Triathlon
- Coached by: Kosta Poltavets; Carlos Prieto; Kai Reus

Youri Keulen (born 1998) is a Dutch triathlete.

== Biography ==
Keulen was born in Maastricht, Netherlands, in 1998, as part of a triplet. He competed as a middle-distance runner before transitioning to triathlon. He was a three-time Dutch national age-group champion over 800 metres as a teenager. After leaving the Dutch federation who focussed more on the Olympic distance triathlon, Keulen based himself in Girona, Spain, and developed a coaching team made up of Kosta Poltavets, Carlos Prieto and former professional cyclist Kai Reus.

Keulen finished first at the Ironman 70.3 Mallorca in May 2022 but was later disqualified from the official results after confusion over a penalty. He subsequently won the Ironman 70.3 Switzerland on June 19, 2022.

Keulen placed sixth overall at the 2023 IRONMAN 70.3 World Championships in Lahti. Shortly afterwards, he defeated a world class field including Alastair Brownlee, at the inaugural Challenge Barcelona event in Spain, which had a 1.5km swim, 60km bike and 15km run.

In 2024, competing as a wildcard, he placed fourth at T100 Miami. Keulen won his first T100 Triathlon event in Singapore in April 2024, competing as a wildcard athlete. However, such was his exhaustion at the finish in extreme conditions he was unable to make the podium, and was temporarily hospitalised. Still feeling the effects of Singapore he was unable to finish the IRONMAN 70.3 Mallorca three weeks later and then finished 14th at IRONMAN 70.3 Switzerland. He placed eleventh at the T100 Grand Final in Dubai in mid-November 2024, a finish which saw him end the season in ninth place in the overall standings. However, he was ruled out of the 2024 IRONMAN 70.3 World Championships due to illness.

In October 2025, he placed third at the T100 Series event in Wollongong, Australia, finishing behind Hayden Wilde of New Zealand and runner-up Mika Noodt of Germany.
