= Professional Triathletes Organisation =

Organisation representing non-drafting professional triathletes

The Professional Triathletes Organisation (PTO) is a commercial London-based organisation that represents non-drafting professional triathletes. Its mission is to professionalise and promote the sport of triathlon through its T100 Triathlon World Tour racing series.

The PTO is a hybrid of a not-for-profit organisation and commercial endeavour. The commercial enterprises of the PTO – including PTO events – are operated under a commercial entity, with the triathletes of PTO retaining 50% ownership and PTO investors retaining 50% ownership.

In 2023 the PTO signed an agreement with the governing body of the sport, World Triathlon, under which PTO will organise a World Championship Tour of Long Distance Triathlon, a series which World Triathlon will, from 2024, recognise as its 'official' world championship for non-drafting long distance triathlon, mirroring its own Olympic-distance World Triathlon Championship Series. The relationship has been described as analogous with that between the FIA and Formula One.

== History ==
Originally named the Professional Triathletes Union (PTU), the organisation was first mooted by a group of athletes at the Challenge Bahrain event in 2014. The founding board included Ironman World Championship winners Mirinda Carfrae, Sebastian Kienle and Pete Jacobs with the full list also including Jodie Swallow, Rachel Joyce, Helle Frederiksen, Meredith Kessler, Mary Beth Ellis, Angela Naeth, Dirk Bockel, Dylan McNiece, Timothy O’Donnell, James Cunnama, Andreas Dreitz and Scott DeFilippis. The PTU was launched to the world on 29 July 2015 with former Pro triathlete Rich Allen as the Executive Director.

With athletes being spread around the world and in the midst of their professional triathlon careers, development was slow, but a key group were committed to the cause, with Rachel Joyce, Scott DeFilippis, Mirinda Carfrae, Meredith Kessler, Dylan McNiece, Tim O’Donnell and Sarah Piampiano continuing to work on the PTU behind the scenes.

=== PTU becomes PTO ===
The organisation was boosted with the help of Charles Adamo, who came aboard in 2016 as CEO after drafting a memo to PTU president Tim O'Donnell. Encouraging the group to drop the 'Union' titling due to its connotations as being "one big grievance committee", the Professional Triathletes Union became the Professional Triathletes Organisation in 2016 with Adamo's task being to make the organisation an economic reality.

The PTO has repeatedly referenced the professionalisation of other sports including tennis and golf, with which triathlon shares a similar ABC1 high-end audience demographic. Indeed, golf's iconic Ryder Cup event provided the inspiration for the PTO's flagship Collins Cup event, which was announced in September 2016 and originally set to take place at Challenge Roth in 2018 (and subsequently delayed until 2021 due to the COVID-19 pandemic). Named after John and Judy Collins, founders of Ironman, the event would see teams from Europe, USA and International regions battle it out over 12 match races.

Meanwhile, Adamo continued to seek out investment, the search made more difficult by him setting his sights on investors who would in Rachel Joyce's words: "see the athletes as partners as opposed to pawns." The PTO brought in the expertise of independent investment bank North Point Advisors to aid in structuring the PTO's business model, financial planning and raising capital for the organisation.

=== New leadership and investment ===
In September 2019, Adamo brought in Sam Renouf as CEO with Adamo himself moving to the position of PTO Chairman. Renouf, a former British elite triathlete, former CEO of MOTIV Group and former part of ACTIVE Network's executive leadership team was tasked with leading the PTO's commercial endeavours. Along with the appointment of Renouf as CEO, the PTO also announced its intention to purchase Ironman in a publicly shared letter dated 20 September 2019 sent to Wanda Sports Group, the brand's then owners, a proposal which Ironman rebuffed in October 2019. In the same month, the PTO appointed Challenge Family CEO Zibi Szlufcik and Jennifer Nimmo of North Point Advisors to the PTO Board of Directors.

In January 2020, the PTO announced it had secured funding from Michael Moritz's Crankstart Investments, a sympathetic partner aligned with the organisation's goals. Recognised on multiple occasions by Forbes Magazine as the number one venture capitalist on its Midas List, Moritz has served on the Boards of Google, PayPal, Linkedin and Yahoo! amongst many others. According to Triathlon Magazine Canada, Moritz and his team were won over by a picture of four-time Ironman World Champion Chrissie Wellington's legs.

In 2020, following the news of this investment funding, the PTO announced that the first Collins Cup would feature a $2,000,000 prize purse (the largest in the sport's history) that would take place at x-bionic sphere in Šamorín, Slovakia in May 2020, a date that would be forced into 2021 due to the COVID-19 pandemic.

Also in January 2020, the PTO announced the appointment of double-Olympic Gold Medallist Alistair Brownlee to the PTO Athlete Board. The following month, the PTO renewed its interest in acquiring Ironman, however as previously, Ironman was averse to selling to the PTO.

On 20 February 2020, the PTO launched its $2,000,000 Annual Bonus Programme, a pool of money to be paid to the top-100 athletes in the PTO World Rankings at the end of the year. The purse would offer $100,000 for the #1 ranked athlete (male and female), through to $5,000 for every athlete ranked 21-50 and $2,000 for every athlete ranked between 51 and 100.

=== More key appointments ===
The PTO continued to gather expertise to its ranks throughout 2020 and 2021. Once such key appointment was bringing aboard Chris Kermode, former Executive Chairman and President of the ATP, who joined the PTO as Vice Chairman in July 2020.

Meanwhile, Tim Godfrey joined as Chief Marketing Officer in January 2021, bringing more experience from other sports to the PTO, in this case Formula E and SailGP. Another key appointment in January 2021 was confirming Martin Turner – former head of Formula 1 coverage for Sky Sports – as executive producer for the first Collins Cup event. Following the success of that event, Turner subsequently became the PTO's Head of Broadcast in October 2021.

=== Covid-19 pandemic ===
With the COVID-19 pandemic resulting in a slew of cancelled races, impacting the ability of professional triathletes to make money, the PTO increased its Annual Bonus Programme to $2,500,000 and paid it out early in March 2020 with the additional funds going to athletes ranked 21 to 100.

In April, the PTO announced a $1,000,000 prize purse for the PTO 2020 Championship, which would take place in December 2020 at the Daytona International Speedway in Daytona Beach, FL. Later in the year, that figure would rise to $1,150,000 to ensure no athlete would go away empty handed regardless of finishing position in the race.

Throughout the 2020 triathlon season, the PTO provided additional prize money to events around the world so that athletes locked down in their home countries would still have the chance to race and make money. The figure totalled over $220,000 with events in the UK, USA, Canada, France, Spain, Germany, Australia and South Africa benefiting from the funds. The PTO also paid out money even when an event was cancelled.

As COVID-19 continued in 2021, the PTO supported more races across the globe with more than $100,000 in additional prize money.

== Maternity leave policy ==
In November 2020, the PTO launched its Maternity Leave programme, entitling professional women to take up to 15 months off while retaining an income through pregnancy and up to six months after the baby has arrived. The programme also freezes each athletes' place in the PTO World Rankings so that they can return to racing in the position they left.

Money earned by athletes during maternity leave is based on their frozen position in the PTO World Rankings and what this position equates to in relation to the PTO's Annual Bonus Programme plus additional funds to help offset the lost revenue from prize money at races during pregnancy. For example, the PTO World #5 athlete would earn $60,000 from the Annual Bonus Programme, equalling $5,000 per month. Because maternity leave is up to 15 months, the total for taking the full 15 months off would be $75,000. In addition, the athlete also earns a portion of their Annual Bonus Programme amount at the point they begin maternity leave. So if PTO World #5 athlete begins maternity leave on 1 April, she would be eligible for a $15,000 bonus.

Men and women becoming parents through other means, such as adoption, were also included in the policy with a freezing of parents' PTO rankings for up to four months.

== PTO World Rankings ==
The PTO World Ranking System awards points based on athlete finishing times at eligible professional races. To be eligible, races must be longer than Olympic distance (1.5 km swim, 40 km bike and 10 km run) and have a professional prize purse of at least $10,000.

Until 2023, the points were calculated based on proprietary analysis of historical data developed by and exclusively licensed from TriRating.com, taking into account the course and race conditions. Before a race, an event was given an Estimated Ideal Time (EIT), the time in which the world #1 triathlete would be predicted to finish. Following the event, course conditions were analysed resulting in a final Adjusted Ideal Time (AIT). If an athlete equaled the AIT, they would earn 100 points. If they went faster or slower than the AIT, they would earn – or were deducted – one point per 0.15% by which their time differed from the AIT. Each athlete's PTO World Rankings score was based on the average of their top-three results.

After consultation with the PTO Athlete Board, the PTO World Ranking System was overhauled for 2023. The new system did away with the theoretical best times used by the older system and instead focused on three factors to calculate athletes' scores: race position score; strength of field score; and race time score. Races receive a tier (Diamond, Platinum, Gold, Silver, Bronze) based on the prize money on offer to professional athletes. This could be the one-off prize money for that particular race, or in the case of money spread across a series, such as the T100 Triathlon World Tour, Challenge Family Bonus or Ironman Pro Series, the total prize pot divided by the number of races.

Race Position Score makes up 40% of the overall athlete score. It sets base points and a percentage drop-off for each race tier, the athlete is then awarded points based on their finishing position. Strength Of Field (SOF) score makes up 30% of the overall athlete score. This is calculated as the average PTO World Rankings score of the top 5 athletes who start the race. Race Time Score makes up the final 30% of the overall athlete score. The most complex area of the system, Race Time Score takes the average of Tier Base Points and SOF Score to create a baseline score. A Baseline Time is calculated as the average finishing time of athletes based on the number of race finishers. 6 points are added or deducted from the athlete's score for every 1% that they’re faster or slower than the Baseline Time. The overall athlete's score is calculated as 40% of an athlete’s Race Position Score, 30% of the SOF Score and 30% of an athlete’s Race Time Score.

The current rankings can be viewed at the PTO stats website, which was launched in May 2021.

== PTO broadcasts ==
A large part of the PTO's mission to professionalise triathlon follows the path of other sports such as golf and tennis, for which television broadcast rights bring vital revenue to build a fanbase and re-inject money into the professional sport.

Following broadcast deals secured by IMG, the PTO 2020 Championship in Daytona enjoyed a broadcast in over 100 countries with a claimed reach of over 450 million – equating to a reported media value of US$4.2 million.

Following a partnership with NASCAR Productions at the PTO 2020 Championship, the PTO commissioned FilmNova to produce the global broadcast of its first flagship Collins Cup event in March 2021. Experienced in a wide variety of sporting broadcasts including World Triathlon events in the UK as well as the Olympic Games and World Indoor Athletics Championships, the FilmNova coverage would include 12 motos, helitele, drones, robotics, jibs, steadicams, pole-cams, buoy-cams and handhelds. The Collins Cup broadcast team was headed by Martin Turner, former head of Sky Sports' Formula 1 coverage.

In April 2021, the PTO announced a three-year deal with IMG to assist in distributing global media rights for the Collins Cup. On the back of the partnership, Collins Cup was broadcast around the world in over 165 countries and 22 languages, courting an audience close to 7,000,000 viewers.

On July 13, 2022, the PTO announced a multi-year partnership with Warner Bros. Discovery which would provide exclusive live coverage for PTO Tour events in 50 territories across Europe on its linear channels and through streaming via discovery+, the Eurosport App and GCN+.

On July 19, 2022, the PTO launched its own streaming platform, PTO+, to provide live streaming of PTO Tour events in non-exclusive regions as well as global on-demand coverage. The platform was launched in partnership with Endeavor Streaming, whose other streaming platforms include UFC, NBA and WWE.

In the run-up to the inaugural PTO Canadian Open on 23 July 2022, the PTO announced a number of new broadcast agreements. The deals included a three-year deal with ESPN to broadcast across Central and South America, Mexico and the Caribbean, A two-year deal with DAZN to broadcast in Japan, South Africa, Australia and New Zealand. Other core partners for the PTO include Fox Sports, Fuji TV, IQIYI and Sky Sport.

== PTO Tour triathlon events ==
The PTO runs both professional and age-group (amateur) triathlon events.

=== PTO 2020 Championship ===
The PTO 2020 Championship was held at Challenge Daytona on 7 December 2020. This professional-only race was held under strict Covid-safe measures and featured a record $1,150,000 prize purse with all participating athletes earning money for racing. The women's race was won by Canada's Paula Findlay and the men's race was won by Norway's Gustav Iden

=== Collins Cup ===
Inspired by golf's Ryder Cup, the Collins Cup features three teams of 12 athletes (six men, six women) each from Team Europe; Team US; and Team International. One athlete from each team takes part in one of 12 match races over a 2 km swim, 80 km bike and 18 km run.

Points are awarded for team positions in each match race with bonus points for winning by certain margins. Winning a race earns three points, coming second earns two points while coming third earns one point. Teams earn an extra ½ point for every two minutes they win by – up to 1½ points for a six-minute victory.

Teams are picked with four automatic qualifying spots for women and men, earned by the highest-ranked athletes for each region in the PTO World Rankings, and two additional women's and men's wildcard slots, selected by team captains. The team captains themselves are made up of former professionals who are 'legends' of the sport of triathlon. In the race's first edition, this included Normann Stadler and Natascha Badmann for Team Europe, Mark Allen and Karen Smyers for Team US and Simon Whitfield and Lisa Bentley for Team International.

The inaugural Collins Cup took place on 28 August 2021 at the x-bionic sphere venue in Šamorín, Slovakia and was won by Team Europe, who won six of the 12 match races.

For 2022, the Collins Cup returned to Šamorín and also featured an age-group event as part of the PTO Tour series. Once again, Team Europe were victorious in the event. The Collins Cup has not been held since 2022.

=== PTO Tour Events ===
In December 2021, the PTO announced the PTO Tour, a new series of professional and age-group triathlon events emulating the majors in golf and the masters in tennis. The PTO Tour pro events would begin in 2022 including the PTO Canadian Open (23-24 July), Collins Cup (20-21 August) and PTO US Open (17-18 September). For professionals, each event is held over the 100 km distance (2 km swim, 80 km bike and 18 km run) while amateur athletes can choose from the 100 km distance or a 25 km distance (500m swim, 20 km bike, 4.5 km run).

The 2022 PTO Canadian Open's venue was Edmonton, the capital of Alberta, Canada. The race featured a $1,000,000 professional prize purse and was broadcast in over 200 countries. The podiums for the inaugural event included Ashleigh Gentle, Paula Findlay and Chelsea Sodaro in the women's race and Gustav Iden, Kristian Blummenfelt and Aaron Royle in the men's race.

The 2022 Collins Cup's venue was the x-bionic sphere in Šamorín, Slovakia and featured a $1,500,000 professional prize purse. The PTO US Open's venue was in Irving, near Dallas in Texas and featured a $1,000,000 professional prize purse.

In 2023, the PTO did not hold another Collins Cup event, but expanded its PTO Tour Series to three races, each with a $500,000 prize purse. The PTO European Open, held in Ibiza on 6 May 2023, was won by Anne Haug and Max Neumann. The PTO US Open, held in Milwaukee on 4–5 August 2023 was won by Taylor Knibb and was the final professional victory for Jan Frodeno. The PTO Asian Open, held in Singapore on 19–20 August 2023, was won by Ashleigh Gentle and Kristian Blummenfelt.

== T100 Triathlon World Tour ==
After the 2023 PTO Tour season, the PTO launched the rebranded T100 Triathlon World Tour on 30 January 2024. This new T100 Triathlon series moved away from the golf-style 'PTO Tour' branding and presented a new series of racing with its own simplified points system as well as amateur triathlons at each event. At the end of the series, the athlete with the highest points would be awarded the T100 Triathlon World Championship title. Unlike world titles from Ironman, this is an accolade recognised by World Triathlon, the sport's international governing body, as the official world championship for non-drafting long distance triathlon.

There were 7 events in the 2024 T100 Triathlon: Miami T100 on 9 March; Singapore T100 on 13–14 April; San Francisco T100 on 8 June (held at the famous Escape From Alcatraz triathlon); the London T100 on 27–28 July; the Ibiza T100 on 28 September; the Lake Las Vegas T100 on 19 October; and the Dubai T100 Triathlon World Championship Final on 16–17 November.

The T100 Triathlon World Tour contracted 20 men and women athletes to race in 2024, giving long-distance professional triathletes a guaranteed income from a race organiser for the first time in the sport's history. Of the 20, 16 were selected based on their PTO World Rankings with a further four 'Hot Shots' selected based on their pedigree in the sport outside of the PTO World Rankings. The Hot Shots for 2024 included double-Olympic Champion Alistair Brownlee, Olympic silver medallist Javier Gomez, Olympian Marten Van Riel and 2023 Ironman 70.3 World Champion, Rico Bogen. On the women's side, the Hot Shots were Tokyo Olympic Champion Flora Duffy, Taylor Spivey, Lucy Byram and Amelia Watkinson. Wildcard athletes were also added at each event wherever contacted athletes didn't fill the full field.

In addition to the contractual payments, each race had a prize purse of $250,000 while an end-of-series prize pot of $2m was shared between the top 20 with the T100 Triathlon World Champions – the USA's Taylor Knibb and Belgium's Marten Van Riel earning an extra $210,000 each.

== PTO Champions ==
=== Men ===
Year	Canadian Open	US Open	European Open	Asian Open
2022	(Norway) Gustav Iden (1)	(United States) Collin Chartier (1)	Race not created	Race not created
2023	Race Did Not Occur	(Germany) Jan Frodeno (1)	(Australia) Max Neumann (1)	(Norway) Kristian Blummenfelt (1)

=== Women ===
Year	Canadian Open	US Open	European Open	Asian Open
2022	(Australia) Ashleigh Gentle (1)	(Australia) Ashleigh Gentle (2)	Race not created	Race not created
2023	Race Did Not Occur	(United States) Taylor Knibb (1)	(Germany) Anne Haug (1)	(Australia) Ashleigh Gentle (3)

== Collins Cup results ==
Year	Gold	Silver	Bronze			
2021	Europe (42.5)	U.S. (31.5)	Internationals (25.5)	Šamorín, Slovakia	(Germany) Jan Frodeno (3:13:08)	(United States) Taylor Knibb (3:30:10)
2022	Europe (53)	Internationals (38)	U.S. (22.5)	Bratislava, Slovakia	(Norway) Kristian Blummenfelt (3:09:19)	(Switzerland) Daniela Ryf (3:28:49)

== PTO End of Season Rankings ==
=== Men ===
Year	1st	2nd	3rd	4th	5th
2021	(Norway) Gustav Iden	(Germany) Jan Frodeno	(Canada) Lionel Sanders	(United States) Sam Long	(Germany) Patrick Lange
2022	(Norway) Kristian Blummenfelt	(Norway) Gustav Iden	(Denmark) Magnus Ditlev	(Australia) Max Neumann	(France) Sam Laidlow
2023	(Norway) Kristian Blummenfelt	(Denmark) Magnus Ditlev	(United States) Jason West	(Germany) Jan Frodeno	(Belgium) Pieter Heemeryck

=== Women ===
Year	1st	2nd	3rd	4th	5th
2021	(United Kingdom) Lucy Charles-Barclay	(Switzerland) Daniela Ryf	(Germany) Laura Philipp	(United States) Taylor Knibb	(Germany) Anne Haug
2022	(Germany) Anne Haug	(Switzerland) Daniela Ryf	(Australia) Ashleigh Gentle	(United States) Taylor Knibb	(United Kingdom) Lucy Charles-Barclay
2023	(Germany) Anne Haug	(Australia) Ashleigh Gentle	(United States) Taylor Knibb	(United Kingdom) Lucy Charles-Barclay	(Germany) Laura Philipp
