= Sam Laidlow =

French triathlete

Personal information
- Born: 23 December 1998 (age 27) Oakley, Bedfordshire, England

Sport
- Country: France
- Sport: Triathlon
- Team: AS Monaco Triathlon
- Coached by: Richard Laidlow
Medal record
Representing France
Men's triathlon
Ironman World Championship
Gold medal – first place	2023	Individual
Silver medal – second place	2022	Individual

Sam Laidlow (born December 23, 1998) is a French professional long course triathlete.

Sam won the 2023 Ironman World Championship on 10 September 2023 in Nice, France. He became the first Ironman World Champion from France and the youngest man ever to win the title.

He placed second in the (second) 2022 Ironman World Championships in Kona, Hawaii, breaking the bike course record. He showed promise finishing 8th at his first Ironman World Championships at the age of 23 (the youngest athlete in the professional field). Other results include a 2nd Place Finish at Ironman UK, and a win at the Spanish Irondistance race in the Girona Province (140.6INN)

In 2024 he won the London leg of the T100 Triathlon Series.

== Triathlon career ==
In 2001, his parents decided to move from the UK to the South of France in order to set up a triathlon training business – Sancture Sportifs. At the age of 13 he decided to leave his home in Amélie-les-Bains-Palalda for the National Altitude Training Centre in Font Romeu. 3 years later Sam was selected to train alongside the French team in Montpellier. At the age of 17 he went back home to his family in Amélie-les-Bains-Palalda and started to being coached by his father Richard Laidlow.

He won the Bearman Xtreme Iron distance race in 2017 and the Lakesman in 2019, setting the fastest iron-distance time ever recorded in the United Kingdom. At the Cannes International Triathlon in 2018, he was leading Javier Gómez for most of the race when his rear derailleur broke. He ran 20 km with his bike and completed the race regardless. In 2019, he finished 7th at Ironman Barcelona in a time of 8:05h.

With his strengths being the first two disciplines of triathlon (swimming and cycling), Sam is often known for being at the front of the races assuming a more aggressive racing style. Sam also represented Team Europe at the 2nd edition of The Collins Cup in Samorin.

In 2022, Sam came second behind Gustav Iden in the 2022 Ironman World Championships.

However in 2023, he improved on his silver, winning gold in Nice. Becoming the youngest man to win the world championships ever. He won almost four minutes ahead of Patrick Lange, the second placed finisher that year.

Laidlow announced the launch of an investigation by the International Testing Agency on the 20th of October 2023. The investigation follows doping concerns raised to the ITA by private sources.

In 2024, Sam was one of the twenty contracted athletes set to compete in the PTO new race series the T100 World Tour, after a rocky start, he silenced critics with his first win in London, the fourth leg of the tour.

In late 2024, on the run up to the Ironman World Championships his training base in France suffered a fire, destroying some of his equipment. No one was harmed.

== Personal life ==
Laidlow is of French and British descent and resides in Amélie-les-Bains-Palalda where his family home is.

== Results ==
The table shows the most significant podium results achieved on the national and international triathlon circuit since 2017

Major Results
Year	Competition	Country	Position	Time
2026	Challenge Roth	Germany	1st place, gold medalist(s)	07:21:04
2026	Ironman Lanzarote	Spain	1st place, gold medalist(s)	08:03:40
2026	Ironman 70.3 Valencia	Spain	1st place, gold medalist(s)	03:33:56
2025	Challenge Roth	Germany	1st place, gold medalist(s)	07:29:35
2025	Ironman Leeds	United Kingdom	1st place, gold medalist(s)	08:10:08
2024	T100 – Ibiza	Spain	2nd place, silver medalist(s)	03:12:02
2024	T100 – London	United Kingdom	1st place, gold medalist(s)	03:13:38
2023	2023 Ironman World Championship Nice	France	1st place, gold medalist(s)	08:06:22
2023	Challenge (Triathlon) London	United Kingdom	1st place, gold medalist(s)	03:29:31
2023	Challenge (Triathlon) Gran Canaria	Spain	1st place, gold medalist(s)	03:40:27
2022	2022 Ironman World Championship Kailua-Kona	United States	2nd place, silver medalist(s)	07:42:00
2021	Tradeinn International Triathlon	Spain	1st place, gold medalist(s)	08:36:29
2021	French Long Distance Triathlon Championship	France	2nd place, silver medalist(s)	04:09:04
2021	Ironman UNited-Kingdom	United Kingdom	2nd place, silver medalist(s)	08:51:40
2021	TriGames Cagnes-sur-Mer	France	2nd place, silver medalist(s)	04:09:04
2019	Lakesman Triathlon	United Kingdom	1st place, gold medalist(s)	08:21:00
2017	Bearman Xtreme Triathlon	France	1st place, gold medalist(s)	12:07:08
