= Mika Noodt =

German triathlete

Personal information
- Born: 8 September 2000 (age 25) Wolfsburg, Germany
- Height: 1.87 m (6 ft 2 in)
- Weight: 73 kg (161 lb)

Sport
- Country: Germany
- Sport: Triathlon
- Club: VfL Wolfsburg; DSW Darmstadt
- Coached by: Ben Reszel

Mika Noodt (German pronunciation: [ˈmiːka noːt]; born 8 September 2000) is a German triathlete.

== Athletic career ==
Mika Noodt took up triathlon at the age of 13 at VfL Wolfsburg. Since 2018, he competed for the team of DSW Darmstadt in the Triathlon Bundesliga. In July 2021, he won Ironman 70.3 Les Sables d’Olonne, his first middle-distance race.

In April 2021, at the age of 21, Noodt won Challenge Gran Canaria. At the beginning of May 2022, he announced via his Instagram channel that he had suffered a pelvic injury and would be unable to compete in any competitions until further notice.

In October 2022, Mika Noodt finished fourth at the Ironman 70.3 World Championship in St. George.

In August 2025, he came second at the London T100 and subsequently took the lead in the overall 2025 T100 standings, having previously finished third at both the San Francisco T100 and the Vancouver T100.
