= Kate Waugh =

British triathlete (born 1999)

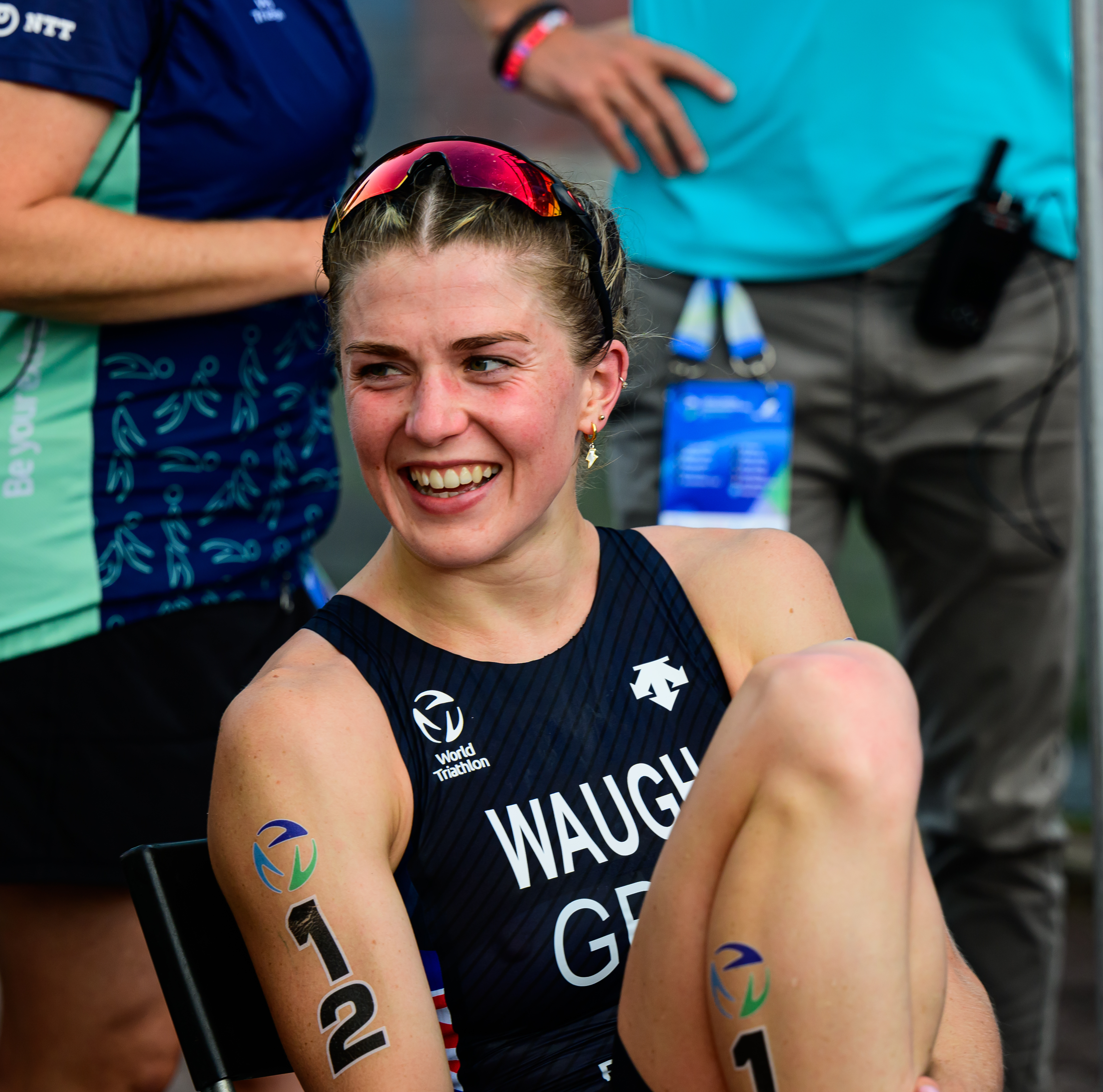
- Kate Waugh places second at the 2023 World Triathlon Championship Grand Final Pontevedra, and places 6th in the world.

Personal information
- Nicknames: Woffy, Ketty
- Born: 13 February 1999 (age 27) Gateshead, England
- Height: 1.72 m (5 ft 8 in)
- Weight: 57 kg (126 lb)

Sport
- Sport: Triathlon
- Coached by: Luca Zenti (2025-) Paulo Sousa (2023-24)
Medal record
Representing Great Britain
Women's triathlon
World Triathlon Championships
| Gold medal – first place | 2022 World Triathlon Championship Series Grand Final | U23 |
| Silver medal – second place | 2023 World Triathlon Championship Series Grand Final | Elite |
T100 Triathlon
| Gold medal – first place | 2025 World Champion | Elite |
| Gold medal – first place | 2025 Singapore | Elite |
| Gold medal – first place | 2025 Wollongong | Elite |
| Gold medal – first place | 2025 Qatar Grand Final | Elite |
| Silver medal – second place | 2025 London | Elite |
| Silver medal – second place | 2025 Spain | Elite |
| Silver medal – second place | 2025 Dubai | Elite |
| Silver medal – second place | 2026 Vancouver | Elite |
| Bronze medal – third place | 2025 San Francisco | Elite |
Super League Triathlon
| Gold medal – first place | 2023 Championship Series Overall | Elite |
| Gold medal – first place | 2023 Championship Series Toulouse | Elite |

Kate Waugh (born 13 February 1999) is a British triathlete competing internationally for Great Britain. She became the 2022 U23 World Champion, having won the 2022 World Triathlon Championship Series event in Abu Dhabi. She is the current T100 Triathlon World Champion, having won the title in 2025. As of January 1, 2026, she is the number one ranked female triathlete in the world according to the Professional Triathlete Organisation world rankings.

In 2023 Waugh built on her success of the previous year with a series of top ten performances, notably in the World Triathlon Championship Series in Yokohama, where she was fifth behind British teammate Sophie Coldwell, before coming second to Beth Potter in the World Triathlon Championship Finals in Pontevedra. Waugh also finished seventh in the Olympic Games Test Event for the 2024 Summer Olympics in Paris, picking up a silver medal in the Mixed Team Relay.

Waugh also competes in Super League Triathlon. She has competed in the Super League Triathlon Arena Games, both in London in 2021 through 2023, and Rotterdam in 2021, as well as the Championship series, where she secured her first win in Toulouse, France in 2023.

In 2025 Waugh was selected as a Hot Shot for the PTO's T100 Triathlon. She won the very first event in Singapore with a record breaking gap to second place.

== Early life ==
Waugh was born in Gateshead, and attended the Royal Grammar School, Newcastle upon Tyne. She took part in her first triathlon "at the age of 8 or 9" after having played sports such as athletics, swimming, field hockey and gymnastics. Waugh has cited the London 2012 Olympics, and the performances of Jessica Ennis-Hill, as inspiration for her goals of competing at the Olympic Games.

Waugh credits her parents for encouraging her to maintain balance between her school work and triathlon events, which saw her win the 2017 European Junior Championships in Kitzbuhel on a Friday having flown into Austria the previous day after completing an A-level exam the previous day.

Waugh studies Psychology at the University of Leeds, although her studies are currently on hold having moved to Monte Gordo, Portugal to focus on her athletic career.

== Career ==
Waugh's first major success came at the age of 15 at the Penza U23 Youth and European Championships Women Relay alongside Olivia Mathias and Sophie Alden. She won the British Triathlon Female Elite Junior Triathlete of the Year award the following year, before coming 2nd and 3rd in the World Triathlon Junior Women's Grand Final in 2017 and 2018 respectively.

In 2018, Waugh was added the British Triathlon Olympic Podium Potential team.

A step up to the U23 category in 2019 saw further success, with Waugh coming 3rd in her first Olympic distance ITU World Cup race in Nur-Sultan before further success at the Grand Final in Lausanne, where she was 4th in the U23 Women and 2nd in the Mixed U23 relay alongside Alex Yee, Ben Dijkstra and Olivia Mathias.

After a year affected by the COVID-19 pandemic, which Waugh described as especially difficult due to missing out on " “the competitive environment, the buzz around competition and racing, training with my friends & training groups", Waugh returned in 2021 to secure back-to-back second-place World Triathlon Cup medals behind then training partner Beth Potter in Haeundae and Tongyeong.

2022 saw Waugh's most successful year to date, with a third World Triathlon Cup medal courtesy of a bronze in Bergen, before ending her U23 career by winning the World Championship Finals in Abu Dhabi.

In 2023, Waugh secured three top tens in elite events, before coming second in the World Championship finals to teammate Beth Potter, ending up a career-high ninth in the World Rankings.

In June 2024, Waugh was selected to represent Great Britain at the Paris 2024 Olympic Games. She competed in the women's triathlon at the Olympics, ultimately placing 15th.

=== Super League Triathlon ===
Waugh first took part in the Super League Triathlon series in 2018 in Jersey, where she wore the white jersey. Waugh has competed in every edition of the London Arena Games since 2021, and secured her first victory in the Championships format in Toulouse in 2023, resulting in her leading the series after a fifth place in Canary Warf the previous week.

In October 2023, Waugh came in second in the final event of the season in NEOM, Saudi Arabia, to claim the overall title ahead of Jeanne Lehair of Luxembourg.

==== 2025 - T100 Triathlon Series ====
In 2025 Kate Waugh was selected by the Professional Triathletes Organisation (PTO) as a Hot Shot for the middle distance Triathlon series, T100 Triathlon. The first event took place in Singapore on 5 April 2025. Waugh was part of the lead swim group, with fellow Britons Jess Learmonth and Lucy Charles-Barclay. She won with a six minute 41 second margin ahead of Austrian triathlete Lisa Perterer, Charles-Barclay in third place.

In the second round in San Francisco, Waugh recorded another podium, finishing third to lead the series by 17 points. Having skipped the third round in Vancouver, Waugh returned to the series in London, finishing second after being overhauled by Lucy Charles-Barclay in the final kilometres of the run. This left Waugh in second place overall in the series, having finished on each step of the podium in her first three races.

Having missed the French Riviera race through illness, Waugh returned to the series in Spain, again coming second behind Charles-Barclay to qualify for the World Championship final in Qatar, having taken four podiums. This left her tied on points with Charles Barclay at the top of the rankings, albeit placed second for having fewer wins.

Waugh continued her run of podiumed by winning the Wollongong T100 with a five minute and nine seconds margin over Ashleigh Gentle in a dominant display where she was the fastest athlete across all three disciplines.

Waugh subsequently took the lead in the series ahead of Lucy Charles-Barclay, before taking a sixth consecutive podium at the Dubai T100 behind Julie Derron, leaving her in pole position going into the final race in Qatar.

At the Grand Final in Qatar, Waugh defeated her overall title rivals Julie Derron and Lucy Charles-Barclay to take her third win, sixth podium, and become the T100 World Champion for 2025.

Following a change in the calculation methodology, Waugh became the PTO top-ranked female triathlete in the world at the beginning of 2026, replacing Lucy Charles-Barclay.

==== 2026 - Return to Short Course and T100 Defence ====
Waugh was unable to race the opening event of the 2026 T100 Series in Australia due to a calf injury, which meant she was unable to race as World Number One. However, she made a successful return to short course racing at the World Triathlon Cup in Chengdu, coming third in photo finish in only her second short course event in two years.

A recurrence of the calf injury at the Yokohama World Triathlon Championship Series also prevented her from taking part in the second T100 event of the season in May. Waugh was however able to return for the third round of the series in Vancouver, where she finished second despite a late elbow injury caused by slipping into a barrier in the last kilometre. Waugh thus continued her record of podiuming at every T100 event she has entered.

Waugh has confirmed her intent to race further short-course races in order to qualify for the 2028 Summer Olympics.

== Personal life ==
Until March 2025, Waugh split her time between Monte Gordo, Portugal, and Font Romeu, near Odeillo in France. She now lives in Andorra. She is in a relationship with professional racing driver Jules Gounon.

Waugh comes from a sporting family, with her great-grandfather Edward Holder having represented the All Blacks. Edward's uncle Arthur Holder was a world record holder in the 440 yard hurdles. Her heritage means Waugh also holds New Zealand citizenship.

She is sponsored by Cervelo, having previously been sponsored by Specialized, Swift and Canyon Bicycles, as well as Orca wetsuits, nutritional product BOA Blast, and Fusion Sportswear. In October 2023 she announced a partnership with Swiss athletic company On. In March 2025 Waugh announced a sponsorship deal with clothing company Ryzon, which was renewed for 2026. Waugh has previously modelled for Adidas.
