= Max Stapley =

British triathlete

Max Stapleton
Personal information
- Nationality: British
- Born: 30 January 1999

Sport
- Country: Great Britain
- Sport: Triathlon

Max Stapley (born 30 January 1999) is a French-born British national triathlete. Raised in-part in Australia he represented Australia until 2023 when he began to compete for Great Britain, where he was based.

== Early life ==
A British national, Stanley was born in France, and also raised in Canada and Wollongong, in New South Wales, Australia. He started triathlon at the age of 14 years-old with Wollongong Wizards. He graduated with a degree in politics, philosophy and economics.

== Career ==
In November 2022, he finished in sixth place in the U23 World Championships in Abu Dhabi. From January 2023, he represented Britain rather than Australia.

In January 2023, he finished second behind Aurelien Raphae at the Arena Games in Munich. Stapley made his World Triathlon Championship Series debut in Sunderland in July 2023. He helped Britain to mixed relay silver at the event. He also raced that year at the World Triathlon Championship Series in Pontevedra. In August 2023, he claimed second place at World Triathlon Cup in Yeongdo.

In March 2024, he finished sixth in the World Triathlon Cup event in Hong Kong. He won his first World Triathlon Cup gold in Chengdu in April 2024. He finished second at the supertri E World Championship in London in 2024. In August 2024, he won IRONMAN 70.3 Gdynia in Poland. During the race he opened up a 33 second lead in the swim and then produced his second fastest run at the distance and finished almost five minutes clear of Sweden’s Gabriel Sandoer in second. He joined the British Federation too late in the Olympic cycle to be eligible for selection for the 2024 Olympic Games. The Olympic Qualification Ranking Period opened on 27 May 2022 one day before his final race under Australian colours in Arzachena on 28 May 2022.

In April 2025, he made his debut on the World Tour in Singapore, placing thirteenth.

In March 2026, he placed sixth at the World Triathlon Cup Lanzarote.

== Personal life ==
From 2021, he was based in Leeds with his girlfriend, fellow triathlete, Kate Waugh. In 2023, they sought warmer weather and began to train in Portugal. They had split up by April 2025.
