= Rudy Von Berg =

American triathlete (born 1993)

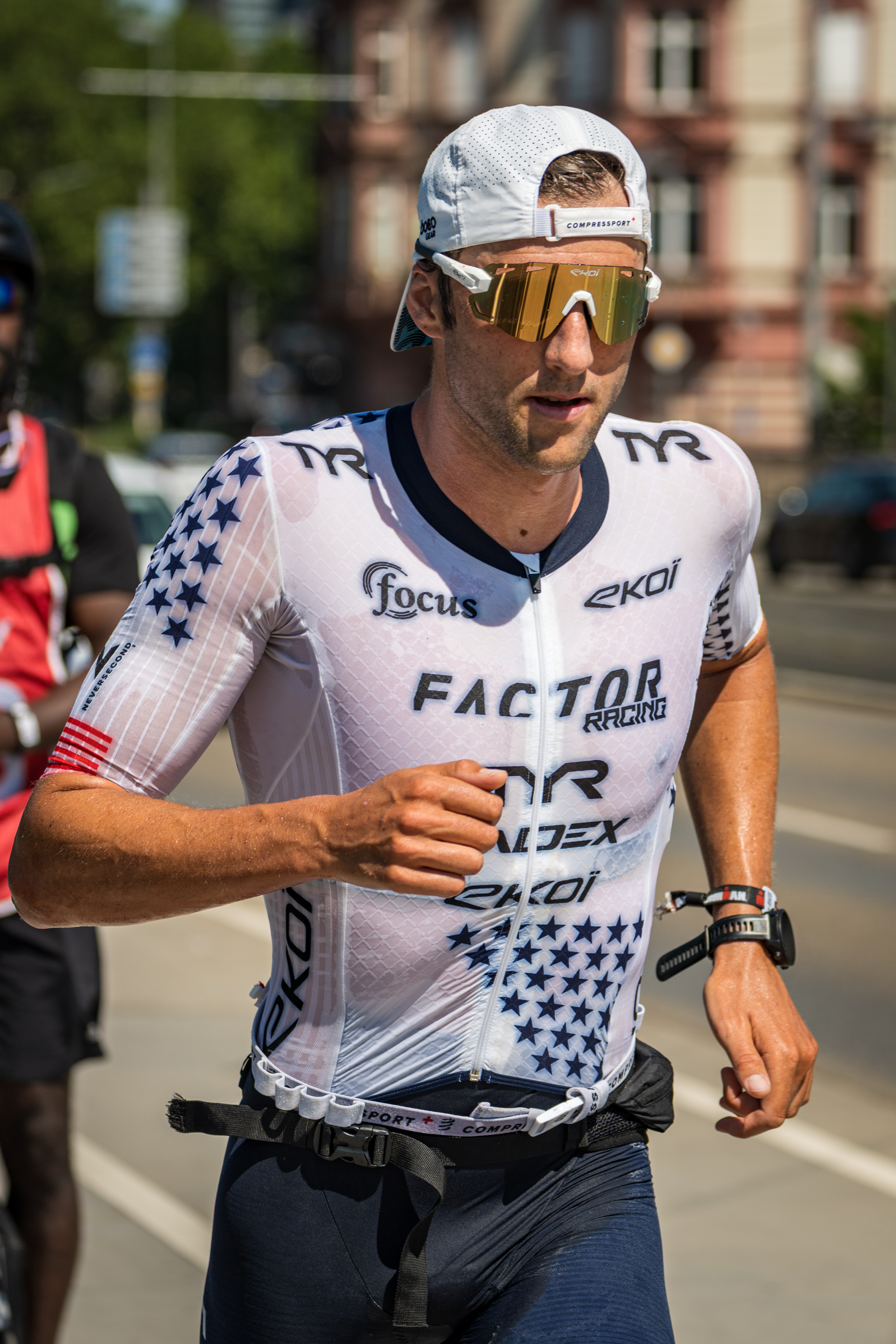
- Von Berg at the 2025 Ironman European Championships in Frankfurt

Personal information
- Full name: Rodolphe Von Berg
- Born: October 4, 1993 (age 32) Columbus, Georgia, United States
- Education: University of Colorado
- Height: 1.88 m (6 ft 2 in)
- Weight: 75 kg (165 lb)
- Website: rudyvonberg.com

Sport
- Country: United States
- Sport: Triathlon
Medal record
Representing United States
Men's triathlon
Ironman 70.3 World Championships
Bronze medal – third place	2019 Nice	Elite
Ironman World Championships
Bronze medal – third place	2024 Kona	Elite

Rodolphe "Rudy" Von Berg (born October 4, 1993) is an American professional triathlete. He has won bronze medals at the 2019 Ironman 70.3 World Championships and 2024 Ironman World Championships.

== Biography ==
Von Berg was born in Columbus, Georgia and grew up in Nice, France before moving back to the United States when he was 19. His father was also a competitive triathlete. He attended the University of Colorado in Boulder, Colorado, where he graduated in 2017 with a degree in marketing. He also won two national collegiate titles in the triathlon.

The following year, he won the Ironman 70.3 European Championships in Denmark, defending his title in 2019. He also won the Iron 70.3 Buenos Aires in 2018 and 2019, and the Iron 70.3 Nice in 2018 and the Ironman 70.3 St. George in 2019.

In September 2019, he finished third at the Ironman 70.3 World Championships in Nice. In July 2021, Von Berg won the Ironman 70.3 Switzerland with a new course record. In June 2022, he won the long-distance Ironman France in Nice. In April 2023, he won the Ironman Texas, improving the course record to 7 hours, 44 minutes and 51 seconds. In October 2024, he finished third at the Ironman World Championships in Kona and was the highest placing American.
