= Sam Long (triathlete) =

American triathlete (born 1995)

Personal information
- Nickname: Big Unit
- Born: December 23, 1995 (age 30) Boulder, Colorado, United States
- Education: University of Colorado
- Height: 6 ft 4 in (193 cm)
- Website: www.samgolong.com

Sport
- Country: United States
- Sport: Triathlon
- Coached by: Self coached
Medal record
Representing United States
Men's triathlon
Ironman 70.3 World Championships
Silver medal – second place	2021 St. George	Elite

Sam Long (born December 23, 1995) is an American professional triathlete. He won a silver medal at the 2021 Ironman 70.3 World Championships.

== Biography ==
Long was born prematurely as one of three triplets in Boulder, Colorado, and grew up mountain biking and swimming with his parents. He competed in his first Ironman at the age of 17, prior to attending the University of Colorado, where he graduated with a double major in psychology and physiology. He then turned professional in 2016, and took his first major victory at the Ironman 70.3 Chattanooga in 2019. In 2021, he finished second to Gustav Iden at the Ironman 70.3 World Championship in St. George, Utah.

== Major results ==
Year	Competition	Country	Place	Time
2025	Ironman 70.3 Eagleman	United States	1	3h 36' 50"
2025	Ironman 70.3 Chattanooga	United States	1	3h 08' 08"
2025	Ironman 70.3 St. George	United States	2	3h 40' 08"
2024	Singapore T100	Singapore	2	3h 22' 38"
2024	Ironman Chattanooga	United States	1	6h 32' 11"
2024	Ironman 70.3 St. George	United States	1	3h 39' 16"
2024	Miami T100	United States	2	3h 09' 43"
2024	Ironman 70.3 Oceanside	United States	2	3h 47' 35"
2024	Ironman 70.3 Pucon	Chile	1	3h 46' 31"
2023	Ironman 70.3 Indian Wells-La Quinta	United States	3	3h 40' 27"
2023	Ironman Maryland	United States	3	7h 5' 07"
2023	Ironman 70.3 Boulder	United States	1	3h 33' 23"
2023	Ironman 70.3 Gulf Coast	United States	1	3h 36' 00"
2023	Ironman 70.3 St. George	United States	1	3h 43' 04"
2022	Ironman 70.3 Indian Wells-La Quinta	United States	1	3h 43' 34"
2022	Ironman 70.3 Gdynia	Poland	1	3h 37' 55"
2021	Xterra Beaver Creek	United States	2	2h 06' 01"
2021	Ironman 70.3 Boulder	United States	1	3h 37' 35"
2021	Ironman Coeur d'Alene	United States	1	8h 7' 40"
2021	Ironman 70.3 St. George	United States	2	3h 43' 01"
2021	Ironman 70.3 World Championship	United States	2	3h 41' 09"
2020	Ironman 70.3 Cozumel	Mexico	1	3h 42' 43"
2019	Ironman Chattanooga	United States	1	8h 22' 20"
2019	Ironman 70.3 Victoria	Canada	1	3h 55' 48"
2019	Ironman 70.3 Chattanooga	United States	1	3h 48' 50"
2018	Ironman Louisville	United States	2	7h 39' 21"
2016	Ironman 70.3 Calgary	Canada	2	3h 50' 41"
