= Blue Bay Marine Park =

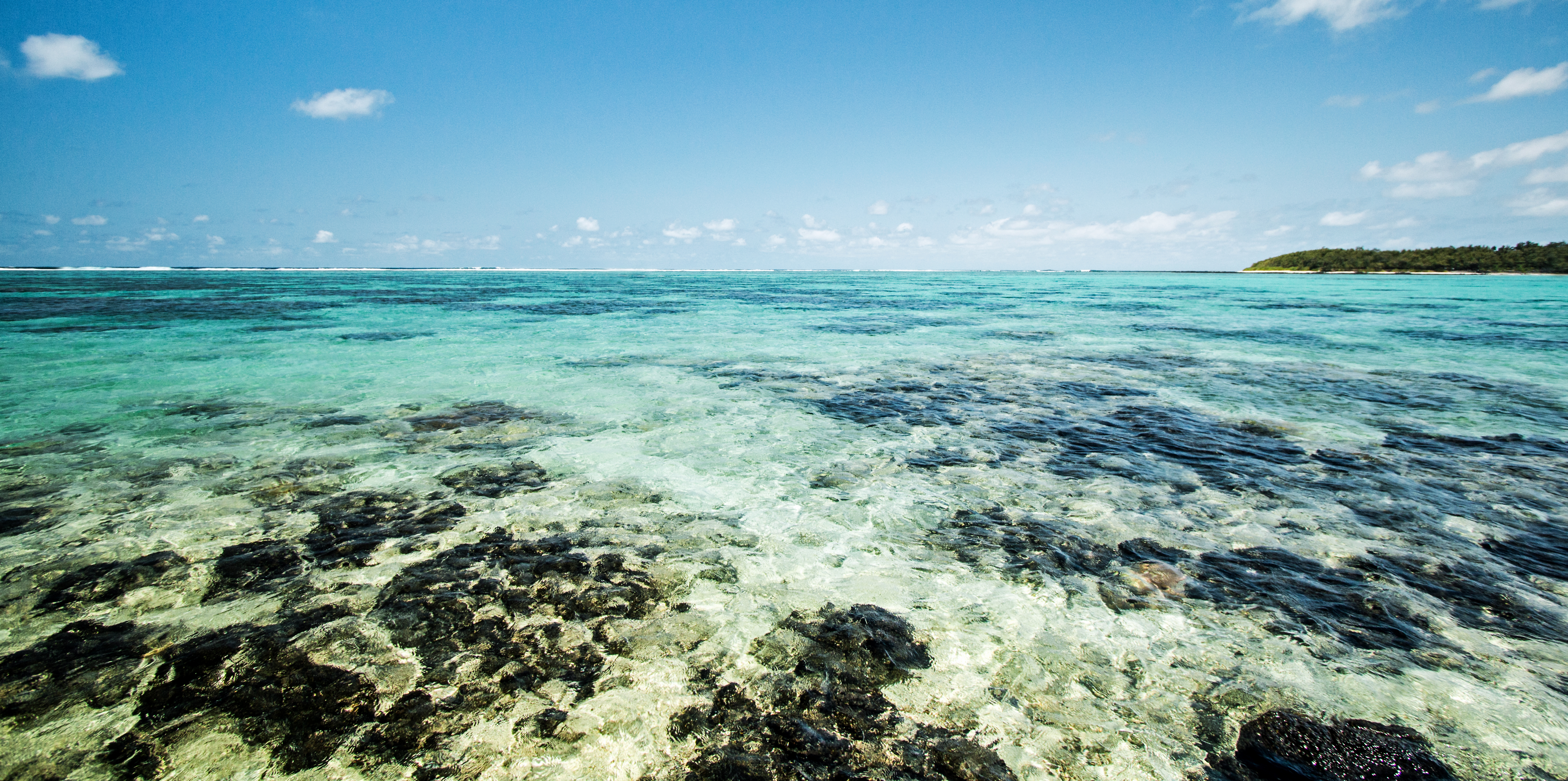

Blue Bay Marine Park is a marine reserve in the south-east of Mauritius. The 353 hectare area was declared a national park in October 1997. In June 2000 it was granted Marine Park status under the Mauritian Fisheries and Marine Resources Act. On January 31, 2008, Blue Bay Marine Park was designated a "Wetland of International Importance" under the Ramsar Convention.
