= Lucy Charles-Barclay =

English triathlete (born 1993)

Lucy Anne Charles-Barclay
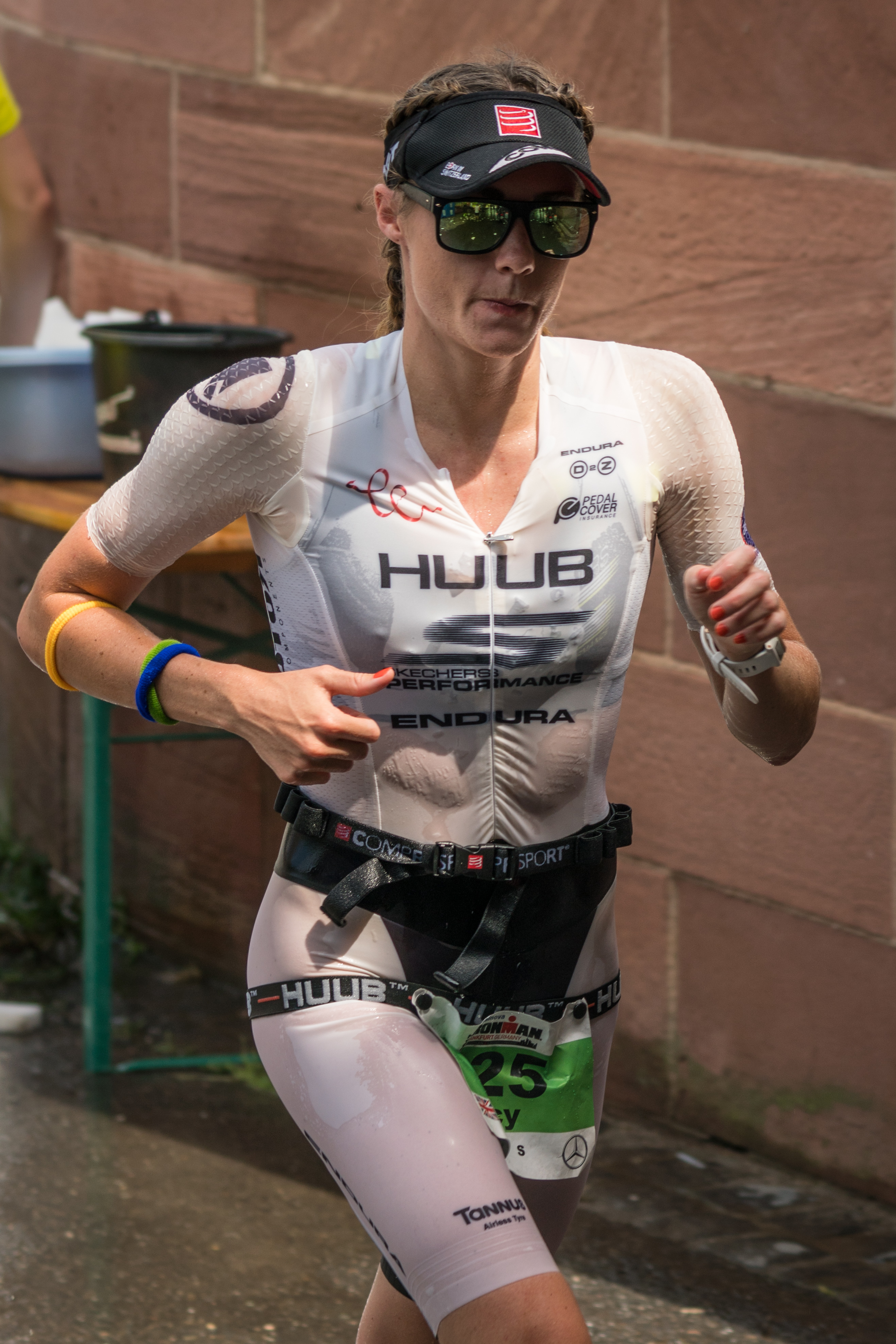
- Lucy Charles-Barclay at the 2017 Ironman European Championship in Frankfurt

Personal information
- Born: 15 September 1993 (age 33) Hoddesdon, England
- Agent: BPM Sport
- Height: 170 cm (5 ft 7 in)
- Weight: 58 kg (128 lb)
- Website: lucycharles.com

Sport
- Country: UK
- Coached by: Reece Barclay
- Now coaching: Pulse Fitness Triathlon

Achievements and titles
- Personal best: Ironman: 8:24:31 (2023)
Medal record
Women's triathlon
Representing Great Britain
Ironman World Championship
| Gold medal – first place | 2023 | Individual |
| Silver medal – second place | 2022 | Individual |
| Silver medal – second place | 2019 | Individual |
| Silver medal – second place | 2018 | Individual |
| Silver medal – second place | 2017 | Individual |
Ironman 70.3 World Championship
| Gold medal – first place | 2025 | Individual |
| Gold medal – first place | 2021 | Individual |
| Silver medal – second place | 2018 | Individual |
World Triathlon Long Distance Championships
| Gold medal – first place | 2022 | Individual |

Lucy Charles-Barclay (born 15 September 1993) is an English professional triathlete specialising in the long- and 70.3 distances. She is the 2023 World Ironman champion and the 2021 and 2025 World Champion in the 70.3 discipline, both under the authority of the World Triathlon Corporation. In between, she won the World Triathlon Long Distance Championships in 2022. Charles-Barclay is also a multiple T100 triathlon winner. In 2023, she broke the course record for the iconic Kona Ironman course.

Prior to taking up triathlon, Charles was an elite distance and open water swimmer. She attempted to gain selection for the British swimming team for the 2012 Olympic trials in both the pool and open water. She was, however, unsuccessful, despite having beaten open water trials winner Keri-anne Payne in the Great North Swim a month previously. Charles subsequently made her debut in triathlon in 2014 and went on to win the 18–24 women’s age category at the 2015 Ironman World Championship as an amateur. She subsequently turned professional. Her husband Reece Barclay is a British professional IronMan triathlete as well and also coaches Lucy at the professional level.

During her first Ironman of 2018, the African Ironman Championship, she set a new personal best time of 8:56:10. This beat her previous best from the 2017 Ironman Worlds, where she came in with a time of 8:59:48 and was a runner-up behind Daniela Ryf.

In 2021, she won the Ironman 70.3 World Championship finishing over 8 minutes faster than her nearest competitor. 2025 saw her win at the event again in Marbella. In 2026, she is competing in Lanzarote Ironman

== Early years ==
Charles was born north of London, England. When Charles was 8 years old, she started swimming. A year later she was beating other swimmers that were three or four years older than her. She convinced her coaches to let her compete in events such as the 200-metre butterfly. By the age of 16 she was a national champion. In 2010, there was a test event in which Charles competed, she finished 16th, the top competitor from Great Britain. She was 17 at the time and it was her first ever 10K swim. The Olympic Games 2012 were hosted in London, and the 10K open-water swim, which is seen as the marathon in swimming, was part of it for the second time.

For the 2012 Olympics, Charles's biggest competitor was Keri-Anne Payne, who had already won an Olympic silver medal at the open water debut in 2008. Although Charles was doing really well on the build up towards the Olympics it wasn’t enough to be selected. Britain had only one slot, which went to Payne. Charles who was still a teenager at the time was so devastated, that at some point in 2013 she lost the motivation to only keep swimming for the next Olympic opportunity in 2016.

In 2014, at age 19, she started her first triathlon. At the time Charles had no experience of competitive running or cycling. In her second year, in 2015, Charles not only qualified for the World Championships but won in her age-group. In the same year, she became U23 World Champion in Ironman 70.3. In 2016 she became a professional triathlon athlete.

== Triathlon career ==
In May 2017, Charles won Ironman Lanzarote. Furthermore she also won the Challenge Family's The Championship. She also won a second place at the Ironman European Championships. She won the swim in that race in 48:29 minutes and finished the race only 4 minutes behind winner Sarah Crowley. At the Ironman World Championship in October 2017, she again landed a second place behind four time World Champion Daniela Ryf.

In April 2018, at Ironman South Africa, Charles won her second Ironman race. In the same year she again won Challenge's The Championship. In September, she came second at the Ironman 70.3 World Championships. At the 2018 Ironman World Championship in October she again landed in second place behind Daniela Ryf and broke the swim record with 48:13 minutes. Her overall time of 8:36:24 is the second fastest in race history.

In 2019, Charles won Challenge Roth and the European Ironman Championships with her personal record of 8:31:09 hours for the entire race.

She followed that with a third consecutive second place finish at the 2019 Ironman World Championship, clocking 8:46:44.

In 2021, she won the Ironman 70.3 World Championship, finishing over 8 minutes faster than her nearest competitor.

In 2023, she became the Ironman World Champion in Kailua-Kona after four times coming second.

In 2024, she received two second place finishes at the PTO T100 Triathlon, one to India Lee in Miami and another one to Ashleigh Gentle in Singapore. She announced that she planned to validate her slot for the 2024 Ironman World Championships held in Nice, France. She succeeded in validating her slot with a win in Ironman France. In the London leg of the T100 tour, she injured herself on the run and was forced to withdraw, her first ever professional DNF.

Charles-Barclay began her 2025 season with a 3rd place finish at the Singapore T100 Triathlon. Only Kate Waugh and Lisa Perterer ahead of her. She followed this with wins at Ironman Lanzarote and Ironman 70.3 Eagleman. In august she won the T100 London and the T100 Spain in september. She finished the season with a win at the 2025 Ironman 70.3 World Championships.

She is one of the strongest swimmers in triathlon.

Charles lives in Chingford, Essex, and is coached by her husband Reece.

== Notable results ==
| Date | Event | Rank |
|---|---|---|
| 8 November 2025 | 2025 Ironman 70.3 World Championships | 1 |
| 20 September 2025 | T100 Triathlon Spain | 1 |
| 9 August 2025 | T100 Triathlon London | 1 |
| 5 April 2025 | T100 Triathlon Singapore | 3 |
| 13 April 2024 | T100 Triathlon Singapore | 2 |
| 9 March 2024 | T100 Triathlon Miami | 2 |
| 14 October 2023 | 2023 IRONMAN World Championship | 1 |
| 18 September 2021 | 2021 Ironman 70.3 World Championship | 1 |
| 12 October 2019 | 2019 Ironman World Championship | 2 |
| 7 July 2019 | 2019 Challenge Roth, Germany | 1 |
| 7 April 2019 | 2019 Ironman African Championship, South Africa | 1 |
| 13 October 2018 | 2018 Ironman World Championship | 2 |
| 1 September 2018 | IRONMAN 70.3 World Championship, South Africa | 2 |
| 2 June 2018 | Challenge Championship | 1 |
| 15 April 2018 | 2018 Ironman African Championship, South Africa | 1 |
| 14 October 2017 | 2017 Ironman World Championship | 2 |
| 2 September 2017 | Ironman 70.3 Lanzarote | 2 |
| 9 July 2017 | Ironman European Championship Frankfurt | 2 |
| 3 June 2017 | Challenge Championship | 1 |
| 20 May 2017 | Ironman Lanzarote | 1 |
| 21 May 2016 | Ironman Lanzarote | 3 |
| 10 October 2015 | Ironman World Championship | 1 (18–24 age group) |
| 30 August 2015 | Ironman 70.3 World Championship | 1 (18–24 age group) |

== Personal life ==
In 2024, Charles-Barclay was diagnosed with coeliac disease, which had caused her to suffer stress fractures, low energy and joint pain.
