= Taylor Knibb =

American triathlete (born 1998)

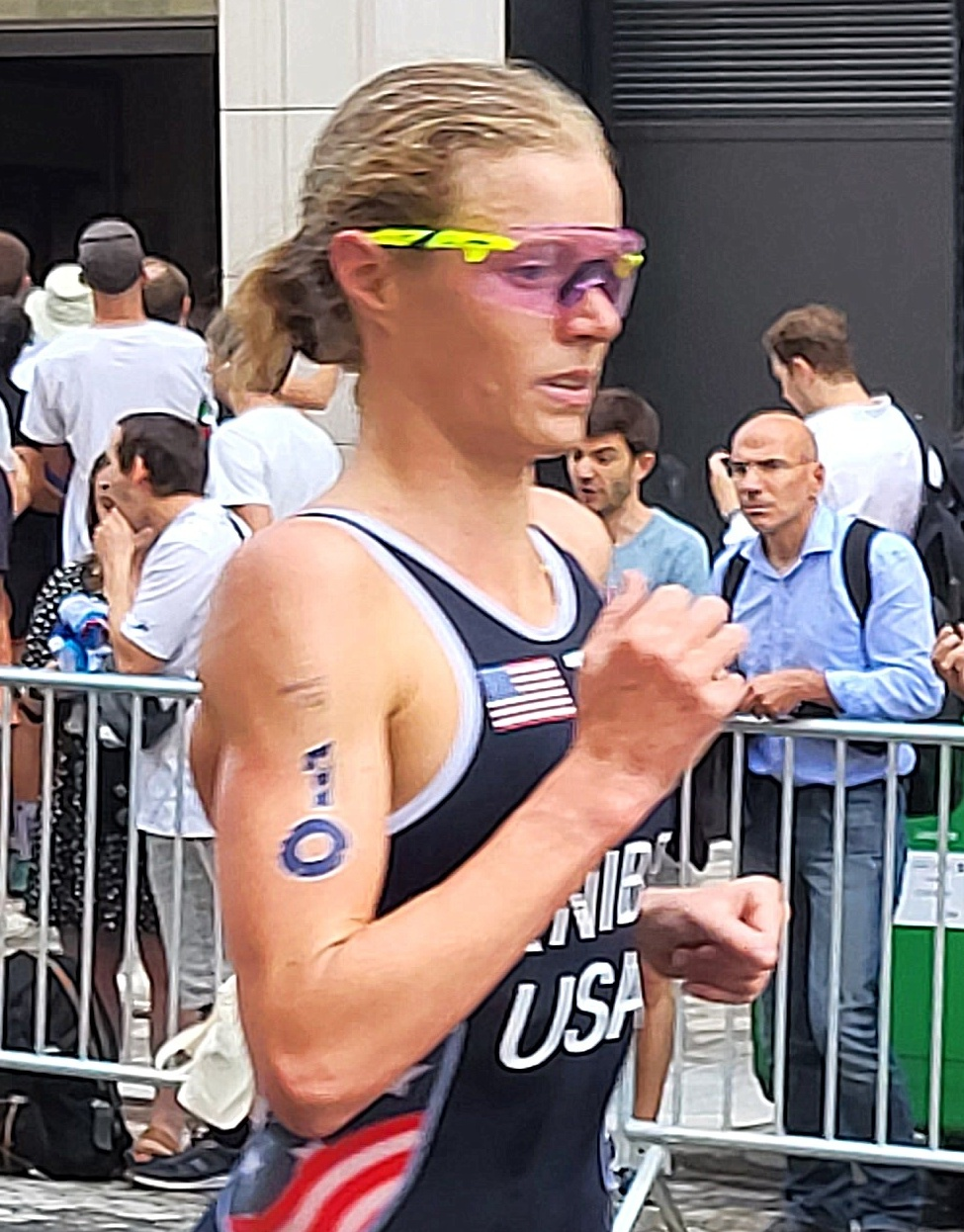
- Knibb in 2024

Personal information
- Nationality: American
- Born: February 14, 1998 (age 28)

Sport
- Sport: Triathlon, Individual time trial
- Coached by: Jennifer Hutchinson (2014–2015); Ian OBrien (2015–2017); Neal Henderson (2017–2020); Ian OBrien (2020–2023); Dan Lorang (2024–present)
Medal record
Women's triathlon
Representing the United States
Olympic Games
Silver medal – second place	2020 Tokyo	Mixed relay
Silver medal – second place	2024 Paris	Mixed relay
Ironman 70.3 World Championship
Bronze medal – third place	2021	Individual
Gold medal – first place	2022	Individual
Gold medal – first place	2023	Individual
Gold medal – first place	2024	Individual
Silver medal – second place	2025	Individual
Gold medal – first place	2026	Individual
Ironman World Championship
Gold medal – first place	2026	Individual

Taylor Knibb (born February 14, 1998) is an American triathlete and the 2022, 2023, 2024, and 2026 Women's Ironman 70.3 World Champion. She has won the Ironman World Championship in Kona 2026. She competed in the women's event at the 2020 Summer Olympics, held in Tokyo in 2021, finishing sixteenth. Later that same Olympics, she won a silver medal in the mixed relay event. Knibb is the youngest woman ever to qualify for the US Olympic triathlon team. Knibb qualified for two sports at the 2024 Summer Olympics, triathlon and the cycling time trial. Knibb also competes in the middle distance triathlon race series, T100 Triathlon.

== Early life ==
Knibb began participating in triathlons at age 11, inspired by watching her mother, Leslie Knibb, compete in the Ironman triathlon. At age 15, she began competing on the youth and junior elite circuit. At Sidwell Friends School for high school, she participated in swim and cross country, while continuing to compete in triathlon. In 2014 and 2015 she was named both the Washington D.C. Gatorade Cross Country Runner of the Year and the D.C. State Athletic Association Runner of the Year.

Following in the footsteps of many of her family members, she attended Cornell, where she ran NCAA track and cross country for four years, and competed on the swim team her senior year. She graduated in 2020.

Her role models include her mother, Tamara Gorman and Gwen Jorgensen.

She joined the national triathlon team in 2017, and as of 2021 remained the youngest athlete on the team.

== Career ==
In her junior career, she won the USA Triathlon Junior National Championship in 2015 and 2016, the Junior World Championships in 2016 and 2017, and the U23 World Championships in 2018. At the 2017 ITU World Triathlon Series in Edmonton she finished second to become the youngest woman to podium in the series.

Knibb earned her spot on the US Olympic team after she won gold in the season opener of the 2021 World Triathlon Championship Series, held on May 15, 2021, in Yokohama, Japan.

In 2021 Knibb won the PTO Collins Cup along with a series of podiums and wins at Boulder 70.3, that burst her onto the world scene.

In 2022 Knibb Won the Oceanside Ironman 70.3 and broke the course record. This was the start of a great series of long course events for the season. In October 2022 Knibb won the Women's Ironman 70.3 World Championship, held in St George, Utah, becoming the youngest woman to win the race. One year later, Knibb successfully defended the title. Taylor crossed the line 1st in the 2024 Ironman 70.3 World Championship in Taupo, NZ with a final time of 03:57:34, marking it her 3rd consecutive Ironman 70.3 world title.

Knibb made her Ironman World Championships debut in 2023, finishing in fourth place. At the Paris Test Event in August 2023, Knibb placed fifth, qualifying her to compete in Triathlon for team USA at the 2024 Summer Olympics. In May 2024, she won the Time Trial at the USA Cycling National Road Championships, qualifying her for the Time Trial cycling event Paris 2024 and making her a rare dual-sport Olympian. She finished nineteenth in the event, after crashing four times in the rainy conditions. For the triathlon events, she finished nineteenth in the women's event before anchoring the US team to a repeat silver medal in the mixed relay. Knibb was the second Cornell alumnus to win a medal in the 2024 Olympics, following Michael Grady's gold medal with the U.S. men's four rowing team.

As of 2024 Taylor Knibb had won three out of the three races she has competed in in the PTO's T100 World Tour. She won in San Francisco, Ibiza and Las Vegas.

== Coaches ==
Knibb has been coached by a series of professional coaches.

Jennifer Hutchinson: (Unknown to 2015). Hutchinson coached Knibb to a podium performance at the 2015 Junior ITU World Championships in Chicago USA. Competing primarily in the USA Triathlon Junior Elite Racing series. Hutchinson coached Knibb until late 2015.

Ian O'Brien: (2015 to 2017). OBrien coached Knibb in her first series of professional wins and an ITU Junior World Championship title in Cozumel Mexico, a Bronze medal in her first ITU Triathlon World Cup in Montreal Canada and an 11th place finish at the ITU World Series Championship in Stockholm Sweden. O'Brien coached Knibb until the late stages of 2017.

Neal Henderson: (2017 to 2020). Henderson coached Knibb while she attended Cornell University. Henderson took over as Knibbs coach in late 2017. Knibb retained the ITU Junior World Championship title in 2017, had a 2nd place finish at the ITU World Triathlon series in Edmonton in 2017, and won the U23 ITU World Championship in 2018.

Ian O'Brien: (2020 to 2023). In the 2021 season Knibb won Yokohama World Series by breaking away with Maya Kingma. This result secured her Olympic Qualification. Knibb won the Silver medal as part of the Mixed Team Relay at the Tokyo Olympic Games. Knibb won the PTO Collins Cup. Knibb won the World Series Grand Final in Edmonton by breaking away with an incredible lead on to the run. With a Silver Medal in Montreal World Triathlon Championship Series race. Knibb then turned to middle distance and won Ironman Oceanside 70.3 and broke the course record. Knibb took second place at Ironman Boulder 70.3. Finishing in 3rd place at the Ironman 70.3 World Championships in St George Utah.

In 2022 Knibb won the Ironman World 70.3 Championship in St George Utah. Also taking the bronze medal in World Triathlon Championship Series Cagliari and silver in the World Triathlon Championship Series Bermuda.

In 2023 Knibb retained her Ironman World 70.3 championship title in Lahti Finland setting a new world record, qualified for the Paris Olympic Games, won the Boulder Ironman 70.3, won bronze in the World Triathlon Championship Series race in Yokohama Japan, and won the PTO US Open in Milwaukee.

Dan Lorang (2024 to present). Lorang continued Knibbs' success with multiple T100 victories and podiums throughout 2024 and 2025. Lorang coached Knibb through her 2024 Paris Olympic Games performances with a 19th place finish in Triathlon and 19th place finish in Cycling Time Trial along with a silver medal in the Mixed Team Relay. Knibb is also coached by Lawrence Van Lingen, Julie Dibbens and Erin Carson. Knibb retained her World Ironman 70.3 Title for the 3rd year running. Knibb won the T100 World Championship in 2024.

In 2025:. 2nd place at Ironman 70.3 World Championship (Marbella). 2nd Place at IRONMAN Texas. 3rd place T100 London. 1st T100 Vancouver. 2nd T100 San Francisco. DNF IRONMAN World Championship (Kona).

In 2026: . 1st place 2026 T100 Triathlon World Tour Gold Coast. 1st place 2026 Athletic Brewing IRONMAN 70.3 Oceanside. 2nd Place at IRONMAN Texas.
