= Magnus Ditlev =

Danish triathlete

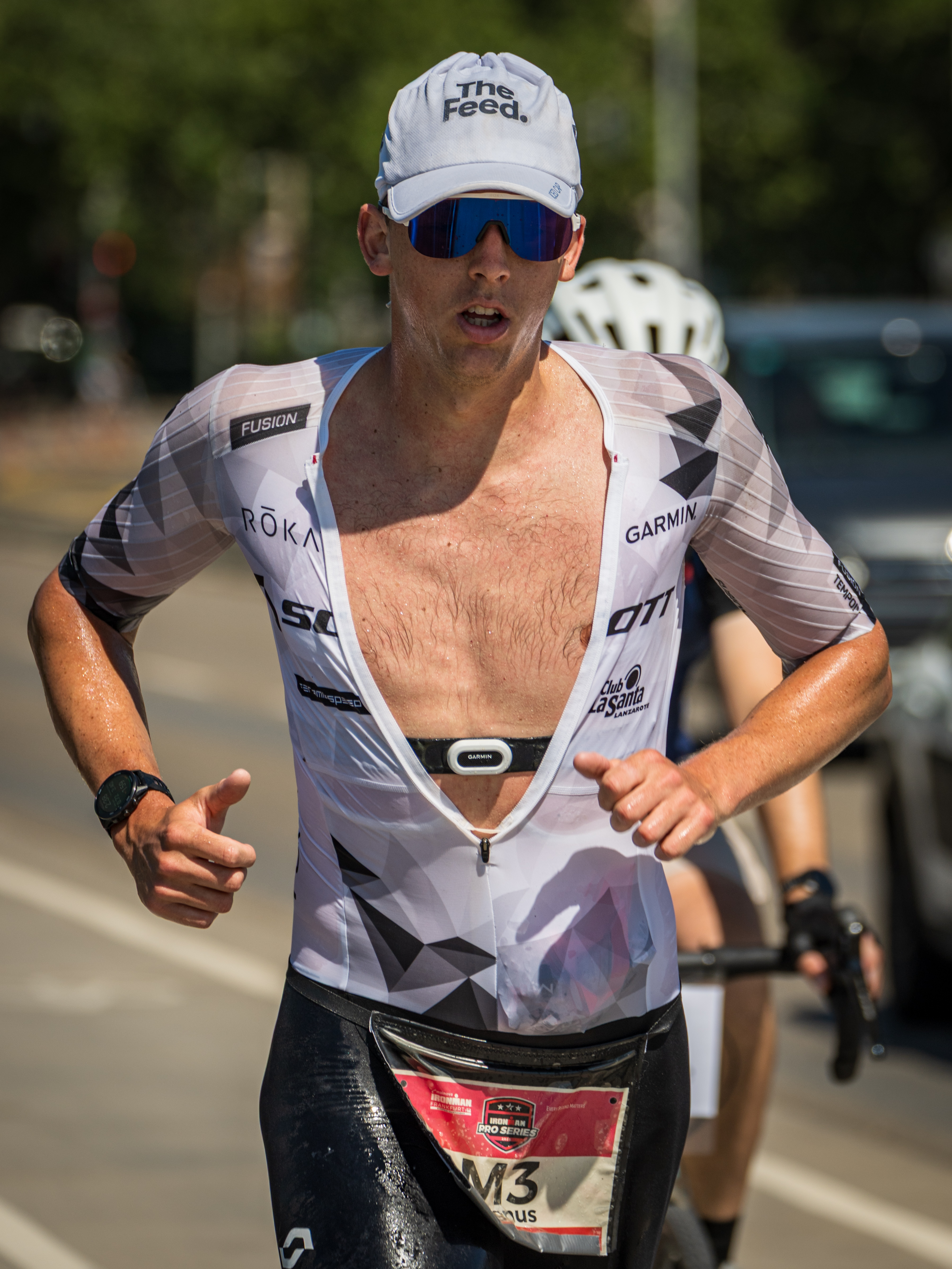
- Ditlev in 2025

Personal information
- Born: 31 October 1997 (age 29) Virum, Denmark
- Height: 1.95 m (6 ft 5 in)
- Weight: 79 kg (174 lb)
- Website: https://www.magnusditlev.dk/

Sport
- Country: Denmark
- Sport: Triathlon
Medal record
Representing Denmark
Men's triathlon
Ironman World Championships
| Bronze medal – third place | 2023 Nice | Elite |
| Silver medal – second place | 2024 Kona | Elite |
Ironman 70.3 World Championships
| Bronze medal – third place | 2022 St. George | Elite |

Magnus Elbæk Ditlev (born 31 October 1997) is a Danish professional triathlete and the Ironman distance world record holder.

Considered one of the strongest cyclists in triathlon, Magnus Ditlev's first professional victory was in 2020 at the Ironman 70.3 Gdynia. The following year, Ditlev won two more races: the Challenge Budva and Ironman 70.3 Cascais. He won bronze medals at the 2022 Ironman 70.3 World Championships and the 2023 Ironman World Championship. In 2024 he became the best ever Dane on the Big Island with his 2nd-place finish at the Ironman World Championship in Kona after Patrick Lange. He has also won the 2022, 2023 and 2024 Challenge Roth, where, in both 2023 and 2024, he set the then Ironman distance world record time at 7 hours, 23 minutes and 24 seconds (set in 2024 after attacking early on the bike and riding and running solo from around 10 km on the bike). In March 2024, he finished fourth at the T100 Triathlon World Tour, where he won the first race of the Series, the T100 Miami.

On 7 November 2026 Magnus Ditlev won IRONMAN Florida in the fastest time ever recorded in an ironman race at 7 hours, 19 minutes and 17 seconds.
