= Hayden Wilde =

New Zealand triathlete (born 1997)

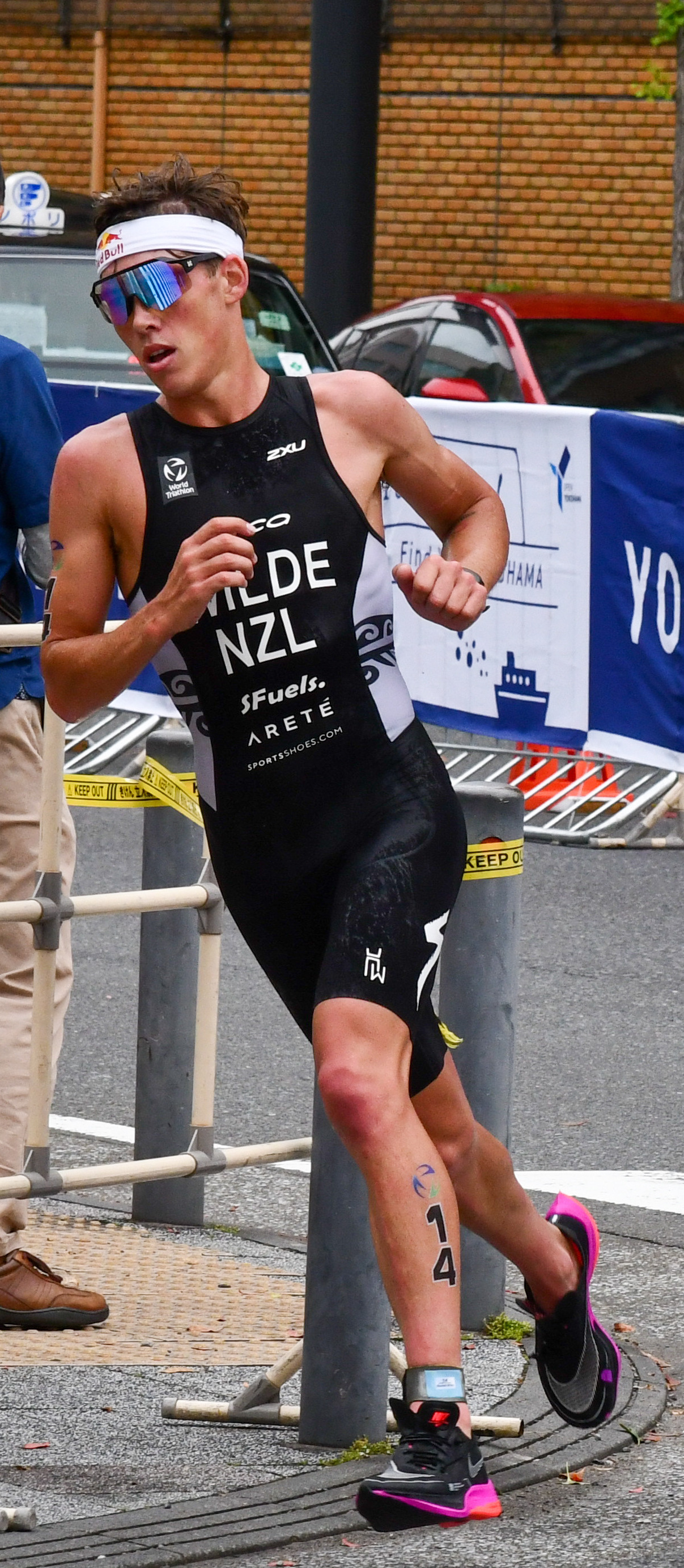
- Wilde competing in Yokohama in 2022

Personal information
- Nickname: The Maltese Falcon
- Born: 1 September 1997 (age 29) Taupō, New Zealand
- Height: 1.75 m (5 ft 9 in)
- Weight: 66 kg (146 lb)
- Website: haydenwilde.nz

Sport
- Country: New Zealand
- Sport: Triathlon
- Coached by: Craig Kirkwood
Medal record
Men's triathlon
Representing New Zealand
Olympic Games
Silver medal – second place	2024 Paris	Individual
Bronze medal – third place	2020 Tokyo	Individual
World Championships
Silver medal – second place	2023	Elite
Bronze medal – third place	2022	Elite
Bronze medal – third place	2024	Elite
World Sprint Championships
Gold medal – first place	2023 Hamburg	Elite
Silver medal – second place	2022 Montréal	Elite
XTERRA Triathlon World Championships
Gold medal – first place	2021	Elite
Commonwealth Games
Silver medal – second place	2022 Birmingham	Triathlon
Ironman 70.3 World Championship
Silver medal – second place	2024 Taupō	Individual

Hayden Wilde (born 1 September 1997) is a New Zealand professional triathlete. He was the silver medalist at the Paris Olympics in 2024 and the bronze medallist at the Tokyo Summer Olympics, the silver medalist at the 2022 Commonwealth Games and the winner of the 2021 XTERRA World Championships. He finished second in the 2021 Super League Triathlon Championship Series, having taken the win at the SLT London race. Wilde won the 2022 Super League Triathlon Championship Series, having been victorious in 3 of the 5 series races. In December 2025 Wilde became T100 World Champion following his first place finish at T100 Qatar 2025.

== Early life ==
Wilde was born in Taupō, is the youngest of three brothers, and grew up in Whakatāne, New Zealand. Wilde attended Trident High School. Growing up Wilde played soccer and hockey before moving into running for fitness.

== Career ==
Wilde has been coached by Craig Kirkwood since 2016 after he beat Kirkwood in a local half marathon and currently trains in Tauranga, New Zealand. Wilde only took up triathlon after watching the event at the 2016 Rio Olympics.

Wilde comes from a long-distance off-road background and has previously been the ITU Cross Tri U23 World Champion.

Career Highlights include:

- 3rd place at the 2019 Tokyo ITU World Triathlon Olympic Qualification Event
- 4th place at the 2019 ITU World Triathlon Edmonton
- 6th place at the 2019 Hamburg Wasser World Triathlon
- 10th place at the 2019 Daman World Triathlon Abu Dhabi
- 1st place at the 2019 Devonport OTU Sprint Triathlon Oceania Championships
- 3rd place at the 2020 Tokyo Summer Olympics.
- 2nd place in the 2021 Super League Triathlon Championship Series.
- Halberg award finalist for New Zealand's Favourite Sporting Moment 2022 for Tokyo Olympics Bronze medal win

=== 2019 season ===
Wilde finished the season in 11th place in the ITU World Triathlon Series rankings, with 2019 being the first year he appeared in the top 50.

=== 2021 season ===
Wilde finished fifth on the World Cup circuit in Leeds and third at the Europe Triathlon Championships in Austria. Wilde won the Super League Triathlon London race, ahead of France's Vincent Luis and British Athlete Jonny Brownlee. He went on to finish the 2021 Super League Triathlon Championship Series in 2nd, behind Britain's Alex Yee.

=== 2022 season ===
Wilde won the Arena Games Triathlon 2022 Series finale, held at Marina Bay, Singapore. It was his debut racing at Arena Games Triathlon format. This result was also good enough to see Wilde finish fifth in the inaugural Esport Triathlon World Championship.

He won a silver medal at the 2022 Commonwealth Games. This was, however, met with controversy when he was penalized for not racking his bike correctly, costing him a ten-second penalty, ultimately losing out on the gold to England's Alex Yee. Despite this, Wilde's sportsmanship was praised by the press and on social media.

Wilde made a strong start to the 2022 Super League Triathlon (SLT) season. He defended his SLT London title, with his second win in the British capital in as many years, and then finished third in SLT Munich the following week. Wilde followed up his early season success with further victories at SLT Malibu and SLT Toulouse, Super League's first event to be held in France. Wilde finished third at the 2022 SLT series finale in NEOM, this was enough for him to secure the overall series victory.

Wilde contested his penalty at the Triathlon at the 2022 Commonwealth Games but this was later rejected.

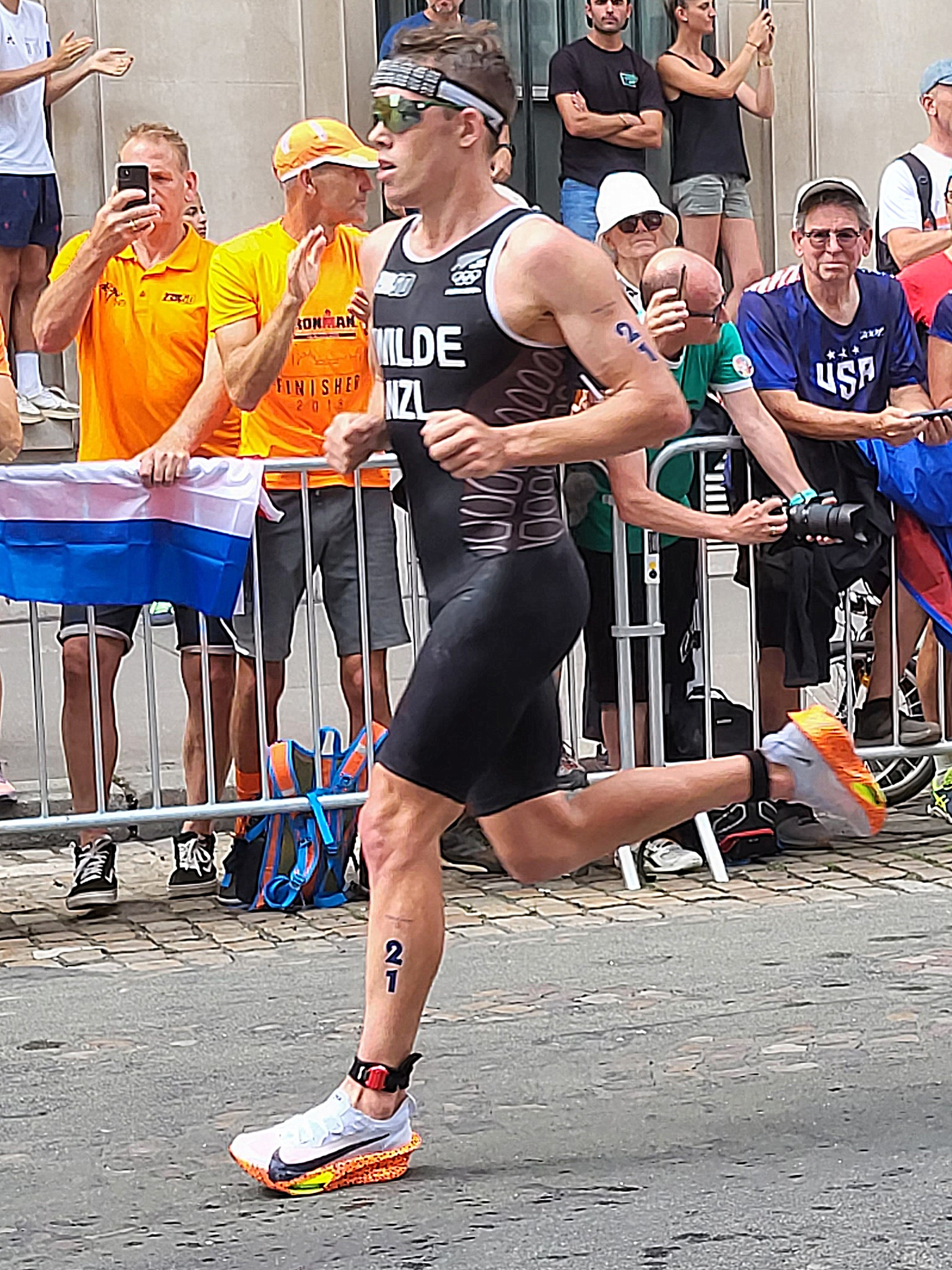
Hayden Wilde at the 2024 Paris Olympics

=== 2023 season ===
Wilde came first in three World Triathlon Championship Series races, New Plymouth, Yokohama and Hamburg Sprint and Relay Championships. He also won Ironman 70.3 melbourne.

=== 2024 season ===
In May he came second in WTCS Cagliari. He followed this up with a silver medal at the 2024 Olympic Games. He won again at WTCS Torremolinos. On 14th December Wilde came second at the 2024 Ironman 70.3 World Championships

=== 2025 season ===
In 2025 Wilde's season revolved mainly around the PTO's T100 Triathlon Series. He won T100 races in Singapore, London, The French Riviera, Spain and Wollongong. A Lap-count problem in Dubai saw Wilde come in 8th place, however in December Wilde came in first place at the Qatar T100 Triathlon World Championship Final, this sealed the overall win of the T100 series and he was crowned the T100 Series Champion 2025.

=== 2026 season ===
Wilde began the 2026 season in March with a third place at Ironman 70.3 Geelong. On the 25th of April he won T100 Singapore by over six minutes. On the 13th of September Wilde won the Ironman 70.3 World Championship in Nice, France.

== Sponsorship and advertising ==
April 2022 saw Wilde gain sponsorship from Red Bull. His bike sponsor is Canyon.

== World Triathlon Series competitions ==
Wilde's World Triathlon Series race results are:

Results list

Date	Competition	Place	Rank
2019-08-31	World Triathlon Series	Grand Final Lausanne	25
2019-08-16	World Triathlon Series	Tokyo Olympic Qualification Event	03

== World Triathlon Cup competitions ==
Wilde's World Triathlon Cup Series race results are:

Results list

Date	Competition	Place	Rank
2020-03-14	World Cup	Mooloolaba	02
2019-09-07	World Cup	Banyoles	05
2019-06-23	World Cup	Antwerp	DNF
2019-03-31	World Cup	New Plymouth	04
2018-06-07	World Cup	Antwerp	20
2018-06-02	World Cup	Cagliari	02
