= Morgan Pearson =

American triathlete (born 1993)

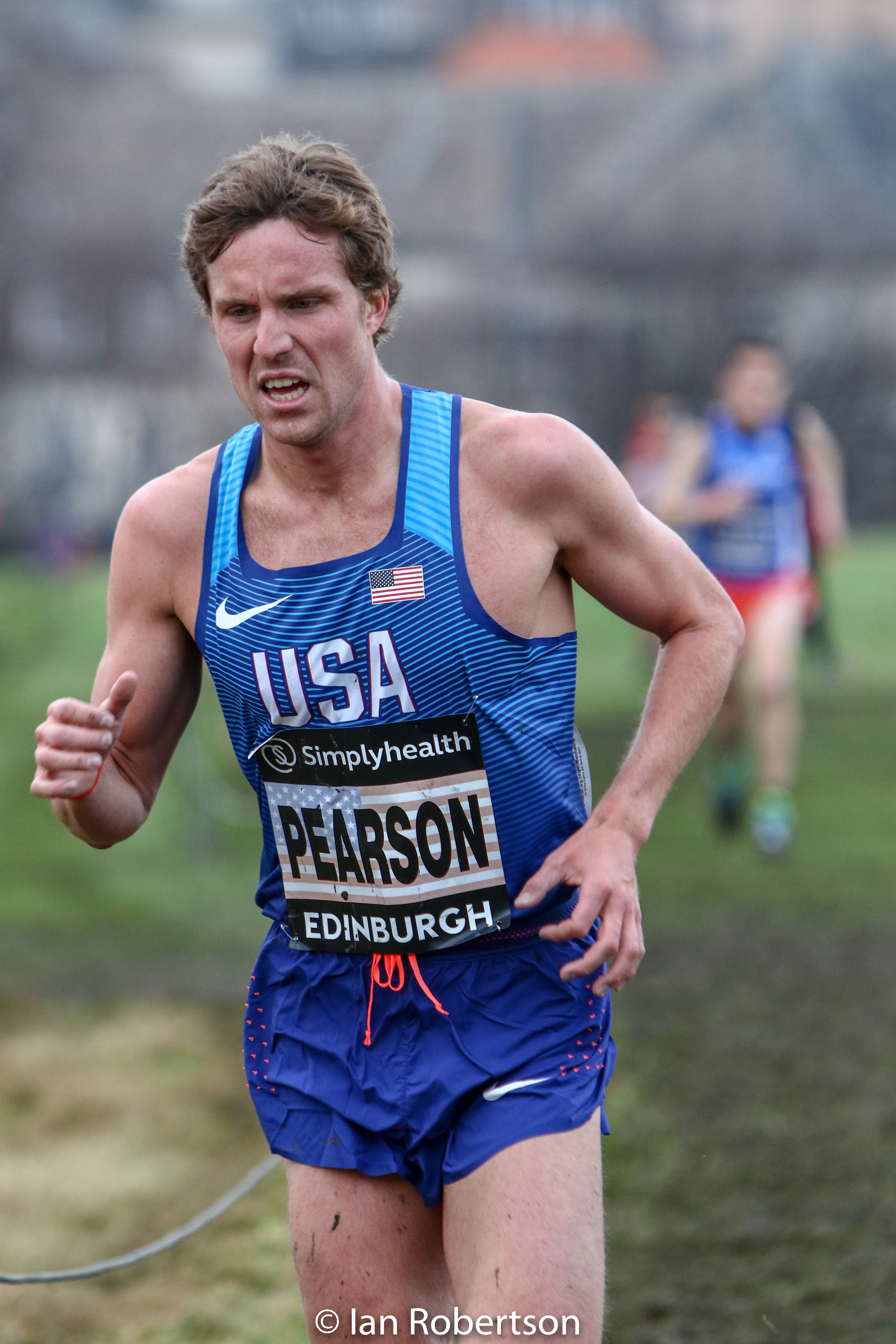
- Pearson in 2018

Personal information
- Born: September 22, 1993 (age 32) New Vernon, New Jersey, United States
- Education: University of Colorado
- Height: 5 ft 11 in (180 cm)

Sport
- Country: United States
- Sport: Triathlon
- College team: Colorado Buffaloes
- Coached by: Dean Golich

Achievements and titles
- Personal best: 5000 m: 13:32 (2016)
Medal record
Men's triathlon
Representing the United States
Olympic Games
Silver medal – second place	2020 Tokyo	Mixed relay
Silver medal – second place	2024 Paris	Mixed relay

Morgan Cadwell Pearson (born September 22, 1993) is an American professional triathlete who won silver medals in the mixed relay at the 2020 and 2024 Summer Olympics.

== Early life ==
Raised in the New Vernon section of Harding Township, New Jersey, Pearson began running competitively as a student at Delbarton School. He is the son of former Valeant Pharmaceuticals CEO J. Michael Pearson.

Pearson competed in cross-country and track and field, and ran collegiately for the University of Colorado, where he was a seven-time All-American. He currently resides and trains in Boulder, Colorado.

== Career ==
He won a bronze medal at the 2021 World Triathlon Championship Series Yokohama and a silver at Leeds, which allowed him to qualify for the 2020 Summer Olympics.

At the Olympic Games Men's Triathlon, with the start moved to 6:30 a.m. because of heat, Morgan had to wait 15 seconds in the Penalty area for an infraction incurred at Transition 1. Morgan finished 42nd overall, 7 minutes 1 second behind the winner.

At the 2024 Olympic Games Men's Triathlon, Morgan finished 31st. At the mixed relay, he won a silver medal.
