= Rico Bogen =

German triathlete (born 2000)

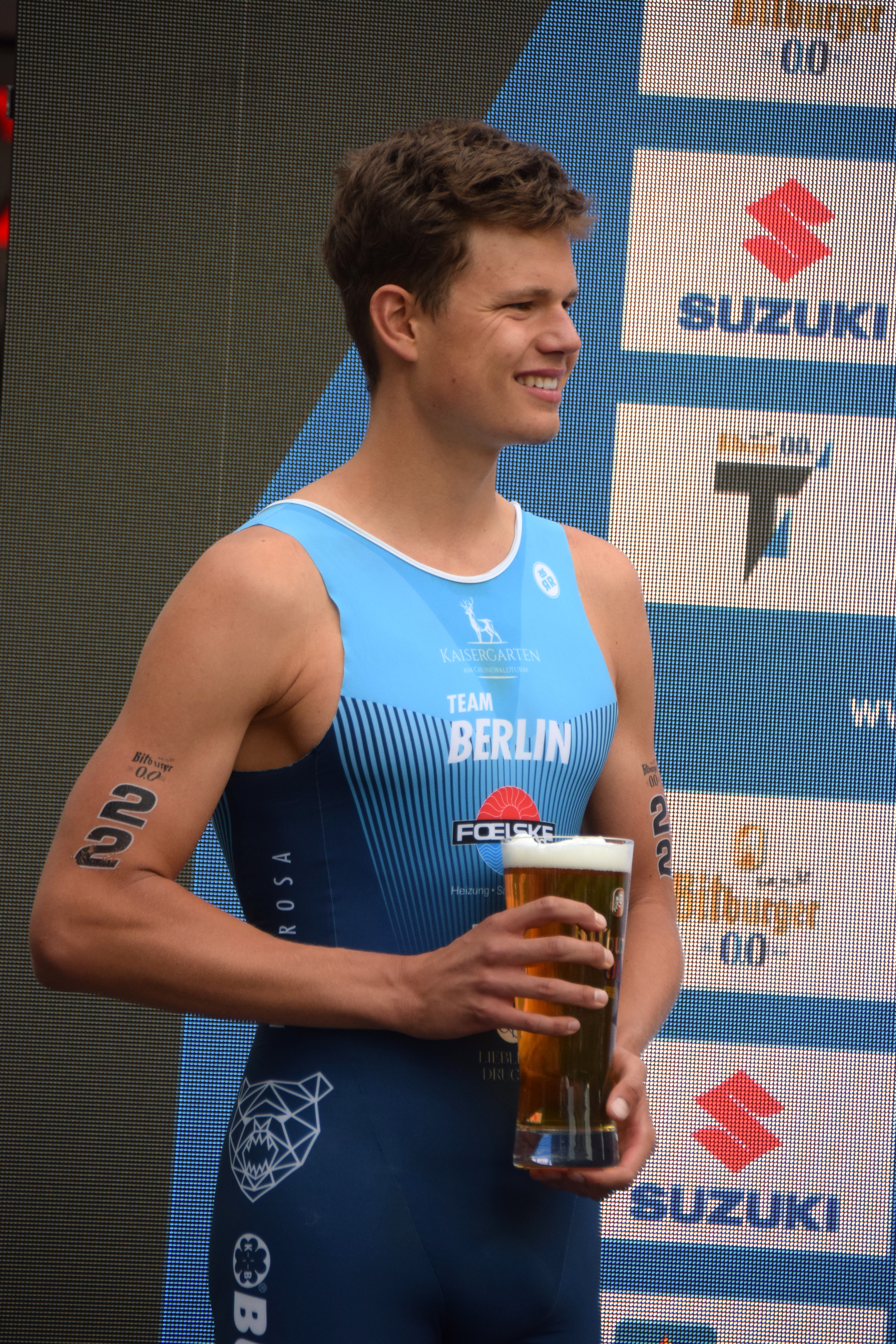

Personal information
- Born: 24 September 2000 (age 25) Leipzig, Germany
- Website: www.die-bogens.de

Sport
- Country: Germany
- Sport: Triathlon
- Club: SV Halle Triathlon
Medal record
Representing Germany
Men's triathlon
Ironman 70.3 World Championships
Gold medal – first place	2023 Lahti	Elite

Rico Bogen (born 24 September 2000) is a German professional triathlete. He won the 2023 Ironman 70.3 World Championships, making him the youngest ever winner of the event. He also won the Ironman 70.3 Kraichgau race the same year.
