= Julie Derron =

Swiss triathlete (born 1996)

- Derron in 2022

Personal information
- Nationality: Swiss
- Born: 10 September 1996 (age 30) Zurich, Switzerland

Sport
- Sport: Triathlon
Medal record
Women's triathlon
Representing Switzerland
Olympic Games
Silver medal – second place	2024 Paris	Individual
World Championships
Silver medal – second place	2024 Hamburg	Mixed relay
Bronze medal – third place	2023 Hamburg	Mixed relay
European Championships
Gold medal – first place	2021 Valencia	Individual
Bronze medal – third place	2022 Munich	Mixed relay
Ironman World Championship
Bronze medal – third place	2026 Hawaii, USA	Individual

Julie Derron (born 10 September 1996) is a Swiss triathlete. She was a silver medalist at the 2024 Summer Olympics and placed third at the Ironman World Championship in 2026.

She won the 2021 European Triathlon Championships. She was a bronze medalist in the mixed relay at the 2022 European Triathlon Championships, and a silver medalist in 2024 and a bronze medalist in 2023 at the World Triathlon Mixed Relay Championships.

== Career ==
She won the Alpe d'Huez Triathlon in 2017. She won the Europe Triathlon Sprint Championships in 2019 in Kazan.

She won the 2021 European Triathlon Championships in Valencia, Spain. She won a bronze medal in the mixed relay at the 2022 European Triathlon Championships in Munich, Germany.

In 2023, she was a bronze medalist at the World Triathlon Mixed Relay Championships in the mixed relay in Hamburg.

In 2024, she won victory at the Chengdu World Cup. In June 2024, she improved the course record at the Challenge Walchsee-Kaiserwinkl. In July 2024, she was a silver medalist at the World Triathlon Mixed Relay Championships.

Competing at the 2024 Summer Olympics in Paris, she won the silver medal in the women's triathlon on 31 July 2024. Derron was one of the flag-bearers for Switzerland at the closing ceremony alongside swimmer Roman Mityukov.

In July 2025, she won the Ironman Vitoria-Gasteiz in the Basque Country in only her second full-distance event, and her first since 2022.

In October 2026, Derron finished third at the 2026 women's Ironman World Championship, achieving a podium on her Kona debut, despite a three-minute drafting penalty.

== Personal life ==
From Zurich, her grandfather was a Swiss champion swimmer. Her sisters Nina and Michelle also compete in triathlon.
