= 2017 ITU World Triathlon Series =

- League: ITU World Triathlon Series
- Sport: Triathlon

Men's Series
- Series Champion: Mario Mola (ESP)
- Points: 4728

Women's Series
- Series Champion: Flora Duffy (BER)
- Points: 5200

World Triathlon Series seasons
- 2016 2018

The 2017 ITU World Triathlon Series was a series of nine World Championship Triathlon events that lead up to a Grand Final held in Rotterdam. The Series was organised under the auspices of the world governing body of triathlon, the International Triathlon Union (ITU).

== Calendar ==
Date	Location	Type
March 3–4	(United Arab Emirates) Abu Dhabi	Standard
April 8–9	(Australia) Gold Coast	Sprint
May 13–14	(Japan) Yokohama	Standard
June 10–11	(United Kingdom) Leeds	Standard
July 15–16	(Germany) Hamburg	Sprint
July 28–29	(Canada) Edmonton	Sprint
August 5–6	(Canada) Montreal	Standard
August 26–27	(Sweden) Stockholm	Standard
September 14–17	(Netherlands) Rotterdam	Grand Final

== Results ==
=== Medal summary ===
==== Men ====
Event	Gold	Silver	Bronze
Abu Dhabi	Javier Gómez (ESP)	Thomas Bishop (GBR)	Vincent Luis (FRA)
Gold Coast	Mario Mola (ESP)	Richard Murray (RSA)	Fernando Alarza (ESP)
Yokohama	Mario Mola (ESP)	Fernando Alarza (ESP)	Kristian Blummenfelt (NOR)
Leeds	Alistair Brownlee (GBR)	Jonathan Brownlee (GBR)	Fernando Alarza (ESP)
Hamburg	Mario Mola (ESP)	Jacob Birtwhistle (AUS)	Ryan Sissons (NZL)
Edmonton	Mario Mola (ESP)	Jacob Birtwhistle (AUS)	Richard Murray (RSA)
Montreal	Javier Gómez (ESP)	Kristian Blummenfelt (NOR)	Richard Murray (RSA)
Stockholm	Jonathan Brownlee (GBR)	Kristian Blummenfelt (NOR)	Pierre Le Corre (FRA)
Rotterdam	Vincent Luis (FRA)	Kristian Blummenfelt (NOR)	Mario Mola (ESP)

==== Women ====
Event	Gold	Silver	Bronze
Abu Dhabi	Andrea Hewitt (NZL)	Jodie Stimpson (GBR)	Sara Vilic (AUT)
Gold Coast	Andrea Hewitt (NZL)	Ashleigh Gentle (AUS)	Juri Ide (JPN)
Yokohama	Flora Duffy (BER)	Katie Zaferes (USA)	Kirsten Kasper (USA)
Leeds	Flora Duffy (BER)	Taylor Spivey (USA)	Alice Betto (ITA)
Hamburg	Flora Duffy (BER)	Ashleigh Gentle (AUS)	Laura Lindemann (GER)
Edmonton	Flora Duffy (BER)	Taylor Knibb (USA)	Katie Zaferes (USA)
Montreal	Ashleigh Gentle (AUS)	Flora Duffy (BER)	Andrea Hewitt (NZL)
Stockholm	Flora Duffy (BER)	Jessica Learmonth (GBR)	Ashleigh Gentle (AUS)
Rotterdam	Flora Duffy (BER)	Katie Zaferes (USA)	Jessica Learmonth (GBR)

== Overall standings ==
The athlete who accumulates the most points throughout the 8 race season is declared the year's world champion. The final point standings are:

=== Men ===
Rank	Athlete	Points
Gold medal	Mario Mola (ESP)	4728
Silver medal	Javier Gómez (ESP)	4311
Bronze medal	Kristian Blummenfelt (NOR)	4281
4	Richard Murray (RSA)	4010
5	Fernando Alarza (ESP)	3722
6	Jonathan Brownlee (GBR)	3685
7	Thomas Bishop (GBR)	3141
8	Vincent Luis (FRA)	3083
9	Pierre Le Corre (FRA)	2894
10	Ryan Sissons (NZL)	2799

=== Women ===
Rank	Athlete	Points
Gold medal	Flora Duffy (BER)	5200
Silver medal	Ashleigh Gentle (AUS)	4320
Bronze medal	Katie Zaferes (USA)	4302
4	Kirsten Kasper (USA)	3819
5	Andrea Hewitt (NZL)	3774
6	Jessica Learmonth (GBR)	3281
7	Joanna Brown (CAN)	3181
8	Rachel Klamer (NED)	3103
9	Jolanda Annen (SUI)	2748
10	Summer Cook (USA)	2554
