= 2018 ITU World Triathlon Series =

- League: ITU World Triathlon Series
- Sport: Triathlon

Men's Series
- Series Champion: Mario Mola (ESP)
- Points: 6081

Women's Series
- Series Champion: Vicky Holland (GBR)
- Points: 5540

World Triathlon Series seasons
- 2017 2019

The 2018 ITU World Triathlon Series was the 10th season of the World Triathlon Series, the top-level international series for triathlon, since its establishment in 2009. The season consisted of nine pairs of triathlon races for both a men's and women's competition, as well as three mixed relays, beginning on 2 March in Abu Dhabi, and concluding on 16 September with the grand final at the Gold Coast.

Mario Mola and Flora Duffy began the season as defending champions from the 2017 season. Mola would go on to defend his title and win the men's series for the third time in as many years, becoming the second-most successful triathlete at the world triathlon series after fellow countryman Javier Gómez.

Duffy's season however would be plagued by injuries, leading to an inability to defend her title despite winning two races early in the season. The eventual winner, Vicky Holland, captured the women's series by moving into first place only after the final race of the series. The most notable event of the year was in Bermuda where the Norwegian team completed the first men's podium sweep, with race winner Casper Stornes having only competed in two prior WTS races.

== Overview ==
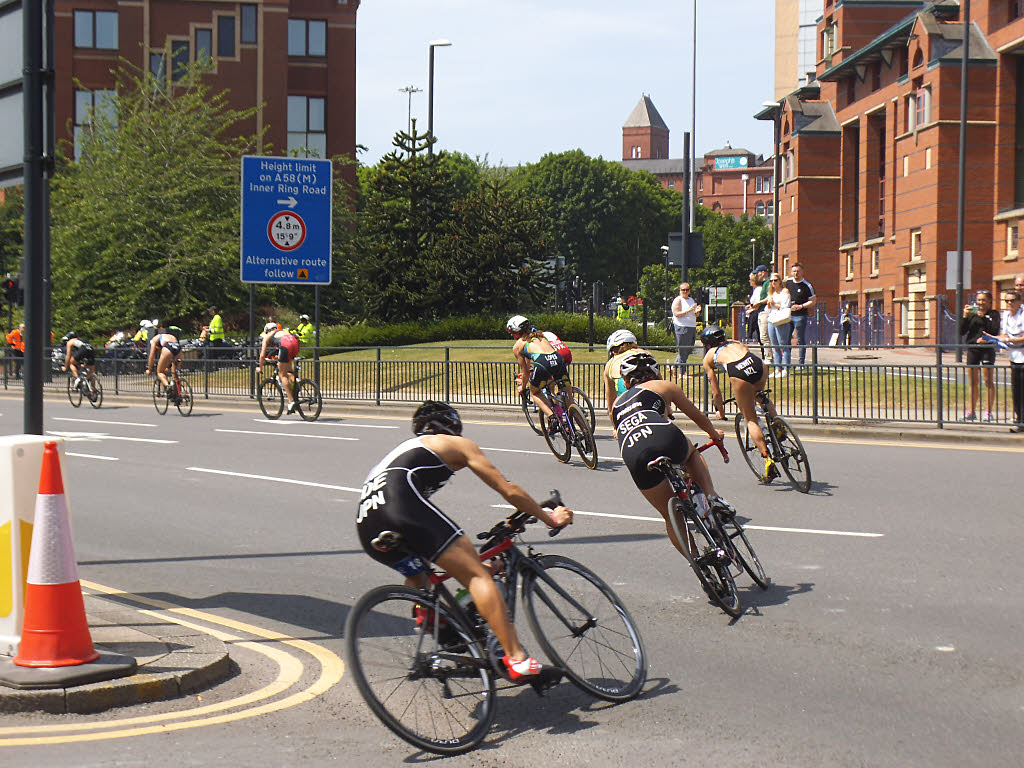
The ITU World Triathlon in Leeds.

=== Calendar ===
The 2018 ITU World Triathlon Series visited nine cities, and incorporated the three events of the inaugural Mixed Relay Series in Nottingham, Edmonton, and the Mixed Relay world championship in Hamburg.

Date	Location	Type
March 2–3	(United Arab Emirates) Abu Dhabi	Sprint
April 28–29	Hamilton, Bermuda	Standard
May 12–13	(Japan) Yokohama	Standard
June 7	(United Kingdom) Nottingham	Mixed relay
June 9–10	(United Kingdom) Leeds	Standard
July 14–15	(Germany) Hamburg	Sprint/Mixed relay
July 27–29	(Canada) Edmonton	Sprint/Mixed relay
August 25–26	(Canada) Montreal	Standard
September 12–16	(Australia) Gold Coast	Grand Final

=== Point System ===
For every race a triathlete finished, they received points based on their position across the line. For a normal world series event, first place was awarded 1,000 points and every subsequent place was awarded 7.5% less, for the first forty triathletes; for the grand final, 1,200 points were awarded, once again decreasing by 7.5% for each place, but this time awarded down to 50th. However, if a triathlete finished outside the time cut (more than 5% longer than the winner's time for men, 8% for women), they received no points even if they finished in a scoring position. A triathlete's final score was the sum of their points from the grand final and their best five race scores of that year.

== Results ==
=== Medal summary ===
==== Men ====
Event	Gold	Silver	Bronze
Abu Dhabi	Henri Schoeman (RSA)	Mario Mola (ESP)	Vincent Luis (FRA)
Bermuda	Casper Stornes (NOR)	Kristian Blummenfelt (NOR)	Gustav Iden (NOR)
Yokohama	Mario Mola (ESP)	Jacob Birtwhistle (AUS)	Fernando Alarza (ESP)
Leeds	Richard Murray (RSA)	Mario Mola (ESP)	Vincent Luis (FRA)
Hamburg	Mario Mola (ESP)	Vincent Luis (FRA)	Richard Murray (RSA)
Edmonton	Mario Mola (ESP)	Kristian Blummenfelt (NOR)	Jacob Birtwhistle (AUS)
Montreal	Mario Mola (ESP)	Kristian Blummenfelt (NOR)	Jacob Birtwhistle (AUS)
Gold Coast	Vincent Luis (FRA)	Mario Mola (ESP)	Richard Murray (RSA)
Overall	Mario Mola (ESP)	Vincent Luis (FRA)	Jacob Birtwhistle (AUS)

==== Women ====
Event	Gold	Silver	Bronze
Abu Dhabi	Rachel Klamer (NED)	Jessica Learmonth (GBR)	Natalie Van Coevorden (AUS)
Bermuda	Flora Duffy (BER)	Vicky Holland (GBR)	Katie Zaferes (USA)
Yokohama	Flora Duffy (BER)	Katie Zaferes (USA)	Non Stanford (GBR)
Leeds	Vicky Holland (GBR)	Georgia Taylor-Brown (GBR)	Katie Zaferes (USA)
Hamburg	Cassandre Beaugrand (FRA)	Laura Lindemann (GER)	Katie Zaferes (USA)
Edmonton	Vicky Holland (GBR)	Ashleigh Gentle (AUS)	Georgia Taylor-Brown (GBR)
Montreal	Vicky Holland (GBR)	Katie Zaferes (USA)	Georgia Taylor-Brown (GBR)
Gold Coast	Ashleigh Gentle (AUS)	Vicky Holland (GBR)	Katie Zaferes (USA)
Overall	Vicky Holland (GBR)	Katie Zaferes (USA)	Georgia Taylor-Brown (GBR)

==== Mixed relay ====
Event	Gold	Silver	Bronze
Nottingham	United States; Kirsten Kasper; Eli Hemming; Katie Zaferes; Matthew McElroy	Great Britain; Non Stanford; Tom Bishop; Vicky Holland; Jonny Brownlee	France; Cassandre Beaugrand; Pierre Le Corre; Mathilde Gautier; Léo Bergère
Hamburg	France; Leonie Periault; Dorian Coninx; Cassandre Beaugrand; Vincent Luis	Australia; Natalie Van Coevorden; Aaron Royle; Ashleigh Gentle; Jacob Birtwhistle	United States; Kirsten Kasper; Ben Kanute; Katie Zaferes; Kevin McDowell
Edmonton	Australia; Natalie Van Coevorden; Aaron Royle; Ashleigh Gentle; Jacob Birtwhistle	United States; Taylor Spivey; Seth Rider; Kirsten Kasper; Matthew McElroy	New Zealand; Andrea Hewitt; Tayler Reid; Nicole Van Der Kaay; Hayden Wilde

== Overall standings ==
The athlete who accumulates the most points throughout the season is declared the year's world champion. The final point standings are:

=== Men ===
Rank	Athlete	Points
Gold medal	Mario Mola (ESP)	6081
Silver medal	Vincent Luis (FRA)	5060
Bronze medal	Jacob Birtwhistle (AUS)	4884
4	Richard Murray (RSA)	4792
5	Kristian Blummenfelt (NOR)	3936
6	Fernando Alarza (ESP)	3520
7	Henri Schoeman (RSA)	3438
8	Pierre Le Corre (FRA)	3215
9	Tyler Mislawchuk (CAN)	3194
10	Marten Van Riel (BEL)	2960

=== Women ===
Rank	Athlete	Points
Gold medal	Vicky Holland (GBR)	5540
Silver medal	Katie Zaferes (USA)	5488
Bronze medal	Georgia Taylor-Brown (GBR)	4183
4	Kirsten Kasper (USA)	3887
5	Jessica Learmonth (GBR)	3810
6	Ashleigh Gentle (AUS)	3750
7	Jodie Stimpson (GBR)	3658
8	Taylor Spivey (USA)	3603
9	Laura Lindemann (GER)	3423
10	Rachel Klamer (NED)	3306
