= Supertri =

International short-course triathlon

Supertri is an international short-course triathlon organisation that stages festival-style mass participation triathlons at city-centre and landmark venues across North America and Europe. Its events are open to athletes of all abilities, from first-timers to experienced triathletes, with SuperSprint, Sprint and Olympic distance races. Since 2026, selected events have also hosted races in the Supertri Pro Series for professional athletes, which ends with a standalone Pro Series Final.

== History ==
Michael D'hulst met Chris McCormack while running the Challenge Taiwan event, and the pair struck up a friendship and often discussed their shared passion for elevating the sport. As they worked together on multiple projects in Asia, they started to refine the concept behind what was to be christened as Super League Triathlon.

An encounter with Leonid Boguslavsky, who had been inspired to take up the sport at the age 62 after reading McCormack's book 'I'm Here To Win', led to a meeting at a hotel in London, and the three decided to launch a one-off test event to see whether their concept that professional triathlon could be an inspirational spectator sport could be achieved.

They held the test event on Hamilton Island, and it was a success, leading them to grow the concept into an annual series, initially known as the Championship Series, Supertri League and then Supertri Pro Series. D'hulst took on the role as the permanent CEO of the company.

The key differentiators of its professional league were its is its short formats, tight broadcast times, stadium-like courses with technical elements often missing from triathlon racing, and a closed league.

The Championship Series quickly grew, with 3 events per Series in 2018 and 2019 before COVID.

In 2019, the business moved its headquarters from Singapore to London.

The spread of COVID and the associated lockdowns saw the cancellation of sports events worldwide. D'hulst, Boguslavsky and McCormack opted against hibernating the business and created an indoor Esports racing series that could be run with social distancing rules in place.

Arena Games Triathlon, later renamed Supertri E, debuted in Rotterdam in 2020 and became a core part of the business until its World Championship was paused in 2026.

By 2021 and the end of lockdowns, the indoor Esports series and the Championship Series grew to seven events, and to eight in 2022.

Super League Triathlon acquired the Malibu Triathlon in 2020. At that stage the theory was to trial a participation offering while also acquiring an established US base for a Super League professional event. After three events in Malibu local permitting laws saw the event change operator, but the concept of expanding mass participation focussed on short and accessible race formats had been proven.

In 2023, the company acquired Chicago Triathlon, New York City Triathlon, and established the Long Beach Legacy Triathlon. It went on to acquire Austin Triathlon and Kerrville Triathlon in 2024, and announced the acquisitions of Toronto Triathlon Festival, Blenheim Palace Triathlon and New Jersey State Triathlon in 2025, while also launching the Toulouse Triathlon alongside the established professional Supertri League event in the city.

In February 2024, Super League Triathlon rebranded as Supertri. In February 2025, it launched By Supertri as a separate brand for its mass participation events. From 2026, its events were renamed under the single Supertri brand, for example Supertri Chicago and Supertri Blenheim Palace. In September 2026, Supertri acquired the Brighton & Hove Triathlon, which will be held as Supertri Brighton from 2027.

In late 2025, Supertri announced a significant strategic shift for 2026, moving to a unified festival model in which elite professional racing is integrated into select mass participation events rather than operating as a separate entity. Under the new structure, professional athletes compete in a Supertri Pro Series race within selected Supertri mass participation events, racing the same sprint-distance, draft-legal courses as age-group participants. The leading professionals qualify through these events for a standalone Supertri Pro Series Final. As part of the restructuring, Supertri paused its Supertri E World Championship in 2026, following the International Olympic Committee's decision to cancel its planned Esports Games.

== Supertri events ==
By 2026, Supertri's mass participation expansion meant they owned two of the five largest short-course triathlons in the world by participant numbers: Supertri Chicago and Supertri Blenheim Palace.

Supertri's events are designed as festival-style experiences at city centre or landmark venues, offering SuperSprint, Sprint and Olympic distance races, for individuals and relay teams, to cater for athletes of all abilities. The three-stage Supertri format (300 m swim, 4 km bike and 1.6 km run, raced three times in a row) is used only for professional racing. From 2026, selected events also host a Supertri Pro Series race, integrating elite professional competition within the mass participation festival.

Supertri operates a First-Timer Programme across its event portfolio, offering participants 12 weeks of free personalised training in partnership with training platform TriDot, live online coaching sessions, dedicated race-day support, and first-timer-specific swim starts and transition areas. In 2025, 41% of Supertri race entrants were competing in their first triathlon event. Supertri set a target of welcoming 10,000 new participants into the sport in 2026.

Supertri also operates an Ambassador Programme, through which community leaders run local training sessions, clubs and meetups to introduce new participants to triathlon and build local Supertri communities. A Corporate Challenge programme enables companies to enter relay and individual teams at selected events, with fundraising components supporting partner charities. The Corporate Challenge at Supertri Long Beach has raised more than $20 million for paediatric cancer research at Children's Hospital Los Angeles.

From 2026, Supertri introduced a Global Rankings system in partnership with TriDot, enabling athletes to compare their performance across events in the portfolio using an algorithm that normalises results for course, weather and conditions.

=== Event portfolio ===
==== North America ====
Supertri Chicago (formerly the Chicago Triathlon)

Held on the shores of Lake Michigan, Chicago Triathlon is the largest triathlon in North America. The course features a swim in Monroe Harbor, a bike route through the city centre, and a run past landmarks including Buckingham Fountain and Soldier Field. Race formats include SuperSprint, Sprint and Olympic distances, as well as an Enduro challenge combining all three distances across a single weekend. The event raises funds for paediatric cancer research at Lurie Children's Hospital of Chicago.

Supertri Long Beach (formerly the Long Beach Legacy Triathlon)

Long Beach Legacy Triathlon is set on the Southern California coastline and features a protected bay swim. It is described as the world's largest fundraising triathlon. Race options include Sprint and Olympic distances for individuals and relay teams, a Corporate Challenge, and a Kids Splash and Dash. The event has raised more than $20 million for Children's Hospital Los Angeles.

Supertri Austin (formerly the CapTex Triathlon)

The largest short-endurance triathlon in Texas with a 30-year history, Austin Triathlon takes place in downtown Austin around Memorial Day in May. The multi-lap course passes the Texas State Capitol. From 2026, the event hosts a Supertri Pro Series race.

Supertri Kerrville (formerly the Kerrville Triathlon)

Held in the Texas Hill Country, Kerrville Triathlon takes place along the Guadalupe River. First held in 2011, it was cancelled in 2025 and 2026 because of flooding in the Kerrville area.

Supertri Toronto (formerly the Toronto Triathlon Festival)

First held in 2012, Toronto Triathlon takes place in the heart of Toronto. The course includes a swim at Ontario Place, a bike leg on downtown highways, and a run along Lake Shore. From 2026, the event hosts a Supertri Pro Series race.

Supertri New Jersey (formerly the New Jersey State Triathlon)

Held at Mercer County Park, New Jersey State Triathlon is known for its flat, fast course. The event celebrated its 20th anniversary in 2026, the first year under Supertri management. Race formats include Sprint and Olympic distances.

==== Europe ====
Supertri Blenheim Palace (formerly the Blenheim Palace Triathlon)

The largest triathlon in the United Kingdom, Blenheim Palace Triathlon has been staged for over two decades at Blenheim Palace, the UNESCO World Heritage Site and birthplace of Sir Winston Churchill. Race formats include Sprint, Super Sprint and Relay, as well as the Weekend Warrior Challenge, in which athletes complete as many triathlons as possible across the event weekend. 2026 is the first year under Supertri management, and the event hosts a Supertri Pro Series race.

Supertri Brighton

Staged along Hove Lawns and the Brighton seafront, the Brighton & Hove Triathlon was acquired by Supertri in 2026 and will be held as Supertri Brighton from 2027, the company's second event in the United Kingdom.

Supertri Toulouse

Supertri Toulouse (formerly the Toulouse Triathlon) is a mass participation event open to amateur athletes. Held in the centre of Toulouse, France, the course includes a swim at Port de la Daurade, a technically demanding bike segment featuring cobblestones and climbs, and a run along the city's riverfront. The event raises funds for cancer research at the ICUT – Oncopole Toulouse.

== Supertri Pro Series ==
=== 2026 Pro Series ===
From 2026, Supertri restructured its professional racing as the Supertri Pro Series. Rather than a standalone closed league, elite racing is embedded within mass participation festival events, with professional athletes competing on the same sprint-distance, draft-legal courses as amateur participants. This integration is designed to bring professional and amateur athletes closer together and increase the visibility of elite racing within the broader triathlon community.

The 2026 Pro Series consisted of three qualifying events and a season-ending Supertri Pro Series Final. The qualifying events were Ascension Seton Supertri Austin (Texas, 25 May 2026), Supertri Blenheim Palace (United Kingdom, 7 June 2026), and Supertri Toronto (Canada, 26 July 2026). Each event awarded three direct qualifying places per gender for the Final. The Final was held in Jersey on 6 September 2026 and was won by Matthew Hauser and Cassandre Beaugrand.

The Pro Series Final was contested over Supertri's signature format — multiple back-to-back stages of swim, bike and run with elimination and the Short Chute mechanic — and carried a prize purse of more than US$800,000, with each gender winner earning US$100,000, described by Supertri as the largest single-day prize purse in triathlon. All Pro Series events pay prize money ten places deep.

A central athlete roster is recruited by Supertri for each season. Throughout its history, Supertri has featured Olympic and World champions including Paris 2024 Olympic gold medallists Cassandre Beaugrand and Alex Yee, as well as Hayden Wilde, Georgia Taylor-Brown and Jonathan Brownlee. Beaugrand competed in six seasons of Supertri before her 2024 Olympic victory; Yee was first given a place in the competition aged 19.

== Supertri Championship Series / League era (2017-2025) ==
The Supertri League/Championship season which was held up to and including 2025, traditionally ran between August and November. Over the course of the season, Rounds were held at locations around the world. There were Women's, Men's and Teams Supertri League champions each year.

Being a closed League, only athletes who had a contract for the current season competed. Athletes were recruited either by the League or by the Teams where franchises were owned, aiming for a blend of the world's best and most high-profile athletes and up and coming stars of the future.

Triathlon has traditionally been an individual sport but Supertri introduced Teams. Athletes raced together and accumulated points as a team, with different stages to win points and a redistribution of prize money of all athletes who contribute and are supported.

After its early trial years, Supertri opened franchises up to potential ownership in 2024, with would-be owners vetted to ensure they will bring value to growing the League and the sport. Two initial franchises were acquired by Brownlee Racing, led by Jonathan Brownlee and Alistair Brownlee, and Podium Racing, led by John Anthony and managed by Tim Don.

The Teams all had managers who oversaw the athletes and made tactical decisions during the racing. In 2024, Brownlee Racing was managed by Non Stanford, Crown Racing by Chris McCormack, Podium Racing by Tim Don, and Stars & Stripes Racing by Parker Spencer.

Supertri League courses were built on 1-mile loops to give multiple spectator and broadcast angles. This also reduced disruption for hosts, avoiding the widespread road closures associated with endurance events, and made city-centre locations possible. Each course was different, from cobbles and lakes to seas and open desert.

Supertri League was raced over the Supertri format, which is three back-to-back rounds of swim, bike and run with no breaks. The distances for each discipline are 300m swim, 4 km bike and 1.6 km run. The format places an emphasis on athletes being able to produce both speed and endurance, as well as on transitions with eight required during the course of a race, rather than two in a traditional triathlon.

Over the years Supertri has also used other formats, including the Triple Mix, Eliminator and Equalizer, but in 2024 moved to standardise racing under the Supertri format, also used for the Supertri Pro Series Final.

=== Short Chute ===
The Short Chute is an opportunity for athletes to win a shortcut on the course. That has been used in both the individual and team racing format. In the Supertri format, there are three Short Chutes available. All are won during the first swim, bike and run legs and taken on the final run as follows:

- First across the Mount Line after the first swim
- First across the Mount Line after the first bike
- First across the Dismount Line after first run

=== Points ===
During each Round athletes were awarded points depending on where they finished in the race. The points were accumulated to crown the champions of the Women's and Men's Leagues at the end of the League season. In addition, there were separate discipline Leagues to recognise the fastest swim, bike and runners across the season.

Each athlete's individual points plus points any won by athletes in each discipline counted towards the overall Teams League to crown the Teams champions at the end of the season. In the case of a tie in the Leagues, the athlete or Team with the best result in the final race of the League finished ahead of the other athletes or Teams.

Place	1	2	3	4	5	6	7	8	9	10	11	12	13	14	15	16
Standard round points	15	14	13	12	11	10	9	8	7	6	5	4	3	2	1	0
Grand Final points	20	18	16	14	12	11	10	9	8	7	6	5	4	3	2	0

Discipline Leagues are awarded as follow:

- Swim: Points allocated at each Round based on time of the first or second swim discipline of the day measured at the swim exit.
- Bike: Points allocated at each Round based on time of the fastest lap measured from Mount to Dismount Line of the first or second bike discipline of the day.
- Run: Points allocated at each Round based on time of the fastest lap measured from Mount Line to Dismount Line of the first or second run discipline of the day

Place	1	2	3
Swim	4	2	1
Bike	4	2	1
Run	4	2	1

=== Elimination ===
Any athlete that falls 90 seconds behind the leader is eliminated from the race. This is implemented every lap, measured from the first athlete passing the Mount Line, executed at the Mount Line and prevents lapping.

== Supertri League champions ==
=== Men's League Champions ===
Year	First	Second	Third
2018	Vincent Luis (FRA)	Henri Schoeman (RSA)	Jonny Brownlee (GBR)
2019	Vincent Luis (FRA)	Hayden Wilde (NZL)	Pierre Le Corre (FRA)
2021	Alex Yee (GBR) (Eagles)	Hayden Wilde (NZL) (Sharks)	Jonny Brownlee (GBR) (Cheetahs)
2022	Hayden Wilde (NZL) (Sharks)	Matthew Hauser (AUS) (Eagles)	Jonny Brownlee (GBR) (Cheetahs)
2023	Léo Bergère (FRA) (Eagles)	Hayden Wilde (NZL) (Scorpions)	Alex Yee (GBR) (Sharks)
2024	Hayden Wilde (NZL) (Crown Racing)	Léo Bergère (FRA) (Podium Racing)	Tim Hellwig (GER) (Stars & Stripes Racing)
2025	Csongor Lehmann (HUN) (Stars & Stripes Racing)	Vasco Vilaça (POR) (Crown Racing)	Ricardo Batista (POR) (Crown Racing)

*There were two test events held in 2017 which were raced as one-offs. Hamilton Island: 1) Richard Murray, 2) Mario Mola, 3) Jake Birtwhistle. Jersey: 1) Kristian Blummenfelt, 2) Jonathan Brownlee, 3) Richard Murray.

=== Women's League Champions ===
Year	First	Second	Third
2018	Katie Zaferes (USA)	Rachel Klamer (NED)	Cassandre Beaugrand (FRA)
2019	Katie Zaferes (USA)	Rachel Klamer (NED)	Taylor Spivey (USA)
2021	Georgia Taylor-Brown (GBR) (Scorpions)	Jess Learmonth (GBR) (Eagles)	Katie Zaferes (USA) (Rhinos)
2022	Georgia Taylor-Brown (GBR) (Scorpions)	Taylor Spivey (USA) (Rhinos)	Sophie Coldwell (GBR) (Cheetahs)
2023	Kate Waugh (GBR) (Sharks)	Jeanne Lehair (LUX) (Eagles)	Emma Lombardi (FRA) (Eagles)
2024	Georgia Taylor-Brown (GBR) (Crown Racing)	Jeanne Lehair (LUX) (Podium Racing)	Cassandre Beaugrand (FRA) (Crown Racing)
2025	Jeanne Lehair (LUX) (Podium Racing)	Léonie Périault (FRA) (Podium Racing)	Georgia Taylor-Brown (GBR) (Crown Racing)

*There was one event held in 2017 which was raced as a one-off. Jersey: 1) Katie Zaferes, 2) Summer Cook, 3) Nicola Spirig.

=== Teams League Champions ===
Year	First	Second	Third
2021	SLT Eagles	SLT Sharks	SLT Scorpions
2022	SLT Scorpions	SLT Sharks	SLT Cheetahs
2023	SLT Eagles	SLT Scorpions	SLT Sharks
2024	Crown Racing	Podium Racing	Stars & Stripes Racing
2025	Podium Racing	Crown Racing	Brownlee Racing

== Supertri League individual race results ==
=== 2017 ===
==== Men ====
Event	First	Second	Third
Hamilton Island	Richard Murray (RSA)	Mario Mola (ESP)	Jacob Birtwhistle (AUS)
Jersey	Kristian Blummenfelt (NOR)	Jonathan Brownlee (GBR)	Richard Murray (RSA)

==== Women ====
Event	First	Second	Third
Jersey	Katie Zaferes (USA)	Summer Cook (USA)	Nicola Spirig (SUI)

=== 2018 ===
==== Men ====
Round	Race	First	Second	Third
Jersey	Triple Mix	Vincent Luis (FRA)	Henri Schoeman (RSA)	Kristian Blummenfelt (NOR)
Jersey	Enduro	Vincent Luis (FRA)	Henri Schoeman (RSA)	Richard Murray (RSA)
Jersey	Overall	Vincent Luis (FRA)	Henri Schoeman (RSA)	Kristian Blummenfelt (NOR)
Malta	Eliminator	Richard Murray (RSA)	Vincent Luis (FRA)	Henri Schoeman (RSA)
Malta	Equalizer	Vincent Luis (FRA)	Henri Schoeman (RSA)	Tyler Mislawchuk (CAN)
Malta	Overall	Vincent Luis (FRA)	Henri Schoeman (RSA)	Richard Murray (RSA)
Mallorca	Triple Mix	Henri Schoeman (RSA)	Vincent Luis (FRA)	Jonathan Brownlee (GBR)
Mallorca	Sprint Enduro	Vincent Luis (FRA)	Jonathan Brownlee (GBR)	Henri Schoeman (RSA)
Mallorca	Overall	Vincent Luis (FRA)	Henri Schoeman (RSA)	Jonathan Brownlee (GBR)
Singapore	Eliminator	Jonathan Brownlee (GBR)	Tyler Mislawchuk (CAN)	Hayden Wilde (NZ)
Singapore	Enduro	Vincent Luis (FRA)	Jonathan Brownlee (GBR)	Henri Schoeman (RSA)
Singapore	Overall	Jonathan Brownlee (GBR)	Henri Schoeman (RSA)	Tyler Mislawchuk (CAN)

==== Women ====
Round	Race	First	Second	Third
Jersey	Triple Mix	Cassandre Beaugrand (FRA)	Katie Zaferes (USA)	Ashleigh Gentle (AUS)
Jersey	Enduro	Katie Zaferes (USA)	Kirsten Kasper (USA)	Cassandre Beaugrand (FRA)
Jersey	Overall	Katie Zaferes (USA)	Cassandre Beaugrand (FRA)	Kirsten Kasper (USA)
Malta	Eliminator	Katie Zaferes (USA)	Rachel Klamer (NED)	Joanna Brown (CAN)
Malta	Equalizer	Katie Zaferes (USA)	Kirsten Kasper (USA)	Summer Cook (USA)
Malta	Overall	Katie Zaferes (USA)	Rachel Klamer (NED)	Kirsten Kasper (USA)
Mallorca	Triple Mix	Katie Zaferes (USA)	Taylor Spivey (USA)	Kirsten Kasper (USA)
Mallorca	Sprint Enduro	Taylor Spivey (USA)	Kirsten Kasper (USA)	Katie Zaferes (USA)
Mallorca	Overall	Taylor Spivey (USA)	Katie Zaferes (USA)	Kirsten Kasper (USA)
Singapore	Eliminator	Katie Zaferes (USA)	Cassandre Beaugrand (FRA)	Ashleigh Gentle (AUS)
Singapore	Enduro	Cassandre Beaugrand (FRA)	Katie Zaferes (USA)	Rachel Klamer (NED)
Singapore	Overall	Cassandre Beaugrand (FRA)	Katie Zaferes (USA)	Rachel Klamer (NED)

=== 2019 ===
==== Men ====
Round	Race	First	Second	Third
Jersey	Enduro*	Vincent Luis (FRA)	Pierre Le Corre (FRA)	Hayden Wilde (NZL)
Malta	Equaliser	Vincent Luis (FRA)	Kristian Blummenfelt (NOR)	Hayden Wilde (NZL)

*Due to extreme weather conditions the event took place as an aquathlon over 3 x swim and run

==== Women ====
Round	Race	First	Second	Third
Jersey	Triple Mix	Cassandre Beaugrand (FRA)	Katie Zaferes (USA)	Rachel Klamer (NED)
Malta	Equalizer	Katie Zaferes (USA)	Rachel Klamer (NED)	Yuko Takahashi (JPN)

*Due to extreme weather conditions the event took place as an aquathlon over 3 x swim and run

=== 2021 ===
==== Men ====
Round	Race	First	Second	Third
London	Triple Mix	Hayden Wilde (NZ)	Vincent Luis (FRA)	Jonathan Brownlee (GBR)
Munich	Equalizer	Vincent Luis (FRA)	Jonathan Brownlee (GBR)	Alex Yee (GBR)
Jersey	Enduro	Alex Yee (GBR)	Jonathan Brownlee (GBR)	Hayden Wilde (NZ)
Malibu	Eliminator	Alex Yee (GBR)	Marten Van Riel (BEL)	Vasco Vilaça (POR)

==== Women ====
Round	Race	First	Second	Third
London	Triple Mix	Jessica Learmonth (GBR)	Georgia Taylor-Brown (GBR)	Vicky Holland (GBR)
Munich	Equalizer	Jessica Learmonth (GBR)	Georgia Taylor-Brown (GBR)	Beth Potter (GBR)
Jersey	Enduro	Jessica Learmonth (GBR)	Georgia Taylor-Brown (GBR)	Cassandre Beaugrand (FRA)
Malibu	Eliminator	Flora Duffy (BER)	Georgia Taylor-Brown (GBR)	Katie Zaferes (USA)

==== Teams ====
Rank	Team	London	Munich	Jersey	Malibu	Total Points
C	Eagles	93	89	91	89	362
2	Scorpions	71	68	70	68	277
3	Sharks	66	63	58	71	258
4	Cheetahs	61	45	55	71	232
5	Rhinos	35	58	53	53	199

=== 2022 ===
==== Men ====
Round	Race	First	Second	Third
London	Triple Mix	Hayden Wilde (NZ)	Matthew Hauser (AUS)	Alex Yee (GBR)
Munich	Enduro	Matthew Hauser (AUS)	Vasco Vilaça (POR)	Hayden Wilde (NZ)
Malibu	Eliminator	Hayden Wilde (NZ)	Shachar Sagiv (ISR)	Vasco Vilaça (POR)
Toulouse	Triple Mix	Hayden Wilde (NZ)	Dorian Coninx (FRA)	Kenji Nener (JPN)
NEOM	Enduro	Matthew Hauser (AUS)	Jonathan Brownlee (GBR)	Hayden Wilde (NZL)

==== Women ====
Round	Race	First	Second	Third
London	Triple Mix	Cassandre Beaugrand (FRA)	Taylor Spivey (USA)	Georgia Taylor-Brown (GBR)
Munich	Enduro	Georgia Taylor-Brown (GBR)	Sophie Coldwell (GBR)	Taylor Spivey (USA)
Malibu	Eliminator	Taylor Spivey (USA)	Miriam Casillas (ESP)	Georgia Taylor-Brown (GBR)
Toulouse	Triple Mix	Georgia Taylor-Brown (GB)	Taylor Spivey (US)	Sophie Coldwell (GB)
NEOM	Enduro	Georgia Taylor-Brown (GB)	Sophie Coldwell (GB)	Beth Potter (GB)

==== Teams ====
Rank	Team	London	Munich	Toulouse	Malibu	NEOM	Total Points
C	Scorpions	100	64	45	74	102	385
2	Sharks	78	70	87	68	80	383
3	Cheetahs	50	75	91	48	94	358
4	Eagles	54	61	63	85	51	314
5	Rhinos	62	63	58	56	65	304

=== 2023* ===
==== Men ====
Round	First	Second	Third
London	Alex Yee (GBR)	Jonathan Brownlee (GBR)	Tayler Reid (NZ)
Toulouse	Léo Bergère (FRA)	Jonathan Brownlee (GBR)	Henri Schoeman (RSA)
Malibu	Hayden Wilde (NZ)	Léo Bergère (FRA)	Matthew Hauser (AUS)
NEOM	Léo Bergère (FRA)	Hayden Wilde (NZL)	Alex Yee (GBR)

==== Women ====
Round	First	Second	Third
London	Jeanne Lehair (LUX)	Sophie Coldwell (GBR)	Taylor Spivey (USA)
Toulouse	Kate Waugh (GBR)	Léonie Périault (FRA)	Emma Lombardi (FRA)
Malibu	Cassandre Beaugrand (FRA)	Emma Lombardi (FRA)	Jeanne Lehair (LUX)
NEOM	Cassandre Beaugrand (FRA)	Kate Waugh (GBR)	Jeanne Lehair (LUX)

*From 2023 onwards all races were over the Supertri format

==== Teams ====
Rank	Team	London	Toulouse	Malibu	NEOM	Total Points
C	Eagles	60	100	125	140	425
2	Scorpions	65	100	113	129	407
3	Sharks	148	82	82	94	390
4	Warriors	75	66	66	35	220

=== 2024 ===
==== Men ====
Round	First	Second	Third
Boston	Alex Yee (GBR)	Hayden Wilde (NZL)	Dorian Coninx (FRA)
Chicago	Hayden Wilde (NZL)	Léo Bergère (FRA)	Vasco Vilaça (POR)
London	Hayden Wilde (NZL)	Matthew Hauser (AUS)	Léo Bergère (FRA)
Toulouse	Vasco Vilaça (POR)	Tim Hellwig (GER)	Hayden Wilde (NZL)
NEOM	Alex Yee (GBR)	Hayden Wilde (NZL)	Léo Bergère (FRA)

==== Women ====
Round	First	Second	Third
Boston	Jeanne Lehair (LUX)	Georgia Taylor-Brown (GBR)	Kate Waugh (GBR)
Chicago	Georgia Taylor-Brown (GBR)	Cassandre Beaugrand (FRA)	Taylor Spivey (USA)
London	Georgia Taylor-Brown (GBR)	Cassandre Beaugrand (FRA)	Jeanne Lehair (LUX)
Toulouse	Georgia Taylor-Brown (GBR)	Taylor Spivey (USA)	Kate Waugh (GBR)
NEOM	Cassandre Beaugrand (FRA)	Jeanne Lehair (LUX)	Léonie Périault (FRA)

==== Teams ====
Rank	Team	Boston	Chicago	London	Toulouse	NEOM	Total Points
C	Crown Racing	81	79	88	75	97	420
2	Podium Racing	82	83	75	69	82	391
3	Stars & Stripes Racing	46	63	75	87	67	338
4	Brownlee Racing	73	57	45	51	86	312

=== 2025 ===
==== Men ====
Round	First	Second	Third
Toronto	Alex Yee (GBR)	Csongor Lehmann (HUN)	Vasco Vilaça (POR)
Chicago	Alberto González García (ESP)	Tyler Mislawchuk (CAN)	John Reed (USA)
Jersey	Csongor Lehmann (HUN)	Vasco Vilaça (POR)	Oliver Conway (GBR)
Toulouse	Csongor Lehmann (HUN)	Seth Rider (USA)	Vasco Vilaça (POR)

==== Women ====
Round	First	Second	Third
Toronto	Jolien Vermeylen (BEL)	Léonie Périault (FRA)	Cassandre Beaugrand (FRA)
Chicago	Jeanne Lehair (LUX)	Georgia Taylor-Brown (GBR)	Fanni Szalai (HUN)
Jersey	Jeanne Lehair (LUX)	Léonie Périault (FRA)	Georgia Taylor-Brown (GBR)
Toulouse	Jeanne Lehair (LUX)	Léonie Périault (FRA)	Jess Fullagar (GBR)

==== Teams ====
Rank	Team	Toronto	Chicago	Jersey	Toulouse	Total Points
C	Podium Racing	69	105	91	90	355
2	Crown Racing	89	77	59	76	301
3	Brownlee Racing	73	48	67	90	278
4	Stars & Stripes Racing	51	52	65	76	244

== Supertri League Hosts ==
Country	Location	Year								Total
Country	Location	2017	2018	2019	2021	2022	2023	2024	2025	
Australia	Hamilton Island	•								1
Jersey	Saint Helier	•	•	•	•				•	5
Singapore			•							1
Malta	Bormla		•	•						2
Spain	Mallorca, Porto Cristo		•							1
Great Britain	London				•	•	•	•		4
Germany	Munich				•	•				2
United States	Malibu, California				•	•	•			3
France	Toulouse					•	•	•	•	4
Saudi Arabia	Neom					•	•	•		3
United States	Boston							•		1
United States	Chicago							•	•	2
Canada	Toronto								•	1

== Supertri E (2020-2025) ==
=== Supertri E ===
Supertri E was a triathlon series that combined real-life and virtual racing, and was featured at the IOC's Olympic Esports Week. Its World Championship was paused in 2026.

The Supertri E World Triathlon Championship crowned official Esports triathlon World Champions. Athletes compete in arenas, swim in Olympic pools, and complete bike and run segments on smart trainers and self-powered curved treadmills.

In 2024, the World Championship took place at the London Aquatic Centre in Queen Elizabeth Olympic Park on April 13. British triathlete Beth Potter clinched the women's title and American athlete Chase McQueen secured the men's championship.

=== Supertri E History ===
Originally named Arena Games Triathlon, Supertri E was born in the COVID pandemic-era, when lockdowns and restrictions saw global sport forced to either adapt of shut down entirely. As a mass sport that required mass gatherings, triathlon was a sport heavily affected.

Supertri CEO Michael D'hulst had been speaking to technology platform Zwift about the idea of a hybrid real life and virtual event for some time, but the companies agreed to accelerate their development of the concept during the COVID lockdowns, and the concept was established.

Athletes would swim in an indoor pool, and could cycle and run at stations positioned far enough apart that they adhered to social distancing rules. The technology enabled a real race to happen and a global broadcast that was innovative and safe. The first Arena Games Triathlon took place in Rotterdam in 2020, and the event was so successful it won multiple awards and a new triathlon race format was created.

After several years of refining the concept, Supertri partnered with World Triathlon to create official Esports World Champions from the event, and to get it into the IOC's Olympic Esports Week. The event later ran as the Supertri E World Triathlon Championship, powered by MyWhoosh, with the aim of becoming a medal event at the IOC's planned Olympic Esports Games.

=== Supertri E Race Format ===
Supertri E blends real life racing and virtual racing. The swim portions of the race take place in an Olympic standard pool, while the bike and run sections take place on the pool deck or pool's surrounding area, utilizing static bikes and self propelled treadmills. The bike and run sections of the race are captured using cameras, capturing the athlete's reactions as the race unfolds, and through utilizing the training platform MyWhoosh. This includes athletes each having their own race avatar (so that spectators can see the athlete's positions, in relation to each other, on the route selected on Zwift) and real time displays of power output and heart rate data.

At Supertri E, each swim is 200 m, each bike is 4 km, and each run is 1 km. Supertri E events are competed over heats and a final. Heats see two stages of swim-bike-run, which determine which athletes proceed to the final. 10 athletes qualify for each event final. From 2025, the final is competed over the Supertri race format. This means 3 back to back stages of swim, bike, run. with minimal rest between each stage. Previous editions saw a pursuit style start adopted for the final stage, and the second stage taking the form reversed triathlon (run, bike, swim).

=== 2026 Pause ===
Supertri confirmed that the Supertri E World Championship would be paused in 2026. The decision followed the International Olympic Committee's announcement that it was cancelling its planned Esports Games, which had been a significant platform for the format's growth and its ambition to become a medal event at the Olympic level.

== Supertri E results ==
=== 2020 ===
==== Men ====
Venue	First	Second	Third
Rotterdam	Justus Nieschlag (GER)	Vasco Vilaça (POR)	Javier Gomez (ESP)

==== Women ====
Venue	First	Second	Third
Rotterdam	Jess Learmonth (GBR)	Rachel Klamer (NED)	Valerie Barthelemy (BEL)

=== 2021 ===
==== Men ====
Venue	First	Second	Third
Rotterdam	Marten Van Riel (BEL)	Alex Yee (GBR)	Aurélien Raphaël (FRA)
London	Marten Van Riel (BEL)	Justus Nieschlag (GER)	Alex Yee (GBR)

==== Women ====
Venue	First	Second	Third
Rotterdam	Sophie Coldwell (GBR)	Beth Potter (GBR)	Anna Godoy Contreras (ESP)
London	Beth Potter (GBR)	Lucy Charles-Barclay (GBR)	Sophie Coldwell (GBR)

=== 2022: World Championship Final Standings ===
==== Men ====
First	Second	Third
Alex Yee (GBR)	Justus Nieschlag (GER)	Aurélien Raphaël (FRA)

==== Women ====
First	Second	Third
Beth Potter (GBR)	Zsanett Bragmayer (HUN)	Georgia Taylor-Brown (GBR)

=== 2022: Race results ===
==== Men ====
Venue	First	Second	Third
Munich	Aurélien Raphaël (FRA)	Max Stapley (GBR)	Justus Nieschlag (GER)
London	Justus Nieschlag (GER)	Alex Yee (GBR)	Nicolo Strada (ITA)
Singapore	Hayden Wilde (NZL)	Alex Yee (GBR)	Justus Nieschlag (GER)

==== Women ====
Venue	First	Second	Third
Munich	Beth Potter (GBR)	Lena Meissner (GER)	Anabel Knoll (GER)
London	Cassandre Beaugrand (FRA)	Beth Potter (GBR)	Jessica Learmonth (GBR)
Singapore	Zsanett Bragmayer (HUN)	Beth Potter (GBR)	Georgia Taylor-Brown (GBR)

=== 2023: World Championship Final Standings ===
==== Men ====
First	Second	Third
Henri Schoeman (RSA)	Nicolo Strada (ITA)	Simon Westermann (SUI)

==== Women ====
First	Second	Third
Sophie Linn (AUS)	Gina Sereno (USA)	Rani Skrabanja (NED)

=== 2023: Race results ===
==== Men ====
Venue	First	Second	Third
Montreal	Chase McQueen (USA)	Henri Schoeman (RSA)	Jack Stanton-Stock (GBR)
Sursee	Henri Schoeman (RSA)	Maxime Hueber-Moosbrugger (FRA)	Simon Westermann (SUI)
London	Nicolo Strada (ITA)	Henri Schoeman (RSA)	Kyle Smith (NZL)

==== Women ====
Venue	First	Second	Third
Montreal	Gino Soreno (USA)	Sophie Linn (AUS)	Dominika Jamnicky (CAN)
Sursee	Zsanett Bragmayer (HUN)	Olivia Mathias (GBR)	Fanni Szalai (HUN)
London	Beth Potter (GBR)	Cassandre Beaugrand (FRA)	Sophie Linn (AUS)

=== 2024 ===
==== Men ====
Venue	First	Second	Third
London	Chase McQueen (USA)	Max Stapley (GBR)	Maxime Hueber-Moosbrugger (FRA)

==== Women ====
Venue	First	Second	Third
London	Beth Potter (GBR)	Cassandre Beaugrand (FRA)	Katie Zaferes (USA)

=== 2025 ===
==== Men ====
Venue	First	Second	Third
London	Maxime Hueber-Moosbrugger (FRA)	Chase McQueen (USA)	Maciej Bruzdziak (POL)

==== Women ====
Venue	First	Second	Third
London	Cassandre Beaugrand (FRA)	Beth Potter (GBR)	Julia Broecker (GER)
