= Katie Zaferes =

American triathlete (born 1989)

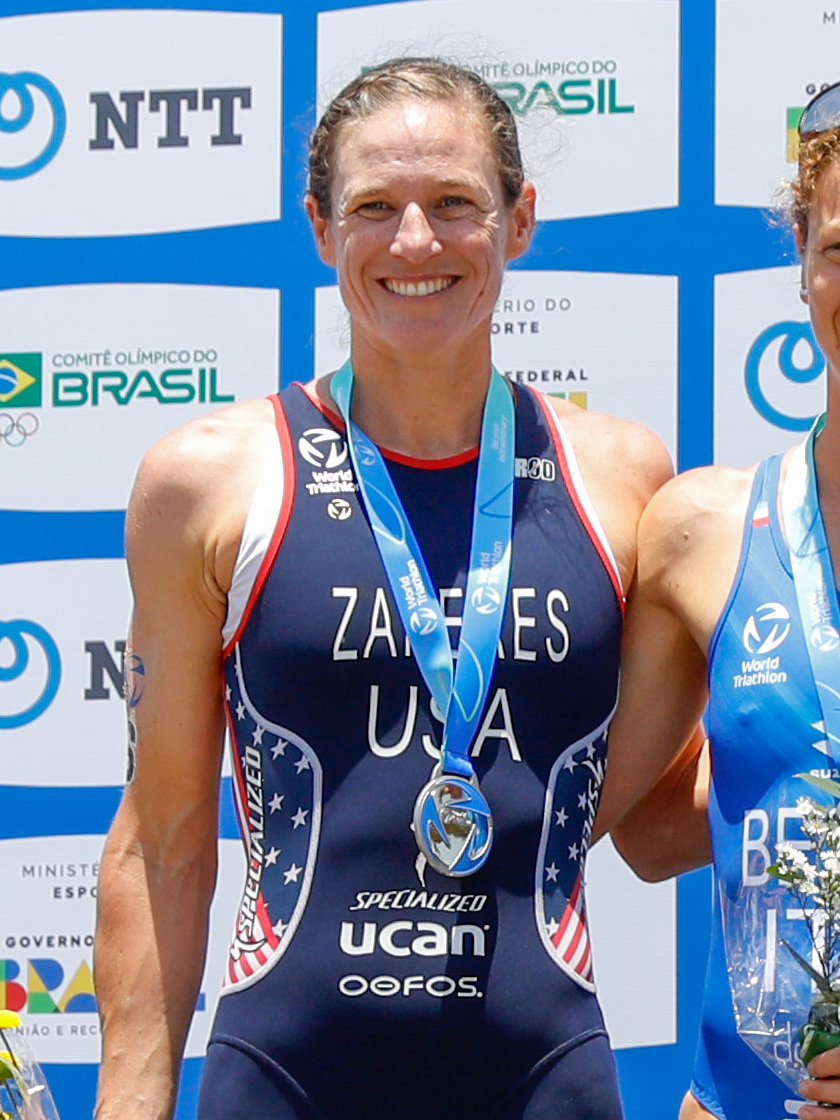

Personal information
- Born: Katie Hursey; June 9, 1989 (age 37) Hampstead, Maryland, United States
- Height: 5 ft 8 in (173 cm)
- Spouse: Tommy Zaferes
- Website: katiezaferes.com

Sport
- Sport: Triathlon
- Events: 1500 m, 3000 m, 5000 m, Steeplechase
- College team: Syracuse Orange track and field
- Club: JFT Crew
- Turned pro: 2012
- Coached by: Joel Filliol
Medal record
Women's triathlon
Representing the United States
Olympic Games
| Silver medal – second place | 2020 Tokyo | Mixed relay |
| Bronze medal – third place | 2020 Tokyo | Individual |
ITU Triathlon World Championships
| Gold medal – first place | 2019 Lausanne | Elite |
| Silver medal – second place | 2018 Gold Coast | Elite |
| Bronze medal – third place | 2017 Rotterdam | Elite |
Super League Triathlon
| Bronze medal – third place | 2021 Championship Series | Women |
| Gold medal – first place | 2019 Championship Series | Women |
| Gold medal – first place | 2018 Championship Series | Women |

Katie Zaferes (née Hursey) is an American professional triathlete from Hampstead, Maryland. She earned a silver and bronze medal for the United States in the 2020 Tokyo Olympic triathlon held in 2021. She is also the 2019 ITU World Triathlon Series women's champion. She has placed second overall in the 2018 ITU World Triathlon Series and third in the 2017 ITU World Triathlon Series. Zaferes won both the 2018 and 2019 Super League Triathlon Championship Series. She finished in 3rd position in the series in 2021.

== Education and early career ==
Zaferes attended North Carroll High School in Hampstead, Maryland. She won state championship in 2005 & 2007, and was a captain and multi-year letterwinner in cross country and outdoor track & field. She also lettered in lacrosse, soccer and swimming. She was six-time Carroll County Player of the Year among many other awards.

She was recruited to Syracuse University, where she was a member of the cross country and track and field teams from 2007 to 2012. She holds the school record in the outdoor 3,000m steeplechase (10:08.44) and indoor 5,000m run (16:40.95).

== Career ==
Turning professional in 2013, she raced her first top-flight World Triathlon Series event on April 19 in San Diego finishing 30th, and then went on to gain her first ITU World Cup podium with Gold in Palamos on the 14th of July. In her debut year, Zaferes was awarded the USA Triathlon Elite Rookie of the year.

The 2014 season yielded a number of podium results at World Cup level including her sole career disqualification due to an irregular transition at T2 in Auckland. She earned her first podium in the World Triathlon Series with a silver medal in Abu Dhabi on March 7, 2015, and following 6 podium finishes at World Triathlon Series (WTS) over the course of 2015 won her first WTS race in Hamburg on the 16th of July. Following this she had 10 podium finishes between her first WTS victory and her next, which came on the 8th March 2019 in Abu Dhabi. The 2019 season would go on to be her crowning achievement (to date) as she took wins in Bermuda, Yokohama and Montreal with a second place finish in Leeds, a 35th place finish in Hamburg following a crash, and a DNF at the Tokyo Olympic Qualification event which resulted in facial injuries. Despite this accident, some 15 days before the Grand Final in Lausanne, she took gold in the final to seal the overall title. In recognition of her achievements, USA Triathlon awarded Zaferes the "Women’s Olympic/ITU Triathlete of the Year".

Outside World Triathlon competition, Zaferes competes in Super League Triathlon. She won both the 2018 and 2019 Super League Triathlon Championship Series, and finished third, behind Georgia Taylor-Brown and Jess Learmonth of the United Kingdom, in 2021.

Zaferes year-over-year results in the World Triathlon Series include finishing 42nd in her debut year of 2013, 16th in 2014, 5th in 2015, 4th in 2016, 3rd in 2017, 2nd in 2018 and taking the overall title in 2019.

=== 2013–2016 seasons ===
Zaferes contested her first races as an elite athlete in the 2013 season, taking gold in the Palamos and Tiszaujvaros World Cup races. The following year Zaferes took gold in the New Plymouth World Cup race. Notably she contested the Auckland World Triathlon Series race, completing the swim, T1 and Bike portions of the race but receiving a disqualification in T2 due to "irregular transition".

In 2015, Zaferes' had a break-out year, taking silver in five World Triathlon Series races (Abu Dhabi, Auckland, Cape Town, London, Stockholm) plus bronze in Gold Coast. She finished the season in 5th place overall.

Next season, in 2016, Zaferes took her first ITU World Triathlon Series win in Hamburg. She also finished on the podium in Edmonton, taking bronze behind Summer Rappaport and Sarah True. She completed the 2016 World Triathlon Series ranked fourth overall.

As the top-ranked woman in USA Triathlon's ranking system, Zaferes was named to the triathlon team for the 2016 Summer Olympics where she finished 18th.

=== 2017 season ===
For the second time in her career, Zaferes won the New Plymouth World Cup event. She was 1 second over second-place Canadian Joanna Brown and 2 seconds over Belgian Claire Michel. This was the fourth time in a row an American won the race. She finished the season 3rd in the World Triathlon Series rankings, beating out Kirsten Kasper in 4th place.

=== 2018 season ===
Of the eight World Triathlon Series races in 2018, Zaferes finished on the podium in six of them, taking two silvers (Yokohama and Montreal), and four bronze (Bermuda, Leeds, Hamburg and the grand final in Gold Coast).

At the season opener at Abu Dhabi, the race was contested with the bike and run legs on the Yas Marina race track. Zaferes crashed hard within the tunnel section (believed to be caused by a combination of fuel / oil on the roadway and (rare) rainfall immediately prior to / during the race) and was unable to continue, registering a DNF. The remaining race of the season, Edmonton, resulted in a 6th place for Zaferes, notable as an uncharacteristically low finishing position in an otherwise high-placing and consistent season.

At the grand final in Gold Coast, Zaferes came into the race needing to finish ahead of her rival Vicky Holland to take the series and the title of World Triathlon Champion. On the run leg, Zaferes, Holland and the Australian athlete Ashleigh Gentle were together by the second lap of four at the head of the race. Gentle managed to distance her rivals, ultimately finishing clear in first place. Zaferes opened a gap to Holland which remained for some time before Holland managed to close the distance to Zaferes and they entered the finishing chute together, with Holland beating Zaferes in a sprint finish to take silver in the race and the overall title of ITU World Champion. Zaferes finished the 2018 season in 2nd place overall in the World Triathlon Series rankings.

=== 2019 season ===
Of the eight World Triathlon Series races in 2019, Zaferes finished in first place in five of them, taking the wins in Abu Dhabi, Bermuda, Yokohama, Montreal and the Grand Final in Lausanne.

Of the other races, Zaferes took a second place finish in Leeds having been outrun by Georgia Taylor-Brown, a 35th place finish in Hamburg following a crash, and a DNF at the Tokyo Olympic Qualification event which resulted in facial injuries. Despite this accident, some 15 days before the Grand Final in Lausanne, she took gold in the final to seal the overall title.

In recognition of her achievements, USA Triathlon awarded Zaferes the "Women’s Olympic/ITU Triathlete of the Year."

=== 2021 season ===
Zaferes didn't automatically qualify for the Olympics due to a cycling event crash, but was picked for the final team spot by a selection committee based on her previous results.

She won two medals in the triathlon at the Tokyo Olympics. On July 27, 2021, she won the bronze medal in the women's individual event. On July 31, she followed that up with a silver medal in the inaugural mixed relay event. Zaferes became the first Syracuse athlete since the 1928 Games to win 2 medals in the Olympics.

== Personal life ==
Zaferes was born in June 1989 to Bill and Mary Lynn Hursey. She married fellow triathlete Tommy Zaferes in 2015. The couple lives in Cary, North Carolina. In July 2022, Katie gave birth to a son named Kimble.
