= Waterfront (St Helier) =

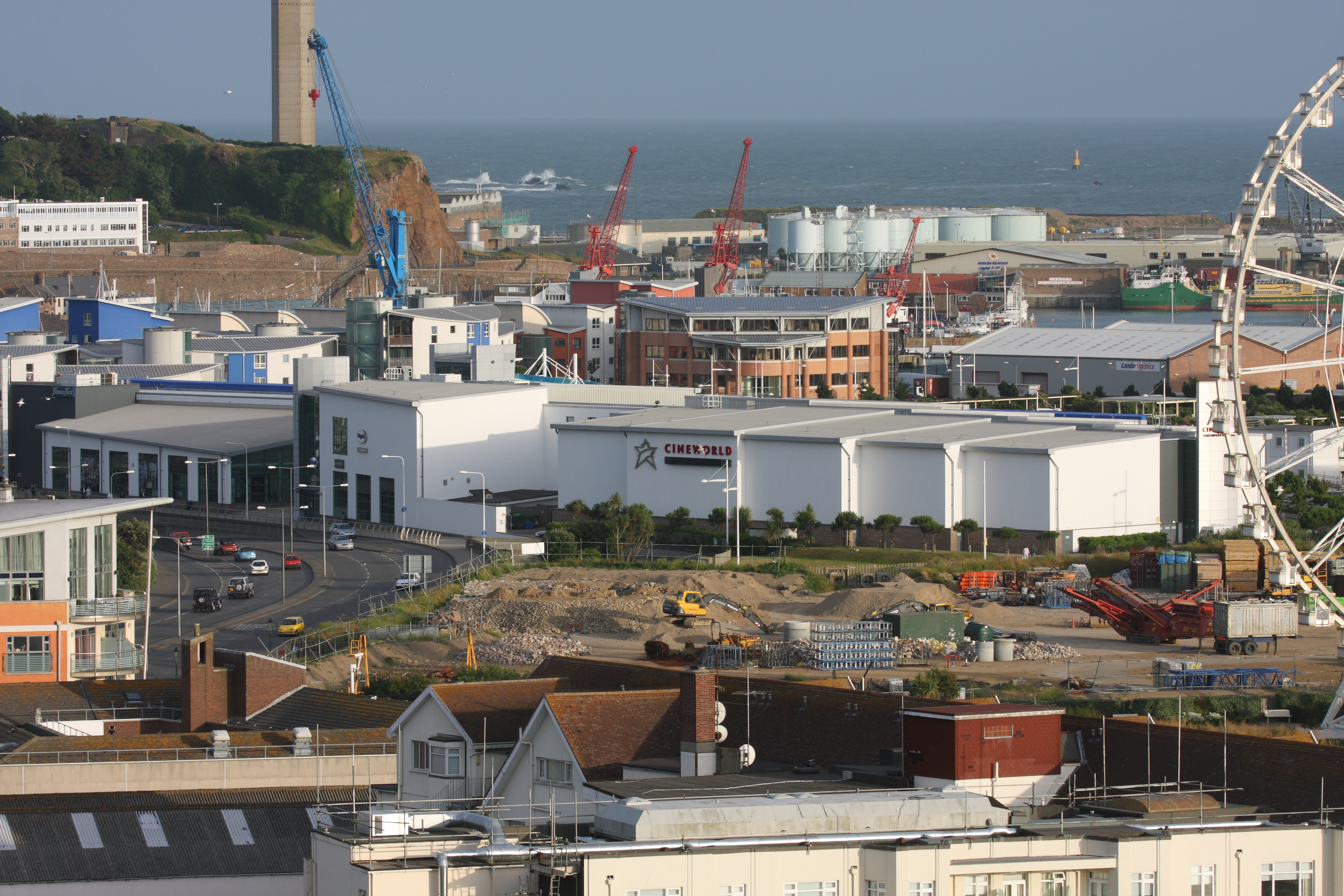
The Waterfront Centre in 2008

The Waterfront (Jèrriais: Quartchi du Hâvre, French: Quartier du Havre) is a district of St Helier in the island of Jersey. It is built on reclaimed land to the west of the Albert Pier and to the south of the Esplanade, however the definition is ambiguous and can be extended to cover older parts of the town

== History ==
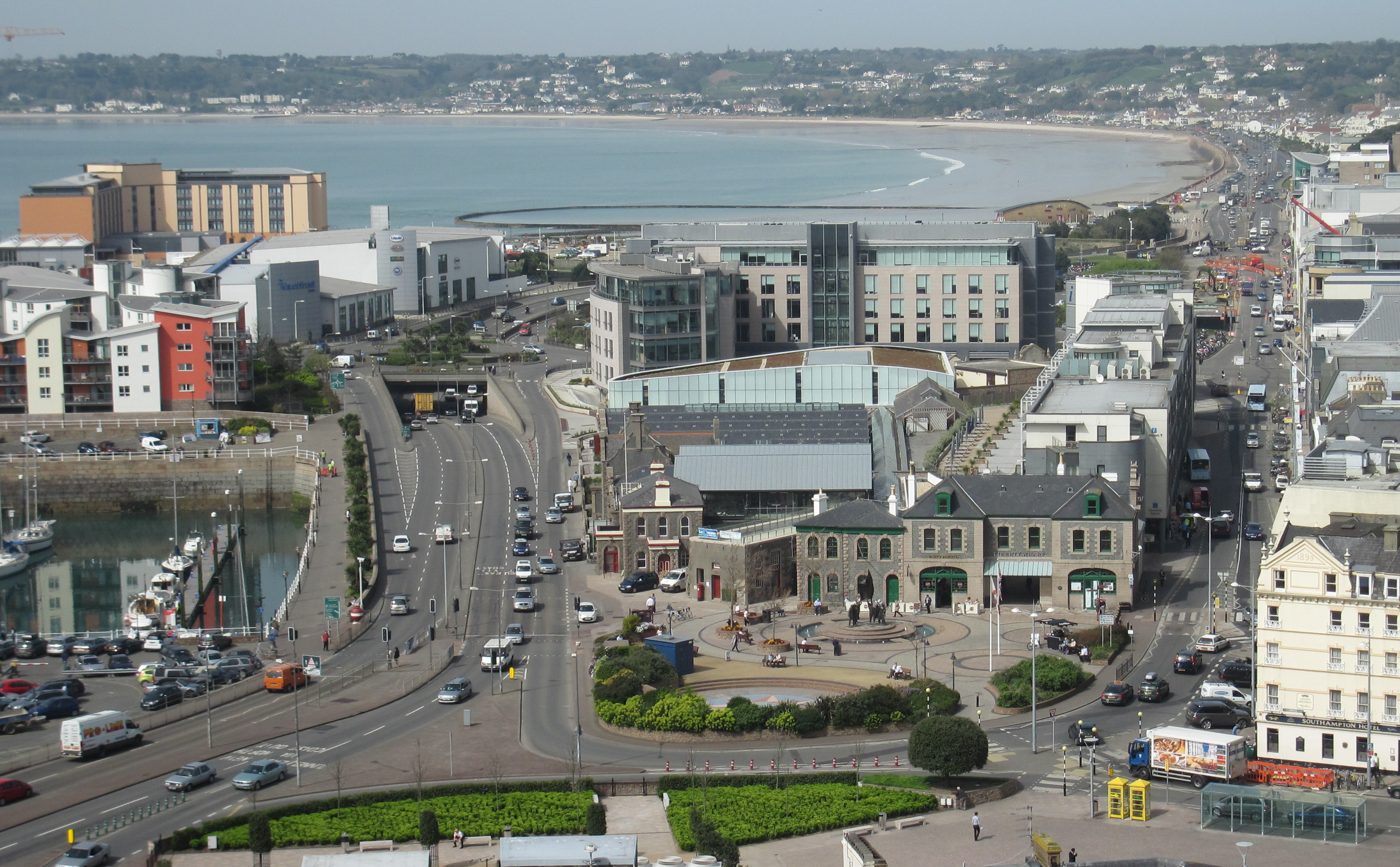
A view over the greater Waterfront area, including the Radisson in the background

On 24 April 1979, a States Committee was formed to investigate alternatives for reclamation because La Collette was due to be filled six years ahead of schedule. In September that year, they reported on a new scheme of roughly 160 vergées (29 hectares). However, it was considered that this would not be ready in time and would outstrip the supply of filling material in the island. Alternatively, it was proposed a smaller area of around 20 vergées to increase the working space on the Albert Pier.

In June 1980, the States voted to approve the reclamation of 58.5 vergées (10.5 hectares) of land to the west of Albert Pier.

In April 1981, the a proposition was lodged au Greffe proposing an expansion of this land reclamation to 78.7 vergées (14.1 hectares) because the larger scheme was less costly per vergée, extended the life of the site for tipping and allowed more flexibility in the design of future open space.

The filling of land began in May 1985, initially confined to the part closest to the Albert Pier to enable the construction of the new Elizabeth ferry harbour. During the reclamation, concerns were raised about the disposal of incinerator ash by States Members. The (2008) Council of Ministers noted that "[the method of disposal] in the late 1980s and early 1990s would not be acceptable today [in 2008]".

In 1989, a proposition was lodged au Greffe to approve a four-storey car park building (with three floors below ground) and a new postal headquarters and magistrates court. This also proposed to replace the large at-grade roundabout previously approved with the grade-separated junction and underpass present on Route de la Libération today.

In 2008, the Radisson SAS building won the Carbuncle Cup, an annual architectural prize for the worst designed building in the British Isles.

== Future ==
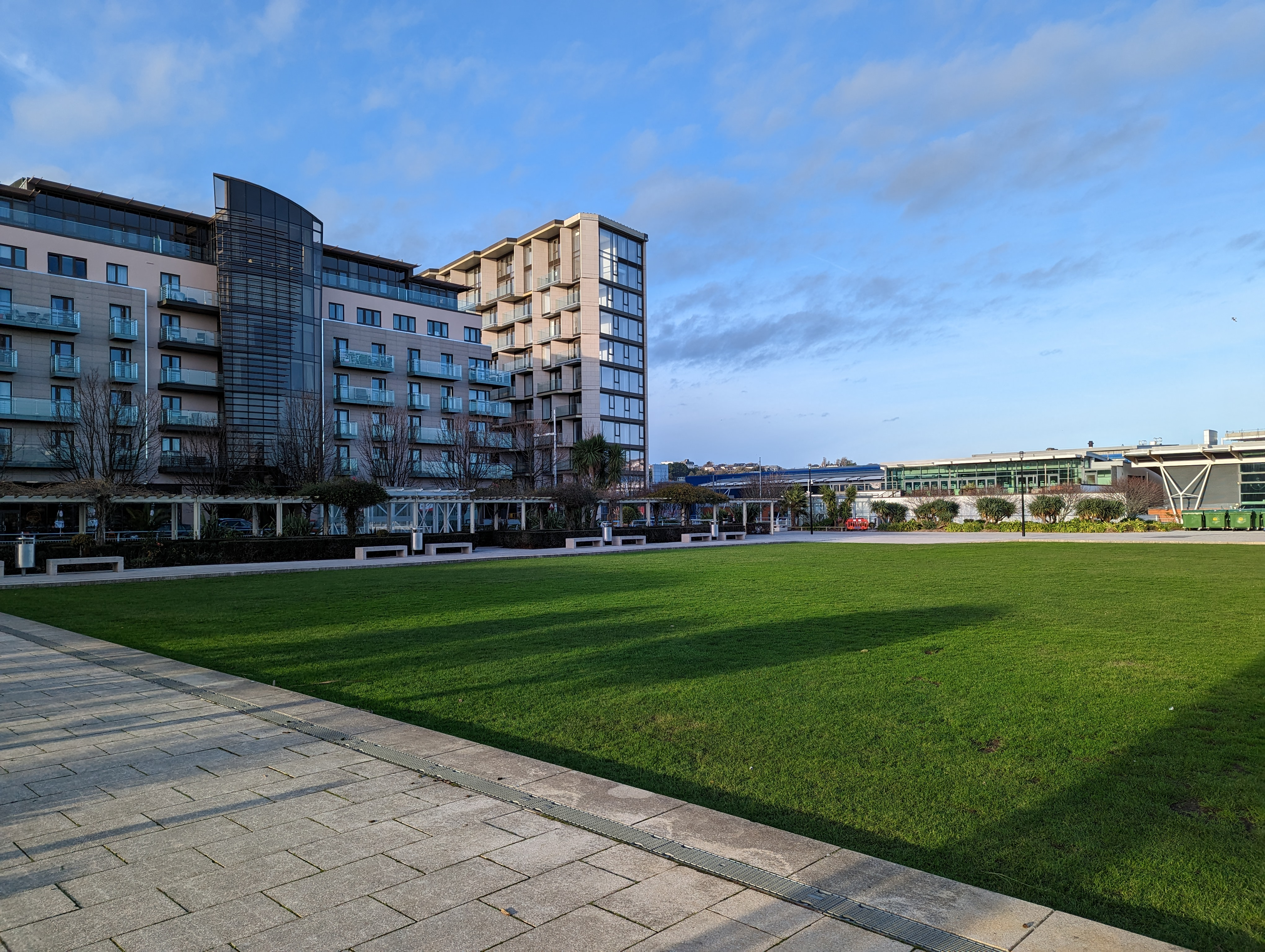
Waterfront Gardens (Jardîns du Quartchi du Hâvre) in 2022

In 2021–22, the Jersey Development Company prepared plans to regenerate the Waterfront site, involving the removal of the Waterfront centre and the construction of 1,000 homes, alongside parks, a swimming pool and cinema.

The JDC's plans involve the demolition of La Frégate Café, affectionately known as the "upside-down boat café". La Frégate was an early work by Will Alsop, who won the Stirling Prize for his architecture. Heritage campaigning group The Twentieth Century Society applied to the States to have the café listed, despite the building being too modern to be regularly listed. Alsop's former colleague Marcos Rosello notes "local support in Jersey" for the "much-loved building", hoping the building could be relocated rather than removed entirely.

== Sports ==
In 2021 and in previous years, the Waterfront played host to the international Super League triathlon, alongside courses in cities such as London and Munich.
