= Justus Nieschlag =

German triathlete

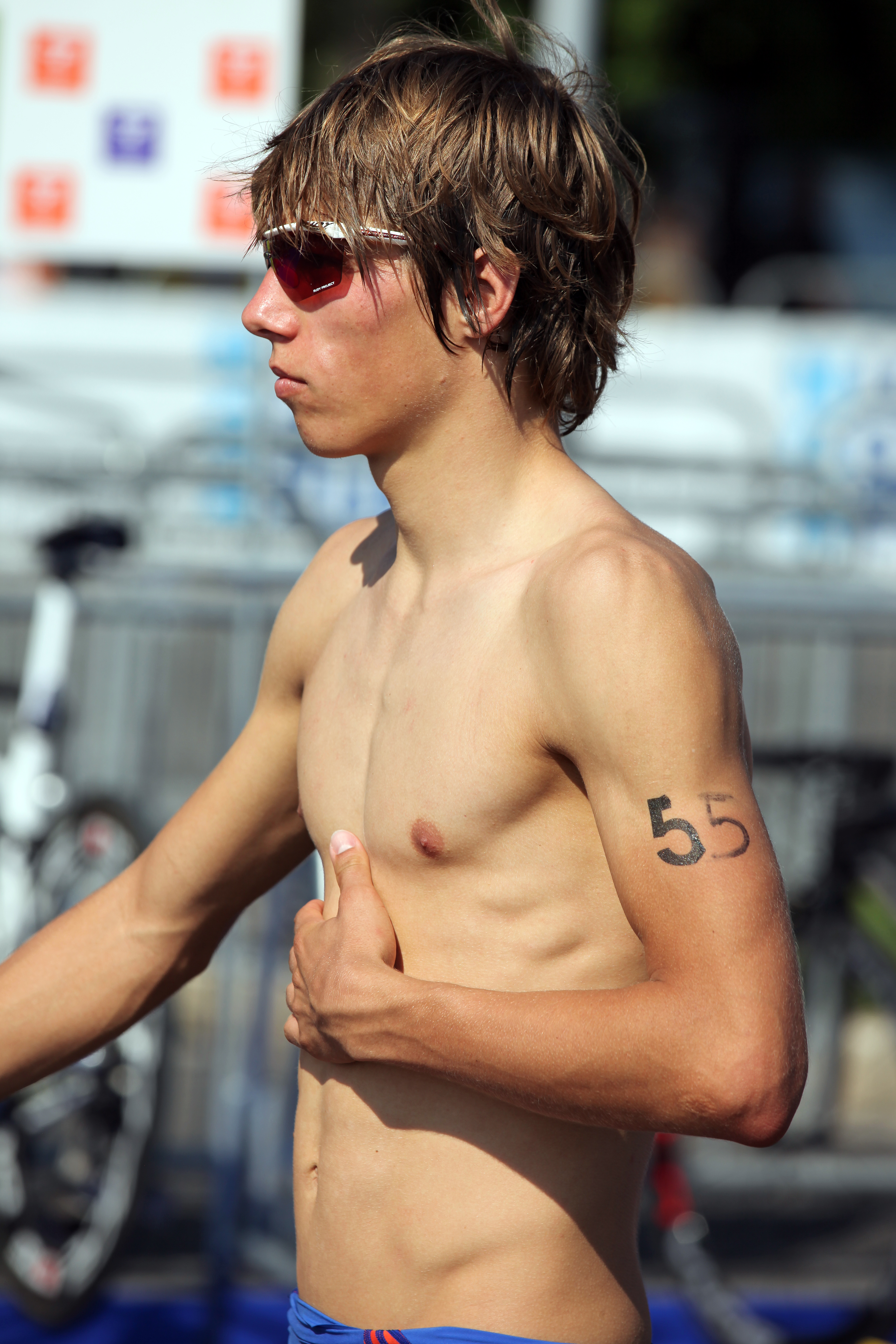
Justus Nieschlag at the Grand Final of the French Grand Prix de Triathlon in Nice, 2012.

Justus Nieschlag (born 9 March 1992 in Hildesheim), is a German professional triathlete, member of the National Team (B-Kader/U23), and the Junior European Champion of the year 2011.

In Germany, Nieschlag represents the club of his home town, Lehrte SV Triathlon. Since 2011, he also takes part in the German Club Championship Series Erste Bundesliga. In 2012, he represented the winning club EJOT Team Buschhütten.

In France, Nieschlag took part in the Grand Final of the Club Championship Series Grand Prix de Triathlon in Nice (16 September 2012) and placed 50th, turning out to be the second best runner of his French club Metz Tri, which placed 15th in Nice and 11th in the overall club ranking 2012.

Nieschlag also competes at Super League Triathlon events, and has been particularly successful in the Arena Games Triathlon format.

== ITU Competitions ==
In 2010 and 2011, his first two years of ITU competitions, Justus Nieschlag took part in four ITU events and achieved three top ten positions. In 2012, he achieved an elite bronze medal in Istanbul.

The following list is based upon the official rankings and the athlete's ITU Profile Page. Unless indicated otherwise, the following events are triathlons (Olympic Distance) and belong to the Elite category.

| Date | Competition | Place | Rank |
|---|---|---|---|
| 2010-07-03 | European Championships (Junior) | Athlone | 13 |
| 2011-06-24 | European Championships (Junior) | Pontevedra | 1 |
| 2011-07-03 | Junior European Cup | Düsseldorf | 5 |
| 2011-09-09 | Dextro Energy World Championship Series: Grand Final, Junior World Championship | Beijing | 2 |
| 2012-04-20 | European Championships (Mixed Relay) | Eilat | 2 |
| 2012-04-20 | European Championships | Eilat | 33 |
| 2012-05-06 | European Cup | Antalya | 20 |
| 2012-06-17 | World Cup | Banyoles | 39 |
| 2012-07-01 | European Cup | Istanbul | 3 |
| 2012-07-07 | Premium European Cup | Holten | 7 |

DNF = did not finish · DNS = did not start · DQ = disqualified

== Super League Triathlon ==
Nieschlag also competes in Super League Triathlon competitions. He has competed in Arena Games racing since its inception in 2020. Nieschlag was the winner of the inaugural Arena Games held in Rotterdam, 2020. He had a second-place finish at the SLT Arena Games London in 2021, and continued his strong Arena Games tradition with a podium finish at Arena Games Triathlon Powered by Zwift Munich, the first event of the inaugural Esports Triathlon World Championship series. On 23 April 2022, Nieschlag won Arena Games Triathlon Powered by Zwift London, in the process becoming the most successful athlete of all time in the Arena Games format. He has achieved four Arena Games podium finishes since the inaugural event, in Rotterdam 2020. At the series finale in Singapore, Nieschlag finished 3rd. This gave him enough points overall to finish second in the inaugural Esports Triathlon World Championship.
