= Miriam Casillas =

Spanish triathlete (born 1992)

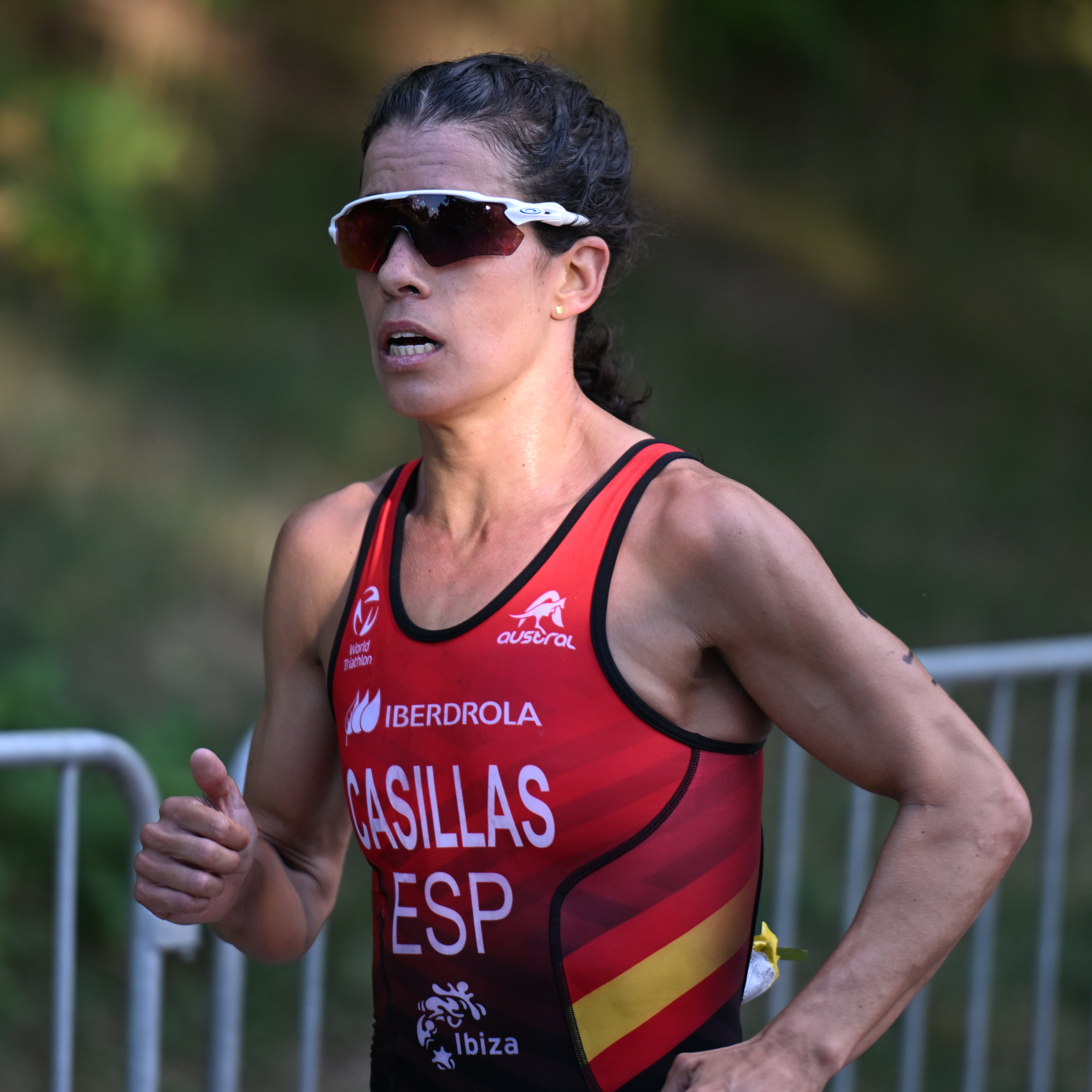

Personal information
- Full name: Miriam Casillas García
- Born: 24 June 1992 (age 34) Badajoz, Spain

Sport
- Country: Spain
- Sport: Triathlon
Medal record
Women's Triathlon
Representing Spain
Super League Triathlon
| Silver medal – second place | 2022 Malibu | Eliminator |

Miriam Casillas García (born 24 June 1992) is a Spanish triathlete. She competed in the women's event at the 2016 Summer Olympics held in Rio de Janeiro, Brazil. In 2021, she competed in the women's event at the 2020 Summer Olympics in Tokyo, Japan. She also competed in the mixed relay event.

As of 2022, Garcia also competes at Super League Triathlon. She won her first Super League Triathlon event podium at the SLT Malibu 2022, where she came 2nd.

She competed in the women's triathlon at the 2024 Summer Olympics in Paris, France.
