= Taylor Spivey =

American professional triathlete (born 1991)

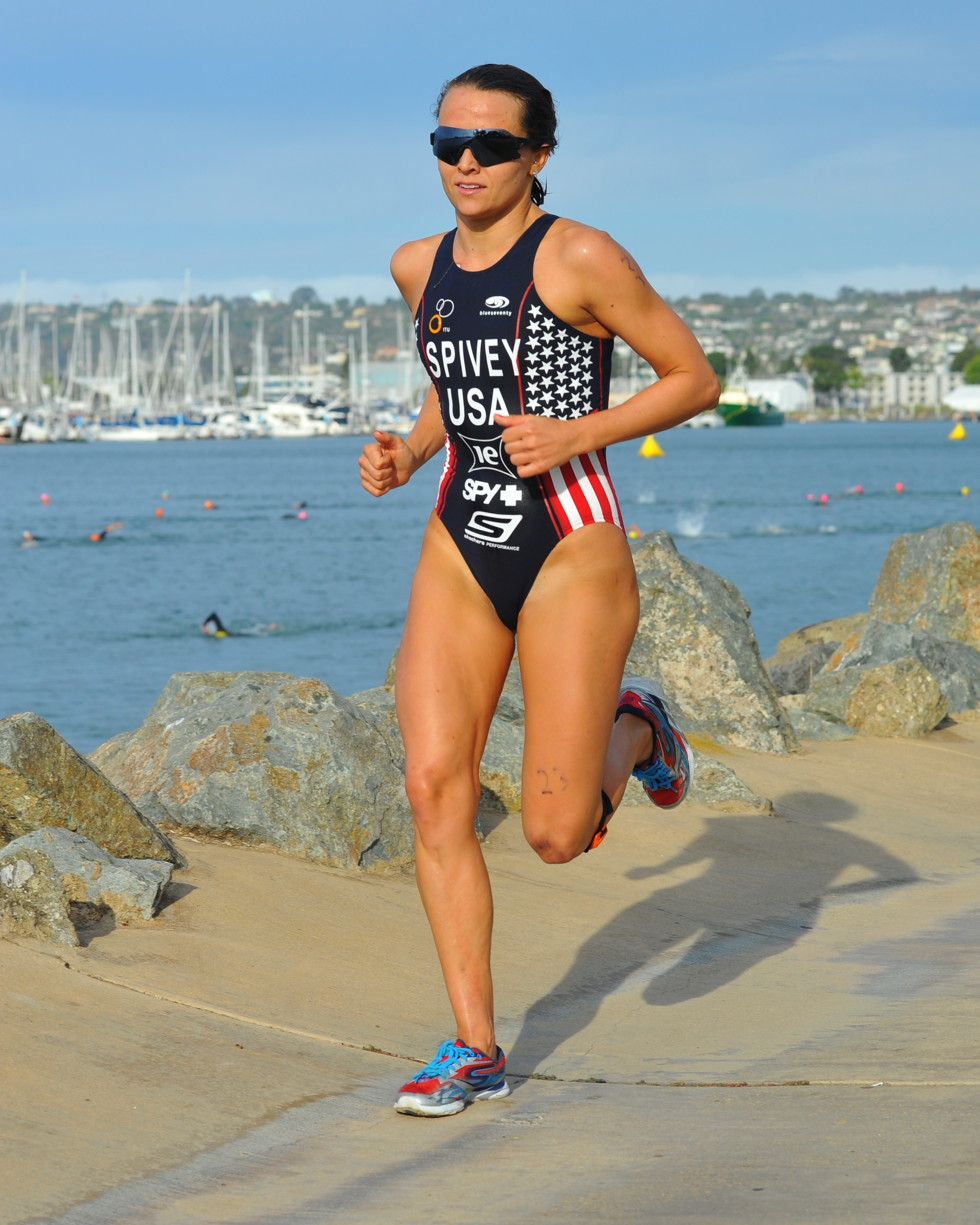
- Spivey in 2015

Personal information
- Full name: Taylor Katherine Spivey
- Born: April 13, 1991 (age 35) Redondo Beach, California, U.S.
- Website: www.tkspivey.com

Sport
- Sport: Triathlon
- Coached by: Paulo Sousa
Medal record
Women's triathlon
Representing the United States
Olympic Games
Silver medal – second place	2024 Paris	Mixed relay
Super League Triathlon
Silver medal – second place	2022	Championship Series
Gold medal – first place	2022 Malibu	Eliminator
Silver medal – second place	2022 London	Triple Mix
Silver medal – second place	2022 Toulouse	Triple Mix
Bronze medal – third place	2022 Munich	Enduro

Taylor Spivey (born April 13, 1991) is an American professional triathlete. At the conclusion of the 2019 season she placed fourth in the ITU World Triathlon Series behind Katie Zaferes, Jess Learmonth, and Georgia Taylor-Brown. This followed up an 8th place series finish in 2018, 12th in 2017 and 50th in 2016. Spivey competes at Elite pro level in the ITU Triathlon World Cup, ITU World Triathlon Series, Grand Prix de Triathlon, American Triathlon Confederation (CAMTRI) and Super League Triathlon competitions.

== Career ==
Spivey is the daughter of Marc Spivey and Bonnie Spivey. In interviews she has credited her parents with her introduction to triathlon, with her mother having a former career as a professional long course (Ironman) triathlete and her father also competing at Ironman distance as an age-group athlete. Her mother competed in an Ironman event while with Spivey. Born in Southern California, her background is in surf lifesaving, she won several national titles as an LA County Lifeguard. She swam for the Cal Poly Mustangs, competing in distance freestyle events. She took up short course (sprint and standard distance) triathlon in college.

Spivey attended Mira Costa High School, and went on to study Architecture at California Polytechnic State University, graduating with a BA Architecture (cum laude).

Spivey competes at Elite pro level in the ITU Triathlon World Cup, ITU World Triathlon Series, Grand Prix de Triathlon, American Triathlon Confederation (CAMTRI) and Super League Triathlon competitions. All of these competitions are short course (sprint and standard distance triathlon at world cup and ITU World Triathlon Series level) although in interviews she has expressed an interest in competing in middle distance (half-iron distance) triathlons in the future.

Spivey trains with The Triathlon Squad, a training group headed by lead coach Paulo Sousa and composed of a mix of American and international athletes. She is also a member of Poissy Triathlon, a professional triathlon team which competes as part of the French Triathlon Grand Prix.

Spivey has enjoyed a successful start to her 2022 Super League Triathlon Season with podium finishes at the first four races of the season, including taking the top spot at her home race, at SLT Malibu 2022. She finished fourth in the final event of the series, in NEOM Saudi Arabia, a performance which secured 2nd place in the series overall.

She competed in the women's triathlon at the 2024 Summer Olympics in Paris, France.

=== ITU World Triathlon Series competitions ===
Spivey's ITU World Triathlon Series race results are:

Results list

Date	Competition	Place	Rank
2019-08-31	World Triathlon Series	Grand Final Lausanne	09
2019-08-15	World Triathlon Series	Tokyo Olympic Qualification Event	08
2019-07-20	World Triathlon Series	Edmonton	05
2019-07-07	World Triathlon Series	Mixed Relay Series Hamburg	09
2019-07-06	World Triathlon Series	Hamburg	06
2019-06-09	World Triathlon Series	Leeds	04
2019-05-18	World Triathlon Series	Yokohama	03
2019-04-27	World Triathlon Series	Bermuda	06
2019-03-08	World Triathlon Series	Abu Dhabi	02
2018-09-15	World Triathlon Series	Grand Final Gold Coast	07
2018-08-25	World Triathlon Series	Montreal	07
2018-07-28	World Triathlon Series	Mixed Relay Series Edmonton	02
2018-07-27	World Triathlon Series	Edmonton	10
2018-07-14	World Triathlon Series	Hamburg	09
2018-06-10	World Triathlon Series	Leeds	07
2018-05-12	World Triathlon Series	Yokohama	24
2018-04-28	World Triathlon Series	Bermuda	9
2018-03-02	World Triathlon Series	Abu Dhabi	19
2017-09-16	World Triathlon Series	Grand Final Rotterdam	16
2017-08-26	World Triathlon Series	Stockholm	11
2017-07-28	World Triathlon Series	Edmonton	11
2017-07-15	World Triathlon Series	Hamburg	13
2017-06-10	World Triathlon Series	Leeds	2
2017-04-08	World Triathlon Series	Gold Coast	13
2016-09-03	World Triathlon Series	Edmonton	11

=== ITU Triathlon World Cup competitions ===
Spivey's ITU Triathlon World Cup Series race results are:

Results list

Date	Competition	Place	Rank
2018-10-13	World Cup	Sarasota-Bradenton	07
2018-09-22	World Cup	Weihai	01
2018-06-02	World Cup	Cagliari	02
2018-03-25	World Cup	New Plymouth	4
2017-11-04	World Cup	Miyazaki	2
2017-10-28	World Cup	Tongyeong	8
2017-10-08	World Cup	Sarasota	5
2017-06-28	World Cup	Madrid	2
2017-06-28	World Cup	New Plymouth	4
2016-09-25	World Cup	Salinas	8
2016-08-07	World Cup	Montreal	9

=== American Triathlon Confederation competitions ===
Spivey's American Triathlon Confederation (CAMTRI) race results are:

Results list

Date	Competition	Place	Rank
2018-10-14	CAMTRI American Championships	Mixed Relay Sarasota-Bradenton	01

=== Super League Triathlon competitions ===
Spivey's Super League Triathlon race results are:

Results list

Date	Competition	Place	Rank
2019-11	Superleague Mallorca	Equalizer & Eliminator	01
2019-10	Superleague Malta	Triple Mix & Sprint Enduro	04
2022-09	Superleague London	Triple Mix	02
2022-09	Superleague Munich	Enduro	03
2022-09	Superleague Malibu	Eliminator	01
2022-10	Superleague Toulouse	Triple Mix	02
2022-10	Superleague NEOM	Enduro	04
