= Leonid Boguslavsky =

(1951 -) Canadian entrepreneur

- Born: Леонид Борисович Богуславский; 17 June 1951 (age 75); Moscow, USSR
- Occupations: entrepreneur, scientist
- Children: Anastassia Boguslavskaya, Dimitri Boguslavsky, Zoya Boguslavskaya, Mark Boguslavsky

Leonid Boguslavsky (born June 17, 1951 Moscow, Soviet Union) is a USSR-born Canadian entrepreneur, scientist and venture capital investor. He was named the Internet investor of the year (Forbes, 2012) and the most successful investor of the year (RBC, 2017). He is the founder of RTP Global, a venture capital firm with offices in New York, London, Paris, Bangalore and Dubai. He was one of the first investors in companies such as Datadog or Delivery Hero. Boguslavsky is in Forbes' billionaires list. His wealth is self-made from venture capital investments with more than 99% created outside of Russia. He is widely considered one of the most successful technology investors. In the global Forbes 2023 ranking, he occupied the 787th place with a fortune of $8.6 billion.

== Early life ==
He was born into the family of writer Zoya Boguslavskaya and scientist-engineer Boris Kagan; he was the stepson of poet Andrei Voznesensky.

Boguslavsky studied physics-mathematics at school in Moscow, USSR. In sixth grade he won the Moscow University Biology Olympiad and went on a year later to win the USSR TV Mathematics Olympiad. In 1973 under the rector Fyodor Kochnev, Boguslavsky graduated from the Moscow Institute of Transport Engineering, (MIIT) where his father Boris Kagan taught, majoring in Computer Science and Applied Mathematics.

From 1973 to 1990, he conducted scientific research at the Institute of Control Sciences of the USSR Academy of Sciences in mathematics for computer systems and networks. Upon receiving his Doctorate of Science (Engineering), Boguslavsky wrote articles, scientific books and made inventions while heading his own laboratory.

In 1985, together with a team of developers from the Academy of Science of Moldova, Boguslavsky launched a project to create a software system to connect IBM mainframes with Digital minicomputers and personal computers into an integrated computer network. As a result, he was awarded two significant contracts to implement these networks in 1987, one in a Czech coal mining company and another at the Polytechnic University in Slovakia.

== Career ==
=== Beginnings (1989-1990) ===
In 1989, Boguslavsky started to work in a Soviet Italian joint venture focused on computer network projects in Czechoslovakia. He became deputy director and shareholder of the company.

In 1990, Boguslavsky was offered by Oracle Corporation to distribute Oracle software products in the USSR and he concluded the exclusive distribution agreement with Oracle for the territory of the USSR. He founded LVS in 1990.

From 1991 to 1992, he served as a visiting professor at the Department of Computer Science of the University of Toronto, Canada.

He returned to Moscow to work for Oracle.

In 1992, Boguslavsky concentrated on his own business – the company LVS which is a systems integration business.

In 1993, LVS developed the Oracle-based information system for the apartment registrar of Moscow.

In 1994, LVS became so dominant as the producer of electronic voting machine equipment and its software that by 1997 PricewaterhouseCoopers chose LVS and its software and equipment as system integrator with Boguslavsky becoming a senior partner and receiving $10 million from Pricewaterhouse's buyout of LVS.

In late 1996 Boguslavsky sold LVS to PricewaterhouseCoopers (currently known as PwC) and then became a Managing Partner at PwC, in charge of its Management Consulting Services (MCS) practice in Russia in early 1997.

In December 1999, Boguslavsky met investment bankers Charles Ryan (UFG), Michael Calvey (Baring Vostok) and David Mixer (Rex Capital), who were planning to set up an Internet investment company at that time.

=== Investment (2000-) ===
In 2000, ru-Net Holdings Limited, an investment company with startup capital of $20 million, was jointly founded by Boguslavsky, Charles Ryan of UFG, Michael Calvey of Baring Vostok and David Mixer of Rex Capital. Boguslavsky invested a substantial amount of the total holdings and became chairman of the board of directors. In the same year, ru-Net Holdings Limited invested in Yandex, paying $5.27 million for a 35% stake, and in the online retailer Ozon.ru, buying a controlling stake for $3 million. Both projects were part of big IT companies – Comptek and Reksoft as non-core businesses; thus, they became two independent companies due to the investments. After Boguslavsky decided to leave PwC and focus on investing in Internet companies. However, he still had his position in PwC for one more year to look for a successor and arrange the formalities of the handover. Boguslavsky left PwC in 2001 and became CEO and chairman of the board of directors of ru-Net Holdings.

During 2000 and 2001, ru-Net Holdings survived the dot-com crisis, although some investors intended to exit the business and distribute the remaining funds. Some investors were especially concerned about the future of Yandex, whose revenues were low at the time.

ru-Net Holdings made its first investments in a couple of system integration and software development companies in 2002, buying stakes in TopS (Russia-based enterprise management systems integrator) and VDI (offshore programming). Later, VDI merged with Epam to become the largest offshore programming and software outsourcing company in Central and Eastern Europe and launched an IPO on NASDAQ. ru-Net Holdings restructured its business in 2006 with only Yandex shares left and the company changed its name to Internet Search Investment Limited (ISIL). Other assets (including shares of Ozon.ru, TopS, and VDI) were distributed among the shareholders of ru-Net Holdings. As a result, Boguslavsky was still a significant shareholder of ISIL and, accordingly, a beneficiary of shareholding in Yandex (he had also invested additional funds) on one hand and obtained corresponding stakes in all other assets on the other hand.

In 2006 he set up his own investment company ru-Net Limited that took control of his assets and made new investments in IT and Internet technologies and services. VDI merged with Epam, and TopS joined Systematica (Russian: «Систематика») and the AND Project companies transforming into Systematica Group. Boguslavsky became chairman of its board of directors. Later a large stake in the Group was bought by A1. Later Systematica Group acquired a large distributor, Landata. ru-Net Limited also owned Energodata, a big IT outsourcing company supporting SAP systems in Russia's federal electric grid sector. Additionally, ru-Net established PSI Energo, a joint venture with the German software company PSI AG, to introduce dispatching information systems into electric grids. The former head of Microsoft in Russia, Olga Dergunova (Russian: Ольга Дергунова), will be an independent director.

In 2007 Boguslavsky invested in HeadHunter and iContext. Boguslavsky left the board of directors in Yandex in 2008 as he started investing in companies that could potentially create a conflict of interest with Yandex.

Yandex floated 17.6% of its shares on NASDAQ for $1.3 billion on 24 May 2011. Boguslavsky sold a small portion of his shares during the IPO. He partly used the funds (about $60 million) to invest in the purchase of new shares in Ozon, leading to the largest investment ($100 million) in an Internet company in Russian history.

In 2011 Leonid set up a US-based subsidiary, the venture capital company - ru-Net Technology Partners (RTP Ventures), opening a New York office. Headed by Kirill Sheynkman, RTP actively invests in early-stage companies in the US market with investments in Big Data, SaaS, cloud computing, Fintech, Health Care, IoT and Information Security. ru-Net also started investing in Europe and India. Among some of the early investments was German startup Delivery Hero that later in 2017 was valuated at €4.5 billion at IPO.

In India, Boguslavsky invested in Practo, Faasos, Snapdeal and other companies. In the United States his investments include RingCentral, which had a successful IPO in 2013.

In 2016, Boguslavsky invested in European internet company Urban Sport Club, that sells passes to sport and fitness clubs. He also co-founded the first professional international league in triathlon - Super League Triathlon (SLT). His partners are the triathlon athlete Chris McCormack and Michael D’Hulst.

In October 2018, ru-Net rebranded to RTP Global.

He received an investment return of 400 or 500 times from his original stake of $11 million in 2012 with his American company Datadog after its IPO which has a capitalization of $32 billion at the end of 2020, generating approximately $5 billion in profit.

=== RTP Global ===
In 2020, Leonid set up RTP Global third fund of $650 million. RTP Global manages assets in excess of $3 billion as of early 2022.

In all of RTP Global's funds since inception, the vast majority of capital has derived from him. He contributes >99% of the capital in the current fund, the vast majority of his wealth having been created in Europe and in the US.

RTP Global does not invest in Russia. Its portfolio includes businesses from 18 countries across the world.

== Personal life ==
Boguslavsky holds Canadian citizenship since 1996. He lives in Italy. Leonid is not and has not been a tax resident in Russia since February 2015.

He is married and has four children. His hobbies include kitesurfing, skiing, triathlon, bicycle racing and extreme travelling. In 2013, he started his first triathlon training and took part in several Ironman races. He managed to get his first podium spot after only six months of training. A year and a half later, being a prizewinner of several races in his age category, he qualified for the 2015 Ironman World Championship in Kona, Hawaii. He is the founder of Super League Triathlon, having established it in 2017 and has stakes in Zwift which provides equipment for virtual running and virtual cycling.

In 2013, Boguslavsky together with his mother, Zoya Boguslavskaya, established the Andrei Voznesensky Fund in memory of Zoya's late husband, Russian Poet, Andrei Voznesensky. In 2016, Boguslavsky created the Andrei Voznesensky Center of Culture.

=== Response to Russia's invasion of Ukraine ===
Boguslavsky released a statement in February 2022 calling "for an immediate end to the catastrophic and unjustified war in Ukraine", adding that he "could not remain silent seeing what is happening in Ukraine". The statement included that he "moved from Russia to Canada as a young man to work as a University Professor, and it was from here that he started an investment career that has turned into a global portfolio of successful businesses [...] Leonid has no political ties to Russia". RTP Global has never received an investment from a Russian institution and more than 99% of Boguslavsky's net worth was created outside of Russia. It does not invest in Russia.
