= Vasco Vilaça =

Portuguese triathlete

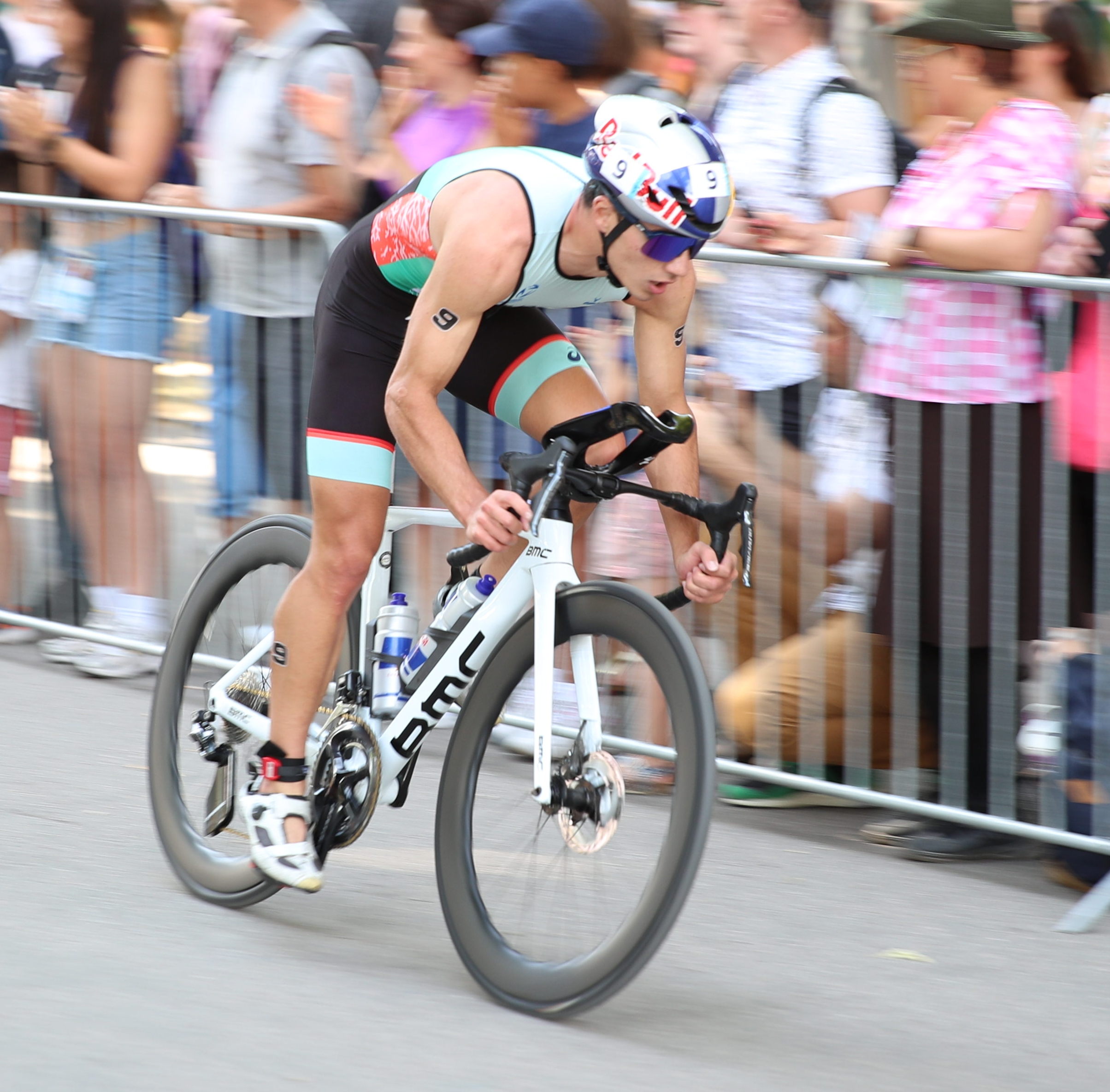
- Vilaça in 2022

Personal information
- Full name: Vasco de Paiva Vilaça
- Nationality: Portuguese
- Born: 21 December 1999 (age 26) Amadora, Lisbon, Portugal
- Education: Linköping University
- Height: 170 cm (5 ft 7 in)
- Weight: 65 kg (143 lb)
- Website: vascovilaca.com

Sport
- Country: Portugal
- Sport: Triathlon
- Club: Benfica
Medal record
Men's triathlon
Representing Portugal
World Triathlon Series
Gold medal – first place	2026 season	Men
Silver medal – second place	2020 Hamburg (F) (Note: Due to the COVID-19 pandemic, the International Triathlon Union (ITU) decided to award season titles to winners of the last event, held in Hamburg)	Men
Bronze medal – third place	2025 season	Men
World Triathlon Sprint Championships
Silver medal – second place	2023 Hamburg	Elite
World Triathlon Grand Final
Silver medal – second place	2017 Rotterdam	Junior
European Triathlon Championships
Gold medal – first place	2017 Kitzbühel	Junior
Super League Triathlon
Silver medal – second place	2020 Rotterdam	SLT Arena Games
Silver medal – second place	2022 Munich	Enduro
Bronze medal – third place	2021 Malibu	Eliminator
Bronze medal – third place	2022 Malibu	Eliminator

Vasco de Paiva Vilaça (born 21 December 1999) is a Portuguese triathlete. He won the gold medal at the 2017 European Triathlon Championships on the Junior Men category and later on, a silver medal at the ITU World Triathlon Grand Final in Rotterdam also on the Junior category.

Vilaça also competes in Super League Triathlon. He finished 12th in the 2019 Championship series and 4th in 2021. He finished in second place at the inaugural SLT Arena Games, held in Rotterdam, 2020.

Vilaça took his first Super League Triathlon Championship Series event podium in Munich, in the 2022 series, when he finished 2nd behind Australian Triathlete Matthew Hauser.

== Personal life ==
His one year older sister, Vera Vilaça, is also an elite Portuguese triathlete with both of them being national champions on almost every age category.
