= Anabel Knoll =

German triathlete

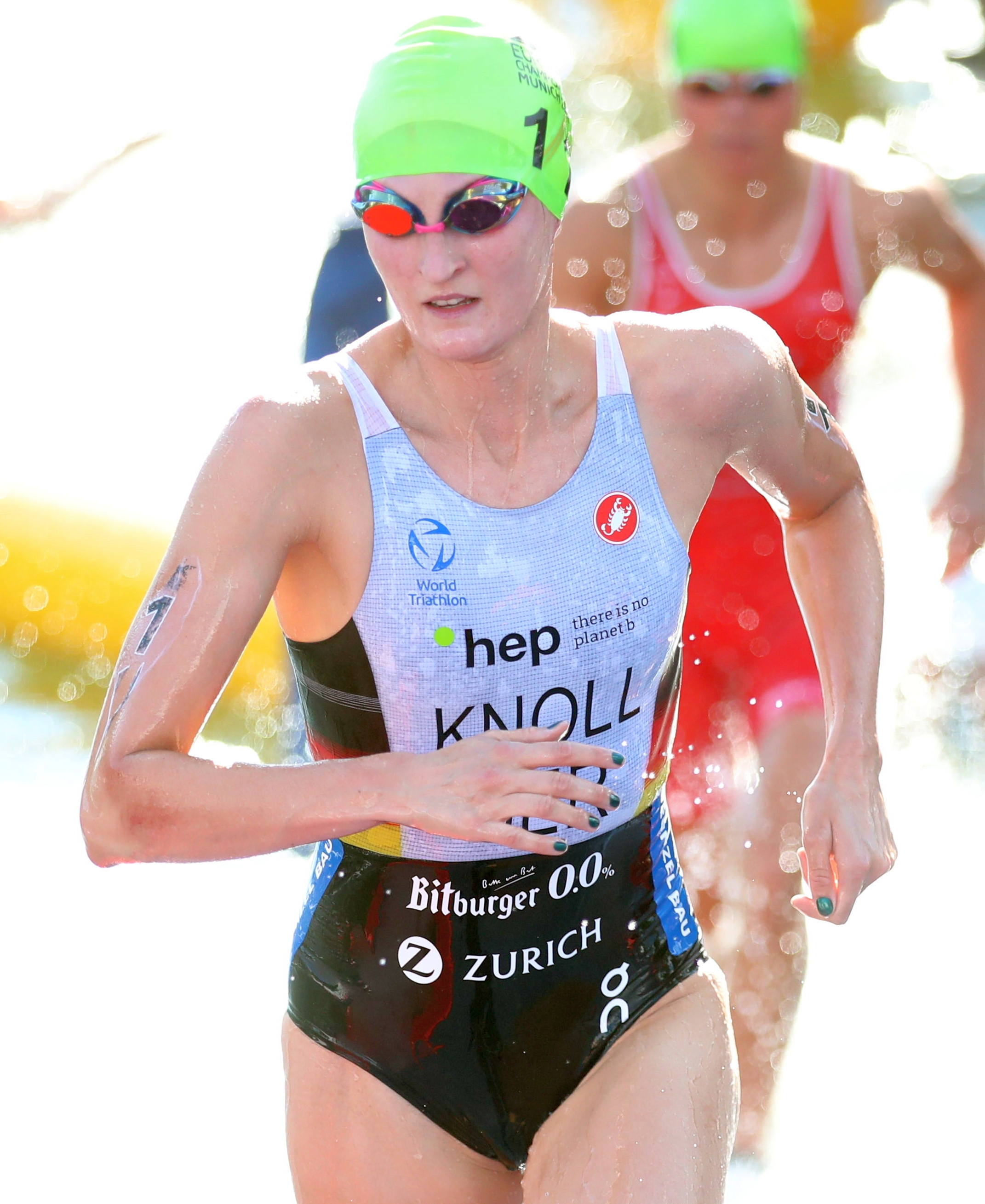

Personal information
- Nationality: German
- Born: 10 April 1996 (age 30) Ingolstadt, Germany

Sport
- Sport: Triathlon
Medal record
Women's triathlon
Super League Triathlon
Bronze medal – third place	Munich 2022	Arena Games Triathlon

Anabel Knoll (born 10 April 1996) is a German triathlete. She competed in the women's event at the 2020 Summer Olympics held in Tokyo, Japan. She also competed in the mixed relay event. Knoll also competes in Super League Triathlon events. Knoll finished in bronze medal position at Arena Games Triathlon Powered by Zwift Munich, the first event of the inaugural Arena Games Triathlon Esports World Championship Series.

Knoll attended Nova Southeastern University, where she ran for the school's track and field and cross country teams in NCAA Division II.
