= Zsanett Bragmayer =

Hungarian triathlete (born 1994)

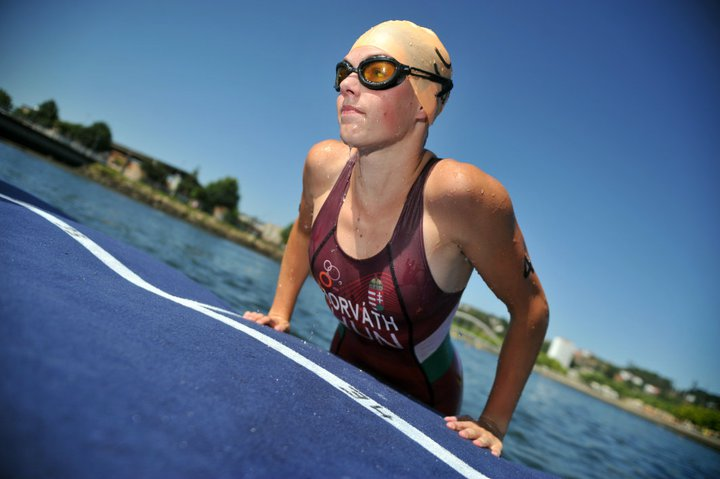

Personal information
- Nationality: Hungarian
- Born: 29 March 1994 (age 32) Budapest, Hungary

Sport
- Sport: Triathlon
Medal record
Representing Hungary
Women's triathlon
European Games
Bronze medal – third place	2023 Kraków-Małopolska	Mixed relay
Super League Triathlon
Silver medal – second place	2022 Arena Games Championship Series	Elite

Zsanett Bragmayer (born 29 March 1994) is a Hungarian triathlete. She competed in the women's event at the 2020 Summer Olympics held in Tokyo, Japan. She also competed in the mixed relay event.

Bragmayer also competes in Super League Triathlon events. She won the finale of the 2022 Arena Games Triathlon series in Singapore, which was enough for her to finish in second place in the inaugural Esports Triathlon World Championship series.

She competed in the women's triathlon at the 2024 Summer Olympics in Paris, France.
