= Sophie Coldwell =

British triathlete (born 1995)

Personal information
- Born: 25 February 1995 (age 31) Gravesend, England

Sport
- Country: Great Britain
- Sport: Triathlon
Medal record
Representing England
Women's triathlon
Commonwealth Games
Gold medal – first place	2022 Birmingham	Mixed relay
Super League Triathlon
Bronze medal – third place	2022	Championship Series
Bronze medal – third place	2022 Toulouse	Triple Mix
Bronze medal – third place	2022 Neom	Enduro

Sophie Coldwell (born 25 February 1995) is a British triathlete. She competed in the women's event at the 2018 Commonwealth Games. and has achieved several medals in International Triathlon Union (ITU) and European Triathlon Union (ETU) Championships. Sophie Coldwell is based in Loughborough, England. On the 26th June 2022, she won her 1st major medal when helping Team GB to Silver in the mixed team relay. She finished in third place in the 2022 Super League Triathlon Championship Series.

== Early life ==
Coldwell was born on 25 February 1995 in Gravesend, Kent but grew up in Keyworth, Nottingham.

Coldwell was a member of Charnwood Athletics Club and Nottingham Leander Swimming Club. She moved to Loughborough to attend university and graduated from Loughborough University in 2017 with a degree in Human Biology.

== Career ==
In 2012 Coldwell came fourth at the European Championships and was the National Champion and National Super Series champion. In 2013 she represented Team GB at the Australian Youth Olympic Festival winning mixed team relay bronze in Sydney.

In 2014, she finished fourth at the World Junior Championships.The 2017 triathlon season saw Coldwell win her first global medal, with bronze in the U23 event at the ITU World Triathlon Grand Final Rotterdam, and a fourth-place finish at the ITU World Triathlon Yokohama. She also finished second at the 2017 Kitzbühel ETU Triathlon European Championships.

Coldwell represented Team England at the 2018 Commonwealth Games on the Gold Coast finishing sixth in the elite women's individual race. She went on to win at the 2018 Tiszaujvaros ITU Triathlon World Cup and the 2018 Tartu ETU Triathlon European Championships. The 2019 season saw Coldwell win a gold medal at the 2019 Cagliari ITU Triathlon World Cup.

Coldwell was also part of the British Mixed Relay teams that won gold at the 2019 Accenture World Triathlon Mixed Relay Series Nottingham and silver in the ITU World Triathlon Mixed Relay Series Edmonton

Coldwell also participates in Super League Triathlon. She finished 5th in the 2019, 9th in 2021, and 3rd in 2022.

In the 2022 season, she has enjoyed top 5 finishes at 3 events, and is currently in 3rd in the overall standings.

She competed at the 2022 Commonwealth Games where she came 4th in the women's event.

== Competitions ==
The following list of results. Unless indicated otherwise, the competitions are triathlons (Olympic Distance).

Date	Competition	Rank
2019-08-31	ITU World Triathlon Grand Final Lausanne	13
2019-08-15	Tokyo ITU World Triathlon Olympic Qualification Event	9
2019-07-21	ITU World Triathlon Mixed Relay Series Edmonton	2
2019-07-20	ITU World Triathlon Edmonton	15
2019-07-06	Hamburg Wasser World Triathlon	14
2019-06-15	Accenture World Triathlon Mixed Relay Series Nottingham	1
2019-06-09	AJ Bell World Triathlon Leeds	9
2019-05-18	Cagliari ITU Triathlon World Cup	1
2019-05-05	Madrid ITU Triathlon World Cup	4
2018-09-16	ITU World Triathlon Grand Final Gold Coast Mixed U23 - Junior Relay	3
2018-09-15	ITU World Triathlon Grand Final Gold Coast	27
2018-08-25	ITU World Triathlon Montreal	24
2018-07-20	Tartu ETU Triathlon European Championships	1
2018-07-08	Tiszaujvaros ITU Triathlon World Cup	1
2018-06-10	ITU World Triathlon Leeds	12
2018-04-05	Gold Coast Commonwealth Games Elite Women	6
2018-03-02	ITU World Triathlon Abu Dhabi	26

DNF = Did not finish

DNS = Did not start

DSQ = Disqualified
