= Ashleigh Gentle =

Australian triathlete (born 1991)

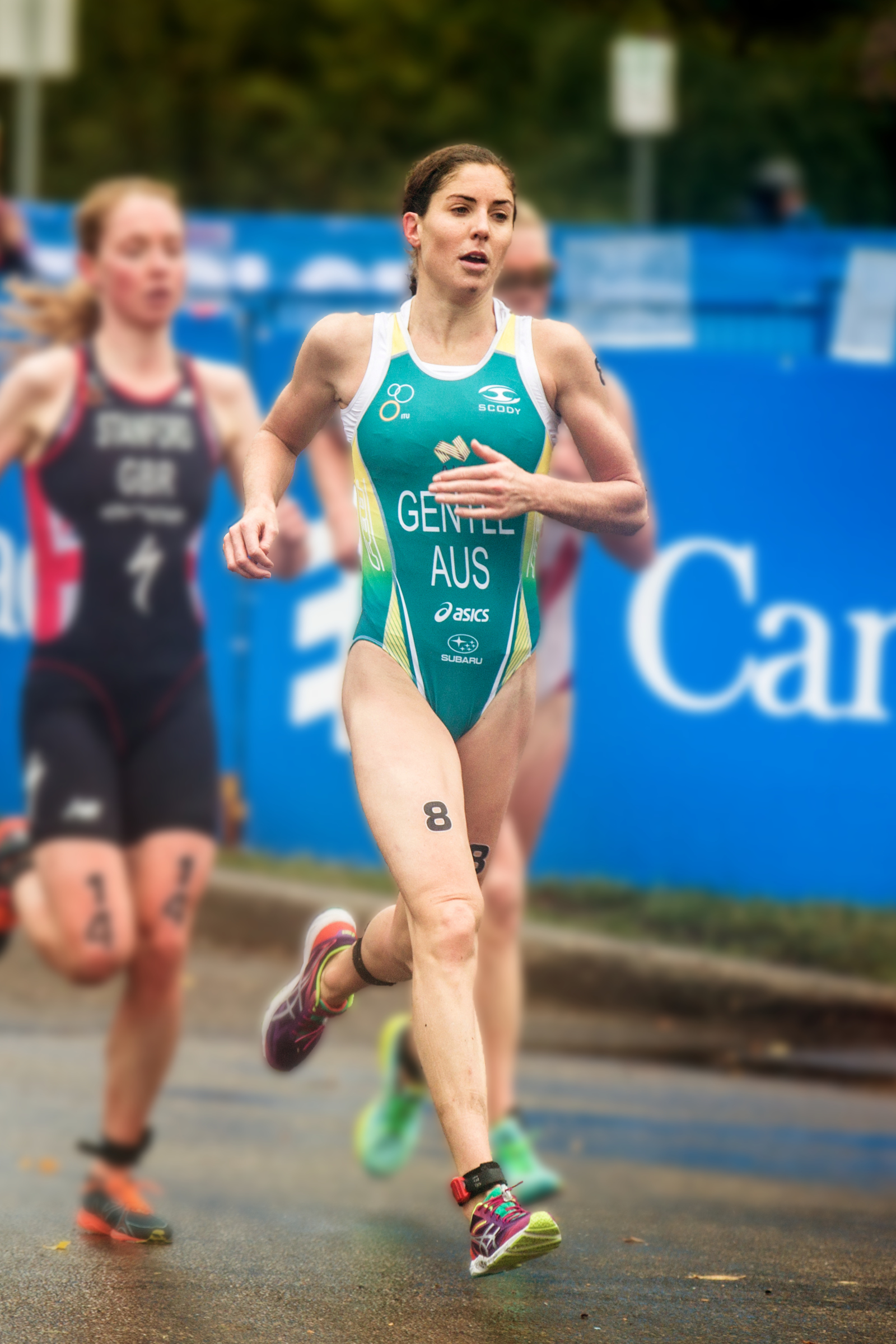
- Gentle at the ITU World Triathlon Series (2015)

Personal information
- Born: 25 February 1991 (age 35) South Brisbane, Australia
- Height: 170 cm (5 ft 7 in)
- Weight: 56 kg (123 lb)

Sport
- Country: Australia
- Coached by: Josh Amberger
Medal record
Women's triathlon
Representing Australia
World Championships
Silver medal – second place	2017	Elite
Gold medal – first place	2017 Hamburg	Mixed team relay
Commonwealth Games
Gold medal – first place	2018 Gold Coast	Mixed team relay
Ironman 70.3 World Championship
Bronze medal – third place	2024 Taupō	Individual

Ashleigh Gentle (born 25 February 1991) is an Australian triathlete who was selected as part of the team for the 2016 Summer Olympics in Rio de Janeiro. She took second overall in the 2017 ITU World Triathlon Series, her career best to date.

== Biography ==
Gentle was born in South Brisbane, Queensland, on 25 February 1991, but now lives on the Gold Coast. She has two brothers. She attended St Vincent's Primary School and All Saints Anglican School. In 2009, she entered Griffith University, where as of 2016, she is studying for a Bachelor of Public Health degree in nutrition. She has trained with the Australian Institute of Sport and the Queensland Academy of Sport. Her husband is long distance triathlete Josh Amberger.

At school, Gentle participated in many different sports, including touch football, netball, athletics and cross country running. In 2004, a family friend persuaded her to take up triathlon. Initially this was to improve her running times, but she soon found that she enjoyed the swimming and cycling too. She won silver at the Junior World Championships in Hamburg in 2007 and Vancouver in 2008 before winning in Budapest in 2010.

In 2011, she ran in her first ITU World Triathlon Series (WTS) event, and was placed ninth. She finished in 130th position in the 2010 ITU World Championship Series. In 2012 and 2013, she ran in ten WTS events, and was placed in the top ten in all of them. In years 2011—2014 Gentle placed in the final ITU series rankings at 24th, 15th, 7th, and 34th place.

In 2015, Gentle finished the year in 12th position in that year's ITU series while also placing first in the Escape from Alcatraz triathlon, a non-standard distance triathlon starting on Alcatraz island. In 2015 and 2016 she placed second at the ITU races in Yokohama in 2015 and 2016, as well as at the ITU race in Abu Dhabi in 2016. By May 2016, she was ranked third in the world which helped solidify the Australian Olympic Committee's selection of Gentle as one of three female triathletes who would represent Australia at the 2016 Summer Olympics in Rio de Janeiro, her first Olympics. Gentle would place 26th overall in the Olympic event. Gentle would then finish out the 2016 ITU World Triathlon Series with and overall series ranking of 10th place.

Gentle had her highest ITU series finish, placing year in 2nd overall in the 2017 ITU World Triathlon Series. The next year, at the final race of the 2018 season in Gold Coast, Gentle managed to distance her rivals Vicky Holland and Katie Zaferes on the run to finish first, with Holland winning the subsequent sprint with Zaferes for second place to take the 2018 ITU World Triathlon Series Grand Finale race. She finished the season in 6th position.

In 2019, Gentle took gold for the second time of competing in the Escape from Alcatraz triathlon, a non-standard distance triathlon starting on Alcatraz island.

== Notable performances ==
Year	Competition	Country	Position	Time	Source
2016	WTS Yokohama	Japan	15x	1h 57' 20"	
2016	WTS Abu Dhabi	United Arab Emirates	15x	1h 56' 18"	
2015	WTS Yokohama	Japan	15x	1h 58' 33"	
2015	Noosa Triathlon	Australia	15x	1h 59' 18"	
2014	5150 Philippines	Philippines	15x	2h 2' 0"	
2014	Noosa Triathlon	Australia	15x	1h 59' 10"	
2013	Noosa Triathlon	Australia	15x	Timing	
2012	OTU Triathlon Oceania Championships	Australia	15x	1h 57' 26"	
2012	ITU Triathlon World Cup – Tiszaújváros	Hungary	15x	0h 58' 39"	
2011	OTU Triathlon Oceania Championships	New Zealand	15x	2h 6' 5"	
2011	ITU Triathlon World Cup – Edmonton	Canada	15x	2h 0' 14"	
2011	Oceania Cup Mooloolaba	Australia	15x	2h 3' 25"	
2009	Asian Cup in Singapore	Singapore	15x	1h 54' 31"	
