= Rachel Klamer =

Dutch triathlete (born 1990)

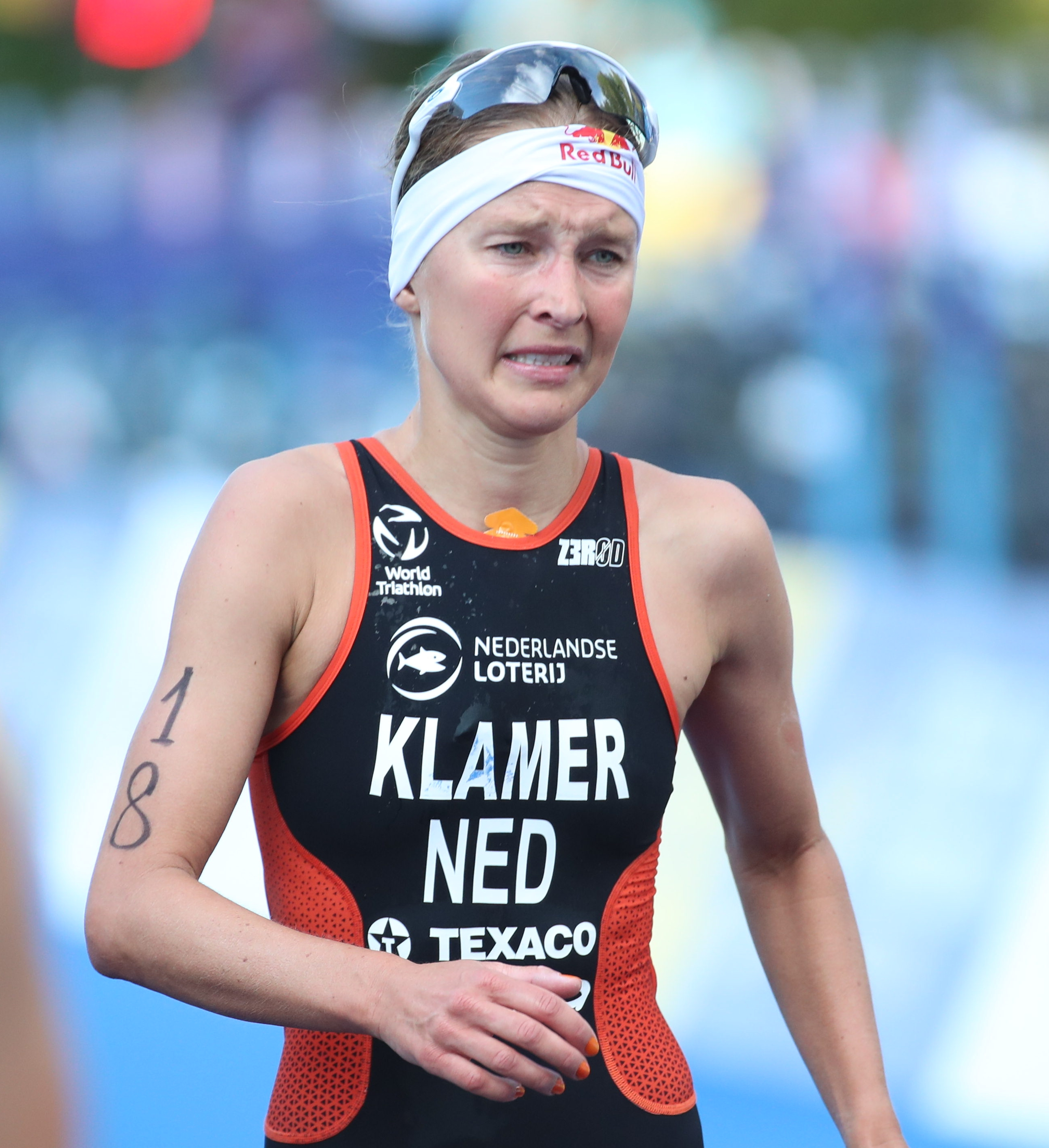
- Klamer, 2022

Personal information
- Nationality: Dutch
- Born: 8 October 1990 (age 35) Harare, Zimbabwe
- Height: 1.66 m (5 ft 5 in)
- Weight: 50 kg (110 lb)
- Spouse: Richard Murray

Sport
- Sport: Triathlon
Medal record
Women's Triathlon
Representing Netherlands
Super League Triathlon
Silver medal – second place	Rotterdam 2020	SLT Arena Games
Silver medal – second place	2019	Championship Series
Silver medal – second place	2018	Championship Series

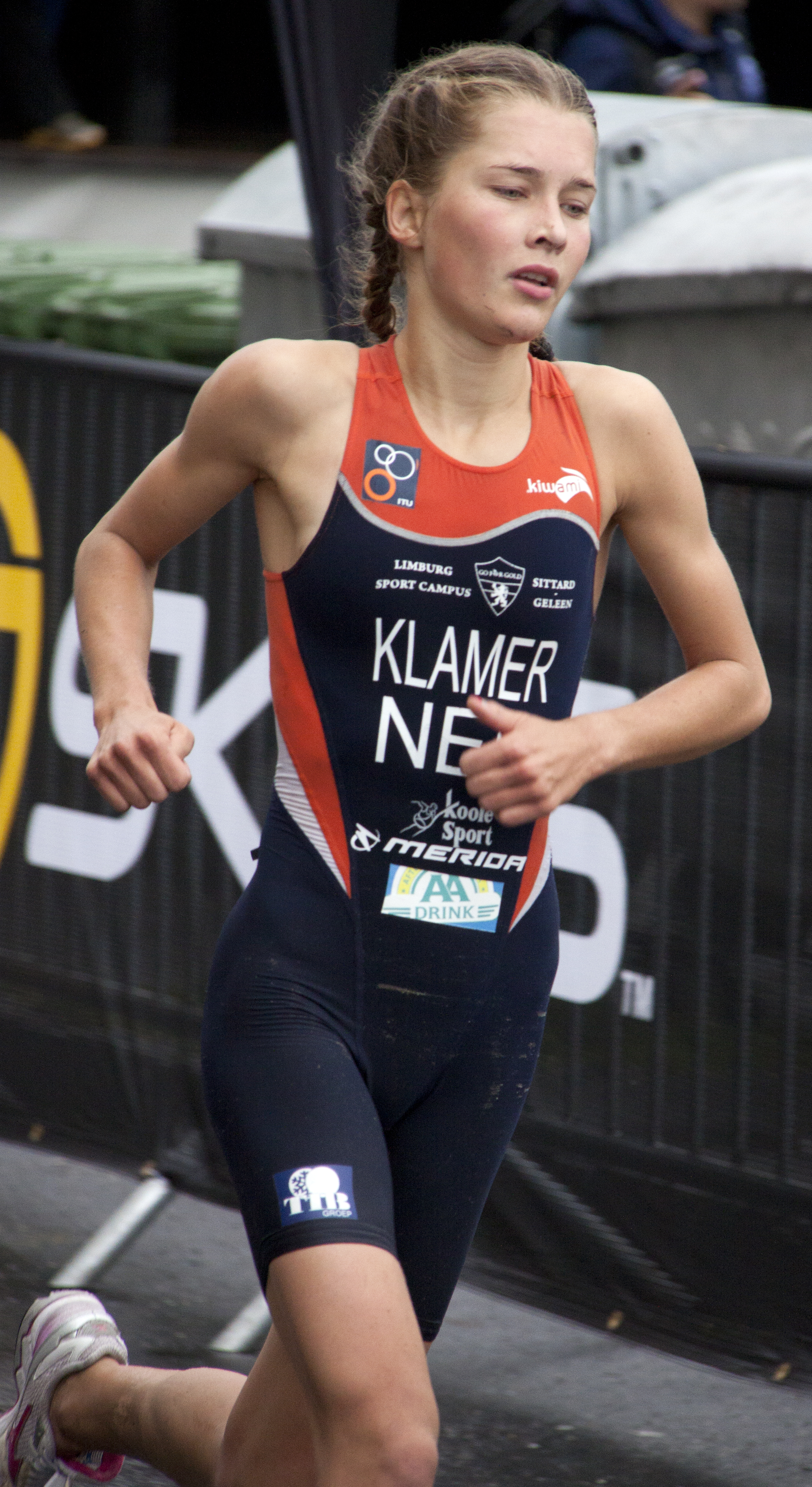
Rachel Klamer placing fourth at the U23 World Championships in Budapest, 2010.

Rachel Klamer (born 8 October 1990) is a Dutch professional triathlete and member of the National team. She placed third at the Junior World Championships in 2009.

Klamer, who presently lives in Sittard, entered the national and international stage in 2008 when she won both the National Triathlon Championships (Junior) in Aalsmeer and the Duathlon Championships (Junior) in Oss, placed 4th in the European Junior Cup at Holten, and, at the age of 17, also started to compete in the elite category, placing 10th in the British Corus Elite Series.

In 2009, she won the silver medal at the European Triathlon Championships in Holten (Junior) and the bronze medal at the Grand Final of the Dextro Energy World Championship Series (Junior). As a junior at the age of 18, she took part in two Premium European Cups and achieved top placements among the world elite triathletes. In Alanya, she won the gold medal, and in Eilat she placed fifth, hampered by technical problems with the bicycle chain.

Preparing for the Olympic Games in 2012, Klamer is supported by the club Pro Triathlon founded in 2008 and seems to concentrate exclusively on international events. In fact, her name does not appear in the National Triathlon Ranking of 2009 but she won the 3000m National Championships and in 2010 she is also sponsored by the triathlon section of the German club Krefelder Kanu Klub which she represents in the German championship series Bundesliga in 2010.

In French media, Klamer was announced to take part in the 2010 circuit of the prestigious French Club Championship Series Lyonnaise des Eaux representing the club Brive but she did not compete in any of the five triathlons.

Klamer is also part of the Dutch running club, LAAC Twente, for which she won a local German running competition in 2008 alongside her father, Marcel, and her mother, Karin. This was the year of her breakthrough, when she still lived in Denekamp.

She competed for the Netherlands at the 2012 and 2016 Summer Olympics, finishing in 36th and 10th position respectively.

Klamer also competes in Super League Triathlon. She was second in the Championship series in both 2018 and 2019, and finished 2nd at the Arena Games, Rotterdam in 2020.

In 2015, she won the silver medal in the women's triathlon event of the inaugural European Games in Baku, Azerbaijan.

== Career ==
=== 2008-2010 Seasons ===
Klamer raced her first race in the elite ranks (not junior) at the 2009 Alanya ITU Triathlon Premium European Cup, taking gold.

=== 2011 season ===
Klamer finished the year in 22nd place in the ITU World Triathlon Series rankings.

=== 2012 season ===
Klamer finished the year in 14th place in the ITU World Triathlon Series rankings.

=== 2013 season ===
Klamer finished the year in 38th place in the ITU World Triathlon Series rankings.

=== 2014 season ===
Klamer finished the year in 14th place in the ITU World Triathlon Series rankings.

=== 2015 season ===
Klamer finished the year in 6th place in the ITU World Triathlon Series rankings.

=== 2016 season ===
Klamer took her first career podium in the elite ITU World Triathlon Series with a silver at Hamburg.

The same year, she represented the Netherlands at her second Olympics in Rio de Janeiro, finishing 10th.

Klamer finished the year in 11th place in the ITU World Triathlon Series rankings.

=== 2017 season ===
Klamer finished the year in 8th place in the ITU World Triathlon Series rankings.

=== 2018 season ===
Klamer took her first ITU WTS race win with gold at Abu Dhabi, with the race contested over the sprint distance.

Klamer finished the year in 10th place in the ITU World Triathlon Series rankings.

=== 2019 season ===
Klamer finished the year in 6th place in the ITU World Triathlon Series rankings, a joint career best.

=== 2020 season ===
Due to the events of the COVID-19 pandemic, the majority of racing was suspended for the 2020 season.

=== 2021 season ===
In 2021, she competed in the women's event at the 2020 Summer Olympics in Tokyo, Japan. She also competed in the mixed relay event.

=== 2024 season ===
She competed in the women's triathlon at the 2024 Summer Olympics in Paris, France.

=== ITU competitions ===
The following list is based upon the official ITU rankings and the Athlete's Profile Page. Except for the Corus Elite event, all the following races are ITU triathlons. Unless indicated otherwise, the events are triathlons (Olympic Distance) and belong to the Elite category.

Date	Competition	Place	Rank
2008-05-10	European Championships (Junior)	Lisbon	26
2008-06-28	European Cup (Junior)	Holten	4
2008-09-07	Corus Elite Series	Glasgow	10
2009-07-05	European Championships (Junior)	Holten	2
2009-09-13	Dextro Energy World Championship Series, Grand Final (Junior)	Gold Coast	3
2009-10-25	Premium European Cup (Elite)	Alanya	1
2009-11-21	Premium European Cup	Eilat	5
2010-08-15	European Cup	Geneva	DNF
2010-08-21	World Championship (Sprint / Elite)	Lausanne	19
2010-09-11	World Championships (U23)	Budapest	4
2010-10-10	World Cup (Elite)	Huatulco	3
2010-10-24	Premium European Cup (Elite)	Alanya	1
2011-02-06	Oceania Cup (Sprint)	Kinloch	7

DNF = did not finish

== Personal life ==
Rachel is married to fellow triathlete Richard Murray.
