= Jess Learmonth =

English triathlete

Jess Learmonth MBE
Personal information
- Nationality: English
- Born: 18 April 1988 (age 38) Bramham, England

Sport
- Sport: Triathlon
Medal record
Women's triathlon
Representing Great Britain
Olympic Games
Gold medal – first place	2020 Tokyo	Mixed relay
World Triathlon Series - Overall
Silver medal – second place	2019 Lausanne	Elite
World Triathlon Series
Silver medal – second place	2019 Lausanne	Elite
Silver medal – second place	2019 Bermuda	Elite
Silver medal – second place	2018 Gold Coast	Elite
Silver medal – second place	2018 Abu Dhabi	Elite
Silver medal – second place	2017 Stockholm	Elite
Bronze medal – third place	2019 Montreal	Elite
Bronze medal – third place	2019 Leeds	Elite
Bronze medal – third place	2019 Abu Dhabi	Elite
Bronze medal – third place	2017 Rotterdam	Elite
European Championships
Gold medal – first place	2017 Kitzbühel	Individual
Silver medal – second place	2018 Glasgow	Individual
Representing England
Commonwealth Games
Silver medal – second place	2018 Gold Coast	Women's
Silver medal – second place	2018 Gold Coast	Mixed relay
Super League Triathlon
Gold medal – first place	Rotterdam 2020	SLT Arena Games
Silver medal – second place	2021	Championship Series
Bronze medal – third place	London 2022	Arena Games Triathlon

Jessica Learmonth (born 18 April 1988) is a British triathlete. Learmonth is a European, Commonwealth, Olympic and World Triathlon Series medal winner based in Leeds, England where she trains at the Leeds Triathlon Centre. She won the European Triathlon Championship in 2017 and took silver in 2018. She competed in the women's event and the mixed relay at the 2018 Commonwealth Games, winning silver medals in both disciplines. Learmonth won silver in the 2019 World Triathlon Series.

In 2021, Learmonth won the gold medal in the triathlon mixed relay at the 2020 Summer Olympics in Tokyo. She also finished second in the 2021 Super League Triathlon Championship Series.

== Early life ==
Learmonth won a National Championships freestyle medal whilst competing for the City of Leeds Swimming Club. She also played golf at Wetherby Golf Club and football for Leeds United Ladies Academy before switching to triathlon.

== Career ==
Learmonth's first year in triathlon was in 2012 and she was added to the World-Class Performance Squad in 2015. After just a couple of years of triathlon racing, Learmonth burst onto the Elite scene in 2016 with her first European Cup win. The 2017 triathlon season saw her win the ETU European title and secure two ITU World Triathlon Series podium finishes with a silver medal at ITU World Triathlon Stockholm and a bronze medal at ITU World Triathlon Grand Final Rotterdam.

Learmonth represented Team England at the 2018 Gold Coast Commonwealth Games, winning a silver medal in both the individual and mixed relay event at her first major multi-sport games. During the same year, she secured a European Championship silver medal at Glasgow and finished 5th overall in the World Triathlon Series.

She enjoyed a number of successes in 2019 with a second-place finish at MS Amlin World Triathlon Bermuda and third-place finishes at AJ Bell World Triathlon Leeds and Groupe Copley World Triathlon Montreal. However, her greatest achievement of the year was a silver medal in the ITU World Triathlon Grand Final at Lausanne.

Learmonth was also part of the British Mixed Relay teams that won silver in the 2019 ITU World Triathlon Mixed Relay Series Tokyo. In 2020, Learmonth won the inaugural edition of Super League Triathlon Arena Games, held in Rotterdam. She finished in 3rd place at Arena Games Triathlon London in 2022, finishing behind Cassandre Beaugrand and Beth Potter.

In 2021, Learmonth was part of the gold medal–winning triathlon mixed relay team, at the 2020 Summer Olympics in Tokyo. She also finished 2nd in the 2021 Super League Triathlon Championship Series. Despite winning 3 of the 4 Championship Series races, her 4th place finish at the series finale in Malibu, was not enough to deny Georgia Taylor-Brown the overall victory.

Learmonth was appointed a Member of the Order of the British Empire (MBE) in the 2022 New Year Honours for services to triathlon.
