= Joanna Brown =

Canadian triathlete (born 1992)

Personal information
- Born: November 12, 1992 (age 34) Carp, Ontario, Canada
- Height: 178 cm (5 ft 10 in)
Medal record
Women's triathlon
Representing Canada
Commonwealth Games
Bronze medal – third place	2018 Gold Coast	Women's individual

Joanna Brown (born November 12, 1992) is a Canadian triathlete. Brown has been part of the Canadian national team since 2011.

== Career ==
At the 2015 Pan American Games in Toronto, Brown finished in 13th position. Brown competed at the 2018 Commonwealth Games, and won the bronze medal in the individual race, the first medal for Canada at the games. She later finished fourth in the mixed relay.

In July 2021, Brown was named to Canada's 2020 Olympic team.
