= Richard Murray (triathlete) =

Dutch triathlete

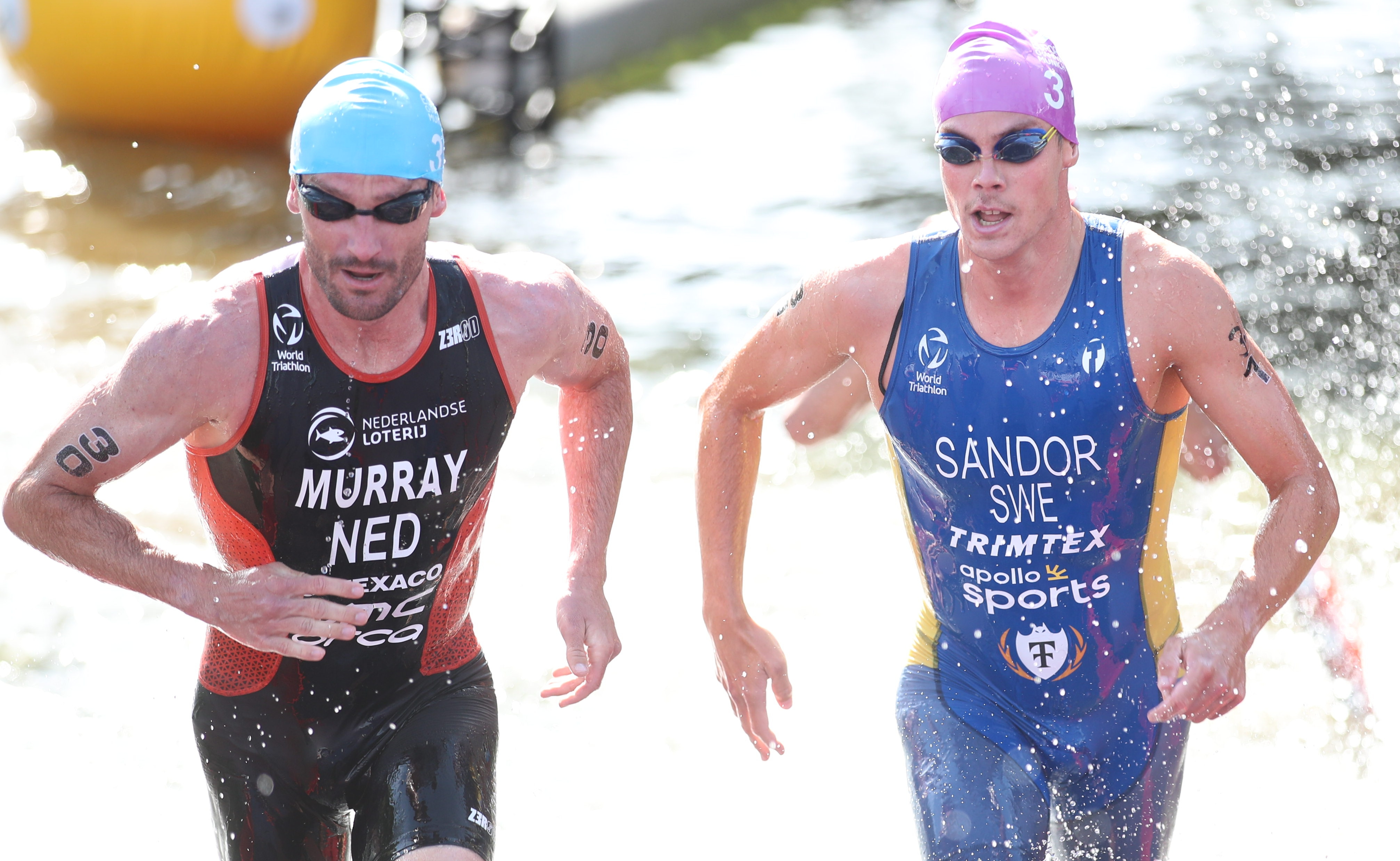
- Richard Murray and Gabriel Sandör in 2022

Personal information
- Nationality: Dutch
- Born: 4 January 1989 (age 37) Cape Town, South Africa
- Spouse: Rachel Klamer

Sport
- Sport: Triathlon
Medal record
Representing South Africa
Triathlon
Commonwealth Games
| Silver medal – second place | 2014 Glasgow | Mixed relay |
Men's Duathlon
World Championships
| Gold medal – first place | 2016 Aviles | Individual |

Richard Murray (born 4 January 1989, in Cape Town) is a Dutch International Triathlete and coach.

Murray won the Junior ITU Duathlon World Championships in 2007 and 2008, entered the adult triathlon in 2009, and was the Under-23 African champion in both triathlon and duathlon in 2010, and was the elite African triathlon champion in 2011 and 2012. He scored his first win in the ITU World Triathlon Series in Hamburg in 2012.

At the 2012 Summer Olympics men's triathlon on Tuesday, 7 August, he placed 17th.

In 2014-2015, he was part of ECS Triathlon, an elite club based in Sartrouville, France. At the 2014 Commonwealth Games, he won a silver medal in the mixed team relay and a bronze in the men's triathlon.

He won the Gran Final of the World Triathlon Series (WTS) in Chicago in 2015.

He won the ITU Duathlon World Championships in Asturias (Spain) in 2016.

At the 2016 Summer Olympics men's triathlon on Thursday, 18 August, he placed 4th.

== Career ==
=== 2012 season ===
Murray took his first professional ITU World Triathlon Series win at the Dextro Energy World Triathlon Hamburg, contested over the Sprint distance.

=== 2013 season ===
Murray took his sole win of the season with a gold at the Cape Town ITU Sprint Triathlon African Cup.

=== 2014 season ===
Murray took his sole win of the season with a gold at the Cape Town ATU Sprint Triathlon African Cup.

=== 2015 season ===
Murray took gold in two ITU World Cup races this season at New Plymouth and Cozumel, and took the win at the ITU WTS Edmonton race

=== 2016 season ===
Murray followed up his win in 2015 with a repeat win at New Plymouth in the 2016 season. Later the same year he became ITU Duathlon World Champion with a win at Aviles.

=== 2017 season ===
Murray repeated the wins of previous seasons taking gold at New Plymouth and Cape Town in those ITU World Cup races, with New Plymouth being his third win in a row.

=== 2018 season ===
Murray took his first win of the year at Cape Town Triathlon World Cup, followed by a win at Mooloolaba Triathlon World Cup, and a third win of the year at the ITU WTS Leeds on 10 June 2018.

== Personal life ==
Richard is married to fellow professional triathlete Rachel Klamer.
