= Kirsten Kasper =

American professional triathlete

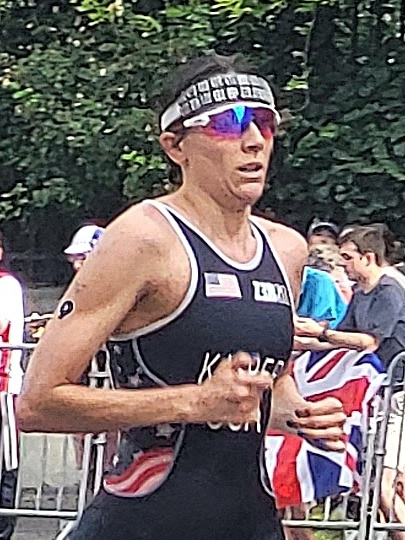
Paris 2024

Kirsten Kasper is an American professional triathlete. She competed in the women's triathlon at the 2024 Summer Olympics in Paris, France.

== College career ==
She was a cross country runner for the Georgetown Hoyas.

== Professional career ==
=== 2016 season ===
She won world championship gold in the mixed relay.

Kasper won her first World Cup event in Salinas, Ecuador.

=== 2017 season ===
Kasper finished 4th in the 2017 ITU World Triathlon Series rankings by virtue of a 4th-place finish in the Finale. This final ranking was highlighted by her first WTS podium, a third in Yokohama.
