= Triathlon at the 2020 Summer Olympics – Qualification =

This article details the qualifying phase for triathlon at the 2020 Summer Olympics (postponed to 2021 due to the COVID-19 pandemic). The competition at these Games will comprise a total of 110 athletes coming from their respective NOCs; each has been allowed to enter a maximum of three. All athletes must undergo a qualifying process to earn a spot for the Games through the Continental Qualification Events, the World Qualification Event, and then the Olympic Qualification List that began on May 11, 2018, and then concludes two years later on the same date.

== Summary ==
Ten NOCs will each earn four quota spots (two per gender) through mixed team qualification. The top seven NOCs in the ITU mixed relay rankings of 31 March 2020 will qualify. NOCs other than those seven can participate in the 2020 ITU Mixed Relay Olympic Qualification Event, with three more teams earning Olympic quota places through that competition. This ensures a minimum field of ten teams in the mixed relay.

The individual rankings of 11 May 2020 will provide quota spots to 31 athletes in each gender. The first 26 spots will go sequentially to the best ranked athletes, subject to a limit of three per NOC (if all three are in the top 30) or two per NOC (if the third would be outside the top 30). For the purposes of this allocation, any NOC that qualified through mixed relay (and thus already has two quota places in each gender) must ignore its two highest-ranked competitors in each gender. Five additional spots will be awarded by continent, to the best-ranked remaining athlete from that continent whose NOC has not already qualified any quota places. A team that qualifies two individuals in both the men's and women's events will then be eligible to join the ten previously qualified teams in the mixed relay event. In 2021, seven further teams achieved at least two quotas in both events, and thus also qualified for mixed relay.

Two places per gender are reserved for the host, Japan. Two final places in each gender are awarded by Tripartite Commission invitation.

NOC	Men	Women	Mixed	Total
Argentina		1		1
Australia	3	3	Yes	6
Austria	2	2	Yes	4
Azerbaijan	1			1
Belgium	2	2	Yes	4
Bermuda		1		1
Brazil	1	2		3
Canada	2	2	Yes	4
Chile	1	1		2
China		1		1
Czech Republic		2		2
Ecuador		1		1
Egypt		1		1
Estonia		1		1
France	3	2	Yes	5
Germany	2	2	Yes	4
Great Britain	2	3	Yes	5
Hong Kong	1			1
Hungary	2	2	Yes	4
Ireland	1	1		2
Israel	2			2
Italy	2	3	Yes	5
Japan	2	2	Yes	4
Luxembourg	1			1
Mexico	2	2	Yes	4
Morocco	1			1
Netherlands	2	2	Yes	4
New Zealand	2	2	Yes	4
Norway	3	1		4
Portugal	2	1		3
ROC	2	2	Yes	4
Romania	1			1
South Africa	2	2	Yes	4
Spain	3	2	Yes	5
Switzerland	2	2	Yes	4
Syria	1			1
Ukraine		1		1
United States	2	3	Yes	5
Total: 38 NOCs	55	55	18	110

== Timeline ==
Event	Date	Venue
Mixed relay ranking	March 12, 2020	—
2021 ITU Mixed Relay Olympic Qualification Event	May 21, 2021	(Portugal) Lisbon
Cut-off for individual rankings	June 15, 2021	—

== Men's event ==
Event	Places	Qualified NOC	Selected triathlete
Mixed relay rankings	14	France	Vincent Luis
Mixed relay rankings	14	France	Dorian Coninx
Mixed relay rankings	14	Australia	Jacob Birtwhistle
Mixed relay rankings	14	Australia	Aaron Royle
Mixed relay rankings	14	Great Britain	Jonathan Brownlee
Mixed relay rankings	14	Great Britain	Alex Yee
Mixed relay rankings	14	New Zealand	Hayden Wilde
Mixed relay rankings	14	New Zealand	Tayler Reid
Mixed relay rankings	14	Germany	Jonas Schomburg
Mixed relay rankings	14	Germany	Justus Nieschlag
Mixed relay rankings	14	Netherlands	Marco Van Der Stel
Mixed relay rankings	14	Netherlands	Jorik Van Egdom
Mixed relay rankings	14	United States	Morgan Pearson
Mixed relay rankings	14	United States	Kevin McDowell
Mixed relay event	6	Belgium	Jelle Geens
Mixed relay event	6	Belgium	Marten van Riel
Mixed relay event	6	Italy	Gianluca Pozzatti
Mixed relay event	6	Italy	Delian Stateff
Mixed relay event	6	Switzerland	Max Studer
Mixed relay event	6	Switzerland	Andrea Salvisberg
Individual ranking – World	25	Spain	Javier Gómez Noya
Individual ranking – World	25	Norway	Kristian Blummenfelt
Individual ranking – World	25	Spain	Mario Mola
Individual ranking – World	25	South Africa	Henri Shoeman
Individual ranking – World	25	Canada	Tyler Mislawchuk
Individual ranking – World	25	Norway	Gustav Iden
Individual ranking – World	25	Hungary	Bence Bicsák
Individual ranking – World	25	South Africa	Richard Murray
Individual ranking – World	25	France	Léo Bergère
Individual ranking – World	25	Spain	Fernando Alarza
Individual ranking – World	25	Austria	Alois Knabl
Individual ranking – World	25	Norway	Casper Stornes
Individual ranking – World	25	Portugal	Joao Pereira
Individual ranking – World	25	Portugal	Joao Silva
Individual ranking – World	25	Australia	Matthew Hauser
Individual ranking – World	25	Mexico	Crisanto Grajales
Individual ranking – World	25	~~Denmark~~	xxx
Individual ranking – World	25	Brazil	Manoel Messias
Individual ranking – World	25	Israel	Shachar Sagiv
Individual ranking – World	25	Canada	Matthew Sharpe
Individual ranking – World	25	Mexico	Irving Pérez
Individual ranking – World	25	Azerbaijan	Rostyslav Pevtsov
Individual ranking – World	25	Austria	Lukas Hollaus
Individual ranking – World	25	ROC	Dmitry Polyanski
Individual ranking – World	25	Israel	Ran Sagiv
Individual ranking – World	25	Hungary	Tamás Tóth
Individual ranking – Africa	1	Morocco	Mehdi Essadiq
Individual ranking – Americas	1	Chile	Diego Moya
Individual ranking – Asia	1	Hong Kong	Oscar Coggins
Individual ranking – Europe	1	Romania	Felix Duchampt
Individual ranking – Oceania	0	None eligible	xxx
Host nation	2	Japan	Kenji Nener
Host nation	2	Japan	Makoto Odakura
Tripartite Commission	1	Syria	Mohamad Maso
Tripartite Commission	1	Not allocated	xxx
Reallocation	3	Luxembourg	Stefan Zachäus
Reallocation	3	Ireland	Russell White
Reallocation	3	ROC	Igor Polyanski
Total	55		

== Women's event ==
Event	Places	Qualified NOC	Selected triathlete
Mixed relay rankings	14	France	Cassandre Beaugrand; Léonie Périault
Mixed relay rankings	14	Australia	Ashleigh Gentle; Jaz Hedgeland
Mixed relay rankings	14	Great Britain	Jess Learmonth; Georgia Taylor-Brown
Mixed relay rankings	14	New Zealand	Ainsley Thorpe; Nicole van der Kaay
Mixed relay rankings	14	Germany	Laura Lindemann; Anabel Knoll
Mixed relay rankings	14	Netherlands	Maya Kingma; Rachel Klamer
Mixed relay rankings	14	United States	Katie Zaferes; Summer Rappaport
Mixed relay event	6	Belgium	Valerie Barthelemy; Claire Michel
Mixed relay event	6	Italy	Angelica Olmo; Alice Betto
Mixed relay event	6	Switzerland	Nicola Spirig; Jolanda Annen
Individual ranking – World	26	Great Britain	Vicki Holland
Individual ranking – World	26	United States	Taylor Knibb
Individual ranking – World	26	Austria	Lisa Perterer
Individual ranking – World	26	Czech Republic	Vendula Frintová
Individual ranking – World	26	Bermuda	Flora Duffy
Individual ranking – World	26	Canada	Joanna Brown
Individual ranking – World	26	Spain	Miriam Casillas
Individual ranking – World	26	Italy	Verena Steinhauser
Individual ranking – World	26	Brazil	Vittória Lopes
Individual ranking – World	26	Australia	Emma Jeffcoat
Individual ranking – World	26	Austria	Julia Hauser
Individual ranking – World	26	Norway	Lotte Miller
Individual ranking – World	26	Brazil	Luisa Baptista
Individual ranking – World	26	Ukraine	~~Yuliya Yelistratova~~
Individual ranking – World	26	Spain	Anna Godoy
Individual ranking – World	26	Portugal	Melanie Santos
Individual ranking – World	26	ROC	Alexandra Razarenova
Individual ranking – World	26	Mexico	Cecilia Pérez
Individual ranking – World	26	Hungary	Zsanett Bragmayer
Individual ranking – World	26	Estonia	Kaidi Kivioja
Individual ranking – World	26	South Africa	Simone Ackermann
Individual ranking – World	26	Hungary	Zsófia Kovács
Individual ranking – World	26	Chile	Bárbara Riveros
Individual ranking – World	26	Mexico	Claudia Rivas
Individual ranking – World	26	Czech Republic	Petra Kuříková
Individual ranking – World	26	Ecuador	Elizabeth Bravo
Individual ranking – Africa	1	Egypt	Basmla ElSalamoney
Individual ranking – Americas	1	Argentina	Romina Biagioli
Individual ranking – Asia	1	China	Zhong Mengying
Individual ranking – Europe	1	Ireland	Carolyn Hayes
Individual ranking – Oceania	0	None eligible	xxx
Host nation	2	Japan	Yuko Takahashi; Niina Kishimoto
Tripartite Commission	0	Not allocated	xxx,xxx
Reallocation	3	ROC	Anastasia Gorbunova
Reallocation	3	Canada	Amélie Kretz
Reallocation	3	South Africa	Gillian Sanders
Total	55		
