= 2021 World Triathlon Championship Series =

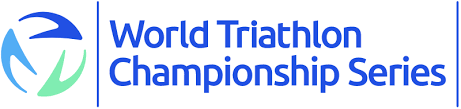
- League: ITU World Triathlon Series
- Sport: Triathlon

Men's Series
- Series Champion: Kristian Blummenfelt (NOR)
- Points: 3927

Women's Series
- Series Champion: Flora Duffy (BER)
- Points: 3861

World Triathlon Championship Series seasons
- 2020 2022

The 2021 World Triathlon Championship Series was the 13th season of the World Triathlon Championship Series, the top level international series for triathlon, since its establishment in 2009. The season consisted of four pairs of triathlon races for both a men's and women's competition, beginning on May 15 in Yokohama, and concluding on August 21 with the grand final in Edmonton. The series calendar also included the 2020 Summer Olympics individual races on July 26 and 27 and mixed relay event on July 31.

Vincent Luis and Georgia Taylor-Brown began the season as defending champions from the 2020 season. Less than a month after their victories at the Olympics, Kristian Blummenfelt and Flora Duffy were crowned the series champions, becoming the first athletes to earn Olympic gold medals and World Triathlon Championship titles within the same year.

== Overview ==
=== Calendar ===
The 2021 World Triathlon Championship Series visited five cities, including Tokyo for the 2020 Olympics.

Events
Date	Location	Type
May 15	(Japan) Yokohama	Standard
June 6	(United Kingdom) Leeds	Standard
July 26–27	(Japan) Tokyo	Standard (Olympics)
August 13–15	(Canada) Montreal	Eliminator
August 21	(Canada) Edmonton	Standard (Grand Final)

Mixed Relays
Date	Location	Type
July 31	(Japan) Tokyo	Mixed Relay (Olympics)
August 15	(Canada) Montreal	Mixed Relay

=== Background ===
On October 1, 2020, ITU announced that it would take on its new brand identity as World Triathlon, following 31 years as the International Triathlon Union. This included the renaming of every continental triathlon organization and the ITU World Triathlon Series, which became the World Triathlon Championship Series.

In addition to the rebranding, World Triathlon introduced a new format- the “Eliminator”- which consisted of multiple races over the super-sprint distance (300m swim, 6 km bike, 1.5 km run). The event would follow a McIntyre system-like format over the course of two days, in which athletes would need to secure a top-10 finish in their respective heat in order to advance to the next round.

Due to the COVID-19 pandemic, there were multiple changes to the series calendar. The World Triathlon Championship Series event in Abu Dhabi, traditionally the first race of the world triathlon season, was moved to November 5–6 in order to allow for travel restrictions to ease. Due to it being scheduled after the grand final in Edmonton, World Triathlon later made the decision to designate the event as a race in the 2022 series. The series event in Hamburg was also postponed after the grand final, with new dates of September 18–19 instead of July 10–11. Bermuda was initially set to host eliminator and mixed relay events from October 15–17, and similar to the Abu Dhabi and Hamburg events, would count for 2022 series rankings points. A month before the planned race date, however, the race was cancelled due to a spike in COVID-19 infections.

=== Point system ===
For every race an athlete finished they were awarded points based on their position across the line. For a World Triathlon Championship Series event and the Olympic Games the winner was awarded 1000 points with every athlete finishing afterwards being awarded with 7.5% less points. For the grand final 1250 points were awarded, and every subsequent place was awarded 7.5% less. If any athlete finished outside of the cut-off time, they would earn zero points regardless of finishing position. The cut-off times for each event was determined by adding 5% to the men's winner's time and 8% to the women's winner's time. An athlete's final score was determined by adding their 3 best scores in the World Series events and/or Olympic Games plus their score in the grand final, for a maximum of 4 scored races.

== Series ==
=== Yokohama ===
The 2021 series opener took place in Yokohama over a standard-distance course. The 1500m swim consisted of two 750m laps near the Port of Yokohama before leading into the transition area next to Yamashita Park. Athletes then completed nine laps of 4.45 km each for a total distance of 40 km, and four laps of the 2.5 km course for a 10 km run finishing in the park.

==== Men ====
The start list for the men's race included numerous big names including defending series champion Vincent Luis and 2016 Olympics gold medalist Alistair Brownlee. Luis was the first athlete to finish the swim, followed closely by Marten Van Riel, Richard Varga and several other athletes. With minimal distance between athletes coming out of T1, a huge pack formed on the bike. For the entirety of the cycling segment, major breakaways, and a giant lead group of athletes entered T2. In the early stages of the run, a 4-man group consisting of Jonas Schomburg, Jelle Geens, Kristian Blummenfelt and Alex Yee initiated a breakaway. The group eventually settled down to just Blummenfelt and Geens in the final lap, with Yee and Morgan Pearson battling for the bronze medal. The race was won by Blummenfelt, who unleashed a final surge to take the gold ahead of Geens. Pearson closed out the top 3, climbing 35 places on the run to secure his first WTCS podium and a spot at the Olympics.

==== Women ====
Although the first lap of the swim was primarily dominated by Portuguese athlete Helena Carvalho, it was Summer Rappaport who ultimately finished the swim first with Carvalho close behind. Initially, a group of 10 athletes left T1 together to head out on the first lap of the bike, which soon grew to a 15-athlete pack. However, the focus of the race shifted to Maya Kingma and 2018 U23 World Champion Taylor Knibb, who broke away from the rest of the athletes and built a lead over the course of the first few kilometers. Their lead over the peloton increased every lap, eventually granting them a 2-minute advantage over the rest of the athletes in the field. The remainder of the race was dominated by Knibb, while Summer Rappaport overtook Kingma in the final lap to secure the silver medal. Knibb guaranteed her spot at the Olympics with her win, while Kingma secured her first WTCS podium of her career.

=== Leeds ===
The second race of the races was held in Leeds on a standard-distance course. Athletes started by completing two 750m laps in the lake at Roundhay Park before heading on the bike, which consisted of nine laps of 4.21 km each for a total distance of 37.9 km. Unlike previous years, when the bike course lead athletes to the second transition area at the Leeds city center, the 2021 course had a single transition area in the park. The run started with an 800m connection followed by four 2.3 km laps for a total distance of 10 km.

==== Men ====
Kristian Blummenfelt wore the number one as the series leader and placed himself in the starting to the left of the pontoon, setting himself up for what should have been the shortest path to the first buoy. However, he ended up in a group that swam slightly off course and subsequently lost time. Alistair Brownlee was charged with a ducking penalty during an incident between him and American Chase McQueen, leading to his disqualification. Richard Varga was also disqualified during the swim for not taking the correct path around a buoy. The initial stages of the bike were dominated by a group of eight athletes, which grew to 21 by the third lap. A few athletes made attempts to break away from the lead pack to no avail, retaining 15-20 second gaps over the group before the leads diminished. Although the competitors were clustered together for the first part of the run, Alex Yee broke away and maintained a lead for the rest of the race. With a run split of 29:46, Yee earned his first WTCS win, 25 seconds ahead of Morgan Pearson; and the final podium spot was claimed by Marten Van Riel.

==== Women ====
3-time Ironman World Championship runner-up Lucy Charles-Barclay made her professional short course debut at Leeds, eventually leading the race at the conclusion of the swim segment. She was joined by athletes including Maya Kingma, Jessica Learmonth and Sophie Coldwell, forming a pack of six athletes with a lead of 30 seconds over the rest of the field. The lead group soon whittled down to Kingma, Learmonth and Coldwell, whose lead increased to nearly 90 seconds over the rest of the second pack after the third lap. The gap between the groups kept steadily increasing over the course of the bike, eventually growing to 2 minutes by the end of the bike. Kingma and Learmonth remained close to each other after T2 while Coldwell dropped back, eventually securing a third-place finish. The two leaders remained neck-and-neck until the final 500m, where Kingma broke away uncontested to secure her first WTCS victory, while Learmonth claimed the silver medal.

=== Tokyo ===
The triathlon events for the 2020 Summer Olympics took place at Odaiba Marine Park in Tokyo. The men's and women's events would be held over a standard-distance course, starting with a 1500m swim consisting of two laps of 950m and 550m each. The 40 km bike was held over eight laps of 5 km each, with multiple 90- and 180-degree turns on every lap. The race concluded with a four-lap course of 2.5 km per lap, finishing right next to the transition area.

The mixed relay event made its Olympic debut at Tokyo, following a female-male-female-male format. Each athlete swam 300m, biked two 3.4 km laps for 6.8 km total, and ran 2 km before handing off to the next athlete or finishing.

==== Men ====
The first triathlon event of the Olympics began with an invalid start caused by a media boat blocking some of the competitors. Approximately 51 athletes dove in before being called back to restart. At the end of the first lap of the swim, Vincent Luis held the lead and continued to do so for the last 550m. A pack of five athletes lead the race exiting T1, eventually growing to nine. Halfway into the race, the chase pack caught up with the leaders, with only 10 seconds separating the top 39 athletes. Andrea Salvisberg broke away from the pack and held a 20-second lead over the peloton with one lap to go, though the lead decreased to 14 seconds after T2. Alex Yee soon took control of the race, followed closely by Hayden Wilde and Kristian Blummenfelt. In the final lap it came down to Yee and Blummenfelt, the latter laying down one final sprint with 1 km to go to secure the Olympic title. Yee finished 11 seconds later, with Wilde closing out the podium.

==== Women ====
In the hours leading up to the race, heavy rain remained a challenge for the athletes, eventually letting up to a drizzle at the start of the race. Right from the start of the race, Jessica Learmonth held a lead over the rest of the field and maintained it for the rest of the swim. She was joined by six other athletes, forming a pack that had a 60-second lead over the 14-athlete peloton at the end of the first lap. The lead group maintained their gap over the chasers, gradually decreasing in size until the end of the bike segment, with four athletes leading the race to start the run. Flora Duffy separated herself from the rest of the field within the first kilometer, while Georgia Taylor-Brown- who slowed down from a flat tire at the end of the bike- eventually made her way back to the top 3. At the halfway mark Katie Zaferes and Taylor-Brown battled for the silver medal, still 47 seconds behind Duffy. In the end it was Taylor-Brown who claimed the second place spot over Zaferes, while Duffy finished with a 74-second gap to secure the first-ever gold medal for Bermuda.

==== Mixed relay ====
64 athletes representing 16 countries raced in the mixed relay event a few days after the individual events. At the end of the first swim segment, it was Katie Zaferes (USA), Jessica Learmonth (GBR), Maya Kingma (NED), Laura Lindemann (GER) and Emma Jeffcoat (AUS) in the lead, the first four of whom forming a lead pack on the first lap of the bike. They maintained a lead of 26 seconds over the chasers entering T2, with Learmonth and Zaferes in the front. After the first exchange, it was Johnathan Brownlee (GBR) in front, followed by Jonas Schomburg (GER), Kevin McDowell (USA) and Marco Van Der Stel (NED). Brownlee's lead over the chasers opened to 10 seconds at the start of the run, maintaining his lead before tagging off to Georgia Taylor-Brown (GBR). The chasers consisted of four athletes, though Taylor Knibb (USA) eventually broke away from the pack. After T2 Taylor-Brown remained in the lead 11 seconds clear of Knibb, with four athletes chasing for the last spot on the podium. At the end of the run the lead grew to 14 seconds, while Knibb remained 35 seconds in front of Cassandre Beaugrand (FRA). Alex Yee (GBR) anchored the British team, with Morgan Pearson (USA) and Vincent Luis (FRA) in pursuit. Luis took the lead on the second lap of the bike, but was subsequently overtaken after T2. Yee's gap over the other athletes grew as Luis held a 5-second gap over Pearson, only for his advantage to diminish. Yee took the win for Great Britain with Pearson securing a silver medal for the United States and Luis earning France the bronze.

=== Montreal ===
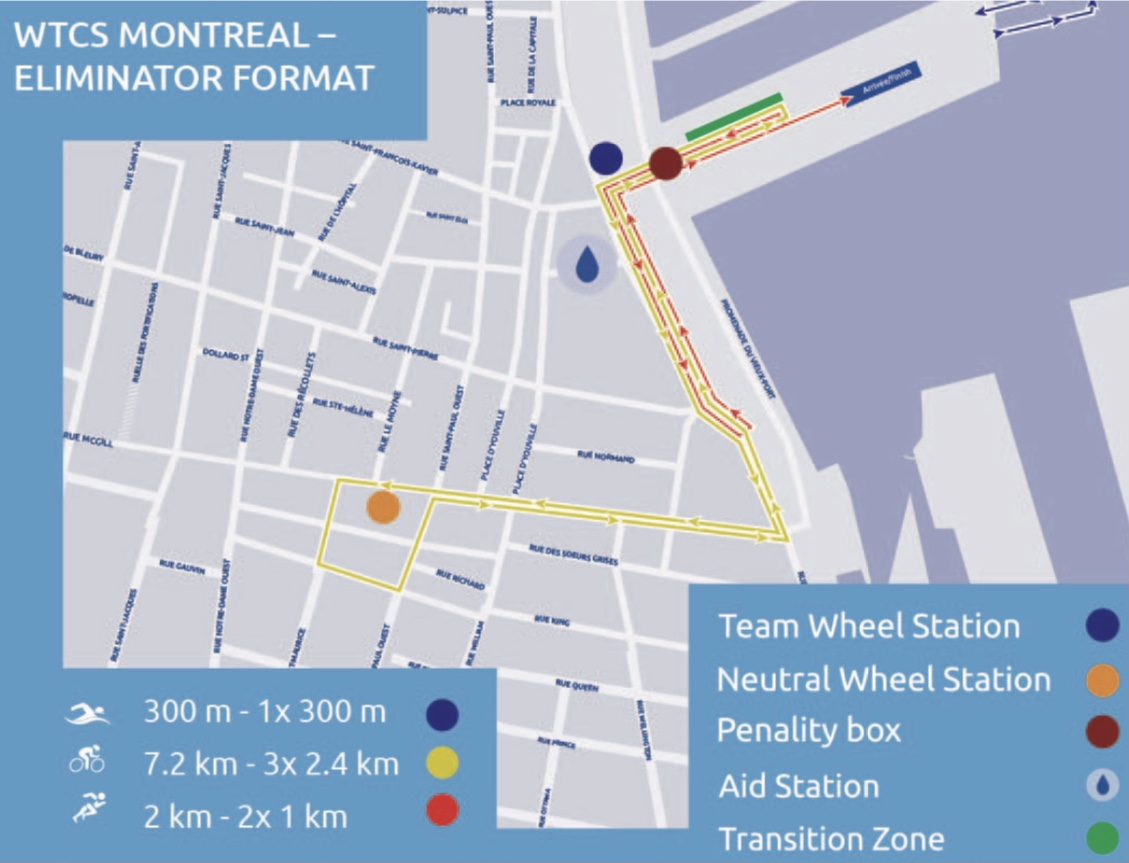
Official Course Map for the Montreal Eliminator events

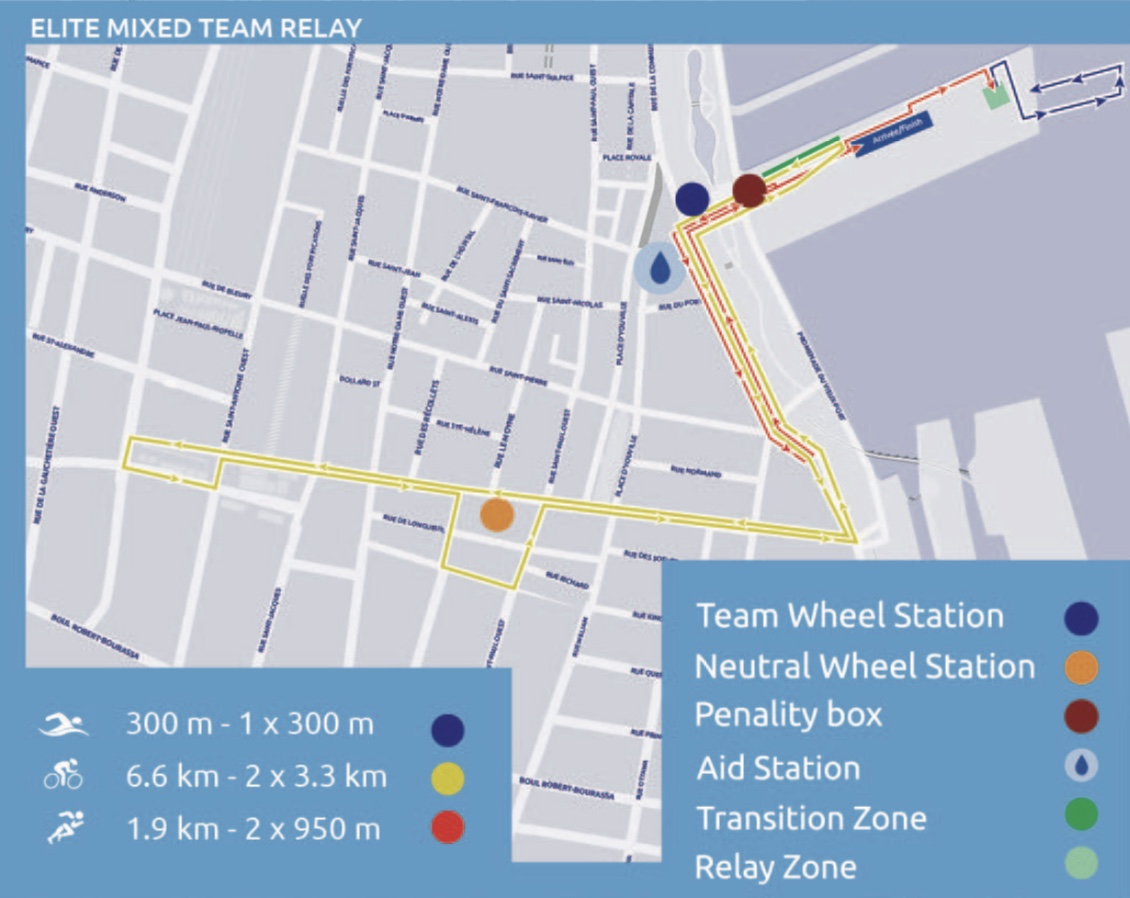
Official Course Map for the Montreal Mixed Relay event

The eliminator format made its debut at Montreal, consisting of six total races each for men and women over two days. Two qualifying heats were held on the first day, with the top 10 athletes from each heat automatically advancing to the final. The remaining athletes raced again in a repechage heat, from which 10 athletes qualified for the final. On the second day, three heats were held for the final; 30 athletes started in the first heat from which the top 20 advanced to the second heat, and after the second heat the top 10 athletes competed for a spot on the podium. Each heat consisted of a 300m swim near the Old Port, three laps of 2.4 km each for the bike, and two 1 km laps of running, with the finish line at the port.

A mixed relay race was held on the third day of the event. Each athlete swam 300m, and biked two laps of 3.3 km each. The first, second and third athletes for each country ran two laps for a total distance of 1.9 km before handing off to the next athlete, while the final athlete ran 1.67 km to the finish line.

==== Men ====
Due to the short race distance, athletes remained clustered together for majority of the races, with 10 seconds separating the top 10 in each of the qualifying heats and 5 seconds separating the top 10 in the repechage. An even bigger pack of athletes finished together in the first heat of day two, with the top 20 athletes finishing within 5 seconds of each other. The second heat featured the top 10 athletes finishing in a 6-second span, solidifying the start list for the final heat.

Jacob Birtwhistle, Marten Van Riel, Léo Bergère, Kevin Mcdowell, Dorian Coninx, Vincent Luis, Hayden Wilde, Taylor Reid, Antonio Serrat Seoane and Seth Rider were featured on the start list for the final eliminator heat. The athletes remained within 15 seconds of each other after the swim and formed a single pack on the bike. Five athletes formed a lead group on the run, though Coninx would eventually come out in front, followed by Luis and Bergere, closing out a French podium sweep.

==== Women ====
The women's qualifiers had a greater spread in comparison to the men's races, with 38 seconds separating the top 10 in the first heat, 15 seconds in the second heat, and 13 seconds in the repechage. 10 seconds separated the top 20 in the first final, while the top 10 in the second final finished within 23 seconds of each other.

Taylor Knibb, Laura Lindemann, Flora Duffy, Non Stanford, Katie Zaferes, Taylor Spivey, Léonie Périault, Sophie Coldwell, Nicole Van Der Kaay and Verena Steinhauser all qualified for the final heat of the event. Although the athletes finished the swim within 5 seconds of each other, a lead group consisting of Duffy, Knibb and Spivey broke away from the rest of the field on the bike and stayed close together for the entirety of the run. Duffy finished first, while Knibb and Spivey claimed the second and third spots on the podium, respectively. Katie Zaferes completed an American sweep of second through fourth place by finishing behind Spivey.

==== Mixed relay ====
Kira Gupta-Baltazar (CAN) and Miyu Sakai (JPN) exited the water as the early leaders of the race, with Taylor Spivey (USA) 10 seconds behind. During the first lap of the bike, Sakai experienced an issue with her chain and was unable to maintain the lead. The majority of the run was dominated by Spivey and Nicole Van Der Kaay (NZL), with Beatrice Mallozzi (ITA) right behind. After the first exchange it was Seth Rider (USA), Dylan McCullough (NZL) and Gianluca Pozzatti (ITA) at the front of the race, their lead increasing over the course of the swim and bike. Rider pulled away from the others to lead the United States before handing over to Kristen Kasper (USA). Alice Betto (ITA) and Ainsley Thorpe (NZL) remained 15 seconds off the lead as Kasper reached the midway point of the swim, but eventually caught up during the bike. Betto pulled away during the run and handed over to Alessandro Fabian (ITA), who started the last swim segment with Saxon Morgan (NZL) right behind and Chase McQueen (USA) 9 seconds further back. At the end of the swim, the leaders were close together and remained close for the bike portion. McQueen pulled away one last time on the run to secure a win for the United States, while Morgan claiming the silver for New Zealand and Fabian earning the final podium spot for Italy.

=== Edmonton ===
The Grand Final for the 2021 World Triathlon Championship Series was held at Hawrelak Park over a standard-distance course. The 1500m swim consisted of two 750m laps in the lake, followed by eight laps of 5 km each for 40 km of cycling total. The 10 km run was composed of four laps of a 2.5 km course.

==== Men ====
Only 39 points separated Kristian Blummenfelt and Alex Yee, the current leaders of the series before Edmonton, meaning that the faster of the two would be the series champion unless Marten Van Riel, who was third in the overall standings, outperformed them by enough of a margin. Van Riel, along with Vincent Luis and Hungarian athlete Mark Devay, built a lead over the rest of the competitors after the first lap of the swim. After the second lap, the nearest chasers were Taylor Reid and Dorian Coninx 15 seconds behind, Blummenfelt 35 seconds back and Yee 50 seconds. A chasing pack of 17 athletes including Blummenfelt continued to pursue the leaders, closing the gap to 24 seconds with one lap to go. Yee started the run 90 seconds behind Blummenfelt, who made his way to the front over the course of the run. In the final 500m, it came down to Blummenfelt, Van Riel and Léo Bergère; with Blummenfelt winning the final sprint to become the first man to win the World Triathlon Championship Series and Olympics in the same year. Bérgère narrowly won the silver, while Van Riel earned bronze. All three athletes finished within a second of each other.

==== Women ====
Flora Duffy entered the grand final with enough of a gap over nearest competitors in the series standings, with Taylor Spivey in second place and Maya Kingma only 9 points behind in third. Duffy was the early race leader in the swim, although she was overtaken by Taylor Knibb on the second lap. Knibb was joined by Kingma coming into the first transition, while Spivey caught up to them at the start of the bike. However, Knibb broke away from the rest of the field and build a 34-second lead over the chasers at the end of the first lap, and continued to steadily increase the gap over the course of the race. By the time she started the run, Knibb earned a 2:43 lead over the nearest chasers, and held her position all the way to the finish. Léonie Périault, who was in the chase pack for majority of the race, pulled away from the group to claim silver. Duffy only needed to finish in the top eight in order to win the series, and secured her title by earning the bronze. She became the first athlete to win the World Triathlon Championship Series and Olympics within the same year, similar to Blummenfelt, who claimed his series title not too long after.

== Results ==
=== Medal summary ===
==== Men ====
Event	Gold	Silver	Bronze
Yokohama	Kristian Blummenfelt (NOR)	Jelle Geens (BEL)	Morgan Pearson (USA)
Leeds	Alex Yee (GBR)	Morgan Pearson (USA)	Marten Van Riel (BEL)
Tokyo	Kristian Blummenfelt (NOR)	Alex Yee (GBR)	Hayden Wilde (NZL)
Montreal	Dorian Coninx (FRA)	Vincent Luis (FRA)	Léo Bergère (FRA)
Edmonton	Kristian Blummenfelt (NOR)	Marten Van Riel (BEL)	Léo Bergère (FRA)
Overall	Kristian Blummenfelt (NOR)	Marten Van Riel (BEL)	Alex Yee (GBR)

==== Women ====
Event	Gold	Silver	Bronze
Yokohama	Taylor Knibb (USA)	Summer Rappaport (USA)	Maya Kingma (NED)
Leeds	Maya Kingma (NED)	Jessica Learmonth (GBR)	Sophie Coldwell (GBR)
Tokyo	Flora Duffy (BER)	Georgia Taylor-Brown (GBR)	Katie Zaferes (USA)
Montreal	Flora Duffy (BER)	Taylor Knibb (USA)	Taylor Spivey (USA)
Edmonton	Taylor Knibb (USA)	Léonie Périault (FRA)	Flora Duffy (BER)
Overall	Flora Duffy (BER)	Taylor Knibb (USA)	Taylor Spivey (USA)

==== Mixed relay ====
Event	Gold	Silver	Bronze
Tokyo	United Kingdom; Jessica Learmonth; Jonathan Brownlee; Georgia Taylor-Brown; Alex Yee	United States; Katie Zaferes; Kevin McDowell; Taylor Knibb; Morgan Pearson	France; Léonie Périault; Dorian Coninx; Cassandre Beaugrand; Vincent Luis
Montreal	United States; Seth Rider; Taylor Spivey; Kristen Kasper; Chase McQueen	New Zealand; Nicole Van Der Kaay; Dylan McCullough; Ainsley Thorpe; Saxon Morgan	Italy; Beatrice Mallozzi; Gianluca Pozzatti; Alice Betto; Alessandro Fabian

== Overall standings ==
In the individual events, the athlete who accumulates the most points throughout the season is declared the year's world champion. The final point standings for the 2021 season were:

=== Men ===
Rank	Athlete	Points
Gold medal	Kristian Blummenfelt (NOR)	3927
Silver medal	Marten Van Riel (BEL)	3594
Bronze medal	Alex Yee (GBR)	3289
4	Léo Bergère (FRA)	3131
5	Hayden Wilde (NZL)	2719
6	Vincent Luis (FRA)	2614
7	Dorian Coninx (FRA)	2525
8	Antonio Serrat Seoane (ESP)	2371
9	Seth Rider (USA)	1812
10	Morgan Pearson (USA)	1781

=== Women ===
Rank	Athlete	Points
Gold medal	Flora Duffy (BER)	3861
Silver medal	Taylor Knibb (USA)	3486
Bronze medal	Taylor Spivey (USA)	3239
4	Maya Kingma (NED)	3161
5	Sophie Coldwell (GBR)	2942
6	Katie Zaferes (USA)	2902
7	Léonie Périault (FRA)	2620
8	Laura Lindemann (GER)	2516
9	Non Stanford (GBR)	1982
10	Alice Betto (ITA)	1697
