= 2020 ITU World Triathlon Series =

- League: ITU World Triathlon Series
- Sport: Triathlon

Men's Championship
- World Champion: Vincent Luis (FRA)
- Time: 49:13

Women's Championship
- World Champion: Georgia Taylor-Brown (GBR)
- Time: 54:16

World Triathlon Series seasons
- 2019 2021

The 2020 ITU World Triathlon Series was the 12th season of the World Triathlon Series, the top level international series for triathlon since its establishment in 2009. The season was originally scheduled to consist of seven pairs of triathlon races for both a men's and women's competition, as well as three mixed relays, beginning on March 7 in Abu Dhabi and concluding August 22 with the Grand Final in Edmonton. Other notable events on the calendar included the Mixed Relay Olympic Qualifier in Chengdu on May 10 and the 2020 Summer Olympics, with the men's and women's individual events taking place on July 27 and 28th and the mixed relay event taking place on August 1.

Due to the COVID-19 pandemic, there were several changes to the calendar, including the cancellation of multiple events and postponement of the 2020 Olympics. As a result, ITU made the decision to award World Championship titles at the last remaining event of the 2020 series, set to be held in Hamburg on September 5, 2020. Vincent Luis and Katie Zaferes entered the race as the defending champions from the 2019 Season. Luis would go on to defend his title, with Georgia Taylor-Brown winning the World Championship for the first time in her career.

== Overview ==
=== Calendar ===
The 2020 ITU World Triathlon Series was planned to visit eight cities, including Tokyo for the 2020 Olympics.

Events
Date	Location	Status
March 7–8	(United Arab Emirates) Abu Dhabi	Cancelled
April 18–19	Bermuda	Cancelled
May 16–17	(Japan) Yokohama	Cancelled
June 6–7	(United Kingdom) Leeds	Cancelled
June 27–28	(Canada) Montreal	Cancelled
July 11–12	(Germany) Hamburg	Postponed to September 5–6
July 27–28	(Japan) Tokyo	Olympics, Postponed to July 26–27, 2021
August 22–23	(Canada) Edmonton	Grand Final, Cancelled

Mixed Relays
Date	Location	Status
March 8	(United Arab Emirates) Abu Dhabi	Cancelled
May 10	(China) Chengdu	Olympic Qualification Event, Cancelled
July 12	(Germany) Hamburg	World Championships, Postponed to September 6
August 1	(Japan) Tokyo	Olympics, Postponed to July 31, 2021
August 23	(Canada) Edmonton	Cancelled

=== COVID-19 Pandemic ===
Due to the growing uncertainty of COVID-19, ITU announced on February 26 that the Mixed Relay Olympic Qualification Event, which was originally set to be held in Chengdu, would be moved to Valencia. 3 days later, ITU postponed the World Triathlon events in Abu Dhabi indefinitely, with hopes of finding a new date in late March or April.

On March 14, 2020, ITU made the decision to suspend all activities until April 30, thus suspending all competitions, courses, camps and other events. All World and Olympic Qualification Rankings were frozen effective March 16. In the official announcement, ITU president Marisol Casado stated:

This is a decision that is hard to take, and you can have my word that we are taking it with the health and safety of athletes, coaches, officials, facilitators, staff, volunteers and spectators, all the triathlon family, as the top priority. We are taking this decision convinced that we all have to take our part to prevent and stop the spread of the virus. It is our responsibility, as a society. And having our athletes, coaches, officials and staff travelling around the world at this challenging time is not something that we in World Triathlon are willing to risk.

Following the postponement of several races, including multiple World Triathlon events and the Olympic Games, ITU made the decision on April 3 to extend its suspension of activities until June 30. As the pandemic progressed, an increasing number events went from postponements to cancellations, thus shortening the 2020 World Triathlon Season. On August 25, ITU announced that the 2020 World Triathlon Champions would be determined at the Hamburg World Triathlon Event, which was set to take place on September 5 after being postponed from July 11. In addition to hosting the sole World Triathlon Series event, Hamburg was set to host the World Triathlon Mixed Relay Championship on September 6.

== Results ==
=== Individual World Championship ===
==== Men ====
Rank	Athlete	Time
Gold medal	Vincent Luis (FRA)	49:13
Silver medal	Vasco Vilaça (POR)	49:15
Bronze medal	Léo Bergère (FRA)	49:18
4	Jelle Geens (BEL)	49:22
5	Alex Yee (GBR)	49:24
6	Dorian Coninx (FRA)	49:27
7	Richard Murray (RSA)	49:28
8	Morgan Pearson (USA)	49:32
9	Alistair Brownlee (GBR)	49:34
10	Max Studer (SUI)	49:42

==== Women ====
Rank	Athlete	Time
Gold medal	Georgia Taylor-Brown (GBR)	54:16
Silver medal	Flora Duffy (BER)	54:25
Bronze medal	Laura Lindemann (GER)	54:39
4	Taylor Spivey (USA)	54:47
5	Katie Zaferes (USA)	54:50
6	Maya Kingma (NED)	54:53
7	Jessica Learmonth (GBR)	55:18
8	Rachel Klamer (NED)	55:26
9	Lotte Miller (NOR)	55:29
10	Therese Feuersinger (AUT)	55:32

=== Mixed Relay World Championship ===
Rank	Country	Athletes	Time
Gold medal	France	Léonie Périault; Léo Bergère; Cassandre Beaugrand; Dorian Coninx	1:18:25
Silver medal	United States	Taylor Spivey; Kevin McDowell; Katie Zaferes; Morgan Pearson	1:18:33
Bronze medal	(United Kingdom) Great Britain	Georgia Taylor-Brown; Barclay Izzard; Jessica Learmonth; Alex Yee	1:18:59
4	Norway	Lotte Miller; Kristian Blummenfelt; Stine Dale; Gustav Iden	1:19:38
5	Belgium	Valérie Barthelemy; Jelle Geens; Claire Michel; Erwin Vanderplancke	1:19:44
6	Denmark	Alberte Kjaer Pedersen; Emil Holm; Sif Bendix Madsen; Andreas Schilling	1:19:47
7	Switzerland	Alissa Kong; Adrien Briffod; Jolanda Annen; Max Studer	1:20:01
8	Germany	Lisa Tertsch; Jonas Schomburg; Laura Lindemann; Lasse Luehrs	1:20:08
9	Austria	Therese Feuersinger; Alois Knabl; Julia Hauser; Lukas Hollaus	1:20:17
10	Italy	Beatrice Mallozzi; Delian Stateff; Verena Steinhauser; Alessandro Fabian	1:20:20
