= 2019 ITU World Triathlon Series =

- League: ITU World Triathlon Series
- Sport: Triathlon

Men's Series
- Series Champion: Vincent Luis (FRA)
- Points: 5096

Women's Series
- Series Champion: Katie Zaferes (USA)
- Points: 6175

World Triathlon Series seasons
- 2018 2020

The 2019 ITU World Triathlon Series was the 11th season of the World Triathlon Series, the top level international series for triathlon, since its establishment in 2009. The season consisted of eight pairs of triathlon races for both a men's and woman's competition, beginning on 8 March in Abu Dhabi, and concluding on 1 September with the grand final at Lausanne, Switzerland. The season also contained five mixed relays as part of the Mixed Relay Series which offers national teams qualifying points for the mixed team relay event at the 2020 Tokyo Olympics.

Mario Mola and Vicky Holland began the season as defending champions from the 2018 season. Mario Mola was hoping to defend his title and become the first triathlete to hold the title for four years in a row.

== Overview ==
=== Calendar ===
The 2019 ITU World Triathlon Series visited ten cities, including a test run of the 2020 Summer Olympics relay course as part of the Mixed Relay Series.

Events
| Date | Location | Type |
|---|---|---|
| 8–9 March | (United Arab Emirates) Abu Dhabi | Sprint |
| 27–28 April | Hamilton, Bermuda | Standard |
| 18–19 May | (Japan) Yokohama | Standard |
| 8–9 June | (United Kingdom) Leeds | Standard |
| 29 June | (Canada) Montreal | Sprint |
| 6-7 July | (Germany) Hamburg | Sprint |
| 20-21 July | (Canada) Edmonton | Sprint |
| 30 August – 1 September | (Switzerland) Lausanne | Grand Final |

Mixed Relays
| Date | Location | Type |
|---|---|---|
| 9 March | (United Arab Emirates) Abu Dhabi | Mixed relay |
| 15 June | (United Kingdom) Nottingham | Mixed relay |
| 7 July | (Germany) Hamburg | Mixed relay (World Championships) |
| 21 July | (Canada) Edmonton | Mixed relay |
| 18 August | (Japan) Tokyo | Mixed relay (Olympics Test Event) |

=== Point System ===
For every race a triathlete finishes they are awarded points based on their position across the line. For a normal world series event first place is awarded 1000 points and every subsequent place is awarded 7.5% less, for the first forty triathletes, for the grand final 1250 points are awarded once again decreasing by 7.5% for each place but this time awarded down to 50th. However any triathlete outside of the time cut will not be awarded points even if they finish in a scoring position, the time cut is determined by adding 5% to the winner's time in the men's event and 8% in the women's event. A triathletes final score is the sum of their points from the grand final and their best five races of that year.

== Series ==
=== Abu Dhabi ===
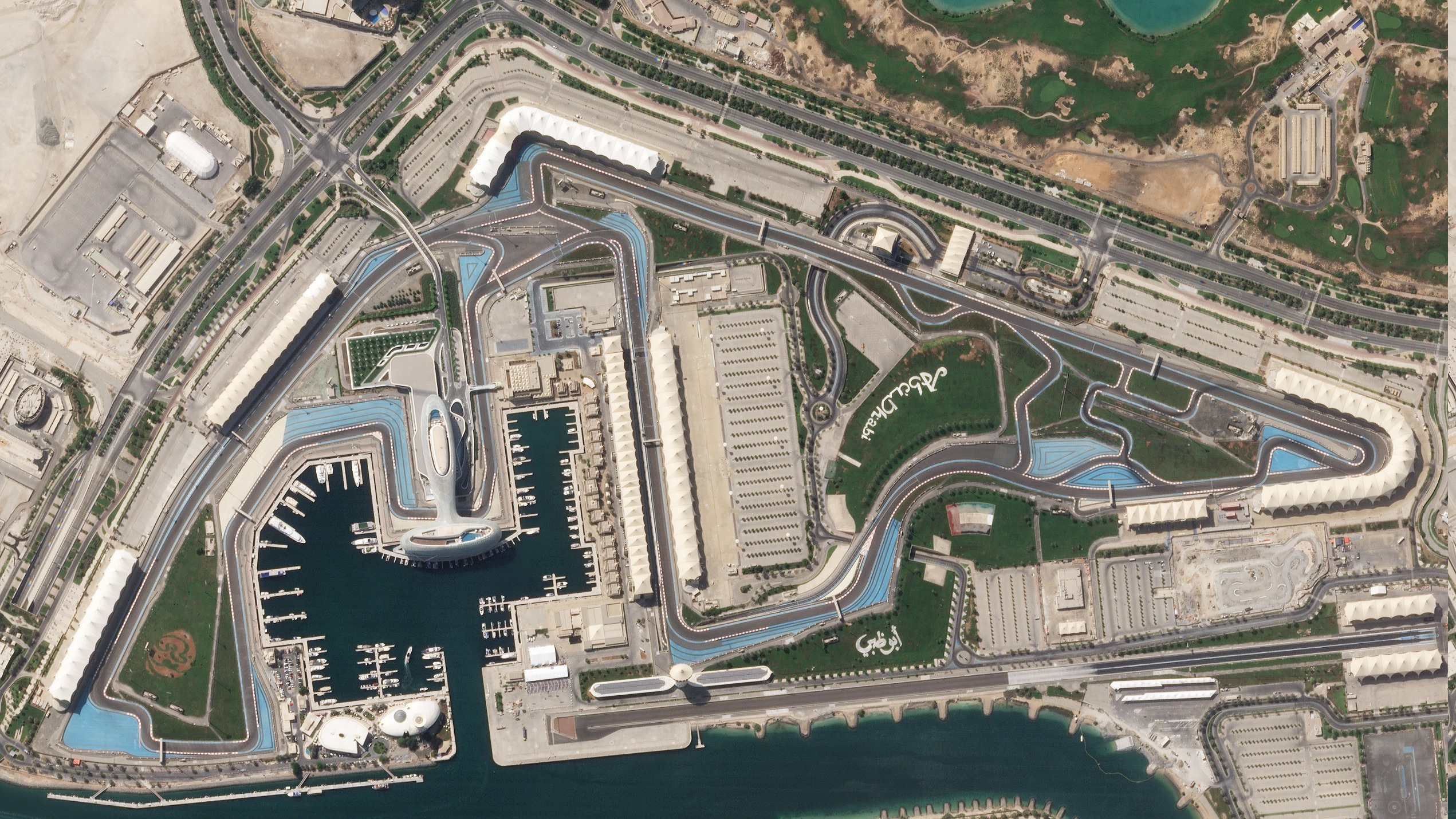
Yas Marina harbour held the swim before cycling on the F1 track

The 2019 series began with a sprint distance race in Abu Dhabi in and around the marina on Yas Island. It was the 10th time the race had been held there and the 5th time a sprint distance race was held. The swim course was held in the harbour one 750-metre laps, before heading to transition outside of the Yas Marina Circuit. Athletes then biked five laps of a 4 km course that ran along the Formula 1 circuit. After the bike section, the competitors proceeded to complete two laps of a 2.5 km run circuit over part of the F1 track and part of the marina before finishing the triathlon at the Marina.

The competition field for the race included both defending champions Mario Mola and Vicky Holland, as well as most of the top ten athletes from last year's the overall rankings. Also competing was debutante Alex Yee who had won the most recent World cup race in Cape town.

In the woman race a small split appeared in the swim which was pushed on the bike such that by the halfway point of bike course, a breakaway of seven was fully established. The group included Americans Zaferes, Spivey and Knibb, along with Learmonth of the UK. The breakaway pushed their advantage such that they had a lead a minute on the chasers by the time they hit the second transition. Zaferes was first out onto the run and lead for the rest of the race pulling away from everyone else to win alone. Spivey floated in between first and the battle for third. Meanwhile, Knibb and Learmonth were neck-and-neck for third and finished in a sprint finish which Learmonth won.

On the men's side, whilst a split appeared in the swim and at the start of the bike leg, over the full course of the bike leg the entire field slowly regrouped such that the entire field entered transitioned at the same time. New Zealand's Hayden Wilde initially tried to create a gap on the run, but was soon chased down by the leading pair of Yee and Mola. The pair stayed together and in the lead until with 500m to go Mola upped the pace to claim first with Yee following up in second. Third across the line was Spaniard Fernando Alarza.

== Results ==
=== Medal summary ===
==== Men ====
| Event | Gold | Silver | Bronze |
|---|---|---|---|
| Abu Dhabi | Mario Mola (ESP) | Alex Yee (GBR) | Fernando Alarza (ESP) |
| Bermuda | Dorian Coninx (FRA) | Javier Gómez (ESP) | Gustav Iden (NOR) |
| Yokohama | Vincent Luis (FRA) | Henri Schoeman (RSA) | Bence Bicsák (HUN) |
| Leeds | Jacob Birtwhistle (AUS) | Matthew McElroy (USA) | Javier Gómez (ESP) |
| Montreal | Jelle Geens (BEL) | Mario Mola (ESP) | Tyler Mislawchuk (CAN) |
| Hamburg | Jacob Birtwhistle (AUS) | Vincent Luis (FRA) | Jelle Geens (BEL) |
| Edmonton | Jonathan Brownlee (GBR) | Mario Mola (ESP) | Marten Van Riel (BEL) |
| Lausanne | Kristian Blummenfelt (NOR) | Mario Mola (ESP) | Fernando Alarza (ESP) |
| Overall | Vincent Luis (FRA) | Mario Mola (ESP) | Javier Gomez (ESP) |

==== Women ====
| Event | Gold | Silver | Bronze |
|---|---|---|---|
| Abu Dhabi | Katie Zaferes (USA) | Taylor Spivey (USA) | Jessica Learmonth (GBR) |
| Bermuda | Katie Zaferes (USA) | Jessica Learmonth (GBR) | Joanna Brown (CAN) |
| Yokohama | Katie Zaferes (USA) | Summer Rappaport (USA) | Taylor Spivey (USA) |
| Leeds | Georgia Taylor-Brown (GBR) | Katie Zaferes (USA) | Jessica Learmonth (GBR) |
| Montreal | Katie Zaferes (USA) | Georgia Taylor-Brown (GBR) | Jessica Learmonth (GBR) |
| Hamburg | Non Stanford (GBR) | Cassandre Beaugrand (FRA) | Summer Rappaport (USA) |
| Edmonton | Emma Jackson (AUS) | Summer Rappaport (USA) | Ashleigh Gentle (AUS) |
| Lausanne | Katie Zaferes (USA) | Jessica Learmonth (GBR) | Georgia Taylor-Brown (GBR) |
| Overall | Katie Zaferes (USA) | Jessica Learmonth (GBR) | Georgia Taylor-Brown (GBR) |

==== Mixed relay ====
| Event | Gold | Silver | Bronze |
|---|---|---|---|
| Abu Dhabi | Australia; Ashleigh Gentle; Luke Willian; Emma Jeffcoat; Jacob Birtwhistle | United States; Taylor Spivey; Ben Kanute; Katie Zaferes; Eli Hemming | New Zealand; Ainsley Thorpe; Sam Ward; Sophie Corbidge; Hayden Wilde |
| Nottingham | Great Britain; Georgia Taylor-Brown; Ben Dijkstra; Sophie Coldwell; Alex Yee | Switzerland; Jolanda Annen; Max Studer; Alissa König; Adrien Briffod | France; Émilie Morier; Dorian Coninx; Léonie Périault; Pierre Le Corre |
| Hamburg | France; Émilie Morier; Léo Bergère; Cassandre Beaugrand; Vincent Luis | Germany; Laura Lindemann; Valentin Wernz; Nina Eim; Justus Nieschlag | Australia; Natalie Van Coevorden; Aaron Royle; Emma Jeffcoat; Jacob Birtwhistle |
| Edmonton | New Zealand; Ainsley Thorpe; Tayler Reid; Nicole van der Kaay; Hayden Wilde | Great Britain; Sophie Coldwell; Jonathan Brownlee; India Lee; Gordon Benson | United States; Summer Rappaport; Seth Rider; Taylor Knibb; Morgan Pearson |
| Tokyo | France; Léonie Périault; Pierre Le Corre; Cassandre Beaugrand; Dorian Coninx | Great Britain; Jessica Learmonth; Gordon Benson; Georgia Taylor-Brown; Alex Yee | United States; Summer Rappaport; Seth Rider; Tamara Gorman; Ben Kanute |

== Overall standings ==
In the individual events, the athlete who accumulates the most points throughout the season is declared the year's world champion. The final point standings are:

Men
| Rank | Athlete | Points |
|---|---|---|
| Gold medal | Vincent Luis (FRA) | 5096 |
| Silver medal | Mario Mola (ESP) | 4939 |
| Bronze medal | Javier Gómez (ESP) | 4533 |
| 4 | Fernando Alarza (ESP) | 4395 |
| 5 | Marten Van Riel (BEL) | 3659 |
| 6 | Jacob Birtwhistle (AUS) | 3433 |
| 7 | Henri Schoeman (RSA) | 3148 |
| 8 | Léo Bergere (FRA) | 3042 |
| 9 | Gustav Iden (NOR) | 3028 |
| 10 | Kristian Blummenfelt (NOR) | 2892 |

Women
| Rank | Athlete | Points |
|---|---|---|
| Gold medal | Katie Zaferes (USA) | 6175 |
| Silver medal | Jessica Learmonth (GBR) | 5326 |
| Bronze medal | Georgia Taylor-Brown (GBR) | 5191 |
| 4 | Taylor Spivey (USA) | 4651 |
| 5 | Summer Rappaport (USA) | 3589 |
| 6 | Rachel Klamer (NED) | 3586 |
| 7 | Non Stanford (GBR) | 3435 |
| 8 | Cassandre Beaugrand (FRA) | 2548 |
| 9 | Annamaria Mazzetti (ITA) | 2456 |
| 10 | Laura Lindemann (GER) | 2427 |
