= 2022 World Triathlon Sprint Championships =

The 2022 World Triathlon Sprint & Relay Championships was a series of triathlon races organised by World Triathlon held in Montréal, Canada on June 23–26, 2022.

The event was the first combined sprint and mixed relay world championships, and also included age-grade championships in both disciplines. It marked the return of a stand alone sprint championships for the first time since 2011.

The Sprint Championships involved a new super-sprint Eliminator format, involving multiple races over a relatively short parcours (300 metre swim, 5 km bike ride, 2 km run). In both men's and women's events, two semi-finals were held with the first ten finishers in each qualifying directly for the final. For those who did not qualify, repecharge races (two for men, one for women) allowed a further ten athletes to qualify for the final thirty.

The final involved three super-sprint races in quick succession with only twenty minute breaks between races. At the end of the first leg, the last ten triathletes were eliminated; at the end of the second, a further ten dropped out, with the last leg involving the final ten athletes racing for the Championship. Athletes were ranked by finishing position in their final race (21st to 30th from positions after the first leg, 11th to 20th from second leg and 1st to 10th from the final).

== Results ==
=== Men ===
The results of the final leg were:

Place	Name	Time
Gold medal	Alex Yee (GBR)	21:55
Silver medal	Hayden Wilde (NZL)	21:58
Bronze medal	Léo Bergere (FRA)	21:59
4	Jelle Geens (BEL)	22:02
5	Manoel Messias (BRA)	22:05
6	Vincent Luis (FRA)	22:08
7	Pierre Le Corre (FRA)	22:11
8	Jawad Abdelmoula (MAR)	22:13
9	Marten van Reil (BEL)	22:41
10	João Silva (POR)	24:07

=== Women ===
Place	Name	Time
Gold medal	Georgia Taylor-Brown (GBR)	24:04
Silver medal	Cassandre Beaugrand (FRA)	24:07
Bronze medal	Beth Potter (GBR)	24:15
4	Alberte Kjær Pedersen (DEN)	24:25
5	Summer Rappaport (USA)	24:42
6	Taylor Spivey (USA)	24:44
7	Sophie Coldwell (GBR)	24:47
8	Jeanne Lehair^{a}	24:51
9	Djenyfer Arnold (BRA)	25:25
10	Verena Steinhauser (ITA)	25:25

== Notes ==
a. Lehair raced as a neutral athlete as she was in the process of transferring allegiance from France to Luxembourg..
