= Triathlon at the 2020 Summer Olympics – Mixed relay =

Mixed relay at the Games of the XXXII Olympiad
- Venue: Odaiba Marine Park, Tokyo
- Date: 31 July 2021
- Competitors: 64 from 16 nations
- Winning time: 1:23:41

Medalists
1st place, gold medalist(s)		Jess Learmonth; Jonny Brownlee; Georgia Taylor-Brown; Alex Yee	Great Britain
2nd place, silver medalist(s)		Katie Zaferes; Kevin McDowell; Taylor Knibb; Morgan Pearson	United States
3rd place, bronze medalist(s)		Léonie Périault; Dorian Coninx; Cassandre Beaugrand; Vincent Luis	France

The mixed relay triathlon at the 2020 Summer Olympics took place at the Odaiba Marine Park in Tokyo on 31 July 2021.

The mixed team event featured teams of four (two men and two women). Each athlete performed a triathlon of 300 m (330 yd) swim, 6.8 km (4.2 mi) cycle, and a 2 km (1.2 mi) run in a relay format.

Kristian Blummenfelt and Flora Duffy, gold medallists in men's and women's individual events, were unable to participate since Norway and Bermuda failed to qualify four athletes, while Austria and South Africa were forced to scratch as they were unable to field a team due to athletes being injured during individual events. Great Britain, France, Germany and the United States were considered strong medal contenders.

Alex Yee, silver medallist of the men's individual event, brought Great Britain home for the gold. Morgan Pearson and Vincent Luis anchored the silver and bronze for the United States and France. Mexico's Irving Pérez finishes the race as the last athlete while Russia's Igor Polyanski tested positive for doping and receives 3-year suspension in October 2021, jeopardizing the country's rank in the event.

== Results ==
Rank	Nation	Triathletes	Swimming	Cycling	Running	Total time	Difference
1st place, gold medalist(s)	Great Britain	Jess Learmonth; Jonny Brownlee; Georgia Taylor-Brown; Alex Yee	16:13	39:57	23:14	1:23:41	__
2nd place, silver medalist(s)	United States	Katie Zaferes; Kevin McDowell; Taylor Knibb; Morgan Pearson	16:28	39:26	23:31	1:23:55	+0:14
3rd place, bronze medalist(s)	France	Léonie Périault; Dorian Coninx; Cassandre Beaugrand; Vincent Luis	16:35	39:51	23:21	1:24:04	+0:23
4	Netherlands	Rachel Klamer; Marco van der Stel; Maya Kingma; Jorik van Egdom	16:27	39:44	23:50	1:24:34	+0:53
5	Belgium	Claire Michel; Marten Van Riel; Valérie Barthelemy; Jelle Geens	16:25	39:57	23:51	1:24:36	+0:55
6	Germany	Laura Lindemann; Jonas Schomburg; Anabel Knoll; Justus Nieschlag	16:26	39:53	23:59	1:24:40	+0:59
7	Switzerland	Jolanda Annen; Andrea Salvisberg; Nicola Spirig; Max Studer	16:36	40:17	24:03	1:25:27	+1:46
8	Italy	Verena Steinhauser; Gianluca Pozzatti; Alice Betto; Delian Stateff	16:33	40:46	24:38	1:26:23	+2:42
9	Australia	Ashleigh Gentle; Matthew Hauser; Emma Jeffcoat; Jacob Birtwhistle	16:27	41:16	24:19	1:26:27	+2:46
10	Spain	Anna Godoy; Fernando Alarza; Miriam Casillas; Mario Mola	16:29	41:10	24:24	1:26:31	+2:50
11	Hungary	Zsanett Bragmayer; Bence Bicsák; Zsófia Kovács; Tamás Tóth	16:43	41:11	24:14	1:26:43	+3:02
12	New Zealand	Ainsley Thorpe; Tayler Reid; Nicole van der Kaay; Hayden Wilde	16:47	40:39	24:56	1:26:53	+3:12
13	Japan	Yuko Takahashi; Kenji Nener; Niina Kishimoto; Makoto Odakura	16:38	40:48	25:10	1:27:02	+3:21
14	Canada	Amélie Kretz; Matthew Sharpe; Joanna Brown; Alexis Lepage	16:40	40:36	25:23	1:27:21	+3:40
15	Mexico	Cecilia Pérez; Crisanto Grajales; Claudia Rivas; Irving Pérez	16:38	41:32	25:59	1:28:53	+5:12
DNS	Austria	Julia Hauser; Alois Knabl; Lisa Perterer; Lukas Hollaus					DNS
DSQ	ROC	Alexandra Razarenova; Dmitry Polyanski; Anastasia Gorbunova; Igor Polyanski	~~16:23~~	~~41:11~~	~~25:02~~	~~1:27:13~~	~~+3:32~~
