= Stefan Zachäus =

Luxembourgish triathlete

Personal information
- Nationality: Luxembourgish
- Born: 18 October 1990 (age 34); Wurzen, Germany

Sport
- Sport: Triathlon

Stefan Zachäus (born 18 October 1990) is a Luxembourgish triathlete. He qualified to represent Luxembourg at the 2020 Summer Olympics in Tokyo, competing in triathlon.
