= Jorik van Egdom =

Dutch triathlete (born 1995)

Personal information
- Nationality: Dutch
- Born: 16 May 1995 (age 30) Veenendaal, Netherlands

Sport
- Sport: Triathlon

Jorik van Egdom (born 16 May 1995) is a Dutch triathlete. He competed in the mixed relay event at the 2020 Summer Olympics.
