= Niina Kishimoto =

Japanese triathlete

Personal information
- Nationality: Japanese
- Born: 30 November 1995 (age 30) Kawagoe, Japan

Sport
- Sport: Triathlon

Niina Kishimoto (岸本 新菜, born 30 November 1995) is a Japanese triathlete. She competed in the women's event at the 2020 Summer Olympics held in Tokyo, Japan. She also competed in the mixed relay event.
