= Georgia Taylor-Brown =

British triathlete

Georgia Taylor-Brown MBE
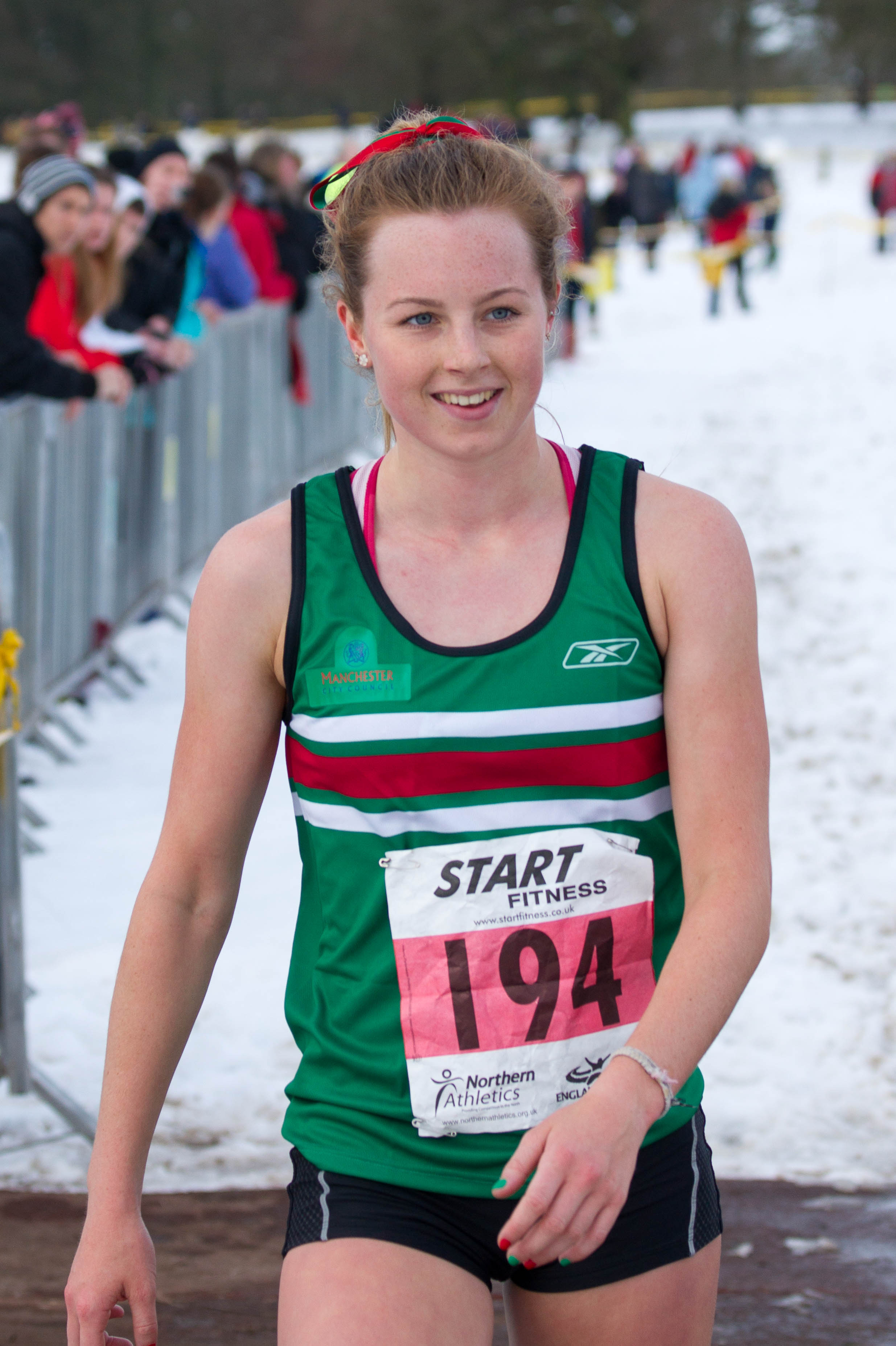
- Taylor-Brown in 2013

Personal information
- Nationality: English
- Born: 15 March 1994 (age 32) Manchester, England, United Kingdom

Sport
- Country: Great Britain
- Sport: Triathlon
Medal record
Women's triathlon
Representing Great Britain
Olympic Games
Gold medal – first place	2020 Tokyo	Mixed relay
Silver medal – second place	2020 Tokyo	Individual
Bronze medal – third place	2024 Paris	Mixed relay
World Triathlon Championships
Gold medal – first place	2020	Elite
Silver medal – second place	2022	Elite
Bronze medal – third place	2018	Elite
Bronze medal – third place	2019	Elite
Bronze medal – third place	2026	Elite
World Sprint Championships
Gold medal – first place	2022 Montréal	Sprint
World Mixed Relay Championships
Silver medal – second place	2022 Montréal	Mixed Relay
World Triathlon Series - Races
Gold medal – first place	2020 Hamburg	Elite
Silver medal – second place	2026 Pontevedra	Elite
Bronze medal – third place	2018 Gold Coast	Elite
Bronze medal – third place	2019 Lausanne	Elite
Super League Triathlon
Gold medal – first place	2021	Championship Series
Gold medal – first place	2022	Championship Series
Bronze medal – third place	2022	Championship Series
Representing England
Commonwealth Games
Gold medal – first place	2022 Birmingham	Mixed relay
Silver medal – second place	2022 Birmingham	Individual

Georgia Taylor-Brown (born 15 March 1994) is an English professional triathlete. Having won bronze in the 2018 and 2019 World Triathlon Series, Taylor-Brown won the one-off sprint triathlon race in Hamburg that constituted the 2020 World Triathlon Championship, becoming the fifth British woman to become world champion.

In 2021, Taylor-Brown won the silver medal in the 2020 Olympic triathlon, the best result achieved to date by a female triathlete for Great Britain, before winning the gold medal for Great Britain with Jess Learmonth, Jonathan Brownlee and Alex Yee in the Triathlon Mixed Relay on Saturday 31 July 2021. Taylor-Brown also won the 2021 and 2022 Super League Triathlon Championship Series, finishing ahead of Triathlon Mixed Relay Teammate Jess Learmonth. She finished 2nd in all four of the Championship Series races. In 2022, Taylor-Brown won gold in the revived World Triathlon Sprint Championships in Montréal, her second individual global title, and anchored her team to silver in the following day's mixed relay, confirming Great Britain's first quota places at the 2024 Summer Olympics.

Taylor-Brown finished 3rd in the inaugural Esport Triathlon World Championship, held as part of the 2022 Arena Games Triathlon season.

She is Great Britain's most successful female Olympic triathlete, and along with Alex Yee, the most successful Olympic triathlete at a single Games. Taylor-Brown is based in Leeds, England where she trains at the Leeds Triathlon Centre. She was born in Manchester, England.

== Career ==
She is a two-time ETU European Junior Champion. Taylor-Brown won the World Junior Championship Silver medal in 2013 along with golds in European Junior Championships in 2012 and 2013. Before that Taylor-Brown won a World Junior Duathlon title in 2012.

A regular in the Great Britain World Triathlon Series squad in 2018, Taylor-Brown earned her first podium at the top level at ITU World Triathlon Leeds behind teammate Vicky Holland and then took bronze at ITU World Triathlon Montreal and ITU World Triathlon Edmonton, helping her to third place in the overall 2018 World Triathlon Series rankings in her debut year, a feat she was able to repeat in 2019 after scoring top ten finishes in every race and a hometown win in Leeds.

Taylor-Brown was also part of the British Mixed Relay teams that won gold at the 2019 Accenture World Triathlon Mixed Relay Series Nottingham and silver in the ITU World Triathlon Mixed Relay Series Tokyo.

In July 2021, Taylor-Brown joined Jessica Learmonth and Vicky Holland to represent Team GB in the Women's Triathlon at the delayed 2020 Summer Olympics in Tokyo. In difficult conditions and despite suffering a flat tyre on the last cycle lap, she nonetheless closed the resulting gap on the lead group ahead to win silver. A few days later Georgia won the gold medal in the Triathlon Mixed Relay at the Tokyo 2020 Olympics on Saturday 31 July 2021 She also won the 2021 Super League Triathlon Championship series, having finished 2nd in all four Championship series races.

At the 2022 Super League Triathlon, Arena Games Triathlon series, Taylor-Brown finished 4th in the London event, and 3rd at the series finale in Singapore. This was enough to finish 3rd in the final standings of the inaugural Esport Triathlon World Championship.

At the 2022 Super League Triathlon Championship Series, Taylor-Brown finished 3rd at the first event in London behind Cassandre Beaugrand and Taylor Spivey. She dominated at the second event in Munich however, finishing 30 seconds ahead of her closest rival. She finished 3rd at SLT Malibu, following a crash on the bike, in the first round of the event. A week later she won again, and again by a significant margin, at SLT Toulouse. At the final event of the series, in NEOM, Saudi Arabia, Taylor Brown won by a narrow margin ahead of fellow British triathletes Sophie Coldwell and Beth Potter. Her performance secured her the overall 2022 Season Championship title.

Taylor-Brown was appointed Member of the Order of the British Empire (MBE) in the 2022 New Year Honours for services to triathlon.

She competed in the women's triathlon at the 2024 Summer Olympics in Paris, France.

== Personal life ==
Taylor-Brown was brought up by an athletic family. Taylor-Brown's father, Darryl Taylor, represented Great Britain in the 800m track run. Her mother Bev swam at national level and ran for Sale Harriers. She has been swimming since she was five. Taylor-Brown started running when she was 12 and was selected to run for her school. She chose to focus on triathlon and had a successful trial with the British Triathlon Olympic Development Squad. Originally from Manchester, she moved to Leeds in 2012 to study for a degree in Sports and Exercise Science at Leeds Beckett University. In July 2025, Taylor-Brown was awarded an honorary doctorate by her former university for her sporting achievements.

Taylor-Brown was formerly in a relationship with British cyclist Josh Edmondson. As of 2023, she is in a relationship with former world champion French triathlete Vincent Luis.

== Competitions ==
The following list of results. Unless indicated otherwise, the competitions are triathlons (Olympic Distance).

Date	Competition	Rank
2021-07-27	2020 Tokyo Olympic Games*	2
2020-09-05	Hamburg Wasser World Triathlon	1
2020-03-14	Mooloolaba ITU Triathlon World Cup	2
2019-08-31	ITU World Triathlon Grand Final Lausanne	3
2019-08-18	ITU World Triathlon Mixed Relay Series Tokyo	2
2019-08-15	Tokyo ITU World Triathlon Olympic Qualification Event	DSQ
2019-07-07	Hamburg ITU Triathlon Mixed Relay World Championships	10
2019-07-06	Hamburg Wasser World Triathlon	5
2019-06-29	Groupe Copley World Triathlon Montreal	2
2019-06-15	Accenture World Triathlon Mixed Relay Series Nottingham	1
2019-06-09	AJ Bell World Triathlon Leeds	1
2019-05-18	ITU World Triathlon Yokohama	5
2019-04-27	MS Amlin World Triathlon Bermuda	5
2019-03-08	Daman World Triathlon Abu Dhabi	9
2018-09-15	ITU World Triathlon Grand Final Gold Coast	8
2018-08-25	ITU World Triathlon Montreal	3
2018-07-28	ITU World Triathlon Mixed Relay Series Edmonton	6
2018-07-27	ITU World Triathlon Edmonton	3
2018-07-14	ITU World Triathlon Hamburg	11
2018-06-10	ITU World Triathlon Leeds	2
2018-04-28	ITU World Triathlon Bermuda	14
2018-03-18	Gran Canaria ETU Sprint Triathlon European Cup	1

DNF = Did not finish

DNS = Did not start

DSQ = Disqualified

* Held in 2021
