= Delian Stateff =

Italian triathlete (born 1994)

Personal information
- Nationality: Italian
- Born: 26 March 1994 (age 30); Rome, Italy

Sport
- Sport: Triathlon

Delian Stateff (born 26 March 1994) is an Italian triathlete. He competed in the men's event at the 2020 Summer Olympics held in Tokyo, Japan. He also competed in the mixed relay event.
