= Lukas Hollaus =

Austrian triathlete (born 1986)

Personal information
- Born: 23 September 1986 (age 38)

Sport
- Country: Austria
- Sport: Triathlon

Lukas Hollaus (born 23 September 1986) is an Austrian triathlete. In 2021, he competed in the men's triathlon at the 2020 Summer Olympics held in Tokyo, Japan, finishing 34th. He was also scheduled to compete in the mixed relay event but the Austrian team did not start.
