= Gianluca Pozzatti =

Italian triathlete (born 1993)

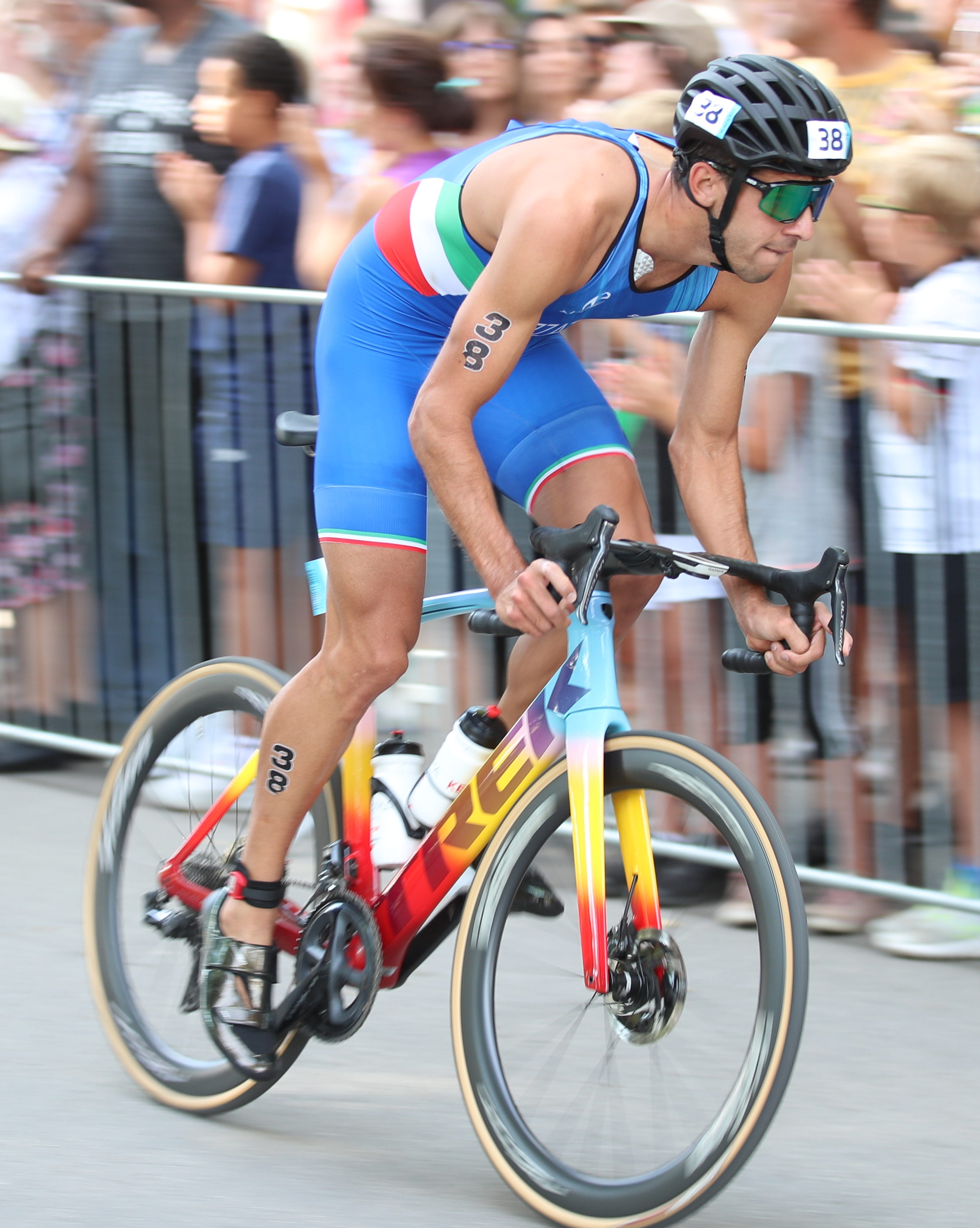

Personal information
- Nationality: Italian
- Born: 22 July 1993 (age 32); Trento, Italy

Sport
- Sport: Triathlon

Gianluca Pozzatti (born 22 July 1993) is an Italian triathlete. During 2020 Summer Olympics held in Tokyo, he competed in the men's event and in the mixed relay event.

During 2024 Summer Olympics held in Paris, he competed in the men's event.
