= Maya Kingma =

Dutch triathlete

Personal information
- Nationality: Dutch
- Born: 8 September 1995 (age 30) Breda, Netherlands

Sport
- Sport: Triathlon

Maya Kingma (born 8 September 1995) is a Dutch triathlete. She represented the Netherlands at the 2020 Summer Olympics in Tokyo 2021, competing in triathlon. She competed in the women's and mixed relay events.

Her achievements include winning the World Triathlon Series race in Leeds on 6 June 2021, and placing third in the race in Yokohama on 15 May 2021, thus ranking number 1 on the World Triathlon Championship Rankings per June 2021.

She competed in the women's triathlon at the 2024 Summer Olympics in Paris, France.
