= Marco van der Stel =

Dutch triathlete

Personal information
- Nationality: Dutch
- Born: 9 December 1991 (age 33); Rotterdam, Netherlands

Sport
- Sport: Triathlon

Marco van der Stel (born 9 December 1991) is a Dutch triathlete. He competed in the mixed relay event at the 2020 Summer Olympics.
