= Amélie Kretz =

Canadian triathlete

Personal information
- Born: 19 May 1993 (age 32); Sainte-Thérèse, Quebec, Canada
- Height: 168 cm (5 ft 6 in)

Sport
- Sport: Triathlon

Amélie Kretz (born 19 May 1993) is a Canadian triathlete. She qualified for the 2016 Summer Olympics with a top-ten finish in the 2016 International Triathlon Union event in Yokohama. In 2016, she was named in the Canadian Olympic team and finished in 2 hours, and 2 minutes and 48 seconds.

During the COVID-19 pandemic, Kretz continued to prepare for the 2020 Summer Olympics, by building a small pool in her parents' garage and tethered herself inside. In July 2021, Kretz was officially named in Canada's 2020 Summer Olympics team.

She competed at the 2022 Commonwealth Games where she came 15th in the women's event.
