= Léo Bergère =

French triathlete (born 1996)

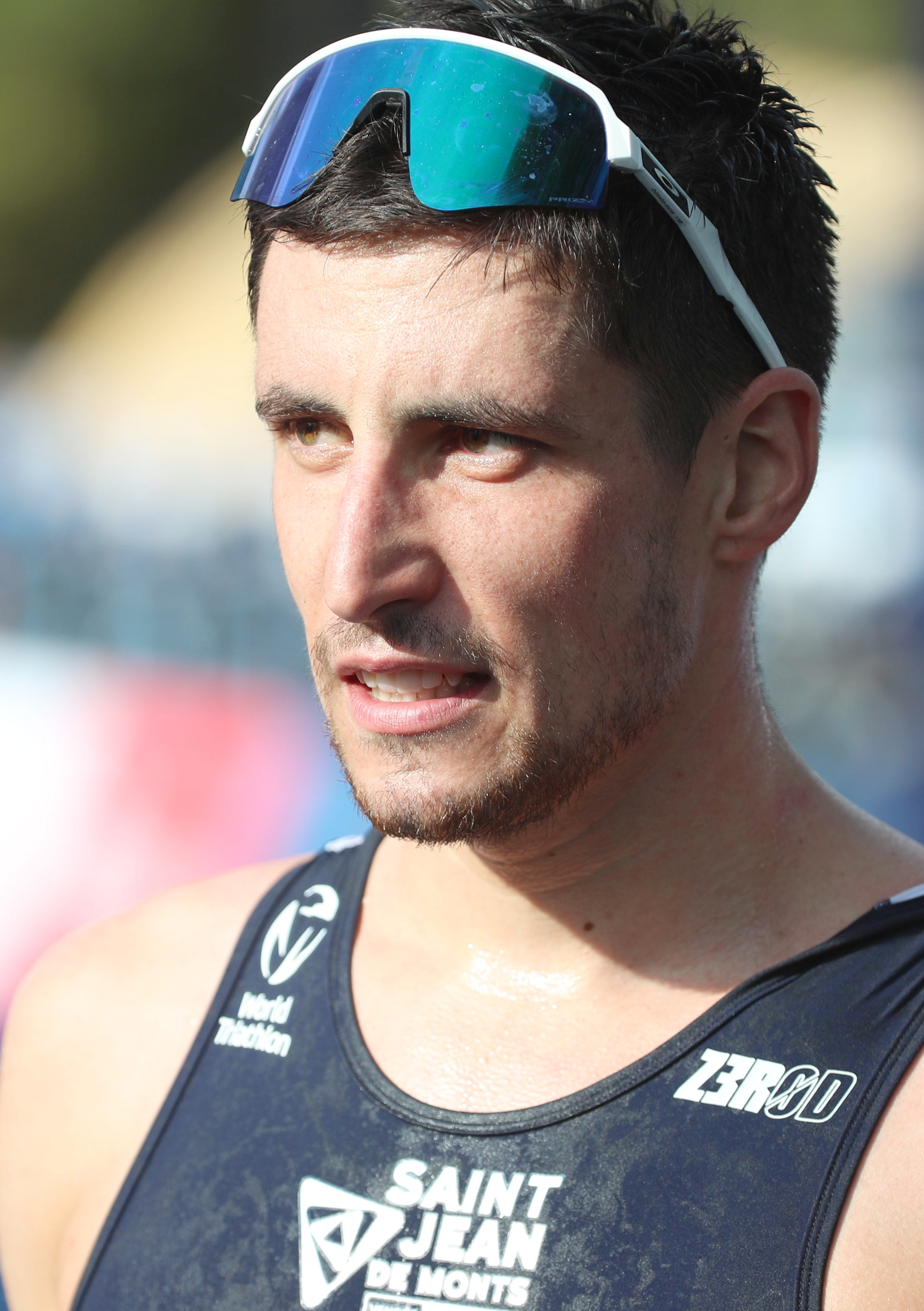
- Bergère in 2022

Personal information
- Born: 28 June 1996 (age 30) Le Pont-de-Beauvoisin, Isère, France

Sport
- Country: France
- Sport: Triathlon
Medal record
Men's triathlon
Representing France
Olympic Games
| Bronze medal – third place | 2024 Paris | Individual |
World Triathlon Series
| Gold medal – first place | 2022 season | Men |
| Silver medal – second place | 2024 season | Men |
| Bronze medal – third place | 2020 Hamburg (F) (Note: Due to the COVID-19 pandemic, the International Triathlon Union (ITU) decided to award season titles to winners of the last event, held in Hamburg) | Men |
| Bronze medal – third place | 2023 season | Men |
Ironman 70.3 World Championship
| Bronze medal – third place | 2024 Taupō | Elite |
Europe Triathlon Championships
| Gold medal – first place | 2022 Munich | Individual |
| Gold medal – first place | 2022 Munich | Mixed relay |

Léo Bergère (French pronunciation: [leo bɛʁʒɛʁ]; born 28 June 1996) is a French professional triathlete.

He finished third at the 2020 World Triathlon Series, and qualified to compete at the 2020 Tōkyō Olympics, where he finished 21st in the men's triathlon. He was crowned world champion at November 2022 in Abu Dhabi, Yas Island during the 2022 World Triathlon Championship Finals. On 31 July 2024, he won the bronze medal at the 2024 Summer Olympics on home soil.

== Race results ==
The table shows the most significant podium results achieved on the international triathlon circuit since 2018 · .

Individual Results
| Year | Competition | Country | Position | Time |
|---|---|---|---|---|
| 2025 | WTCS Alghero | Italy | 3rd place, bronze medalist(s) | 01:45:09 |
| 2025 | T100 Triathlon – Singapore | Singapore | 2nd place, silver medalist(s) | 03:20:45 |
| 2024 | 2024 Ironman 70.3 World Championship | New Zealand | 3rd place, bronze medalist(s) | 03:35:08 |
| 2024 | 2024 Summer Olympics – Paris | France | 3rd place, bronze medalist(s) | 01:43:43 |
| 2024 | World Championship – Overall Ranking | | 3rd place, bronze medalist(s) | 3,728 points |
| 2024 | WTCS Torremolinos (Final) | Spain | 2nd place, silver medalist(s) | 01:43:24 |
| 2024 | WTCS Weihai | China | 2nd place, silver medalist(s) | 01:49:07 |
| 2024 | Ironman 70.3 Valencia | Spain | 1st place, gold medalist(s) | 03:40:27 |
| 2023 | World Championship – Overall Ranking | | 3rd place, bronze medalist(s) | 4,002 points |
| 2023 | WTCS Sunderland | United Kingdom | 2nd place, silver medalist(s) | 00:54:06 |
| 2023 | WTCS Cagliari | Italy | 3rd place, bronze medalist(s) | 01:37:05 |
| 2023 | Ironman 70.3 Oceanside | United States | 1st place, gold medalist(s) | 03:45:25 |
| 2022 | World Championship – Overall Ranking | | 1st place, gold medalist(s) | 4,741 points |
| 2022 | 2022 European Triathlon Championships | Germany | 1st place, gold medalist(s) | 01:41:09 |
| 2022 | WTCS Abu Dhabi | United Arab Emirates | 1st place, gold medalist(s) | 01:44:14 |
| 2022 | WTCS Montreal | Canada | 3rd place, bronze medalist(s) | 00:21:59 |
| 2022 | WTCS Yokohama | Japan | 3rd place, bronze medalist(s) | 01:43:59 |
| 2022 | WTCS Leeds | United Kingdom | 2nd place, silver medalist(s) | 00:53:28 |
| 2022 | Ironman 70.3 Lanzarote | Spain | 1st place, gold medalist(s) | 03:55:43 |
| 2021 | WTS Final Edmonton | Canada | 3rd place, bronze medalist(s) | 01:44:15 |
| 2021 | WTS Montreal | Canada | 3rd place, bronze medalist(s) | 00:22:11 |
| 2021 | WTS Hamburg | Germany | 3rd place, bronze medalist(s) | 00:53:09 |
| 2021 | European Cup – Melilla | Spain | 1st place, gold medalist(s) | 00:49:06 |
| 2020 | World Championship – Short Distance | Germany | 3rd place, bronze medalist(s) | 00:49:18 |
| 2020 | French Championship – Short Distance | France | 1st place, gold medalist(s) | 00:52:35 |
| 2018 | European Cup – Quarteira | Portugal | 2nd place, silver medalist(s) | 01:50:45 |

Mixed Relay Results
| Year | Competition | Country | Position | Time |
|---|---|---|---|---|
| 2022 | 2022 European Triathlon Championships | Germany | 1st place, gold medalist(s) | 01:25:30 |
| 2022 | WTS Leeds | United Kingdom | 3rd place, bronze medalist(s) | 01:28:20 |
| 2020 | World Triathlon Mixed Relay Championships | Germany | 1st place, gold medalist(s) | 01:18:25 |
| 2019 | World Triathlon Mixed Relay Championships | Germany | 1st place, gold medalist(s) | 01:20:18 |
| 2019 | European Triathlon Mixed Relay Championships | Netherlands | 1st place, gold medalist(s) | 01:11:40 |
| 2018 | WTS Nottingham | United Kingdom | 3rd place, bronze medalist(s) | 01:21:57 |
