= Alex Yee =

British professional triathlete (born 1998)

Alex Yee MBE
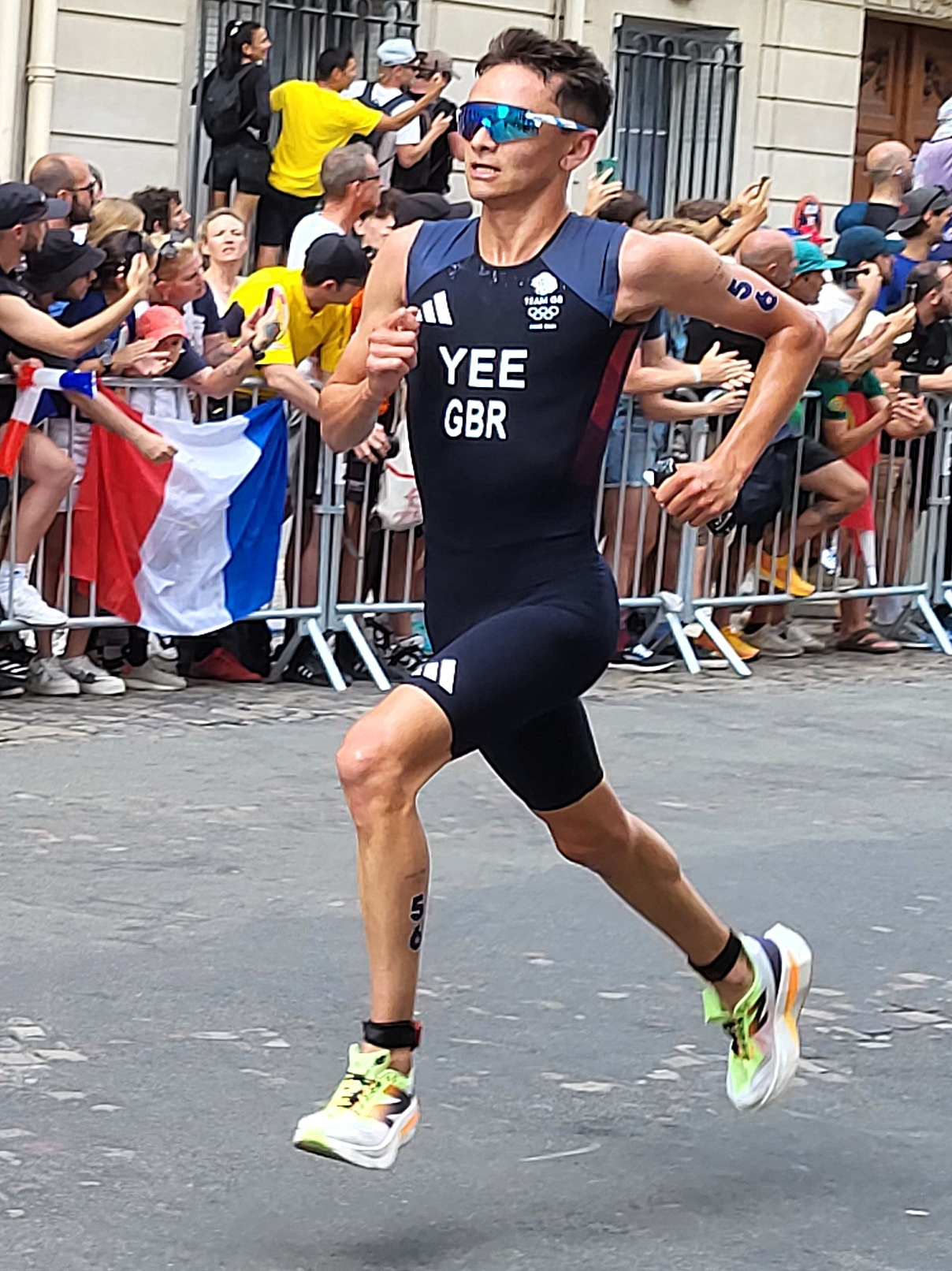
- Yee racing at the 2024 Summer Olympics

Personal information
- Full name: Alexander Amos Yee
- Born: 18 February 1998 (age 28) Lewisham, London, England, UK

Chinese name
- Chinese: 余力生
Medal record
Men's triathlon
Representing Great Britain
Olympic Games
Gold medal – first place	2020 Tokyo	Mixed relay
Gold medal – first place	2024 Paris	Individual
Silver medal – second place	2020 Tokyo	Individual
Bronze medal – third place	2024 Paris	Mixed relay
World Triathlon Series
Gold medal – first place	2024 season	Men
Silver medal – second place	2022 season	Men
Bronze medal – third place	2021 season	Men
World Sprint Championships
Gold medal – first place	2022 Montréal	Individual
Silver medal – second place	2022 Montréal	Mixed relay
Bronze medal – third place	2023 Hamburg	Individual
Esports World Triathlon Championship
Gold medal – first place	2022 Arena Games Series	Individual
Representing England
Men's triathlon
Commonwealth Games
Gold medal – first place	2022 Birmingham	Individual
Gold medal – first place	2022 Birmingham	Mixed relay

Alexander Amos Yee (born 18 February 1998) is a British professional triathlete and distance runner. He is the 2024 World and Olympic champion in standard or 'Olympic' distance triathlon, the second man to win both titles in a single year.

He won the gold medal in the Men's Triathlon at the 2024 Summer Olympics in Paris, the silver medal in the same event at the Tokyo 2020 Olympics, the gold medal in the Triathlon Mixed Relay at the Tokyo 2020 Olympics, and the bronze medal in the same event at the 2024 Summer Olympics in Paris. With two golds, one silver, and one bronze medal, Yee is the most successful triathlete in Olympic history.

Yee was also the 2022 Commonwealth Games triathlon champion in both the men's and mixed team events. In addition to his overall victory in 2024, he is a double World Championship medalist over the World Triathlon Championship Series, with silver in 2022, and bronze in 2021.

In 2022, Yee won his first individual World Championship, the 2022 World Triathlon Sprint Championships in Montreal in Canada. Yee has also been part of the gold medal-winning relay team in the World Triathlon Mixed Relay Championships in Nottingham in 2019. He won silver in the same event in Montreal, securing Great Britain its first quota places in the 2024 Summer Olympics.

In 2022, he became the inaugural Esport Triathlon World Champion, after finishing second at both the London and the Singapore Arena Games Triathlon event.

As a distance runner, Yee was the 2018 British 10,000m champion, and led Great Britain to the team silver medal in the European 10,000m Cup as both races were combined as part of the Night of 10,000m PBs festival event at Parliament Hill. He represented Great Britain in the subsequent European Athletics Championships. Returning to road racing after his 2024 triathlon double, he ran his first London Marathon in 2025.

== Early life and education ==
Yee was born on 18 February 1998, to a Mozambique-born Chinese father, Ron Yee and English mother, Emma Amos Yee. He was raised in Lewisham, London, and attended Stillness Infant School and Stillness Junior School in Brockley. He studied at Kingsdale Foundation School in West Dulwich and then went on to study for a BSc in Sport and Exercise Science at Leeds Beckett University. In July 2025, Yee was awarded an honorary doctorate by his former university for his sporting achievements.

== Career ==
=== 2016–2019 ===
On 4 June 2016 Yee won the ITU World Junior Duathlon Championships in Avilés in northern Spain. As a result, he was shortlisted for the SportsAid "One to Watch" award which he went on to win, receiving his award from Sir Mo Farah at the ceremony in November.

At the ITU Triathlon World Cup race in Cagliari in Sardinia, Italy on 4 June 2017, Yee tangled with another competitor on the bike and crashed into a concrete bollard, suffering broken ribs and vertebrae and a pneumothorax (collapsed lung). On 19 May 2018 Yee set a PB (Personal Best) in the 10,000m of 27:51.94, less than five seconds outside the British under-23 record of 27:47.0 set in 1971 by Dave Bedford. Earlier in the year, Yee set the then second quickest ever Parkrun time, clocking 13:57 at Dulwich.

Yee started his 2018 triathlon season off with a 6th place at the Gran Canaria ETU Sprint Triathlon European Cup, following this with an 8th place at the Cagliari ITU World Cup, returning to the site of his accident a year prior. June saw him compete at Antwerp, registering a disappointing 49th place (despite producing the fastest run split), and then in September he competed in the U23 category at the ITU World Triathlon Grand Final in Gold Coast, coming home 10th. Later the same month he made it onto the podium for the first and only time in 2018, taking bronze at the ITU World Cup in Weihai in China.

Yee made his debut in the ITU World Triathlon Series at Abu Dhabi with a sprint-distance race on 8 March 2019. After a strong swim and bike he recorded the second-fastest 5 km run of the race to finish second to Mario Mola in a race that saw 9 DNFs. In the build-up to the race, Yee confirmed his view that he was a triathlete first and foremost, despite being a nationally ranked runner, and stated his intentions to qualify for the 2020 Tokyo Olympics. Following this he took on his first ITU World Triathlon Series Standard Distance event at Yokohama in Japan, finishing in 5th overall. Later the same year, he went on to record a Gold in Nottingham in the Mixed Team relay in June in less-than-ideal weather conditions, resulting in the race being altered to a duathlon format (run, bike, run). Georgia Taylor-Brown took the first leg, followed by Ben Dijkstra, Sophie Coldwell in leg 3 and Yee on the anchor leg to seal the victory ahead of Switzerland in Silver and France in Bronze.

Team GB recorded a Silver two months later in the same discipline in Tokyo, with Yee being beaten at the line on the final leg by Dorian Coninx representing France. The line-up was altered from that fielded at Nottingham, with Jess Learmonth, Gordon Benson, Sophie Coldwell and Yee on the final leg. This success followed a disappointing result in July in Hamburg where the team finished 10th overall, with the team comprising Jess Learmonth, Jonny Brownlee, Georgia Taylor-Brown and Yee on the final leg. Learmonth encountered problems on the swim, resulting in Team GB entering T1 in 15th place and unable to make up the deficit on subsequent legs. Individually, Yee finished the season recording a 13th-place finish at the Grand Final in Lausanne in Switzerland, and an overall ITU WTS ranking of 12th, recording 2521 points from 5 races.

=== 2020–2024 ===
On 8 August 2020, in the Podium 5 km at Barrowford, Lancashire, Yee ran 13:26 behind winner Marc Scott in 13:20, the second fastest 5 km time ever by a British athlete. Later in the month, Yee ran a personal best of 7:45.81 over 3000 metres at the Bromley Twilight Meeting. Yee started his 2020 race programme as one of four male GB athletes at the ITU World Cup race at Mooloolaba in Australia, recording the fastest run time of 14:55 but only achieving a 37th-place finish overall due to a mechanical prior to T2.

Yee won the silver medal in the 2020 Tokyo Olympics, held in 2021, as well as a gold medal in the mixed triathlon, in which he was the competitor to cross the finish line for the team. Yee was appointed Member of the Order of the British Empire (MBE) in the 2022 New Year Honours for services to triathlon.

Yee won the 2021 Super League Triathlon Championship Series. He took victory in the final race of the series, held in Malibu, California, crossing the line just fractions of a second ahead of Belgium's Marten Van Riel. He also took the win at the Super League Triathlon, Jersey race, earlier in the season, finishing ahead of teammate Jonathan Brownlee in the process. Yee also finished second in the SLT Arena Games, Rotterdam 2021.

Yee competed in Super League Triathlon's Arena Games Triathlon Powered by Zwift Esports Triathlon series in 2022. The series will go on to crown the first ever triathlon Esports World Champion. At the first event of the series, held at Munich's Olympiapark, Yee finished in 6th. However, following a rule change at the next event, held at Queen Elizabeth Olympic Park London, Yee finished in 2nd, being narrowly beaten by Germany's Justus Nieschlag. At the final event of the series, held at Marina Bay, Singapore, Yee finished in second place behind New Zealand's Hayden Wilde. However, that was enough to see him take the win in the overall series, giving him the title of inaugural Esport Triathlon World Champion.

At the 2022 Commonwealth Games, Yee won the first gold medal of the Games by in triathlon. He emerged from the swim in 15th place, and chased down leader Hayden Wilde in the run to win his first major race of the season by 13 seconds. The win came with some controversy, as it was felt that the race should have had a much closer finish, as Yee and Wilde had been running neck-and-neck in the final stages of the sprint, until Wilde was made to serve a 10-second penalty immediately before the finish for unbuckling his helmet strap before his bike had been properly racked in transition, for which "video evidence for the supposed misdemeanor remain(ed) inconclusive".

Yee won a second Commonwealth Games gold in the mixed relay with Sophie Coldwell, Sam Dickinson, and Georgia Taylor-Brown. He started in the first leg of the race to give the second leg a 20-second lead, which the team held on to win the race. Yee competed as a wildcard at the opening event of the 2022 Super League Triathlon championship series in London. He finished the event in 3rd, behind Matthew Hauser and Hayden Wilde.

Yee won the gold medal in the triathlon at the 2024 Paris Olympics. Yee also took home the bronze medal in the team relay, alongside Georgia Taylor-Brown, Sam Dickinson and Beth Potter.

He was one of the Great Britain flag-bearers at the closing ceremony alongside trampoline gymnast Bryony Page.

=== 2025 ===
On 27 April, Yee completed his first competitive marathon, running the London Marathon in 2:11:08. He was the second British runner to finish in the Elite men's race, and placed fourteenth overall and simultaneously winning silver in the 2025 British Athletics Championships marathon.

Yee finished seventh at the Valencia Marathon on 7 December, in a time of 2:06:38 which placed him second on the British all-time list behind only Mo Farah.

== ITU World Triathlon Series Competitions ==
Yee's ITU World Triathlon Series race results are:;

Results list

Date	Competition	Place	Rank
2019-08-31	World Triathlon Series	Grand Final Lausanne	13
2019-08-16	World Triathlon Series	Tokyo Olympic Qualification Event	33
2019-03-08	World Triathlon Series	Abu Dhabi	02

== ITU Triathlon World Cup Competitions ==
Yee's ITU Triathlon World Cup Series race results are:;

Results list

Date	Competition	Place	Rank
2020-03-14	World Cup	Mooloolaba	37
2018-09-22	World Cup	Weihai	03
2018-06-17	World Cup	Antwerp	49
2018-06-02	World Cup	Cagliari	08
2018-06-02	World Cup	Cagliari	08

== Full list of triathlon results ==
As of 15 October 2025.

Date	Event	Discipline	Position	Time
04 July 2015	2015 Holten ETU Triathlon Junior European Cup	Jr. men's individual	2nd place, silver medalist(s)	00:57:33
08 August 2015	2015 Tiszaujvaros ETU Triathlon Junior European Cup	Jr. men's individual	LAP	LAP
02 April 2016	2016 Quarteira ETU Triathlon Junior European Cup	Jr. men's individual	3rd place, bronze medalist(s)	00:56:39
26 May 2016	2016 Lisbon ETU Triathlon European Championships	Mixed Junior Relay	1st place, gold medalist(s)	n/c
26 May 2016	2016 Lisbon ETU Triathlon European Championships	Jr. men's individual	5	00:58:18
04 June 2016	2016 Aviles ITU Duathlon World Championships	Jr. men's individual	1st place, gold medalist(s)	00:51:40
14 August 2016	2016 GBR Sprint Triathlon National Championships	Jr. men's individual	2nd place, silver medalist(s)	00:56:04
14 August 2016	2016 GBR Sprint Triathlon National Championships	Men's individual	6	00:56:04
11 September 2016	2016 ITU World Triathlon Grand Final Cozumel	Jr. men's individual	5	00:54:24
29 April 2017	2017 Soria ETU Duathlon European Championships	Jr. men's individual	1st place, gold medalist(s)	00:53:28
04 June 2017	2017 Cagliari ITU Triathlon World Cup	Men's individual	DNF	DNF
18 March 2018	2018 Gran Canaria ETU Sprint Triathlon European Cup	Men's individual	6	00:56:21
02 June 2018	2018 Cagliari ITU Triathlon World Cup	Men's individual	8	00:55:19
17 June 2018	2018 Antwerp ITU Triathlon World Cup	Men's individual	49	01:01:34
12 September 2018	2018 ITU World Triathlon Grand Final Gold Coast	U23 men's individual	10	01:45:41
22 September 2018	2018 Weihai ITU Triathlon World Cup	Men's individual	3rd place, bronze medalist(s)	01:53:30
09 February 2019	2019 Discovery Triathlon World Cup Cape Town	Men's individual	1st place, gold medalist(s)	00:52:04
08 March 2019	2019 Daman World Triathlon Abu Dhabi	Men's individual	2nd place, silver medalist(s)	00:52:03
09 March 2019	2019 Daman World Triathlon Mixed Relay Series Abu Dhabi	Mixed Relay	7	00:20:20
18 May 2019	2019 ITU World Triathlon Yokohama	Men's individual	5	01:43:57
08 June 2019	2019 AJ Bell World Triathlon Leeds	Men's individual	15	01:46:16
15 June 2019	2019 Accenture World Triathlon Mixed Relay Series Nottingham	Mixed Relay	1st place, gold medalist(s)	00:19:52
06 July 2019	2019 Hamburg Wasser World Triathlon	Men's individual	43	00:57:25
07 July 2019	2019 Hamburg ITU Triathlon Mixed Relay World Championships	Mixed Relay	10	00:19:57
15 August 2019	2019 Tokyo ITU World Triathlon Olympic Qualification Event	Men's individual	33	01:54:01
18 August 2019	2019 ITU World Triathlon Mixed Relay Series Tokyo	Mixed Relay	2nd place, silver medalist(s)	00:20:46
29 August 2019	2019 ITU World Triathlon Grand Final Lausanne	Men's individual	13	01:53:26
29 August 2019	2019 ITU World Triathlon Grand Final Lausanne	Mixed U23-Junior Relay	2nd place, silver medalist(s)	00:17:38
14 March 2020	2020 Mooloolaba ITU Triathlon World Cup	Men's individual	37	00:55:13
05 September 2020	2020 Hamburg Wasser World Triathlon	Men's individual	5	00:49:24
06 September 2020	2020 Hamburg ITU Triathlon Mixed Relay World Championships	Mixed Relay	3rd place, bronze medalist(s)	00:19:27
15 May 2021	2021 World Triathlon Championship Series Yokohama	Men's individual	4	01:43:17
05 June 2021	AJ Bell 2021 World Triathlon Championship Series Leeds	Men's individual	1st place, gold medalist(s)	01:43:27
26 July 2021	Tokyo 2020 Olympic Games	Men's individual	2nd place, silver medalist(s)	01:45:15
26 July 2021	Tokyo 2020 Olympic Games	Mixed Relay	1st place, gold medalist(s)	00:20:28
21 August 2021	2021 World Triathlon Championship Finals Edmonton	Men's individual	11	01:44:53
09 April 2022	2022 Arena Games Triathlon Series Munich powered by Zwift	Men's individual	6	00:34:48
23 April 2022	2022 Arena Games Triathlon Series London powered by Zwift	Men's individual	2nd place, silver medalist(s)	00:34:12
06 May 2022	2022 Arena Games Triathlon Finals Singapore powered by Zwift	Men's individual	2nd place, silver medalist(s)	00:36:42
14 May 2022	2022 World Triathlon Championship Series Yokohama	Men's individual	1st place, gold medalist(s)	01:43:30
11 June 2022	2022 World Triathlon Championship Series Leeds	Men's individual	DNF	DNF
24 June 2022	2022 World Triathlon Sprint and Relay Championships Montreal	Mixed Relay	2nd place, silver medalist(s)	00:20:29
24 June 2022	2022 World Triathlon Sprint and Relay Championships Montreal	Men's individual	1st place, gold medalist(s)	00:21:55
29 July 2022	2022 Birmingham Commonwealth Games	Mixed Relay	1st place, gold medalist(s)	00:17:27
29 July 2022	2022 Birmingham Commonwealth Games	Men's individual	1st place, gold medalist(s)	00:50:34
08 October 2022	2022 World Triathlon Championship Series Cagliari	Men's individual	1st place, gold medalist(s)	01:40:19
05 November 2022	2022 World Triathlon Championship Series Bermuda	Men's individual	5	01:50:04
24 November 2022	2022 World Triathlon Championship Finals Abu Dhabi	Men's individual	4	01:44:37
03 March 2023	2023 World Triathlon Championship Series Abu Dhabi	Men's individual	1st place, gold medalist(s)	00:52:53
27 May 2023	2023 World Triathlon Championship Series Cagliari	Men's individual	1st place, gold medalist(s)	01:36:28
15 July 2023	2023 World Triathlon Sprint and Relay Championships Hamburg	Men's individual	3rd place, bronze medalist(s)	00:19:28
17 August 2023	2023 World Triathlon Olympic Games Test Event Paris	Men's individual	1st place, gold medalist(s)	01:41:02
20 August 2023	2023 World Triathlon Mixed Relay Series Paris	Mixed Relay	2nd place, silver medalist(s)	00:17:48
22 September 2023	2023 World Triathlon Championship Finals Pontevedra	Men's individual	30	01:45:02
25 May 2024	2024 World Triathlon Championship Series Cagliari	Men's individual	1st place, gold medalist(s)	01:39:44
14 June 2024	2024 Europe Triathlon Cup Kitzbuhel	Men's individual	1st place, gold medalist(s)	00:31:55
30 July 2024	Paris 2024 Olympic Games	Mixed Relay	3rd place, bronze medalist(s)	00:20:03
30 July 2024	Paris 2024 Olympic Games	Men's individual	1st place, gold medalist(s)	01:43:33
27 September 2024	2024 World Triathlon Championship Series Weihai	Men's individual	1st place, gold medalist(s)	01:48:21
17 October 2024	2024 World Triathlon Championship Finals Torremolinos-Andalucia	Men's individual	3rd place, bronze medalist(s)	01:43:50
31 August 2025	2025 World Triathlon Championship Series French Riviera	Men's individual	9	00:51:49
