= Triathlon at the 2020 Summer Olympics =

Triathlon at the Games of the XXXII Olympiad
- Venue: Odaiba Marine Park
- Dates: 26–31 July 2021
- No. of events: 3
- Competitors: 111

The triathlon competitions at the 2020 Summer Olympics in Tokyo featured fifty-five athletes competing in each of the men's and women's events. The 2020 Summer Olympics were postponed to 2021 due to the COVID-19 pandemic. It also added the new mixed team relay event.

== Format ==
The Olympic triathlon contains three components; a 1.5 km (0.93 mi) swim, 40 km (25 mi) cycle, and a 10 km (6.2 mi) run. The competitions take the form of a single event between all competitors with no heats.

The new mixed team event features teams of four (two men and two women). Each athlete performs a triathlon of 300 m (980 ft) swim, 8 km (5.0 mi) cycle, and a 2 km (1.2 mi) run in a relay format.

== Qualification ==
The qualification period spanned from 11 May 2018 to 11 May 2020. A total of 110 athletes (55 for each gender) vied for the coveted spots with a maximum of three per gender for each NOC. Qualification places are awarded first through the ITU mixed relay rankings of 31 March 2020, with seven NOCs each earning four quota spots (two per gender). Three more NOCs can earn four quota spots apiece at the 2020 ITU Mixed Relay Olympic Qualification Event. Individual rankings of 11 May 2020 are considered next, with the top 26 individuals per gender qualifying, subject to the limit of three per NOC and ignoring the first two from each NOC that qualified via mixed teams. One additional spot for each continent will go to the highest-ranked competitor from an NOC that has not yet earned a qualifying spot. The host, Japan, is guaranteed two spots per gender. The final two spots per gender are awarded through Tripartite Commission invitations.

== Schedule ==
All times and dates use Japan Standard Time (UTC+9). All event times are subject to change.

Event	Date	Start time
Men's individual	26 July	06:30
Women's individual	27 July	06:30
Mixed relay	31 July	07:30

== Participating nations ==
The list shows the number of participating athletes from each nation.

- Argentina (1)
- Australia (6)
- Austria (4)
- Azerbaijan (1)
- Belgium (4)
- Bermuda (1)
- Brazil (3)
- Canada (5)
- Chile (2)
- China (1)
- Czech Republic (2)
- Egypt (1)
- Estonia (1)
- Ecuador (1)
- France (5)
- Germany (4)
- Great Britain (5)
- Hungary (4)
- Hong Kong (1)
- Ireland (2)
- Israel (2)
- Italy (5)
- **Japan (4)***
- Luxembourg (1)
- Morocco (1)
- Mexico (4)
- Netherlands (4)
- Norway (4)
- New Zealand (4)
- Portugal (3)
- ROC (4)
- Romania (1)
- Spain (5)
- South Africa (4)
- Switzerland (4)
- Syria (1)
- Ukraine (1)
- United States (5)

*Host nation indicated in bold.

== Medal summary ==
=== Medal table ===
Rank	Nation	Gold	Silver	Bronze	Total
1	Great Britain	1	2	0	3
2	Bermuda	1	0	0	1
2	Norway	1	0	0	1
4	United States	0	1	1	2
5	France	0	0	1	1
5	New Zealand	0	0	1	1
Totals (6 entries)		**3**	**3**	**3**	**9**

=== Events ===
Event	Gold		Silver		Bronze	
Men's individual	Kristian Blummenfelt; Norway	1:45:04	Alex Yee; Great Britain	1:45:15	Hayden Wilde; New Zealand	1:45:24
Women's individual	Flora Duffy; Bermuda	1:55:36	Georgia Taylor-Brown; Great Britain	1:56:50	Katie Zaferes; United States	1:57:03
Mixed relay	Great Britain; Jess Learmonth; Jonathan Brownlee; Georgia Taylor-Brown; Alex Yee	1:23:41	United States; Katie Zaferes; Kevin McDowell; Taylor Knibb; Morgan Pearson	1:23:55	France; Léonie Périault; Dorian Coninx; Cassandre Beaugrand; Vincent Luis	1:24:04

== See also ==
- Triathlon at the Summer Olympics
- Triathlon at the 2018 Asian Games
- Triathlon at the 2019 Pan American Games
- Paratriathlon at the 2020 Summer Paralympics
