= Jonas Schomburg =

German triathlete (born 1994)

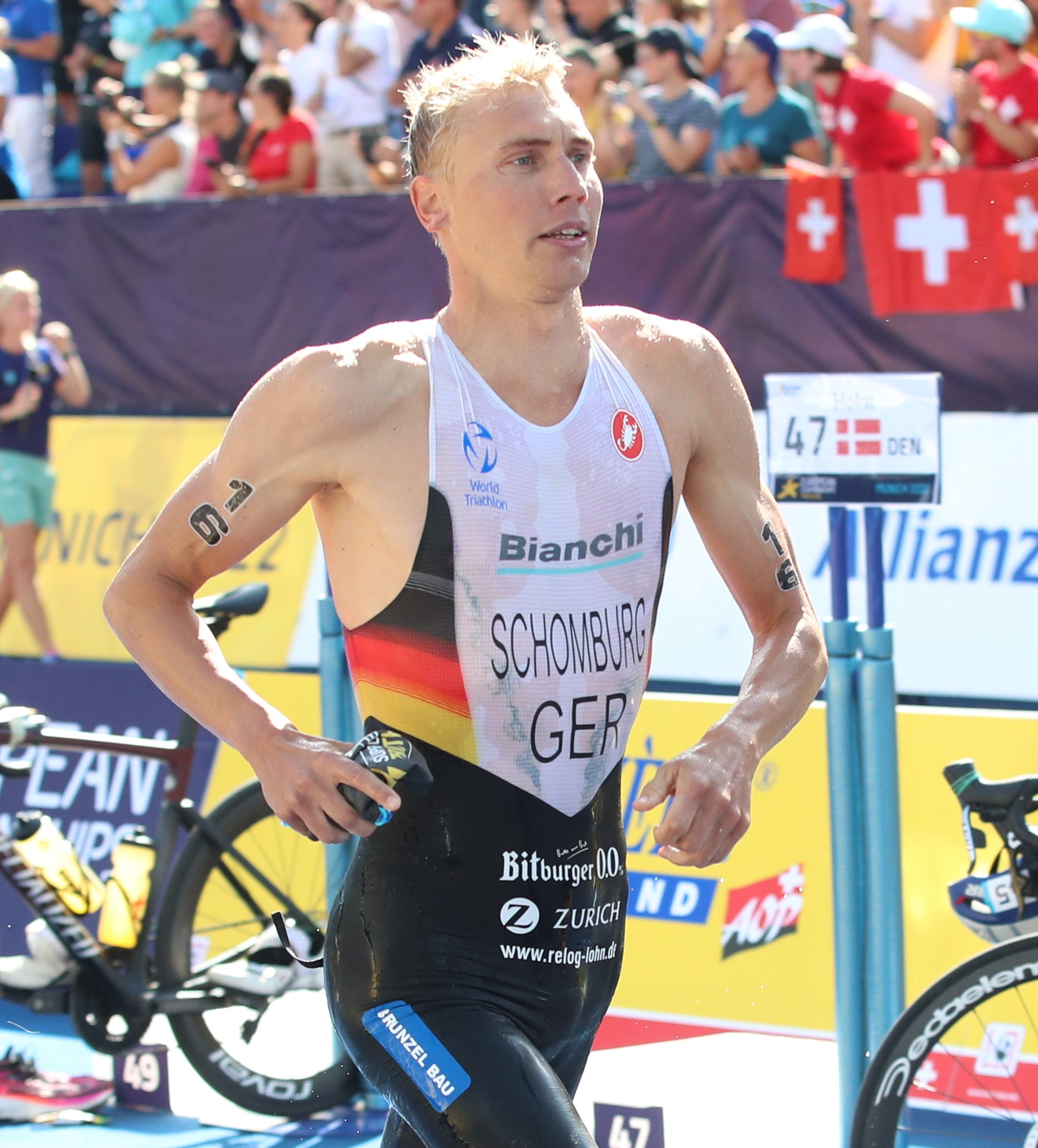

Personal information
- Nationality: German
- Born: 31 January 1994 (age 32) Hanover, Germany

Sport
- Sport: Triathlon

Jonas Schomburg (born 31 January 1994) is a German triathlete. He qualified to represent Germany at the 2020 Summer Olympics in Tokyo 2021.

== Notable Achievements ==
- 5th place at the 2019 Weihai ITU Triathlon World Cup

- 9th place at the 2019 Tokyo ITU World Triathlon Olympic Qualification Event

- 2nd place at the 2019 GER Sprint Triathlon National Championships

- 9th place at the 2019 Madrid ITU Triathlon World Cup

- 1st place at the 2018 Mariental ATU Triathlon African Cup

- 2nd place at the 2025 Challenge Roth
