= Max Studer =

Swiss triathlete

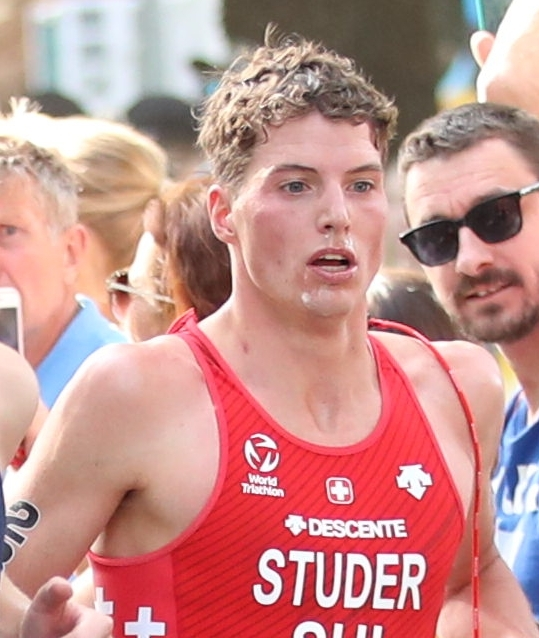

Personal information
- Nationality: Swiss
- Born: 16 January 1996 (age 30)

Sport
- Sport: Triathlon
Medal record
Men's triathlon
Representing Switzerland
World Championships
Silver medal – second place	2024 Hambrg	Mixed relay
Bronze medal – third place	2023 Hambrg	Mixed relay
European Championships
Gold medal – first place	2025 Istanbul	Individual
Bronze medal – third place	2022 Munich	Mixed relay

Max Studer (born 16 January 1996) is a Swiss triathlete. He competed in the men's event at the 2020 Summer Olympics held in Tokyo, Japan. He also competed in the mixed relay event.
