= Marten Van Riel =

Belgian triathlete

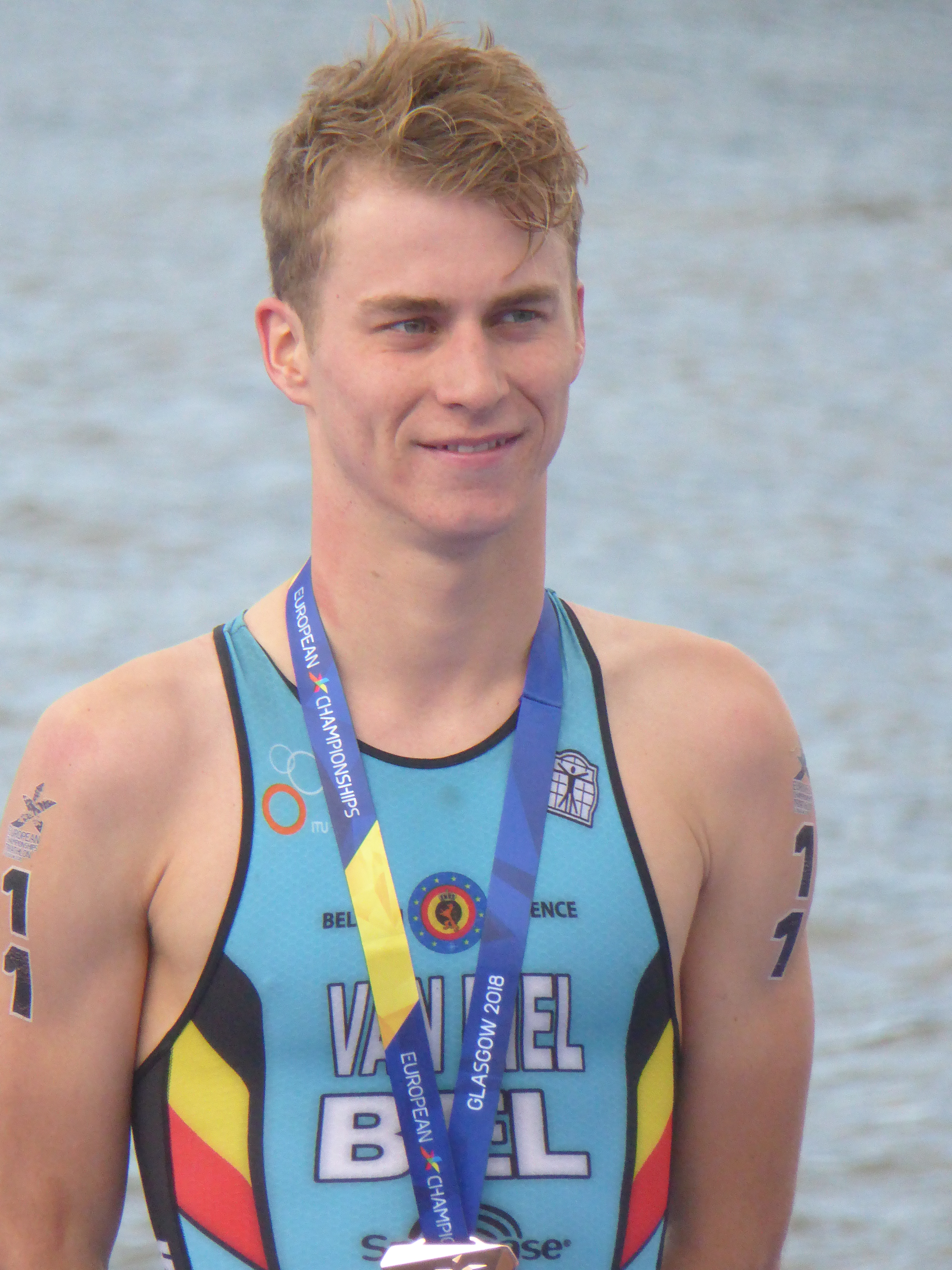
- Van Riel at the 2018 European Triathlon Championships

Personal information
- Born: 15 December 1992 (age 33) Loenhout, Antwerp, Belgium
- Height: 183 cm (6 ft 0 in)
- Weight: 65 kg (143 lb)

Sport
- Country: Belgium
- Sport: Triathlon
Medal record
Men's triathlon
Representing Belgium
World Triathlon Series
Silver medal – second place	2021 season	Men
European Championships
Bronze medal – third place	2018 Glasgow	Individual
Bronze medal – third place	2018 Glasgow	Mixed team relay
Military World Games
Silver medal – second place	2019 Wuhan	Individual
Super League Triathlon
Gold medal – first place	2021 London	SLT Arena Games
Gold medal – first place	2021 Rotterdam	SLT Arena Games

Marten Van Riel (born 15 December 1992) is a Belgian professional triathlete.

== Biography ==
Van Riel was born in Loenhout, Antwerp. He competed in the men's event at the 2016 Summer Olympics. He ended sixth. In 2018, he won bronze medals at the 2018 European Triathlon Championships in the men's individual and mixed team relay events. He competed in Triathlon at the 2020 Tokyo Olympic Games and finished 4th and at the 2024 Paris Olympic Games and finished 22nd.

In 2019, he won the silver medal in the men's triathlon at the 2019 Military World Games held in Wuhan, China.

Van Riel also competes in Super League Triathlon. He won both of the Super League Triathlon Arena Games races in 2021.

In March 2022, Marten Van Riel won the Ironman 70.3 in Dubai. He complete the race in 3h27'40.

In 2024, Marten Van Riel became the first T100 World Champion. He finished second once and first three times during the season, including the Grand Final in Dubai.
