= Vincent Luis =

French triathlete

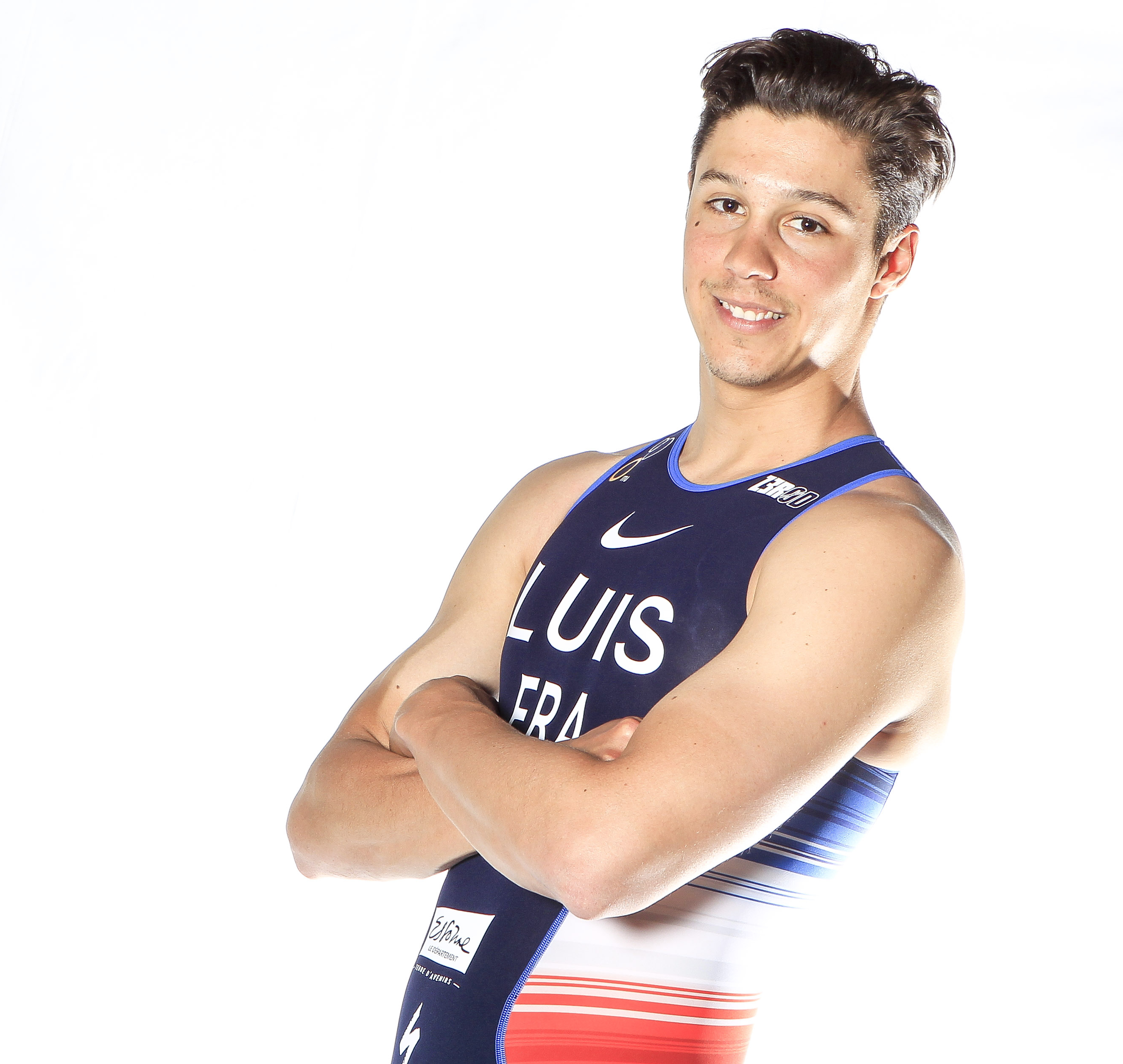
- Luis in 2017

Personal information
- Full name: Vincent Antoine Luis
- Born: 27 June 1989 (age 37) Vesoul, France
- Height: 1.77 m (5 ft 10 in)
- Weight: 66 kg (146 lb)

Sport
- Country: France
- Sport: Triathlon
- Club: Sainte Geneviève Triathlon
- Coached by: Joël Filliol
Medal record
Men's triathlon
Representing France
Olympic Games
Bronze medal – third place	2020 Tokyo	Mixed relay
World Triathlon Series
Gold medal – first place	2019 season	Men
Gold medal – first place	2020 Hamburg (F) (Note: Due to the COVID-19 pandemic, the International Triathlon Union (ITU) decided to award season titles to winners of the last event, held in Hamburg)	Men
Silver medal – second place	2018 season	Men
Super League Triathlon
Gold medal – first place	2018 events	Men's overall
Gold medal – first place	2019 events	Men's overall
Ironman World Championships
Gold medal – first place	2026 Kona	Elite
Europe Triathlon Sprint Championships
Gold medal – first place	2016 Châteauroux	Individual

Vincent Antoine Luis (born 27 June 1989) is a French professional triathlete and winner of the 2026 Ironman Kona World Championship. Besides his many WTS wins and his participation in the 2012 Summer Olympics and 2016 Summer Olympics, he won the ITU World Championship in 2019 and 2020, and the Mixed Relay Team World Championship with the French national team in 2015, 2018 and 2019. He won the Junior World Championship and Junior European Championship in 2008, as well as multiple French national titles over the years.

Luis also competes in Super League Triathlon. He was dominant in the early years of the league, winning both the 2018 and 2019 Super League Triathlon Championship. He finished 5th in the 2021 Championship Series. His dominance, and 2020 Tokyo Olympic bid, were the subject of the 2021 docuseries Invincible.

In October 2026, Luis became triathlon world champion by winning the Ironman Hawai'i directly on his first appearance at the race.

== Early career ==
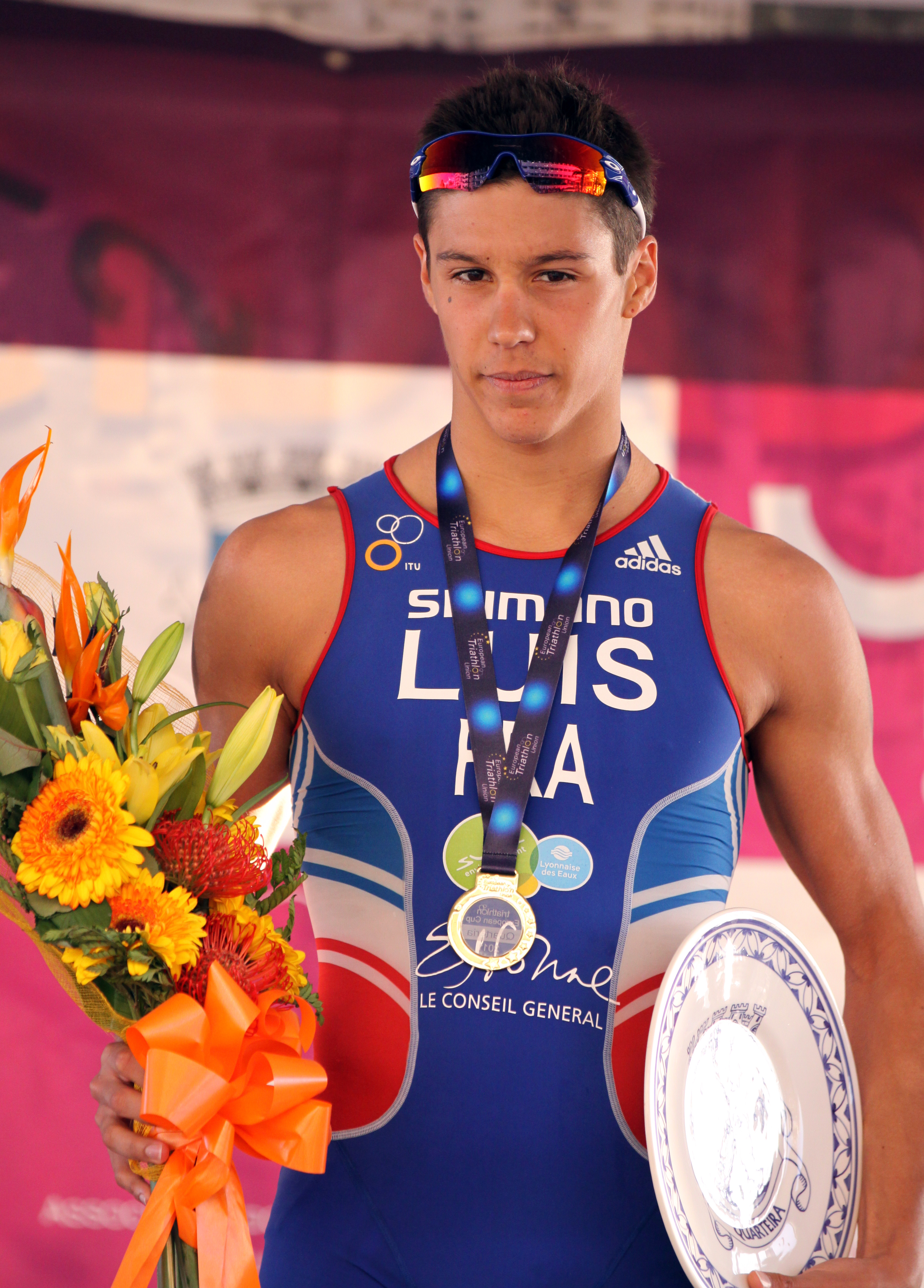
Luis, gold medalist at the European Cup in Quarteira, 2011.

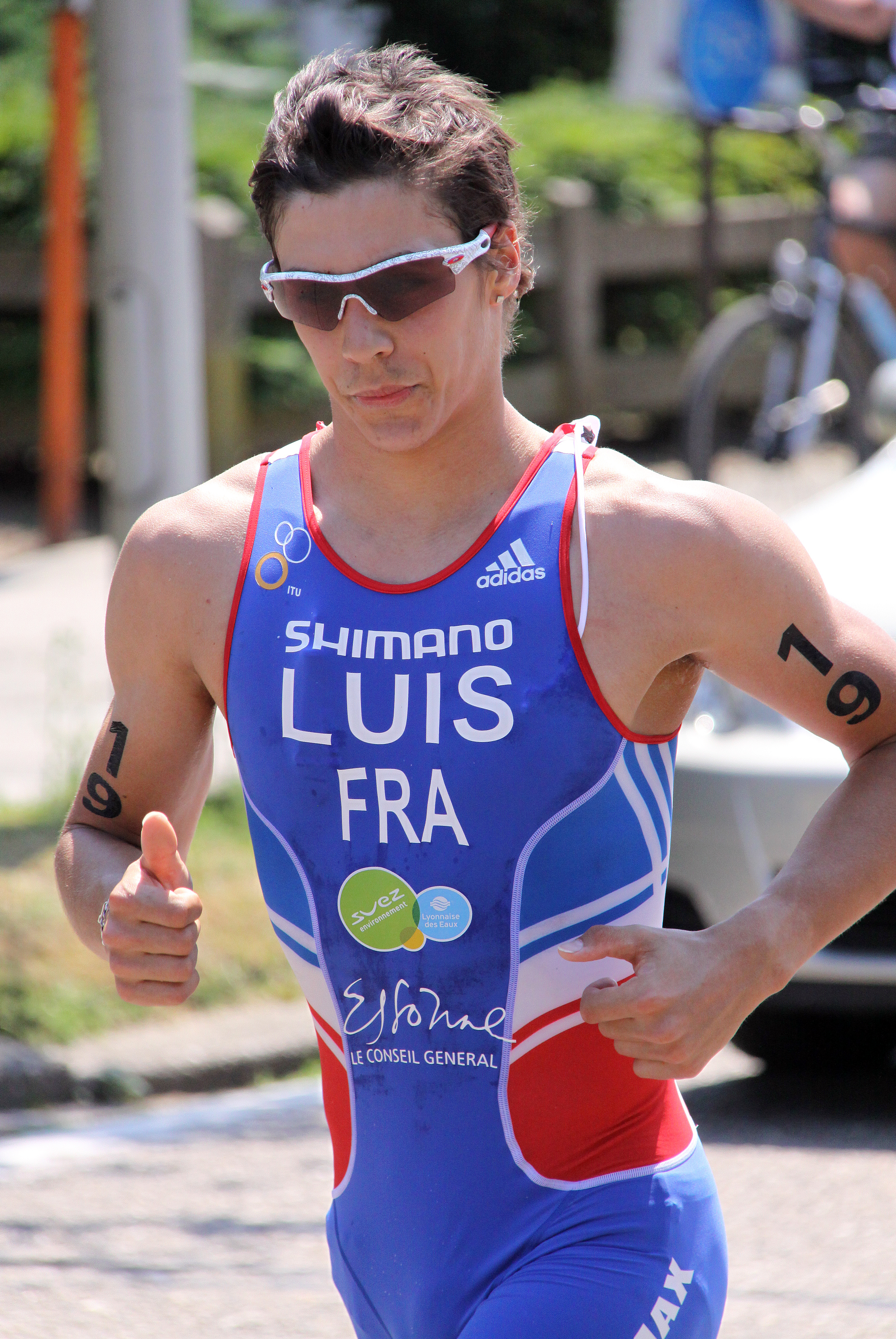
Luis at the Premium European Cup in Brasschaat, 2010.

In the six years from 2006 to 2010, Luis took part in 23 ITU competitions and achieved 13 top ten positions.

The following list is based upon the official ITU Profile Page. Unless indicated otherwise, the following competitions are Olympic Distance Triathlons in the Elite category.

Date	Competition	Place	Rank
2005-07-23	European Championships (Junior)	Alexandroupoli	DNF
2006-06-23	European Championships (Junior)	Autun	5
2006-09-02	World Championships (Junior)	Lausanne	14
2007-06-29	European Championships (Junior)	Copenhagen	6
2007-08-30	BG World Championships (Junior)	Hamburg	3
2007-10-24	Premium European Cup	Alanya	27
2008-05-10	European Championships (Junior)	Lisbon	1
2008-06-05	BG World Championships (Junior)	Vancouver	1
2008-07-12	European Cup	Athlone	1
2008-09-27	BG World Cup	Lorient	23
2009-04-05	European Cup	Quarteira	33
2009-05-17	Premium European Cup	Pontevedra	6
2009-06-20	European Championships (U23)	Tarzo	7
2009-07-18	European Cup	Athlone	7
2009-08-09	World Cup	Tiszaújváros	26
2009-09-09	Dextro Energy World Championship Series, Grand Final: U23 World Championships	Gold Coast	17
2010-05-23	European Cup	Strathclyde	7
2010-06-27	Premium European Cup	Brasschaat	27
2010-07-10	World Cup	Holten	40
2010-08-15	European Cup	Geneva	1
2010-08-28	European Championships (U23)	Vila Nova de Gaia (Porto)	DNF
2010-09-08	Dextro Energy World Championship Series, Grand Final: U23 World Championships	Budapest	7
2010-10-16	World Cup	Tongyeong	3
2011-03-26	World Cup	Mooloolaba	22
2011-04-09	European Cup	Quarteira	1

BG = the sponsor British Gas · DNF = did not finish · DNS = did not start
