= Verena Steinhauser =

Italian triathlete (born 1994)

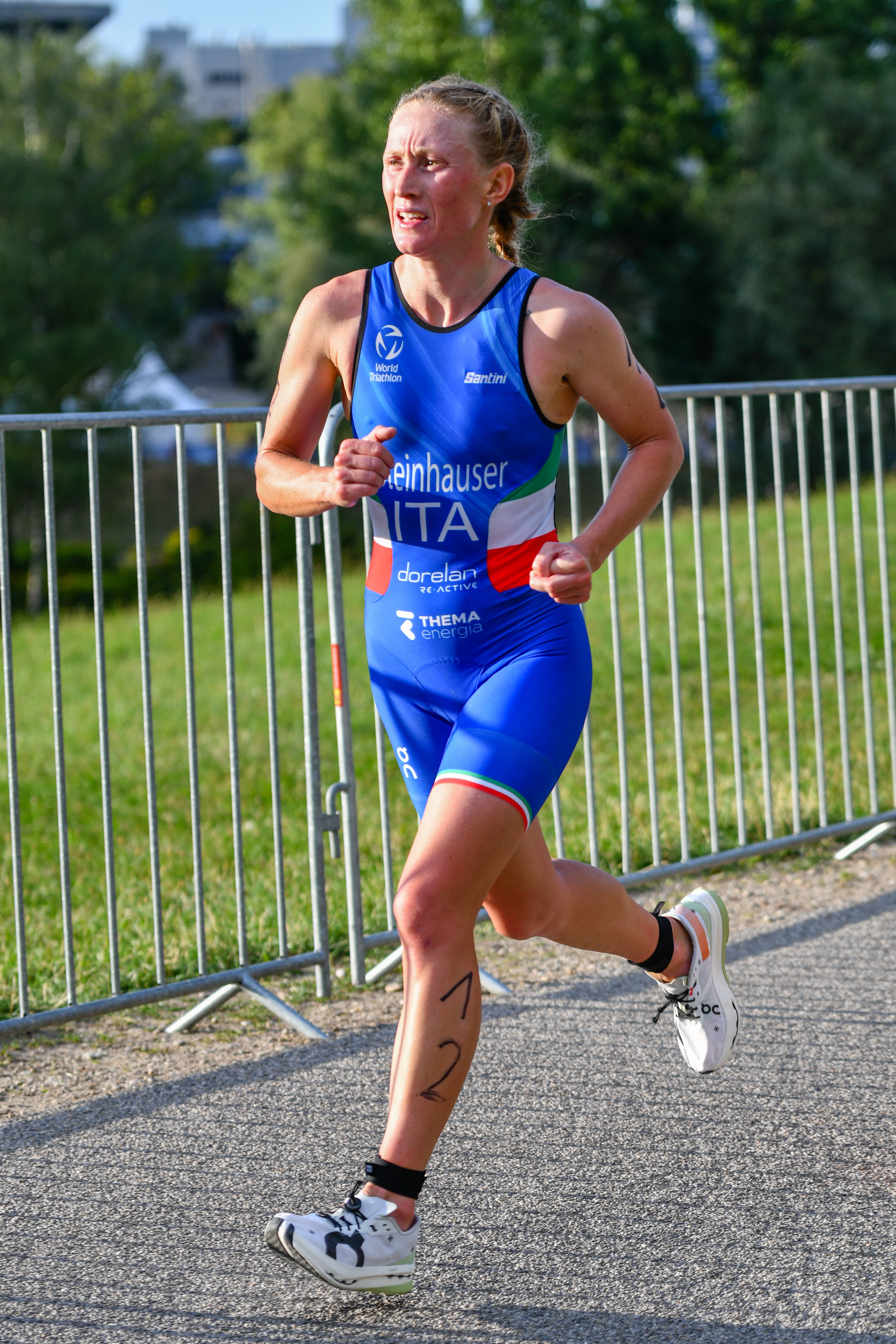

Personal information
- Nationality: Italian
- Born: 14 October 1994 (age 30); Brixen, Italy

Sport
- Sport: Triathlon

Verena Steinhauser (born 14 October 1994) is an Italian triathlete. She competed in the women's event at the 2020 Summer Olympics held in Tokyo, Japan. She also competed in the mixed relay event.

She competed in the women's triathlon at the 2024 Summer Olympics in Paris, France.
