= Léonie Périault =

French triathlete (born 1994)

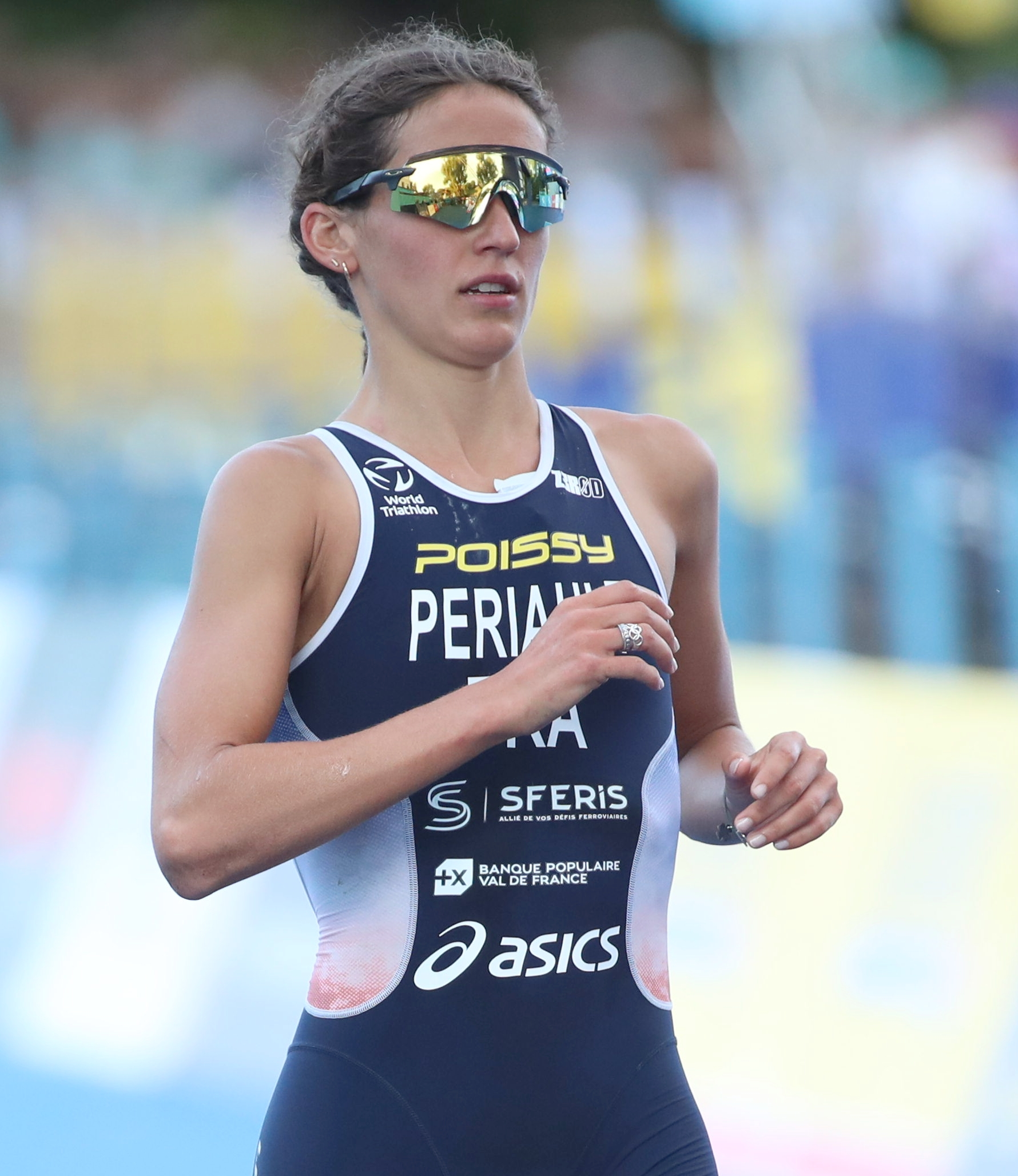
- Léonie Périault

Personal information
- Born: July 31, 1994 (age 32)

Sport
- Country: France
- Sport: Triathlon
Medal record
Women's triathlon
Representing France
Olympic Games
Bronze medal – third place	2020 Tokyo	Mixed relay
European Championships
Silver medal – second place	2024 Vichy	Women's

Léonie Périault (born 31 July 1994) is a French triathlete. Mixed relay world champion with the French team in 2018 and 2020. She finished 5th in the women's triathlon at the 2020 Summer Olympics in Tokyo. She subsequently won a bronze medal in the mixed triathlon relay event on 31 July 2021.

She competed in the women's triathlon at the 2024 Summer Olympics in Paris, France.

== Personal life ==
Périault grew up in Vélizy, Yvelines, France. She enjoyed swimming and mountain biking as a child and says she took part in her first triathlon when she was 8 years old.
