= 2013 in triathlon =

This topic reveals just the World Triathlon Series events and their results for 2013.

- April 6 – September 15: 2013 ITU World Triathlon Series; ends with the Grand Final in London
  - April 6 & 7 at (New Zealand) Auckland
    - Men's Winner: (Spain) Javier Gómez.
    - Women's Winner: (Germany) Anne Haug.
  - April 18 – 20 at (United States) San Diego
    - Men's winner: (United Kingdom) Alistair Brownlee.
    - Women's winner: (United States) Gwen Jorgensen.
  - May 11 & 12 at (Japan) Yokohama
    - Men's winner: (United Kingdom) Jonathan Brownlee.
    - Women's winner: (United States) Gwen Jorgensen.
  - June 1 & 2 at (Spain) Madrid
    - Men's winner: (United Kingdom) Jonathan Brownlee.
    - Women's winner: (United Kingdom) Non Stanford.
  - July 6 at (Austria) Kitzbühel
    - Men's winner: (United Kingdom) Alistair Brownlee.
    - Women's winner: (United Kingdom) Jodie Stimpson.
  - July 20 & 21 at (Germany) Hamburg
    - Men's winner: (United Kingdom) Jonathan Brownlee.
    - Women's winner: (Germany) Anne Haug.
  - August 24 & 25 at (Sweden) Stockholm
    - Men's winner: (United Kingdom) Alistair Brownlee.
    - Women's winner: (United States) Gwen Jorgensen.
  - September 11 – 15 at (United Kingdom) London (Grand Final)
    - Men's winner: (Spain) Javier Gómez.
    - Women's winner: (United Kingdom) Non Stanford.
