= World Triathlon Sprint Distance Championships =

Triathlon competition

The World Triathlon Sprint Championships is a triathlon competition covering distances of 750 m swim, 20 km bicycle and 5 km run and is organised by the World Triathlon. The inaugural championships took place in 2010. In 2011 the championship was held as an event as part of the 2011 ITU World Championship Series. Great Britain's Jonathan Brownlee was the male champion in both editions, while Swede Lisa Norden and Chilean Barbara Riveros Diaz won the first two women's championships. However, for every year after 2011 multiple sprint events were held as part of the World Triathlon Series with no delineation made between them, and so no title was awarded at sprint distances at the elite level.

In 2021 Bermuda, as one leg of the World Triathlon Championship Series was selected to host a combined World Triathlon Sprint & Relay Championships, also incorporating the World Triathlon Mixed Relay Championships, and reintroducing a sprint championship in a new multi-race 'Eliminator' format, but the event was cancelled following COVID-19 restrictions. The combined event took place the following year in Montréal, Canada on 25 June 2022.

The Championships' eliminator format included multiple races of a super-sprint distance (300 m swim, 5 km bike and 2.5 km run) over several days of racing. Athletes begin by competing in super-sprint qualifiers with the top 10 finishers in each of two heats proceeding to the final. For those outside the top 10, a final repechages is held, where they compete again, with the top 10 again reaching the final for a final field of thirty. In the final, the eliminators adopt a 'Devil' format (from 'devil take the hindmost'). 30 athletes compete in the first super sprint, with the last ten eliminated; thirty minutes later a further super-sprint eliminates a further ten from the smaller field of twenty before the final super-sprint race of ten athletes is held to decide the World sprint title. Each elimination race lasts around 20 to 25 minutes, as compared to the hour for 'sprint' distance and 1 he 30 to 2 hour time frame of standard distance triathlon. The final day event therefore lasts approximately two and a half hours, but consists of multiple shorter, more intense races in which transition is unusually important.

The first eliminator format World Sprint champions in 2022 both represented Great Britain, Alex Yee in the male event, and Georgia Taylor-Brown in the women's equivalent.

Jonathan Brownlee is the only two time Sprint distance world champion.

The event went on haitus for a second time in 2025, and has not been held since.

== Medalists ==
=== Men's championship ===
Year	Gold	Silver	Bronze
2010	Jonathan Brownlee; Great Britain	Tim Don; Great Britain	David Hauss; France
2011	Jonathan Brownlee; Great Britain	Javier Gómez; Spain	Alistair Brownlee; Great Britain
on hiatus 2012-2021
2022	Alex Yee; Great Britain	Hayden Wilde; New Zealand	Léo Bergère; France
2023	Hayden Wilde; New Zealand	Vasco Vilaça; Portugal	Alex Yee; Great Britain
2024	cancelled due to course conditions		
on hiatus 2025-2026

=== Women's championship ===
Year	Gold	Silver	Bronze
2010	Lisa Nordén; Sweden	Emma Moffatt; Australia	Daniela Ryf; Switzerland
2011	Barbara Riveros Diaz; Chile	Emma Jackson; Australia	Andrea Hewitt; New Zealand
on hiatus 2012-2021
2022	Georgia Taylor-Brown; Great Britain	Cassandre Beaugrand; France	Beth Potter; Great Britain
2023	Cassandre Beaugrand; France	Beth Potter; Great Britain	Laura Lindemann; Germany
2024	cancelled due to course conditions		
on hiatus 2025-2026

== Venues ==
Year	Date	Location
2010	21 August	(Switzerland) Lausanne
2011	20 August	(Switzerland) Lausanne
on hiatus - 2012-2021
2022	25 June	(Canada) Montreal
2023	15 July	(Germany) Hamburg
2024	cancelled	
on hiatus - 2025-2026
