= 2011 ITU Team Triathlon World Championships =

The 2011 ITU Triathlon Team World Cup was held in Lausanne, Switzerland on 21 August 2011. The championship was the sixth edition to be held and the third since the championships were reformatted in 2009; eliminating the separate male and female teams, running the championships with coed teams.

== Format ==
Each team was allowed to enter 2 teams of four, made up of 2 females and 2 males. The teams competed in the following order of female–male–female–male. Each athlete completed a 265-metre swim, a 5 kilometre bike ride and a 1.2 kilometre run. Due to safety reasons the first athlete completed a longer, 500 metre swim instead.

== Results ==
Since the reformatted event began, Switzerland came into the competition winning both previous championships. In 2011, they settled with the silver medal as Great Britain's team of 2008 World Champion Helen Jenkins, 2010 and 2011 World Sprint Champion Jonathan Brownlee, Jodie Stimpson and 2009 World Champion Alistair Brownlee took the title.

Rank	Team	Time
Gold medal	Great Britain	1:09:29
Silver medal	Switzerland	1:09:44
Bronze medal	Germany	1:09:56
4	France	1:10:08
5	United States	1:11:32
6	Australia	1:11:43
7	Netherlands	1:11:44
8	Hungary	1:12:00
9	New Zealand	1:12:11
10	Russia	1:12:16
