= 2013 ITU World Triathlon Series =

- League: ITU World Triathlon Series
- Sport: Triathlon

Men's Series
- Series Champion: Javier Gómez (ESP)
- Points: 4220

Women's Series
- Series Champion: Non Stanford (GBR)
- Points: 4220

World Triathlon Series seasons
- 2012 2014

The 2013 ITU World Triathlon Series was a series of eight World Championship Triathlon events that led up to a Grand Final held in London in September 2013. The Series was organised under the auspices of the world governing body of triathlon, the International Triathlon Union (ITU).

The World Triathlon Series (WTS) visited Auckland, San Diego, Madrid, Yokohama, Kitzbühel, Hamburg, Stockholm, and London.

The series included two sprint distance races and six Olympic distance races. The series stop in Hamburg also served as the location for the 2013 ITU Team Triathlon World Championships. The Grand Final in London included the World Championships for Under 23, Junior and Paratriathlon division, which were decided over a single race. Elite level competitors were crowned champions based on the final WTS point standings.

== Calendar ==
The 2013 series visited eight cities around the world.

| Date | Location | Status |
|---|---|---|
| April 6–7 | (New Zealand) Auckland | Event |
| April 19–20 | (United States) San Diego | Event |
| May 11–12 | (Japan) Yokohama | Event |
| June 1–2 | (Spain) Madrid | Event |
| July 6 | (Austria) Kitzbühel | Event |
| July 20–21 | (Germany) Hamburg | Sprint Distance |
| August 24–25 | (Sweden) Stockholm | Event |
| September 14–15 | (United Kingdom) London | Grand Final |

== Results ==
=== Medal summary ===
==== Men ====
| Event | Gold | Silver | Bronze |
|---|---|---|---|
| Auckland | Javier Gómez (ESP) | Mario Mola (ESP) | João Silva (POR) |
| San Diego | Alistair Brownlee (GBR) | Richard Murray (RSA) | João Silva (POR) |
| Yokohama | Jonathan Brownlee (GBR) | Javier Gómez (ESP) | João Silva (POR) |
| Madrid | Jonathan Brownlee (GBR) | Javier Gómez (ESP) | Ivan Vasiliev (RUS) |
| Kitzbühel | Alistair Brownlee (GBR) | Mario Mola (ESP) | Sven Riederer (SUI) |
| Hamburg | Jonathan Brownlee (GBR) | Alistair Brownlee (GBR) | Javier Gómez (ESP) |
| Stockholm | Alistair Brownlee (GBR) | Javier Gómez (ESP) | Jonathan Brownlee (GBR) |
| London | Javier Gómez (ESP) | Jonathan Brownlee (GBR) | Mario Mola (ESP) |

==== Women ====
| Event | Gold | Silver | Bronze |
|---|---|---|---|
| Auckland | Anne Haug (GER) | Maaike Caelers (NED) | Felicity Abram (AUS) |
| San Diego | Gwen Jorgensen (USA) | Non Stanford (GBR) | Emma Moffatt (AUS) |
| Yokohama | Gwen Jorgensen (USA) | Emma Moffatt (AUS) | Jodie Stimpson (GBR) |
| Madrid | Non Stanford (GBR) | Anne Haug (GER) | Jodie Stimpson (GBR) |
| Kitzbühel | Jodie Stimpson (GBR) | Emma Jackson (AUS) | Anne Haug (GER) |
| Hamburg | Anne Haug (GER) | Non Stanford (GBR) | Jodie Stimpson (GBR) |
| Stockholm | Gwen Jorgensen (USA) | Non Stanford (GBR) | Anne Haug (GER) |
| London | Non Stanford (GBR) | Aileen Reid (IRL) | Emma Moffatt (AUS) |

== Overall ==
Overall rankings after all 8 events

=== Men ===
| Rank | Athlete | Points |
|---|---|---|
| Gold medal | Javier Gómez (ESP) | 4220 |
| Silver medal | Jonathan Brownlee (GBR) | 4195 |
| Bronze medal | Mario Mola (ESP) | 3726 |
| 4 | Alistair Brownlee (GBR) | 3140 |
| 5 | Richard Murray (RSA) | 2937 |
| 6 | João Silva (POR) | 2795 |
| 7 | Laurent Vidal (FRA) | 2680 |
| 8 | Sven Riederer (SUI) | 2494 |
| 9 | Dmitry Polyanski (RUS) | 2407 |
| 10 | Vincent Luis (FRA) | 2243 |

=== Women ===
| Rank | Athlete | Points |
|---|---|---|
| Gold medal | Non Stanford (GBR) | 4220 |
| Silver medal | Jodie Stimpson (GBR) | 3805 |
| Bronze medal | Anne Haug (GER) | 3110 |
| 4 | Gwen Jorgensen (USA) | 3033 |
| 5 | Andrea Hewitt (NZL) | 3004 |
| 6 | Emma Moffatt (AUS) | 2906 |
| 7 | Ashleigh Gentle (AUS) | 2720 |
| 8 | Aileen Reid (IRL) | 2681 |
| 9 | Sarah Groff (USA) | 2295 |
| 10 | Alice Betto (ITA) | 2270 |
