= Geoff Abram =

Australian rugby union player (born 1986)

- Born: 16 August 1986 (age 40) Brisbane, QLD, Australia
- Height: 181 cm (5 ft 11 in)
- Weight: 100 kg (220 lb)
- School: Brisbane Boys' College

Rugby union career
- Position: Hooker
Super Rugby
Years	Team	Apps	(Points)
2007	Reds	2	(0)

Geoff Abram (born 16 August 1986) is an Australian former professional rugby union player.

Abram is the son of Wallabies prop Bill Abram and twin brother of triathlete Felicity Abram.

Primarily a hooker, Abram was an Australian under-19s and under-21s representative player. He got signed by the Queensland Reds from Wests on a rookie contract in 2005, then during the 2007 Super 14 season featured twice off the bench in back to back matches in South Africa, as a reserve back-rower against the Stormers and Bulls.

== See also ==
- List of Queensland Reds players
