= Mario Mola =

Spanish triathlete (born 1990)

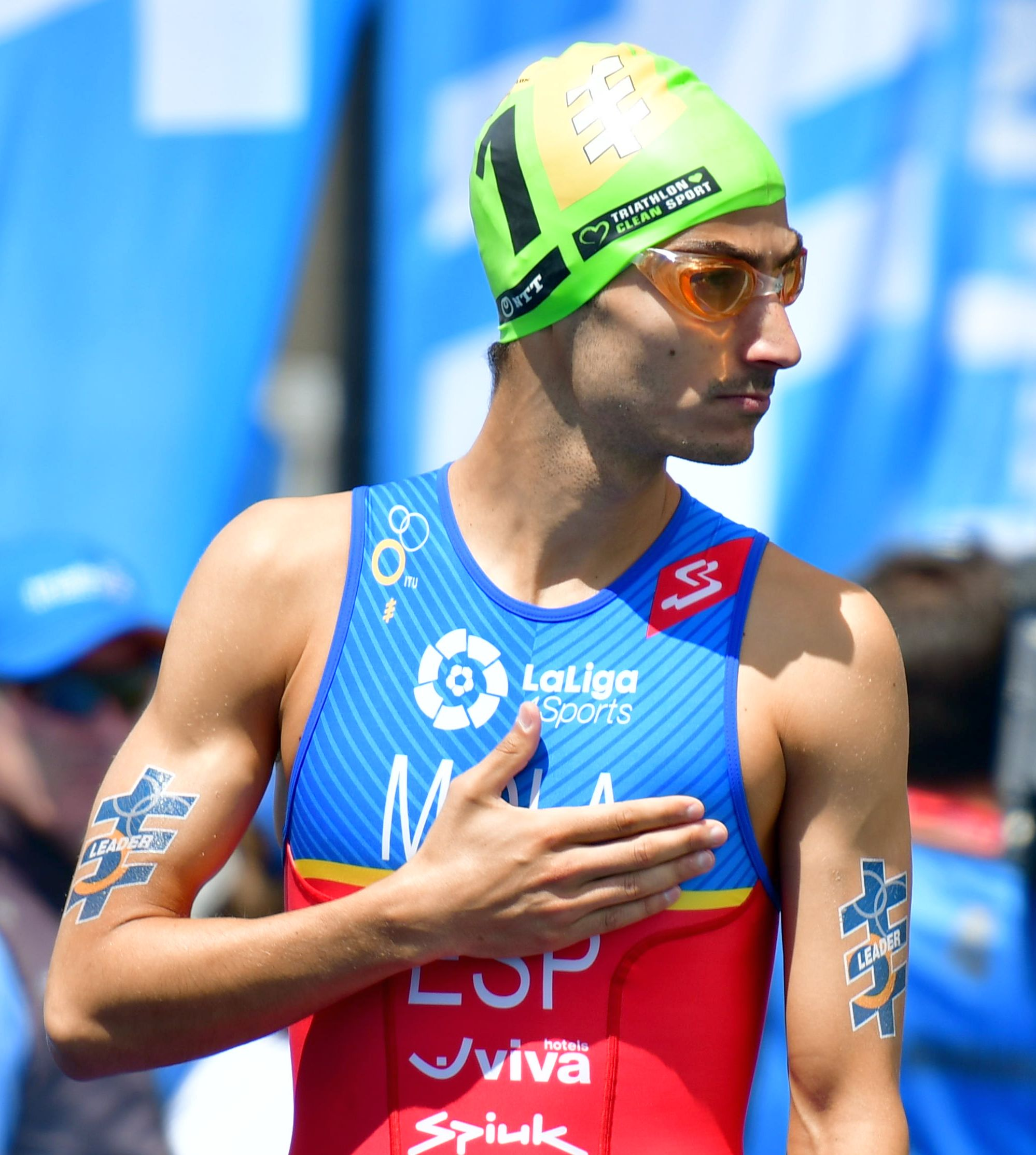
- Mola in 2017.

Personal information
- Full name: Mario Mola Díaz
- Nationality: Spanish
- Born: 23 February 1990 (age 36) Palma de Mallorca, Balearic Islands, Spain
- Height: 1.78 m (5 ft 10 in)
- Weight: 59 kg (130 lb)
- Website: www.mariomola.com

Sport
- Country: Spain
- Sport: Triathlon
Medal record
Men's Triathlon
Representing Spain
ITU World Championships
Gold medal – first place	2016	Elite
Gold medal – first place	2017	Elite
Gold medal – first place	2018	Elite
Silver medal – second place	2014	Elite
Silver medal – second place	2015	Elite
Silver medal – second place	2019	Elite
Bronze medal – third place	2013	Elite
European Triathlon Championships
Bronze medal – third place	2013	Elite
Men's Duathlon
World Triathlon Duathlon Championships
Gold medal – first place	2023	Elite

Mario Mola Díaz (born 23 February 1990 in Palma de Mallorca), is a Spanish professional triathlete. He is the 2016, 2017 and 2018 ITU World Triathlon Series World Champion. He has placed 19th at the London Olympic Games 2012, 8th at the Rio Olympic Games 2016 and 10th at the Tokyo Olympic Games 2020. In addition to his World Triathlon Series wins, he has placed second and third in 2014 and 2015 ITU World Triathlon Series.

== Sports career ==
Mola began swimming at five years old in Palma de Mallorca, where he grew up. But it wasn't before the age of 15 that started riding on a racing bike. Mola started to take part in junior triathlons in 2005. From 2006 on he has been a member of the Spanish National Team. Since 2008 he belongs to the world's best triathlon athletes in the world. In France, he represented ECS Triathlon in the Club Championship Series Grand Prix de Triathlon.

In 2009, Mola became Triathlon Junior World Champion. In France, at the club championship series Grand Prix de Triathlon, Mola competed for the E.C. Sartrouville. In Germany, Mola competed in the first league for the club EJOT Buschütten. In Düsseldorf (8 July 2012) he won the gold medal.

In 2012 he competed in the Olympic Games, placing 19th place in London. In June 2013 he landed in third place at the Olympic distance European Championship.

Mola placed second overall 2014 ITU World Triathlon Series behind fellow Spanish competitor Javier Gomez. In March 2015 he won the starting race of the season in Abu Dhabi. In September in the same year, he also won the last race of the season in Chicago. Again, he placed second overall, behind Javier Gomez in the 2015 ITU World Triathlon Series.

In March 2016, he won the ITU WTS Series race in Abu Dhabi. At the Rio Olympic Games he competed for Spain, placing 8th place.

=== ITU Triathlon world champion ===
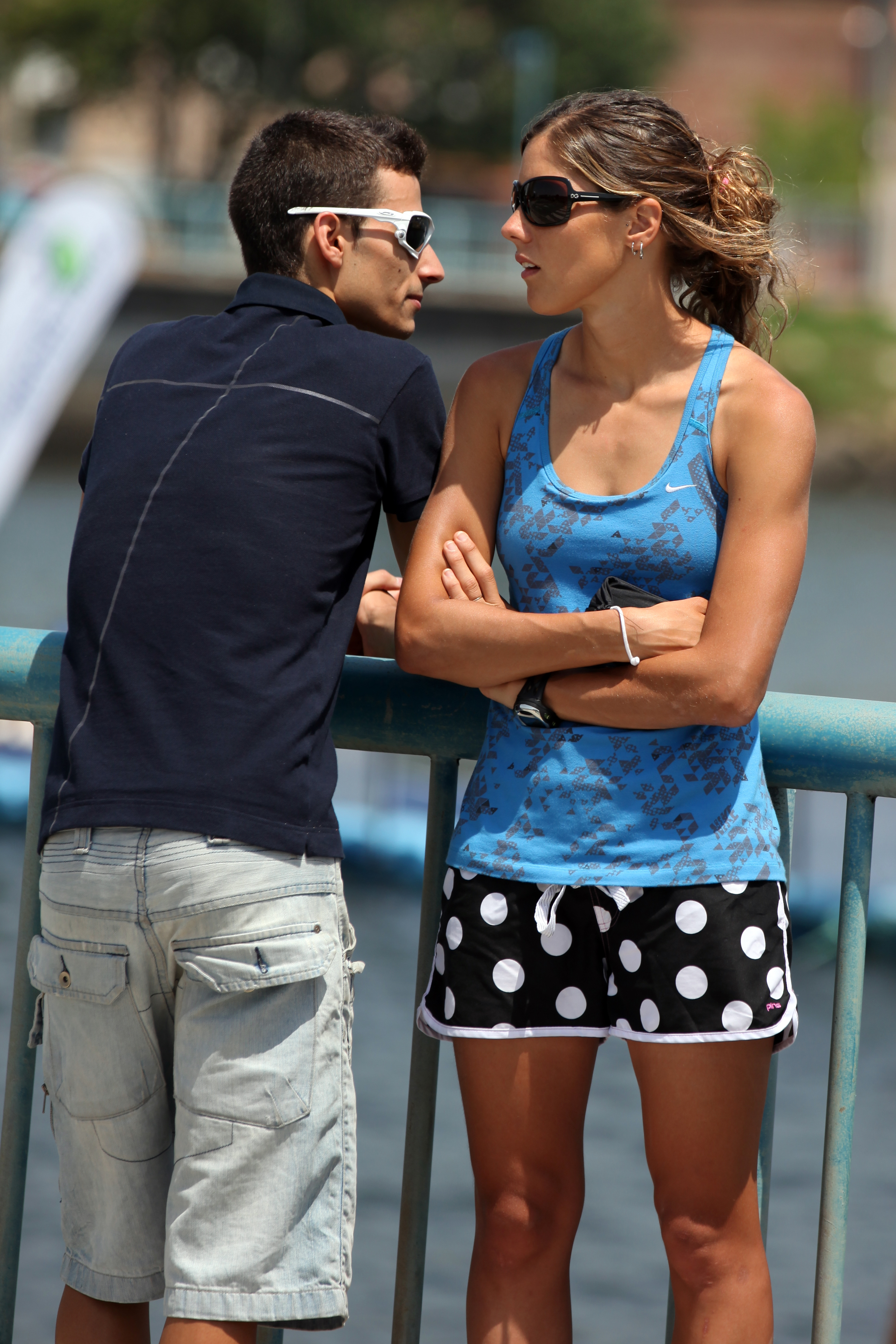
Mola and Carolina Routier at the European Championships in Pontevedra, 2011.

In Mexico at the last race of the 2016 season Mola landed in 5th place and was crowned short distance triathlon world champion. He beat Jonathan Brownlee by 4 points.

In 2017, the 27 year old Mola successfully defended his title with four wins in nine races and repeated as world champion in the 2017 ITU World Triathlon Series. and was nominated ETU athlete of the year 2017. In 2018, at the grand final in Australia, he was crowned world champion for the third time in a row. Additionally, with a total of 197.000 Us-Dollar, Mario Mola was leading the prize money ranking of the season 2018.

Mola is married to the Catalan triathlon athlete Carolina Routier and is studying economics besides his professional career as an athlete.

== ITU results ==
Mola's ITU race results are:

Results list

Date	Competition	Place	Rank
2007-05-19	Duathlon World Championships (Junior)	Győr	6
2007-06-16	Duathlon European Championships (Junior)	Edinburgh	8
2007-06-29	European Championships (Junior)	Copenhagen	DNF
2008-05-10	European Championships (Junior)	Lisbon	16
2008-05-24	Duathlon European Championships (Junior)	Serres	2
2008-09-27	Duathlon World Championships (Junior)	Rimini	5
2009-04-05	European Cup	Quarteira	51
2009-07-02	European Championships (Junior)	Holten	2
2009-08-23	European Cup	Karlovy Vary	33
2009-09-09	World Championship Series (Junior)	Gold Coast	1
2009-09-26	Duathlon World Championships (Junior)	Concord	2
2010-04-11	European Cup	Quarteira	1
2010-06-05	World Championship Series	Madrid	47
2010-06-12	Premium European Cup	Pontevedra	2
2010-07-03	European Championships	Athlone	DNF
2010-07-10	World Cup	Holten	25
2010-07-24	World Championship Series	London	5
2010-08-08	World Cup	Tiszaujvaros	DNF
2010-08-14	World Championship Series	Kitzbuhel	DNF
2010-08-28	European Championships (U23)	Vila Nova de Gaia	12
2010-09-08	U23 World Championship	Budapest	DNF
2011-02-26	Pan American Cup and South American Championships	Salinas	1
2011-04-09	World Championship Series	Sydney	DNF
2011-04-17	World Cup	Ishigaki	13
2011-05-08	World Cup	Monterrey	20
2011-06-04	World Championship Series	Madrid	16
2011-06-18	World Championship Series	Kitzbuhel	11
2011-06-24	European Championships	Pontevedra	4
2011-07-16	World Championship Series	Hamburg	46
2011-07-31	Premium European Cup	Banyoles	9
2011-08-06	World Championship Series	London	DNF
2011-08-20	Sprint World Championship	Lausanne	52
2011-09-09	World Championship Series, Grand Final	Beijing	47
2011-09-19	World Championship Series	Yokohama	DNF
2011-10-09	World Cup	Huatulco	12
2012-03-24	World Cup	Mooloolaba	4
2012-03-31	European Cup	Quarteira	36
2012-04-20	European Championships	Eilat	6
2012-05-10	World Triathlon Series	San Diego	4
2012-05-26	World Triathlon Series	Madrid	9
2012-06-23	World Triathlon Series	Kitzbuhel	35
2012-07-21	World Triathlon Series	Hamburg	DNF
2012-08-04	Olympic Games	London	19
2012-08-25	World Triathlon Series	Stockholm	22
2012-01-09	European Championships (U23)	Aguilas	10
2012-10-20	World Triathlon Series	Auckland	24
2013-03-09	Pan American Cup	Clermont	1
2013-04-06	World Triathlon Series	Auckland	2
2013-04-19	World Triathlon Series	San Diego	5
2013-06-01	World Triathlon Series	Madrid	4
2013-06-14	European Championships	Alanya	3
2013-07-06	World Triathlon Series	Kitzbuehel	2
2013-07-20	World Triathlon Series	Hamburg	5
2013-11-09	World Triathlon Series	London	3
2014-03-15	World Cup	Mooloolaba	1
2014-03-23	World Cup	New Plymouth	1
2014-06-04	World Triathlon Series	Auckland	8
2014-04-26	World Triathlon Series	Cape Town	4
2014-05-17	World Triathlon Series	Yokohama	2
2014-05-31	World Triathlon Series	London	1
2014-06-28	World Triathlon Series	Chicago	3
2014-12-07	World Triathlon Series	Hamburg	9
2014-08-23	World Triathlon Series	Stockholm	4
2014-08-29	World Triathlon Series	Edmonton	2
2015-06-03	World Triathlon Series	Abu Dhabi	1
2015-03-28	World Triathlon Series	Auckland	15
2015-11-04	World Triathlon Series	Gold Coast	2
2015-04-25	World Triathlon Series	Cape Town	8
2015-05-16	World Triathlon Series	Yokohama	3
2015-05-30	World Triathlon Series	London	14
2015-07-18	World Triathlon Series	Hamburg	3
2015-08-02	ITU World Olympic Qualification Event	Rio de Janeiro	7
2015-08-22	World Triathlon Series	Stockholm	12
2015-05-09	World Triathlon Series	Edmonton	3
2015-05-09	World Triathlon Series	Chicago	1
2016-03-05	World Triathlon Series	Abu Dhabi	1
2016-03-12	World Cup	Mooloolaba	1
2016-04-09	World Triathlon Series	Gold Coast	1
2016-04-24	World Triathlon Series	Cape Town	4
2016-05-14	World Triathlon Series	Yokohama	1
2016-07-16	World Triathlon Series	Hamburg	1
2016-08-18	Olympic Games	Rio de Janeiro	8
2016-09-04	World Triathlon Series	Edmonton	2
2016-09-18	ITU World Triathlon Grand Final	Cozumel	5
2017-03-04	World Triathlon Series	Abu Dhabi	8
2017-04-08	World Triathlon Series	Gold Coast	1
2017-05-13	World Triathlon Series	Yokohama	1
2017-07-15	World Triathlon Series	Hamburg	1
2017-07-29	World Triathlon Series	Edmonton	1
2017-08-06	World Triathlon Series	Montréal	14
2017-08-26	World Triathlon Series	Stockholm	7
2017-09-16	ITU World Triathlon Grand Final	Rotterdam	3
2018-03-02	World Triathlon Series	Abu Dhabi	2
2018-04-28	World Triathlon Series	Bermuda	4
2018-05-12	World Triathlon Series	Yokohama	1
2018-06-10	World Triathlon Series	Leeds	2
2018-07-14	World Triathlon Series	Hamburg	1
2018-07-27	World Triathlon Series	Edmonton	1
2018-08-26	World Triathlon Series	Montréal	1
2018-09-16	ITU World Triathlon Grand Final	Gold Coast	2

DNF = did not finish · DNS = did not start · DQ = disqualified
