= 2017 Ironman 70.3 World Championship =

Long distance triathlon competition

Ironman 70.3 World Championship
- Location: Chattanooga, Tennessee
- Date: September 9–10, 2017

Champions
- Men: (Spain) Javier Gomez
- Women: (Switzerland) Daniela Ryf

The 2017 Ironman 70.3 World Championship was a long distance triathlon competition held on September 9–10, 2017 in Chattanooga, Tennessee that was won by Javier Gomez of Spain and Daniela Ryf of Switzerland. The championship was organized by the World Triathlon Corporation (WTC) and it marked the first time the race was held on two separate days, splitting the days of competition between male and female competitors. For Ryf it was her third Ironman 70.3 World Championship win. This was Gomez's second 70.3 championship win having won also in 2014.

== Championship results ==
=== Men ===
Rank	Time (h:mm:ss)	Name	Country	Split times (h:mm:ss / m:ss)				
Rank	Time (h:mm:ss)	Name	Country	Swim	T1	Bike	T2	Run
1	3:49:44	Javier Gomez	Spain	24:08	1:36	2:12:27	1:04	1:10:29
2	3:51:06	Ben Kanute	United States	24:03	1:42	2:08:10	0:48	1:16:23
3	3:51:59	Tim Don	United Kingdom	24:58	1:47	2:11:12	0:58	1:13:04
4	3:53:32	Sam Appleton	Australia	25:01	1:54	2:11:01	1:00	1:14:36
5	3:54:44	Sebastian Kienle	Germany	28:22	1:38	2:07:45	0:57	1:16:02
6	3:55:17	Maurice Clavel	Germany	25:07	1:45	2:11:03	0:49	1:16:33
7	3:56:20	Tyler Butterfield	Bermuda	25:18	1:53	2:10:40	1:03	1:17:26
8	3:56:33	Andreas Dreitz	Germany	26:39	2:17	2:09:16	1:07	1:17:14
9	3:56:53	Ivan Tutukin	Russia	26:24	1:51	2:15:00	0:50	1:12:48
10	3:57:36	Pieter Heemeryck	Belgium	25:27	1:38	2:11:02	1:03	1:18:26

=== Women ===
Rank	Time (h:mm:ss)	Name	Country	Split times (h:mm:ss / m:ss)				
Rank	Time (h:mm:ss)	Name	Country	Swim	T1	Bike	T2	Run
1st place, gold medalist(s)	4:11:59	Daniela Ryf	Switzerland	26:26	2:02	2:20:20	1:06	1:22:05
2nd place, silver medalist(s)	4:18:36	Emma Pallant	United Kingdom	27:53	1:49	2:28:00	1:06	1:19:48
3rd place, bronze medalist(s)	4:19:40	Laura Philipp	Germany	29:47	1:58	2:25:45	0:58	1:21:12
4	4:21:40	Sarah True	United States	25:38	2:05	2:30:16	0:56	1:22:45
5	4:22:12	Helle Frederiksen	Denmark	26:23	2:06	2:29:07	0:55	1:23:41
6	4:24:04	Annabel Luxford	Australia	26:35	2:10	2:28:53	0:48	1:25:38
7	4:25:39	Heather Wurtele	Canada	27:52	2:09	2:27:34	1:04	1:27:00
8	4:26:30	Jeanni Seymour	South Africa	27:40	1:56	2:28:20	0:52	1:27:42
9	4:27:00	Haley Chura	United States	25:35	2:05	2:31:55	1:05	1:26:20
10	4:27:36	Melissa Hauschildt	Australia	30:22	2:06	2:28:22	1:15	1:25:31
