= Carolina Routier =

Spanish triathlete

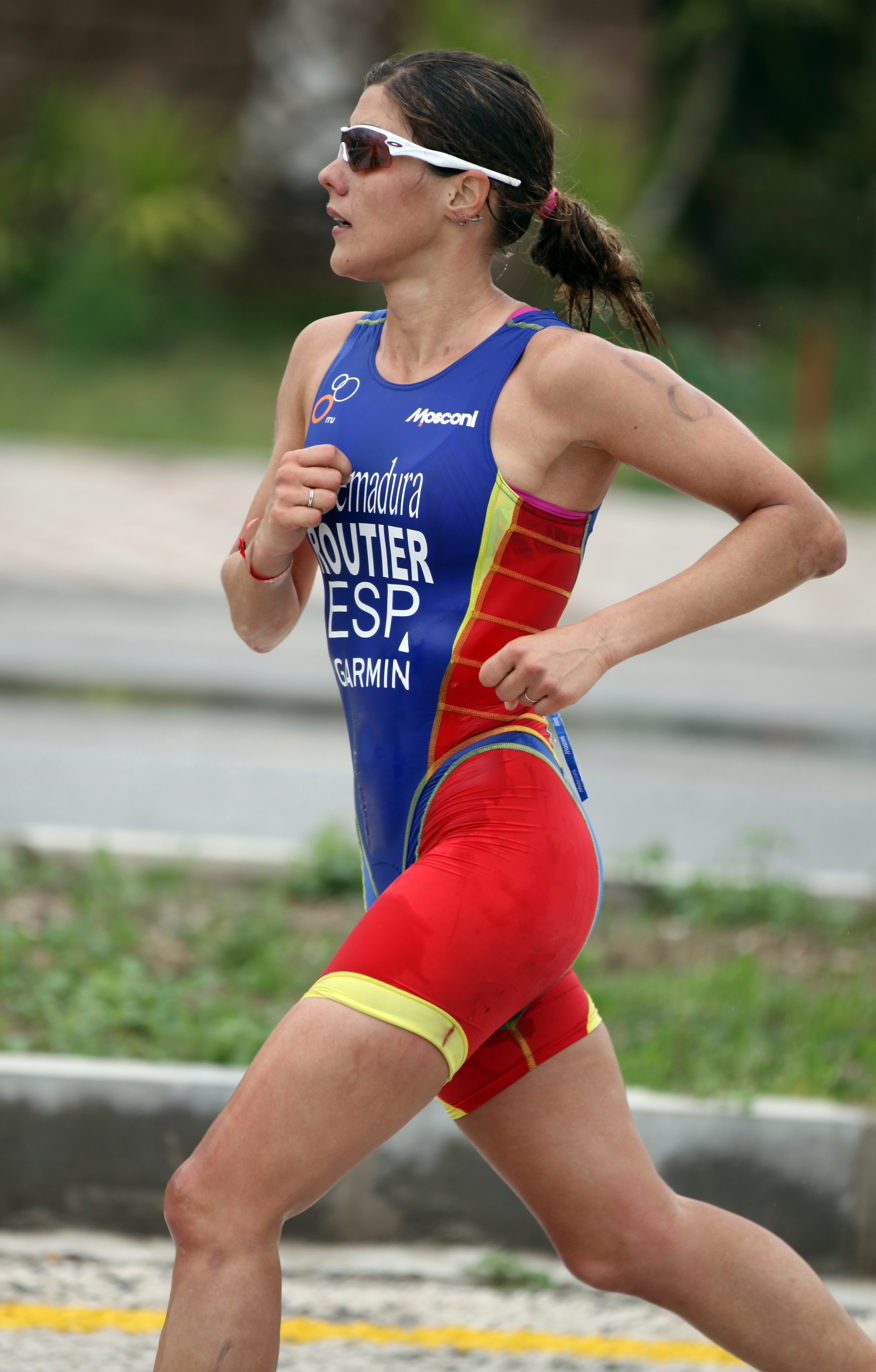
Routier at the European Cup triathlon in Antalya, 2011.

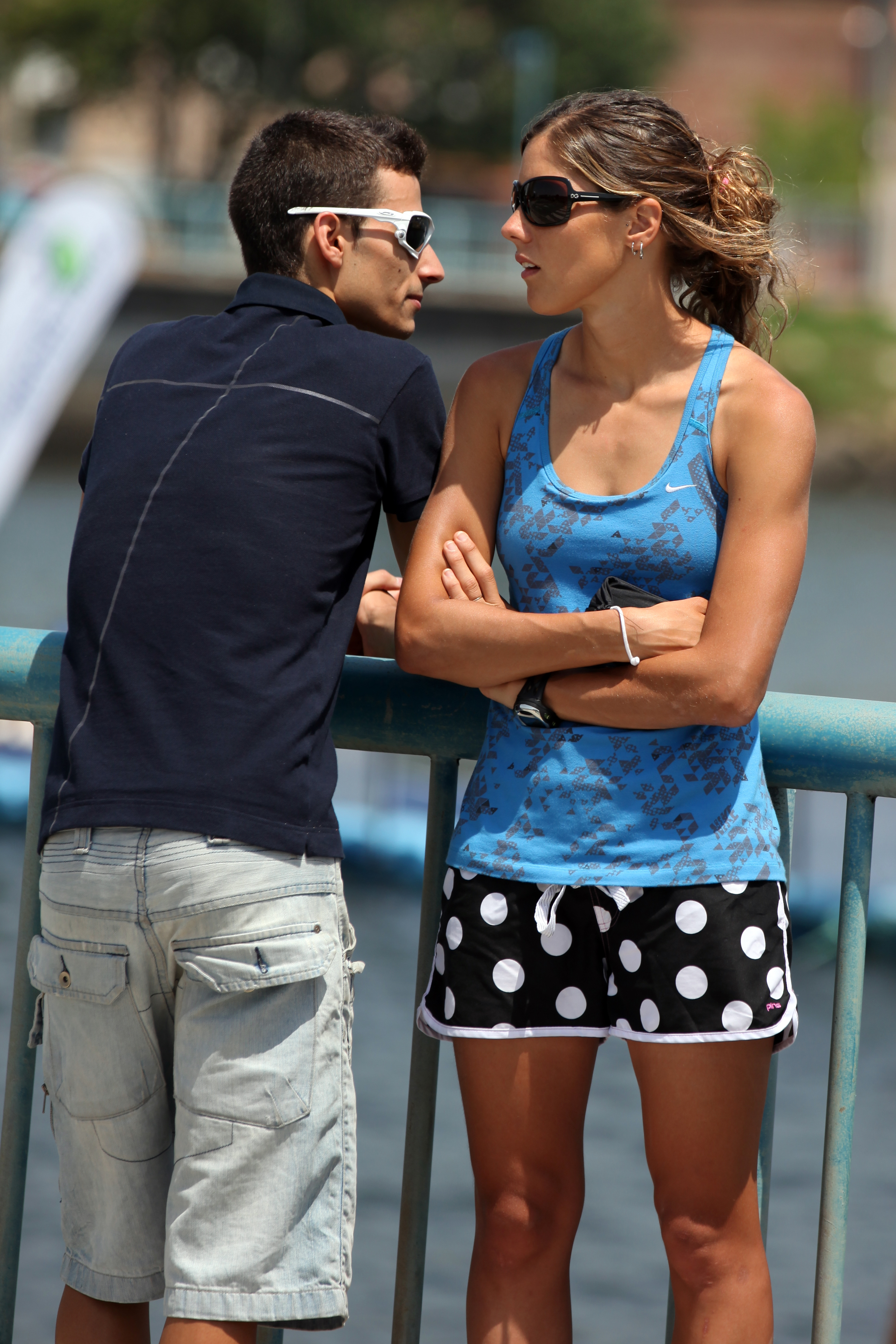
Routier and Mario Mola in Pontevedra, 2011.

Carolina Routier Cañigueral (born 23 April 1990 in Banyoles, Catalonia, Spain), also Caro(l) Routier, is a professional Spanish triathlete, the Spanish U23 Champion (Olympic Distance), Elite Sprint Champion, and the Spanish Aquathlon Champion (U23 and Elite) of the year 2011. Routier is also a member of the National Spanish Lifesaving Team (Selección Española de Salvamento y Socorrismo) and the 2008 European Junior Champion in lifesaving.

Carolina Routier represents the Catalan clubs CN (Club natació) Banyoles, Club Triatló Costa de Barcelona-Maresme, and Triatló Vilanova (Inverse Ditec Triatló Vilanova). In the Circuit Català of the year 2009, she won the silver medal.

Routier studied Advertising and Public Relations at the Faculty of Tourism of the Universitat de Girona, for which she won the silver medal at the Spanish University Triathlon Championships of the year 2010. She later dropped out of the Advertising and Public Relations studies to work towards a Communications degree from the Universitat Oberta de Catalunya.

She lives in the Madrid-based Residencia Joaquín Blume (Spanish Triathlon High Performance Centre).

Carolina Routier's fiancé is the Spanish Olympian triathlete Mario Mola.

== ITU Competitions ==
In 2010 and 2011, Routier took part in 14 ITU events. In 2012, she won the Ibero American Championships in Chile and the Sprint African Cup in Larache. Unless indicated otherwise the following competitions are triathlons and belong to the Elite category. The list is based upon the official ITU rankings and the athlete's ITU Profile Page.

Date	Competition	Place	Rank
2010-04-11	European Cup	Quarteira	33
2010-05-28	FISU 10th World University Triathlon Championships	Valencia	27
2010-06-27	Premium European Cup	Brasschaat	28
2010-08-15	European Cup	Geneva	22
2010-08-28	European Championships (U23)	Vila Nova de Gaia (Porto)	16
2010-09-26	Pan American Cup and Iberoamerican Championships	Guatape	10
2011-02-26	Pan American Cup and South American Championships	Salinas	4
2011-04-03	European Cup	Antalya	19
2011-04-09	European Cup	Quarteira	DNF
2011-05-29	Premium European Cup	Brasschaat	29
2011-06-12	Pan American Cup and Ibero American Championships	Cartagena	DNF
2011-07-31	Premium European Cup	Banyoles	11
2011-08-21	European Cup	Karlovy Vary (Carlsbad)	16
2011-10-09	World Cup	Huatulco	31
2012-01-22	Pan American Cup and Iberoamerican Championships	Viña del Mar	1
2012-03-31	European Cup	Quarteira	25
2012-04-07	Sprint Triathlon African Cup	Larache	1
2012-04-20	European Championships (Mixed Relay)	Eilat	5
2012-04-20	European Championships	Eilat	25
2012-05-26	World Triathlon Series	Madrid	52
2012-06-10	Sprint Triathlon European Cup	Cremona	6
2012-06-17	World Cup	Banyoles	DNF
