= Bill Abram =

Australian rugby union player (born 1957)

- Full name: William Geoffrey Abram
- Born: 28 October 1957 (age 69) Sydney, NSW, Australia
- School: The King's School

Rugby union career
- Position: Prop
International career
Years	Team	Apps	(Points)
1986	Australia		

William Geoffrey Abram (born 28 October 1957) is an Australian former professional rugby union player.

Abram, a Quirindi junior product, boarded at The King's School and was their 1st XV captain in 1975.

A front row forward, Abram toured New Zealand in 1982 with New South Wales. He joined Randwick in 1983 and injured his knee in the final match of the season, which required a full reconstruction. After recovering, Abram ended up at Brisbane club Wests and came into Wallabies contention when he was named in an extended 40-man squad for the 1984 tour of Britain and Ireland, but a neck injury suffered during weight training ended his chances.

Abram won a premiership with Wests in 1985 and the following year was in the team that made the semi-finals of the Toulouse Masters, a world club championship hosted by France.

In 1986, Abram was called up by the Wallabies as a reserve for a Test match against Italy at Ballymore. He didn't get to come on off the bench and missed another opportunity to win a cap when an injured hamstring ruled him out of that year's tour of New Zealand, for which he was due to be selected.

Abram's son Geoff played professional rugby and his daughter Felicity was a world number one ranked triathlete.
