= Daniela Ryf =

Swiss triathlete

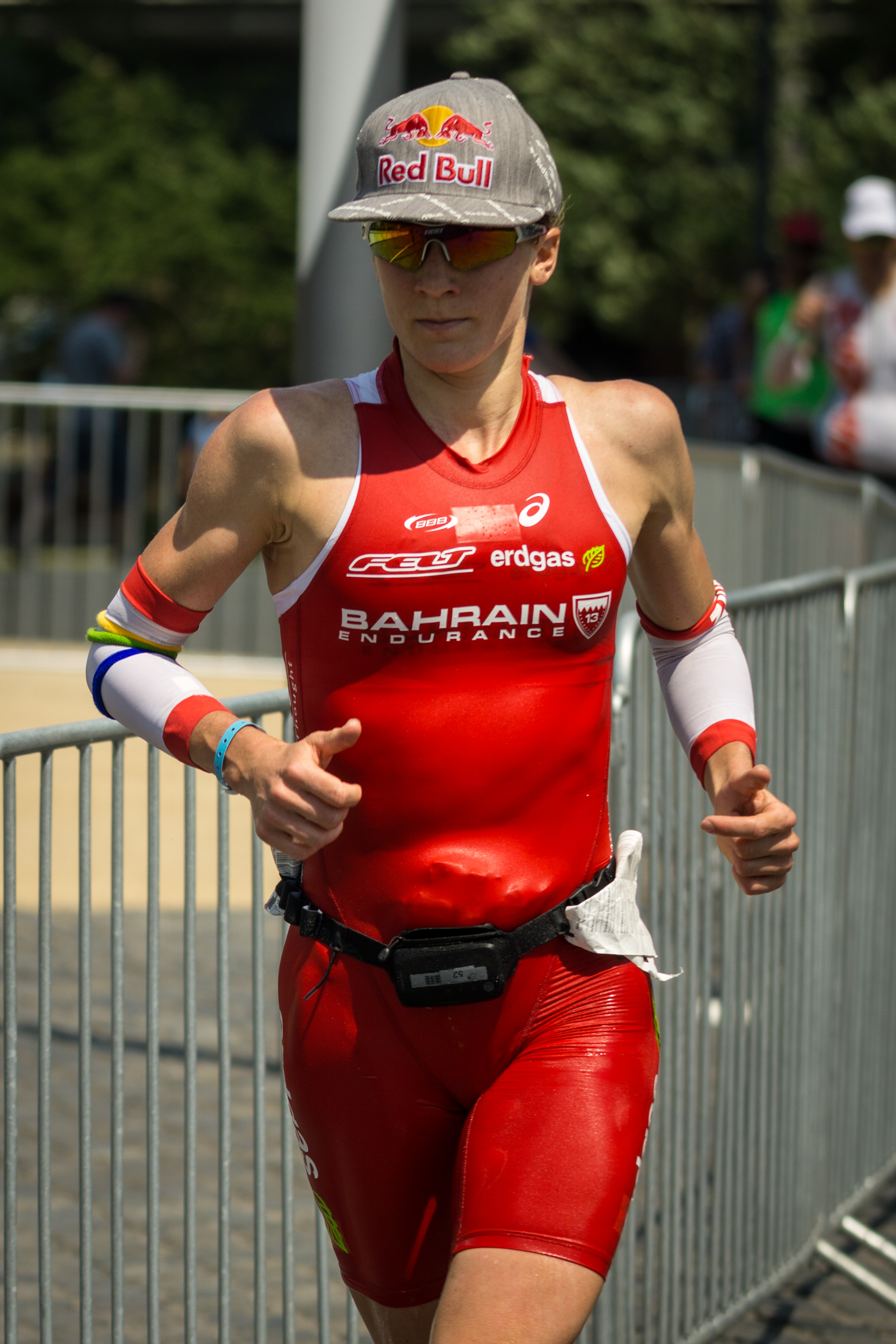
- Daniela Ryf at Ironman Germany in 2015

Personal information
- Nickname: Angry Bird
- Born: 29 May 1987 (age 39) Solothurn
- Height: 1.75 m (5 ft 9 in)
- Weight: 63 kg (139 lb)

Sport
- Country: Switzerland
- Sport: Triathlon
- Turned pro: 2007
- Coached by: Brett Sutton
Medal record
Women's triathlon
Representing Switzerland
Ironman World Championship
Gold medal – first place	2021	Individual
Gold medal – first place	2018	Individual
Gold medal – first place	2017	Individual
Gold medal – first place	2016	Individual
Gold medal – first place	2015	Individual
Silver medal – second place	2014	Individual
Ironman 70.3 World Championship
Gold medal – first place	2019 Nice	Individual
Gold medal – first place	2018 Nelson Mandela Bay	Individual
Gold medal – first place	2017 Chattanooga	Individual
Gold medal – first place	2015 Zell am See	Individual
Gold medal – first place	2014 Mont-Tremblant	Individual
ITU Sprint World Championships
Bronze medal – third place	2010 Lausanne	Individual

Daniela Ryf (born 29 May 1987) is a Swiss triathlete. She is the title holder of the Ironman World Championships of 2015, 2016, 2017, 2018 and 2021; and also title holder of the Ironman 70.3 World Championships of 2014, 2015, 2017, 2018, and 2019.

Ryf competed for Switzerland in the Triathlon at the Summer Olympics of 2008 (7th) and 2012 (40th). In 2010, Ryf placed third in the inaugural 2010 ITU Sprint Distance Triathlon World Championships.

Awards and achievements
Preceded by Dominique Gisin; Wendy Holdener	Swiss Sportswoman of the Year; 2015; 2018	Succeeded by Lara Gut; Mujinga Kambundji
