= 2011 ITU Sprint Distance Triathlon World Championships =

The 2011 ITU Sprint Distance Triathlon World Championships was a triathlon race organised by the International Triathlon Union (ITU) held in Lausanne, Switzerland on August 20. Along with the ITU Team Triathlon World Championships, being held the following day in Lausanne, points earned at the Sprint Distance Championship are incorporated into the 2011 World Championships Series rankings.

The event hosted both elite-level and amateur triathletes. The race is composed of a 750 m swim, 20 km cycle, and 5 km run. A prize purse of $100,000 was awarded for the sprint event. This race marked one of the final races before the 2011 ITU World Championship Grand Final in Beijing, making the points earned at the race crucial.

== Results ==
=== Men ===
| Place | Name | Time |
|---|---|---|
| Gold medal | Jonathan Brownlee (GBR) | 52:23 |
| Silver medal | Javier Gomez (ESP) | 52:27 |
| Bronze medal | Alistair Brownlee (GBR) | 52:38 |
| 4 | David Hauss (FRA) | 52:41 |
| 5 | Alexander Brukhankov (RUS) | 52:42 |
| 6 | Laurent Vidal (FRA) | 52:43 |
| 7 | Jonathan Zipf (GER) | 52:44 |
| 8 | Joao Silva (POR) | 52:52 |
| 9 | Christian Prochnow (GER) | 52:55 |
| 10 | Tony Moulai (FRA) | 53:02 |

=== Women ===
| Place | Name | Time |
|---|---|---|
| Gold medal | Barbara Riveros Diaz (CHI) | 58:35 |
| Silver medal | Emma Jackson (AUS) | 58:35 |
| Bronze medal | Andrea Hewitt (NZL) | 58:37 |
| 4 | Helen Jenkins (GBR) | 58:40 |
| 5 | Ashleigh Gentle (AUS) | 58:42 |
| 6 | Gwen Jorgensen (USA) | 59:02 |
| 7 | Sarah Groff (USA) | 59:06 |
| 8 | Lisa Nordén (SWE) | 59:07 |
| 9 | Emmie Charayron (FRA) | 59:09 |
| 10 | Felicity Abram (AUS) | 59:09 |
