= 2010 ITU Sprint Distance Triathlon World Championships =

The 2010 ITU Sprint Distance Triathlon World Championships was a triathlon race organised by the International Triathlon Union (ITU) in Lausanne, Switzerland on August 21. The event hosted both elite-level and amateur triathletes. This marked the inaugural year for the ITU World Triathlon Series sprint distance championship race, replacing the ITU Triathlon World Cup event that had previously been held in Lausanne. The race included a 750 m swim, 20 km cycle, and 5 km run. A prize purse of $50,000 was awarded for the sprint event.

== Results ==
=== Men ===
| Place | Name | Time |
|---|---|---|
| Gold medal | Jonathan Brownlee (GBR) | 52:58 |
| Silver medal | Tim Don (GBR) | 53:10 |
| Bronze medal | David Hauss (FRA) | 53:16 |
| 4 | Brad Kahlefeldt (AUS) | 53:19 |
| 5 | Dan Wilson (AUS) | 53:25 |
| 6 | Gregor Buchholz (GER) | 53:27 |
| 7 | Bryan Keane (IRL) | 53:33 |
| 8 | Jarrod Shoemaker (USA) | 53:37 |
| 9 | Sven Riederer (SUI) | 53:42 |
| 10 | Franz Loeschke (GER) | 53:44 |

=== Women ===
| Place | Name | Time |
|---|---|---|
| Gold medal | Lisa Nordén (SWE) | 58:02 |
| Silver medal | Emma Moffatt (AUS) | 58:09 |
| Bronze medal | Daniela Ryf (SUI) | 58:51 |
| 4 | Erin Densham (AUS) | 59:09 |
| 5 | Felicity Abram (AUS) | 59:16 |
| 6 | Nicola Spirig (SUI) | 59:24 |
| 7 | Carole Peon (FRA) | 59:31 |
| 8 | Jodie Stimpson (GBR) | 59:35 |
| 9 | Nicky Samuels (NZL) | 59:42 |
| 10 | Anja Dittmer (GER) | 59:45 |
