= Alistair Brownlee =

English triathlete (born 1988)

Alistair Brownlee OBE
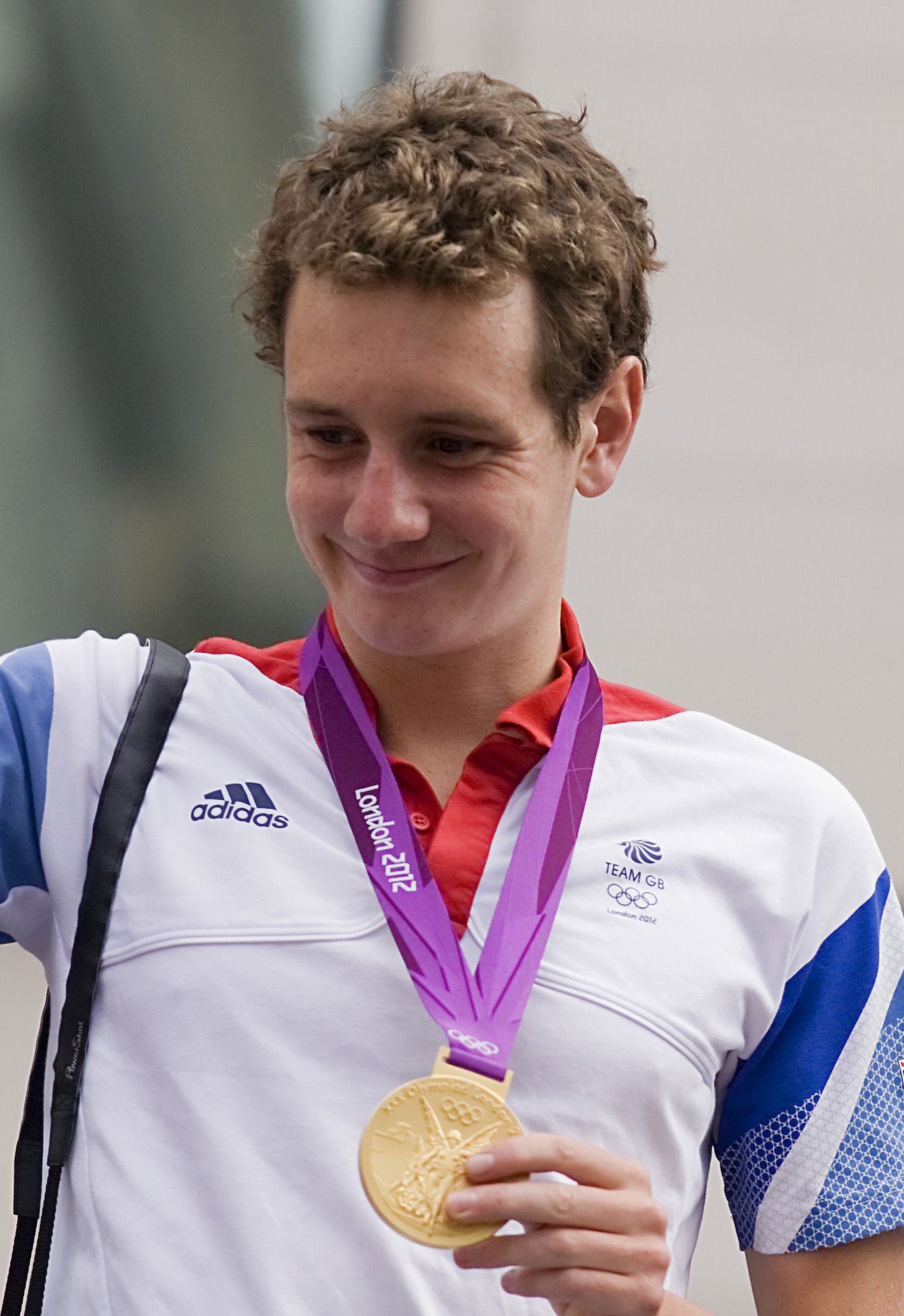
- Brownlee at Our Greatest Team Parade in 2012

Personal information
- Nickname: Al
- Born: 23 April 1988 (age 38) Dewsbury, West Yorkshire, England
- Education: Bradford Grammar School, University of Leeds & Leeds Metropolitan University
- Height: 1.84 m (6 ft 0 in)
- Weight: 70 kg (154 lb)

Sport
- Country: England / Great Britain
- Club: Bingley Harriers; Leeds Metropolitan University
- Team: Corus
- Coached by: Malcolm Brown; Jack Maitland
Medal record
Representing Great Britain
Men's triathlon
Olympic Games
Gold medal – first place	2012 London	Individual
Gold medal – first place	2016 Rio de Janeiro	Individual
ITU Triathlon World Championships
Gold medal – first place	2009 Gold Coast	Individual
Gold medal – first place	2011 Lausanne	Team
Gold medal – first place	2011 Beijing	Individual
Gold medal – first place	2014 Hamburg	Team
Bronze medal – third place	2011 Lausanne	Sprint
Ironman 70.3 World Championship
Silver medal – second place	2019 Nice	Individual
Silver medal – second place	2018 Port Elizabeth	Individual
European Triathlon Championships
Gold medal – first place	2010 Athlone	Individual
Gold medal – first place	2011 Pontevedra	Individual
Gold medal – first place	2014 Kitzbuhel	Individual
Gold medal – first place	2019 Weert	Individual
ITU Triathlon Junior World Championships
Gold medal – first place	2006 Lausanne	Junior
Gold medal – first place	2008 Vancouver	U23
Silver medal – second place	2007 Hamburg	Junior
European Junior Triathlon Championships
Bronze medal – third place	2006 Autun	Junior
Gold medal – first place	2007 Copenhagen	Junior
Men's duathlon
ITU Duathlon World Championships
Silver medal – second place	2006 Corner Brook	Junior
European Duathlon Championships
Bronze medal – third place	2020 Punta Umbria	Elite
Men's aquathlon
ITU Aquathlon World Championships
Gold medal – first place	Cozumel 2016	Individual
Representing England
Men's triathlon
Commonwealth Games
Gold medal – first place	2014 Glasgow	Triathlon
Gold medal – first place	2014 Glasgow	Mixed team relay
Silver medal – second place	2018 Gold Coast	Mixed team relay

Alistair Edward Brownlee (born 23 April 1988) is an English former triathlete. He is the only athlete to hold two Olympic titles in the individual triathlon event, winning gold medals in the 2012 and 2016 Olympic Games. He is also a four-time World Champion in triathlon being Triathlon World Champion twice (2009, 2011) and World Team Champion (2011, 2014) twice, a four-time European Champion (2010, 2011, 2014, 2019), and the 2014 Commonwealth champion. Brownlee is the only male athlete, (and one of the two athletes with Cassandre Beaugrand), to have completed a grand slam of Olympic, World, and continental championships. Brownlee is also a one-time world champion in aquathlon. He is widely regarded as one of the greatest male triathletes ever.

His younger brother Jonathan Brownlee is also a decorated triathlete. Along with long-time Spanish rivals Mario Mola and Javier Gómez, and Frenchman Vincent Luis, the Brownlee brothers were considered the dominant male Olympic distance triathletes of the 2010s, and the Brownlees were particularly dominant in the Olympic triathlon races themselves, winning three gold, one silver and one bronze medal between them.

Brownlee was appointed Member of the Order of the British Empire (MBE) in the 2013 New Year Honours for services to triathlon and Officer of the Order of the British Empire (OBE) in the 2025 Birthday Honours for services to triathlon and to charity.

Brownlee retired from triathlon in November 2024.

== Early life and education ==
Brownlee was educated at Bradford Grammar School, a co-educational independent school in the city of Bradford in Yorkshire. He then started a medicine degree at Girton College, Cambridge, but left after just the first term having decided instead to study Sports Science and Physiology at the University of Leeds, where he gained his degree in 2010. He also completed a MSc in Finance in 2013 at Leeds Metropolitan University.

His father Keith was a runner, while his mother Cathy was a swimmer. The eldest of three boys, he has two younger brothers, Jonathan and Edward (b.1995). His younger brother Jonathan Brownlee is also a triathlete, winning the bronze medal at the 2012 Summer Olympics, the silver medal at the 2016 Summer Olympics, and a gold medal in the mixed relay triathlon at the 2020 Summer Olympics and his youngest brother Edward is also a keen sportsman but prefers rugby and water polo over the triathlon.

Brownlee was introduced to triathlon at a young age by his uncle Simon Hearnshaw, who regularly competed in the sport. As a junior, he was a successful fell and cross country runner, coming second in the Junior English Cross Country Championships and winning the Yorkshire County title on several occasions.

He has said that "It was only when I won the World Junior Championships in 2006 that I made the conscious decision to really focus on triathlon". This was when Brownlee left Cambridge to move back to Yorkshire, focus on triathlon and study at the University of Leeds. He described his decision to leave Cambridge to a student newspaper there in 2013, saying "trying to fit 30+ hours of training around my degree was pretty impossible. I decided that triathlon was my true passion, so I moved back to study at Leeds on a less demanding course, and in a city where the sport was well supported at the time by British Triathlon". He was a member of the triathlon club based at Leeds Metropolitan University's Carnegie High Performance centre, and was coached by Carnegie Director of Sport Malcolm Brown, and in swimming by Jack Maitland.

In 2025 Brownlee received an honorary degree from the University of York.

== Triathlon career ==
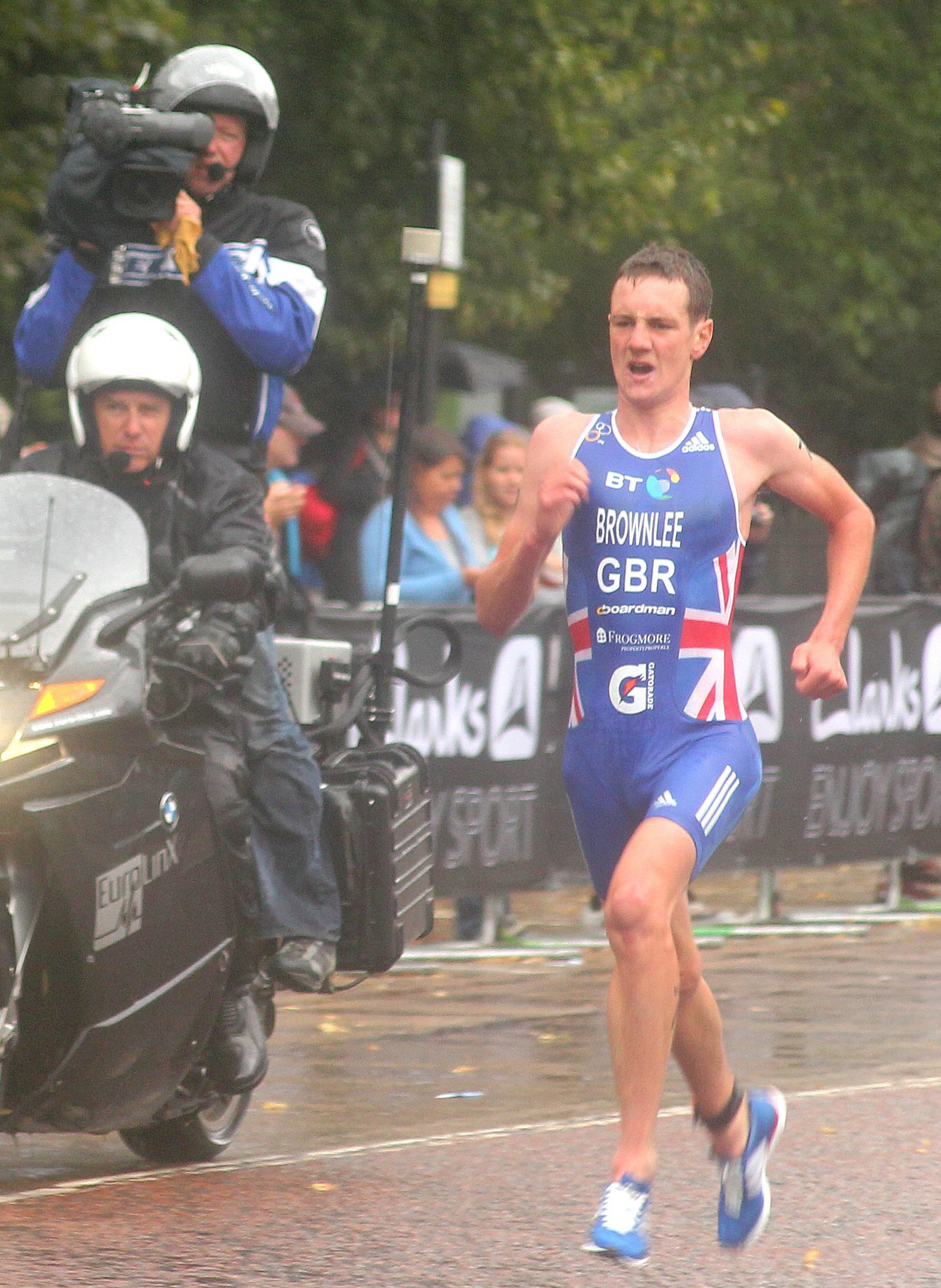
Alistair Brownlee wins the Hyde Park Triathlon, London, August 2011

Brownlee represented Great Britain at the 2008 Summer Olympics in the triathlon event, finishing in 12th place and first British competitor. During the 2008 season, his best world cup finish was 3rd place in Madrid and he also won the under-23 world championship.

He won the 2009 ITU Triathlon World Championship, winning all five of the season's ITU World Championship Series events in which he competed. He was victorious in Madrid, Washington D.C, Kitzbühel and London before winning the 2009 season Grand Final, held on Australia's Gold Coast on 12 September and thereby became the first person to win the ITU world Triathlon titles for Junior Men (2006), Under 23 Men (2008) and Senior Men (2009).

During the 2010 off season, Brownlee sustained a stress fracture of the femur and was not able to return to competition until June, which made defence of his ITU title almost impossible. He did however mark his return to competitive triathlon with a convincing win in Madrid, followed a month later with the European Triathlon Union (ETU) Championships title. Collapsing with exhaustion at the London race in late July, meant that despite winning the final race of the 2010 ITU Series in Budapest, he lost his overall World Championship title to Javier Gómez.

In the April opening event of the 2011 ITU Championship season in Sydney, Brownlee suffered a heavy fall while in the lead which brought early disappointment and a 29th-place finish. This was contrasted with outstanding success when, in the space of just twenty-one days during June 2011, he convincingly won the next two ITU series events (in Madrid and Kitzbühel) and, following a puncture whilst in the lead and having to make up more than 30 seconds on the new leaders, successfully defended his European title at the 2011 Pontevedra ETU Triathlon European Championships and shared the podium with his brother Jonathan, who took the silver medal. Alistair won the 2011 ITU world title, after winning the Grand Final in Beijing and the gold medal at the London 2012 Olympics, while his brother took the bronze medal.

Brownlee won the Commonwealth Games Triathlon in 2014, controlling the race with his brother from the start, before pulling away on the first lap of the run in dominating style; Jonathan took the silver medal. Brownlee also took gold in the mixed triathlon team relay at the 2014 Commonwealth Games, with brother Jonathan, Vicky Holland and Jodie Stimpson.

At the final race of the 2016 World Triathlon Series in Cozumel, Mexico, his brother Jonathan, who had been leading comfortably as they headed into the final kilometre of the 10 km run, began to show the effects of heat and exhaustion, weaving across the course and appearing to be on the verge of collapse. Alistair abandoned his own chance of winning the race, instead opting to assist his brother over the line, finally pushing him to a second-place finish and coming in third himself. The South African Henri Schoeman, who had won bronze behind the Brownlees in Rio, overtook the Brownlee brothers to win the race.

Brownlee made his long-course debut at the half-iron distance Challenge Mogan-Gran Canaria triathlon in April 2017, which he won in a time of 4:03:09, finishing over eight minutes ahead of the runner-up. He took another win the following month when he triumphed in the North American Ironman 70.3 Championships in St. George, Utah, which secured his place in the Ironman 70.3 World Championship in September 2017.

Brownlee placed second at the Ironman 70.3 World Championship in 2018 and 2019.

Brownlee announced his retirement from triathlon on 21 November 2024.

== Titles ==
- Seven time Yorkshire Cross Country Champion (U13–Senior)
- Seven time Yorkshire fellrunning champion
- Five time Chevin Chase winner.
- 2006 Junior European Duathlon Champion
- 2006 Junior World Champion
- 2007 Junior European Champion
- 2007 Junior World Vice-Champion
- 2008 U23 World Champion
- 2009 Hyde Park Triathlon Champion
- 2009 British National Elite Duathlon Champion
- 2009 ITU World Champion
- 2010 ETU European Champion
- 2011 World Team Champion
- 2011 ETU European Champion
- 2011 ITU World Champion
- 2012 World Team Champion
- 2012 Olympic Champion
- 2014 European Champion
- 2014 World Team Champion
- 2014 Commonwealth Games Champion
- 2014 Commonwealth Games Team Gold
- 2016 Olympic Champion
- 2016 Aquathlon Champion

== ITU competitions ==
In the six years from 2005 to 2010, Alistair Brownlee took part in 31 ITU competitions and achieved 24 top ten positions, among which were 13 gold medals, 5 silver medals, and 2 bronze medals.

- 2008, won the U23 World Championship and placed 12th at the Olympic Games in Beijing.
- 2009, won the Dextro Energy World Championship Series placing first in almost all of the circuit's triathlons (i.e. Madrid, Washington DC, Kitzbühel, London, and Gold Coast).
- 2010, opened the season with the European Championship gold medal but subsequently had to put up with a stress fracture of the femur.
- 2011, won the World Championship Series triathlons in Madrid and Kitzbühel, leading the ITU World Championship ranking, and crowned himself again European Elite Champion.

The following list is based upon the official ITU rankings and the ITU Athlete's Profile Page. Unless indicated otherwise, the following events are triathlons (Olympic Distance) and refer to the Elite category.

Date	Competition	Place	Rank
23 July 2005	European Championships (Junior)	Alexandroupoli(s)	19
24 July 2005	European Championships (Junior Relay)	Alexandroupoli(s)	6
10 September 2005	World Championships (Junior)	Gamagori	41
23 June 2006	European Championships (Junior)	Autun	3
8 July 2006	Junior European Cup	Rijeka	1
29 July 2006	Duathlon World Championships (Junior)	Corner Brook	2
2 September 2006	World Championships (Junior)	Lausanne	1
7 October 2006	Duathlon European Championships	Rimini	1
19 May 2007	Duathlon World Championships (Junior)	Győr	2
16 June 2007	Duathlon European Championships (Junior)	Edinburgh	DNS
29 June 2007	European Championships (Junior)	Copenhagen	1
29 July 2007	BG World Cup	Salford	20
30 August 2007	BG World Championships (Junior)	Hamburg	2
7 October 2007	BG World Cup	Rhodes	2
30 March 2008	BG World Cup	Mooloolaba	43
6 April 2008	BG World Cup	New Plymouth	49
10 May 2008	European Championships	Lisbon	15
25 May 2008	BG World Cup	Madrid	3
5 June 2008	BG World Championships (U23)	Vancouver	1
22 June 2008	World Cup	Hy-Vee	7
18 August 2008	Olympic Games	Beijing	12
31 May 2009	Dextro Energy World Championship Series	Madrid	1
21 June 2009	Dextro Energy World Championship Series	Washington DC	1
2 July 2009	ETU European Championships	Holten	2
11 July 2009	Dextro Energy World Championship Series	Kitzbühel	1
15 August 2009	Dextro Energy World Championship Series	London	1
9 September 2009	Dextro Energy World Championship Series, Grand Final	Gold Coast	1
5 June 2010	Dextro Energy World Championship Series	Madrid	1
3 July 2010	ETU European Championships	Athlone	1
24 July 2010	Dextro Energy World Championship Series	London	10
14 August 2010	Dextro Energy World Championship Series	Kitzbühel	40
8 September 2010	Dextro Energy World Championship Series, Grand Final	Budapest	1
9 April 2011	Dextro Energy World Championship Series	Sydney	29
4 June 2011	Dextro Energy World Championship Series	Madrid	1
18 June 2011	Dextro Energy World Championship Series	Kitzbühel	1
24 June 2011	ETU European Championships	Pontevedra	1
7 August 2011	Dextro Energy World Championship Series	London	1
20 August 2011	Dextro Energy Sprint World Championships	Lausanne	1
21 August 2012	ITU Triathlon Mixed Relay World Championships	Lausanne	1
10 September 2011	Dextro Energy World Championship Grand Final	Beijing	1
24 June 2012	ITU World Triathlon Series	Kitzbühel	1
7 August 2012	Olympic Games	London	1
19 April 2013	ITU World Triathlon Series	San Diego	1
6 July 2013	ITU World Triathlon Series	Kitzbühel	1
20 July 2013	ITU World Triathlon Series	Hamburg	2
21 July 2013	ITU Triathlon Mixed Relay World Championships	Hamburg	DNF
24 August 2013	ITU World Triathlon Series	Stockholm	1
11 September 2013	ITU World Triathlon Series Grand Final	London	52
17 May 2014	ITU World Triathlon Series	Yokohama	4
31 May 2014	ITU World Triathlon Series	London	4
20 June 2014	ETU World Triathlon Series	Kitzbühel	1
12 July 2014	ITU World Triathlon Series	Hamburg	1
13 July 2014	ITU Triathlon Mixed Relay World Championships	Hamburg	1
24 July 2014	Commonwealth Games	Glasgow	1
24 July 2014	Commonwealth Games Mixed Relay	Glasgow	1
23 August 2014	ITU World Triathlon Series (Sprint)	Stockholm	2
29 August 2014	ITU World Triathlon Series Grand Final	Edmonton	1
25 April 2015	ITU World Triathlon Series	Cape Town	1
16 May 2015	ITU World Triathlon Series	Yokohama	2
30 May 2015	ITU World Triathlon Series (Sprint)	London	1
2 August 2015	ITU Olympic Qualification Event	Rio de Janeiro	10
9 April 2016	ITU World Triathlon Series	Gold Coast	36
11 June 2016	ITU World Triathlon Series	Leeds	1
2 July 2016	ITU World Triathlon Series	Stockholm	1
18 August 2016	Olympic Games	Rio de Janeiro	1

Key: BG = British Gas (the sponsor); DNF = Did not finish; DNS = Did not start; U23 = Under 23

== French Club Championship Series ==
In 2010, only the femur fracture could slow Brownlee's dominance for some time. At the opening triathlon in Dunkirk (23 May 2010), Alistair was not present, his brother Jonathan won the gold medal. At Beauvais (13 June 2010) Alistair placed 9th. At the Triathlon de Paris (18 July 2010), however, and at Tourangeaux (29 August 2010), Brownlee won the gold medals again. At the Grand Final in La Baule (Triathlon Audencia, 18 September 2010), Alistair placed 2nd, Jonathan 3rd, and their rival Javier Gómez Noya won gold.

In 2011, Brownlee took part in the French Club Championship Series Lyonnaise des Eaux representing the club ECS Triathlon, which, thanks to the Brownlee brothers and Javier Gómez Noya, had already won the Club Championship in 2010. At Nice (24 April 2011), Dunkirk (22 May 2011), and Paris (9 July 2011) Brownlee was the winner.

== Post-Triathlon career ==
After his retirement, Alistair is focusing on health and data research, leading the Terra Research team. He is publishing studies and papers across endurance sports and health data, and his work is covered by the Olympics and Road. In 2026, Brownlee co-authored a study in npj Biological Timing and Sleep that analysed wearable-derived sleep data from 697 people across 49 countries.

== See also ==
- 2012 Summer Olympics and Paralympics gold post boxes
