= Jonny Brownlee =

English triathlete (born 1990)

Jonathan Brownlee MBE
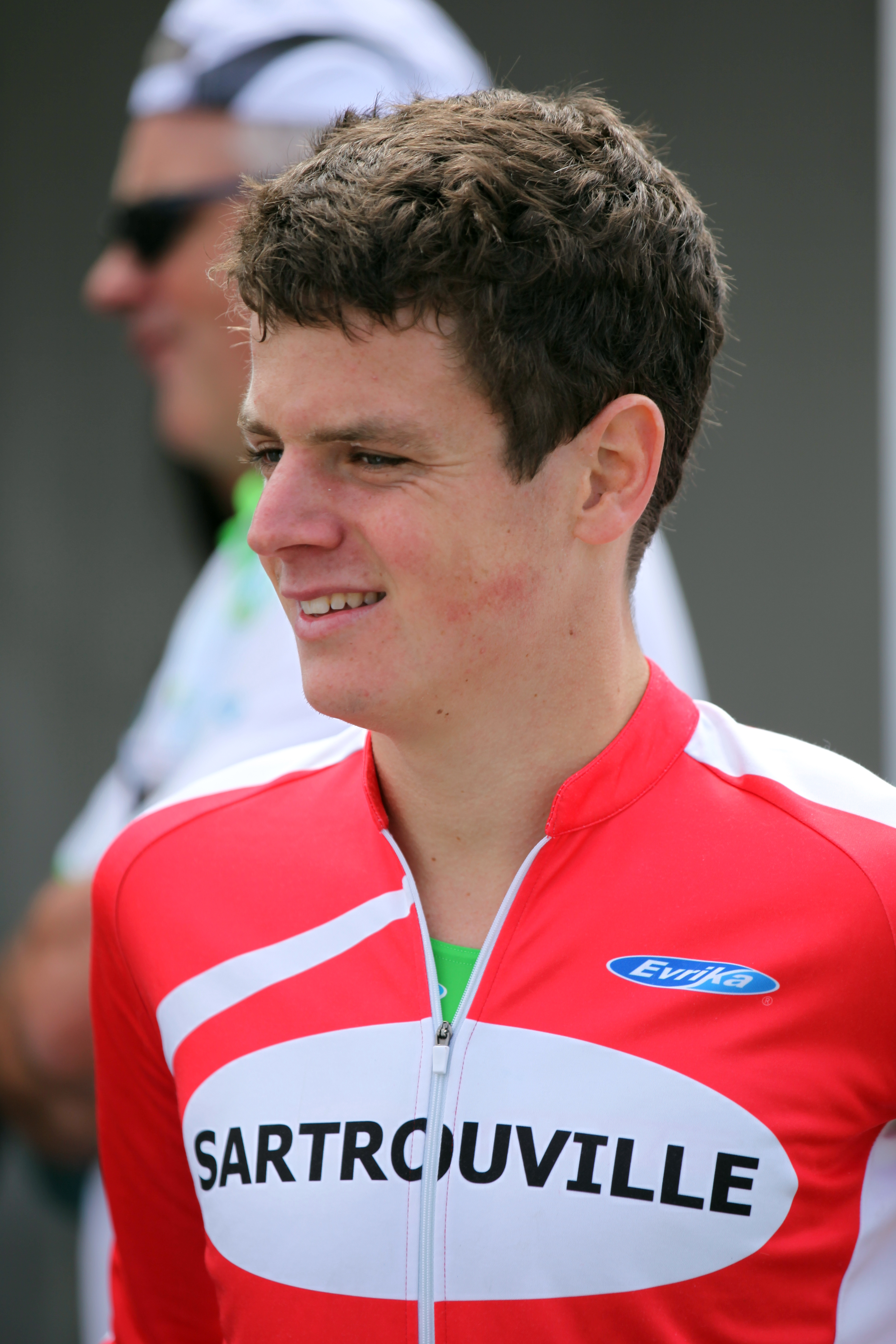
- Brownlee in 2011

Personal information
- Nickname: Jonny
- Born: 30 April 1990 (age 36) Leeds, West Yorkshire, England
- Education: Bradford Grammar School; University of Leeds
- Height: 181 cm (5 ft 11 in)
- Weight: 70 kg (154 lb)
- Spouse: Fiona Brownlee

Sport
- Country: Great Britain
- Sport: Triathlon
- Club: Bingley Harriers; Leeds Metropolitan University
- Coached by: Malcolm Brown; Jack Maitland
Medal record
Men's triathlon
Representing Great Britain
Olympic Games
Gold medal – first place	2020 Tokyo	Mixed relay
Silver medal – second place	2016 Rio de Janeiro	Individual
Bronze medal – third place	2012 London	Individual
ITU Triathlon World Championships
Gold medal – first place	2010 Lausanne	Sprint
Gold medal – first place	2010 Budapest	Under23
Gold medal – first place	2011 Lausanne	Sprint
Gold medal – first place	2011 Lausanne	Team
Gold medal – first place	2012 Auckland	Elite
Gold medal – first place	2012 Stockholm	Team
Gold medal – first place	2014 Hamburg	Team
Silver medal – second place	2011 Beijing	Elite
Silver medal – second place	2013 London	Elite
Silver medal – second place	2016 Cozumel	Elite
Bronze medal – third place	2008 Vancouver	Junior
ETU Triathlon European Championships
Gold medal – first place	2009 Holten	Junior
Silver medal – second place	2010 Porto	U23
Silver medal – second place	2011 Pontevedra	Elite
Bronze medal – third place	2008 Lisbon	Junior
Representing England
Commonwealth Games
Gold medal – first place	2014 Glasgow	Mixed team relay
Silver medal – second place	2014 Glasgow	Triathlon
Silver medal – second place	2018 Gold Coast	Mixed team relay
Representing Great Britain
Super League Triathlon
Silver medal – second place	Jersey 2017	overall
Bronze medal – third place	2021	Championship Series
Bronze medal – third place	2022	Championship Series
Super League Triathlon Races
Silver medal – second place	2022 Neom	Enduro

Jonathan Callum Brownlee (born 30 April 1990) is an English former professional duathlete and triathlete. He is a six-time World champion (once World Triathlon Series, twice World Sprint Triathlon, three-time World Triathlon Mixed Relay), and one-time Olympic champion (mixed relay) in triathlon.

Brownlee was the 2012 Triathlon World Champion, and the silver medallist in 2013 and 2016. Brownlee is also a two-time World Sprint Triathlon Champion when it was held as a separate event between 2010 and 2011. He is the former Under-23 Triathlon World Champion (2010).

He won the bronze medal in the individual triathlon at the London 2012 Olympic Games, the silver medal in the same race at the Rio 2016 Olympic Games and the gold medal in the mixed relay at the 2020 Summer Olympics in Tokyo.

Brownlee also finished the 2021 Super League Triathlon Championship Series in 3rd place, behind fellow Team Relay member Alex Yee and Olympic bronze medallist, Hayden Wilde of New Zealand. He had finished on the podium in 3 of the 4 Championship Series races. In 2022 he also finished in 3rd place overall. He finished in second place at the series finale in NEOM, Saudi Arabia, ahead of overall Champion Hayden Wilde and behind 2nd placed Matthew Hauser. His brother, Alistair Brownlee, is also a triathlon champion, having won the gold medal at both the 2012 and 2016 Olympics.

As of 2021, Jonathan was considered the most decorated triathlete in Olympic history, the only triathlete to achieve 3 Olympic medals, while his brother Alistair, with his two gold medals, is considered the most successful triathlete in Olympic history. Between them, the Brownlee brothers, along with Spanish pair Mario Mola and Javier Gomez, and latterly Frenchman Vincent Luis, were the dominant male 'Olympic' distance triathletes for most of the 2010s. In 2024, Brownlee's countryman Alex Yee surpassed these records when he won the individual race, and bronze in the team relay at the 2024 Summer Olympics to give him 2 golds, a silver and a bronze in Olympic triathlon.

== Biography ==
Brownlee was educated at Bradford Grammar School before attending the University of Leeds, where he studied history. He swam for Aireborough Swimming club and still holds the record for the A&W boys 9/10 yrs 2 lengths backstroke, which was set in 2000. He is a member of the Bingley Harriers and is coached by Malcolm Brown and Jack Maitland at the British Triathlon Federation's High Performance Centre, based at Leeds Metropolitan University's Carnegie Centre. Jonny is the joint record holder (with his brother Alistair) for most wins in the Chevin Chase with 5 wins - Jonny won the Chevin Chase in 2010, 2011, 2012, 2013, and 2016.

His father Keith was a runner, while his mother Cathy was a swimmer. His older brother Alistair Brownlee holds two Olympic titles in the triathlon event (2012, 2016), and is a two-time Triathlon World Champion (2009, 2011). His younger brother Edward is also a keen sportsman, but prefers rugby and water polo over the triathlon.

Brownlee was the British youth champion in both the triathlon and duathlon in 2006 and 2007. In 2008, he won bronze medals at both the ETU European Junior Triathlon Championships and ITU World Junior Championships, and placed 17th in his ITU World Championship Series début event in Kitzbühel. During the 2009 season, he also won gold in the triathlon at the Australian Youth Olympic Festival and competed in two races in the 2009 ITU World Championship Series, finishing 13th in Kitzbühel and 27th in London.

In 2010, Brownlee represented the French club ECS Triathlon and took part in the prestigious French Club Championship Series Lyonnaise des Eaux, also called Grand Prix. In Dunkirk, at the first triathlon of this circuit, he won the gold medal in the individual ranking which helped EC Sartrouville to win the silver medal.

Despite a 15-second penalty, Jonathan took the bronze medal in the Triathlon event at the London 2012 Olympic Games, his brother Alistair taking gold.

He took gold in the mixed triathlon team relay at the 2014 Commonwealth Games, with his brother Alistair, Vicky Holland and Jodie Stimpson.

At the 2020 Summer Olympics in Tokyo, Brownlee took the second-leg of the inaugural triathlon mixed relay, with Jessica Learmonth, Georgia Taylor-Brown and Alex Yee, and took the gold medal in a time of 1:23:41. Brownlee also finished 3rd in the 2021 Super League Triathlon Championship Series.

Brownlee was appointed Member of the Order of the British Empire (MBE) in the 2022 New Year Honours for services to triathlon.

Brownlee announced his retirement from professional sport on 4 September 2026.

== Personal life ==
Brownlee's first son, Freddie, was born in 2025.

== ITU competitions ==
In the five years from 2006 to 2010, Jonathan Brownlee took part in 23 ITU competitions and achieved 14 top ten positions, winning five gold medals.

The following list is based upon the official ITU rankings and the Athlete's Profile Page. Unless indicated otherwise, the following events are triathlons (Olympic Distance) and belong to the Elite category.

Date	Competition	Place	Rank
30 July 2006	European Cup (Junior)	Salford	2nd place, silver medalist(s)
2 September 2006	World Championships (Junior)	Lausanne	DNF
19 May 2007	Duathlon World Championships (Junior)	Győr	9
16 June 2007	Duathlon European Championships (Junior)	Edinburgh	DNS
29 June 2007	European Championships (Junior)	Copenhagen	5
30 August 2007	BG World Championships (Junior)	Hamburg	15
10 May 2008	European Championships (Junior)	Lisbon	3rd place, bronze medalist(s)
5 June 2008	BG World Championships (Junior)	Vancouver	3rd place, bronze medalist(s)
20 July 2008	BG World Cup	Kitzbühel	17
6 September 2008	European Championships (U23)	Pulpí	10
27 September 2008	Duathlon World Championships (Junior)	Rimini	13
14 January 2009	Australian Youth Olympic Festival	Sydney	1st place, gold medalist(s)
20 June 2009	European Cup (Junior)	Tarzo Revine	1st place, gold medalist(s)
2 July 2009	European Championships (Junior)	Holten	1st place, gold medalist(s)
11 July 2009	Dextro Energy World Championship Series	Kitzbühel	13
15 August 2009	Dextro Energy World Championship Series	London	26
9 September 2009	Dextro Energy World Championship Series, Grand Final: World Championships (Junior)	Gold Coast	2nd place, silver medalist(s)
5 June 2010	Dextro Energy World Championship Series	Madrid	28
3 July 2010	European Championships	Athlone	38
25 July 2010	Dextro Energy World Championship Series	London	2nd place, silver medalist(s)
21 August 2010	Sprint World Championships	Lausanne	1st place, gold medalist(s)
28 August 2010	European Championships (U23)	Vila Nova de Gaia (Porto)	2nd place, silver medalist(s)
8 September 2010	Dextro Energy World Championship Series, Grand Final: World Championships (U23)	Budapest	1st place, gold medalist(s)

Key: BG = British Gas (the sponsor); DNF = Did not finish; DNS = Did not start; U23 = Under 23
