= Francisco Javier Gómez Noya =

Spanish triathlete (born 1983)

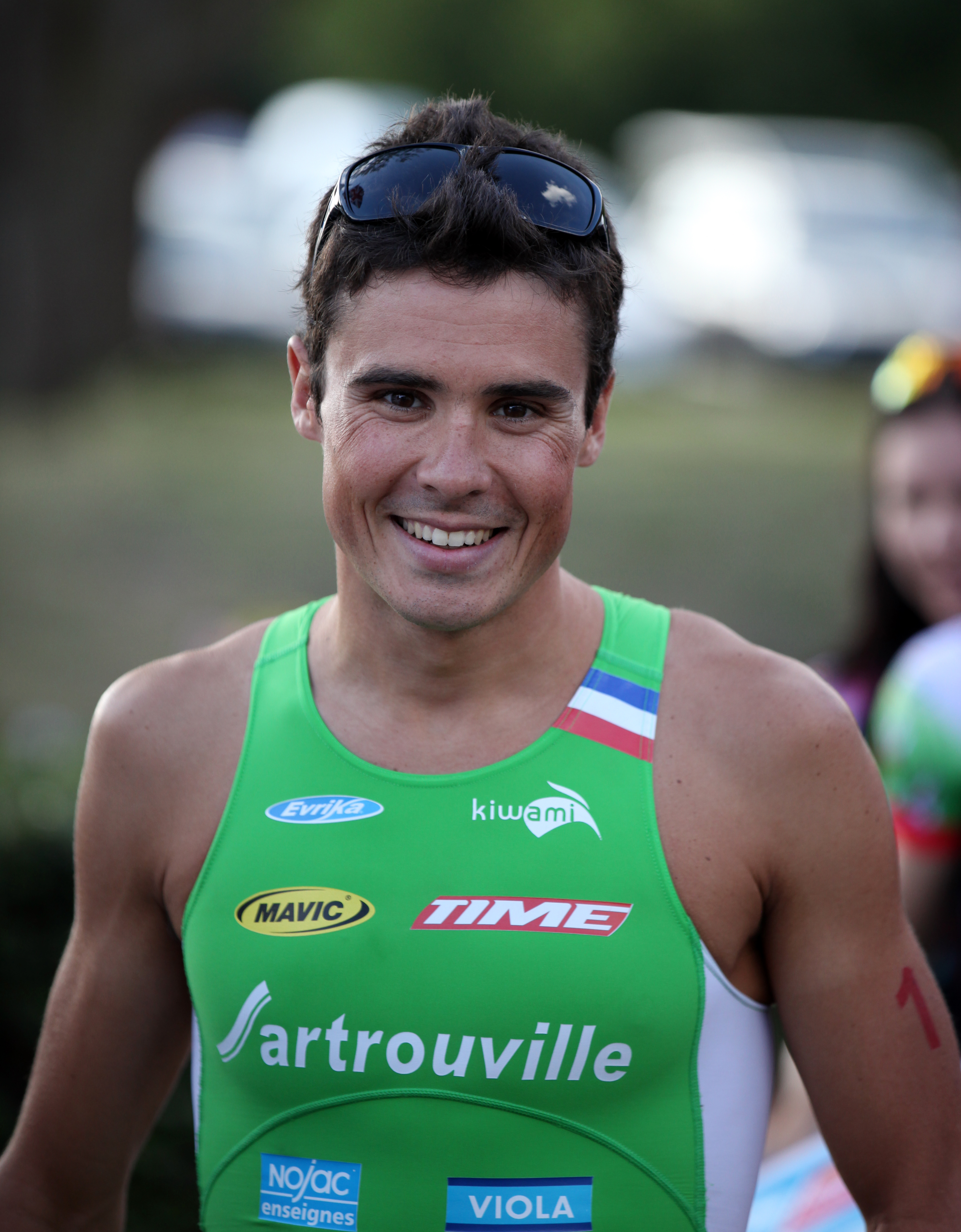
- Javier Gómez at the Grand Prix triathlon in Tours, 2011.

Personal information
- Nationality: Spanish
- Born: 25 March 1983 (age 43) Basel, Switzerland
- Height: 1.78 m (5 ft 10 in)
- Weight: 69 kg (152 lb)
- Website: www.javiergomeznoya.com

Sport
- Country: Spain
- Sport: Triathlon
- Club: Club de Triatlón Cidade de Lugo Fluvial
- Turned pro: 2003
- Coached by: Carlos Prieto López
Medal record
Men's triathlon
Representing Spain
Olympic Games
Silver medal – second place	2012 London	Triathlon
ITU World Championships
Gold medal – first place	2008	Elite
Gold medal – first place	2010	Elite
Gold medal – first place	2013	Elite
Gold medal – first place	2014	Elite
Gold medal – first place	2015	Elite
Silver medal – second place	2007	Elite
Silver medal – second place	2009	Elite
Silver medal – second place	2012	Elite
Silver medal – second place	2017	Elite
Bronze medal – third place	2011	Elite
Bronze medal – third place	2019	Elite
ITU World Cup
Gold medal – first place	2006	Overall
Gold medal – first place	2007	Overall
Gold medal – first place	2008	Overall
ITU Long Distance World Championships
Gold medal – first place	2019	Individual
Ironman 70.3
Gold medal – first place	2014	Individual
Bronze medal – third place	2015	Individual
Gold medal – first place	2017	Individual
Bronze medal – third place	2018	Individual
XTERRA World Championship
Gold medal – first place	2012	World Champion
European Triathlon Championships
Gold medal – first place	2007	Elite
Gold medal – first place	2009	Elite
Silver medal – second place	2010	Elite
Gold medal – first place	2012	Elite
Gold medal – first place	2016	Elite

Francisco Javier Gómez Noya (born 25 March 1983) is a Spanish triathlete. He is the winner of five ITU Triathlon World Championships, he holds three ITU Triathlon World Cup titles, and won the Silver medal for Spain at the 2012 Summer Olympics in men's triathlon. He has also won world titles for Ironman 70.3 and XTERRA Triathlon.

Born to Spanish immigrants (both from Galicia) in Basel, Switzerland, he returned to Spain and now lives in Pontevedra, Galicia.

== Athletic career ==
Gómez took up triathlon at the age of 15 after previously playing football and competing in swimming. However his career suffered a setback in 2000 when a routine medical test by the Consejo Superior de Deportes (CSD) revealed an "abnormal heart valve", leading to a six-year battle between Gómez and the Spanish sporting authorities regarding his right to compete internationally. He initially won this right in November 2003, but he was not selected for the 2004 Summer Olympics and in 2005 the CSD banned him from international and domestic competition until February 2006.

In the nine years from 2002 to 2010, Gómez took part in 57 ITU competitions and achieved 54 top ten positions, among which are 23 first-place finishes. In 2003 and in 2008, Gómez was ITU Triathlon World Champion (both under-23 and Elite categories respectively in 2003). In 2007 and 2009 he was the Elite European Champion. He finished second in the World Championships in 2007 and was the runner up in 2011 ITU Sprint Distance Triathlon World Championships.

At the 2008 Summer Olympics in men's triathlon Gómez was among the pre-race favourites to win. With 300 meters to go in that race, Jan Frodeno was the leader of a group made up of Gómez, Athens 2004 Silver medalist Bevan Docherty of New Zealand, and Sydney 2000 Gold medalist Simon Whitfield of Canada. Whitfield opened up the gap with a sprint with only Frodeno responding. Frodeno sprinted away with 50 meters from the finish to claim the gold medal. Simon Whitfield took the silver medal five seconds behind, and New Zealand's Bevan Docherty won the bronze medal 12 seconds back. Gómez placed 4th, 20.64 seconds behind Frodeno.

In 2010, Gómez was the number one in the World Championship Series ranking, in 2009 he was second, his only rivals being the Brownlee brothers Alistair and Jonathan, with whom he represents ECS Triathlon in the French Club Championship Series Lyonnaise des Eaux. At the 2010 ITU Triathlon World Championship final in Budapest, Gómez came second to British triathlete Alistair Brownlee, but despite the loss in the final, he won the Championship overall.

At the London Summer Olympics in 2012, Gómez took the Silver medal in men's triathlon, 11 seconds behind Gold medalist Alistair Brownlee. Following the Olympic games Gómez won the Hy-Vee Triathlon against a highly competitive field. A month later in his first ever cross triathlon race, he won the 2012 XTERRA World Championship.

In 2013, Gómez continued his success from last year winning the Escape from Alcatraz Triathlon and repeating as the Hy-Vee Triathlon winner. He would then go on to win the 2013 ITU World Triathlon Series, his third such title. With this world championship he joined Peter Robertson as the other triathlete with three titles to his name, and is just shy of Simon Lessing who has four world titles. Later that year Gómez competed in his first middle distance race by taking first at the Challenge Half Barcelona race. In February 2014 he raced and won his second middle distance race, Ironman 70.3 Panama.

In 2014, Gómez won his fourth ITU World Championships, winning four out of the eight possible races as well as placing third at the Grand Final, tying him for all time championships with Simon Lessing. Gómez also won the 2014 Ironman 70.3 World Championship. The next year, Gómez took his third consecutive ITU World Championship, and his fifth title overall, by finishing second at the Triathlon World Series Grand Final in Chicago.

In 2019, Gómez won his first full Ironman distance race at Ironman Malaysia with a course record of 8:18:59. He received a qualification slot to the 2020 Ironman World Championship.

Gómez retired from triathlon at the end of 2024.

=== Results ===
The following list is based upon the official ITU rankings. Unless indicated otherwise, the following events are triathlons (Olympic Distance) and refer to the Elite category.

Results list

Date	Competition	Place	Rank
2002-09-07	European Cup	Madrid	9
2003-07-20	European Cup	Győr	5
2003-09-14	European Cup	Estoril	5
2003-12-06	World Championships (U23)	Queenstown	1
2004-02-28	African Cup	Bloemfontein	1
2004-04-18	European Championships	Valencia	8
2004-05-09	World Championships	Madeira	8
2004-06-12	World Cup	Tongyeong	4
2004-07-25	World Cup	Salford	9
2004-09-19	World Cup	Madrid	6
2005-04-24	World Cup	Mazatlan	DNS
2006-03-03	World Cup	Doha	10
2006-03-10	World Cup	Aqaba	2
2006-04-23	European Cup	Estoril	1
2006-05-07	European Cup	Alexandrupoli(s)	DNF
2006-06-04	World Cup	Madrid	1
2006-06-23	European Championships	Autun	5
2006-07-23	World Cup	Corner Brook	3
2006-09-02	World Championships	Lausanne	10
2006-09-09	World Cup	Hamburg	1
2006-09-24	World Cup	Beijing	2
2006-11-05	World Cup	Cancun	1
2007-03-25	World Cup	Mooloolaba	2
2007-05-06	World Cup	Lisbon	1
2007-06-03	World Cup	Madrid	2
2007-06-17	World Cup	Des Moines	3
2007-06-29	European Championships	Copenhagen	1
2007-07-29	World Cup	Salford	1
2007-08-11	World Cup	Tiszaújváros	1
2007-08-30	World Championships	Hamburg	2
2007-09-15	World Cup	Beijing	1
2008-02-23	African Cup	Bloemfontein	1
2008-03-30	World Cup	Mooloolaba	1
2008-04-06	World Cup	New Plymouth	1
2008-04-19	Premium European Cup	Pontevedra	1
2008-05-10	European Championships	Lisbon	7
2008-05-25	World Cup	Madrid	1
2008-06-05	World Championships	Vancouver	1
2008-07-13	World Cup	Tiszaújváros	1
2008-08-18	Olympic Games	Beijing	4
2009-05-17	Premium European Cup	Pontevedra	2
2009-05-31	World Championship Series	Madrid	3
2009-06-21	World Championship Series	Washington DC	2
2009-06-27	Elite Cup	Hy-Vee	6
2009-07-02	European Championships	Holten	1
2009-07-11	World Championship Series	Kitzbühel	2
2009-08-15	World Championship Series	London	DNF
2009-08-22	World Championship Series	Yokohama	3
2009-09-09	World Championship Series: Grand Final	Gold Coast	2
2010-03-27	World Cup	Mooloolaba	DNS
2010-05-08	World Championship Series	Seoul	12
2010-06-05	World Championship Series	Madrid	4
2010-06-12	Premium European Cup	Pontevedra	1
2010-07-03	European Championships	Athlone	2
2010-07-17	World Championship Series	Hamburg	1
2010-07-24	World Championship Series	London	1
2010-08-14	World Championship Series	Kitzbühel	2
2010-09-08	World Championship Series: Grand Final	Budapest	2
2010-10-10	World Cup	Huatulco	1
2011-03-26	World Cup	Mooloolaba	5
2011-04-09	World Championship Series	Sydney	1
2011-06-04	World Championship Series	Madrid	3
2011-06-24	European Championships	Pontevedra	40
2011-07-16	World Championship Series	Hamburg	6
2011-07-31	Premium European Cup	Banyoles	1
2011-08-06	World Championship Series	London	4
2011-08-20	World Championship Series: Sprint World Championships	Lausanne	2
2012-04-21	European Championships	Eilat	1
2012-08-07	Olympic Games	London	2
2012-28-10	XTERRA World Championship	Maui, Hawai	1
2013-10-06	Half Distance Triathlon European Championship and Challenge Half Barcelona	Barcelona, Spain	1

DNF = Did not finish
DNS = Did not start

== Gallery ==
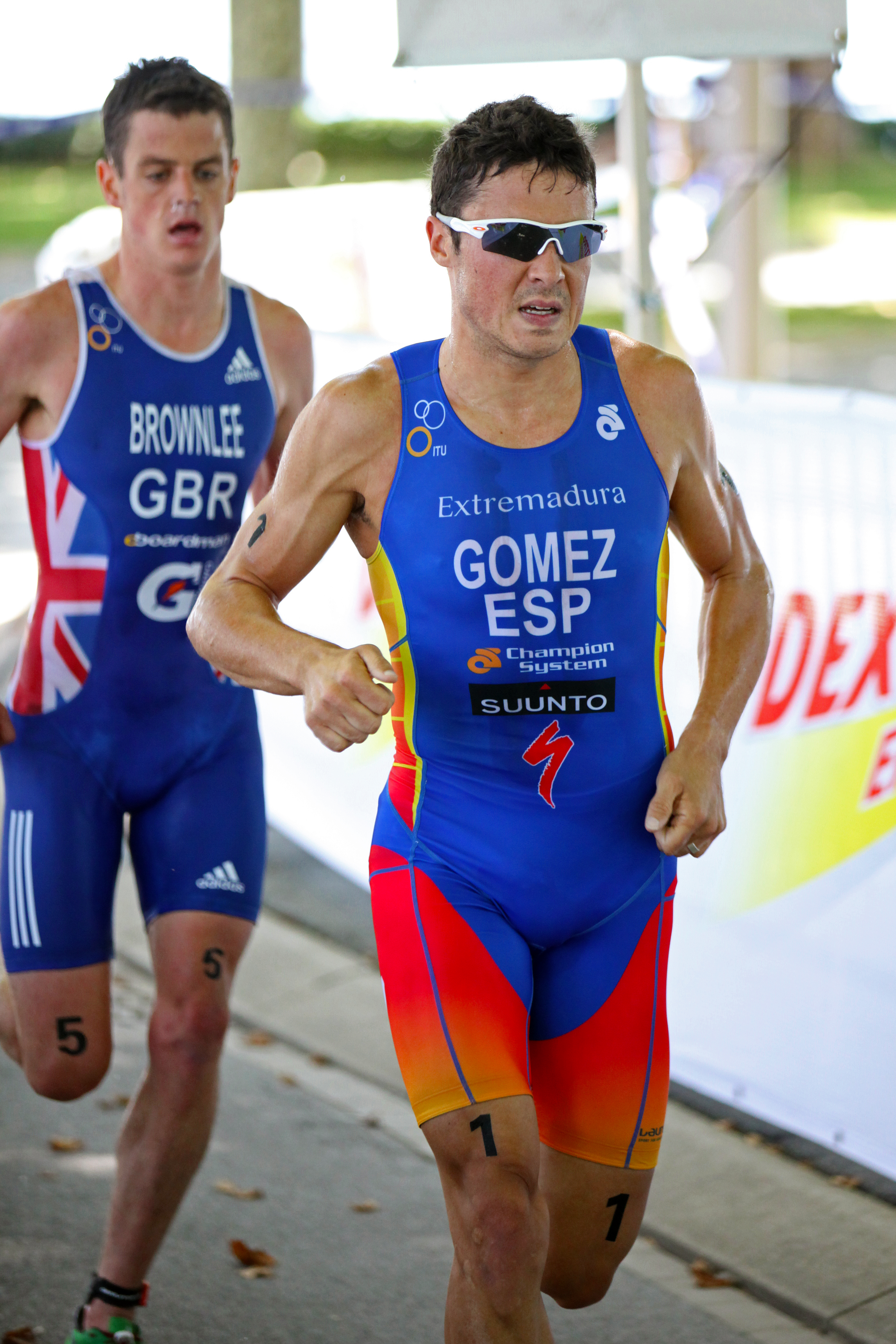
Javier Gómez, followed by the winner Jonathan Brownlee, at the sprint World Championships in Lausanne, 2011.

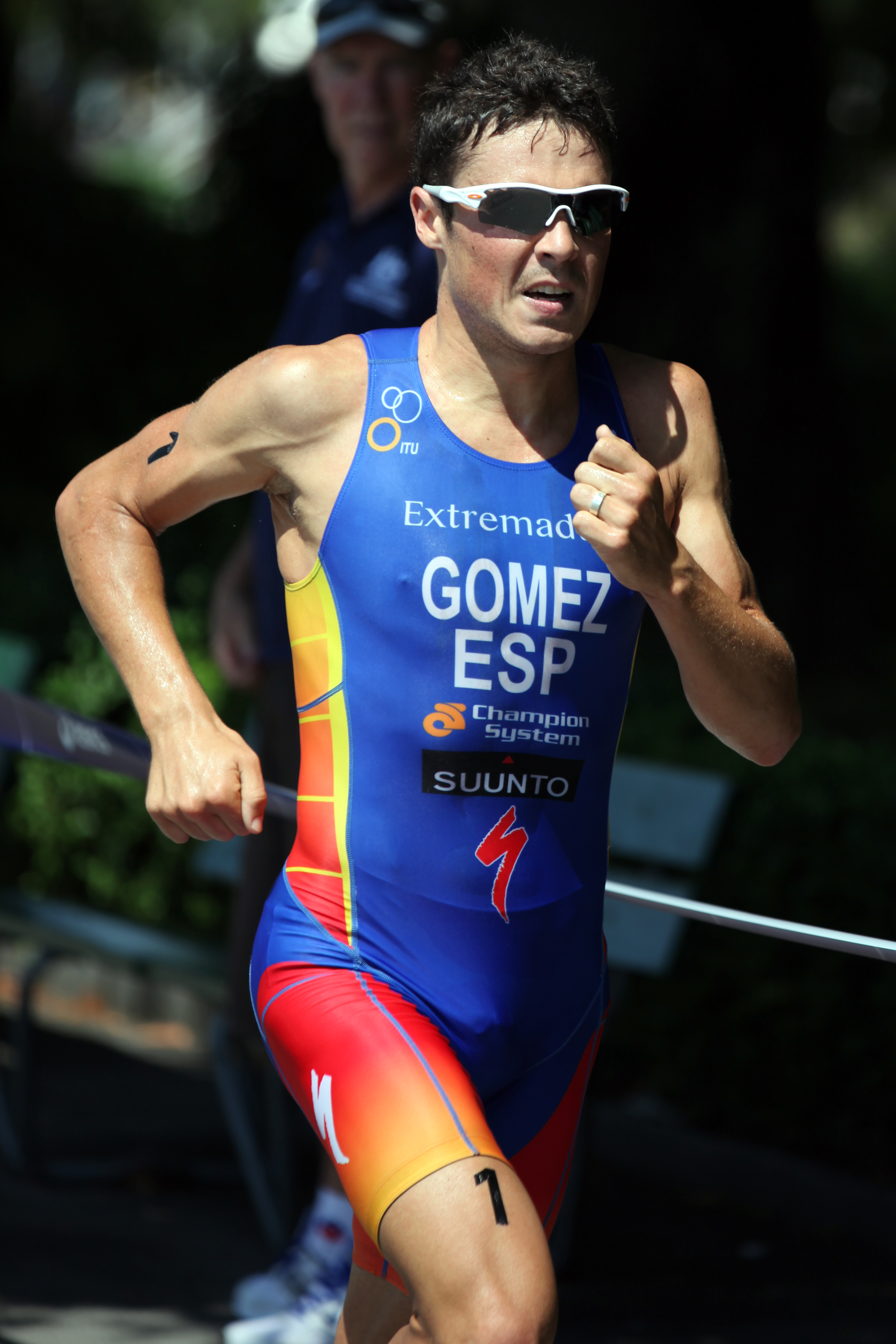
Javier Gómez at the Sprint World Championships in Lausanne, 2011.

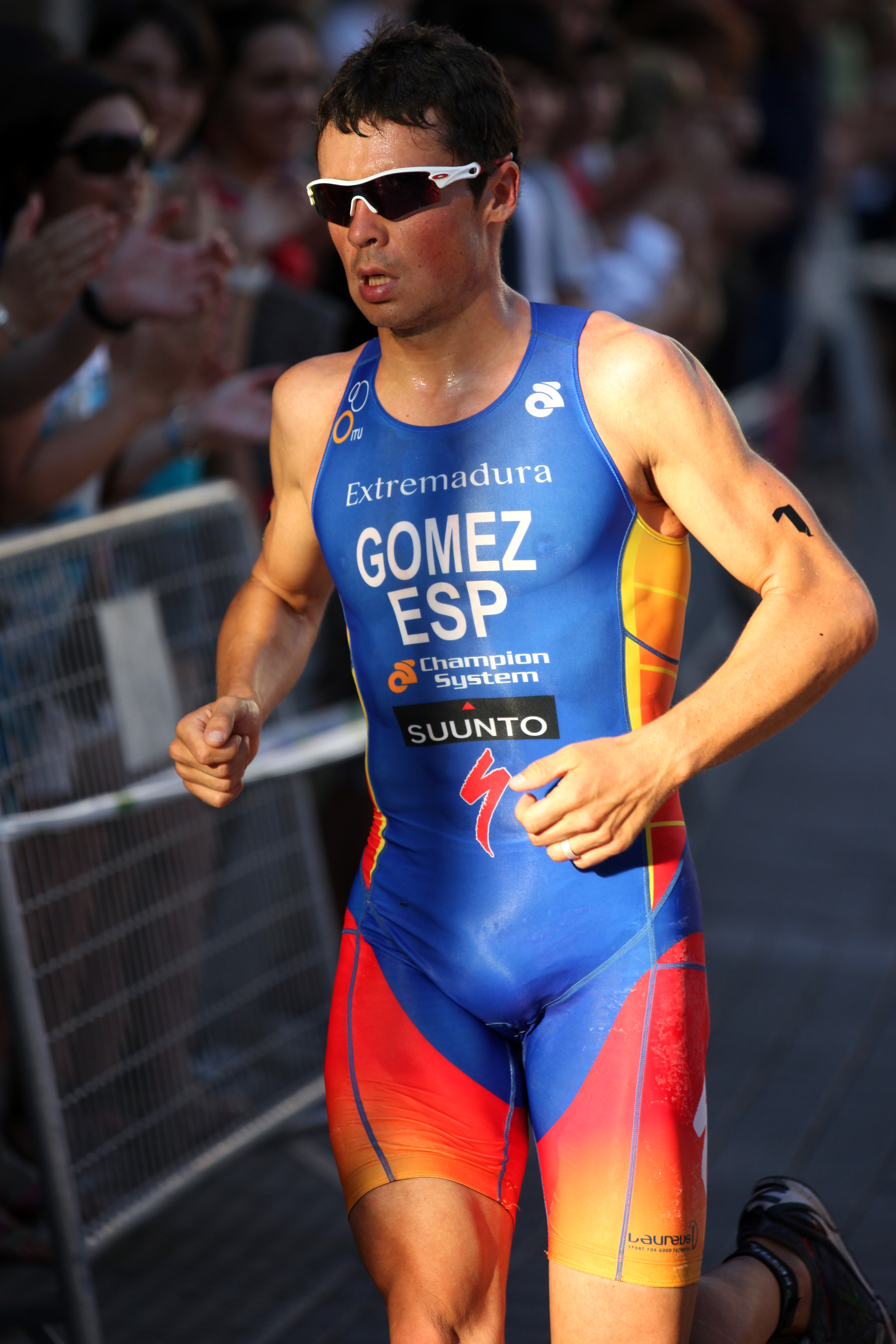
Javier Gómez at the European Championships in Pontevedra, 2011.

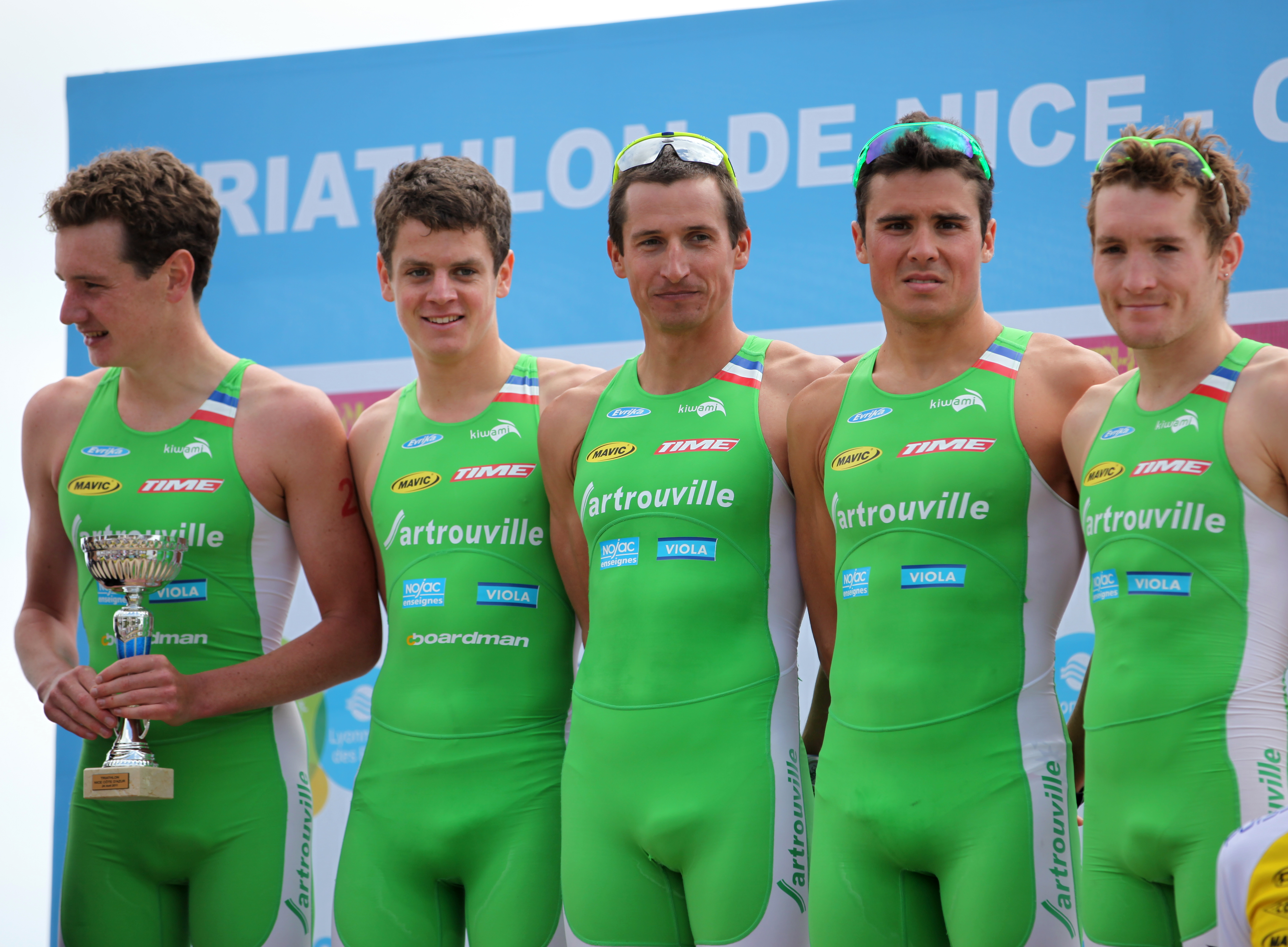
Javier Gómez with his two main rivals, his team mates Alistair and Jonathan Brownlee.

Awards
Preceded by Marc and Pau Gasol	Princess of Asturias Award for Sports; 2016	Succeeded by New Zealand national rugby union team
