= Felicity Abram =

Australian triathlete

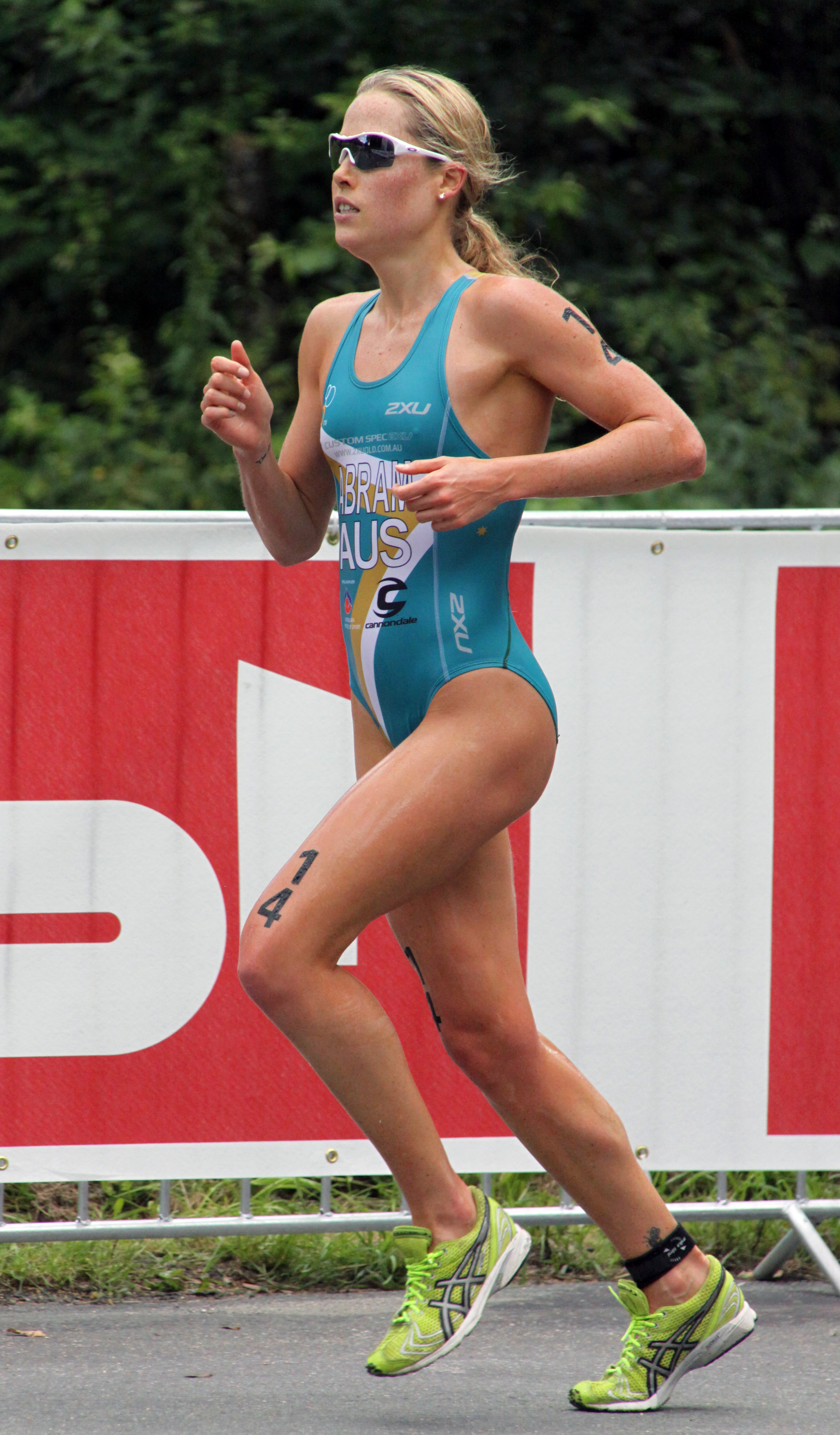
- Felicity Abram at the World Championship Series triathlon in Kitzbühel, 2010

Personal information
- Nicknames: Fliss, Flick, Flicka
- Born: 16 August 1986 (age 39) Brisbane, Queensland
- Occupation: Franchisee - Studio Pilates International
- Height: 169 cm (5 ft 7 in)

Sport
- Country: Australia
- Turned pro: 2003
- Coached by: Shaun Stephens . Brett Sutton
- Retired: 2016

Achievements and titles
- Highest world ranking: 1
- Personal best: World Championships Podiums

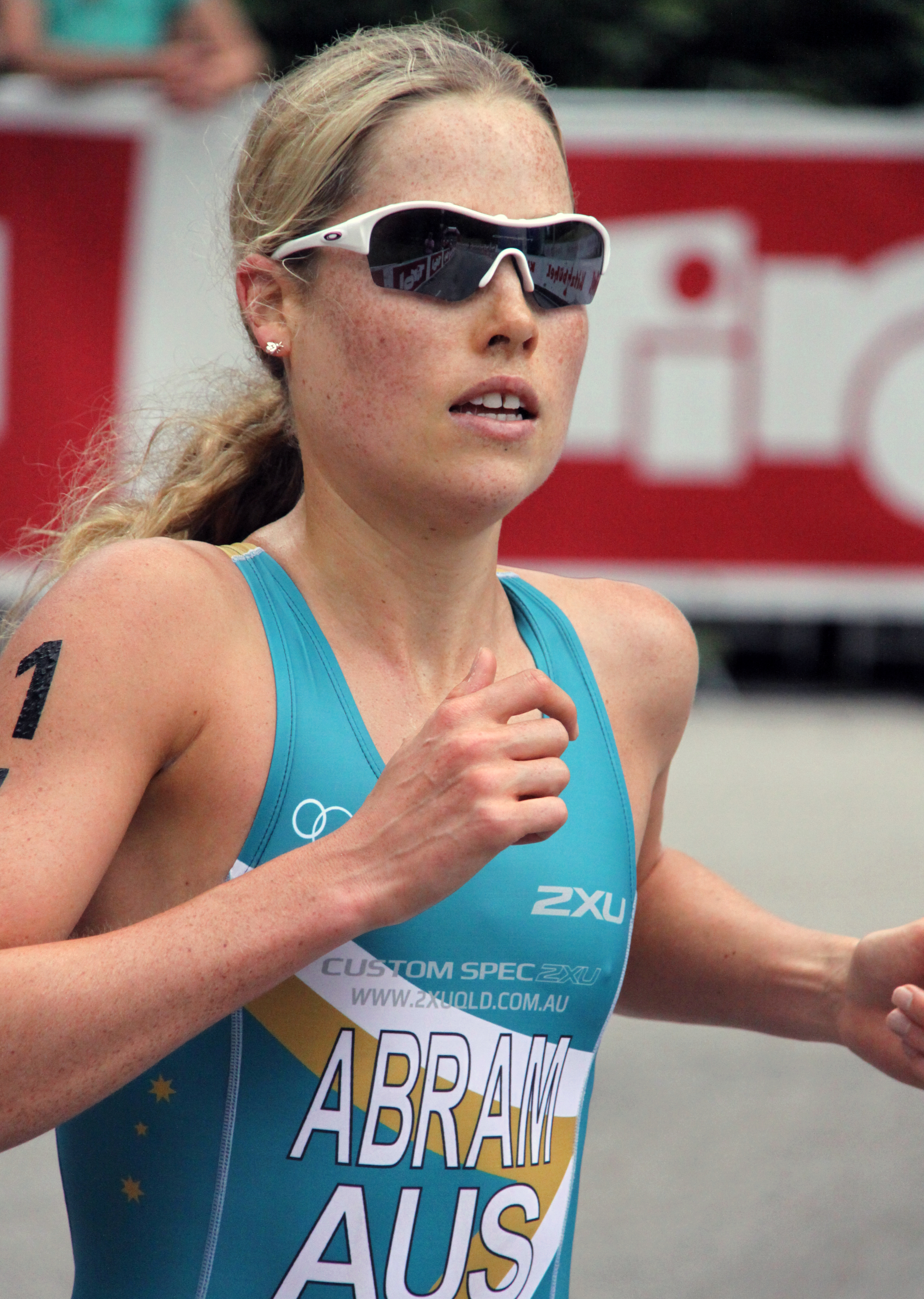
Felicity Abram placing 15th at the triathlon in Kitzbühel, 2010.

Felicity Abram (born 16 August 1986 in Brisbane, Queensland) Australian professional triathlete.

== Early life and education ==
Felicity Abram, or more often known as Flick, was born on 16 August 1986 in Brisbane, Queensland, to Louisa and Bill Abram. She spent her early years outside on the family's 20,000-acre estate in Central Queensland.

Later on, she moved to Brisbane to attend Brisbane Girls Grammar School, where she completed most of her schooling, before finishing at St Peters Lutheran College under athletic scholarship in 2003.

She was an Australian Institute of Sport scholarship holder.

== Career ==
In 2003, at her very first ITU triathlon debut, Felicity Abram won the Gold medal at the World Junior Championships ahead of Vanessa Fernandes and Maxine Seear in Queenstown, NZ .. In 2005, at the young age of 18, she was admitted to the Australian National Elite Team and placed a creditable 6th at her first Elite World Championship . Under the coaching of Australian Shaun Stephens, 2006 marked a highlight in her career with a Bronze medal at the World Championship in Lausanne . In 2006 Felicity also got selected for Australia in the Commonwealth Games, Melbourne . In 2008 she was the Number 1 in the ITU World rankings, still the Australian Triathlon federation did not appoint her as a member of the Olympic Team for Beijing. Throughout her career she was selected to represent Australia in 8 Elite World Championships .. Other highlights through her career include multiple Noosa Triathlon podiums & multiple FFTRI podiums under French Tri Team TCG Parthenay . In later half of 2013 she sustained an injury that would never see her return to ITU racing . She formally retired in 2016, however she does take part in charity events .

=== ITU competitions ===
Felicity started in a total 52 International Triathlon Union races including 12 podiums and 5 wins . The following list is based upon the official ITU rankings and the Athlete's Profile Page. Unless indicated otherwise the following events are triathlons (Olympic Distance) and belong to the Elite category.

Date	Competition	Place	Rank
2003-12-06	World Championships (Junior)	Queenstown	1
2004-02-21	OCA Oceania Championships	Devonport	4
2005-01-30	OTU Oceania Championships (U23)	Sydney	1
2005-04-16	World Cup	Honolulu	8
2005-05-01	World Cup	Mooloolaba	6
2005-08-06	World Cup	Hamburg	11
2005-09-10	World Championships	Gamagori	6
2006-03-18	Commonwealth Games Triathlon	Melbourne	14
2006-07-23	BG World Cup	Corner Brook	8
2006-08-20	European Cup	Geneva	1
2006-09-02	World Championships	Lausanne	3
2007-03-04	OTU Oceania Championships	Geelong	6
2007-03-25	BG World Cup	Mooloolaba	23
2007-06-17	BG World Cup	Des Moines	11
2007-09-15	BG World Cup	Beijing	10
2008-03-01	Oceania Cup	Gold Coast	2
2008-03-30	BG World Cup	Mooloolaba	12
2008-04-06	BG World Cup	New Plymouth	3
2008-05-04	BG World Cup	Richards Bay	2
2008-05-25	BG World Cup	Madrid	21
2008-06-05	BG World Championships	Vancouver	6
2008-06-22	World Cup	Hy-Vee	14
2008-07-05	BG World Cup	Hamburg	2
2008-07-13	BG World Cup	Tiszaújváros	2
2008-09-27	BG World Cup	Lorient	11
2009-03-29	World Cup	Mooloolaba	5
2010-04-11	Dextro Energy World Championship Series	Sydney	11
2010-05-08	Dextro Energy World Championship Series	Seoul	27
2010-07-17	Dextro Energy World Championship Series	Hamburg	10
2010-07-24	Dextro Energy World Championship Series	London	23
2010-08-15	Dextro Energy World Championship Series	Kitzbuhel	15
2010-08-21	World Championships (Sprint)	Lausanne	5
2010-09-08	Dextro Energy World Championship Series, Grand Final	Budapest	26
2011-04-11	Dextro Energy World Championship Series	Sydney	15
2011-07-17	Dextro Energy World Championship Series	Hamburg	16
2011-08-07	Dextro Energy World Championship Series	London	22
2011-08-20	Dextro Energy World Championship Series	Laussane	10
2011-09-13	Dextro Energy World CHampionship Series, Grand Final	Beijing	13
2012-10-20	Barfoot & Thompson World Triathlon Grand Final	Auckland	18
2013-03-09	ITU Oceania Championship	Wellington	1
2013-04-06	ITU World Triathlon Championship	Auckland	3
2013-04-19	ITU World Triathlon Championship	San Diego	15
2013-06-01	ITU World Triathlon Championship	Madrid	5

BG = the sponsor British Gas ·
