= 2026 World Triathlon Championship Series =

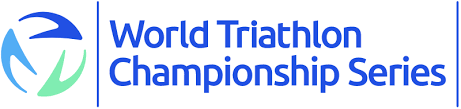
- League: World Triathlon Championship Series
- Sport: Triathlon

Men's Series
- World Champion: (Portugal) Vasco Vilaça (1st title)

Women's Series
- World Champion: (France) Cassandre Beaugrand (2nd title)

World Triathlon Championship Series seasons
- 2025 2027

The 2026 World Triathlon Championship Series is the 18th season of the World Triathlon Championship Series, the top level international series for triathlon, since its establishment in 2009, and will crown the 38th official World Triathlon Champion for both men and women since the first was crowned in 1989. The defending champions were Matthew Hauser of Australia and Lisa Tertsch of Germany.

The season consists of nine pairs of triathlon races for both a men's and women's competition, beginning on 14 April in Samarkand, and concluding on 27 September with the grand final in Pontevedra, Spain. A tenth race, the opening WTCS Abu Dhabi event was postponed due to the conflict in the middle East and adverse weather conditions.

The WTCS Abu Dhabi event was eventually rescheduled for after the Pontevedra Grand final, and so does not form part of this years overall world championship. It however remains a 'Championship Series' event for 2026, with identical ranking points and prize money, and will be held alongside the final WTCS mixed relay event for 2026, and the World Triathlon Multisports Championships..

The World Champion is decided on a cumulative points basis, with the sum of their three best points scores, plus their score in Pontevedra, deciding the series rankings, medallists and champions. In addition, points were available on a reduced scale for results in the relevant continental championship where it is held.

The Grand Final incorporates the 2026 World Triathlon Para Championships for elite para triathletes, the World championships in elite age-group classes (junior and under-23) and a number of amateur age-group championships in triathlon and aquabike.

== 2026 World Triathlon Championship Series summary ==
All standard distance races unless specified.

=== Men ===
Event	Gold	Silver	Bronze
World Triathlon Championship Series Events
Samarkand; Uzbekistan; April 25	Vasco Vilaça; Portugal	Henry Graf; Germany	Charles Paquet; Canada
Yokohama; Japan; May 16	Matthew Hauser; Australia	Miguel Hidalgo; Brazil	Luke Willian; Australia
Alghero; Italy; May 30	Vasco Vilaça; Portugal	Miguel Hidalgo; Brazil	Ricardo Batista; Portugal
Quiberon; France; June 20 (sprint)	Dorian Coninx; France	Vasco Vilaça; Portugal	Ricardo Batista; Portugal
Hamburg; Germany; July 11 (sprint)	Matthew Hauser; Australia	Vasco Vilaça; Portugal	Henry Graf; Germany
London; United Kingdom; July 25 (sprint)	Matthew Hauser; Australia	Vasco Vilaça; Portugal	Csongor Lehmann; Hungary
Weihai; China; August 29	Max Studer; Switzerland	David Cantero del Campo; Spain	Tyler Mislawchuk; Canada
Karlovy Vary; Czech Republic; September 14	Dorian Coninx; France	Alex Yee; Great Britain	Tjebbe Kaindl; Austria
Pontevedra : Grand Final; Spain; September 27	Matthew Hauser; Australia	Vasco Vilaça; Portugal	Alex Yee; Great Britain
Abu Dhabi : rescheduled United Arab Emirates; November 13	Miguel Hidalgo; Brazil	Matthew Hauser; Australia	Hayden Wilde; New Zealand
Continental championships
European Championships; Tarragona (Spain); June 13	Oliver Conway; Great Britain	Michael Gar; Great Britain	Roberto Sanchez Mantecon; Spain
Americas Championships; Antofagasta (Chile); July 4	Reece Vannerson; United States	Keller Norlund; United States	Mathis Beaulieu; Canada
Asian Games; Gamagōri (Japan); September 20	Takumi Hojo; Japan	Zhang Xirui; China	Arlan Zhanabay; Kazakhstan
African Championships; Antofagasta (Egypt); October 10	Jawad Abdelmoula; Morocco	Henri Schoeman; South Africa	Julian Birkel; South Africa
Oceania Championships; Devenport (Australia); March 14	Luke Willian; Australia	Callum McCloskey; Australia	Brendon Copeland; Australia
Overall^{World Championship}	Vasco Vilaça; Portugal	Matthew Hauser; Australia	Ricardo Batista; Portugal

=== Women ===
All standard distance races unless specified.

Event	Gold	Silver	Bronze
World Triathlon Championship Series Events
Samarkand; Uzbekistan; 25 April	Beth Potter; Great Britain	Léonie Périault; France	Jeanne Lehair; Luxembourg
Yokohama; Japan; May 16	Tilda Månsson; Sweden	Beth Potter; Great Britain	Jeanne Lehair; Luxembourg
Alghero; Italy; May 30	Cassandre Beaugrand; France	Beth Potter; Great Britain	Lisa Tertsch; Germany
Quiberon; France; June 21 (sprint)	Cassandre Beaugrand; France	Tilda Månsson; Sweden	Jolien Vermeylen; Belgium
Hamburg; Germany; July 11 (sprint)	Léonie Périault; France	Lisa Tertsch; Germany	Tilda Månsson; Sweden
London; United Kingdom; July 25 (sprint)	Cassandre Beaugrand; France	Lisa Tertsch; Germany	Tilda Månsson; Sweden
Weihai; China; August 29	Cassandre Beaugrand; France	Beth Potter; Great Britain	Lisa Tertsch; Germany
Karlovy Vary; Czech Republic; September 14	Georgia Taylor-Brown; Great Britain	Taylor Spivey; United States	Lisa Tertsch; Germany
Pontevedra : Grand Final; Spain; September 27	Cassandre Beaugrand; France	Georgia Taylor-Brown; Great Britain	Kate Waugh; Great Britain
Abu Dhabi : rescheduled United Arab Emirates; November 13	Diana Isavoka ^{(de)} Russia	Jeanne Lehair; Luxembourg	Gwen Jorgensen; United States
Continental championships
European Championships; Tarragona (Spain); June 13	Lisa Tertsch; Germany	Jolien Vermeylen; Belgium	Valentina Riasova; Individual Neutral Athletes
Americas Championships; Antofagasta (Chile); July 4	Danielle Orie; United States	Djenyfer Arnold; Brazil	Naomi Ruff; United States
Asian Games; Gamagōri (Japan); September 20	Lin Xinyu; China	Huang Anqi; China	Manami Hayashi; Japan
African Championships; Hurghada (Egypt); October 10	Shanae Williams; South Africa	Hannah Newman; South Africa	Kirstem Engelbrecht; South Africa
Oceania Championships; Devenport (Australia); March 14	Tara Sosinski; Australia	Zoe Clarke; Australia	Ellie Hoitink; Australia
Overall^{World Championship}	Cassandre Beaugrand; France	Beth Potter; Great Britain	Georgia Taylor-Brown; Great Britain

== Race results ==
=== Men ===
Key: OD - Olympic distance: SD - Sprint distance

Samarkand (Uzbekistan) ^{OD}

Rank	Athlete	Time
1st place, gold medalist(s)	Vasco Vilaça (POR)	1:43:33
2nd place, silver medalist(s)	Henry Graf (GER)	1:43:37
3rd place, bronze medalist(s)	Charles Paquet (CAN)	1:43:41
4	Csongor Lehmann (HUN)	1:43:47
5	Oliver Conway (GBR)	1:43:50
6	Tom Richard (FRA)	1:43:52
7	Hugo Milner (GBR)	1:43:55
8	Ricardo Batista (POR)	1:44:08
9	David Cantero Del Campo (ESP)	1:44:32
10	Ian Pennekamp (NED)	1:44:39

Quiberon (France) ^{SD}

Rank	Athlete	Time
1st place, gold medalist(s)	Dorian Coninx (FRA)	53:16
2nd place, silver medalist(s)	Vasco Vilaça (POR)	53:17
3rd place, bronze medalist(s)	Ricardo Batista (POR)	53:19
4	David Cantero Del Campo (ESP)	53:30
5	Miguel Hidalgo (BRA)	53:31
6	Nicola Azzano (ITA)	53:32
7	Henry Graf (GER)	53:32
8	John Reed (USA)	53:36
9	Tjebbe Kaindl (AUT)	53:38
10	Jawad Abdelmoula (MAR)	53:39

Weihei (China) ^{OD}

Rank	Athlete	Time
1st place, gold medalist(s)	Max Studer (SUI)	1:41:08
2nd place, silver medalist(s)	David Cantero Del Campo (ESP)	1:41:18
3rd place, bronze medalist(s)	Tyler Mislawchuk (CAN)	1:41:25
4	João Nuno Batista (POR)	1:41:41
5	Nicola Azzano (ITA)	1:41:54
6	Callum McClusky (AUS)	1:41:55
7	John Reed (USA)	1:41:59
8	Solomon Okrafo-Smart (GBR)	1:42:02
9	Alberto Gonzalez Garcia (ESP)	1:42:08
10	Matthew Hauser (AUS)	1:42:10

Yokohama (Japan) ^{OD}

Rank	Athlete	Time
1st place, gold medalist(s)	Matthew Hauser (AUS)	1:38:48
2nd place, silver medalist(s)	Miguel Hidalgo (BRA)	1:39:08
3rd place, bronze medalist(s)	Luke Willian (AUS)	1:39:16
4	Vetle Bergsvik Thorn (NOR)	1:39:21
5	Alex Yee (GBR)	1:39:32
6	Brayden Mercer (AUS)	1:40:29
7	Martin Sobey (CAN)	1:40:31
8	Jack Willis (GBR)	1:40:48
9	Tim Hellwig (GER)	1:40:59
10	Braxton Legg (USA)	1:41:01

Hamburg (Germany) ^{SD}

Rank	Athlete	Time
1st place, gold medalist(s)	Matthew Hauser (AUS)	50:07
2nd place, silver medalist(s)	Vasco Vilaça (POR)	50:10
3rd place, bronze medalist(s)	Henry Graf (GER)	50:15
4	Nils Serre Gehri (FRA)	50:19
5	Charles Paquet (CAN)	50:20
6	Connor Bentley (GBR)	50:24
7	Vetle Bergsvik Thorn (NOR)	50:27
8	Alberto Gonzalez Garcia (ESP)	50:32
9	Tim Hellwig (GER)	50:33
10	Tom Richard (FRA)	50:37

Karlovy Vary (Czech Republic) ^{OD}

Rank	Athlete	Time
1st place, gold medalist(s)	Dorian Coninx (FRA)	1:50:50
2nd place, silver medalist(s)	Alex Yee (GBR)	1:51:00
3rd place, bronze medalist(s)	Tjebbe Kaindl (AUT)	1:51:07
4	Ricardo Batista (POR)	1:51:18
5	Tim Hellwig (GER)	1:51:47
6	Márk Dévay (HUN)	1:51:55
7	Martin Sobey (CAN)	1:51:56
8	Mitch Kolkman (NED)	1:51:58
9	Yanis Seguin (FRA)	1:52:03
10	John Reed (USA)	1:52:12

Alghero (Italy) ^{OD}

Rank	Athlete	Time
1st place, gold medalist(s)	Vasco Vilaça (POR)	1:45:16
2nd place, silver medalist(s)	Miguel Hidalgo (BRA)	1:45:35
3rd place, bronze medalist(s)	Ricardo Batista (POR)	1:45:45
4	Dorian Coninx (FRA)	1:45:46
5	Charles Paquet (CAN)	1:45:49
6	Tom Richard (FRA)	1:45:50
7	João Nuno Batista (POR)	1:45:53
8	Yanis Seguin (FRA)	1:46:04
9	Alberto Gonzalez Garcia (ESP)	1:46:14
10	Diego Moya (CHI)	1:46:18

London (United Kingdom) ^{SD}

Rank	Athlete	Time
1st place, gold medalist(s)	Matthew Hauser (AUS)	50:28
2nd place, silver medalist(s)	Vasco Vilaça (POR)	50:31
3rd place, bronze medalist(s)	Csongor Lehmann (HUN)	50:36
4	Morgan Pearson (USA)	50:45
5	Alberto Gonzalez Garcia (ESP)	50:53
6	Tjebbe Kaindl (AUT)	50:53
7	Luke Willian (AUS)	50:55
8	Tom Richard (FRA)	50:57
9	Jules Rethoret (FRA)	50:59
10	Seth Rider (USA)	51:03

Grand Final Pontevedra (Spain) ^{OD}

Rank	Athlete	Time
1st place, gold medalist(s)	Matthew Hauser (AUS)	1:39:31
2nd place, silver medalist(s)	Vasco Vilaca (POR)	1:39:31
3rd place, bronze medalist(s)	Alex Yee (GBR)	1:39:35
4	Ricardo Batista (POR)	1:39:36
5	Hayden Wilde (NZL)	1:40:26
6	Dorian Coninx (FRA)	1:40:36
7	Dylan McCullough (NZL)	1:40:38
8	Roberto Sanchez Mantecon (ESP)	1:40:55
9	Connor Bentley (GBR)	1:41:07
10	Yanis Seguin (FRA)	1:41:08

=== Women ===
Key: OD - Olympic distance: SD - Sprint distance

Samarkand (Uzbekistan) ^{OD}

Rank	Athlete	Time
1st place, gold medalist(s)	Beth Potter (GBR)	1:53:17
2nd place, silver medalist(s)	Léonie Périault (FRA)	1:53:26
3rd place, bronze medalist(s)	Jeanne Lehair (LUX)	1:54:20
4	Georgia Taylor-Brown (GBR)	1:54:32
5	Taylor Spivey (USA)	1:54:53
6	Bianca Seregni (ITA)	1:55:05
7	Jolien Vermeylen (BEL)	1:55:05
8	Sian Rainsley (GBR)	1:55:09
9	Tanja Neubert (GER)	1:55:16
10	Tilly Anema (GBR)	1:55:21

Quiberon (France) ^{SD}

Rank	Athlete	Time
1st place, gold medalist(s)	Cassandre Beaugrand (FRA)	58:29
2nd place, silver medalist(s)	Tilda Månsson (SWE)	58:37
3rd place, bronze medalist(s)	Jolien Vermeylen (BEL)	58:42
4	Emma Lombardi (FRA)	58:51
5	Jeanne Lehair (LUX)	58:57
6	Valentina Riasova (RUS)	59:01
7	Georgia Taylor-Brown (GBR)	59:04
8	Mariana Vargem (POR)	59:07
9	Léonie Périault (FRA)	59:09
10	Gwen Jorgensen (USA)	59:12

Weihei (China) ^{OD}

Rank	Athlete	Time
1st place, gold medalist(s)	Cassandre Beaugrand (FRA)	1:49:20
2nd place, silver medalist(s)	Beth Potter (GBR)	1:49:26
3rd place, bronze medalist(s)	Lisa Tertsch (GER)	1:49:44
4	Anqi Huang (CHN)	1:50:33
5	Gwen Jorgensen (USA)	1:50:36
6	Roksana Slupek (POL)	1:50:44
7	Diana Isakova (RUS)	1:50:55
8	Desirae Ridenour (CAN)	1:50:58
9	Xinyu Lin (CHN)	1:51:02
10	Tanja Neubert (GER)	1:51:25

Yokohama (Japan) ^{OD}

Rank	Athlete	Time
1st place, gold medalist(s)	Tilda Månsson (SWE)	1:50:13
2nd place, silver medalist(s)	Beth Potter (GBR)	1:50:15
3rd place, bronze medalist(s)	Jeanne Lehair (LUX)	1:50:36
4	Lisa Tertsch (GER)	1:51:02
5	Emma Lombardi (FRA)	1:51:05
6	Diana Isakova (RUS)	1:51:09
7	Gwen Jorgensen (USA)	1:51:18
8	Taylor Spivey (USA)	1:51:38
9	Laura Lindemann (GER)	1:51:44
10	Sian Rainsley (GBR)	1:51:46

Hamburg (Germany) ^{SD}

Rank	Athlete	Time
1st place, gold medalist(s)	Léonie Périault (FRA)	55:51
2nd place, silver medalist(s)	Lisa Tertsch (GER)	55:56
3rd place, bronze medalist(s)	Tilda Månsson (SWE)	56:03
4	Taylor Spivey (USA)	56:05
5	Emma Lombardi (FRA)	56:08
6	Beth Potter (GBR)	56:15
7	Roksana Slupek (POL)	56:18
8	Jeanne Lehair (LUX)	56:19
9	Fanni Szalai (HUN)	56:19
10	Diana Isakova (RUS)	56:23

Karlovy Vary (Czech Republic) ^{OD}

Rank	Athlete	Time
1st place, gold medalist(s)	Georgia Taylor-Brown (GBR)	2:03:05
2nd place, silver medalist(s)	Taylor Spivey (USA)	2:03:41
3rd place, bronze medalist(s)	Lisa Tertsch (GER)	2:04:33
4	Jeanne Lehair (LUX)	2:05:06
5	Therese Feuersinger (AUT)	2:05:21
6	Beth Potter (GBR)	2:05:31
7	Marta Pintanel Raymundo (ESP)	2:05:37
8	Márta Kropkó (HUN)	2:05:42
9	Franka Rust (GER)	2:06:04
10	Kate Waugh (GBR)	2:06:21

Alghero (Italy) ^{OD}

Rank	Athlete	Time
1st place, gold medalist(s)	Cassandre Beaugrand (FRA)	1:53:49
2nd place, silver medalist(s)	Beth Potter (GBR)	1:53:53
3rd place, bronze medalist(s)	Lisa Tertsch (GER)	1:53:58
4	Jeanne Lehair (LUX)	1:54:09
5	Léonie Périault (FRA)	1:54:16
6	Georgia Taylor-Brown (GBR)	1:54:40
7	Jolien Vermeylen (BEL)	1:54:51
8	Taylor Spivey (USA)	1:55:20
9	Tanja Neubert (GER)	1:55:33
10	Márta Kropkó (HUN)	1:55:45

London (United Kingdom) ^{SD}

Rank	Athlete	Time
1st place, gold medalist(s)	Cassandre Beaugrand (FRA)	56:06
2nd place, silver medalist(s)	Lisa Tertsch (GER)	56:11
3rd place, bronze medalist(s)	Tilda Månsson (SWE)	56:21
4	Beth Potter (GBR)	56:26
5	Léonie Périault (FRA)	56:28
6	Georgia Taylor-Brown (GBR)	56:32
7	Taylor Knibb (USA)	56:33
8	Jeanne Lehair (LUX)	56:36
9	Diana Isakova (RUS)	56:42
10	Emma Lombardi (FRA)	56:43

Grand Final Pontevedra (Spain) ^{OD}

Rank	Athlete	Time
1st place, gold medalist(s)	Cassandre Beaugrand (FRA)	1:50:52
2nd place, silver medalist(s)	Georgia Taylor-Brown (GBR)	1:51:57
3rd place, bronze medalist(s)	Kate Waugh (GBR)	1:52:23
4	Beth Potter (GBR)	1:52:55
5	Laura Lindemann (GER)	1:53:05
6	Kirsten Kasper (USA)	1:53:10
7	Diana Isakova (AIN)	1:53:21
8	Leonie Periault (FRA)	1:53:47
9	Lisa Tertsch (GER)	1:53:52
10	Tanja Neubert (GER)	1:54:08

== Overall points totals ==
Men

Final points

Rank	Athlete	Points
1st place, gold medalist(s)	Vasco Vilaça (POR)	5006.25
2nd place, silver medalist(s)	Matthew Hauser (AUS)	4745.76
3rd place, bronze medalist(s)	Ricardo Batista (POR)	4071.45
4	Dorian Coninx (FRA)	3865.28
5	Miguel Hidalgo (BRA)	3152.18
6	Alex Yee (GBR)	3089.57
7	Alberto Gonzalez Garcia (ESP)	2771.61
8	Luke Willian (AUS)	2743.48
9	Csongor Lehmann (HUN)	2495.46
10	Tom Richard (FRA)	2494.17
11	David Cantero Del Campo (ESP)	2449.18
12	Tjebbe Kaindl (AUT)	2420.92
13	Henry Graf (GER)	2407.03
14	Charles Paquet (CAN)	2401.44
15	Yanis Seguin (FRA)	2388.20
16	João Nuno Batista (POR)	2307.64
17	Tim Hellwig (GER)	2196.38
18	Márk Dévay (HUN)	2057.15
19	Nicola Azzano (ITA)	2010.59
20	Martin Sobey (CAN)	1966.67

Women

Final points:

Rank	Athlete	Points
1st place, gold medalist(s)	Cassandre Beaugrand (FRA)	5250
2nd place, silver medalist(s)	Beth Potter (GBR)	4764.32
3rd place, bronze medalist(s)	Georgia Taylor-Brown (GBR)	4302.08
4	Lisa Tertsch (GER)	4231.21
5	Léonie Périault (FRA)	4113.45
6	Tilda Månsson (SWE)	3879.42
7	Jeanne Lehair (LUX)	3601.39
8	Taylor Spivey (USA)	3601.19
9	Emma Lombardi (FRA)	3205.07
10	Diana Isakova (AIN)	3118.31
11	Jolien Vermeylen (BEL)	2732.93
12	Tanja Neubert (GER)	2645.97
13	Laura Lindemann (GER)	2521.55
14	Franka Rust (GER)	2272.15
15	Gwen Jorgensen (USA)	2245.61
16	Roksana Slupek (POL)	2119.26
17	Kate Waugh (GBR)	1928.24
18	Sian Rainsley (GBR)	1926.17
19	Valentina Riasova (AIN)	1891.78
20	Kirsten Kasper (USA)	1855.18

== Mixed relay ==
Mixed relay events were held for elite athletes as part of the Championship Series. The event in Hamburg was designated the World Triathlon Mixed Relay Championships.

Event	Gold	Silver	Bronze
Quiberon France June 21	France; Léonie Périault; Yanis Seguin; Emma Lombardi; Dorian Coninx	Italy; Bianca Seregni; Nicola Azzano; Carlotta Missaglia; Euan de Nigro	Spain; Ana Carballo; Pelayo González; Marta Pintanel; Izan Edo Aguilar
Hamburg : World Championships Germany July 12	France; Léonie Périault; Tom Richard; Emma Lombardi; Dorian Coninx	Hungary; Márta Kropkó; Márk Dévay; Fanni Szalai; Csonger Lehmann	Great Britain; Beth Potter; Max Stapley; Jessica Fullagar; Oliver Conway
Abu Dhabi United Arab Emirates November 14	Spain; Sara Guerrero Manso; Antonio Serrat Seoane; Marta Pintanel Raymundo; David Cantero Del Campo	Australia; Emma Jeffcoat; Matthew Hauser; Matilda Offord; Luke Willian	Brazil; Djenyfer Arnold; Miguel Hidalgo; Vittoria Lopes; Manoel Messias

== List of 2026 World Championship podiums ==
The following is a list of all the World Championship medalists (not including para-triathlon; see below) crowned on the various legs of the World Triathlon Championship series up to and including Pontevedra. The majority of those disciplines outside the elite men's and women's events are decided in single championship races in Pontevedra. The Elite mixed relay world championship was held at the Hamburg leg of the World Triathlon Championship series. While three of the Championship Series legs were in sprint format, no specific Elite sprint distance championship was designated in 2026.

The championships awarded alongside the WTCS Abu Dhabi event are set out further below.

=== Elite ===
Event	Gold	Silver	Bronze
Elite
Men's individual Season long	Vasco Vilaça; Portugal	Matthew Hauser; Australia	Ricardo Batista; Portugal
Women's individual Season long	Cassandre Beaugrand; France	Beth Potter; Great Britain	Georgia Taylor-Brown; Great Britain
Under-23
Men's individual	Nils Serre Gehri; France	Michael Gar; Great Britain	Zalán Hóbor; Hungary
Women's individual	Ilona Hadhoum; France	Léa Houart; France	Sidney Clement; Canada
Junior
Men's individual	Thibault Rivier; Switzerland	Dinis Ferreira; Portugal	Jelle Kaindl; Austria
Women's individual	Fanni Szalai; Hungary	Anouk Danna; Switzerland	Kimey Casanova; Switzerland
Mixed relay
Elite	France; Léonie Périault; Tom Richard; Emma Lombardi; Dorian Coninx	Hungary; Márta Kropkó; Márk Dévay; Fanni Szalai; Csonger Lehmann	Great Britain; Beth Potter; Max Stapley; Jessica Fullagar; Oliver Conway
U-23/Junior	France	Hungary	Spain

=== Medal table ===
* Host nation (Spain)

World Triathlon Championships medal table (elite)
Rank	Nation	Gold	Silver	Bronze	Total
1	France	5	1	0	6
2	Hungary	1	2	1	4
3	Portugal	1	1	1	3
3	Switzerland	1	1	1	3
5	Great Britain	0	2	2	4
6	Australia	0	1	0	1
7	Austria	0	0	1	1
7	Canada	0	0	1	1
7	Spain*	0	0	1	1
Totals (9 entries)		8	8	8	24

== 2026 World Triathlon Para Championships ==
2026 World Triathlon Para Championships
- League: World Triathlon Para Championships
- Sport: Paratriathlon

Men's Series
- World Champions: PTWC : Thomas Frühwirth; PTS2 : Jules Ribstein; PTS3 : Henry Urand; PTS4 : Alexis Hanquinquant; PTS5 : Chris Hammer; PTVI : Dave Ellis

Women's Series
- World Champions: PTWC : Lauren Parker; PTS2 : Hailey Danz; PTS3 : Serena Banzato; PTS4 : Camille Sénéclauze; PTS5 : Grace Norman; PTVI : Susana Rodriguez

Open mixed relay

World Triathlon Para Championship seasons
- 2025 2027

The 2026 World Triathlon Para Championships, a series of single event championship races to crown world champions from para-triathlon will be held on 25 (individual) and 27 (mixed relay) September 2026 as part of the series of events around the 2026 World Triathlon Championship Series Grand Final in Pontevedra, Spain.

=== Medalists ===
Event	Gold	Silver	Bronze
Men's
PTWC	Thomas Frühwirth; Austria	Florian Brungraber; Austria	Joseph Fritsch; France
PTS2	Jules Ribstein; France	Mohamed Lahna; United States	Wim de Paepe; Belgium
PTS3	Henry Urand; Great Britain	Daniel Molina; Spain	Stylianos Malakopolous; Greece
PTS4	Alexis Hanquinquant; France	Nil Riudavets; Spain	Pierre-Antoine Baele; France
PTS5	Chris Hammer; United States	Martin Schulz; Germany	Filipe Marques; Portugal
PTVI	Dave Ellis; Great Britain	Lazar Filipovic; Serbia	Antoine Perel; France
Women's
PTWC	Lauren Parker; Australia	Kendall Gretsch; United States	Emelia Perry; United States
PTS2	Hailey Danz; United States	Anu Francis; Australia	Asumi Yasuda; Japan
PTS3	Serena Banzato; Italy	Élise Marc; France	Kassandra Case; United States
PTS4	Camille Seneclauze; France	Zoé Reveillon; France	Kelly Elmlinger; United States
PTS5	Grace Norman; United States	Erica da Rosa Rodrigues; Brazil	Lauren Steadman; Great Britain
PTVI	Susana Rodriguez; Spain	Francesca Tarantello; Italy	Anja Renner; Germany
Mixed relay
Mixed Para Relay	United States; Kendall Gretsch; Carson Clough; Grace Norman; Owen Cravens	Australia; Lauren Parker; Matthew Engesser; Maggie Sandles; Jack Howell	Brazil; Jéssica Messali; Ruiter Antonio Gonçalves*; Erica da Rosa Rodrigues *ran two stages

=== Result summary ===
(top ten only)

Men

PTWC

Rank	Athlete	Time
1st place, gold medalist(s)	Thomas Frühwirth (AUT) (H1)	1:02:33
2nd place, silver medalist(s)	Florian Brungraber (AUT) (H2)	1:03:28
3rd place, bronze medalist(s)	Joseph Fritsch (FRA) (H1)	1:04:36
4	Louis Noel (FRA) (H2)	1:05:42
5	Giuseppe Romele (ITA) (H1)	1:06:04
6	Howie Sanborn (USA) (H1)	1:06:45
7	Joshua Landmann (GBR) (H2)	1:12:13
8	Jumpei Kimura (JPN) (H1)	1:14:31
9	Justin Pines (USA) (H1)	1:15:18
-	Fathi Zwoukhi (TUN) (H1)	DNF

PTS2

Rank	Athlete	Time
1st place, gold medalist(s)	Jules Ribstein (FRA)	1:12:27
2nd place, silver medalist(s)	Mohamed Lahna (USA)	1:12:41
3rd place, bronze medalist(s)	Wim De Paepe (BEL)	1:13:14
4	Gianluca Valori (ITA)	1:15:38
5	Lionel Morales (ESP)	1:17:13
6	Kyle Stepp (USA)	1:17:41
7	Thomas Goodman (AUS)	1:21:38
8	Kenshiro Nakayama (JPN)	1:25:21
9	Jeromius Rooi (NAM)	1:32:07
10	Diego Alfonso Lares García (MEX)	1:35:24

PTS3

Rank	Athlete	Time
1st place, gold medalist(s)	Henry Urand (GBR)	1:07:17
2nd place, silver medalist(s)	Daniel Molina (ESP)	1:09:11
3rd place, bronze medalist(s)	Stylianos Malakopoulos (GRE)	1:10:13
4	Valentin Hanzer (GER)	1:10:16
5	Cedric Denuziere (FRA)	1:10:25
6	Ryan Taylor (GBR)	1:11:04
7	Zachary Osborne (USA)	1:15:05
8	Lucas Jundt (USA)	1:15:36
9	Jonas Souza (BRA)	1:20:23

PTS4

Rank	Athlete	Time
1st place, gold medalist(s)	Alexis Hanquinquant (FRA)	59:54
2nd place, silver medalist(s)	Nil Riudavets Victory (ESP)	1:00:07
3rd place, bronze medalist(s)	Pierre-Antoine Baele (FRA)	1:00:17
4	Antoîne Lamarche Poulain (FRA)	1:02:00
5	Antonio Franko (CRO)	1:05:41
6	Carson Clough (USA)	1:05:50
7	Hideki Uda (JPN)	1:06:13
8	Matthew Engesser (AUS)	1:06:24
9	Jeremy Peacock (AUS)	1:07:02
10	Samuel Rodriguez Masian (ESP)	1:08:29

PTS5

Rank	Athlete	Time
1st place, gold medalist(s)	Chris Hammer (USA)	1:00:06
2nd place, silver medalist(s)	Martin Schulz (GER)	1:00:22
3rd place, bronze medalist(s)	Filipe Marques (POR)	1:00:26
4	Bence Mocsari (HUN)	1:00:32
5	Jack Howell (AUS)	1:01:04
6	Stefan Daniel (CAN)	1:01:28
7	Oliver Scott (GBR)	1:02:59
8	David Bryant (AUS)	1:03:23
9	Ugurcan Ozer (TUR)	1:04:45
10	Oscar Dennis (KEN)	1:05:14

PTVI

Rank	Athlete	Time
1st place, gold medalist(s)	Dave Ellis (GBR) B3	1:00:37
2nd place, silver medalist(s)	Lazar Filipovic (SRB) (B1)	1:00:56
3rd place, bronze medalist(s)	Antoine Perel (FRA) (B1)	1:01:13
4	Sam Harding (AUS) (B2)	1:01:20
5	Thibaut Rigaudeau (FRA) (B3)	1:01:30
6	Héctor Catalá Laparra (ESP) (B2)	1:02:08
7	Owen Cravens (USA) (B3)	1:03:02
8	Łukasz Wietecki (POL) (B3)	1:03:16
9	Diego Molina Martin (ESP) (B3)	1:05:10
10	Abel Torreblanca Lopez (ESP) (B3)	1:07:36

Women

PTWC

Rank	Athlete	Time
1st place, gold medalist(s)	Lauren Parker (AUS) (H1)	1:10:13
2nd place, silver medalist(s)	Kendall Gretsch (USA) (H2)	1:11:18
3rd place, bronze medalist(s)	Emelia Perry (USA) (H1)	1:11:25
4	Jéssica Messali (BRA) (H1)	1:14:23
5	Leanne Taylor (CAN) (H1)	1:16:21
6	Eva María Moral Pedrero (ESP) (H1)	1:16:41
7	Brenda Osnaya Alvarez (MEX) (H1)	1:17:59

PTS2

Rank	Athlete	Time
1st place, gold medalist(s)	Hailey Danz (USA)	1:19:37
2nd place, silver medalist(s)	Anu Francis (AUS)	1:22:07
3rd place, bronze medalist(s)	Asumi Yasuda (JPN)	1:23:45
4	Emma Juaisca Rodriguez Rodriguez (VEN)	1:28:18
5	Yukako Hata (JPN)	1:28:27
6	Martina Abaterusso (ITA)	1:29:59
7	Neele Ludwig (GER)	1:32:50
8	Gitte Welslau (BEL)	1:36:27

PTS3

Rank	Athlete	Time
1st place, gold medalist(s)	Serena Banzato (ITA)	1:21:30
2nd place, silver medalist(s)	Elise Marc (FRA)	1:23:47
3rd place, bronze medalist(s)	Kassandra Case (USA)	1:25:42
4	Kenia Yesenia Villalobos Vargas (MEX)	1:26:47
5	Atalia Nevo (ISR)	1:32:29

PTS4

Rank	Athlete	Time
1st place, gold medalist(s)	Camille Seneclauze (FRA)	1:15:34
2nd place, silver medalist(s)	Zoé Reveillon (FRA)	1:18:04
3rd place, bronze medalist(s)	Kelly Elmlinger (USA)	1:19:27
4	Danielle Cummings (USA)	1:19:58
5	Hannah Moore (GBR)	1:20:26
6	Ingrid De Oude (NED)	1:22:39
7	Mami Tani (JPN)	1:24:05
8	Kübra Dere (TUR)	1:35:14
-	Rafaela Rojas (CHI)	DSQ
-	Ana Lucia Vicente Garcia (MEX)	DSQ

PTS5

Rank	Athlete	Time
1st place, gold medalist(s)	Grace Norman (USA)	1:08:19
2nd place, silver medalist(s)	Erica Da Rosa Rodrigues (BRA)	1:10:00
3rd place, bronze medalist(s)	Lauren Steadman (GBR)	1:10:29
4	Grace Brimelow (AUS)	1:12:36
5	Alisa Kolpakchy (UKR)	1:13:09
6	Claire Cashmore (GBR)	1:13:35
7	Virginia Ogburn (USA)	1:14:42
8	Monika Belczewska (POL)	1:15:51
9	Maria Fuertes Artigot (ESP)	1:17:38

PTVI

Rank	Athlete	Time
1st place, gold medalist(s)	Susana Rodriguez (ESP) (B1)	1:06:37
2nd place, silver medalist(s)	Francesca Tarantello (ITA) (B3)	1:08:30
3rd place, bronze medalist(s)	Anja Renner (GER) (B3)	1:09:44
4	Leticia Freitas (BRA) (B1)	1:10:03
5	Maggie Sandles (AUS) (B3)	1:10:08
6	Judith MacCombe (IRL) (B3)	1:10:37
7	Chloe MacCombe (IRL) (B3)	1:12:29
8	Margot Wehrle (CAN) (B1)	1:19:20
9	Caroline Baird (AUS) (B3)	1:19:35
10	Gulnaz Zhuzbaeva B1 (KGZ)	1:21:10

Mixed relay

=== Medal table ===
* Host nation (Spain)

World Para-triathlon Championships medal table
Rank	Nation	Gold	Silver	Bronze	Total
1	France	3	2	3	8
1	United States	3	2	3	8
3	Great Britain	2	0	1	3
4	Spain*	1	2	0	3
5	Australia	1	1	0	2
5	Austria	1	1	0	2
5	Italy	1	1	0	2
8	Germany	0	1	1	2
9	Brazil	0	1	0	1
9	Serbia	0	1	0	1
11	Belgium	0	0	1	1
11	Greece	0	0	1	1
11	Japan	0	0	1	1
11	Portugal	0	0	1	1
Totals (14 entries)		12	12	12	36

== 2026 World Triathlon Junior and Under-23 Finals ==
(top ten only)

Junior

Both junior races were over the sprint distance.

Men

Rank	Athlete	Overall time	Gap
1st place, gold medalist(s)	Thibault Rivier (SUI)	54:05	-
2nd place, silver medalist(s)	Dinis Ferreira (POR)	54:07	+ 2
3rd place, bronze medalist(s)	Jelle Kaindl (AUT)	54:17	+ 12
4	Caleb Wagener (NZL)	54:19	+ 14
5	Reuben Wadey (GBR)	54:20	+ 15
6	Leni Remer-Mancini (FRA)	54:28	+ 23
7	Christian Ache (GER)	54:34	+ 29
8	Sebastian Zurob (CHI)	54:40	+ 35
9	Sebastian Ziekman (LUX)	54:42	+ 37
10	Brice Allen (USA)	54:44	+ 39

Women

Rank	Athlete	Overall time	Gap
1st place, gold medalist(s)	Fanni Szalai (HUN)	59:21	-
2nd place, silver medalist(s)	Anouk Danna (SUI)	59:58	+ 37
3rd place, bronze medalist(s)	Kimey Casanova (SUI)	1:00:39	+ 1:18
4	Candela Sánchez Touza (ESP)	1:00:54	+ 1:33
5	Jázmin Kropkó (HUN)	1:00:58	+ 1:37
6	Carlotta Bülck (GER)	1:01:06	+ 1:45
7	Ava Martha Brambier (GER)	1:01:14	+ 1:53
8	Luca Vanderbruggen (BEL)	1:01:20	+ 1:59
9	Hannah Pollock (AUS)	1:01:27	+ 2:06
10	Lauren Mitchell (GBR)	1:01:45	+ 2:24

Under-23

Both under-23 races were over the standard Olympic distance.

Men

Rank	Athlete	Overall time	Gap
1st place, gold medalist(s)	Nils Serre Gehri (FRA)	1:46:01	-
2nd place, silver medalist(s)	Michael Gar (GBR)	1:46:22	+ 21
3rd place, bronze medalist(s)	Zalán Hóbor (HUN)	1:46:24	+ 23
4	Izan Edo Aguilar (ESP)	1:46:30	+ 29
5	Solomon Okrafo-Smart (GBR)	1:46:34	+ 33
6	Jaspar Ortfeld (GER)	1:46:37	+ 36
7	Pelayo González Turrez (ESP)	1:47:02	+ 1:01
8	Brandon Pye (GBR)	1:47:07	+ 1:06
9	Jens Smolders (BEL)	1:47:15	+ 1:14
10	Panagiotis Bitados (GRE)	1:47:16	+ 1:15

Women

Rank	Athlete	Overall time	Gap
1st place, gold medalist(s)	Ilona Hadhoum (FRA)	1:58:11	-
2nd place, silver medalist(s)	Léa Houart (FRA)	1:59:26	+ 1:15
3rd place, bronze medalist(s)	Sidney Clement (CAN)	2:01:06	+ 2:55
4	Naomi Ruff (USA)	2:01:23	+ 3:12
5	Bethany Cook (GBR)	2:01:30	+ 3:19
6	Jule Behrens (GER)	2:01:39	+ 3:28
7	Eve Whitaker (GBR)	2:01:46	+ 3:35
8	María López Faraudo (MEX)	2:01:54	+ 3:43
9	María Teresa Jiménez-Orta Guerrero (ESP)	2:02:21	+ 4:10
10	Aspen Anderson (AUS)	2:02:22	+ 4:11

Jr-U23 Mixed relay

Rank	Team	Time
1st place, gold medalist(s)	Team France	1:07:45
2nd place, silver medalist(s)	Team Hungary	1:07:59
3rd place, bronze medalist(s)	Team Spain	1:08:09
4	(United Kingdom) Team Great Britain	1:08:18
5	Team Australia	1:08:32
6	Team Germany	1:08:38
7	Team United States	1:08:48
8	Team Belgium	1:09:55
9	Team Switzerland	1:10:04
10	Team Poland	1:10:16

== 2026 World Triathlon and Aquabike Age-group Championships ==
The following list is of the age-group champions crowned in sprint triathlon, standard triathlon and aquabike at World Triathlon Championship Series events at the Grand Final at Ponteverda. Elite junior and under-23 championship races held outside the WTCS format, and the Para-triathlon World Championship races are not included.

The men's races were redesignated 'Open' races to enhance inclusivity.

Triathlon Sprint : 24 September; Standard : 26 September

Age-grade	Open standard	Women's standard	Open sprint	Women's sprint
Age-grade	Pontevedra, Spain			
16-19	Samuel Fernandez; Spain	Molly Smith; Great Britain	Aiden Monistere; United States	Mia Caple; Australia
20-24	Wouter Schuit; Netherlands	Miriam Gilbride; Great Britain	Benedek Péter; Hungary	Maja Wasik; Poland
25-29	Will Austin; Great Britain	Nina Norris-Evans; Great Britain	Quentin Fantoli; Switzerland	Bethan Jones; Great Britain
30-34	Jakub Brzóska; Poland	Claudia Slapka; Germany	Krzysztof Adrjanowski; Poland	Barbra Barany-Balogh; Hungary
35-39	Thomas Bill; Great Britain	Amanda Quinlan; United States	Panagiotis Dimopoulos; Greece	Ourania Nomikou; Greece
40-44	Sylwester Kuster; Poland	Long Hoi; Macau	Alessandro D'Ambrosio; Italy	Long Hoi; Macau
45-49	Donald Brooks; Great Britain	Sonia Bejarano Sanchez; Spain	Donald Brooks; Great Britain	Szofia Malatinszky; Hungary
50-54	Cesar Pereira; Spain	Amelita Sved; Hungary	Francesc de Lanuza; Spain	Sione Jongstra; Netherlands
55-59	Paul Kelly; United States	Bettina Lange; Germany	Rudolf Cogan; Czech Republic	Bettina Lange; Germany
60-64	Christophe Jouffret; France	Juliet Vickery; Great Britain	Grzegorz Zgliczynski; Poland	Katjana Quest-Altrogge; Germany
65-69	Denis Peirrat; France	Hilary Briggs; Great Britain	Hermann Limburg; Germany	Barbara Holmes; Great Britain
70-74	Alfi Caprez; Switzerland	Linda Russell-Bond; Great Britain	Hans Porten; Canada	Linda Russell-Bond; Great Britain
75-79	Peter Staple; United States	Elspeth Knott; Great Britain	Marc Pigeon; France	Joy Baker; New Zealand
80-84	Roger Freeman; United States	Ayoko Kawasaki; Japan	Michael Smallwood; Great Britain	Jennifer Peel; Great Britain
85-89	Gherardo Mercati; Italy	Peggy Mcdowell-Cramer; United States	Gherardo Mercati; Italy	—N/a

Aquabike Standard : 26 September

Age-grade	Open standard	Women's standard
Age-grade	Pontevedra, Spain	
16-19	—N/a	Rose Guihard; France
20-24	Sam Holwill; Great Britain	Andrea Benitez Moreno; Mexico
25-29	Victor Gutierrez Garcia; Spain	Rosie May-Bennett; Great Britain
30-34	Ross Hosking; Great Britain	Haylay Lyall; Australia
35-39	Jorge Serra; Spain	Stephanie Oechsner; United States
40-44	Thomas Winkelmann; Germany	Andrea Damiani; Canada
45-49	Victor Sanchez Garcia; Spain	Kerry Hickson; Great Britain
50-54	Tommy Neilsen; Denmark	Barbara Petryshen-Kovak; Canada
55-59	Frank Erk; Germany	Kai Sachtleber; Germany
60-64	Blair Saunders; United States	Stephanie Brown; Canada
65-69	Terry Johnson; Great Britain	Andrea Nightingale; Great Britain
70-74	Christos Garefis; Greece	Heather Grahame; United States
75-79	Peter McLoud; New Zealand	—N/a
80-84	Michael Smallwood; Great Britain	—N/a
85-89	Raymond Eastwood; United States	—N/a

Mixed relay

Mixed Relay : 27 September

Each mixed relay team consists of two men and two women whose ages must add up to a number within the range for the event. Where nations entered multiple teams in a classification they are designated numbers (I, II, etc); the designated number of the winning team is noted.

Age-grade	Mixed relay
Age-grade	Pontevedra, Spain
Mixed 60-79	Team Australia I
Mixed 80-119	Team Poland I
Mixed 120-159	Team Great Britain I
Mixed 160-199	Team Germany I
Mixed 200-239	Team Hungary II
Mixed 249-279	Team Germany II
Mixed 280-319	Team Great Britain I

== WTCS Abu Dhabi and World Triathlon Multisports Championships ==
The postponed Abu Dhabi leg of the Championship Series was rescheduled for after the conclusion of the Grand Final in Pontevedra; while it retained its title, prize money, ranking points and Championship Series status; it was not included in the points calculation for the World Championship. Instead the event, including the mixed relay triathlon, became part of the 2026 World Triathlon Multisports Championships already organised for Abu Dhabi.

WTCS Abu Dhabi (United Arab Emirates)

sprint distance

Men

Rank	Athlete	Total time
1st place, gold medalist(s)	Miguel Hidalgo (BRA)	49:02
2nd place, silver medalist(s)	Matthew Hauser (AUS)	49:20
3rd place, bronze medalist(s)	Hayden Wilde (NZL)	49:43
4	Ian Pennekamp (NED)	49:54
5	Luke Willian (AUS)	49:54
6	Braxton Legg (USA)	49:55
7	Shachar Sagiv (ISR)	49:55
8	Antonio Serrat Seoane (ESP)	49:57
9	Mitch Kolkman (NED)	50:00
10	Darr Smith (USA)	50:02

Women

Rank	Athlete	Total time
1st place, gold medalist(s)	Diana Isakova (RUS)	55:55
2nd place, silver medalist(s)	Jeanne Lehair (LUX)	55:58
3rd place, bronze medalist(s)	Gwen Jorgensen (USA)	56:23
4	Laura Lindemann (GER)	56:29
5	Lisa Tertsch (GER)	56:31
6	Djenyfer Arnold (BRA)	56:35
7	Eve Whitaker (GBR)	56:39
8	Angelica Prestia (ITA)	56:42
9	Marta Pintanel Raymundo (ESP)	56:44
10	Nina Eim (GER)	56:46

Mixed Relay

Rank	Nation	Total Time	Gap
1st place, gold medalist(s)	Spain	1:18:14	—
2nd place, silver medalist(s)	Australia	1:18:16	+0:02
3rd place, bronze medalist(s)	Brazil	1:18:20	+0:06
4	Russia	1:18:27	+0:13
5	Germany	1:18:27	+0:13
6	Switzerland	1:18:30	+0:16
7	Great Britain	1:18:32	+0:18
8	Belgium	1:18:38	+0:24
9	United States	1:18:39	+0:25
10	Netherlands	1:18:44	+0:30

== See also ==
- 2026 T100 Triathlon World Tour, the World Triathlon recognised elite global event organised by the Professional Triathletes Organisation and contested over the 100 kilometre format, approximately 2.5 times longer than WTCS events.
