= 2025 European Triathlon Para Championships =

Para triathlon competition held in Besançon, France

- Venue: Osselle-Routelle
- Location: Besançon, France
- Date: 14 June 2025
- Organizing body: Europe Triathlon

The 2025 European Triathlon Para Championships were held on 14 June 2025 in Besançon, France, at the Osselle-Routelle venue. The event was organized by Europe Triathlon and featured elite para triathletes from across the continent competing in six classification and two sex categories.

== Background ==
Besançon has a long-standing tradition of hosting para triathlon events, with its accessible terrain and supportive infrastructure making it a preferred venue for Europe Triathlon. The 2025 edition continued the legacy of inclusive competition, offering opportunities for athletes across multiple sport classes including PTWC (wheelchair), PTS2–PTS5 (standing), and PTVI (visually impaired).

== Venue ==
The championships took place at Osselle-Routelle, a scenic location near Besançon known for its open water and flat cycling routes. The course included:

- 750 m swim in the Doubs River
- 20 km bike circuit
- 5 km run loop

All segments were adapted for para athletes, with guide support for visually impaired competitors and handcycle provisions for wheelchair athletes.

== Schedule ==
The event was held on a single day, 14 June 2025, with races starting from 09:00 local time. Classification briefings and technical meetings were conducted on 13 June.

== Participating nations ==
Athletes from over 20 European nations participated, including delegations from France, Germany, Great Britain, Spain, Italy, and the Netherlands. Each country was allowed to enter up to two athletes per classification category.

== Classification categories ==
The following sport classes were contested:

- PTWC: Wheelchair users
- PTS2–PTS5: Standing athletes with varying levels of impairment
- PTVI: Visually impaired athletes with guide runners

Each classification had separate male and female events, with medals awarded accordingly.

== Medal summary ==
* Host nation (France)

Medal table
Rank	Nation	Gold	Silver	Bronze	Total
1	Spain (ESP)	3	0	2	5
2	France (FRA)	2	4	1	7
3	Belgium (BEL)	2	0	0	2
4	Germany (GER)	1	2	1	4
5	Great Britain (GBR)	1	1	1	3
6	Individual Neutral Athletes (AIN)	1	0	2	3
7	Austria (AUT)	1	0	0	1
7	Poland (POL)	1	0	0	1
9	Portugal (POR)	0	1	0	1
9	Turkey (TUR)	0	1	0	1
9	Ukraine (UKR)	0	1	0	1
12	Ireland (IRL)	0	0	2	2
13	Norway (NOR)	0	0	1	1
Totals (13 entries)		12	10	10	32

== Medalists ==
Event	Gold	Silver	Bronze
PTS2 Men	Wim De Paepe; Belgium	Jules Ribstein; France	Vasilii Egorov; Russia
PTS2 Women	Gitte Welslau; Belgium	Neele Ludwig; Germany	Sanne Koopman; Netherlands
PTS3 Men	Henry Urand; Great Britain	Max Gelhaar; Germany	Daniel Molina; Spain
PTS3 Women	Anna Plotnikova; Russia	Elise Marc; France	Serena Banzato; Italy
PTS4 Men	Alexis Hanquinquant; France	Pierre-Antoine Baele; France	Nil Riudavets Victory; Spain
PTS4 Women	Camille Sénéclauze; France	Kübra Dere; Turkey	Ingvild Sandli Ekeland; Norway
PTS5 Men	Martin Schulz; Germany	Filipe Marques; Portugal	Tom Williamson; Ireland
PTS5 Women	Marta Dzieciątkowska; Poland	Alisa Kolpakchy; Ukraine	Irina Grazhdanova; Russia
PTVI Men	Héctor Catalá Laparra; Spain	Antoine Perel; France	Thibaut Rigaudeau; France
PTVI Women	Susana Rodriguez; Spain	Francesca Tarantello; Italy	Judith MacCombe; Ireland
PTWC Men	Thomas Frühwirth; Austria	Geert Schipper; Netherlands	Joshua Landmann; Great Britain
PTWC Women	Eva María Moral Pedrero; Spain	Melissa Nicholls; Great Britain	

== Organization and officials ==
The event was overseen by Europe Triathlon technical delegates and classifiers. Local organizing committees ensured accessibility and athlete support, including medical services and equipment logistics.
