= 2023 European Triathlon Championships =

2023 edition of the European Triathlon Championships

- Venue: Madrid, Spain
- Dates: 4 June 2023

The 2023 European Triathlon Championships, officially the 2023 Europe Triathlon Championships was the 39th edition of the European Triathlon Championships, held in Madrid, Spain, on 4 June 2023. The competition crowned the continental champions for standard or 'Olympic' distance triathlon for the 2023 season, despite being held as a duathlon due to weather conditions.

== Format ==
The competition was originally organised by Europe Triathlon over the standard Olympic triathlon distance of a 1,500 m (1,600 yd) swim, a 40 km (25 mi) cycle, and a 10 km (6.2 mi) run.

Along side the elite events, Europe Triathlon organised a full suite of amateur age-group championships in both Sprint and Standard distance. In addition, the 2023 Europe Triathlon Para Championships were also held during the festival.

Weather conditions over the weekend forced Europe Triathlon to reconfigure the events on each of the two days as a duathlon, as the swim course was considered too dangerous to proceed. The 1.5 km swim leg was replaced by an initial run less of approximately 5 km, before reverting to the 'Olympic' distances for the second and third legs.

== Medal summary ==
Event	Gold		Silver		Bronze	
Men's individual	David Castro Fajardo; Spain	1:48:13	Jonathan Brownlee; Great Britain	1:48:17	Adrien Briffod; Switzerland	1:48:27
Women's individual	Jeanne Lehair; Luxembourg	1:59:52	Lisa Tertsch; Germany	1:59:59	Cathia Schär; Switzerland	2:00:10

== Medal Table ==
* Host nation (Spain)

Rank	Nation	Gold	Silver	Bronze	Total
1	Luxembourg	1	0	0	1
1	Spain*	1	0	0	1
3	Germany	0	1	0	1
3	Great Britain	0	1	0	1
5	Switzerland	0	0	2	2
Totals (5 entries)		2	2	2	6

== Results ==
=== Men's elite ===
Rank	Athlete	Nation	Run 1	T1	Bike	T2	Run 2	Total time
1st place, gold medalist(s)	David Castro Fajardo	Spain	13:43	0:29	1:01:51	0:22	31:49	1:48:13
2nd place, silver medalist(s)	Jonathan Brownlee	Great Britain	13:29	0:26	1:01:43	0:19	32:23	1:48:17
3rd place, bronze medalist(s)	Adrien Briffod	Switzerland	13:29	0:27	1:01:41	0:18	32:34	1:48:27
4	Arnaud Mengal	Belgium	13:54	0:29	1:01:40	0:24	32:40	1:49:05
5	Emil Holm	Denmark	13:28	0:31	1:01:40	0:19	33:13	1:49:09
6	Csongor Lehmann	Hungary	13:42	0:26	1:01:47	0:24	32:59	1:49:17
7	David Cantero	Spain	13:25	0:25	1:01:49	0:19	33:33	1:49:30
8	Jonas Schomburg	Germany	13:45	0:29	1:01:44	0:23	33:22	1:49:41
9	Eric Diener	Germany	14:10	0:29	1:01:22	0:22	33:26	1:49:48
10	Noah Servais	Belgium	13:54	0:29	1:01:38	0:20	33:35	1:49:55
11	Yanis Seguin	France	13:48	0:28	1:01:40	0:21	33:50	1:50:06
12	Márk Dévay	Hungary	14:17	0:31	1:01:10	0:24	34:14	1:50:34
13	Alois Knabl	Austria	14:12	0:34	1:01:22	0:25	34:13	1:50:44
14	Valentin Morlec	France	13:48	0:29	1:01:40	0:22	34:42	1:50:58
15	Rostislav Pevtsov	Ukraine	13:43	0:31	1:01:50	0:23	34:43	1:51:09
16	Vitalii Vorontsov	Ukraine	13:27	0:31	1:02:11	0:23	34:59	1:51:28
17	Panagiotis Bitados	Greece	13:44	0:29	1:01:42	0:24	35:24	1:51:42
18	Lasse Nygaard Priester	Germany	13:26	0:28	1:02:04	0:24	35:39	1:52:00
19	Shachar Sagiv	Israel	13:28	0:29	1:01:40	0:20	36:15	1:52:10
20	Mario Mola	Spain	13:26	0:28	1:01:52	0:21	37:06	1:53:11
21	Jannik Schaufler	Germany	13:45	0:30	1:01:51	0:20	37:06	1:53:30
22	Alberto González García	Spain	13:52	0:28	1:01:40	0:21	38:38	1:54:57
23	Daniel Dixon	Great Britain	14:12	0:30	1:04:39	0:23	35:30	1:55:12
24	Fabian Meeusen	Switzerland	13:49	0:31	1:04:59	0:22	35:41	1:55:21
25	Nicola Azzano	Italy	13:44	0:31	1:04:15	0:22	36:40	1:55:30
26	Joao Mansos	Portugal	14:55	0:31	1:05:53	0:22	34:31	1:56:10
27	Sergiy Polikarpenko	Italy	13:50	0:29	1:06:30	0:24	35:36	1:56:47
28	Itamar Levanon	Israel	14:42	0:33	1:06:06	0:23	35:33	1:57:13
29	Genís Grau	Spain	13:26	0:27	1:03:23	0:55	39:24	1:57:33
30	Michał Oliwa	Poland	14:24	0:30	1:06:48	0:21	36:50	1:58:51
31	Gültigin Er	Turkey	15:15	0:33	1:06:01	0:22	37:10	1:59:19
32	Johannes Vogel	Germany	14:11	0:28	1:06:10	0:22	38:40	1:59:49
33	Artjoms Gajevskis	Latvia	15:00	0:34	1:06:01	0:21	37:58	1:59:52
34	André Dias	Portugal	14:50	0:32	1:06:14	0:23	38:16	2:00:13
35	Richard Varga	Slovakia	14:43	0:31	1:04:08	0:33	40:37	2:00:29
36	James Edgar	Ireland	13:54	0:30	1:07:22	0:24	38:51	2:00:58
37	Oscar Gladney Rundqvist	Denmark	14:45	0:32	1:05:38	0:21	41:07	2:02:21
38	Leon Pauger	Austria	15:08	0:28	1:05:42	0:22	41:13	2:02:51
39	Tomas Zikmund	Czech Republic	14:42	0:32	1:06:41	0:29	42:19	2:04:42
—	Simon Westermann	Switzerland	14:23	0:28	-	-	-	LAP
—	Antonio Serrat Seoane	Spain	13:55	0:31	-	-	-	LAP
—	Valentin Wernz	Germany	13:43	0:30	-	-	-	LAP
—	Felix Duchampt	Romania	14:17	0:34	1:01:06	0:22	-	LAP
—	Jack Willis	Great Britain	13:48	0:30	-	-	-	LAP
—	Paul Georgenthum	France						DNF
—	Ben Dijkstra	Netherlands						DNF
—	Marcin Stanglewicz	Poland						DNF
—	Alessio Crociani	Italy						DNF
—	Max Stapley	Great Britain						DNF
—	Maciej Bruździak	Poland						DNF
—	Mitch Kolkman	Netherlands						DNF
—	Miguel Tiago Silva	Portugal						DNF
—	Henry Räppo	Estonia						DNF
—	Jan Volár	Czech Republic						DNF
—	Casper Stornes	Norway						DNF
—	Itamar Eshed	Israel						DNF
—	Johannes Sikk	Estonia						DNF
—	Sebastian Wernersen	Norway						DNF
—	Igor Georgij Kozlovskij	Lithuania						DNF
—	Donald Hillebregt	Netherlands						DNF
—	Roee Zoarets	Israel						DNF
—	Peter Rojtas	Slovakia						DNF
—	Enes Kizilcik	Turkey						DNF
—	Lucas Cambresy	Luxembourg						DNF

=== Women's elite ===
Rank	Athlete	Nation	Run 1	T1	Bike	T2	Run 2	Overall time
1st place, gold medalist(s)	Jeanne Lehair	Luxembourg	15:25	0:31	1:07:26	0:22	36:08	1:59:52
2nd place, silver medalist(s)	Lisa Tertsch	Germany	15:23	0:28	1:07:29	0:21	36:18	1:59:59
3rd place, bronze medalist(s)	Cathia Schär	Switzerland	15:25	0:31	1:07:23	0:21	36:30	2:00:10
4	Tanja Neubert	Germany	15:26	0:33	1:07:21	0:22	36:52	2:00:34
5	Miriam Casillas García	Spain	15:24	0:30	1:07:27	0:21	37:11	2:00:53
6	Petra Kurikova	Czech Republic	15:23	0:32	1:07:32	0:23	37:28	2:01:18
7	Audrey Merle	France	15:26	0:32	1:07:25	0:26	37:43	2:01:32
8	Kate Waugh	Great Britain	15:30	0:32	1:08:43	0:24	36:57	2:02:06
9	Maria Tomé	Portugal	15:38	0:33	1:09:47	0:23	36:44	2:03:05
10	Claire Michel	Belgium	15:25	0:33	1:08:53	0:26	38:00	2:03:17
11	Sandra Dodet	France	15:23	0:30	1:10:13	0:26	37:27	2:03:59
12	Olivia Mathias	Great Britain	15:32	0:33	1:09:52	0:25	37:46	2:04:08
13	Sinem Francisca Tous Servera	Turkey	15:32	0:36	1:09:59	0:28	37:40	2:04:15
14	Alissa Konig	Switzerland	15:28	0:35	1:09:58	0:23	37:55	2:04:19
15	Tilda Månsson	Sweden	15:25	0:36	1:10:09	0:28	37:48	2:04:26
16	Marlene Gomez-Göggel	Germany	15:45	0:31	1:09:47	0:28	37:56	2:04:27
17	Angelica Prestia	Italy	15:37	0:32	1:10:58	0:25	36:59	2:04:31
18	Carlotta Missaglia	Italy	15:45	0:31	1:09:45	0:21	38:29	2:04:51
19	Valerie Barthelemy	Belgium	15:33	0:34	1:10:02	0:25	38:22	2:04:56
20	Mathilde Gautier	France	15:27	0:32	1:10:07	0:25	38:28	2:04:59
21	Noelia Juan	Spain	15:23	0:46	1:09:58	0:29	38:29	2:05:05
22	Luisa Iogna-Prat	Italy	15:58	0:32	1:10:40	0:27	37:38	2:05:15
23	Romana Gajdošová	Slovakia	16:11	0:30	1:10:23	0:23	38:02	2:05:29
24	Sian Rainsley	Great Britain	15:27	0:33	1:10:05	0:26	39:16	2:05:47
25	Zuzana Michalickova	Slovakia	15:58	0:33	1:10:40	0:26	38:24	2:06:01
26	Melanie Santos	Portugal	15:55	0:31	1:10:44	0:25	38:43	2:06:18
27	Jolien Vermeylen	Belgium	15:28	0:32	1:10:11	0:27	39:56	2:06:34
28	Anna Godoy Contreras	Spain	15:28	0:35	1:10:10	0:30	39:54	2:06:37
29	Nora Gmür	Switzerland	15:37	0:37	1:09:44	0:21	40:58	2:07:17
30	Sofiya Pryyma	Ukraine	16:36	0:30	1:10:01	0:26	40:03	2:07:36
31	Daisy Davies	Great Britain	15:59	0:32	1:10:41	0:24	40:07	2:07:43
32	Costanza Arpinelli	Italy	15:43	0:34	1:09:47	0:32	41:11	2:07:47
33	Tjasa Vrtacic	Slovenia	15:56	0:35	1:10:36	0:21	40:26	2:07:54
34	Natalia Castro Santos	Spain	15:58	0:34	1:10:52	0:29	40:23	2:08:16
35	Anabel Knoll	Germany	15:51	0:32	1:10:51	0:24	41:02	2:08:40
36	Hanne De Vet	Belgium	16:30	0:33	1:12:13	0:25	39:36	2:09:17
37	Kaidi Kivioja	Estonia	16:03	0:34	1:12:41	0:23	39:39	2:09:20
38	Katharina Möller	Germany	16:32	0:35	1:12:07	0:23	39:49	2:09:26
39	Noémi Sárszegi	Hungary	16:11	0:31	1:12:34	0:25	40:32	2:10:13
LAP	Barbara De Koning	Netherlands						DNF
LAP	Sophie Alden	Great Britain						DNF
LAP	Céline Kaiser	Germany						DNF
LAP	Marit Van Den Berg	Netherlands						DNF
LAP	Kseniia Levkovska	Ukraine						DNF
LAP	Iratxe Arenal Arribas	Spain						DNF
DNF	Maya Kingma	Netherlands						DNF
DNF	Tanja Stroschneider	Austria						DNF
DNF	Cecilia Santamaria Surroca	Spain						DNF
DNF	Lea Coninx	France						DNF
DNF	Marta Pintanel Raymundo	Spain						DNF
DNF	Maryna Kyryk	Ukraine						DNF
DNF	Madalena Amaral Almeida	Portugal						DNF
DNF	Dominika Peszleg	Hungary						DNF
DNS	Annika Koch	Germany						DNS
DNS	Sara Guerrero Manso	Spain						DNS

== 2023 Europe Triathlon Para Championships ==
The 2023 Europe Triathlon Para Championships took place, again in duathlon format, as part of the wider 2023 European Triathlon Championships.

Event	Gold		Silver		Bronze	
PTWC Men	Jetze Plat; Netherlands	55:29	Florian Brungraber; Austria	1:00:27	Geert Schipper; Netherlands	1:00:39
PTS2 Men	Maurits Morsink; Netherlands	1:03:34	Jules Ribstein; France	1:07:35	Gianluca Valori; Italy	1:08:10
PTS3 Men	Daniel Molina; Spain	1:07:49	Nico Van Der Burgt; Netherlands	1:08:44	Max Gelhaar; Germany	1:08:52
PTS4 Men	Alexis Hanquinquant; France	56:54	Nil Riudavets Victory; Spain	58:00	Pierre-Antoine Baele; France	58:53
PTS5 Men	Martin Schulz; Germany	54:40	Filipe Marques; Portugal	55:18	Michael Salisbury; Great Britain	56:13
PTVI Men	Antoine Perel; France	54:02	Dave Ellis; Great Britain	54:50	Thibaut Rigaudeau; France	55:54
PTWC Women	Eva María Moral Pedrero; Spain	1:12:58	Mona Francis; France	1:21:53	Rita Cuccuru; Italy	1:21:54
PTS2 Women	Cécile Saboureau; France	1:23:07	Neele Ludwig; Germany	1:33:15	Rakel Mateo Uriarte; Spain	1:39:01
PTS3 Women	Elise Marc; France	1:10:47	Sanne Koopman; Netherlands	1:30:26	Liina Nuoranne; Finland	1:34:02
PTS4 Women	Marta Francés Gómez; Spain	1:15:16	Elke Van Engelen; Germany	1:18:36	Hannah Moore; Great Britain	1:22:57
PTS5 Women	Claire Cashmore; Great Britain	1:05:09	Alisa Kolpakchy; Ukraine	1:05:27	Gwladys Lemoussu; France	1:07:35
PTVI Women	Susana Rodriguez; Spain	1:02:49	Annouck Curzillat; France	1:06:37	Francesca Tarantello; Italy	1:06:51

* Host nation (Spain)

Rank	Nation	Gold	Silver	Bronze	Total
1	France	4	3	3	10
2	Spain*	4	1	1	6
3	Netherlands	2	2	1	5
4	Germany	1	2	1	4
5	Great Britain	1	1	2	4
6	Austria	0	1	0	1
6	Portugal	0	1	0	1
6	Ukraine	0	1	0	1
9	Italy	0	0	3	3
10	Finland	0	0	1	1
Totals (10 entries)		12	12	12	36

== 2023 Europe Triathlon Age-group Championships ==
Europe Triathlon also held a full series of amateur age-group duathlons. The champions of each classification are listed below.

Sprint

Men

Classification	Champion	Time
16-19 Men Sprint	Aymeric De Springer (BEL)	50:41
20-24 Men Sprint	Ben Rawlins (GBR)	50:37
25-29 Men Sprint	Oliver Pritchard (GBR)	50:15
30-34 Men Sprint	András Czigány (HUN)	50:35
35-39 Men Sprint	Angel Salamanca Colmenarejo (ESP)	51:44
40-44 Men Sprint	Javier Cerrillo Martinez (ESP)	52:10
45-49 Men Sprint	Donald Brooks (GBR)	52:32
50-54 Men Sprint	Steven Carragher (GBR)	55:09
55-59 Men Sprint	William Didier (BEL)	57:02
60-64 Men Sprint	Paul Spowage (GBR)	58:42
65-69 Men Sprint	Juan Antonio Baena Muñoz (ESP)	1:01:21
70-74 Men Sprint	Alain Maubras (FRA)	1:06:21
75-79 Men Sprint	John Archer (GBR)	1:20:36
80-84 Men Sprint	Francisco Rodriguez Agredano (ESP)	1:37:32

Women

Classification	Champion	Time
16-19 Women Sprint	Maddie Hughes (GBR)	1:01:30
20-24 Women Sprint	Marine Moulin (BEL)	1:00:00
25-29 Women Sprint	Anna Trützschler (GER)	1:00:30
30-34 Women Sprint	Vanessa Urbanz (AUT)	1:01:22
35-39 Women Sprint	Amy Walker (GBR)	1:01:02
40-44 Women Sprint	Christine Lutsch (GBR)	1:00:25
45-49 Women Sprint	Jane Eaton (GBR)	1:01:51
50-54 Women Sprint	Vanessa Fenton (IRL)	1:02:54
55-59 Women Sprint	Jacqui Phillips (GBR)	1:03:07
60-64 Women Sprint	Claire Bloom (GBR)	1:09:02
65-69 Women Sprint	Linda Russell-Bond (GBR)	1:11:21
70-74 Women Sprint	Sue Kingston (GBR)	1:26:22
75-79 Women Sprint	Inge Stettner (GER)	1:26:55
80-84 Women Sprint	Daphne Belt (GBR)	1:54:15

Standard

Men

Classification	Champion	Time
18-19 Men	Sean Petty (GBR)	2:14:47
20-24 Men	Sebastian Fuchs (AUT)	2:01:36
25-29 Men	Téo Katgely (FRA)	2:01:37
30-34 Men	Thomas Bill (GBR)	2:03:38
35-39 Men	Neil Houlsby (GBR)	2:03:50
40-44 Men	Hendrik Becker (GER)	2:04:23
45-49 Men	Donald Brooks (GBR)	1:59:47
50-54 Men	Marcos García De Paz Fernandez (ESP)	2:08:29
55-59 Men	Juan Antonio Del Peso Alonso (ESP)	2:15:24
60-64 Men	Christopher Doyle (LUX)	2:25:16
65-69 Men	Denis Pierrat (FRA)	2:25:56
70-74 Men	Barry Jameson (GBR)	2:41:50
75-79 Men	David Davidson (GBR)	3:03:03
80-84 Men	Gherardo Mercati (ITA)	4:10:33

Women

Classification	Champion	Time
20-24 Women	Naoise O'Donnell (IRL)	2:47:50
25-29 Women	Megan Chapple (GBR)	2:15:55
30-34 Women	Courtney Hyde (GBR)	2:23:29
35-39 Women	Anna Pfoser (AUT)	2:28:05
40-44 Women	Ana Caleya Santiago (ESP)	2:26:35
45-49 Women	Laura Villar Palacios (ESP)	2:25:32
50-54 Women	Yolanda Mir Cuñat (ESP)	2:26:45
55-59 Women	Nicki Rushton (GBR)	2:34:59
60-64 Women	Hilary Briggs (GBR)	2:39:18
65-69 Women	Linda Russell-Bond (GBR)	2:50:19
70-74 Women	Lesley Kernaghan (GBR)	3:18:36
75-79 Women	Linda Clarkson (GBR)	3:38:45

Champions per nation

Rank	Nation	Champions
1	Great Britain (GBR)	28
2	Spain (ESP)	9
3	Austria (AUT)	3
3	Belgium (BEL)	3
3	France (FRA)	3
3	Germany (GER)	3
7	Ireland (IRL)	2
8	Hungary (HUN)	1
8	Italy (ITA)	1
8	Luxembourg (LUX)	1
Total (10 nations)		54
