= 2024 World Triathlon Championship Series =

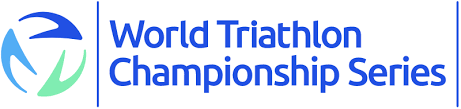
- League: World Triathlon Championship Series
- Sport: Triathlon

Men's Series
- Series Champion: Alex Yee (United Kingdom)
- Points: 4069.53 pts

Women's Series
- Series Champion: Cassandre Beaugrand (France)
- Points: 4000.00 pts

World Triathlon Championship Series seasons
- 2023 2025

The 2024 World Triathlon Championship Series was the 16th season of the World Triathlon Championship Series, the top level international series for triathlon, since its establishment in 2009, and crowned the 36th official World Triathlon Champion for both men and women since the first was crowned in 1989.

The season originally consisted of seven pairs of triathlon races for both a men's and women's competition, beginning on 3 May in Abu Dhabi, and concluding on 20 October with the grand final in Torremolinos; however the opening race was cancelled due to extreme weather conditions. A further race in Montreal was cancelled for water quality leaving five series events.

The World Champion is decided on a cumulative points basis, with the sum of their three best points scores, plus their score in Torremolinos, deciding the series rankings, medallists and champions. As it was an Olympic year, and in light of the cancellation of two Series events, the individual races at the 2024 Summer Olympics were treated as a sixth WTCS race for the purposes of ranking points. In addition, points were available on a reduced scale (75% of a standard Series race) for each of the continental championships.

The Grand Final incorporated the 2024 World Triathlon Para Championships, as well as a number of amateur age-grade championships

== Championship Series summary (elite) ==
=== Men ===
Event	Gold	Silver	Bronze
World Triathlon Championship Series Events
Abu Dhabi	Event cancelled		
Yokohama	Morgan Pearson (USA)	Matthew Hauser (AUS)	Luke Willian (AUS)
Cagliari	Alex Yee (GBR)	Hayden Wilde (NZL)	Csongor Lehmann (HUN)
Hamburg	Matthew Hauser (AUS)	Vasco Vilaça (POR)	Pierre Le Corre (FRA)
Montreal	Event cancelled		
Weihai	Alex Yee (GBR)	Léo Bergère (FRA)	Miguel Hidalgo (BRA)
Torremolinos^{Grand Final}	Hayden Wilde (NZL)	Léo Bergère (FRA)	Alex Yee (GBR)
Non-Series events counting towards final Championship totals
2024 Olympics Games
Men's individual (France) Paris	Alex Yee (GBR)	Hayden Wilde (NZL)	Léo Bergère (FRA)
Continental championships
Africa (Egypt) Hurghada	Merwann Abassi (MAR)	Mohamed Nemsi (MAR)	Zakaria Chtioui (TUN)
Americas (United States) Miami	Morgan Pearson (USA)	Darr Smith (USA)	John Reed (USA)
Asia (Japan) Hatsukaichi	Kenji Nener (JPN)	Takumi Hojo (JPN)	Jenje Fan (CHN)
Europe (France) Vichy	Csongor Lehmann (HUN)	Yanis Seguin (FRA)	Casper Stornes (NOR)
Oceania (New Zealand) Taupō	Matthew Hauser (AUS)	Tayler Reid (NZL)	Brandon Copeland (AUS)
Overall^{World Championship}	Alex Yee (GBR)	Léo Bergère (FRA)	Hayden Wilde (NZL)

=== Women ===
Event	Gold	Silver	Bronze
Abu Dhabi	Event cancelled		
Yokohama	Léonie Périault (FRA)	Taylor Knibb (USA)	Emma Lombardi (FRA)
Cagliari	Cassandre Beaugrand (FRA)	Lisa Tertsch (GER)	Beth Potter (GBR)
Hamburg	Cassandre Beaugrand (FRA)	Lisa Tertsch (GER)	Beth Potter (GBR)
Montreal	Event cancelled		
Weihai	Lisa Tertsch (GER)	Beth Potter (GBR)	Georgia Taylor-Brown (GBR)
Torremolinos^{Grand Final}	Cassandre Beaugrand (FRA)	Beth Potter (GBR)	Emma Lombardi (FRA)
Non-Series events counting towards final Championship totals
2024 Summer Olympics
Women's individual (France) Paris	Cassandre Beaugrand (FRA)	Julie Derron (SUI)	Beth Potter (GBR)
Continental championships
Africa (Egypt) Hurghada	Vicky van der Merwe (RSA)	Andie Kuipers (ZIM)	Julie Staub (MRI)
Americas (United States) Miami	Elizabeth Bravo (ECU)	Luisa Baca Vargas (MEX)	Sofia Rodriguez (MEX)
Asia (Japan) Hatsukaichi	Yuko Takahashi (JPN)	Xinyu Lin (CHN)	Yifan Yang (CHN)
Europe (France) Vichy	Vicky Holland (GBR)	Leonie Periault (FRA)	Alice Betto (ITA)
Oceania (New Zealand) Taupō	Ellie Hoitink (AUS)	Richelle Hill (AUS)	Ainsley Thorpe (NZL)
Overall^{World Championship}	Cassandre Beaugrand (FRA)	Beth Potter (GBR)	Emma Lombardi (FRA)

== Race results ==
=== Women ===
Yokohama

Rank	Athlete	Nation	Time
1	Leonie Periault	(France)	01:52:28
2	Taylor Knibb	(United States)	01:53:04
3	Emma Lombardi	(France)	01:53:08
4	Taylor Spivey	(United States)	01:53:25
5	Kirsten Kasper	(United States)	01:53:34
6	Anna Godoy Contreras	(Spain)	01:53:35
7	Flora Duffy	(Bermuda)	01:53:38
8	Djenyfer Arnold	(Brazil)	01:53:43
9	Laura Lindemann	(Germany)	01:54:00

Calgiari

Rank	Athlete	Nation	Time
1	Cassandre Beaugrand	(France)	01:47:25
2	Lisa Tertsch	(Germany)	01:47:28
3	Beth Potter	(United Kingdom)	01:47:31
4	Emma Lombardi	(France)	01:47:32
5	Jeanne Lehair	(Luxembourg)	01:47:51
6	Georgia Taylor-Brown	(United Kingdom)	01:48:03
7	Sophie Coldwell	(United Kingdom)	01:48:06
8	Flora Duffy	(Bermuda)	01:48:08
9	Nina Eim	(Germany)	01:48:13

Hamburg

Rank	Athlete	Nation	Time
1	Cassandre Beaugrand	(France)	00:55:19
2	Lisa Tertsch	(Germany)	00:55:30
3	Beth Potter	(United Kingdom)	00:55:31
4	Jeanne Lehair	(Luxembourg)	00:55:33
5	Emma Lombardi	(France)	00:55:35
6	Annika Koch	(Germany)	00:55:45
7	Kate Waugh	(United Kingdom)	00:55:48
8	Cathia Schär	(Switzerland)	00:56:00
9	Rachel Klamer	(Netherlands)	00:56:12

Weihai

Rank	Athlete	Nation	Time
1	Lisa Tertsch	(Germany)	02:04:42
2	Beth Potter	(United Kingdom)	02:04:59
3	Georgia Taylor-Brown	(United Kingdom)	02:05:40
4	Tanja Neubert	(Germany)	02:05:55
5	Kate Waugh	(United Kingdom)	02:06:00
6	Gwen Jorgensen	(United States)	02:06:08
7	Rosa Maria Tapia Vidal	(Mexico)	02:06:17
8	Gina Sereno	(United States)	02:06:26
9	Alice Betto	(Italy)	02:06:34

Torremolinos (Grand final)

Rank	Athlete	Nation	Time
1	Cassandre Beaugrand	(France)	01:56:44
2	Beth Potter	(United Kingdom)	01:57:22
3	Emma Lombardi	(France)	01:57:34
4	Vicky Holland	(United Kingdom)	01:57:56
5	Miriam Casillas García	(Spain)	01:58:02
6	Jeanne Lehair	(Luxembourg)	01:58:09
7	Lisa Tertsch	(Germany)	01:58:12
8	Bianca Seregni	(Italy)	01:58:19
9	Leonie Periault	(France)	01:58:28
10	Kirsten Kasper	(United States)	01:58:35
11	Rosa Maria Tapia Vidal	(Mexico)	01:58:47
12	Gwen Jorgensen	(United States)	01:59:19
13	Tanja Neubert	(Germany)	01:59:22
14	Olivia Mathias	(United Kingdom)	01:59:31
15	Claire Michel	(Belgium)	01:59:34
16	Jessica Fullagar	(United Kingdom)	01:59:36
17	Alice Betto	(Italy)	01:59:46
18	Anna Godoy Contreras	(Spain)	01:59:51
19	Kate Waugh	(United Kingdom)	01:59:52
20	Roksana Slupek	(Poland)	01:59:55

=== Men ===
Yokohama

Rank	Athlete	Nation	Time
1	Morgan Pearson	(United States)	01:42:05
2	Matthew Hauser	(Australia)	01:42:12
3	Luke Willian	(Australia)	01:42:20
4	Léo Bergere	(France)	01:42:26
5	Charles Paquet	(Canada)	01:42:30
6	Marten Van Riel	(Belgium)	01:42:34
7	Kenji Nener	(Japan)	01:42:36
8	Miguel Hidalgo	(Brazil)	01:42:38
9	Vincent Luis	(France)	01:42:40

Calgiari

Rank	Athlete	Nation	Time
1	Alex Yee	(United Kingdom)	01:39:44
2	Hayden Wilde	(New Zealand)	01:39:46
3	Csongor Lehmann	(Hungary)	01:40:27
4	Vetle Bergsvik Thorn	(Norway)	01:40:36
5	Ricardo Batista	(Portugal)	01:40:37
6	Pierre Le Corre	(France)	01:40:39
7	Charles Paquet	(Canada)	01:40:43
8	Luke Willian	(Australia)	01:40:50
9	Vincent Luis	(France)	01:40:57

Hamburg

Rank	Athlete	Nation	Time
1	Matthew Hauser	(Australia)	00:50:03
2	Vasco Vilaca	(Portugal)	00:50:09
3	Pierre Le Corre	(France)	00:50:10
4	Jelle Geens	(Belgium)	00:50:18
5	Casper Stornes	(Norway)	00:50:19
6	Vincent Luis	(France)	00:50:23
7	Alessio Crociani	(Italy)	00:50:28
8	Alberto Gonzalez	(Spain)	00:50:38
9	Max Stapley	(United Kingdom)	00:50:39

Weihai

Rank	Athlete	Nation	Time
1	Alex Yee	(United Kingdom)	01:48:21
2	Léo Bergere	(France)	01:49:07
3	Miguel Hidalgo	(Brazil)	01:49:18
4	Alberto Gonzalez	(Spain)	01:49:47
5	Vincent Luis	(France)	01:49:52
6	Luke Willian	(Australia)	01:49:58
7	Hayden Wilde	(New Zealand)	01:50:01
8	Dylan McCullough	(New Zealand)	01:50:03
9	Jack Willis	(United Kingdom)	01:50:18

Torremolinos (Grand final)

Rank	Athlete	Nation	Time
1	Hayden Wilde	(New Zealand)	01:42:22
2	Léo Bergere	(France)	01:43:24
3	Alex Yee	(United Kingdom)	01:43:50
4	Dorian Coninx	(France)	01:44:03
5	Pierre Le Corre	(France)	01:44:04
6	Csongor Lehmann	(Hungary)	01:44:08
7	Tayler Reid	(New Zealand)	01:44:12
8	Vincent Luis	(France)	01:44:22
9	Tyler Mislawchuk	(Canada)	01:44:26
10	Hugo Milner	(United Kingdom)	01:44:31
11	Simon Westermann	(Switzerland)	01:44:38
12	Vetle Bergsvik Thorn	(Norway)	01:44:44
13	Sergio Baxter Cabrera	(Spain)	01:44:59
14	Kenji Nener	(Japan)	01:45:00
15	Luke Willian	(Australia)	01:45:04
16	Morgan Pearson	(United States)	01:45:08
17	Antonio Serrat Seoane	(Spain)	01:45:13
18	Connor Bentley	(United Kingdom)	01:45:17
19	Alberto Gonzalez	(Spain)	01:45:20
20	Miguel Hidalgo	(Brazil)	01:45:36

== Final result totals ==
Women
After Grand Final, 19 October 2024 - Final scores.

Rank	Athlete	Nation	Points
1	Cassandre Beaugrand	France (FRA)	4000.00
2	Beth Potter	Great Britain (GBR)	3792.51
3	Emma Lombardi	France (FRA)	3508.06
4	Lisa Tertsch	Germany (GER)	3401.75
5	Jeanne Lehair	Luxembourg (LUX)	2667.92
6	Georgia Taylor-Brown	Great Britain (GBR)	2472.88
7	Leonie Periault	France (FRA)	2389.56
8	Kate Waugh	Great Britain (GBR)	2030.84
9	Flora Duffy	Bermuda (BER)	1937.91
10	Vicky Holland	Great Britain (GBR)	1905.03
11	Kirsten Kasper	United States (USA)	1849.36
12	Alice Betto	Italy (ITA)	1717.25
13	Rosa Maria Tapia Vidal	Mexico (MEX)	1711.12
14	Taylor Knibb	United States (USA)	1629.36
15	Taylor Spivey	United States (USA)	1622.94
16	Anna Godoy Contreras	Spain (ESP)	1614.73
17	Gwen Jorgensen	United States (USA)	1605.05
18	Bianca Seregni	Italy (ITA)	1576.88
19	Miriam Casillas García	Spain (ESP)	1493.05
20	Claire Michel	Belgium (BEL)	1444.40

Men
After Grand Final, 20 October 2024 - Final scores.

Rank	Athlete	Nation	Points
1	Alex Yee	Great Britain (GBR)	4069.53
2	Léo Bergere	France (FRA)	3728.33
3	Hayden Wilde	New Zealand (NZL)	3726.40
4	Pierre Le Corre	France (FRA)	3025.48
5	Csongor Lehmann	Hungary (HUN)	2810.69
6	Luke Willian	Australia (AUS)	2531.90
7	Vincent Luis	France (FRA)	2528.28
8	Matthew Hauser	Australia (AUS)	2301.40
9	Miguel Hidalgo	Brazil (BRA)	2215.00
10	Alberto Gonzalez Garcia	Spain (ESP)	2136.68
11	Morgan Pearson	United States (USA)	2108.13
12	Vetle Bergsvik Thorn	Norway (NOR)	2033.14
13	Kenji Nener	Japan (JPN)	1960.81
14	Tayler Reid	New Zealand (NZL)	1797.53
15	Vasco Vilaça	Portugal (POR)	1765.62
16	Charles Paquet	Canada (CAN)	1750.86
17	Hugo Milner	Great Britain (GBR)	1580.27
18	Tyler Mislawchuk	Canada (CAN)	1500.19
19	Ricardo Batista	Portugal (POR)	1498.49
20	Antonio Serrat Seoane	Spain (ESP)	1404.55

== Mixed relay ==
Event	Gold	Silver	Bronze
Abu Dhabi	Event cancelled		
Montreal	Event cancelled		
Hamburg; 2024 World Mixed Relay Championship	Germany Henry Graf; Lisa Tertsch; Lasse Lührs; Annika Koch	Switzerland Max Studer; Julie Derron; Simon Westermann; Cathia Schär	New Zealand Tayler Reid; Ainsley Thorpe; Dylan McCullough; Nicole van der Kaay

== List of 2024 World Championship podiums ==
The following is a list of all the World Championship medalists crowned on the various legs of the World Triathlon Championship series. While the men and women's elite championships were decided over the full series, Mixed Relay, Under-23, and Junior World Championships were all decided by single races on the Torremolinos grand final. The World Triathlon Sprint Championships were cancelled this season.

Event	Gold	Silver	Bronze
Senior
Men's overall season-long	Alex Yee (GBR)	Léo Bergère (FRA)	Hayden Wilde (NZL)
Women's overall season-long	Cassandre Beaugrand (FRA)	Beth Potter (GBR)	Emma Lombardi (FRA)
Mixed relay	Germany Henry Graf; Lisa Tertsch; Lasse Lührs; Annika Koch	Switzerland Max Studer; Julie Derron; Simon Westermann; Cathia Schär	New Zealand Tayler Reid; Ainsley Thorpe; Dylan McCullough; Nicole van der Kaay
Men's Sprint	not held		
Women's Sprint	not held		
Age-grade
Men's U-23	David Cantero Del Campo; Spain	Panagiotis Bitados; Greece	Gergely Kiss; Hungary
Women's U-23	Karolina Helga Horváth; Hungary	Zuzana Michaličková; Slovakia	Maria Tomé; Portugal
Men's junior	Nils Serre Gehri; France	Reese Vannerson; United States	Achille Besson; France
Women's junior	Ambre Grasset; France	Fanni Szalai; Hungary	Léa Houart; France
Mixed relay U-23/Jr	France; Nils Serre Gehri; Candice Denizot; Jules Rethoret; Emma Lombardi	Germany; Jan Diener; Julia Bröcker; Henry Graf; Jule Behrens	Hungary; Gergely Kiss; Márta Kropkó; Gergő Dobi; Fanni Szalai

== World Triathlon Para Championships ==
2024 World Triathlon Para Championships
- League: World Triathlon Para Championships
- Sport: Paratriathlon

Men's Series
- World Champions: PTWC : Jetze Plat; PTS2 : Wim De Paepe; PTS3 : Henry Urand; PTS4 : Alexis Hanquinquant; PTS5 : Stefan Daniel; PTVI : Dave Ellis

Women's Series
- World Champions: PTWC : Kendall Gretsch; PTS2 : Allysa Seely; PTS3 : Elise Marc; PTS4 : Marta Francés; PTS5 : Grace Norman; PTVI : Susana Rodriguez

Open mixed relay
- World Champions: United States (USA)

World Triathlon Para Championship seasons
- 2023 2025

The World Triathlon Championships Series Grand Final also hosted the 2024 World Triathlon Para Championships, a series of single event championship races to crown world champions from para-triathlon on 18 October 2024. Events were held 12 classifications, one more than at the 2024 Summer Paralympics, as the women's PTS2 and PTS3 classes were completed separately, not as a combined classification.

=== Medalists ===
Event	Gold	Silver	Bronze
Men's PTWC	Jetze Plat; Netherlands	Florian Brungraber; Austria	Thomas Fruehwirth; Austria
Men's PTS2	Wim De Paepe; Belgium	Vasilii Egirov; Neutral Paralympic Athletes	Lionel Morales; Spain
Men's PTS3	Henry Urand; Great Britain	Daniel Molina; Spain	Max Gelhaar; Germany
Men's PTS4	Alexis Hanquinquant; France	Nil Riudavets; Spain	Pierre-Antoine Baele; France
Men's PTS5	Stefan Daniel; Canada	Jack Howell; Australia	Filipe Marques; Portugal
Men's PTVI	Dave Ellis; Great Britain	Thibaut Rigaudeau; France	Antoine Perel; France
Women's PTWC	Kendall Gretsch; United States	Jéssica Messali; Brazil	Lauren Parker; Australia
Women's PTS2	Allysa Seely; United States	Emma Rodríguez; Venezuela	Yukako Hata; Japan
Women's PTS3	Elise Marc; France	Sanne Koopman; Netherlands	Liina Nuoranne; Finland
Women's PTS4	Marta Francés; Spain	Camila Seneclauze; France	Sally Pilbeam; Australia
Women's PTS5	Grace Norman; United States	Claire Cashmore; Great Britain	Lauren Steadman; Great Britain
Women's PTVI	Susana Rodriguez; Spain	Francesca Tarantello; Italy	Letícia Freitas; Brazil
Open mixed PT relay	United States; Kendall Gretsch; Carson Clough; Grace Norman	Great Britain; Joshua Landmann; Claire Cashmore; Megan Richter; Dave Ellis	Spain; Eva María Moral Pedrero; Jairo Ruiz Lopez; Susana Rodríguez; Nil Riudavets

=== Medal table ===
* Host nation (Spain)

Rank	Nation	Gold	Silver	Bronze	Total
1	United States	4	0	0	4
2	France	2	2	2	6
2	Spain*	2	2	2	6
4	Great Britain	2	2	1	5
5	Netherlands	1	1	0	2
6	Belgium	1	0	0	1
6	Canada	1	0	0	1
8	Austria	0	1	2	3
9	Australia	0	1	1	2
9	Brazil	0	1	1	2
11	Italy	0	1	0	1
11	Venezuela	0	1	0	1
–	Neutral Paralympic Athletes	0	1	0	1
13	Finland	0	0	1	1
13	Germany	0	0	1	1
13	Japan	0	0	1	1
13	Portugal	0	0	1	1
Totals (16 entries)		13	13	13	39
