= Louis Noël (paratriathlete) =

French paratriathlete (born 1997)

Personal information
- Born: 15 August 1997 (age 28) Calais, France

Sport
- Sport: Paratriathlon
- Disability class: PTWC
- Club: Côte d'Opale Triathlon
Medal record
Mmen's paratriathlon
Representing France
World Championships
Bronze medal – third place	2025 Wollongong	PTWC
European Championships
Bronze medal – third place	2024 Vichy	PTWC

Louis Noël (born 15 August 1997) is a French paratriathlete. He represented France at the 2024 Summer Paralympics.

== Career ==
In September 2024, he represented France at the 2024 Summer Paralympics and finished in fourth place in the PTWC event with a time of 1:03:40. He then competed at the 2024 European Triathlon Championships and won a bronze medal in the PTWC event with a time of 59:11.

In October 2025, he competed at the 2025 World Triathlon Para Championships and won a bronze medal in the PTWC event.

== Personal life ==
Noël was born without legs. He works as an engineer at a railway management and safety company.
