= Serena Banzato =

Italian paratriathlete (born 1984)

Personal information
- Born: 29 December 1984 (age 41) Padua, Italy

Sport
- Country: Italy
- Sport: Paratriathlon
Medal record
Paratriathlon
Representing Italy
World Championships
Gold medal – first place	2026 Pontevedra	PTS3
European Championships
Gold medal – first place	2026 Tarragona	PTS3
Bronze medal – third place	2025 Besançon	PTS3

Serena Banzato (born 29 December 1984) is an Italian psychotherapist and paratriathlete.

An Italian champion in paratriathlon and Paralympic track athletics, she has represented Italy in international competitions since 2023, achieving podium finishes at major European and world events. She is the author of the bestselling book, Cammina, vivi, amati (Piemme, 2024).

In 2023, she set the Italian record in the 100m Paralympic category T64.

As of 2026, in the paratriathlon world ranking for the female PTS4 category, Banzato is 15th in the world.

In 2026, she also won the title of Italian para aquathlon champion in the PTS3 category, winning the Italian Championships held in Lignano Sabbiadoro, as well as the European paratriathlon title in the PTS3 category, a round in the World Triathlon Para Series in Hamburg and the World Triathlon Para Championships.

== Personal life ==
In 2018, following a serious infection contracted after a trip on the Camino de Santiago, Banzato risked her life and the amputation of a leg. She underwent eleven surgeries and a long rehabilitation process.

Banzato told her story in several national media, including Da noi... a ruota libera with Francesca Fialdini on Rai 1 and Che tempo che fa with Fabio Fazio.

Banzato also recounted her experience of illness and rebirth in an interview given to Vanity Fair on the occasion of the publication of her second book Tu sei un capolavoro (Sperling & Kupfer, 2025). In this interview she specified that in 2018, while walking along a stretch of the Northern Way towards Santiago de Compostela, Banzato contracted necrotizing fasciitis, a serious bacterial infection that was potentially lethal. This condition required numerous surgical interventions to save her life and safeguard the affected limb.

Banzato works as a clinical psychologist, sports psychologist and psychotherapist, supporting people in difficulty and collaborating with national sports federations and in school and social projects.

Banzato lives in the province of Padua and is the mother of two children.

== Athletic career ==
A member of the Woman Triathlon company, Banzato competes in the PTS3–PTS4 classes depending on the classifications of the period.

Banzato won the gold medal in the 100 metres T44 category at the 2021 Italian Paralympic Championships. In 2023, she set the Italian record in the 100 metres Paralympic category T64. She then competed in the Italian Paratriathlon Championships again and won in 2023 and 2024 in Loano, She also competed in the Italian Championships in 2025 in Comacchio and San Benedetto del Tronto and won both races. She won the Italian Paraduathlon Championships in 2023–2024, a feat she repeated in 2026, both in Imola.

On 7 June 2025, Banzato competed in the World Triathlon Para Series Taranto and finished in second place, marking her first podium at an international event. She then competed in Europe Triathlon Para Championships held in Besançon, where she won a bronze medal. She then won the World Triathlon Para Cup races held in Alhandra and Alanya.

In June 2026, Banzato competed in the Europe Triathlon Para Championships and won the gold medal. The following month, she won the World Triathlon Para Series race in Hamburg. In September, she competed in the World Triathlon Para Championships held in Pontevedra and won the gold medal.

== Other works ==
With Cammina, vivi, amati. Pillole per ripartire un passo alla volta (Piemme, 2024), Banzato recounts the journey of physical and psychological recovery, proposing informative tools inspired by sports psychology and resilience. The book is structured in three sections — *Walk*, *Live*, *Love* — and uses metaphors such as the "bag of stones" to stimulate emotional reflection and personal resilience. The volume was presented in numerous Italian cities, including Rovigo, Catanzaro and Acqui Terme, and was also included in the cultural highlights of the daily newspaper Il Sole 24 Ore.

In 2025, Banzato wrote her second book Tu sei un capolavoro. Piccoli passi per imparare a volersi bene (Piemme, 2025), selected by Il Giornale among the proposals on the occasion of the World Mental Health Day, promoting psychological well-being.

== Bibliography ==
- Cammina, vivi, amati. Pillole per ripartire un passo alla volta, Milan, Piemme, 2024, ISBN 978-88-566-9214-3.
- Tu sei un capolavoro. Piccoli passi per imparare a volersi bene, Milan, Piemme, 2025, ISBN 978-88-200-8168-3.
