= Dave Ellis (paratriathlete) =

British paratriathlete (born 1986)

Dave Ellis MBE
Personal information
- Born: 12 July 1986 (age 40) Derby, Derbyshire, England

Sport
- Country: United Kingdom
- Sport: Paratriathlon
Medal record
Men's paratriathlon
Representing Great Britain
Paralympic Games
| Gold medal – first place | 2024 Paris | PTVI |
World Championships
| Gold medal – first place | 2013 London | TRI 6b |
| Gold medal – first place | 2017 Rotterdam | PTVI |
| Gold medal – first place | 2018 Gold Coast | PTVI |
| Gold medal – first place | 2021 Abu Dhabi | PTVI |
| Gold medal – first place | 2022 Abu Dhabi | PTVI |
| Gold medal – first place | 2023 Ponteverde | PTVI |
| Gold medal – first place | 2024 Torremolinos | PTVI |
| Gold medal – first place | 2025 Wollongong | PTVI |
| Gold medal – first place | 2026 Pontverde | PTVI |
| Silver medal – second place | 2019 Lausanne | PTVI |
| Silver medal – second place | 2024 Torremolinos | Mixed relay |
European Championships
| Gold medal – first place | 2013 Alanya | TRI 6b |
| Gold medal – first place | 2018 Tartu | PTVI |
| Gold medal – first place | 2021 Valencia | PTVI |
| Gold medal – first place | 2022 Olsztyn | PTVI |
| Gold medal – first place | 2024 Vichy | PTVI |
| Silver medal – second place | 2014 Kitzbühel | PT5 |
| Silver medal – second place | 2023 Madrid | PTVI |
Representing England
Commonwealth Games
| Gold medal – first place | 2022 Birmingham | PTVI |

David Steven Ellis (born 12 July 1986) is a British paratriathlete. He won the gold medal in the men's PTVI event at the 2024 Summer Paralympics.
