= Mohamed Islam Bouglia =

Tunisian patriathlete (born 1997)

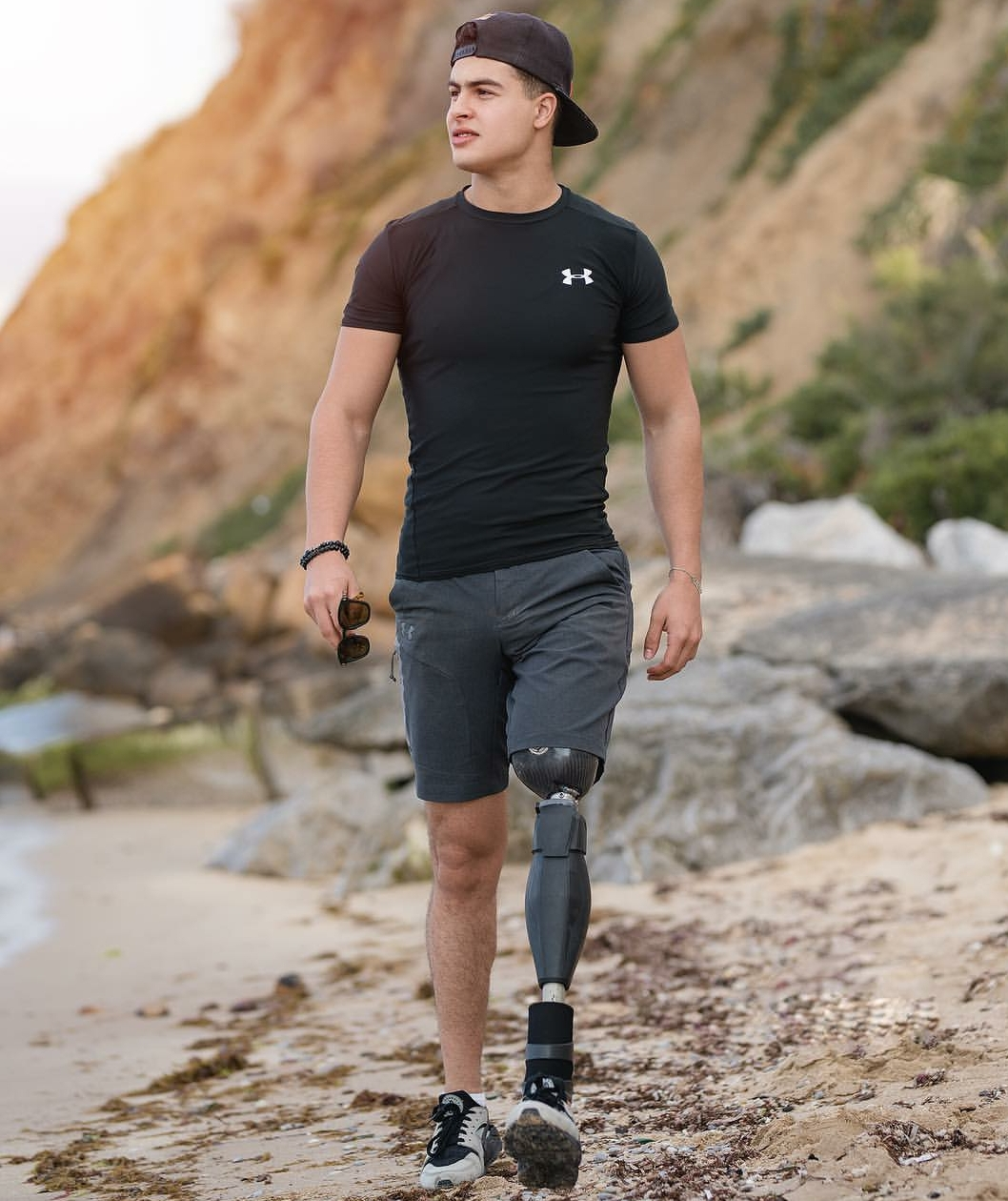
- Mohamed Islam Bouglia 2018

Personal information
- Born: 26 July 1997 (age 28)

Sport
- Sport: Paratriathlon; Cycling
Medal record
Men's paratriathlon
Representing Tunisia
Parariathlon African Championships
Gold medal – first place	2018 Rabat	PT2 Men
Gold medal – first place	2017 Yasmine Hammamet	PT2 Men

Mohamed Islam Bouglia or Mohamed Islem Bouglia also spelled Med Islam Bouglia (Arabic: محمد إسلام بوقلية, born July 26, 1997, in Tunis) is a Tunisian cyclist who became paratriathlete following a road accident. He is African champion of paratriathlon PT2 in 2017 and 2018. He has several national and Arab championships to his credit, in the minimal and junior categories.

== Biography ==
Born July 26, 1997, in Tunis, is a Tunisian cyclist who became a paratriathlon following a road accident. He is double African champion of paratriathlon in the PT2 category (2017 and 2018).

Mohamed Islam Bouglia is part of the national cycling team in Tunisia and has several national and Arab championships to his credit, in the minimal and junior categories. He was also second in the Arabian championship of Manama (Bahrain) in 2013 and participated in world competitions.

Mohamed Islam Bouglia is the son of actor and humorist Chawki Bouglia.

On October 29, 2015, Mohamed Islam Bouglia was visited by Maher Ben Dhia while he was hospitalized in a clinic and was financially supported by the ministry to undergo surgery.

Mohamed Islem has become a symbol of courage and determination in Tunisia.

== Prize list ==
- 2018 Rabat ATU Triathlon African Championships and YOG Qualifier (PT2) Rabat, Morocco 1st place
- 2017 Yasmine Hammamet ATU Triathlon African Championships (PT2) Yasmine Hammamet, Tunisia 1st place
