= Lazar Filipović =

Serbian paratriathlete (born 1990)

Personal information
- Born: 9 February 1990 (age 36) Čačak, Serbia

Sport
- Sport: Paratriathlon
- Disability: Vision impairment
- Disability class: PTVI
Medal record
Representing Serbia
Men's paratriathlon
World Championships
Silver medal – second place	2026 Pontevedra	PTVI
Bronze medal – third place	2025 Wollongong	PTVI
Men's para-aquathlon
World Championships
Silver medal – second place	2025 Pontevedra	PTVI

Lazar Filipović (born 9 February 1990) is a Serbian visually impaired paratriathlete. He represented Serbia at the 2024 Summer Paralympics.

== Career ==
Filipović represented Serbia at the 2024 Summer Paralympics in the PTVI paratriathlon and finished in tenth place with a time of 1:03:39. He became the first person from Čačak to participate in the Paralympic Games and the first Serbian competitor in the paratriathlon. In October 2025, he competed at the 2025 World Triathlon Para Championships and won a bronze medal in the PTVI event.
