= Henry Urand =

British paralympic triathlete (born 2002)

Personal information
- Born: 31 August 2002 (age 24) Ashford, Kent, England

Sport
- Country: United Kingdom
- Sport: Paratriathlon
Medal record
Paratriathlon
Representing United Kingdom
World Championships
Gold medal – first place	2024 Torremolinos	PTS3
Gold medal – first place	2025 Wollongong	PTS3
Gold medal – first place	2026 Pontevedra	PTS3
European Championships
Gold medal – first place	2025 Besançon	PTS3
Bronze medal – third place	2024 Vichy	PTS3

Henry Urand (born 31 August 2002) is a British paralympic triathlete who competes in the PTS3 category. He is a three-time gold medalist at the World Championships and a two-time medalist at the European Championships. He also competed at the 2024 Summer Paralympics.

== Early life ==
Urand was born on 31 August 2002, having had cerebral palsy from birth. When he was a teenager, he injured his knee playing football in school, requiring him to undergo surgery to repair it. Around this time, he stayed fit by running, but then found himself unable to run even thought his knee had recovered. As part of his rehabilitation, Urand would take up cycling.

== Career ==
Urand started cycling in September 2019. In March 2023, he switched to triathlon.

Urand was one of ten triathletes who earned quota places for Great Britain in paratriathlon at the 2024 Summer Paralympics in Paris. In September 2024, representing his country at the afformentioned Paralympics, he finished in fourth place in the PTS3 event. Later that month he competed in the European Triathlon Championships and won a bronze medal. In October, he competed in the World Triathlon Para Championships, where he won the gold medal.

In October 2025, Urand competed in the World Triathlon Para Championships, where he won the gold medal in the PTS3 event. In September 2026, he competed in the World Triathlon Para Championships held in Pontevedra and won the gold medal.
