= Triathlon at the 2024 Summer Paralympics – Men's PTVI =

Men's PTVI at the XVII Paralympic Games
- Venue: Pont Alexandre III
- Dates: 2 September 2024
- Competitors: 12 from 8 nations

Medalists
1st place, gold medalist(s)		Dave Ellis	Great Britain
2nd place, silver medalist(s)		Thibaut Rigaudeau	France
3rd place, bronze medalist(s)		Antoine Perel	France

The Triathlon at the 2024 Summer Paralympics – Men's PTVI event at the 2024 Paralympic Games took place at 07:15 CET on 2 September 2024 at Pont Alexandre III, Paris.

== Venue ==
The triathlon course will start from Pont Alexandre III bridge near Seine River and will end at the same place. The event will be over sprint distance. There will be 750 metre Swim through Seine River, 20 km tandem para cycling at Champs-Élysées, Avenue Montaigne, crossing the Seine by the Pont des Invalides and reaching the Quai d'Orsay and last leg of 5 km run will end at Pont Alexandre III bridge.

== Results ==
Rank	Athlete	Nationality	c.t.	Swim	T1	Bike	T2	Run	Total Time	Notes
1st place, gold medalist(s)	Dave Ellis; Guide:Luke Pollard	Great Britain	+2:41	12:51	0:51	28:11	0:30	16:18	58:41	
2nd place, silver medalist(s)	Thibaut Rigaudeau; Guide:Cyril Viennot	France	+2:41	13:38	0:41	27:37	0:32	17:37	1:00:05	
3rd place, bronze medalist(s)	Antoine Perel; Guide:Yohan le Berre	France		12:44	0:52	28:15	0:32	18:02	1:00:25	
4	Owen Cravens; Guide:Ben Hoffman	United States	+2:41	13:31	0:53	27:27	0:33	18:19	1:00:43	
5	Sam Harding; Guide:Aaron Royle	Australia	+2:41	13:40	0:58	29:19	0:34	16:50	1:01:21	
6	Łukasz Wietecki; Guide:Jacek Krawczyk	Poland	+2:41	14:57	0:47	28:07	0:31	17:07	1:01:29	
7	Oscar Kelly; Guide:Charlie Harding	Great Britain	+2:41	13:34	0:49	29:20	0:34	17:31	1:01:48	
8	Kyle Coon; Guide:Marty Andrie	United States		12:40	1:09	30:02	1:02	17:54	1:02:47	
9	Jose Luis García Serrano; Guide:Diego Mentrida Zamarra	Spain		12:41	-	29:54	0:54	18:31	1:03:17	
10	Lazar Filipovic; Guide:Jovan Ponjević	Serbia	+2:41	14:49	0:52	29:34	0:35	17:49	1:03:39	
11	Satoru Yoneoka; Guide:Kosuke Terasawa	Japan		12:33	1:17	31:57	0:38	19:29	1:05:54	
DNF	Héctor Catalá Laparra; Guide:Carlos Oliver Vives	Spain	+2:41							

Key : T = Transition
