= Carson Clough =

American paralympic triathlete

Sport
- Country: United States
- Sport: Paratriathlon
- Coached by: Mark Sortino
Medal record
Paratriathlon
Representing United States
Paralympic Games
| Silver medal – second place | 2024 Paris | PTS4 |
World Championships
| Gold medal – first place | 2023 Ponteverde | Mixed relay |
| Gold medal – first place | 2024 Torremolinos | Mixed relay |
| Gold medal – first place | 2025 Wollongong | Mixed relay |
Americas Championships
| Gold medal – first place | 2023 Sarasota | PTS4 |
| Gold medal – first place | 2024 Miami | PTS4 |

Carson Clough is an American paralympic triathlete. He competed at the 2024 Summer Paralympics, winning the silver medal in the men's PTS4 event.
