= World Triathlon at the 2022 European Championships =

- National federation: World Triathlon

in (Germany) Munich 11 August 2022 – 22 August 2022
- Competitors: 1
- Medals: Gold 0 Silver 0 Bronze 0 Total 0

European Championships appearances
- 2018; 2022

One athlete, Jeanne Lehair, was listed as representing World Triathlon at the 2022 European Championships in Munich. This is due to her being in the process of changing her national affiliation from France to Luxembourg.

== Competitors ==
The following is the list of number of competitors in the Championships:

Sport	Men	Women	Total
Triathlon	0	1	1

== Triathlon ==
Athlete	Event	Swim (1.5 km)	Trans 1	Bike (40 km)	Trans 2	Run (10 km)	Total Time	Rank
Jeanne Lehair	Women's						2:03:49	40
