= Camille Sénéclauze =

French paratriathlete (born 1998)

Personal information
- Born: 7 April 1998 (age 28) Paris, France

Sport
- Sport: Paratriathlon
- Disability: Multiple sclerosis
- Disability class: PTS4
- Club: CS Clichy Triathlon
Medal record
Women's paratriathlon
Representing France
World Championships
Gold medal – first place	2025 Wollongong	PTS4
Gold medal – first place	2026 Pontevedra	PTS4
European Championships
Gold medal – first place	2025 Besançon	PTS4
Bronze medal – third place	2024 Vichy	PTS4

Camille Sénéclauze (born 7 April 1998) is a French paratriathlete. She represented France at the 2024 Summer Paralympics.

== Career ==
In September 2024, she competed at the 2024 Summer Paralympics and finished in fourth place in the PTS4 event with a time of 1:16:43. She then competed at the 2024 European Triathlon Championships and won a bronze medal in the PTS4 event with a time of 1:12:12.

In October 2025, she competed at the 2025 World Triathlon Para Championships and won a gold medal in the PST4 event.

== Personal life ==
Sénéclauze was diagnosed with multiple sclerosis in 2019. She attended Audencia Business School and earned a master's degree.
