= Owen Cravens =

American paratriathlete (born 2003)

Personal information
- Nationality: American
- Born: June 26, 2003 (age 23) Algonquin, Illinois, U.S.
- Education: Arizona State University

Sport
- Sport: Paratriathlon
- Disability: Stargardt disease
- Disability class: PTVI
Medal record
Representing the United States
Men's paratriathlon
World Championships
Gold medal – first place	2025 Wollongong	Mixed relay

Owen Cravens (born June 26, 2003) is an American visually impaired paratriathlete. He represented the United States at the 2024 Summer Paralympics.

== Early life and education ==
Cravens was born in Algonquin, Illinois to Jerry and Deirdra and has two sisters, Allison and Jenna. He attended Huntley High School and is studying business at Arizona State University. He was diagnosed with Stargardt disease at ten years old.

== Career ==
Cravens grew up playing soccer, before losing his vision, and was introduced to triathlon through the Challenged Athletes Foundation. He made his elite paratriathlon debut in 2019. He represented the United States at the 2024 Summer Paralympics in the PTVI paratriathlon and finished in fourth place with a time of 1:00:43. In October 2025, he competed at the 2025 World Triathlon Para Championships and won a gold medal in the mixed team relay.
