= Susana Rodríguez (paratriathlete) =

Spanish doctor and paratriathlete (born 1988)

Personal information
- National team: Spain
- Born: 4 March 1988 (age 38) Vigo, Galicia, Spain

Sport
- Sport: Paratriathlon; Track and field
- Disability: Vision impairment
- Disability class: T11
Medal record
Representing Spain
Women's paratriathlon
Paralympic Games
| Gold medal – first place | Tokyo 2020 | PTVI |
| Gold medal – first place | Paris 2024 | PTVI |
World Championships
| Gold medal – first place | 2012 Auckland | TRI-6 |
| Gold medal – first place | 2018 Gold Coast | PTVI |
| Gold medal – first place | 2019 Lausanne | PTVI |
| Gold medal – first place | 2021 Abu Dhabi | PTVI |
| Gold medal – first place | 2022 Abu Dhabi | PTVI |
| Gold medal – first place | 2024 Torremolinos | PTVI |
| Gold medal – first place | 2025 Wollongong | PTVI |
| Gold medal – first place | 2026 Pontevedra | PTVI |
| Silver medal – second place | 2013 London | TRI-6b |
| Silver medal – second place | 2017 Rotterdam | PTVI |
| Silver medal – second place | 2023 Ponteverde | PTVI |
| Bronze medal – third place | 2014 Edmonton | PT5 |
| Bronze medal – third place | 2015 Chicago | PT5 |
| Bronze medal – third place | 2024 Torremolinos | Mixed relay |
European Championships
| Gold medal – first place | 2023 Madrid | PTVI |
| Gold medal – first place | 2022 Olsztyn | PTVI |
| Gold medal – first place | 2019 Valencia | PTVI |
| Gold medal – first place | 2017 Kitzbühel | PT5 |
| Gold medal – first place | 2024 Vichy | PTVI |
| Gold medal – first place | 2025 Besançon | PTVI |
| Silver medal – second place | 2018 Tartu | PTVI |
| Silver medal – second place | 2017 Kitzbühel | PTVI |
| Bronze medal – third place | 2016 Lisbon | PT5 |
| Bronze medal – third place | 2013 Alanya | TRI-6b |
Women's para-aquathlon
World Championships
| Silver medal – second place | 2014 Edmonton | PT5 |
| Bronze medal – third place | 2012 Auckland | TRI 6 |
Women's para-duathlon
World Championships
| Gold medal – first place | 2011 Gijon | TRI 6 |
| Gold medal – first place | 2012 Nancy | TRI 6 |
| Gold medal – first place | 2014 Pontevedra | PT5 |
| Gold medal – first place | 2016 Aviles | PT5 |

Susana Rodríguez Gacio (born 4 March 1988) is a Spanish doctor, paratriathlete and sprinter. She is a seven-time world champion in paratriathlon and twice Paralympic gold medalist in paratriathlon.

== Background ==
Rodríguez was born with albinism and a severe visual impairment that limits her vision to less than 5% in one eye and 8% in the other, which is considered legally blind.

Since childhood, she has combined her dedication to sports with a passion for medicine. Since 1998, Rodríguez has trained athletics with a teacher from the National Organization of the Spanish Blind (ONCE) at the Pontevedra Technification Center. She participated in athletics competitions until 2008, when she did not qualify for the Paralympic World Cup and decided to switch to triathlon.

== Career ==
In 2009, Rodríguez studied physiotherapy in Pontevedra in the Pontevedra Campus and in 2015 she graduated from the University of Santiago de Compostela with a degree in medicine, the year in which she began as a resident intern physician. She began her residency at the Hospital Clínico de Santiago de Compostela in 2016, working as a resident intern of physical medicine and rehabilitation.

In 2016, Rodríguez competed in the 2016 Paralympic Games in Rio de Janeiro with her guide Mabel Gallardo, finishing fifth in the individual triathlon event. She qualified to participate in the 2020 Summer Paralympics, being the first Spaniard to compete in two sports in the Paralympic Games: triathlon and athletics. She became the Paralympic triathlon champion in the PTVI class with her guide Sara Loehr. In addition, she became a candidate for the Athletes' Council of the International Paralympic Committee.

Rodríguez won a gold medal at Tokyo 2020 in the PTVI category. In addition, she obtained seven medals in the Adapted Triathlon World Championship between 2012 and 2019, and six medals in the Adapted Triathlon World Championship between 2013 and 2019. She retained her title as Paralympic champion in the 2024 Summer Paralympics.

== Awards and honors ==
In 2014, Rodríguez was recognized with the Premio Gallega del Año for February awarded by El Correo Gallego, Terras de Santiago, Correo TV and Radio Obradoiro. In 2021, she appeared on the cover of Time magazine for her dedication in the fight against COVID-19. That same year, the National Organization of the Spanish Blind (ONCE) dedicated a coupon to her for her participation in the 2020 Paralympic Games. In addition, she was awarded the Special Prize for MAS Talent on Board 2021, one of the three special awards of the VIII Women to Follow Awards, delivered in collaboration with Iberia.

On 15 November 2021, the plenary session of the Vigo City Council awarded Rodríguez the city's gold medal.
