= Antoine Perel =

French Paralympic athlete

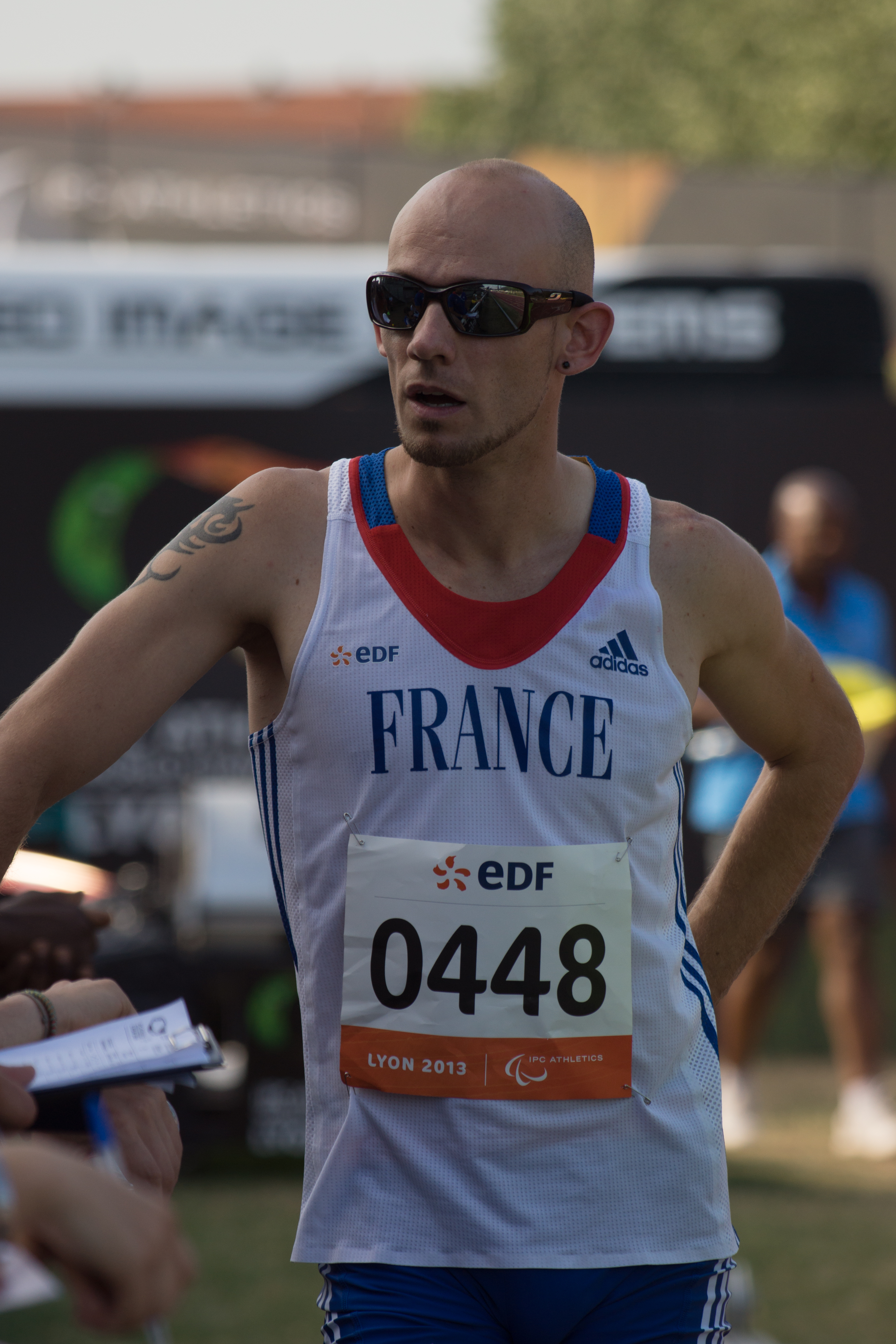

Personal information
- Nationality: French
- Born: 9 April 1986 (age 40)

Sport
- Country: France
- Sport: Paralympic athletics
- Disability class: T12
- Events: Long jump Sprint
- Club: AC Villeneuve d’Ascq
Medal record
Representing France
Men's paratriathlon
Paralympic Games
Bronze medal – third place	2024 Paris	PTVI
World Championships
Silver medal – second place	2025 Wollongong	PTVI
Bronze medal – third place	2022 Abu Dhabi	PTVI
Bronze medal – third place	2023 Ponteverde	PTVI
Bronze medal – third place	2024 Torremolinos	PTVI
Bronze medal – third place	2026 Pontevedra	PTVI
European Championships
Gold medal – first place	2023 Madrid	PTVI
Silver medal – second place	2025 Besançon	PTVI
Bronze medal – third place	2019 Valencia	PTVI
Men's para-athletics
IPC World Championships
Bronze medal – third place	2013 Lyon	4x100m relay- T11-12
IPC Athletics European Championships
Silver medal – second place	2014 Swansea	4x100m relay - T11-13

Antoine Perel (born 9 April 1986) is a Paralympian athlete from France competing mainly in category T12 long jump, pentathlon and sprint events.

== Career history ==
Perel has cone dystrophy a condition which effects his vision. He is a multi-event athlete and competes in T12 (track), P12 (pentathlon) and F12 (field) category sports. His favoured sport is the long jump. His first major tournament was the 2004 French Open and in 2008 he qualified for the 2008 Summer Paralympics in both the F12 long jump and P12 pentathlon. He finished ninth in both events.

At the 2012 Summer Paralympics, Perel saw both his favoured events dropped from the schedule for his classification. He attempted to make it to the Games as a triple jumper but failed to qualify for the event. The next year he entered the 2013 IPC Athletics World Championships in Lyon entering both the long jump and 100m relay. He failed to medal in the long jump, having the disadvantage of entering the F13 event as his F12 event was again dropped from the schedule. In the T11-13 relay he along with his teammates Hyacinthe Deleplace, Bacou Dambakate and Gauthier Makunda finished third to take the bronze medal.
