= Neele Ludwig =

German paratriathlete (born 1990)

Personal information
- Born: 27 December 1990 (age 35) Hamburg, Germany

Sport
- Sport: Paratriathlon
- Disability: Hemiplegia
- Disability class: PTS2
Medal record
Women's paratriathlon
Representing Germany
European Championships
Silver medal – second place	2023 Madrid	PTS2
Silver medal – second place	2024 Vichy	PTS2
Silver medal – second place	2025 Besançon	PTS2

Neele Ludwig (born 27 December 1990) is a German paratriathlete. She is a three-time European silver medalist and two-time German national champion, she has competed at the 2024 Summer Paralympics where she did not medal.

== Personal life ==
In 2019, Ludwig collapsed while being at a show at Barclaycard Arena. She was put in a medically induced coma for three days and has right-side paralysis.
