= 2024 European Triathlon Championships =

2024 European Championships
- Location: Vichy, France
- Dates: 21–22 September

Champions
- Men: Csongor Lehmann (HUN)
- Women: Vicky Holland (GBR)

The 2024 Europe Triathlon Championships, also known as the 2024 European Triathlon Championships was the 42nd edition of the event, held in Vichy, France from 21 to 22 September 2024.

== Medalists ==
=== Elite ===
Games	Gold		Silver		Bronze	
Men	Csongor Lehmann; Hungary	01:40:18	Yanis Seguin; France	01:40:22	Casper Stornes; Norway	01:40:28
Women	Vicky Holland; Great Britain	01:52:36	Léonie Périault; France	01:52:45	Alice Betto; Italy	01:53:07

=== Paratriathlon ===
Games	Gold		Silver		Bronze	
Men's events
PTWC	Geert Schipper; Netherlands	53:29	Florian Brungraber; Austria	54:17	Louis Noel; France	59:11
PTS2	Jules Ribstein; France	1:05:53	Vasilii Egorov; Individual Neutral Athletes	1:07:17	Wim De Paepe; Belgium	1:07:30
PTS3	Daniel Molina; Spain	1:05:30	Max Gelhaar; Germany	1:05:42	Henry Urand; Great Britain	1:06:12
PTS4	Alexis Hanquinquant; France	55:45	Nil Riudavets; Spain	58:30	Pierre-Antoine Baele; France	58:44
PTS5	Bence Mocsári; Hungary	56:44	Filipe Marques; Portugal	56:44	Tom Williamson; Ireland	57:06
PTVI	Dave Ellis; Great Britain	56:22	Thibaut Rigaudeau; France	56:52	Héctor Catalá Laparra; Spain	57:54
Women's events
PTWC	Eva María Moral Pedrero; Spain	1:10:50	Only two athletes			
PTS2	Cécile Saboureau; France	1:21:41	Only two athletes			
PTS3	Élise Marc; France	1:13:00	Anna Plotnikova; Individual Neutral Athletes	1:13:38	Only three athletes	
PTS4	Megan Richter; Great Britain	1:08:26	Marta Francés Gómez; Spain	1:11:45	Camille Sénéclauze; France	1:12:12
PTS5	Lauren Steadman; Great Britain	1:03:44	Gwladys Lemoussu; France	1:07:54	Alisa Kolpakchy; Ukraine	1:08:12
PTVI	Susana Rodríguez; Spain	1:04:43	Annouck Curzillat; France	1:05:32	Anja Renner; Germany	1:05:58

== Medal table ==
=== Elite ===
* Host nation (France)

Rank	Nation	Gold	Silver	Bronze	Total
1	France (FRA)*	4	5	3	12
2	Great Britain (GBR)	4	0	1	5
3	Spain (ESP)	3	2	1	6
4	Hungary (HUN)	2	0	0	2
5	Netherlands (NED)	1	0	0	1
–	Individual Neutral Athletes	0	2	0	2
6	Germany (GER)	0	1	1	2
7	Austria (AUT)	0	1	0	1
7	Portugal (POR)	0	1	0	1
9	Belgium (BEL)	0	0	1	1
9	Ireland (IRL)	0	0	1	1
9	Italy (ITA)	0	0	1	1
9	Norway (NOR)	0	0	1	1
9	Ukraine (UKR)	0	0	1	1
Totals (13 entries)		14	12	11	37
