= Élise Marc =

French cyclist

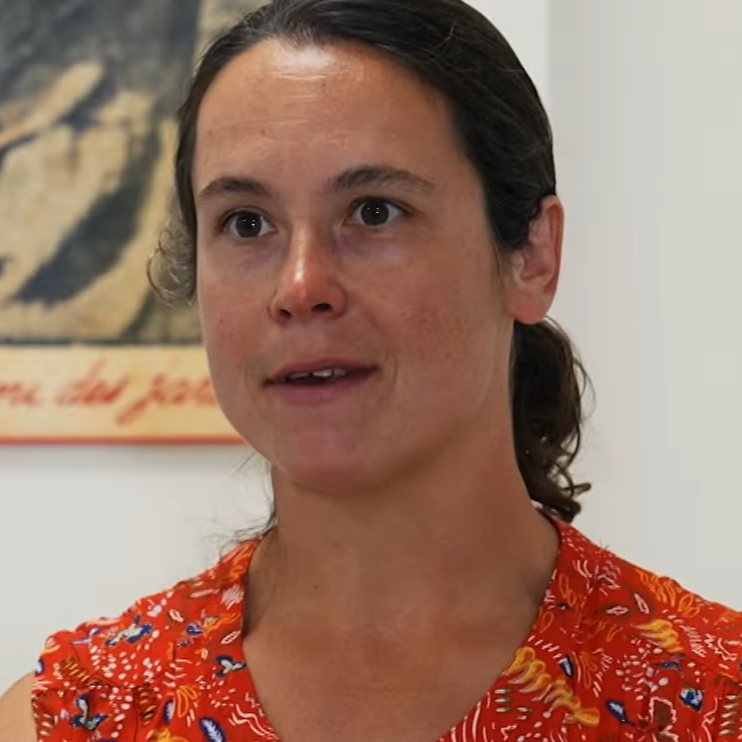
- Marc in 2024

Personal information
- Born: 25 October 1987 (age 38) Echirolles, France

Sport
- Country: France
- Sport: Paralympic cycling Paratriathlon
Medal record
Representing France
Women's paratriathlon
World Championships
Gold medal – first place	2017 Rotterdam	PTS3
Gold medal – first place	2019 Lausanne	PTS3
Gold medal – first place	2022 Abu Dhabi	PTS3
Gold medal – first place	2023 Ponteverde	PTS3
Gold medal – first place	2024 Torremolinos	PTS3
Gold medal – first place	2025 Wollongong	PTS3
Silver medal – second place	2018 Gold Coast	PTS3
Silver medal – second place	2021 Abu Dhabi	PTS3
Silver medal – second place	2026 Pontevedra	PTS3
Bronze medal – third place	2014 Edmonton	PT2
European Championships
Gold medal – first place	2016 Lisbon	PT2
Gold medal – first place	2018 Tartu	PTS3
Gold medal – first place	2019 Valencia	PTS3
Gold medal – first place	2023 Madrid	PTS3
Gold medal – first place	2024 Vichy	PTS3
Silver medal – second place	2025 Besançon	PTS3
Bronze medal – third place	2017 Kitzbuhel	PTS3
Para-cycling
World Road Championships
Silver medal – second place	2021 Cascais	Women's time trial C3

Élise Marc (born 25 October 1987) is a French Paralympic cyclist and paratriathlete. She is a two-time World and European champion in the paratriathlon and is a World silver medalist in road cycling. Marc lost her legs following an accident in 2004.
