= Filipe Marques =

Portuguese paratriathlete (born 1998)

Personal information
- Born: 9 July 1998 (age 28) Amora, Portugal

Sport
- Country: Portugal
- Sport: Paratriathlon
- Disability class: PTS5
Medal record
Men's paratriathlon
Representing Portugal
World Championships
Bronze medal – third place	2024 Torremolinos	PTS5
Bronze medal – third place	2026 Pontevedra	PTS5
European Championships
Silver medal – second place	2023 Madrid	PTS5
Silver medal – second place	2024 Vichy	PTS5
Silver medal – second place	2025 Besançon	PTS5
Bronze medal – third place	2021 Valencia	PTS5

Filipe Marques (born 9 July 1999) is a Portuguese paratriathlete. He represented Portugal at the 2024 Summer Paralympics.

== Career ==
Marques made his international debut for Portugal at the 2021 European Triathlon Championships and won a bronze medal in the PTS5 event. He again competed at the European Championships in 2022 and finished in fourth place with a time of 47:59, and won a silver medal in 2023 with a time of 55:18.

In September 2024, he represented Portugal at the 2024 Summer Paralympics, where he was the first person from Portugal to compete in the Paratriathlon at the Summer Paralympics. He competed in the PTS5 event and finished in fourth place, finishing 40 seconds behind bronze medalist Martin Schulz. Weeks later he then competed at the 2024 European Triathlon Championships and won a silver medal in the PTS5 event. In October, he then competed at the 2024 World Triathlon Para Championships and won a bronze medal in the PTS5 event with a time of 1:00.43.
