= Fanni Szalai =

Hungarian triathlete and long-distance runner

- Szalai in 2025

Personal information
- Nationality: Hungarian
- Born: 21 January 2008 (age 18)

Sport
- Sport: Athletics
- Events: Triathlon, Long-distance running

Achievements and titles
- Personal bests: 3000m: 9:23.30 (Banská Bystrica, 2024); 5000m: 16:20.81 (Budapest, 2024) NU18R

Fanni Szalai (born 21 January 2008) is a Hungarian triathlete and long-distance runner.

== Career ==
=== 2023 ===
Szalai became the youngest competitor in 2023 at the Arena Games Sursee, and went on to place third overall, as a 15-year-old. That year, she won the European Junior Cup events in Tiszaújváros and Caorle in amongst a run of five consecutive victories at that level. She was signed by the German team KTT 01 for the Bundesliga Triathlon. She was subsequently included in the Supertri NXT Gen's "Class of 2024".

=== 2024 ===
In 2024, she won junior triathlon titles in European Junior Cup events in Tiszaújváros, Austria, Serbia and Portugal. She also had success on the track in 2024, winning the Hungarian U18 indoor national championship title over 3000 metres, and came third in the event at the senior Hungarian Athletics Indoor Championships. At the outdoor 2024 Hungarian Athletics Championships in June, she placed third over 5000 meters, and set a Hungarian U18 national record with a time of 16:20.81 minutes, breaking the previous record was held by Gréta Varga since 2020. The time also moved her to the top of the European rankings in the age-group. She then placed fourth over 3000 metres at the 2024 European Athletics U18 Championships, running 9:23.30 in Banská Bystrica.

Szalai won the European junior title at the Europe Triathlon Sprint & Relay Championship Balikesir in Turkey. Later that year, she was runner-up in the Junior World Championships Triathlon at the World Triathlon Grand Final in Torremolinos.

=== 2025 ===
In February 2025, she placed fourth over 3000 metres at the Hungarian Indoor Athletics Championships. Later that year she had a win in the Bundesliga Triathlon for KTT 01 team and placed third at the final in Dresden. In August 2025, she placed third at the Supertri League event in Chicago, behind Jeanne Lehair and Georgia Taylor-Brown.
