= Ricardo Batista (triathlete) =

Portuguese Triathlete

Personal information
- Born: 20 November 2000 (age 25) Torres Novas, Portugal

Sport
- Country: Portugal
- Sport: Triathlon
- Event: Olimpic Games Paris 2024 6th Place Individual 5th Place Mixed Relay
Medal record
Men's triathlon
Representing Portugal
World Junior Championships
Gold medal – first place	2019 Lausane	Junior
European Championships
Gold medal – first place	2021 Kitzbühel	Under-23
Gold medal – first place	2023 Balıkesir	Under-23
European Sprint Championships
Gold medal – first place	2023 Balıkesir	Elite

Ricardo Batista (born 20 November 2000) is a Portuguese triathlete.

Batista won the 2023 Europe Triathlon Sprint Championships in Balıkesir, Turkey. He also finished 6th place in the men's triathlon at the 2024 Summer Olympics.

The Portuguese Triathlon Mixed Relay team (Ricardo Batista, Melanie Santos, Vasco Vilaça and Maria Tomé) finished in 5th place at the 2024 Summer Olympics.
