= Tilda Månsson =

Swedish triathlete and runner (born 2004)

- Månsson in 2026

Personal information
- Nationality: Swedish
- Born: Tilda Elin Karin Månsson; May 13, 2004 (age 22) Upplands Väsby, Sweden
- Height: 1.70 m (5 ft 7 in)

Sport
- Club: Väsby SS Triathlon
- Coached by: Hampus Månsson

Tilda Elin Karin Månsson (born 13 May 2004) is a Swedish professional triathlete and long-distance runner.

She was the World Junior Triathlon Champion in 2022, is a multi-time Triathlon World Cup winner, and represented Sweden at the 2024 Summer Olympics in Paris. In 2026, she achieved a career-high world ranking of No. 7 after securing her first victory on the premium World Triathlon Championship Series (WTCS) circuit.

== Biography ==
=== Early life and junior career ===
Månsson was born on 13 May 2004 in Upplands Väsby, Sweden. She trains domestically with Väsby SS Triathlon. Her athletic development is managed by her older brother, Hampus Månsson, who acts as her head coach, while her younger sister, Hanna (born 2008), also competes as an elite-level junior triathlete.

Månsson emerged on the international junior multi-sport scene in 2021. At the 2021 European Triathlon Championships in Kitzbühel, she claimed the silver medal in the Junior race . Later that season at the 2021 World Junior Championships in Quarteira, she took another silver medal, finishing seven seconds behind Germany's Jule Behrens; this achievement marked Sweden's first-ever medal in the history of the World Triathlon Junior Championships. Domestically, she won her first senior national sprint title the same year.

In 2022, Månsson secured the European Junior Championship title in Olsztyn before traveling to Montreal to capture the World Junior Championship crown. Because of localized water contamination, the Montreal event was altered to a duathlon format, which Månsson completed in 57 minutes 17 seconds to take the gold ahead of Behrens and Switzerland's Livia Gross. Alongside maintaining her Swedish national title and winning the Nordic Championship, she captured her maiden senior-level international title at the Bergen World Cup in a sprint finish over Jolien Vermeylen. For her breakthrough 2022 season, she was awarded the Lilla Bragdguldet (Little Bragd Gold Medal) by Svenska Dagbladet.

=== Senior multi-sport career ===
In 2023, Månsson collected her third consecutive senior national sprint title and earned her second career World Cup gold medal at Tiszaújváros in Hungary, alongside a bronze-medal performance in Tangier.

She began her 2024 Olympic campaign by winning the Wollongong World Cup in Australia and taking second place at Chengdu, China. She was selected to represent Sweden at the 2024 Summer Olympics in Paris, where she crossed the line in 23rd place in the individual event with a time of 1:59:22 following a crash-marred cycling segment.

In 2025, she secured her first elite top-ten finishes in the premier world series, including an 8th-place finish in Yokohama, Sweden's best top-tier result since 2012, and a 5th-place finish at WTCS Hamburg. Though a late-season foot injury forced her to miss the WTCS Finals in Wollongong, she returned to top form for the 2026 racing year.

On 16 May 2026, Månsson captured her maiden World Triathlon Championship Series victory at WTCS Yokohama, outsprinting reigning world champion Beth Potter to the line. This marked the first Swedish WTCS event win since Olympic medalist Lisa Nordén won in 2012. She continued her podium streak across 2026 with a silver at WTCS Quiberon (where she logged the fastest run split of 15:49 over 5.1 km), bronze medals at WTCS London and Hamburg, and a second-place finish at the Rome World Cup, lifting her to a career-high world ranking of No. 7.

=== Running career ===
Paralleling her triathlon career, Månsson competes at an elite national level in track and field and cross country running. In December 2023, she helped secure a team bronze medal for the Swedish junior squad at the European Cross Country Championships in Brussels.

On the roads, Månsson won the 2025 Bålsta stadslopp 10k in a time that placed her seventh on the Swedish all-time list. In January 2026, she ran a personal best of 31:53 at the Valencia 10k, dropping her previous record by 37 seconds and moving her into third place on the Swedish women's all-time historical rankings. On 5 September 2026, she won the prestigious Tjejmilen road race in Stockholm following a late-race tactical sprint finish.

== Results ==
The following table lists Månsson's most significant podium finishes in national and international triathlon and duathlon competitions since 2021.

Year	Competition	Location	Position	Time
2021	Swedish Sprint Triathlon Championships	Sweden	1st place, gold medalist(s)	1:01:12
2021	Swedish Duathlon Championships	Sweden	1st place, gold medalist(s)	0:57:17
2022	World Triathlon Cup – Bergen	Norway	1st place, gold medalist(s)	1:02:48
2022	Swedish Sprint Triathlon Championships	Sweden	1st place, gold medalist(s)	N/A
2023	World Triathlon Cup – Tiszaújváros	Hungary	1st place, gold medalist(s)	0:58:45
2023	World Triathlon Cup – Tangier	Morocco	3rd place, bronze medalist(s)	0:59:02
2023	Swedish Sprint Triathlon Championships	Sweden	1st place, gold medalist(s)	0:58:02
2024	World Triathlon Cup – Wollongong	Australia	1st place, gold medalist(s)	1:00:39
2024	World Triathlon Cup – Chengdu	China	2nd place, silver medalist(s)	1:56:09
2024	World Triathlon Cup – Samarkand	Uzbekistan	3rd place, bronze medalist(s)	1:53:09
2025	World Triathlon Cup – Tiszaújváros	Hungary	3rd place, bronze medalist(s)	0:57:42
2026	World Triathlon Cup – Rome	Italy	2nd place, silver medalist(s)	0:57:11
2026	WTCS – London	Great Britain	3rd place, bronze medalist(s)	0:56:21
2026	WTCS – Hamburg	Germany	3rd place, bronze medalist(s)	0:56:03
2026	WTCS – Quiberon	France	2nd place, silver medalist(s)	0:58:37
2026	WTCS – Yokohama	Japan	1st place, gold medalist(s)	1:50:13
