= Jeanne Lehair =

French-born Luxembourg triathlete (born 1996)

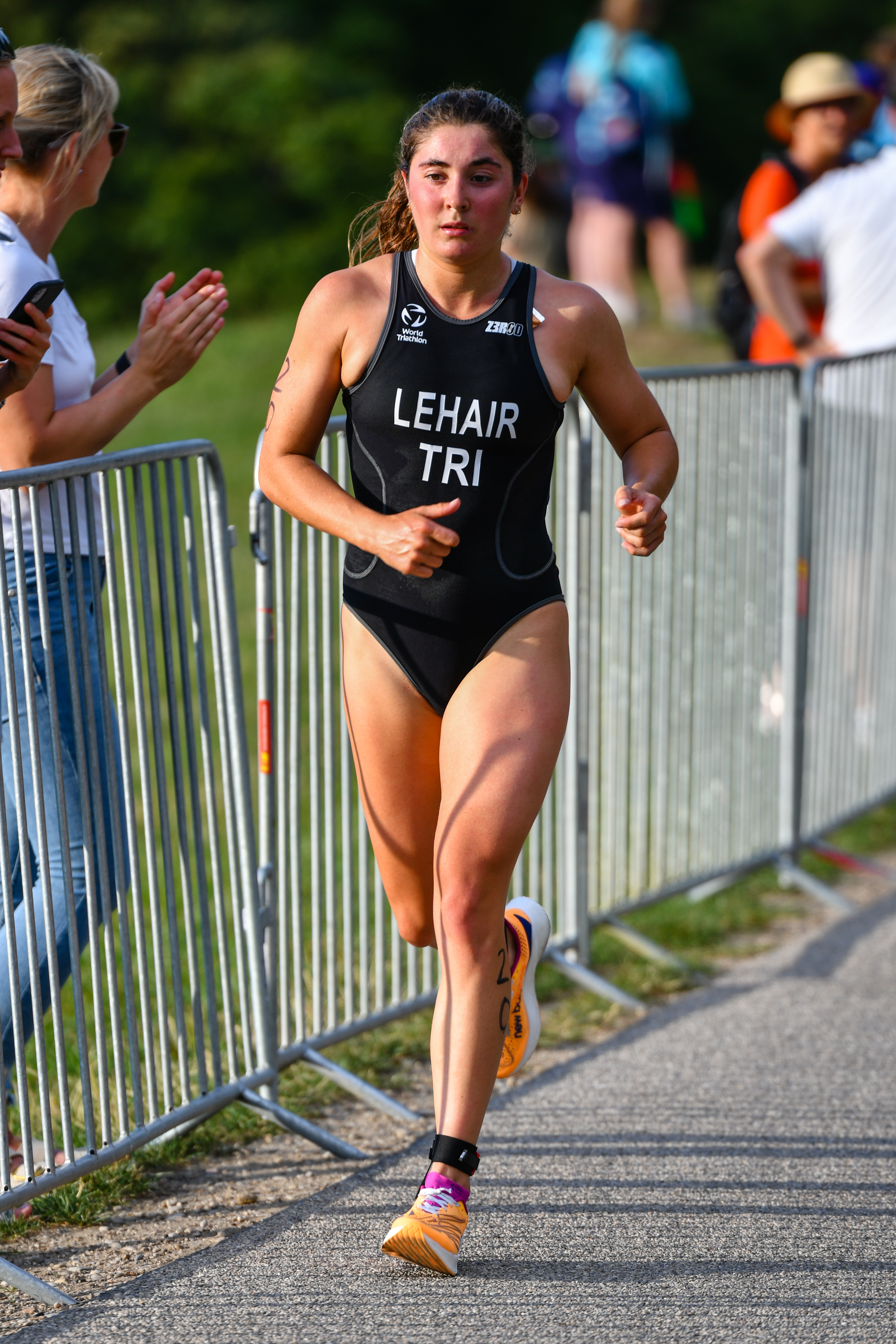
- in Munich in 2022

Personal information
- Born: 30 March 1996 (age 30) Metz, France
Medal record
Women's triathlon
Representing Luxembourg
Europe Championships
Gold medal – first place	2023 Madrid	Individual

Jeanne Lehair (born March 30, 1996) is a French born Luxembourg professional triathlete. She changed her nationality in time to compete at the Paris Olympics and she became the European Champion in 2023 under her new flag.

== Life ==
Lehair was born in Metz and at the age of seven she got interested in sport and joined the local Sports Club in the following year. Her father was interested in triathlon and she was interested in several sports. The triathlon event was a natural choice and she became a youth champion in 2011. Her stubborn determination and ambition resulted in her becoming a champion at aquathon and duathlon in 2012 and 2013 respectively. When she was eighteen she was training to be a physiotherapist. In 2015, she became European and world mixed relay champion with the French team.

In 2021 she was competing as a French athlete, but she decided to compete for the country of Luxembourg. At 2022 European Championships she was not given a country because she was in transition. Luxembourg was noted as being keen to have her in their team, but she was still competing as French.

In March 2023 she was one of three athletes whose requested change of nationality was recognised by the International Olympic Committee. The changes were made using a speedy route because there were no objections, and this meant that she would be eligible to compete at the 2024 Paris Olympics.

In June 2023 she won the European Triathlon Championships in Madrid.

In August 2023 she was competing for Luxembourg in London. She won the event beating Sophie Coldwell from the UK and the American Taylor Spivey.

She competed in the women's triathlon at the 2024 Summer Olympics in Paris, France.
