= Para triathlon =

Triathlon for disabled athletes

Para triathlon is a variant of the triathlon for athletes with a physical disability. The sport is governed by World Triathlon (TRI; formerly known as the International Triathlon Union or ITU), and was first held as a Paralympic event at the 2016 Summer Paralympics in Rio de Janeiro, Brazil.

At events sanctioned by World Triathlon, athletes compete over a Para triathlon sprint distance event with a 750 m swim, 20 km cycle using handcycles, bicycles or tandem bicycles with a guide and a 5 km wheelchair or running race. Athletes compete in nine sport classes according to the nature of their physical impairments, with variations made to the traditional event structure commensurate with their disability.

Triathlon at the Summer Paralympics is a sprint race consisting of 750 m swimming, 20 km cycling and 5 km running stages.

At the 2018 Commonwealth Games, Para triathlon was staged with athletes across multiple categories, with staggered starts introduced to ensure fair competition between categories.

== Classification ==
=== Classification system until 2014 ===
Until the 2014 season, there were seven categories:

- TRI 1 – Wheelchair user. Paraplegic, quadriplegic and other impairments that preclude use of a leg-pedalled bicycle. Use a handcycle on the cycling stage and a racing wheelchair on the running stage.
- TRI 2 – Severe leg impairment which includes above knee amputation. Use a conventional bicycle and run with above-knee prosthesis or using crutches.
- TRI 3 – Les Autres, including athletes with multiple sclerosis, muscular dystrophy, cerebral palsy, double leg amputation or paralysis in multiple limbs. Use a conventional bicycle or a tricycle and run with leg braces or prosthesis.
- TRI 4 – Arm impairments, including paralysis, amputation or other impairment in one or both arms. Use a conventional bicycle and may use braces, prosthesis or slings on the cycling and/or running stage.
- TRI 5 – Moderate leg impairment, including below knee amputation. Use a conventional bicycle and may run with brace or prosthesis.
- TRI 6a – Visual impairment, total blindness or may be able to perceive light but not recognise the shape of a hand at any distance or direction. Competes with a guide of the same sex and uses a tandem bicycle.
- TRI 6b – Visual impairment, acuity of less than 6/60 or field of less than 40 degrees with correction. Competes with a guide of the same sex and uses a tandem bicycle.

=== Classification system 2014–2016 ===
The ITU revised the Para triathlon classification system in preparation for the sport's debut at the 2016 Summer Paralympics. The ITU formed a Paratriathlon Classification Research Group to develop an evidence-based and sport-specific classification system, drawing on work in swimming, cycling and athletics.

The result of the research is a new classification system which has been implemented during the 2014 season. There were five classes; PT1 to PT4 was for athletes with various mobility impairments, with PT1 for the most impaired and PT4 for the least impaired. PT5 was for visually impaired athletes.

- PT1 – Athletes with mobility impairments such as muscle power, limb deficiency, hypertonia, ataxia or athetosis that render them incapable of safely running or pedalling a bicycle. They must have a classification assessment score of up to 640.0 points. Athletes must use a recumbent handcycle during the cycling stage and a racing wheelchair for the running phase of the race.
- PT2 – Athletes with mobility impairments such as muscle power, limb deficiency, hypertonia, ataxia or athetosis that have a classification assessment score of up to 454.9 points. Amputees may use approved prostheses or supportive devices during the running and cycling stages.
- PT3 – Athletes with mobility impairments such as muscle power, limb deficiency, hypertonia, ataxia or athetosis that have a classification assessment score from 455.0 to 494.9 points. Athletes may use approved prostheses or supportive devices during the running and cycling stages.
- PT4 – Athletes with mobility impairments such as muscle power, limb deficiency, hypertonia, ataxia or athetosis that have a classification assessment score from 495.0 to 557.0 points. Athletes may use approved prostheses or supportive devices during the running and cycling stages.
- PT5 – Athletes with a visual impairment. All qualifying levels of visual impairment, IBSA/IPC defined sub-classes B1, B2, and B3, are grouped together in this classification. Athletes must have a sighted guide of the same gender and nationality during the entire race and use a tandem bicycle during the cycling stage.

=== Classification system from 2017 ===
The ITU revised the Para triathlon classification system post-2016 Summer Paralympics. There are nine sport classes that compete in six medal events:

- PTWC1 – Most impaired wheelchair users. Athletes must use a recumbent handcycle on the bike course and a racing wheelchair on the run segment; Includes athletes with comparable activity limitation and an impairment of, but not limited to: muscle power, limb deficiency, hypertonia, ataxia or athetosis.
- PTWC2 – Least impaired wheelchair users. Athletes must use a recumbent handcycle on the bike course and a racing wheelchair on the run segment; Includes athletes with comparable activity limitation and an impairment of, but not limited to: muscle power, limb deficiency, hypertonia, ataxia or athetosis.
- PTS2 – Severe impairments. In both bike and run segments, amputee athletes may use approved prosthesis or other supportive devices. Includes athletes with comparable activity limitation and an impairment of, but not limited to, limb deficiency, hypertonia, ataxia and or athetosis, impaired muscle power or range of movement.
- PTS3 – Significant impairments. In both bike and run segments, amputee athletes may use approved prosthesis or other supportive devices. Includes athletes with comparable activity limitation and an impairment of, but not limited to, limb deficiency, hypertonia, ataxia and or athetosis, impaired muscle power or range of movement.
- PTS4 – Moderate impairments. In both bike and run segments, amputee athletes may use approved prosthesis or other supportive devices. Includes athletes with comparable activity limitation and an impairment of, but not limited to, limb deficiency, hypertonia, ataxia and or athetosis, impaired muscle power or range of movement.
- PTS5 – Mild impairments. In both bike and run segments, amputee athletes may use approved prosthesis or other supportive devices. Includes athletes with comparable activity limitation and an impairment of, but not limited to, limb deficiency, hypertonia, ataxia and or athetosis, impaired muscle power or range of movement.
- PTVI1 – Includes athletes who are totally blind, from no light perception in either eye, to some light perception. One guide is mandatory throughout the race. Must ride a tandem during the bike segment. A guide from the same nationality and gender is mandatory throughout the race. Must ride a tandem during the bike segment.
- PTVI2 – Includes athletes who are more severe partially sighted athletes. One guide is mandatory throughout the race. Must ride a tandem during the bike segment. A guide from the same nationality and gender is mandatory throughout the race. Must ride a tandem during the bike segment.
- PTVI3 – Includes athletes who are less severe partially sighted athletes. One guide is mandatory throughout the race. Must ride a tandem during the bike segment. A guide from the same nationality and gender is mandatory throughout the race. Must ride a tandem during the bike segment.
