= Australian Paralympic Paratriathlon Team =

Australia was represented in the first Paralympic Paratriathlon event at the Rio 2016 Summer Paralympics.

== Medal tally ==
Games	Gold	Silver	Bronze	Total
2016 Rio	1	0	0	1
2020 Tokyo	0	1	0	1
2024 Paris	1	1	0	2
Totals (3 entries)	2	2	0	4

== Summer Paralympic Games ==
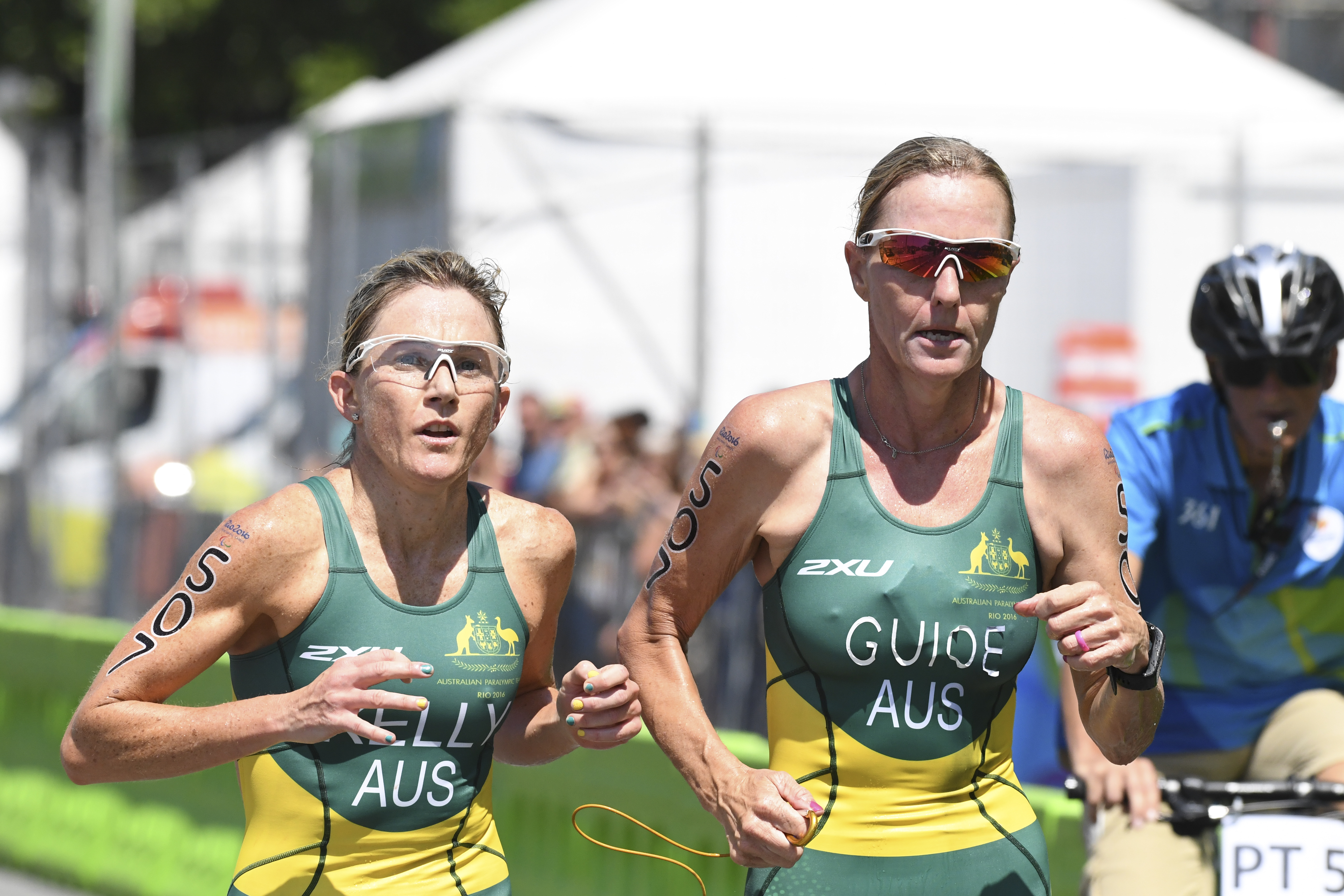
Katie Kelly with guide Michellie Jones at the 2016 Rio Paralympics

=== 2016 Rio ===
Australia was represented by:

Men - Nic Beveridge, Bill Chaffey, Brant Garvey Women - Kate Doughty, Katie Kelly, Michellie Jones (guide for Kelly), Claire McLean
Officials - Team Leader - Kathryn Periac; Assistant Team Leader/Coach - Craig Redman; Coaches - Corey Bacon, Shaun D’Auria; Mechanic/Handler - Mechanic/ Handler; Handler - Darren Tattersall
Katie Kelly with guide Michellie Jones won a gold medal.

=== 2020 Tokyo ===
Australia was represented by:
Men - Nic Beveridge, Jonathan Goerlach, Dave Mainwaring (guide for Goerlach), David Bryant
Women- Katie Kelly, Briarna Silk (guide) for Kelly, Lauren Parker, Emily Tapp
Coaches - Dan Atkins, Danielle Stefano, Megan Hall
Officials - Para Lead - Kyle Burns, Bike Mechanic - Onishi Shoji, Fixer - Kiyomi Niwata, Handler - Brad Fernley, Fabrizio Andreon, Matthew Pilbeam

Lauren Parker won the silver medal in the Women's PTWC.

Detailed Australian Results

=== 2024 Paris ===
Australia was represented by:
Men - Nic Beveridge, David Bryant, Tom Goodman, Justin Godfrey, Sam Harding (Aaron Royle (guide), Jack Howell, Jeremy Peacock, Liam Twomey
Women- Grace Brimelow, Anu Francis, Lauren Parker, Sally Pilbeam
Coaches - Dan Atkins, Danielle Stefano, Steven Gleeson, Steven Gleeson
Officials - Team manager- Kyle Burns, Handlers - Matthew Pilbeam, David Robertson, Support staff - Daniel Mangano, Carer - Sarah Roder, Mechanic - Paul Wright

Lauren Parker won the gold medal in the Women's PTWC.

Detailed Australian Results

== See also ==
- Paratriathlon at the Summer Paralympics
- Australia at the Paralympics
