= 2025 World Triathlon Championship Series =

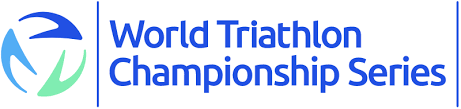
- League: World Triathlon Championship Series
- Sport: Triathlon

Men's Series
- World Champion: Matthew Hauser (AUS)
- Points: 4250.00

Women's Series
- World Champion: Lisa Tertsch (GER)
- Points: 3886.26

World Triathlon Championship Series seasons
- 2024 2026

The 2025 World Triathlon Championship Series was the 17th season of the World Triathlon Championship Series, the top level international series for triathlon, since its establishment in 2009, and crowned the 37th official World Triathlon Champion for both men and women since the first was crowned in 1989. The overall world champions were Matthew Hauser of Australia and Lisa Tertsch of Germany. Both athletes were winning their first title.

The season consists of eight pairs of triathlon races for both a men's and women's competition, beginning on 15 February in Abu Dhabi, and concluding on 19 October with the grand final in Wollongong, New South Wales.

The World Champion is decided on a cumulative points basis, with the sum of their three best points scores, plus their score in Wollongong, deciding the series rankings, medallists and champions. In addition, points were available on a reduced scale (40% of a standard Series race, a significant reduction from 2024) for each of the continental championships.

The 2005 Grand Final incorporated the 2025 World Triathlon Para Championships, as well as a number of amateur World Triathlon Age-group Championships.

== World Triathlon Championship Series summary ==
All standard distance races unless specified.

=== Men ===
Event	Gold	Silver	Bronze
World Triathlon Championship Series Events
Abu Dhabi, UAE; Sprint distance	Hayden Wilde; New Zealand	Matthew Hauser; Australia	Vasco Vilaça; Portugal
Yokohama, Japan	Matthew Hauser; Australia	Vasco Vilaça; Portugal	Miguel Hidalgo; Brazil
Alghero, Italy	Miguel Hidalgo; Brazil	Matthew Hauser; Australia	Léo Bergère; France
Hamburg, Germany; Sprint distance	Matthew Hauser; Australia	Vasco Vilaça; Portugal	Alessio Crociani; Italy
French Riviera; Sprint distance	Matthew Hauser; Australia	Vasco Vilaça; Portugal	Miguel Hidalgo; Brazil
Karlovy Vary, Czechia	Henry Graf; Germany	Miguel Hidalgo; Brazil	Csongor Lehmann; Hungary
Weihai, China	Max Studer; Switzerland	Henry Graf; Germany	John Reed; United States
Wollongong, Australia^{Grand Final}	Matthew Hauser; Australia	David Cantero del Campo; Spain	Alessio Crociani; Italy
Continental championships
Mandela Bay, RSA; African Championship	Jawad Abdelmoula; Morocco	Julian Birkel; South Africa	Badr Siwane; Morocco
Calima, Colombia; Americas Championship	Diego Moya; Chile	Sullivan Middaugh; United States	Osvaldo Zuñiga; Mexico
Istanbul, Turkiye; Asian Championship	Takumi Hojo; Japan	Xirui Zhang; China	Jeremy Quindos; Uzbekistan
Istanbul, Turkiye; European Championship	Max Studer; Switzerland	Bence Bicsák; Hungary	Panagiotis Bitados; Greece
Devonport, Australia; Oceanian Championship	Brandon Copeland; Australia	James Corbett; New Zealand	Lachlan Jones; Australia
Overall^{World Championship}	Matthew Hauser; Australia	Miguel Hidalgo; Brazil	Vasco Vilaça; Portugal

=== Women ===
All standard distance races unless specified.

Event	Gold	Silver	Bronze
World Triathlon Championship Series Events
Abu Dhabi, UAE; Sprint distance	Lisa Tertsch; Germany	Nina Eim; Germany	Laura Lindemann; Germany
Yokohama, Japan	Jeanne Lehair; Luxembourg	Beth Potter; Great Britain	Lisa Tertsch; Germany
Alghero, Italy	Cassandre Beaugrand; France	Bianca Seregni; Italy	Olivia Mathias; Great Britain
Hamburg, Germany; Sprint distance	Léonie Périault; France	Cassandre Beaugrand; France	Beth Potter; Great Britain
French Riviera; Sprint distance	Cassandre Beaugrand; France	Jeanne Lehair; Luxembourg	Léonie Périault; France
Karlovy Valy, Czechia	Beth Potter; Great Britain	Taylor Spivey; United States	Lisa Tertsch; Germany
Weihai, China	Lisa Tertsch; Germany	Beth Potter; Great Britain	Georgia Taylor-Brown; Great Britain
Wollongong, Australia^{Grand Final}	Lisa Tertsch; Germany	Bianca Seregni; Italy	Emma Lombardi; France
Continental championships
Mandela Bay, RSA; African Championship	Shanae Williams; South Africa	Bridget Theunissen; South Africa	Jordan Tissink; South Africa
Calima, Colombia; Americas Championship	Djenyfer Arnold; Brazil	Maria Lopez Faraudo; Mexico	Emy Legault; Canada
Istanbul, Turkiye; Asian Championship	Yuko Takahashi; Japan	Manami Hayashi; Japan	Kanae Takenaka; Japan
Istanbul, Turkiye; European Championship	Jolien Vermeylen; Belgium	Diana Isakova; Neutral athlete	Tilly Anema; Great Britain
Devonport, Australia; Oceanian Championship	Richelle Hill; Australia	Lauren Kerwick; Australia	Nicole van der Kaay; New Zealand
Overall^{World Championship}	Lisa Tertsch; Germany	Léonie Périault; France	Beth Potter; Great Britain

== Race results ==
=== Men ===
Abu Dhabi, 15 February 2025
Position	Athlete	Time
1	Hayden Wilde (NZL)	48:21
2	Matthew Hauser (AUS)	48:23
3	Vasco Vilaça (POR)	48:39
4	Henry Graf (GER)	48:55
5	Adrien Briffod (SUI)	48:55
6	Ricardo Batista (POR)	48:56
7	Roberto Sánchez (ESP)	48:56
8	Ben Djikstra (GBR)	48:57
9	David Cantero (ESP)	48:59
10	Miguel Hidalgo (BRA)	49:04

Yokohama, 17 May 2025
Position	Athlete	Time
1	Matthew Hauser (AUS)	01:41:08
2	Vasco Vilaça (POR)	01:41:14
3	Miguel Hidalgo (BRA)	01:41:29
4	Léo Bergere (FRA)	01:41:57
5	Dorian Coninx (FRA)	01:42:03
6	Tyler Mislawchuk (CAN)	01:42:04
7	Ricardo Batista (POR)	01:42:12
8	Ben Dijkstra (GBR)	01:42:36
9	Csongor Lehmann (HUN)	01:42:43
10	Charles Paquet (CAN)	01:42:51

Alghero, 31 May 2025
Position	Athlete	Time
1	Miguel Hidalgo (BRA)	01:44:05
2	Matthew Hauser (AUS)	01:44:33
3	Léo Bergere (FRA)	01:45:09
4	Luke Willian (AUS)	01:45:29
5	Charles Paquet (CAN)	01:45:36
6	David Cantero (ESP)	01:45:42
7	Roberto Sanchez (ESP)	01:45:57
8	Hugo Milner (GBR)	01:45:58
9	Miguel Tiago Silva (POR)	01:46:12
10	Csongor Lehmann (HUN)	01:46:25

Hamburg, 12 July 2025
Position	Athlete	Time
1	Matthew Hauser (AUS)	00:50:07
2	Vasco Vilaça (POR)	00:50:14
3	Alessio Crociani (ITA)	00:50:36
4	Miguel Hidalgo (BRA)	00:50:37
5	Henry Graf (GER)	00:50:47
6	Csongor Lehmann (HUN)	00:50:53
7	Max Stapley (GBR)	00:50:56
8	David Cantero (ESP)	00:51:09
9	Ricardo Batista (POR)	00:51:11
10	Adrien Briffod (SUI)	00:51:13

French Riviera, 31 July 2025
Position	Athlete	Time
1	Matthew Hauser (AUS)	50:53
2	Vasco Vilaça (POR)	50:57
3	Miguel Hidalgo (BRA)	51:20
4	Dorian Coninx (FRA)	51:27
5	Tom Richard (FRA)	51:32
6	Alberto Gonzalez (ESP)	51:37
7	Charles Paquet (CAN)	51:37
8	Henry Graf (GER)	51:43
9	Alex Yee (GBR)	51:49
10	David Cantero (ESP)	52:06

Karlovy Vary, 14 September 2025
Position	Athlete	Time
1	Henry Graf (GER)	1:49:22
2	Miguel Hidalgo (BRA)	1:49:29
3	Csongor Lehmann (HUN)	1:49:46
4	Oliver Conway (GBR)	1:49:49
5	Adrien Briffod (SUI)	1:49:52
6	Alessio Crociani (ITA)	1:50:12
7	Diego Moya (CHI)	1:50:17
8	Matthew Hauser (AUS)	1:50:24
9	Tjebbe Kaindl (AUT)	1:50:27
10	Márk Dévay (HUN)	1:50:41

Weihai, 27 September 2025
Position	Athlete	Time
1	Alex Yee (GBR)	1:48:21
2	Léo Bergere (FRA)	1:49:07
3	Miguel Hidalgo (BRA)	1:49:18
4	Alberto Gonzalez (ESP)	1:49:47
5	Vincent Luis (FRA)	1:49:52
6	Luke Willian (AUS)	1:49:58
7	Hayden Wilde (NZL)	1:50:01
8	Dylan McCullough (NZL)	1:50:03
9	Jack Willis (GBR)	1:50:18
10	Pierre Le Corre (FRA)	1:50:42

Wollongong, 18 October 2025 Grand final
Position	Athlete	Time
1	Matthew Hauser (AUS)	1:42:42
2	David Cantero (ESP)	1:43:15
3	Alessio Crociani (ITA)	1:43:22
4	Miguel Hidalgo (BRA)	1:43:41
5	Vasco Vilaça (POR)	1:43:44
6	Max Studer (SUI)	1:43:47
7	Miguel Tiago (POR)	1:43:54
8	Henry Graf (GER)	1:43:55
9	Tyler Mislawchuk (CAN)	1:44:00
10	Csongor Lehmann (HUN)	1:44:13
11	Morgan Pearson (USA)	1:44:23
13	Charles Paquet (CAN)	1:44:32
12	Connor Bentley (GBR)	1:44:32
14	Harry Leleu (GBR)	1:44:44
15	Ricardo Batista (POR)	1:44:45
16	Luke Willian (AUS)	1:44:47
17	Dorian Coninx (FRA)	1:44:49
18	Vetle Bergsvik Thorn (NOR)	1:44:55
19	Jack Willis (GBR)	1:45:04
20	Diego Moya (CHI)	1:45:07

=== Women ===
Abu Dhabi, 15 February 2025
Position	Athlete	Time
1	Lisa Tertsch (GER)	54:29
2	Nina Eim (GER)	54:30
3	Laura Lindemann (GER)	54:31
4	Léonie Périault (FRA)	54:35
5	Rosa Maria Tapia Vidal (MEX)	54:46
6	Tanja Neubert (GER)	54:46
7	Jeanne Lehair (LUX)	54:54
8	Bianca Seregni (ITA)	54:57
9	Diana Isakova (RUS)	54:58
10	Kate Waugh (GBR)	55:02

Yokohama, 17 May 2025
Position	Athlete	Time
1	Jeanne Lehair (LUX)	1:51:34
2	Beth Potter (GBR)	1:51:38
3	Lisa Tertsch (GER)	1:51:40
4	Gwen Jorgensen (USA)	1:51:52
5	Annika Koch (GER)	1:51:56
6	Diana Isakova (AIN)	1:52:04
7	Rosa Tapia (MEX)	1:52:19
8	Tilda Månsson (SWE)	1:52:25
9	Taylor Spivey (USA)	1:52:28
10	Maria Tomé (POR)	1:52:42

Alghero, 31 May 2025
Position	Athlete	Time
1	Cassandre Beaugrand (FRA)	1:55:55
2	Bianca Seregni (ITA)	1:56:33
3	Olivia Mathias (GBR)	1:57:04
4	Maya Kingma (NED)	1:57:46
5	Léonie Périault (FRA)	1:57:59
6	Lisa Tertsch (GER)	1:58:06
7	Jeanne Lehair (LUX)	1:58:14
8	Beth Potter (GBR)	1:58:42
9	Jolien Vermeylen (BEL)	1:58:47
10	Therese Feuersinger (AUT)	1:58:52

Hamburg, 12 July 2025
Position	Athlete	Time
1	Léonie Périault (FRA)	56:25
2	Cassandre Beaugrand (FRA)	56:29
3	Beth Potter (GBR)	56:32
4	Jolien Vermeylen (BEL)	56:44
5	Tilda Månsson (SWE)	56:47
6	Kate Waugh (GBR)	56:48
7	Jeanne Lehair (LUX)	56:52
8	Emma Lombardi (FRA)	56:54
9	Lisa Tertsch (GER)	56:58
10	Taylor Spivey (USA)	56:59

French Riviera, 31 August 2025
Position	Athlete	Time
1	Cassandre Beaugrand (FRA)	56:43
2	Jeanne Lehair (LUX)	56:49
3	Léonie Périault (FRA)	57:00
4	Emma Lombardi (FRA)	57:03
5	Beth Potter (GBR)	57:10
6	Nina Eim (GER)	57:11
7	Taylor Spivey (USA)	57:15
8	Tanja Neubert (GER)	57:21
9	Tilda Månsson (SWE)	57:25
10	Anna Godoy (ESP)	57:31

Karlovy Vary, 14 September 2025
Position	Athlete	Time
1	Beth Potter (GBR)	2:02:12
2	Taylor Spivey (USA)	2:02:25
3	Lisa Tertsch (GER)	2:03:07
4	Jeanne Lehair (LUX)	2:03:56
5	Léonie Périault (FRA)	2:04:15
6	Jolien Vermeylen (BEL)	2:04:32
7	Anna Godoy (ESP)	2:04:53
8	Tereza Zimovjanova (CZE)	2:05:00
9	Olivia Mathias (GBR)	2:05:18
10	Sian Rainsley (GBR)	2:05:46

Weihai, 27 September 2025
Position	Athlete	Time
1	Lisa Tertsch (GER)	2:04:42
2	Beth Potter (GBR)	2:04:59
3	Georgia Taylor-Brown (GBR)	2:05:40
4	Tanja Neubert (GER)	2:05:55
5	Kate Waugh (GBR)	2:06:00
6	Gwen Jorgensen (USA)	2:06:08
7	Rosa Tapia (MEX)	2:06:17
8	Gina Sereno (USA)	2:06:26
9	Alice Betto (ITA)	2:06:34
10	Jeanne Lehair (LUX)	02:06:46

Wollongong, 18 October 2025 Grand Final
Position	Athlete	Time
1	Lisa Tertsch (GER)	1:56:50
2	Bianca Seregni (ITA)	1:57:04
3	Emma Lombardi (FRA)	1:57:16
4	Léonie Périault (FRA)	1:57:21
5	Jessica Fullagar (GBR)	1:57:28
6	Diana Isakova (AIN)	1:57:40
7	Taylor Spivey (USA)	1:57:47
8	Anna Godoy Contreras (ESP)	1:57:49
9	Tanja Neubert (GER)	1:57:51
10	Jolien Vermeylen (BEL)	1:57:58
11	Tilly Anema (GBR)	1:58:32
12	Sian Rainsley (GBR)	1:58:39
13	Miriam Casillas García (ESP)	1:58:43
14	Maria Velasquez (COL)	1:58:51
15	Gina Sereno (USA)	1:58:52
16	Beth Potter (GBR)	1:59:05
17	Djenyfer Arnold (BRA)	1:59:09
18	Sophie Linn (AUS)	1:59:10
19	Danielle Orie (USA)	1:59:13
20	Maria Tomé (POR)	1:59:28

== Overall points totals ==
After Grand Final, 19 October 2025 - Final scores.:

Men
Rank	Athlete	Total points
1st place, gold medalist(s)	Matthew Hauser (AUS)	4250
2nd place, silver medalist(s)	Miguel Hidalgo (BRA)	3769.95
3rd place, bronze medalist(s)	Vasco Vilaca (POR)	3690.12
4	Henry Graf (GER)	3381.36
5	David Cantero (ESP)	3090.05
6	Csongor Lehmann (HUN)	2688.49
7	Alessio Crociani (ITA)	2660.96
8	Max Studer (SUI)	2496.48
9	Luke Willian (AUS)	2395.27
10	Charles Paquet (CAN)	2344.72
11	Dorian Coninx (FRA)	2341.19
12	Ricardo Batista (POR)	2089.91
13	Diego Moya (CHI)	1887.96
14	Tyler Mislawchuk (CAN)	1867.99
15	Adrien Briffod (SUI)	1776.92
16	Roberto Sanchez Mantecon (ESP)	1752.71
17	John Reed (USA)	1741.27
18	Miguel Tiago Silva (POR)	1689.57
19	Léo Bergere (FRA)	1647.08
20	Morgan Pearson (USA)	1643.62
21	Connor Bentley (GBR)	1634.06
22	Max Stapley (GBR)	1524.33
23	Hayden Wilde (NZL)	1495.84
24	Harry Leleu (GBR)	1366.66
25	Márk Dévay (HUN)	1306.7
26	Jack Willis (GBR)	1297.26
27	Ben Dijkstra (GBR)	1259.76
28	Chase McQueen (USA)	1237.62
29	Tjebbe Kaindl (AUT)	1230.64
30	Valentin Wernz (GER)	1169.19
31	Mitch Kolkman (NED)	1065.61
32	Brandon Copeland (AUS)	1055.23
33	Takumi Hojo (JPN)	1051.82
34	Tom Richard (FRA)	990.2
35	Callum McClusky (AUS)	982.23
36	Darr Smith (USA)	916.49
37	Seth Rider (USA)	915.92
38	Ian Pennekamp (NED)	909.23
39	Hugo Milner (GBR)	889.29
40	Sebastian Wernersen (NOR)	857.64

Women
Rank	Athlete	Total points
1st place, gold medalist(s)	Lisa Tertsch (GER)	3886.26
2nd place, silver medalist(s)	Léonie Périault (FRA)	3577.04
3rd place, bronze medalist(s)	Beth Potter (GBR)	3313.18
4	Taylor Spivey (USA)	3125.85
5	Bianca Seregni (ITA)	3069.93
6	Jeanne Lehair (LUX)	2979.32
7	Cassandre Beaugrand (FRA)	2925
8	Diana Isakova (AIN)	2832.96
9	Jolien Vermeylen (BEL)	2738.35
10	Tanja Neubert (GER)	2612.89
11	Emma Lombardi (FRA)	2440.4
12	Anna Godoy Contreras (ESP)	2270.62
13	Olivia Mathias (GBR)	2008.23
14	Tilda Månsson (SWE)	1847.47
15	Rosa Maria Tapia Vidal (MEX)	1811
16	Nina Eim (GER)	1795.13
17	Sian Rainsley (GBR)	1754.1
18	Maria Tomé (POR)	1638.66
19	Djenyfer Arnold (BRA)	1567.06
20	Annika Koch (GER)	1519.23
21	Gina Sereno (USA)	1439.85
22	Maya Kingma (NED)	1416.47
23	Jessica Fullagar (GBR)	1406.68
24	Tereza Zimovjanova (CZE)	1338.53
25	Alissa Konig (SUI)	1182.87
26	Yuko Takahashi (JPN)	1122.88
27	Miriam Casillas García (ESP)	1114.67
28	Emy Legault (CAN)	1110.98
29	Tilly Anema (GBR)	1084.9
30	Maria Carolina Velasquez Soto (COL)	1081.15
31	Kate Waugh (GBR)	1049.01
32	Verena Steinhauser (ITA)	998.38
33	Desirae Ridenour (CAN)	979.18
34	Ilaria Zane (ITA)	973.16
35	Gwen Jorgensen (USA)	910.98
36	Erika Ackerlund (USA)	900.87
37	Márta Kropkó (HUN)	868.38
38	Eva Goodisson (NZL)	841.37
39	Sophia Howell (CAN)	839.18
40	Franka Rust (GER)	835.16

== Mixed relay ==
Two mixed relay events were held for elite athletes as part of the Championship Series, the second of which, the Hamburg leg, was designated the World Championship race for 2025. Australia won their first title since 2017 and second overall in the mixed relay format.

Event	Gold	Silver	Bronze
Abu Dhabi, UAE	Germany; Selina Klamt; Jan Diener; Tanja Neubert; Henry Graf	United States; Taylor Spivey; John Reed; Erika Ackerlund; Morgan Pearson	Italy; Alice Betto; Nicola Azzano; Bianca Seregni; Euan de Nigro
Hamburg, Germany World Mixed Relay Championship	Australia; Sophie Linn; Luke Willian; Emma Jeffcoat; Matthew Hauser	France; Léonie Périault; Yanis Seguin; Cassandre Beaugrand; Dorian Coninx	Germany; Lisa Tertsch; Lasse Nygaard Priester; Tanja Neubert; Henry Graf

== List of 2025 World Championship podiums ==
The following is a list of all the World Championship medalists (not including para-triathlon; see below) crowned on the various legs of the World Triathlon Championship series. The majority of those disciplines outside the elite men's and women's events were decided in single championship races in Wollongong, Australia, in the lead up to the Championship Series Grand final. The Elite mixed relay world championship was held at the Hamburg leg of the World Triathlon Championship series. While three of the Championship Series legs were in sprint format, no specific Elite sprint distance championship was designated in 2025.

=== Elite ===
Event	Gold	Silver	Bronze
Elite
Men's individual Season long	Matthew Hauser; Australia	Miguel Hidalgo; Brazil	Vasco Vilaça; Portugal
Women's individual Season long	Lisa Tertsch; Germany	Léonie Périault; France	Beth Potter; Great Britain
Under 23
Men's individual Wollongong, Australia	Oliver Conway; Great Britain	Márton Kropkó; Hungary	Euan De Nigro; Italy
Women's individual Wollongong, Australia	Richelle Hill; Australia	Angelica Prestia; Italy	Márta Kropkó; Hungary
Junior
Men's individual Wollongong, Australia	Tristan Douche; France	Alex Robin; Great Britain	Ignacio Flores Arana; Chile
Women's individual Wollongong, Australia	Leá Houart; France	Fanni Szalai; Hungary	Diana Dunajska; Slovakia
Mixed relay
Hamburg, Germany World Mixed Relay Championship	Australia; Sophie Linn; Luke Willian; Emma Jeffcoat; Matthew Hauser	France; Léonie Périault; Yanis Seguin; Cassandre Beaugrand; Dorian Coninx	Germany; Lisa Tertsch; Lasse Nygaard Priester; Tanja Neubert; Henry Graf
Wollongong, Australia World Jr/U23 Mixed Relay Championship	Great Britain; Bethany Cook; Alex Robin; Millie Breese; Oliver Conway	Netherlands; Barbara de Koning; Gjalt Panjer; Robin Dreijling; Mitch Kolkman	Australia; Richelle Hill; Oscar Wootton; Tara Sosinski; Brayden Mercer

=== Medal table ===
* Host nation (Australia)

World Triathlon Championships medal table (elite)
Rank	Nation	Gold	Silver	Bronze	Total
1	Australia*	3	0	1	4
2	France	2	2	0	4
3	Great Britain	2	1	1	4
4	Germany	1	0	1	2
5	Hungary	0	2	1	3
6	Italy	0	1	1	2
7	Brazil	0	1	0	1
7	Netherlands	0	1	0	1
9	Chile	0	0	1	1
9	Portugal	0	0	1	1
9	Slovakia	0	0	1	1
Totals (11 entries)		8	8	8	24

=== Age-grade (champions only) ===
The following list is of the age-grade champions crowned at a World Triathlon Championship Series event, specifically the Grand Final at Wollongong. Championship races held outside the WTCS format, and the Para-triathlon World Championship races are not included.

Age-grade	Men's standard	Women's standard	Men's sprint	Women's sprint	Men's aquabike	Women's aquabike
Age-grade	Wollongong, Australia					
18-19	John Fothergill; Australia	Isabella Farkas; Australia	Ben Devries; Australia	Sienna Carter; United States	Connor Brink; Australia	Chloe Denning; Australia
20-24	Kye Robinson; Australia	Lara Dawson; Australia	Will Taylor; New Zealand	Lara Dawson; Australia	Benjamin Dibden; Australia	Harriet Trubshaw; Ireland
25-29	Kester McQueen; South Africa	Flora Johnson; Great Britain	Aaron McKenzie; Australia	Claire Dedden; Australia	Felix Paruzek; Australia	Hannah Gibson; Australia
30-34	Jesse Thompson; Australia	Lauren Burnham; Australia	Joris Aerden; Belgium	Sarah Howe; Australia	Anthony Wilson; Australia	Hayley Lyall; Australia
35-39	James Davy; Australia	Iris van der Staak; Netherlands	Phillipe Drolet; Canada	Penelope Nevill; Australia	Christo Ball; Australia	Bec Stedman; Australia
40-44	Richard Chambers; New Zealand	Briarna Silk; Australia	Thomas Winkelmann; Germany	Anna Russell; New Zealand	Trent Dawson; Australia	Hayley Davis; Great Britain
45-49	Travis Shields; Australia	Kirsten Sass; United States	Travis Shields; Australia	Kirsten Sass; United States	Hayden Armstrong; Australia	Nicola Taylor; Great Britain
50-54	Charles Ellis-Hallett; Australia	Suzanne Chandler; Canada	David Peedom; Australia	Stephanie Waring; Great Britain	Nigel Fanning; Ireland	Kim Taylor; New Zealand
55-59	Matt McKay; Australia	Michelle Jones; Australia	Grzegorz Zgliczynski; Poland	Michelle Jones; Australia	Wayne Simmons; Australia	Amanda Woodd; New Zealand
60-64	Graham Bruce; Australia	Linda Robb; United States	Christian Seymour; Australia	Sarah Northover; Great Britain	Drew McGill; United States	Catherine Frye; United States
65-69	John Cahill; United States	Robyn Williams; United States	Kieth Tufte; United States	Caroline Madden; Great Britain	Bernhard Mesicek; Austria	Kerry Newton; New Zealand
70-74	David McEwan; Australia	Joy Baker; New Zealand	David McEwan; Australia	Linda Meredith; Australia	Mark Preston; Australia	Mandy Meredith; Australia
75-79	Gerry McKeering; Australia	Sarah Barrett; Great Britain	Jean-Pierre Larrue; France	Jayne Mountford; Australia	Michael Dunne; Great Britain	Margaret Dalzeil; New Zealand
80-84	Steve Parnell; Australia	Peggy McDowell-Cramer; United States	Steve Parnell; Australia	Peggy Crome; Great Britain	Ken Murley; Australia	Janice Iredale; Australia

== World Triathlon Para Championships ==
2025 World Triathlon Para Championships
- League: World Triathlon Para Championships
- Sport: Paratriathlon

Men's Series
- World Champions: PTWC : Thomas Frühwirth; PTS2 : Jules Ribstein; PTS3 : Henry Urand; PTS4 : Alexis Hanquinquant; PTS5 : Chris Hammer; PTVI : Dave Ellis

Women's Series
- World Champions: PTWC : Lauren Parker; PTS2 : Anu Francis; PTS3 : Elise Marc; PTS4 : Camille Sénéclauze; PTS5 : Grace Norman; PTVI : Susana Rodriguez

Open mixed relay
- World Champions: United States (USA)

World Triathlon Para Championship seasons
- 2024 2026

The 2025 World Triathlon Para Championships, a series of single event championship races to crown world champions from para-triathlon will be held as part of the series of events around the 2025 World Triathlon Championship Series Grand Final in Wollongong, Australia. 13 events are held in 12 classifications, one more than at the 2024 Summer Paralympics, as the women's PTS2 and PTS3 classes are completed separately, not as a combined classification.

=== Medalists ===
Event	Gold	Silver	Bronze
Men's
PTWC	Thomas Frühwirth; Austria	Florian Brungraber; Austria	Louis Noël; France
PTS2	Jules Ribstein; France	Wim de Paepe; Belgium	Mohamed Lahna; United States
PTS3	Henry Urand; Great Britain	Ryan Taylor; Great Britain	Daniel Molina; Spain
PTS4	Alexis Hanquinquant; France	Pierre-Antoine Baele; France	Nil Riudavets; Spain
PTS5	Chris Hammer; United States	Jack Howell; Australia	Martin Schultz; Germany
PTVI	Dave Ellis; Great Britain	Antoine Perel; France	Lazar Filipović; Serbia
Women's
PTWC	Lauren Parker; Australia	Emelia Perry; United States	Jéssica Messali; Brazil
PTS2	Anu Francis; Australia	Hailey Danz; United States	Asumi Yasuda; Japan
PTS3	Elise Marc; France	Anna Plotnikova; Neutral Paralympic Athletes	Kenia Villalobos; Mexico
PTS4	Camille Sénéclauze; France	Danielle Cummings; United States	Hannah Macdougall; Australia
PTS5	Grace Norman; United States	Grace Brimelow; Australia	Lauren Steadman; Great Britain
PTVI	Susana Rodriguez; Spain	Francesca Tarantello; Italy	Anja Renner; Germany
Mixed relay
Open mixed PT relay	United States; Emelia Perry; Carson Clough; Grace Norman; Owen Cravens	Australia; Lauren Parker; Jeremy Peacock; Maggie Sandles; Jack Howell	Brazil; Jéssica Messali; Jorge Luis Fonseca; Letícia Freitas; Ruiter Antonio Gonçalves Silva

=== Medal table ===
* Host nation (Australia)

World Para-triathlon Championships medal table
Rank	Nation	Gold	Silver	Bronze	Total
1	France	4	2	1	7
2	United States	3	3	1	7
3	Australia*	2	3	1	6
4	Great Britain	2	1	1	4
5	Austria	1	1	0	2
6	Spain	1	0	2	3
7	Germany	0	1	1	2
8	Belgium	0	1	0	1
–	Neutral athletes	0	1	0	1
9	Brazil	0	0	2	2
10	Italy	0	0	1	1
10	Japan	0	0	1	1
10	Mexico	0	0	1	1
10	Serbia	0	0	1	1
Totals (13 entries)		13	13	13	39

== See also ==
- 2025 T100 Triathlon World Tour, the World Triathlon recognised elite global event organised by the Professional Triathletes Organisation and contested over the 100 kilometre format, approximately 2.5 times longer than WTCS events.
