= Triathlon at the 2024 Summer Paralympics – Men's PTS4 =

Men's PTS4 at the XVII Paralympic Games
- Venue: Pont Alexandre III
- Dates: 1 September 2024
- Competitors: 13 from 8 nations

Medalists
| 1st place, gold medalist(s) | | Alexis Hanquinquant | France |
| 2nd place, silver medalist(s) | | Carson Clough | United States |
| 3rd place, bronze medalist(s) | | Nil Riudavets Victory | Spain |

The Triathlon at the 2024 Summer Paralympics – Men's PTS4 event at the 2024 Paralympic Games took place at 07:15 CET on 1 September 2024 at Pont Alexandre III, Paris. 13 athletes representing 8 nations competed.

== Venue ==
The triathlon course will start from Pont Alexandre III bridge near Seine River and will end at the same place. The event will be over sprint distance. There will be 750 metre Swim through Seine River, 20 km para cycling at Champs-Élysées, Avenue Montaigne, crossing the Seine by the Pont des Invalides and reaching the Quai d'Orsay and last leg of 5 km run will end at Pont Alexandre III bridge.

== Results ==
| Rank | Bib | Athlete | Nationality | Swim | T1 | Bike | T2 | Run | Total Time | Notes |
|---|---|---|---|---|---|---|---|---|---|---|
| 1st place, gold medalist(s) | 424 | Alexis Hanquinquant | France | 9:35 | 1:24 | 29:48 | 0:33 | 16:41 | 58:01 | |
| 2nd place, silver medalist(s) | 425 | Carson Clough | United States | 10:42 | 1:07 | 31:05 | 0:30 | 17:23 | 1:00:47 | |
| 3rd place, bronze medalist(s) | 429 | Nil Riudavets Victory | Spain | 11:20 | 0:51 | 31:52 | 0:36 | 16:31 | 1:01:10 | |
| 4 | 426 | Pierre-Antoine Baele | France | 10:49 | 1:13 | 31:12 | 0:28 | 17:43 | 1:01:25 | |
| 5 | 431 | Gregoire Berthon | France | 10:38 | 0:58 | 31:08 | 0:37 | 19:42 | 1:03:03 | |
| 6 | 427 | Michael Taylor | Great Britain | 9:47 | 1:13 | 32:09 | 0:36 | 19:21 | 1:03:06 | |
| 7 | 428 | Antonio Franko | Croatia | 10:51 | 1:19 | 33:02 | 0:35 | 18:44 | 1:04:31 | |
| 8 | 430 | Jeremy Peacock | Australia | 11:42 | 1:00 | 32:43 | 0:33 | 19:03 | 1:05:01 | |
| 9 | 433 | Eric McElvenny | United States | 11:52 | 1:15 | 32:32 | 1:09 | 18:58 | 1:05:46 | |
| 10 | 435 | Alwjandro Sanchez | Spain | 11:48 | 1:12 | 32:50 | 0:36 | 19:38 | 1:06:04 | |
| 11 | 434 | Finley Jakes | Great Britain | 11:58 | 1:12 | 33:28 | 0:44 | 18:46 | 1:06:08 | |
| 12 | 436 | Hideki Uda | Japan | 14:07 | 1:11 | 32:19 | 0:54 | 18:31 | 1:07:02 | |
| 13 | 432 | Liam Twomey | Australia | 10:45 | 1:11 | 33:20 | 0:48 | 21:55 | 1:07:59 | |

Key : T = Transition
