= Kenia Villalobos =

Mexican paratriathlete (born 1999)

Personal information
- Full name: Kenia Yesenia Villalobos Vargas
- Born: 21 March 1999 (age 27) Aguascalientes, Mexico

Sport
- Sport: Paratriathlon
- Disability: Cerebral palsy
- Disability class: PTS3
Medal record
Women's paratriathlon
Representing Mexico
World Championships
Silver medal – second place	2023 Ponteverde	PTS3
Bronze medal – third place	2025 Wollongong	PTS3

Kenia Yesenia Villalobos Vargas (born 21 March 1999) is a Mexican paratriathlete. She represented Mexico at the 2024 Summer Paralympics.

== Career ==
Villalobos began her career in para-swimming before switching to paratriathlon in 2020 She competed at the 2023 World Triathlon Para Championships and won a silver medal in the PTS3 event with a time of 1:25.01. In September 2024, she competed at the 2024 Summer Paralympics and finished in eleventh place in the PTS4 paratriathlon with a time of 1:22:53. She competed at the 2025 World Triathlon Para Championships and won a bronze medal in the PST3 event.

== Personal life ==
Villalobos was diagnosed with cerebral palsy.
