= Brimelow =

Brimelow is a surname. Notable people with the surname include:

- Alison Brimelow (born 1949), former Chief Executive and Comptroller General of the United Kingdom Patent Office, and former President of the European Patent Office
- Ash Brimelow (born 1993), British DJ & Record Producer
- Grace Brimelow (born 2007), Australian para-triathlete
- Kirsty Brimelow (born 1969), British jurist
- Peter Brimelow (born 1947), British-American financial journalist, author, and right-wing political activist
- Thomas Brimelow, Baron Brimelow (1915–1995), British diplomat
