= Danielle Cummings =

American paratriathlete (born 1997)

Personal information
- Home town: Albuquerque, New Mexico, U.S.

Sport
- Sport: Paratriathlon
- Disability class: PTS4
Medal record
Women's paratriathlon
Representing the United States
World Championships
| Silver medal – second place | 2025 Wollongong | PTS4 |
Americas Championships
| Silver medal – second place | 2025 Calima | PTS4 |

Danielle Cummings is an American paratriathlete.

== Career ==
Cummings made her paratriathlon debut at the 2024 USA Paratriathlon National Championships and won a gold medal in the PTS4 event with a time of 1:32:53. In October 2025, she made her international debut at the 2025 World Triathlon Para Championships and won a silver medal in the PST4 event with a time of 1:19:44.

== Personal life ==
In 2017, Cummings fell 20 feet while rock climbing and shattered her talus bone and caused severe damage to her ankle. She suffered chronic pain and loss of mobility in her ankle. In July 2023, she elected for a left below-knee amputation. She is a medical student at the University of New Mexico School of Medicine.
