= Triathlon at the 2017 Island Games =

- Dates: June 24 – 30
- Host city: Gotland, Sweden
- Venue: Kallbadhuset, Visby
- Level: Senior
- Events: 2

Triathlon for the 2017 Island Games was held at the Kallbadhuset, Visby, Gotland, Sweden in June 2017.

== Medal table ==
Rank	Nation	Gold	Silver	Bronze	Total
1	Jersey	4	0	1	5
2	Guernsey	0	2	0	2
3	Faroe Islands	0	1	0	1
3	Menorca	0	1	0	1
5	Gibraltar	0	0	1	1
5	Orkney	0	0	1	1
5	Shetland	0	0	1	1
Totals (7 entries)		4	4	4	12

== Results ==
Event	Gold		Silver		Bronze	
Men's	Daniel Haksworth; Jersey	1:45:00.2	Nil Riudavets Victory; Menorca	1:46:46.9	Bobby Oag; Orkney	1:46:59.9
Men's Team	Jersey; Daniel Halksworth; Demri Mitchell; Richard Tanguy; Oliver Turner	5:26:03.10	Guernsey; Ben Creasey; Daniel Galpin; Bob Guilbert; Joshua Lewis; Alan Rowe; Max Thornton; James Travers	5:29:04.70	Gibraltar; Richard Robert David Blagg; Mark Francis; Andrew Gordon; Edgar Harper; Keith Laguea; Robert Matto; Samuel O'Shea; Christopher Walker	5:34:35.30
Women's	Joanne Gorrod (JEY)	1:59:43.3	Anna Karina Ottosen (FRO)	2:02:14.5	Melissa Messervey-Gross (JEY)	02:02:35.2
Women's Team	Jersey; Joanne Gorrod; Claire Kybett; Melissa Messervy-Gross; Katie Silva	6:12:13.20	Guernsey; Amy Critchlow; Laura McCarthy; Magdalena Puzio	6:29:22.60	Shetland; Wendy Hatrick; Lynsey Henderson; Shelley Humphray; Catherine Williamson	6:54:09.30
