= Emelia Perry =

American para-cyclist (born 1992)

Personal information
- Nationality: American
- Born: November 23, 1992 (age 33) Philadelphia, Pennsylvania, U.S.
- Education: Ursinus College

Sport
- Sport: Para-cycling, paratriathlon
- Disability class: Para-cycling (H4); Paratriathlon (PTWC)
Medal record
Representing the United States
Women's para-cycling
Road World Championships
Silver medal – second place	2025 Ronse	Time trial H4
Silver medal – second place	2025 Ronse	Road race H4
Women's paratriathlon
World Championships
Gold medal – first place	2025 Wollongong	Mixed relay
Silver medal – second place	2025 Wollongong	PTWC
Bronze medal – third place	2026 Pontevedra	PTWC

Emelia Perry (born November 23, 1992) is an American para-cyclist and paratriathlete. She represented the United States at the 2024 Summer Paralympics.

== Early life ==
Perry was born in Philadelphia, Pennsylvania, and moved with her family to Osaka, Japan when she was a baby. In 2011, she moved back to the United States to attend Ursinus College to study exercise science. She attended college on a running scholarship, where she competed on the cross country and track teams.

On June 9, 2017, Perry fell from a fire escape ladder while hosting a party on the roof of her Philadelphia apartment. She fractured her T12 vertebra as a result of her fall.

== Career ==
Following her injury Perry started competing in wheelchair racing, and in 2022 she started competing in paratriathlon. She represented the United States at the 2024 Summer Paralympics in paratriathlon and finished in fifth place with a time of 1:14:03.

In August 2025, she represented the United States at the 2025 UCI Para-cycling Road World Championships and won silver medals in the time trial and road race H4 events. In October 2025, she competed at the 2025 World Triathlon Para Championships and won a gold medal in the mixed team relay and a silver medal in the PTWC event.
