= David Bryant (triathlete) =

Australian triathlete and Paralympian

Personal information
- Born: 4 January 1989 (age 37)

Sport
- Country: Australia
- Sport: Men's paratriathlon
- Disability class: PTS5
Medal record
Men's paratriathlon
Representing Australia
Oceania Championships
| Gold medal – first place | 2020 Newcastle | PTS5 |
| Gold medal – first place | 2022 Stockton | PTS5 |
| Gold medal – first place | 2023 Stockton | PTS5 |
| Gold medal – first place | 2025 Mooloolaba | PTS5 |
| Silver medal – second place | 2024 Stockton | PTS5 |

David Bryant (born 4 January 1989) is an elite Australian triathlete with a disability. He represented Australia at the 2020 Tokyo Paralympics and the 2024 Paris Paralympics .

== Personal ==
Byant was born on 4 January 1989. He was born with a clubfoot in his right leg which sees him compete with a muscle mass differential of approximately 17% less than that of his left leg. He is an Accredited Practising Dietitian and Advanced Sports Dietitian. He has worked as a personal trainer. In 2021, he lives in Perth.

== Career ==
In 2019, Bryant was categorised in para triathlon as PTS5. His para-triathlon journey started with a humble 20-minute jog as part of rehabilitation from leg surgery.Since 2019, he was won Australian and Oceania events in his classification. Bryant competed at the 2020 Summer Paralympics in PTS5 and finished seventh with a time of 1:02.30.

He was ranked seventh in Men's PTS5 going into the 2024 Paris Paralympics where he finished eight.

At the 2025 World Triathlon Para Championships in Wollongong, he finished ninth in the Men's PTS5.

In 2021, he was a Western Australian Institute of Sport scholarship athlete.
