= Anja Renner =

German paratriathlete

Personal information
- Nationality: German
- Born: 24 July 1986 (age 40) Neuburg an der Donau, Germany
- Height: 1.76 m (5 ft 9 in)
- Weight: 57 kg (126 lb)
- Website: anja-renner.com/en/

Sport
- Country: Germany
- Sport: Paratriathlon
- Club: 1.FC Nürnberg Schwimmen
Medal record
Women's paratriathlon
Representing Germany
Paralympic Games
Bronze medal – third place	2024 Paris	PTVI
World Championships
Bronze medal – third place	2025 Wollongong	PTVI
Bronze medal – third place	2026 Pontevedra	PTVI
European Championships
Bronze medal – third place	2024 Vichy	PTVI
World Triathlon Para Series
Gold medal – first place	2024 Devonport	PTVI
World Para Cups
Gold medal – first place	2023 Alhandra	PTVI
Gold medal – first place	2023 Paris	PTVI
Bronze medal – third place	2023 A Coruna	PTVI

Anja Renner (born 24 July 1986) is a German paratriathlete competing in the PTVI classification (visual impairment). She won the bronze medal in the triathlon at the 2024 Paralympic Games in Paris.

== Early life ==
Anja Renner was born in Neuburg an der Donau with a hearing impairment and was diagnosed with Usher syndrome at the age of 25, a condition affecting both hearing and vision. Due to retinitis pigmentosa, she gradually lost her eyesight and now has less than 10% of her vision remaining. Despite these challenges, she began her triathlon journey at the age of 30, inspired by her husband. She successfully competed in sprint and Olympic distances and qualified for the Ironman 70.3 World Championship. However, due to her progressive vision loss and the physical demands of the sport, she had to forgo participation in the Ironman World Championship in Hawaii.

== Career in Paratriathlon ==
In February 2023, Renner transitioned to para sports, setting the ambitious goal of qualifying for the 2024 Paralympic Games in Paris within 18 months. She joined the German national team and competed in international events such as the World Triathlon Para Series, World Cups, and World and European Championships. Under the guidance of coaches Tobias Haumann and Ute Schäfer, she continuously improved her performance. At the 2024 Paralympic Games in Paris, she won the bronze medal in the PTVI triathlon alongside her guide athlete Maria Paulig.

== Personal life ==
Anja Renner lives in Gmund am Tegernsee. Before her athletic career, she worked as a biotechnology engineer in cancer research. She is a member of the 1. FC Nürnberg Swimming Club and is actively involved in promoting paratriathlon in Germany.
