= 2023 Australian Swimming Trials =

Australia swimming competition

- Host city: Melbourne, Victoria
- Date: 13–18 June
- Venue: Melbourne Sports and Aquatic Centre
- Events: 56 (men: 28; women: 28)

The 2023 Australian Swimming Trials was held from 13 to 18 June 2023 at the Melbourne Sports and Aquatic Centre in Melbourne, Victoria to determine Australia's swimming team for the 2023 World Aquatics Championships in Fukuoka, Japan.

A host of Dolphins missed the event and World Championship selection due to injury, including 2020 Olympian Chelsea Hodges who required surgery to repair torn cartilage in her right hip. William Yang also missed the event after undergoing surgery to remove a benign tumour in his spinal canal. Breaststroker Jenna Strauch is another withdrawal from the event having not overcome a knee injury, while Zac Incerti will not compete after having commenced a shoulder rehabilitation program. Ben Armbruster was a late withdrawal from the meet with a rib injury.

On the final day of the event, Swimming Australia selected a 38-person team. The team consists of 31 aquatic swimmers and 8 open water swimmers. Moesha Johnson will swim in both disciplines, having qualified in the 1500m freestyle and 5km open water events. Bianca Crisp, Kai Taylor and Jack Wilson are set to make their Dolphins debut in Fukuoka.

== Schedule ==
Legend
Key	H	½	F	TF
Value	Heats	Semifinals	Final	Timed final

M = Morning session, E = Evening session

Men
Date →	13 June		14 June		15 June		16 June		17 June		18 June	
Event ↓	M	E	M	E	M	E	M	E	M	E	M	E
50 m freestyle											H	F
100 m freestyle							H	F				
200 m freestyle			H	F								
400 m freestyle	H	F										
800 m freestyle					TF	TF						
1500 m freestyle									TF	TF		
50 m backstroke							H	F				
100 m backstroke			H	F								
200 m backstroke									H	F		
50 m breaststroke					H	F						
100 m breaststroke	H	F										
200 m breaststroke									H	F		
50 m butterfly			H	F								
100 m butterfly											H	F
200 m butterfly					H	F						
200 m individual medley							H	F				
400 m individual medley											H	F

Men Multi-Class
Date →	13 June		14 June		15 June		16 June		17 June		18 June	
Event ↓	M	E	M	E	M	E	M	E	M	E	M	E
50 m freestyle						TF						
100 m freestyle		TF										
200 m freestyle			TF									
400 m freestyle			TF									
50 m backstroke					TF							
100 m backstroke	TF											
50 m breaststroke		TF										
100 m breaststroke			TF									
50 m butterfly	TF											
100 m butterfly				TF								
200 m individual medley					TF							

Women
Date →	13 June		14 June		15 June		16 June		17 June		18 June	
Event ↓	M	E	M	E	M	E	M	E	M	E	M	E
50 m freestyle											H	F
100 m freestyle									H	F		
200 m freestyle					H	F						
400 m freestyle	H	F										
800 m freestyle							TF	TF				
1500 m freestyle											TF	TF
50 m backstroke									H	F		
100 m backstroke			H	F								
200 m backstroke							H	F				
50 m breaststroke							H	F				
100 m breaststroke			H	F								
200 m breaststroke									H	F		
50 m butterfly					H	F						
100 m butterfly	H	F										
200 m butterfly							H	F				
200 m individual medley	H	F										
400 m individual medley											H	F

Women Multi-Class
Date →	13 June		14 June		15 June		16 June		17 June		18 June	
Event ↓	M	E	M	E	M	E	M	E	M	E	M	E
50 m freestyle						TF						
100 m freestyle		TF										
200 m freestyle			TF									
400 m freestyle			TF									
50 m backstroke					TF							
100 m backstroke	TF											
50 m breaststroke		TF										
100 m breaststroke			TF									
50 m butterfly	TF											
100 m butterfly				TF								
200 m individual medley					TF							

== Qualification criteria ==
Swimming Australia will select a 56-person team, with a maximum of 28 male athletes and 28 females athletes. The first and second placed swimmers in the open final of any individual Olympic event will be selected provided they meet qualification times set out below by Swimming Australia.

Men	Event	Women
21.83	50 m freestyle	24.70
47.96	100 m freestyle	53.61
1:46.06	200 m freestyle	1:56.87
3:46.47	400 m freestyle	4:06.44
7:47.46	800 m freestyle	8:26.71
14:56.86	1500 m freestyle	16:09.09
53.00	100 m backstroke	59.99
1:57.12	200 m backstroke	2:10.07
59.49	100 m breaststroke	1:06.40
2:09.68	200 m breaststroke	2:23.91
51.28	100 m butterfly	57.91
1:54.91	200 m butterfly	2:07.89
1:57.74	200 m IM	2:10.72
4:12.50	400 m IM	4:38.53

== Medal winners ==
The medallist for the open events are below.

=== Men ===
Event	Gold		Silver		Bronze	
50 metre freestyle	Cameron McEvoy; Somerville House (Qld)	21.41 Q	Thomas Nowakowski; Somerset (Qld)	21.89	Isaac Cooper; St Andrew's (Qld)	22.00
100 metre freestyle	Kyle Chalmers; Marion (SA)	47.44 Q	Flynn Southam; Bond (Qld)	47.77 Q	Jack Cartwright; St Peters Western (Qld)	48.50
200 metre freestyle	Kai Taylor; St Peters Western (Qld)	1:46.25	Alexander Graham; Miami (Qld)	1:46.68	Thomas Neill; Rackley (Qld)	1:46.82
400 metre freestyle	Samuel Short; Rackley (Qld)	3:43.38 Q	Elijah Winnington; St Peters Western (Qld)	3:43.48 Q	Mack Horton; Griffith University (Qld)	3:46.71
800 metre freestyle	Samuel Short; Rackley (Qld)	7:40.39 ACR Q	Elijah Winnington; St Peters Western (Qld)	7:45.75 Q	Matthew Galea; SOPAC (NSW)	7:53.33
1500 metre freestyle	Samuel Short; Rackley (Qld)	14:46.67 Q	Elijah Winnington; St Peters Western (Qld)	15:08.28	Nick Sloman; Noosa (Qld)	15:11.72
50 metre backstroke	Isaac Cooper; St Andrew's (Qld)	24.56	James Bayliss; Chandler (Qld)	25.32	Lewis Blacburn; St Andrew's (Qld)	25.38
100 metre backstroke	Isaac Cooper; St Andrew's (Qld)	53.46	Bradley Woodward; Mingara (NSW)	53.85	Joshua Edwards-Smith; Griffith University (Qld)	54.52
200 metre backstroke	Bradley Woodward; Mingara (NSW)	1:56.04 Q	Joshua Edwards-Smith; Griffith University (Qld)	1:57.29	Ty Hartwell; Chandler (Qld)	1:58.88
50 metre breaststroke	Samuel Williamson; Melbourne Vicentre (Vic)	27.17	Haig Buckingham; SOPAC (NSW)	27.53	Nash Wilkes; Southport (Qld)	27.72
100 metre breaststroke	Zac Stubblety-Cook; Chandler (Qld)	59.68	Samuel Williamson; Melbourne Vicentre (Vic)	59.86	Joshua Yong; UWA West Coast (WA)	1:00.34
200 metre breaststroke	Zac Stubblety-Cook; Chandler (Qld)	2:07.86 Q	Haig Buckingham; SOPAC (NSW)	2:12.95	Angus Menzies; Knox Pymble (NSW)	2:13:13
50 metre butterfly	Cameron McEvoy; Somerville House (Qld)	23.07	Shaun Champion; Abbotsleigh (NSW)	23.46	Matthew Temple; Marion (SA)	23.47
100 metre butterfly	Matthew Temple; Marion (SA)	51.35	Kyle Chalmers; Marion (SA)	51.61	Shaun Champion; Abbotsleigh (NSW)	51.88
200 metre butterfly	Bowen Gough; Griffith University (Qld)	1:56.01	Harrison Turner; Chandler (Qld)	1:57.77	William Petric; Nunawading (Vic)	1:58.24
200 metre individual medley	Thomas Neill; Rackley (Qld)	1:57.74 Q	Brendon Smith; Griffith University (Qld)	1:58.84	William Petric; Nunawading (Vic)	1:59.29
400 metre individual medley	Brendon Smith; Griffith University (Qld)	4:10.64 Q	Thomas Neill; Rackley (Qld)	4:15.57	Thomas Hauck; All Saints (Qld)	4:19.07
WR World record | CR Commonwealth record | OC Oceanian record | AR Australian record | ACR Australian Allcomers record | Club Australian Club record

=== Men multi-class ===
Event	Gold		Silver		Bronze	
50 metre freestyle	Benjamin Hance S14; St Andrew's (Qld)	23.53	Tom Gallagher S10; Somerset (Qld)	23.85	Ricky Betar S14; Cruiz (ACT)	25.06
100 metre freestyle	Tom Gallagher S10; Somerset (Qld)	53.19	Alexander Tuckfield S10; Southern Sydney (NSW); Ricky Betar S14; Cruiz (ACT)	55.48 55.48		
200 metre freestyle	Samuel Gould S14; Helensvale (Qld)	2:04.96	Ricky Betar S14; Cruiz (ACT)	2:07.16	Alexander Tuckfield S10; Southern Sydney (NSW)	2:01.74
400 metre freestyle	Callum Simpson S8; Flinders Phoenix (Qld)	4:40.55	Harrison Vig S9; University of Queensland (Qld)	4:34.03	Beau Matthews S8; SLC Aquadot (NSW)	4:42.55
50 metre backstroke	Tom Gallagher S10; Somerset (Qld)	28.54	Ethan Blockey S14; Macksville Marlins (NSW)	32.90	Harrison Vig S9; University of Queensland (Qld)	32.56
100 metre backstroke	Benjamin Hance S14; St Andrew's (Qld)	56.73	Tom Gallagher S10; Somerset (Qld)	1:02.70	Ricky Betar S14; Cruiz (ACT)	1:03.56
50 metre breaststroke	Beau Matthews S8; SLC Aquadot (NSW)	37.53	Ahmed Kelly S3; Yarra Plenty (Vic)	1:01.29	Riley Blitz S19; Geelong (Vic)	34.93
100 metre breaststroke	Samuel Gould S14; Helensvale (Qld)	1:16.36	Beau Matthews S8; SLC Aquadot (NSW)	1:27.21	Riley Blitz S19; Geelong (Vic)	1:19.52
50 metre butterfly	Nicholas Layton S15; Propulsion (Vic)	25.37	Alex Saffy S10; Bunbury (Qld)	27.48	Samuel Gould S14; Helensvale (Qld)	29.43
100 metre butterfly	Alex Saffy S10; Bunbury (Qld)	57.95	Ricky Betar S14; Cruiz (ACT)	1:01.27	Nicholas Layton S15; Propulsion (Vic)	56.49
150 metre individual medley	Ahmed Kelly S3; Yarra Plenty (Vic)	3:12.24	None awarded			
200 metre individual medley	Ricky Betar S14; Cruiz (ACT)	2:18.61	Samuel Gould S14; Helensvale (Qld)	2:24.38	Callum Simpson S8; Flinders Phoenix (Qld)	2:39.47
WR World record | CR Commonwealth record | OC Oceanian record | AR Australian record | ACR Australian Allcomers record | Club Australian Club record

=== Women ===
Event	Gold		Silver		Bronze	
50 metre freestyle	Shayna Jack; St Peters Western (Qld)	24.22 Q	Emma McKeon; Griffith University	24.26 Q	Meg Harris; Marion (SA)	24.30
100 metre freestyle	Mollie O'Callaghan; St Peters Western (Qld)	52.48 Q	Emma McKeon; Griffith University	52.52 Q	Shayna Jack; St Peters Western (Qld)	52.64
200 metre freestyle	Mollie O'Callaghan; St Peters Western (Qld)	1:53.83 Q	Ariarne Titmus; St Peters Western (Qld)	1:54.14 Q	Lani Pallister; Griffith University (Qld)	1:56.03
400 metre freestyle	Ariarne Titmus; St Peters Western (Qld)	3:58.47 Q	Lani Pallister; Griffith University (Qld)	4:02.43 Q	Kiah Melverton; St Peters Western (Qld)	4:05.05
800 metre freestyle	Ariarne Titmus; St Peters Western (Qld)	8:15.88 Q	Lani Pallister; Griffith University (Qld)	8:20.56 Q	Kiah Melverton; St Peters Western (Qld)	8:26.65
1500 metre freestyle	Lani Pallister; Griffith University (Qld)	15:56.31 Q	Moesha Johnson; Griffith University (Qld)	16:03.02 Q	Madeleine Gough; Carlile (NSW)	16:21.68
50 metre backstroke	Bronte Job; Rackley (Qld)	27.73	Iona Anderson; Breakers (WA)	28.03	Layla Day; Bond (Qld)	28.47
100 metre backstroke	Kaylee McKeown; Griffith University (Qld)	57.50 Q	Mollie O'Callaghan; St Peters Western (Qld)	58.42 Q	Iona Anderson; Breakers (WA)	1:00.05
200 metre backstroke	Kaylee McKeown; Griffith University (Qld)	2:03.70 Q	Jenna Forrester; St Peters Western (Qld)	2:10.37	Hannah Fredericks; St Peters Western (Qld)	2:10.84
50 metre breaststroke	Abbey Harkin; St Peters Western (Qld)	31.14	Talara-Jade Dixon; St Hilda's (WA)	31.19	Mikayla Smith; Griffith University (Qld)	31.26
100 metre breaststroke	Abbey Harkin; St Peters Western (Qld)	1:07.20	Mikayla Smith; Griffith University (Qld)	1:07.94	Talara-Jade Dixon; St Hilda's (WA)	1:08.64
200 metre breaststroke	Abbey Harkin; St Peters Western (Qld)	2:23.93	Mikayla Smith; Griffith University (Qld)	2:26.08	Ella Ramsay; Chandler (Qld)	2:28.85
50 metre butterfly	Alexandria Perkins; USC Spartans (Qld)	25.92	Lily Price; Rackley (Qld)	25.97	Emma McKeon; Griffith University (Qld)	26.09
100 metre butterfly	Emma McKeon; Griffith University (Qld)	56.74 Q	Brianna Throssell; St Peters Western (Qld)	57.66 Q	Lily Price; Rackley (Qld)	57.78
200 metre butterfly	Elizabeth Dekkers; Chandler (Qld)	2:05.26 ACR Q	Abbey Connor; Revesby Workers (NSW)	2:07.61 Q	Brianna Throssell; St Peters Western (Qld)	2:07.68
200 metre individual medley	Kaylee McKeown; Griffith University (Qld)	2:07.60 Q	Jenna Forrester; St Peters Western (Qld)	2:09.29 Q	Ella Ramsay; Chandler (Qld)	2:11.89
400 metre individual medley	Jenna Forrester; St Peters Western (Qld)	4:34.89 Q	Kiah Melverton; St Peters Western (Qld)	4:39.65	Ella Ramsay; Chandler (Qld)	4:39.96
WR World record | CR Commonwealth record | OC Oceanian record | AR Australian record | ACR Australian Allcomers record | Club Australian Club record

=== Women multi-class ===
Event	Gold		Silver		Bronze	
50 metre freestyle	Jasmine Greenwood S10; Cruiz (ACT)	28.68	Keira Stephens S9; Southport (Qld)	28.79	Alexa Leary S9; St Hilda's (Qld)	28.14
100 metre freestyle	Alexa Leary S9; St Hilda's (Qld)	1:00.85	Jasmine Greenwood S10; Cruiz (ACT)	1:03.31	Victoria Belando Nicholson S9; Yeronga Park (Qld)	1:05.82
200 metre freestyle	Kael Thompson S14; Sunshine Coast Grammar (Qld)	2:22.58	Montana Atkinson S14; Helensvale (Qld)	2:23.27	Grace Brimelow S8; Sunshine Coast Grammar (Qld)	2:34.94
400 metre freestyle	Grace Brimelow S8; Sunshine Coast Grammar (Qld)	5:11.26	Hannah Price S10; Campbelltown (NSW)	5:04.73	Holly Warn S7; St Hilda's (Qld)	5:41.98
50 metre backstroke	Hannah Price S10; Campbelltown (NSW)	34.89	Montana Atkinson S14; Helensvale (Qld)	34.22	Victoria Belando Nicholson S9; Yeronga Park (Qld)	36.89
100 metre backstroke	Holly Warn S7; St Hilda's (Qld)	1:27.32	Hannah Price S10; Campbelltown (NSW)	1:13.75	Montana Atkinson S14; Helensvale (Qld)	1:14.41
50 metre breaststroke	Keira Stephens S9; Southport (Qld)	35.71	Tegan Reder S11; UWA West Coast (WA)	44.15	Jordan Berryman S8; UWA West Coast (WA)	42.61
100 metre breaststroke	Keira Stephens S9; Southport (Qld)	1:19.42	Tegan Reder S11; UWA West Coast (WA)	1:37.12	Amelie Springett-Kelly; City of Sydney (NSW)	1:49.67
50 metre butterfly	Montana Atkinson S14; Helensvale (Qld)	31.62	Victoria Belando Nicholson S9; Yeronga Park (Qld)	34.13	Jasmine Greenwood S10; Cruiz (ACT)	31.48
100 metre butterfly	Jasmine Greenwood S10; Cruiz (ACT)	1:10.23	Jasmin Fullgrabe S9; Marion (SA)	1:16.33	Montana Atkinson S14; Helensvale (Qld)	1:13.77
200 metre individual medley	Jasmine Greenwood S10; Cruiz (ACT)	2:36.93	Amelie Springett-Kelly; City of Sydney (NSW)	3:28.28	Montana Atkinson S14; Helensvale (Qld)	2:46.12
WR World record | CR Commonwealth record | OC Oceanian record | AR Australian record | ACR Australian Allcomers record | Club Australian Club record

Highlighted swimmers achieved the qualification time to be included in the team in the respective event.

== Records ==
During the 2023 Australian Swimming Trials the following records were set.

=== All Comers records ===
Event	Name (Previous)	Time (Previous)	Year	Location	Name (New)	Time (New)	Difference
800 m freestyle	(Australia) Ian Thorpe	7:41.59	2001	Hobart, Australia	(Australia) Samuel Short	7:40.39	-1.20
200 m butterfly	(Australia) Madeline Groves	2:05.41	2015	Sydney, Australia	(Australia) Elizabeth Dekkers	2:05.26	-0.15

== Team Selection ==
The following 38 swimmers were selected as part of the Dolphins team which was finalised on 18 June 2023.

Men	Women
Bailey Armstrong; Jack Cartwright; Kyle Chalmers; Shaun Champion; Isaac Cooper; Alexander Graham; Kyle Lee; Cameron McEvoy; Thomas Neill; Samuel Short; Nicholas Sloman; Brendon Smith; Flynn Southam; Zac Stubblety-Cook; Kai Taylor; Matthew Temple; Samuel Williamson; Jack Wilson; Elijah Winnington; Bradley Woodward	Abbey Connor; Bianca Crisp; Elizabeth Dekkers; Jenna Forrester; Maddy Gough; Chelsea Gubecka; Abbey Harkin; Meg Harris; Shayna Jack; Moesha Johnson; Emma McKeon; Kaylee McKeown; Kiah Melverton; Mollie O'Callaghan; Lani Pallister; Brianna Throssell; Ariarne Titmus; Madison Wilson

== Broadcast ==
In April 2023, it was announced that the Nine Network's streaming service 9Now had secured an exclusive broadcast streaming deal with Swimming Australia, after the network had previously committed to broadcasting the next five Olympic Games as well as the 2023 World Aquatics Championships in Fukuoka, Japan. The commentary team will be led by Matt Welsh, with every heat and final available to be streamed.
