= Joe Townsend =

UK paratriathlete

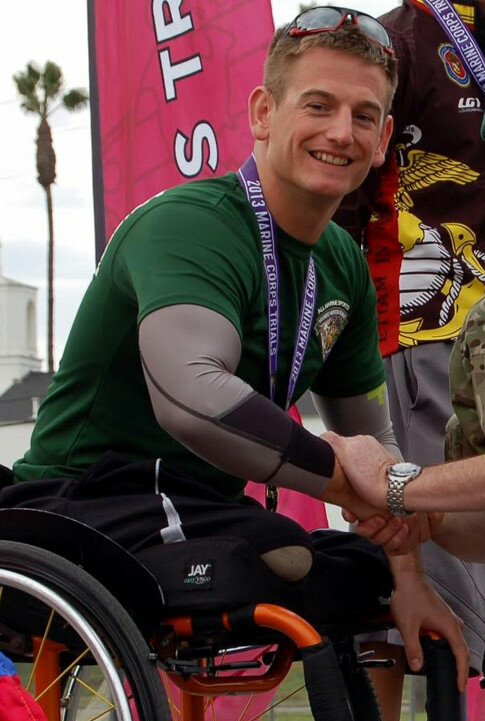
- Townsend in 2013

Personal information
- Full name: Joseph Townsend
- Nationality: British
- Born: 27 March 1988 (age 38) Eastbourne, England
Medal record
Men's para triathlon
Representing Great Britain
World Championships
Bronze medal – third place	2017 Rotterdam	PTWC
Bronze medal – third place	2018 Gold Coast	PTWC
European Championships
Silver medal – second place	2018 Tartu	PTWC
Bronze medal – third place	2012 Eilat	TRI 1
Bronze medal – third place	2013 Alanya	TRI 1
Bronze medal – third place	2014 Kitzbühel	PT1
Bronze medal – third place	2016 Lisbon	PT1
Representing England
Commonwealth Games
Gold medal – first place	2018 Gold Coast	PTWC Triathlon

Joseph Townsend (born 27 March 1988) is a British paratriathlete who competes in the PTWC classification. Townsend has won European and world medals as well as becoming Commonwealth Champion in 2018. He represented Great Britain at the 2016 Paralympic Games in Rio, where he finished sixth. Townsend has won the GBR Paratriathlon National Championships for four consecutive years- 2016, 2017, 2018, 2019. He lost both legs whilst serving in Afghanistan, after stepping on an IED in 2008. Joe Townsend is based in Eastbourne, England, where he was born.

== Personal life ==
Townsend was born and brought up in Eastbourne, England and attended Ratton School. He has a wife and child. Townsend is a UK Sport Lottery Funded paratriathlete and was based at the Loughborough Triathlon Performance Centre before he moved back to his hometown of Eastbourne after the 2016 Paralympic Games in Rio.

== Military service ==
Townsend served in the 40 Commando whilst in the Helmand Province of Afghanistan during Operation Herrick VII. On 8 February 2008, he stepped on a Taliban improvised explosive device in a field in the Upper Gereshk Valley whilst leading his patrol (from Delta Company) back to FOB Gibraltar. The base, built in 2007, was nicknamed 'the mouth of hell' by Taliban fighters and Townsend was one of 14 to be seriously injured there. He was then taken to Camp Bastion (where he underwent 14 hours of live-saving surgery), before being flown to the Selly Oak Hospital in Birmingham, where, what remained of his right leg was treated and left leg was amputated as it could not be saved. Townsend spent a total of five and half months including 6 weeks in intensive care at the hospital.

=== Rehabilitation ===
In July 2008, Townsend left the hospital to go to the Headley Court a Defense Medical Rehabilitation Centre in Surrey. He spent a total of 3 years at the centre, learning how to use his new prosthetic legs, whilst also undertaking further surgery at the hospital, receiving over 50 operations to date. At the rehabilitation centre, he was encouraged to compete in the Ironman Triathlon - 2.4 miles of swimming, 112 miles of cycling and 26 miles of running. The triathlon had never been completed by a disabled athlete at the time.

== Noel Edmonds ==
In February 2009 Noel Edmonds, on his Sky One show Noel's HQ, intervened on a planning permission denial by Wealden District Council for a specially adapted bungalow for his needs. This led to the then Prime Minister Gordon Brown calling on the council to reconsider their decision. The planning permission was given in March 2009 as a result.

== Sporting career ==
Having taken up paratriathlon in 2011 as part of his rehabilitation, Townsend went on to complete the Ironman UK triathlon in Bolton in July 2011 and then in 2012, he competed at the Ironman World Championships in Kona, Hawaii, where he finished second in the disability category. Townsend's first taste of international triathlon came in 2012 at the Eilat ETU Triathlon European Championships where he won a bronze medal. In 2013, he competed at his first GBR Paratriathlon National Championships, finishing 2nd. He also won a bronze medal at the 2013 Alanya ETU Triathlon European Championships. Townsend competed in the Invictus Games in 2014 and took home four gold medals from the 100m, 200m, 400m and 1500m disciplines on the athletics track. He also took part in the cycling and power lifting events. The 2014 season also saw him win a silver medal at the Yokohama ITU World Paratriathlon Event and three bronze medals at the Kitzbühel ETU Triathlon European Championships, GBR Paratriathlon National Championships and the Madrid ITU World Paratriathlon Event.

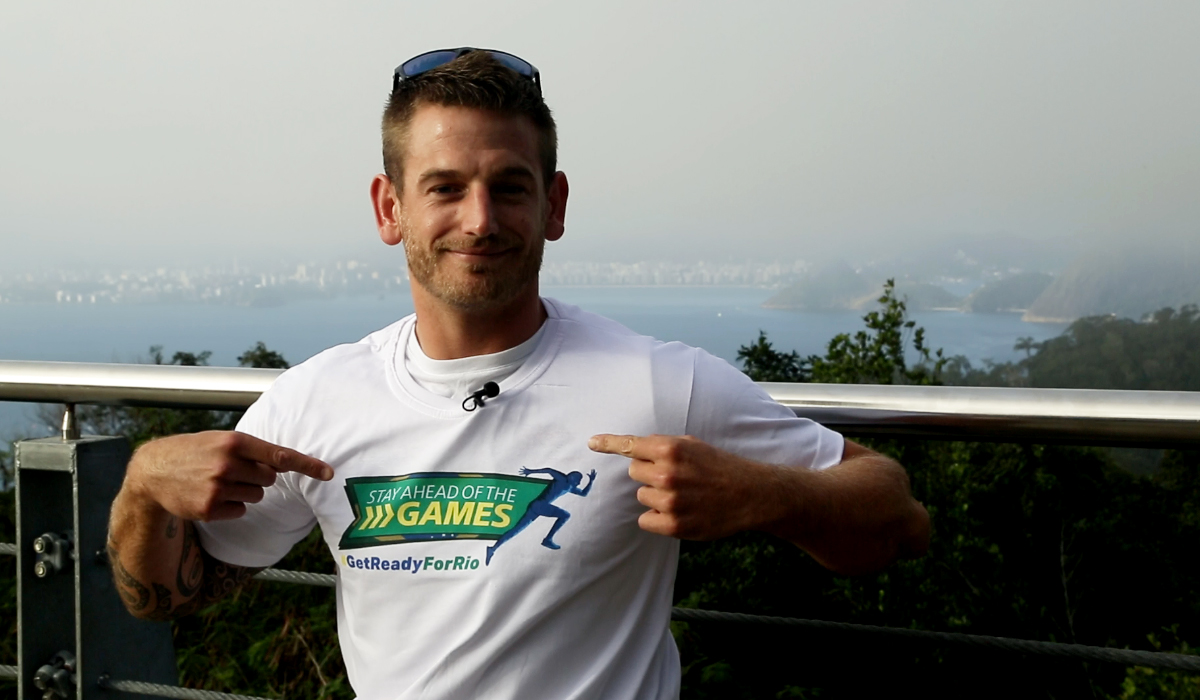
Townsend in Rio de Janeiro ahead of the 2016 Paralympic Games.

Townsend achieved further triathlon success in 2015 winning two silver medals at the GBR Paratriathlon National Championships and the Besançon ITU World Paratriathlon Event and a bronze medal at the Iseo - Franciacorta ITU World Paratriathlon Event. He made his Paralympic debut in triathlon at the 2016 Summer Paralympics in Rio de Janeiro, finishing sixth in the men's PT1 event. The 2016 season saw Townsend win a gold medal at the GBR Paratriathlon National Championships a silver medal at the Penrith ITU World Paratriathlon Event and two bronze medals at the Lisbon ETU Triathlon European Championships and Besançon ITU World Paratriathlon Event. He won his first global medal with a bronze at the ITU World Championships in Rotterdam in 2017 along with another gold medal at the GBR Paratriathlon National Championships and silver medal at the Edmonton ITU World Paratriathlon Series.

Townsend represented Team England at the 2018 Gold Coast Commonwealth Games, winning a gold medal in paratriathlon at its first time featuring in the Games. His success continued into the 2018 triathlon season as he made the podium in all of six of the competitions he entered that year winning gold at the GBR Paratriathlon National Championships and Eton Dorney ITU Paratriathlon World Cup, silver at the Tartu ETU Triathlon European Championships and bronze at the Yokohama ITU World Paratriathlon Series, Iseo - Franciacorta ITU World Paratriathlon Series and ITU World Triathlon Grand Final Gold Coast. Townsend was able to deliver several top five finishes in 2019 including victory in the PTWC Men's races at the GBR Paratriathlon National Championships and the Tokyo ITU Paratriathlon World Cup.

== Paratriathlon Competitions ==
The following list of results. Unless indicated otherwise, the competitions are paratriathlons.

Date	Competition	Rank
2019-09-14	Valencia ETU Paratriathlon European Championships	6
2019-09-01	ITU World Triathlon Grand Final Lausanne	4
2019-08-17	Tokyo ITU Paratriathlon World Cup	1
2019-06-28	Groupe Copley World Paratriathlon Series Montreal	4
2019-05-27	GBR Paratriathlon National Championships	1
2019-04-27	Milan ITU World Paratriathlon Series	5
2018-09-15	ITU World Triathlon Grand Final Gold Coast	3
2018-07-28	GBR Paratriathlon National Championships	1
2018-07-19	Tartu ETU Triathlon European Championships	2
2018-06-30	Iseo-Franciacorta ITU World Paratriathlon Series	3
2018-05-28	Eton Dorney ITU Paratriathlon World Cup	1
2018-05-12	Yokohama ITU World Paratriathlon Series	3
2018-04-07	Gold Coast Commonwealth Games	1
2017-09-15	ITU World Triathlon Grand Final Rotterdam	3
2017-08-28	GBR Paratriathlon National Championships	1
2017-07-28	Edmonton ITU World Paratriathlon Series	2
2017-05-13	Yokohama ITU World Paratriathlon Series	4

DNF = Did not finish

DNS = Did not start

DSQ = Disqualified
