= Lisa Tertsch =

German triathlete (born 1998)

- Tertsch in 2025

Personal information
- Nationality: German
- Born: 1 December 1998 (age 27) Offenbach am Main, Hesse, Germany

Sport
- Sport: Athletics, Triathlon
- Event: Cross country running
Medal record
Representing Germany
Women's triathlon
Olympic Games
Gold medal – first place	2024 Paris	Mixed relay
World Championships
Gold medal – first place	2024 Hamburg	Mixed relay
Gold medal – first place	2025 Wollongong	Individual
Bronze medal – third place	2025 Hamburg	Mixed relay
Women's cross country running
European Cross Country Championships
Bronze medal – third place	2018 Tilburg	U23 Team

Lisa Tertsch (born 1 December 1998) is a German triathlete and cross country runner.

== Early life and education ==
Tertsch was born in Offenbach am Main. She is a member of ASC Darmstadt. She studied economics at Harvard University, from 2016 until summer 2021. In an interview with the FAZ she said, that until then, studying had been her top priority; sport was second. 2021 was also the Olympic qualification for Olympics in Tokyo, which she missed by a hair and she realized that if she pursued sports half-heartedly, it would be difficult to compete against competitors who invested more into sports.

== Career ==
=== Junior career ===
In 2015, she won junior European Cup races in Quarteira in Portugal, and Bled, Slovenia, and silver in the mixed relay at the 2015 European Triathlon Championships. In April 2016, she won the European junior duathlon title in Kalkar. She was runner-up to Taylor Knibb at the 2016 Junior World Championships in Cozumel, Mexico. In July of that year she won the German junior national title in Nürnberg. She also won silver in the junior event at the 2016 European Triathlon Championships behind Cassandre Beaugrand.

=== Cross country ===
She won gold with the U23 women at the 2018 European Cross Country Championships in Tilburg. She placed fifth at the German Cross Country Championships in Darmstadt in November 2025.

=== Triathlon ===
In August 2019, she won bronze in the women's U23 race at the Triathlon World Championships in Lausanne, Switzerland. That year, she took first place at the U23 European Championships and was number one in the European Cup rankings at the end of the season. In February 2020, she was named ETU Athlete of the Year.

She became German champion over the triathlon sprint distance in Berlin in 2021 and again in Düsseldorf in 2023.

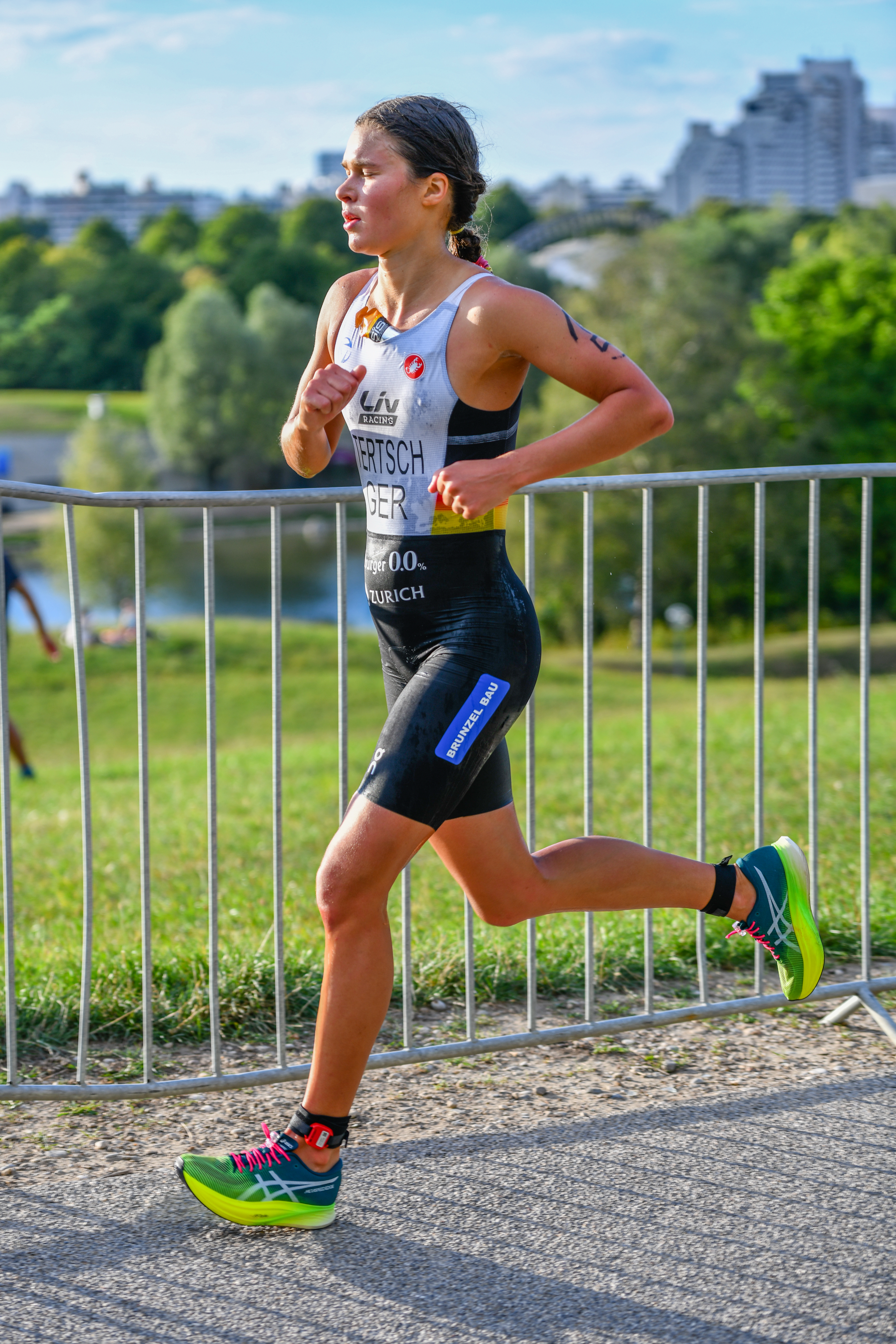
Tertsch in 2022

She won World Triathlon Championship Series bronze in Hamburg in the summer of 2022. She finished second at the World Triathlon Championship Series Hamburg in July 2024.

In July 2024, she was a gold medalist at the World Triathlon Mixed Relay Championships.

She competed at the 2024 Paris Olympics. In the individual race held on 31 July 2024, an early crash in the bike section put paid to hopes for medal but she came back to secure a top ten finish. Later at the Games she won a gold medal as part of the German mixed relay team. The following month, in her first race since the Olympics she won the Valencia World Cup.

Alongside Tanja Neubert, Lasse Nygaard and Henry Graf she was a bronze medalist at the 2025 World Triathlon Mixed Relay Championships.
