= Bill Chaffey (paratriathlete) =

Australian paratriathlete

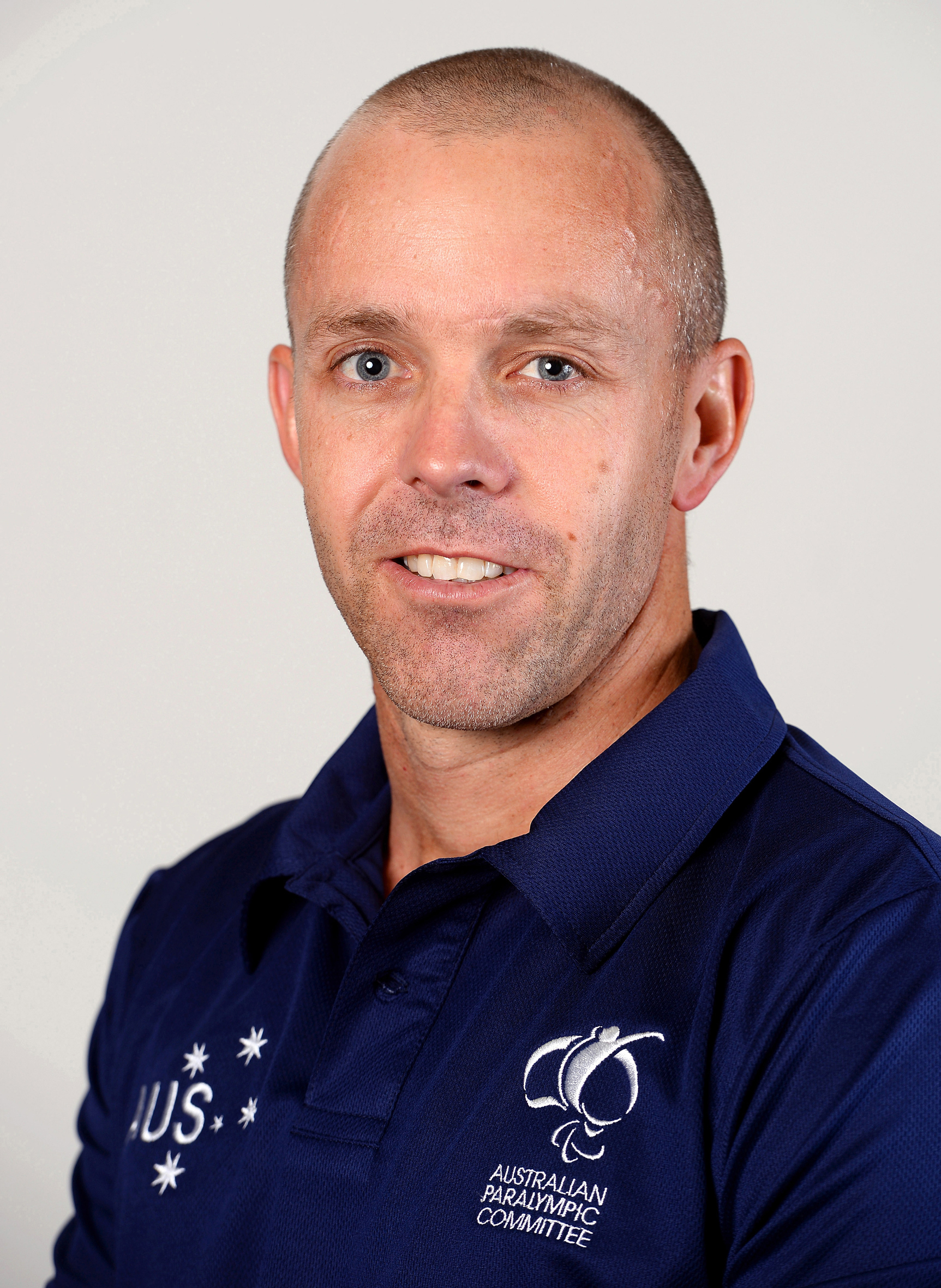
- 2016 Australian Paralympic team portrait

Personal information
- Nationality: Australian
- Born: 9 October 1975 (age 51) Tamworth, New South Wales

Sport
- Club: Tweed Valley Triathletes
Medal record
Representing Australia
Men's Paratriathlon
World Championships
Gold medal – first place	2009 Gold Coast	TRI 1
Gold medal – first place	2011 Beijing	TRI 1
Gold medal – first place	2012 Auckland	TRI 1
Gold medal – first place	2013 London	TRI 1
Gold medal – first place	2015 Chicago	PT1
Silver medal – second place	2010 Budapest	TRI 1
Ironman World Championship
Silver medal – second place	2013 Kailua-Kona	Handcycle
Oceania Championships
Gold medal – first place	2014 Penrith	PT1
Gold medal – first place	2015 Penrith	PT1
Gold medal – first place	2016 Devonport	PT1
Gold medal – first place	2017 Devonport	PTWC
Commonwealth Games
Bronze medal – third place	2018 Gold Coast	PTWC

Bill Chaffey (born 9 October 1975) is an Australian paratriathlete who won his fifth world championship in 2015. He represented Australia at the 2016 Rio Paralympics when paratriathlon made its debut at the Paralympics.

== Personal ==
Chaffey became an incomplete paraplegic when, as a non-disabled triathlete training for an Ironman Triathlon, he was hit by a truck while on his bicycle.

== Career ==
He competes in the PT1 (handcycle/racing wheelchair classification) (formerly TRI-1) and was TRI-1 Paratriathlon World Champion in 2009, 2011, 2012, 2013 and 2015. Chaffey's come-from-behind win over Jetze Plat was named in the International Paralympic Committee's Top 50 moments in Paralympic sport of 2013. Chaffey was nominated for IPC Athlete of the Month in September 2013.

In January 2013, Chaffey won the inaugural Australian Paratriathlon Championships, beating Ironman and Paralympian John Maclean and Paralympic rower Erik Horrie. He won the Men's TRI-1 classification of the 2014 Oceania Paratriathlon Championships in a world best time of 58.22, and won the 2014 ITU World Paratriathlon event in Elwood, Melbourne.

In March 2013, Chaffey set a new TRI-1 world best time for an Olympic distance triathlon. His time of 2:08:59 bettered the previous record by 5 minutes. In 2016 Chaffey again bettered that time by over 5 minutes setting a new world best time of 2:02:35.

In May 2013, Chaffey raced Ironman Cairns where he qualified for Ironman World Championships in Kona. He placed 2nd his classification in Kona.

Chaffey was forced to withdraw from the 2014 ITU World Triathlon Series Final in Edmonton, Alberta, Canada after breaking his hip in a training accident at home just prior to the event. In January 2015, he returned from injury to win the Oceania Paratriathlon Championships PT1 event at Penrith, New South Wales.

Chaffey won his fifth world championship at the 2015 World Championships Final in Chicago.

Chaffey competed at the 2016 Rio Paralympics Games and finished fourth in the Men's PT1 event. In preparation for the Paralympics, Chaffey stated "I just thought, this has to be mine. I have to have it...the Paralympics, A paralympic gold would not be a level step up but a greater step up, it's something I'm really putting a lot of focus on." During the Paralympics, Chaffey expressed his love of triathlon through saying "It's triathlon, it's in my blood. I love it. It's the greatest sport in the world".

At the 2018 Commonwealth Games, Gold Coast, Queensland, he won the bronze medal in the men's PWTC despite crashing in the hand cycle leg and riding the final 8 km of that leg with one pedal.

In his final major international event, at the 2018 World Championships, Gold Coast, Queensland, he finished sixth in the Men's PTWC.

== Recognition ==
- 2016 – Australian Paratriathlete of the Year
