= Nic Beveridge =

Australian paratriathlete

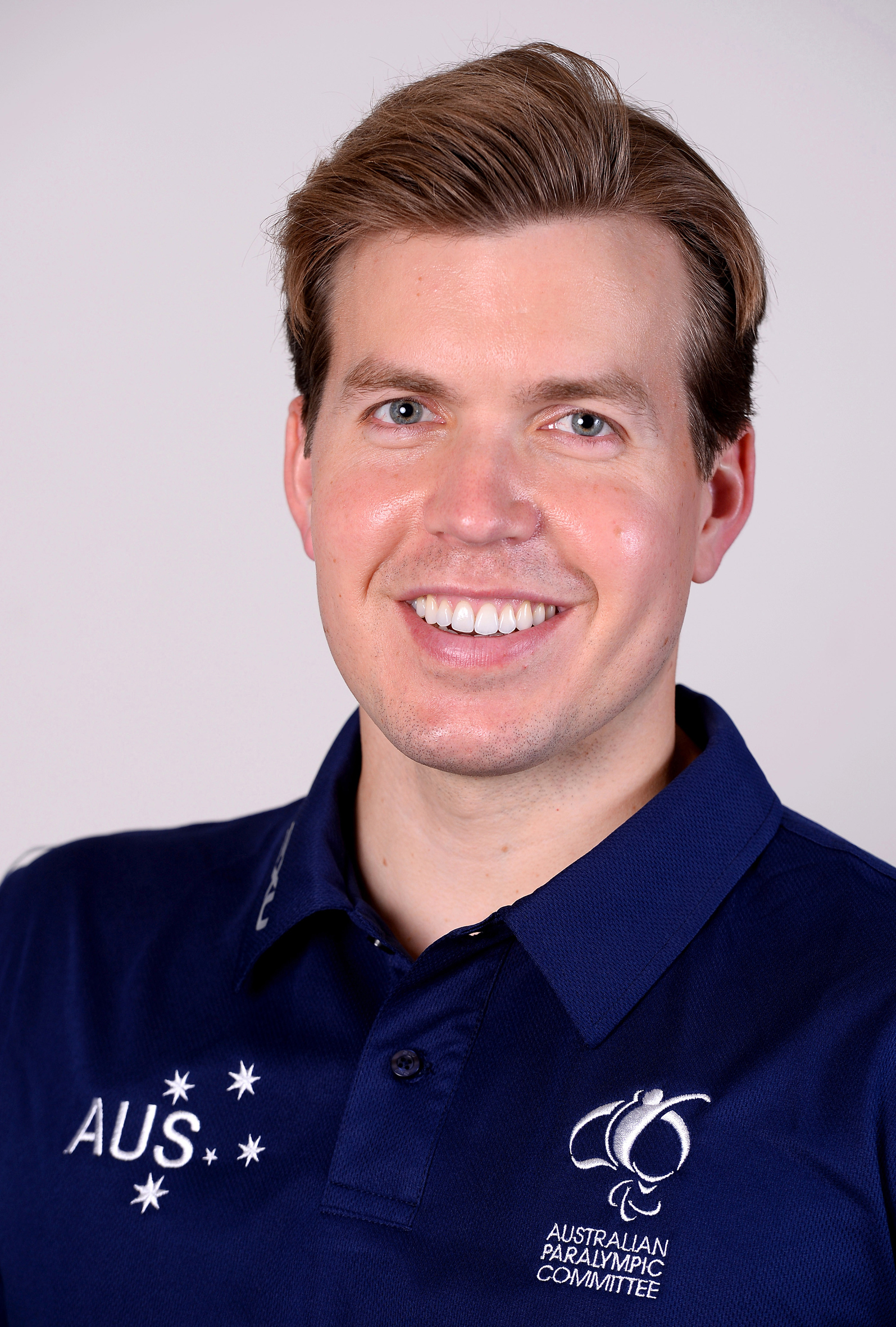
- Beveridge in 2016

Personal information
- Full name: Nicholas Beveridge
- Born: 14 July 1986 (age 40) Gold Coast, Queensland

Sport
- Country: Australia
- Sport: Men's para triathlon
- Disability class: PTWC (handcycle/racing wheelchair classification)
Medal record
Men's paratriathlon
Representing Australia
Oceania Championships
Gold medal – first place	2024 Stockton	PTWC
Gold medal – first place	2025 Mooloolaba	PTWC
Silver medal – second place	2014 Penrith	PT1
Silver medal – second place	2017 Devonport	PTWC
Bronze medal – third place	2016 Devonport	PT1
Commonwealth Games
Silver medal – second place	2018 Gold Coast	PTWC Triathlon

Nicholas Beveridge (born 14 July 1986) is an elite Australian triathlete with a disability. He represented Australia at the 2018 Gold Coast Commonwealth Games where he won a silver medal. He has competed at three Summer Paralympics.

== Personal ==
Beveridge was born on 14 July 1986 in Gold Coast, Queensland. He grew up in Mackay and was an avid sports fan taking part in cross county, swimming, water polo and hockey before waking up in 2003 at the age of 17 to discover he was completely paralysed from the chest down. He was later diagnosed with transverse myelitis, a neurological disorder causing inflammation to his spinal cord. He completed a Bachelor of Laws (Hons) in 2023 at the Queensland University of Technology.

== Career ==
In 2012, after a short stay in hospital, Beveridge fell in love with paralympic sport. This led to Beveridge choosing to take up paratriathlon. Beveridge competes in the PTWC (handcycle/racing wheelchair classification). He first started competing in 2013 making his international debut at the 2013 ITU World Championships in London finishing 17th in the Men's PT1. Competing at the 2014 ITU World Championship Grand Final in Edmonton he finished 9th in the Men's PT1. At the 2015 ITU World Championship Grand Final in Chicago he finished 9th in the Men's PT1. At the 2016 Rotterdam ITU Paratriathlon World Championships in Rotterdam, he finished 11th in the Men's PT1.

Beveridge is able to compete in triathlon by swimming using his upper body, riding with a recumbent handcycle and completing the run through the use of a racing wheelchair.

Beveridge competed at the 2016 Rio Paralympics Games and placed ninth in Men's PT1 event. Beveridge reflected on his performance in Rio throughout saying "It was the fittest I've ever been and I was happy with how it went."

At the 2017 ITU World Championships in Rotterdam, Beveridge finished fourth in the Men's PTWC. It was his best ever international performance. Beveridge won the silver medal in the Men's PTWC at the 2018 Commonwealth Games. At the 2019 ITU World Triathlon Grand Final in Lausanne, he finished ninth in the Men's PTWC.

At the 2020 Tokyo Paralympics, Beveridge he finished seventh in Men's PTWC with a Total Time of 1:04.50. Beveridge was ranked sixth going into the 2024 Paris Paralympics and finished sixth.

== Recognition ==
- 2019 - Triathlon Australia Male Para-triathlon Performance of the Year
- 2021 - Triathlon Australia Male Para-triathlon Performance of the Year
