= Anu Francis =

Australian paratriathlete

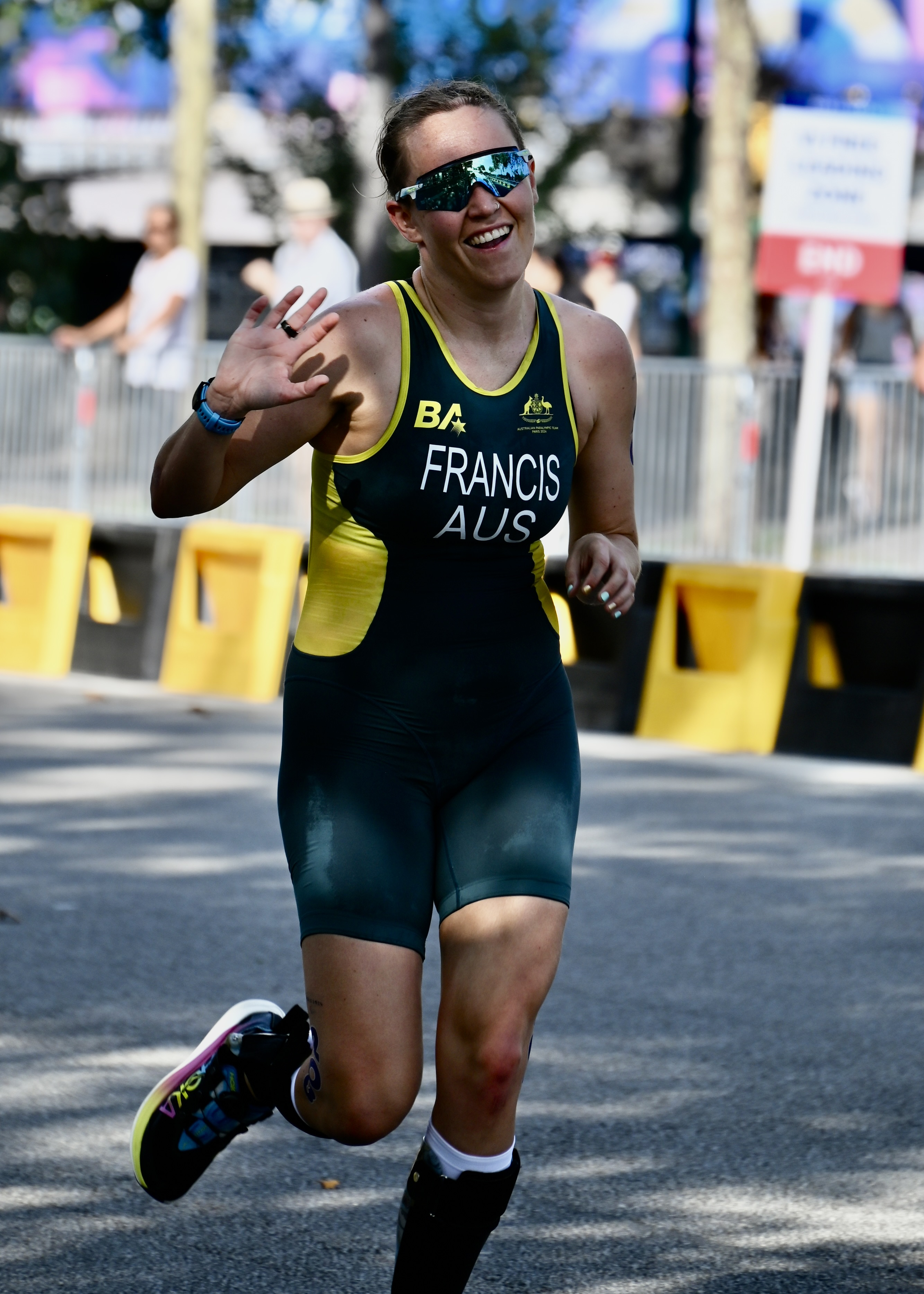
- Francis at the 2024 Summer Paralympics

Personal information
- Nationality: Australian
- Born: 15 September 1995 (age 31)

Sport
- Sport: Paratriathlon
Medal record
Women's paratriathlon
Representing Australia
World Championships
Gold medal – first place	2025 Wollongong	PTS2
Silver medal – second place	2023 Ponteverde	PTS2
Silver medal – second place	2026 Pontevedra	PTS2
Bronze medal – third place	2022 Abu Dhabi	PTS2

Anu Francis (born 15 September 1995) is an Australian para-triathlete. She competed at the 2024 Paris Paralympics.

== Personal life ==
Francis was born on 15 September 1995. In 2017, she was diagnosed with Ehlers Danlos Syndrome and Dopa-Responsive Dystonia. Her disability has a variety of impairments, including hypertonia, involuntary muscle movements and gait abnormalities. In 2017, she graduated with Bachelor of Science (Veterinary Bioscience) at University of Adelaide. Due to her disability, she was denied undertaking a Doctor of Veterinary Medicine. She completed a double bachelor's degree of Secondary and Special Education at Flinders University in 2022. In 2024, she is undertaking a Bachelor of Exercise Science at Flinders University.

Francis is a part of the LGBTQ+ community.

== Paratriathlon ==
Francis participated in para-badminton and para-rowing at a national level and just missed out on being selected for 2020 Tokyo Paralympics rowing team. Francis is classified as PTS2 triathlete. Her first triathlon was at the National Championships in 2021. Since 2022, she has regularly finished in the top two in major international Women's PTS2 events. Francis won the Paris Paralympics test event in 2023 and is ranked number two leading into the 2024 Paris Paralympics. At the 2024 Summer Paralympics, she finished fourth in the Women's PTS2.

At the 2025 World Triathlon Para Championships in Wollongong, she won the gold medal in the Women's PTS2.

Her coach is Chris Rawling, a former professional triathlete and lecturer at Flinders University.

== Recognition ==
- Pippa Downes Pinnacle Scholarship
- 2025 - South Australian Sports Institute Female Para Athlete of the Year
