= Tanja Neubert =

German triathlete (born 2000)

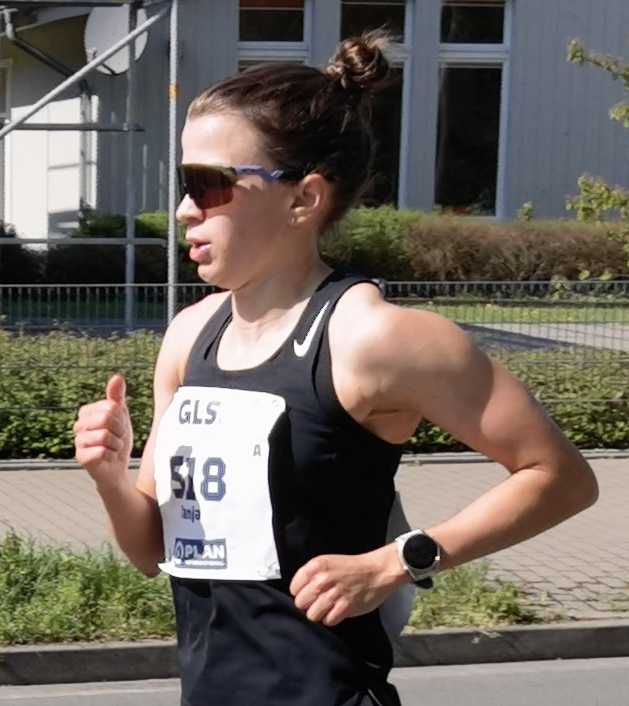

Personal information
- Born: 2000

Sport
- Country: Germany
Medal record
Women's triathlon
Representing Germany
Ironman 70.3 World Championship
Bronze medal – third place	2025 Marbella	Individual
World Championships
Bronze medal – third place	2025 Hamburg	Mixed relay

Tanja Neubert (born 2000) is a German triathlete. She placed third at the Ironman 70.3 World Championship in 2025. That year, she was also a bronze medalist representing Germany at the World Triathlon Mixed Relay Championships.

== Career ==
From Saarbrücken, Neubert competed in swimming as a youngster, specialising in the breaststroke, before transitioning to triathlon. In 2018, Neubert won a silver medal with the junior German team in the European Mixed Relay Championships.

In 2022, Neubert won two Continental Cup and finished 17th in her World Cup debut in Pontevedra, Spain, and 21st in Tongyeong-si, South Korea, before placing fifth at her third World Cup appearance, in Miyazaki, Japan, missing the podium by only four seconds.

In June 2023, Neubert won the Europe Triathlon Cup in Kitzbühel, Austria, finishing in 56:48, just ahead of her compatriot Selina Klamt, who finished four seconds behind. In December 2023, she won the women's 10,000 metres race at the 49th Saarbrücken New Year's Eve Run.

In June 2024, she won the Europe Triathlon Cup Kitzbühel again. In August 2024, she won the Europe Triathlon Cup Istanbul in Turkey. The following month, she placed fourth at the 2024 World Triathlon Cup Valencia.

In February 2025, she won at the 2025 World Triathlon Championship Series in Abu Dhabi, alongside Selina Klamt, Jan Diener and Henry Graf in the mixed team relay, finishing ahead of the United States and Italy. In September 2025, she placed third at the WTCS Weihai behind Beth Potter and her German compatriot Lisa Tertsch. Alongside Tertsch, Lasse Nygaard and Graf she was a bronze medalist at the 2025 World Triathlon Mixed Relay Championships.

In November 2025, she placed third at the Ironman 70.3 World Championship in Marbella behind Lucy Charles-Barclay of Great Britain and Taylor Knibb of the United States, in only her second 70.3 race.
