= Jack Howell (triathlete) =

Australian paratriathlete

Personal information
- Nationality: Australian
- Born: 28 February 2004 (age 22) Canberra, Australian Capital Territory

Sport
- Sport: Paratriathlon
Medal record
Men's paratriathlon
Representing Australia
World Championships
Silver medal – second place	2024 Torremolinos	PTS5
Silver medal – second place	2025 Wollongong	PTS5
Silver medal – second place	2025 Wollongong	Mixed relay
Oceania Championships
Gold medal – first place	2024 Stockton	PTS5
Silver medal – second place	2025 Mooloolaba	PTS5

Jack Howell (born 28 February 2004) is an Australian para-triathlete. He competed at the 2024 Paris Paralympics.

== Personal ==
Howell was born on 28 February 2004 at 33 weeks premature in Canberra. His premature birth resulted in condition known as Symbrachydactyly which resulted in a congenital amputation of the left hand and affected the left arm's length and motion. He attended Kambrya College.

== Paratriathlon ==
Howell was a competitive swimmer, cross-country runner and triathlete during youth. At the age of thirteen, he started in triathlon and in 2022 was classified in the PTS5 category allowing him to compete internationally. Since 2022, he has won Australian and Oceania Championships and has several top five placings in World Triathlon Para Series events.

In 2024, he moved from Victoria to the Gold Coast to be coached by Olympian Brendan Sexton. He was ranked fifth in the Men's PTS5 going into the 2024 Paris Paralympics where he finished seventh.

At the 2025 World Triathlon Para Championships, he won silver medals in the Men's PTS5 and Mixed relay.

== Recognition ==
- 2022 – Lindsay Gaze Outstanding Sports Leadership Award, Victorian School Sports Awards
- 2023 – Marg Angel Junior Sportsperson of the Year at Victorian Disability Sport & Recreation Awards
- 2024 – Tier 3 Scholarship within the Sport Australia Hall of Fame Scholarship and Mentoring Program.
- 2024 - Triathlon Australia Male Para Performance of the Year
- 2025 - Victorian Sports Award Young Athlete of the Year
