= Justin Godfrey =

Australian paratriathlete

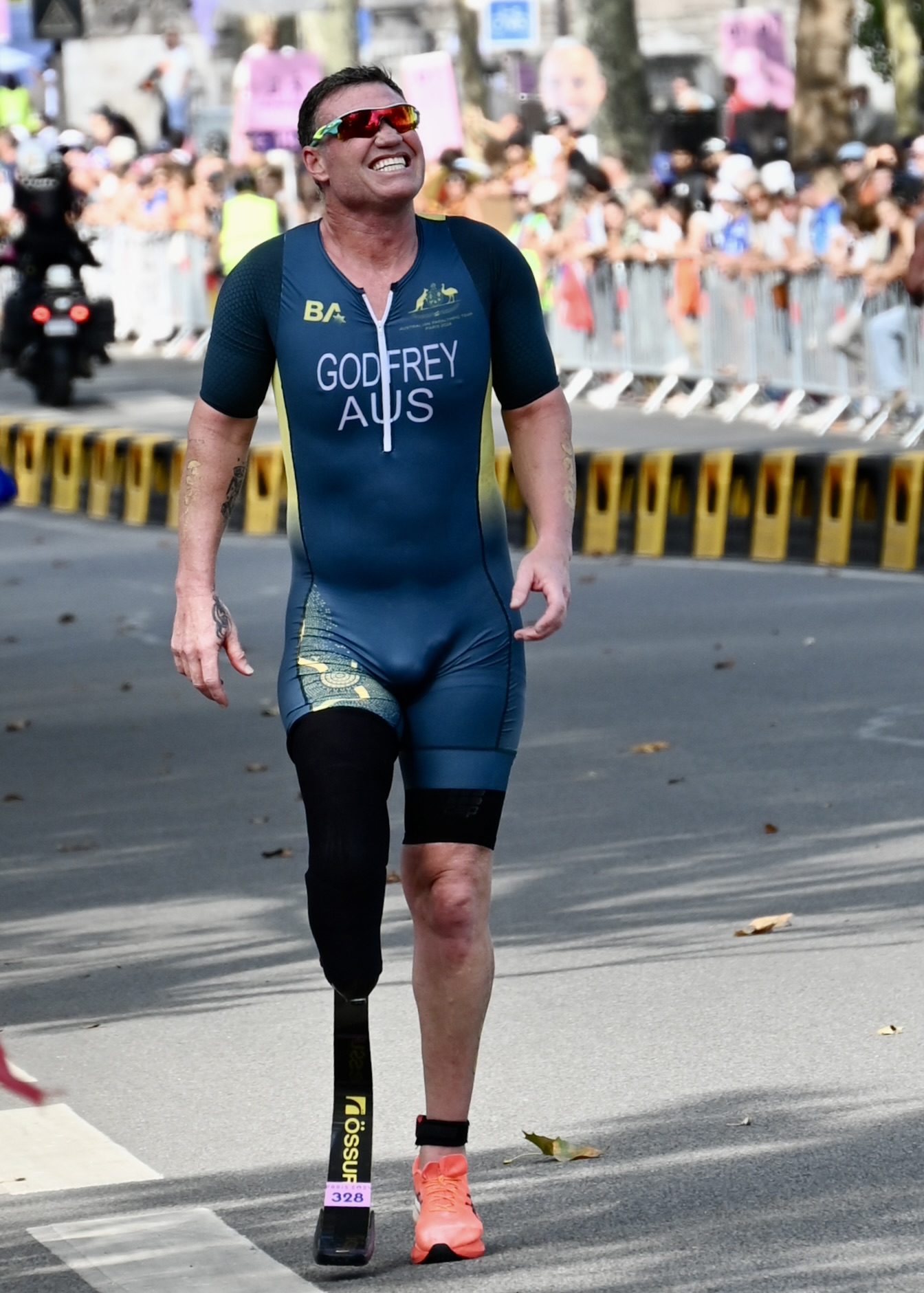
- Godfrey at the 2024 Summer Paralympics

Personal information
- Nationality: Australian

Sport
- Sport: Paratriathlon
Medal record
Representing Australia
Men's paratriathlon
World Championships
Silver medal – second place	2017 Rotterdam	PTS3
Bronze medal – third place	2015 Chicago	PT3
Oceania Championships
Gold medal – first place	2014 Penrith	PT4
Gold medal – first place	2017 Devonport	PTS3
Men's para-aquathlon
World Championships
Bronze medal – third place	2013 London	TRI 5

Justin Godfrey is an Australian para-triathlete. He competed at the 2024 Paris Paralympics.

== Personal ==
In his teenage years, a motorcycle accident resulted in his lower leg being severely damaged, and after many years of trying to save the leg it was amputated.

== Paratriathlon ==
Prior to concentrating on paratriathlon, he played wheelchair basketball at a national level and mountain biking. In 2012, he was introduced to paratriathlon and this required him to learn to swim and run. He was classified as a PTS3 paratriathlete. He went to win to three World Para Triathlon gold medals in his classification. Unfortunately, his PTS3 classification was not in the 2016 and 2020 Summer Paralympics program.

Godfrey was ranked sixth in the Men's PTS3 going into the 2024 Paris Paralympics and finished eleventh.

in 2024, he is a Victorian Institute of Sport scholarship athlete. He is a member of Beechworth Racing and coached by Adam Bechworth.
