= Triathlon at the 2018 Commonwealth Games – Men's PTWC =

Men's PTWC triathlon at the 2018 Commonwealth Games
- Venue: Southport Broadwater Parklands
- Date: 7 April 2018
- Competitors: 6 from 3 nations

Medalists
gold medal	Joe Townsend	England
silver medal	Nic Beveridge	Australia
bronze medal	Bill Chaffey	Australia

The men's PTWC triathlon was part of the Triathlon at the 2018 Commonwealth Games program. The competition was held on 7 April 2018 in the Southport Broadwater Parklands.

== Schedule ==
All times are Australian Eastern Standard Time (UTC+10)

Date	Time	Round
Saturday 7 April 2018	09:31	Race

== Competition format ==
The race was held over the "sprint distance" and consisted of swimming, road bicycling, and road running. As the event included multiple para-sport classifications, a 'compensation' time system was used, with athletes in more restricted classifications beginning the event a factored time period ahead of other athletes to create fair competition.

== Results ==
Rank	Triathlete	Nationality	Class	Comp	Swimming	T1	Cycling	T2	Running	Total time	Diff
1st place, gold medalist(s)	Joe Townsend	England	PTWC2	3:00	12:32	1:08	31:55	0:36	13:28	1:02:39	-
2nd place, silver medalist(s)	Nic Beveridge	Australia	PTWC1	0:00	11:10	1:44	35:40	1:05	13:49	1:03:28	+0:49
3rd place, bronze medalist(s)	Bill Chaffey	Australia	PTWC2	3:00	10:55	1:36	35:20	0:45	12:37	1:04:13	+1:34
4	Mark Conway	England	PTWC1	0:00	12:00	1:37	38:23	0:47	13:30	1:06:17	+3:38
5	Scott Crowley	Australia	PTWC2	3:00	11:49	1:37	36:24	0:56	14:48	1:08:34	+5:55
6	David Kerr	Northern Ireland	PTWC1	0:00	12:44	1:59	39:56	1:15	16:36	1:12:30	+9:51
