= Jeremy Peacock =

Australian paratriathlete

Personal information
- Nationality: Australian
- Born: 23 June 1991 (age 35)

Sport
- Sport: Paratriathlon
Medal record
Men's paratriathlon
Representing Australia
World Championships
Silver medal – second place	2025 Wollongong	Mixed relay
Bronze medal – third place	2022 Abu Dhabi	PTS4
Oceania Championships
Gold medal – first place	2022 Stockton	PTS4
Gold medal – first place	2023 Stockton	PTS4
Gold medal – first place	2024 Stockton	PTS4
Silver medal – second place	2025 Mooloolaba	PTS4

Jeremy Peacock (born 23 June 1991) is an Australian para-triathlete. He competed at the 2024 Paris Paralympics.

== Personal life ==
Peacock was born on 23 June 1991 three months premature that resulted in him being diagnosed with hemiplegia cerebral palsy. He has completed a Bachelor of Commerce in Accounting and Finance from Bond University. In 2024, he works as an associate director at KPMG.

== Paratriathlon ==
During his high school years, he participated in able-bodied running and then cycling in his early 20's. He took up triathlon in 2017 and in 2019 transitioned to paratriathlon. He is classified as a PTS4 paratriathlrete. His Australian debut in 2020 and international debut in 2022. He won the bronze medal in the Men's PTS4 at 2022 World Triathlon Championship Series in Abu Dhabi.

He was ranked seventh in the Men's PTS4 going into the 2024 Paris Paralympics and finished eight. At the 2025 World Triathlon Para Championships in Wollongong, he won the silver medal in the Mixed Relay and finished seventh in the Men's PTS4.

He is a Victorian Institute of Sport scholarship athlete.
