= Gina Sereno =

American triathlete (born 1995)

Personal information
- Nationality: American
- Born: 16 June 1995 (age 31) Madison, Wisconsin
- Education: University of Michigan

Sport
- Country: United States
- Sport: Triathlon

Gina Sereno (born 16 June 1995) is an American triathlete and NASA engineer.

== Early life ==
Sereno grew up in Madison, Wisconsin where she would train with her twin brother Jeff. She later attended the University of Michigan where she earned honors as a 7x All-American and Big 10 Champion in the 3K, 5K, and 10K, graduating in 2018. She accepted a job from NASA and was recruited by Barb Lindquist into the USA Triathlon Collegiate Recruitment Program.

== Career ==
Sereno started triathlon in July 2018. She won the Americas Triathlon Championship in St. George, Utah in October 2021. She won the Americas Cup Triathlon in Long Beach in 2022. She made her Arena Games Triathlon debut in Munich in 2022. At the end of the 2022 season, she claimed her first World Triathlon Cup podium with a second-place finish at Vina del Mar.

Sereno won the Arena Games Triathlon held on Feb 25, 2023 at the Parc Olympique in Montreal, Canada. She finished sixth at the Arena Games World Championships in London, which was enough for her to win silver in the overall World Standings. She finished 12th at the 2023 Pan American Games in Santiago.

== Personal life ==
Sereno works at the jet propulsion laboratory at NASA, and lives in Boulder, Colorado with fellow triathlete Chase McQueen. She worked for four years for NASA as an engineer on the Psyche spacecraft which launched in 2023.
