= Adrien Briffod =

Swiss triathlete

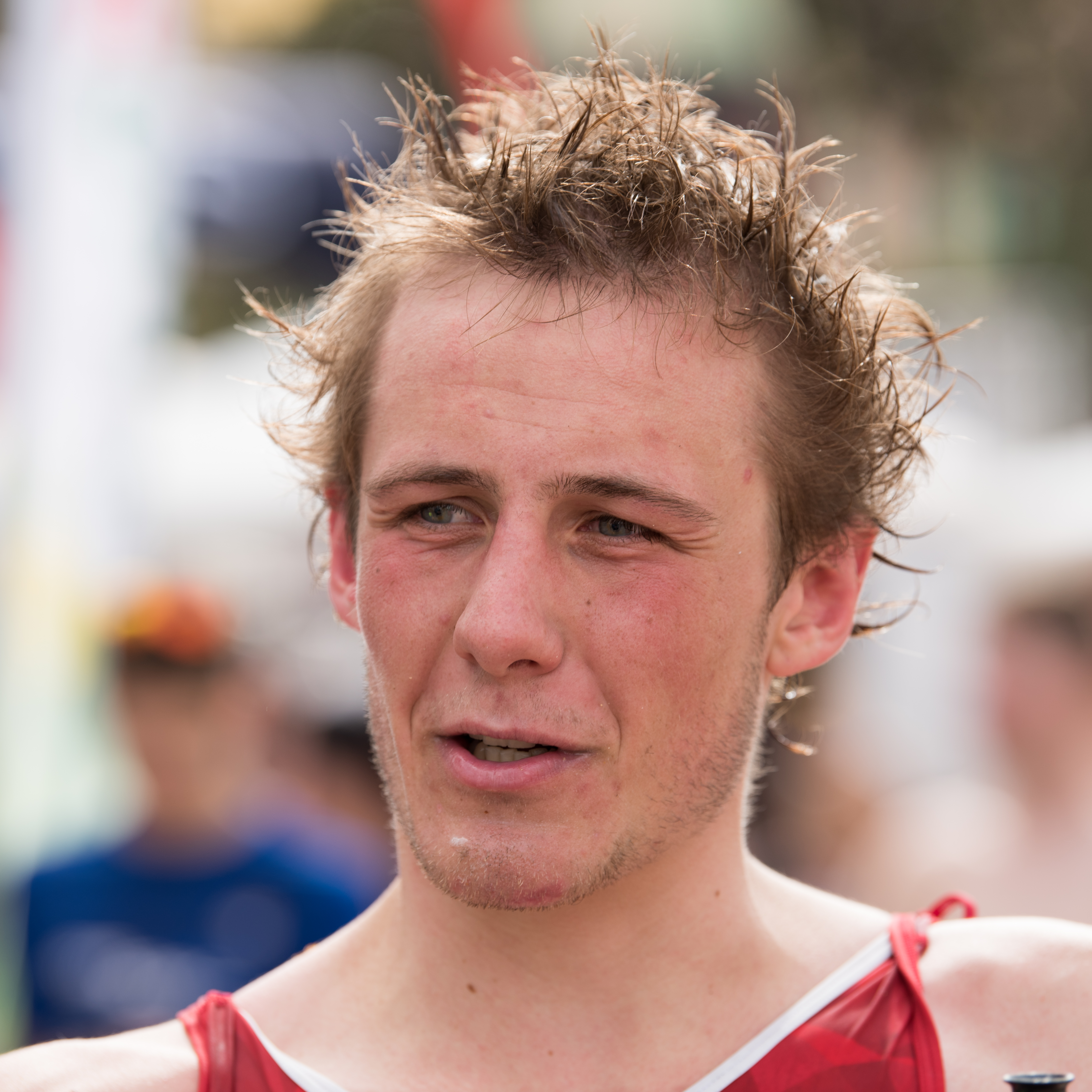
- Briffod in 2018

Personal information
- Born: 2 August 1994 (age 31) Vevey, Switzerland

Sport
- Country: Switzerland
- Sport: Triathlon
Medal record
Men's triathlon
Representing Switzerland
European Games
Bronze medal – third place	2023 Kraków-Małopolska	Individual
Europe Triathlon Championships
Bronze medal – third place	2023 Madrid	Individual

Adrien Briffod (born 2 August 1994) is a Swiss triathlete.

In 2023, he won bronze medals at the European Championships and the European Games. He also finished 49th in the men's triathlon at the 2024 Summer Olympics.

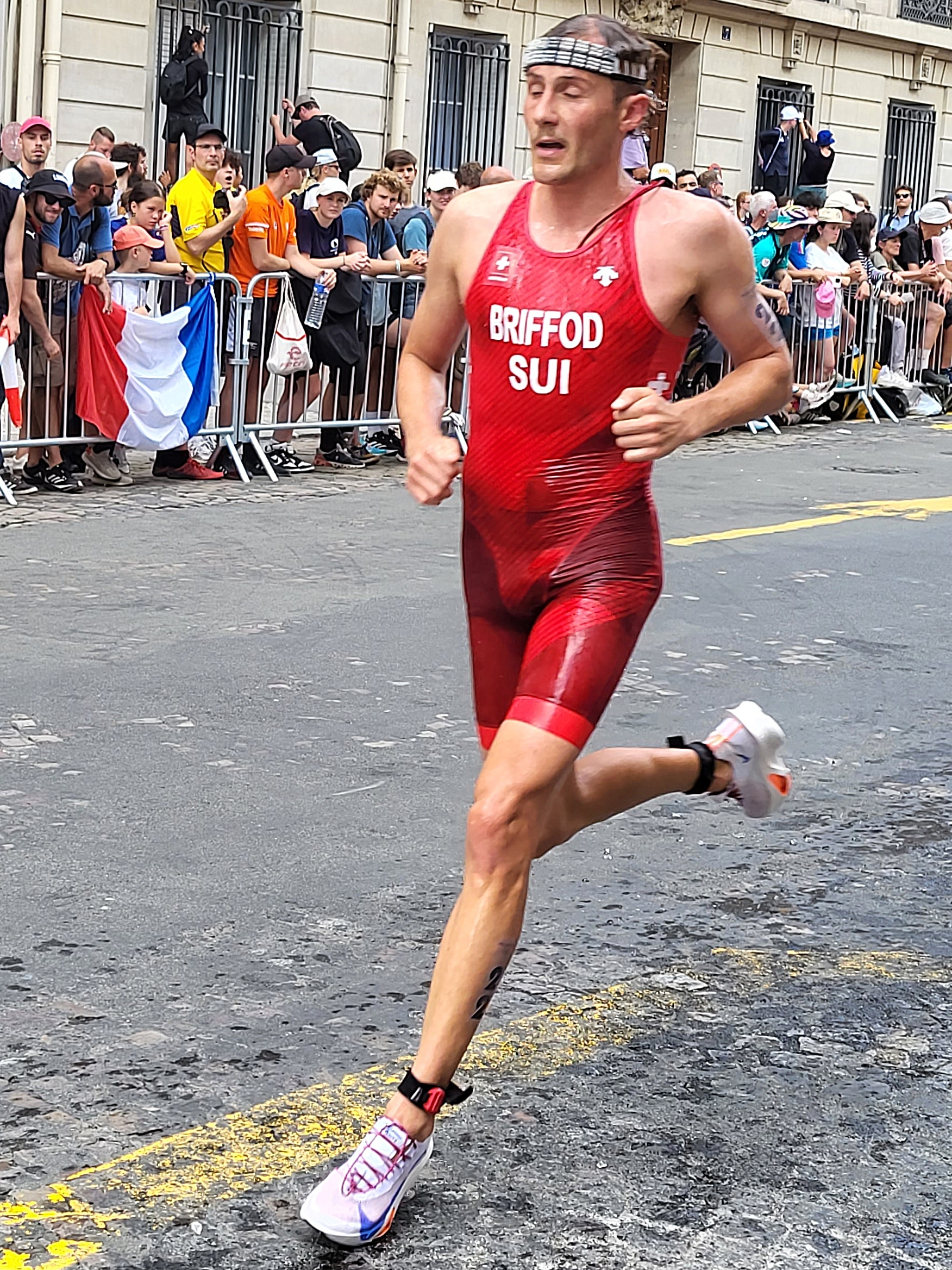
Briffod at the 2024 Summer Olympics
