= Csongor Lehmann =

Hungarian triathlete (born 1999)

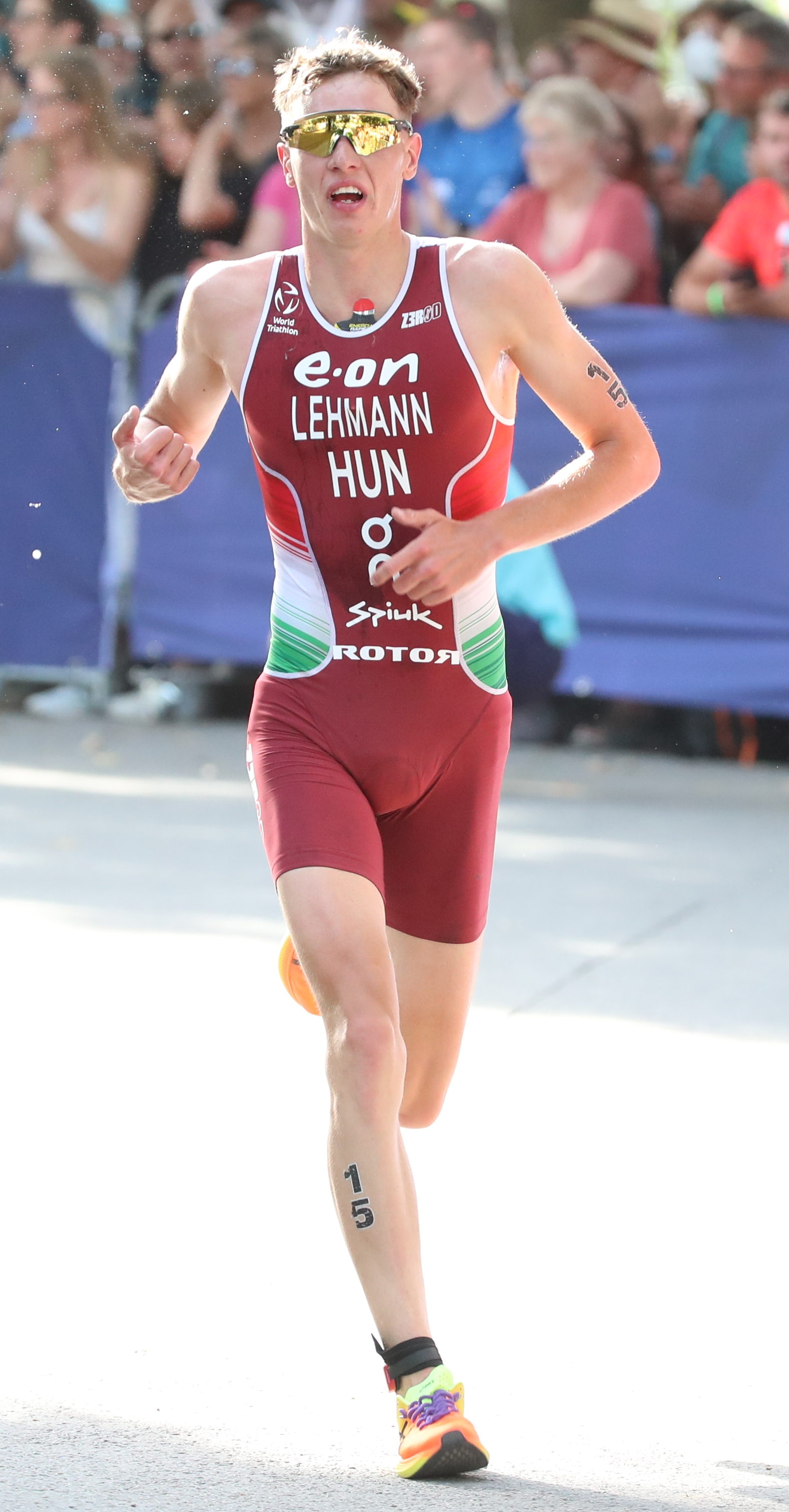
- Lehmann in 2022

Personal information
- Born: 2 April 1999 (age 27) Budapest, Hungary

Sport
- Country: Hungary
- Sport: Triathlon
Medal record
Men's triathlon
Representing Hungary
European Championships
Gold medal – first place	2024 Vichy	Men's

Csongor Lehmann (born 2 April 1999) is a Hungarian triathlete.

In 2021, he won the Under-23 World Triathlon Championships. He also won the World Junior Championship three years prior. In 2024, he took his first World Triathlon Championship Series podium, finishing third in Cagliari. He also finished 11th in the men's triathlon at the 2024 Summer Olympics.
