= Mitch Kolkman =

Dutch triathlete

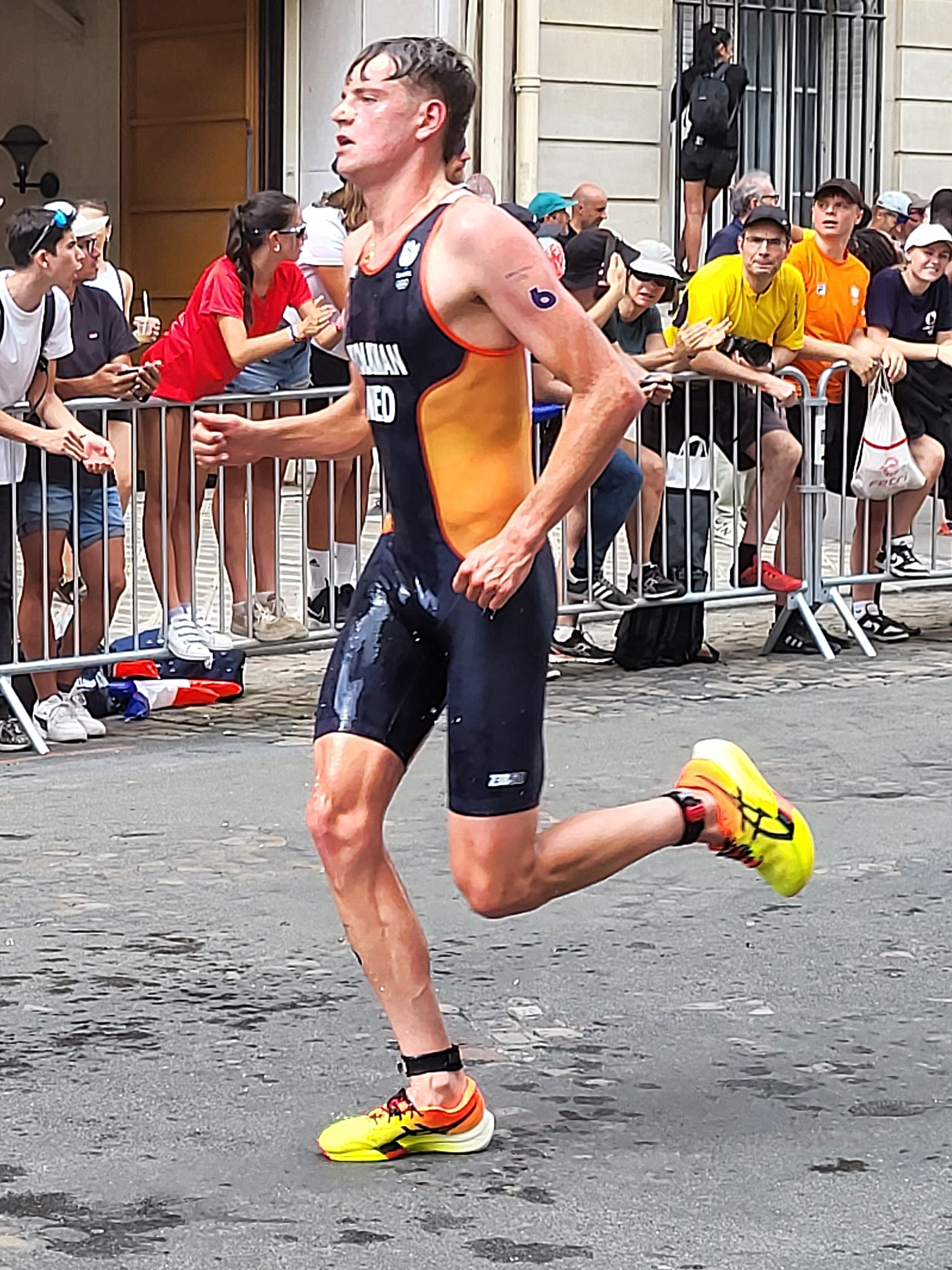
- Kolkman at the 2024 Summer Olympics

Personal information
- Nationality: Dutch
- Born: 19 September 2002 (age 24) Haarlem

Sport
- Sport: Triathlon

Mitch Kolkman (born 19 September 2002) is a Dutch triathlete. He competed at the 2024 Paris Olympics.

== Early life ==
He is from Haarlem. He found his route into triathlon via swimming at ZV Haerlem. He later moved from Haarlem to Limburg where the National Triathlon Training Centre (NTC) is located.

== Career ==
He became Dutch junior triathlon champion in 2021. That year, he won the junior Europe Triathlon Cup race in Bled, Slovenia.

He was a bronze medalist at the 2023 World U23 Championships in Abu Dhabi at the Olympic distance.

He became Dutch triathlon champion at the sprint distance in Rotterdam in June 2024. That month, he won his first Europe Triathlon Cup race, in Holten.

He competed in the men's individual event and the mixed relay at the 2024 Summer Olympics in Paris.
