= Nil Riudavets =

Spanish paratriathlete (born 1996)

Personal information
- Full name: Nil Riudavets Victory
- Born: 3 April 1996 (age 30) Mahón, Balearic Islands, Spain

Sport
- Country: Spain
- Sport: Paratriathlon
- Disability class: PTS4
Medal record
Men's paratriathlon
Representing Spain
Paralympic Games
| Bronze medal – third place | 2024 Paris | PTS4 |
World Championships
| Silver medal – second place | 2024 Torremolinos | PTS4 |
| Silver medal – second place | 2026 Pontevedra | PTS4 |
| Bronze medal – third place | 2024 Torremolinos | Mixed relay |
| Bronze medal – third place | 2025 Wollongong | PTS4 |
European Championships
| Silver medal – second place | 2023 Madrid | PTS4 |
| Silver medal – second place | 2024 Vichy | PTS4 |
| Bronze medal – third place | 2025 Besançon | PTS4 |

Nil Riudavets Victory (born 3 April 1996) is a Spanish paratriathlete. He represented Spain at the 2024 Summer Paralympics.

== Career ==
Riudavets represented Spain at the 2024 Summer Paralympics and won a bronze medal in the PTS4 event.
