= Grace Brimelow =

Australian paratriathlete

Personal information
- Nationality: Australian
- Born: 17 April 2007 (age 19) Nambour, Queensland

Sport
- Sport: Paratriathlon
Medal record
Women's paratriathlon
Representing Australia
World Championships
| Silver medal – second place | 2025 Wollongong | PTS5 |
Oceania Championships
| Gold medal – first place | 2024 Stockton | PTS4 |
| Gold medal – first place | 2025 Mooloolaba | PTS5 |

Grace Brimelow (born 17 April 2007) is an Australian para-triathlete. She competed at the 2024 Paris Paralympics.

== Personal life ==
Brimelow was born on 17 April 2007 in Nambour, Queensland. She was born with Cri du chat syndrome, which is a rare genetic disorder caused by missing pieces on a particular chromosome and reduces physical capacity and strength. In 2024, she attends Sunshine Coast Grammar School.

== Paratriathlon ==
She became involved in triathlon after Maureen Cummings, her physical education teacher at Sunshine Coast Grammar School and a former national triathlete, identified her talent in running and swimming. She is classified as PTS4 paratriathlete. In 2022, she was selected to participate in a national para-development camp for triathlon in Melbourne. Her first international competition was in 2023 at the Oceania Para Triathlon Cup. In 2024, she won the World Triathlon Para Cup Vigo, Spain in the Women's PTS4. Entering the 2024 Paris Paralympics, she was ranked sixth in the Women's PTS4 and was disqualified for an error on the bike leg.

At the 2025 World Triathlon Para Championships in Wollongong, she won the silver medal in the Women's PTS4.

Her coach is Toby Coote, Sunshine Coast Triathlon Academy.

== Recognition ==
- 2024 - Triathlon Australia Chris Hewitt Emerging Athlete Award
