= Para triathlon classification =

Disability sport classification system

Para triathlon classification is the classification system for athletes participating in Para triathlon. It is governed by the World Triathlon (formerly known as ITU). The sport has been included in the 2016 Summer Paralympics.

== Classification system from 2017 ==
World Triathlon has implemented some modifications to the classification system that was introduced in 2014 after further research was conducted to address certain aspects of the previous system. The research project is an ongoing project for both physical and vision impairments.

Paratriathlon groups athletes into nine sport classes, based on three types of impairment, that compete in six medal events.

=== Wheelchair users (PTWC) ===
The two classes are PTWC1 (more severe} and PTWC2, for upper limb and lower limb disabilities, respectively. Athletes must use a recumbent handcycle on the cycling segment and a racing chair for the running segment.

The two classes compete together in the same medal event, with PTWC1 competitors receiving a time advantage (3:08 for men, 4:04 for women).

=== Standing (ambulatory) athletes (PTS) ===
There are four classes—PTS2, PTS3, PTS4, and PTS5—with lower numbers indicating more severe limitations. Athletes may use approved prosthesis or other supportive devices for the cycling segment. These classes are open to athletes with impairments such as, but not limited to, muscle power disorders, limb deficiencies, hypertonia, ataxia, or athetosis. Each class competes in its own event.

=== Vision impairment (PTVI) ===
The three classes are PTVI1 (totally blind or little or no light perception in either eye), PTVI2 (more severe partial blindness), and PTV3 (less severe partial blindness). Competitors must use a guide of the same gender and nationality throughout the race, and must use a tandem bike, with the guide leading, in the cycling segment. All three classes compete in the same event, with PTVI1 athletes receiving a headstart (3:21 for men, 3:48 for women).

== Classification system from 2014 ==
The World Triathlon revised the Para triathlon classification system in preparation for the sport's debut at the 2016 Summer Paralympics. The World Triathlon formed a Paratriathlon Classification Research Group to develop an evidence-based and sports specific classification system, drawing on work in swimming, cycling and athletics.

The result of the research was a classification system which was implemented during the 2014 season. There were five classes, PT1 to PT4 was for athletes with various mobility impairments with PT1 for the most impaired and PT4 for the least impaired. PT5 was for visually impaired athletes.

- PT1 – Athletes with mobility impairments such as muscle power, limb deficiency, hypertonia, ataxia or athetosis that render them incapable of safely running or pedalling a bicycle. They must have a classification assessment score of up to 640,0 points. Athletes must use a recumbent handcycle during the cycling stage and a racing wheelchair for the running phase of the race.
- PT2 – Athletes with mobility impairments such as muscle power, limb deficiency, hypertonia, ataxia or athetosis that have a classification assessment score of up to 454,9 points. Amputees may use approved prostheses or supportive devices during the running and cycling stages.
- PT3 – Athletes with mobility impairments such as muscle power, limb deficiency, hypertonia, ataxia or athetosis that have a classification assessment score from 455,0 to 494,9 points. Athletes may use approved prostheses or supportive devices during the running and cycling stages.
- PT4 – Athletes with mobility impairments such as muscle power, limb deficiency, hypertonia, ataxia or athetosis that have a classification assessment score from 495,0 to 557,0 points. Athletes may use approved prostheses or supportive devices during the running and cycling stages.
- PT5 – Athletes with a visual impairment. All qualifying levels of visual impairment, IBSA/IPC defined sub-classes B1, B2, and B3, are grouped together in this classification. Athletes must have a sighted guide of the same gender and nationality during the entire race and use a tandem bicycle during the cycling stage.

== Pre-2014 classification system ==
Until the 2014 season, the ITU classified Para triathletes into seven categories:

- TRI 1 – Wheelchair user: Includes Paraplegic, Quadriplegic, Polio, Double Leg Amputee and disabilities that prevent the safe use of a conventional bicycle. Must use hand cycle on bike course and racing wheelchair on the run.
- TRI 2 – Severe leg impairment, including above knee amputees. Must ride bicycle and run with above knee prosthesis or run using crutches.
- TRI 3 – Les Autres: Includes athletes with multiple sclerosis, muscular dystrophy, cerebral palsy, double leg amputee or paralysis in multiple limbs. Must ride a bicycle or tricycle and run. May use braces or prosthesis.
- TRI 4 – Arm impairment: Includes paralysis, above elbow amputees and below elbow amputees, or impairment in both upper limbs. Must ride a bike. May use prosthesis, brace or sling on the bike and/or run.
- TRI 5 – Moderate leg impairment: Includes below-knee amputees. Must ride a bicycle and may run with prosthesis.
- TRI 6a – Visual impairment, total blindness or may be able to perceive light but not recognise the shape of a hand at any distance or direction. Competes with a guide of the same gender and uses a tandem bicycle.
- TRI 6b – Visual Impairment: Includes visual acuity of less than 6/60 vision or visual field less than 40 degrees with best corrective vision. One guide of the same gender is mandatory throughout the race.

This classification system was used at National, Continental and World Paratriathlon Championships until the end of the 2013 season.

== Levels of Classification ==
As in many other sports, there are three levels of Para triathlon classification available: Provisional, National and International. The first is for athletes who do not have access to a full classification panel; it is a temporary indication of class, generally used only in lower levels of competition. The second can be used in all domestic competitions. To compete internationally, an International-level classification is required. Many disabled triathletes compete entirely in age-group races, without going through the classification process.

== Ironman triathlon classification ==
The Ironman World Championship includes several divisions for Para triathletes:

- Handcycle – Physically challenged athletes who are paraplegic, quadriplegic or double above-the-knee amputees, and race using a hand cranked cycle on the bike segment and a racing chair for the run. These athletes would be classified TRI-1 in ITU races.
- Lower Extremity – This includes single below-the-knee amputees, in which a standard bicycle is used, and run with prosthesis or crutches. These athletes would be classified TRI-5 in ITU races.
- Wheelchair One – This division consists of single above-the-knee amputees who ride a standard bicycle, but use a racing chair on the run. There is no ITU equivalent of this division.
- Wheelchair Two – This division consists of athletes who have double below-the-knee or a double above-the-knee amputation. These athletes ride a standard bicycle and use a racing chair on the run. There is no ITU equivalent of this division.
- Upper Extremity – This is an athlete who has one arm amputated above or below the elbow, in which they will use prosthesis on the bike. These athletes would be classified TRI-4 in ITU races.
- Visually Impaired – This is for athletes who are legally blind, 20/200 with best-corrected vision, requiring a guide throughout the race. If a guide is needed, they may use a tandem bike and may be tethered during the swim and the run. These athletes would be classified TRI-6 in ITU races.

These Ironman Triathlon divisions were developed by the World Triathlon Corporation; they are separate from the classification system used by the ITU and International Paralympic Committee.

== At the Paralympic Games ==
For the 2016 Summer Paralympics in Rio, the International Paralympic Committee had a zero classification at the Games policy. This policy was put into place in 2014, with the goal of avoiding last minute changes in classes that would negatively impact athlete training preparations. All competitors needed to be internationally classified with their classification status confirmed prior to the Games, with exceptions to this policy being dealt with on a case-by-case basis. In case there was a need for classification or reclassification at the Games despite best efforts otherwise, Para triathlon classification was scheduled to take place at Fort Copacabana from September 4–6 for vision impaired competitors, and September 5–6 for all others. For sportspeople with physical or intellectual disabilities going through classification or reclassification in Rio, their in-competition observation event is their first appearance in competition at the Games.
