= Triathlon at the 2020 Summer Paralympics =

Triathlon at the XVI Paralympic Games
- Para triathlon pictogram of the 2020 Summer Paralympics
- Venue: Odaiba Marine Park
- Dates: 28 to 29 August 2021
- Competitors: 80 in 8 events

Triathlon at the 2020 Summer Paralympics in Tokyo, Japan, took place at the Odaiba Marine Park. It was the second time that para triathlon was scheduled in the Paralympics. Eight events were contested (four events for men and women each); two more events than previously contested at the 2016 Summer Paralympics.

The race course consisted of a 750m swim, 20 km bike ride and 5 km run, the swimming part of the race took place at the Odaiba Bay while the cycling and running courses traveled through the West Promenade district of Odaiba, featuring waterfalls and public gardens.

The 2020 Summer Olympic and Paralympic Games were postponed to 2021 due to the COVID-19 pandemic. They kept the 2020 name and were held from 24 August to 5 September 2021.

== Qualification ==
There were 80 qualified slots in the triathlon (36 male, 36 female and 8 gender free). The Paralympic qualification period started on 28 June 2019 and was suspended for a period on 16 March 2020 due to the COVID-19 pandemic which caused the 2020 Summer Paralympics to be postponed to August 2021, the qualification ranking period ended on 15 July 2021.

- A qualification slot is allocated to the NPC not to the individual athlete, however in Bipartite Commission Invitation the slot is allocated to the individual athlete not to the NPC.
- An NPC can allocate a maximum of two slots per medal event and/or a maximum of sixteen athletes in total.
- The ITU Paralympic Qualification Ranking List, the top nine ranked male or female athletes each obtain one qualification slot in each medal event.

	PTWC	PTS2	PTS4	PTS5	PTVI	Total
Men	Australia; Austria; France; France; Italy; Italy; Japan; Tunisia	—N/a	Brazil; China; Croatia; France; Great Britain; Japan; RPC; Spain; United States; United States	Australia; Austria; Brazil; Brazil; Canada; France; Germany; Great Britain; Spain; United States	Australia; France; France; Great Britain; Japan; Spain; Spain; Ukraine; United States	80
Women	Australia; Australia; Brazil; France; Italy; Japan; Mexico; Netherlands; Spain; United States	Finland; Great Britain; Italy; Japan; RPC; Spain; United States; United States; United States	—N/a	Canada; France; Great Britain; Great Britain; Hungary; Japan; RPC; Ukraine; United States; United States	Australia; Canada; France; Great Britain; Great Britain; Italy; Japan; Ukraine; United States; United States	80

== Schedule ==
All events start at 6:30 am and finish at 11:10 am (in Japanese Standard Time UTC+9)

OC	Opening ceremony	●	Event finals	CC	Closing ceremony

Tues 24 Aug	Wed 25 Aug	Thurs 26 Aug	Fri 27 Aug	Sat 28 Aug	Sun 29 Aug	Mon 30 Aug	Tues 31 Aug	Wed 1 Sept	Thurs 2 Sept	Fri 3 Sept	Sat 4 Sept	Sun 5 Sept	Gold medals
OC				• • • •	• • • •							CC	8

== Medal summary ==
=== Medal table ===
* Host nation (Japan)

Rank	NPC	Gold	Silver	Bronze	Total
1	United States	3	2	0	5
2	Spain	1	1	2	4
3	Great Britain	1	1	1	3
4	France	1	0	1	2
5	Germany	1	0	0	1
5	Netherlands	1	0	0	1
7	Italy	0	1	2	3
8	Japan*	0	1	1	2
9	Australia	0	1	0	1
9	Austria	0	1	0	1
11	Canada	0	0	1	1
Totals (11 entries)		8	8	8	24

=== Medalists ===
Event	Class	Gold	Silver	Bronze
Men	PTWC	Jetze Plat; Netherlands	Florian Brungraber; Austria	Giovanni Achenza; Italy
Men	PTS4	Alexis Hanquinquant; France	Hideki Uda; Japan	Alejandro Sánchez Palomero; Spain
Men	PTS5	Martin Schulz; Germany	George Peasgood; Great Britain	Stefan Daniel; Canada
Men	PTVI	United States; Brad Snyder; Guide: Greg Billington	Spain; Héctor Catalá Laparra; Guide: Gustavo Rodríguez Iglesias	Japan; Satoru Yoneoka; Guide: Kohei Tsubaki
Women	PTWC	Kendall Gretsch; United States	Lauren Parker; Australia	Eva Moral; Spain
Women	PTS2	Allysa Seely; United States	Hailey Danz; United States	Veronica Yoko Plebani; Italy
Women	PTS5	Lauren Steadman; Great Britain	Grace Norman; United States	Claire Cashmore; Great Britain
Women	PTVI	Spain; Susana Rodríguez; Guide: Sara Loehr	Italy; Anna Barbaro; Guide: Charlotte Bonin	France; Annouck Curzillat; Guide: Céline Bousrez

== See also ==
- Triathlon at the 2020 Summer Olympics
