= Céline Bousrez =

French triathlete and duathlete (born 1977)

Personal information
- National team: France
- Born: 14 November 1977 (age 48)

Sport
- Sport: Paratriathlon; duathlon
Medal record
Women's paratriathlon
Representing France
Paralympic Games
Bronze medal – third place	Tokyo 2020	Paratriathlon PTVI; Guide for Annouck Curzillat

Céline Bousrez (born 14 November 1977) is a French triathlete and duathlete. She is a three-time French long-distance duathlon champion between 2016 and 2018 and French long-distance triathlon champion in 2018.

== Background ==
Bousrez practiced several sports in her youth, running, cross country, rowing. Non-professional, she works part-time as a school teacher and has two children. She discovered triathlon in 2013 and has since worked on her progress with her coach Gérard Lopez.

== Career ==
In 2013, Bousrez created a surprise by winning the Natureman, ahead of the favorite Alexandra Louison, whom she beat by 32 seconds at the end, for her first participation in this long-distance triathlon.

A novice in chained sports in 2016 and after winning the Mont Blanc long-distance triathlon, Bousrez took part in her first long-distance duathlon at the French championships in Bois-le-Roi. She took control of the event from the first run and arrived at the first transition with a 20-second lead over her first pursuers. She continued to increase her lead on the bike section where she finished this second event with a lead of more than nine minutes over Alice Meigne and ten over Anaïs Robin. Without failing, she finished the second run and crossed the line as the winner to win her first national title. In 2017, she won her second national title in long-distance duathlon in Verruyes, she completed a high-level bike course that largely made up for the fifteen-second delay in the first run. She controlled the second run without failing and won on the finish line. In 2018, she won her third French long-distance duathlon champion title at the end of a race that took place in difficult weather conditions. In Douai, despite the cold, she finished with a five-minute lead over her closest pursuer and won her third title in a row, the first national title in this specialty.

Bousrez won the national long-distance triathlon title the same year. As one of the favorites, she had to surpass herself to win the title. In difficulty at the end of the swimming section where she only came out in 12th position, the race was led by the young Léna Berthelot Moritz, 21 years old. She made a big effort on the bike section and gradually caught up with her competitors to finish in third place at the finish of the second transition. Her experience in duathlon and running in particular being crucial in the final running event, she finally prevailed over her opponents and won her first national triathlon title.
