= Triathlon at the 2020 Summer Paralympics – Women's PTVI =

Women's PTVI at the XVI Paralympic Games
- Venue: Odaiba Marine Park
- Dates: 28 August 2021
- Competitors: 12 from 10 nations

Medalists
1st place, gold medalist(s)		Susana Rodríguez / Sara Loehr Muñoz	Spain
2nd place, silver medalist(s)		Anna Barbaro / Charlotte Bonin	Italy
3rd place, bronze medalist(s)		Annouck Curzillat / Céline Bousrez	France

The Triathlon at the 2020 Summer Paralympics – Women's PTVI event at the 2020 Paralympic Games took place at 8:31 on 28 August 2021 at the Odaiba Marine Park.

== Results ==
Key : T = Transition; L = Lap

Rank	Bib	Name	Nationality	Swim	T1	Bike				T2	Run				Time
Rank	Bib	Name	Nationality	Swim	T1	L1	L2	L3	L4	T2	L1	L2	L3	L4	Time
1st place, gold medalist(s)	606	Susana Rodríguez; Guide: Sara Loehr Muñoz	Spain	12:29	1:17	7:53	7:44	7:50	8:09	0:57	4:34	5:21	5:17	5:44	1:07:15
2nd place, silver medalist(s)	608	Anna Barbaro; Guide: Charlotte Bonin	Italy	12:46	1:26	7:57	8:02	8:06	8:11	0:58	5:03	5:58	6:08	6:36	1:11:11
3rd place, bronze medalist(s)	604	Annouck Curzillat; Guide: Céline Bousrez	France	14:41	1:23	7:59	7:55	7:58	8:12	1:05	4:57	5:46	5:48	6:01	1:11:45
4	601	Alison Peasgood; Guide: Nikki Bartlett	Great Britain	12:28	1:22	7:43	7:53	7:58	8:07	1:01	4:43	5:31	5:30	5:43	1:11:47
5	607	Jessica Tuomela; Guide: Marianne Hogan	Canada	12:35	1:19	8:06	7:54	8:02	8:16	1:10	5:54	6:26	6:28	6:43	1:12:53
6	605	Katie Kelly; Guide: Briarna Silk	Australia	12:27	1:08	8:01	8:04	8:07	8:13	0:55	4:57	5:39	5:42	6:00	1:13:01
7	602	Melissa Reid; Guide: Hazel Macleod	Great Britain	12:12	1:29	7:56	8:02	8:11	8:25	0:51	4:55	5:57	6:03	6:35	1:14:24
8	609	Elizabeth Baker; Guide: Jillian Elliott	United States	13:07	1:09	8:12	8:11	8:09	8:32	0:52	9:39	4:57	5:43	6:14	1:14:45
9	612	Ksenia Vibornykh; Guide: Alena Zubova	RPC	14:45	1:37	8:55	8:45	8:38	8:51	1:13	5:05	5:47	5:55	6:27	1:15:58
10	603	Vita Oleksiuk; Guide: Liliia Baranovska	Ukraine	13:44	1:23	8:19	8:11	8:16	8:28	0:53	5:18	5:58	6:12	6:33	1:17:03
11	611	Atsuko Maruo; Guide: Hideki Kikuchi	Japan	13:47	1:32	8:27	8:37	8:39	8:46	1:16	5:41	6:39	6:42	7:05	1:20:59
12	610	Amy Dixon; Guide: Kirsten Sass	United States	14:01	1:28	8:32	8:19	8:22	8:32	1:02	6:12	7:04	7:05	7:41	1:22:06
