= Triathlon at the 2022 Commonwealth Games – Men's PTVI =

Men's triathlon PTVI at the 2022 Commonwealth Games
- Venue: Sutton Park, West Midlands
- Date: 31 July 2022
- Competitors: 10 from 5 nations

Medalists
gold medal	David Ellis / Luke Pollard	England
silver medal	Sam Harding / Luke Harvey	Australia
bronze medal	Jonathan Goerlach / David Mainwaring	Australia

The men's PTVI triathlon is part of the Triathlon at the 2022 Commonwealth Games program. The competition will be held on 31 July 2022 in Sutton Park near Sutton Coldfield, West Midlands. The event will feature eleven triathletes from six nations, and eleven sighted guides. This is the second men's paratriathlon at the Commonwealth Games, and the first for athletes with a visual impairment.

== Schedule ==
All times are British Summer Time

Date	Time	Round
Sunday 31 July 2022	09:31	Final race

== Competition format ==
The race will be held over the "sprint distance" and consist of swimming, road bicycling, and road running. Triathletes were selected on the basis of World Triathlon para-triathlon PTVI rankings, with one quota held over for the bipartite invitation process, awarded to James Njorogi of Kenya, though ultimately he did not contest the race.

== Results ==
Rank	Triathlete	Class	Comp	Swimming	T1	Cycling	T2	Running	Total time	Diff
1st place, gold medalist(s)	Dave Ellis (ENG); Guide : Luke Pollard	PTVI	2:46	9:46	1:07	26:57	0:25	16:38	57:39	
2nd place, silver medalist(s)	Sam Harding (AUS); Guide : Luke Harvey	PTVI	2:46	10:52	1:02q	28:46	0:35	18:08	1:02:09	+4:30
3rd place, bronze medalist(s)	Jonathan Goerlach (AUS); Guide : David Mainwaring	PTVI	2:46	13:00	1:24	28:46	0:31	18:54	1:05:21	+7:42
4	Rhys Jones (WAL); Guide : Rhys James	PTVI	2:46	13:07	1:19	28:50	0:29	19:31	1:06:02	+8:23
5	Oscar Kelly (ENG); Guide : Charlie Harding	PTVI	2:46	10:22	1:01	34:18	0:26	17:45	1:06:38	+8:59
6	Gerrard Gosens (AUS); Guide : Hayden Armstrong	PTVI	0:00	13:40	1:49	30:35	0:36	22:01	1:08:41	+11:02
7	Gavin Kilpatrick (RSA); Guide : Casper Moodie	PTVI	2:46	13:13	1:30	30:09	0:33	21:46	1:10:07	+12:28
8	Iain Dawson (ENG); Guide : Duncan Shea-Simonds	PTVI	2:46	14:21	1:26	30:27	0:33	22:35	1:12:08	+14:29
9	Oliver Gunning (NIR); Guide : Kyle Duncan	PTVI	2:46	13:03	1:15	35:45	0:37	24:09	1:17:35	+19:56
DNS	David Jones (RSA); Guide : Rohan Kennedy	PTVI								
