= Greg Billington =

American triathlete (born 1989)

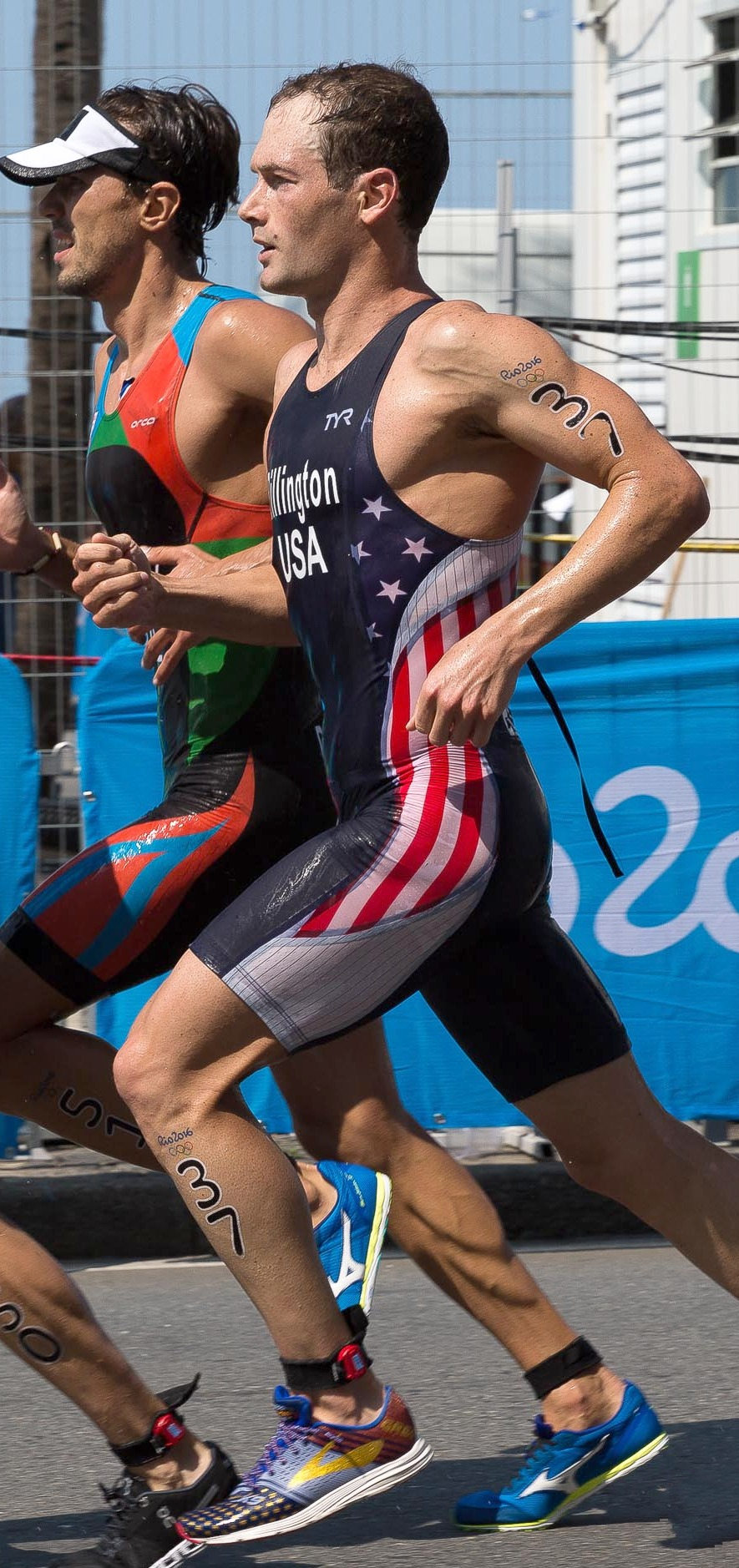
- Billington at the 2016 Olympics

Personal information
- Full name: Gregory Billington
- Born: May 30, 1989 (age 37) Spokane, Washington, U.S.
- Education: Wake Forest University
- Height: 176 cm (5 ft 9 in)
- Weight: 65 kg (143 lb)

Sport
- Country: United States
- Sport: Triathlon / Paratriathlon guide
Medal record
Men's Paratriathlon
Representing United States
Paralympic Games
Gold medal – first place	Tokyo 2020	Paratriathlon PTVI; Guide for Brad Snyder

Gregory Billington (born May 30, 1989) is an American triathlete. He was born in the United States and raised in Six Mile Bottom, England. He traveled a lot in his youth when his father served as instructor on U.S. military bases. He started competing in triathlon aged 10 and placed 37th at the 2016 Rio Olympics.

After retiring from elite-level triathlon, he has continued his elite-level athleticism, participating in marathons, winning two marathons in 2019 and participating in the 2020 Olympic Marathon Trials, finishing 37th at 2:17:21.

Billington followed it up by returning to triathlon as a guide to Brad Snyder at the Paratriathlon PTVI category, winning the 2020 Summer Paralympics gold, as sighted guides are eligible for medals.

Billington won the 2022 Burning Man Ultra (50K) with a time of 3:13:58.
