= Margie Santimaria =

Italian triathlete

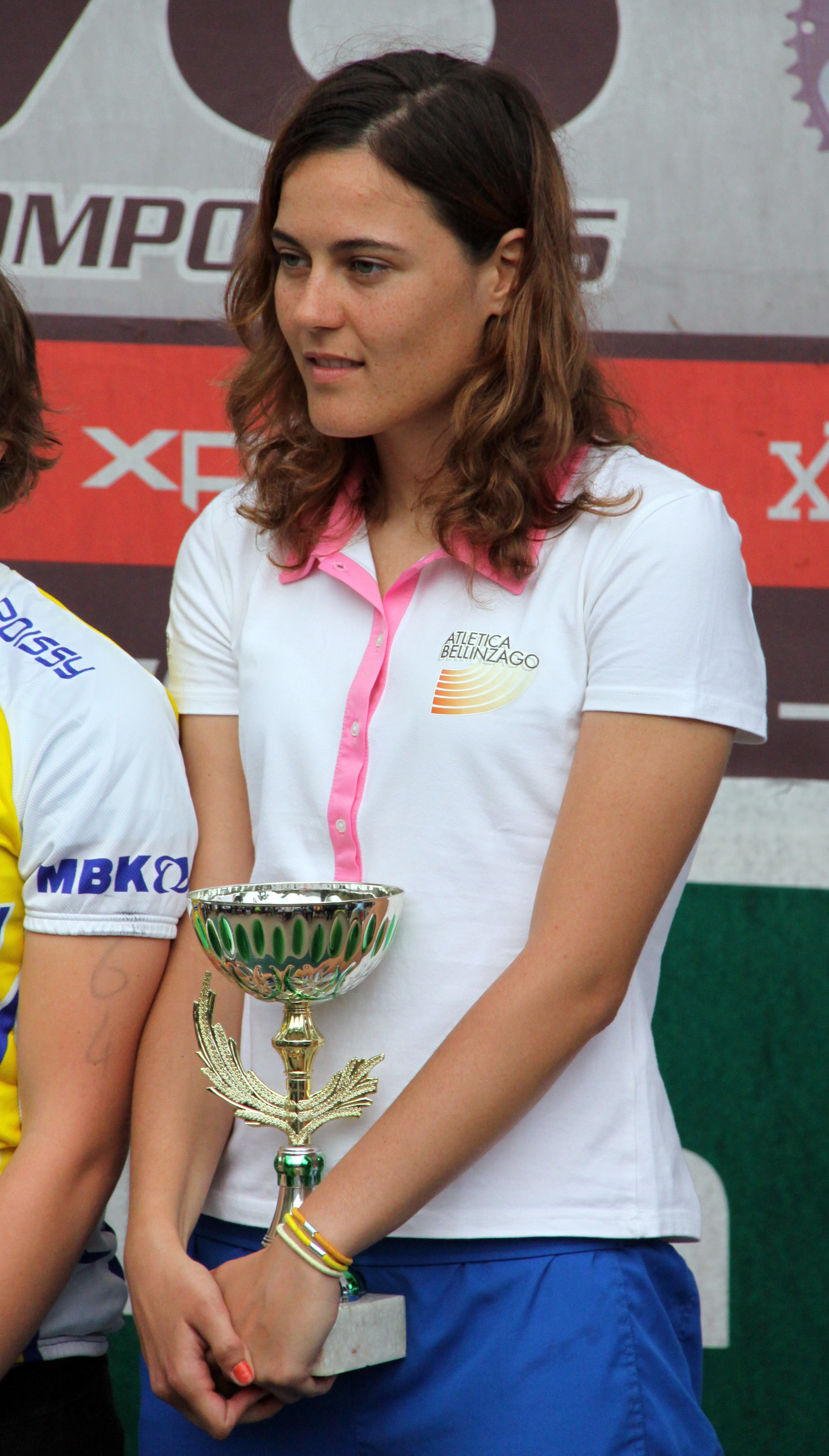
- Margie Santimaria at the Triathlon di Andora, 2010.

Personal information
- Nationality: Italian
- Born: 18 February 1989 (age 37) Vigevano, Italy

Sport
- Sport: Triathlon
- Club: Fiamme Oro

Margie Santimaria (born 18 February 1989), is an Italian professional triathlete, National U23 Champion of the year 2010 and number 4 in the National Elite Ranking 2010.

== Biography ==
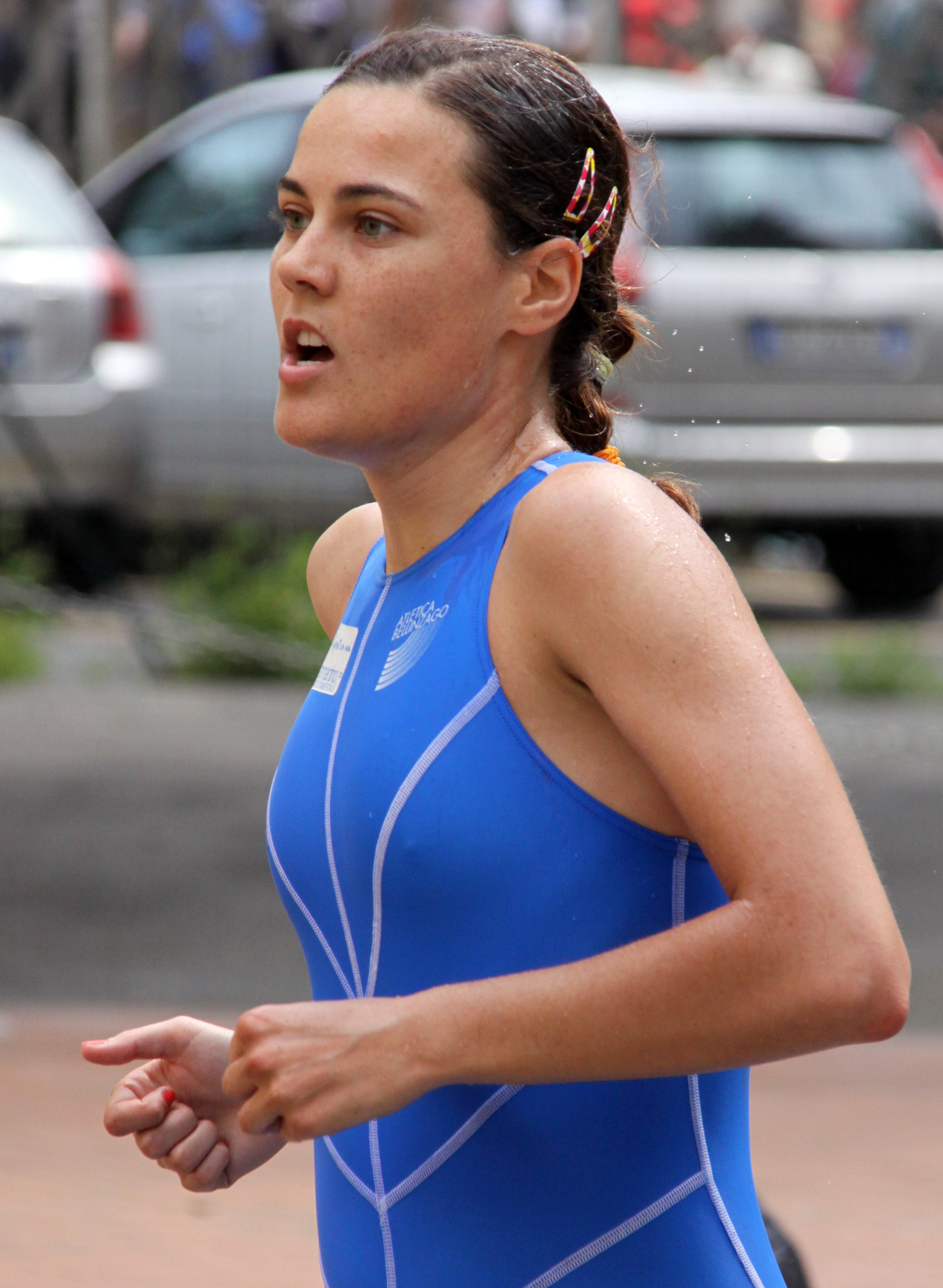
Margie Santimaria at the Triathlon di Andora, 2010

In Italy, Margie Santimaria represents Atlectica Bellinzago and Gruppi Sportivi Polizia di Stato Fiamme d'Oro. In 2010, Santimaria also took part in the prestigious French Club Championship Series Lyonnaise des Eaux representing TriClub Nantais like her country fellow Charlotte Bonin. Santimaria took part in only one of the five triathlons of this circuit and placed 22nd at Beauvais (13 June 2010), thus being the second best of her French club, which could not nominate any French triathlete.

In 2008 Margie Santimaria concluded the secondary school ISIS A. Omodeo in Mortara, close to her native town Vigevano.

== ITU Competitions ==
In the four years from 2007 to 2010 Santimaria took part in 7 ITU races. From 2010 on she has competed in the Elite category only. The following list is based upon the official ITU rankings and the athlete's Profile Page. Unless indicated otherwise, the following competitions are triathlons and belong to the Elite category.

Date	Competition	Place	Rank
2007-06-29	European Championships (Junior)	Copenhagen	31
2008-05-10	European Championships (Junior)	Lisbon	25
2008-07-12	European Cup (Junior)	Tiszaújváros	13
2009-06-20	European Championships (U23)	Tarzo Revine	21
2010-04-11	European Cup	Quarteira	30
2010-05-22	European Cup	Senec	16
2010-08-15	European Cup	Geneva	14

DNS = did not start • DNF = did not finish

== PTO Competition ==
On 20 August 2023 Santimaria completed the PTO Asian Open in Singapore and finished in 11th place.
