= Anna Barbaro =

Italian Paralympic triathlete (born 1985)

Personal information
- Born: 27 March 1985 (age 41) Reggio Calabria, Italy

Sport
- Country: Italy
- Sport: Para Triathlon
- Disability: Visually impaired
- Club: G.S. Fiamme Azzurre
Medal record
Women's paratriathlon
Representing Italy
Paralympic Games
Silver medal – second place	2020 Tokyo	PTVI
World Championships
Silver medal – second place	2021 Abu Dhabi	PTVI
European Championships
Bronze medal – third place	2018 Tartu	PTVI
Bronze medal – third place	2019 Valencia	PTVI

Anna Barbaro (born 27 March 1985) is an Italian Paralympic triathlete. She won silver, with her guide Charlotte Bonin, in the Women's PTVI in Tokyo on 28 August 2021.
