= Triathlon at the 2020 Summer Paralympics – Men's PTVI =

Men's PTVI at the XVI Paralympic Games
- Venue: Odaiba Marine Park
- Dates: 28 August 2021
- Competitors: 10 from 7 nations

Medalists
1st place, gold medalist(s)		Brad Snyder / Greg Billington	United States
2nd place, silver medalist(s)		Héctor Catalá Laparra / Gustavo Rodríguez Iglesias	Spain
3rd place, bronze medalist(s)		Satoru Yoneoka / Kohei Tsubaki	Japan

The Triathlon at the 2020 Summer Paralympics – Men's PTVI event at the 2020 Paralympic Games took place at 08:30 on 28 August 2021 at the Odaiba Marine Park.

== Results ==
Key : T = Transition; L = Lap

Rank	Bib	Name	Nationality	Swim	T1	Bike				T2	Run				Time
Rank	Bib	Name	Nationality	Swim	T1	L1	L2	L3	L4	T2	L1	L2	L3	L4	Time
1st place, gold medalist(s)	624	Brad Snyder; Guide: Greg Billington	United States	10:35	1:13	7:17	7:10	7:16	7:26	0:48	4:11	4:54	4:59	5:27	1:01:16
2nd place, silver medalist(s)	625	Héctor Catalá Laparra; Guide: Gustavo Rodríguez Iglesias	Spain	10:44	0:54	7:16	7:04	7:06	7:19	0:42	3:46	4:21	4:36	5:02	1:02:11
3rd place, bronze medalist(s)	621	Satoru Yoneoka; Guide: Kohei Tsubaki	Japan	11:49	1:22	7:22	7:21	7:17	7:34	0:54	4:10	4:45	4:45	5:01	1:02:20
4	628	Thibaut Rigaudeau; Guide: Cyril Viennot	France	10:39	0:54	7:04	7:03	6:57	7:14	0:46	4:06	4:47	4:48	5:09	1:02:48
5	623	Kyle Coon; Guide: Andy Potts	United States	12:09	1:09	7:27	7:07	7:17	7:28	0:55	4:25	4:55	5:05	5:03	1:03:00
6	627	Antoine Perel; Guide: Olivier Lyoen	France	12:23	1:14	7:33	7:28	7:26	7:40	0:50	4:21	4:52	4:59	5:03	1:03.49
7	626	Jose Luis García Serrano; Guide: Pedro José Andújar Bastida	Spain	11:53	1:05	7:29	7:26	7:23	7:28	0:51	4:19	5:19	5:17	5:25	1:03:55
8	630	Jonathan Goerlach; Guide: David Mainwaring	Australia	13:23	1:23	7:25	7:19	7:17	7:30	0:50	3:56	4:31	4:31	4:52	1:06:18
DNF	629	Dave Ellis; Guide: Luke Pollard	Great Britain	13:11	1:00	7:13									
DSQ	622	Anatolii Varfolomieiev; Guide: Kostiantyn Viechkanov	Ukraine	13:20	1:18	7:52	7:55	7:53	8:43	1:00	4:29	5:07	5:09	5:38	1:08:24
