= Gustavo Rodríguez Iglesias =

Spanish bicycle racer (born 1979)

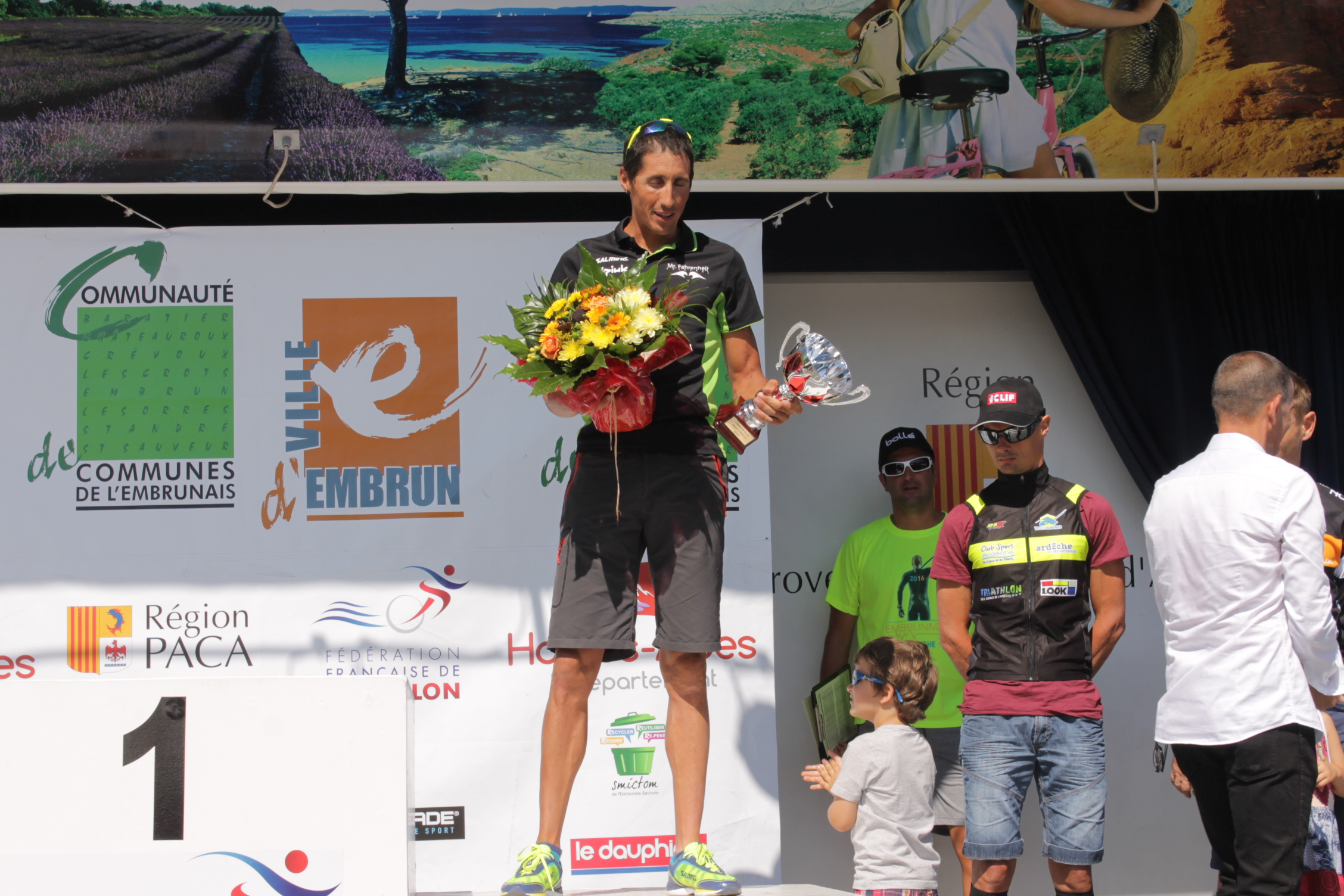
- Gustavo Rodriguez Iglesias 2016

Personal information
- Full name: Gustavo Rodríguez Iglesias
- Born: September 16, 1979 (age 47) Tui, Pontevedra, Spain

Cycling career
- Sport: Cycling
- Current team: Retired
- Discipline: Road
- Role: Rider

Amateur teams
- 2002–2003: CC Spol–Caixa Nova
- 2009: Artesania de Galicia–Cidade de Lugo
- 2013–2016: Club Ciclista Rias Baixas

Professional teams
- 2005–2007: Barbot–Pascoal
- 2008–2009: Fercase–Rota dos Móveis
- 2010: Xacobeo–Galicia
Medal record
Men's Paratriathlon
Representing Spain
Paralympic Games
Silver medal – second place	Tokyo 2020	Paratriathlon PTVI; Guide for Héctor Catalá Laparra

Gustavo Rodríguez Iglesias (born 16 September 1979) is a Spanish former professional cyclist and Paralympic guide. He rode in the 2010 Vuelta a España.

As a Paralympic guide, he led Héctor Catalá Laparra to 2020 Summer Paralympics silver in the paratriathlon PTVI category. Under IPC rules, guides win medals along with their competitors.

== Major results ==
2009
8th Overall Vuelta Ciclista a León

2020
Second in 2020 Paralympics Men's Triathlon PTVI (Guide for Héctor Catalá Laparra)
