= Warren Lawton =

Australian Paralympic athlete

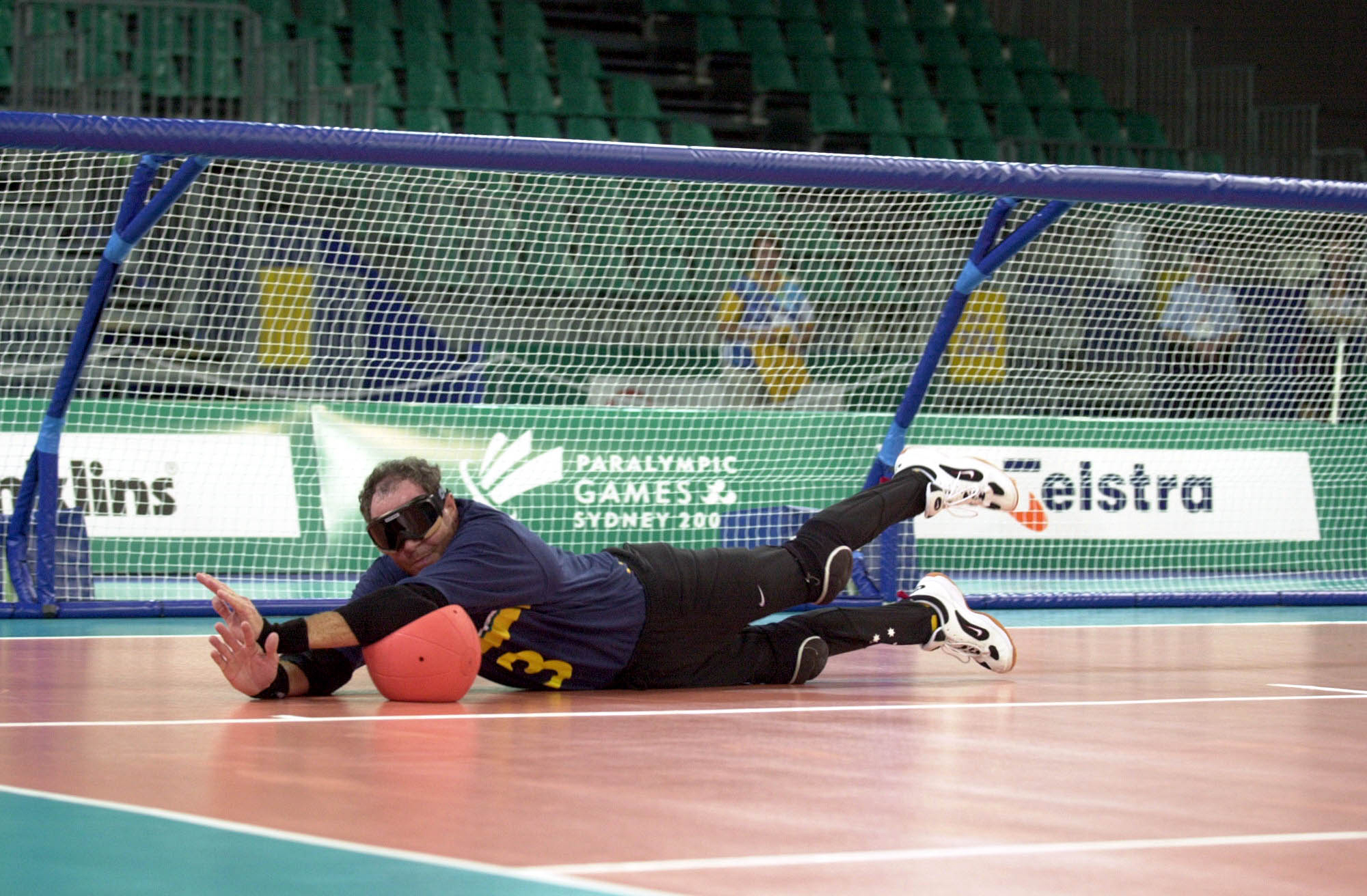
- Lawton saves a penalty shot during a goalball game for Australia against Sweden at the 2000 Sydney Paralympics

Personal information
- Born: 23 March 1966 (age 60) Augathella, Queensland, Australia
Medal record
Athletics
Representing Australia
Paralympic Games
Bronze medal – third place	1984 New York	Men's High Jump B3

Warren Lawton (born 23 March 1966) is an Indigenous Australian Paralympic athletics and goalball competitor with a visual impairment.

He was born on 23 March 1966 in Augathella, Queensland and has been visually impaired since birth. At the 1984 New York Games, he competed in three athletics events and won a bronze medal in the Men's High Jump B3. He won a bronze medal in the Men's High Jump at the 1986 World Championships for the Disabled, Gothenburg, Sweden. He competed in two athletics events at the 1988 Seoul Games.

He was a member of the Australian Goalball Team at the 1992 Barcelona, 1996 Atlanta and 2000 Sydney Games. He was one of the fastest goalball throwers in the world. His throw has been clocked on the police radar at 80 km per hour. After the 2000 Games, he took up coaching.

In 1986 he was awarded the NAIDOC Aboriginal Sportsman of the Year and in 2001 the NAIDOC Sportsperson of the Year.
