= Sam Harding (athlete) =

Australian Paralympic athlete (born 1991)

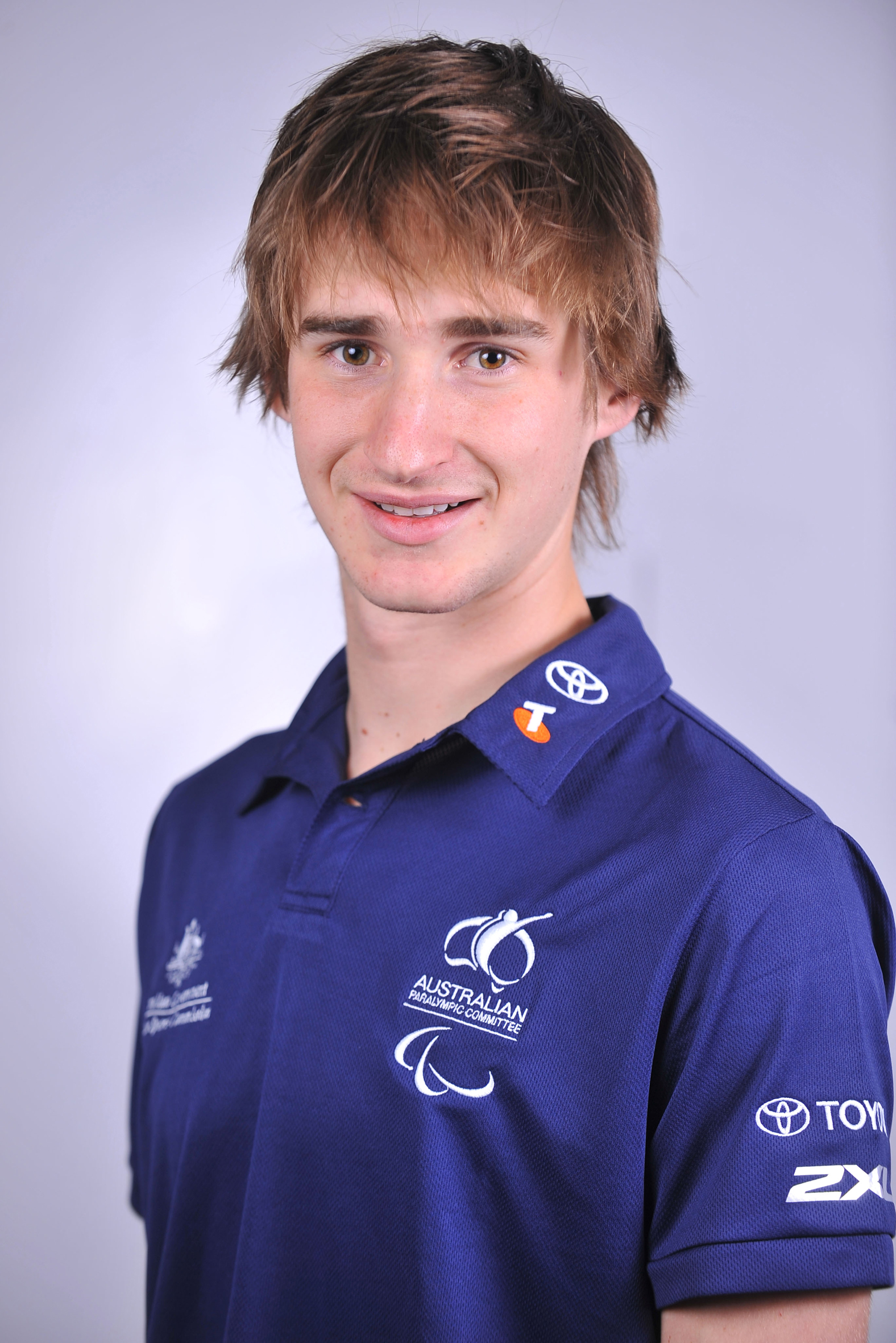
- 2012 Australian Paralympic team portrait of Harding

Personal information
- Born: 11 May 1991 (age 35) Perth, Australia
- Height: 1.79 m (5 ft 10 in)
Medal record
Representing Australia
Men's Track and Field
Australian Athletics Championships
Silver medal – second place	2013 Sydney	800m Ambulant
Silver medal – second place	2014 Melbourne	400m Ambulant
IPC Athletics Grand Prix -
Silver medal – second place	2015 Brisbane	400m Ambulant
Men's Paratriathlon
Oceania Championships
Gold medal – first place	2022 Stockton	PTVI
Commonwealth Games
Silver medal – second place	2022 Birmingham	PTVI

Sam Harding (born 11 May 1991) is an Australian Paralympic athlete and paratriathlete. His classification is T12 and competed in 400m and the 800m events. He represented Australia at the 2012 Summer Paralympics and 2020 Summer Paralympics in athletics and has been selected to compete in paratriathlon at the 2024 Paris Paralympics.

== Personal ==
Harding was born in Perth on 11 May 1991. He has a visual impairment called choroideremia, which is a hereditary condition and has resulted in him losing most of his peripheral vision. Harding attended Wesley College in Perth where he competed in rowing and completed a course in massage therapy.

== Sporting career ==
Harding began his sporting career as a tandem cyclist competing for Western Australia.

=== Athletics ===
He then switched to running after winning three gold medals, in the 400m, 800m and 1500m, at the 2009 Paralympic Youth Games in Melbourne. After this success, Harding was recognised by the Australian Paralympic Committee's Paralympic Talent Search Program and fast-tracked into a talent development camp held in Canberra.

Between 2010 and 2012, Harding received a dAIS scholarship and moved to the Australian Institute of Sport to train.

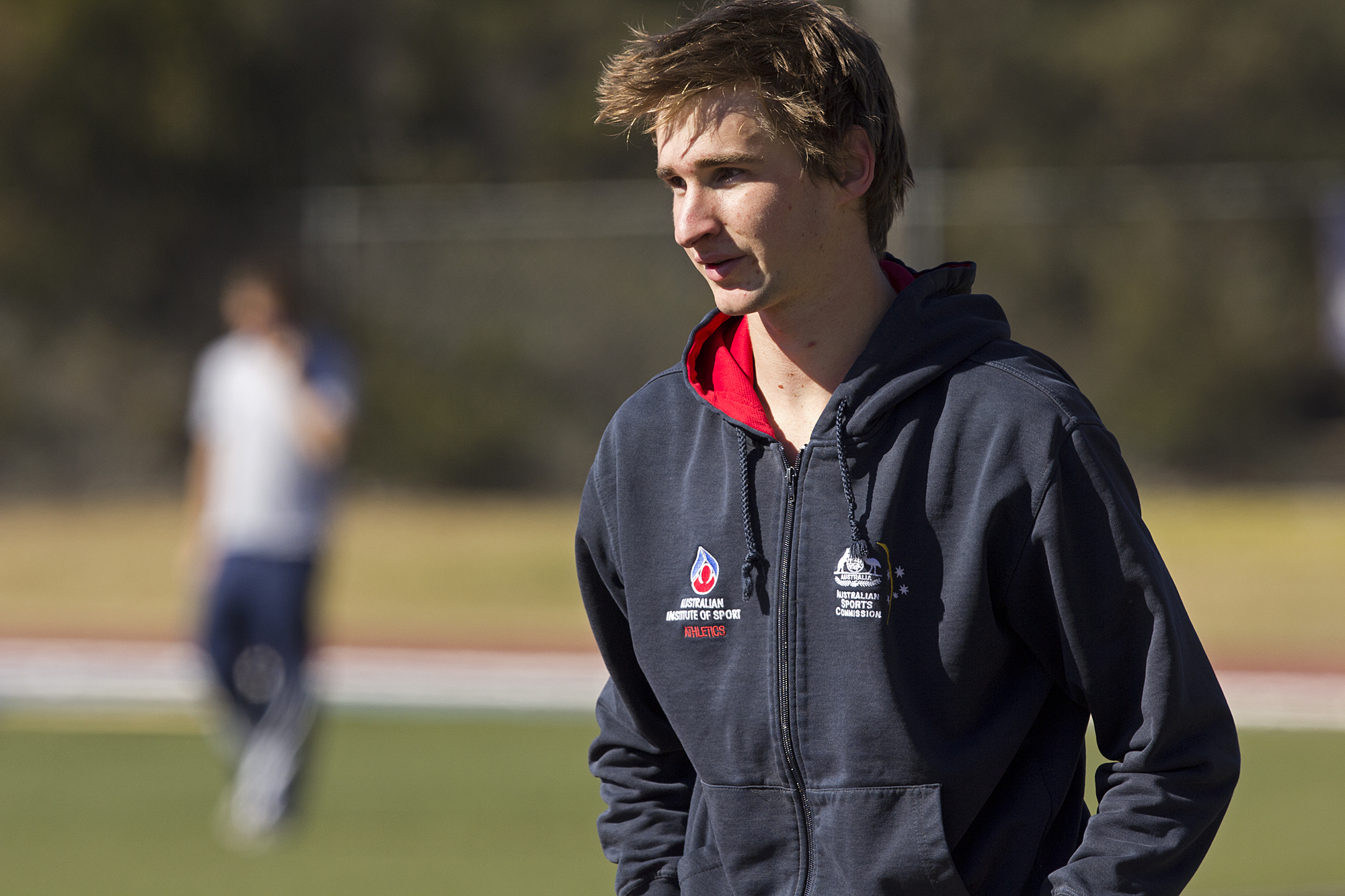
Paralympic athlete Sam Harding at the AIS Track and Field

In 2010, Harding competed in the 2010 national championships where he won bronze in the 800m. He was then selected to represent Australia at the 2011 International Paralympic Committee Athletics World Championships, in Christchurch, where he achieved a personal best and German Nationals where he finished fifth in both 800m events.

Harding was selected to represent Australia at the 2012 Summer Paralympic Games. However, he fell ill prior to his event, the T13 800m, and was unable to compete.

He competed at the 91st and 92nd Australian Athletics Championships where he won silver in the men's 800m and 400m respectively.

In 2015, Harding won silver in the Men's 400m at the 2015 IPC Athletics Grand Prix held in Brisbane.

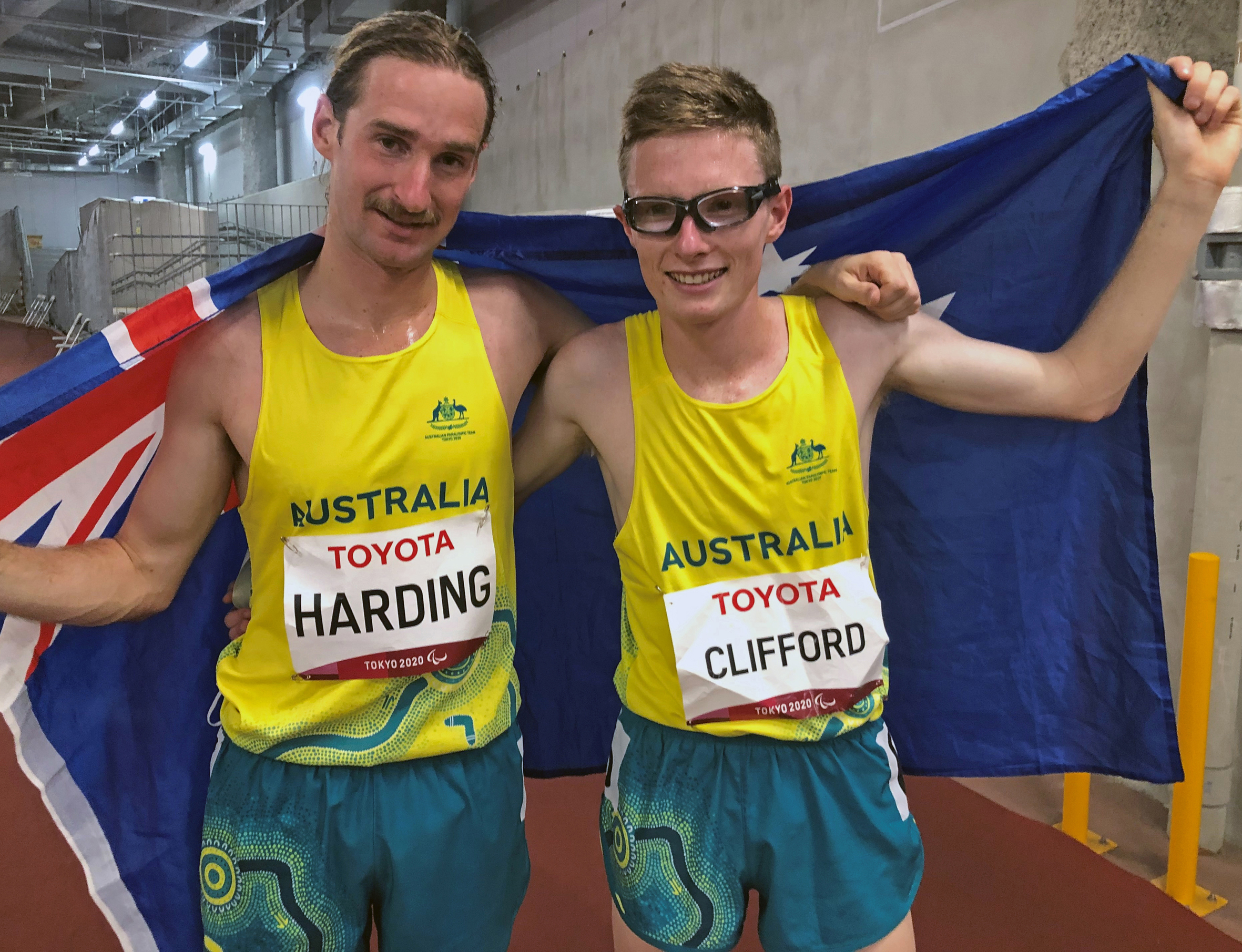
Jaryd Clifford and Sam Harding after Clifford won bronze medal in Men's 1500m.

At the 2020 Summer Paralympics in the Men's 1500 m T13, he finished eleventh.

He was coached by Iryna Dvoskina and Philo Saunders at the Australian Institute of Sport in Canberra.

=== Triathlon ===
At the 2022 Commonwealth Games in Birmingham, England with guide Luke Harvey, he won the silver medal in the Men's PTVI. Harding went into the 2024 Paris Paralympics ranked eighth in the Men's PTVI and finished fifth with guide is Aaron Royle, Olympian at the 2016 and 2020 Games.

At the 2025 World Triathlon Para Championships in Wollongong, with guide Aaron Royle, he finished fourth in the Men's PTVI.

== Recognition ==
- 2022 - Canberra Sports Awards - Para Athlete of the Year
