= Jonathan Goerlach =

Australian triathlete

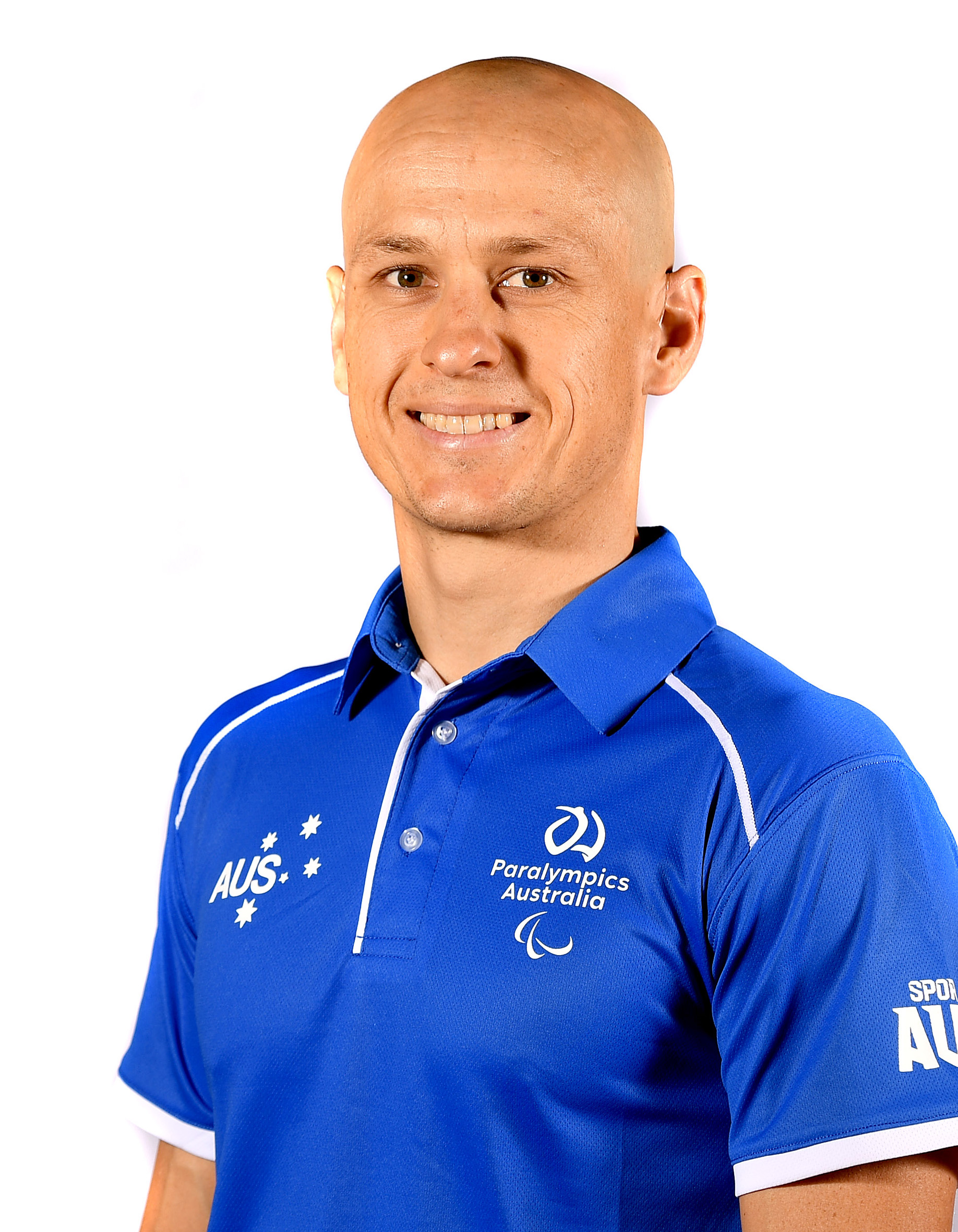
- Jonathon Goerlach in 2019

Personal information
- Born: 7 November 1982 (age 43) Nowra, New South Wales

Sport
- Country: Australia
- Sport: Men's paratriathlon
- Disability class: PTVI
Medal record
Representing Australia
Men's paratriathlon
Oceania Championships
Gold medal – first place	2014 Penrith	PT5
Gold medal – first place	2015 Penrith	PT5
Gold medal – first place	2016 Devonport	PT5
Gold medal – first place	2017 Devonport	PTVI
Gold medal – first place	2019 Newcastle	PTVI
Gold medal – first place	2020 Newcastle	PTVI
Commonwealth Games
Bronze medal – third place	2022 Birmingham	PTVI
Men's para-duathlon
World Championships
Gold medal – first place	2015 Adelaide	PT5

Jonathan Goerlach (born 7 November 1982) is an elite Australian triathlete with a disability. He represented Australia at the 2020 Summer Paralympics.

== Early life and education ==
Goerlach was born on 7 November 1982 in Nowra, New South Wales. He has usher syndrome, which means he has moderate hearing loss, is night-blind and has only tunnel vision. He attended Bomaderry High School. He has a Bachelor of Sports Management from the University of Canberra.

== Career ==
Goerlach made his triathlon debut in 2012 and represented Australia at his first ITU World Championships in Auckland later that year. His para triathlon category (PTVI) was not a medal event at 2016 Summer Paralympics.

In 2018, he moved to Wollongong, New South Wales and is coached by 2012 London Olympian Brendan Sexton.

At the 2020 Summer Olympics Goerlach competed in PTVI and finished eighth. His guide at the 2020 Summer Paralympics was David Mainwaring.

At the 2022 Commonwealth Games, Goerlach with guide David Mainwaring won the bronze medal in the Men's PYVI.

In 2021, he is a New South Wales Institute of Sport athlete.

In 2021, he was awarded the Triathlon Australia's Male Paratriathlon Performance of the Year award after a season of racing culminating in a gold medal at the 2020 Devonport ITU World Paratriathlon Series.

Career Highlights:

- 2016 Rotterdam ITU Paratriathlon World Championships - 10th
- 2017 Devonport OTU Triathlon Oceania Championships - 1st
- 2017 Gold Coast ITU World Paratriathlon Series - 1st
- 2017 ITU World Triathlon Grand Final Rotterdam - 6th
- 2018 Edmonton ITU World Paratriathlon Series -1st
- 2019 Yokohama ITU World Paratriathlon Series - 2nd
- 2019 Tokyo ITU Paratriathlon World Cup - 3rd
- 2020 Devonport ITU World Paratriathlon Series - 1st
- 2021 Tokyo Summer Paralympics - 8th in PTVI
- 2022 Commonwealth Games - 3rd PTVI
