= Triathlon at the 2020 Summer Paralympics – Men's PTS4 =

Men's PTS4 at the XVI Paralympic Games
- Venue: Odaiba Marine Park
- Dates: 28 August 2021
- Competitors: 10 from 9 nations

Medalists
1st place, gold medalist(s)		Alexis Hanquinquant	France
2nd place, silver medalist(s)		Hideki Uda	Japan
3rd place, bronze medalist(s)		Alejandro Sánchez Palomero	Spain

The Triathlon at the 2020 Summer Paralympics – Men's PTS4 event at the 2020 Paralympic Games took place at 06:30 on 28 August 2021 at the Odaiba Marine Park. The PTWC classification combined two functional classifications, both of which used handbikes and racing wheelchairs for the bike and run respectively, but with different impairment levels. To ensure as far as possible even competition, therefore, PTWC2 athletes were given a delay at the start of 3 minutes 08 seconds, a time period calculated as sufficient to even out the performance difference between that class and the more impaired PTWC1 class.

== Results ==
Key : T = Transition; L = Lap

Rank	Bib	Name	Nationality	Swim	T1	Bike				T2	Run				Time
Rank	Bib	Name	Nationality	Swim	T1	L1	L2	L3	L4	T2	L1	L2	L3	L4	Time
1st place, gold medalist(s)	424	Alexis Hanquinquant	France	9:42	1:06	7:31	7:34	7:37	7:41	0:43	3:54	4:31	4:36	5:03	59:58
2nd place, silver medalist(s)	427	Hideki Uda	Japan	12:52	1:11	7:30	7:34	7:41	7:45	0:52	3:55	4:37	4:42	5:06	1:03:45
3rd place, bronze medalist(s)	421	Alejandro Sánchez Palomero	Spain	11:14	1:19	7:42	7:48	7:56	8:03	0:50	4:18	4:55	4:54	5:25	1:04:24
4	429	Wang Jiachao	China	11:15	1:24	8:03	8:01	7:57	8:09	0:56	4:18	4:55	4:49	5:07	1:04:54
5	422	Antonio Franko	Croatia	11:16	2:08	7:53	7:59	7:55	8:00	1:19	4:15	4:48	4:56	5:20	1:05:49
6	426	Eric McElvenny	United States	11:50	1:17	8:13	7:58	8:02	8:04	1:22	4:31	4:49	4:56	5:26	1:06:28
7	430	Jorge Luis Fonseca	Brazil	12:53	1:09	7:56	8:16	8:21	8:37	0:57	4:19	5:12	4:56	5:21	1:07:57
8	423	Michael Taylor	Great Britain	10:11	1:30	8:33	8:17	8:10	8:09	0:59	4:33	5:39	5:55	6:15	1:08:11
9	425	Jamie Brown	United States	11:57	1:20	8:05	7:51	8:04	8:16	0:58	4:54	5:42	5:54	6:11	1:09:12
10	428	Mikhail Kolmakov	RPC	14:15	1:23	8:19	8:41	8:56	8:47	0:53	4:07	4:47	4:54	5:17	1:10:19
