= Australia men's national goalball team =

Australian national team, for the Paralympic sport of goalball

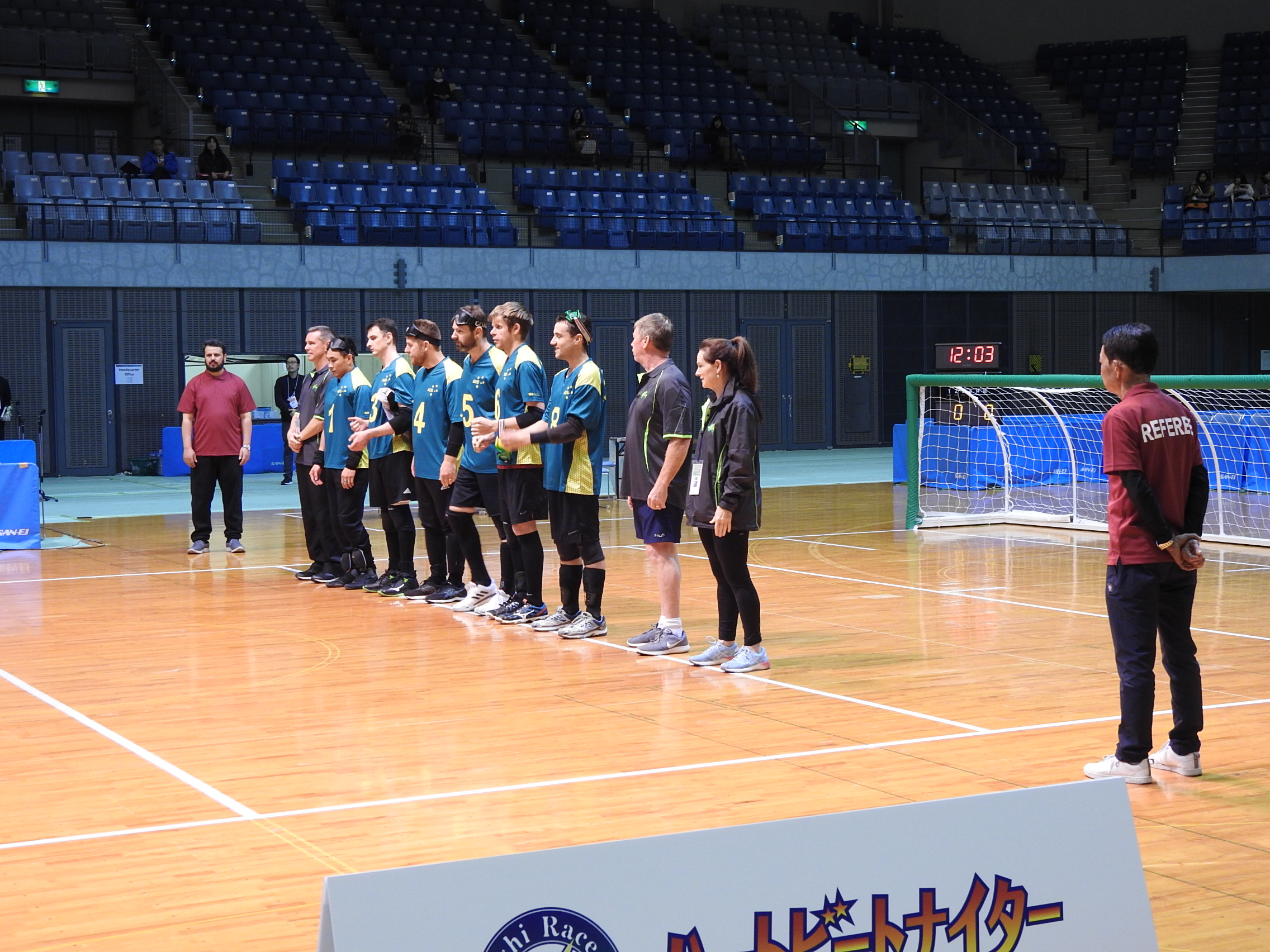
- Australia line-up for a game with South Korea. Regional championships, Chiba, Japan (2019).
- Nicknames: Aussie Storm
- Short name: Storm
- Sport: Goalball
- Founded: 1980
- League: IBSA
- Division: Men
- Region: IBSA Oceania (competitively, IBSA Asia-Pacific)
- Location: Australia
- Colours: Green, Gold
- Championships: Paralympic Games medals::0: 0: 0 World Championship medals:: 0: 0: 0
- Parent group: Goalball Australia; Blind Sports Australia; Paralympics Australia
- Website: www.goalballaustralia.org

Goalball is a team sport designed specifically for athletes with a vision impairment. Australia commenced its involvement in the sport in 1980. Its men's team has completed in trans-Tasman competitions, the IBSA World Goalball Championships, and the Paralympic Games.

About 2015, the men's squad adopted the name 'Aussie Storm', whilst the women's squad became 'Aussie Belles'.

== Squad ==
The team generally has up to nine members—six athletes and three staff. The coaching position is advertised every four years.

The Australian Paralympic Committee Paralympic Preparation Program has previously provided scholarships to help fund player training. Goalball national team members who have been part of this program include Warren Lawton, Robert Crestani and Kevin Frew. Crestani, Lawton and Frew all competed at the 1996 Paralympics. For Lawton, it was his third Paralympics as a goalball player. Crestani and Frew had both been on the national squad three times before, with the 2000 Summer Paralympics as their fourth time competing in the event. Assistance is now provided by Blind Sports Australia.

== Paralympic Games ==
=== 1980 Arnhem ===
The team competed in the 1980 Summer Paralympics in Arnhem, Netherlands. The team finished thirteenth.

Athletes were Bob Faulkner (Qld), Dave Manera (WA), Jeff McNeill (Vic), and Bruce Sandilands (Vic). The coach was Terry Kenaghan.

=== 1984 New York ===
The team competed in the 1984 Summer Paralympics at Long Island, New York City, United States of America, where thirteen teams participated. The team finished last.

Athletes were Theo Bottom (NSW), Graham Coulton (NSW), Martin Furness (NSW), Gary Sargeant (NSW), and Greg Scott (Qld). Coaches were Mike Downie and Susie Bennett.

=== 1988 Seoul ===
The team competed in the 1988 Summer Paralympics, from 15 to 24 October 1988, in Seoul, South Korea. This was the first time the term "Paralympic" came into official use. Australia finished eleventh of fourteen.

Athletes were Theo Bottom (NSW), Russell Doyle (NSW), Kevin Frew (NSW), Rob Crestani (Vic), Gary Sargeant (NSW), and Tony Telfer (Vic). The coach was Terry Kenaghan.

=== 1992 Barcelona ===
The team competed in the 1992 Summer Paralympics, from 3 to 14 September 1992, in the Pavelló de la Vall d'Hebron indoor stadium, Barcelona, Spain. They finished eleventh place of twelve.

Athletes were Rob Crestani (Vic), Warren Lawton (Qld), Kevin Frew (NSW), Brett Scarr (Vic), and Mark Scarr (Vic). The coach was Sam Theodore.

=== 1996 Atlanta ===
At the 1996 Summer Paralympics, the team finished in fourth place. This was the country's best finish in an international competition. The team had played a number of international matches prior to the start of the games. The team also had an extended training camp in Australia prior to the start of the games. The training camp included psychological preparations. The start of the men's team was Robert Crestani. His ability to throw the ball and his offensive tactics helped the team remain competitive. Other key players for the team included Warren Lawton and Gerrard Gosens. These three players were on the court for almost the whole competition. In pool play, they beat Italy 5–2, the Czech Republic 7–0, the Netherlands 3–2. They drew with Germany 3–3 and Slovenia 4–4. In the Qualification round, they lost to Finland 1–4, drew with Spain 3–3 and lost to Canada 1–3. In the medal elimination round, they lost to Canada 2–3. In the bronze medal match, they lost to Spain 2–6. Australia's win over Italy is important in the team's history because the Italian team was ranked number one in the world coming into the Paralympic Games.

Athletes were Rob Crestani (Vic), Kevin Frew (NSW), Colin George (NSW), Gerrard Gosens (Qld), Warren Lawton (Qld), and Brett Scarr (Vict). Coaches were Sam Theodore and Heather Gossens.

=== 2000 Sydney ===
The team competed as the host nation in the 2000 Summer Paralympics, between 18 and 29 October 2000, at an Olympic Park indoor hall, Sydney, New South Wales, Australia. Of twelve teams, Australia came ninth.

Athletes were Rob Crestani (Vic), Kevin Frew (NSW), Paul Harpur (Qld), Troy King (NSW), Warren Lawton (Qld), and Robbie Vogt (Qld). Coaches were Sam Theodore and Robert Apps.

== World championships competition ==
=== 1986 Roermond ===
The 1986 IBSA World Goalball Championships were held in Roermond, the Netherlands. The team ranked seventeenth of eighteen.

Athletes were Theo Bottom (NSW), Nick Gleeson (Vic), Rodney Mills (NSW), Gary Sargeant (NSW), Greg Scott (Qld), Tony Telfer (Vic), and David Troung (Qld). The coach was Terry Kenaghan, and escort Bruce Hancock.

=== 1994 Colorado Springs ===
The team competed in the 1994 World Championships, in Colorado Springs, Colorado, United States of America. Of thirteen countries, the team finished twelfth.

Athletes were Rob Crestani (Vic), Kevin Frew (NSW), Gerrard Gosens (Qld), Warren Lawton (Qld), and Ivan Shortiss (Vic). Coaches were Sam Theodore and Terry Kenaghan.

=== 1998 Madrid ===
The national team finished ninth at the 1998 IBSA World Goalball Championships held in Madrid, Spain.

Athletes were Rob Crestani (Vic), Kevin Frew (NSW), Colin George (NSW), Warren Lawton (Qld), Steve Morrison (NSW), and Brett Scarr (Vic). Coaches were Sam Theodore and Robert Apps.

=== 2002 Rio de Janeiro ===
The team competed in the 2002 World Championships, in Rio de Janeiro, Brazil, from 30 August 2002 to 8 September 2002. They ranked tenth of fourteen men's teams.

Athletes were Murray Elbourn (NSW), Garvin Francis (ACT), Paul Kennedy (ACT), Benjamin MacFie (Qld), Robbie Vogt (Qld), and Damien Williams (Qld). Coaches were Coach Jonathon Voller and Karen Scott.

=== 2006 Spartanburg ===
The team competed in the 2006 World Championships, in July 2006, in Spartanburg, South Carolina, United States of America. They ranked fourteen of sixteen.

Athletes were Garvin Francis (ACT), Jon Horsburgh (Vic), Michael Sheppard (Qld), David Troung (Qld), and Robbie Vogt (Qld). Coaches were Warren Lawton and Rob Apps.

=== 2010 Sheffield ===
The team competed in the 2010 World Championships, from 20 to 25 June 2010, in Sheffield, England. The team finished thirteenth.

Athletes were Paul Harpur (Qld), Jon Horsburgh (Qld), Paul Kennedy (ACT), Ben MacFie (Qld), Michael Sheppard (Qld), and Robbie Vogt (Qld). The coach was Rob Apps.

=== 2018 Malmö ===
Athletes for the event are: Sam Byrne (Victoria), Jon Horsburgh (Queensland), Daniel Morrish (Western Australia), Daniel Pritchard (Victoria), Issac Toppo (New South Wales), and Thanh Tu (Western Australia). Head coach is Greg Scott (Queensland), assistant coach and manager Robyn Stephensen (Queensland), and physiotherapist Sarah Kelly.

== IBSA World Games ==
=== 2003 Quebec City ===
The team competed in the 2003 IBSA World Games from 1 to 10 April 2011, in Quebec City, Canada. Ten teams competed.

Athletes were Garvin Francis (ACT), Paul Kennedy (ACT), Ben MacFie (Qld), Robbie Vogt (Qld), and Damien Williams (Qld). Coaches were Karen Scott and Robyn Stephens.

=== 2007 São Paulo ===
The team competed in the 2003 IBSA World Games, from 28 July 2007 to 8 August 2007, in São Paulo, Brazil.

Athletes were Jon Horsburgh (Vic), Hamish MacKenzie (Vic), Michael Sheppard (Qld), and Robbie Vogt (Qld). Coaches were Warren Lawton and Rob App.

=== 2011 Antalya ===
The team competed in the 2011 IBSA World Games from 1 to 10 April 2011, in Antalya, Turkey, organised by the Turkish Blind Sports Federation. They placed sixth in Group B, and were twelfth in the final standings.

Athletes were Sam Byrne (Vic), Jon Horsburgh (Qld), Paul Kennedy (ACT), Ben McFie (Qld), Michael Sheppard (Qld), and Robbie Vogt (Qld). The coach was Rob Apps.

=== 2015 Seoul ===
The team competed in the 2015 IBSA World Games from 10 to 17 May 2015, in Seoul, South Korea.

Athletes were Sam Byrne (Vic), Daniel Dalton (Vic), Ben Rowe (WA), Ben MacFie (Qld), Daniel Pritchard (Vic), and Thanh Tu (WA). Coaches were Murray Elbourn and Rob Apps, with physiotherapist Sarah Kelly.

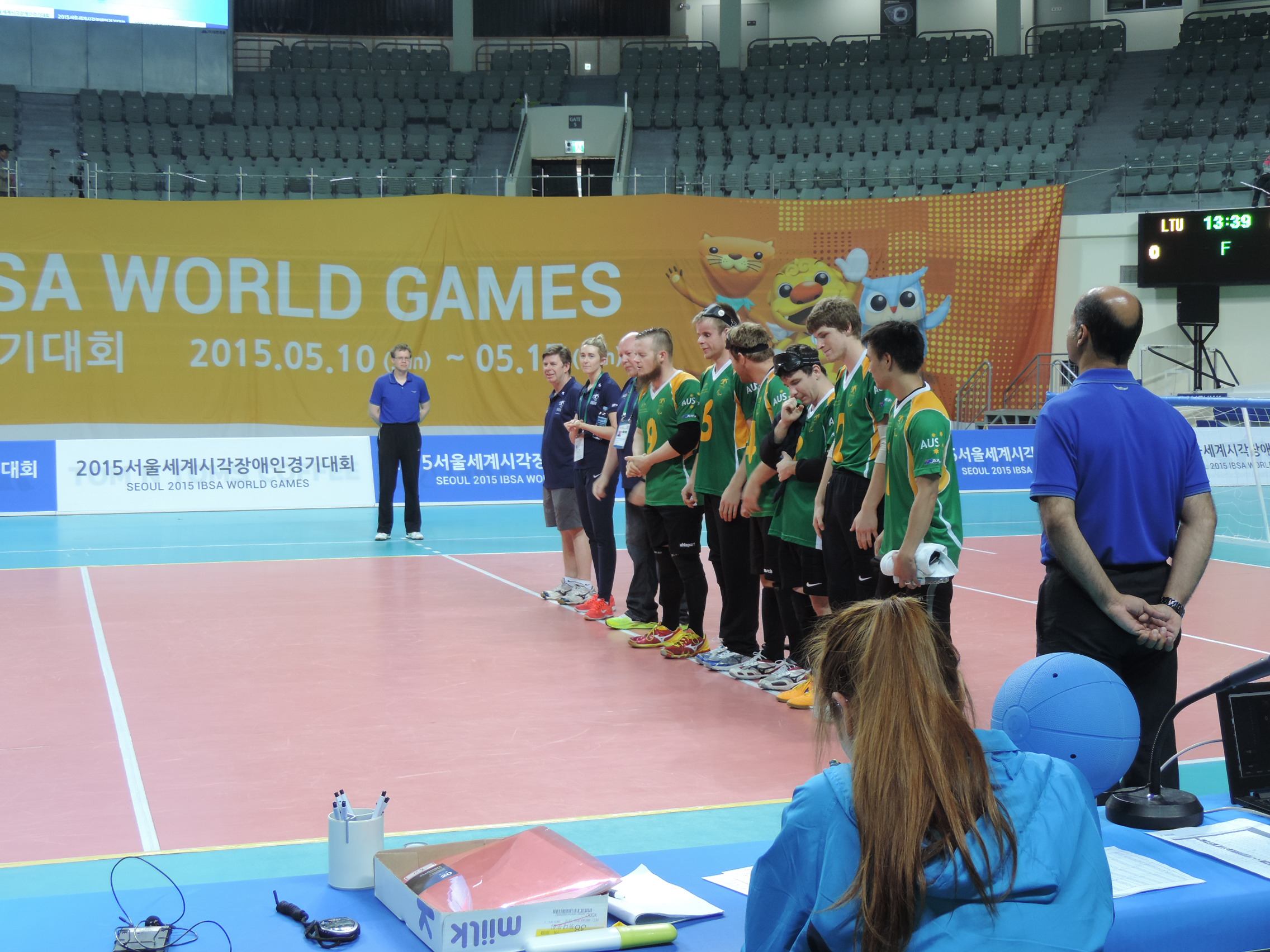
Lined up against Lithuania (May 2015)

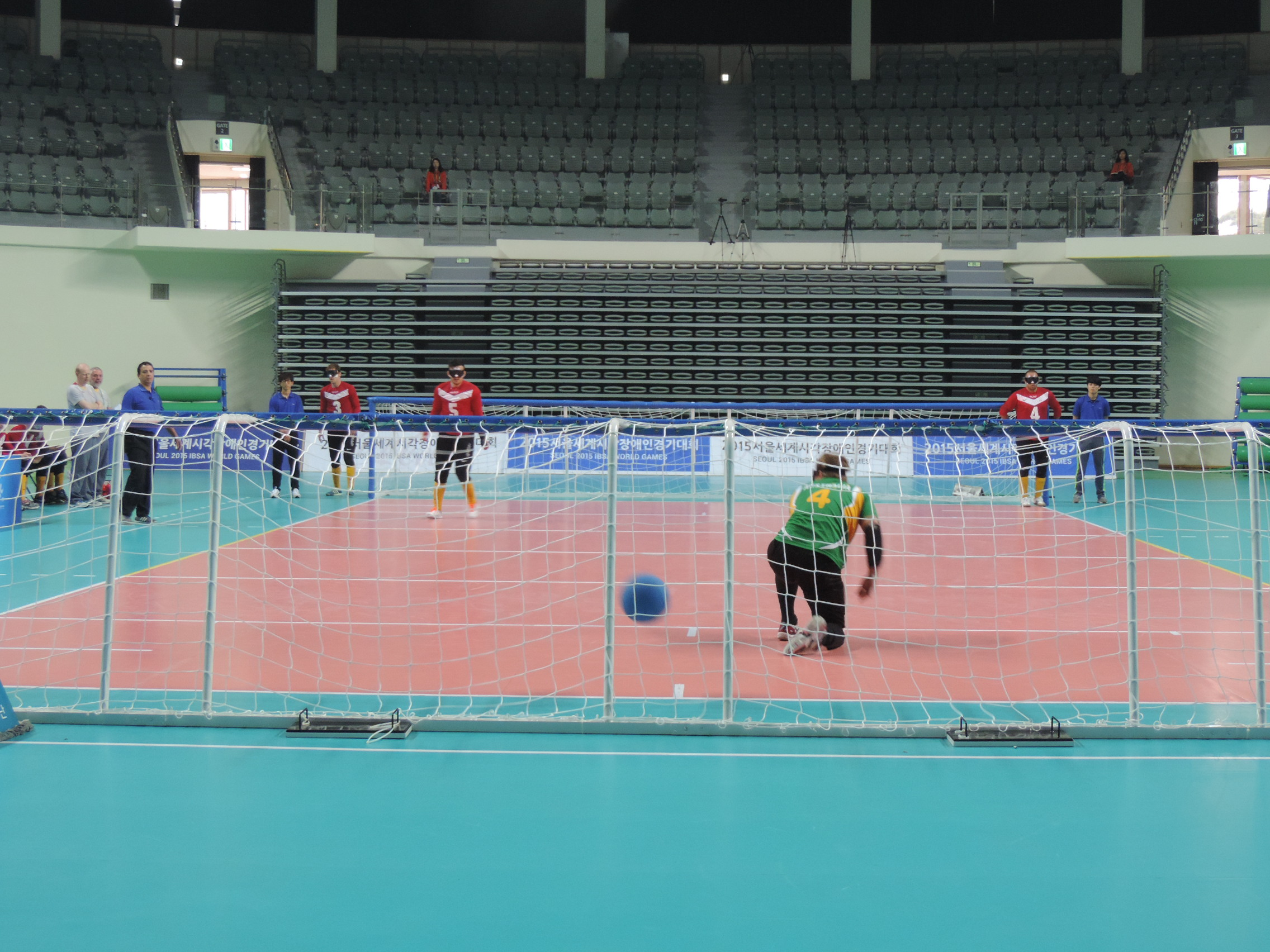
Defending in a penalty situation against Belgium (May 2015)

== Regional championships ==
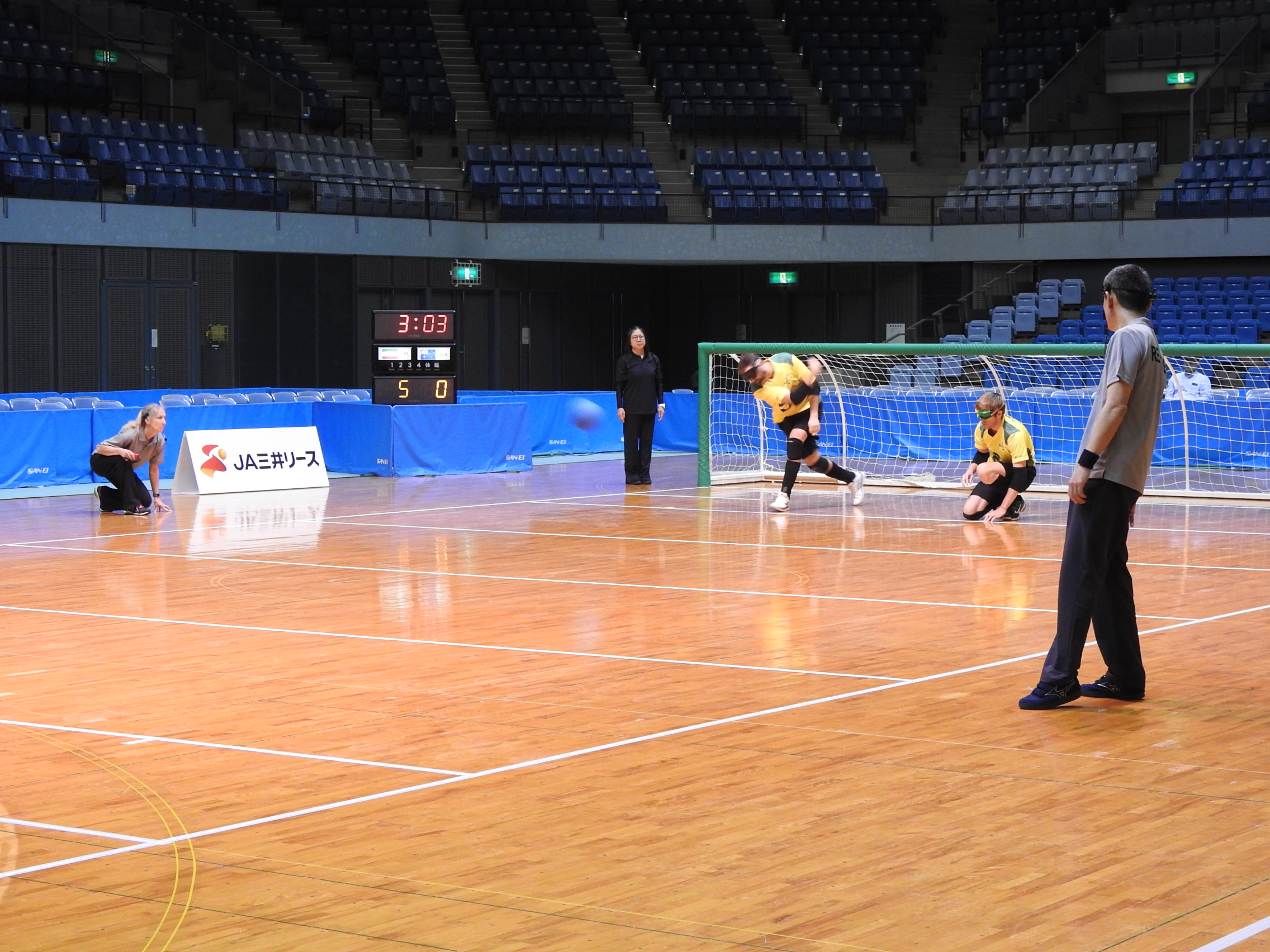
Australia throwing to Iran. Regional championships, Chiba, Japan (2019).

The team competed, generally as the only participating country, in IBSA Oceania goalball region, and from January 2010 became part of the IBSA Asia-Pacific goalball competition region.

=== 2011 Sydney ===
The team competed in a composite tournament, the 2011 IBSA African-Oceania Regional Championships, with games from 15 to 17 November 2011, at the Sydney Olympic Park Sports Centre, Sydney, Australia. Although the four regions under the rules were Africa, America, Asia/Pacific, and Europe, as there were insufficient competitive teams in both Africa and Oceania regions, IBSA agreed to combined championships. For the men's teams, it was Algeria, Australia, and New Zealand; the winner, Algeria, qualifying for the London 2012 Paralympic Games.

Athletes were Jon Horsburgh (Qld), Ben McFie (Qld), Ben Rowe (WA), Michael Sheppard (Qld), Thanh Tu (WA), and Robbie Vogt (Qld). Coaches were Rob Apps and Murray Elbourn.

=== 2013 Beijing ===
The team competed in the 2013 IBSA Asia Pacific Goalball Regional Championships, from 11 to 16 November 2013, in Beijing, China. Of the six men's teams (Australia, China, Iran, Japan, Mongolia, Thailand), Australia ranked fourth, winning two and losing three games.

Athletes were Sam Byrne (Vic), Jon Horsburgh (Qld), Ben Rowe (WA), Michael Sheppard (Qld), Thanh Tu (WA), and Robbie Vogt (Qld). Coaches were Murray Elbourn and Jason Bremner.

=== 2015 Hangzhou ===
The team competed in the 2015 IBSA Asia Pacific Goalball Regional Championships, from 8 to 12 November 2015, in the China National Goalball Training Centre, Hangzhou, China. Of the five men's teams (Australia, China, Iran, Japan, Korea), the team placed fifth.

=== 2017 Bangkok ===
The team competed in the 2017 IBSA Asia/Pacific Goalball Regional Championships, from Monday 21 to Saturday 26 August 2017, in the Thai-Japan Sports Stadium, Din Daeng, Bangkok, Thailand. The Storm attained fourth place, losing to Japan 3:11.

Athletes: #1 Thanh Tu, #3 Michael Sheppard, #4 Steffan Nero, #5 Jon Horsburgh, #6 Sam Byrne, #8 Daniel Morrish.

=== 2019 Chiba ===
The team competed in the 2019 IBSA Goalball Asia-Pacific Regional Championships, from Thursday 5 to Tuesday 10 December 2019, in the Chiba Port Arena, Chiba, Japan. They placed sixth of the seven teams.

Athletes: #1 Thanh Tu, #3 Michael Sheppard, #4 Ben Rowe, #5 Jon Horsburgh, #6 Sam Byrne, #8 Dan Morrish.
Team staff: Coach Greg Scott, assistant coach Andrew Ridley.

=== 2022 Bahrain ===
Due to the COVID-19 pandemic, the 2021 IBSA Goalball Asia-Pacific Regional Championships were moved from November 2021 to 21 March 2022 in Asan, South Korea. The championships was finally held at the Bahrain Sports Federation for Disabilities Sports Centre, in Riffa, Bahrain from Monday 25 July 2022 to Friday 29 July 2022. The top two teams of each division are eligible for the World Championships in December 2022.

There were five men's teams: Australia, Iran, Japan, South Korea, Thailand. They placed fifth in the round-robin.

Athletes: #1 Thanh Tu, #3 Isaiah Muller, #4 Robbie Dunia, #5 Oliver Fanshawe, #7 Daniel Pritchard.
Team staff: Coach Andrew Ridley, assistant coach Peter Corr, staff Olivia Muller.

== Other competitions ==
The men's team competed in the FESPIC Games in Beijing in September 1994, Bangkok in January 1999, and Busan in October 2002.

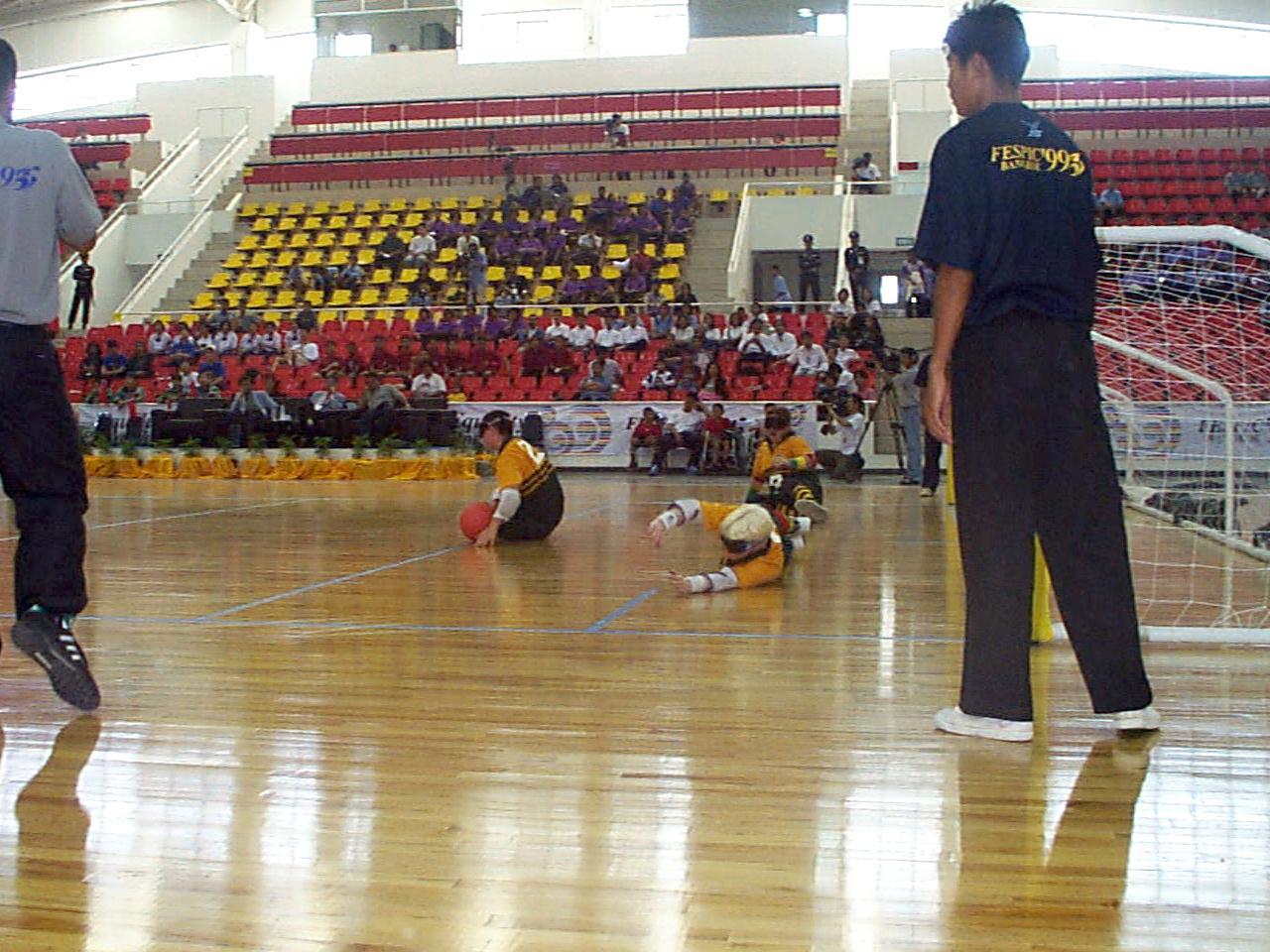
Team defending, Bangkok (January 1999)

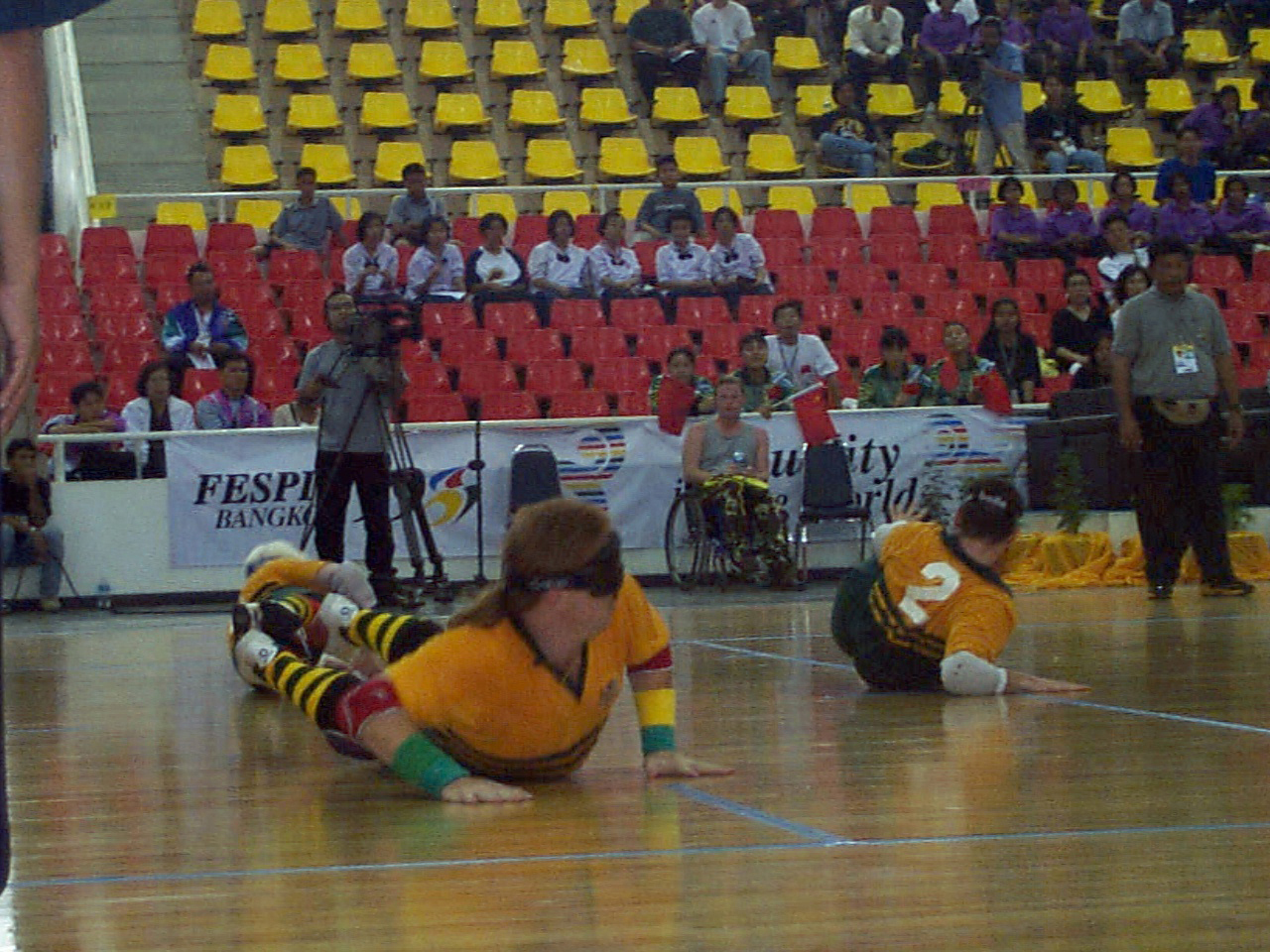
Team defending and preparing to throw, Bangkok (January 1999)

== See also ==
- Australia women's national goalball team
- Australia at the Paralympics
- Parasports

== Bibliography ==
- Australian Paralympic Committee (September 1999). "Goalball – Men". Annual Report – 1999. Sydney, Australia: Australian Paralympic Committee.
- Australian Paralympic Federation (1996). "Golden days of Atlanta : Xth Paralympic Games Atlanta, Georgia, August 15–25, 1996". Sydney, Australia. OCLC 222120061.
