= Gerrard Gosens =

Australian Paralympic athlete (born 1970)

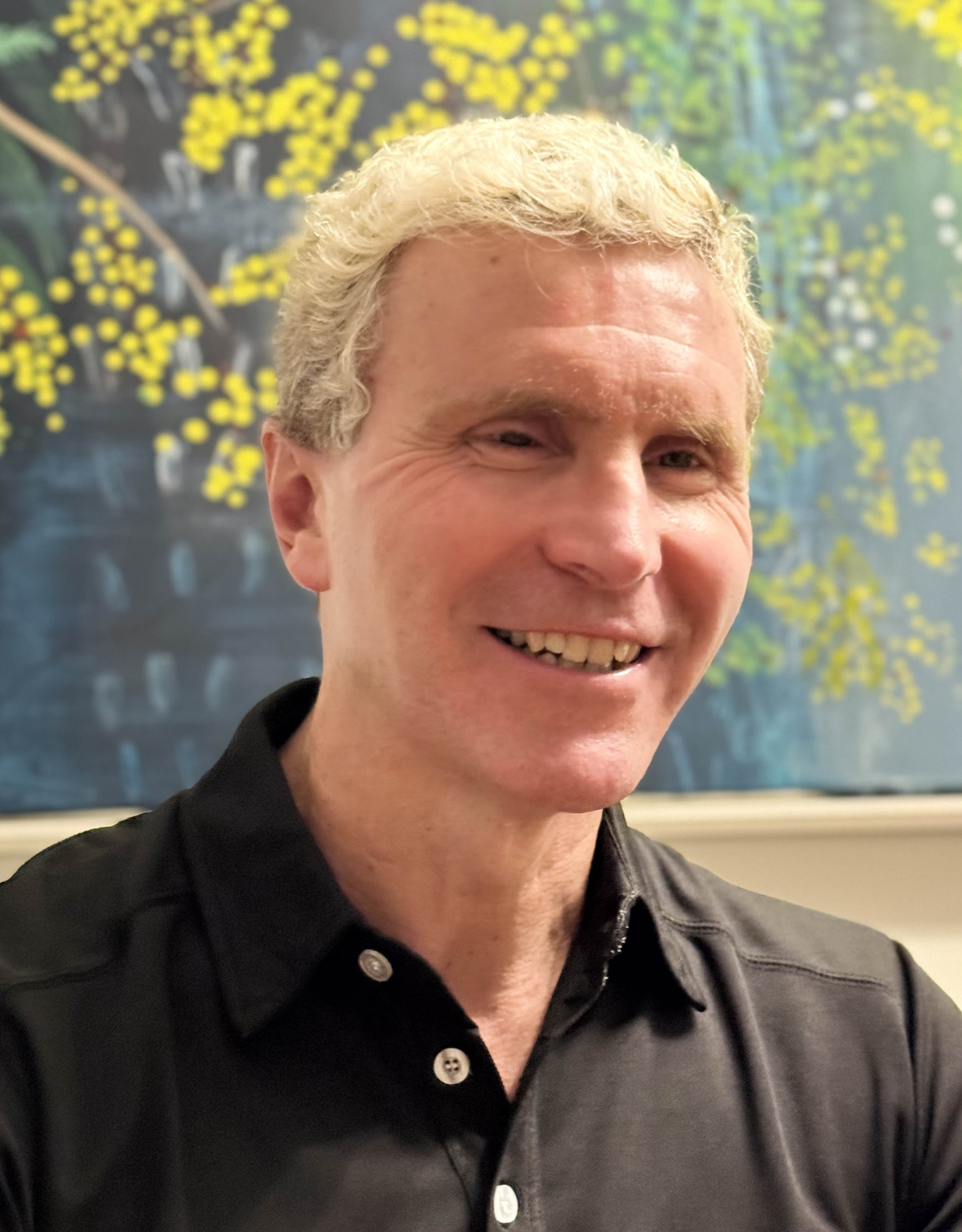
- Gerrard Gosens in 2024

Personal information
- Nationality: (Australia) Australian
- Born: Gerrard James Gosens; 3 February 1970 (age 56) Melbourne, Victoria (Australia)

Sport
- Sport: Goalball, athletics, paratriathlon
Medal record
Men's paratriathlon
Representing Australia
Oceania Championships
Gold medal – first place	2018 St. Kilda	PTVI
Silver medal – second place	2019 Newcastle	PTVI
Silver medal – second place	2020 Newcastle	PTVI

Gerrard James Gosens OAM (born 3 February 1970) is a vision-impaired Australian Paralympic athlete, goalball player, triathlete, adventurer, chocolatier and motivational speaker.

== Personal life ==
Gosens was born on 3 February 1970 in Melbourne, Victoria. He is congenitally blind and became Australia's youngest guide dog recipient at age sixteen. At the age of eleven, his family moved to Yeppoon in Queensland and he attended Yeppoon State High School. He has completed a Business Management degree at Queensland University of Technology (1992–1994) and Bachelor of Journalism at the University of Queensland (1994–1996). From 1994 to 2002, he was employed by the Australian Paralympic Committee. He has been Deputy CEO for Royal Blind Foundation Queensland and worked for Vision Australia. In 2019, he was forced to shut down his business 'Chocolate Moments' in Brisbane due to the disruption caused by the Cross River Rail project.

He married Heather in 1993 and they have two children, son Jordan and daughter Taylor. Taylor was born with his congenital eyesight condition, and has just four per cent vision.

Gosens encourages others with the saying "Every one of us have some sort of obstacle to overcome, instead of letting them getting in the way, we should learn to take advantage of any opportunities we come across".

== Sporting career ==
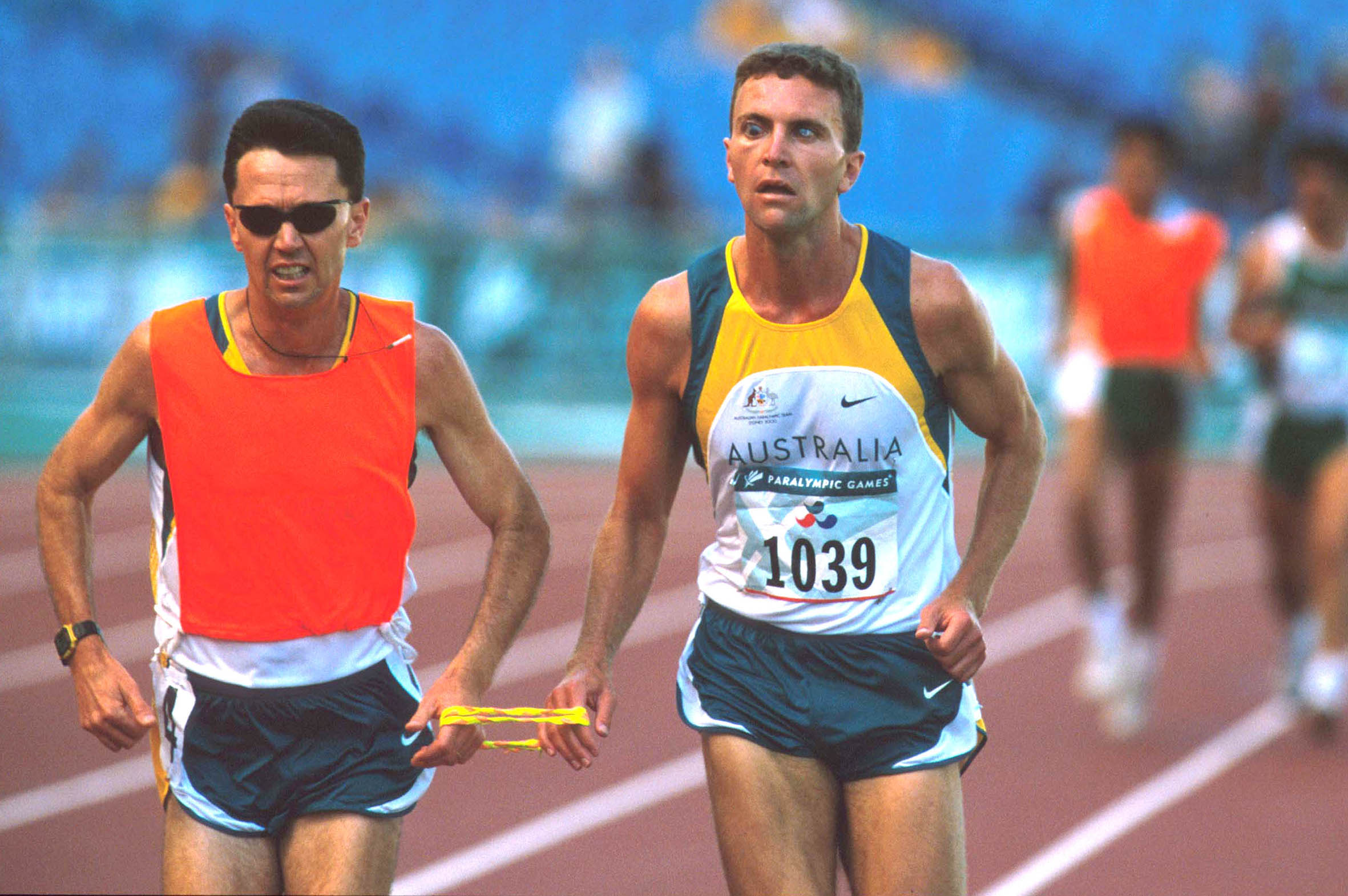
Gosens and guide at 2000 Sydney Paralympics

Gosens is classified as a T11 athlete. Gosens competed at the 1996 Atlanta Paralympics in goalball. At the 2000 Sydney Paralympics, he competed with guides Bill Hunter and Ed Salmon in three running events – sixth in Men's 5000 m T11, sixth in the Men's 10000 m T11 and eight in the Men's Marathon T11. At the 2002 IPC Athletics World Championships, Lille, France, he finished fourth in the Men's 1500 m T11 and sixth in the Men's 5000 m T11. At the 2006 IPC Athletics World Championships, Assen, Netherlands, he finished fifth in the Men's 1500 m T11. At the 2008 Beijing Paralympics with guide Bruce Jones, he finished sixth in the Men's 1500 m T11. At the 2011 IPC Athletics World Championships, Christchurch, New Zealand, he finished fourth in his heat of the Men's 1500 m T11 and was ranked fourth. He was disqualified in his heat of the Men's 5000 m T11.

In 2016, Gosens took up triathlon as a result of using swimming as rehabilitation for an injured knee. He is classified as a B1 paratriathlete. He has the goal of competing in paratriathlon at the 2020 Tokyo Paralympics. In 2019, Gosens was caught up in a doping scandal after his guide Stephen Thompson tested positive to EPO at the 2018 ITU World Championships, Gold Coast, Queensland. Gosens competed with Thompson two days after Thompson won the silver medal at the World Championships 35 to 39 age group race. Gosens was disqualified due to Thompson's EPO test because he was his guide.

At the 2022 Commonwealth Games in Birmingham, England with guide Hayden Armstrong, finished 6th in the Men's PTVI.

== Other activities ==
Gosens has run the 2,000 kilometres (1,200 mi) from Cairns to Brisbane five times to raise money for charity. He has co-piloted an ultra-light motor glider around Queensland three times. His other pursuits include scuba diving, and completing in ultra-marathons.

=== Mount Everest ===
In 2005, Gosens attempted to conquer Mount Everest ended when he fell down a crevasse his guide forgot to tell him about. He had reached the third camp of Mount Everest (7,300 metres (24,000 ft) high).

=== Dancing with the Stars ===
In 2009, Gosens became the first contestant with a vision impairment to compete on the Australian television program Dancing with the Stars, competing during the ninth season. His partner was Jessica Raffa and they were the eighth partnership eliminated. His participation raised funds for Vision Australia. Gosens has raised over A$2 million worth in services and funds for the 120 000 blind people in Australia.

=== Indoor climbing ===
With the inclusion of climbing as an official sport at the 2028 Paralympic Games in Los Angeles, Gosens announced his intention to compete in his fourth Paralympic Games.

== Recognition ==
- 1995 – Young Queenslander of the Year
- 2000 – Ansvar Athlete of the Year
- 2001 – Centenary Medal for distinguished service to sport particularly through the Paralympics
- 2012 – Medal of the Order of Australia for service to people who are blind or vision impaired, and to sport
- 2012 – Fervent Global Love of Lives medal from the Chou Ta-Kuan Cultural and Educational Foundation
- 2018 – International Day of People with Disability Patron

== See also ==
- Australia men's national goalball team
