= Blind Sports Australia =

Blind Sports Australia (BSA; 2010+), formerly the Australian Blind Sports Federation (ABSF) was formed in 1980 as the national body to coordinate sport for the blind and vision-impaired in Australia. It encourages and provides access to international competition in world blind and multi-disabled championships for sports recognised by the International Blind Sports Federation (IBSA) and the International Paralympic Committee (IPC). BSA is headquartered near Melbourne.

Blind and vision impaired athletes and teams participate in national championships in athletics, cricket, equestrian, goalball, golf, judo, karate, lawn bowls, powerlifting, rowing, sailing, swimming, tandem cycling, tenpin bowling, water skiing, wrestling, and winter sports.

== Members ==
=== Member organisations ===
- Australian Blind Bowlers Association (ABBA) since 1980
- Australian Blind Cricket Council (ABCC) since 1951
- Blind Golf Australia (BGA) since 1992
- Goalball Australia (GA) since 1980

=== Member associations ===
The following organisations conduct national championships on behalf of the BSA:

- VISACT
- Blind Sporting Association of New South Wales
- Blind Sport and Recreation Victoria
- Sporting Wheelies and Disabled Association of Queensland
- Association of South Australian Blind Sporting Clubs
- Association for the Blind of WA

Altogether there are 2,600 vision-impaired athletes in whose interests BSA acts at the national and international level for competition, coaching, sport psychology and program development.

BSA athletes are current world champions or world record holders in field athletics, tandem cycling, tenpin bowling, powerlifting, swimming, water skiing and alpine skiing.

== See also ==
- Australia at the Paralympics
- Disabled sports
- Australia men's national goalball team
- Australia women's national goalball team

== Bibliography ==
- Department of Sport, Recreation and Tourism; Australian Sport Commission (1985). Australian Sport, a profile. Canberra, Australia: Australian Government Publish Service. ISBN 0-644-03667-2.
