= Hideki Uda =

Japanese paratriathlete

Medal record

Men's paratriathlon

Representing Japan

Paralympic Games
Silver medal – second place	2020 Tokyo	PTS4

Asian Championships
Gold medal – first place	2023 Samarkand	PTS4
Gold medal – first place	2025 Chiba City	PTS4

Hideki Uda (宇田秀生, Uda Hideki; born 6 April 1987) is a Japanese Paralympic triathlete. At the 2020 Summer Paralympics, he won a silver medal in the Men's PTS4 event.
