= Satoru Yoneoka =

Japanese Paralympic triathlete

Personal information
- Nationality: Japanese
- Born: September 6, 1985 (age 40) Japan

Sport
- Country: Japan
- Sport: Paratriathlon
- Disability class: PTVI
Medal record
Men's paratriathlon
Representing Japan
Paralympic Games
Bronze medal – third place	2020 Tokyo	PTVI
Asian Championships
Gold medal – first place	2023 Samarkand	PTVI

Satoru Yoneoka (born September 6, 1985) is a Japanese PTVI Paratriathlete. He competed at the 2020 Summer Paralympics, winning a bronze medal in the men's PTVI Triathlon.
