= Annouck Curzillat =

French paratriathlete

Personal information
- Born: 12 May 1992 (age 34)

Sport
- Country: France
- Sport: Paratriathlon
- Disability class: PTVI
Medal record
Women's paratriathlon
Representing France
Paralympic Games
Bronze medal – third place	2020 Tokyo	PTVI
World Championships
Silver medal – second place	2023 Ponteverde	Mixed relay
European Championships
Silver medal – second place	2023 Madrid	PTVI

Annouck Curzillat (born 12 May 1992) is a French Paralympic triathlete. At the 2020 Summer Paralympics, she won a bronze medal in the Women's PTVI event.
