= Brad Snyder (swimmer) =

American swimmer (born 1984)

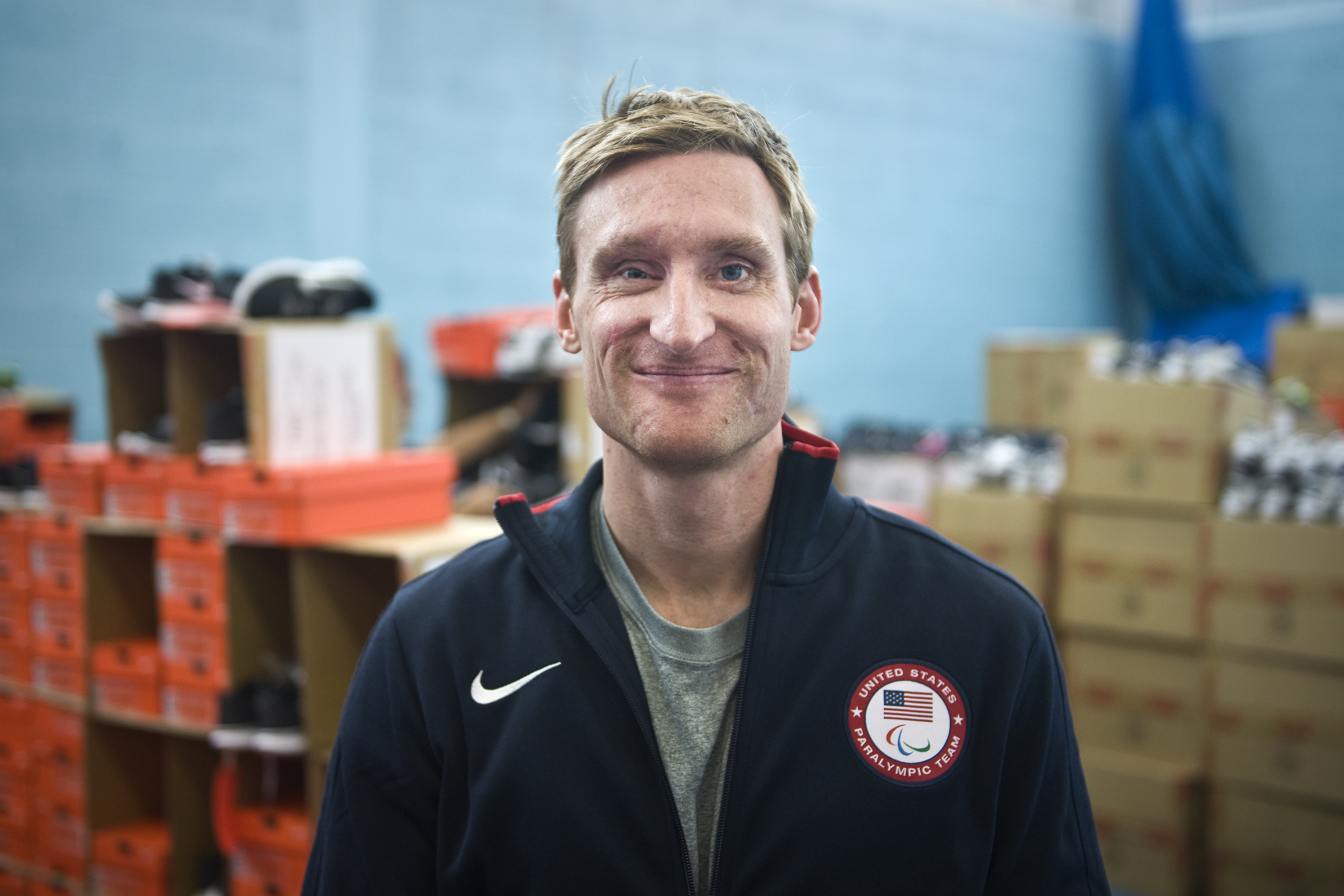
- Brad Snyder shortly before the 2012 London Paralympics

Personal information
- Full name: Bradley Warren Snyder
- Born: February 29, 1984 (age 42) Reno, Nevada, U.S.
- Alma mater: United States Naval Academy

Sport
- Sport: Swimming
- Strokes: 400-meter freestyle 100-meter freestyle
- Coach: Brian Loeffler
Medal record
Representing United States
Men's Swimming
Paralympic Games
Gold medal – first place	2012 London	100m Freestyle S11
Gold medal – first place	2012 London	400m Freestyle S11
Gold medal – first place	2016 Rio	50m Freestyle S11
Gold medal – first place	2016 Rio de Janeiro	100m Freestyle S11
Gold medal – first place	2016 Rio de Janeiro	400m Freestyle S11
Silver medal – second place	2012 London	50m Freestyle S11
Silver medal – second place	2016 Rio de Janeiro	100m Backstroke S11
IPC World Championships
Gold medal – first place	2015 Glasgow	50 m freestyle S11
Gold medal – first place	2015 Glasgow	100 m freestyle S11
Gold medal – first place	2015 Glasgow	400 m freestyle S11
Men's paratriathlon
Paralympic Games
Gold medal – first place	2020 Tokyo	Paratriathlon PTVI
Americas Championships
Gold medal – first place	2021 Pleasant Prairie	PTVI
Bronze medal – third place	2018 Sarasota-Bradenton	PTVI
Bronze medal – third place	2019 Sarasota-Bradenton	PTVI

Bradley Warren Snyder (born February 29, 1984) is an American professional swimmer on the United States Paralympic team who competed at the 2012 Summer Paralympics in London, the 2016 Summer Paralympics in Rio, and the 2020 Summer Paralympics in Tokyo. Snyder won two Gold medals and one Silver at London, three Gold and one Silver at Rio, and one gold medal at Tokyo. He lost his eyesight from an IED explosion while serving in the United States Navy in Afghanistan. Among fully blind swimmers, he is the current world record holder for the 100-meter freestyle events.

== Education and military service ==
Bradley Warren Snyder was born in Reno, Nevada to Michael and Valarie Snyder. He swam while attending Northeast High School in St. Petersburg, Florida. He graduated from the United States Naval Academy in 2006 with a degree in naval architecture; while there, he was captain of the swim team.

Snyder eventually became a lieutenant in the Navy, and served in Afghanistan as an explosive ordnance disposal officer. In September 2011, he lost both of his eyes after stepping on an IED in an attempt to help victims of another bombing. The explosion also gave him lacerations to his face and a shattered eardrum. Snyder subsequently spent three weeks in intensive care, and then recovered for another five weeks in Florida. He explained, "When you're kind of patching your life back together and figuring out how to adjust to blindness, you're not good at anything. Walking was a challenge. Cooking's a challenge. Dressing and color matching is a challenge. There are all these things that used to be no problem that are all of a sudden really challenging. I had a hard time getting the right amount of toothpaste on the toothbrush, because I can't see it."

Snyder was the guest speaker at the 2013 Navy-Marine Corps Ball, held at the Washington Hilton, Washington, DC.

== Swimming career ==
At the May 2012 Warrior Games in Colorado Springs, Snyder won four gold medals in swimming and three gold medals in track and field.

In June 2012 at the U.S. Paralympics Swimming Trials in Bismarck, North Dakota, Snyder won the 400-meter freestyle and beat his own record by 54 seconds. His record time of 4:35.62 made him the current world leader among blind swimmers for the 400-meter freestyle. The race also secured him a spot on the United States Paralympic team at the 2012 Summer Paralympics in London. In addition, Snyder is the world record holder for the 100-meter freestyle among blind athletes, an event that he also swam in Bismarck.

In August 2012 at the Paralympic Games in London, Snyder won Gold in the 100-meter freestyle (S11) after setting a Paralympic Record (57.18) in the preliminary heat. The following day, he won a Silver Medal in the Men's 50m Freestyle (S11) setting an American record for 25.27. Later that week, Snyder won Gold again in the Men's 400m Freestyle (S11) with a time of 4:32.41, exactly one year to the day after losing his eyesight. The United States Olympic Committee selected Brad to serve as the United States' flag bearer for the Closing Ceremony of the London 2012 Paralympic Games.

He competed at the 2016 Paralympic Games in Rio de Janeiro, winning all three gold medals in the end.

At the 2020 Summer Paralympics in Tokyo, Japan, Snyder won the gold medal in the paratriathlon PTVI.

== Other endeavours ==
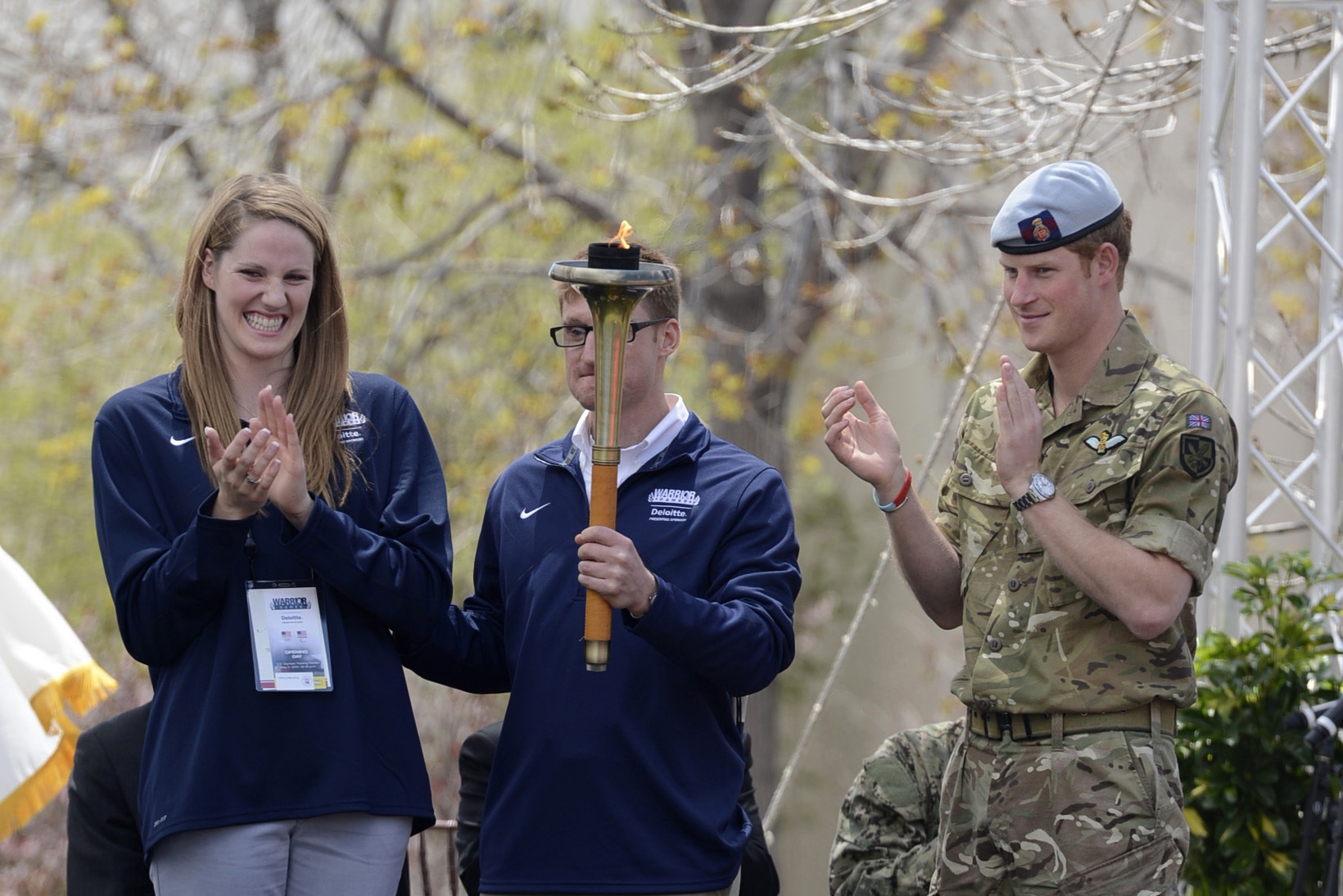
Missy Franklin, Brad Snyder and Prince Harry at 2013 Warrior Games, May 2013

In 2013, Brad became the official spokesman for a tactile timepiece with his namesake, the "Bradley." Created by the product design company Eone Timepieces, the Bradley is designed in collaboration with vision impaired users.

As part of his professional swimming career, Snyder signed on as an athlete for Team Toyota, sponsored by the car company bearing the same name, that is Toyota.

== Fire In My Eyes ==
In 2016, he wrote a memoir with Tom Sileo entitled Fire in My Eyes: An American Warrior's Journey from being Blinded on the Battlefield to Gold Medal Victory.

== See also ==
- Swimming at the Summer Paralympics
- Swimming at the 2012 Summer Paralympics
- Swimming at the 2016 Summer Paralympics
