= Héctor Catalá Laparra =

Spanish Paralympic triathlete

Personal information
- Nationality: Spanish
- Born: 17 June 1988 (age 38) Serra, Spain
- Website: http://www.hectorcatala.es/

Sport
- Country: Spain
- Sport: Paratriathlon
- Disability class: PTVI
Medal record
Representing Spain
Men's paratriathlon
Paralympic Games
Silver medal – second place	2020 Tokyo	PTVI
World Championships
Gold medal – first place	2019 Lausanne	PTVI
Silver medal – second place	2021 Abu Dhabi	PTVI
Bronze medal – third place	2016 Rotterdam	PT5
Bronze medal – third place	2018 Gold Coast	PTVI
European Championships
Gold medal – first place	2016 Lisbon	PT5
Gold medal – first place	2025 Besançon	PTVI
Silver medal – second place	2017 Kitzbühel	PTVI
Silver medal – second place	2019 Valencia	PTVI
Bronze medal – third place	2021 Valencia	PTVI
Bronze medal – third place	2024 Vichy	PTVI
Men's para-aquathlon
World Championships
Gold medal – first place	2025 Pontevedra	PTVI
Silver medal – second place	2015 Chicago	PT5
Men's para-duathlon
World Championships
Bronze medal – third place	2016 Aviles	PT5
European Championships
Gold medal – first place	2017 Soria	PTVI
Gold medal – first place	2018 Ibiza	PTVI

Héctor Catalá Laparra (born 17 June 1988) is an PTVI Paraathlete from Spain.

== Triathlon ==
Catalá started his ITU racing career in 2014, where he had plenty of success due to his strength and determination.

=== Paralympics ===
Catalá competed at the 2020 Summer Paralympics, winning a silver medal in the men's PTVI Triathlon.
