= Charlotte Bonin =

Italian professional triathlete

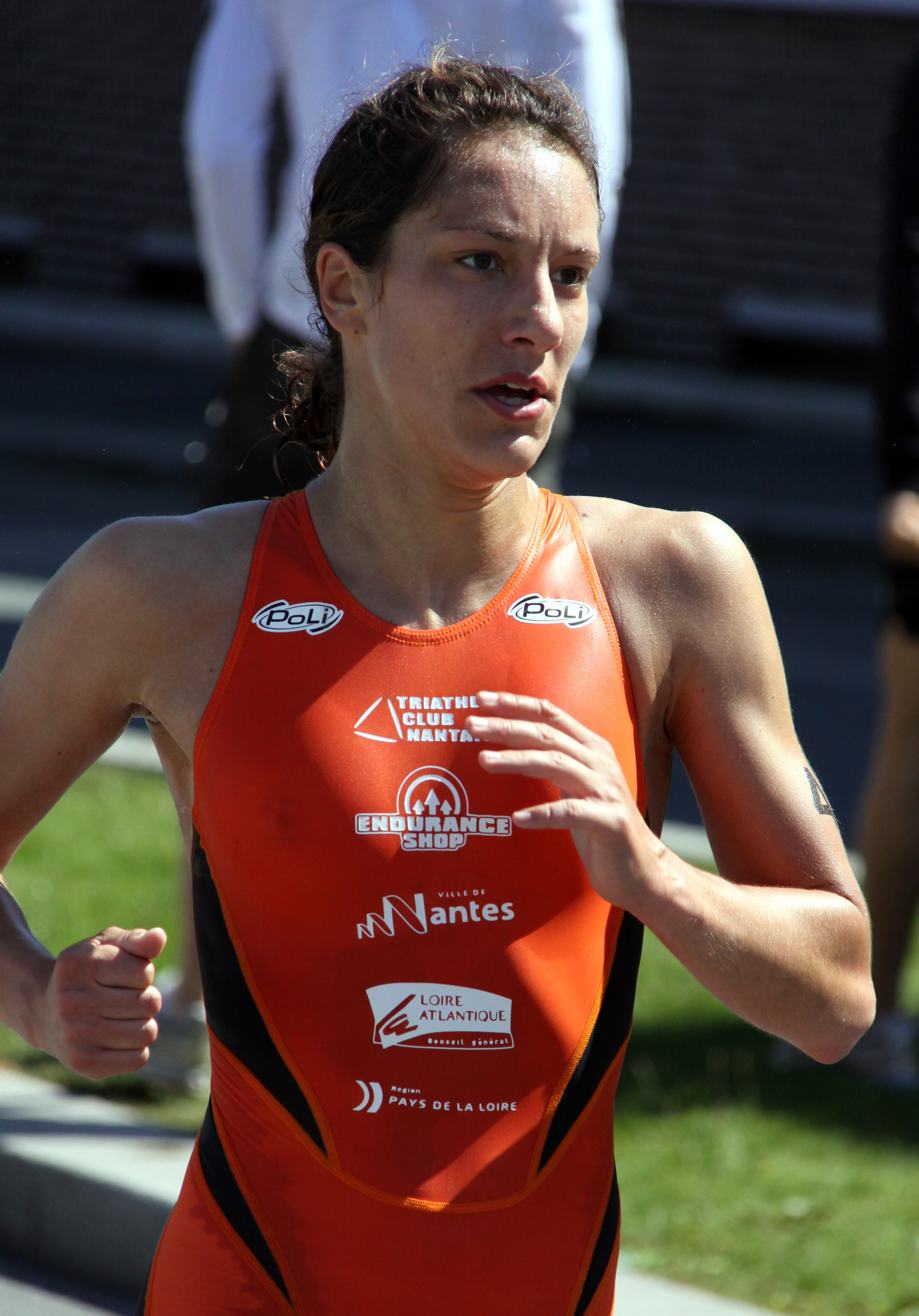
- Bonin at the Triathlon de Dunkerque, 2010

Personal information
- Born: 10 February 1987 (age 38); Aosta, Italy

Sport
- Country: Italy
- Sport: Triathlon
- Club: Fiamme Azzurre

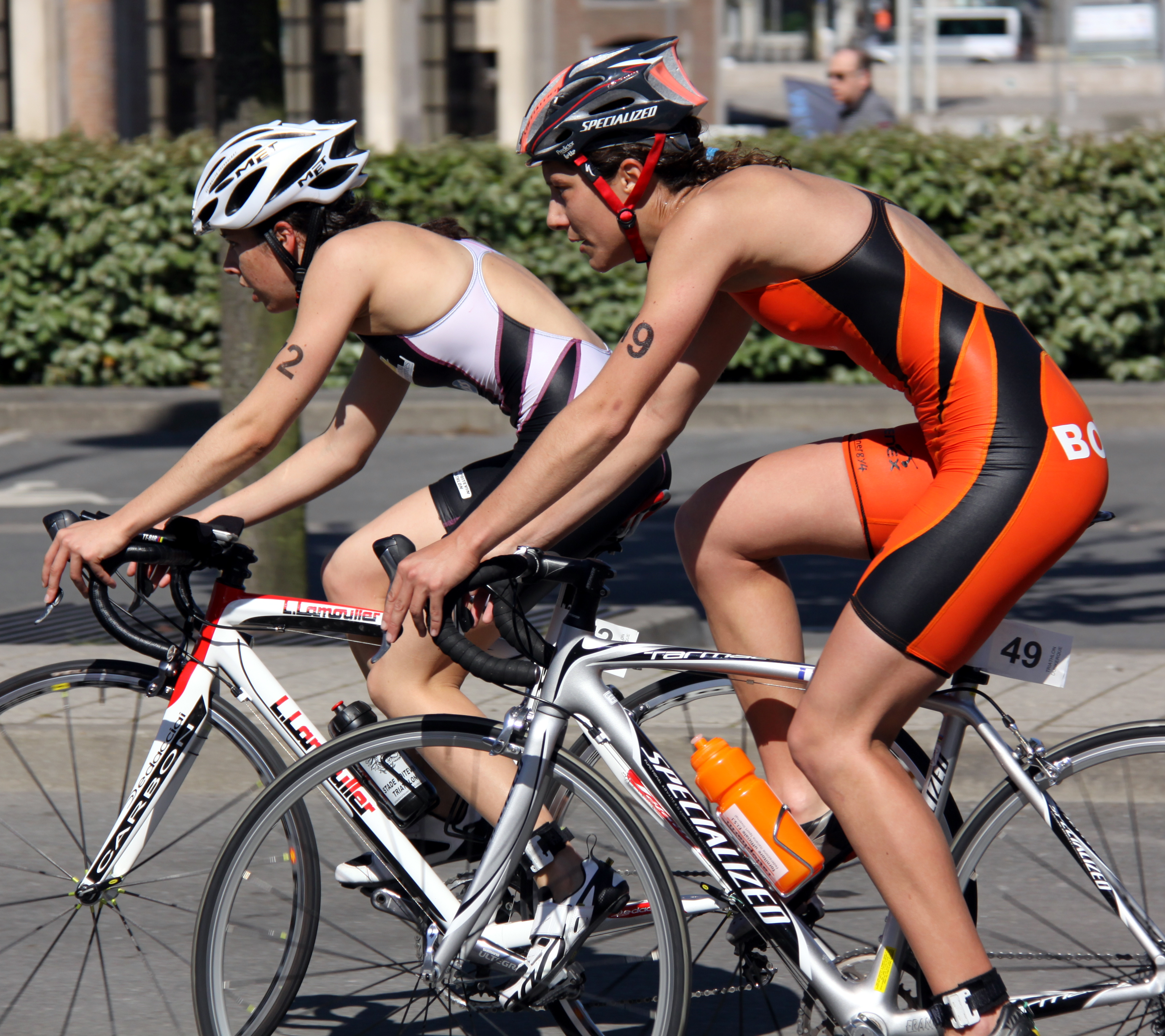
Bonin chasing Jessica Leroux at the Triathlon de Dunkerque, 2010

Charlotte Bonin (French: [ʃaʁlɔt bɔnɛ̃]; born 10 February 1987 in Aosta) is an Italian professional triathlete.

== Career ==
Charlotte Bonin was the national duathlon champion of the year 2006, the national triathlon silver medalist of the years 2007 and 2010, and the triathlon gold medalist of the year 2008. In Italy, Charlotte Bonin represents the Gruppo Sportivo Fiamme Gialle.

In 2010, Bonin also represented the elite team of Tri Club Nantais in the prestigious Club Championship Series Lyonnaise des Eaux. At Dunkirk on 23 May 2010, Bonin placed 33rd and was among the three best runners of her club, the triathlètes classants l'equipe; actually, none of the four elite triathletes of Tri Club Nantais was French: Anna Maria Mazzetti placed 7th, Maria Pujol Perez 21st, Charlotte Bonin 33rd and Scarlet Vatlach 42nd. At her second and last Lyonnaise triathlon of this season in Beauvais (13 June 2010) Bonin placed 17th and thus proved to be the best of her club. At Beauvais (13 June 2010) Bonin placed 17th and was the best of her club, Margie Santimaria was the second best of Tri Club Nantais.

In 2011, Charlotte Bonin will also represent the elite club EJOT in the German Bundesliga circuit.

== ITU Competitions ==
In the eight years from 2003 to 2010 Bonin took part in 44 ITU competitions and achieved 14 top ten positions. At the first race of the season 2011 in La Paz Bonin could win the gold medal. The following list is based upon the official ITU rankings and the Athlete's Profile Page. Unless indicated otherwise, all events are triathlons (Olympic Distance) and belong to the Elite category.

Date	Competition	Place	Rank
2003-06-21	European Championships (Junior)	Carlsbad	19
2004-05-05	Aquathlon World Championships	Madeira	3
2004-05-09	World Championships (Junior)	Madeira	7
2004-07-03	European Championships (Junior)	Lausanne	3
2005-07-23	European Championships (Junior)	Alexandroupoli(s)	2
2005-07-24	European Championships (Junior Women Relay)	Alexandroupoli(s)	2
2005-09-08	Aquathlon World Championships	Gamagori	5
2005-09-10	World Championships (Junior)	Gamagori	12
2006-05-21	Premium European Cup	Sanremo	5
2006-06-23	European Championships (Junior)	Autun	6
2006-07-08	European Championships (U23)	Rijeka	9
2006-07-30	BG World Cup	Salford	32
2006-09-02	World Championships (Junior)	Lausanne	6
2006-09-09	BG World Cup	Hamburg	43
2006-09-24	BG World Cup	Beijing	41
2006-10-07	European Duathlon Championships (Junior)	Rimini	DNS
2006-11-05	BG World Cup	Cancun	28
2006-11-12	BG World Cup	New Plymouth	32
2007-03-25	BG World Cup	Mooloolaba	37
2007-05-06	BG World Cup	Lisbon	35
2007-05-13	BG World Cup	Richards Bay	12
2007-06-10	BG World Cup	Vancouver	16
2007-06-24	BG World Cup	Edmonton	20
2007-06-29	European Championships	Copenhagen	23
2007-07-22	BG World Cup	Kitzbühel	34
2007-08-11	BG World Cup	Tiszaújváros	32
2007-08-30	BG World Championships	Hamburg	49
2007-09-15	BG World Cup	Beijing	27
2007-10-07	BG World Cup	Rhodes	31
2007-12-01	BG World Cup	Eilat	22
2008-04-13	BG World Cup	Ishigaki	25
2008-04-26	BG World Cup	Tongyeong	14
2008-05-04	BG World Cup	Richards Bay	24
2008-05-25	BG World Cup	Madrid	33
2008-06-05	BG World Championships	Vancouver	37
2008-08-18	Olympic Games	Beijing	44
2010-04-11	European Cup	Quarteira	12
2010-04-25	World Cup	Ishigaki	11
2010-05-30	10th World University Championship	Valencia	14
2010-06-05	Dextro Energy World Championship Series	Madrid	50
2010-08-15	European Cup	Geneva	4
2010-08-21	Sprint World Championships	Lausanne	32
2010-08-28	European Championships (U23)	Vila Nova de Gaia (Porto)	4
2010-08-29	European Championships: Team Relay (U23)	Vila Nova de Gaia (Porto)	2
2010-09-08	Dextro Energy World Championship Series, Grand Final: U23 World Championships	Budapest	10
2011-01-16	Pan American Cup	La Paz	1

BG = the sponsor British Gas · DNF = did not finish · DNS = did not start
