= 2018 in triathlon =

This article consists of the ITU and Ironman Triathlon events for 2018.

== 2018 ITU World Triathlon Series ==
- March 2: WTS #1 in (United Arab Emirates) Abu Dhabi
  - Elite winners: (South Africa) Henri Schoeman (m) / (Netherlands) Rachel Klamer (f)
- April 28: WTS #2 in (Bermuda) Hamilton
  - Elite winners: (Norway) Casper Stornes (m) / (Bermuda) Flora Duffy (f)
- May 12: WTS #3 in (Japan) Yokohama
  - Elite winners: (Spain) Mario Mola (m) / (Bermuda) Flora Duffy (f)
- June 10: WTS #4 in (United Kingdom) Leeds
  - Elite winners: (South Africa) Richard Murray (m) / (United Kingdom) Vicky Holland (f)
- July 14: WTS #5 in (Germany) Hamburg
  - Elite winners: (Spain) Mario Mola (m) / (France) Cassandre Beaugrand (f)
- July 27 – 29: WTS #6 in (Canada) Edmonton
  - Elite winners: (Spain) Mario Mola (m) / (United Kingdom) Vicky Holland (f)
- August 25 & 26: WTS #7 in (Canada) Montreal
  - Elite winners: (Spain) Mario Mola (m) / (United Kingdom) Vicky Holland (f)
- September 12 – 16: WTS Grand Final (#8) in (Australia) Gold Coast, Queensland
  - Elite winners: (France) Vincent Luis (m) / (Australia) Ashleigh Gentle (f)
  - Junior winners: (Hungary) Csongor Lehmann (m) / (Mexico) Cecilia Sayuri Ramirez Alavez (f)
  - U23 winners: (New Zealand) Tayler Reid (m) / (United States) Taylor Knibb (f)

== World triathlon championships ==
- January 26 – 28: 2018 Cheile Gradistei ITU Winter Triathlon World Championships in Romania
  - Elite winners: (Russia) Pavel Andreev (m) / (Russia) Yulia Surikova (f)
  - Junior winners: (Russia) Kirill Drozdov (m) / (Russia) Alexandra Levkovich (f)
  - U23 winners: (Norway) Eirik Bruland (m) / (Russia) Nadezhda Belkina (f)
  - 4x Mixed Relay winners: Russia (Daria Rogozina, Pavel Yakimov, Yulia Surikova, & Pavel Andreev)
  - Junior 4x Mixed Relay winners: Russia
- July 6 – 14: 2018 ITU Multisport World Championships in (Denmark) Fyn
  - Duathlon
  - Elite winners: (Denmark) Andreas Schilling (m) / (Austria) Sandrina Illes (f)
  - Junior winners: (United Kingdom) Matthew Willis (m) / (Italy) Costanza Arpinelli (f)
  - U23 winners: (Belgium) Dely Arnaud (m) / (France) Lucie Picard (f)
  - Cross triathlon
  - Elite winners: (Spain) Rubén Ruzafa (m) / (United Kingdom) Lesley Paterson (f)
  - Junior winners: (Canada) Tate Haugan (m) / (Czech Republic) Pavlina Vargova (f)
  - U23 winners: (Italy) Marcello Ugazio (m) / (Australia) Penny Slater (f)
  - Aquathlon
  - Elite winners: (Belgium) Emmanuel Lejeune (m) / (Iceland) Edda Hannesdottir (f)
  - Junior winners: (Denmark) Valdemar Solok (m) / (Denmark) Augusta Grønberg Christensen (f)
  - U23 winners: (Australia) Nathan Breen (m) / (Ukraine) Sofiya Pryyma (f)
  - Long Distance
  - Elite winners: (Spain) Pablo Dapena Gonzalez (m) / (Denmark) Helle Frederiksen (f)
- July 15: 2018 Hamburg ITU Triathlon Mixed Relay World Championships in Germany
  - Mixed Relay winners: France (Leonie Periault, Dorian Coninx, Cassandre Beaugrand, & Vincent Luis)
- July 28: 2018 Edmonton ITU Triathlon Mixed Relay World Series in Canada
  - Mixed Relay winners: Australia (Ashleigh Gentle, Aaron Royle, Natalie Van Coevorden, & Jacob Birtwhistle)
- August 31 – September 2: 2018 Kalmar FISU World University Triathlon Championship in Sweden
  - Elite winners: (Germany) Lars Pfeifer (m) / (France) Jeanne Lehair (f)
  - Mixed Relay winners: France (Jeanne Lehair, Nathan Grayel, Mathilde Gautier, & Nathan Guerbeur)
- September 1 & 2: 2018 Zofingen ITU Powerman Long Distance Duathlon World Championships in Switzerland
  - Elite winners: (France) Gaël Le Bellec (m) / (Switzerland) Petra Eggenschwiler (f)

== Regional triathlon championships ==
- February 18: 2018 Bridgetown CAMTRI Sprint Triathlon American Cup and Central American and Caribbean Championship in Barbados
  - Elite winners: (Canada) John Rasmussen (m) / (United States) Sophie Chase (f)
- February 24: 2018 Havana CAMTRI Middle Distance Triathlon Iberoamerican Championships in Cuba
  - Elite winners: (Cuba) Michel Gonzalez Castro (m) / (Croatia) Zeljka Milicic (f)
- March 3 & 4: 2018 Playa Hermosa CAMTRI Triathlon Youth and Junior Central American and Caribbean Championships in Costa Rica
  - Junior winners: (Venezuela) Sergio Quevedo Bermudez (m) / (Costa Rica) Vanessa Espinoza Umaña (f)
  - Youth winners: (Guatemala) Joshua Vincent Stewart Mendez (m) / (Guatemala) Yoana Griselda Tohom (f)
- March 10 & 11: 2018 Sarasota-Bradenton CAMTRI Sprint Triathlon American Cup and North American Championships in the United States
  - Elite winners: (United States) Eli Hemming (m) / (United States) Sophie Chase (f)
  - Junior winners: (United States) Andrew Shellenberger (m) / (Mexico) Cecilia Sayuri Ramirez Alavez (f)
  - U23 winners: (United States) Eli Hemming (m) / (United States) Erika Ackerlund (f)
- March 10 & 11: 2018 Montevideo CAMTRI Sprint Triathlon American Cup and South American Championships in Uruguay
  - Elite winners: (Argentina) Luciano Taccone (m) / (Argentina) Romina Biagioli (f)
  - Junior winners: (Brazil) Miguel Hidalgo (m) / (Brazil) Gabrielle Lemes (f)
  - U23 winners: (Chile) Diego Moya (m) / (Argentina) Maria Inti Guzman (f)
  - Youth winners: (Uruguay) Bruno Perillo (m) / (Uruguay) Julieta la Cruz (f)
  - 4 x Junior Mixed Relay winners: Chile (Marcela Alvarez Saez, Cristobal Baeza, Daniela Moya, & Roberto Porras)
- March 30: 2018 Sharm El Sheikh ATU Sprint Triathlon African Cup and Pan Arab Triathlon Championships in Egypt
  - Elite winners: (Hungary) Bence Bicsák (m) / (Ukraine) Yuliya Yelistratova (f)
  - Junior winners: (Palestine) Omar Abushabab (m) / (Jordan) Mariam Shaban (f)
  - Youth winners: (Egypt) Siefeldin Ismail (m) / (Egypt) Maram Elshafie (f)
  - U23 winners: (Hungary) Bence Bicsák (m) / (Hungary) Noémi Sárszegi (f)
- April 28: 2018 Pokhara NTT ASTC Triathlon South Asian Championships in Nepal
  - Elite winners: (India) Minachandra Singh (m) / (Spain) Isora Sosa (f)
- June 17: 2018 Subic Bay ASTC Triathlon Southeast Championships in Philippines
  - Elite winners: (Philippines) John Chicano (m) / (Philippines) Kim Kilgroe (f)
- July 7: 2018 Cholpon-Ata ASTC Sprint Triathlon Asian Cup and Central Asian Championships in Kyrgyzstan
  - Elite winners: (Canada) Michael Lori (m) / (Authorised Neutral Athletes) Arina Shulgina (f; Russia)
- August 3 & 4: 2018 Kupiškis ETU Triathlon Baltic Championships in Lithuania
  - Elite winners: (Belarus) Mikita Bely (m) / (Belarus) Hanna Maksimava (f)
- August 18: 2018 Sokcho ASTC Sprint Triathlon Asian Cup and East Asian Championships in South Korea
  - Elite winners: (Japan) Yuichi Hosoda (m) / (Authorised Neutral Athletes) Arina Shulgina (f; Russia)
- September 1: 2018 Fredericia ETU Triathlon Nordic Championships in Denmark
  - Elite winners: (Denmark) Andreas Schilling (m) / (Denmark) Alberte Kjær Pedersen (f)
- September 15 & 16: 2018 Ohrid ETU Triathlon Balkan Championships in Macedonia
  - Elite winners: (Serbia) Ognjen Stojanović (m) / (Serbia) Vida Medic (f)
  - Junior winners: (Croatia) Luka Grgorinic (m) / (Slovenia) Tjasa Vrtacic (f)
- October 26 & 27: 2018 Aqaba ASTC Sprint Triathlon Asian Cup and West Asian Championships in Jordan
  - Elite winners: (Canada) Michael Lori (m) / (Hungary) Zsanett Bragmayer (f)
- November 11: 2018 Santo Domingo CAMTRI Sprint Triathlon American Cup and Iberoamerican Championships in Dominican Republic
  - Elite winners: (United States) William Huffman (m) / (Ecuador) Elizabeth Bravo (f)
- November 23: 2018 Luxor ATU Duathlon African Championships and Pan Arab Duathlon Championships in Egypt
  - Elite winners: (Bahrain) Moussa Karich (m) / (Egypt) Basmla Elsalamoney (f)
  - Junior winners: (Tunisia) Mohamed Aziz Sebai (m) / (Tunisia) Syrine Fattoum (f)
  - U23 winners: (Egypt) Mohanad Elshafei (m) / (Egypt) Basmla Elsalamoney (f; default)
  - Youth winners: (Tunisia) Yassine Bradai (m) / (Egypt) Haidy Taymour (f)
- December 1: 2018 OTU Triathlon Pacific Islands Championships in Samoa
  - Elite winners: (French Polynesia) Benjamin Zorgnotti (m) / (French Polynesia) Leilanie Guerry-Wong Foo (f)

== 2018 ITU Triathlon World Cup ==
- February 11: TWC #1 in (South Africa) Cape Town
  - Elite winners: (South Africa) Richard Murray (m) / (United Kingdom) Vicky Holland (f)
- March 10: TWC #2 in (Australia) Mooloolaba
  - Elite winners: (South Africa) Richard Murray (m) / (Australia) Emma Jeffcoat (f)
- March 25: TWC #3 in (New Zealand) New Plymouth
  - Elite winners: (Australia) Declan Wilson (m) / (United States) Kirsten Kasper (f)
- April 14 & 15: TWC #4 in (United States) New Orleans
  - Event cancelled, due to potential event-standard fears.
- May 5 & 6: TWC #5 in (China) Chengdu
  - Elite winners: (Azerbaijan) Rostyslav Pevtsov (m) / (Australia) Emma Jeffcoat (f)
- May 19: TWC #6 in (Kazakhstan) Astana
  - Elite winners: (Russia) Dmitry Polyanski (m) / (France) Sandra Dodet (f)
- June 2: TWC #7 in (Italy) Cagliari
  - Elite winners: (Italy) Delian Stateff (m) / (Austria) Lisa Perterer (f)
- June 10: TWC #8 in (Mexico) Huatulco
  - Elite winners: (Mexico) Rodrigo González (m) / (United States) Chelsea Sodaro (f)
- June 17: TWC #9 in (Belgium) Antwerp
  - Elite winners: (Belgium) Jelle Geens (m) / (United States) Summer Cook (f)
- July 7 & 8: TWC #10 in (Hungary) Tiszaújváros
  - Note: Due to hail and thunderstorms, the men's event was cancelled.
  - Women's Elite winner: (United Kingdom) Sophie Coldwell
- August 18: TWC #11 in (Switzerland) Lausanne
  - Elite winners: (Norway) Gustav Iden (m) / (Switzerland) Nicola Spirig (f)
- September 1 & 2: TWC #12 in (Czech Republic) Karlovy Vary
  - Elite winners: (Russia) Dmitry Polyanski (m) / (Czech Republic) Vendula Frintová (f)
- September 22: TWC #13 in (China) Weihai
  - Elite winners: (Norway) Gustav Iden (m) / (United States) Taylor Spivey (f)
- September 29 & 30: TWC #14 in (Spain) Madrid
  - Event cancelled, due to water quality fears.
- October 13: TWC #15 in (United States) Sarasota-Bradenton
  - Elite winners: (France) Vincent Luis (m) / (United States) Renee Tomlin (f)
- October 21: TWC #16 in (Ecuador) Salinas
  - Elite winners: (Spain) David Castro Fajardo (m) / (Ukraine) Yuliya Yelistratova (f)
- October 27: TWC #17 in (South Korea) Tongyeong
  - Elite winners: (Switzerland) Max Studer (m) / (Japan) Ai Ueda (f)
- November 10: TWC #18 (final) in (Japan) Miyazaki
  - Elite winners: (Spain) Vicente Hernández (m) / (United States) Summer Cook (f)

== European Triathlon Union (ETU) ==
- February 17: 2018 Piano Vetore–Etna ETU Winter Triathlon European Championships in Italy
  - Elite winners: (Russia) Pavel Andreev (m) / (Russia) Yulia Surikova (f)
  - Junior winners: (Italy) Alberto Rabellino (m; default) / (Russia) Polina Tarakanova (f; default)
  - U23 winners: (Italy) Alessandro Saravalle (m) / (Russia) Nadezhda Belkina (f)
- May 6: 2018 Vejle ETU Powerman Middle Distance Duathlon European Championships in Denmark
  - Elite winners: (Denmark) Søren Bystrup (m) / (Austria) Sandrina Illes (f)
- July 19 – 22: 2018 Tartu ETU Triathlon European Championships in Estonia
  - Elite winners: (Slovakia) Richard Varga (m) / (United Kingdom) Sophie Coldwell (f)
  - Junior winners: (Norway) Vetle Bergsvik Thorn (m) / (France) Pauline Landron (f)
- August 9 – 11: 2018 Glasgow ETU Triathlon European Championships in Great Britain
  - Elite winners: (France) Pierre Le Corre (m) / (Switzerland) Nicola Spirig (f)
  - Mixed Relay winners: France (Leonie Periault, Pierre Le Corre, Cassandre Beaugrand, & Dorian Coninx)
- August 30 – September 2: 2018 Loutraki ETU Triathlon Youth European Championships Festival in Greece
  - Youth winners: (United Kingdom) Connor Bentley (m) / (United Kingdom) Libby Coleman (f)
  - Mixed Youth Relay winners: Great Britain (Libby Coleman, Fynn Batkin, Freya Thomson, & Connor Bentley)
- September 23: 2018 Madrid ETU Challenge Long Distance Triathlon European Championships in Spain
  - Elite winners: (Belgium) Timothy Van Houtem (m) / (United Kingdom) Laura Siddall (f)
- October 6: 2018 Lisbon ETU Triathlon Mixed Relay Clubs European Championships in Portugal
  - Mixed Relay winners: France (Leonie Periault, Anthony Pujades, Cassandre Beaugrand, & Aurelien Raphael)
  - Junior Mixed Relay winners: France (Marine Vetillard & Axel Hamon)
- October 19 – 21: 2018 Eilat ETU Triathlon U23 European Championships in Israel
  - U23 winners: (Switzerland) Max Studer (m) / (Switzerland) Julie Derron (f)
- October 20 – 28: 2018 Ibiza ETU Multisport European Championships in Spain
  - Duathlon
    - Elite winners: (France) Yohan le Berre (m) / (France) Sandra Levenez (f)
    - Junior winners: (Spain) Romaric Forques (m) / (Belgium) Laura Swannet (f)
    - U23 winners: (Belgium) Arnaud Dely (m) / (Spain) Irene Loizate Sarrionandia (f)
  - Middle Distance Triathlon
    - Elite winners: (Italy) Giulio Molinari (m) / (Belgium) Alexandra Tondeur (f)
  - Cross Duathlon
    - Elite winners: (Belgium) Tim van Hemel (m) / (Slovakia) Kristina Lapinova (f)
    - Men's Junior winner: (Spain) Nicolas Puertas Fernandez
    - U23 winners: (Russia) Evgenii Evgrafov (m) / (Russia) Daria Rogozina (f)
  - Cross Triathlon
    - Elite winners: (Belgium) Tim van Hemel (m) / (United Kingdom) Nicole Walters (f)
    - Junior winners: (Spain) Nicolas Puertas Fernandez (m) / (Italy) Marta Menditto (f)
    - U23 winners: (Italy) Marcello Ugazio (m) / (Ukraine) Sofiya Pryyma (f)
  - Aquathlon
    - Elite winners: (Ukraine) Sergiy Kurochkin (m) / (Italy) Bianca Seregni (f)
    - Junior winners: (Croatia) Luka Grgorinic (m) / (Italy) Bianca Seregni (f)
    - U23 winners: (United Kingdom) Samuel Dickinson (m) / (Romania) Antoanela Manac (f)

== Confederación Americana de Triathlon (CAMTRI) ==
- March 10: 2018 Sarasota-Bradenton CAMTRI Paratriathlon American Championships in the United States
  - Note: There was no PTS3 events here.
  - PTWC winners: (Brazil) Fernando Aranha (m) / (United States) Ahalya Lettenberger (f)
  - PTS2 winners: (United States) Mark Barr (m) / (United States) Hailey Danz (f)
  - PTS4 winners: (United States) Jamie Brown (m) / (United States) Andrea Walton (f; default)
  - PTS5 winners: (United States) Chris Hammer (m) / (United States) Grace Norman (f)
  - PTVI winners: (United States) Aaron Scheidies (m) / (Canada) Jessica Tuomela (f)
- June 23 & 24: 2018 Brasília CAMTRI Triathlon American Championships in Brazil
  - Elite winners: (Brazil) Manoel Messias (m) / (Brazil) Luisa Baptista (f)
  - U23 winners: (Brazil) Manoel Messias (m) / (Mexico) Vanesa de la Torre (f)
- August 19: 2018 Santiago CAMTRI Duathlon American Championships in Chile
  - Elite winners: (Chile) Diego Moya (m) / (Chile) Marcela Alvarez Saez (f)
- October 14: 2018 Sarasota-Bradenton CAMTRI Triathlon Mixed Relay American Championships in the United States
  - Mixed Relay winners: United States (Renee Tomlin, Jason West, Taylor Spivey, & Morgan Pearson)

== Oceania Triathlon Union (OTU) ==
- January 14: 2018 St. Kilda OTU Paratriathlon Oceania Championships in Australia
  - Note: There was no women's PTS2 & PTS3 events here.
  - PTWC winners: (Australia) Alex Welsh (m) / (Australia) Sara Tait (f)
  - Men's PTS2 winner: (Australia) Brant Garvey
  - Men's PTS3 winner: (Australia) Justin Godfrey (default)
  - PTS4 winners: (Australia) Clint Pickin (m) / (Australia) Sally Pilbeam (f)
  - PTS5 winners: (Australia) Joshua Kassulke (m) / (New Zealand) Sharon Dagg (f)
  - PTVI winners: (Australia) Gerrard Gosens (m) / (New Zealand) Shannon Cleave (f; default)
- February 4: 2018 Glenelg OTU Triathlon Mixed Relay Oceania Championships in Australia
  - 4x Mixed Relay winners: New Zealand (Nicole Van Der Kaay, Ryan Sissons, Andrea Hewitt, & Tayler Reid)
- February 17: 2018 Devonport OTU Sprint Triathlon Oceania Cup and OTU Sprint Triathlon Oceania Championships in Australia
  - Elite winners: (Australia) Brandon Copeland (m) / (Australia) Emma Jeffcoat (f)
  - U23 winners: (Australia) Brandon Copeland (m) / (Australia) Annabel White (f)
- March 25: 2018 New Plymouth OTU Triathlon Oceania YOG Qualifier and Junior Oceania Championships in New Zealand
  - Junior winners: (Australia) Lorcan Redmond (m) / (Canada) Desirae Ridenour (f)
  - Youth winners: (New Zealand) Dylan McCullough (m) / (Australia) Charlotte Derbyshire (f)
- April 8: 2018 St. Kilda OTU Triathlon Oceania Cup and OTU Triathlon Oceania Championships in Australia
  - Elite winners: (New Zealand) Sam Ward (m) / (Australia) Natalie Van Coevorden (f)
  - U23 winners: (Australia) Callum McClusky (m) / (New Zealand) Elise Salt (f)

== Asian Triathlon Confederation (ASTC) ==
- March 3 & 4: 2018 Putrajaya ASTC Powerman Middle Distance Duathlon Asian Championships in Malaysia
  - Elite winners: (Netherlands) Thomas Bruins (m) / (Hungary) Annamária Eberhardt-Halász (f)
- May 6: 2018 Hong Kong ASTC Triathlon Junior Asian Championships in Hong Kong
  - Junior winners: (Hong Kong) Oscar Coggins (m) / (Japan) Nanami Nakayama (f)
- May 12 & 13: 2018 Gunsan ASTC Long Distance Triathlon Asian Championships in South Korea
  - Elite winners: (Belarus) Aliaksandr Vasilevich (m) / (Belarus) Hanna Maksimava (f)
- June 24: 2018 Gamagōri ASTC Triathlon U23 Asian Championships in Japan
  - U23 winners: (Japan) Takumi Hojo (m) / (Japan) Niina Kishimoto (f)
- August 10: 2018 Mt Mayon (Legazpi) ASTC Paratriathlon Asian Championships in the Philippines
  - Note: There were no PTS3, Women's PTS4, & Women's PTS5 events here.
  - PTWC winners: (Japan) Jumpei Kimura (m) / (Japan) Wakako Tsuchida (f; default)
  - PTS2 winners: (Japan) Kenshiro Nakayama (m) / (Japan) Yukako Hata (f; default)
  - Men's PTS4 winner: (China) WANG Jiachao
  - Men's PTS5 winner: (Japan) Tetsuki Kaji
  - PTVI winners: (Hong Kong) CHU Kin Wa (m) / (Japan) Atsuko Maruo (f)
- October 20: 2018 Hong Kong ASTC Aquathlon Asian Championships in Hong Kong
  - Elite winners: (Hong Kong) KOK Yu Hang (m) / (Macau) HOI Long (f)
  - Junior winners: (Kazakhstan) Daryn Konysbayev (m) / (Hong Kong) LO Ho Yan (f)
  - U23 winners: (Hong Kong) KOK Yu Hang (m) / (Chinese Taipei) CHANG Chi-Wen (f; default)

== African Triathlon Union (ATU) ==
- April 21 & 22: 2018 Rabat ATU Triathlon African Championships and YOG Qualifier in Morocco
  - Elite winners: (Morocco) Badr Siwane (m) / (South Africa) Gillian Sanders (f)
  - Junior winners: (South Africa) Jamie Riddle (m) / (South Africa) Amber Schlebusch (f)
  - U23 winners: (Mauritius) Gregory Ernest (m) / (South Africa) Shanae Williams (f)
  - Men's Youth winner: (Zimbabwe) Steffens Luke

== 2018 ITU World Paratriathlon Series ==
- May 12 & 13: WPS #1 in (Japan) Yokohama
  - PTWC winners: (Netherlands) Jetze Plat (m) / (Japan) Wakako Tsuchida (f)
  - PTS2 winners: (United States) Mark Barr (m) / (United States) Allysa Seely (f)
  - PTS3 winners: (Australia) Justin Godfrey (m) / (France) Elise Marc (f; default)
  - PTS4 winners: (France) Alexis Hanquinquant (m) / (Japan) Mami Tani (f)
  - PTS5 winners: (United Kingdom) George Peasgood (m) / (United Kingdom) Lauren Steadman (f)
  - PTVI winners: (United Kingdom) Dave Ellis (m) / (Spain) Susana Rodriguez (f)
- June 30: WPS #2 in (Italy) Iseo-Franciacorta
  - PTWC winners: (Netherlands) Jetze Plat (m) / (Australia) Lauren Parker (f)
  - PTS2 winners: (United States) Mark Barr (m) / (United States) Allysa Seely (f)
  - PTS3 winners: (Spain) Daniel Molina (m) / (France) Elise Marc (f; default)
  - PTS4 winners: (Russia) Mikhail Kolmakov (m) / (Russia) Anna Plotnikova (f)
  - PTS5 winners: (United Kingdom) George Peasgood (m) / (United Kingdom) Lauren Steadman (f)
  - PTVI winners: (United Kingdom) Dave Ellis (m) / (United Kingdom) Alison Patrick (f)
- July 27 – 29: WPS #3 (final) in (Canada) Edmonton
  - Note: There were no PTS3 events here.
  - PTWC winners: (France) Alexandre Paviza (m) / (Japan) Wakako Tsuchida (f)
  - PTS2 winners: (United States) Mark Barr (m) / (United States) Allysa Seely (f)
  - PTS4 winners: (Austria) Oliver Dreier (m) / (Republic of Ireland) Cassie Cava (f; default)
  - PTS5 winners: (Canada) Stefan Daniel (m) / (United States) Grace Norman (f)
  - PTVI winners: (Australia) Jonathan Goerlach (m) / (United States) Elizabeth Baker (f)

== 2018 ITU Paratriathlon World Cup ==
- February 17: PWC #1 in (Australia) Devonport, Tasmania
  - Note: There was no women's PTS3 and PTS5 events here.
  - PTWC winners: (Australia) Bill Chaffey (m) / (Australia) Emily Tapp (f)
  - PTS2 winners: (Australia) Brant Garvey (m) / (Japan) Yukako Hata (f, default)
  - Men's PTS3 winner: (Australia) Justin Godfrey (default)
  - PTS4 winners: (Russia) Mikhail Kolmakov (m) / (Australia) Sally Pilbeam (f)
  - Men's PTS5 winner: (Australia) Joshua Kassulke
  - PTVI winners: (Australia) Jonathan Goerlach (m) / (Australia) Katie Kelly (f; default)
- April 14 & 15: PWC #2 in (United States) New Orleans
  - Event cancelled, due to potential event-standard fears.
- May 5 & 6: PWC #3 in (Spain) Águilas
  - Note: There was no women's PTS3 event here.
  - PTWC winners: (France) Ahmed Andaloussi (m) / (Spain) Eva María Moral Pedrero (f)
  - PTS2 winners: (Netherlands) Maurits Morsink (m) / (Spain) Rakel Mateo Uriarte (f; default)
  - Men's PTS3 winner: (Spain) Daniel Molina
  - PTS4 winners: (Spain) Alejandro Sánchez Palomero (m) / (Russia) Evgeniya Koroleva (f; default)
  - PTS5 winners: (Spain) Jairo Ruiz Lopez (m) / (Ukraine) Alisa Kolpakchy (f)
  - PTVI winners: (Spain) Héctor Catalá Laparra (m) / (Spain) Susana Rodriguez (f)
- May 28: PWC #4 in (United Kingdom) Eton Dorney
  - PTWC winners: (United Kingdom) Joseph Townsend (m) / (United Kingdom) Jade Jones (f)
  - PTS2 winners: (United Kingdom) Andrew Lewis (m) / (United States) Melissa Stockwell (f)
  - PTS3 winners: (United Kingdom) Ryan Taylor (m) / (Germany) Nora Hansel (f; default)
  - PTS4 winners: (United Kingdom) Steven Crowley (m) / (United Kingdom) Hannah Moore (f; default)
  - PTS5 winners: (Germany) Martin Schulz (m) / (United Kingdom) Lauren Steadman (f)
  - PTVI winners: (United Kingdom) Dave Ellis (m) / (United Kingdom) Alison Patrick (f)
- June 16 & 17: PWC #5 in (France) Besançon
  - PTWC winners: (France) Ahmed Andaloussi (m) / (Australia) Lauren Parker (f)
  - PTS2 winners: (Russia) Vasily Egorov (m) / (Netherlands) Saskia van den Ouden (f; default)
  - PTS3 winners: (Germany) Max Gelhaar (m) / (France) Elise Marc (f; default)
  - PTS4 winners: (Austria) Oliver Dreier (m) / (Russia) Anna Plotnikova (f; default)
  - PTS5 winners: (Germany) Martin Schulz (m) / (France) Gwladys Lemoussu (f)
  - PTVI winners: (Serbia) Lazar Filipovic (m) / (France) Annouck Curzillat (f)
- July 14: PWC #6 in (Canada) Magog, Quebec
  - Note: There was no PTS3 and no women's PTS4 events here.
  - PTWC winners: Antonio Daniel Muller (m) / (United States) Kendall Gretsch (f)
  - PTS2 winners: (Australia) Brant Garvey (m) / (Canada) Lyne-Marie Bilodeau (f; default)
  - Men's PTS4 winner: (China) WANG Jiachao
  - PTS5 winners: (Mexico) José Abraham Estrada Sierra (m) / (Canada) Kamylle Frenette (f; default)
  - PTVI winners: (Canada) Jon Dunkerley (m) / (Canada) Jessica Tuomela (f; default)
- August 18: PWC #7 in (Switzerland) Lausanne
  - PTWC winners: (France) Ahmed Andaloussi (m) / (France) Mona Francis (f; default)
  - PTS2 winners: (United Kingdom) Andrew Lewis (m) / (Finland) Liisa Lilja (f; default)
  - PTS3 winners: (South Africa) Charl Parkin (m; default) / (France) Elise Marc (f; default)
  - PTS4 winners: (France) Alexis Hanquinquant (m) / (Japan) Mami Tani (f)
  - PTS5 winners: (United Kingdom) George Peasgood (m) / (France) Emilie Gral (f)
  - PTVI winners: (France) Arnaud Grandjean (m) / (Australia) Katie Kelly (f)
- October 14: PWC #8 in (United States) Sarasota-Bradenton
  - Note: There was no women's PTS2, PTS3, and women's PTS5 events here.
  - PTWC winners: (Australia) Nic Beveridge (m) / (Brazil) Jessica Ferreira (f)
  - Men's PTS2 winner: (United States) Adam Popp
  - PTS4 winners: (Republic of Ireland) Andrew Nicholson (m) / (United States) Kelly Elmlinger (f)
  - Men's PTS5 winner: (Mexico) Juan Carlos Cano Espinoza
  - PTVI winners: (Japan) Yuichi Takahashi (m) / (United States) Elizabeth Baker (f)
- October 27 & 28: PWC #9 (final) in (Portugal) Funchal
  - Note: There was no women's PTS3 event here.
  - PTWC winners: (United Kingdom) Mark Conway (m) / (Germany) Christiane Reppe (f)
  - PTS2 winners: (United Kingdom) Stuart Meikle (m) / (Finland) Liisa Lilja (f)
  - Men's PTS3 winner: (Portugal) José Mendonça (default)
  - PTS4 winners: (China) WANG Jiachao (m) / (United Kingdom) Megan Richter (f; default)
  - PTS5 winners: (Germany) Martin Schulz (m) / (Ukraine) Alisa Kolpakchy (f)
  - PTVI winners: (Ukraine) Anatolii Varfolomieiev (m) / (United States) Amy Dixon (f)

== World Triathlon Corporation ==
Main Ironman Championships

- April 15: 2018 Standard Bank Ironman African Championship in (South Africa) Nelson Mandela Bay Metropolitan Municipality
  - Winners: (South Africa) Kyle Buckingham (m) / (United Kingdom) Lucy Charles (f)
- April 28: 2018 Memorial Hermann Ironman North American Championship in (United States) The Woodlands, Texas
  - Winners: (United States) Matt Hanson (m) / (Australia) Melissa Hauschildt (f)
- June 10: 2018 Cairns Airport Ironman Asia-Pacific Championship in (Australia) Cairns
  - Winners: (New Zealand) Braden Currie (m) / (New Zealand) Teresa Adam (f)
- July 8: 2018 Mainova Ironman European Championship in (Germany) Frankfurt
  - Winners: (Germany) Jan Frodeno (m) / (Switzerland) Daniela Ryf (f)
- October 13: 2018 Ironman World Championship in (United States) Kailua, Hawaii County, Hawaii
  - Winners: (Germany) Patrick Lange (m) / (Switzerland) Daniela Ryf (f)
- December 2: 2018 Ironman South American Championship in (Argentina) Mar del Plata
  - Winners: (Austria) Michael Weiss (m) / (Australia) Sarah Crowley (f)

Main Ironman 70.3 Championships

- June 17: 2018 KMD Ironman 70.3 European Championship in (Denmark) Elsinore
  - Winners: (United States) Rodolphe von Berg (m) / (Australia) Melissa Hauschildt (f)
- September 1 & 2: 2018 Ironman 70.3 World Championship in (South Africa) Nelson Mandela Bay Metropolitan Municipality
  - Winners: (Germany) Jan Frodeno (m) / (Switzerland) Daniela Ryf (f)
- November 4: 2018 Ironman 70.3 South American Championship in (Argentina) Buenos Aires
  - Winners: (United States) Rodolphe von Berg (m) / (Brazil) Pâmella Oliveira (f)
- November 25: 2018 Ironman 70.3 Western Sydney (Asia-Pacific) Championship in Australia
  - Winners: (New Zealand) Terenzo Bozzone (m) / (Czech Republic) Radka Kahlefeldt (f)
- December 8: 2018 Ironman 70.3 Middle East Championship in (Bahrain) Manama
  - Winners: (Norway) Kristian Blummenfelt (m) / (United Kingdom) Holly Lawrence (f)
