= 2019 in triathlon =

This article consists of the ITU and Ironman Triathlon events for 2019.

== 2020 Summer Olympics ==
- August 15 – 18: 2019 Tokyo ITU World Olympic Qualification Event
  - Elite winners: (Canada) Tyler Mislawchuk (m) / (Bermuda) Flora Duffy (f)

== 2019 ITU World Triathlon Series ==
- March 8 & 9: WTS #1 in (United Arab Emirates) Abu Dhabi
  - Elite winners: (Spain) Mario Mola (m) / (United States) Katie Zaferes (f)
- April 27: WTS #2 in Bermuda
  - Elite winners: (France) Dorian Coninx (m) / (United States) Katie Zaferes (f)
- May 18 & 19: WTS #3 in (Japan) Yokohama
  - Elite winners: (France) Vincent Luis (m) / (United States) Katie Zaferes (f)
- June 8 & 9: WTS #4 in (United Kingdom) Leeds
  - Elite winners: (Australia) Jacob Birtwhistle (m) / (United Kingdom) Georgia Taylor-Brown (f)
- June 28 & 29: WTS #5 in (Canada) Montreal
  - Elite winners: (Belgium) Jelle Geens (m) / (United States) Katie Zaferes (f)
- July 6 & 7: WTS #6 in (Germany) Hamburg
  - Elite winners: (Australia) Jacob Birtwhistle (m) / (United Kingdom) Non Stanford (f)
- July 20 & 21: WTS #7 in (Canada) Edmonton
  - Elite winners: (United Kingdom) Jonny Brownlee (m) / (Australia) Emma Jackson (f)
- August 29 – September 1: WTS Grand Final (#8) in (Switzerland) Lausanne
  - Elite winners: (Norway) Kristian Blummenfelt (m) / (United States) Katie Zaferes (f)
  - Junior winners: (Portugal) Ricardo Batista (m) / (Italy) Beatrice Mallozzi (f)
  - U23 winners: (Spain) Roberto Sanchez Mantecon (m) / (France) Emilie Morier (f)

== World triathlon championships & cup ==
- February 9 & 10: 2019 Asiago ITU Winter Triathlon World Championships in Italy
  - Elite winners: (Russia) Pavel Andreev (m) / (Russia) Daria Rogozina (f)
  - Junior winners: (Italy) Simone Avondetto (m) / (Italy) Giorgia Rigoni (f)
  - U23 winners: (Italy) Franco Pesavento (m) / (Russia) Daria Rogozina (f)
  - 2x2 Mixed Relay winners: Russia (Daria Rogozina & Pavel Andreev)
  - Junior 2x2 Mixed Relay winners: Italy (Giorgia Rigoni & Simone Avondetto)
- April 27 – May 4: 2019 Pontevedra ITU Multisport World Championships in Spain
  - Duathlon
    - Elite winners: (France) Benjamin Choquert (m) / (France) Sandra Levenez (f)
    - Junior winners: (Spain) Sergio Baxter Cabrera (m) / (Switzerland) Delia Sclabas (f)
    - U23 winners: (Belgium) Arnaud Mengal (m) / (Venezuela) Edymar Daniely Brea Abreu (f)
  - Cross triathlon
    - Elite winners: (France) Arthur Forissier (m) / (Italy) Eleonora Peroncini (f)
    - Junior winners: (Denmark) Oscar Gladney Rundqvist (m) / (Netherlands) Willemijn Fuite (f)
    - U23 winners: (France) Maxim Chane (m) / (Switzerland) Loanne Duvoisin (f)
  - Aquathlon
    - Elite winners: (Azerbaijan) Rostyslav Pevtsov (m) / (Poland) Alicja Ulatowska (f)
    - Junior winners: (Spain) Esteban Basanta Fouz (m) / (Italy) Bianca Seregni (f)
    - U23 winners: (Spain) Ander Noain Lacamara (m) / (Poland) Alicja Ulatowska (f)
  - Long Distance
    - Elite winners: (Spain) Javier Gómez Noya (m) / (Belgium) Alexandra Tondeur (f)
- July 7: 2019 Hamburg ITU Triathlon Mixed Relay World Championships in Germany
  - Mixed Relay winners: France (Emilie Morier, Léo Bergere, Cassandre Beaugrand, & Vincent Luis)
- September 7 & 8: 2019 Wenzhou ITU Multisport World Cup in China
  - Long Distance
    - Elite winners: (Slovenia) Jaroslav Kovacic (m) / (Poland) Ewa Bugdol (f)
  - Duathlon
    - Elite winners: (New Zealand) Trent Dodds (m) / (China) TANG Zhilin (f)
- September 8: 2019 Zofingen ITU Powerman Long Distance Duathlon World Championships in Switzerland
  - Elite winners: (Belgium) Diego van Looy (m) / (Switzerland) Nina Zoller (f)

== Regional triathlon championships ==
- February 23: 2019 Havana CAMTRI Middle Distance Triathlon Iberoamerican Championships in Cuba
  - Men's Elite winner: (Cuba) Michel Gonzalez Castro
- March 1 – 3: 2019 Playa Hermosa CAMTRI Sprint Triathlon American Cup and Central American & Caribbean Championships in Costa Rica
  - Elite winners: (Colombia) Carlos Javier Quinchara Forero (m) / (Colombia) Lina Maria Raga (f)
  - Junior winners: (Costa Rica) Alvaro Campos Solano (m) / (Cuba) Daniela Ciara Vega (f)
  - Youth winners: (Costa Rica) Sebastian Morales Arce (m) / (Puerto Rico) Adriana López (f)
- March 24: 2019 Huelva ETU Triathlon European Cup and Iberoamerican Championships in Spain
  - Elite winners: (United Kingdom) Barclay Izzard (m) / (France) Pauline Landron (f)
- March 30: 2019 Sharm El Sheikh ATU Sprint Triathlon African Cup and Pan Arab Championships in Egypt
  - Elite winners: (Russia) Ilya Prasolov (m) / (Germany) Bianca Bogen (f)
  - U23 winners: (Egypt) Mohanad Elshafei (m) / (Egypt) Basmla Elsalamoney (f)
  - Youth winners: (Egypt) Abdelrahman Sherif (m) / (Egypt) Maram Yasser Mohamed (f)
  - Mixed Relay winners: Egypt (Rehab Hamdy, Mohamed Tarek, Basmla Elsalamoney, & Mohanad Elshafei)
- March 30 & 31: 2019 Montevideo CAMTRI Sprint Triathlon American Cup and South American Championships in Uruguay
  - Elite winners: (Brazil) Diogo Sclebin (m) / (Argentina) Romina Biagioli (f)
  - Junior winners: (Brazil) Miguel Hidalgo (m) / (Brazil) Giovanna Lacerda (f)
  - U23 winners: (Chile) Diego Moya (m) / (Ecuador) Paula Jara (f)
  - Youth winners: (Ecuador) Matias Sebastian Bravo Delgado (m) / (Ecuador) Josselin Michell Yuqui Peralta (f)
- April 27: 2019 Pokhara NTT ASTC Sprint Triathlon Asian Cup and South Asian Championships in Nepal
  - Elite winners: (Japan) Makoto Odakura (m) / (South Korea) Park Ye-jin (f)
- May 11: 2019 Sines ETU Sprint Triathlon European Cup and Mediterranean Championships in Portugal
  - Elite winners: (Spain) Genis Grau (m) / (France) Emmie Charayron (f)
- June 29 & 30: 2019 Cholpon-Ata ASTC Sprint Triathlon Asian Cup and Central Asian Championships in Kyrgyzstan
  - Elite winners: (Serbia) Ognjen Stojanović (m) / (Ukraine) Kseniia Levkovska (f)
- July 13: 2019 Tartu ETU Triathlon European Cup and Baltic Championships in Estonia
  - Elite winners: (United Kingdom) Samuel Dickinson (m) / (Germany) Annika Koch (f)
- August 3 & 4: 2019 Istanbul ETU Triathlon Balkan Championships in Turkey
  - Elite winners: (Turkey) Gültigin Er (m) / (Croatia) Zeljka Milicic (f)
- September 22: 2019 Osaka Castle ASTC Sprint Triathlon Asian Cup and East Asian Championships in Japan
  - Elite winners: (Japan) Takumi Hojo (m) / (Australia) Sophie Linn (f)
- October 11: 2019 Luxor ATU Sprint Duathlon African Championships & Pan Arab Championships in Egypt
  - Elite winners: (Tunisia) Mohamed Aziz Sebai (m) / (Egypt) Basmla Elsalamoney (f)
  - Junior winners: (Tunisia) Mohamed Aziz Sebai (m) / (Egypt) Haidy Taymour (f)
  - Youth winners: (Egypt) Khaled Sayed Ghraib Altaib (m) / (Egypt) Nour Hamed (f)
  - U23 winners: (Egypt) Siefeldin Ismail (m) / (Egypt) Basmla Elsalamoney (f)

== 2019 ITU Triathlon World Cup ==
- February 9 & 10: TWC #1 in (South Africa) Cape Town
  - Elite winners: (United Kingdom) Alex Yee (m) / (Japan) Ai Ueda (f)
- March 16: TWC #2 in (Australia) Mooloolaba
  - Elite winners: (Canada) Tyler Mislawchuk (m) / (Australia) Ashleigh Gentle (f)
- March 31: TWC #3 in (New Zealand) New Plymouth
  - Elite winners: (Australia) Luke Willian (m) / (Italy) Angelica Olmo (f)
- May 4 & 5: TWC #4 in (Spain) Madrid
  - Elite winners: (Germany) Justus Nieschlag (m) / (France) Emilie Morier (f)
- May 11 & 12: TWC #5 in (China) Chengdu
  - Elite winners: (Australia) Matthew Hauser (m) / (Germany) Laura Lindemann (f)
- May 18: TWC #6 in (Italy) Cagliari
  - Elite winners: (United Kingdom) Alistair Brownlee (m) / (United Kingdom) Sophie Coldwell (f)
- June 8 & 9: TWC #7 in (Mexico) Huatulco
  - Elite winners: (Canada) Tyler Mislawchuk (m) / (United States) Summer Rappaport (f)
- June 15 & 16: TWC #8 in (Kazakhstan) Nur-Sultan
  - Elite winners: (Australia) Matthew Hauser (m) / (Japan) Ai Ueda (f)
- June 23: TWC #9 in (Belgium) Antwerp
  - Elite winners: (New Zealand) Tayler Reid (m) / (Germany) Lisa Tertsch (f)
- July 13 & 14: TWC #10 in (Hungary) Tiszaújváros
  - Elite winners: (United States) Eli Hemming (m) / (Australia) Emma Jeffcoat (f)
- August 25: TWC #11 in (Czech Republic) Karlovy Vary
  - Elite winners: (United Kingdom) Samuel Dickinson (m) / (Czech Republic) Vendula Frintová (f)
- September 7: TWC #12 in (Spain) Banyoles
  - Elite winners: (France) Vincent Luis (m) / (Germany) Laura Lindemann (f)
- September 21 & 22: TWC #13 in (China) Weihai
  - Elite winners: (Portugal) João Pedro Silva (m) / (Switzerland) Julie Derron (f)
- October 19: TWC #14 in (South Korea) Tongyeong
  - Elite winners: (United States) Matthew McElroy (m) / (France) Sandra Dodet (f)
- October 26: TWC #15 in (Japan) Miyazaki
  - Elite winners: (United States) Matthew McElroy (m) / (Japan) Ai Ueda (f)
- November 3: TWC #16 in (Peru) Lima
  - Elite winners: (Brazil) Manoel Messias (m) / (Japan) Ai Ueda (f)
- November 9 & 10: TWC #17 (final) in (Dominican Republic) Santo Domingo
  - Elite winners: (United States) Matthew McElroy (m) / (New Zealand) Andrea Hewitt (f)

== 2019 ITU World Triathlon Mixed Relay Series ==
- March 9: 2019 ITU World Triathlon Mixed Relay Series Abu Dhabi in United Arab Emirates
  - Winners: Australia (Ashleigh Gentle, Luke Willian, Emma Jeffcoat, & Jacob Birtwhistle)
- June 15: 2019 ITU World Triathlon Mixed Relay Series Nottingham in Great Britain
  - Winners: Great Britain (Georgia Taylor-Brown, Ben Dijkstra, Sophie Coldwell, & Alex Yee)
- July 20 & 21: 2019 ITU World Triathlon Mixed Relay Series Edmonton in Canada
  - Winners: New Zealand (Ainsley Thorpe, Tayler Reid, Nicole van der Kaay, & Hayden Wilde)
- August 18: 2019 ITU World Triathlon Mixed Relay Series Tokyo in Japan
  - Winners: France (Cassandre Beaugrand, Pierre Le Corre, Leonie Periault, & Dorian Coninx)

== European Triathlon Union (ETU) ==
- February 23 & 24: 2019 Cheile Grădiştei ETU Winter Triathlon European Championships in Romania
  - Elite winners: (Russia) Dmitriy Bregeda (m) / (Russia) Daria Rogozina (f)
  - Junior winners: (Italy) Simone Avondetto (m) / (Slovakia) Zuzana Michalickova (f)
  - U23 winners: (Italy) Alessandro Saravalle (m) / (Russia) Daria Rogozina (f)
  - 2x2 Mixed Relay winners: Russia (Svetlana Sokolova & Pavel Andreev)
- May 11: 2019 Viborg ETU Powerman Middle Distance Duathlon European Championships in Denmark
  - Elite winners: (Netherlands) Daan de Groot (m) / (Switzerland) Petra Eggenschwiler (f)
- May 31 – June 2: 2019 Weert ETU Triathlon European Championships in the Netherlands
  - Elite winners: (United Kingdom) Alistair Brownlee (m) / (United Kingdom) Beth Potter (f)
  - Junior winners: (France) Paul Georgenthum (m) / (Italy) Beatrice Mallozzi (f)
- June 20 – 23: 2019 Kitzbühel ETU Triathlon Youth European Championships Festival in Austria
  - Youth winners: (Spain) Igor Bellido Mikhailova (m) / (Russia) Anna Goreva (f)
  - Youth Mixed Relay winners: Spain (Elsa Pena Vicente, Esteban Basanta Fouz, Nerea Garcia Busto, & Igor Bellido Mikhailova)
- June 28 – July 7: 2019 Târgu Mureș ETU Multisport European Championships in Romania
  - Aquathlon
    - Elite winners: (Serbia) Ognjen Stojanović (m) / (Italy) Bianca Seregni (f)
    - Junior winners: (Ukraine) Vitalii Vorontsov (m) / (Italy) Bianca Seregni (f)
    - U23 winners: (France) Alexis Kardes (m) / (Ukraine) Valentyna Molchanets (f)
  - Cross Duathlon
    - Elite winners: (France) Arthur Serrieres (m) / (France) Morgane Riou (f)
    - Junior winners: (France) Corentin Lefer (m) / (Slovakia) Zuzana Michalickova (f)
    - U23 winners: (Italy) Tommaso Gatti (m) / (Russia) Daria Rogozina (f)
  - Cross triathlon
    - Elite winners: (Spain) Rubén Ruzafa (m) / (France) Morgane Riou (f)
    - Junior winners: (Netherlands) Lucas Goene (m) / (Slovakia) Zuzana Michalickova (f)
    - U23 winners: (Italy) Tommaso Gatti (m) / (Italy) Marta Menditto (f)
  - Duathlon
    - Elite winners: (France) Benjamin Choquert (m) / (Spain) Irene Loizate Sarrionandia (f)
    - Junior winners: (Ukraine) Vitalii Vorontsov (m) / (Slovakia) Liza Hazuchova (f)
    - U23 winners: (France) Krilan le Bihan (m) / (Spain) Marta Pintanel Raymundo (f)
  - Middle Distance Triathlon
    - Elite winners: (Russia) Andrey Bryukhankov (m) / (United Kingdom) Katrina Rye (f)
- July 26 – 28: 2019 Kazan ETU Sprint Triathlon European Championships in Russia
  - Elite winners: (United Kingdom) Gordon Benson (m) / (Switzerland) Julie Derron (f)
- September 12 – 14: 2019 Almere-Amsterdam ETU Challenge Long Distance Triathlon European Championships in the Netherlands
  - Elite winners: (South Africa) Matt Trautman (m) / (Netherlands) Yvonne van Vlerken (f)
- September 14 & 15: 2019 Valencia ETU Paratriathlon & U23 European Championships in Spain
  - Paratriathlon
    - PTWC winners: (Italy) Giovanni Achenza (m) / (Germany) Christiane Reppe (f)
    - PTS2 winners: (France) Jules Ribstein (m) / (United Kingdom) Fran Brown (f)
    - PTS3 winners: (Spain) Daniel Molina (m) / (France) Elise Marc (f)
    - PTS4 winners: (France) Alexis Hanquinquant (m) / (Germany) Elke van Engelen (f)
    - PTS5 winners: (Germany) Martin Schulz (m) / (United Kingdom) Lauren Steadman (f)
    - PTVI winners: (Spain) Jose Luis García Serrano (m) / (Spain) Susana Rodriguez (f)
  - U23
    - U23 winners: (United Kingdom) Ben Dijkstra (m) / (Germany) Lisa Tertsch (f)
- October 5 & 6: 2019 Alhandra ETU Triathlon Mixed Relay Clubs European Championships in Portugal
  - Mixed Relay winners: France (Cassandre Beaugrand, Anthony Pujades, Leonie Periault, & Dorian Coninx)
  - Junior Mixed Relay winners: Portugal (Inês Rico, Francois Vie, Gabriela Ribeiro, & Afonso Nunes)

== Confederación Americana de Triathlon (CAMTRI) ==
- March 9 & 10: 2019 Sarasota CAMTRI Paratriathlon American Championships in United States
  - PTWC winners: (United States) Joshua Sweeney (m) / (United States) Kendall Gretsch (f)
  - PTS2 winners: (United States) Mark Barr (m) / (United States) Hailey Danz (f)
  - PTS4 winners: (United States) Eric McElvenny (m) / (United States) Kelly Elmlinger (f)
  - PTS5 winners: (Canada) Stefan Daniel (m) / (United States) Grace Norman (f)
  - PTVI winners: (United States) Aaron Scheidies (m) / (United States) Elizabeth Baker (f)
- May 3 – 5: 2019 Monterrey CAMTRI Triathlon American Championships in Mexico
  - Elite winners: (Mexico) Irving Pérez (m) / (Ecuador) Elizabeth Bravo (f)
  - Junior winners: (Canada) Brock Hoel (m) / (Mexico) Anahi Alvarez Corral (f)
  - U23 winners: (Brazil) Manoel Messias (m) / (United States) Erika Ackerlund (f)
  - Mixed Relay winners: Brazil
- June 2: 2019 Santa Marta CAMTRI Aquathlon American Championships in Colombia
  - Elite winners: (Mexico) Ivan Eduardo Castro Garcia (m) / (Colombia) Maira Alejandra Vargas (f)
  - Junior winners: (Colombia) Jeisson Leonardo Fierro Calderon (m) / (Peru) Naomi Espinoza Guablocho (f)
  - U23 winners: (Colombia) Eduardo Londoño Naranjo (m) / (Mexico) Itzel Arroyo Aquino (f)

== Oceania Triathlon Union (OTU) ==
- February 24: 2019 Newcastle OTU Paratriathlon Oceania Championships in Australia
  - Note: There were no PTS2 and PTS3 events here.
  - PTWC winners: (Australia) Nic Beveridge (m; default) / (Australia) Lauren Parker (f)
  - PTS4 winners: (Australia) Clint Pickin (m) / (Australia) Sally Pilbeam (f)
  - PTS5 winners: (Australia) Joshua Kassulke (m; default) / (Australia) Kate Doughty (f)
  - PTVI winners: (Australia) Jonathan Goerlach (m) / (Australia) Katie Kelly (f)
- March 2 & 3: 2019 Devonport OTU Sprint Triathlon Oceania Cup and Sprint Triathlon Oceania Championships in Australia
  - Elite winners: (New Zealand) Tayler Reid (m) / (Australia) Joanne Miller (f)
  - Junior winners: (New Zealand) Dylan Mccullough (m) / (New Zealand) Hannah Knighton (f)
  - U23 winners: (New Zealand) Tayler Reid (m) / (Australia) Joanne Miller (f)
  - Mixed Relay winners: New Zealand (Nicole van der Kaay, Tayler Reid, Ainsley Thorpe, & Hayden Wilde)
- April 14: 2019 Moreton Bay OTU Triathlon Oceania Cup and Triathlon Oceania Championships in Australia
  - Elite winners: (Australia) Brandon Copeland (m) / (Australia) Kelly-Ann Perkins (f)
  - U23 winners: (Australia) Brandon Copeland (m) / (Australia) Brittany Dutton (f)

== Asian Triathlon Confederation (ASTC) ==
- March 2 & 3: 2019 Putrajaya ASTC Powerman Middle Distance Duathlon Asian Championships in Malaysia
  - Elite winners: (France) Antony Costes (m) / (Hungary) Annamária Eberhardt-Halász (f)
- June 20 – 23: 2019 Gyeongju ASTC Triathlon Asian Championships in South Korea
  - Elite winners: (Hong Kong) Oscar Coggins (m) / (Japan) Ai Ueda (f)
  - Junior winners: (Japan) Mitsuho Mochizuki (m) / (Japan) Chisato Nakajima (f)
  - U23 winners: (Kazakhstan) Daryn Konysbayev (m) / (China) WEI Wen (f)
  - Mixed Relay winners: Japan (Yuka Sato, Takumi Hojo, Juri Ide, & Kenji Nener)

== African Triathlon Union (ATU) ==
- June 1 & 2: 2019 Shandrani ATU Triathlon African Championships in Mauritius
  - Elite winners: (South Africa) Wian Sullwald (m) / (South Africa) Gillian Sanders (f)
  - Junior winners: (South Africa) Jamie Riddle (m) / (South Africa) Amber Schlebusch (f)
  - U23 winners: (South Africa) Ben de la Porte (m) / (Tunisia) Ons Lajili (f)
  - Youth winners: (Egypt) Abdelrahman Sherif (m) / (Mauritius) Laetitia D`Autriche (f)
- June 29 & 30: 2019 Cape Town ATU Duathlon African Championships in South Africa
  - Elite winners: (South Africa) Herculaas Cronje (m) / (South Africa) Carlyn Fischer (f)
  - U23 winners: (South Africa) Herculaas Cronje (m) / (South Africa) Cristina Heywood (f; default)

== 2019 ITU World Paratriathlon Series ==
- April 27: WPS #1 in (Italy) Milan
  - PTWC winners: (Netherlands) Jetze Plat (m) / (Spain) Eva María Moral Pedrero (f)
  - PTS2 winners: (France) Jules Ribstein (m) / (United States) Allysa Seely (f)
  - PTS3 winners: (Russia) Victor Chebotarev (m) / (Russia) Anna Plotnikova (f; default)
  - PTS4 winners: (France) Alexis Hanquinquant (m) / (United Kingdom) Hannah Moore (f)
  - PTS5 winners: (Germany) Martin Schulz (m) / (Australia) Kate Doughty (f)
  - PTVI winners: (Spain) Héctor Catalá Laparra (m) / (United Kingdom) Alison Peasgood (f)
- May 18 & 19: WPS #2 in (Japan) Yokohama
  - PTWC winners: (Netherlands) Geert Schipper (m) / (United Kingdom) Jade Hall (f)
  - PTS2 winners: (France) Stéphane Bahier (m) / (United States) Allysa Seely (f)
  - PTS3 winners: (Netherlands) Nico van der Burgt (m) / (Russia) Anna Plotnikova (f; default)
  - PTS4 winners: (France) Alexis Hanquinquant (m) / (United States) Kelly Elmlinger (f)
  - PTS5 winners: (Canada) Stefan Daniel (m) / (United States) Grace Norman (f)
  - PTVI winners: (Spain) Jose Luis García Serrano (m) / (Spain) Susana Rodriguez (f)
- June 28: WPS #3 (final) in (Canada) Montreal
  - PTWC winners: (Netherlands) Jetze Plat (m) / (Australia) Emily Tapp (f)
  - PTS2 winners: (France) Jules Ribstein (m) / (United States) Allysa Seely (f)
  - PTS3 winners: (Spain) Daniel Molina (m) / (Russia) Anna Plotnikova (f; default)
  - PTS4 winners: (France) Alexis Hanquinquant (m) / (United Kingdom) Hannah Moore (f)
  - PTS5 winners: (Canada) Stefan Daniel (m) / (United Kingdom) Claire Cashmore (f)
  - PTVI winners: (United Kingdom) Dave Ellis (m) / (Spain) Susana Rodriguez (f)

== 2019 ITU Paratriathlon World Cup ==
- March 2 & 3: PWC #1 in (Australia) Devonport, Tasmania
  - Note: There were no PTS3 events here.
  - PTWC winners: (Australia) Nic Beveridge (m) / (Australia) Lauren Parker (f)
  - PTS2 winners: (Japan) Kenshiro Nakayama (m; default) / (Japan) Yukako Hata (f; default)
  - PTS4 winners: (Austria) Oliver Dreier (m) / (Australia) Sally Pilbeam (f)
  - PTS5 winners: (Australia) David Bryant (m) / (Australia) Kate Doughty (f)
  - PTVI winners: (France) Arnaud Grandjean (m) / (Australia) Katie Kelly (f)
- June 15 & 16: PWC #2 in (France) Besançon
  - Note: There was no women's PTS3 event here.
  - PTWC winners: (France) Alexandre Paviza (m) / (United States) Kendall Gretsch (f)
  - PTS2 winners: (United Kingdom) Andrew Lewis (m) / (Finland) Liisa Lilja (f)
  - Men's PTS3 winner: (Netherlands) Nico van der Burgt
  - PTS4 winners: (Russia) Mikhail Kolmakov (m) / (Germany) Elke van Engelen (f)
  - PTS5 winners: (Germany) Martin Schulz (m) / (Ukraine) Alisa Kolpakchy (f)
  - PTVI winners: (France) Antoine Perel (m) / (United Kingdom) Melissa Reid (f)
- July 13 & 14: PWC #3 in (Canada) Magog, Quebec
  - Note: There were no PTS3 events here.
  - PTWC winners: (Italy) Giovanni Achenza (m) / (Germany) Christiane Reppe (f)
  - PTS2 winners: (Netherlands) Maurits Morsink (m) / (United States) Melissa Stockwell (f)
  - PTS4 winners: (China) WANG Jiachao (m) / (Germany) Elke van Engelen (f; default)
  - PTS5 winners: (United States) Chris Hammer (m) / (Canada) Kamylle Frenette (f)
  - PTVI winners: (France) Antoine Perel (m) / (United Kingdom) Melissa Reid (f)
- August 17: PWC #4 in (Japan) Tokyo
  - Note: There was no women's PTS3 event here.
  - PTWC winners: (United Kingdom) Joseph Townsend (m) / (Japan) Wakako Tsuchida (f)
  - PTS2 winners: (United States) Mark Barr (m) / (United States) Hailey Danz (f)
  - Men's PTS3 winner: (South Korea) KIM Hwang-tae
  - PTS4 winners: (Russia) Mikhail Kolmakov (m) / (United States) Kelly Elmlinger (f)
  - PTS5 winners: (Canada) Stefan Daniel (m) / (United Kingdom) Lauren Steadman (f)
  - PTVI winners: (United Kingdom) Dave Ellis (m) / (Canada) Jessica Tuomela (f)
- September 8: PWC #5 in (Spain) Banyoles
  - Note: There was no women's PTS3 event here.
  - PTWC winners: (France) Alexandre Paviza (m) / (Australia) Lauren Parker (f)
  - PTS2 winners: (Russia) Vasilii Egorov (m) / (United States) Melissa Stockwell (f)
  - Men's PTS3 winner: (Spain) Daniel Molina
  - PTS4 winners: (Spain) Alejandro Sánchez Palomero (m) / (Japan) Mami Tani (f)
  - PTS5 winners: (Spain) Jairo Ruiz Lopez (m) / (Australia) Kate Doughty (f)
  - PTVI winners: (Spain) Héctor Catalá Laparra (m) / (Italy) Anna Barbaro (f)
- October 5 & 6: PWC #6 in (Turkey) Alanya
  - PTWC winners: (Austria) Florian Brungraber (m) / (Netherlands) Margret Ijdema (f)
  - PTS2 winners: (Russia) Mikhail Astashov (m) / (Japan) Yukako Hata (f)
  - PTS3 winners: (Russia) Victor Chebotarev (m) / (France) Elise Marc (f)
  - PTS4 winners: (Russia) Mikhail Kolmakov (m) / (United States) Kelly Elmlinger (f)
  - PTS5 winners: (France) Yannick Bourseaux (m) / (Ukraine) Alisa Kolpakchy (f)
  - PTVI winners: (France) Arnaud Grandjean (m) / (Italy) Anna Barbaro (f)
- October 19 & 20: PWC #7 (final) in (Portugal) Funchal
  - Note: There was no women's PTS3 event here.
  - PTWC winners: (Austria) Florian Brungraber (m) / (Spain) Eva María Moral Pedrero (f)
  - PTS2 winners: (United Kingdom) Andrew Lewis (m) / (United States) Melissa Stockwell (f)
  - Men's PTS3 winner: (Spain) Daniel Molina
  - PTS4 winners: (Russia) Mikhail Kolmakov (m) / (United States) Kelly Elmlinger (f)
  - PTS5 winners: (Brazil) Carlos Rafael Viana (m) / (France) Gwladys Lemoussu (f)
  - PTVI winners: (United Kingdom) Dave Ellis (m) / (France) Annouck Curzillat (f)

== World Triathlon Corporation ==
Main Ironman Championships

- April 7: 2019 Standard Bank Ironman African Championship in (South Africa) Nelson Mandela Bay Metropolitan Municipality
  - Winners: (United States) Ben Hoffman (m) / (United Kingdom) Lucy Charles (f)
- April 27: 2019 Memorial Hermann Ironman North American Championship in (United States) The Woodlands, Texas
  - Winners: (Sweden) Patrik Nilsson (m) / (Switzerland) Daniela Ryf (f)
- June 9: 2019 Cairns Airport Ironman Asia-Pacific Championship in (Australia) Cairns
  - Winners: (New Zealand) Braden Currie (m) / (New Zealand) Teresa Adam (f)
- June 30: 2019 Mainova Ironman European Championship in (Germany) Frankfurt
  - Winners: (Germany) Jan Frodeno (m) / (United States) Skye Moench (f)
- October 12: 2019 Ironman World Championship in (United States) Kailua, Hawaii County, Hawaii
  - Winners: (Germany) Jan Frodeno (m) / (Germany) Anne Haug (f)
- December 1: 2019 Ironman South American Championship in (Argentina) Mar del Plata

Main Ironman 70.3 Championships

- May 12: 2019 Techcombank Ironman 70.3 Asia-Pacific Championship in (Vietnam) Da Nang
  - Winners: (Germany) Patrick Lange (m) / (United Kingdom) Holly Lawrence (f)
- June 23: 2019 KMD Ironman 70.3 European Championship in (Denmark) Elsinore
  - Winners: (United States) Rodolophe von Berg (m) / (United Kingdom) Holly Lawrence (f)
- September 7 & 8: 2019 Ironman 70.3 World Championship in (France) Nice
  - Winners: (Norway) Gustav Iden (m) / (Switzerland) Daniela Ryf (f)
- November 3: 2019 Ironman 70.3 South American Championship in (Argentina) Buenos Aires
  - Winners: (United States) Rodolophe von Berg (m) / (United States) Chelsea Sodaro (f)
- December 7: 2019 Ironman 70.3 Middle East Championship in (Bahrain) Manama
