= Lauren Steadman =

British Paralympic athlete (born 1992)

Lauren Steadman MBE
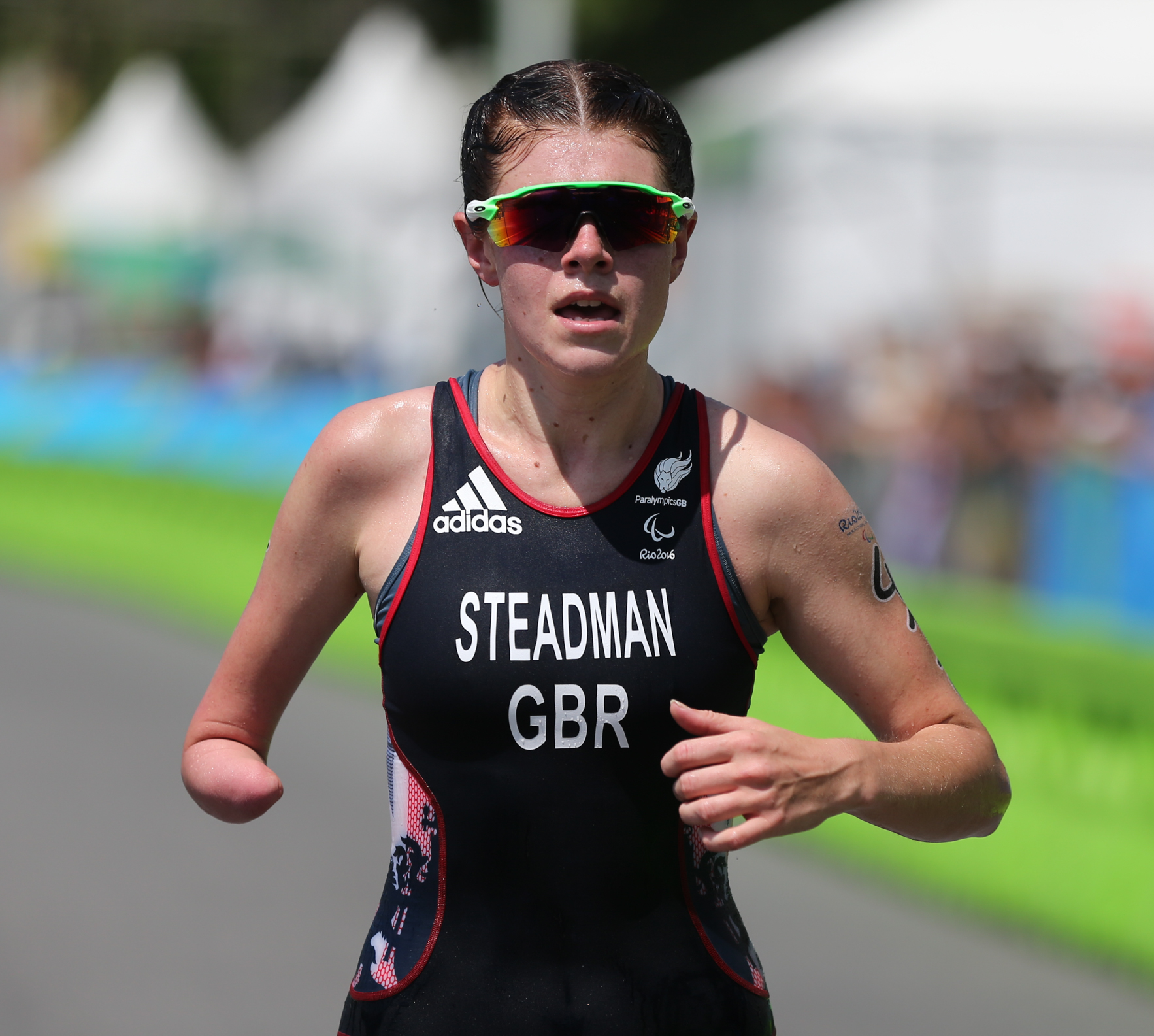
- Steadman in 2016

Personal information
- Nationality: British
- Born: 18 December 1992 (age 33) Peterborough, England
- Height: 167 cm (5 ft 6 in)

Sport
- Sport: Para swimming Paratriathlon
- Club: Portsmouth Northsea; Portsmouth Athletics Club
Medal record
Representing Great Britain
Women's para swimming
World Championships (SC)
Gold medal – first place	2009 Rio	4 × 100 m freestyle 34pts
European Championships
Bronze medal – third place	2011 Berlin	4 × 100 m freestyle 34pts
Bronze medal – third place	2009 Reykjavik	400 m freestyle SB9
Women's para triathlon
Paralympic Games
Gold medal – first place	2020 Tokyo	PTS5
Silver medal – second place	2016 Rio de Janeiro	PT4
Bronze medal – third place	2024 Paris	PTS5
World Championships
Gold medal – first place	2014 Edmonton	PT4
Gold medal – first place	2015 Chicago	PT4
Gold medal – first place	2018 Gold Coast	PTS5
Silver medal – second place	2013 London	TRI 4
Silver medal – second place	2017 Rotterdam	PTS5
Silver medal – second place	2019 Lausanne	PTS5
Bronze medal – third place	2023 Ponteverde	PTS5
Bronze medal – third place	2024 Torremolinos	PTS5
Bronze medal – third place	2025 Wollongong	PTS5
Bronze medal – third place	2026 Pontevedra	PTS5
European Championships
Gold medal – first place	2013 Alanya	TRI 4
Gold medal – first place	2014 Kitzbühel	PT4
Gold medal – first place	2015 Geneva	PT4
Gold medal – first place	2016 Lisbon	PT4
Gold medal – first place	2017 Kitzbühel	PTS5
Gold medal – first place	2018 Tartu	PTS5
Gold medal – first place	2019 Valencia	PTS5
Gold medal – first place	2024 Vichy	PTS5
Women's para-aquathlon
World Championships
Silver medal – second place	2012 Auckland	TRI 4

Lauren Steadman (born 18 December 1992) is a British Paralympic athlete who has competed in four Summer Paralympics, in both swimming and the paratriathlon. She competed at both the 2008 Summer Paralympics in Beijing and the 2012 Summer Paralympics in London as a swimmer, before switching to the paratriathlon for the 2016 Games in Rio where she won a silver medal in the Women's PT4. She won the gold medal in the Women's PTS5 at the 2020 Games in Tokyo.

== Life and career ==
Steadman was born in Peterborough in 1992. She has won medals in 2009 and in 2011 at the IPC European Championships. Her uncle was a triathlete and he suggested she try it. Steadman was educated at Great Gidding Primary School, then Sawtry community College for a couple of years and then privately at the independent Mount Kelly school in Tavistock, Devon, and completed a BSc (Hons) Psychology degree, followed by a master's degree in Business and Management at the University of Portsmouth.

On 20 August 2018 it was announced that Steadman would be a contestant on series 16 of Strictly Come Dancing, partnered with AJ Pritchard. They made it to the semi-final but were eliminated by Ashley Roberts and Pasha Kovalev in the dance-off. Steadman went on to perform in the live version of the show. Also, she competed and was one of two finalists in series 2 of Celebrity SAS: Who Dares Wins. In January 2023, Steadman was a panelist on Richard Osman's House of Games. In August 2026, Steadman competed in and won Celebrity MasterChef.

== Paratriathlon career ==
In 2013 and 2014 Steadman won medals at the European Championships Paratriathlon. In 2014, she won the London World Series Paratriathlon, gained a degree in Psychology and became the World Champion Paratriathlete in Edmonton, Canada.

Paratriathlon became an Olympic sport at the 2016 Summer Paralympics in Rio de Janeiro. Steadman took the Silver medal behind Grace Norman of the US.

Competing in the Women's PTS5 classification at the 2020 Summer Paralympics in Tokyo, Steadman overtook Grace Norman early in the cycling leg and maintained her lead through the run to take the gold medal by 41 seconds.

Steadman was appointed Member of the Order of the British Empire (MBE) in the 2022 New Year Honours for services to triathlon.

She competed at the 2024 Summer Paralympics, winning the bronze medal in the Women's PTS5 triathlon behind Grace Norman and compatriot Claire Cashmore.
