= Triathlon at the 2024 Summer Paralympics – Women's PTS5 =

Women's PTS5 at the XVII Paralympic Games
- Venue: Pont Alexandre III
- Dates: 2 September 2024
- Competitors: 10 from 8 nations

Medalists
1st place, gold medalist(s)		Grace Norman	United States
2nd place, silver medalist(s)		Claire Cashmore	Great Britain
3rd place, bronze medalist(s)		Lauren Steadman	Great Britain

The Triathlon at the 2024 Summer Paralympics – Women's PTS5 event at the 2024 Paralympic Games took place at 12:35 CET on 2 September 2024 at Pont Alexandre III, Paris. 10 athletes representing 8 nations competed.

== Venue ==
The triathlon course startede from Pont Alexandre III bridge near Seine River and ended at the same place. The event was held over sprint distance. There was a 750 metre Swim through the Seine; a 20 km para cycling at Champs-Élysées, Avenue Montaigne, crossing the Seine by the Pont des Invalides and reaching the Quai d'Orsay; and the last leg of 5 km run ended at Pont Alexandre III bridge.

== Results ==
World Triathlon confirmed the final entry list for the event in August 2024.

All three medalists from 2021 returned, and all three turned out to be a class above all their rivals, creating separation between themselves and the pack in the swim leg. However, in 2024 the American Grace Norman, bronze medallist behind a Great Britain one-two in 2021, put both the Brits behind here, coming on strongly in the run leg to claim gold ahead of Claire Cashmore. Tokyo champion Lauren Steadman settled for bronze.

Rank	Name	Nationality	Swim	T1	Bike	T2	Run	Total Time	Notes
1st place, gold medalist(s)	Grace Norman	United States	11:32	1:15	32:50	0:47	18:16	1:04:40	
2nd place, silver medalist(s)	Claire Cashmore	Great Britain	11:33	1:03	33:10	0:37	19:32	1:05:55	
3rd place, bronze medalist(s)	Lauren Steadman	Great Britain	11:47	1:05	32:47	0:41	20:25	1:06:55	
4	Kamylle Frenette	Canada	12:13	0:59	36:28	0:33	19:37	1:09:50	
5	Andrea Miguelez Ranz	Spain	13:04	1:09	35:39	0:44	21:44	1:12:20	
6	Gwladys Lemoussu	France	14:29	1:07	37:06	0:38	20:43	1:14:03	
7	Marta Dzieciątkowska	Poland	13:10	0:58	37:42	0:32	22:10	1:14:42	
8	Alisa Kolpakchy	Ukraine	17:41	1:17	37:04	0:45	20:12	1:16:59	
9	Monika Belczewska	Poland	17:34	0:58	36:20	0:45	21:40	1:17:17	
10	Laura-Liis Juursalu	Estonia	22:42	1:07	38:38	0:39	24:06	1:27:12	

Key : T = Transition; L = Lap
