= Triathlon at the 2016 Summer Paralympics – Women's PT4 =

Women's PT4 at the XV Paralympic Games
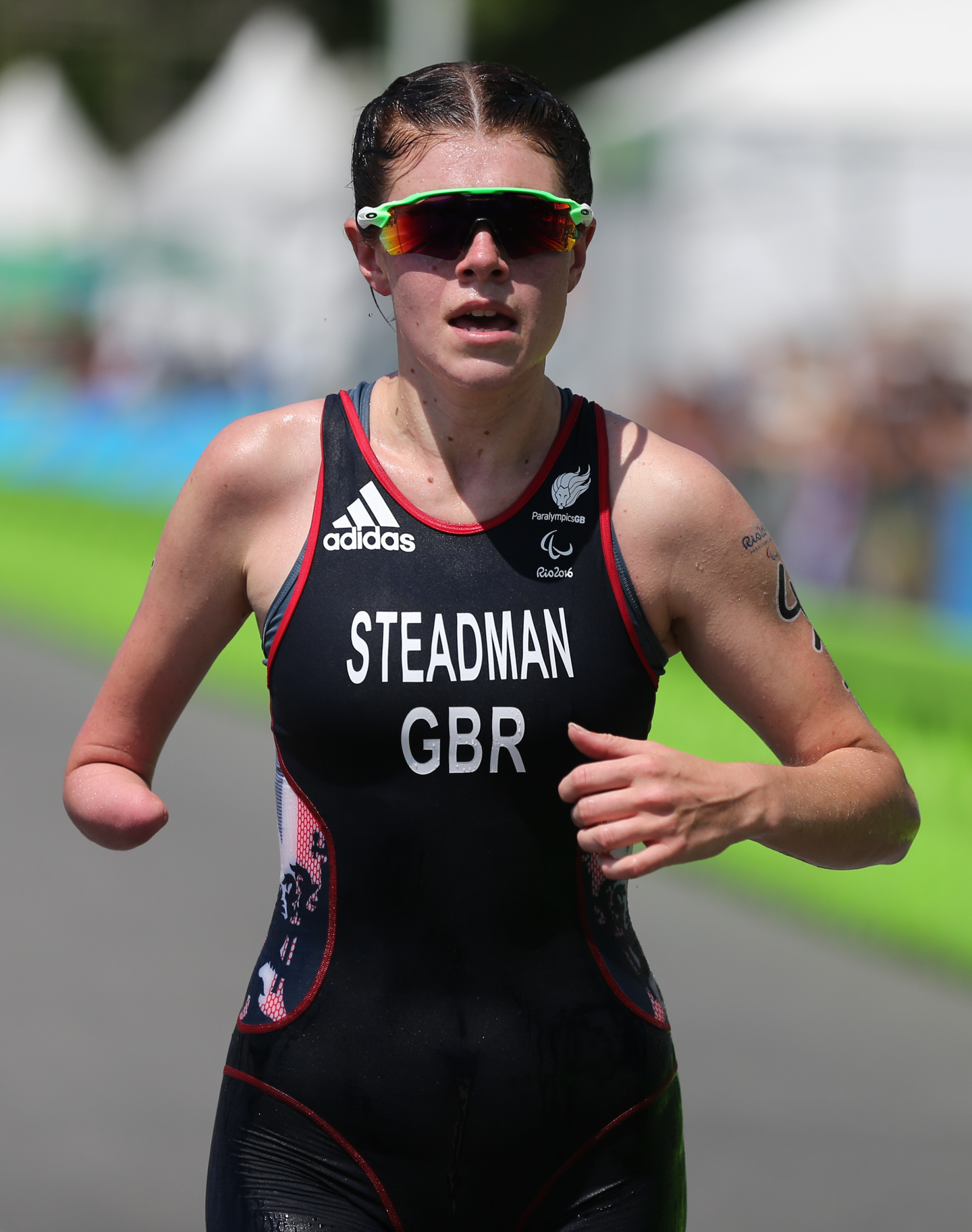
- Lauren Steadman running in the event
- Venue: Fort Copacabana
- Dates: 11 September 2016
- Competitors: 11 from 7 nations

Medalists
| 1st place, gold medalist(s) | | Grace Norman | United States |
| 2nd place, silver medalist(s) | | Lauren Steadman | Great Britain |
| 3rd place, bronze medalist(s) | | Gwladys Lemoussu | France |

The Triathlon at the 2016 Summer Paralympics – Women's PT4 event at the 2016 Paralympic Games took place at 10:00 on 11 September 2016 at Fort Copacabana.

== Results ==
| Rank | Bib | Name | Nationality | Swim | 1st Transition | Bike Lap 1 | Bike Lap 2 | Bike Lap 3 | Bike Lap 4 | 2nd Transition | Run Lap 1 | Run Lap 2 | Time |
|---|---|---|---|---|---|---|---|---|---|---|---|---|---|
| 1st place, gold medalist(s) | 405 | Grace Norman | United States | 10:42 | 1:47 | 9:02 | 9:12 | 9:14 | 9:29 | 0:58 | 9:30 | 10:45 | 1:10:39 |
| 2nd place, silver medalist(s) | 410 | Lauren Steadman | Great Britain | 11:12 | 1:20 | 8:56 | 9:12 | 9:12 | 9:24 | 0:45 | 10:00 | 11:42 | 1:11:43 |
| 3rd place, bronze medalist(s) | 406 | Gwladys Lemoussu | France | 12:24 | 1:23 | 9:28 | 9:40 | 9:40 | 9:46 | 0:52 | 10:15 | 11:03 | 1:14:31 |
| 4 | 409 | Faye McClelland | Great Britain | 12:42 | 1:28 | 9:25 | 9:42 | 9:45 | 10:00 | 0:51 | 10:05 | 11:10 | 1:15:08 |
| 5 | 402 | Kate Doughty | Australia | 11:42 | 1:18 | 9:22 | 9:32 | 9:34 | 9:41 | 0:53 | 11:23 | 12:25 | 1:15:50 |
| 6 | 401 | Alisa Kolpakchy | Ukraine | 14:01 | 1:29 | 9:58 | 10:02 | 10:06 | 10:16 | 0:56 | 10:15 | 11:32 | 1:18:35 |
| 7 | 408 | Clare Cunningham | Great Britain | 12:08 | 1:31 | 10:05 | 10:29 | 10:21 | 10:33 | 1:01 | 10:35 | 12:19 | 1:19:02 |
| 8 | 407 | Chantal Givens | Canada | 15:24 | 1:30 | 9:42 | 9:55 | 9:57 | 10:00 | 0:56 | 10:23 | 11:26 | 1:19:13 |
| 9 | 403 | Claire McLean | Australia | 15:09 | 1:35 | 9:06 | 9:16 | 9:15 | 9:35 | 1:09 | 11:41 | 13:00 | 1:19:46 |
| 10 | 404 | Patricia Collins | United States | 12:36 | 2:23 | 9:51 | 9:54 | 9:43 | 9:48 | 1:21 | 12:10 | 13:22 | 1:21:08 |
| 11 | 411 | Ana Raquel Lins | Brazil | 12:30 | 1:24 | 10:16 | 10:33 | 10:46 | 10:57 | 0:51 | 11:20 | 12:47 | 1:21:24 |

Source: "Women's - PT4 Schedute and Results". Rio 2016 Paralympic Games. Archived from the original on 22 September 2016.
