= Claire Cashmore =

British Paralympic swimmer (born 1988)

Claire Cashmore MBE
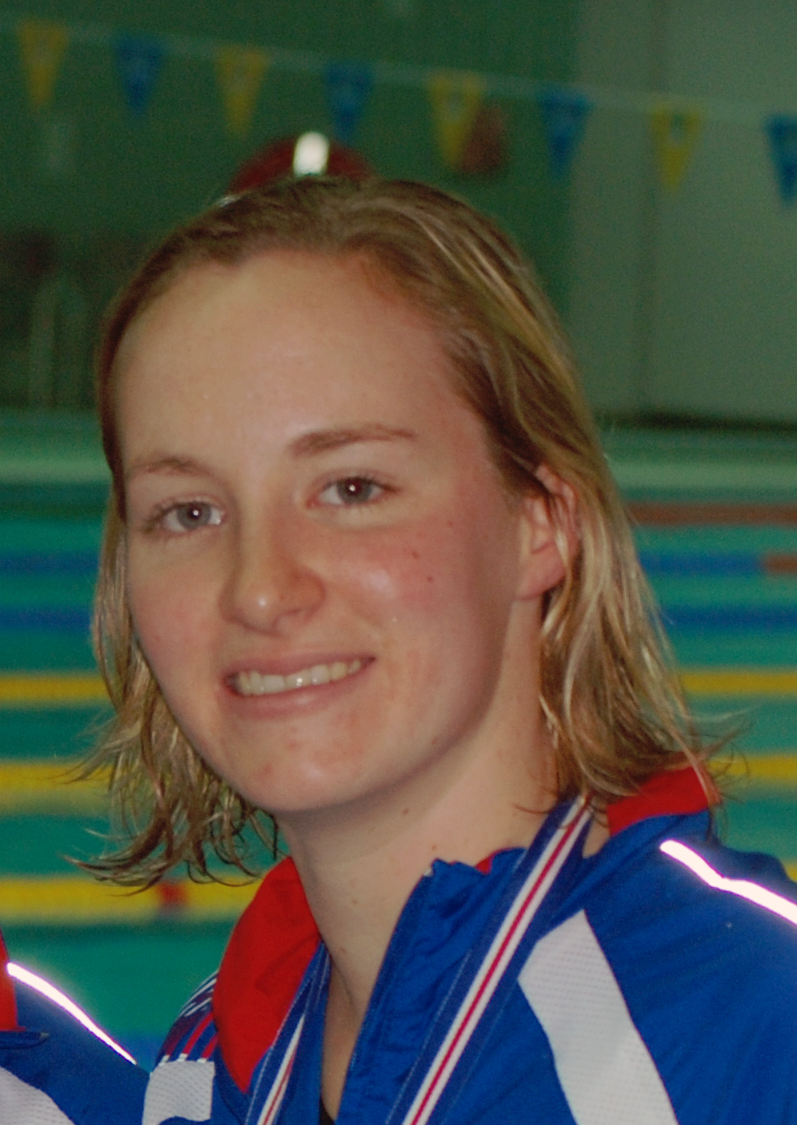
- Cashmore after the 2009 IPC European Championship

Personal information
- Nationality: British
- Born: 21 May 1988 (age 38) Redditch, England
- Height: 1.66 m (5 ft 5 in)

Sport
- Sport: Swimming
- Strokes: Freestyle; Breaststroke; Butterfly; Backstroke
- Club: Manchester HPC
Medal record
Representing Great Britain
Women's paratriathlon
Paralympic Games
Silver medal – second place	2024 Paris	PTS5
Bronze medal – third place	2020 Tokyo	PTS5
World Championships
Gold medal – first place	2019 Lausanne	PTS5
Gold medal – first place	2021 Abu Dhabi	PTS5
Silver medal – second place	2018 Gold Coast	PTS5
Silver medal – second place	2022 Abu Dhabi	PTS5
Silver medal – second place	2023 Ponteverde	PTS5
Silver medal – second place	2024 Torremolinos	PTS5
Silver medal – second place	2024 Torremolinos	Mixed relay
European Championships
Gold medal – first place	2021 Valencia	PTS5
Gold medal – first place	2022 Olsztyn	PTS5
Gold medal – first place	2023 Madrid	PTS5
Silver medal – second place	2018 Tartu	PTS5
Silver medal – second place	2019 Valencia	PTS5
Women's swimming
Paralympic Games
Gold medal – first place	2016 Rio de Janeiro	4 x 100-metre medley relay 34 pts
Silver medal – second place	2016 Rio de Janeiro	Women's 100-metre breaststroke SB8
Silver medal – second place	2012 London	Women's 4 x 100-metre medley relay 34pts
Silver medal – second place	2012 London	Women's 100-metre breaststroke SB8
Bronze medal – third place	2004 Athens	Women's 100m Backstroke S9
Bronze medal – third place	2004 Athens	Women's 200m Individual Medley SM9
Bronze medal – third place	2008 Beijing	Women's 100-metre breaststroke SB8
Bronze medal – third place	2012 London	Women's 4 x 100-metre freestyle relay 34pts
IPC World Championships
Gold medal – first place	2013 Montreal	Women's 4 x 100-metre freestyle relay 34pts
Gold medal – first place	2013 Montreal	Women's 4 x 100-metre medley relay 34pts
Gold medal – first place	2015 Glasgow	4x100m medley relay 34pts
Silver medal – second place	2006 Durban	100m breaststroke SB8
Silver medal – second place	2006 Durban	4 x 100-metre freestyle relay 34pts
Silver medal – second place	2010 Eindhoven	100m breaststroke SB8
Silver medal – second place	2010 Eindhoven	4 x 100-metre freestyle relay 34pts
Silver medal – second place	2010 Eindhoven	4 x 100-metre medley relay 34pts
Silver medal – second place	2013 Montreal	100m breaststroke SB9
Silver medal – second place	2015 Glasgow	100m breaststroke SB8
Bronze medal – third place	2013 Montreal	200m individual medley SM9
Bronze medal – third place	2015 Glasgow	4x100 m Freestyle Relay 34pts
IPC European Championships
Gold medal – first place	2009 Reykjavik	4×100 m medley relay 34 pts
Gold medal – first place	2011 Berlin	4x100m Freestyle Relay (34pts)
Gold medal – first place	2011 Berlin	4x100m Medley Relay (34pts)
Gold medal – first place	2014 Eindhoven	100m Breaststroke (SB8)
Gold medal – first place	2014 Eindhoven	4x100m medley relay 34pts
Gold medal – first place	2016 Funchal	100m medley relay 34pts
Silver medal – second place	2011 Berlin	100m Breaststroke (SB8)
Bronze medal – third place	2009 Reykjavik	50 m freestyle S9
Bronze medal – third place	2009 Reykjavík	100m Breaststroke (SB8)
Bronze medal – third place	2011 Berlin	100m Butterfly (S9)
Bronze medal – third place	2011 Berlin	200m Individual Medley (SM9)
Bronze medal – third place	2016 Funchal	100 m breaststroke SB8
Bronze medal – third place	2016 Funchal	100 m butterfly S9

Claire Cashmore (born 21 May 1988) is a Paralympic Swimming Champion and PTS5 classified British paratriathlete. She has been to four Paralympic Games with swimming and has won 4 bronze, 3 silver, and 1 gold medal. Cashmore also broke the world record in the SM9 100m Individual Medley in 2009. She decided to switch to competing in paratriathlon after winning gold and silver at the Paralympic Games in 2016, and became ITU World Champion in the PTS5 classification in 2019. Claire Cashmore is based in Loughborough, England. She was born in Redditch, England, without a left forearm.

== Career ==
Cashmore made her debut for ParalympicsGB as a 16-year-old competing at Athens in 2004, winning two bronze medals. She won her first international medal in the 100m breaststroke SB8 at the 2006 IPC Swimming World Championships in Durban. During the 2009 season, Cashmore broke the European 200m IM record and represented GB at the World Short-Course Championships in Rio. Cashmore went on to win a bronze at the Paralympic Games in Beijing in 2008, and a further two silvers and a bronze at the Paralympic Games in London 2012. In 2014, she claimed her first individual gold medal on the international stage, marking her third IPC Swimming European Championships with a gold medal in the 100m breaststroke SB8. At the Paralympic Games in Rio de Janeiro in 2016 Claire took silver in the 100m breaststroke SB8 and also claimed a gold medal in the 4 × 100 m medley relay.

After competing in Rio, Cashmore took some time to reflect on her career and decided to transition into Paratriathlon. She was given a place on the UK Sport talent transfer programme and made her major international debut at the 2017 ITU World Triathlon Grand Final Rotterdam. The 2018 season saw Cashmore win gold in the GBR Paratriathlon National Championships and four consecutive silver medals at the Eton Dorney ITU Paratriathlon World Cup, Iseo - Franciacorta ITU World Paratriathlon Series, Tartu ETU Triathlon European Championships and ITU World Triathlon Grand Final Gold Coast.

She enjoyed a number of successes in 2019 winning silver medals in the PTS5 classification at the Yokohama ITU World Paratriathlon Series, the Tokyo ITU Paratriathlon World Cup and the Valencia ETU Paratriathlon European Championships. However, her greatest achievements of the year saw her win gold at the GBR Paratriathlon National Championships, the Groupe Copley World Paratriathlon Series Montreal and the ITU World Triathlon Grand Final in Lausanne where she became ITU World Champion in the PTS5 classification.

Before the 2020 Summer Paralympics, Cashmore was tipped as a favourite for the Paratriathlon. She ultimately won bronze, with compatriot Lauren Steadman taking the gold.

== Personal life ==
Cashmore was born on 21 May 1988 in Redditch, England, without a left forearm. She attended Dubai English Speaking School from 1994 and Hagley Catholic High School in Hagley, Worcestershire. Cashmore graduated from the University of Leeds in 2011 with a bachelor's degree in linguistics and phonetics.

Cashmore was appointed Member of the Order of the British Empire (MBE) in the 2017 New Year Honours for services to swimming.

== Paratriathlon Competitions ==
The following list of results. Unless indicated otherwise, the competitions are paratriathlons.

Date	Competition	Rank
2019-09-14	Valencia ETU Paratriathlon European Championships	2
2019-09-01	ITU World Triathlon Grand Final Lausanne	1
2019-08-17	Tokyo ITU Paratriathlon World Cup	2
2019-06-28	Groupe Copley World Paratriathlon Series Montreal	1
2019-05-27	GBR Paratriathlon National Championships	1
2019-05-18	Yokohama ITU World Paratriathlon Series	2
2018-09-15	ITU World Triathlon Grand Final Gold Coast	2
2018-07-28	GBR Paratriathlon National Championships	1
2018-07-19	Tartu ETU Triathlon European Championships	2
2018-06-30	Iseo-Franciacorta ITU World Paratriathlon Series	2
2018-05-28	Eton Dorney ITU Paratriathlon World Cup	2
2017-09-15	ITU World Triathlon Grand Final Rotterdam	6
2017-08-28	GBR Paratriathlon National Championships	1
2017-07-28	Edmonton ITU World Paratriathlon Series	4
2017-07-02	Altafulla ITU Paratriathlon World Cup	1

DNF = Did not finish

DNS = Did not start

DSQ = Disqualified
