= Kamylle Frenette =

Canadian paratriathlete

Personal information
- Born: July 4, 1996 (age 29)
- Home town: Dieppe, New Brunswick, Canada

Sport
- Sport: Paratriathlon
- Disability: PTS5

Achievements and titles
- Paralympic finals: 2020 Summer Paralympics and 2024 Summer Paralympics: 4th place
Medal record
Women's paratriathlon
Representing Canada
Americas Championships
Silver medal – second place	2017 Sarasota	PTS5
Silver medal – second place	2024 Miami	PTS5

Kamylle Frenette (born July 4, 1996) is a Canadian paratriathlete, competing in the PTS5 classification.

== Early life and education ==
Frenette was born with Unilateral Talipes Equinovarus, more commonly known as unilateral clubfoot. She had corrective surgery at four-months old at the IWK children's hospital in Halifax, which straightened her foot, but left her with a right foot smaller than her left and reduced mobility in her ankle.

Frenette grew up in Dieppe, New Brunswick. Her father was a triathlete. She studied biology at the Université de Moncton. She graduated from Dalhousie University in 2022 with a degree in pharmacy.

== Career ==
Frenette began participating in triathlons when she was 16 years old. Shortly before her 18th birthday, she competed in an Ironman in Montreal.

Frenette ran with the varsity cross-country team at the Université de Moncton, competing from 2014 to 2018. She made her international paratriathlon debut competing for Canada in 2018 after being approached by Triathlon Canada's Para head coach, Carolyn Murray, in late 2016. In the 2018 ITU Paratriathlon World Cup, Frenette won the Magog, Quebec event, placed second at the France event, and placed fourth at the Australia event. She placed second at the Para-Triathlon World Series in Edmonton. She also finished fourth at the 2019 Paratriathlon World Championships.

In 2021, she placed second at the Americas Triathlon Para Championships in Pleasant Prairie and third at the World Triathlon Para Cup in A Coruna. In her Paralympic debut at Tokyo 2020, Frenette placed fourth in the women's PTS5. In the 2022 World Triathlon Para Cups, Frenette placed third at the Besançon and A Corona events, second at the World Triathlon Para Series Montreal, and then third at the 2022 World Triathlon Grand Finals in Abu Dhabi in the women's PTS5. She won the Montreal event in her classification at the World Triathlon Para Series in 2022.

The 2023 World Triathlon Para Cup in Paris was changed to a duathlon due to concerns about water quality. Frentte placed third in the duathlon. In the Montreal event on the 2024 World Triathlon Series Para circuit, Frenette won the PTS5 in one hour, seven minutes and 59 seconds. She also placed second at the Swansea event on the circuit in the women's standing PTS 5.

Frenette was ranked fourth in the world heading into the 2024 Summer Paralympics. She placed fourth in the women's PTS5. She was fourth out of the water, and sixth out of the bike into the run, finishing 3:05 behind the bronze medalist. Following the 2024 Paralympics, she retired from competing.
