= Triathlon at the 2020 Summer Paralympics – Women's PTS5 =

Women's PTS5 at the XVI Paralympic Games
- Venue: Odaiba Marine Park
- Dates: 29 August 2021
- Competitors: 10 from 8 nations

Medalists
1st place, gold medalist(s)		Lauren Steadman	Great Britain
2nd place, silver medalist(s)		Grace Norman	United States
3rd place, bronze medalist(s)		Claire Cashmore	Great Britain

The Triathlon at the 2020 Summer Paralympics – Women's PTS5 event at the 2020 Paralympic Games took place at 08:31 on 29 August 2021 at the Odaiba Marine Park.

== Results ==
Key : T = Transition; L = Lap

Rank	Bib	Name	Nationality	Swim	T1	Bike				T2	Run				Time
Rank	Bib	Name	Nationality	Swim	T1	L1	L2	L3	L4	T2	L1	L2	L3	L4	Time
1st place, gold medalist(s)	510	Lauren Steadman	Great Britain	11:55	1:01	7:58	7:50	7:49	8:08	1:00	4:22	4:51	4:51	5:01	1:04:46
2nd place, silver medalist(s)	504	Grace Norman	United States	11:10	1:09	8:09	8:05	8:08	8:16	1:02	4:27	4:52	4:53	5:16	1:05:27
3rd place, bronze medalist(s)	509	Claire Cashmore	Great Britain	11:53	1:04	8:34	8:06	8:08	9:20	0:49	4:16	4:59	5:01	5:26	1:07:36
4	505	Kamylle Frenette	Canada	11:54	1:05	8:43	8:39	8:42	8:54	0:46	4:38	5:21	5:28	5:59	1:10:09
5	508	Alisa Kolpakchy	Ukraine	15:14	1:07	9:00	8:54	8:59	9:16	0:51	4:27	5:05	5:13	5:23	1:13:29
6	501	Gwladys Lemoussu	France	13:09	1:02	9:02	9:11	9:16	9:18	0:52	4:48	5:39	5:58	6:20	1:14:35
7	503	Kelly Elmlinger	United States	15:15	1:40	9:08	9:07	9:16	9:25	1:07	4:45	5:34	5:46	6:25	1:17:28
8	506	Anna Bychkova	RPC	14:34	1:19	9:51	9:58	10:16	10:37	1:04	4:52	5:23	5:22	6:02	1:19:18
9	507	Petra Lévay	Hungary	15:50	1:17	9:23	9:15	9:23	9:41	1:02	5:35	6:20	6:14	6:43	1:20:43
10	502	Mami Tani	Japan	13:06	1:41	9:59	9:48	9:54	9:38	1:24	5:36	6:40	6:51	7:46	1:22:23
