= Gwladys Lemoussu =

French paratriathlete (born 1989)

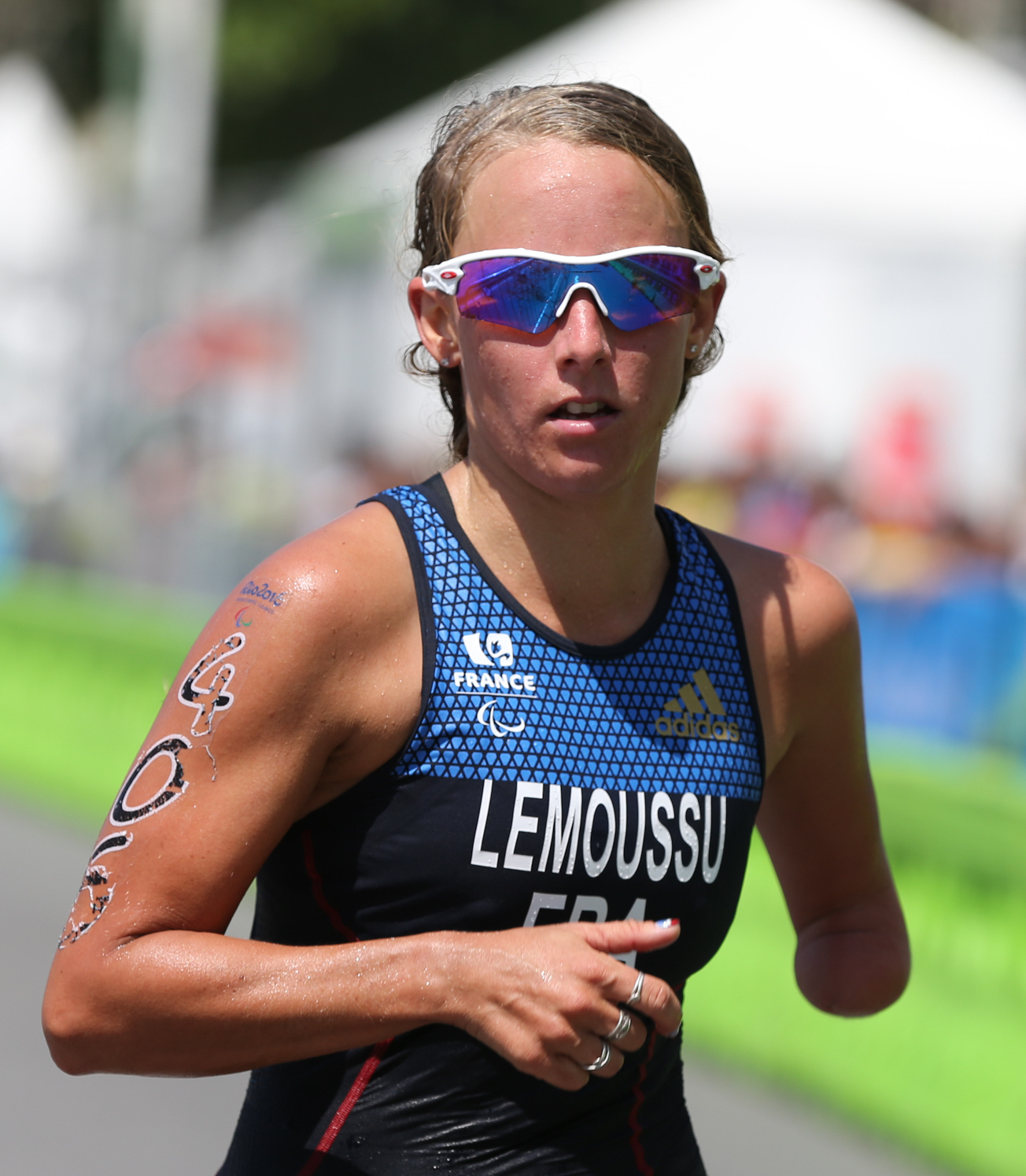
- Gwladys Lemoussu (2016)

Personal information
- Born: 12 April 1989 (age 37)

Sport
- Country: France
- Sport: Paratriathlon
Medal record
Women's paratriathlon
Representing France
Paralympic Games
Bronze medal – third place	2016 Rio de Janeiro	PT4
World Championships
Silver medal – second place	2016 Rotterdam	PT4
Bronze medal – third place	2017 Rotterdam	PTS5
European Championships
Silver medal – second place	2017 Kitzbühel	PTS5
Silver medal – second place	2021 Valencia	PTS5
Silver medal – second place	2022 Olsztyn	PTS5
Silver medal – second place	2024 Vichy	PTS5
Bronze medal – third place	2016 Lisbon	PT4
Bronze medal – third place	2018 Tartu	PTS5
Bronze medal – third place	2019 Valencia	PTS5
Bronze medal – third place	2023 Madrid	PTS5

Gwladys Lemoussu (born 12 April 1989) is a French paratriathlete. She represented France at the 2016 Summer Paralympics held in Rio de Janeiro, Brazil and she won the bronze medal in the women's PT4 event.

She also competed in the women's PTS5 event at the 2020 Summer Paralympics held in Tokyo, Japan.
