= Grace Norman =

American Paralympic triathlete (born 1998)

Personal information
- Born: March 9, 1998 (age 28)

Sport
- Country: United States
- Sport: Paratriathlon
- Disability class: PTS5
Medal record
Women's paratriathlon
Representing United States
Paralympic Games
Gold medal – first place	2016 Rio de Janeiro	PT4
Silver medal – second place	2020 Tokyo	PTS5
Gold medal – first place	2024 Paris	PTS5
World Championships
Gold medal – first place	2016 Rotterdam	PT4
Gold medal – first place	2017 Rotterdam	PTS5
Gold medal – first place	2022 Abu Dhabi	PTS5
Gold medal – first place	2023 Ponteverde	PTS5
Gold medal – first place	2023 Ponteverde	Mixed relay
Gold medal – first place	2024 Torremolinos	PTS5
Gold medal – first place	2024 Torremolinos	Mixed relay
Gold medal – first place	2025 Wollongong	PTS5
Gold medal – first place	2025 Wollongong	Mixed relay
Gold medal – first place	2026 Pontevedra	PTS5
Silver medal – second place	2015 Chicago	PT4
Silver medal – second place	2021 Abu Dhabi	PTS5
Bronze medal – third place	2018 Gold Coast	PTS5
Bronze medal – third place	2019 Lausanne	PTS5
Americas Championships
Gold medal – first place	2016 Sarasota	PT4
Gold medal – first place	2017 Sarasota	PTS5
Gold medal – first place	2018 Sarasota-Bradenton	PTS5
Gold medal – first place	2019 Sarasota-Bradenton	PTS5
Gold medal – first place	2021 Pleasant Prairie	PTS5
Gold medal – first place	2022 Sarasota-Bradenton	PTS5
Gold medal – first place	2023 Sarasota	PTS5
Gold medal – first place	2024 Miami	PTS5
Silver medal – second place	2015 Monterrey	PT4

Grace Norman (born March 9, 1998) is an American Parathlete. She was the 2016 Paralympics gold medalist in the Women's individual PT4 Paratriathlon. She also won the silver medal in the women's PTS5 event at the 2020 Summer Paralympics held in Tokyo, Japan, as well as the gold medal in the women's PTS5 event at the 2024 Summer Paralympics held in Paris, France.

Norman attended and raced for Cedarville University from 2016 to 2020.
