= Ognjen Stojanović =

Serbian triathlete (born 1990)

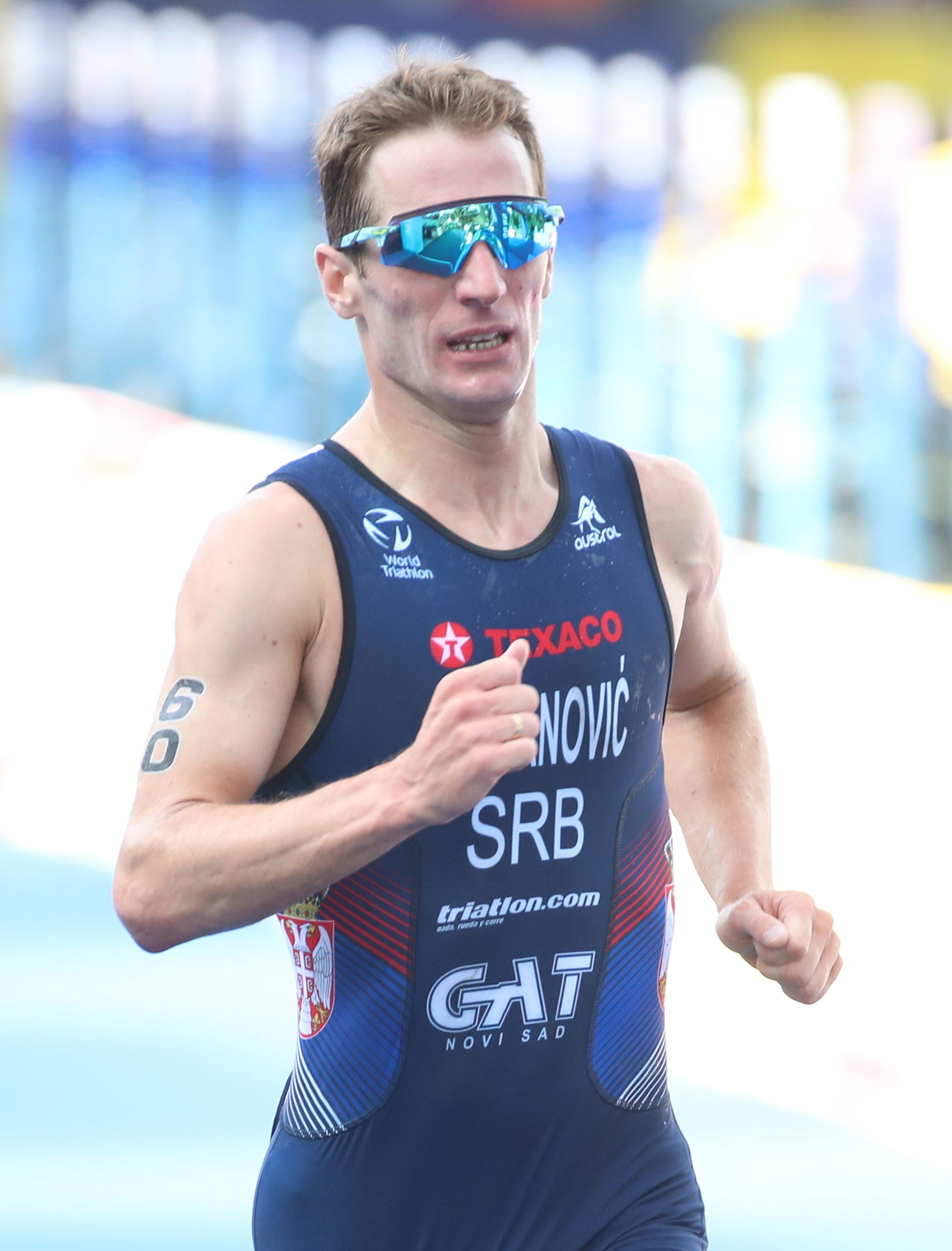

Personal information
- Born: 24 January 1990 (age 36) Novi Sad, Yugoslavia
- Height: 1.83 m (6 ft 0 in)

Sport
- Country: Serbia
- Sport: Triathlon
Medal record
Representing Serbia
Men's aquathlon
ITU Aquathlon World Championships
Bronze medal – third place	2012 Auckland	Elite
ETU European Aquathlon Championships
Gold medal – first place	2019 Targu Mures	Elite
ETU European Aquathlon Championships
Silver medal – second place	2021 Walchsee	Elite

Ognjen Stojanović (Serbian Cyrillic: Огњен Стојановић, born 24 January 1990 in Novi Sad) is a Serbian triathlete.

== Career ==
Stojanović, at an early age, was diagnosed with the bone disease Legg–Calvé–Perthes syndrome and as a result, had his hip operated on. Because this limited his mobility he began swimming. After competing in swimming for 11 years he got involved in triathlon in 2005. He started practicing all three sports and in 2006, after just one year in the sport, he became a national junior champion. In 2007 he won the National Senior Championship and the European Junior Cup in Eilat later that year.

In 2008 Stojanović made three podium finishes on European junior cups and was later recognized by ITU Sport Development and participated on Australian Youth Olympic Festival in Sydney in January 2009 where he finished 13th as an individual and 4th in relays with ITU team. In the same year he became first ever Balkan senior champion in Olympic distance triathlon while he was still in junior category. In 2009 he took 4th place at the ITU Aquathlon World Championships. In 2011 he won Pan American continental cup in Cartagena, Colombia, and took third at the ITU World Aquathlon Championships in Auckland in 2012.

Stojanović founded the Triogy Racing club in Serbia in 2013. That same year he began racing long-distance triathlon with the Arenales 113 race in Elche, with the time of 3:44:55 where he finished 6th overall. Later he finished in 16th place at the ETU European U23 Championships in Holten, Netherlands, and then first at the National Marathon Championships with overall win at Novosadski Maraton with the time of 2:46:29.

In 2014 Stojanović won both duathlon and triathlon ITU Balkan Championships and also qualified for the 2015 European Games in Baku, Azerbaijan. In 2015 at the European games he took 18th and won the ETU Balkan Championship in Zagreb, Croatia.

2016 saw him taking a silver medal at the ITU Asian Cup Taizhou in China, and a win at the ETU Balkan Championships in Olimp, Romania, which was his 8th title. He finished 6th at Ironman 70.3 Budapest (pro category) and 3rd at Ironman 70.3 Pula (overall category; pro category was not held).

In 2017, Ognjen continued his domination in Balkan region with a 9th win at ETU Balkan Championships which was held in Bulgaria. In Taizhou in China on ITU Asian Cup he took bronze medal, and also won the national 10 km road race in Kula, Serbia. At the end of the season he was 12th on World Cup Salinas in Ecuador.

In 2018, he won his 10th Balkan championships title.

2019 was great year for Ognjen as he won European Aquathlon Championships in Targu Mures in Romania. He also won two Continental Cups and made podium on 6 Continental Cup races.

== Notable accomplishments ==
- Multiple Ironman 70.3 and Challenge Family podium finishes
- 6th place at Ironman 70.3 European Championships Tallinn 2023
- 19th place at Ironman 70.3 World Championships Lahti 2023
- European Aquathlon champion 2019 and vice champion 2021
- 12 times Balkan champion
- 12 World Triathlon Continental Cup podiums with 5 wins
- 18th place European Games Baku 2015
- Multiple national triathlon champion
- National champion and medalist on 5 km, 10 km, half-marathon and marathon championships

== Personal ==
Stojanović finished mathematical high school, the first year of applied mathematics at University of Novi Sad and has a Master of Sports Coaching (MSc) degree at Faculty of Sport in Belgrade.
