= Sally Pilbeam =

Australian paratriathlete

Personal information
- Nationality: Australian
- Born: 14 April 1978 (age 48)
Medal record
Representing Australia
Women's paratriathlon
World Championships
| Gold medal – first place | 2014 Edmonton | PT3 |
| Gold medal – first place | 2015 Chicago | PT3 |
| Silver medal – second place | 2016 Rotterdam | PT3 |
| Silver medal – second place | 2017 Rotterdam | PTS4 |
| Silver medal – second place | 2018 Gold Coast | PTS3 |
| Bronze medal – third place | 2023 Ponteverde | PTS4 |
| Bronze medal – third place | 2024 Torremolinos | PTS4 |
Oceania Championships
| Gold medal – first place | 2014 Penrith | PT3 |
| Gold medal – first place | 2015 Penrith | PT3 |
| Gold medal – first place | 2016 Devonport | PT3 |
| Gold medal – first place | 2018 St. Kilda | PTS4 |
| Gold medal – first place | 2019 Newcastle | PTS4 |
| Gold medal – first place | 2020 Newcastle | PTS4 |
| Silver medal – second place | 2024 Stockton | PTS4 |
Women's para-duathlon
World Championships
| Gold medal – first place | 2015 Adelaide | PT3 |

Sally Pilbeam (born 14 April 1978) is an arm amputee Australian paratriathlete. In 2014 and 2015, she won gold medals at the World Triathlon Series Finals. She competed at the 2024 Paris Paralympics.

== Personal ==
Pilbeam was born on 14 April 1978 and lives in Perth, Western Australia. She is married and has two sons. In 2002, she lost her right arm at the shoulder due to cancer.In 2025, she was appointed Western Australian Institute of Sport Para Unit Athlete Wellbeing and Engagement Advisor.

== Paratriathlon ==
She rides a modified bike in the cycling leg of paratriathlon events. In 2014, she was classified as a PTS3 paratriathlete.

Pilbeam, first competed at the Australian Paratriathlon Championships in 2013. At the 2013 ITU World Triathlon Series Final in London, England, she finished eighth in the Women's TRI-4. In 2014, she won Oceania Paratriathlon Championships, ITU World Paratriathlon Event in Melbourne, Australia and ITU World Paratriathlon Event in Yokohama, Japan in Women's PT3 events. In August 2014, she won her first world championship by winning the Women's PT3 at the 2014 ITU World Triathlon Series Final in Edmonton, Alberta, Canada.

In January 2015, Pilbeam won the Oceania Paratriathlon Championships PT3 event at Penrith, New South Wales. At the 2015 World Championships Final in Chicago, she won the gold medal in the Women's PT3.

She won silver medals at the 2016, 2017 and 2018 ITU World Championships Series Finals. At the 2019 ITU World Triathlon Grand Final in Lausanne, she finished fifth in the Women's PTS5. In 2017, she was transferred to PTS4 events. In July 2020, she announced her retirement from elite triathlon to spend more time with her family. She returned to competition in July 2022, as her event was included on the 2024 Paris Paralympics program. Pilbeam goes into the Paris Games ranked seventh in the Women's PTS4. She finished seventh at the 2024 Summer Paralympics.

At the 2025 World Triathlon Para Championships in Wollongong, she finished fourth in the Women's PTS4.

Her coach is Andrew Budge.
