= List of French people =

French people of note include:

== Actors ==
=== A–C ===
- Carole Achache
- Isabelle Adjani
- Renée Adorée
- Anouk Aimée
- Flo Ankah
- Arletty
- Antonin Artaud
- Fanny Ardant
- Jeanne Aubert
- Jean-Louis Aubert
- Jean-Pierre Aumont
- Claude Autant-Lara
- Daniel Auteuil
- Charles Aznavour
- Brigitte Bardot
- Emmanuelle Béart
- Loleh Bellon
- Jean-Paul Belmondo
- François Berléand
- Charles Berling
- Éric Bernard
- Adam Bessa
- Suzanne Bianchetti
- Juliette Binoche
- Bernard Blier
- Sandrine Bonnaire
- Élodie Bouchez
- Bourvil
- Dany Boon
- Angelique Boyer
- Charles Boyer
- Guillaume Canet
- Capucine
- Martine Carol
- Leslie Caron
- Isabelle Carré
- Vincent Cassel
- Jean-Pierre Cassel
- Laetitia Casta
- Monique Chaumette
- Robert Clary
- Grégoire Colin
- Marion Cotillard
- Clotilde Courau
- Darry Cowl

=== D–L ===
- Béatrice Dalle
- Lili Damita
- Danielle Darrieux
- Alain Delon
- Danièle Delorme
- Julie Delpy
- Catherine Deneuve
- Élisabeth Depardieu
- Gérard Depardieu
- Guillaume Depardieu
- Patrick Dewaere
- Arielle Dombasle
- Michel Drucker
- Morgane Dubled
- Jean Dujardin
- Anny Dupérey
- Romain Duris
- Nicolas Duvauchelle
- Erwan Kepoa Falé
- Fernandel
- Brigitte Fossey
- Louis de Funès
- Félicité Du Jeu
- Jean Gabin
- Julie Gayet
- Annie Girardot
- Judith Godrèche
- Eva Green
- Sacha Guitry
- Isabelle Huppert
- Irène Jacob
- Claude Jade
- Marlène Jobert
- Valérie Kaprisky
- Louise Labèque
- Mélanie Laurent
- Jean-Pierre Léaud
- Virginie Ledoyen
- Noémie Lenoir
- Max Linder
- Sheryfa Luna

=== M–Z ===
- Philippe Maidenberg
- Marcel Marceau
- Sophie Marceau
- Jean Marais
- Jean-Pierre Marielle
- Ali Marhyar
- Olivier Martinez
- Jean-Baptiste Maunier
- Bernard Minet
- Miou-Miou
- Mistinguett
- Yves Montand
- Jeanne Moreau
- Michèle Morgan
- Musidora
- Pierre Niney
- Gérard Philipe
- Michel Piccoli
- Clémence Poésy
- Alexia Portal
- Yvonne Printemps
- Marguerite Priola, stage name of Marguerite–Marie–Sophie Polliart
- Pérette Pradier
- Jérôme Pradon
- Rachel, pseudonym for Elisa-Rachel Félix
- Gabrielle Réjane
- Jean Reno
- Marine Renoir
- Pierre Richard
- Sebastian Roché
- Jean Rochefort
- Béatrice Romand
- Philippine de Rothschild
- Nathalie Roussel
- Michel Roux
- Emmanuelle Seigner
- David Serero
- Léa Seydoux
- Delphine Seyrig
- Simone Signoret
- Audrey Tautou
- Jean-Louis Trintignant
- Marie Trintignant
- Gaspard Ulliel
- Michael Vartan
- Hervé Villechaize
- Mallory Wanecque
- Lambert Wilson

== Architects ==
- Jacques-François Blondel
- Germain Boffrand
- Étienne-Louis Boullée
- Salomon de Brosse
- Libéral Bruant
- Androuet du Cerceau family
- Le Corbusier pseudonym for Charles Edouard Jeanneret (Swiss-born)
- Philibert de l'Orme
- Gustave Eiffel
- Pierre François Léonard Fontaine
- Ange-Jacques Gabriel
- Charles Garnier
- Tony Garnier
- Hector Guimard
- Villard de Honnecourt
- Pierre Jeanneret (Swiss-born)
- Henri Labrouste
- Claude Nicolas Ledoux
- Pierre Lescot
- André Lurçat
- Robert Mallet-Stevens
- François Mansart
- Jules Hardouin Mansart
- Louis Métezeau
- Michel Mimran (born 1954)
- Jean Nouvel
- Charles Percier
- Claude Perrault
- Dominique Perrault
- Auguste Perret
- Christian de Portzamparc
- Jean Prouvé
- Alain Provost
- Henri Sauvage
- Jacques-Germain Soufflot
- Louis Le Vau
- Eugène Viollet-le-Duc

== Artists ==
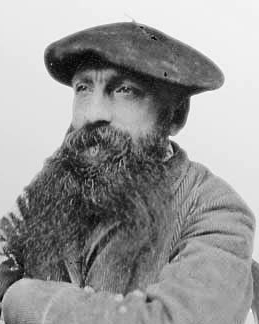
Auguste Rodin

=== Photographers ===
- Carole Achache
- Yann Arthus-Bertrand
- Brassaï born in Hungary
- Henri Cartier-Bresson
- Raymond Depardon
- Robert Doisneau
- Pierre Dubreuil
- Jules Gervais-Courtellemont
- Nadar
- Willy Ronis

=== Sculptors ===
- Frédéric Bartholdi
- Antoine Bourdelle
- Antonin Carlès
- Jean-Baptiste Carpeaux
- César
- Antoine-Denis Chaudet
- Camille Claudel
- Paul Dubois
- Raymond Duchamp-Villon
- Alexandre Falguière
- Jean-Antoine Houdon
- René Iché
- Antonin Idrac
- Antonin Mercié
- Hippolyte Moulin
- Émile Louis Picault
- Jean-Baptiste Pigalle
- Antoine-Augustin Préault
- Auguste Rodin
- René Rozet
- François Rude
- Niki de Saint Phalle
- Sacha Sosno
- Marie-Renée Ucciani

== Athletes ==
=== A–J ===
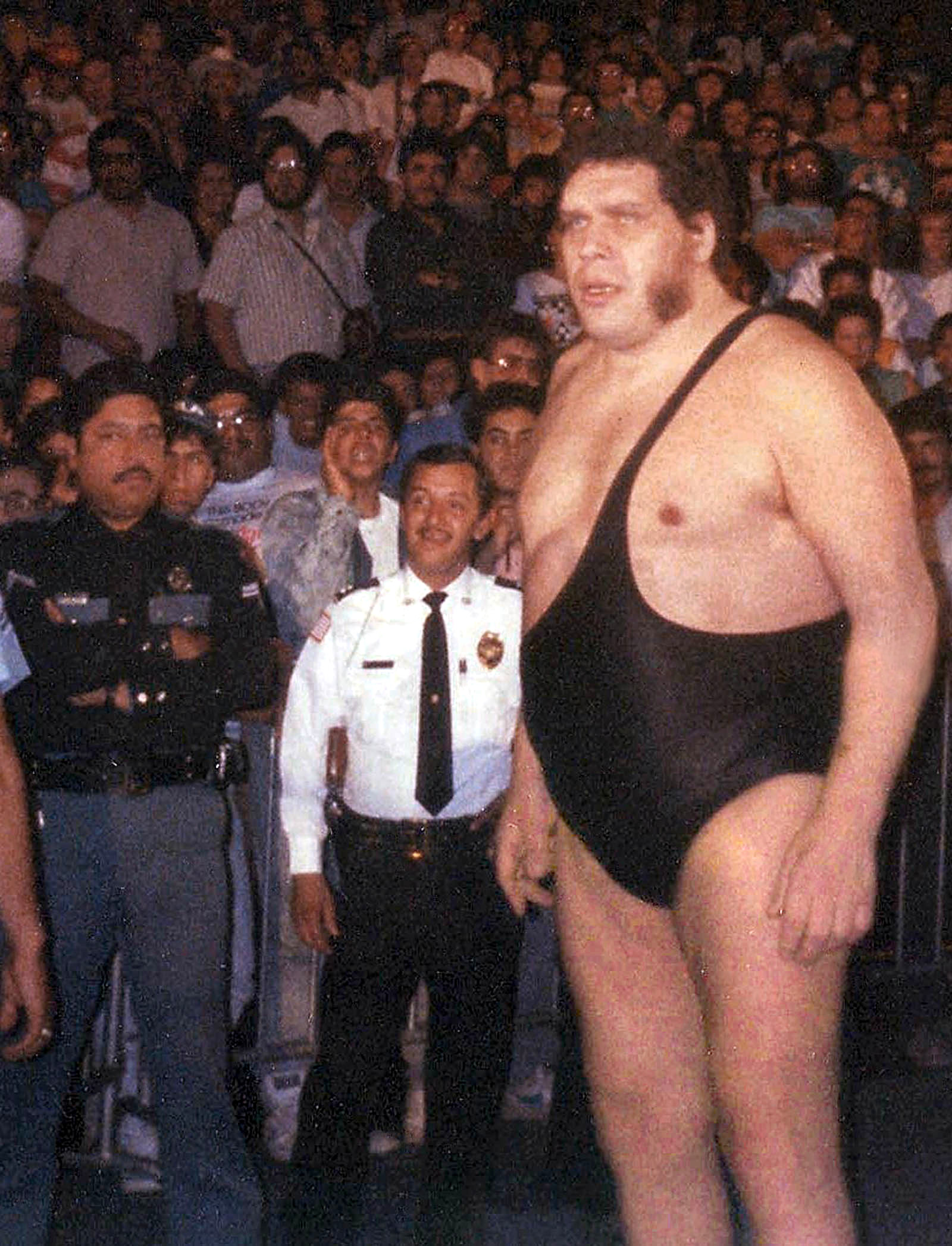
André the Giant

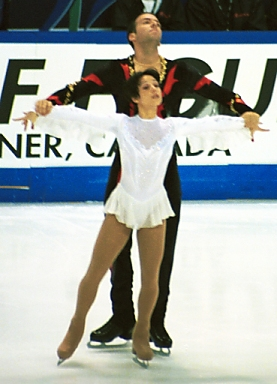
Sarah Abitbol

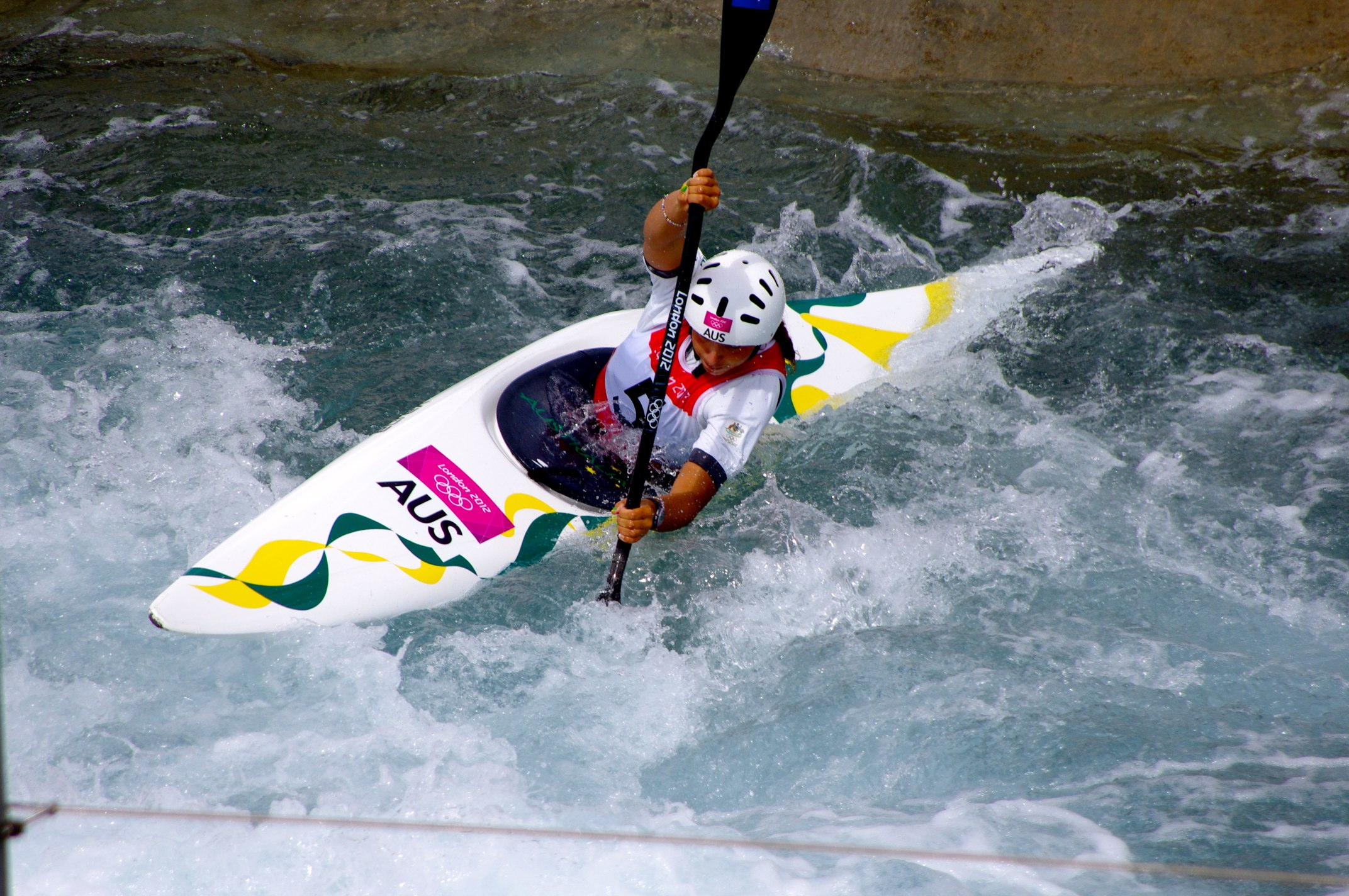
Jessica Fox

- André the Giant, professional wrestler
- Tareq Abdesselem, Karateka
- Sarah Abitbol, pairs figure skater (with Stéphane Bernadis); World Figure Skating Championship bronze
- Tariq Abdul-Wahad (born Olivier Saint-Jean), basketball player
- Luc Alphand, Alpine skier
- Jacques Anquetil, cyclist
- Jonathan Assous, France/Israel, defensive midfielder (Beitar Ramat Gan)
- Fabien Barthez, football player and racing driver
- Elliot Benchetrit, tennis player
- Brice Blanc, jockey
- Marion Bartoli, tennis player
- Fabrice Benichou, world-champion super bantamweight boxer
- Stéphane Bernadis, pairs figure skater (with Sarah Abitbol)
- Alain Bernard, Olympic swimmer
- Serge Betsen, Cameroon-born French citizen, rugby player
- Serge Blanco, Venezuela-born French citizen, rugby player
- Jean Bloch, Olympic silver football player
- Louison Bobet, cyclist
- Stéphanie Bodet, rock climber
- Surya Bonaly, figure skater
- Sébastien Bourdais, Indycar driver
- Frédéric Bourdillon (born 1991), French-Israeli basketball player in the Israel Basketball Premier League
- Andrée Brunet and Pierre Brunet, 1928 and 1932 Olympic skating gold medalists
- Jean-Luc Cairon (born 1962), gymnast and coach
- Alain Calmat, figure skater, Olympic silver, world championship gold, silver, two-time bronze
- Philippe Candeloro, figure skater
- Eric Cantona, football player
- Georges Carpentier, world-champion boxer
- Marcel Cerdan, world-champion boxer
- François Cevert (born François Goldenberg), Formula One driver
- Eugène Christophe, cyclist
- Albert Clément (c. 1878–1907), motor racing driver
- Robert Cohen, world-champion bantamweight boxer
- Stéphanie Cohen-Aloro, tennis player
- Eugène Criqui, world-champion boxer
- Jean Cruguet, jockey of Seattle Slew
- Richard Dacoury, basketball player
- Pierre Darmon, tennis player, highest world ranking # 8
- André Darrigade, cyclist
- Mathieu Debuchy, football player
- Émile Delahaye, race car pioneer
- Marcel Desailly, Ghana-born French citizen, football player
- Abou Diaby, football player
- Boris Diaw, basketball player
- David Douillet, judoka
- Yves Dreyfus, épée fencer, Olympic bronze medal, French champion
- Isabelle Duchesnay and Paul Duchesnay, ice dancers
- Alojzy Ehrlich, Poland, table tennis, 3x won silver and 1x won bronze in the World Championships, incarcerated by the Nazis in Auschwitz, represented France after 1945.
- Andre Ethier, Major League Baseball outfielder for the Los Angeles Dodgers
- Patrice Evra, football player for Monaco and Manchester United
- André Fabre, horse trainer
- Evan Fournier, basketball player
- Laurent Fignon, cyclist
- Jeremy Flores, surfer
- Just Fontaine, football player
- Jacques Fouroux, rugby union player and coach
- Jessica Fox (born 1994), French-born Australian, slalom canoer, Olympic and world champion gold medalist
- Myriam Fox-Jerusalmi, slalom canoer, Olympic bronze (K-1 slalom), five golds at ICF Canoe Slalom World Championships (two-time K-1, three-time K-1 team)
- Pierre Galle, basketball player and coach
- Pierre Gasly, racing driver currently competing in Formula One with Alpine F1 Team
- Camille du Gast, race car driver
- Lucien Gaudin, fencer
- Fabien Gilot, Olympic and world champion swimmer
- Yoann Gourcuff, football player
- Antoine Griezmann, football player
- Stéphane Haccoun, boxer
- Rudy Haddad, soccer midfielder (Hapoel Ashkelon & U21 national team)
- Isack Hadjar, racing driver currently competing in Formula One with Red Bull Racing Team
- Alphonse Halimi ("la Petite Terreur"), world-champion bantamweight boxer
- Marlène Harnois (born 1986), taekwondo practitioner
- Thierry Henry, football player
- Bernard Hinault, cyclist
- Jaylen Hoard (born 1999), French-American basketball player for Hapoel Tel Aviv of the Israeli Basketball Premier League
- Pierre Houseaux, triathlete
- Cristobal Huet, hockey player
- Constant Huret, cyclist
- Olivier Jacque, motorcycle rider
- Rene Jacquot, boxer, underdog who became world champion
- Laurent Jalabert, cyclist
- Max Jean, Formula One driver
- Brian Joubert, figure skater
- Natan Jurkovitz (born 1995), French-Swiss-Israeli basketball player for Hapoel Be'er Sheva of the Israeli Basketball Premier League

=== K–Z ===
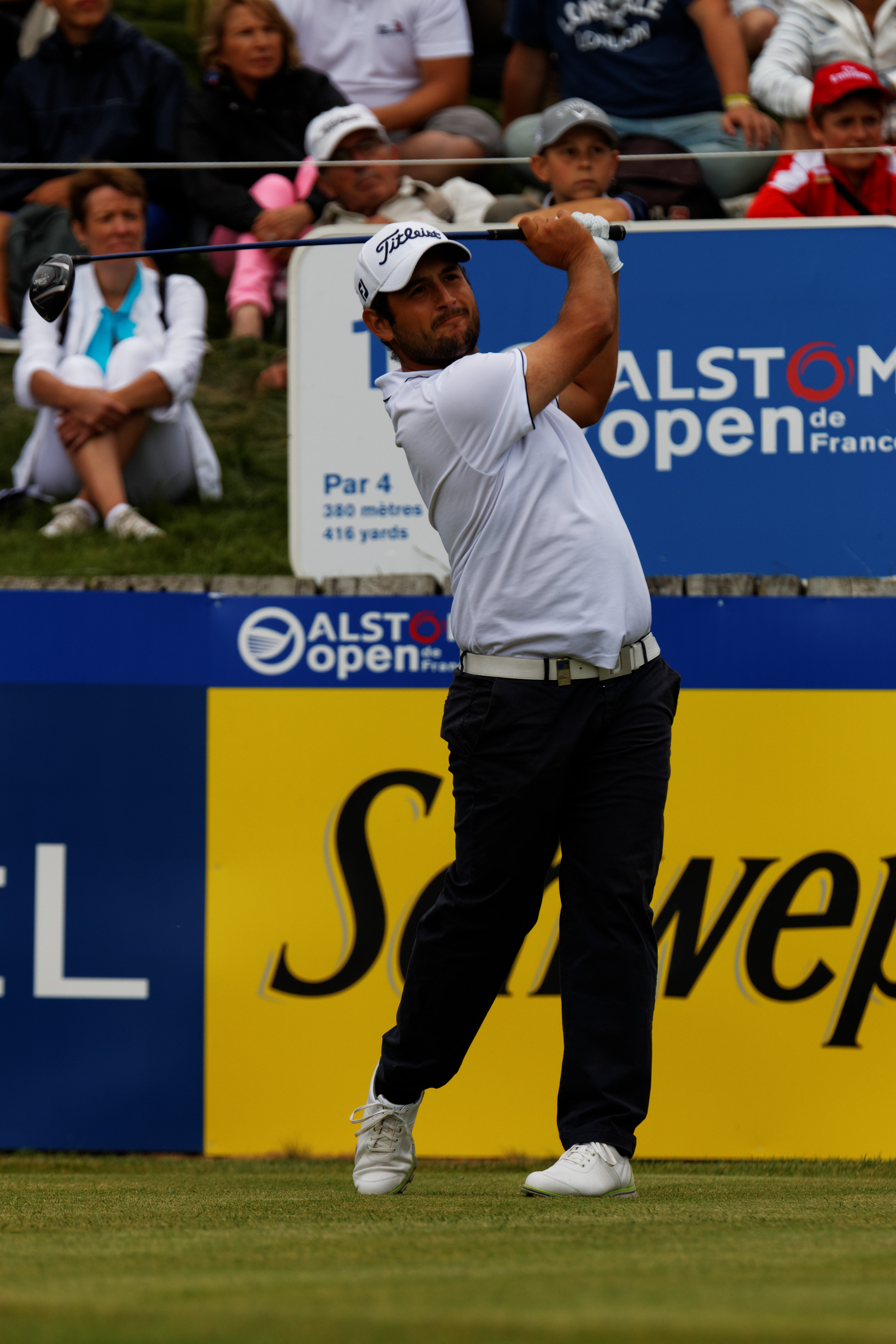
Alexander Lévy

- Tidjan Keita (born 1996), French-Guinean basketball player in the Israeli Basketball Premier League
- Jean-Claude Killy (born 1943), skier
- Raymond Kopa, football player
- Pascal Lavanchy, ice dancer (with Sophie Moniotte)
- Claude Legrand, skier
- Suzanne Lenglen, tennis player
- Alexander Lévy (born 1990), American-born professional golfer
- Alexandre Lippmann (1881–1960), épée fencer, two-time Olympic champion, two-time silver, bronze
- Bixente Lizarazu, football player
- Sébastien Loeb (born 1974), rally driver and nine-time champion
- Jeannie Longo, cyclist
- Mickaël Madar (born 1968), footballer
- André Mahé, cyclist
- Claude Makélélé, football player
- Laure Manaudou, swimmer
- Amélie Mauresmo, tennis player
- Jacques Mayol, freediver
- Kylian Mbappé, football player
- Jose Meiffret, cyclist
- Éric Millot, figure skater
- Alain Mimoun, athlete
- Sophie Moniotte, ice dancer (with Pascal Lavanchy)
- Carole Montillet, skier
- Armand Mouyal (1925–1988), épée fencer, Olympic bronze, world champion
- Moustapha N'Diaye (born 1984), basketball player
- Alfred "Artem" Nakache (1915–1983), swimmer, world record (200 m breaststroke), one-third of French two-time world record (3x100 relay team)
- Claude Netter (1924–2007), foil fencer, Olympic champion, silver
- Hellé Nice, pioneer female race car driver
- Joakim Noah, NBA basketball player (Chicago Bulls)
- Yannick Noah, tennis player
- Jacques Ochs (1883–1971), French-born Belgian artist and Olympic fencing champion
- Esteban Ocon, Formula One driver
- Sébastien Ogier, rally driver and nine-time champion
- Micheline Ostermeyer, Olympic champion in discus and shot put, bronze in high jump
- Frédéric Ouvret (born 1970), former professional footballer
- Simon Pagenaud, Indy car driver
- Tony Parker, Belgian-born French citizen, basketball player
- Gwendal Peizerat, ice dancer
- Marie-José Pérec, athlete
- Mary Pierce, Canadian-born French citizen, tennis player
- Stéphane Peterhansel, car and motor racer, nine-time Dakar Rally winner
- Julien Pillet, fencer
- Michel Platini, football player
- Alain Prost, Formula One driver and four-time champion
- Antoine Rigaudeau, basketball player
- Arthur Rozenfeld (born 1995), basketball player in the Israeli Basketball Premier League
- François Rozenthal (born 1975), ice hockey player
- Maurice Rozenthal (born 1975), ice hockey player
- Michel Sebastiani, modern pentathlete and Olympic fencing coach
- Georges Stern (1882–1928), jockey
- Jean Stern (1875–1962), épée fencer, Olympic champion
- Léon Théry, race car driver
- Marcel Thil, world-champion boxer
- Christophe Tiozzo, world-champion boxer; brother of Fabrice Tiozzo
- Fabrice Tiozzo, world-champion boxer; brother of Christophe Tiozzo
- David Trezeguet, football player
- Tristan Vautier, Indy car driver
- Patrick Vieira, Senegal-born French citizen, football player
- Richard Virenque, Morocco-born French citizen, cyclist
- Roger Walkowiak, cyclist
- Jean-Pierre Wimille, race car driver
- Albert Wolff (1906–1989), French-born American Olympic fencer
- Zinedine Zidane, football player

== Authors ==
=== A–E ===
- David Abbasi
- Carole Achache
- Marcel Achard
- Alain-Fournier
- Mathilde Alanic, novelist, short story writer
- Olivier Ameisen
- Alix André, romance novelist
- Jean Anouilh, 20th-century dramatist
- Guillaume Apollinaire
- Louis Aragon
- Marie Célestine Amélie d'Armaillé, writer, biographer, and historian
- Antonin Artaud
- Marcel Aymé
- Jean-Louis Baghio'o
- Honoré de Balzac, realist author
- Henri Barbusse
- Charles Baudelaire, 19th-century poet
- Pierre Beaumarchais, comedy playwright
- Simone de Beauvoir, 20th-century author
- Dany Bébel-Gisler
- Cyrano de Bergerac
- Jean Bernabé
- Georges Bernanos
- Tristan Bernard
- Maurice Blanchot
- Stella Blandy
- Antoine Blondin
- Nicolas Boileau
- Lucie Boissonnas, 19th-century author
- Jacques-Bénigne Bossuet
- Pierre Boulle
- Fernand Braudel
- André Breton
- Retif de la Bretonne
- Jean Anthelme Brillat-Savarin
- Michel Butor
- Marguerite de Cambis
- Albert Camus, existentialist author
- Marie-Magdeleine Carbet
- Louis-Ferdinand Céline, 20th-century author
- Blaise Cendrars
- Aimé Césaire, 20th-century poet
- Nicolas Chamfort
- Patrick Chamoiseau
- René Char, 20th-century poet
- Victorine Chastenay
- François-René de Chateaubriand
- Pierre Choderlos de Laclos
- Emil Cioran
- Fanny Clar, journalist and author
- Paul Claudel
- Jean Cocteau, 20th-century poet and playwright
- Colette, 20th-century author
- Henri Collomb, psychiatrist
- Joséphine Colomb, 19th-century children's writer
- Maryse Condé
- Raphaël Confiant
- Benjamin Constant
- Tristan Corbière
- Pierre Corneille, classicist playwright
- Marquis de Custine, travel writer
- Jean-Marie Dallet
- Joseph Dallois
- Myriam David, psychoanalyst
- Jeanine Delpech, journalist, translator, novelist
- Robert Desnos, 20th-century poet
- Gisèle d'Estoc, writer, sculptor, and feminist
- Charles Dezobry, historian and historical novelist
- Denis Diderot
- Clotilde Dissard, journalist and feminist
- Pierre Drieu La Rochelle, novelist
- Alexandre Dumas, père, author
- Alexandre Dumas, fils, playwright/author
- Marguerite Duras, 20th-century novelist
- Vanessa Duriès
- Paul Éluard
- Salvat Etchart

=== F–O ===
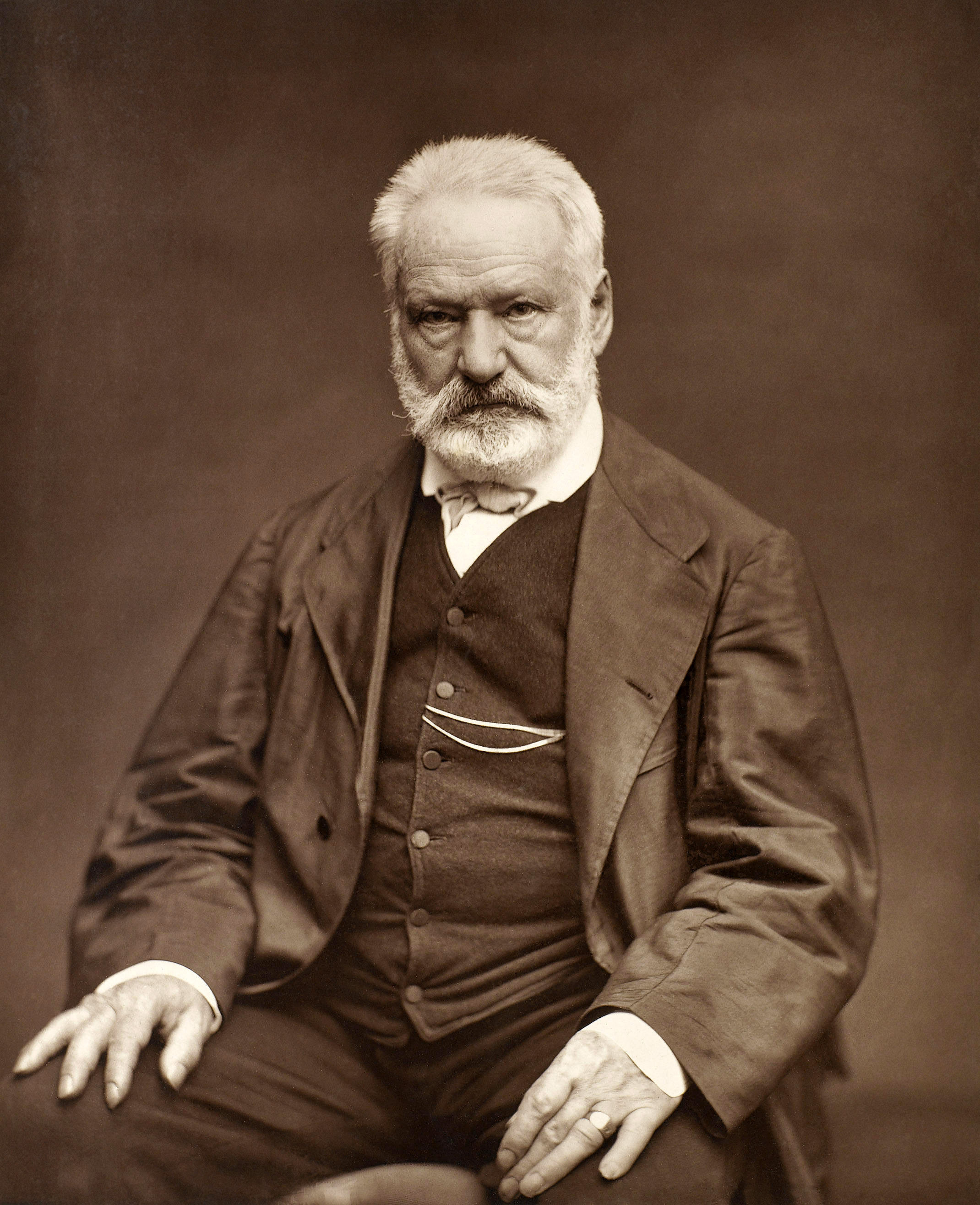
Victor Hugo

- Frantz Fanon, 20th-century author, psychiatrist
- Léon-Paul Fargue
- Georges Feydeau
- Marc Ferro
- Amanda Filipacchi, novelist (French and U.S. citizenship, writes in English)
- Alain Finkielkraut, essayist
- Gustave Flaubert, realist author
- Jean-François Fournel, lawyer
- Anatole France
- Marie de France, poet
- Romain Gary
- Jean Genet
- André Gide, Nobel Prize winner
- Jean Giono
- Jean Giraudoux
- Françoise Giroud
- Édouard Glissant
- Edmond de Goncourt, writer, critic, and founder of the Académie Goncourt
- Julien Gracq
- Julien Green
- Pierre Guyotat
- Nahema Hanafi, historian
- Jean-Edern Hallier
- Juliette Heuzey, novelist, biographer
- Auguste Himly, historian
- Victor Hugo, novelist, poet, and playwright
- Joris-Karl Huysmans
- Eugène Ionesco
- Martine L. Jacquot
- Marie-Reine de Jaham
- Alain Jouffroy, poet, art critic, plastician
- Fabienne Kanor
- Jean de La Bruyère
- Jean de La Fontaine
- Pierre Choderlos de Laclos
- Comte de Lautréamont (Isidore Ducasse)
- Leconte de Lisle, parnassian poet
- Alphonse de Lamartine
- Jacques Lacan, psychoanalyst
- Emmanuel Le Roy Ladurie, historian
- Paul Lafargue
- Jules Laforgue
- Valery Larbaud
- Maurice Leblanc, created Arsène Lupin
- Clotilde Leguil, psychoanalyst and philosopher, university professor
- Marie Léra, journalist, novelist, and translator
- Gaston Leroux, journalist and author, credited with creating the locked room puzzle mystery novel Le Mystère de la chambre jaune (The Mystery of the Yellow Room) and author of Le Fantôme de l'Opéra (The Phantom of the Opera)
- Pauline de Lézardière, 18th-century historian
- Stéphane Mallarmé, poet
- Hector Malot, 19th-century author
- André Malraux
- Matthieu Marais, 18th-century lawyer and writer
- Marcel Marceau, 20th-century mime (and member of the French Resistance in World War II)
- René Maran
- Pierre de Marivaux, playwright
- Clément Marot, poet
- Guy de Maupassant, novelist
- François Mauriac, Roman Catholic writer
- Daniel Maximin
- Prosper Mérimée, 19th-century novelist
- Catherine Millet, art expert, editor and erotic memoirist
- Patrick Modiano
- Jean Baptiste Poquelin dit Molière, 17th-century comedic playwright and actor
- Alfred de Musset, 19th-century poet
- Claire Julie de Nanteuil, 19th-century writer
- Gérard de Nerval
- Paul Niger
- Anaïs Nin
- Mona Ozouf, historian

=== P–Z ===
- Marcel Pagnol
- Gisela Pankow, psychoanalyst
- Ève Paul-Margueritte, novelist
- Lucie Paul-Margueritte, writer and translator
- Charles Péguy, 20th-century poet
- Charles Perrault, Mother Goose Tales
- Georges Perec
- Saint-John Perse
- Roger Peyrefitte
- Jean Piaget, psychologist
- Jean Piat
- Gisèle Pineau
- Christine de Pizan, historian, poet, philosopher
- Jacques Prévert, 20th-century poet
- Abbé Prévost
- Marcel Prévost
- Marcel Proust, novelist
- Raymond Queneau
- François Rabelais, Renaissance writer
- Raymond Radiguet
- Jean Racine, classicist playwright
- Pauline Réage, novelist
- Gabrielle Réval, novelist and essayist
- Arthur Rimbaud, symbolist poet
- Alain Robbe-Grillet
- Pierre de Ronsard
- Edmond Rostand, neo-romantic playwright
- Raymond Roussel
- Maximilien Rubel
- Marquis de Sade, erotic and philosophic author
- Charles Augustin Sainte-Beuve
- George Sand, feminist author
- Jean-Paul Sartre, 20th-century existentialist philosopher
- Nathalie Sarraute
- André Schwarz-Bart
- Simone Schwarz-Bart
- Pierre Seel, homosexual survivor of the concentration camps, activist, author
- Victor Segalen
- Madame de Sévigné
- Audrey Spiry
- Madame de Staël
- Antoine de Saint-Exupery, author and aviator
- Claude Simon
- Stendhal, novelist (born Henry Beyle)
- Alain Tasso, poet, painter, essayist, art critic, literary critic
- Raphaël Tardon
- Guy Tirolien
- François Truffaut, 20th-century filmmaker
- Paul Valéry, 20th-century poet
- Vercors, pseudonym of Jean Bruller
- Paul Verlaine, symbolist poet
- Jules Verne, novelist
- Boris Vian, 20th-century author
- Alfred de Vigny, 19th-century poet
- Auguste Villiers de l'Isle-Adam
- François Villon
- Voltaire
- Myriam Warner-Vieyra
- Marguerite Yourcenar
- Joseph Zobel
- Émile Zola, naturalist author

== Aviators ==
- Clément Ader
- Jacqueline Auriol
- Louis Blériot
- Henri Farman
- René Fonck
- Roland Garros, first to cross the Mediterranean; French Open is named after him.
- Georges Guynemer
- Raymonde de Laroche
- Hubert Latham
- Léon Lemartin
- Marie Marvingt
- Jean Mermoz
- Les Frères Robert, balloonists Anne-Jean Robert and Nicolas-Louis Robert
- Antoine de Saint-Exupéry, author and aviator
- André Turcat
- Gabriel Voisin

== Business ==
- Bernard Arnault (born 1949), entrepreneur
- Marie-Claude Beaud (born 1946), museumist
- Liliane Bettencourt, cosmetics
- Marcel Bich (1914–1994), Bic pens
- Vincent Bolloré (born 1952), transportation and engineering
- Marcel Boussac, textiles, fashion, newspapers, race horse breeding
- Anne Bouverot (born 1966), telecommunications business executive
- Ettore Bugatti (1881–1947), automobile manufacturer
- Christine Chanet (born 1944), lawyer and judge, long-term member of the United Nations Human Rights Committee
- André Citroën (1878–1935), automobile manufacturer
- Adolphe Clément-Bayard (1855–1928), transportation manufacturer
- Marcel Dassault (1892–1986), aviation
- Alexandre Darracq (1855–1931), automotive pioneer
- Claude Dauphin (1951–2015), commodities trader
- Pierre Dauzier (1939–2007), businessman, former president of Havas
- Louis Delâge (1874–1947), automotive pioneer
- Émile Delahaye (1843–1905), automotive pioneer
- Gérard Louis-Dreyfus (1932–2016), agricultural commodities
- Eleuthère Irénée du Pont de Nemours (1771–1834), founder of DuPont
- Pierre Samuel du Pont de Nemours (1739–1817), entrepreneur
- Jacques Foccart (1913–1997), import-export
- Léon Gaumont, pioneer film inventor
- Paul-Louis Halley (1934–2004), supermarket tycoon
- Max Hymans (1900–1961), aviation
- Jean-Marie Messier (born 1957), former Vivendi CEO
- Gérard Mestrallet (born 1949), chairman and CEO of Suez
- Gérard Mulliez, entrepreneur
- Xavier Niel (born 1967), entrepreneur and businessman at Iliad
- Charles Pathé, film industry pioneer
- Armand Peugeot (1849–1915), automobile manufacturer
- François Pinault (born 1936), entrepreneur
- Benoît Ramognino (born 1968), art dealer, design furniture and pop culture expert
- Jacques-Donatien Le Ray de Chaumont (1726–1803), shipping magnate and a "Father of the American Revolution"
- Marcel Renault (1872–1903), co-founder of automobile manufacturer Renault
- César Ritz, hotelier
- James Mayer de Rothschild (1792–1868), banker
- Philippe de Rothschild (1902–1988), winemaker
- Eva Sadoun (born 1980), social entrepreneur
- Jeanne de La Saulcée (died 1559), Lyon publisher, printer, bookseller
- Eugène Schueller (1881–1954), founder of L'Oréal
- Bernard Tapie (1943–2021), entrepreneur
- Pierre Vidoue (c. 1490–1543), Parisian printer and bookseller

== Chefs ==
- Raymond Blanc
- Paul Bocuse
- Daniel Boulud
- Michel Bras
- Pascal Caffet
- Marie-Antoine Carême
- Alain Ducasse
- Adolphe Dugléré
- Auguste Escoffier
- Pierre Gagnaire
- Michel Guérard
- Victor Hirtzler
- Marc Lanteri
- Ludovic Lefebvre
- Jacques Pépin
- Georges Perrier
- Fernand Point
- Charles Ranhofer
- Eric Ripert
- Joël Robuchon
- Albert Roux
- Michel Roux
- Michel Roux, Jr.
- Julien Royer
- Guy Savoy
- François Vatel
- Marc Veyrat
- Jean-Georges Vongerichten
- Philippe Etchebest
- Hélène Darroze
- Paul Pairet
- Michel Sarran

== Colonial administrators ==
- Félix Éboué, Governor General of French Equatorial Africa
- Pierre Savorgnan de Brazza, French Congo
- Antoine de la Mothe Cadillac, Louisiana
- Samuel de Champlain, New France
- François Caron, first Governor of French territories of India
- François Martin, Governor for French territories in India
- Pierre Christoph Le Noir, Governor for French territories in India
- Pierre Benoît Dumas, Governor for French territories in India
- Bertrand-François Mahé de La Bourdonnais, French naval officer and administrator, in the service of the French East India Company.
- Joseph François Dupleix, Governor for French territories in India
- Lally-Tollendal, Governor for French territories in India
- Marquis de Bussy-Castelnau, Governor for French territories in India
- Louis Faidherbe, Senegal
- Joseph Gallieni, Madagascar
- Francis Garnier, French Indochina (Vietnam, Cambodia, and Laos)
- Émile Gentil, French Congo
- Louis Hubert Gonzalve Lyautey, Algeria
- Jean-Baptiste Le Moyne de Bienville, Louisiana
- Jean Talon, Canada

== Comedians ==
- Alain Chabat
- Coluche
- Jamel Debbouze
- Pierre Desproges
- Raymond Devos
- Gad Elmaleh
- Florence Foresti
- Thierry Le Luron
- Dieudonné
- Elie Semoun
- Stef and Jim

== Craftspeople and inventors ==
- André Charles Boulle, cabinet maker
- Louis Braille, blind inventor
- Charles Cros, poet and inventor
- Paul Héroult, inventor
- Claude de Jouffroy d'Abbans, designed the first steamship in 1783
- René François Lacôte, luthier
- René Lalique, glass designer
- Marie-Anne Leroudier, embroiderer
- Auguste and Louis Lumière, inventors
- Yelken Octuri, industrial designer
- Benoît Raclet, inventor
- Philippe Starck, industrial architect and designer
- Franky Zapata, inventor of flyboard and flyboard Air

== Criminals ==
For collaboration with Nazi Germany see also the politicians section.

- Jacques de Bernonville (1897–1972), war criminal sentenced to death
- Jules Bonnot (1876–1912), gang member, bank robber and murderer
- Jérôme Carrein, child murderer, second last person to be executed by France
- Robert-François Damiens, attempted assassin of Louis XV
- Giuseppe Marco Fieschi (1790–1836), mass murderer and attempted assassin
- Léon Lacombe, anarchist burglar and murderer
- Olivier Levasseur, pirate
- Henri Désiré Landru, serial killer
- Émile Louis, suspected serial killer
- Jacques Mesrine, career criminal and fugitive
- Zacarias Moussaoui, al-Qaeda member
- Maurice Papon, politician and war criminal
- Marcel Petiot, serial killer
- Gilles de Rais, nobleman and serial killer
- Jean-Claude Romand, murderer
- Albert Spaggiari, bank robber
- Charles Sobhraj, serial killer and fraudster
- Paul Touvier, Nazi collaborator, one of only two Frenchmen to be convicted of crimes against humanity

== Dancers ==
- Josette Amiel
- Jane Avril
- La Goulue
- Sylvie Guillem
- Marcelle Lender
- Cléo de Mérode
- Claire Motte
- Antonine Meunier
- Jacqueline Moreau
- Hellé Nice
- François Perron
- Roland Petit
- Jeanne Schwarz
- Solange Schwarz
- Les Twins, Larry and Laurent Bourgeois

== Economists ==
- Antoine Augustin Cournot
- Maurice Allais, Nobel Prize
- Raymond Barre, economist and politician
- Frédéric Bastiat
- Fernand Braudel
- Alexandre Cazeau de Roumillac
- Jules Dupuit
- Gérard Debreu, Nobel memorial prize 1983
- Charles Gide
- Dominique Guellec
- Achille-Nicolas Isnard, political economist and engineer
- Jean-Jacques Laffont
- Pierre Émile Levasseur
- Alain Lipietz, green economist
- Bernard Maris
- Thomas Piketty
- Pierre Samuel du Pont de Nemours
- François Quesnay
- Pascal Salin
- Jean-Baptiste Say
- Jean Tirole
- Turgot
- Léon Walras

== Fashion ==
- Christian Audigier, fashion designer and business man
- Liliane Bettencourt, majority owner of L'Oréal, one of the wealthiest people in Europe
- Pierre Cardin, fashion designer
- Laetitia Casta, model
- Coco Chanel, fashion designer
- Jean-Charles de Castelbajac
- Hubert de Givenchy
- Inès de La Fressange, model and fashion designer
- Christian Dior, fashion designer
- Morgane Dubled, model
- Julien Fournié
- Jean Paul Gaultier
- Daniel Hechter, inventor of ready-to-wear
- Christian Lacroix
- Jeanne Lanvin, fashion designer
- Noémie Lenoir, model
- Christian Louboutin, shoe designer
- Iris Mittenaere, model, Miss France 2016 and Miss Universe 2016
- Jennifer Messelier, model
- Claude Montana
- Thierry Mugler
- Andre Oliver
- Paul Poiret
- Nina Ricci, fashion designer
- Sonia Rykiel
- Yves Saint Laurent, fashion designer
- Hedi Slimane
- Louis Vuitton, fashion designer

== Filmmakers ==
- Mona Achache
- Olivier Assayas
- Jacques Audiard
- Jacques Becker
- Jean-Jacques Beineix
- Luc Besson
- Yves Billon
- Alice Guy-Blaché
- Bertrand Blier
- Patrick Bokanowski
- Bertrand Bonello
- Martin Bourboulon
- Catherine Breillat
- Robert Bresson
- Laurent Cantet
- Yves Caumon
- André Cayatte
- Claude Chabrol
- Jean-Paul Civeyrac
- René Clair
- René Clément
- Henri-Georges Clouzot
- Jean Cocteau
- Romain Cogitore
- Fabien Cousteau
- Jacques Cousteau
- Jacques Demy
- Claire Denis
- Arnaud Desplechin
- Henri Diamant-Berger
- Abel Gance
- Jean-Luc Godard
- Michel Gondry
- Michel Hazanavicius
- Vanessa Filho
- Jean-Pierre Jeunet
- Mathieu Kassovitz
- Jan Kounen
- Hélène Lam Trong
- Patrice Leconte
- Claude Lelouch
- Philippe Lioret
- Teddy Lussi-Modeste
- Louis Malle
- André Malraux
- Georges Méliès
- Jean-Pierre Melville
- Maurice Pialat
- Jean Renoir
- Alain Resnais
- Jacques Rivette
- Yves Robert
- Éric Rohmer
- Jean Rollin
- Alain Sarde
- Claude Sautet
- Ramzi Ben Sliman
- Straub-Huillet
- Jacques Tati
- Jacques Tourneur
- Maurice Tourneur
- François Truffaut
- Roger Vadim
- Agnès Varda
- Flore Vasseur
- Jean Vigo

== Humorists ==
- Pierre Dac
- Cabu

== Musicians ==
=== A–J ===
- Dominique A
- Air (band)
- Alizée
- Charles Aznavour
- Josephine Baker, American-born entertainer
- Thomas Bangalter, member of Daft Punk
- Jane Bathori, opera singer
- Barbara
- Guy Béart
- Bénabar
- Carla Bruni
- Michel Berger
- Didier Bocquet
- Pierre Bouvier
- Lucienne Boyer
- Georges Brassens
- Breakbot
- Aristide Bruant
- Julie Budet
- Manu Chao
- Sébastien Charlier
- Matthieu Chedid
- Richard Clayderman, pianist
- Chuck Comeau
- Marie-Anne Couperin
- Dalida
- Damia
- Claude Debussy
- David Desrosiers
- Natalie Dessay, opera singer
- Dimitri from Paris
- Sacha Distel, heartthrob: covered "Raindrops Keep Fallin' on My Head"
- Marie Dubas
- Jacques Dutronc
- Kenza Farah
- Mylène Farmer
- Jean Ferrat
- Léo Ferré
- Nino Ferrer
- Thomas Fersen
- Claude François, popular singer during the 1960s and 1970s
- Fréhel
- Charlotte Gainsbourg
- Serge Gainsbourg
- France Gall
- Laurent Garnier
- Gipsy Kings
- Georgius
- Gesaffelstein
- Jean-Jacques Goldman
- Stéphane Grappelli, jazz musician
- Juliette Gréco
- Gribouille (born Marie-France Gaîté)
- Hélène Grimaud, classical pianist
- David Guetta, house-music producer and DJ
- Yvette Guilbert
- Arthur H
- David Hallyday
- Johnny Hallyday, born in Belgium, served in the French Army
- Françoise Hardy
- Jacques Higelin
- Guy-Manuel de Homem-Christo, member of Daft Punk
- Indila
- Sébastien Izambard, member of the quartet Il Divo
- IAM
- Joëlle
- Justice

=== K–Z ===
- Patricia Kaas
- Kaoma
- Kassav'
- Kavinsky
- Rina Ketty
- Kiki, "Queen of Montparnasse"
- La Goulue
- Larusso
- Boby Lapointe
- Bernard Lavilliers
- Maxime Le Forestier
- Sébastien Lefebvre
- Gérard Lenorman
- Nolwenn Leroy
- Lilly Wood and the Prick
- Claudine Longet
- Didier Lucchesi
- Sheryfa Luna
- M83
- Madeon
- Christophe Maé
- Mano Negra
- Luis Mariano
- Anna Marly
- Alain Marion
- Didier Marouani, musician and composer
- Mireille Mathieu
- Félix Mayol
- Miossec
- Mireille
- Mistinguett
- Philippe Muller
- Ginette Neveu
- Yannick Noah
- Claude Nougaro
- Vincent Niclo
- NTM
- Noir Désir
- Vanessa Paradis
- Pierre Perret
- Augustin Pesnon
- Michel Petrucciani
- Édith Piaf
- Michel Polnareff
- Lily Pons, opera singer (naturalized as a United States citizen in 1940)
- Rene Rancourt
- Renaud
- Tino Rossi
- Jean Sablon
- Sebastian
- David Serero
- Bob Sinclar
- Skip the Use
- Alain Souchon
- Mano Solo
- Jeff Stinco
- Sébastien Tellier
- Yann Tiersen
- Charles Trenet
- Christian Vander
- Sylvie Vartan
- Boris Vian
- Pauline Viardot, opera singer and composer
- Pedro Winter
- Zazie

== Philosophers ==
- Pierre Abélard
- Louis Althusser
- Raymond Aron, sociologist and philosopher
- Jean le Rond d'Alembert
- Gaston Bachelard
- Georges Bataille
- Roland Barthes
- Jean Baudrillard, philosopher and sociologist
- Pierre Bourdieu, sociologist
- Julien Benda
- Henri Bergson
- Louis de Bonald
- Émile Boutroux
- Fabienne Brugère
- Michel de Certeau
- François-René de Chateaubriand
- Auguste Comte
- André Comte-Sponville
- Jean de Crèvecœur
- Guy Debord
- Gilles Deleuze
- Natalie Depraz
- Jacques Derrida
- René Descartes, scientist and philosopher
- Denis Diderot, Enlightenment author and deist philosopher
- Frantz Fanon
- Michel Foucault
- Camille Froidevaux-Metterie
- Édouard Glissant
- Félix Guattari
- René Guénon
- Vladimir Jankélévitch
- Étienne de La Boétie, philosopher and politician
- Philippe Lacoue-Labarthe
- Félicité de Lamennais
- Henri Lefèbvre
- Marcel Légaut, Christian philosopher
- Jean de Léry, corsaire and ethnologist, anti-racism activist
- Emmanuel Lévinas
- Jean-François Lyotard
- Joseph de Maistre
- Nicolas Malebranche
- Gabriel Marcel, philosopher
- Jacques Maritain, philosopher
- Maurice Merleau-Ponty, phenomenologist
- Michel de Montaigne, philosopher essayist
- Montesquieu, political philosopher
- Edgar Morin
- Emmanuel Mounier, philosopher
- Jean-Luc Nancy, philosopher
- Blaise Pascal, scientist, mathematician, Christian philosopher, and author
- Juliette Rennes, sociologist
- Jean-François Revel
- Paul Ricœur
- Jean-Jacques Rousseau
- Jean-Paul Sartre, existentialist philosopher
- Michel Serres
- Hippolyte Taine
- Alexis de Tocqueville
- François-Marie Arouet (Voltaire), Enlightenment author, deist/agnostic philosopher
- Éric Weil, philosopher
- Simone Weil

== Politicians ==
- Manuel Aeschlimann, member of the National Assembly, mayor of Asnières-sur-Seine
- Robert Badinter, lawyer, statesman and anti-death-sentence activist
- François Bayrou, UDF party leader
- Léon Blum, politician, Socialist party leader, prime minister
- José Bové, anti-globalization activist, altermondialist
- Aristide Briand
- Émile Broussais
- Jacques Chirac, politician, member of center-right wing party, former city mayor of Paris, two-term French president
- Georges Clemenceau
- Gaspard de Coligny
- Bertrand Delanoë, mayor of Paris
- Jacques Delors
- Gootchaux Ettinger (1836–1917), French-Brazilian politician
- Félix Faure, President of France who died of a heart attack while making love to his mistress
- Charles de Gaulle, heroic World War II general, commander of the Free French Forces, French president
- Valéry Giscard d'Estaing
- François Guizot, Prime Minister
- Gisèle Halimi, lawyer and feminist activist
- François Hollande, former PS (Socialist Party) leader, former French president (15 May 2012 – 14 May 2017)
- Jean Jaurès, politician, pacifist
- Lionel Jospin, socialist, former prime minister
- Bernard Kouchner, founder of Médecins du Monde
- Jean-Marie Le Pen, leader of the extreme right party in France, Front National, presidential candidate
- Louis Lépine, Paris police chief, governor of Algiers, founder of the Concours Lépine
- Émile Loubet, President of France who was elected in 1899, after the death of Félix Faure
- Henri-Auguste Lozé, Paris police chief, senator of the Third Republic
- Emmanuel Macron, founder and current President of Renaissance, current President of France (from 14 May 2017)
- Jean-Paul Marat, politician during the Revolution, journalist, physician, scientist
- Jean-Claude Martinez, lawyer and European deputy
- Pierre Mendès France, lawyer and statesman, prime minister
- Honoré Mirabeau
- François Mitterrand, lawyer and statesman, president
- Jean Monnet
- Claude Panier, member of the National Assembly of France in 1956–1958
- Philippe Pétain, head of Vichy France
- Alexandre de Prouville, Viceroy of New France
- Marthe Richard
- Maximilien Robespierre, statesman and major figure in the French Revolution
- Gilberte Roca (1911–2004), Communist
- Jacques Rolland (1914–1999), politician
- Ségolène Royal, politician, Socialist party, presidential candidate
- Nicolas Sarkozy, politician, President of the right wing party
- Victor Schœlcher, anti-slavery activist
- Charles Maurice de Talleyrand
- Maurice Thorez
- Jacques Toubon
- Dominique de Villepin, former Prime Minister of France
- Dominique Voynet, physician and Green party politician

== Resistance workers ==
Resistance workers during the German military administration in occupied France during World War II

- Lucie Samuel-Aubrac (1912–2007), human rights activist
- Raymond Aubrac (1914–2012), statesman
- Robert Benoist (1895–1944), SOE operative, champion race car driver
- Denise Bloch (1915–1945), SOE operative: King's Commendation for Brave Conduct, Legion of Honor, French Resistance Medal
- Andrée Borrel (1919–1944), SOE operative: Croix de guerre
- Bernadette Cattanéo (1899–1963), trade unionist and communist activist
- Madeleine Damerment (1917–1944), SOE operative: Legion of Honor, Croix de guerre, Médaille combattant volontaire de la Résistance
- Marie Louise Dissard (1880–1957), U.S. Presidential Medal of Freedom recipient
- William Grover-Williams (1903–1945), SOE operative, champion race car driver
- Aimée Lallement (1898–1988), Righteous Among the Nations
- Cecily Lefort (1900–1945), SOE operative: Croix de guerre
- Pierre Mendès France (1907–1982), lawyer, statesman
- Jean Moulin (1899–1943), statesman
- Agnès de La Barre de Nanteuil (1922–1944), assisted allied airmen
- Abbé Pierre (1912–2007), priest and founder of Emmaus
- Christian Pineau (1904–1995), statesman
- Eliane Plewman (1917–1944), SOE operative: Croix de guerre
- Danielle Georgette Reddé (1911–2007), SOE operative: MBE, Croix de guerre, Légion d’Honneur
- Germaine Ribière (1917–1999), Righteous among the Nations
- Élise Rivet (1890–1945), nun executed by Nazis for aiding the resistance
- Lilian Rolfe (1914–1945), SOE agent executed by the Nazis
- Odette Sansom (1912–1995), SOE operative: George Cross, MBE, Legion of Honor
- Suzanne Spaak, Belgian-born agent: "Red Orchestra" intelligence network; executed 1944
- Violette Szabo (1921–1945), SOE operative: George Cross, Croix de guerre
- Jean-Pierre Wimille (1908–1949), SOE operative, champion race car driver
- See also French Resistance

== Social activists ==
- Hubertine Auclert, journalist and feminist leader
- Simone de Beauvoir, author, philosopher, and feminist
- Christian de Boisredon, social activist
- Geneviève de Brunelle, counter-revolutionary
- Sophie de Condorcet, feminist
- Maria Deraismes, feminist
- Camille Drevet, anti-colonialist, feminist and pacifist activist
- Marguerite Durand, journalist and feminist leader
- Anna Féresse-Deraismes feminist activist
- Olympe de Gouges, feminist
- Floresca Guépin, feminist and teacher
- Alice Jouenne, educator and socialist activist
- Samir Kassir, journalist
- Jean Théophile Victor Leclerc, radical revolutionist, newspaper publisher
- Marie Léopold-Lacour, feminist activist, writer, and storyteller
- Félix Pécaut, education proponent and pastor
- Gabrielle Petit, feminist activist, anticlerical, libertarian socialist, newspaper editor
- Élisabeth Renaud, teacher, socialist activist, feminist
- Colette Reynaud, feminist, socialist, pacifist, journalist
- Victor Schœlcher, abolitionist
- Pierre Seel, homosexual concentration camp survivor, activist, author
- Séverine, feminist
- Madeleine Tribolati (1905–1995), trade unionist
- Flora Tristan, feminist
- Jane Valbot, suffragist and pacifist

== Soldiers ==
- Joan of Arc, commander and saint
- Chevalier Bayard
- François Achille Bazaine
- Jean-Baptiste Bernadotte
- Georges Boulanger
- Thomas Robert Bugeaud
- Raymond H. A. Carter
- François de Charette
- Louis II de Bourbon, Prince of Condé, known as le Grand Condé.
- Gaspard de Coligny
- François Darlan
- Louis-Nicolas Davout
- Bob Denard
- Alfred Dreyfus
- Charles François Dumouriez
- Ferdinand Foch
- Louis Franchet d'Espèrey
- Joseph Gallieni
- Maurice Gamelin
- Henri Gouraud
- Bertrand du Guesclin
- Joseph Joffre
- Edmond Jouhaud
- Jean-Baptiste Jourdan
- Alphonse Juin
- Marie-Pierre Kœnig
- Jacques de la Palice
- Marquis de Lafayette
- Charles Leclerc
- Jean Lannes
- Jean de Lattre de Tassigny
- Philippe Leclerc de Hauteclocque
- François-Henri de Montmorency, duc de Luxembourg
- Hubert Lyautey
- Patrice MacMahon
- Charles Mangin
- Claude Martin
- André Masséna
- Jacques Massu
- Louis-Joseph de Montcalm
- Simon de Montfort
- Philippe Morillon
- Toussaint-Guillaume Picquet de la Motte
- Joachim Murat
- Michel Ney
- Robert Nivelle
- Philippe Pétain
- Comte de Rochambeau
- Raoul Salan
- Maurice Sarrail
- Nicolas Soult
- Louis Jules Trochu
- Henri de Turenne
- Étienne de Vignolles, called La Hire
- Claude Louis Hector de Villars
- Maxime Weygand

== Theologians ==
O.P. (Ordo Praedicatorum) is the abbreviation used to indicate that someone is/was a member of the Dominican Order, a Catholic religious order. S.J. (Societas Iesu) is the abbreviation used to indicate that someone is/was a member of the Society of Jesus, another Catholic religious order.

- Jean Arnauld, philosopher and theologian
- Denis Bérardier, priest and theologian
- Marie-Émile Boismard O.P.
- Jacques-Bénigne Bossuet
- Jean Calvin
- Sebastian Castellio, translator of the Bible
- Pierre Cauchon, condemned Joan of Arc
- Robert Ciboule, Roman Catholic theologian
- Bernard of Clairvaux
- Jean Claude
- Yves Congar, O.P.
- Reginald Garrigou-Lagrange, O.P.
- Hubert Languet
- Maurice Leenhardt, ethnologist, theologian
- Jean Louail, theologian
- André Paul, scholar in the fields of theology, biblical studies and ancient Judaism
- François Picquet, 18th-century missionary in New France
- Jean Porthaise, theologian
- Alexander de Rhodes S.J., 17th-century missionary to Indochina
- Richard of Saint-Laurent, canon at Rouen
- Auguste Sabatier
- Antonin Sertillanges O.P., founder of the Revue Thomiste
- Pierre Teilhard de Chardin S.J.
- Simon-Michel Treuvé

== Others ==
- Marie-Louise Arconati-Visconti (1840–1923), art collector, philanthropist
- Fabrice Balanche, geographer
- Christophe Balaÿ (1949–2022), professor, linguist, and translator
- Marcel Bardiaux, sailor
- Suzanne Borel, first French woman diplomat
- Charles Burlureaux, physician and psychiatrist
- Jean-Gérard Bursztein, psychoanalyst
- Jeanne Calment, title claimant for the longest documented human lifespan – 122 years and 164 days
- Pierre de Coubertin, initiator of the modern Olympic Games
- The Countess, transgender courtesan, demimondaine, singer, artist, and writer
- Jean Crépin, Army general
- François Louis Castelnaux Darrac, upholsterer
- Solange d'Ayen, noblewoman and journalist
- Ninon de l'Enclos, courtesan, patron of the arts
- Cavalier de la Salle, explorer
- Maurice Debesse, educator
- Suzanne Deutsch de la Meurthe, philanthropist, aviation supporter
- Eliot Deval, journalist, television presenter, and radio host
- René Dumont, agronomist engineer and sociologist and ecology activist
- Jules Dumont d'Urville, sea navy army and explorer
- Maurice Duverger, jurist
- Gustave Eiffel, engineer
- Pierre Charles L'Enfant, city planner responsible for Washington, D.C.
- Charles-Michel de l'Épée, founder of world's first public school for deaf people
- Norbert Ferré, illusionist
- Hervé Gattegno, journalist
- Robert Gloton, educator
- Arthur de Gobineau, diplomat, author of An Essay on the Inequality of the Human Races
- Lucie Grange, medium and feminist prophet
- Heldrad of Novalese, Benedictine monk and Catholic Church saint
- Marie de Hennezel, psychologist, psychotherapist and writer
- Jean Baptiste Marie Jaubert, physician and ornithologist
- Yann Kerr, electrical engineer
- René Lacoste, olympian tennis player and businessman, creator of the Lacoste tennis shirt
- Daniel Le Hirbec, navigator
- Louis Maurice Adolphe Linant de Bellefonds, explorer and canal engineer
- Marie-Antoinette Lix, governess and resistance fighter
- Brigitte Macron, high school teacher, first lady of France
- Virginie Mauvais, educator, philanthropist
- Léon Marchand, olympian athlete swimmer
- Carlos Mazure, engineer
- Philippe Méaille, contemporary art collector
- Montgolfier brothers, balloonists
- François Henri de la Motte, French spy executed for treason 1781 in London
- Nostradamus, physician, author, translator, astrological consultant
- Charles François Adrien le Paulmier, diplomat, nobleman, and slaveholder
- Anne Quemere, sailor and sportswoman
- Lucile Randon (1904–2023), supercentenarian and the 4th oldest known person in history
- Jean-Marie Raoul, lawyer, musician
- Élisée Reclus, geographer and anarchist
- Jean-François Ricard (born 1956), prosecutor of the French National Terrorism Prosecution Office
- Jean Eugène Robert-Houdin, magician, namesake of "Harry Houdini"
- Pierre Seel, homosexual survivor of the concentration camps, activist, author
- Odette Teissier du Cros (1906–1997), ethnologist, museum curator
- Vauban, engineer
- Eugène François Vidocq, French convict-turned-spy considered the father of modern forensics

== See also ==
- List of French Jews
- List of French people of immigrant origin
