= Christophe Balaÿ =

French linguist and translator (1949–2022)

- Born: 12 August 1949; France
- Died: 31 July 2022 (aged 72); Paris, France
- Citizenship: French
- Employer: Institut national des langues et civilisations orientales (inalco)
- Known for: Persian language and Iranian literature translator and professor

Christophe Balaÿ (12 August 1949 – 31 July 2022) was a French professor, linguist and translator known for his contributions to Persian language and Iranian literature.

== Biography ==
Balaÿ was born on 12 August 1949 in France. After earning his doctorate in French literature, he pursued a Doctorate of State in Letters, becoming a specialist in the Persian language and Iranian literature. During his time at the University of Nanterre, he wrote a thesis in comparative literature on Persian tales translated by the orientalist Petis de la Croix, entitled "Le sage et les Milles et un jours de F. Petis de La Croix", which he defended in 1979. Concurrently, Balaÿ trained in Persian at INALCO.

From 1979 to 1983, Balaÿ lived in Tehran as a researcher at the Institut Français d'Iranologie, a period marked by the Iran-Iraq war. Despite the challenging circumstances, he continued his research into modern Persian literature, resulting in a pioneering study of the short story genre in Iran. This work, which highlighted the role of the satirist chronicler Dehkhoda, was published in collaboration with Michel Cuypers under the title "Aux sources de la nouvelle persane".

Upon returning to France, Balaÿ embarked on a doctoral thesis under the supervision of Charles-Henri de Fouchécour, focusing on the Persian novel genre. He defended this thesis in 1988 and began teaching at INALCO the following year, succeeding his mentor, whom he regarded as his "master" throughout his life. Within a year, he published the first Persian textbook that incorporated the teaching of everyday language, "Manuel de persan, le persan au quotidien" with Hossein Esmaili, and "La genèse du roman persan moderne". This pioneering study was based on the prefaces to the most important novels of the late 19th and early 20th centuries.

Trained as a comparatist, he held prominent positions, including Professor of Persian at Institut national des langues et civilisations orientales (INALCO), Director of the Institut Français de Recherche en Iran, and Vice President for Research at INALCO.

Balaÿ returned to the Institut Français de Recherches en Iran to direct it from 1998 to 2003. Upon his return to France, he managed the Persian section at INALCO and became involved in the development of comparative literary studies and translation. He led a team of researchers in world literature and contributed to the creation of a Master's degree dedicated to these disciplines, LITTOR (2010-2014). Serving as Vice-Chairman of the Scientific Advisory Board alongside Gilles Delouche, Balaÿ headed the Doctoral School from 2010 to 2011, bringing his rigor and integrity to the research at INALCO until his retirement in 2014.

He published two significant books reflecting his dedication to sharing his experience: "Les Lectures persanes" in collaboration with Amir Moghani, which offered translations of extracts from the most significant texts of Iranian literature and a reflection on the evolution of this prose from the late 19th to the 21st century, and "La crise de la conscience iranienne. Histoire de la prose persane moderne (1800-1980)", the first history of modern Persian literature published in France, establishing a vital discipline in Iranian studies.

Balaÿ died on 31 July 2022.

== Major works ==
- Aux sources de la nouvelle persane (ADPF, 1983)
- La genèse du roman persan moderne (Ifri-Moïn, Tehran, 1998)
- Manuel de persan (L'Asiathèque, 1997)
- Lectures persanes (L'Asiathèque, 2015)
- La crise de la conscience iranienne. Histoire de la prose persane moderne (1800-1980) (Paris, Harmattan, 2017)

=== Translations ===
- Mahmoud Dowlatabadi, Le Colonel. Paris: Buchet-Chastel, 2012.
- Houshang Golshiri, Chronique de la victoire des mages, translation, notes, and afterword by Christophe Balaÿ. Paris: L’Inventaire, 1997. [Original title: فتحنامهٔ مغان]
- Houshang Golshiri [attributed to], Le Roi des noir-vêtus, translation from Persian, notes, and afterword by Christophe Balaÿ; preface by Reza. Paris: L’Inventaire, 2002.
- Sadegh Hedayat, L’Homme qui tua son désir: récits, translated from Persian by Christophe Balaÿ, Gilbert Lazard, and Dominique Orpillard. Paris: Phébus, 1998.
- Yadollah Royaï, Versées labiales, ed. Tarabuste, 2013.
- Yadollah Royaï, Signatures. Rennes: Dana, 2001.
- Zoyâ Pirzâd, Comme tous les après-midi. Cadeilhan: Zulma, 2007.
- Zoyâ Pirzâd, On s’y fera. Cadeilhan: Zulma, 2007; reissued by Librairie générale française, 2009.
- Zoyâ Pirzâd, Un jour avant Pâques. Cadeilhan: Zulma, 2008; reissued by Librairie générale française, 2010.
- Zoyâ Pirzâd, Le Goût âpre des kakis. Cadeilhan: Zulma, 2009; Paris: Hachette, 2012.
- Zoyâ Pirzâd, C’est moi qui éteins les lumières. Cadeilhan: Zulma, 2011; reissued by the same publisher, 2013.
