= Pierre Vidoue =

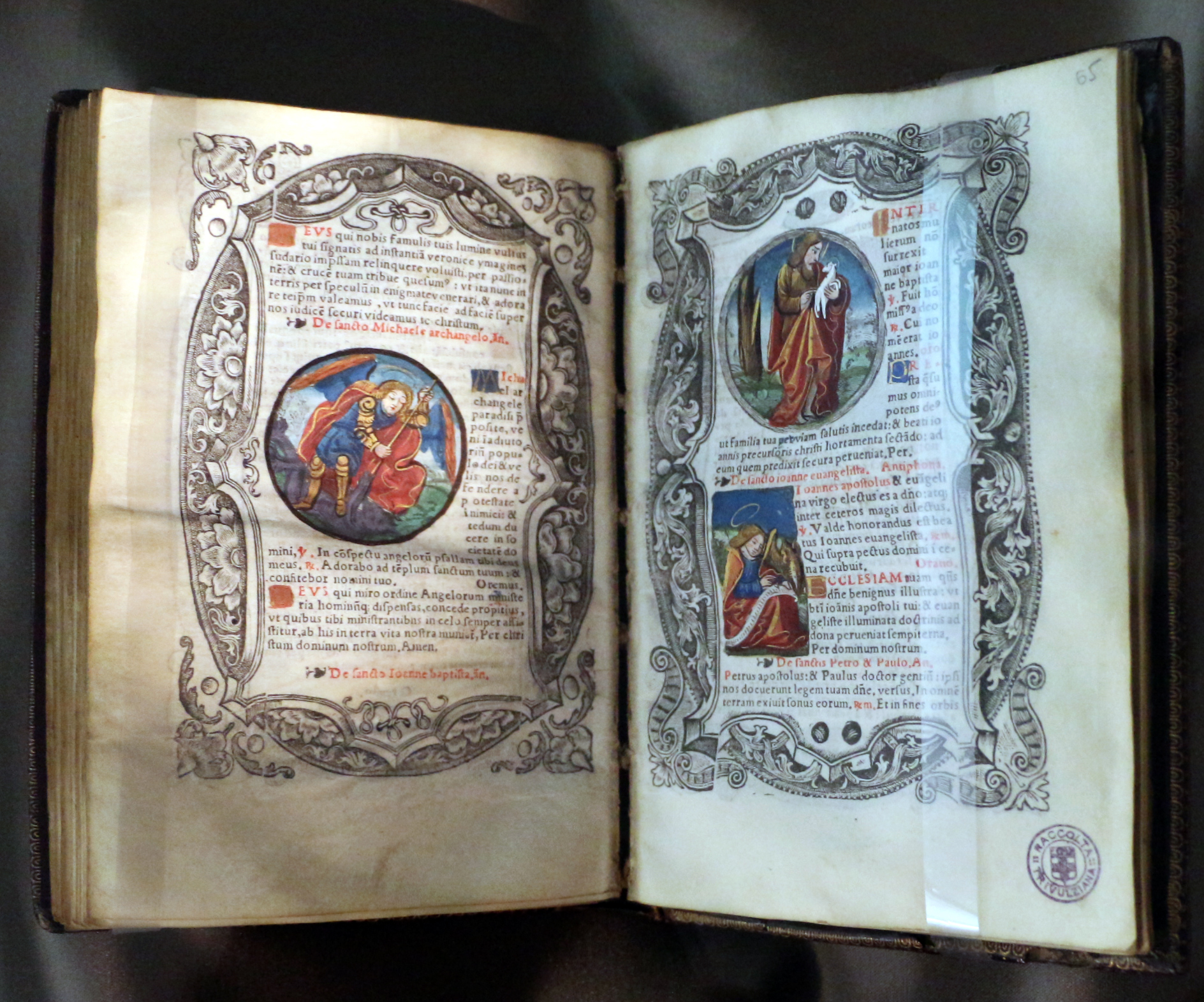
Book of Hours, May, printed by Guillaume Godard, Paris 1523. Biblioteca Trivulziana, Milan

Pierre Vidoue (c.1490–1543), was a Parisian printer and bookseller, active from 1516 to 1543; in his Latin books he called himself Petrus Vidouæus. He was succeeded by his wife Jeanne Garreau in 1544 and 1545; she then married the bookseller Estienne des Hayes.

Vidoue succeeded Pierre Viart as one of the libraires jurés of the University of Paris in 1523; in 1524 he became one of the gouverneurs of the Parisian book trade's social and religious guild, the confrérie of St John the Evangelist.

== Addresses ==
His address and shop sign were at various dates:

- Au Petit pont, in intersignio Cathedræ (on the Petit Pont, at the sign of the Chair); 1516
- Rue Perdue près la place Maubert; 1519 and 1528
- Au mont Saint-Hilaire / En la rue des Amandiers / Devant le collège de Reims; from 1531

== Motto and devices ==
His motto was Par sit Fortuna Labori (May good fortune be equal to my hard work). Several of his printer's devices included the figure of Fortune. They are illustrated in Renouard's Les Marques typographiques parisiennes des XVe et XVIe siècles:

- Renouard 1096
- Renouard 1097
- Renouard 1098

== Other compartments and marks ==
- Renouard 1099
- Renouard 1100
- Renouard 1101
