= Stef and Jim =

French comic duo

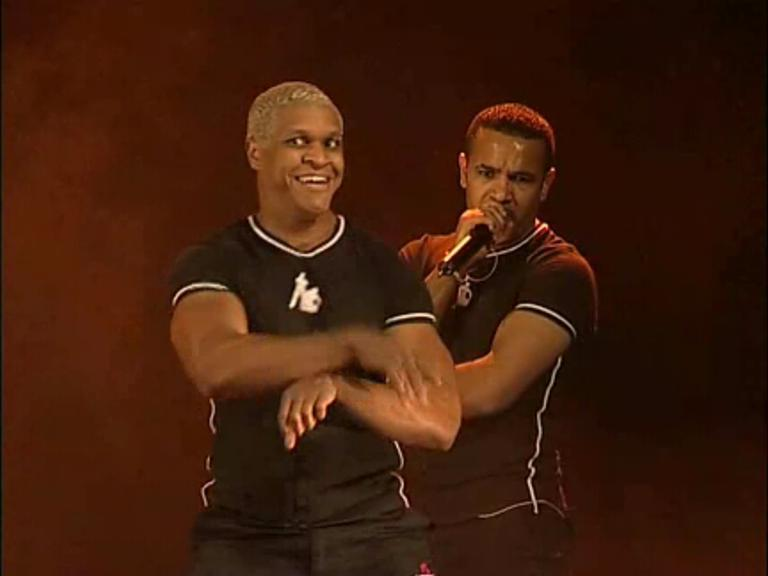
SteF'n JiM

SteF and JiM (SteF et JiM) are a French comic duo consisting of Stéphane Anglio (born 17 October 1977 in Albi, France) and Jimmy (born 3 May 1976 in Castres, France). The duo combines comedy, music, dance, and Human Beatboxing into a modern cabaret format.

== On stage ==
SteF and JiM have toured in France, Spain, Portugal, Italy, and Germany.

They created their first show, SteF and JiM on Stage, which opened for Anthony Kavanagh. They worked on stage with the French singer Matthieu Chedid. They won the "Show of the Year" award from the "Salon des artistes" at Bordeaux in 2007 AND 2009.

== On TV ==
SteF and JiM have had some of their sketches, as "The DJ", "The World Tour", and "The Cartoon", shown in Europe on TF1 and M6.

== Moulin Rouge ==
Since March 2007, SteF and JiM have been appearing at Le Moulin Rouge in Paris. They continue to work for cruises, casinos, and theaters in Europe.
