= Moustapha N'Diaye =

French basketball player

Moustapha N'Diaye (born July 12, 1984, in Paris, France) is a French basketball player who played for the French Pro A league club Nancy during the 2004–2005 season.
