= Madeleine Tribolati =

French trade unionist (1905–1995)

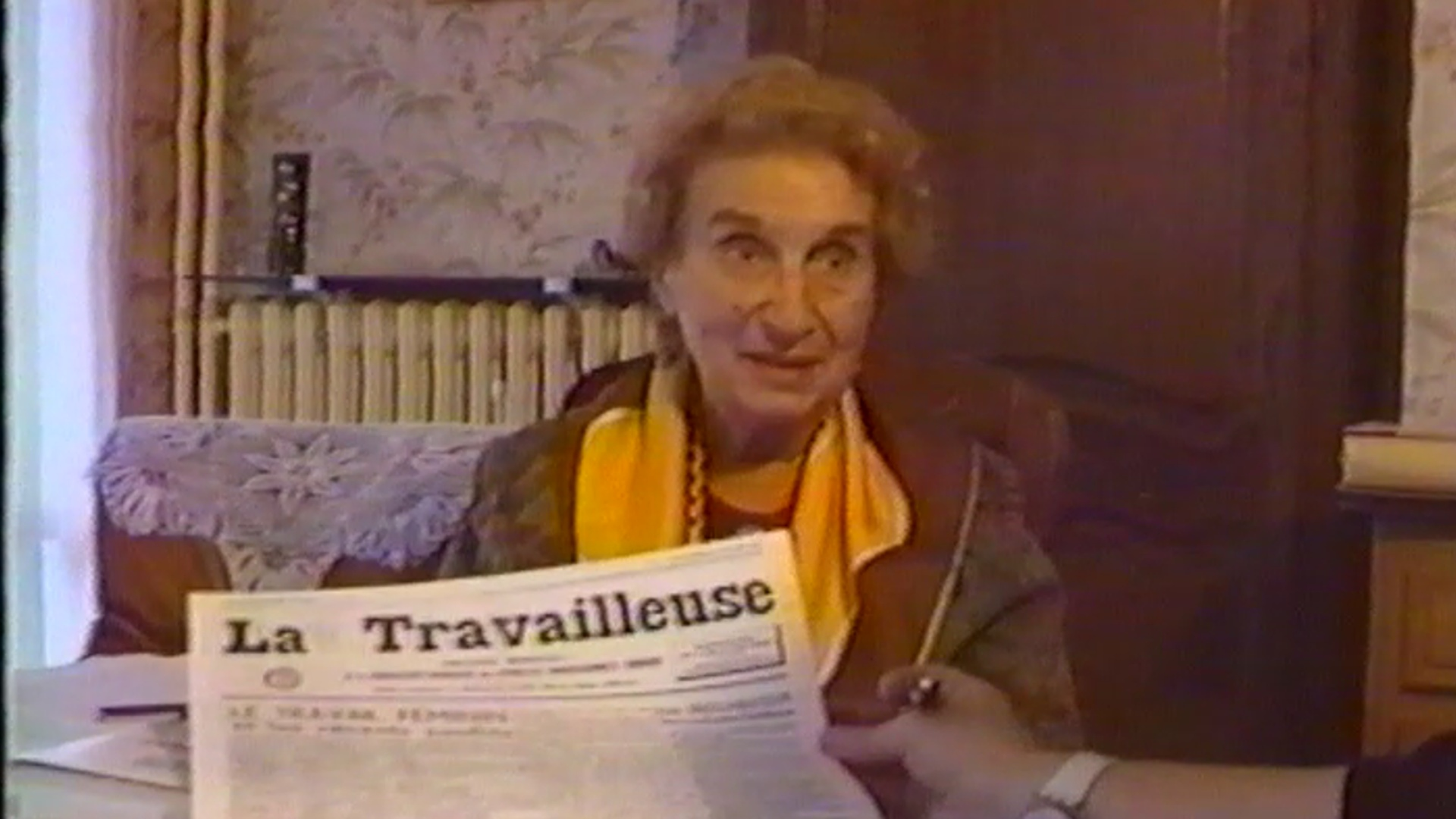
Madeleine Tribolati (1993)

Madeleine Tribolati (1905–1995) was a pioneering French trade unionist. She is remembered for her work during the 1936 negotiation of collective agreements, demanding equal professional rights for men and women and upholding the principle "for equal work, equal pay". After the Second World War, in 1946 she became deputy general secretary of the French Employees Federation (Fédération des Employés) and in 1948, vice-president of the French Confederation of Christian Workers (CFTC).

== Biography ==
Born in Paris on 23 March 1905, Madeleine Tribolati was the daughter of a labourer and a cleaning woman. Although she attended a secular state school, she became increasingly attracted to Catholicism. After starting to work when she was 13, she learnt about how women's trade unions offered women opportunities to defend their rights. In 1924, she joined the French Confederation of Christian Workers (CFTC) and attended a training course at the École Normale Sociale where over the next three years she learnt about church doctrine, labour law and trade unions with a view to entering the teaching profession (although she never did so).

In the late 1920s, she began to work as a shorthand-typist and in 1931 was elected to the board of the Union of Shorthand-Typists. She served as a youth delegate for the CFTC, chairing a number of youth meetings until 1935 when she joined the board of the Employees Federation. During this period, she contributed a number of articles to the union periodicals La Travailleuse and Syndicalisme, commenting on conditions for working mothers and housewives and emphasizing a woman's right to work with the slogan "à rendement égal, salaire égal" (for equal work, equal pay). Her conclusions were used in a report she presented to the women's meeting before the CFTC's 16th congress when they were taken into consideration.

Her success in convincing women delegates from the CGT to back her proposals on "the female condition" surprised the male delegates in view of the hostile relations between the CGT and the CFTC.

After the war, in 1946 she was once again elected as the Employees Federation's deputy general secretary and at the 14th congress of the CFTC in 1948, she became the organization's vice-president. In 1965, she again was elected vice-president of the CFTC, succeeding in obtaining generalization of supplementary pensions in 1972. She retired in 1975.

Madeleine Tribolati died in Paris on 25 October 1995.
