= Jean Baptiste Marie Jaubert =

French Physician and Ornithologist

Jean Baptiste Marie Jaubert (March 17, 1826 - August 9, 1884) was a French medical doctor and ornithologist.

== Life ==
He obtained his medical degree in Montpellier in 1849. He became a water inspector at the spa resort of Gréoux-les-Bains in 1852, where he worked for 24 years. He published a Guide to the waters of Gréoulx (sic) in 1857, which was reprinted several times.

In 1859, Jaubert published his book : Ornithological Richness of the South of France, or Description of all the birds observed in Provence and in the surrounding departments. The book is also signed by Christophe Jérôme Barthélemy Lapommeraye (1796-1869) but he does not seem to have really participated in its writing. Jaubert's collection is currently preserved by the Museum of Marseille.
