= Yelken Octuri =

French designer (born 1970)

Yelken Octuri is a French designer whose work includes aircraft design, product design, and furniture design. He designed a yacht to go in air and water. He is from France and works as a cabin designer for Airbus. Octuri was designated as one of the most innovative people of the year in 2011 by TIME magazine.

== Aircraft of the future ==
Octuri has created five types of futuristic aircraft:

- City planes
- Flagellum oscillator
- Flying yacht
- Honeymoon space shuttle
- Sailing aircraft

The yacht design includes a bullet shaped hull for travel through water and air, along with four 40 meter "towering" sails that fold down into wings. The yacht is 46 meters long with four masts. It was exhibited at the French Air and Space Museum.
