= Richard of Saint-Laurent =

13th-century French theologian

Richard of Saint-Laurent (died c. 1250) was a French theologian of the thirteenth century. He is thought to have been a canon at Rouen.

He is known for De laudibus beatae Mariae Virginis, a work printed by 1473, which is a long Mariale or work of praise for the Virgin Mary.
