= Jean Louail =

French theologian

Jean Louail (1668 – 3 March 1724) was a French theologian.
