= Joseph Dallois =

French jurist and literary critic

Joseph Dallois (1866? - 1889?) was a French jurist and a literary critic. He is most known for compiling the French Law into a repertoire and for his literary admiration of Lord Byron, particularly for having accomplished so much before dying at the age of 23.

== Literary criticism ==
Dallois considered Lord Byron to be the greatest of poets, describing him in such phrases as "the deepest of poets," "the lightest and the finest of spirits," "picturesque and colorist par excellence," and saying that he triumphs in the "all-powerful painting" of characters.

== Works ==
- Répertoire de législation et de jurisprudence forestières
- Études Morales Et Litteraires a Propos de Lord Byron
