= Benoît Raclet =

French inventor

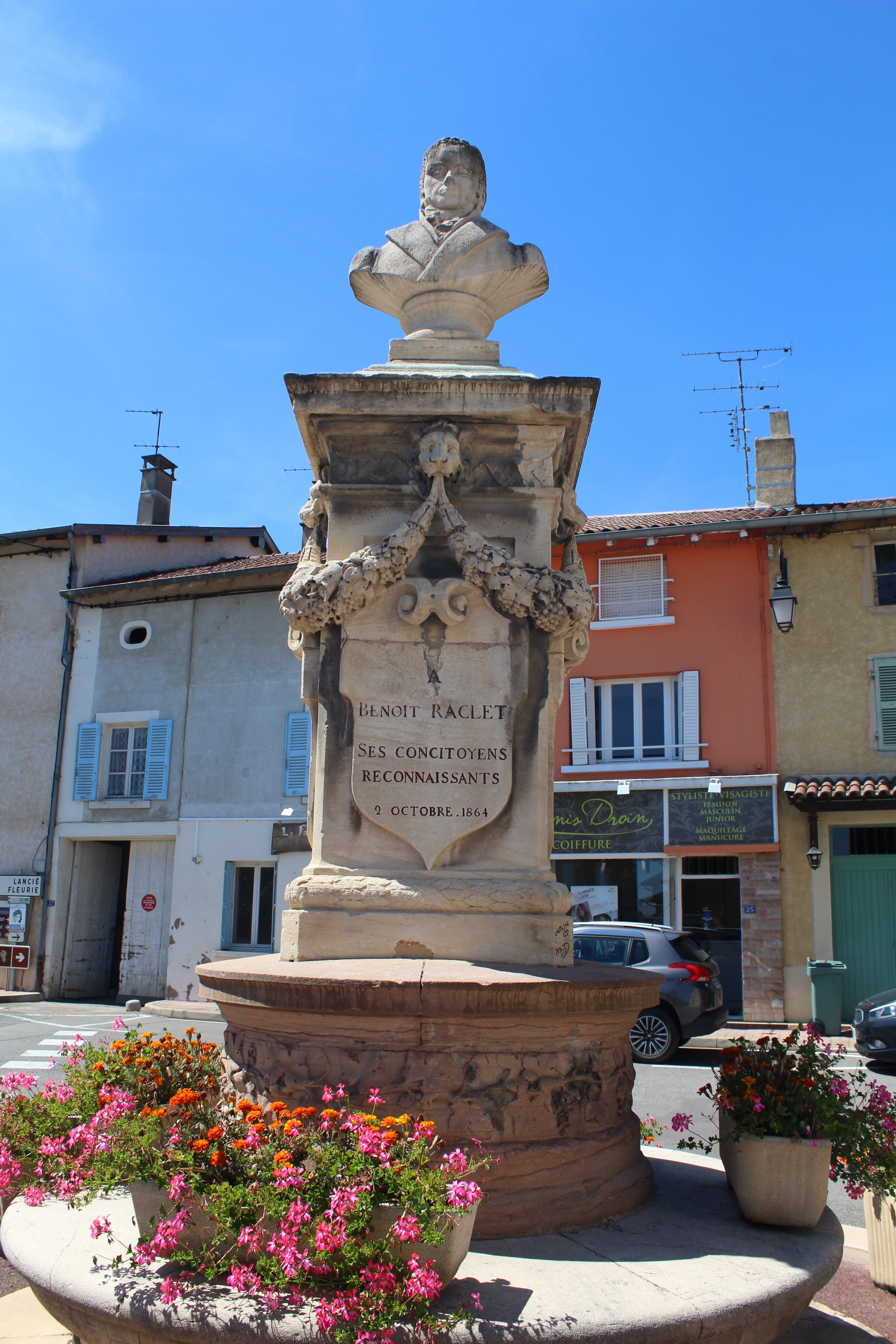
Benoit Raclet's monument

Benoît Raclet (1780–1844) was a French inventor who invented vine scalding. Raclet is credited with saving his country from disaster.

== Information ==
Raclet was born in Roanne, Loire, France in 1780. his father, Philibert, was a prosecutor. Raclet was one of nineteen children. He was later married and became a winery owner. His vine scalding technique was said to have prevented vine moths from destroying vineyards.

The Fête Raclet (Raclet Festival) is held every year in his honor in Romanèche-Thorins, Saône-et-Loire, France.
