= François Louis Castelnaux Darrac =

French upholsterer

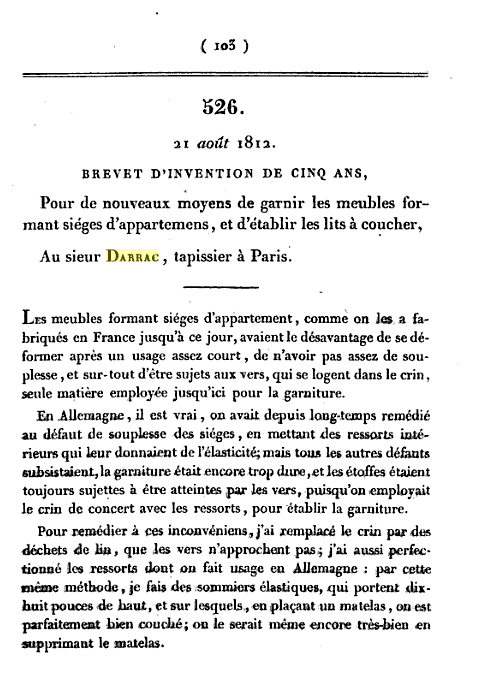

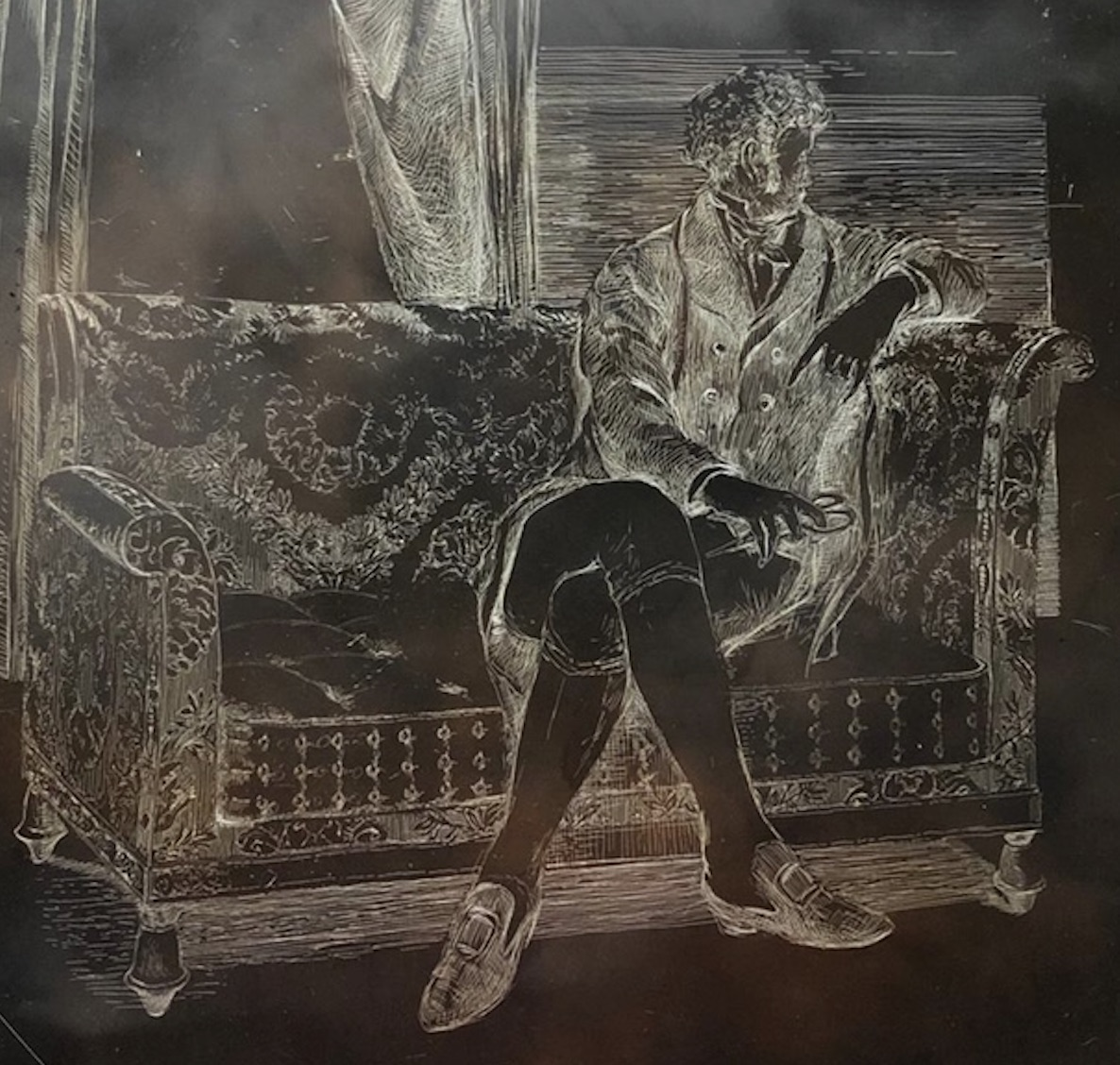

François Louis Castelnaux Darrac was a French master upholsterer who lived c. 1779 to 1862. Darrac was one of the most important upholsterers of his generation. He was upholsterer for the French Court. He was first an apprentice of Michel-Jacques Boulard (1761–1825). Darrac's work can be found in the Chateau de Versailles.

Darrac was also an inventor. In August 1812, he was granted a patent (Brevet d'invention) for five years for his new methods for upholstering furniture and his new method of producing a bed base.

Darrac got his idea for his patent in Germany, where upholstered chairs and sofas were fitted with metal springs. He adapted them into his chairs and bed bases, thus creating the "sommier élastique" (Eng:"Box-Spring") (French for bed base with elastic/spring suspension). The advantage of the bed base was that a much thinner mattresses could be produced, thus saving material. The bed base consisted of a combination of natural fillings and metal springs, thus enhancing the comfort. The invention initially saw limited commercial success, but it was later sold by a succession of several new owners under the name "Literie Darrac" in Paris, France. Darrac's invention was later perfected and used in mattresses fitted with a combination of natural comfort fillers and metal springs, thus creating the spring mattress. The brand was owned by the Veldeman Family (best known for the high-end luxury brand Fylds 1954) from Belgium and has been transferred recently to Revor Group also from Belgium.
