= David Abbasi =

Persian-French writer, journalist, and Islamologist

- Born: Paris, France
- Occupations: author, journalist, Islamologist
- Years active: David Abbasi, Siyavash Awesta, Persian: حسن عباسی
- Known for: Mithraic diary

David Abbasi, also known as Siyavash Awesta, is a Persian-French writer, journalist, and Islamologist. He lives in Paris and is the son of Zahra Mirzai and Sheikh Abbas Abbasi.

== Career ==
=== Media ===
Abbasi has been an announcer for the radio station "Ici et Maintenant" since 1986. In that time period, he has done more than 7000 hours of interviews and shows and interviewed several international personalities such as Jacques Chirac, Laurent Fabius, Daniel Gélin, Henri Caillavet, José Bové, Mehdi Bazargan, Castro, Pierre Henry, Pierre Marion, Ari Ben Menashe, Eli Barnavi, Enrico Macias, Général Paris, Jean Pierre Raffarin, and François Lebel. He also launched Mehr television in the year 2000.

=== Writing ===
Abbasi has written more than 100 books and 2,000 articles. In 1990, he invented the mitraic diary which he publishes each year. He has also written three books on this subject in multiple languages. He organized and produced more than 200 artistic programs, plays and festivals about the Eiffel Tower, Bois de Boulogne, Palais des congrès of Versailles, Théâtre de Paris, Casino de Paris, Theatre ADYAR, and Auditorium of Châtelet.

== Awards ==
- Mérite et Dévouement Français – 2003
- Arts-Sciences-Lettres – 16 September 2004 – Gold Plate
- Arts-Sciences-Lettres – 2007 Medal of Vermeil
- Grand Prix Humanitaire de France – 2007 – Gold Medal

Several international personalities have written articles in his favor, especially senator Henri Caillavet (father of the French modern laicity), who wrote a foreword for the book entitled "Women and Wars in Political Islam".
