= François Perron =

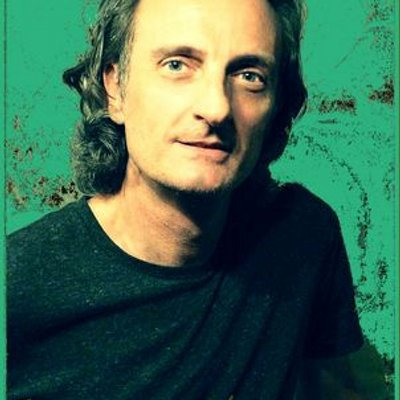
- Born: October 4, 1961 (age 65)
- Citizenship: American, French
- Education: Paris Opera Ballet School
- Children: 1
- Relatives: Lycette Darsonval (Aunt)
- Website: https://www.peridance.com/faculty/francois-perron

François Perron is a French ballet dancer, choreographer and teacher, who now works and resides in the United States. Perron is a graduate of the Paris Opera Ballet School where he studied under the direction of Claude Bessy. In 2011, Perron founded the French Academie of Ballet, based in New York City.

== Career ==
Before moving to the United States in 1984, Perron danced with La Scala in Milan, where Maurice Béjart invited him to Brussels as part of Les Ballets Du XXe Siecle. His first principal contract came in 1980 with the Northern Ballet Theatre of England, where he danced the entire classical repertoire, including Giselle and The Sleeping Beauty. A second principal contract followed from Ballet Du Nord and principal roles with the Joffrey Ballet and then he joined the New York City Ballet, where he danced for six years.

In 1993, he briefly danced with American Ballet Theatre and has since freelanced his talent. He has appeared with DanceGalaxy, Dances Patrelle, New York Theatre Ballet, Ruth Page's Nutcracker, Los Angeles Chamber Ballet, Ballet Concierto de Puerto Rico, and the Colorado Chamber Ballet and in several "Dance in America" programs. He served as Ballet Master for New York Theatre Ballet as well as for Florence, Italy's Maggio Danza.

In 1997, he accepted a full faculty position at Studio Maestro in New York City. In 2001 he became the Managing Artistic Director until 2008 when the school was renamed Manhattan Youth ballet and remained the Managing Artistic Director until 2011 when he left to create the French Academie of Ballet.

Perron is regularly invited to guest teach at major dance schools including Miami City Ballet, the Academy of Nevada Dance Theatre, St. Louis Ballet, Central Pennsylvania Youth Ballet, Point Park College (Pittsburgh) Summer Program and American Ballet Theatre's Young Dancer Summer Intensive.

Perron's first choreography was performed at Lincoln Center's Avery Fisher Hall for the New Year's Vienna Celebration performed by the New York Theatre Ballet. He also choreographed part of the second act in Northeast Ballet's The Nutcracker.

Perron has staged the Annual Spring Workshop Performance, including Giselle, Second Act; Sleeping Beauty, First Act; Paquita; Chaconne Pas de Trois by George Balanchine; Corsaire Pas de Deux; and Bluebird Pas de Deux. Private students have entered competitions with Perron's choreography, including the recent Youth America Grand Prix Gold Medalist in the Contemporary Category of the Boston and New York City competition. His private students have been accepted at the Paris Opera Ballet School and as company members at American Ballet Theatre, San Francisco Ballet and North Carolina Dance Theatre.

Perron also taught ballet at Eugene Lang College The New School for Liberal Arts, Jacqueline Kennedy Onassis School at American Ballet Theatre and is currently teaching classical partnering at Juilliard.

Perron was the coach, for the entire Broadway run, of the title role in Billy Elliot the Musical.

Perron is an ABT National Curriculum certified teacher (pre-primary to Level7) and an ABT Artistic Board of Examiner.

== Personal life ==
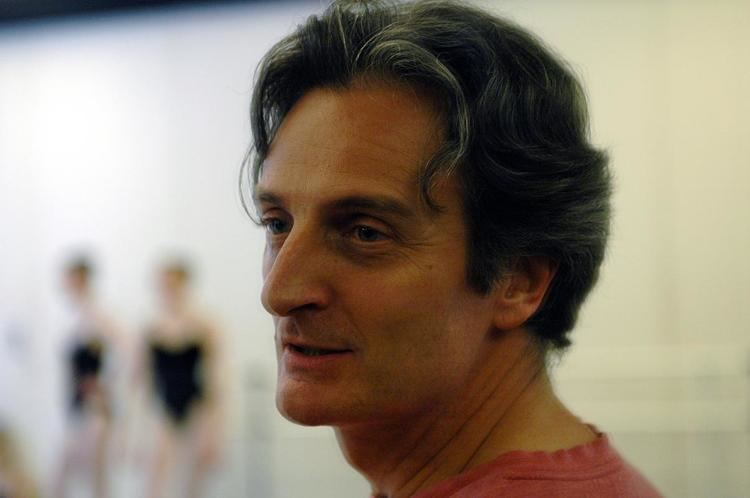
Francios Perron coaching the next generation of dancers.

Perron comes from a family of dancers: The title of "Etoile" was created for his aunt Lycette Darsonval (Premiere Danseuse étoile of the Paris Opera Ballet who was in the original cast of "Symphony in C" by George Balanchine. His uncle Serge Perrault was a principal with Roland Petit and his mother was part of the Paris Opera Ballet. Perron currently lives on the Upper East Side in New York City.
