= Benoît Ramognino =

French art dealer (born 1968)

- Born: Paris, France

Benoît Ramognino (born May 18, 1968, in Paris, France) is a notable figure in the field of art dealing, with a specialization in design furniture from the twentieth century, as well as expertise in pop culture and utopian architecture of the same era.

Benoît Ramognino promotes furniture of Quasar Khanh, Verner Panton Luigi Colani, and architecture by Matti Suuronen.

== Profession ==
An antiquarian since 1987, Benoît Ramognino attained the status of Expert CEA and CEFA in 2001 and has been a member of the Syndicat National des Antiquaires (SNA), the National Syndicate of Antiquarians, since 2005.

From 1987 to 1996, he operated his first boutique in Saint-Ouen, at the Clignancourt flea market, within the Paul Bert section, pioneering the "Baby Boom Plastic" trend by being the first merchant to offer furniture and toys from the 1970s at the Saint-Ouen flea market.

From 1996 to 2009, Benoît Ramognino served as the founder and director of XXO: Xtra Xtra Original. It emerged as a leading entity in the vintage furniture market, amassing one of Europe's most significant inventories of creations spanning from the 1960s to the 2000s. Noteworthy achievements include sales to prestigious institutions such as the Centre Georges Pompidou and the Musée des Arts Décoratifs, as well as participation in exhibitions such as the retrospective "Pop Design" at the Centre Georges Pompidou in 2004. Additionally, XXO was a pioneering participant in the "Puces du Design" event in 1999 and played a pivotal role in initiating the first auctions dedicated to design furniture. The company also demonstrated its commitment to preserving French design heritage by acquiring a substantial portion of available furniture stocks from French designers.

From 2009 to 2011, Benoît Ramognino served as a professor at EAC and directed theses, offering courses on the "design market" to students in the fourth year of their master's program.

In 2010, he acted as an expert for Joël Garcia Organization at the "Design Elysée" salon in Paris.

Between 2010 and 2014, he served as an official expert for Fabien Bonillo at the "Puces du Design" event in Paris.

During the same period, from 2010 to 2014, he held the position of director at Velvet Galerie, located at 11 rue Guénégaud, 75006, Paris, an establishment dedicated to the 20th-century "Pop Culture."

From 2013 to 2014, he organized auctions themed "1960-1980 Toy Generation" at Drouot and served as the director of the Pop Culture department at the Boisgirard-Antonini study.

In 2013, Benoît Ramognino inaugurated an exhibition space within a Futuro House at the Marché Dauphine in the Saint-Ouen Flea Market. The following year, in 2014, he was elected Vice President of CEFA, the expert chamber associated with SNCAO (National Union of Auctioneers and Experts in Art Objects).

== Curator ==
In 1998, Benoît Ramognino participated in the exhibition "THE INFLATABLE MOMENT: PNEUMATICS AND PROTEST IN '68" curated by Marc Dessauce and the Architectural League of New York, held at the Urban Center in New York City.

In 2000, he contributed to the "Air Air Show" exhibition at the Grimaldi Forum in Monaco.

In 2010, his private collection was showcased in the exhibition "A bout de souffle..!" at the Salon Design Elysées in Paris.

In 2012, he curated the exhibition "Quasar Khanh, pionnier du mobilier gonflable" at the Puces du Design 2012 event, held at Velvet Galerie/Galerie 47.

In 2014, Benoît Ramognino organized an exhibition at the Marché Dauphine flea market in Paris, featuring inflatable furniture by Quasar Khanh.

Benoît Ramognino is recognized as an expert by both the CEA and CEFA. Benoît Ramognino is also a member of the Syndicat National des Antiquaires (National Syndicate of Antiquarians).
