= Virginie Mauvais =

French educator, benefactor

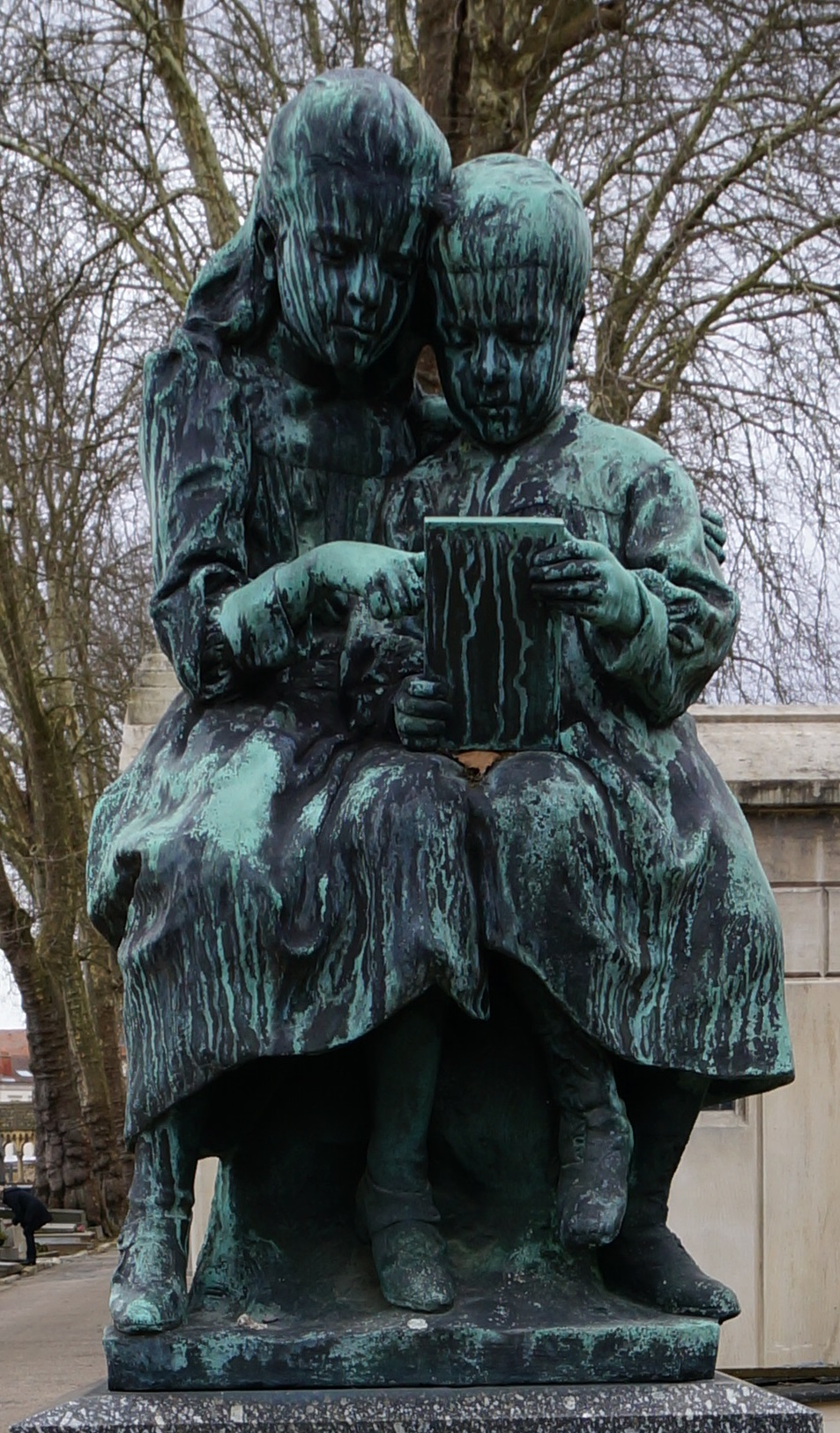
- Older student teaching younger one. (Funeral monument by Bussière))
- Born: 2 August 1797; Nancy, France
- Died: 27 June 1892 (aged 94); Nancy, France
- Burial place: Préville cemetery
- Occupation: Educator

Virginie Mauvais (2 August 1797 – 27 June 1892), French teacher and benefactor, was born and died in Nancy, France. She worked as a teacher and then an inspector of the Nancy municipal schools, and was a generous donor to the local hospital and other charities there.

== Biography ==
Her father was a constitutional priest and had married during the French Revolution so the family found itself in difficulty during the First Restoration when the French monarchy was restored to power. Her father was imprisoned and dependent on Virginie to plead his case to the Russian general who commanded Nancy, which, at the time, was occupied by the Russian Empire. She was successful. Her father went on to become a businessman.

Because Mauvais had been taught by her father, she could not read even at the age of 18. But after she earned her father's freedom, she traveled to Paris for instruction for three months. By that time, she had a teaching diploma and returned to Nancy to open a school for "young ladies of good society." Mauvais implemented a new type of teaching plan where older students would instruct younger ones. Six years later she was appointed her to an oversight position for Nancy schools.

Unhappy with the teaching texts at her disposal, she began co-authoring school books for her students to learn reading, writing and spelling. She went on to write several such books.

Virginie Mauvais devoted her life to teaching and was called at the time the “doyenne (dean) of public instruction." She was the tutor of botanist and scientist Émile Gallé. She never married, saying she found "the mission more beautiful to raise the children of others than those I may have had."

On the advice of one of her former students, a railway engineer, Mauvais invested in the railways of Portugal and made a fortune. She held 500,000 francs when she retired in 1852. On 18 March 1890, she gave 400,000 francs to the city of Nancy in exchange for a life annuity of 24,000 francs per year, and with the promise by the city to: build a hospital wing for the children of Nancy; erect a funeral monument in her honor; and to affix a commemorative plaque on her birthplace. She bequeathed the rest of her considerable fortune to the Nancy charity office.

Mauvais died in 1892 at 94 and was buried in the Place of Benefactors in Nancy's Préville cemetery.

== Legacy ==
- The children's pavilion of the Nancy hospital, built with her bequest, welcomed its first birth in 1894. It bore her name until 1982.
- Streets in Nancy, Tomblaine and Saint-Max were named after her.
- A commemorative marble plaque was placed on the façade of her birthplace, 70 Grande-Rue, Nancy.
- The funerary monument, a bronze statue by Ernest Bussière, represents two children reading, the elder guiding the younger.

== Select publications ==
- 1832: Vocabulaire de lecture, à l'usage des élèves de l'école-modèle de jeunes demoiselles (Reading vocabulary, for the use of the pupils of the model school of young ladies)
- 1834: Grammaire élémentaire à l'usage des élèves de l'école modèle de jeunes demoiselles (Elementary grammar for the use of the students of the model school for young ladies)
- 1834: Leçons graduées de lecture sans épellation et d'orthographe usuelle (Graduated lessons in reading without spelling)
- 1840: Leçons de géographie méthodique, à l'usage des écoles primaires (Lessons in methodical geography, for the use of primary schools)
- 1842: Leçons de lecture et d'orthographe pratique (Lessons in reading and practical spelling)
- 1853: Leçons graduées de lecture et d'orthographe, exercices et applications (Graduated lessons in reading and spelling, exercises and applications)
