= Christian de Boisredon =

French writer

- Born: 2 February 1974 (age 52); Saint-Germain-en-Laye, France
- Occupations: Journalist, Businessman

Christian de Boisredon (born 2 February 1974) is a French writer and social entrepreneur known for his contributions to the media field. He is the founder of Sparknews, a global network promoting positive journalism and impactful initiatives such as Impact Journalism Day and Solutions&Co. They were recognized as an Ashoka Fellow in 2014 for their work with Sparknews.

== The World Hope Tour ==
Christian de Boisredon was born in 1974. When he was 24, he travelled around the world, looking for men and women who were moving the world forward. After this “World Hope Tour”, the book written by Christian and his two travel companions (L’Espérance Autour du Monde, ed Pocket at Vivendi Universal Publisher) became a bestseller and was translated into several languages.

== Reporters d'Espoirs ==
While working as a consultant in strategy and change management in the consulting firm BearingPoint (ex Arthur Andersen), he co-founded in 2003 a social business, Reporters of Hope (Reporters d’Espoirs), and encouraged a large group of media CEOs (TV, Radio, Press and Internet...) to focus on solution-based information. The first event united important figures of the press at the headquarters of UNESCO with more than 1200 opinion leaders and more than 350 journalists and editors.

Christian de Boisredon passed on the presidency to Pierre Nougué and the managing role to a CEO in 2007 in order to focus on his other projects. Christian quit the board of the organization he created for strategy divergences.

== The Yunus Movie Project ==
In 2006, Christian de Boisredon co-founded a production company to produce a feature film based on the life of Professor Muhammad Yunus, inventor of Microcredit. Two months later, the latter won the Nobel Peace Prize. Phyllida Lloyd, the director of The Iron Lady (starring Meryl Streep) and Mamma Mia! (the biggest hit ever made by a female director and 5th biggest hit of 2008) is attached to the project as well as David Thompson, former head of BBC Films and Tessa Ross, head of Film 4 and coproducer of Slumdog Millionnaire among other films. The project is on stand by for political reasons in Bangladesh.

== Sparknews ==
In 2011, Christian de Boisredon created a social business start-up with a similar underlying philosophy to "Reporters d'Espoirs" but with an international approach. Sparknews started as a TV and press reports aggregator focused on solution based content. The site has been launched on May 31, 2012 at an event organized with the Global Editors Network, during the news World Summit, gathering 400 international editors in chief. Since then, Sparknews has created Impact Journalism Day where 50 leading newspapers from 4 continents publish together a supplement dedicated to solution based stories. The reach is 120 million readers and the news papers are Le Monde, The Sunday Times, La Stampa, the Times of India, Asahi Shimbun...

== Speaker ==
Christian frequently appears as a speaker in the media and at conferences: OECD, UNESCO, Global Entrepreneurship week, Danone, Leroy Merlin, BNP-Paribas, L'Oréal, EDF, Science-po, HEC, ESCP, etc.
