= Jean Porthaise =

French theologian

Jean Porthaise (1520–1602) was a French theologian. He was a member of the Franciscan League, and was known as an anti-Protestant polemicist, who preached and wrote tracts condemning protestantism.
