= Marcel Bardiaux =

French sailor (1910 - 2000)

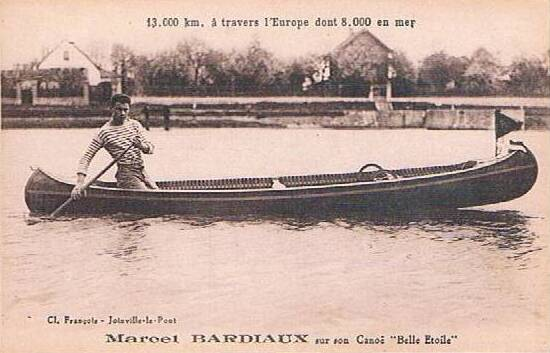

Marcel Bardiaux (2 April 1910 – February 2000) was a French sailor. He is the first solo sailor to have crossed Cape Horn from east to west (against the prevailing winds), in the middle of the (austral) winter of 1952 at the helm of a 9.38 m wooden sailboat, Les Quatre-Vents.
