= Tareq Abdesselem =

French Karateka

Personal information
- Nationality: French
- Born: 19 February 1987 (age 39) Marseille, France
- Occupation(s): Karateka, Head Coach
- Years active: 2005

Sport
- Country: France
- Sport: Karate
Medal record
Men's karate
Representing France
Silver medal – second place	2011 Karate 1 Premier League Istanbul, Cyprus	Kumite -84 kg
Silver medal – second place	2012 Karate 1 Nederlands	Kumite -84 kg

Tareq Abdesselem (born 19 February 1987) is an Olympic Head Coach and a former French Karateka champion. Tareq is the head national coach of team Olympic Kazakhstan for the 2021 Tokyo Olympics Games. He is also a former Thailand and Indonesia national head coach of the Karate team, and a former Athlete French national team. Under his coaching, the Kazakh karate team create a historical performance, by qualifying 5 athletes and winning two bronze medals at the 2021 Tokyo Olympics Games. The only team in the World to qualify complete Men Kumite Athletes in Tokyo.

== Career ==
Abdesselem was born in Marseille region, France on 19 February 1987. His first Karate match of event 32nd European Cadet & Junior Karate Championships happened in earlier 2005 in Greece. In 2013, The Thailand karate team under Abdesselem's coaching won the first-ever Southeast Asian Games (SEA) in the men's team event. And also, be among the Top 3 Asian Team at the 2015 Yokohama Asian Championships Seniors. The Indonesian team won 3 gold medals in the 2017 Southeast Asian Games (SEA) under Abdesselem's coaching. As an international athlete, Tareq Took medals at 3 World Karate Premier League and participated at Continental Championship, and World Championship, under the French National Team (FFK).
