= Charles Burlureaux =

French physician and psychiatrist

Charles Clément Burlureaux
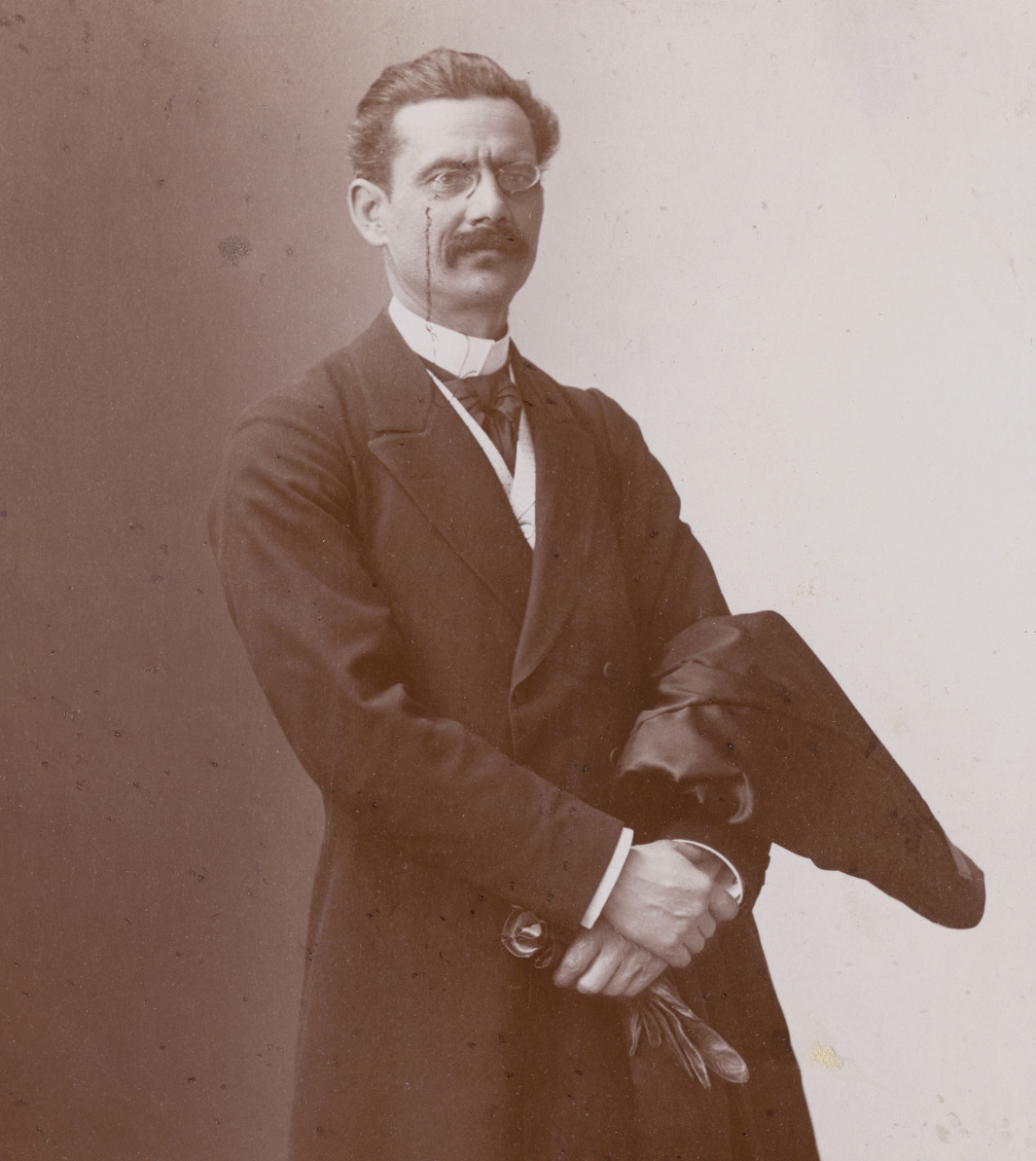
- Born: July 24, 1851; Dijon, France
- Died: January 18, 1927 (aged 75)
- Occupations: physician, psychiatrist
- Medical career
- Institutions: Val-de-Grâce
- Awards: Bréant Prize, Lefevre Prize from l'Académie de médecine, Chevalier of the Légion d'honneur

Charles Clément Burlureaux (1851–1927) was a French physician and psychiatrist. He also worked as an associate professor at Val de Grâce in Paris. Buruleaux was born in Dijon, France, on July 24, 1851, and died on January 18, 1927.

While at Val de Grâce, he designed an early perfusion apparatus to deliver solutes via perfusion and also studied using creosote oil injections as a treatment for tuberculosis. He was a medical officer, first class while at the hospital.

== Medical career ==
Burlureaux began his studies at the École impériale du Service de santé militaire de Strasbourg ("Imperial School of the Military Health Service of Strasbourg") in 1867, earning his MD designation in 1874. He wrote his thesis on paralytic madness among prostitutes and the role syphilis played in the pathogenesis of this disease. A similar article, published a few years later (in collaboration with another author) earned him the Lefevre Prize from l' Académie de médecine. He earned an associate professorship at Val de Grâce in Paris in 1889. Wanting the career freedom to study scientific problems, he left the army in 1894 to become a self-employed medical doctor. He moved to Paris and studied contagious diseases; a work on antisepsis and contagious diseases earned him the Stansky Prize from the Académie de médecine. He studied the use of creosote in the treatment of tuberculosis, cacodylic medications and "finally numerous scattered works devoted to the hygiene, therapy and treatment of cerebral affections, to sanitary and moral prophylaxis against venereal diseases, (showing) the complete measure of an active and fruitful career above all." He was a Member of the Medical society of hospitals, of the Dermatology Society and of the Therapeutic Society and of "several other learned associations", for which he was made a Chevalier of the Légion d'honneur.

=== Légion d'honneur ===
He was made a Chevalier of the Legion of Honor on January 23, 1901, and elevated to Officer on July 14, 1912. His file notes he died on January 18, 1927, living in Paris.
