= Daniel Le Hirbec =

French navigator

Daniel Le Hirbec (1621–1647) was a French navigator and compatriot of François Pyrard de Laval.
