= Charles François Adrien le Paulmier =

Diplomat, nobleman, and slaveholder

Charles François Adrien le Paulmier, le Chevalier d’Annemours (1742–March 1, 1809) was a diplomat, nobleman, and slaveholder from Normandy, France.

== Biography ==
Born in Normandy, France, the Chevalier d’Annemours spent much of his childhood in Martinique before going to England to study the English language. He returned to the West Indies in 1768 before exploring the English colonies in North America a few years later. He returned to France in 1774, and two years later began composing pamphlets about the American colonies, and in support of American independence. He was elected as a member to the American Philosophical Society in 1783.

In 1777 he returned to America, this time as a secret agent for France, making sure General George Washington was privy to his mission. He followed Congress around for the next two years, reporting what he observed back to France. Not long after, his intel contributed to the French decision to back the American cause, and the new French Minister Plenipotentiary appointed d’Annemours as French Consul-General at Baltimore (1778), and later to Virginia, Maryland, Georgia, and the two Carolinas (1779). He remained in that post until 1793, when a post-revolutionary France sent a new minister to control all French consular action in the United States, leaving d’Annemours without a job. Still, he remained in America, feeling more connected to it than post-Revolutionary France. He moved to New Orleans in 1796, leaving behind a large plantation there when he died.
