= Lucie Boissonnas =

French writer

- Born: Lucie Sophie Catherine Bessirard de La Touche; 20 April 1839; Paris, France
- Died: 3 May 1877 (aged 38); Arcachon, France
- Occupation: writer
- Spouse: Jean-Baptiste Boissonnas (m. 1858)
- Children: 6
- Writing career
- Pen name: Mme. B. Boissonnas
- Language: French
- Notable work: Une famille pendant la guerre
- Notable awards: Montyon Prize

Lucie Boissonnas (née, Bessirard de La Touche; pen name, Mme. B. Boissonnas; 20 April 1839 - 3 May 1877) was a 19th-century French writer. She was the recipient of the Montyon Prize in 1874 for Une famille pendant la guerre (1873). Boissonnas died in 1877.

== Biography ==
Lucie Sophie Catherine Bessirard de La Touche was born in Paris, 20 April 1839. She was the daughter of Charles-Alexandre Bessirard de La Touche, director of the Société des Papeteries du Marais et de Sainte-Marie.

In 1858, she married the Parisian banker Jean-Baptiste Boissonnas (1822-1897), with whom she had four sons and two daughters. Among her children were the diplomat and businessman, Jean-Baptiste Boissonnas (1870-1953), father of Éric Boissonnas, and the pastor Georges Boissonnas (1865-1942). She is the great-grandmother of Sylvina Boissonnas. Her husband was the brother of pastor Louis-Octave Boissonnas, as well as from the same family as the photographer, Frédéric Boissonnas.

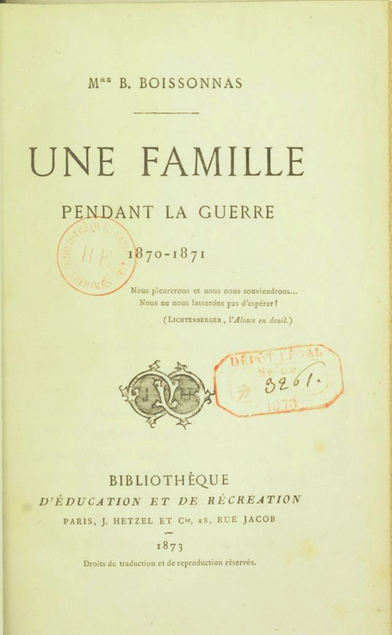
Une famille pendant la guerre, 1873

Un Vaincu, 1875

Boissonnas published two books with Hetzel editions; both used the name, "Mme. B. Boissonnas". The first, Une famille pendant la guerre (1873), was an epistolary account of her family's experience during the Franco-Prussian War of 1870. She received the Montyon Prize in 1874 for this work. The second, Un Vaincu (1875), was written when she was already suffering from tuberculosis, was a biography of General Robert E. Lee, whose daughters she knew.

She died 3 May 1877, of tuberculosis at the age of 38, in Arcachon.

== Awards ==
- 1874, Montyon Prize

== Publications ==
- 1873, Une famille pendant la guerre, Hetzel Ed.
- 1875, Un Vaincu, Hetzel Ed.
