= Robert Gloton =

French educator

Robert Gloton (1906–1986) was a French educator.
