= Yann Kerr =

French electrical engineer

Yann Kerr is an electrical engineer with the Centre National d'Etudes Spatiales (CNES) in Toulouse, France. He was named a Fellow of the Institute of Electrical and Electronics Engineers (IEEE) in 2013 for his contributions to two-dimensional L-band microwave interferometer design.
