= Institut Français de Recherche en Iran =

Iranian research institute

The Institut Français de Recherche en Iran (Persian: انجمن ایران‌شناسی فرانسه, romanized: Anjoman-e Irân-shenâsi-e Farânse) is a former archeological and historical institute located in Tehran, which is part of the cultural wing of the French embassy. It studied ancient Persian antiquities.

The French received exclusive rights to excavate in Iran for archaeological purposes in mid 19th century. However, after the rise of Reza Shah Pahlavi and the formation of the national museum in Tehran, the domain of the excavations of the French was limited to the ruins of Susa. At this capacity, the French expedition continued working until after the Islamic revolution and the Iran–Iraq War.

After the war, the French handed their headquarters at the Susa castle to the Iranian government and finished their archaeological field work. The remnants of the last expedition were reformed into the Institut Français de Recherche en Iran, which was headed by Rémy Boucharlat. Boucharlat has since left Iran.

It was shut down on January 5 by Iranian side as a protest against cartoons released in Charlie Hebdo.
