= Victorine Chastenay =

French writer (1771–1855)

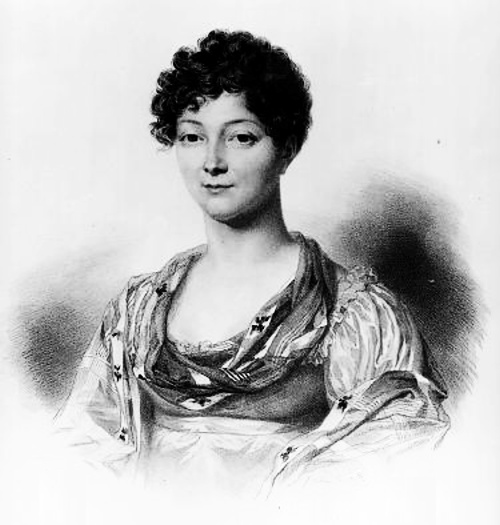
- Portrait of Chastenay
- Born: Louise-Marie-Victoire de Chastenay; 11 April 1771; Paris, France
- Died: 9 May 1855 (aged 84); Châtillon-sur-Seine, France
- Other name: Victorine de Chastenay
- Occupations: Writer, Translator, Memorialist
- Parents: Count Erard-Louis-Guy de Chastenay-Lanty (father); Catherine d'Herbouville (mother)
- Relatives: Henri-Louis Chastenay (brother)

Victorine Chastenay (1771–1855) was a French writer, essayist, translator and "mémorialiste". She is also known as Victorine de Chastenay.

== Biography ==
She was born Louise-Marie-Victoire de Chastenay on 11 April 1771 in Paris. Her mother, Catherine d'Herbouville, daughter of the Marquis d'Herbouville, had obtained a place at seventeen at the Palais-Bourbon, in the service of Mlle. d'Orléans; from that time she was educated at Panthémont Abbey with the princess, though she gave up her role shortly after her marriage. Catherine later became heiress to a significant fortune. Chastenay described her mother as possessing perfect manners and many talents. In 1770 Catherine married comte Erard-Louis-Guy de Chastenay-Lanty, scion of an ancient Burgundian family. Victorine describes him as possessing a joyful, generous and honest character. A son, Henri-Louis Chastenay, was born fifteen months after Victorine, in 1772.

Victorine spent her childhood in Paris. She describes her early childhood as dominated by a great love for her mother, while her father was often away with his regiment and on diplomatic business. She received an unusually high level of instruction and care for a young woman at the time. She was taken "with grammar, mathematics, geometry, algebra, physical and natural sciences, mythology, geography, Latin, German, English, Spanish, Italian and music, without neglecting drawing or dancing," though she had to give up drawing at the age of nine due to her weak eyes.

=== Canoness ===
As a young aristocrat of 14, Victorine's parents began proceedings to have her named the new abbess of the chapter of Epina. This was a coming of age event. At a formal ceremony in October 1785, the parents presented proof that their daughter was descended from French nobility on both the maternal and paternal sides, and Victorine was received into the noble chapter of Épinal. As the young Abbess, she took no vows and was not forbidden to marry, but, despite her unmarried status, she became entitled to be called Madame, a salutation ordinarily reserved for mature or married women. According to Trousson, the girl wasn't as impressed with the official ceremony and reception as she was by the ball that followed. "The ceremony," she said, "made me cry because Mom cried there; but the dance comforted me very quickly. I was suddenly the main and legal object; I had ball successes for the first time maybe, because I never danced very well or very badly." Her career as abbess was brought to an abrupt halt, however, when, on November 2, 1789, foretelling events of the coming French Revolution, the French National Assembly seized all ecclesiastical properties and possessions, and the chapter of Epinal was dissolved.

=== Revolutionary years ===
In 1792, as the French Revolution became violent, the Chastenays became terrified for their safety. In June they fled to Normandy and the city of Rouen; where Victorine's mother had a sister. However, the August and September massacres in Paris soon inspired the family to leave that place and hide in the old Abbey of Saint-Ouen nearby where they began a life of seclusion. There, while Victorine's mother nursed her fragile health and her father, wearing a carmagnole (a short jacket worn by French revolutionaries), went out to learn the latest news, she and her brother spent the time reading, drawing and enjoying the calm of the countryside. Still, the tranquility there could not dispel the fear that, at any moment, revolutionary violence would find them.

In April 1794, when those of noble birth were banned from staying in Paris and in maritime cities, the Chastenay family took refuge in Châtillon-sur-Seine, in the Burgundy region. But there, they learned that their pending residence certificate had not been received on time so Victorine's father was denounced as an enemy of the Revolution. With his son, he tried to escape enforcers by going to Switzerland through the woods.

When the authorities discovered that her father had already fled, they put Victorine in jail in retaliation and confined her dying mother to a hospital. Nineteen days later, her father was arrested and transferred on 14 July 1794 to the infamous prison, the Conciergerie, in Paris, where many French nobles were being held and many executed. With the arrest of her father, Victorine was released; she began a fervent letter writing campaign.

When her father finally went to trial, he was acquitted thanks to the efforts of the Revolutionary lawyer, Pierre François Réal, who had argued in his favor. By this time Réal had become the object of Victorine's affection, as she explained in her memoir.

"In 1800, I saw myself the object of a burning passion; whoever experienced it had from me all rights. Réal had been my father's defender in revolutionary court, savior of my brother's fortune and that of all my new family [that of her sister-in-law], I owed him everything, and my tender and deep friendship returned everything that my heart was allowed to experience."

=== Translations and writings ===
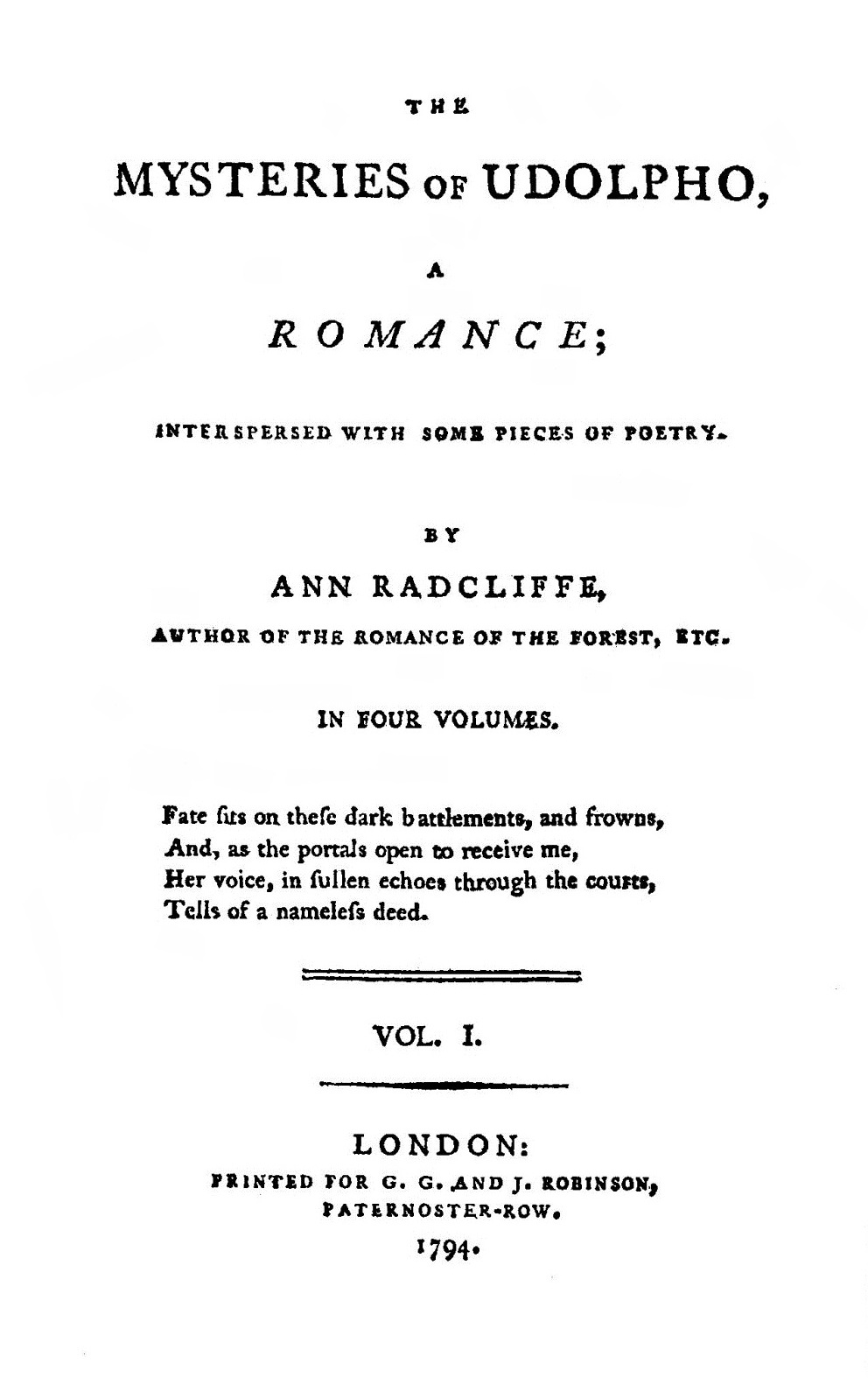
English text translated into French in 1797 by Chastenay.

According to Buck, Chastenay was "an accomplished musician, botanist and historian." Her translations to French from English included Oliver Goldsmith's The Deserted Village, (1770) and Ann Radcliffe's Mysteries of Udolpho (1794).

Her original works included two volumes of Calendar of Plants (1802–1803), where Chastenay combined her knowledge of botany with sentimental reflections. More scholarly works followed, including, On the Genius of Ancient Peoples (1808), Normans in Italy and Sicily... (1816) and From Asia (1833).

Chastenay's Memoirs, 1771-1815 described the tumultuous years of revolutionary terror as a member of the surviving French nobility.

=== Marriage opportunities ===
Victorine wrote in her memoirs that she had many serious suitors over the years but, as Edmond Biré, in the Universe, writesː "Madame de Chastenay had beauty, fortune, wit and talents. The contenders for her hand were not lacking and they 'weren't all to be despised.' She gave us a list of them in her memoirs." However, she didn't marry anyone and remained a single woman of independent means.

=== Isolation and death ===
From 1816, she lived primarily in Essarois, France in relative isolation. She had lost her father in 1830, mother in 1831 and brother in 1834. Near the same time, her dear friend Pierre-François Réal died. She became almost blind from cataracts in 1839 but had corrective surgery on one eye so she could continue writing her memoirs into old age.

She died 9 May 1855 at 84 years of age, at Châtillon-sur-Seine (Côte-d'Or). She is buried with her parents and brother in the choir of the Essarois church.

== Legacy ==
Joseph Joubert records a witticism of Chastenay's in his Pensées: "Madame Victorine de Châtenay disait de moi que j'avais l'air d'une âme qui a rencontré par hasard un corps, et qui s'en tire comme elle peut. Je ne puis disconvenir que ce mot ne soit juste." transl. Madame Victorine de Châtenay [sic] said of me that I seem like a soul that has encountered a body by chance, and that manages in this condition as it can. I can't deny that she speaks accurately.

== Selected works ==
According to worldcat.org, Chastenay's Memoirs, 1771-1815 was published in French in 24 editions between 1896 and 1987.

=== Translator ===
- The Abandoned Village, translated from the English poem by Olivier Goldsmith, Paris, Impr. by Réal, (1797)
- Les Mystères d'Udolphe, Paris, (1797)
- Secret memories to serve as the story of the end of the reign of Louis XVI by Bertrand de Molleville (this book was originally published only in English)

=== Author ===
- The Calendar of Flora or Studies of flowers from nature, Paris, Maradan, (1802) - (1803)
- From the Genius of the Ancient Peoples, or Historical and Literary Table of the Development of the Human Spirit in the Ancient Peoples, from Known Early Times to the Beginning of the Christian Era, Paris, Maradan, (1808)
- The Norman Knights in Italy and Sicily, and General considerations on the history of chivalry, and particularly in France on that of the chivalry of France, Paris, Maradan, (1816)
- From Asia or religious, philosophical and literary considerations on Asia, work composed and dedicated to M. le Baron Sylvestre de Sacy, Paris, Renouard-Dondey-Dupré, (1832)
- Memoirs of Madame de Chastenay, 1771-1815, Paris, Alphonse Roserot, Plon, (1896)
- Memoirs, 1771-1815: Two revolutions for one life, Paris, Tallandier, (2009)
