= Eva Sadoun =

French entrepreneur and activist

- Born: 30 August 1990; Boulogne-Billancourt, France
- Education: ENS Paris Saclay, Emlyon Business School
- Occupations: Entrepreneur, cofounder, activist
- Organization(s): LITA.co, Rift, Impact France Movement

Eva Sadoun (born 30 August 1990) is a French entrepreneur and activist.

== Biography ==
Sadoun was born in 1990 and grew up in Paris. She studied mathematics at the Paris-Nanterre University. After a few experiences in charity work, she then studied at Emlyon Business School with a major in finance and social impact measurement. She also studied philosophy at the Catholic Institute of Paris. In 2009, she created a non-profit company assisting with education in Togo, and worked for a microfinance company in India.

In 2014, she co-founded 1001pact, a social and environmental impact investing platform. 1001pact was renamed to LITA.co in 2017 and is currently based in France, Italy, and Belgium. In November 2020, she created the mobile app Rift, a LITA.co subsidiary.
