= Jacques Rolland =

French politician

Jacques Rolland (14 October 1914, Paris – 11 September 1999) was a French politician. He represented the Radical Party in the National Assembly from 1956 to 1958. Rolland was a friend of Emmanuel Levinas, introduced through a mutual acquaintance, the medievalist Bruno Roy; he wrote an introductory essay to the 1982 publication of Levinas's De l'évasion, entitled "Getting Out of Being by a New Path".

== Bibliography ==
- Silvano Petrosino, Jacques Rolland, La vérité nomade. Introduction à Emmanuel Lévinas, La Découverte, 1984
