= Frédéric Ouvret =

French footballer (born 1970)

Personal information
- Date of birth: 15 May 1970 (age 56)
- Place of birth: Paris, France
- Height: 1.82 m (6 ft 0 in)
- Position: Midfielder

Senior career*
Years	Team	Apps	(Gls)
1987–1992	Toulouse Fontaines		
1992–1993	Red Star		
1993–1994	Chamois Niortais	18	(0)
1994–1995	Toulouse Fontaines		
1995–1996	Mont-de-Marsan		
1997–2000	Toulouse Fontaines		
- * Club domestic league appearances and goals

Frédéric Ouvret (born 15 May 1970) is a French former professional footballer. He played as a midfielder.
