= Carlos Mazure =

Carlos Mazure from Soitec in Bernin, France was named Fellow of the Institute of Electrical and Electronics Engineers (IEEE) in 2013 "for leadership in the field of silicon on insulator and memory technologies".
