= Heldrad of Novalese =

Saint Heldrad of Novalese
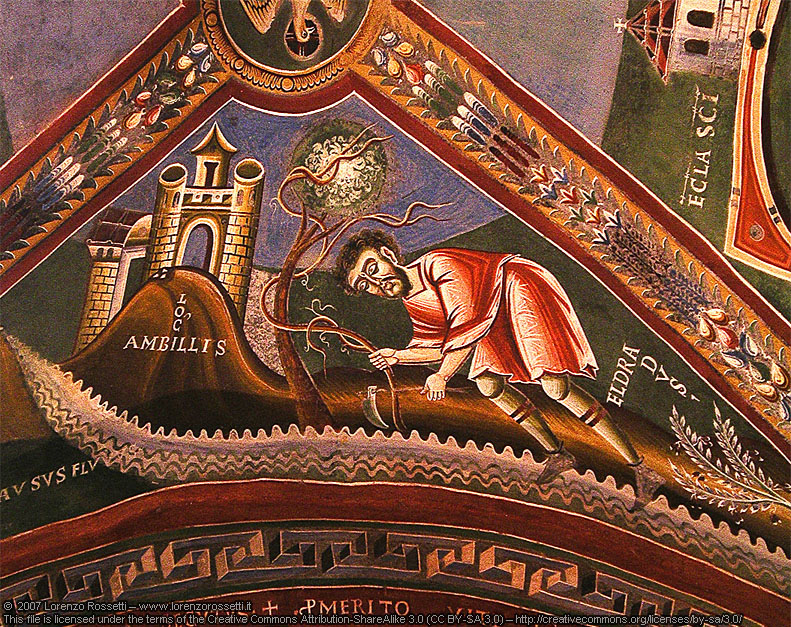
- Saint Heldrad of Novalese

Saint
- Died: c. 844
- Venerated in: Roman Catholic Church
- Feast: March 30
- Patronage: Novalese, farmers, monks (Benedictines)

Saint Heldrad of Novalese, also Eldardus or Eldrad (9th century – 844) was a French Benedictine monk, abbot of Novalese and saint of the Catholic Church.

The first records date back to his time at the Benedictine monastery in Novales. There, due to his zeal for work and prayer, he was elected superior of the monastery. He apparently held this position from 820 until his death.

== Veneration ==
A place of worship for Eldrad is Novalese, especially the chapel decorated with frescoes depicting scenes from the saint's life. In iconography, Eldrad is usually depicted with a habit and also a psalter, sometimes as a farmer, and less often as a pilgrim in Santiago de Compostela. He is the patron saint of village Novalese, farmers and monks, especially Benedictines.

His liturgical memory is celebrated on March 13.
