= Marine Renoir =

French film director, actress and model (born 1987)

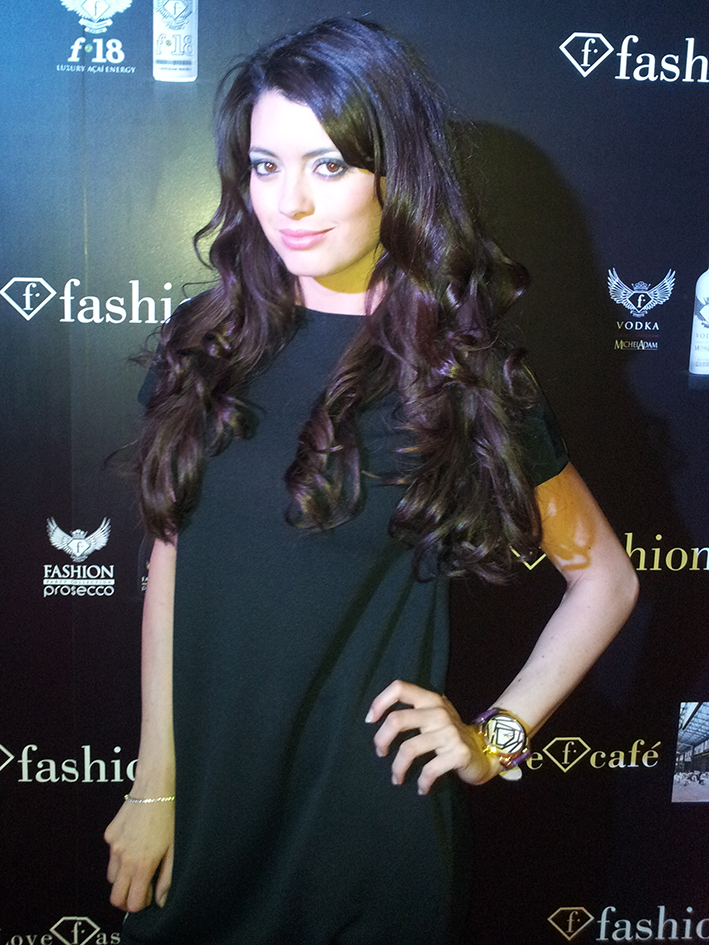
- Marine Renoir at Cannes Film Market in 2013
- Born: Marine Renoir; October 19, 1987 (age 37); Brest, France
- Occupation(s): Film director, Actress, Model
- Years active: 2008–present

Marine Renoir is a French film director, actress and model.

She was the Internet muse of Louis Vuitton in the video "Taxi Encounters" in 2011 and play the lead part in music video "Mens-moi" by singer Merwan Rim. Her first shortfilm "Cassandre" is released on july 2021.

== Filmography as actress ==
Year	Title	Role	Director
2012	Mens-Moi Music Video	Lead	Merwan Rim
2011	Spells	Lead	Martin Geisler
2011	Louis Vuitton - Taxi Encounters	Lead	Antoine Cayrol

== Filmography as director ==
Year	Title
2021	Cassandre
2023	Ma Voie/x
