= Marc Lanteri =

Michelin star chef

Marc Lanteri is a Michelin star chef, born in Tende, in the French Alps, currently residing in the Alba region of Northern Italy. He is the executive chef of Castello di Grinzane Cavour. Lanteri was awarded a Michelin star at Al Castello di Grinzane Cavour.

== Career ==
Lanteri began his professional career with Alain Ducasse at Le Louis XV in Monte Carlo. He subsequently joined Michel Rostang in Paris. After moving to Italy, Lanteri worked with Annie Feolde, Enzo Santin and Paolo Teverini. He then accepted the position of executive chef in 1998 at Delle Antiche Contrade in Cuneo, where he was awarded a Michelin star in 2004. In December 2008 Lanteri and his wife, sommelier and executive restaurant manager Amy Marcelle Bellotti, opened Il Baluardo in Mondovì. He was also awarded a Michelin star at Il Baluardo. Marc and his wife closed Il Baluardo in January 2015 so that they could open Marc Lanteri Al Castello in Grinzane Cavour. Lanteri was again awarded his Michelin star at Al Castello di Grinzane Cavour, where he continues to work with his wife and other professionals in a team-based approach to fine wine and cuisine. This historic castle in the Barolo wine-producing region of the Langhe was once home to the "architect" of the Unification of Italy, Camillo Benso, the Count of Cavour. The Grinzane Cavour castle has a long history dating back to the 1300s, and as of 2014 was included by UNESCO in the list of World Heritage sites. It contains a museum, an enoteca, meeting rooms, and a cafe as well as the Marc Lanteri Al Castello restaurant.
