= Pierre Dauzier =

French businessman (1939–2007)

Pierre Dauzier (31 January 1939 in Périgueux – 28 September 2007 in Paris) was a French businessman.

Dauzier was the president of Havas for 12 years, and left the company in 1998. He joined the company in 1963, when he was 24 years old.

== Biography ==
The son of farmers, he studied at Bossuet College in Brive-la-Gaillarde, then attended Henri-IV High School in Paris before pursuing university studies in Clermont-Ferrand and Paris, where he earned a bachelor's degree in law and literature. After studying literature, he joined Havas in 1963 as an advertising manager, with the support of his brother Jean-Marie, number two at Crédit Agricole and originally from Cornil, in Corrèze.

He climbed the corporate ladder, becoming Jacques Douce's chief of staff in 1968, then overseeing the establishment of Havas in the United States. He then established a network with the New York art scene, including Andy Warhol, John Lennon, and David Hockney.

The failure of this venture in North America did not hinder his progress within the group. He was appointed CEO of Havas Conseil in 1973, becoming its chairman in 1979. In 1982, André Rousselet succeeded Jacques Douce at the head of Havas and appointed Dauzier as CEO. He succeeded him in 1986 and organized the privatization of the group, then sought financial partners: Alcatel, later replaced by Vivendi. After Jean-Marie Messier group, later Vivendi, took control of the company, he was forced to resign in 1998 .

He was also president of the CA Brive, as well as the steering committee for France's image and the Sports Foundation. He was president of this sports foundation, a leading foundation in the world of sports, until 2007, the year he died and was succeeded by Pierre Rodocanachi.
