= Simon-Michel Treuvé =

French theologian

Simon-Michel Treuvé (8 August 1651 – 22 April 1730) was a French theologian.
