= Eszter Pap =

Hungarian triathlete

Eszter Pap (born 3 June 1993 in Budapest) is a Hungarian professional triathlete and European Championships bronze medalist of the year 2011. Since 2008 she has been a member of the Heraklesz high performance team.

== Sports career ==
In the Hungarian elite ranking called Ranglista Eszter Pap is number 10.

In 2011, Eszter Pap also takes part in the German elite circuit 2. Bundesliga (Nord) and represents EJOT Team TV Buschhütten. At the opening triathlon in Gladbeck (15 May 2011), Pap had the second best time and her team (Charlotte Morel, Mignon Vatlach, Scarlet Vatlach) placed first. At the second Bundesliga triathlon in Gütersloh (22 May 2011), Pap placed first in the individual ranking, and again her team won the gold medal.

At the 2011 European Junior Championships in Pontevedra, Pap won the bronze medal and together with Eszter Dudás, David Pap and Gabor Hanko she placed fourth in the Mix Relay.

In Hungary, from 2008 to 2010 Eszter Pap represented the club ORTRI, since 2011 she is part of the elite team of Triatlon Villám (Budapest) and attends the highschool Csik Ferenc Általános Iskola és Gimnázium.

Eszter's younger brother David and her elder sister Csilla also take part in ITU competitions.

== ITU Competitions ==
In the two years from 2009 to 2010, Eszter Pap took part in 9 ITU events and achieved 5 top ten positions, among which one gold and two silver medals. In 2011, she started the season with the European Cup gold medal in Vienna. The following list is based upon the official ITU rankings and the ITU Athletes's Profile Page. Unless indicated otherwise, the following events are triathlons (Olympic Distance) and refer to the Elite category.

Date	Competition	Place	Rank
2009-05-23	Duathlon European Championships (Junior)	Budapest	2
2009-06-06	Junior European Cup	Vienna	11
2009-07-02	European Championships (Junior)	Holten	29
2009-08-08	Junior European Cup	Tiszaújváros	6
2009-09-26	Youth Olympic Games Qualifier	Mar Menor	9
2010-06-12	Junior European Cup	Vienna	11
2010-08-29	European Championships (Team Relay Youth)	Vila Nova de Gaia (Porto)	1
2010-09-08	Dextro Energy World Championship Series, Grand Final: Junior World Championship	Budapest	18
2010-09-08	Aquathlon World Championships (Junior)	Budapest	2
2011-06-11	Junior European Cup	Vienna	1
2011-06-24	European Championships (Junior)	Pontevedra	3
2011-06-26	European Championships (Junior Mix Relay)	Pontevedra	4

== Gallery ==
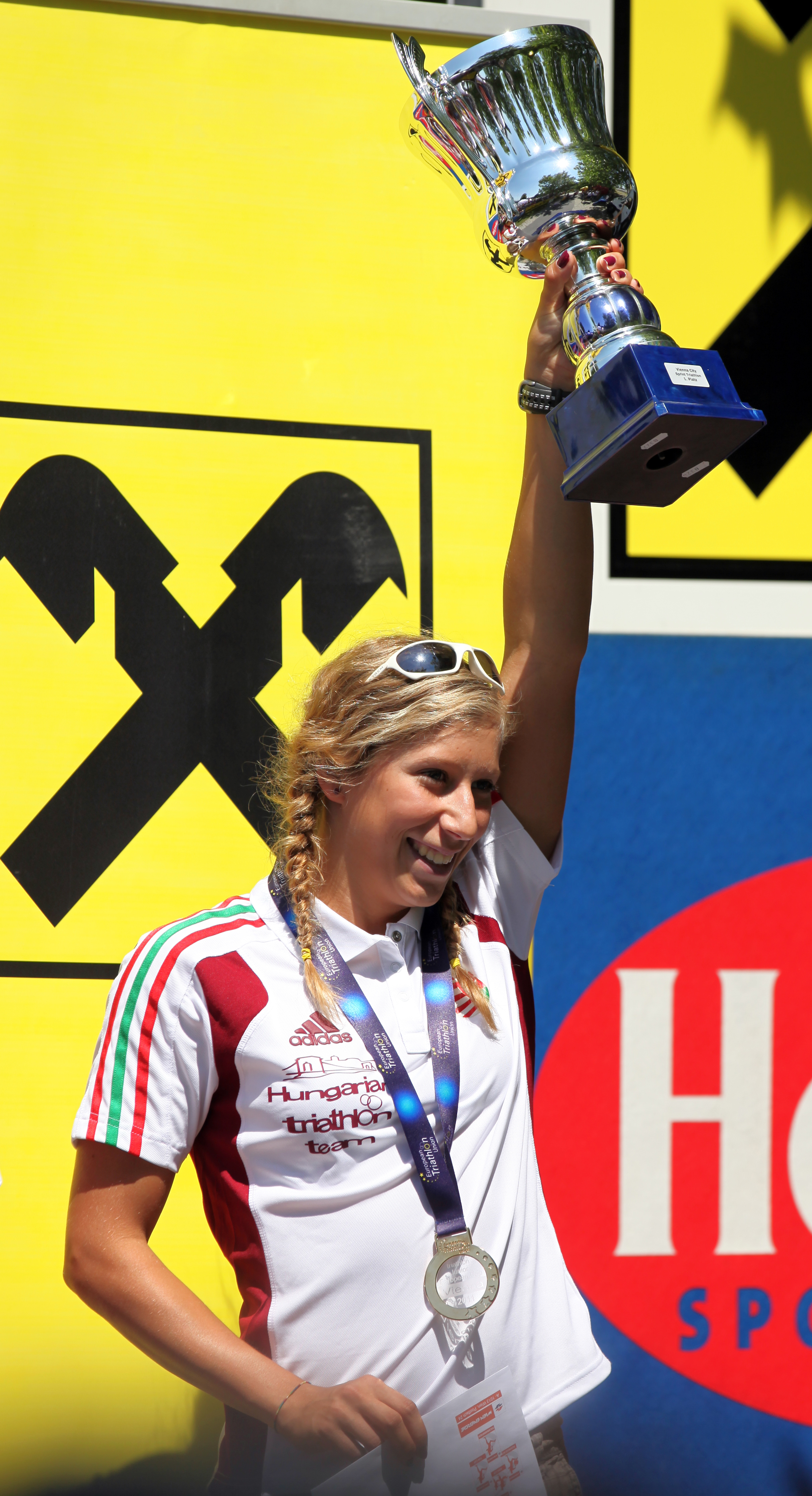
Eszter Pap with the gold medal at the Vienna City Triathlon, 2011.

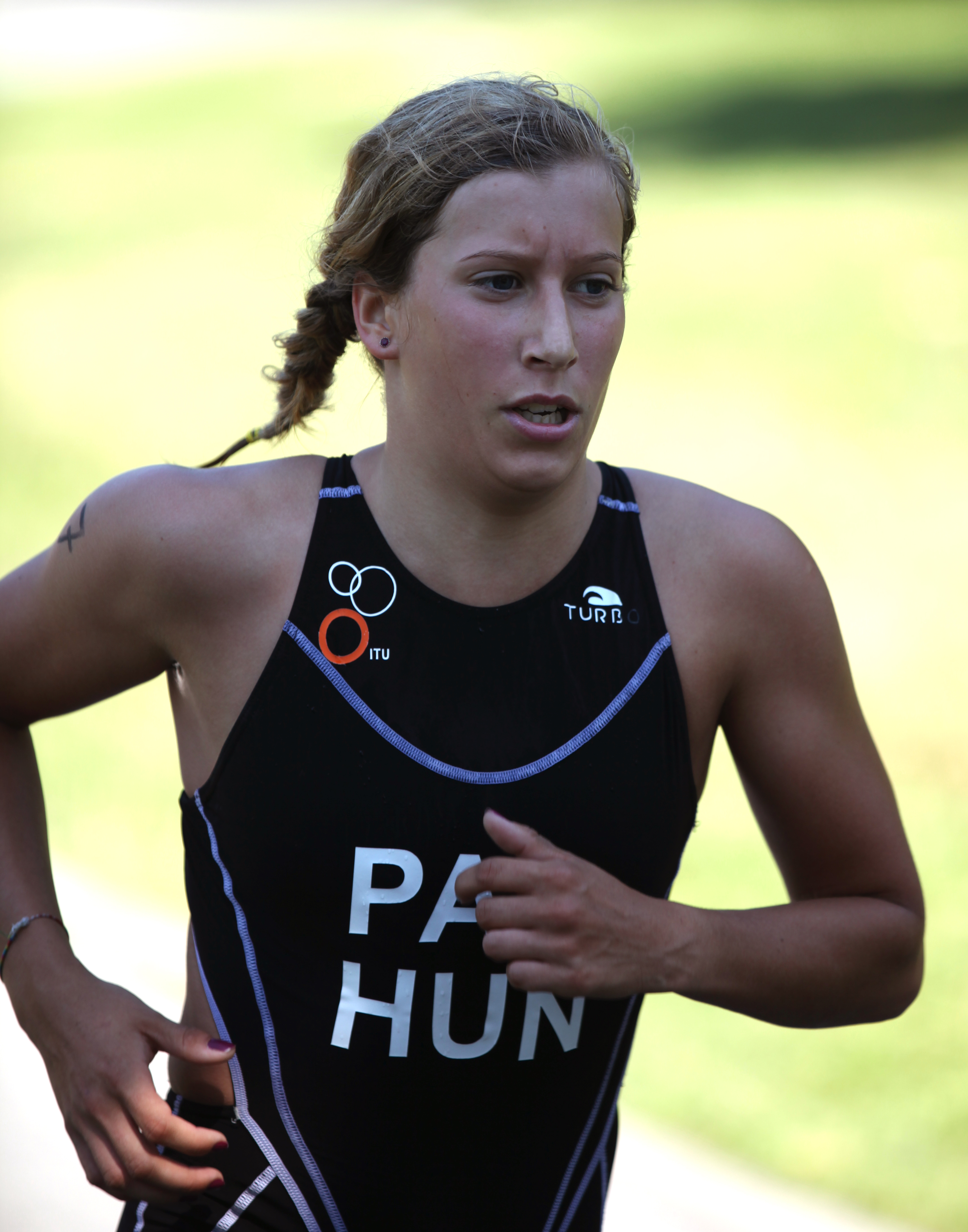
Eszter Pap, gold medalist at the Vienna City Triathlon, 2011.

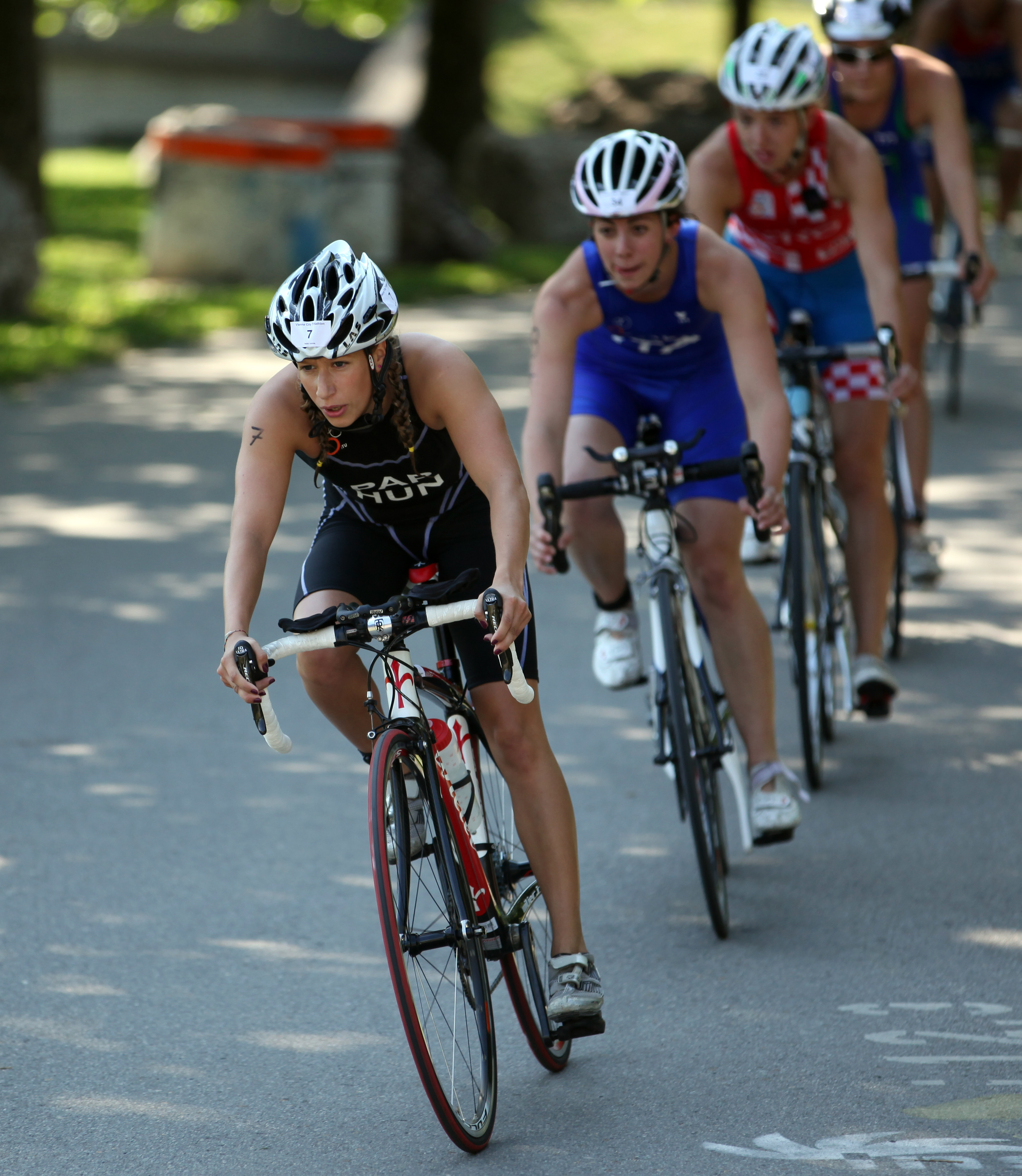
Eszter Pap in the pole position at the bike race of the Vienna City Triathlon, 2011.

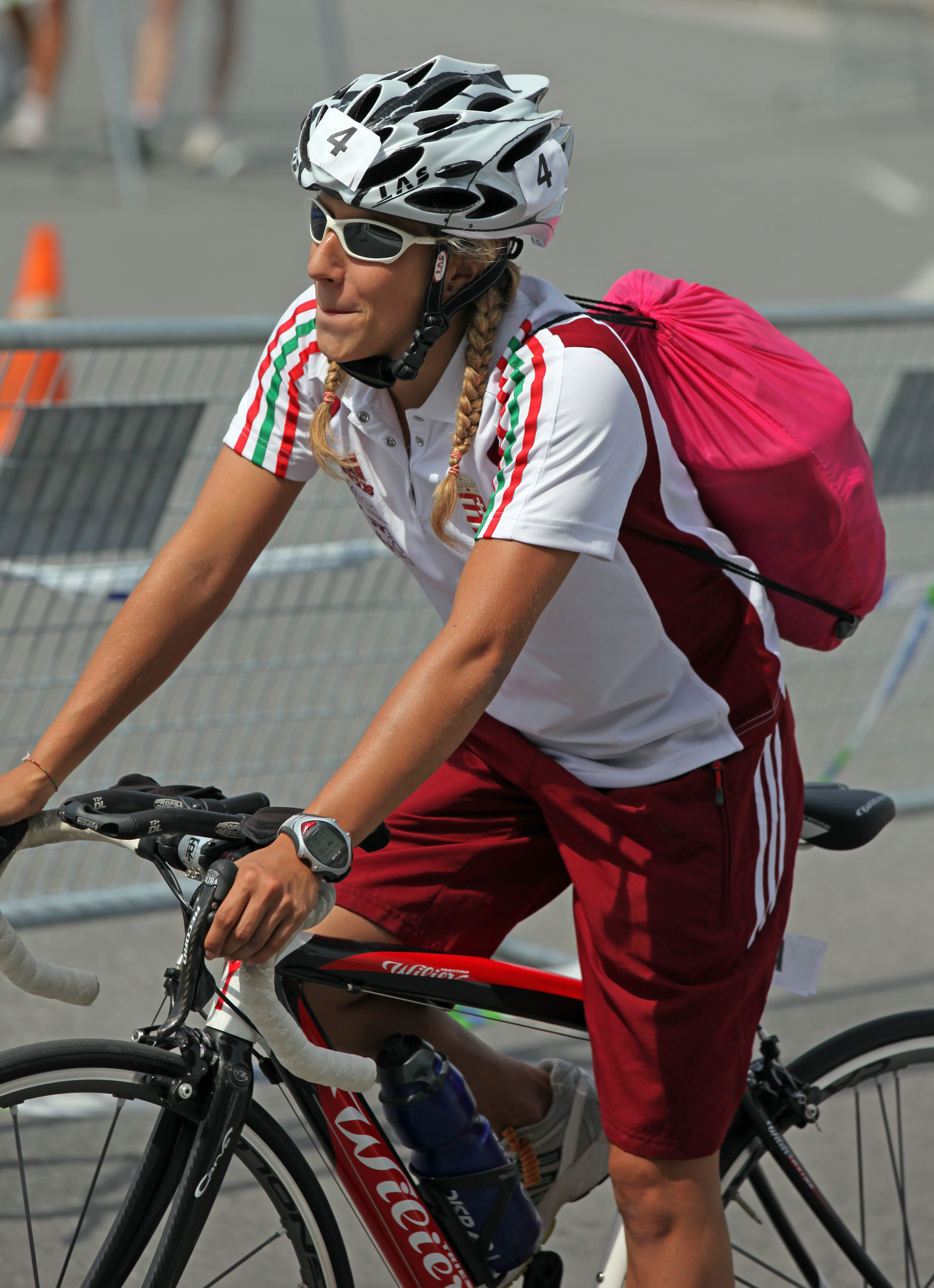
Eszter Pap on the last day of the European Championships in Pontevedra, 2011.
