= Alpe d'Huez Triathlon =

Sport contest

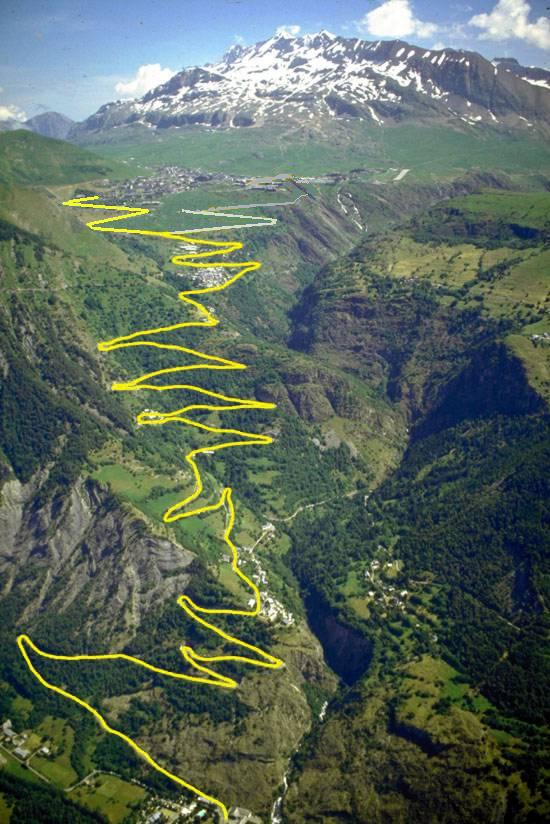
The notorious 21 bends at the end of the bike stage of the Alpe d'Huez triathlon

The Triathlon EDF Alpe d'Huez, named after its sponsor Électricité de France (EDF), was established in 2006 by World Triathlon Champion Cyrille Neveu. (Note: Cyrille Neveu (born 1973), Long Distance Triathlon World Champion of the year 2002, not to be confused with the multiple Rallye Dakar winner Cyril Neveu.) It is not sanctioned by the International Triathlon Union (ITU) or Fédération Française de Triathlon (FFTRI). The long course event comprises a 2.2 km swim, a 115 km cycle and a 22 km run. It starts with the swim at the reservoir Lac du Verney then the cycling features the 21 bends used by the Tour de France as it climbs 1120 m to the ski resort of Alpe d'Huez for the run.

== History ==
In 2009, the long distance triathlon attracted 671 sportsmen and sportswomen (516 finishers) and the short distance triathlon boasted 839 participants (749 finishers), 62 percent of them were French. In 2010 the start list reached a new record with 1150 short distance participants and 943 long distance participants on 15 July, i.e. two weeks before the triathlon.

Most of the Alpe d'Huez winners are international elite stars, especially on the long distance. In 2007 and in 2008 Chrissie Wellington placed first and in 2009 Nicola Spirig won gold. On the short distance, four French triathletes could win the gold medal: Delphine Pelletier, Hervé Faubre, Bertrand Billard, and Frédéric Belaubre. Charlotte Morel, the French U23 Champion of the years 2009 and 2010, placed first on the sprint distance in 2007. In 2008 she won the sprint triathlon in Vaujany and the courte distance (1200+30+7) triathlon in Alpe d'Huez in 2008. In the following years, however, she was dogged by misfortune: in 2009, starting as the natural favourite for the gold medal, she was involved in a bicycle crash right at the beginning, and in 2010 due to health problems she could not take part in the race.

== Alpe d'Huez Triathlon Winners ==
| Year | Sprint | | | Short Distance | | | Long Distance | | |
| Year | Date | Male Winner | Female Winner | Date | Male Winner | Female Winner | Date | Male Winner | Female Winner |
| 2006 | - | - | - | 2 August | Reinaldo Colucci | Delphine Pelletier | - | - | - |
| 2007 | 29 July | Julien Loy | Charlotte Morel | 2 August | Hervé Faure | Tameka Day | 1 August | Reinaldo Colucci | Chrissie Wellington |
| 2008 | 27 July | Julien Loy | Charlotte Morel | 31 July | Bertrand Billard | Charlotte Morel | 30 July | Marcus Ornellas | Chrissie Wellington |
| 2009 | ? | ? | ? | 30 July | Frédéric Belaubre | Eva Janssen | 29 July | Massimo Cigana | Nicola Spirig |
| 2010 | - | - | - | 29 July | Alberto Casadei | Eva Janssen | James Cunnama | Jodie Swallow | |
| 2011 | - | - | - | 28 July | Tim Don | Nicola Spirig | 27 July | Victor Del Corral Morales | Catriona Morrison |
| 2012 | - | - | - | 26 July | Dan Wilson | Charlotte Morel | 25 July | Victor Del Corral Morales | Mary Beth Ellis |
| 2013 | - | - | - | July 25 | Étienne Diemunsch | Emma Jackson | July 24 | Ritchie Nicholls | Mary Beth Ellis |
| 2014 | - | - | - | July 31 | Tom Richard | Emma Jackson | July 30 | Todd Skipworth | Catriona Morrison |
| 2015 | - | - | - | August 1 | Frederic Belaubre | Charlotte Morel | July 31 | Arnaud Guilloux | Emma Pooley |
| 2016 | - | - | - | July 28 | Dan Wilson | Andrea Hewitt | July 27 | James Cunnama | Jeanne Collonge |
| 2017 | - | - | - | July 28 | Anatole Giraud-Telme | Julie Derron | July 27 | Christian Kramer | Tine Deckers |

== Gallery ==
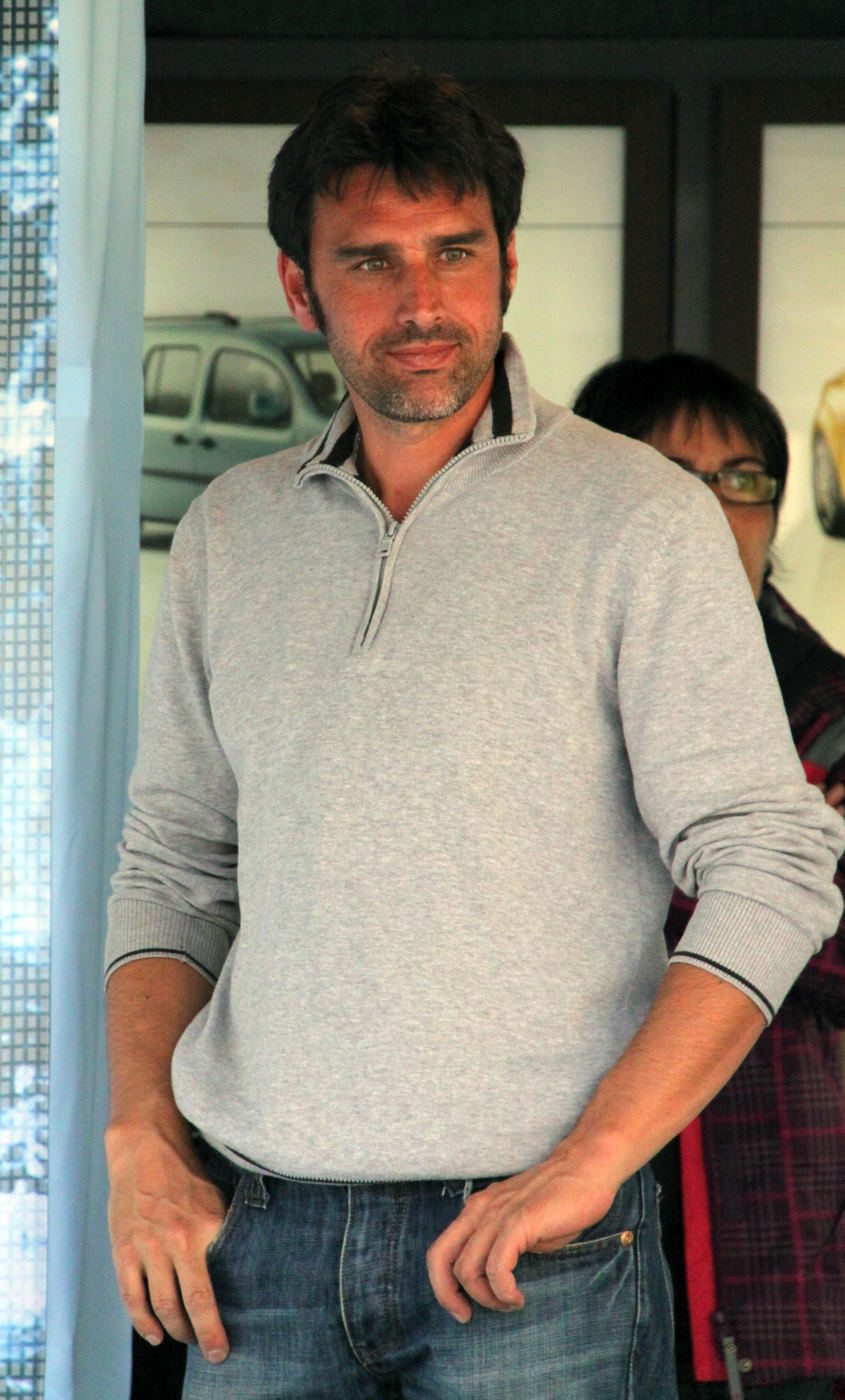
Cyrille Neveu, the creator of the Triathlon de l'Alpe d'Huez

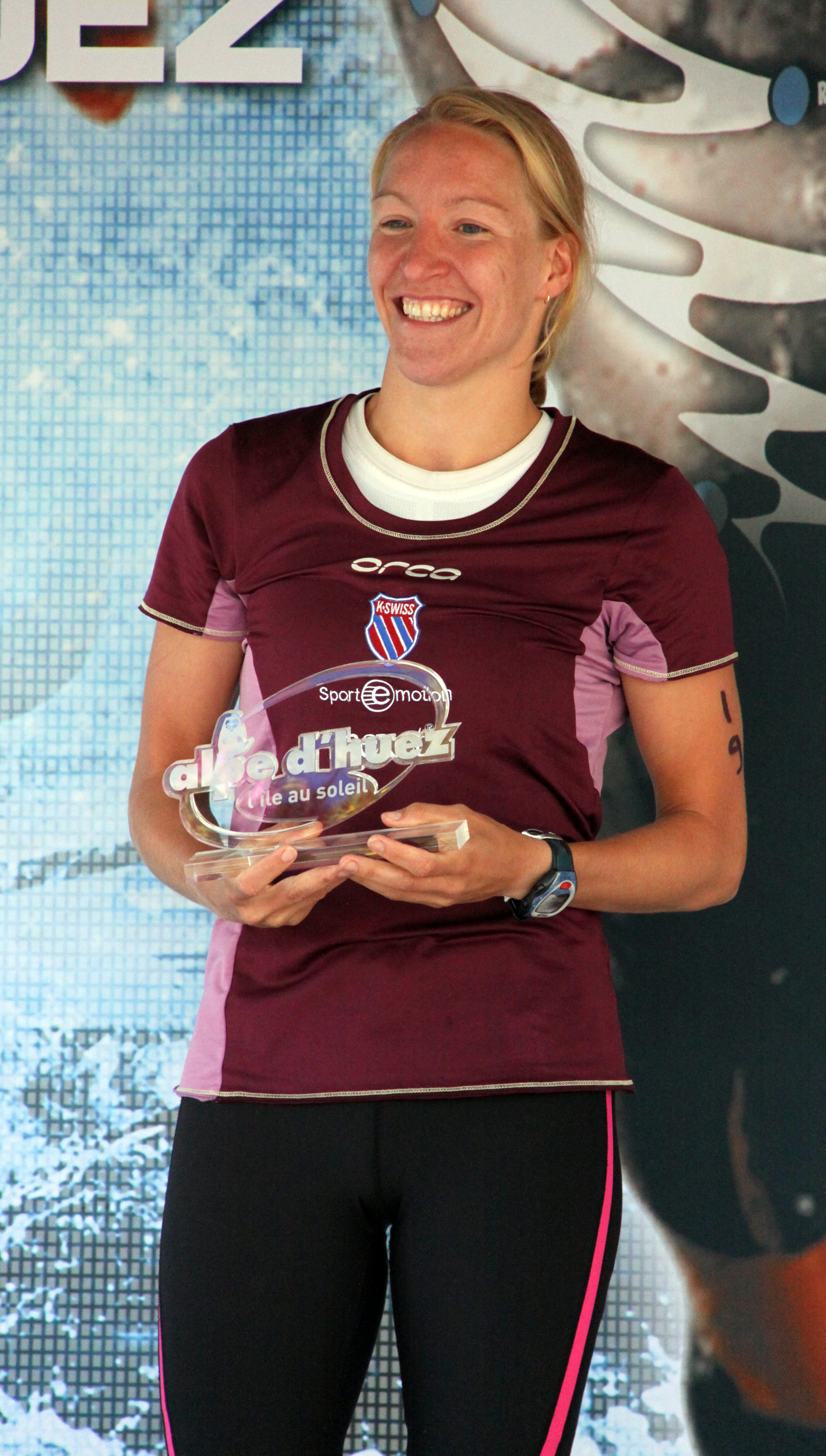
Eva Janssen, short distance winner of the Triathlon de l'Alpe d'Huez in 2009 and 2010

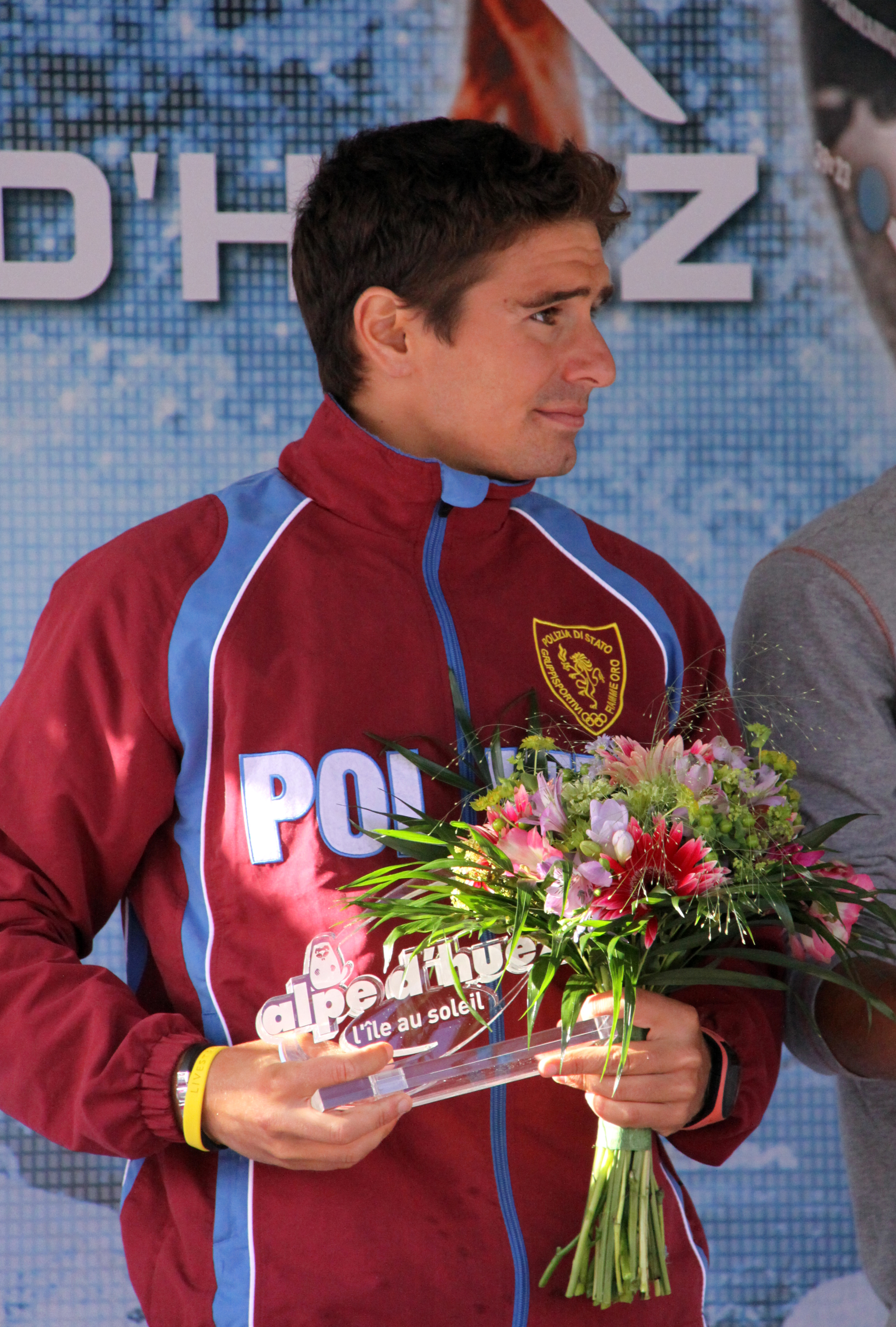
Alberto Casadei, short distance winner of the Triathlon de l'Alpe d'Huez 2010

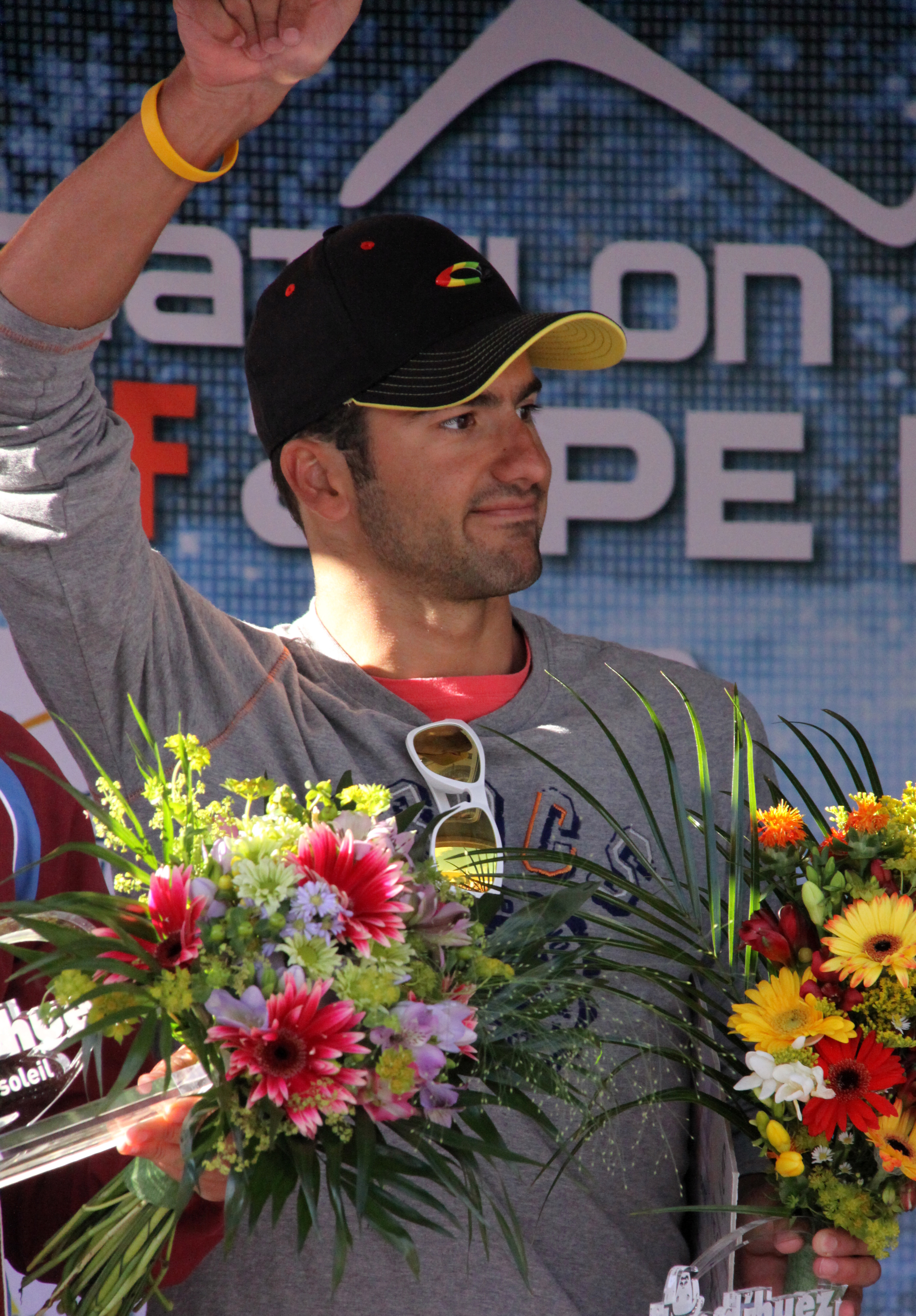
Francesc Godoy, silver medalist of the Triathlon de l'Alpe d'Huez 2010

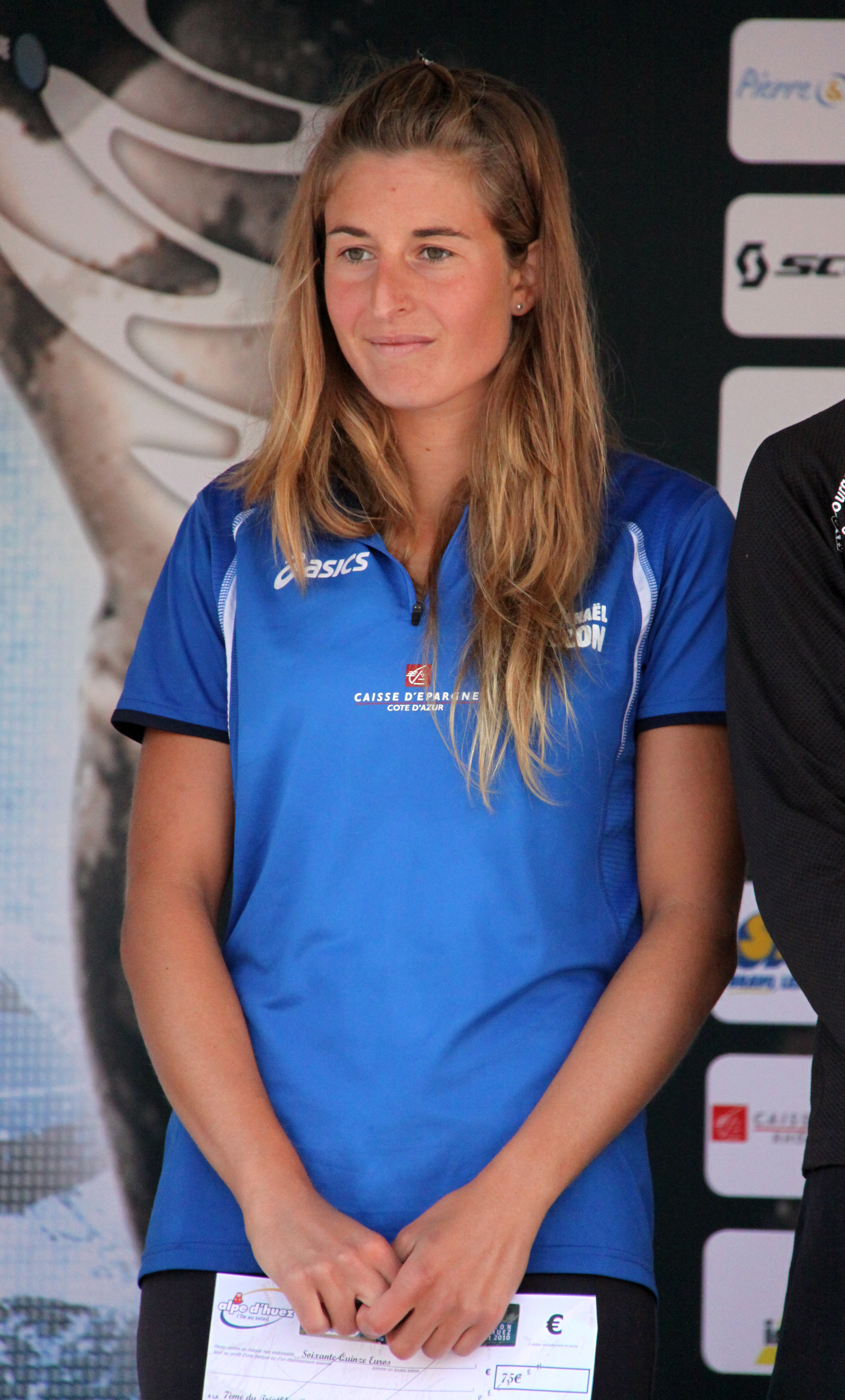
Camille Donat, 2009 silver medalist, placing 7th at the Triathlon de l'Alpe d'Huez 2010

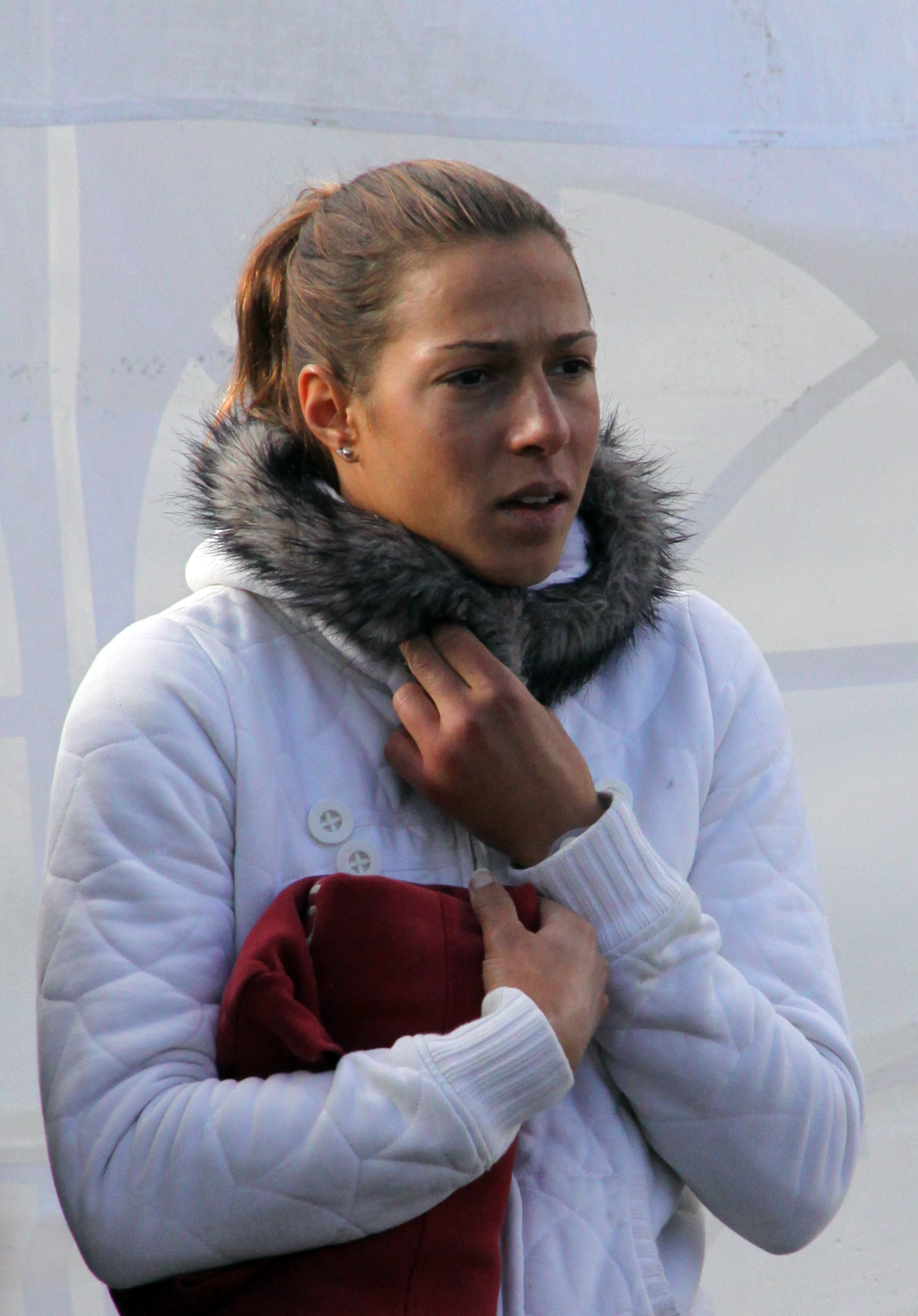
Charlotte Morel, a spectator in 2010
