= Charlotte Morel =

French triathlete (born 1989)

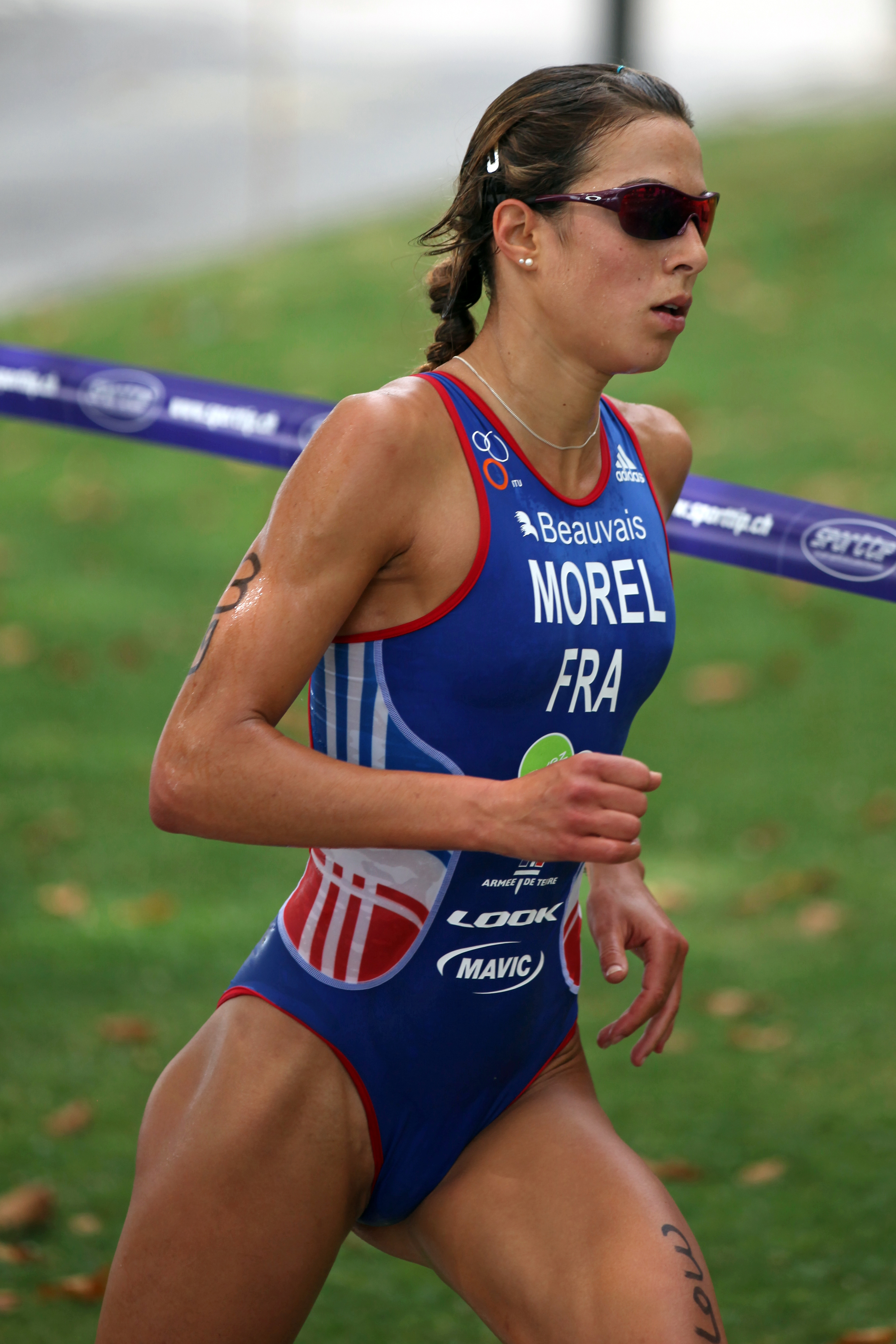
Charlotte Morel, bronze medalist at the Military Triathlon World Championship in Lausanne, 2012.

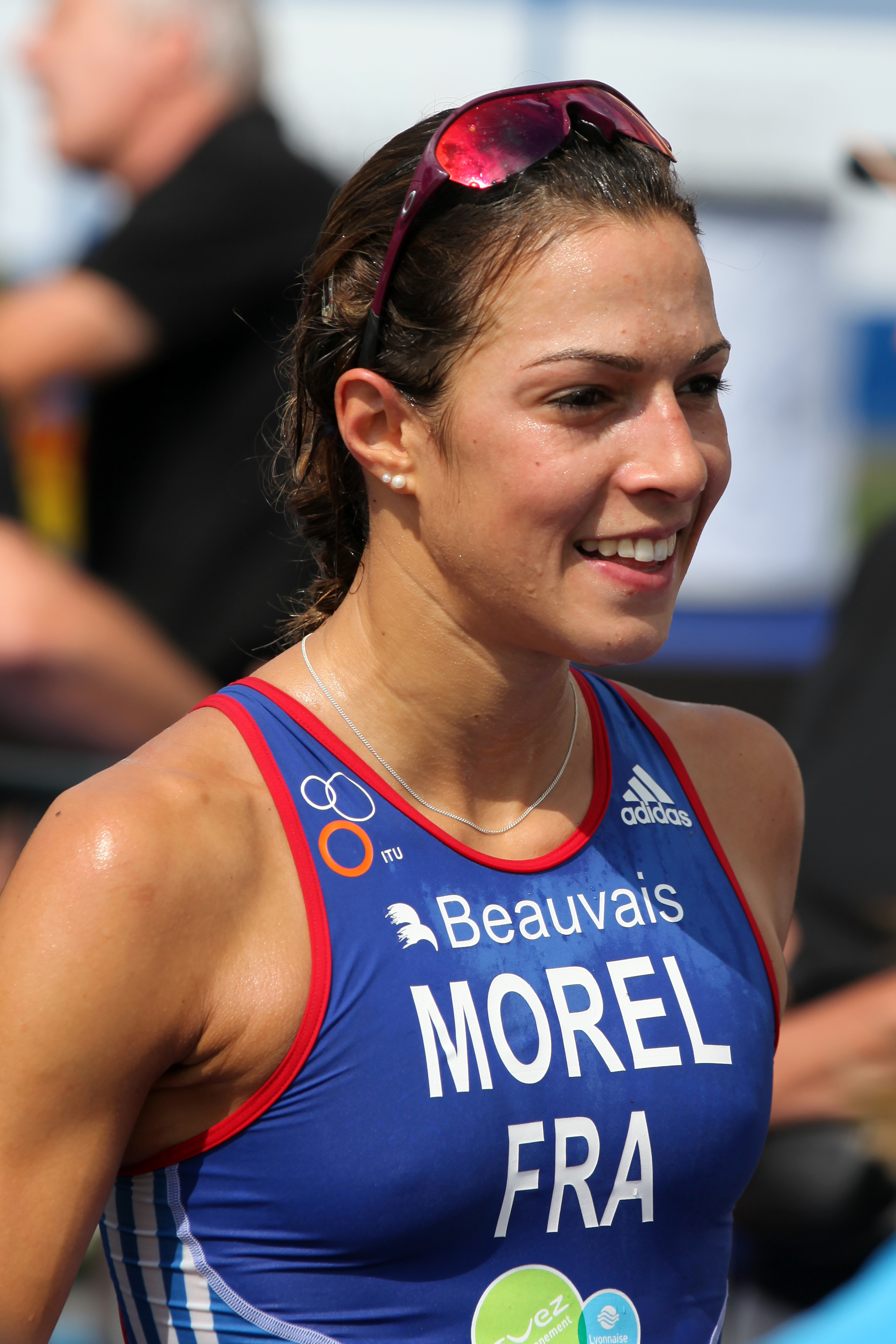
Morel at the Military World Championship, 2012.

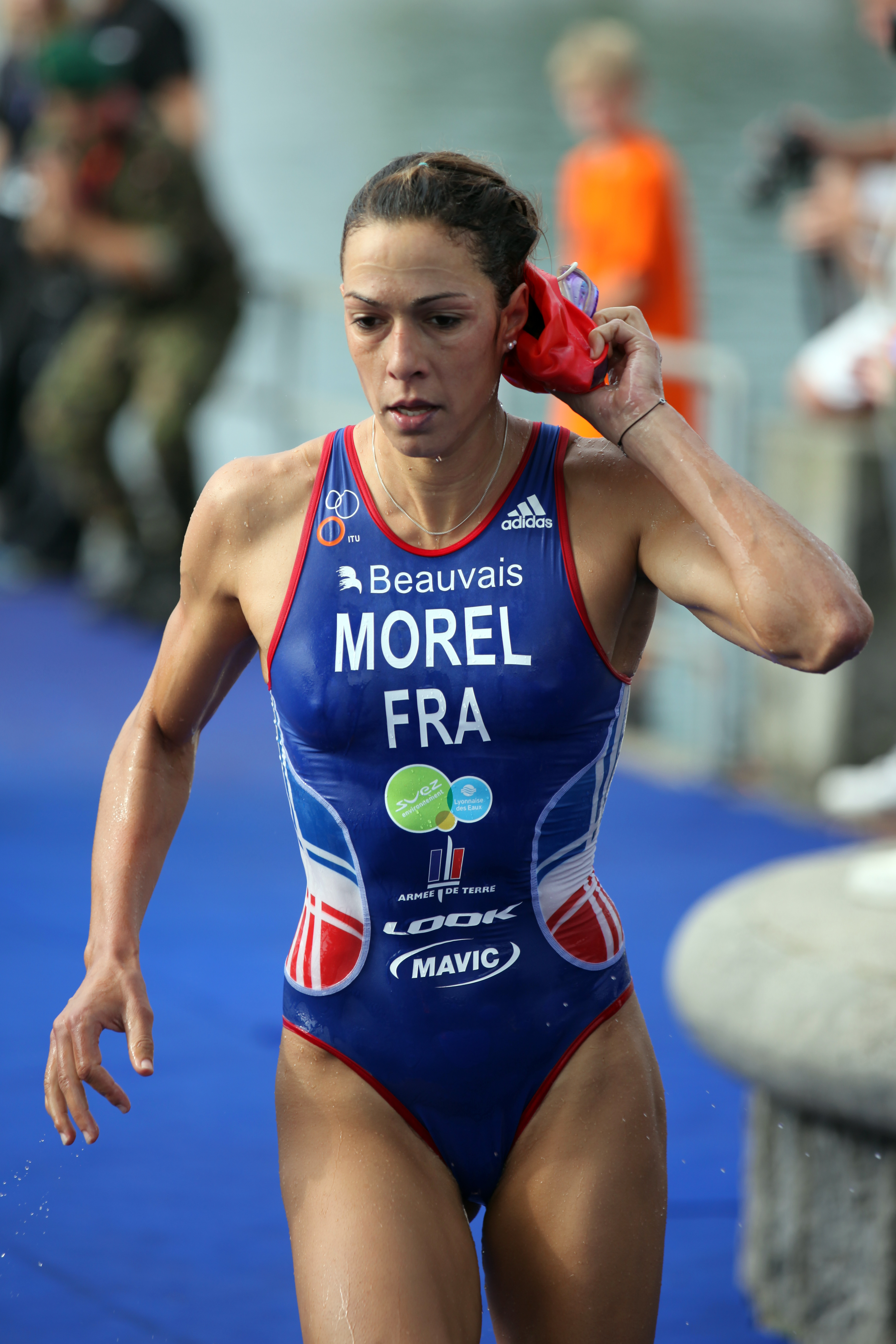
Morel, eighth after the swim at the Military World Championship, 2012.

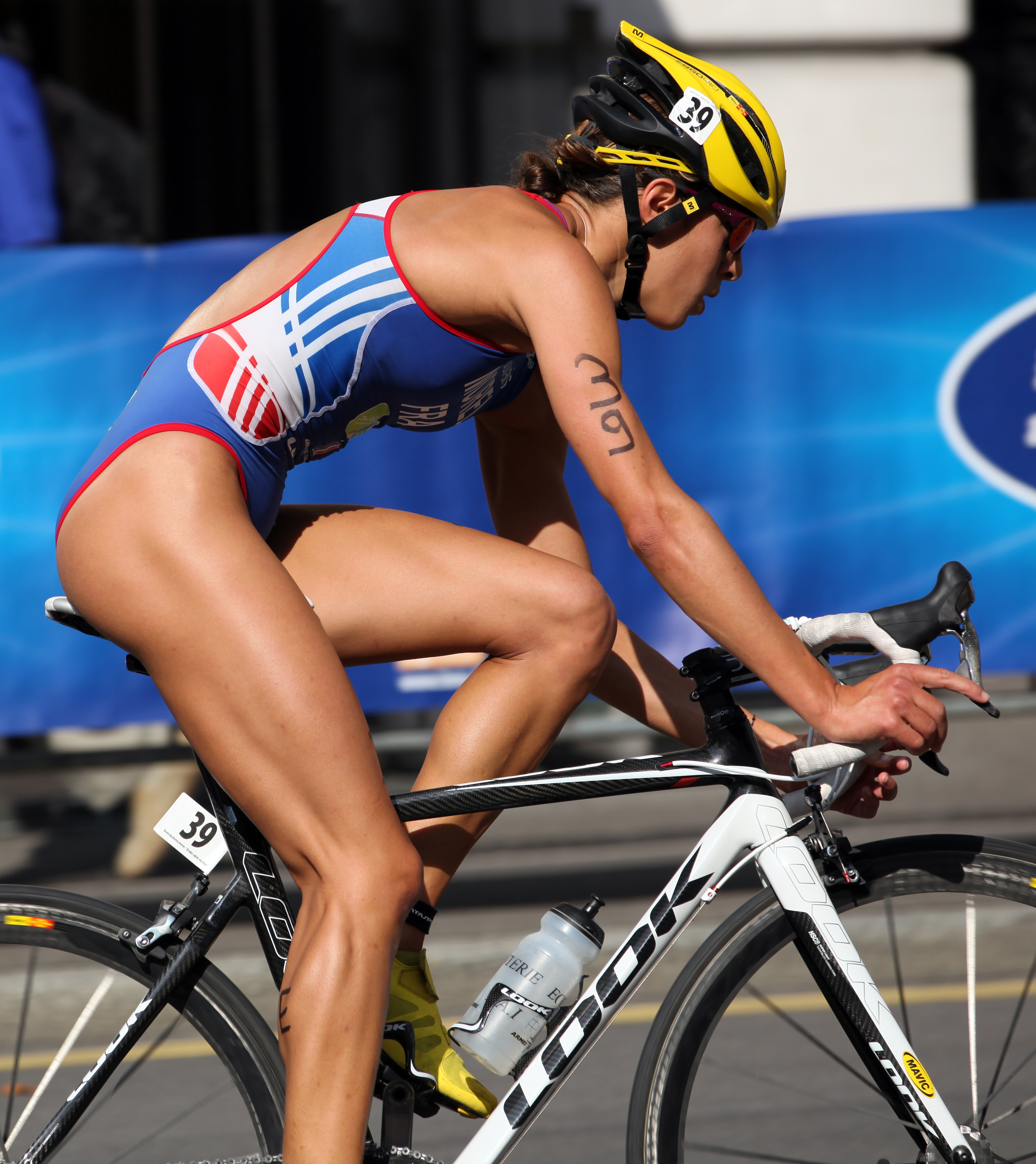
Morel at the Military World Championship in Lausanne, 2012.

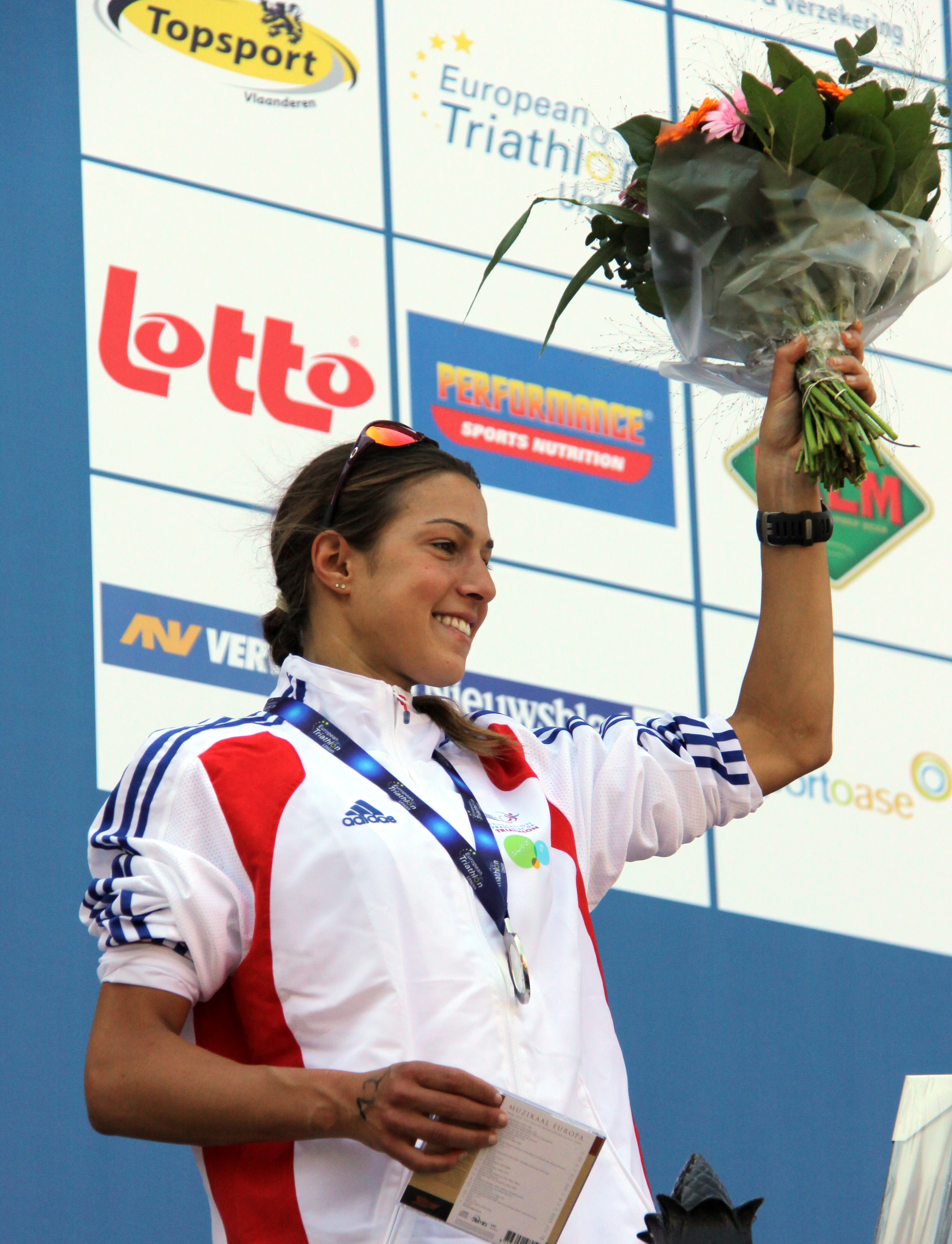
Charlotte Morel with the silver medal at the Premium European Cup triathlon in Brasschaat, 2010.

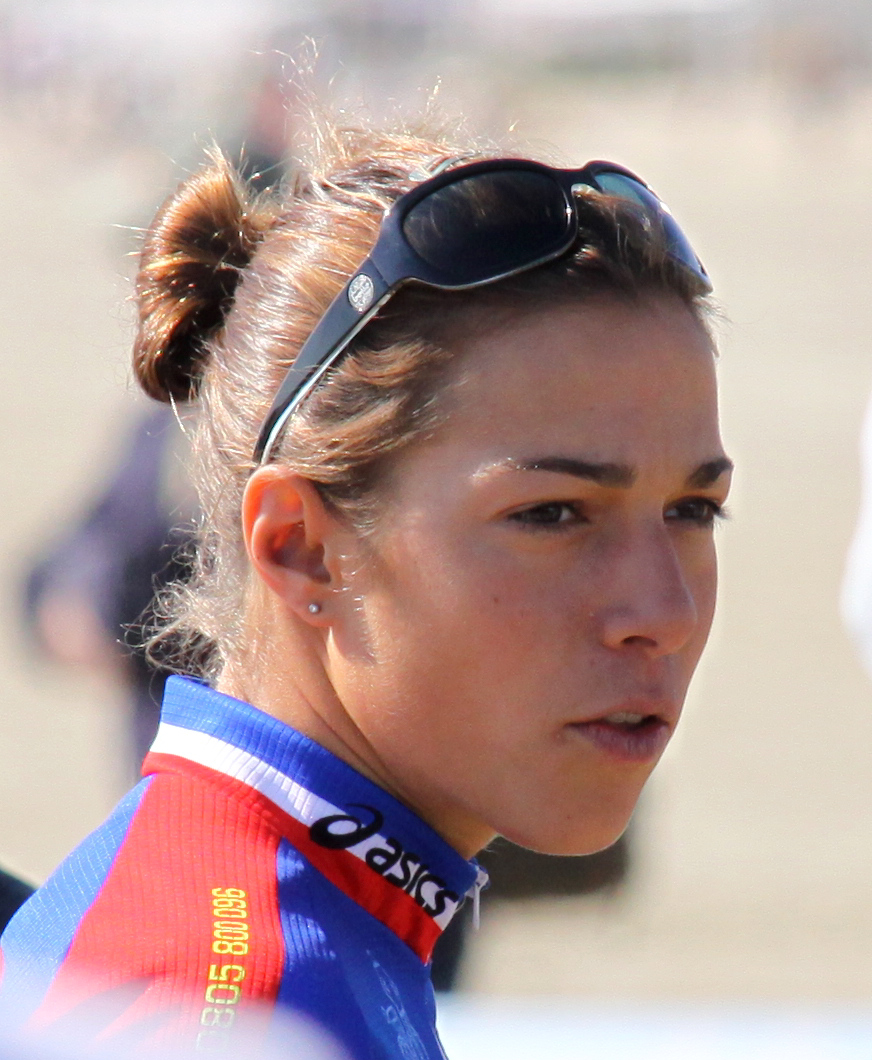
Morel as a spectator at the Grand Final of the Club Championship Series in La Baule, 2009.

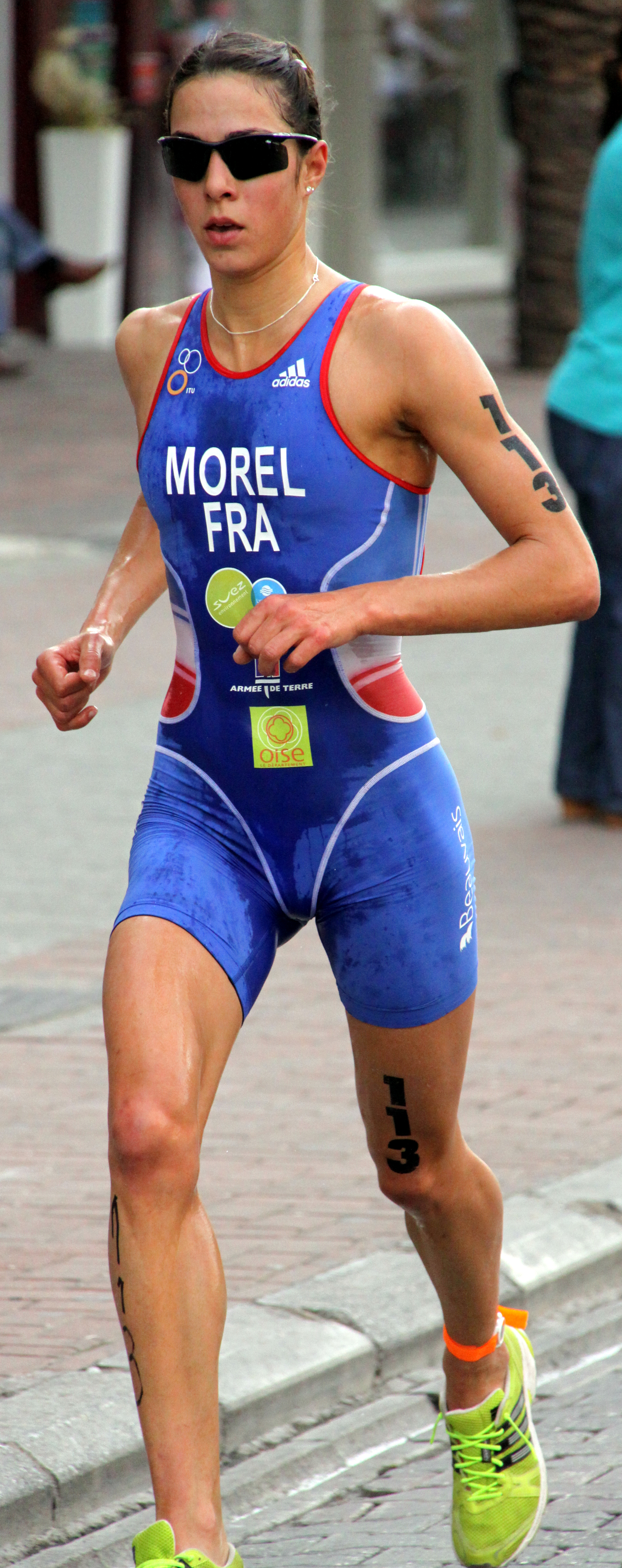
Morel still 40 seconds ahead of the rest of the field in Alanya, 2009.

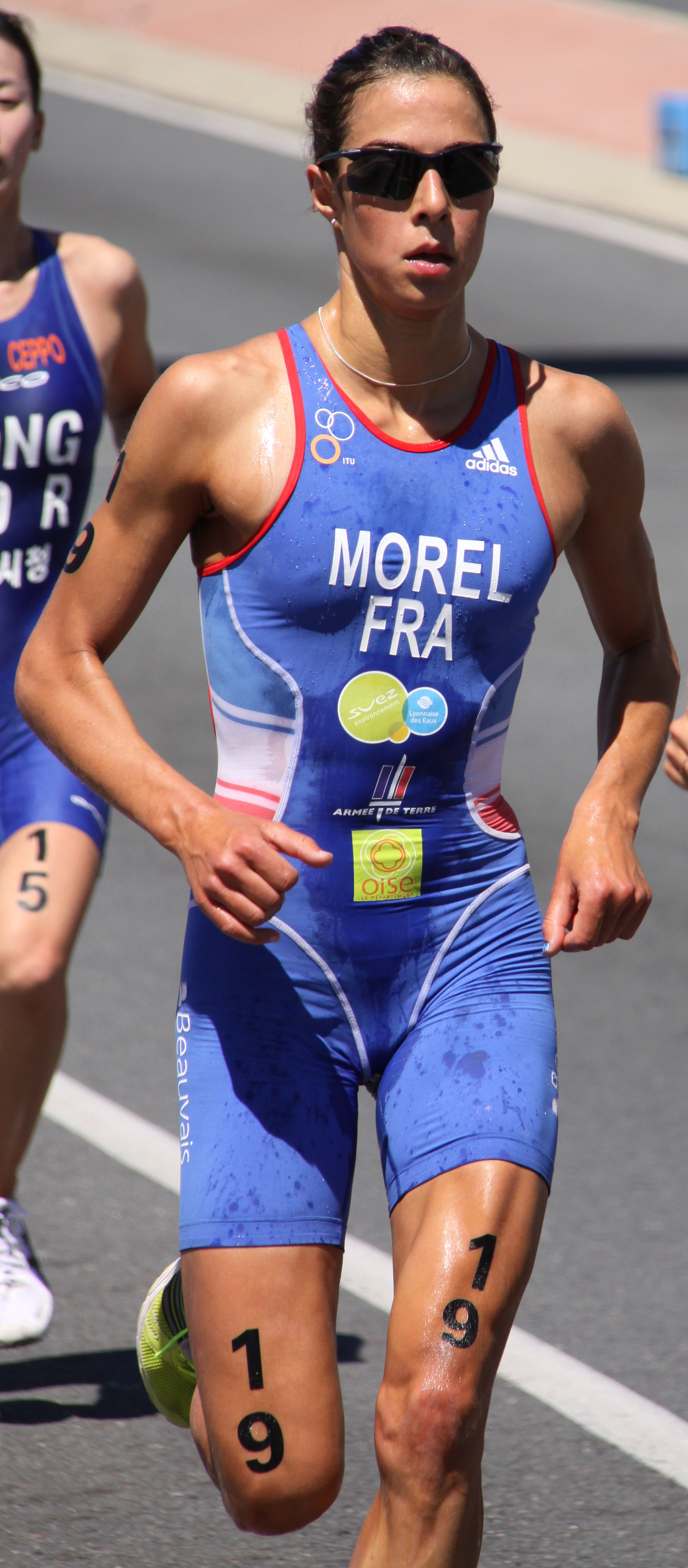
Charlotte Morel in the Dextro Energy Gold Coast triathlon, 2009.

Charlotte Morel (born 16 January 1989 in Draguignan, Var), is a French professional triathlete, twelve times National Champion in various duathlon and triathlon categories (cadette, junior, espoir), e.g. National U23 Triathlon Champion of the years 2009, 2010, 2011, and 2012. Since 2006, Morel is a permanent member of the French National Team. In the French Club Championship Series, Morel represented the club Beauvais, which e.g. in 2006, 2009 and in 2010 won both the French Club Championship Series Lyonnaise des Eaux and the National Club Championships in Gruissan. From 2013 to 2016, however, Morel will represent Issy les Moulineaux because of Beauvais' complete retreat from the elite sports.

Like e.g. Emmie Charayron, David Hauss and Laurent Vidal, Morel is also a member of the French Military Triathlon Team (Equipe de France militaire de triathlon EFM), which she joined in 2008 and which in summer 2010 moved from Montpellier to the Ecoles militaires de Draguignan (EMD) in Morel's native town. In 2012 Morel won the bronze medal at the World Military Triathlon Championships.

== Education ==
Having finished the local collège in Draguignan in 2004, Morel was admitted to the triathlon section of the Pôle Espoir CREPS PACA, a high performance centre situated in a small pine forest in Boulouris close to St. Raphael which closely collaborates with the Lycée Saint Exupery, a high school in St. Raphael. Since then, and up to now, Pierre Houseaux has been Morel's trainer and she still lives in Boulouris (Aigue Bonne) even though she joined the triathlon club of Beauvais in 2006 and, like the well-known triathletes Sylvain Sudrie, Laurent Vidal, Emmie Charayron and Delphine Pelletier, she enrolled at the Military School Ecole d’application d’infanterie (= EAI), then in Montpellier, in December 2007 (grade: soldat 1re classe; 2012: caporal). In 2008 Moreland her EAI team won the gold medal at the Military World Championships in Estonia, in the individual ranking Morel placed 5th. At the Military World Championships 2011 in Rio de Janeiro (24 July 2011) Morel placed 5th again, the French female team placed fourth and the French mixed team won the gold medal. In 2012, Morel won the bronze medal at the Military Triathlon World Championship in Lausanne (25 August 2012).

In June 2006, Morel took her high-school diploma at the Lycée Saint Exupery (BAC S = scientifique, i.e. sciences de la vie et de la terre) and registered with the University of Nice for undergraduate and postgraduate studies in sports (STAPS = Sciences et techniques des activités physiques et sportives). In summer 2008 she obtained the DEUG STAPS (Diplôme d’études universitaires générales) and in summer 2009 the Licence L3 in éducation et motricité, a kind of bachelor's degree, to go on with her Master's studies in nutrition (Prévention et Education pour la Santé par l'Activité Physique, option Prévention par l'alimentation et la nutrition), which she concluded in June 2011.

Tall as she is (1.72m), Morel has been featured several times as a maillots de bain model, e.g. on the frontpage and in a special section of the leading French magazine Triathlète. The French media often depicted Morel and Emmie Charayron, the Junior World Champion of 2009, as the most promising prospects for the 2012 Summer Olympics. The leading French magazine, Triathlète, for instance, dedicated its famous two-page column called "Confrontation" to the two young triathletes.

Morel and the several times National and European champion Frédéric Belaubre, who is also part of the elite centre CREPS PACA in Boulouris and also represented the elite team of Beauvais (until 2011), are a couple.

== Career ==
Born into a sports family, Charlotte Morel started swimming at the age of three, and at ten years old for the first time she took part in cross country running competitions organized by the UNSS (= Union nationale du sport scolaire). Her younger brother Jérémy "Jey" Morel is the National French Cyclo-cross Junior Champion of the year 2009 and also takes part in triathlons. At the famous Embrunman (Long Distance), for instance, he placed 30th (15 August 2012). It was Charlotte Morel's uncle Didier Morel who brought her to the triathlon club of Draguignan in 2003.

=== 2005 ===
On her homepage Morel looks at the year 2006 as a turning point when she started to compete internationally and, in Guadeloupe, for the first time took part in a short distance triathlon (Olympic distance). In 2005, however, Morel won the National Duathlon Championships (category: cadets) and took part in the European Junior Championships in Greece. Together with winner of the 2004 Junior Championships Juliette Benedicto, she was considered the rising star among the young French triathletes. Morel does not mention this event among her "palmarés" and, in fact, this debut was overshadowed by a serious bicycle accident. Morel managed to finish the race and even overtook five competitors, but she was noticeably weakened and even though, the following day, the French team could place 8th in the women relay (among 11 teams), Morel's individual time would have relegated her to the most disappointing 29th of 33 places.

=== 2006 ===
At the age of 17 Morel, the 2006 National Champion in Duathlon and Triathlon, started to assert herself on an international level, too. In the Junior class, she placed 13th at the European Championships in Autun and 7th at the World Championships in Lausanne. At the Duathlon World Championship in Rimini she achieved a top-ten position as well and in Switzerland she won the gold medal at the Sprint Triathlon of Walliswil. In France she represented the club Beauvais and took part in two triathlons of the prestigious elite D1 Club Championship Series: in Beauvais she placed 28th and in Lorient 11th.

=== 2007 ===
In 2007 Morel was again the National Duathlon and Triathlon Champion in the Junior class, but she also won the National Triathlon Championships in the U23 category (Espoir) and this result at the same time gained her, at the age of 18, the silver medal in the French Elite ranking. Morel also represented Beauvais in the Club Championship Series (Grand Prix). In the three competitions in which she took part she was always among the top-three of her age category (Junior): Lorient (3rd, overall 32nd), Embrun (2nd, overall 6th), and La Baule (3rd, overall 8th). At the European Junior Championships in Copenhagen and the World Junior Championships in Hamburg she placed 6th and 8th respectively. As an 18-year-old she also competed in the Elite class successfully: at the European Cup and the Premium European Cup in Poland and in Turkey respectively she placed 11th and 14th. After her traditional summer training camp in Alpe d'Huez Charlotte Morel won the sprint triathlon in Vaujany (29 July 2007).

=== 2008 ===
In this year Morel competed in various age categories. She placed 9th at the European Junior Championships in Lisbon and 24th at the Junior World Championships in Vancouver. At the U23 European Championships in Pulpí she placed 5th in the individual ranking and 2nd in the team competition. In Luxemburg she took part, for the first time in her life, in a European Cup triathlon and straight away won the gold medal. In 2008 Morel also had her World Cup debut, placing 24th in Lorient. With her French team EAI she also won the gold medal at the Military World Championships in Estonia, placing 4th in the individual ranking.

On the national level, she continued to establish herself as the number one among the young triathletes, although she was not allowed, obviously for some strategic reasons, to take part in the National Junior Championships again, which would have gained her another gold medal, for the last time in the Junior category (jeunes). She placed 2nd in the National Duathlon Championships, but she won the gold medal in the junior category at the Courte Distance (Olympic distance) triathlon of Embrun. Morel also took part in three Lyonnaise des Eaux competitions and with her club Beauvais she could win the gold medal in this renowned French Club Championship Series. In Paris she placed 9th (U23: 3rd), in Beauvais 8th (U23: 5th), and in La Baule 13th (U23: 5th).

As the apex of the season 2008, Morel might consider her triumph at the famous triathlon in, or rather onto, L’Alpe d’Huez (31 July 2008) with its famous 21 U-turns and a gradient of 14 per cent, after she had already won the gold medal four days before at the Sprint Triathlon in Vaujany. In 2009, Morel was expected to win again, but right at the beginning of the bicycle race she had to avoid a crashed competitor and had a bad fall, too, whose consequences one could easily notice when Morel took part in her next triathlon, the World Cup of Tiszaújváros.

=== 2009 ===
The two most outstanding international results of 2009 are Morel's 8th place at the U23 World Championships (Grand Final of the Dextro Energy Championship Series in Southport / Gold Coast) and her 6th place (Elite) at the Premium European Cup in Alanya, where Morel took the lead in the bicycle race and, when leaving the transition area, was still some 40 seconds ahead of Helle Frederiksen. In France, Morel could contribute to the gold medal of her club, Beauvais, in both the Lyonnaise des Eaux Club Championship Series and the National Club Championship in Gruissan. Surprisingly, at the fifth and last Lyonnaise des Eaux competition, the Grand Final in La Baule, Morel was only a spectator. Apart from Delphine Py Bilot (15th), her club relied almost exclusively on its foreign stars Anja Dittmer (1st), Andrea Hewitt (3rd), Hollie Avil (5th), and Vicky Holland (12th), without whom the club would never have won the club championship. The winning male team of the Lyonnaise championship series, i.e. Sartrouville, also won the gold medal only with the help of foreign elite stars like the Brownlee brothers. In three of the four preceding Lyonnaise triathlons Morel outdid Py Bilot: in Dunkerque she placed 15th (4th/U23) whereas Py Bilot placed 24th, in Beauvais Morel placed 6th (3rd/U23) as opposed to Py Bilot's 7th place, in Tours Morel placed 10th (2nd/U23) whereas Py Bilot was 17th, but in Paris Morel placed 11th (5th/U23) and Py Bilot was 9th. On 26 September 2009, however, i.e. the day of the famous club championship competition for which she was not nominated, together with her teammates Laetitia Duhamel and Sophie Henssien, Morel did take part in the Tri Relais of La Baule, as she also took part in the Courte Distance triathlon of La Baule on 27 September 2009. In both competitions Morel easily won the gold medals, but among the competitors of these races there was no match for Morel since not even Emmie Charayron took part. Before the Gold Coast competition Morel had already achieved three top-ten positions in ITU/ETU triathlons in 2009: she had placed 9th (Elite) at the European Cup in Quarteira, 6th at the European U23 Championships in Italy, and 4th at the European Cup in Athlone, although her luggage had been lost and she had to borrow some equipment immediately before the race.

Morel's very last race of the year 2009 was the triathlon in Karukera which she had already won in 2006 and 2007. This time she finished first as well, though hand in hand with Alexandra Cassan-Ferrier. In the ITU ranking of the year 2009 (Women's Standing) Morel is number 13 among the best 63 female U23 triathletes of the world.

=== 2010 ===
After the National Team's training camp in Lanzarote, Morel, hampered by an injury, had to do without the run and bike training for one and a half month and after her disappointing 22nd position at the World Cup in Quarteira she decided not to take part in the World Cup in Ishigaki, to which, anyway, most European triathletes could not travel because of the Icelandic ash cloud. Morel did not start at a range of triathlons which, originally, had been listed among her goals (objectifs) on her webpage, e.g. the FITRI triathlon in Andora, the Triathlon EDF Alpe d'Huez, the European Cup in Geneva, the European U23 Championships in Vila Nova de Gaia (Porto), and the World Cup Tongyeong.

Representing Beauvais Triathlon in the Club Championship Series Lyonnaise des Eaux, Morel placed 19th (i.e. 5th in the U23 ranking) in Dunkirk, 13th (3rd) in Beauvais, and 15th (7th) in Paris, thus being always among the three best triathlètes classants l'équipe. For the Grand Final in La Baule (i.e. Triathlon Audencia) on 18 September 2010, however, her club had nominated her only among the triatlètes invitées U23, obviously because of her persistent knee injury, and she could not finish the race.

The two most successful events were the

- French National Championships in Charleville, where Morel could again win the U23 title and beat her rival Emmie Charayron, who had surpassed Morel in Quarteira and had won the silver medal at the World Championship Series triathlon in Madrid, and the
- Premium European Cup in Brasschaat, where Morel won the silver medal.

At the U23 World Championships in Budapest, her main target of this year, Morel had a bike accident in drenching rain. Back to France she decided not to postpone the inevitable knee surgery.

=== 2011 ===
Morel stayed with Beauvais Triathlon although her club decided to boycott the French Club Championship Series Lyonnaise des Eaux, which it has won eleven times. Morel, however, took part in the German 2. Bundesliga / Nord representing the club EJOT. At the opening triathlon in Gladbeck (15 May 2011) she placed first in the individual ranking and won the team gold medal together with Scarlet and Mignon Vatlach and Eszter Pap.

=== 2012 ===
After a disc injury at the end of 2011 and two three weeks training camps in Kenya (December 2011) and Lanzarote (January 2012), Morel took part in two ITU events: in both Larache and in Geneva she placed fourth. Due to a double fatigue fracture, however, Morel missed the triathlons necessary for the qualification for the Olympic Games. Nevertheless, in July and August Morel was back to the top and won the internationally renowned triathlons in Alpe d'Huez (26 July 2012) and the Olympic Distance Embrunman (15 August 2012). At the Military World Championship in Lausanne Morel won the bronze medal in the individual ranking and the gold medal in the mixed team ranking. At the Grand Final of the German Bundesliga club championship in Schliersee (8 September 2012), Morel placed first and helped her team EJOT Buschhütten win the circuit. At the scenic Trans-Tahitienne triathlon in Tahiti (27 and 28 October 2012) Morel placed second with her fiancé Frédéric Belaubre, the winning couple being David Hauss and Melanie Hauss Annaheim. At the equally scenic Indian Ocean Triathlon (13 November 2012, 1.8+55+12 km) Morel won the gold medal like the year before.

=== 2013 ===
At the beginning of March, Morel suffered a stress fracture in her tibia and had to abandon her running training for three months. Nevertheless, the year was a success. Morel achieved three ITU medals and, being no. 60 in the ITU Points List (as of 18 November 2013) she proved to be the best French female triathlete apart from Jessica Harrison. In the French Grand Prix de Triathlon circuit Morel represented Issy Triathlon, since her old club Beauvais Triathlon completely withdrew from all triathlon activities. At the opening in Dunkirk (26 May 2013) and at the Grand Final in Nice (29 September 2013), Morel did not finish due to bike accidents, however, at Les Sables d'Olonne (9 June 2013) she placed 24th, in Saint-Jean-de-Monts (22 June 2013) 20th and in Sartrouville (1 September 2013) 13th, thus proving the first (Les Sables) or second best triathlete (Saint-Jean, Sartrouville) of her club. Morel also won several local triathlons, e.g. at Manosque (Triathlon des Vannades, 30 June 2013), Gérardmer (8 September 2013) and La Baule (15 September 2013). At the Alpe d'Huez Olympic Distance triathlon (25 July 2013), which she had won previously in 2008 and 2012, Morel won the silver medal in the female senior category behind Emma Jackson. As usual, Morel ended the season with the Indian Ocean Triathlon in Mauritius (23 November 2013), winning the gold medal together with her fiancé Frédéric Belaubre. For the season 2014, Morel announced to abandon the Olympic Distance and to change to the long distance (half ironman), which also means that she does not aspire to the Olympics in Brazil any longer. Morel also changed her club and will represent the local club of her home town Saint-Raphaël Triathlon.

== ITU Competitions ==
In the eight years from 2005 to 2012, Morel took part in 35 ITU competitions plus 3 World Military Triathlons and achieved 24 top ten positions (excluding Military team rankings). Unless indicated otherwise, the following competitions are triathlons and belong to the Elite category. The list is based upon the official ITU rankings and the athlete's ITU Profile Page.

Date	Competition	Place	Rank !
2005-07-23	European Championships (Junior)	Alexandroupoli(s)	36
2005-07-24	European Championships (Junior Relay)	Alexandroupoli(s)	8
2006-06-23	European Championships (Junior)	Autun	13
2006-09-02	World Championships (Junior)	Lausanne	7
2006-10-07	Duathlon European Championships (Junior)	Rimini	6
2007-06-30	European Championships (Junior)	Copenhagen	6
2007-08-31	BG World Championships (Junior)	Hamburg	8
2007-09-09	Premium European Cup	Kedzierzyn Kozle	11
2007-10-24	Premium European Cup	Alanya	14
2008-05-10	European Championships (Junior)	Lisbon	9
2008-06-05	BG World Championships (Junior)	Vancouver	24
2008-06-12	CISM World Military Triathlon Championship	Otepää	5
2008-08-24	European Cup & Small States of Europe Championships	Weiswampach	1
2008-09-06	European Championships (U23)	Pulpí	5
2008-09-27	BG World Cup	Lorient	24
2009-04-05	European Cup	Quarteira	9
2009-05-17	Premium European Cup	Pontevedra	27
2009-06-20	European Championships (U23)	Tarzo Revine	6
2009-07-18	European Cup	Athlone	4
2009-08-09	World Cup	Tiszaújváros	28
2009-09-11	Dextro Energy World Championship Series, Grand Final: U23 World Championship	Gold Coast	8
2009-10-25	Premium European Cup	Alanya	6
2010-04-11	European Cup	Quarteira	22
2010-04-25	World Cup	Ishigaki	DNS
2010-06-27	Premium European Cup	Brasschaat	2
2010-07-10	World Cup	Holten	21
2010-09-12	Dextro Energy World Championship Series, Grand Final: U23 World Championship	Budapest	DNF
2011-04-09	European Cup	Quarteira	14
2011-05-29	Premium European Cup	Brasschaat	8
2011-07-10	World Cup	Edmonton	7
2011-07-24	CISM World Military Triathlon Championship	Rio de Janeiro	5
2011-08-14	World Cup	Tiszaújváros	37
2011-09-09	Dextro Energy World Championship Series, Grand Final: U23 World Championship	Beijing	8
2011-10-28	European Championships (U23)	Eilat	4
2011-11-06	World Cup	Guatape	27
2012-04-07	Sprint African Cup	Larache	4
2012-07-22	European Cup	Geneva	4
2012-08-25	CISM 17th Military Triathlon World Championships	Lausanne	3
2012-09-22	World Cup	Tongyeong	6
2013-07-14	World Cup	Palamos	17
2013-07-21	European Cup	Geneva	3
2013-08-25	European Cup	Carlsbad (Karlovy Vary)	3
2013-10-06	World Cup	Cozumel	7
2013-10-27	World Cup	Guatape	3

BG = the sponsor British Gas · DNF = did not finish · DNS = did not start
