= Frédéric Belaubre =

French triathlete

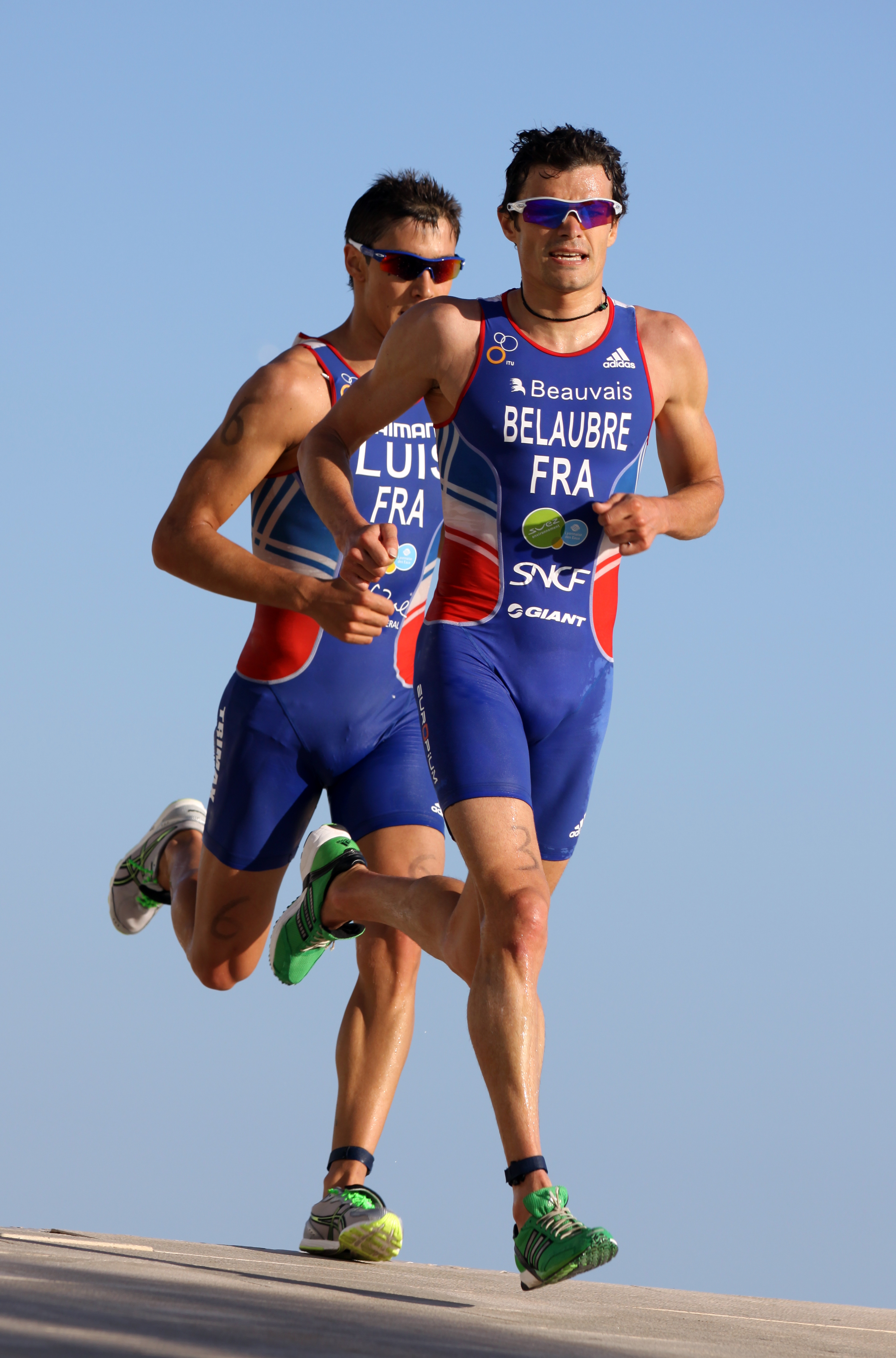
Fred Belaubre, silver medalist, ahead of gold medalist Vincent Luis in Quarteira, 2011.

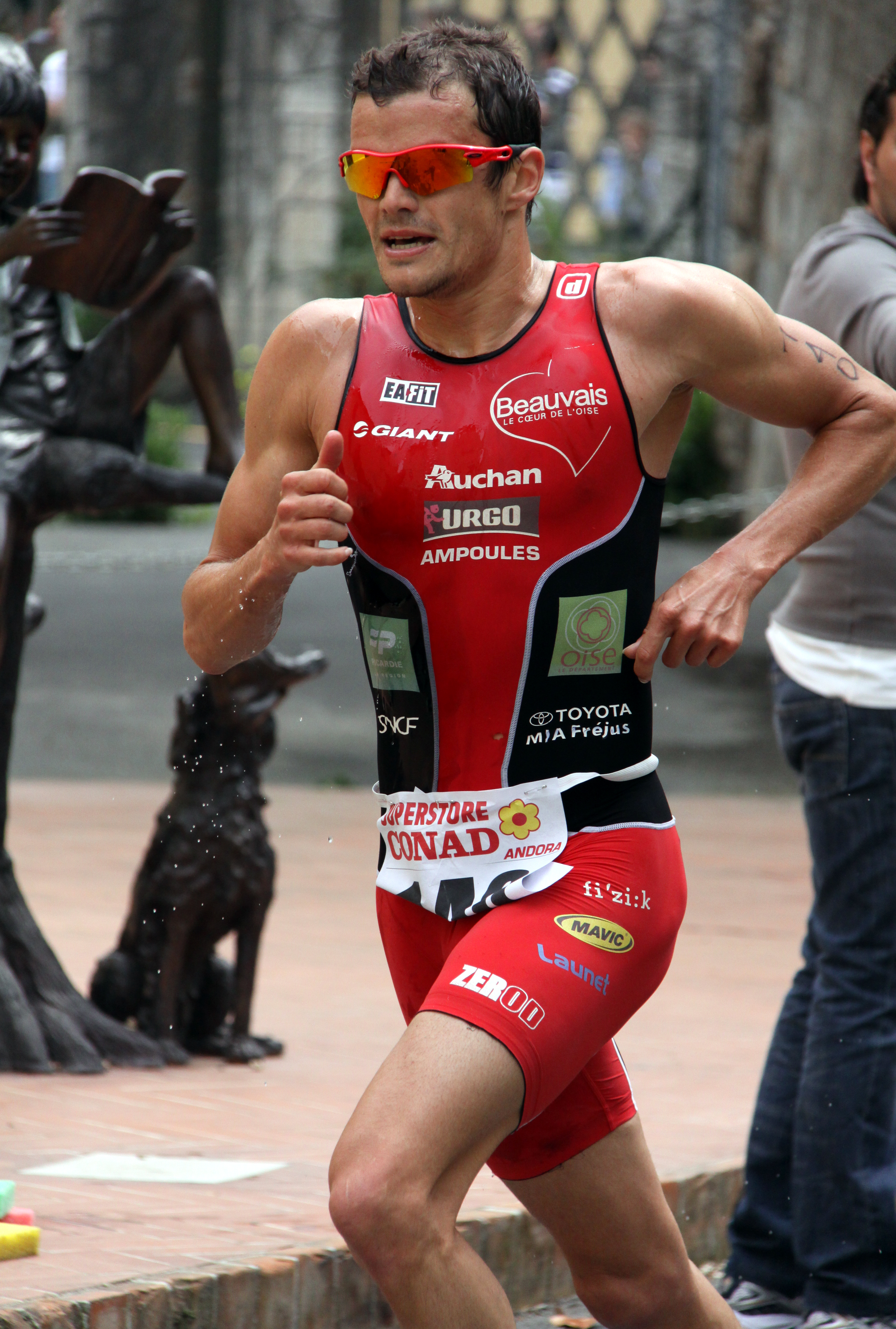
Fred Belaubre winning gold at the FITRI Triathlon in Andora, 2010.

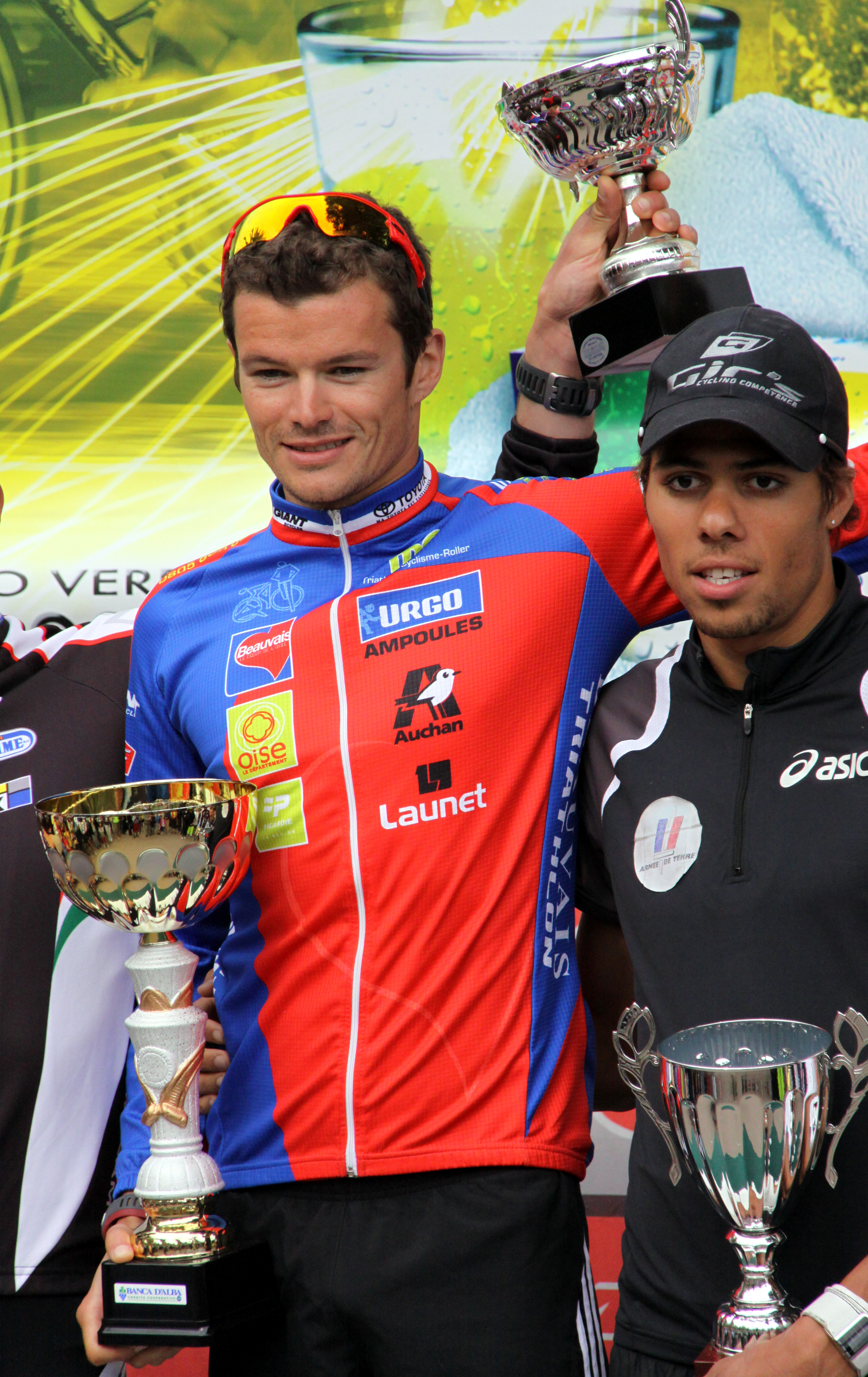
Fred Belaubre with the Andora silver medalist and teammate Aurélien Raphael, 2010.

Fred (Frédéric) Belaubre (born 14 February 1980 in Poissy), is a French professional triathlete. He was the European Champion of the years 2005, 2006, and 2008, the French Champion of the years 2007 and 2010. Belaubre took part in two Olympic Games, placing 5th in Athens (2004) and 10th in Beijing (2008).

== Sports career ==
Fred Belaubre lives in St. Raphael and is part of the nearby high performance centre CREPS PACA in Boulouris, to which he was admitted in 1996. Since 2009, as in the years 2006–2007, his coach has been Pierre Houseaux, the head of the triathlon section of the Pôle Boulouris. In France, Fred Belaubre represents the club Beauvais Triathlon, for which he could win the silver medal in the prestigious Club Championship Series Lyonnaise des Eaux in 2009. In 2010, Belaubre also represented EJOT in the German Bundesliga circuit. In 2011, when his French club Beauvais will boycott the French Club Championship series Lyonnaise des Eaux, he will again represent EJOT, like his teammate Charlotte Morel.

== Private ==
According to French press reports, Fred Belaubre and Charlotte Morel, who is also part of the elite centre CREPS PACA in Boulouris and the elite team of Beauvais, are a couple.

Fred Belaubre's father, Georges Belaubre, is also a well-known triathlete and in 2010, at the age of 66, he won the national championships in his age group (V6).

== ITU Competitions ==
Fred Belaubre started to take part in ITU events in 1999, at the age of 19. In 2000 he could win the gold medal at the Junior World Championships. From 2001 on, he has only taken part in elite competitions.

In April 2011, Belaubre opened the new season with two European Cup silver medals. In the twelve years from 1999 to 2010 Belaubre took part in 58 ITU competitions and achieved 28 top ten positions, the most recent of which in 2009.

The following list is based upon the official rankings and the athlete's ITU Profile Page. Unless indicated otherwise, the following events are triathlons (Olympic Distance) and belong to the Elite category.

Date	Competition	Place	Rank
1999-07-03	European Championships (Junior)	Funchal	4
1999-09-12	World Championships (Junior)	Montreal	5
2000-04-30	World Championships (Junior)	Perth	1
2000-07-08	European Championships (Junior)	Stein	2
2001-04-28	World Cup	St Anthonys	4
2001-05-13	World Cup	Rennes	15
2001-07-22	World Championships	Edmonton	21
2002-04-27	World Cup	St. Petersburg	6
2002-09-21	World Cup	Nice	7
2002-10-13	World Cup	Madeira	12
2002-11-09	World Championships	Cancun	27
2003-04-26	World Cup	St Anthonys	4
2003-06-21	European Championships	Carlsbad	10
2003-08-10	World Cup	New York	27
2003-09-12	World Cup	Nice	29
2003-10-19	World Cup	Madeira	35
2003-12-06	World Championships	Queenstown	8
2004-04-18	European Championships	Valencia	15
2004-05-09	World Championships	Madeira	26
2004-08-25	Olympic Games	Athens	5
2004-09-19	World Cup	Madrid	1
2005-06-05	World Cup	Madrid	29
2005-07-31	World Cup	Salford	1
2005-08-20	European Championships	Lausanne	1
2005-09-10	World Championships	Gamagori	5
2005-09-17	OSIM World Cup	Beijing	2
2006-06-04	BG World Cup	Madrid	5
2006-06-23	European Championships	Autun	1
2006-07-09	BG World Cup	Edmonton	4
2006-08-13	BG World Cup	Tiszaújváros	57
2006-09-02	World Championships	Lausanne	3
2006-09-09	BG World Cup	Hamburg	46
2006-09-24	BG World Cup	Beijing	1
2006-11-05	BG World Cup	Cancun	55
2007-06-29	European Championships	Copenhagen	7
2007-07-22	BG World Cup	Kitzbühel	2
2007-08-11	BG World Cup	Tiszaújváros	3
2007-08-30	BG World Championships	Hamburg	40
2007-09-15	BG World Cup	Beijing	9
2008-04-13	BG World Cup	Ishigaki	17
2008-05-10	European Championships	Lisbon	1
2008-06-05	BG World Championships	Vancouver	21
2008-08-18	Olympic Games	Beijing	10
2008-09-27	BG World Cup	Lorient	39
2009-04-05	European Cup	Quarteira	17
2009-05-02	Dextro Energy World Championships Series	Tongyeong	26
2009-07-02	European Championships	Holten	4
2009-07-11	Dextro Energy World Championship Series	Kitzbühel	22
2009-08-15	Dextro Energy World Championship Series	London	44
2009-09-09	Dextro Energy World Championship Series · Grand Final	Gold Coast	15
2009-10-25	Premium European Cup	Alanya	48
2010-04-11	Dextro Energy World Championship Series	Sydney	18
2010-05-08	Dextro Energy World Championship Series	Seoul	44
2010-06-05	Dextro Energy World Championship Series	Madrid	33
2010-07-25	Dextro Energy World Championship Series	London	30
2010-08-14	Dextro Energy World Championship Series	Kitzbuhel	38
2010-08-21	Sprint World Championship	Lausanne	DQ
2010-09-08	Dextro Energy World Championship Series · Grand Final	Budapest	25
2011-04-03	European Cup	Antalya	2
2011-04-09	European Cup	Quarteira	2

BG = the sponsor British Gas · DNF = did not finish · DNS = did not start · DQ = disqualified
