= Emmie Charayron =

French triathlete

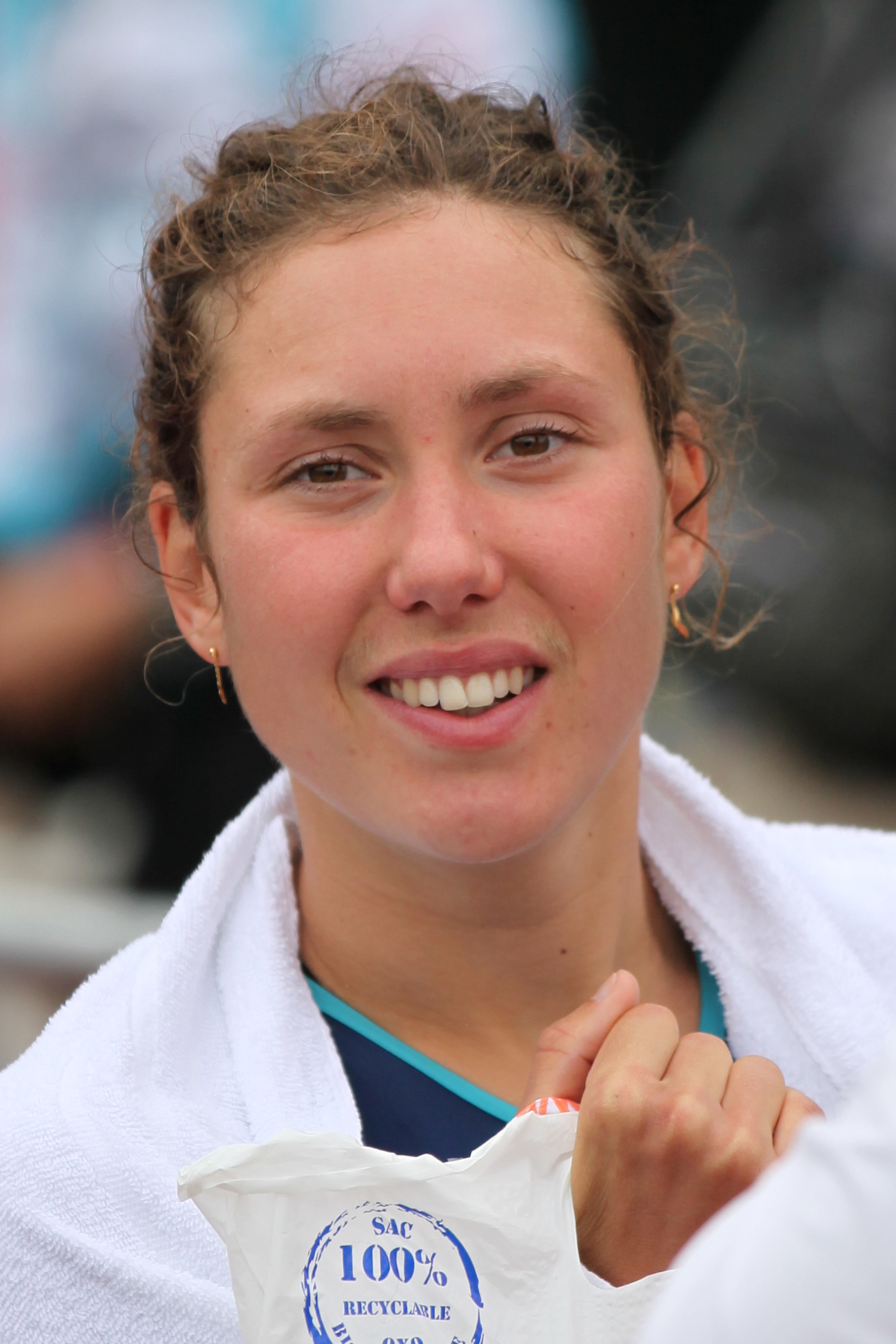
Emmie Charayron after the Grand Final of the Grand Prix de Triathlon in La Baule, 2011.

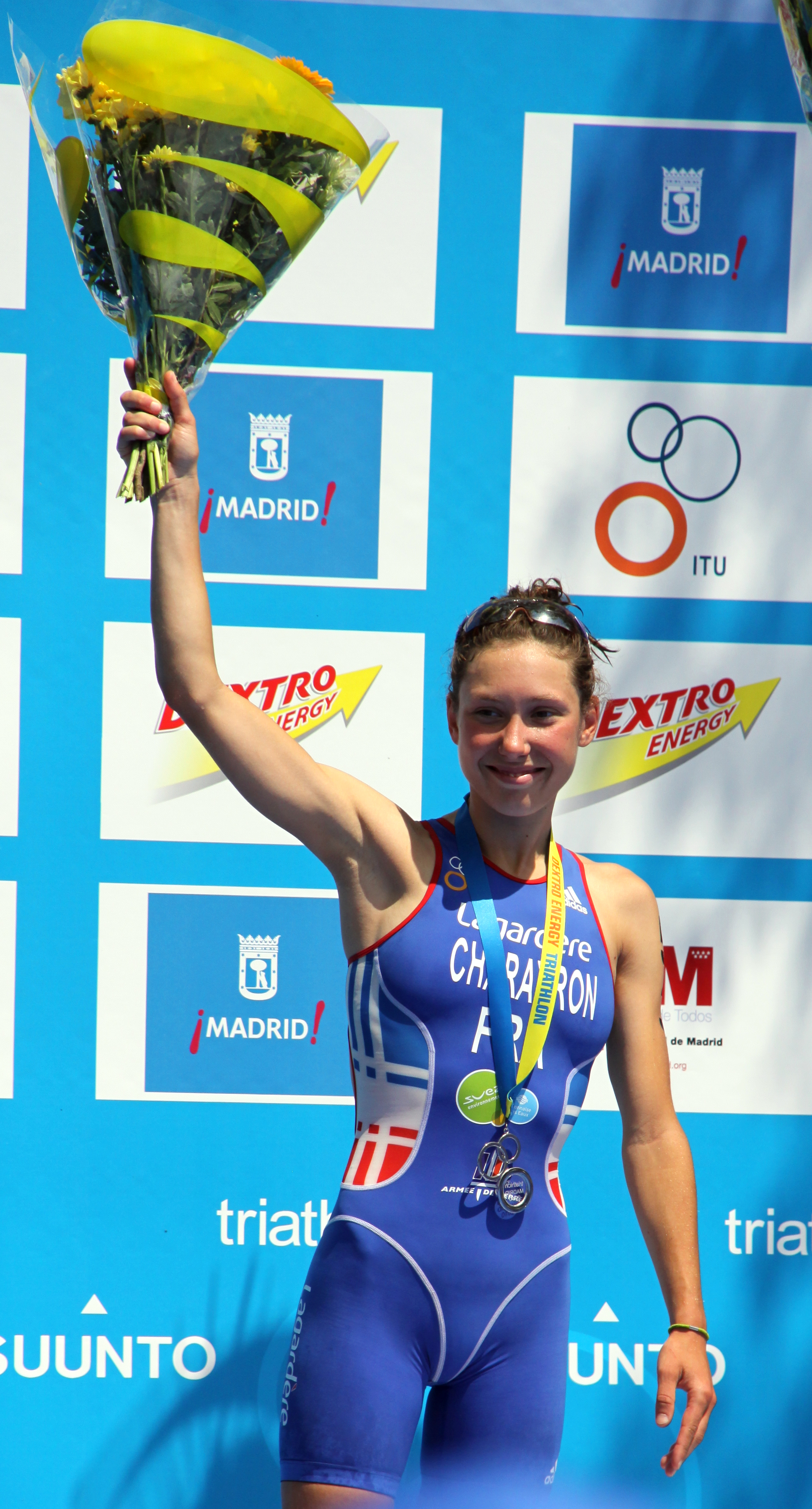
Emmie Charayron with the silver medal at the World Championship Series Triathlon in Madrid, 2010.

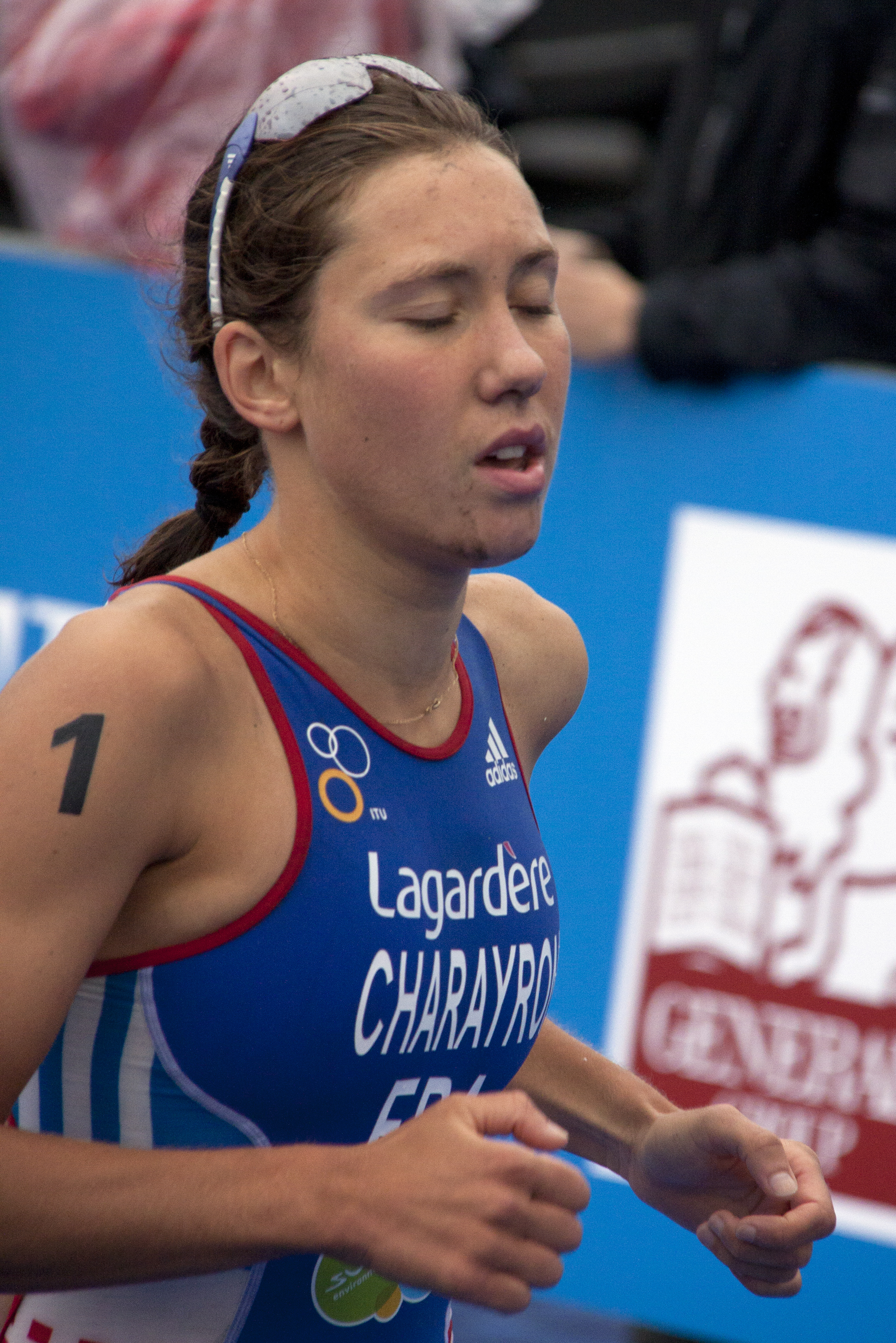
Emmie Charayron placing third at the U23 World Championship in Budapest, 2010.

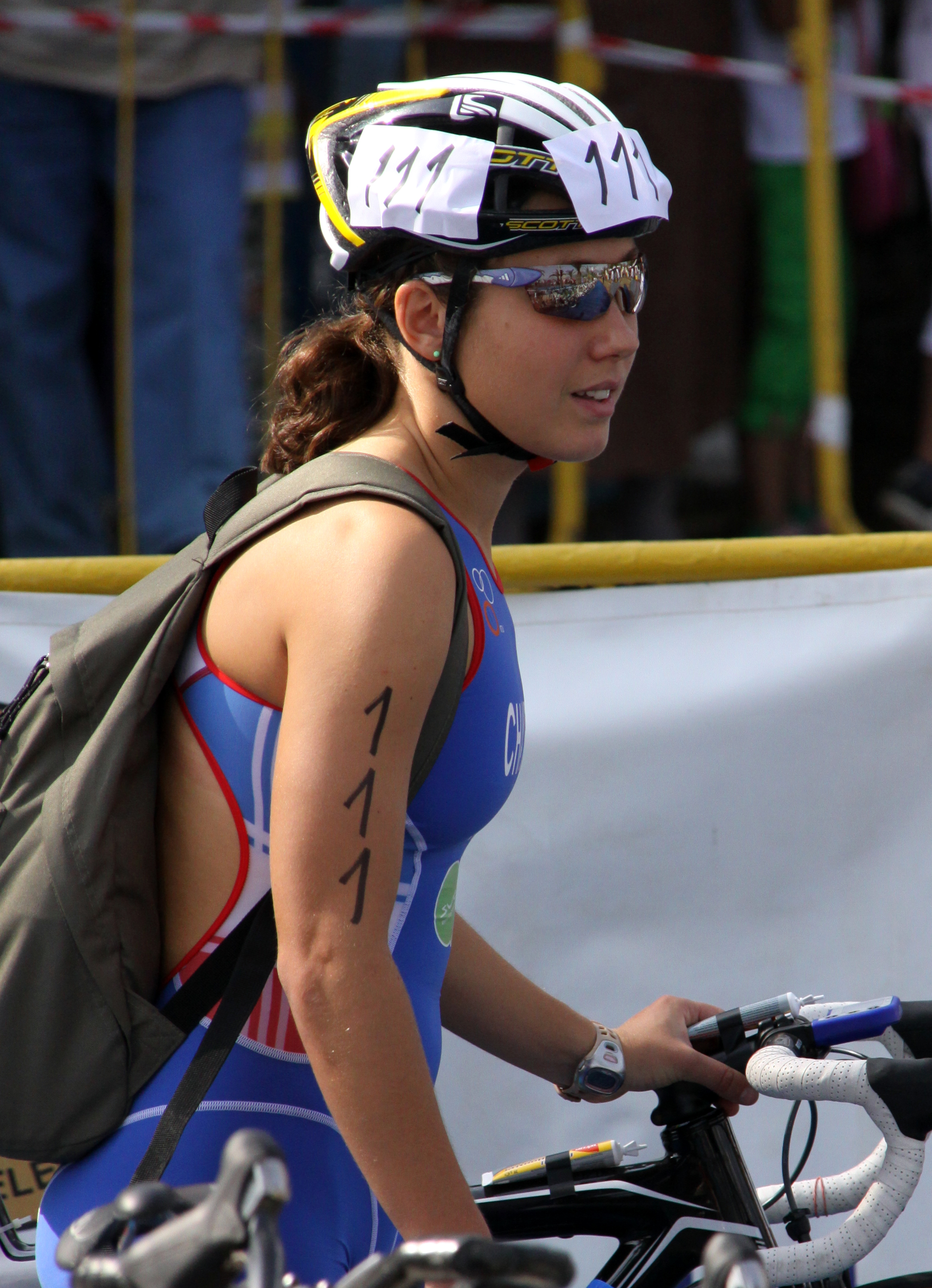
Emmie Charayron preparing for the Premium European Cup in Alanya, 2009.

Emmie Charayron (born 17 January 1990 in Lyon), also known as Emma Charayron, is a French professional triathlete, European Champion of the year 2011, ten time French Champion in various age categories, and both European and World Junior Champion in 2009, and U23 World Championship bronze medalist in 2010.

Charayron is part of ECS Triathlon club and she is also a member of the French Military Triathlon team (Equipe de France militaire de triathlon), which is part of the Ecoles militaires de Draguignan (EMD), and holds the grade soldat 1re classe.

== Sports career ==
In 1997 Emmie Charayron, who is still trained by her father Philippe Charayron, took part in her first triathlon in Vaulx-en-Velin and since then she has won ten national championships in various age categories. Since 2006 she has regularly taken part in ITU competitions, since 2007 she has regularly won gold medals and in 2008, at the age of 18, she also started to compete in the Elite class most successfully. In 2009, she not only placed first in the Junior European and the Junior World Championships, but also won medals in Elite European Cups: silver in Quarteira and bronze in Athlone.

The French media often depict Charayron, the 2009 Junior World Champion, and Charlotte Morel, the 2009 and 2010 National U23 Champion, as the rising stars to count on in international competitions, not least the Olympics in London 2012. An example of this is the leading French magazine Triathlète dedicating its famous double page column called Confrontation to Morel and Charayron in November 2009.

At the first European Cup of the year 2010 in Quarteira, Charayron placed second whilst Morel, still hampered by an injury, finished 22nd. At the World Championship Series triathlon in Madrid, Charayron won the silver medal, whereas Morel did not take part and at the U23 World Championship in Budapest Charayron won the bronze medal whereas Morel had to give up after a bike accident due to the torrential rain. At the French Championships in Charleville on 20 June 2010 Morel had won the U23 gold medal and Charayron had to settle for U23 silver.

At the French Championships in Villiers-sur-Loir on 24 September 2011, Morel again won the U23 title whereas Charayron placed second in the U23 ranking and third in the overall ranking.

== French Club Championship Series ==
Thanks to Emmie Charayron, in 2009 her French triathlon club Brive Limousin placed eighth in the prestigious French Club Championship Series Lyonnaise des Eaux and achieved this top-ten placement without hiring foreign champions. The winning club, Beauvais, however, owed its success almost exclusively to the international stars Hollie Avil, Anja Dittmer, Andrea Hewitt and Vickie Holland. Emmie Charayron took part in four of the five Lyonnaise des Eaux competitions in 2009 and in three of them she won U23 medals: in Dunkirk she placed 1st (overall 6th), in Beauvais 2nd (overall 5th), in Paris Longchamp 4th (overall 7th) and in La Baule 3rd (overall: 13th).

Thus Charyaron managed to outdo Charlotte Morel, her greatest national rival running for Beauvais, at least in the three Lyonnaise triathlons where both were in the race: Dunkirk (U23 rankings: Charayron 1st, Morel 4th), Beauvais (Charyaron 2nd, Morel 3rd), and Paris Longchamp (Charayron 4th, Morel 5th).

From 2010 to 2013 Emmie Charayron represents Lagardère Paris Racing. In 2010, however, due to her World Championship Series commitment, Charayron did not take part in the Lyonnaise competitions in France.

== ITU Competitions ==
In the five years from 2006 to 2010 Emmie Charayron took part in 24 ITU competitions and achieved 16 top ten positions, among which 11 medals. In the ITU ranking of the year 2010 (Women's Standing) Charayron was number 22 among the best 63 female U23 triathletes of the world, although she took part in only one race. The following list is based upon the official ITU rankings and the athlete's Profile Page. Unless indicated otherwise, the following competitions are triathlons and belong to the Elite category.

Date	Competition	Place	Rank
2006-06-23	European Championships (Junior)	Autun	15
2006-10-07	Duathlon European Championships (Junior)	Rimini	4
2007-06-29	European Championships (Junior)	Copenhagen	10
2007-08-30	BG World Championships (Junior)	Hamburg	16
2007-10-24	European Cup (Junior)	Alanya	1
2008-05-10	European Championships (Junior)	Lisbon	1
2008-06-05	BG World Championships (Junior)	Vancouver	22
2008-07-12	European Cup	Athlone	5
2008-09-06	European Championships (U23)	Pulpí	18
2008-09-27	BG World Cup	Lorient	18
2008-10-26	Premium European Cup	Alanya	1
2009-04-05	European Cup	Quarteira	2
2009-06-20	European Championships (U23)	Tarzo Revine	3
2009-07-02	European Championships (Junior)	Holten	1
2009-07-18	European Cup	Athlone	3
2009-08-15	Dextro Energy World Championship Series	London	15
2009-09-09	Dextro Energy World Championship Series, Grand Final: World Championships (Junior)	Gold Coast	1
2009-10-25	Premium European Cup	Alanya	8
2010-04-11	European Cup	Quarteira	2
2010-06-05	Dextro Energy World Championship Series	Madrid	2
2010-07-03	European Championships	Athlone	9
2010-07-24	Dextro Energy World Championship Series	London	14
2010-08-14	Dextro Energy World Championship Series	Kitzbühel	DNF
2010-09-11	World Championships (U23)	Budapest	3
2011-04-09	Dextro Energy World Championship Series	Sydney	35
2011-05-08	World Cup	Monterrey	10
2011-06-04	Dextro Energy World Championship Series	Madrid	3
2011-06-24	European Championships	Pontevedra	1
2011-07-16	Dextro Energy World Championship Series	Hamburg	28
2011-08-06	Dextro Energy World Championship Series	London	10
2011-08-20	Sprint World Championships	Lausanne	9
2011-08-21	Team World Championship	Lausanne	4
2011-09-09	Dextro Energy World Championship Series, Grand Final	Beijing	40
2019-05-11	2019 Sines ETU Sprint Triathlon European Cup and Mediterranean Championships	Portugal	1
2019-06-30	2019 FRA Sprint Triathlon National Championships	France	1

BG = the sponsor British Gas • DNS = did not start • DNF = did not finish
