= Pierre Houseaux =

French triathlete

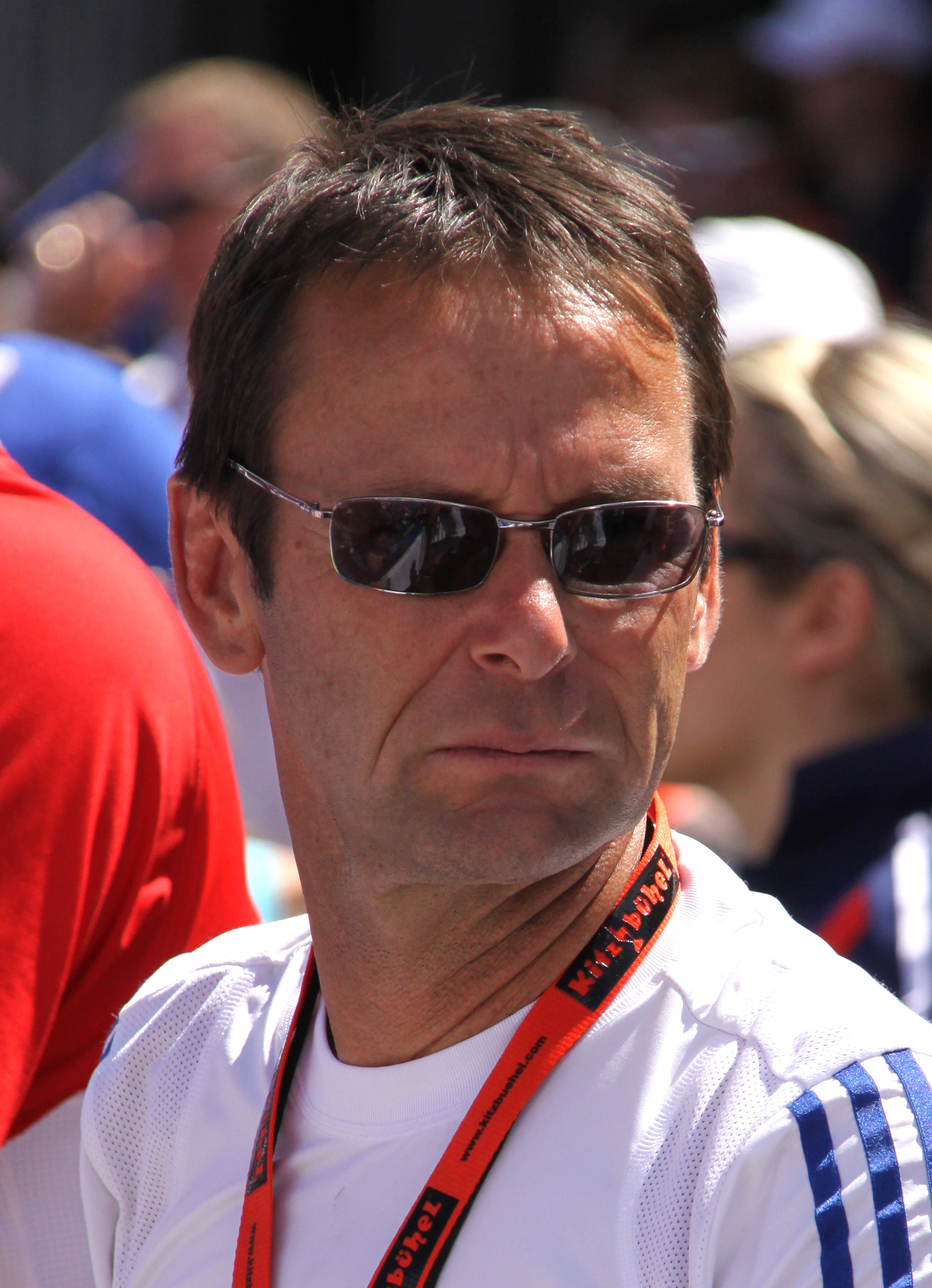
- Pierre Houseaux at the World Championship Triathlon in Kitzbühel, 2010.

Personal information
- Nationality: French
- Born: 1960 (age 65–66)

Sport
- Country: France
- Sport: Triathlon

Pierre Houseaux (born 1960) is a French Elite triathlete. For several years he has been the Long Distance National Trainer of the French Triathlon Federation (FFTRI = Fédération Française de Triathlon) and he has also been the director of the triathlon section at the High Performance Centre CREPS PACA.

Pierre Houseaux is one of the triathlon pioneers in France. In 1990, he won the Long Distance triathlon Corniche d'Or, in 1993 he won the French Long Distance Championships and placed 21st on the Short Distance at the European Championships in Echternach. In 1994 he placed 7th at the Long Distance World Championships in Nice.

In his beginners manual, Stéphane Cascua called Pierre Houseaux one of the best French triathletes.

For the last years Pierre Houseaux has been widely known for his skills as Entraîneur National and as the director of the triathlon high performance centre (pôle) in Boulouris situated in the CREPS PACA (CREPS = Centre d’Education Populaire et de Sport, PACA = Provence Alpes Côte d'Azur).

In France there are two triathlon pôles, one in Montpellier and one in Boulouris. Both have an elite section (Pôle France) and a junior section (Pôle Espoirs France).

Among Houseaux's Elite triathletes there are well-known professional triathletes like Frédéric Belaubre, Aurélien Raphaël and Charlotte Morel.

== Gallery ==
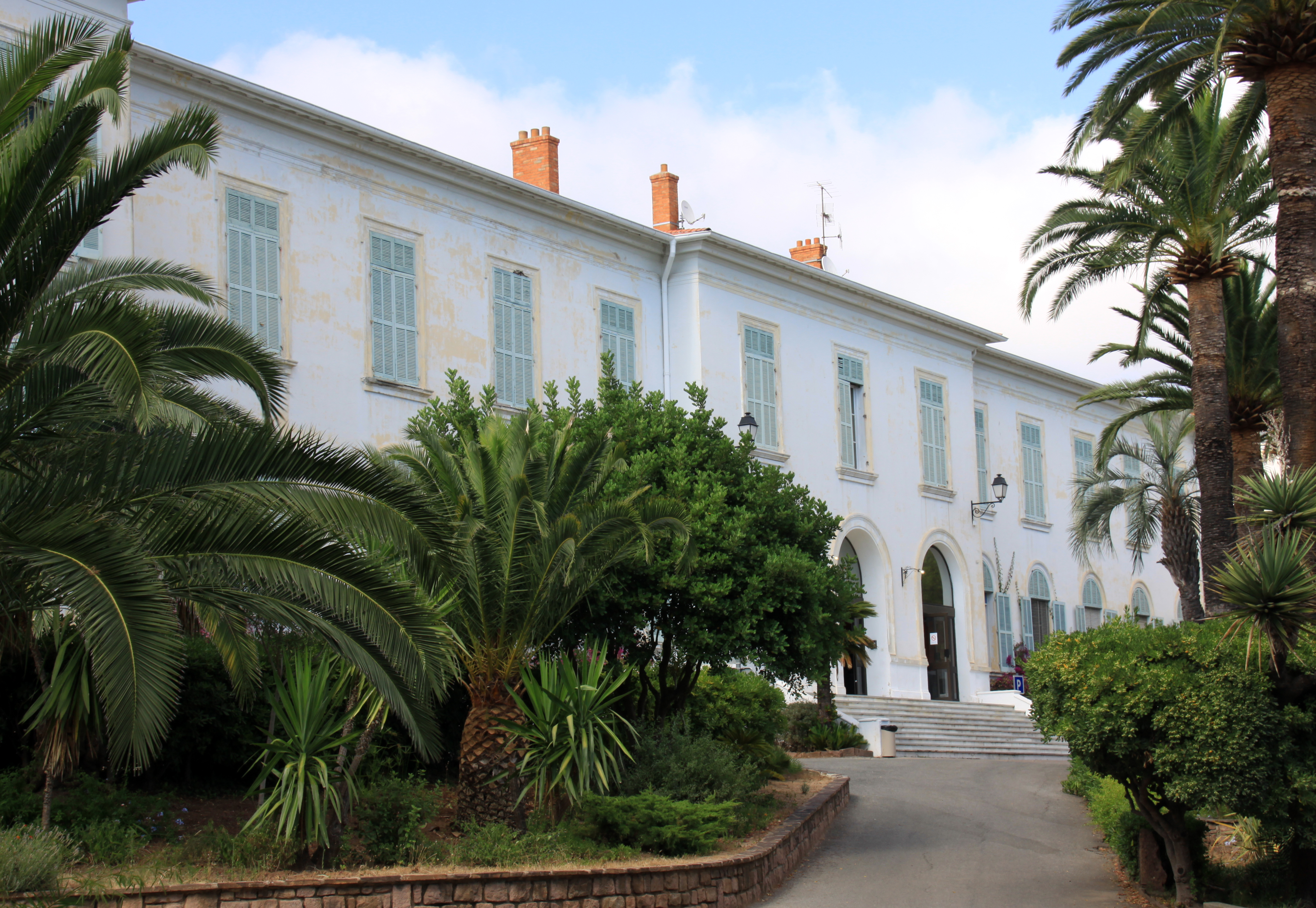
The administration building of the high performance centre CREPS PACA in Boulouris.

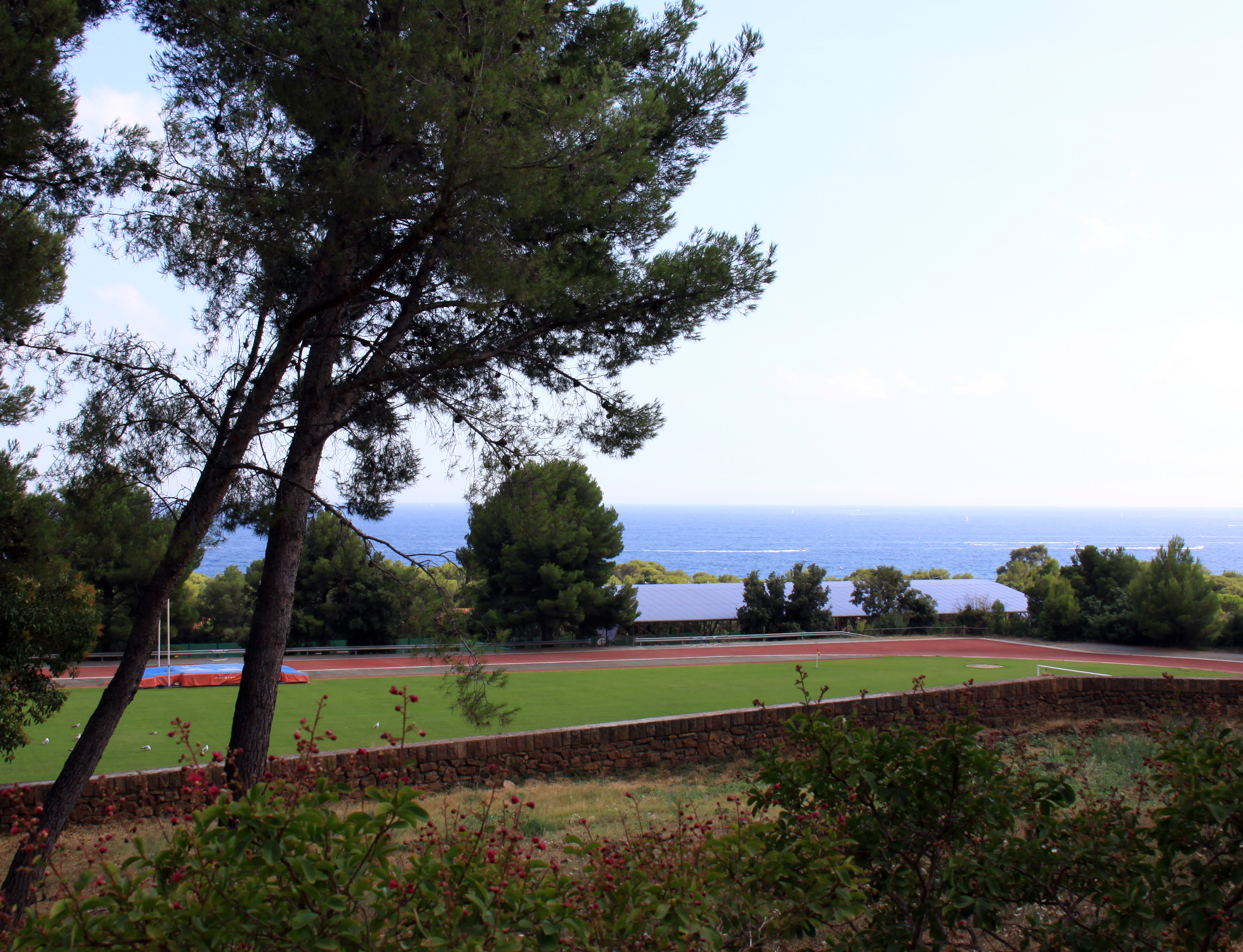
The soccer ground of the high performance centre CREPS PACA.

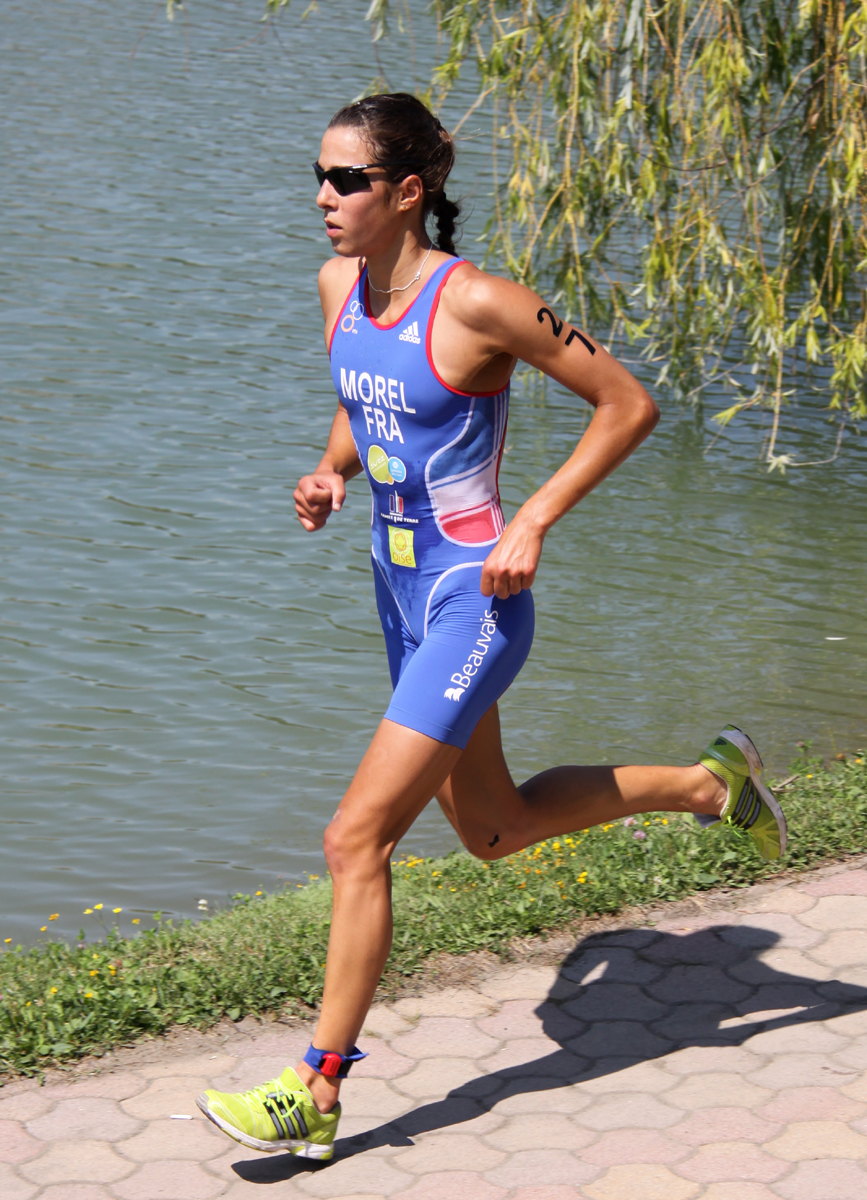
Charlotte Morel at the World Cup in Tiszaújváros, 2009.

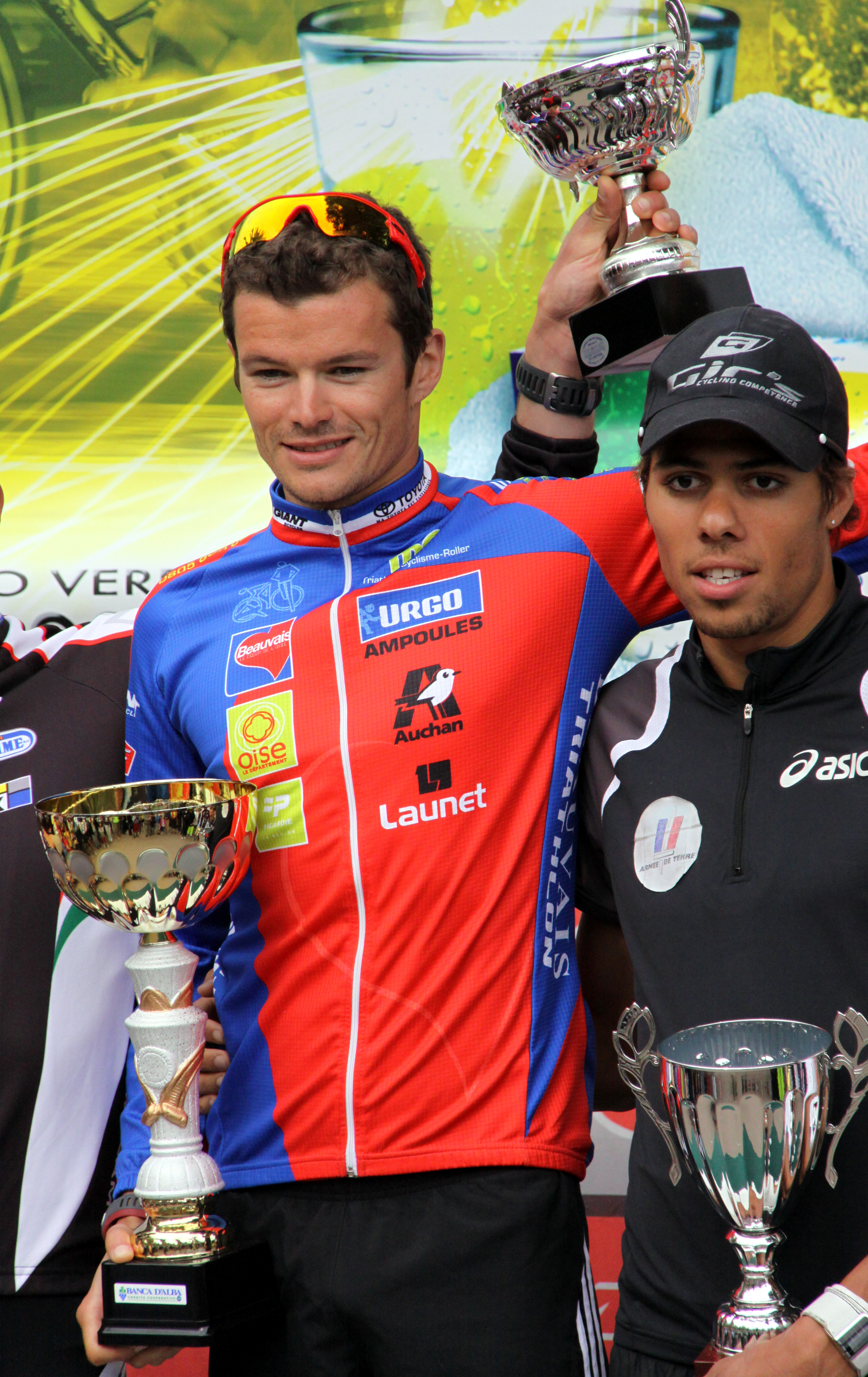
Fred Belaubre with his teammate Aurélien Raphael at the Italian triathlon in Andora, 2010.
