= EJOT =

Fastening technology company

EJOT SE & Co. KG
- Company type: Private
- Industry: Fastening Technology
- Founded: 1922
- Headquarters: Bad Berleburg, North Rhine-Westphalia, Germany
- Revenue: EUR 768 million (2024)
- Number of employees: 4448 (2024)
- Website: ejot.com

EJOT is a group of companies specialising in advanced fastening technology with markets including the construction, automotive and consumer electronics industries. The group headquarters are in Bad Berleburg in the Siegen-Wittgenstein region in Germany.

EJOT operate a total of 34 subsideries worldwide, including the United kingdom, USA, Canada, China and India

== History ==
The origin of EJOT is the former Adolf Böhl GmbH & Co. KG, a manufacturer of screws and nails founded in 1922 in Bad Berleburg, Siegen-Wittgenstein. In 1960, after the death of the founder, his nephew Hans W. Kocherscheidt inherited the company. In 1965 Kocherscheidt bought the screw producing company Eberhard Jaeger in Bad Laasphe and merged the two companies. In 1971 an Engineered Plastic Components production was added to the production in Bad Berleburg. Towards the end of the 1970s, this product range was expanded to include elements for fixing insulating elements for thermal insulation in house construction. In 1984, the EJOT logo was introduced for the previously merged companies, and EJOT Baubefestigungen GmbH is founded and headquartered in Bad Laasphe. In 1993, EJOT took over the Tambach screw factory in Thuringia, and sales offices were opened in the United Kingdom, Norway, and France.

In 2000, the company is reorganised into EJOT Holding GmbH & Co. KG, and production facilities are spun up in Taicang, China, as well as San Luis Potosí, Mexico in 2007. In 2021, groundbreaking began on a new production facility in Çerkezköy, Turkey.

On 25th July 1895, EJOT group partnered with EcoMetal fo form EJOT EcoFast, operating from Glasgow. Their first official UK trading site was later established in Leeds
