= Françoise Dorner =

French actress, screenwriter and author

Françoise Dorner (born 17 June 1949, Paris) is a French actress, screenwriter, playwright and novelist.

== Biography ==
=== Actress ===
Dorner made her cinema debut in 1975 thanks to Éric Le Hung, who cast her in one of the main roles in Raging Fists along with Philippe Lavot, Marie-Georges Pascal and Tony Gatlif, who co-wrote the script. She can be seen in 1981 in Haute surveillance by Pierre-Alain Jolivet and in 1984 with Pierre Richard in The Twin. Finally, in 1992 she played in Les amies de ma femme by Didier Van Cauwelaert with Michel Leeb, Christine Boisson and Catherine Arditi.

Although her film career remains quite modest, Dorner has been very active in television since the late 1960s. She starred in several TV movies, notably as the titular character in La Petite Fadette in 1978. In 1985, she played Commissioner Françoise Valence in the series "Madame et ses flics". She also adapted one of her plays, Le Parfum de Jeannette, for television in 1996.

=== Writer ===
Her plays L'Hirondelle and Le Parfum de Jeannette, cowritten with Jean-Claude Carrière, earned her the Prix du Jeune Théâtre Béatrix Dussane-André Roussin. In 2004, she was awarded the Prix Goncourt du premier roman for La Fille du rang derrière, critically acclaimed in France but also in the United States. In 2006, La Douceur assassine won the Prix Émile Augier awarded by the Académie française and, in 2011, she received the Prix Roger-Nimier for Tartelettes, jarretelles et bigorneaux.

== Works ==
=== Plays ===
- L'Hirondelle
- Le Parfum de Jeannette
- 2000: Bonheur Parfait

=== Novels ===
- 2004: La Fille du rang derrière (Albin Michel, Le Livre de Poche 2006, ISBN 2253117404)
- 2006: La Douceur assassine (Albin Michel, Le Livre de Poche, 2008, ISBN 2226172416) adapted to the cinema under the title Mr. Morgan's Last Love (2013) directed by Sandra Nettelbeck
- 2009: Magic Retouches (Albin Michel, ISBN 2226188770)
- 2011: Tartelettes, jarretelles et bigorneaux (Albin Michel, ISBN 2226221379)

== Theatre ==
- 1967: Le Duel by Anton Chekhov, directed by André Barsacq, Théâtre de l'Atelier
- 1975: Des journées entières dans les arbres by Marguerite Duras, directed by Jean-Louis Barrault, Théâtre d'Orsay
- 1976: Antigone by Jean Anouilh, directed by Nicole Anouilh, Théâtre Firmin-Gémier Antony: Antigone
- 1980: Diderot à corps perdu, directed by Jean-Louis Barrault, Théâtre d'Orsay: Mademoiselle de Lespinasse
- 1981: Madame est sortie by Pascal Jardin, directed by Pierre Boutron, Tournée Herbert-Karsenty
- 1987: Le Nègre by Didier van Cauwelaert, directed by Pierre Boutron, Tournée Herbert-Karsenty
- 1988: Avanti ! by Samuel A. Taylor, directed by Pierre Mondy, Théâtre du Palais-Royal: Diana Claiborn
- 1991: Ornifle ou le Courant d'air by Jean Anouilh, directed by Patrice Leconte, Théâtre des Bouffes Parisiens

== Filmography ==
=== Actress ===
Cinema

- 1975: Raging Fists, by Éric Le Hung: BB la brune
- 1975: Émilienne, by Guy Casaril: Diane
- 1975: Flic Story, by Jacques Deray: Suzanne Bollec
- 1978: En l'autre bord, by Jérôme Kanapa: une mère
- 1981: Haute surveillance, by Pierre-Alain Jolivet: Claire Mazarine
- 1984: Le Jumeau, by Yves Robert: Marie
- 1985: Gros Dégueulasse, by Bruno Zincone: la fille aux boucles d'oreilles
- 1989: L'invité surprise, by Georges Lautner: Julie
- 1990: Feu sur le candidat, by Agnès Delarive: Marie-Diane
- 1992: Les amies de ma femme, by Didier Van Cauwelaert: Hélène

Television

- 1966: L'affaire Lemoine, episode of the series En votre âme et conscience by Claude Barma: Angélina Lemoine
- 1967: Les Cinq Dernières Minutes Voies de fait by Jean-Pierre Decourt
- 1967: Le Somnambule, episode of the series L'amateur ou S.O.S. Fernand by Jean-Pierre Decourt: Denise
- 1967: Le Fabuleux Grimoire de Nicolas Flamel, episode of the series Le Tribunal de l'impossible by Guy Lessertisseur: Jeanneton
- 1969: L'Auberge de Peyrebeilles, episode of the series En votre âme et conscience by Guy Lessertisseur: Angélina Lemoine
- 1969: Le Petit Monde de Marie-Plaisance, TV series by André Pergament: Christine
- 1971: La Mort des capucines, TV movie by Agnès Delarive: Arielle
- 1971: La Possédée, TV movie by Éric Le Hung: Sœur Calixte
- 1972: Les Mal-Aimés, TV movie by Pierre Vallet: Marianne de Virelade
- 1972: Das Mädchen aus Bourgneuf and Strauchritter auf der Messerstraße, two episodes of the series Die Melchiors by Hermann Leitner: Lucienn
- 1973: Le Temps de vivre, le temps d'aimer, miniseries by Éric Le Hung: Catherine
- 1974: Les Enfants des autres, TV series by Louis Grospierre: Lise
- 1974: Amoureuse Joséphine, TV movie by Guy Lessertisseur: Laure Junot
- 1974: Le Soleil de Palicorna, TV movie by Philippe Jouillat: Sandra
- 1975: Les Exilés, TV movie by Guy Lessertisseur: Béatrice
- 1976: La Pêche miraculeuse, miniseries by Pierre Matteuzzi: Antoinette Galland
- 1978: La Petite Fadette, TV movie by Lazare Iglesis: Fadette
- 1979: Miss et la vie en rose, episode of the series Miss: Sabine
- 1979: Crapotte, episode of the series Les Amours de la Belle Époque by Agnès Delarive: Crapotte
- 1979: La Belle vie, by Jean Anouilh directed by Lazare Iglesis: La femme de chambre
- 1980: Lundi, episode of the series Cinéma 16 by Edmond Séchan: Mme Martin
- 1981: L'Antichambre, by Hervé Bromberger: Wanda
- 1981: Le Bouffon, by Guy Jorré: Françoise
- 1982: Je tue il, episode of the series Cinéma 16 by Pierre Boutron: Mlle Trinquier
- 1982: L'Accompagnateur, TV movie by Pierre Boutron: Mme Guimont-Villiers
- 1982: La Marseillaise, TV movie by Michel Berny: Isabelle
- 1983: Fabien de la Drôme, TV series by Michel Wyn: Julie
- 1983: Quelques hommes de bonne volonté, miniseries by François Villiers: Mathilde
- 1983: Les Enquêtes du commissaire Maigret, episode: Un Noël de Maigret by Jean-Paul Sassy: Mme Martin
- 1984: La Jeune Femme en vert, by Lazare Iglesis: Flore
- 1985: Madame et ses flics, TV series: Le commissaire Françoise Valence
- 1989: Le Nègre, by Yves-André Hubert: Clémentine
- 1990: Avanti, TV movie by Patrick Bureau: Diana Claiborn
- 1994: L'Homme de mes rêves, TV movie by Georges Lautner: Guillemette Deslandes
- 1995: L'Affaire Dreyfus, TV movie by Yves Boisset: Berthe
- 1995: Les Grandes Personnes, TV movie by Daniel Moosmann: la gynécologue
- 1995: La Duchesse de Langeais, TV movie by Jean-Daniel Verhaeghe:
- 1996: Le Parfum de Jeannette, TV movie by Jean-Daniel Verhaeghe: Jeanette
- 1997: Le Président et la garde barrière, TV movie by Jean-Dominique de la Rochefoucauld: Madame Deschanel
- 1998: Les Pédiatres, miniseries by Hartmut Griesmayr and Daniel Losset
- 2003: La Faux, TV movie by Jean-Dominique de la Rochefoucauld: Agnès
- 2004: Enfance volée, episode of the series La Crim': Mme Filipani

=== Screenwriter ===
- 1996: Le Parfum de Jeannette TV movie by Jean-Daniel Verhaeghe, coadaptation of her play with Jean-Daniel Verhaeghe and Jean-Claude Carrière
- 1997: Une Femme sur mesure TV movie by Detlef Rönfeldt, cowritten with Marianne Sägebrecht
- 1999: La Secrétaire du Père Noël, directed by Dagmar Damek
- 2012: Mr. Morgan's Last Love, cowritten and directed by Sandra Nettelbeck, adaptation of Françoise Dorner's novel La Douceur assassine

== Dubbing ==
- 1973: Aminata by Claude Vermorel
- 1978: Goin' South: Julia Tate Moon (Mary Steenburgen)
- 1981: Halloween II: Karen Bailey (Pamela Susan Shoop)
- 1983: Scarface: Elvira Hancock (Michelle Pfeiffer)
- 1983: Trading Places: Penelope Witherspoon (Kristin Holby)
- 1984: Police Academy: Sgt Debbie Callahan (Leslie Easterbrook)
