= Yvonne Pitrois =

French author

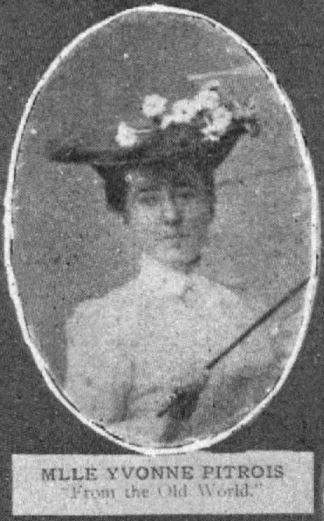
- Born: 14 December 1880; Paris
- Died: 23 April 1937
- Resting place: cimetière des Tilleuls

Yvonne Pitrois (14 December 1880 – 23 April 1937) was a French writer. She wrote a variety of popular books, including multiple biographies of historical figures. Deaf from childhood, Pitrois advocated for the welfare of deaf and deafblind people in her work, including the founding of two magazines featuring advice and inspirational stories about deaf people. She was awarded the Montyon Prize in 1929 for her lifelong efforts in support of the deaf and deafblind community.

== Early life and education ==
Yvonne Pitrois was born on 14 December 1880 in Paris. Born hearing, she lost her hearing at age seven after a bout of fevers caused by severe heat stroke. Her eyesight was also damaged after this illness; her vision deteriorated from age seven through twelve, but she eventually recovered some sight.

Her mother, a teacher and writer who ran a bilingual French-English school, educated Pitrois at home. Pitrois read French and English fluently and was able to read lips in both languages.

== Writing career ==
Beginning at age seventeen, Pitrois translated works from England and America into French, and published articles in periodicals in France, England, Switzerland, and the United States. She was a regular contributor to the U.S. newspaper The Silent Worker, including a column titled "From the Old World" sharing information about deaf institutions in Europe. She used this platform to highlight the work of other deaf women, including French author Marie Lenéru.

Pitrois published her first book, a collection of stories about humble lives titled Jeunes vies, at age eighteen. Her book Abraham Lincoln, le libérateur des esclaves was published in three editions. Other books included Ombres des femmes, a collection of biographies of famous women, and Cherie, an idyll for young women. Her most famous work, a biography of Abbé Charles-Michel de l'Épée, was published in 1912 on the 200th anniversary of Épée's birth.

She published and edited La Petite Silencieuse, a magazine for deaf girls and young women, from 1912 until her death in 1937. The bimonthly magazine featured advice for young deaf people as well as biographical sketches of contemporary deaf people. Pitrois wrote letters to each of the 900 subscribers. In 1928 Pitrois founded a second magazine, Le Rayon de Soleil des Sourds‐Aveugles, written in French Braille for the deafblind. Most of the magazine's issues were dedicated to sharing information and ideas among the deafblind community.

Pitrois's biography of Helen Keller, Une nuit rayonnante, was published in 1922. Pitrois and Keller were acquainted through the Cosmopolitan Correspondence Club, a deaf letter writing exchange for people in the Western world. Since Pitrois had experienced deafblindness as a child, and because she was a deaf woman writer, she was well placed to write about Keller's life. Pitrois wrote with empathy and strong admiration of Keller, though she critiqued Keller's performances on the vaudeville circuit as being an offensive spectacle.

She was a member of the Société des gens de lettres, a French writers' society. She helped obtain books and periodicals about deafness for the library of Selwyn Oxley, an English educator whose collection of books would be the foundation of the University College London Ear Institute and Action on Hearing Loss Libraries.

== Service to the deaf community ==
During World War I, Pitrois organized collections of financial support to help deaf people who were left without food or shelter by occupying German armies. She wrote about the suffering of the deaf community in France and Belgium during the war in The Silent Worker, requesting funds from American readers. In her column, she translated letters and featured photographs of the recipients of those grants. She helped reunite deaf refugees with their families and placed deaf children in school programs. Pitrois received a Medal of Honor from the Société nationale d'encouragement au bien in 1920 and was awarded the Prix Montyon in 1929 from the Académie Française for her work in improving the lives of deaf and deafblind people. The Académie Française made her an officer for her literary work.

After the end of the war and the death of her mother, Pitrois welcomed orphaned or troubled deaf girls and young women to live with her in her rural cottage in Brittany.

She died in France on 23 April 1937.

== Selected publications ==
- Coeurs aimants. Genève : J.H. Jeheber, 1905
- La fille de Victor Hugo. Lausanne : G. Bridel, 1906
- Abraham Lincoln, le libérateur des esclaves. Toulouse : Société d'édition de Toulouse, 1911
- La vie de l'Abbé de L'Epée : racontée aux sourds-muets. Saint-Étienne : L'Institution des Sourds-Muets, 1912
- Une noble victime : Miss Edith Cavell. Paris, 1915
- Les femmes de la Grande Guerre 1914-1915-1916. Genève : J.-H. Jeheber, 1916
- Ombres de femmes. Lausanne : Payot, 1929
- Veillée de Noël : Cinq récits pour les petits et pour les grands. Strasbourg : Librarie évangélique, 1932
