= Suzanne Lavaud =

French librarian

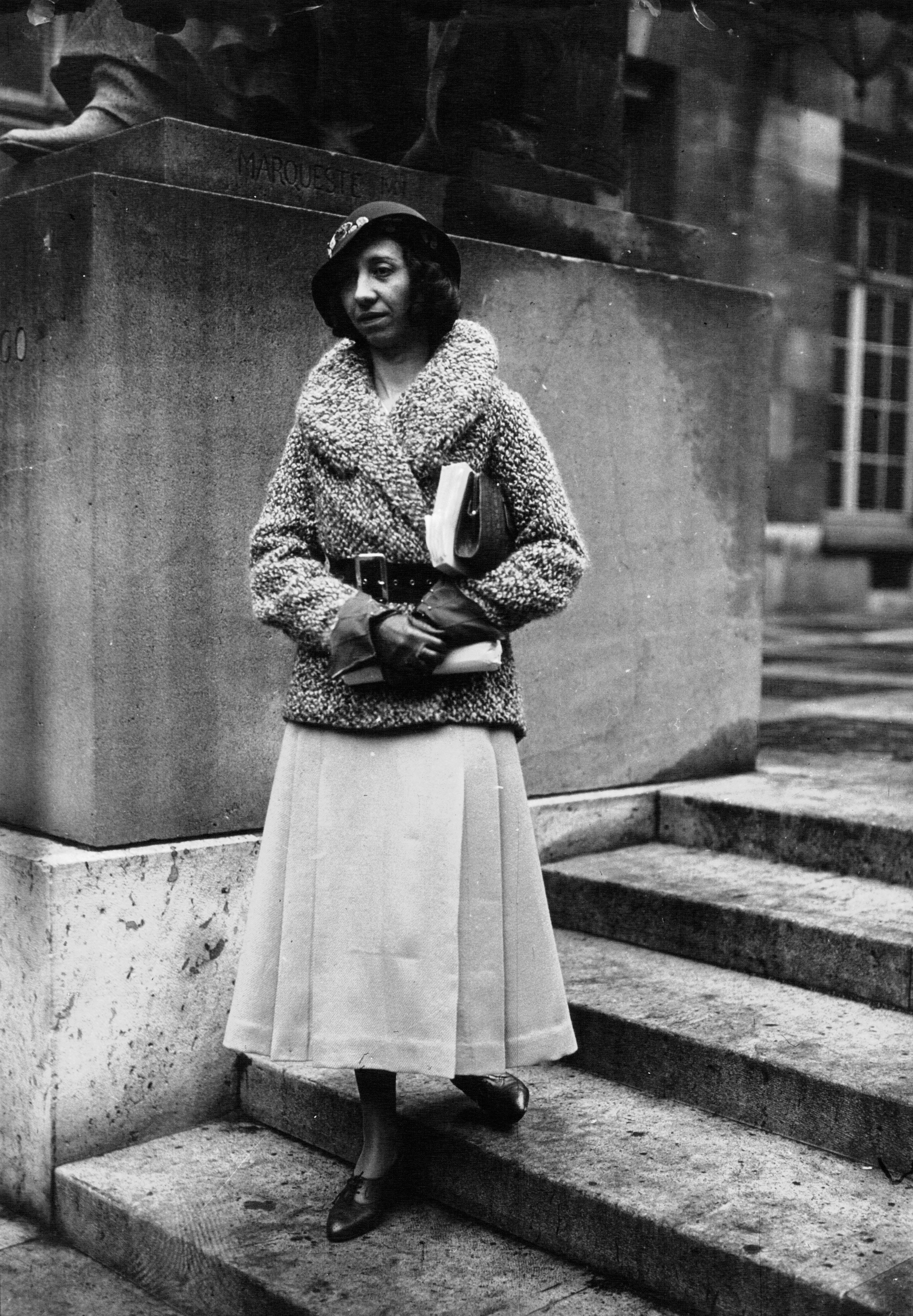
- Lavaud in 1932 on the day of her doctoral defense
- Born: August 8, 1903; Puy-en-Velay, France
- Died: January 14, 1996 (aged 92); Nice, France

Suzanne Lavaud (August 8, 1903 – January 14, 1996) was a French librarian. The first deaf person in France to obtain a Doctor of Letters, she is best known for her analysis of the writing of Marie Lenéru.

Lavaud was born in Puy-en-Velay, France, on August 8, 1903. Her mother was the principal of Lycée Victor Duruy and her father the principal of Lycée Charlemagne. Deaf from birth, Lavaud was taught by her parents how to follow conversations as a child by lipreading. She graduated with a masters of art in history from the Faculté d’Aix-en-Provence at the age of 22.

Lavaud was the first to significantly study the work of Marie Lenéru. Lenéru, a French writer and dramatist, became deaf and blind after contracting the measles as a child. Lavaud orally defended the thesis for her Doctor of Letters, "Marie Lenéru, sa vie, son journal, son theatre," at the Sorbonne on January 8, 1932. She was assisted by her mother, who repeated questions from the examiners when their movements or enunciation made lipreading a challenge. As a speaker unable to hear her own voice, Lavaud had a unique speaking style that was commented on in news coverage about her defense. Professor Félix Gaiffe noted that despite a hoarse and monotonous timber, the defense was delivered with intelligible ease. While coverage in Le Temps said that she spoke clearly with a "convincing vivacity" and spoke with authority about her area of expertise. Lavaud passed the defense with honorable mention and expressed a desire to work in a library when asked by journalists what she planned to do next.

Following graduation, Lavaud worked as a librarian at the Sorbonne. She also served as France's representative with the World Federation of the Deaf. Lavaud was the third deaf woman to become a member of Société des gens de lettres, after Yvonne Pitrois and Louise Asser.

She died in Nice on January 14, 1996.

== Awards ==
- Montyon Prize (1932)

== Select publications ==
- Marie Lenéru : sa vie, son journal, son théâtre (Thesis). SOCIÉTÉ FRANÇAISE D'ÉDITIONS LITTÉRAIRES ET TECHNIQUES. 1932.
- "The French Deaf Under the German Occupation". The Silent Worker. 2 (10): 13–14. June 1950.
