= Véra Starkoff =

- Born: Tauba Efron; 1 April 1867; Russia
- Died: 19 March 1923 (aged 55); Paris, France
- Resting place: Montaparnasse Cemetery
- Education: University of Geneva
- Occupations: Playwright, feminist, anarchist

Véra Starkoff (1 April 1867 – 19 March 1923) was a French playwright, anarchist, and feminist born in Russia-occupied Poland. Born under the name Tauba Efron to a wealthy Jewish family, she moved to Geneva, Switzerland to study in 1884. She moved to Paris, France in 1889, where she resided until her death on March 19, 1923.

Starkoff was significantly involved in the People’s University (Université Populair) movement that emerged in Europe during the early 20th century. She staged and directed plays that included feminist ideals and advocated the working-class to receive an education. Her work in this movement provided the groundwork for establishing the "popular theater" in Paris. She used the theater to express her political ideas about the working class, women’s rights, marriage, and humanism.

She established one of the People's University branches and was engaged with the Union Fraternelle des Femmes, writing for a feminist newspaper, La Fronde. She worked with the Théâtre du Peuple, and her plays, written for working class-audienced and tied to Université Populair, were politically charged. Her two major works were L’amour libre (1902) and L'Issue (1903).

Starkoff was an ardent follower of Leo Tolstoy's works and philosophies, citing his work as the basis for much of her religious and philosophical beliefs. In Starkoff's nonfiction works, she drew on Tolstoy’s philosophies about beliefs of humanism and Christian anarchism as support for her arguments against repression and violence in all forms. She wrote a number of political and philosophical essays and articles for newspapers like Le Populaire, a socialist newspaper based in France.

She was a critic of the Russian Revolution. While she supported aspects of Communist thought, the Soviets’ methods of violent repression, like the Red Terror, conflicted with her deeply held pacifist views stemming.

== Early and family life ==
Véra Starkoff was born on April 1, 1867 to a wealthy Jewish family in Poland, which was then under Russian occupation. Her birth name was not Véra Starkoff; she was born under the Jewish name Tauba Efron. When Starkoff was young, anti-semitic sentiment was prevalent across Eastern Europe. Her immediate family converted to Protestantism as a means to avoid persecution.

Starkoff's family was closely involved in politics and in the literary world. Taube Wilner, her grandmother, was believed to be descended from Vilna Gaon, a prominent rabbi born in the Polish-Lithuanian Commonwealth in 1720. Ilya Efron, her father, founded a publishing house in Saint Petersburg, Russia. The publishing house published books covering topics on cultural, social, and economic issues. The most notable book published by Efron’s publishing house was the Brockhaus-Efron Encyclopedia, an extensive multi-volume encyclopedia written in Russian. Akim Effront, her uncle born in 1855, was thought to be associated with the Russian government and was even believed to have been a Tsarist spy. When Starkoff died in 1923, she and Akim shared a grave in Montaparnasse Cemetery in Paris. During the late 19th century, her other uncle, Jean Effront, was arrested for his revolutionary involvement and was forced to leave Russia as a result. In 1889, other members of her family were investigated by the Tsarist police who had reason to believe that the Efron family was collaborating with Vera Davidovna Gurari, a labor organizer and Russian revolutionary figure.

In 1884, when Starkoff was seventeen years old, she moved to Switzerland to study philology at the University of Geneva. While she attended the university, she went by the name Thérèse Efron. During this time, it was common for young Russian women to leave Russia or Russian-occupied countries to study in different countries. After completing her studies in Geneva, Starkoff moved to Paris in 1889, the year her family was investigated by the Tsarist police in Russia, and remained there until her death in 1923.

Starkoff's first marriage was to Léon-Paul Nicod in 1892. Nicod attended the École Pratique des Hautes Études and became an agrégé of grammar. He later taught at the Lycée Stanislas in Paris and was known for his work in editing various verses that were published in 1917 by Adam de la Halle, a French poet. Starkoff and Nicod had two children together. Although no records have been found discussing their second child, the couple had a boy named Jean. In 1901, when Jean was eight years old, Starkoff and Nicod divorced.

The year of her second marriage is unknown, but she married Robert-Adolphe Schutz, an author and artist.

== Universities and development of theatre ==
Starkoff played a prominent role in establishing People's Universities across France—institutions that offered working-class individuals access to free education. She was placed in charge of one of the first people's universities, though the specific institution and year she was appointed are unknown. Starkoff's work in the development of these universities was notable, as she used theater as a means to educate individuals by staging her own plays as well as those of other similar artists.

Each people's university featured a congress of about one hundred members. However, only nine were acknowledged as founding women or representatives. This small group of women held positions of leadership, authority, and influence at these institutions. Starkoff was part of this group from 1900 to 1904. She served as a representative for the popular university located in Montreuil-sous-Bois known as "Workers' Evenings." As a representative, Starkoff's role included staging plays and readings that dealt with feminist ideas. She directed works such as Henrik Ibsen’s A Doll's House and Nelly Roussel's Eve's Fault. Starkoff's first play, Free Love, was dedicated to the "Worker's Evenings." Similarly to Starkoff, other women, such as Jeanne Desparmet-Ruello in Lyon, took part in the creation of people's universities. Although the goal of the people's universities was to provide accessible education for working-class individuals, there were numerous debates about these institutions. In 1904, a division occurred between the founding women of these universities. One side, known as the "Auguste Comte tendency," believed that education should be universal and moral. The other side, with which Starkoff aligned, thought that education should empower workers to participate in social and political struggles.

Starkoff's work in the people's universities laid the foundation for the establishment of the "popular theater" in France. During the late 19th and early 20th century, her plays, and those written by other women such as Louise Michel, Nelly Roussel, Madeleine Pelletier, and Marie Lenéru, were disseminated across Europe. These women used the theater as a means of spreading their political ideas. Instead of writing novels or essays about their ideas, they strategically chose the theater because of its ability to reach and move an illiterate audience. For Starkoff, the theater was a way for her to convey her beliefs about the working-class and connect these ideas to the people's university. In addition to being a playwright, Starkoff directed her plays, and often directed her friends' plays. She staged plays written by Jacques Nayral and Han Ryner. From time to time, she also acted in her friends' plays. Starkoff played a role in Les Vaincues, a play written by Poinsot and Normandy that condemned the oppressive conditions faced by women embroiderers and seamstresses who worked from home.

Although many of these women's plays were censored at the time of their publication, archives have preserved the plays, allowing others to read, interpret, and understand their political messages.

== Theatrical works ==
During the early twentieth century, Starkoff wrote and directed plays that showcased her feminist and political beliefs. She was inspired by Leo Tolstoy, Alexander Pushkin, Henrik Ibsen, and the L'Université Populaire to use theater as a means to convey her ideas to a live audience in France. She wrote numerous plays in the first decade of the twentieth century, but her most notable were L'Amour libre (1902), L'Issue (1903), Le Petit verre (year unknown), Tolstoïenne (year unknown), and Le Concierge antisémite (year unknown). All five were performed across France, gaining traction and a sizable audience.

In 1909, Starkoff founded the Théâtre de l'Idée, where her play Tolstoïenne was regularly performed. Her role in the theatre was significant, as her plays delved into issues that were often overlooked by prominent politicians and members of society. Rather than attacking or denouncing these individuals, she provided a platform where these issues could be openly discussed.

Although it is unknown when she began using her pseudonym, Véra Starkoff, all of her theatrical works were published under this name. Starkoff's real name was never discovered during her lifetime. In Russian, the name Véra means "faith," and Starkoff contains the root "old" and also means "star." The Russian translation of Véra is significant, as faith may refer to one of the three Christian theological virtues (the other being hope and charity). The Russian translation of Starkoff is thought to refer to Leo Tolstoy. The name she chose for herself was a Russian-sounding name, yet hid her Jewish roots and familial origins. The pseudonym name revealed Starkoff's deep interest in maintaining her Russian culture as well as her desire to immerse herself into her new French life.

In 1902, when Starkoff was thirty-five years old, she wrote her first play, L'Amour libre (Free Love). In this play, she dealt with topics such as marriage, children, the middle and working classes, and the patriarchal society. Most importantly, L'Amour libre challenged the traditional beliefs regarding marriage, as she advocated for the rights of unmarried women and children born out of wedlock. To Starkoff, the institution of marriage symbolized the bourgeois class, even arguing that it was better for a woman to raise her child as a single mother rather than to be part of the bourgeois system. Thus, her play featured an open and friendly dialogue between the two main characters, Blanche and Ruinet, as they spoke about the importance of love, bearing children out of wedlock, the institution of marriage, and union libre. Starkoff's decision to structure her play as an open exchange drew a wide audience, including members of the middle class, allowing them to understand different perspectives, ideological positions, and political beliefs. In Scene III, Blanche is upset due to a past relationship with a man to whom she was not married and with whom she had a child. Yet, she decides to leave those feelings in the past, moving on and raising her child alone. Blanche’s decision mirrors Starkoff's idea of leaving the traditional, patriarchal ideals in the past and adopting a new social norm and identity. This idea was expressed in an article she published in La Fronde, where she addressed the significance of abandoning the traditional patriarchal system. Moreover, her play explored the idea that love and marriage were not the same, aligning her with Madeleine Vernet, a French teacher and pacifist. Ultimately, L'Amour libre gained popularity due to its rhetoric about women's rights, the connection between marriage and love, and children born out of wedlock.

Starkoff’s second play, L'Issue (The Only Way Out), was published in 1903. It was longer, more dramatic, and gained more popularity than L'Amour libre. Due to its popularity, it was translated into Italian and was known as La Via d'Uscita, bozetto sociale. Starkoff drew inspiration from Henrik Ibsen, drawing on themes of women’s emancipation and utilitarianism. The play follows Lucy, a 22 year old woman who was born into a bourgeois family. Lucy reaches the age where tradition requires her to become married. Yet, Lucy feels uncomfortable with this tradition, rejecting it and choosing her own independence instead. As in her other plays, Starkoff highlights differing perspectives, specifically around women’s rights and marriage. L'Issue allowed individuals to grasp women’s inner conflict as they choose to move away from longstanding traditions imposed onto them by society.

Although information about Starkoff's other plays are scarce, scholars acknowledge that her plays influenced large audiences in Europe during the twentieth century.

== Non-fiction works ==
This list of Starkoff's work is non-exhaustive, as most of her works have not been digitized or translated. The first non-fiction work for which she is credited is an essay titled "Siberia," dated 1899. This essay, like many of her non-fictions works, is difficult to locate physically or find where it was originally published. This essay established her continued interest in Russian culture and its people despite her absence from the nation.

The next non-theatrical work she produced was Le Vrai Tolstoi, or The Real Tolstoy, published in 1911. In this essay, Starkoff clarified what she believes are common misconceptions about Tolstoy and his philosophy. She emphasized his opposition to established organized Christianity and his adherence to a more primitive form. She also denied his family's claims that Tolstoy had accepted the Orthodox church upon his deathbed. She referenced his anti-clericalism as evidence for this. She claimed that, in fact, he was a "Christian Anarchist", i.e., a person who rejected institutionalized power like that of the Church. She called this the "Faith of the Old Man."

In 1918, Starkoff wrote a short essay titled "C'est Tolstoï qui triomphe" ("It is Tolstoy who triumphs"). This piece praised the Soviets' efforts to extricate themselves from World War I. The title was derived from Starkoff's intense pacifism, which stemmed from her adherence to Toltosy's philosophies.

Starkoff published "Les Origines profondes du communisme russe" ("The Deep Origins of Russian Communism") in the socialist newspaper Le Populaire in 1919. This article explored the origins of Russian communism, drawing connections to historical practices in Russia, such as community land ownership and village self-governance. Starkoff connects these to the Soviets’ approach, but she also voices critiques of the Bolsheviks.

Her final nonfiction work, Le Bolchevisme, a short book around seventy pages, was released in 1922. In this work, Starkoff critiqued the Bolsheviks, condemning their violent methods. She argues that violent repression was a bourgeois method and that there should be a unilateral disarmament, citing her adherence to Tolstoy’s philosophy.

Almost none of Starkoff's non-fiction works have been officially translated and published in English, and are quite difficult to find actual copies of, digital or physical.

== Russian Revolution and Tolstoy ==
Starkoff was a follower of Leo Tolstoy’s philosophies, a Russian writer and fervent Christian anarchist and pacifist. Starkoff's overall political thought was consistently tied to Tolstoy's, with her dedication to humanism and non-violence. She frequently referred to him in her writings. Many of these essays, articles, and plays focused on Tolstoy's philosophies or applied them to contemporary events. She described Tolstoy’s view of religion as one of humanism or humanity, not one of the Church.

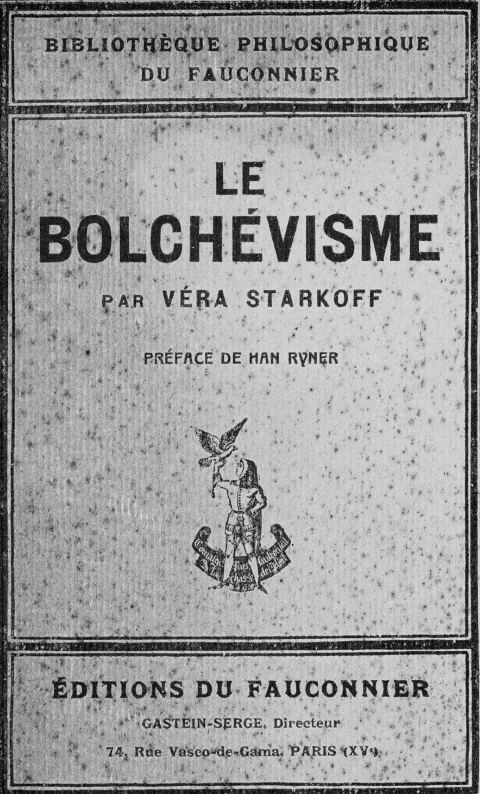
Starkoff's book Le Bolchévisme

Starkoff interpreted Tolstoy's works and philosophies as being opposed to all forms of exploitation, repression, and violence. She argued that his practice of Christian Anarchism, the separation of faith from any organized or institutional church, was a revolutionary idea. Tolstoy's philosophy of anarchist and humanist thought permeated Starkoff's theatrical work as well. They can be seen in her mission for popular theatre to spread knowledge to the general populace, rather than serve as a monopoly for the privileged. She aspired for theatre to promote political ideals in line with these philosophies, specifically as they reflected her revolutionary egalitarian and feminist ideals, such as free love and the rejection of masculine and paternal authority. She was also consistently anti-state, aligning this position with her overall anarchist thought, which she claimed was based on Tolstoy's philosophies, thereby connecting to her feminist beliefs and arguments.

Starkoff had a shifting and complicated relationship with the October Revolution in 1917 and the early Communist government that emerged after. Initially, in 1917, she supported the revolution, speaking at a celebration of it organized by an all-women's Freemason lodge. Her pacifism, which she attributed to Tolstoy’s influence, led her to praise the Soviets for their efforts to end World War I. However, by 1919, she was becoming disillusioned with the Bolsheviks. In her book Le Bolchévisme, Starkoff criticized the Red Terror campaign. She claimed that any success the Soviets had so far was due to a limited application of Tolstoy’s philosophies, and they were diverging too far from his teachings. Starkoff's initial celebration of the Russian revolution and eventual denouncement show the ideological development she underwent and her commitment to humanist and pacifist ideals.

== Personal and organizational affiliations ==
Through her writing, playwrights, and activism, Starkoff drew inspiration from various notable figures and organizations. She was influenced by key feminist figure, Olympia de Gouges, a French writer, political activist, and playwright. Like Starkoff, Gouges believed that the Church and the bourgeois class were prohibiting women from gaining full liberation. Taking inspiration from Gouge's discussion of women's rights, Starkoff claimed that women had not been granted equal rights after the French Revolution, emphasizing it in her work.

As a journalist for La Fronde, a feminist newspaper, Starkoff helped portray women on stage. In fact, she published an article in 1903 in the newspaper, where she spoke about how she donated two copies of her play, L’amour libre, to the French League for Women’s Rights (LFDF) organization. Starkoff was a member of this organization, which aimed to attain political and social equalities for women. In the article, she also pushed forth a reform that would grant women the right to a divorce. Her membership in the Union Fraternelle des Femmes (UFF), a feminist association in France, fostered inspiration for her writing and plays.

In May of 1901, Starkoff became a freemason after being initiated into the Diderot Lodge and officially joined on June 21, 1901. The Diderot Lodge of the Grand Symbolic Scottish Lodge had been founded in 1880 by twelve lodges of the Supreme Council of France. From 1903-1905, she served as the general secretary of the organization. This organization was influential, as at the end of the 19th century, it was one of the few that allowed women to join into freemasonry. It also helped found the Grand Lodge of France, which initiated Maria Deraismes and Louise Michel. After the lodge disappeared in 1911, Starkoff joined the lodge "Le Libre examen adoption" on January 23, 1913. She remained part of this lodge during World War I and the Russian Revolution. Before she denounced the Russian Revolution, she celebrated the February Revolution in May 1917 as a member of this lodge.

Aside from her work as a freemason, Starkoff participated in other organizations. In December 1906, Starkoff spoke at the food hygiene congress, where she presented a proposal for a Proletarian Children’s Fund. She wished to establish a fund where a portion of income tax could be allocated for the working mother’s child. She ensured that her proposal included both married and not married women. Further, she was a member of the Fraternal Union of Women, where she offered proposals and gave lectures. During her time with this organization, she suggested that freethinking include women’s demands and defended the need for women and men to be treated as equals. Starkoff gave two widely discussed lectures at this organization: "Freethought and Art" and "Freethought and Feminism." Starkoff was a strong believer in free thought, becoming a member of "La Libre Pensée" ("Free Thought").

== Bibliography ==
- Auffret, Séverine, and Georges Vayrou, "Une Militante à (Re)Découvrir: Véra Starkoff (1867-1923)," Cahiers d’histoire (Espaces Marx (Association)), no. 143 (2019): 103-17.
- Cecilia Beach, Staging Politics and Gender: French Women’s Drama, 1880–1923, (London: Palgrave Macmillan, 2005).
- Eugenia Charoni, From Motherhood and Marriage to Symbolist Theater and Revolutionary Politics: French and Spanish Women’s Theatre, 1890's to 1930's (Cincinnati: University of Cincinnati, 2013).
- Sébastien Gandon, "Jean Nicod: Familial Background and Pacifist Commitment." Russell 43, no. 1 (2023): 66-82.
- Sonya Stephens, A History of Women's Writing in France (Cambridge: Cambridge University, 2000).
- Tomasz Kaczmarek, Francuski teatr kontestacji społecznej na przełomie XIX i XX wieku. Bunt kobiet (Louise Michel, Véra Starkoff, Nelly Roussel) (Łódź: Wydawnictwo Uniwersytetu Łódzkiego, 2022).
