= L'Homme idéal =

L’Homme idéal
- Directed by: Xavier Gélin
- Written by: Xavier Gélin; Pascal Légitimus; Dominique Chaussois
- Screenplay by: Xavier Gélin; Pascal Légitimus; Gilles Niego
- Story by: Xavier Gélin; Pascal Légitimus; Dominique Chaussois
- Starring: Pascal Léegitimus; Christophe Malvoy; Daniel Russo
- Cinematography: Jean-Claude Aumont
- Edited by: Yves Deschamps
- Production companies: PolyGram Audiovisuel; France 2 Cinéma; C.A.P.A.C.; Hugo Films
- Distributed by: PolyGram Film Distribution
- Release date: 17 September 1997
- Running time: 99 minutes
- Country: France
- Language: French

L’Homme idéal is a 1997 French film directed by Xavier Gélin.

== Synopsis ==
Marie, incapable of choosing between three marriage proposals, decides to give up. Circumstances make the three suitors meet. Far from being hostile, Stéphane, Fabrice and Paul console each other....

== Cast ==
- Pascal Légitimus as Stéphane
- Christophe Malavoy as Fabrice
- Daniel Russo as Paul
- Amélie Pick as Marie
- Zabou Breitman as Madeleine
- Fanny Cottençon as Claire
- Mylène Demongeot as Guillemette
- Christine Boisson as Nicole
- K-mel as Grégoire
- Marie Fugain as Sabine
- François Berléand as The Balto's man
- Rita Lafontaine as Lucie's mother
