= La fille de Carilès =

1874 children's novel by Joséphine Colomb

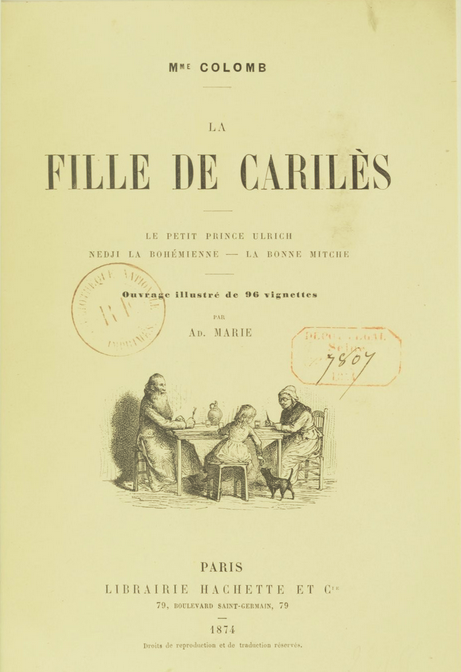
- Frontispiece from 1874 edition of La fille de Carilès
- Author: Joséphine Colomb
- Genre: children's literature
- Publisher: Hachette editions
- Publication date: 1874
- Awards: Montyon Prize

La fille de Carilès is a French-language children's book written by Joséphine Colomb and published by Hachette editions in Paris, 1874. The story first appeared in one of Hachette's magazines before reappearing in book form. Colomb received the Montyon Prize in 1875 for this work.

== Plot ==
In the tale of La Fille de Carilès, Carilès is an old man who lives in a wretched garret, and gains his living by selling whirligigs of coloured paper well known that time to little children in France and England. He is alone in the world, very poor, slovenly and lazy, thoroughly contented with his lot until he finds himself responsible for a little girl who has escaped from the cruel hands of some mountebanks. The gradual interest which he feels in the orphan, the self-denying tenderness which underlies the crust of selfishness and idleness that has grown over the solitary old man, and the sunshine which his adopted daughter brings into his life is charming, recalling in a degree, Silas Marner. Not the least well-imagined part of the story is the way in which a family of the middle class, far from rich, lend a hand to bring up and educate "La fille de Carilès", who, does not turn out to be some stolen princess, and remains to make a home for the good old man when age comes upon him.
