= Juliette Heuzey =

French writer (1865–1952)

Juliette Heuzey Goyau
- Born: 1 January 1865; Le Havre, France
- Died: 7 July 1952 (aged 87); Bernay, Eure, France
- Resting place: Père Lachaise Cemetery, Paris, France
- Occupation: writer
- Spouse: Georges Goyau (d. 1939)
- Writing career
- Pen name: Jules-Philippe Heuzey; J.Ph. Heuzey; Mme. Georges Goyau
- Language: French
- Genres: novels; biography
- Notable work: Les actes de Diotime
- Notable awards: Montyon Prize

Juliette Heuzey (French pronunciation: [ʒyljɛt øzɛ]; after marriage, Goyau; pen names, Jules-Philippe Heuzey, J.Ph. Heuzey, Mme. Georges Goyau; 1 January 1865 – 7 July 1952) was a French writer. She was a recipient of the Montyon Prize.

== Biography ==
Juliette Heuzey was born 1 January 1865, in Le Havre. Her parents were Jules Philippe Heuzey and Irma (Deschamps) Heuzey.

Besides popular novels, she wrote Dieu premier servi. Georges Goyau : sa vie et son, in memory of her husband, the academician Georges Goyau (1869–1939). Her books were signed under various names including, "Jules-Philippe Heuzey", "J.Ph. Heuzey", and "Mme. Georges Goyau". In 1897, she was awarded the Montyon Prize by the Académie Française for, Les actes de Diotime, de Jules-Philippe Heuzey.

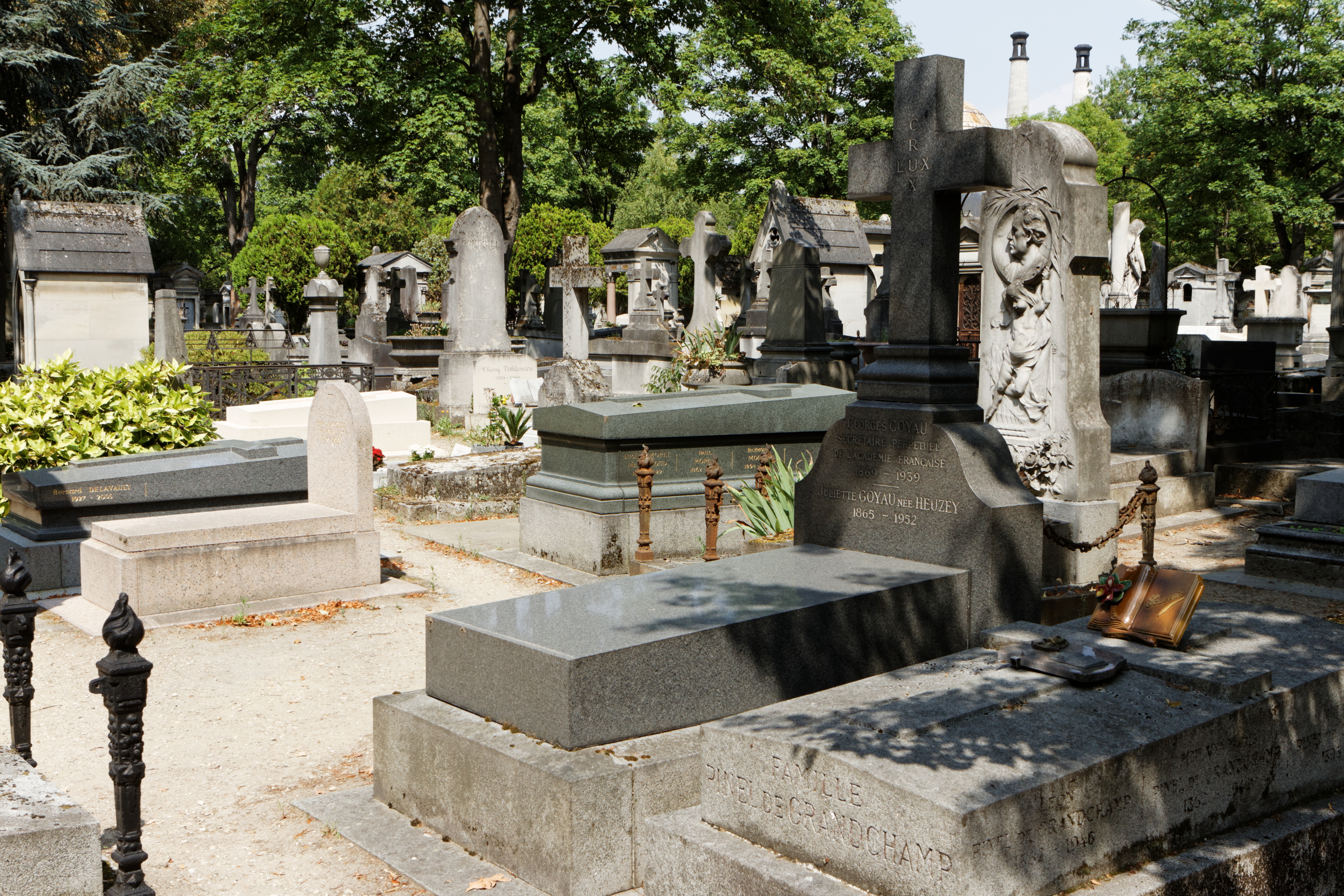
Tomb of Juliette Heuzey and her husband, Georges Goyau.

Juliette Heuzey-Goyau died 7 July 1952, in Bernay, Eure. She is buried in the Père Lachaise Cemetery (section 44). Her writings are held by the Departmental archives of Yvelines (166J, Ms 4910, 1 piece, 1932).

== Awards ==
- 1897, Montyon Prize, Académie Française

== Selected works ==
- Les actes de Diotime, 1896
- Un monastère persécuté, au temps de Luther, les Mémoires de Charité Pirckheimer, 1905
- Leur victime, 1909
- La Normandie et ses peintres, 1909
- Le Chemin sans but, 1919
- Les Dominicole, 1928
- L'Amour qui sépare, 1932
- La Victoire d'Arlette - Collection Stella, no. 126, 1933
- Une mère qui s'évade, 1934
- Ceci a tué cela, 1936
