= William Marx =

French literary critic and writer

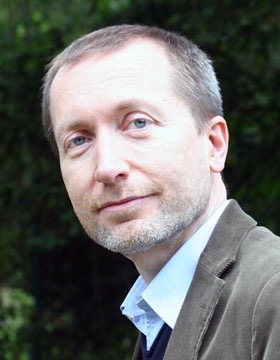
William Marx

William Marx (born 1966 in Villeneuve-lès-Avignon) is a French writer and researcher of literature. He is a researcher at the Collège de France, where he is professor of Comparative Literature. In 2010 he received the Montyon Prize of the Académie française. In 2022 he was elected a member of the Academia Europaea.

== Publications ==
- La Haine de la littérature. Paris: Éditions de Minuit. 2015. ISBN 9782707329172.
- The Hatred of Literature. Translated by Elliott, Nicholas. Cambridge, Massachusetts: The Belknap Press of Harvard University Press. 2018. ISBN 9780674976122.
- The Tomb of Oedipus: Why Greek Tragedies Were not Tragic. Translated by Elliott, Nicholas. London-New York: Verso Books. 2022. ISBN 9781788736138.
- Libraries of the Mind. Princeton: Princeton University Press. 2025. ISBN 9780691267425.
- A Scholar's life. Translated by Elliott, Nicholas. London: Hermits United. 2026. ISBN 9781916658202.
