= Joseph Droz =

French writer

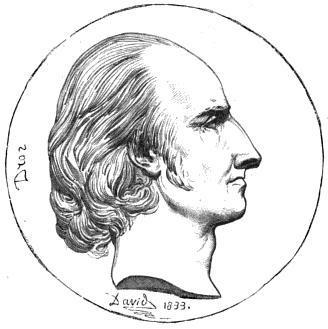
Joseph Droz

François-Xavier-Joseph Droz (French pronunciation: [dro]; 31 December 1773 – 9 November 1850) was a reactionary French writer on ethics, political science and political economy.

== Biography ==
He was born at Besançon, where his family had supplied many notable members of the legal profession. Droz's own legal studies led him to Paris in 1792; he arrived the day after the dethronement of King Louis XVI, and was present during the massacres of September. On the declaration of war he joined the volunteer battalion of the Doubs, and for the next three years served in the Army of the Rhine. Discharged on health grounds, he obtained a much more congenial post in the newly founded école centrale of Besançon; and in 1799 he made his first appearance as an author by an Essai sur l'art oratoire (Paris, Fructidor, An VII.), in which he acknowledges his indebtedness more especially to Hugh Blair.

Moving to Paris in 1803, he became friendly not only with the like-minded Ducis, but also with the sceptical Cabanis; and it was on this philosopher's advice that, in order to catch the public ear, he produced the romance of Lina, which Sainte-Beuve has characterized as a mingled echo of Florian and Werther.

Like several other literary men of the time, he obtained a post in the revenue office known as the Droits runis; but from 1814 he devoted himself exclusively to literature and became a contributor to various journals. Already favorably known by his Essai sur l'art d'être heureux (Paris, 1806), his Éloge de Montaigne (1812), and his Essai sur le beau dans les arts (1815), he not only gained the Montyon Prize in 1823 by his work De la philosophie morale ou des différents systèmes sur la science de la vie, but also in 1824 obtained admission to the Académie française.

He died in Paris.

== Thought ==
The main doctrine that this treatise seeks to inculcate is that society will never be in a proper state until men have been educated to think of their duties and not of their rights. It was followed in 1825 by Application de la morale à la politique, and in 1829 by L'économie politique ou principes de la science des richesses, a methodical and clearly written treatise, which was edited by Michel Chevalier in 1854. His next and greatest work was a Histoire du règne de Louis XVI in three volumes (Paris, 1839 1842). As he advanced in life, Droz became more and more decidedly religious, and the last work of his prolific pen was Pensées sur le christianisme (1842). In the words of Sainte-Beuve, "he was born and he remained all his life of the race of the good and the just."

== Legacy ==
Joseph Droz is quoted by Peter Kropotkin in his history of the French Revolution, when people were allowed to tour the oubliettes of the royalty, and, according to Joseph Droz, people were horrified at what they saw, and that even given this, "that in the Bastille there were even worse things to be seen."
