= Joséphine Colomb =

French writer (1833–1892)

- Born: Joséphine-Blanche Bouchet; 4 February 1833; La Roche-sur-Yon, France
- Died: 17 September 1892 (aged 59); Villerville, France
- Occupations: children's writer; lyricist; translator
- Spouse: Louis-Casimir Colomb (m. 1859; died 1890)
- Writing career
- Pen name: Mme J. Colomb; Mme Louis-Casimir Colomb
- Language: French; Italian
- Notable works: La fille de Carilès; Ensemble de son œuvre
- Notable awards: Montyon Prize; Jules-Favre Prize

Joséphine Colomb (née, Bouchet; 4 February 1833 – 17 September 1892) was a 19th-century French children's writer, lyricist, and translator who signed her works, Mme J. Colomb or Mme Louis-Casimir Colomb. She was a recipient of the Montyon Prize (1875) for La fille de Carilès. In 1893, she was a recipient of the Jules-Favre Prize. Colomb died in 1892.

== Biography ==
Joséphine-Blanche Bouchet was born in La Roche-sur-Yon (Vendée), 1833. Her parents were Louis (1785-1866), a doctor of medicine, and Marie Anne Julienne Perrine (Langlais) Bouchet (1790-1859).

After her marriage on 14 November 1859 to Louis-Casimir Colomb (1834-1890), an academic, illustrator and writer, she signed her works "Mme J. Colomb" or "Mme Louis-Casimir Colomb". Her books for young people were published in the "Bibliothèque des écoles et des familles" (Library of schools and families) collection of Hachette editions in Paris. Instead of featuring the usual orphans or unfortunate teenagers common in late 19th century works of juvenile fiction, Colomb constructed characters with minds of their own who often intelligently challenged adult authority. She also published Les Béatitudes, a versified version of the Beatitudes, with music by César Franck.

Joséphine Colomb died in Villerville (Calvados), 1892.

== Awards ==
The Académie Française awarded her the Montyon Prize in 1875, for La fille de Carilès; and the Jules-Favre Prize in 1893, for Ensemble de son œuvre.

== Publications ==
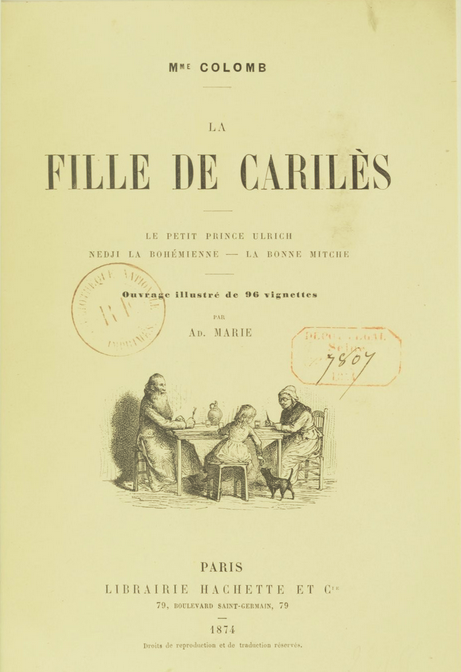
La fille de Carilès (1874)

- La Fille de Carilès, 1874.
- Chloris et Jeanneton, 1877.
- Feu de paille, 1881.
- Pour la muse, illustrated by Tofani, 1884.
- Pour la Patrie ! (aux exilés d'Alscace-Lorraine), illustrated by E. Zier, 1885.
- Danielle, 1888.
- Le Petit Livre des souvenirs, 1888.
- Les Révoltes de Sylvie, illustrated by S. Auzanne, 1889.
- Le Bonheur de Françoise, illustrated by S. Auzanne, 1889.
- Les Étapes de Madeleine, illustrated by S. Auzanne, 1889.
- Mon oncle d'Amérique, illustrated by Tofani, 1890.
- Les Conquêtes d'Hermine, illustrated by H. Vogel, 1892.
- Hélène Corianis, illustrated by A. Moreau, 1893.
- Le Pauvre François / Ferma contre Pagliati, (n.d.).
- Jean l'Innocent, (n.d.).
- Aventures de Trottino, (n.d.).
- Franchise, (n.d.).
- L'Ambition de Jean Trémisort, (n.d.).
- Bataille de fleurs / Les nénuphars / Les lions de mon oncle Paul, (n.d.).
- Chimères, (n.d.).
- Les Cinq Ans de Frédéric, (n.d.).
- Contes aux enfants sages, (n.d.).
- Contes de vacances, (n.d.).
- Contes qui finissent bien, (n.d.).
- En province, (n.d.).
- Entre oiseaux (On prend plus de mouches avec une cuillerée de miel qu'avec une tonne de vinaigre), (n.d.).
- La Famille de Friquet, (n.d.).
- La Fille des bohémiens, (n.d.).
- Franchise : Aimery au clair visage : roman de chevalerie, illustrated by C. Monnot, (n.d.).
- L'Héritière de Vauclain, (n.d.).
- Histoires de bêtes, 1890.
- Histoire morale et instructive de Matou, (n.d.).
- Les Infortunes de Chouchou, 1881.
- Maître Pizzoni / L'Élève de Leoni / Le Chanteur florentin / Tante Gertrude / Une Signature / Chez Grand'Père, (n.d.).
- Mirliflor / Blanche-Écume (Les malheurs de Bébelle), (n.d.).
- Pieter Vandael, 1883.
- Pour les faire mentir, (n.d.).
- Le Prix de Gisèle, (n.d.).
- Récits et historiettes, (n.d.).
- Sabine, (n.d.).
- Souffre-Douleur, (n.d.).
- Sur les toits, (n.d.).
- La Trouvaille de Jeannette / La Victime de Ravageot, (n.d.).

=== Part of Hachette's "Bibliothèque des écoles et des familles" series ===
- La Fille de Carilès / Le Petit Prince Ulrich / Nedji la bohémienne / La Bonne Mitche, illustrated by Adrien Marie, 1874.
- Le Violoneux de la sapinière, illustrated by Adrien Marie, 1874.
- "L' héritière de Vauclain", illustrated by C. Delort, 1879.
- Le Sansonnet de Madame Duysens / Le Maître de Papillon / Le Prix d'honneur, 1882.
- Denis le Tyran, 1883.
- Contes vrais, 1884.
- Simples Récits (Marianne Button / Le Matin et le Soir / Les Consolateurs d'Hassan etc.), 1885.
- Hervé Plémeur, illustrated by E. Zier, 1886.
- Histoires de tous les jours, 1890.
- Les Filles du fermier, 1891.
- Une nichée de pinsons, 1895.
- Deux Mères, illustrated by Adrien Marie, (n.d.).
- Contes pour les enfants, (n.d.).
- Histoires et proverbes, (n.d.).
- L'Ours de neige, (n.d.).
- Petites Nouvelles, (n.d.).

=== Translated works of Italian authors ===
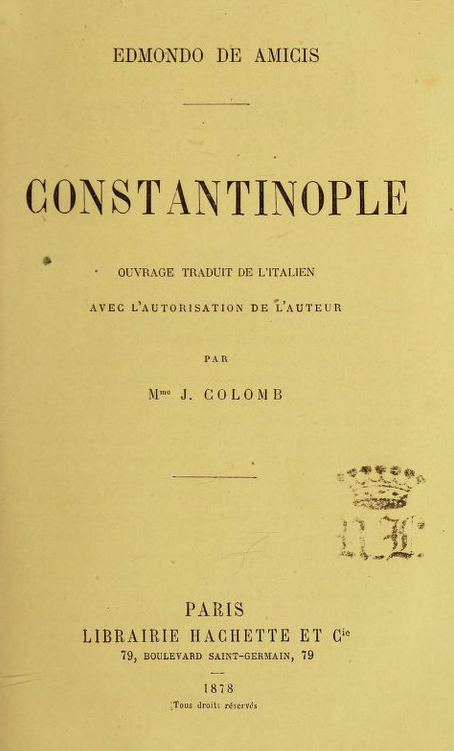
Constantinople (1878)

- De ma fenêtre, novel by Grazia Pierantoni-Mancini
- Constantinople, by Edmondo De Amicis
- L'Espagne, by Edmondo de Amicis
- Souvenirs de Paris et de Londres, by Edmondo De Amicis
