= Lucie Faure-Goyau =

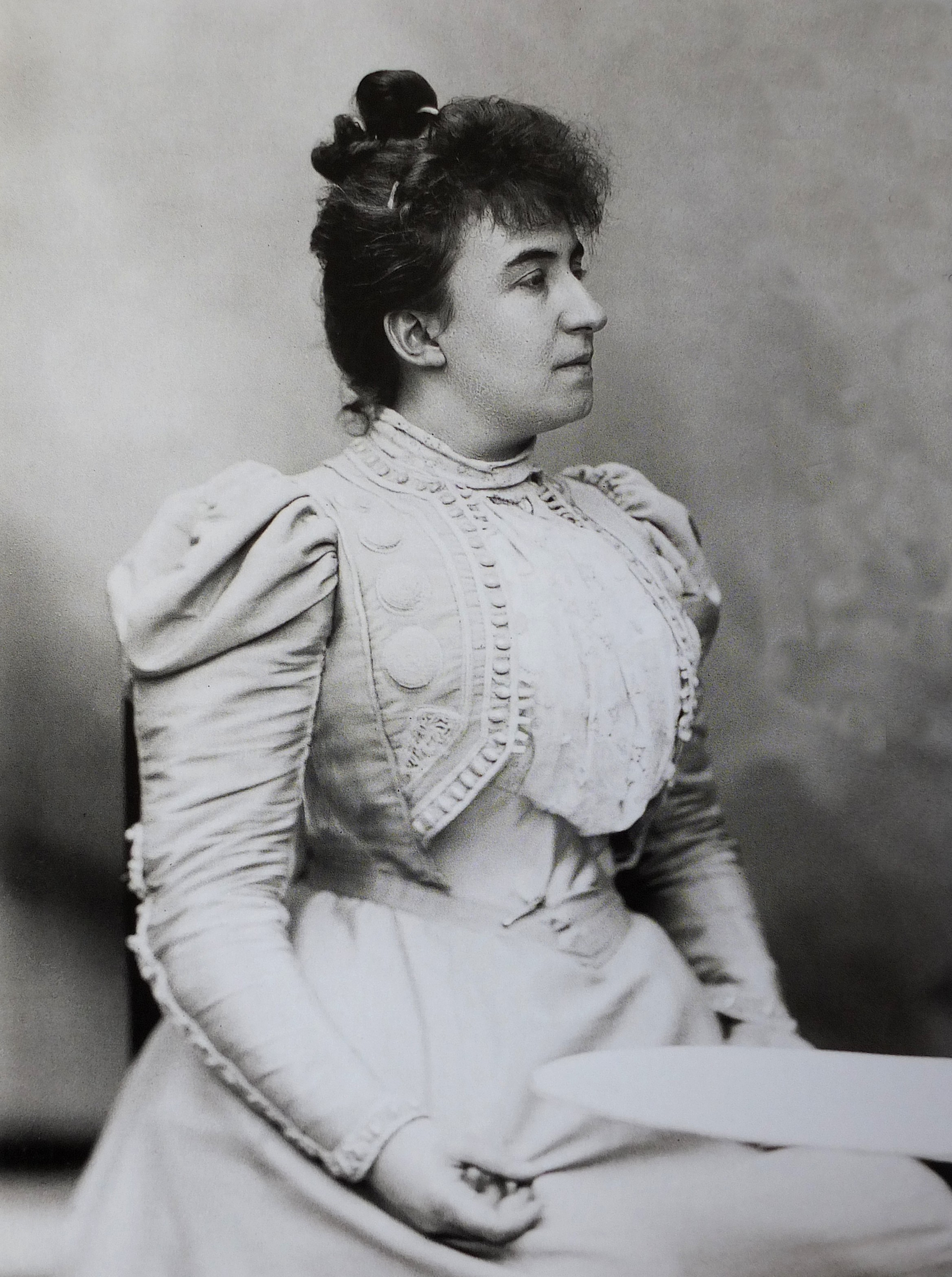
- Born: Lucie-Rose-Séraphine-Élise Faure; May 4, 1866; Amboise
- Died: June 22, 1913 (aged 47); 16th arrondissement of Paris
- Spouse: Georges Goyau
- Parent(s): Félix Faure, Berthe Belluot
- Writing career
- Language: French
- Period: 1888 – 1925
- Genres: Religion, Travel, Memoirs, Biography, Poetry
- Subjects: Catholicism, Southern Europe, North Africa, Holy Land
- Notable works: À propos du centenaire d'Eugénie de Guérin, Méditerranée : l'Égypte, la Terre Sainte, l'Italie

Signature
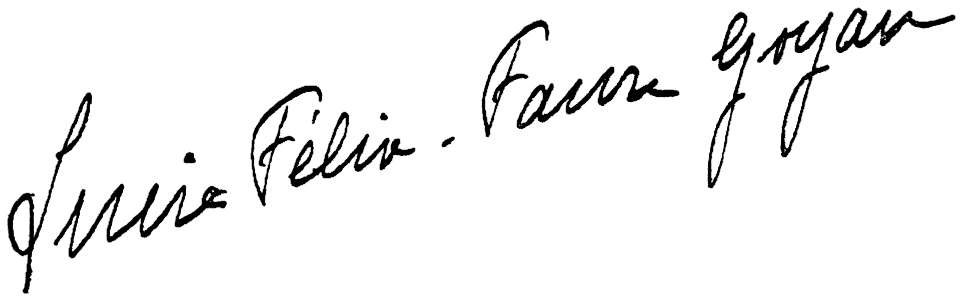

Lucie Faure-Goyau (4 May 1866 - 22 June, 1913) was a French traveller and woman of letters.

== Life ==
Lucie-Rose-Séraphine-Élise Faure was the daughter of the president of the Republic Félix Faure, and Berthe Belluot. When her father discovered that she was interested in reading widely in her youth, he would pique her curiosity by claiming that a certain book he wanted her to read would mean nothing to her. This was generally enough for Lucie to avidly search out the book in his vast library in Le Havre and read it repeatedly. Her father later opened a line of credit especially for her at a Parisian bookshop. The owner of the bookshop was so taken aback at the quantity of books she would request by post that he addressed his shipments to Lucie Faure, bookseller at Le Havre. In the pursuit of reading books in their original language, she learnt Latin, Greek, English and Italian. Later, when her father became president, she caused a stir in a reception held for Cardinal Perraud by admitting to the Bishop of Autun that she had read The City of God and Summa Theologica in Latin.

She and her sister Antoinette (who incidentally triggered the creation of the Proust Questionnaire) were friends with Marcel Proust in their youth; there was even talk of Faure-Goyau marrying Proust, but the scandal associated with the death of Felix Faure prevented the wedding from taking place. She married thirty four year old French historian Georges Goyau on 10 November 1903 at the Saint-Honoré d'Eylau church. She founded the Ligue fraternelle des enfants de France (the Fraternal League of the Children of France) with Apolline de Gourlet.

== Travel ==
Faure-Goyau travelled extensively, often in the company of her father. She visited Algeria, Tunisia, Egypt (with Pierpont Morgan), the Holy Land, Greece and Italy, and invariably wrote detailed memoirs of her journeys and experiences. She admired and was a keen observer of art and culture wherever she went.

== Writing career ==
Faure-Goyau published several books under the name of Lucie Félix-Faure Goyau, notably a biography of French writer Eugénie de Guérin. A devout Catholic, several of her books were on religious subjects. She published poetry, reflections on the Catholic faith, travelogues, and social topics. She was also part of the jury for the Prix Femina when it was instituted in 1904.

== Bibliography ==
- Une excursion en Afrique, Ludovic Baschet, 1888.
- Promenades florentines, Le Havre, 1891.
- Méditerranée, Travel notes, 1896
- Newman, sa vie et ses œuvres, 1901
- Les Femmes dans l’œuvre de Dante, 1902
- Méditerranée : l'Égypte, la Terre Sainte, l'Italie, ed. Félix Juven, 1903.
- Nouvelles promenades florentines, ed. L. Gilbert Genève, 1904.
- L’Arbre des fées, 1905
- La Vie nuancée : France, Italie, Grèce, Recueil de poèmes, ed. Plon-Nourrit et Cie, 1905
- À propos du centenaire d'Eugénie de Guérin, 1906
- Vers la joie. Âmes païennes, âmes chrétiennes : les tristesses de l'âme païenne, Christina Rossetti, Eugénie de Guérin, sainte Catherine de Sienne, 1906.
- Chansons simplettes pour les petits enfants, Illustrations by Paul Helleu, ed. d'Art de la Phosphatine Falières, 1906.
- Carlo Gozzi et la Féerie vénitienne, 1910.
- La Vie et la Mort des fées, essai d'histoire littéraire, 1910.
- Trois amies de Chateaubriand, 1911.
- Spectacles et reflets. L'Âme des enfants, des pays et des saints, 1912.
- Un consolateur et une consolée, esquisses d'âmes païennes, 1913.
- Visions mystiques dans l'Angleterre du Moyen Âge, 1913.
- Choses d'âme : méditations, fragments de journal, prières, 1914.
- Christianisme et culture féminine. Sainte Radegonde. La culture de la femme au Moyen Âge. Les femmes de la Renaissance. Regards de femmes sur l'au-delà : sainte Gertrude, sainte Mechtilde. Le livre des recluses. Juliane de Norwich, 1914.
- Un pressentiment païen du Calvaire, le Prométhée d'Eschyle, 1914.
- L'Évolution féminine. La femme au foyer et dans la cité, 1917.
- L'âme des enfants des pays et des saints : spectacles et reflets, ed. Perrin, 1924.
- Frammenti, 1925.
