= Suzanne Lacascade =

Martiniquais writer (1884–1966)

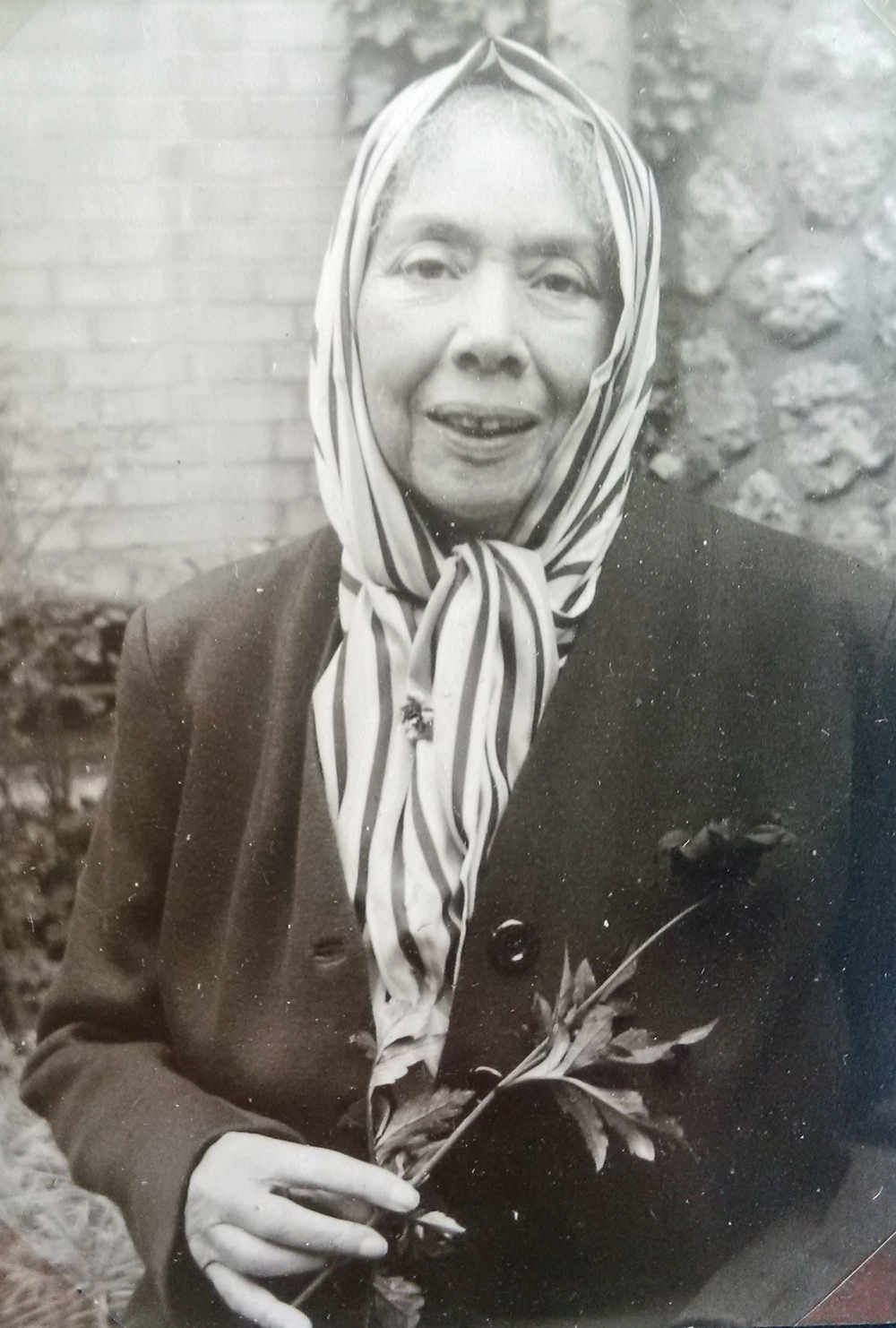
- Lacascade in 1956 in the garden of the Hôtel Mezzara
- Born: 31 March 1884; Fort-de-France, Martinique, French West Indies
- Died: 28 January 1966 (aged 81); 15th arrondissement of Paris, France
- Resting place: Père Lachaise Cemetery, Paris, France
- Education: Sorbonne University
- Writing career
- Notable works: Claire-Solange, âme Africaine (1924)
- Notable awards: Montyon Prize (1925)

Rose Joséphine Suzanne Lacascade (31 March 1884 – 28 January 1966) was a Martiniquais writer, who became one of the first non-white authors to publish in France. She was awarded the Montyon Prize for her only novel, Claire-Solange, âme Africaine (1924).

== Early life and family ==
Lacascade was born on 31 March 1884 in Fort-de-France, Martinique, French West Indies. She had seven siblings.

Lacascade's father, Théodore Lacascade [fr] (1841–1906), was a free man of colour who was the son of an enslaved Guadeloupean (freed in 1838). He trained at the École de Santé de la Marine, was elected Deputy of Guadeloupe then Governor of Tahiti and sat in the Martiniquais National Assembly.

Lacascade studied a degree in Literature at Sorbonne University in Paris, France, graduating in 1904.

== Writing ==
After graduating from the Sorbonne, Lacascade worked as a tutor and wrote for the newspaper Les Veillées des chaumières.

Lacascade's novel, Claire-Solange, âme Africaine, was published in 1924 and was awarded the 1925 Montyon Prize. The work was dedicated by Lacascade "to my African ancestor mothers, to my Creole grandmothers."

The novel explores themes of colonialism, colourism, imperial politics, marginalisation, objectification, the dominance of men over women, "race mixing," and the authors own feelings of racial étrangeté, through the life of protagonist Claire Solange, a light-skinned black woman from Martinique. Her mother is a deceased black woman, and in the novel Solange travels to France with her white colonial officer father to meet his extended family. Solange shocks her relations by deconstructing their racialised view of Christianity and by pointing out that Jesus would not have been white. Solange also praises her African matrilineal ancestors instead of her European patrilineal ancestors, promoting maternal bonds and black womanhood.

When World War I breaks out, the novel praises French Antillean soldiers who fight in Europe as equal to white soldiers and Solange becomes a patriotic nurse. There is a reversal of the "white saviour" narrative in the novel, with Solange saving then becoming engaged to a white man, her second cousin Jacques Danzel.

== Death and legacy ==
Lacascade died on 28 January 1966 in the 15th arrondissement of Paris, France, aged 81. By the time of her death, she lived in anonymity. She is buried in Père Lachaise Cemetery in Paris.

Maryse Condé has been credited with rediscovering Lacascadde and her work. Lacascade's novel was republished in 2019.
