= Les amies de ma femme =

- Directed by: Didier Van Cauwelaert
- Written by: Didier Van Cauwelaert; Philippe Adler
- Produced by: Patrick Godeau
- Starring: Michel Leeb; Christine Boisson
- Cinematography: Martial Thury
- Edited by: Yann Dedet
- Music by: Aldo Frank
- Production company: Canal+
- Distributed by: Pan Européenne Distribution
- Release date: 4 November 1992
- Running time: 90 min.
- Countries: France; Belgium
- Language: French
- Box office: $1,7 million

Les amies de ma femme or My Wife's Girlfriends is a 1992 French-Belgian comedy film directed by Didier Van Cauwelaert.

== Plot ==
A man discovers the qualities of his wife's friends, whom he had always hated.

== Cast ==
- Michel Leeb as Albert Jollin
- Christine Boisson as Victoire Jollin
- Catherine Arditi as Marie-Jeanne
- Nadia Farès as Béatrice de Mennoux
- Dominique Lavanant as Marguerite
- Jacques François as Gilbert Thonon
- Bernard Alane as Toucasse
- Nicolas Vaude as Charlie
- Françoise Dorner as Hélène
- Karine Bellili as Hélène's daughter
- Anne Kessler as Edmée
- Françoise Christophe as Edmée's mother
- Olivier Pajot as Cabanier
- Fabienne Guyon as Adeline
- Branko Zavrsan as Laszlo
- Yolande Moreau as The Concierge
- Franck de la Personne as The Head Hunter
- Jean-Pierre Castaldi as The Plastic Surgeon
- Xavier Gélin as The TV Manager
