= Raging Fists =

- Directed by: Éric Le Hung
- Written by: Tony Gatlif
- Produced by: André Génovès; Roger William; Pierre Belfond; Pierre Sayag; Jean-Claude Leroux
- Starring: Gilles Chevallier; Françoise Dorner; Tony Gatlif; Marie-Georges Pascal
- Cinematography: Jean Monsigny
- Edited by: Jean-Claude Bonfanti
- Music by: Éric Demarsan; Il était une fois
- Release dates: 12 February 1975 (France); 1976 (Italy)
- Running time: 93 minutes
- Country: France
- Language: French

Raging Fists (French: La Rage au poing) is a 1975 French drama film directed by Éric Le Hung.

== Cast ==
- Philippe Lavot: Antoine "Toni"
- Françoise Dorner: "BB la brune"
- Tony Gatlif: Nanar
- Marie-Georges Pascal: Christine
- Gilles Chevallier: Johnny
- Frédéric Norbert: Michou
- Patrick Jeantet: Dédé
- Sylvain Rougerie: Bouboule
- Fred Ulysse: Mr. Sevin
- Pascale Roberts: Mrs. Sevin
- Étienne Bierry: Tony's father
- Pierre Tornade: Jo, the bartender
- Roger Dumas: a Neighbour
- André Thorent: The Commissar
- Su Ssy: The Baka
