= The Twin (1984 film) =

1984 film by Yves Robert

- Film Poster
- Directed by: Yves Robert
- Written by: Donald Westlake (novel); Élisabeth Rappeneau
- Based on: Two Much by Donald E. Westlake
- Produced by: Danièle Delorme; Xavier Gelin; Yves Robert; Fideline Films; Les Productions de La Guéville
- Starring: Pierre Richard; Camilla More; Carey More
- Narrated by: Pierre Richard
- Cinematography: Robert Fraisse
- Edited by: Pierre Gillette
- Music by: Vladimir Cosma
- Distributed by: AAA; Roissy Films
- Release dates: October 10, 1984 (France); December 19, 1985 (West Germany)
- Running time: 104 minutes
- Country: France
- Language: French

The Twin (French: Le jumeau) is a 1984 French comedy film directed by Yves Robert, starring Pierre Richard, Camilla More and Carey More. Based on Donald Westlake's novel Two Much, the story involves an indebted Frenchman who meets a pair of beautiful and rich American twin sisters. Inventing a twin brother, he manages to marry both and live their opulent lifestyle.

Its American/Spanish remake Two Much, starring Antonio Banderas and Melanie Griffith, was released in 1995.

== Plot ==
Owner of a struggling business in Paris, Matthias Duval stakes all he has in a game of poker and loses. At a party he meets a beautiful young American, Liz, and they soon end up in bed. Next morning she says that she has a twin called Betty, to which he jokes that he has a twin called Mathieu. When he meets Betty, she says she must meet his brother. Creating a different persona as "Mathieu", he starts romancing Betty as well. What he does not know is that each sister must get married by the end of the year or she will lose her share of the fortune left by their parents. The lawyer in charge of the estate, Volpinex, warns Matthias to stay away from them.

Betty marries "Mathieu" secretly, and next morning as Matthias he decides he must break with Liz. She convinces him to get engaged to her by the promise of 4,000 dollars a month plus sexual freedom. Using the latter clause, in persona as Matthias he spends a night with Liz. She flies him to the US to marry him there. Matthias then leaves Liz to go on an imaginary business trip to Japan, while "Mathieu" joins his wife Betty and her lonely sister in an isolated seaside house they own,

When the twins are out one night, the lawyer Volpinex appears. He has solid evidence that there is only one Matthias, who has married bigamously to defraud the parents' estate. In a struggle, Volpinex is accidentally shot and a fire accidentally started. "Mathieu" disappears, learning from the radio that the police believe the charred corpse to be his and that Volpinex, who has disappeared, must be the murderer. Hastily returning from Japan, Matthias resumes relations with his wife Liz and comforts the bereaved Betty. In fact, the girls knew of his duplicity all along and are happy to live as a ménage à trois.

== Cast ==
- Pierre Richard as Matthias Duval/"Matthieu Duval"
- Jean-Pierre Kalfon as Ernest Volpinex
- Camilla More as Betty Kerner
- Carey More as Liz Kerner
- Jacques Frantz as Ralph
- Françoise Dorner as Marie
- Andréa Ferréol as Evie
- Jean-Pierre Castaldi as Charlie
- Paul Le Person as the beggar
- Isabelle Strawa as Nikki
- Yves Robert as a man in the elevator (cameo appearance)
