= The Passage (1986 film) =

- Directed by: René Manzor
- Written by: René Manzor
- Produced by: Daniel Champagnon; Alain Delon; Francis Lalanne
- Starring: Alain Delon; Christine Boisson
- Cinematography: André Diot
- Edited by: Christian Ange; Roland Baubeau
- Music by: Jean-Félix Lalanne
- Production company: Adel Productions
- Distributed by: UGC Distribution
- Release date: 3 December 1986
- Running time: 80 minutes
- Country: France
- Language: French

The Passage (French: Le Passage) is a 1986 French supernatural thriller film written and directed by René Manzor, and starring Alain Delon.

It was a success with admissions of 1,998,983 in France.

== Plot ==
Jean Diaz, a once-renowned animated film creator, lives in isolation with his son David after separating from his wife. Known for his vocal opposition to violence, Jean has long abandoned his career, drawing the attention of Death herself, who watches him from a digital realm beyond the living.

After a fatal car crash orchestrated by Death, Jean dies while David falls into a coma. Death offers Jean a deal: finish a violent animated film he abandoned years ago, and David will be revived. Jean agrees, sacrificing a hand in the process. As he works, he discovers Death’s true plan—to use his film to destroy humanity.

Jean rebels, escapes Death’s domain, and fights to save his son, who senses his father's imprisonment. When Death breaks the pact and kidnaps David, Jean confronts her, severs her hand with her own scythe, destroys her system, and rescues David. The two reunite on a beach in the world of the living, while Death watches, powerless.

The film closes with Jean’s voice: “If you think of me as strongly as I think of you, then I’m sure, David, we’ll meet again.”

== Cast ==
- Alain Delon as Jean Diaz
- Christine Boisson as Catherine Diaz
- Jean-Luc Moreau as Patrick
- Alain Musy as David Diaz
- Alberto Lomeo as Le chirurgien (“The surgeon”)
- Jean-Pierre Levasseur as L'anesthésiste (“The anesthetist”)
- Daniel Emilfork as La Mort (“Death”; uncredited)

== Release ==
When the film was screened on French television on TF1 in 1988 it received the highest primetime rating for the year with a 37% rating and 59% share of the audience.
