= Camilla and Carey More =

English Actresses

- Born: 15 October 1957 (age 68); London, England, UK
- Occupation: Actresses
- Years active: 1983–2014

Camilla More and Carey More (born 15 October 1957) are English actresses who have starred in films and on television. They are identical twin sisters born in London. They are known for their roles in the 1984 horror film Friday the 13th: The Final Chapter as Tina and Terri.

Camilla's most recent film is the 1997 film Dead Tides. Her well-known TV role was in the soap operas Days of Our Lives as Gillian Forrester from 1986 to 1987; she originated the role that her sister had gone on to portray from 1987 to 1988. She has made guest appearances on TV shows such as The A-Team, Cheers, Matlock, Baywatch, and Baywatch Nights. Camilla temporarily stepped into the role of Anna Devane from 1991 to 1992, a popular character of the soap opera General Hospital which had been played by Finola Hughes.

== Filmography ==
- Friday the 13th: The Final Chapter (1984) - (Camilla - Tina / Carey - Terri)
- The Twin (1984) - (Camilla - Betty Kerner / Carey - Liz Kerner)
- Once Bitten (1985) - (Carey - Moll Flanders Vampire)
- The Serpent of Death (1989) - (Camilla - Rene)
- The Dark Side of the Moon (1990) - (Camilla - Leslie)
- Dead Tides (1997) - (Camilla - Lori)
- Crystal Lake Memories: The Complete History of Friday the 13th (2013) (Documentary film) - Both themselves

=== Television ===
- The A-Team (1983) - (Camilla - Girlfriend)
- Fantasy Island (1984) - (Carey - 2nd Nurse)
- Calendar Girl Murders (1984) - (Camilla)
- Cheers (1985) - (Camilla - Carolyn Huxley)
- Days of Our Lives (1987–88) - (Camilla - Gillian Forrester / Carey - Grace Forrester)
- Maybe Baby (1988) - (Camilla - Emily)
- Red Wind (1991) - (Camilla - Bonnie)
- General Hospital (1991–92) - (Camilla – Anna Devane )
- Matlock (1989) - (Camilla - Psychic Jennifer Holtz)
- Baywatch (1995) - (Camilla - Jill Reynolds)
- Baywatch Nights (1997) - (Camilla)
- His Name Was Jason: 30 Years of Friday the 13th (2009) (Documentary film) - Both themselves
- Mansion Hunters (2014) - (Camilla / Carey)
