= Nelly Roussel =

French activist (1878–1922)

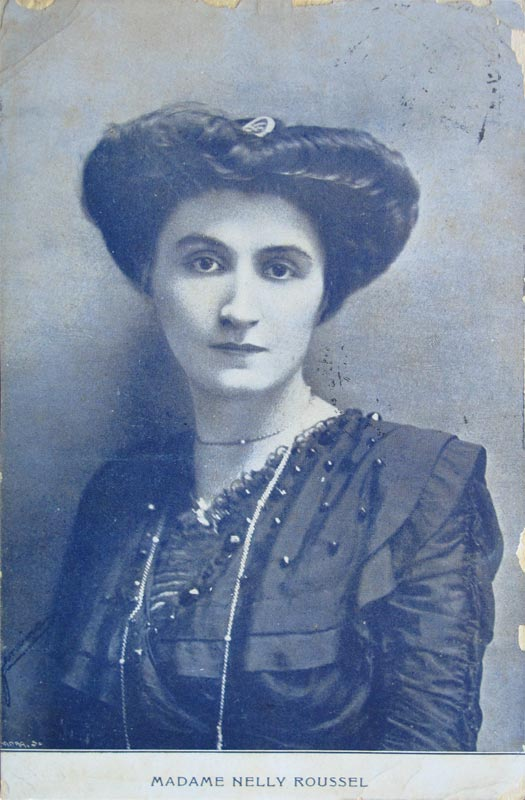
- Nelly Roussel in 1911
- Born: 5 January 1878; France
- Died: 18 December 1922 (aged 44); France

Nelly Roussel (5 January 1878 – 18 December 1922) was a French free thinker, anarchist, and feminist. As a Neo-Malthusian feminist, she advocated for birth-control in European as well as a number of other pro-women and motherhood positions within Europe's capitalist systems. She was known for her beauty and charm during public speaking, along with her soft yet commanding voice that appealed to many people.

== Early life and family ==
Roussel was born in France to Louise Nel Roussel and Léon Roussel. Roussel was raised Catholic. Shortly after her father's death in 1894, her mother remarried Antonin Montupet. Roussel also had a sister born in 1880, Andrée Roussel. She was educated at an elementary school, and then continued her education further at home.

== Advocacy and personal relationships ==
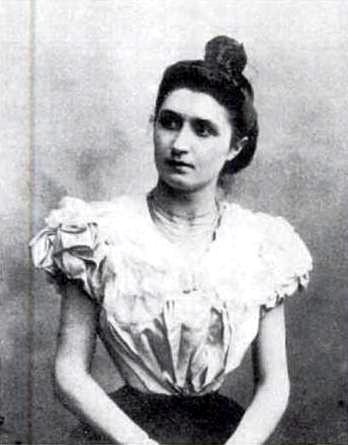
Nelly Roussel in 1896.

Roussel became the first feminist spokeswoman for birth control in Europe. She was a Neo-Malthusian. Members of the Neo-Malthusian movement, led by Paul Robin, believed that birth control held the answer to preventing natural disaster, poverty, and suffering by artificially regulating the population. She delivered her messages on birth control, motherhood, women's place in the capitalist system, and women's rights within the home through public lectures, journalism, and theatre. Following the performance of Louise Michel’s La Grève, Roussel and Véra Starkoff were involved in the movement to create a theater for the people that would advocate the socialist ideal.

In a speech given on 9 April 1904, Roussel claimed she was fighting for "freedom in, for, or of motherhood". She had support, but political resistance to her message revealed conservative perceptions about gender among the French. She was a political activist. Roussel got letters from her audience that discussed the impact she had on them.

Roussel was married to Henri Godet, a French artist and sculptor, who was very involved in scheduling her work, though he did not travel with her. Unlike many other women during this time, Roussel married for love, and not due to an arrangement. Though many of her speeches reference her lack of desire for children and active measures against having children, Roussel herself gave birth to three children. Nelly Roussel experienced difficulty during her three pregnancies. Mireille, a daughter born in 1899, André, son named for sister in 1901, and Marcel, a son born in 1904. Roussel's first son, André, died shortly after his birth in 1902, leading to a deep depression for Roussel. When Roussel realized she was pregnant with her third child, she sought out a doctor to help ease the pain of labor. While anesthetics for child birth were ill-advised and not taught at the time, Roussel found Dr. Lucas, who was willing to work with her. Roussel was not aware prior to or at the time of her birth, that Lucas' methods led to the death of many women and children. Roussel and child, however, survived, and this led to a reanimation of Roussel's belief that science and society can create a pain free birth, liberate women from undesired pregnancies, and ease motherhood for women. Roussel was limitedly involved in the raising of her children, who lived with her parents and sister for much of their childhood. Roussel was also in favor of coeducation and did not like how other parents tried to make their children behave, making them into old traditional roles.

Along with being an activist, Roussel was involved with politics as well. She testified at different trials including anti-militarist trials, like Hervé in 1905, anti-war trials, like Hélène Brion's in 1918, and created a lawsuit, which she ended up losing, against L'Autorité in 1906-07. In 1920 she started a school to help teach women to be speakers also. Roussel wrote about how she believed that sex should not just be painful and seen as only for childbirth, but also for pleasure for the woman. No matter marital, social, or maternal standing, she believed that women had the right to enjoy self-fulfillment in their life. Due to her involvement with supporting birth control, he growing population of the French right-wing pronatalist movement blamed her and others for the declining birth rates in France. They saw her as a traitor and corrupt because of her beliefs in contraception. She was also against how society allowed women to suffer in private and made women stay silent about the pain during childbirth.

== Later life and death ==
In the years following World War I, her health worsened and she was diagnosed with many illnesses such a severe menstrual cramps, depression, and anxiety. Roussel died from tuberculosis. She wanted to give women control over their own bodies and sexuality. Her radical position on women’s rights wasn't recognized for another seventy-five years. Roussel was a first-wave feminist. She spoke out about private and public issues. Her papers are kept at Bibliothèque Marguerite Durand.

== Publications ==
Roussel contributed an essay to Le Néo-malthusisme est-il moral?

She also wrote a number of books, some of which were published posthumously:

- Pourquoi elles vont à l'église: comédie en un acte, Paroles de combat et de paix, Quelques discours (1903),
- Quelques lances rompues pour nos libertés (1910),
- Paroles de combat et d'espoir (1919)
- Ma forêt (1920)
- Trois conférences (1930, published posthumously)
- Derniers combats (1932, posthumously published)
- L'eternelle sacrifiée (1979, posthumously published)
