= Prix Émile Augier =

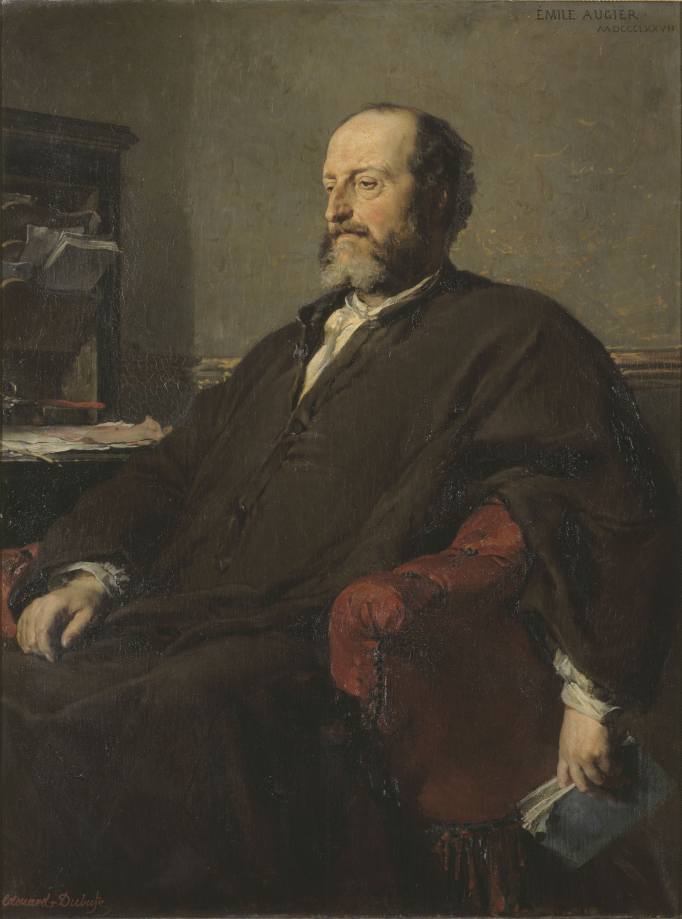
The prize is named for the French dramatist Émile Augier.

The Prix Émile Augier is a literary prize bestowed by the Académie française, with a silver medal from the Academy.

It is an annual award that was first given sporadically from the late 19th century until 1961. It was reestablished in 1994 as a collaboration with the foundations Émile Augier, Eugène Brieux, Paul Hervieu and de Soussay. The prize is intended to reward a work relating to drama.

== Laureates ==
- 1895: François Coppée, Pour la Couronne
- 1899: Jean Richepin, Le Chemineau
- 1902: Auguste Dorchain, Pour l’Amour
- 1905:
  - Henry Bataille, Résurrection
  - Émile Fabre, La Rabouilleuse
  - Georges Mitchell, L’Absent
- 1908:
  - Alfred Bouchinet, Son père
  - Émile Fabre, Les ventres dorés
  - Albert Guinon, Son père
  - Catulle Mendès, Glatigny
- 1911: Gabriel Trarieux, L’Alibi
- 1914: Marie Lenéru, Les Affranchies
- 1917: Gaston Devore, L’Envolée
- 1920: Miguel Zamacoïs, M. Césarin écrivain public
- 1923: Paul Raynal, Le maître de son cœur
- 1926: Lucien Besnard, L’homme qui n’est plus de ce monde
- 1929: André Boussac de Saint-Marc, Moloch
- 1932: Auguste Villeroy, La Double passion
- 1938: François Mauriac, collected works
- 1941: Claude Socorri, Fabienne
- 1951: Jean Sylvain, Le père Damien
- 1961: Marius Riollet, La Fin du monde
- 1996: Charles Charras, Mon mot à dire and all his work (Nizet)
- 2001: Pierre Barillet, Quatre années sans relâche (Bernard de Fallois)
- 2004: Jean-Paul Alègre, Agnès Belladone (Avant-Scène Théâtre)
- 2005: Christophe Pellet, S'opposer à l'orage (Arche-Éditeur)
- 2007: Françoise Dorner, La Douceur assassine (Albin Michel)
- 2009: Patrick Cauvin, Héloïse (Albin Michel)
- 2010: Pierre Notte, Et l'enfant sur le loup and Les couteaux dans le dos (Avant-Scène Théâtre)
- 2012: Michel Bernardy, Le Jeu Verbal, Oralité de la langue française (L'Âge d'Homme)
- 2015: Pascal Rambert, Répétition (Les Solitaires intempestifs)
- 2016: Laurent Mauvignier, Retour à Berratham (éditions de Minuit)
- 2018: Nathalie Boisvert, Antigone au Printemps (Léméac éditions)
- 2020: Christine Montalbetti, La Conférence des objets
