= Mr. Morgan's Last Love =

- Theatrical release poster
- Directed by: Sandra Nettelbeck
- Written by: Sandra Nettelbeck
- Based on: La Douceur Assassine by Françoise Dorner
- Produced by: Astrid Kahmke; Frank Kaminski; Philipp Kreuzer; Ulrich Stiehm
- Starring: Michael Caine; Clémence Poésy; Justin Kirk; Jane Alexander; Michèle Goddet; Anne Alvaro; Gillian Anderson
- Cinematography: Michael Bertl
- Edited by: Christoph Strothjohann
- Music by: Hans Zimmer
- Production companies: Senator Film; Sidney Kimmel Entertainment
- Distributed by: Senator Film (Germany); A-Film Benelux (Belgium); Image Entertainment (US)
- Release dates: 29 June 2013 (Munich); 1 November 2013 (US)
- Running time: 116 minutes
- Countries: Germany; Belgium; United States; France
- Languages: English; French
- Box office: $1,927,963

Mr. Morgan's Last Love (also known as Last Love) is a 2013 film based on Françoise Dorner's French novel La Douceur Assassine. It is written and directed by Sandra Nettelbeck and stars Michael Caine and Clémence Poésy.

== Synopsis ==
The film centres around a retired, widowed professor (Caine) living in Paris who develops a special relationship with a young French woman (Poésy). That's the central structure for a sensitive story about changing relationships for this professor and his son, and life's meaning.

== Cast ==
- Michael Caine as Matthew Morgan
- Clémence Poésy as Pauline Laubie
- Justin Kirk as Miles Morgan
- Jane Alexander as Joan Morgan
- Gillian Anderson as Karen Morgan
- Richard Hope as Philatelist
- Anne Alvaro as Colette Léry
- Louis-Julien Petit as Sleeping Student on Bus

== Production ==
The film was shot in Paris, Brittany, Brussels and Cologne in August 2011.

The book's French protagonist Monsieur Armand was changed to American Mr. Morgan. Nettelbeck wrote the screenplay with Caine in mind.

== Reception ==
Mr. Morgan's Last Love received mixed reviews. On Rotten Tomatoes, the film holds a 31% rating, based on 39 reviews, with an average score of 4.67/10. The website's critics consensus reads: "Last Love benefits from a typically strong Michael Caine performance, but it's ultimately too mawkish and dawdling to make much impact." Metacritic gives the film a score of 36 out of 100, sampled from thirteen reviews.

Peter Bradshaw, writing in The Guardian, called the film a "coy and unendurable tale of a tastefully sexless May-to-December romance". "This dull, dawdling film, adapted from Françoise Dorner’s novel “La Douceur Assassine,” eventually succumbs to sentimentality," wrote Stephen Holden in the NYT.
