= Georges Goyau =

French historian and essayist

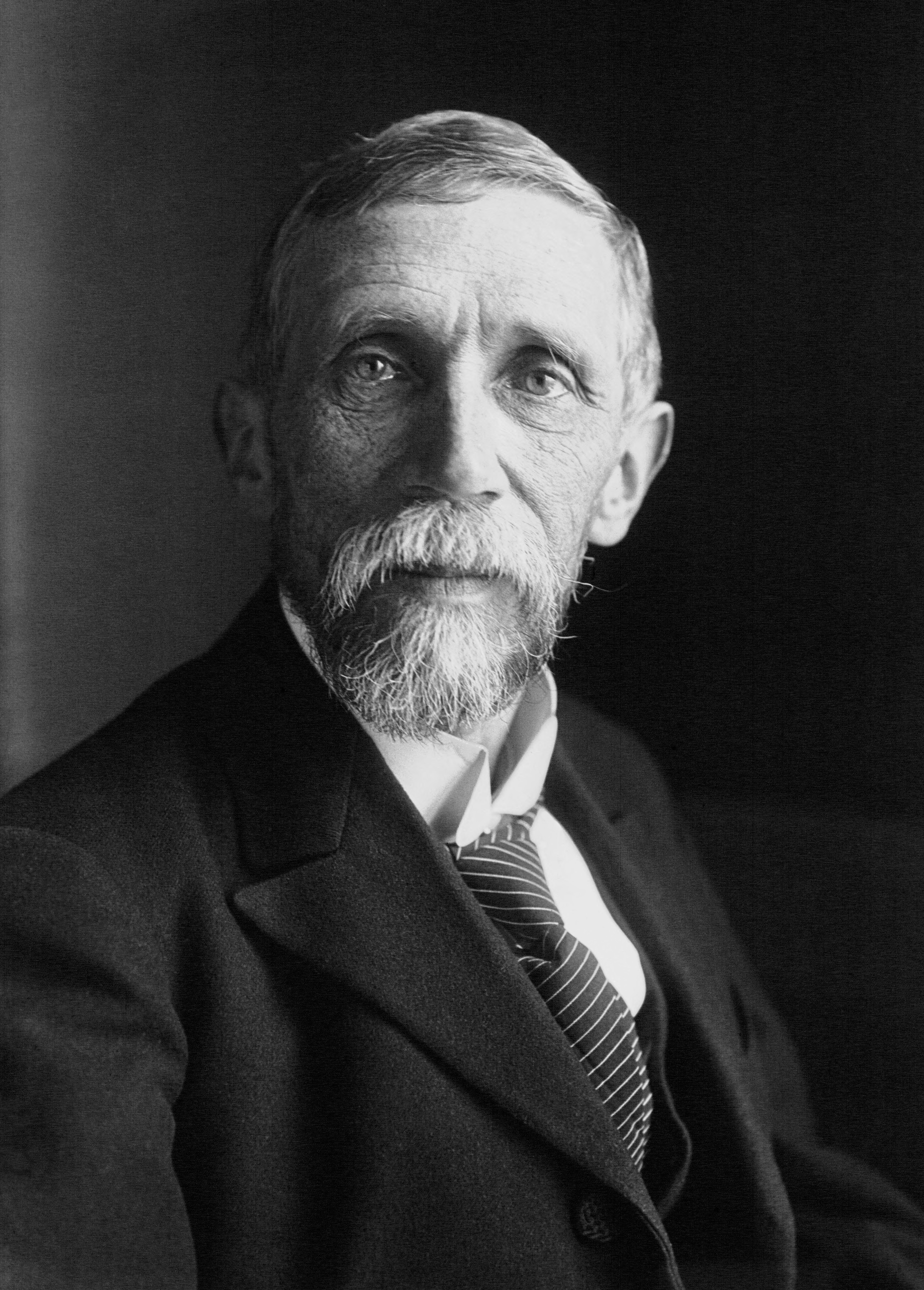

Georges Goyau (31 May 1869 – 25 October 1939) was a French historian and essayist specializing in religious history.

== Biography ==
Pierre-Louis-Théophile-Georges Goyau was born in Orléans 31 May 1869, and attended the Lycée d'Orléans before moving on to Lycée Louis-le-Grand and then École Normale Supérieure both in Paris, where he was influenced by philosopher Léon Ollé-Laprune. With his studies in Roman history he became known as a classical scholar. In 1892, Goyau joined the École Français de Rome, an institute for history, archaeology, and social sciences.

In 1893, he wrote Le Pape, les catholiques et la question sociale, a democratic interpretation of Pope Leo XIII's 1891 encyclical Rerum novarum.

Goyau was a prolific writer, publishing 86 monographs. As associate editor, he penned some 110 articles for the Revue des deux mondes, a monthly literary and cultural affairs magazine, publishing a lot of articles on Catholic history, for example: L’Église libre dans l’Europe libre (The free Church in the free Europe), Les Origines religieuses du Canada (The religious origins of Canada), L’Effort catholique dans la France d’aujourd’hui (The Catholic efforts in today's France), and Le Catholicisme, doctrine d’action (Catholicism, doctrine of action). Bernard Reardon calls his five volume L'Allemagne religieuse, a detailed study of religion in German-speaking lands, Goyau's "literary achievement". Goyau also composed a number of entries for the Catholic Encyclopedia.

In 1922, he was elected a member of the Académie française, where he became secretary in 1938. Apart from his writing, he served as a director of the Hospital of the Sisters of Saint Vincent de Paul. He was also a Commander of the Legion of Honour. The Académie established the Georges Goyau History and sociology Prize in his honour.

In 1903, Goyau married the writer Lucie Faure, daughter of the French president Félix Faure. His second marriage was to the Catholic writer Juliette Heuzey, who published a book titled Dieu premier servi. Georges Goyau : sa vie et son œuvre in his memory in 1947.

== Works ==
- Chronologie de l'Empire Romain, 1891.
- Le Pape, les catholiques et la question sociale, 1893.
- Le Vatican: les papes et la civilisation, 1895.
- L'Allemagne religieuse: le Protestantisme, 1898.
- La Franc-Maçonnerie en France, 1899.
- L'École d'aujourd'hui. 2 volumes, 1899-1906.
- L'Allemagne religieuse: le Catholicisme. 4 volumes, 1905-1909.
- Bismark et l'Église; le Kulturkampf, 1913.
- Sainte Jeanne d'Arc. 1920.
- Un grand missionnaire, le cardinal Lavigerie. 1925
- Le Cardinal Mercier, 1926.

== Honors ==
- Rue Georges Goyau in Bernay is named after him.
- Member of the Order of Leopold
- Commander in the Order of St. Gregory
- Chevalier of the Legion of Honor
- Member of the Académie Française

== Sources ==
- Jérôme Grondeux, Georges Goyau (1869–1939): Un intellectuel catholique sous la IIIe République (Rome: École française de Rome. 2007) (Collection de l'École Francaise de Rome, 38).
- Müller, Karl. 1998. "Georges Goyau." Biographical Dictionary of Christian Missions, edited by Gerald H. Anderson, p. 253, 254. W. B. Eerdmans Publishing Company, Grand Rapids, Michigan.Web access.
