= Claire Julie de Nanteuil =

French writer

- Born: Claire Julie Pascalis; 27 October 1834; Paris, France
- Died: 17 June 1897 (aged 62); Paris, France
- Occupation: Writer
- Spouse: Georges Émile de Nanteuil de la Norville
- Writing career
- Pen name: Mrs. P. de Nanteuil; Mrs. de Nanteuil
- Language: French
- Genre: Children's novels
- Notable works: Capitaine; L'épave mysterious
- Notable awards: Montyon Prize

Claire Julie de Nanteuil (née, Pascalis; pen names, Mrs. P. de Nanteuil and Mrs. de Nanteuil; 27 October 1834 – 17 June 1897) was a 19th-century French writer. She was a two time recipient of the Montyon Prize. Nanteuil died in 1897

== Biography ==
Claire Julie Pascalis was born in Paris on 27 October 1834 (or 1829). (Note: According to Massa-Gille (1979), Claire-Julie Pascalis de Nanteuil was born in 1829 and died in 1902.) She was the daughter of Caroline Éléonore de La Porte des Coupres and Jacques-Joseph Pascalis, politician, deputy of the Var from 1837 to 1848. She married Georges Émile de Nanteuil de la Norville, adviser to the Court of Auditors.

Using the names "Mrs. P. de Nanteuil" or "Mrs. de Nanteuil", she was the author of novels for young people. They were illustrated with engravings by Alfred Paris and Felician von Myrbach-Rheinfeld, and published by Hachette. Her works include: Capitaine, 1888; L'Épave mystérieuse, 1891; Trois demandes en mariage, 1891; En esclavage, 1891; Une poursuite, 1892; Le Secret de la grève, 1893; Alexandre Vorzof, 1894; L'héritier des Vaubert, 1895; and Monnaie de singe, 1898. Nanteuil won the Montyon Prize twice from the Académie Française: in 1888 for Capitaine and in 1890 for L'épave mysterious.

Claire Julie de Nanteuil died in the 7th arrondissement of Paris, on 17 June 1897 (or 1902).

== Selected works ==
- Capitaine, 1888 (Text via Gallica)
- L'Épave mystérieuse, 1891 (Text via Gallica)
- Trois demandes en mariage, 1891
- En esclavage, 1891
- Une poursuite, 1892 (Text via Gallica)
- Le Secret de la grève, 1893
- Alexandre Vorzof, 1894
- L'héritier des Vaubert, 1895 (Text via Gallica)
- Monnaie de singe, 1898 (Text via Gallica)
