= Lucien Besnard =

French playwright (1872–1955)

Lucien Besnard (19 January 1872 – 1955) was a French playwright and drama critic.

Besnard was born in Nonancourt on 19 January 1872. He held a doctorate in law. He also studied Russian at the École des langues orientales.

His play Le Coeur partagé was premiered on 6 December 1926 in Paris by the Comédie-Française at the Salle Richelieu, and ran until 1931. His 1927 play Dans l'ombre du harem was adapted the following year into a silent film of the same name (In the Shadow of the Harem).

In 1932, Besnard adapted Im weißen Rößl, a German operetta by Ralph Benatzky, into French as L'Auberge du Cheval Blanc.

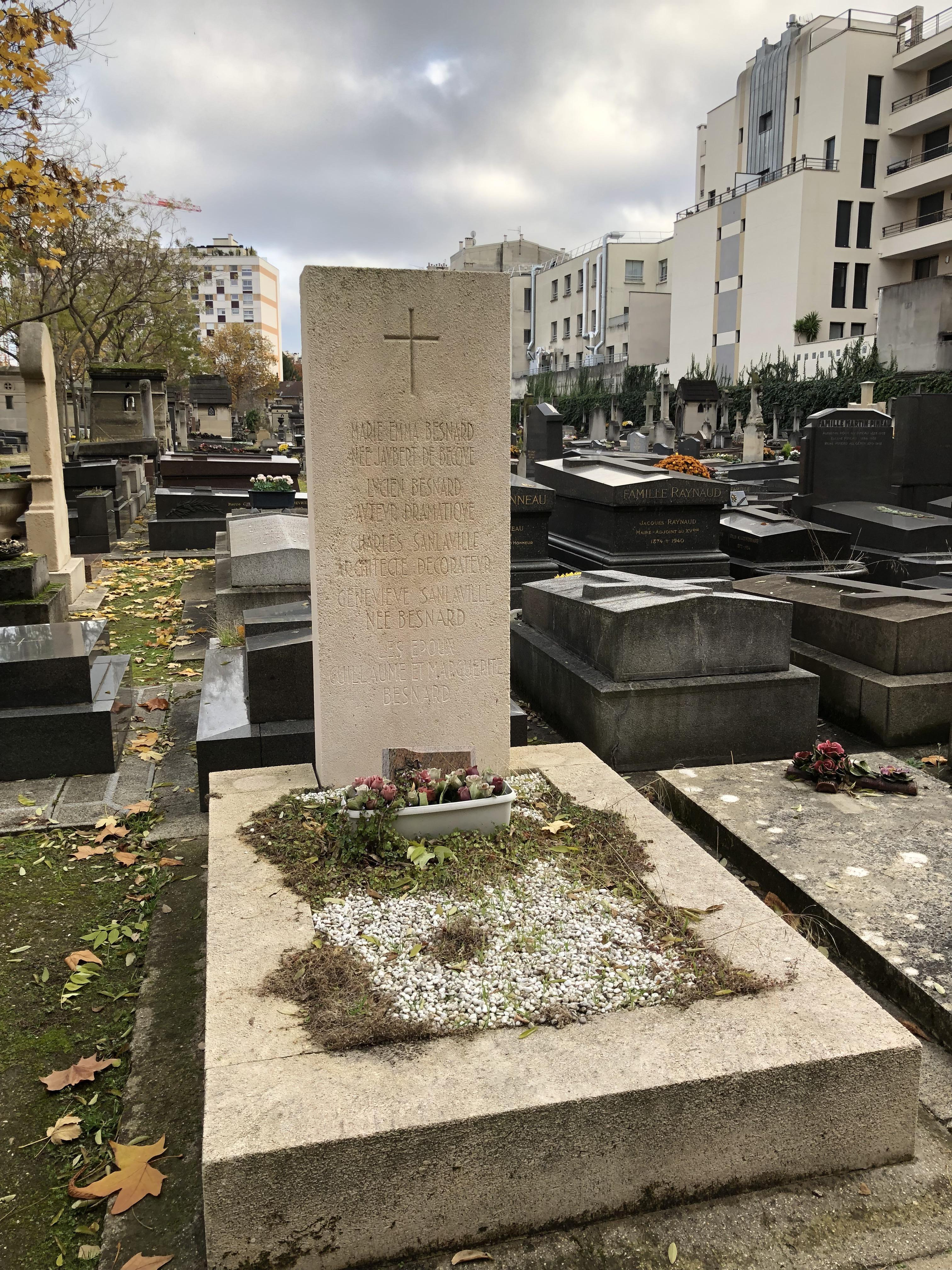
Grave of Lucien Besnard in Paris

Besnard died in Paris in 1955. He is buried at Vaugirard Cemetery in Paris.

== Plays ==
- 1896: Le Glas
- 1898: Papa Dollivet
- 1899: Les Chiens du maître
- 1900: La Fronde
- 1902: Le Domaine
- 1904: L'Affaire Grisel
- 1906: La Plus Amoureuse
- 1908: Mon ami Teddy
- 1909: Le Diable ermite
- 1910: La Folle enchère
- 1913: Je veux revoir ma Normandie
- 1924: L'homme qui n'est plus de ce monde
- 1926: Le Cœur partagé
- 1927: Dans l'ombre du harem

== Prizes ==
The Académie Française awarded Lucien Besnard two prizes:

- 1926: Prix Émile Augier for L'homme qui n’est plus de ce monde
- 1928: Prix Toirac for Le cœur partagé
