= Christine Boisson =

French actress (1956–2024)

- Born: 8 April 1956; Salon-de-Provence, Bouches-du-Rhône, France
- Died: 21 October 2024 (aged 68); Paris, France
- Occupation: Actress
- Children: 1

Christine Boisson (8 April 1956 – 21 October 2024) was a French actress.

== Biography ==
Boisson was born in Salon-de-Provence on 8 April 1956; her mother was French and her father was from the West Indies. After she registered in a model agency, Just Jaeckin liked her photo, and she got a part in the film Emmanuelle starring Sylvia Kristel, in which she played a lollipop-sucking teenager who masturbates over a picture of Paul Newman. Then she got some more film roles, but she also continued to study acting.

In 1977, she made her stage debut in Chekhov's The Seagull directed by Bruno Bayen.

In 1984, she received the Prix Romy Schneider (most promising actress awards) for Rue Barbare.

In 2005, she was starring in the stage play Viol by Botho Strauß (based on Titus Andronicus), directed by Luc Bondy.

In 2010, it was widely reported that she had attempted suicide after she climbed over the parapet of her 5th floor apartment and was stopped by firefighters. In a later interview, she said she had done this after an argument with her boyfriend at the time as an act of psychological manipulation, an action she was not proud of. She also described growing up with an abusive mother who constantly reminded her that she had almost died giving birth to her, and sexually abused both her and her brother.

Boisson died from lung disease at a care home in Paris on 21 October 2024, at the age of 68. She had a daughter.

== Filmography ==
- 1973: The Mad Adventures of Rabbi Jacob - Une invitée au mariage (uncredited)
- 1974: Love at the Top (directed by Michel Deville) - Jeune fille nue chez Flora (uncredited)
- 1974: La Bonne Nouvelle (Short, directed by André Weinfeld) - Florence / The Sister
- 1974: Emmanuelle (1974, directed by Just Jaeckin) - Marie-Ange
- 1975: Playing with Fire (directed by Alain Robbe-Grillet) - Christina, la fille dans la malle / Desdémone
- 1975: Thomas - Sophie
- 1975: Divine
- 1975: Flic Story (directed by Jacques Deray) - Jocelyne
- 1976: Naked Massacre (directed by Denis Héroux) - Christine
- 1977: Adom ou Le sang d'Abel - La femme de Caïn
- 1980: Extérieur, nuit (directed by Jacques Bral) - Cora
- 1981: Seuls (directed by Francis Reusser) - Carole
- 1981: La chanson du mal aimé
- 1982: Identificazione di una donna (directed by Michelangelo Antonioni) - Ida
- 1982: Wings of Night (directed by Hans Noever) - Rosa
- 1984: Rue barbare (directed by Gilles Béhat) - Emma-la-Rouge, dit 'Manu', membre de la bande à Manu
- 1984: Liberté la nuit (directed by Philippe Garrel) - Gémina
- 1984: Paris vu par... 20 ans après (directed by Philippe Garrel) - Genie (segment 3)
- 1986: L'aube (directed by Miklós Jancsó) - Iliana
- 1986: Rue du Départ (directed by Tony Gatlif) - Mimi
- 1986: Le passage (directed by René Manzor) - Catherine Diaz
- 1987: Jenatsch (directed by Daniel Schmid) - Nina
- 1987: Le moine et la sorcière (directed by Suzanne Shiffman) - Elda
- 1987: Unsettled Land (directed by Uri Barbash) - Sima
- 1988: La maison de jeanne (directed by Magali Clément) - Jeanne
- 1989: Radio corbeau (directed by Yves Boisset) - Agnès Deluca - journaliste à France Hebdo
- 1989: Un amour de trop - Sandra
- 1990: Il y a des jours... et des lunes (directed by Claude Lelouch) - La femme au petit caillou / The innkeeper's wife
- 1991: Caldo soffocante (directed by Giovanna Gagliardo) - Marie Christine
- 1992: My Wife's Girlfriends (directed by Didier Van Cauwelaert) - Victoire Jollin
- 1992: Oh pardon ! Tu dormais... (TV Movie, directed by Jane Birkin) - Elle
- 1993: Une nouvelle vie (directed by Olivier Assayas) - Laurence
- 1993: Les marmottes (directed by Élie Chouraqui) - Marie-Claire
- 1994: Pas très catholique (directed by Tonie Marshall) - Florence
- 1997: L'Homme idéal (directed by Xavier Gélin) - Nicole
- 2000: En face (directed by Mathias Ledoux) - Clémence / Housekeeper
- 2000: Only you (directed by Laetitia Masson) - The home's head mistress
- 2000: La mécanique des femmes (directed by Jérôme de Missolz)
- 2000: In extremis - Caroline
- 2000: La manipulation (directed by Nicolao Opritescu)
- 2002: The Truth About Charlie (directed by Jonathan Demme) - Commandant Dominique
- 2004: Maigret et L’Ombre Chinoise—The shadow Puppet (TV Series) - Germaine Martin
- 2004: La manipulation (directed by Marius Theodor Barna)
- 2008: J'ai rêvé sous l'eau - Fabienne
- 2009: All About Actresses - La prof de théâtre
- 2009: Une affaire d'état - Mado

== Stage ==
- 1977–1978: La mouette by Anton Chekhov (directed by Bruno Bayen)
- 1978: La mouette reprise at Théâtre Nanterre-Amandiers
- 1978: Etre vidé (directed by Remo Girones)
- 1978: Et pourtant ce silence ne pouvait by Magnan
- 1978: Antoine et Cléopâtre by William Shakespeare
- 1978: Périples, prince de Tyr by Shakespeare (directed by Roger Planchon) - T.N.P. Villeurbanne
- 1979: Lorenzaccio by Alfred de Musset (directed by Otomar Krejča)
- 1980–1981: La trilogie du revoir by Botho Strauss (directed by Claude Régy) - Théâtre Nanterre-Amandiers
- 1981–1982: Grand et petit by Botho Strauss (directed by Claude Régy) - T.N.P. Villeurbanne
- 1984: Par les villages by Peter Handke (directed by Claude Régy) - Théâtre national de Chaillot
- 1988: Des sentiments soudains by Jean-Louis Livi (directed by Jean Bouchaud) - Théâtre de la Renaissance
- 1989: Andromaque by Racine (directed by Roger Planchon) - T.N.P. Villeurbanne
- 1991–1992: C'était hier by Harold Pinter (directed by Sami Frey) - Tour
- 1993: La mégère apprivoisée by William Shakespeare (directed by Jérôme Savary) - Théâtre national de Chaillot, Théâtre de Nice
- 1995: Démons by Lars Norén (directed by Gérard Desarthe) - Théâtre de Vidy Lausanne, Tour 1996
- 1998: Ashes to Ashes by Harold Pinter (directed by Harold Pinter) - Théâtre du Rond-Point des Champs-Élysées
- 2001: Les monologues du vagin by Eve Ensler (directed by François-Louis Tilly) - Petit Théâtre de Paris
- 2002: La campagne by Martin Crimp (directed by Louis-Do de Lencquesaing)
- 2002: Le collier d'Hélène by Carole Frechette (directed by Michel Dumoulin)
- 2003: Les monologues du vagin
- 2005: Viol by Botho Strauss (directed by Luc Bondy)
