= Jean Baptiste Antoine Auget de Montyon =

French politician. lawyer and philanthropist (1733–1820)

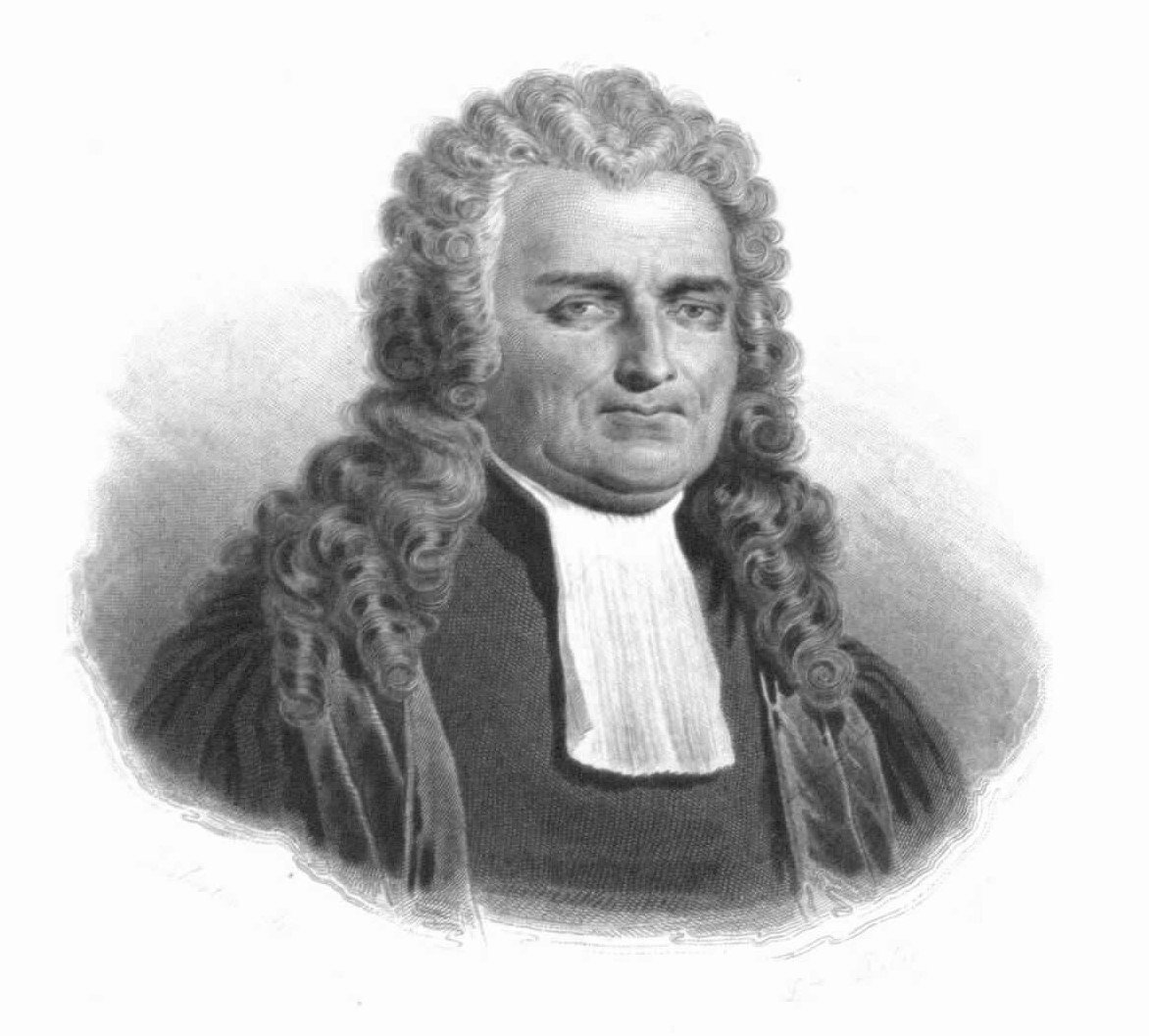
Portrait of de Montyon

Antoine Jean Baptiste Robert Auget, Baron de Montyon (23 December 1733 – 29 December 1820) was a French philanthropist, born in Paris.

== Biography ==
His father was a maître des comptes; he was educated in law, and became a lawyer at the Châtelet in 1755, maître des requêtes to the Conseil d'État in 1760, and intendant successively of Auvergne, Provence and La Rochelle. He had repeatedly shown great independence of character, protesting against the accusation of Louis-René de Caradeuc de La Chalotais in 1766, and refusing in 1771 to suppress the local courts of justice in obedience to Maupeou. He was made a councillor of state in 1775 by the influence of Louis de Bourbon, duke of Penthièvre, and in 1780 he was attached to the court in the honorary office of chancellor to the comte d'Artois (afterwards Charles X). He followed the princes into exile, and lived for some years in London. During the emigration period he spent large sums on the alleviation of the poverty of his fellow immigrants, returning to France only at the second restoration.

Between 1780 and 1787 he had founded a series of prizes, the awards to be made by the French academy and the academies of science and medicine. These prizes fell into abeyance during the revolutionary period, but were re-established in 1815. In 1812 he was elected a Fellow of the Royal Society of London.

When Montyon died, he bequeathed 12,000 francs for the perpetual endowment of each of the Montyon prizes: for the discovery of the means of rendering some mechanical process less dangerous to the workman; for the perfecting of any technical improvement in a mechanical process; for the book which during the year rendered the greatest service to humanity; the "prix de vertu" for the most courageous act on the part of a poor Frenchman; the awards being left as before to the learned academies. He also left 12,000 francs to each of the Parisian hospitals.

Montyon wrote a series of works, chiefly on political economy:

- Éloge de Michel de l'hôpital (Paris, 1777)
- Recherches et considérations sur la population de la France (1778), a share of which is attributed to his secretary, Moheau
- Rapport fait à Louis XVIII (Constance, 1796), in which he maintained in opposition to Calonne's Tableau de l'Europe that France had always possessed a constitution, which had, however, been violated by the kings of France
- L'état statistique du Tunkin (1811); and Particularités... sur les ministres des finances en France (1812).
