= Sandra Nettelbeck =

German film director and screenwriter (born 1966)

- Born: 4 April 1966 (age 60); Hamburg, West Germany
- Occupations: Film director, screenwriter
- Years active: 1994–present
- Awards: see below

Sandra Nettelbeck (born 4 April 1966) is a German film director and screenwriter, best known for her film Mostly Martha (2001).

== Early life ==
Sandra Nettelbeck was born 4 April 1966 in Hamburg, West Germany to Uwe Nettelbeck, a German record producer, journalist and film critic, and Petra Nettelbeck, an author, film producer, and actress. In 1988, Nettelbeck began formally studying film at San Francisco State University. While studying, Nettelbeck produced several videos and two 16mm films, including A Certain Grace in 1992, which she won Best Short Film at the San Francisco International Film Festival.

== Film career ==
Following her education, Nettelbeck worked for Spiegel TV and as a freelance editor for Premiere television between 1993 and 1994.

In 1996, Nettelbeck made her feature debut with Loose Ends.

In 1998, she wrote and directed the television film Mammamia, which won Best Screenplay and Best Film at the Ophuels Festival Saarbruecken.

In 2001, Nettelbeck wrote and directed the multiple-award-winning film, Mostly Martha. Her original screenplay was remade in 2007 by Warner Brothers, Castle Rock, and Village Roadshow, and renamed No Reservations.

In 2004, she wrote and directed Sergeant Pepper.

== Filmography ==
- A Certain Grace (1994, short film), director
- Loose Ends (1996, TV movie), director, screenplay, actor
- Mammamia (1998, TV movie), director, screenplay
- Mostly Martha (2001), director, screenplay
- Sergeant Pepper (2004), director, screenplay
- Helen (2009), director, screenplay
- Mr. Morgan's Last Love (2013), director, screenplay
- What Doesn't Kill Us (2018), director, screenplay

== Honors and awards ==
- 2002 Créteil International Women's Film Festival Grand Prix Award for Mostly Martha
- 2002 German Film Awards Outstanding Feature Film Nomination for Mostly Martha
- 2002 Nantucket Film Festival Best Feature Screenplay for Mostly Martha
- 2002 Lecce European Film Festival Special Jury Award for Mostly Martha
- 2002 Lecce European Film Festival Students Jury Award for Mostly Martha
- 2003 Goya Awards Best European Film for Mostly Martha
- 2004 Munich Film Festival White Elephant Award for Sergeant Pepper
