= Montyon Prize =

Group of four yearly awards of the French Academy

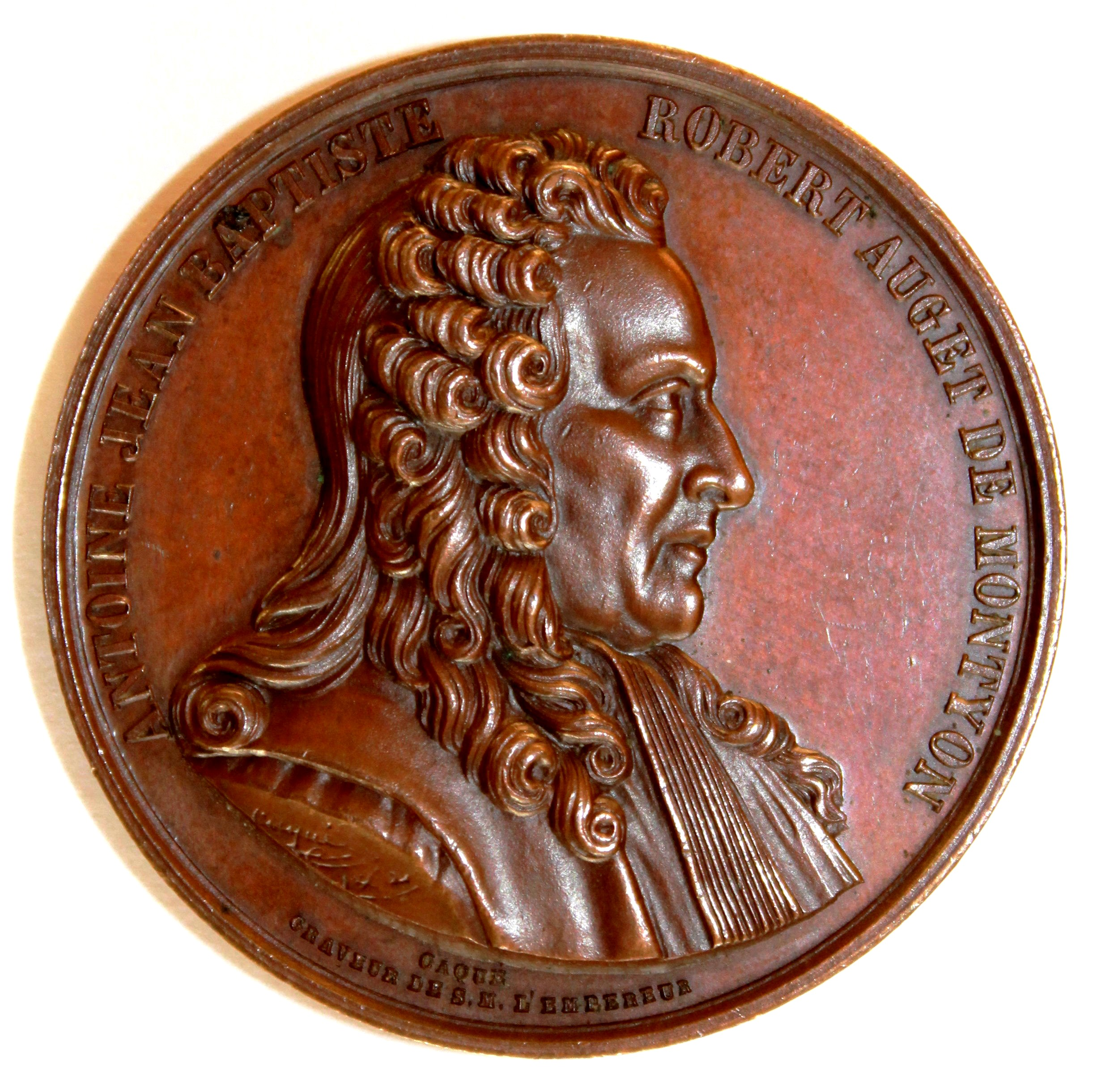

The Montyon Prize (French: Prix Montyon) is a series of prizes awarded annually by the French Academy of Sciences and the Académie française. They are endowed by the French benefactor Baron de Montyon.

== History ==
Prior to the start of the French Revolution, the Baron de Montyon established a series of prizes to be given away by the Académie Française, the Académie des Sciences, and the Académie Nationale de Médecine. These were abolished by the National Convention, but were taken up again when Baron de Montyon returned to France in 1815. When he died, he bequeathed a large sum of money for the perpetual endowment of four annual prizes. The endowed prizes were as follows:

- Making an industrial process less unhealthy
- Perfecting of any technical improvement in a mechanical process
- Book which during the year rendered the greatest service to humanity
- The "prix de vertu" for the most courageous act on the part of a poor Frenchman

These prizes were considered by some to be a forerunner of the Nobel Prize.

== List of winners ==
- A nurse named Lespagnier (1783)
- Jean Guénisset (1820)
- François-Xavier-Joseph Droz (1823)
- Antoine Germain Labarraque (1825)
- Friedrich Sertürner (1831)
- Alexis de Tocqueville (1835)
- Philippe Ricord (1842)
- Jeanne Jugan (1845)
- Adolphe Garnier (1850)
- Adolphe Garnier (1853)
- Henri Baudrillart (1858)
- Louis Pasteur (1859)
- Louis Melsens (1865)
- Jules Verne (1867)
- Joséphine Colomb (1875)
- Mary Mapes Dodge (1876)
- Axel Key (1878)
- Hector Malot (1878)
- George Henry Corliss (1879)
- Jacques-Arsène d'Arsonval (1882)
- Augustin Charpentier (1885)
- Victor André Cornil (1886)
- Louis Fréchette
- Charles Thomas Jackson
- Jean-Henri Fabre
- Marie Célestine Amélie d'Armaillé (1887)
- Claire Julie de Nanteuil (1888)
- Claire Julie de Nanteuil (1890)
- François Marie Galliot (1895)
- Juliette Heuzey (1897)
- Édouard Foà (1897 and 1901)
- Ludovic de Contenson (1902).
- Claude Ferval (1903)
- Laure Conan (1903)
- Paul Acker (1904)
- Charles Nicolle (1909, 1912, 1914)
- Edward Tuck and Julia Stell (1916)
- Victor Babeș (1924)
- Suzanne Lacascade (1925)
- Armand Praviel (1925)
- Suzanne Lavaud (1932)
- Louise Thuliez (1935)
- Valentine Thomson (1937)
- Germaine Acremant (1940)
- Ivan Đaja (1946)
- Daniel Dugué (1947)
- André Giroux (1949)
- Alix André (1951)
- Nicolas Minorsky (1955)
- Kitty Ponse
- Antoine de La Garanderie (1970)
- Gaston Bouthoul (1971)
- Bertrand de Margerie (1972)
- Dominique-Marie Dauzet (1996)
- Alexandre Jollien (2000)
- Alberte van Herwynen (2001)
- Charles-Nicolas Peaucellier
- René Guitton (2002)
- Michèle-Irène Brudny (2003)
- Jacques Julliard (2004)
- Joël Bouessée (2004)
- Henri Hude (2005)
- Renaud Girard (2006)
- Marie-Frédérique Pellegrin (2007)
- Jean-François Mattéi (2008)
- Myriam Revault D'Allonnes (2009)
- William Marx (2010)
- Stéphane Chauvier (2011)
- Bérénice Levet (2012)
- Anca Vasiliu (2013)
- Fabrice Wilhelm (2014)
- Nathalie Heinich (2015)
- Hervé Gaymard (2016)
- Denis Lacorne (2017)
- Gilles Lipovetsky (2018)
- Isabelle de Lamberterie (2019)
- Isabelle Mordant (2020)
- Jean Seidengart (2021)
- Neil MacGregor (2022)
