= Marie Lenéru =

French playwright and diarist (1875–1918)

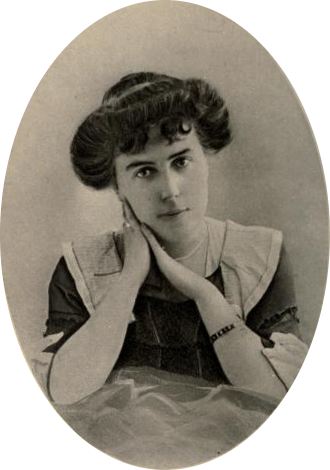
- Marie Lenéru at age 37
- Born: June 2, 1875; Brest, France
- Died: September 23, 1918 (aged 43); Lorient, France
- Resting place: Cimetière Saint-Martin de Brest
- Other name: Antoine Morsain (pseudonym)
- Occupations: playwright, diarist

Signature
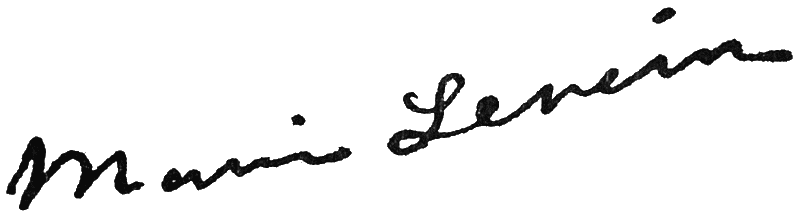

Marie Lenéru (June 2, 1875 – September 23, 1918) was a French playwright and diarist.

Lenéru became deaf and partially blind after contracting measles as a child. She was able to continue her education with the help of her mother, and in the 1910s she wrote several plays that were performed in Paris, notably Les Affranchis.

== Biography ==
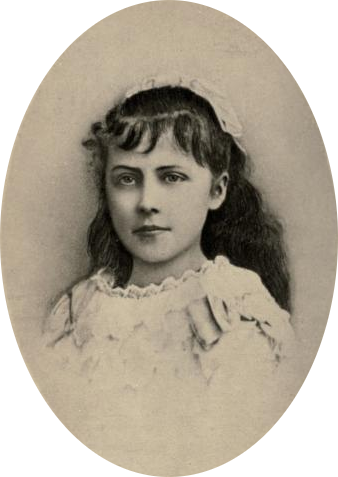
Marie Lenéru at age 10

Marie Lenéru was born in 1875 in Brest, France. Her family lived on rue de Siam. Her father Alfred Lenéru (1843–1876) was a naval lieutenant, a knight of the Legion of Honour, and a 1863 graduate of the École navale. He died when Marie was only 10 months old. The son of Parisian hoteliers, Alfred had married Marie Dauriac, the daughter of Rear Adm. Alexandre Dauriac and Augustine Hollard, in Brest in 1872. Other naval officers in Marie Lenéru's family included her great-grandfather Capt. Alexandre Dauriac and her uncles Commissioner General of the Navy Charles Dauriac and Capt. François Dauriac. She had one brother, Lionel Dauriac (1847–1923), who attended the École normale supérieure and became a philosophy professor and knight in the Legion of Honour.

In May 1887, after having measles, Marie Lenéru became deaf and blind. She was 11 years old. Her mother worked to continue her education, using only her sense of touch.

She eventually regained some of her eyesight, enabling her to write and read under a magnifying glass, but her deafness persisted. She died in 1918 in Lorient, during the Spanish flu pandemic.

Lenéru is perhaps best known as the subject of research by Suzanne Lavaud, the first deaf person to obtain a doctor of letters degree in France.

== Work ==
In 1908, Lenéru submitted a short story, titled La Vivante, to a literary competition organized by the newspaper Le Journal. Her victory in that competition marked her first success as a writer, drawing the attention of members of the French literary scene of the period including Catulle Mendès, Fernand Gregh, and Rachilde.

=== Playwright ===
She wrote her first play, Les Affranchis, in 1908, and sent it to Mendès, who became a significant supporter of her work until his death in 1909. The play won a 1,000 franc prize as an unpublished work, then was published by Hachette in 1910, but it went three years without being performed. Gregh wrote a preface for the 1910 printing, noting that Mendès would have done so had he not died the year prior. Eventually the theater director André Antoine decided to stage the play at the Odéon for the 1910–1911 season.

In 1914, the Académie Française awarded her the Prix Émile Augier for Less Affranchis. She was the first woman to receive the award.

After Lenéru's death, the play was republished by Georges Crès in 1926 and performed at the Comédie-Française in 1927.

With the success of Les Affranchis, several other plays written by Lenéru were staged in Paris: Le Redoutable in 1912, at the Odéon; La Triomphatrice in 1917, at the Comédie-Française; and La Paix in 1920, also at the Odéon. She also left several pieces that were not produced: La Maison sur le roc, Le Bonheur des autres, Les Lutteurs, Le Mahdi. These works were criticized by some as cold and intellectual, often focusing on couples in conflict over religion, family, or charity.

=== Historian and diarist ===
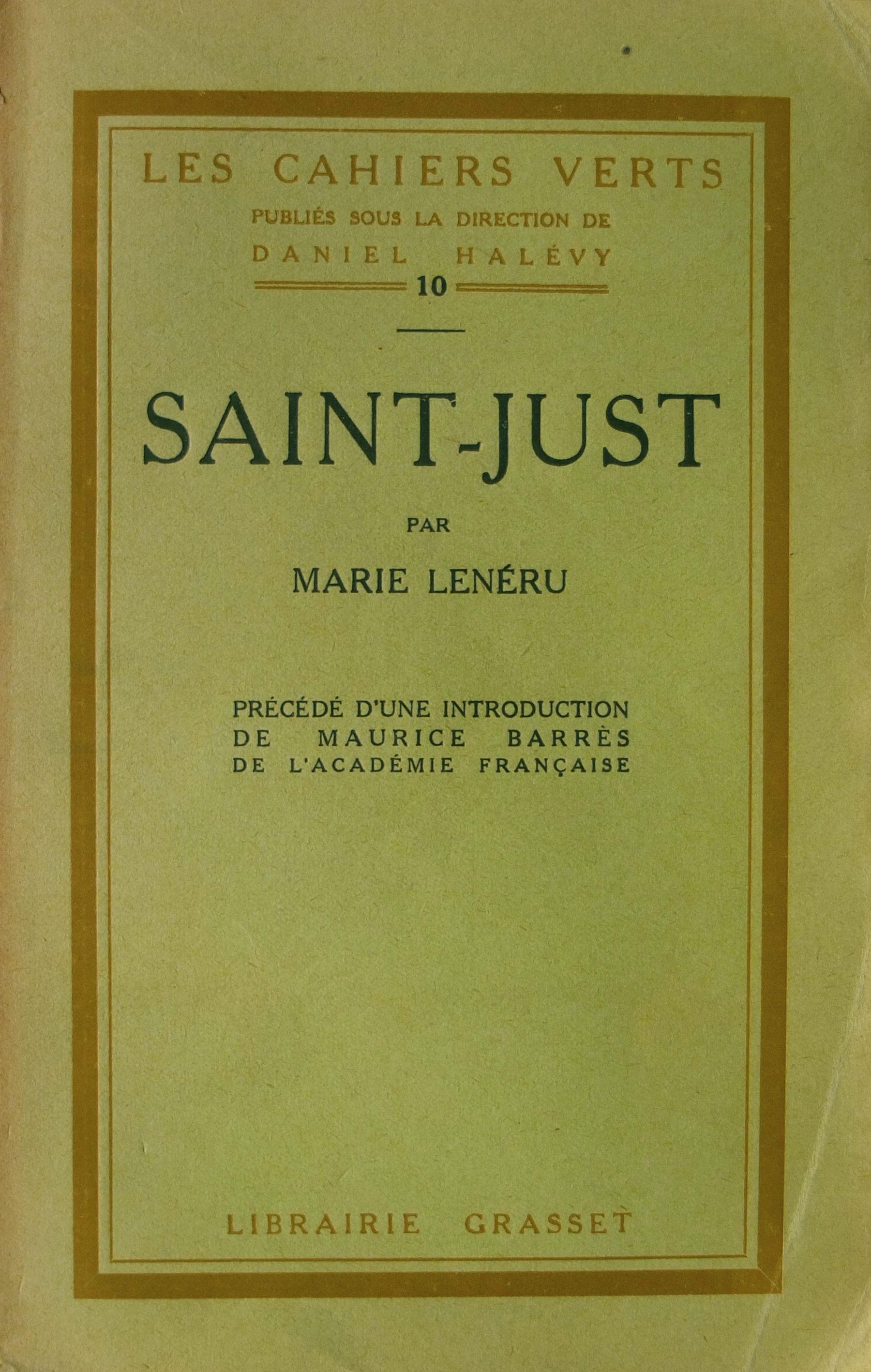
The cover of Marie Lenéru's study Saint-Just, published posthumously in 1922

In addition to her theatrical output, Lenéru also compiled research on significant historical figures, including a study of Louis Antoine de Saint-Just, a chapter of which was published in the Mercure de France under the pseudonym "Antoine Morsain". She also wrote Le Cas de Miss Helen Keller, a look into the life and work of her deaf-blind contemporary Helen Keller.

On her death, Lenéru left behind a diary, kept from 1893 until just before her death in 1918. In it, she stoically confides her sufferings and expresses an appetite for beauty and inner perfection that torments her. She describes her gradual loss of religious faith, which she replaced with a sort of pagan serenity and passion for life, as she finds fulfillment in writing.

The diary was published by Georges Crès in 1922, in two volumes with a preface by François de Curel. It was rereleased in 1945 by Grasset with a preface by Fernande Dauriac, and again in 2007 by Bartillat, with the first years of the diary removed.
