= Xavier Gélin =

French actor and film producer (1946–1999)

Xavier Gélin (21 June 1946 – 2 July 1999) was a French actor and film producer, and son of French film star Daniel Gélin and actress-producer Danièle Delorme. Through his father, he was a half-brother of Fiona Gélin and Maria Schneider, also actresses. Gélin, a French actor and a mainstay of popular French cinema for more than three decades, died of cancer at the age of 53.

He played supporting roles in more than 20 films, including Gerard Oury's 1973 comic hit "The Adventures of Rabbi Jacob" with Louis de Funes. He also starred in Claude Lelouche's "Adventure, It's Adventure" and "The Devil by the Tail" by Phillippe de Broca. Other hits include Claude Pinoteau's "The Slap" and "The Party-2."

== Filmography ==
- 1964: Cherchez l'idole - Un invité au spectacle de Sylvie Vartan (uncredited)
- 1967: Mise à sac - Michel Castagnier
- 1969: The Devil by the Tail - Charlie (Le petit garagiste)
- 1969: La maison de campagne - Gérard
- 1970: The Bear and the Doll - Reginald
- 1971: Macédoine - Le photographe
- 1971: Le juge - Antonio
- 1971: La ville-bidon - Un jeune cadre
- 1972: L'aventure, c'est l'aventure - Daniel Massaro, le fils de Lino
- 1972: Repeated Absences - Le 2e flic
- 1972: The Tall Blond Man with One Black Shoe - Young man in car hearing the toilet flushing in the florist van (uncredited)
- 1973: Ras le bol - Bertrand Guillou, dit Bert
- 1973: The Mad Adventures of Rabbi Jacob - Alexandre, le fils du général
- 1973: Hail the Artist - Le réalisateur énervé (uncredited)
- 1973: I Don't Know Much, But I'll Say Everything - Le fils à la sécurité sociale (uncredited)
- 1974: S*P*Y*S - Paul (Revolutionary)
- 1974: The Slap - Xavier
- 1974: The Return of the Tall Blond Man with One Black Shoe - Peintre à l'aéroport (uncredited)
- 1978: On peut le dire sans se fâcher - Un automobiliste
- 1978: Take It from the Top - Le mari
- 1978: A Simple Story - Denisold (uncredited)
- 1981: Signé Furax - Théo Courant
- 1982: La Boum 2 - Gilles (uncredited)
- 1989: Les cigognes n'en font qu'à leur tête - Le cuisinier (uncredited)
- 1990: Promotion canapé - Un proxénéte (uncredited)
- 1992: My Wife's Girlfriends - TV channel manager
- 1993: Coup de jeune - Un collègue de Anne-Christine (uncredited)
- 1993: Roulez jeunesse! - Jean's son
