= Moorsom =

Moorsom may refer to:

- Moorsom System for calculating tonnage of sailing ships
- HMS Moorsom, two Royal Navy ships
- PS Admiral Moorsom, named for Robert Moorsom

== People with the surname ==
- Constantine Richard Moorsom (1792–1861), Royal Navy admiral, businessman and abolitionist
- James Marshall Moorsom (1837–1918), British Liberal Party politician
- Lewis Moorsom (1835–1914), English cricketer
- Robert Moorsom (1760–1835), Royal Navy admiral
- William Moorsom (1804–1863), English engineer

== See also ==
- Moorsom family tree: showing relationships between some of the above
