= Colomb =

Colomb is a surname which may refer to:

- Friedrich August Peter von Colomb (1775–1854), Prussian general
- George Thomas Colomb (1787–1874), British Army general and talented amateur artist
- Georges Colomb (1856–1945), French botanist, science populariser and pioneer of French comics
- Georges Colomb (born 1953), French missionary and bishop
- Gregory G. Colomb (1951–2011), American professor of the English language and literature
- John Colomb (1838–1909), British naval strategist, younger brother of Philip Howard Colomb
- Joséphine Colomb (1833–1892), French children's writer, lyricist, translator
- Philip Howard Colomb (1831–1899), British royal navy vice-admiral, elder brother of John Colomb
- Tazzie Colomb (born 1966), American professional female bodybuilder and powerlifter

== See also ==
- Yvonne Dorsey-Colomb (born 1952), American politician from Louisiana
- Michel Colombe (c. 1430 – c. 1513), French sculptor
- Collomb (surname)
- Coulomb (disambiguation)
