= Bull bridge accident =

1860 train accident

Coordinates: 53.0664°N 1.4639°W

The Bull Bridge accident was a failure of a cast-iron bridge at Bullbridge, near Ambergate in Derbyshire on 26 September 1860. As a goods train was passing over the bridge at Bullbridge, the structure failed suddenly, causing the derailment of the majority of the wagons. There were no serious casualties, but it was a warning of the fundamental weakness of many such bridges on the British rail network.

== The accident ==
The accident happened on the Midland Railway between Derby and Chesterfield, on the night of 26 September 1860. With visibility only about 10 yards (9.1 m) due to fog, the train was proceeding northwards at only 14 mph (23 km/h). It was a long train, with twenty-seven wagons loaded with salt, two loaded goods vans, and a brake van, hauled by a tender locomotive. The heavy load caused some slippage of the engine's driving wheels on the rail. Half a mile (800 m) beyond Ambergate station, the driver suddenly noticed that the engine's rear wheels were no longer on the rails. He shut off steam, stopped the engine and went to investigate. His tender was attached to only two wagons, and they were all off the rails too. There were two more wagons about 10 yards (9.1 m) behind, close to Bull bridge, a small viaduct over a local road. The next nine wagons behind were piled in a heap about 25 feet (7.6 m) high from the bottom of the road, reaching up to the telegraph wires by the side of the track. The guard in the brake van had been thrown headfirst against the front panel when the accident occurred but was not seriously hurt. All the wagons behind the bridge were still on the line.

== Investigation ==
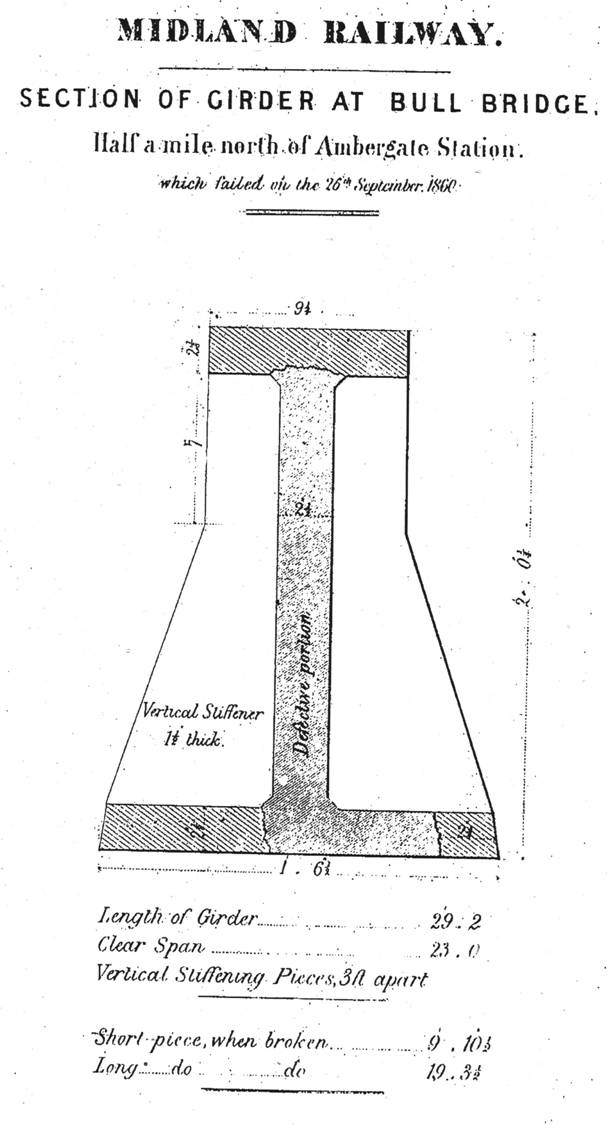
Section of broken girder

When examined by the driver and fireman, one of the cast-iron girders of the bridge was found to have fractured, unusually, near to one of the abutments rather than at the centre of the beam. The track was supported by a pair of identical girders with Barlow rails cut to length laid across the inner flange, with asphalted ballast on top, just below the sleepers. When Captain Henry Whatley Tyler of the Railway Inspectorate examined the fracture surface, he found it rusted over, but the evidence of those who had seen it first showed just what had happened. The cast iron girder had broken vertically from an enormous defect in the web and flanges, where there was a complete gap between the sides. The girder was completely defective here, but why no one had spotted it before the accident remains a mystery. Tyler suggests that it may have grown from an internal void with time simply because such a defect would surely have been discovered either by the foundry or the builders. The girder had been installed 23 years before, in 1837, and should have supported a central load of 90 long tons (91,000 kg) if in good condition. The pair of girders should have supported a total load of 360 long tons (370,000 kg) distributed over all the structure, and Tyler stated that the girder was much bigger than was needed for the job. The engine weighed 31 long tons (31,000 kg) and the tender 18 long tons (18,000 kg).

The source of the defect remains unknown but may have been caused initially by a "cold shut," where the molten metal does not fuse during metal casting. It often occurs when two waves of fast cooling cast iron meet, but why it should have occurred only about 10 feet (3.0 m) from one end remains unknown. It could have grown with repeated loading from passing traffic, and Tyler thought it lucky that it had failed when a goods train passed, rather than a passenger train, when casualties would have been inevitable. So it is possible that fatigue had caused the failure by the steady growth of a brittle crack from the initial defect.

== Implications ==
Together with the Wootton bridge collapse the following year in 1861, there should have been some concern within the railway companies about the number of cast-iron girders used as underbridges on railway lines. Engineers would also have been aware of the problems of cast iron in railway bridges after the failure of the Dee bridge in 1847. Whether or not such structures were inspected is unknown; it seems not, as several more collapses occurred some years later, at the Inverythan crash and the Norwood Junction rail accident in 1891. Thereafter, the vast majority of cast-iron underbridges on the rail network were eventually replaced by wrought iron or steel structures, although some cast-iron underbridges remain today, e.g. Robert Stephenson's High Level Bridge in Newcastle.
