= Enoch Storer =

English cricketer

Personal information
- Born: 18 May 1838; Clay Cross, Derbyshire, England
- Died: 1 July 1880 (aged 42); Hulme, Lancashire, England
- Height: 5 ft 7 in (170 cm)
- Batting: Left-handed
- Bowling: Right-arm fast

Domestic team information
- Years: Team
- 1865–1878: Lancashire
- FC debut: 7 August 1865 Lancashire v Middlesex
- Last FC: 24 June 1878 Lancashire v Derbyshire

Career statistics
Competition	First-class
Matches	6
Runs scored	46
Batting average	7.66
100s/50s	0/0
Top score	23
Balls bowled	638
Wickets	15
Bowling average	16.33
5 wickets in innings	1
10 wickets in match	0
Best bowling	5/12
Catches/stumpings	2/–
- Source: CricketArchive, 27 February 2011

Enoch Storer (18 May 1838 – 1 July 1880) was an English cricketer who played first-class cricket for Lancashire between 1865 and 1878.

Storer was born at Clay Cross, Derbyshire. He became a cricket professional at Ashton-under-Lyne in 1861. He played for Boughton in 1863 and in 1864 spent a year at Exeter College, Oxford. At the end of the 1864 season he moved on the Longsight Club at Manchester. He made his debut for Lancashire in the club's second first-class match which was against Middlesex in August 1865. He accompanied three amateurs from Longsight - Edwin Bousfield, Lewis Moorsom and R.Slater He scored 6 not out and 23, and took one wicket for 29 runs. In 1866, he was playing for Kendal and Players of Lancashire. He played two matches for Lancashire in 1867 and one in 1868. In 1869, he umpired two first-class Lancashire matches and was with the Manchester Club. From 1870 to 1875 he was at Bury. In 1877, he was with the Broughton Club at Manchester and started umpiring Lancashire matches again at Old Trafford. He returned to the Manchester Club in 1878 and in addition to umpiring, he played two matches for Lancashire in the season. In his last match he achieved his best bowling performance against his native county, Derbyshire when he took five wickets for 12 runs in the first innings and three for 25 in the second innings.

Storer was a left-hand batsman and played eleven innings in six first-class matches with an average of 7.66 and a top score of 23. He was a right-arm round arm fast bowler and took 15 wickets at an average of 16.33 and a best performance of 5 for 12. He usually fielded at slip where he took two catches.

Storer died at Hulme, Lancashire at the age of 42 and a charity match was played on behalf of his wife and children on 30 April 1881.
