= List of shipwrecks in January 1885 =

The list of shipwrecks in January 1885 includes ships sunk, foundered, grounded, or otherwise lost during January 1885.

== 2 January ==
List of shipwrecks: 2 January 1885
Ship	State	Description
Arrival	United States	The schooner was run down and sunk off "Salvages". Her crew made it to shore in her dories. She was on a voyage from Grand Manan, New Brunswick, Canada to Gloucester, Massachusetts.
Louisa Price	United Kingdom	The ship ran aground and was wrecked at Barranquilla, United States of Colombia. Her crew were rescued. She was on a voyage from Barranquilla to Boston, Massachusetts, United States.

== 3 January ==
List of shipwrecks: 3 January 1885
Ship	State	Description
Mary Celeste	United States	The brigantine was deliberately wrecked on the Rochelois Bank, off Gonâve Island, Haiti.

== 4 January ==
List of shipwrecks: 4 January 1885
Ship	State	Description
Delphus	United Kingdom	The steamship ran aground at Sunderland, County Durham. She was on a voyage from Barrow-in-Furness, Lancashire to Sunderland. She was refloated and beached, but capsized.
Jane Pardew	United Kingdom	The barque struck a rock 14 nautical miles (26 km) south of Cape Spartel, Morocco and was wrecked. Her crew were rescued by the barque Catterina B. (Austria-Hungary).

== 5 January ==
List of shipwrecks: 5 January 1885
Ship	State	Description
Unnamed	Flag unknown	A ship was driven ashore at Llangwyfan, Anglesey.
Unnamed	Flag Unknown	A steamship ran aground at "False Rasgharet", in the Red Sea.

== 6 January ==
List of shipwrecks: 6 January 1885
Ship	State	Description
David G. Worth	United Kingdom	The ship departed from Wilmington, North Carolina, United States, for Liverpool, Lancashire. No further trace, reported overdue.

== 7 January ==
List of shipwrecks: 7 January 1885
Ship	State	Description
Countess	United Kingdom	The ship ran aground near Montrose, Forfarshire.

== 8 January ==
List of shipwrecks: 8 January 1885
Ship	State	Description
John	United Kingdom	The schooner was driven ashore at Cranstall, Isle of Man. She was on a voyage from Runcorn, Cheshire to Peel, Isle of Man.
Musgrave	United Kingdom	The steamship was wrecked near Negombo, Ceylon. Her crew were rescued. She was on a voyage from Liverpool, Lancashire to Brisbane, Queensland.
René	France	The barque struck the Helwick Bank, in the Bristol Channel and subsequently drove ashore at Overton, Glamorgan, United Kingdom with the loss of four of her nine crew. She was on a voyage from Cardiff, Glamorgan to Arcachon, Gironde.
Rover of the Seas	United Kingdom	The ship was damaged by fire at Victoria, British Columbia, Canada.
Vale of Calder	United Kingdom	The steamship ran aground at Limerick. She was on a voyage from Liverpool to Limerick.
Wigtownshire	United Kingdom	The barque was wrecked in Struys Bay. Her crew were rescued. She was on a voyage from Calcutta, India to London.

== 9 January ==
List of shipwrecks: 9 January 1885
Ship	State	Description
Alleghany	United Kingdom	The steamship departed from Cardiff, Glamorgan for Point de Galle, Ceylon. Presumed subsequently foundered with the loss of all hands; two lifebuoys washed up at the Mumbles, Glamorgan in February.

== 10 January ==
List of shipwrecks: 10 January 1885
Ship	State	Description
Margaret	United Kingdom	The schooner collided with the steamship Grantham (United Kingdom) and sank in the English Channel off Dungeness, Kent. Her crew were rescued by Grantham, which lost her mate clearing the wreck of Margaret from the steamship's bow.

== 11 January ==
List of shipwrecks: 11 January 1885
Ship	State	Description
Alice	United Kingdom	The brigantine was wrecked "at the entrance of Soca" with the loss of two lives. She was on a voyage from Lisbon, Portugal to Bayonne, Loire-Inférieure.
Matador	United Kingdom	The steamship foundered 50 nautical miles (93 km) south south west of The Lizard, Cornwall with the loss of thirteen of her fifteen crew. Survivors were rescued by the schooner Elfrida (United Kingdom). Matador was on a voyage from Santander, Spain to Glasgow, Renfrewshire.
Triumph	United Kingdom	The steamship ran aground on the Lamaron Rock and was damaged. She was beached at Dartmouth, Devon. She was on a voyage from Odesa, Russia to London.

== 12 January ==
List of shipwrecks: 12 January 1885
Ship	State	Description
Canoese	United Kingdom	The barque was wrecked on the Kentish Knock.
Carmarthenshire	United Kingdom	The barque was driven ashore and wrecked on Terschelling, Friesland, Netherlands. Her crew were rescued by a Belgian fishing smack. She was on a voyage from Bangkok, Siam to Bremen, Germany.
San Giuseppe	Italy	The schooner was wrecked at Livorno with some loss of life.

== 14 January ==
List of shipwrecks: 14 January 1885
Ship	State	Description
Chamois	United Kingdom	The steamship ran aground off Livorno, Italy.
Eleanor	United Kingdom	The steamship collided with the steamship Stanley at Holyhead, Anglesey. Eleanor was nearly cut in two and drifted ashore. There were no deaths.
Guyenne	France	The steamship ran aground on the Kimmeridge Ledge, in the English Channel off the coast of Dorset. She was on a voyage from Bilbao, Spain to Dunkirk, Nord. She was refloated and assisted in to Weymouth, Dorset by tugs.
Harbinger	United Kingdom	The steamship ran aground at Charleston, South Carolina, United States. She was on a voyage from Charleston to Grimsby, Lincolnshire. She was refloated and found to be severely leaky.
Margaret Jane	United Kingdom	The schooner struck the Runnel Stone and sank. Her crew took to the boats; they were rescued by the ketch Bonito ( (United Kingdom of Great Britain and Ireland) Jersey). Margaret Jane was on a voyage from Plymouth, Devon to Runcorn, Cheshire.
Simla	United Kingdom	The ship sank at the Nore. She was being towed from Gravesend, Kent to Liverpool, Lancashire by the tug Gamecock (United Kingdom).
Slaney	United Kingdom	The steamship ran aground at Wexford. All on board were rescued by the Wexford Lifeboat Civil Service ( Royal National Lifeboat Institution) and the tug Ruby (United Kingdom). Slaney was on a voyage from Liverpool, Lancashire to Wexford.

== 15 January ==
List of shipwrecks: 15 January 1885
Ship	State	Description
Acuba	United Kingdom	The steamship put in to Dover, Kent on fire. She was on a voyage from Galveston, Texas, United States to Bremen, Germany. The fire was extinguished on 20 January.
Admiral Moorsom	United Kingdom	The passenger paddle steamer collided with Santa Clara (United States) and sank in the Irish Sea off Arklow, County Wicklow with the loss of five of the 35 people on board. Survivors were rescued by Santa Clara and the steamship Falcon (United Kingdom). Admiral Moorsom was on a voyage from Dublin to Holyhead, Anglesey.
Darien	United Kingdom	The steamship was driven ashore at Riposto, Italy and broke in two.
Mary Seymour	United Kingdom	The schooner ran aground in the Thames Estuary off Shoeburyness, Essex. She was on a voyage from London to Charleston, South Carolina, United States. She was refloated and towed in to Gravesend, Kent.
Rose English	United Kingdom	The steamship struck the pier and sank at Amble, Northumberland. Her crew survived. She was on a voyage from Dundee, Forfarshire to Amble.
Trafik	Sweden	The steamship caught fire whilst on a voyage from Danzig, Germany to Palmas.

== 16 January ==
List of shipwrecks: 16 January 1885
Ship	State	Description
Cordella	United Kingdom	The steamship was driven ashore and became a total wreck in St Bride's Bay. Her crew were rescued.
Olivia	United Kingdom	The schooner was driven on to rocks and became a total wreck at Sunderland, County Durham.
Tevere	Italy	The steamship was wrecked at Porto Lungone. She was on a voyage from Genoa to Rome.

== 17 January ==
List of shipwrecks: 17 January 1885
Ship	State	Description
Lady Ann Duff	United Kingdom	The ship was driven ashore and wrecked at Sunderland, County Durham with the loss of two of her crew.
Northern Chief	United Kingdom	The ship departed from New York, United States for Antwerp, Belgium. No further trace, reported missing.
Windermere	United Kingdom	The ship was driven ashore at New Romney, Kent. She was on a voyage from London to Rangoon, Burma. She was refloated with assistance on 27 January and put back to London.

== 18 January ==
List of shipwrecks: 18 January 1885
Ship	State	Description
Bedfordshire	Sweden	The schooner was driven ashore at Sunderland, County Durham, United Kingdom with the loss of her captain. She was on a voyage from Savannah, Georgia, United States to Gothenburg. She subsequently became a wreck.
Carl W. Baxter	United States	The schooner was dismasted in a strong gale between Brown's Bank and the Georges Bank. One crewman was drowned. The surviving crewmen were taken off by a steamship on 20 or 21 January.
Dewa Gungadhur	United Kingdom	The ship was driven ashore and wrecked in Shoalwater Bay. Her crew were rescued. She was on a voyage from Callao, Peru to Portland, Oregon, United States.
Rosslyn	United Kingdom	The steamship struck a sunken wreck and was wrecked at "Taka", French Indo-China. All on board were rescued. She was on a voyage from Hong Kong to Saigon, French Indo-China.

== 19 January ==
List of shipwrecks: 19 January 1885
Ship	State	Description
Cowden Law	United Kingdom	The ship was destroyed by fire in the Pacific Ocean. Her crew were rescued by the barque Leopold Marie (France). Cowden Law was on a voyage from South Shields, County Durham to San Francisco, California, United States.

== 20 January ==
List of shipwrecks: 20 January 1885
Ship	State	Description
Coila	United Kingdom	The brigantine foundered in the English Channel 15 nautical miles (28 km) off Portland, Dorset. Her crew were rescued by the steamship Chilton (United Kingdom). Coila was on a voyage from Poole, Dorset to Runcorn, Cheshire.
Fernwood	United Kingdom	The steamship departed from New York, United States for Avonmouth, Somerset. No further trace, reported missing.
Harvest Maid	United Kingdom	The schooner ran into Concord (United Kingdom) 20 nautical miles (37 km) south east by south of St Anthony's Lighthouse, Cornwall and was abandoned. Her crew were rescued by Concord. Harvest Maid was on a voyage from Bremen, Germany to Cardiff, Glamorgan.
Preston	United Kingdom	The steamship departed from New York for Avonmouth. No further trace, reported missing.
Standard	United Kingdom	The steamship departed from Boston, Massachusetts, United States for West Hartlepool, County Durham. No further trace, presumed foundered with the loss of all hands.

== 21 January ==
List of shipwrecks: 21 January 1885
Ship	State	Description
Hilda	United Kingdom	The schooner was driven ashore and wrecked at Larache, Morocco.
Hoselaw	United Kingdom	The steamship struck a sunken wreck and foundered off Ouessant, Finistère, France. Her crew survived.
Lerrin	United Kingdom	The schooner capsized and went ashore at Breaksea Point, Glamorgan, becoming a wreck.

== 22 January ==
List of shipwrecks: 22 January 1885
Ship	State	Description
Acuba	United Kingdom	The steamship caught fire at Dover, Kent.
Breadalbane	United Kingdom	The schooner was stranded at Cairnbulg, Aberdeenshire. Her crew stayed on board and she was refloated the same day.
Comtesse Duchatel	France	The ship was driven ashore near Ramsey, Isle of Man.
John Barrow	United Kingdom	The steamship ran aground at "86" (East Hoyle Bank) in the River Mersey approaches, without signalling distress.

== 23 January ==
List of shipwrecks: 23 January 1885
Ship	State	Description
County of Cardigan	United Kingdom	The ship was driven ashore at Cardiff, Glamorgan. She was on a voyage from Liverpool, Lancashire to Bombay, India. She was refloated on 28 January and taken in to Penarth, Glamorgan.

== 24 January ==
List of shipwrecks: 24 January 1885
Ship	State	Description
Clandon	United Kingdom	The steamship departed from New York, United States for Leith, Lothian. No further trace, reported missing.
Mary Anning	United Kingdom	The steamship was run into by the steamship Argus (United Kingdom) and sank off Greenock, Renfrewshire. Her crew were rescued. Mary Anning was on a voyage from Glasgow, Renfrewshire to Odesa, Russian Empire.
Marys	United Kingdom	The fishing boat was swamped in the North Sea about three miles (4.8 km) off Stonehaven, Aberdeenshire. Four of her six crew were drowned.
St. John	United States	The steamship was destroyed by fire at New York.
Unanima	United Kingdom	The ship collided with the steamship Oranmore (United Kingdom) at Liverpool, Lancashire and was severely damaged. Unanima was on a voyage from New York to Liverpool.

== 25 January ==
List of shipwrecks: 25 January 1885
Ship	State	Description
Alfred	Norway	The barque was abandoned in the Atlantic Ocean with the loss of eight of her twelve crew. Survivors were rescued by Lillian M. Vigus (United States). Alfred was on a voyage from Pensacola, Florida, United States to Liverpool, Lancashire, United Kingdom.
Ashfield	United Kingdom	The steamship ran aground on the Kentish Knock. She was on a voyage from Aarhus, Denmark to the River Tyne. She was refloated with assistance from the tug Harwich (United Kingdom), smacks and a lifeboat.
Elise	Belgium	The steamship ran aground at Killard Point, Ballyhornan, County Down, United Kingdom and was wrecked.
Sappemeer	Flag unknown	The schooner was wrecked off the Backpools,3 nautical miles (5.6 km) west of Macduff, Aberdeenshire, United Kingdom. Her crew survived. She was on a voyage from Sunderland, County Durham to Lossiemouth, Moray.
Standard	United Kingdom	The steamship was sighted whilst on a voyage from Boston, Massachusetts, United States to London. No further trace, reported missing.

== 26 January ==
List of shipwrecks: 26 January 1885
Ship	State	Description
Carbonic	United Kingdom	The steamship was driven ashore 3 nautical miles (5.6 km) north of Ballygalley, County Antrim. She was on a voyage from Glasgow, Renfrewshire to Glenarm, County Antrim.
Imperial Prince	United Kingdom	The paddle tug was run into by the steamship Zingara (United Kingdom) and severely damaged in the River Tyne.
Noviafjeld	Norway	The ship was driven ashore and wrecked at Craster, Northumberland, United Kingdom. She was later refloated and towed in to Amble, Northumberland in a waterlogged condition.
Orion	United Kingdom	The fishing smack was run down and sunk in the Swin, Thames Estuary, by the steamship James Southern (United Kingdom). Her crew were rescued by the steamer and brought ashore by the smack Vestal (United Kingdom) the following day.

== 27 January ==
List of shipwrecks: 27 January 1885
Ship	State	Description
Chepica	United Kingdom	The barque grounded on a reef and was wrecked at the Nieuwe Diep, Holland, after her anchor cable parted. Her crew were rescued. She was on a voyage from Haiti to Hamburg, Germany.
Favourite	United Kingdom	The fishing smack collided with the steamship New Minster (United Kingdom) and sank 1/2 nautical mile (930 m) off the Spurn Lightship ( Trinity House).
Northerner	United Kingdom	The schooner foundered 2 nautical miles (3.7 km) south west of Dodman Point, Cornwall. Her crew survived. She was on a voyage from Liverpool, Lancashire to Yarm, Yorkshire.

== 28 January ==
List of shipwrecks: 28 January 1885
Ship	State	Description
Castor	Royal Navy	The training ship was run into at South Shields, County Durham by the steamship Mercator (United Kingdom), which was trying to avoid a collision with the steamship Winthorpe (United Kingdom).
Erin	United Kingdom	The schooner was driven ashore at Wexford. She was on a voyage from Wexford to Dublin.
Giorgino	Italy	The barque was driven ashore at Newcastle, County Wicklow, United Kingdom. Her crew survived. She was on a voyage from Dublin to Cardiff, Glamorgan, United Kingdom.
Guerrero	Italy	The brigantine was driven ashore and severely damaged at Newcastle. Her crew survived. She was on a voyage from Dublin to Cardiff.
Maggie	United Kingdom	The fishing smack collided with the schooner John Shelley (United Kingdom) and sank off St. John's Point, County Antrim. Her crew were rescued by John Shelley.

== 29 January ==
List of shipwrecks: 29 January 1885
Ship	State	Description
Benwell Tower	United Kingdom	The steamship was abandoned in the Atlantic Ocean, disabled and sinking, after the loss of two of her crew. Survivors were rescued by the steamship Gladiolus (United Kingdom). Benwell Tower was on a voyage from Baltimore, Maryland, United States to Liverpool, Lancashire.
Princess Marie	United Kingdom	The schooner was driven ashore at Maughold Head, Isle of Man. Her crew were rescued.. She was on a voyage from Runcorn, Cheshire to Port William, Wigtownshire.
Rosebud	United Kingdom	The steamship was driven ashore east of Gourock, Renfrewshire. She was on a voyage from Glasgow, Renfrewshire to Bordeaux, Gironde, France. She was refloated and resumed her voyage.
Storm King	United Kingdom	The tug was run into by the steamship Oregon (United Kingdom) at New Brighton, Cheshire and was severely damaged. She was beached.

== 30 January ==
List of shipwrecks: 30 January 1885
Ship	State	Description
Anne	United Kingdom	The smack ran aground on the Beulah Rock, in the Swillies. She was on a voyage from Menai Bridge, Anglesey to Caernarfon.
Edwin	United Kingdom	The Mersey Flat was run into by the steamship Anerley (United Kingdom) and sank at Liverpool, Lancashire. Her crew were rescued.
Irwin	United Kingdom	The steamship was driven from her moorings at Bilbao, Spain. She collided with a French steamship, was driven ashore, and was severely damaged. She was refloated, temporary repairs were made, and she sailed to Newport, Monmouthshire.
Mary Helen	United Kingdom	The ship was driven ashore and wrecked in Dundrum Bay.

== 31 January ==
List of shipwrecks: 31 January 1885
Ship	State	Description
Wellington	Canada	On 29 January the barque drifted aground on mud 1 nautical mile (1.9 km) up the River Yealm, Devon, while under tow of the Government tug Scotia in a gale, having put back from a voyage from Le Havre, France to New York, United States after a disturbance from which the captain and two of the crew died. She was refloated and taken to Plymouth Sound but on 31 January she broke from her buoy in a gale and grounded under The Hoe. She was towed off by Scotia, and found to be leaking.

== Unknown date ==
List of shipwrecks: Unknown date in January 1885
Ship	State	Description
Aberdeen	United States	The ship was driven ashore at Barnegat, New Jersey. She was on a voyage from Mobile, Alabama to Boston, Massachusetts.
Anto	Russia	The barque ran aground on the Couch Reef. She was on a voyage from Pensacola, Florida, United States to the River Tyne. She was refloated and taken in to Key West, Florida, in a severely leaky condition.
Birthday, and Hugh and Ann	United Kingdom	The ketch Birthday collided with the schooner Hugh and Ann off the Tongue Lightship ( Trinity House). Both vessels sank; two of the five crew of Hugh and Ann drowned. Survivors were rescued by the steamship Carron (United Kingdom). Birthday was on a voyage from Penryn, Cornwall to Putney, Surrey. Hugh and Ann was on a voyage from Gravesend, Kent to Haverfordwest, Pembrokeshire.
Bordein	(Ottoman Empire) Egypt	Siege of Khartoum: The ship was holed when she struck a rock in the River Nile and was abandoned. Men, guns and stores were all landed.
Canosa	United Kingdom	The barque was wrecked on the Kentish Knock, Thames Estuary, England. Her twelve crew were rescued by the smack Nelson (United Kingdom).
Cavendish	United Kingdom	The steamship was driven ashore 15 nautical miles (28 km) south of Chioggia, Italy between 15 and 19 January.
Cher	French Navy	The transport ship was wrecked off Noumea, New Caledonia before 28 January.
Dauntless	United Kingdom	The tug ran aground in the River Suir 5 nautical miles (9.3 km) downstream of Waterford.
Dordogne	France	The steamship was wrecked on the Creadonnière Rocks. She was on a voyage from Cardiff, Glamorgan, United Kingdom to Bordeaux, Gironde.
Frans	United Kingdom	The ship was driven ashore in the Hooghly River. She was later refloated and put back to Calcutta, India.
Fratelli Maggiolo	Italy	The ship was driven ashore on Trinidad.
Hainan	Norway	The barque abandoned in the Mediterranean Sea. She was discovered by the steamship SS Clan Alpine (1878) (United Kingdom), which towed her in to Marseille, Bouches-du-Rhône, France.
Innisfail	United Kingdom	The brig was driven ashore on the Canadian coast. She was on a voyage from Pernambuco, Brazil to Halifax, Nova Scotia, Canada. She was refloated and put in to Lunenburg, Nova Scotia.
Kirtle	United Kingdom	The steamship arrived at Baltimore, Maryland, United States with bunker coal on fire. She was on a voyage from Boston, Massachusetts to Baltimore.
Margaret	United Kingdom	The fishing trawler was driven ashore between Skelmorlie and Largs, Ayrshire.
Medora	Italy	The barque ran aground off Goletta, Tunisia. She was on a voyage from Cardiff to Tunis, Tunisia.
Midas	United Kingdom	The barque ran aground at Key West. She was on a voyage from Pensacola to Montevideo, Uruguay. She was refloated with assistance and taken in to Key West.
Nora	France	The steamship caught fire at Havre de Grâce, Seine-Inférieure. She was on a voyage from Dunkirk, Nord to Havre de Grâce.
Omega	Germany	The schooner was destroyed by fire at sea. Her crew were rescued.
Orinoco	United Kingdom	The schooner was driven ashore at Fort Carlisle, County Cork. All on board were rescued. Orinoco was on a voyage from Whitegate, County Cork to Newport, Monmouthshire. She subsequently became a wreck.
Ossian	United Kingdom	The ship ran aground on the Vinolière. She was on a voyage from the Charente to Bristol, Gloucestershire. She was refloated and put in to Le Conquet, Finistère, France.
Pharos	United Kingdom	The steamship ran aground on the As Sentiyab Reef, in the Red Sea. She was on a voyage from Port Said, Egypt to Kurrachee, India. She was later refloated and taken in to Perim, Aden Settlement.
R. L. Alston	United Kingdom	The steamship was driven ashore and wrecked at Killard Point, County Clare. Her crew were rescued. She was on a voyage from Bilbao, Spain to Glasgow, Renfrewshire.
Roney	Austria-Hungary	The brigantine was driven ashore in the Tuspan River.
Sandemanden	Flag unknown	The ship was driven ashore at Savannah, Georgia, United States. She was refloated and found to be leaky.
Solva	Sweden	The steamship was driven ashore at Torekov.
Tellhoweiya	(Ottoman Empire) Egypt	Siege of Khartoum: The steamship sank between two rocks in the River Nile downstream of Jebel Royan. Guns, baggage, crew and soldiers were put on a large unmasted nuggar.
William	United Kingdom	The schooner was driven ashore at Rhyl, Denbrighshire. She was on a voyage from Liverpool to Rhyl.
Unnamed	Flag unknown	A schooner was driven ashore at Point St. Quentin, Somme, France.
Unnamed	Russia	A steamship was driven ashore and wrecked at Sfântu Gheorge, Romania. She was on a voyage from Varna, Bulgaria to Odesa.
