= Wootton bridge collapse =

1861 railway incident in England

Coordinates: 52°19′01″N 1°33′52″W

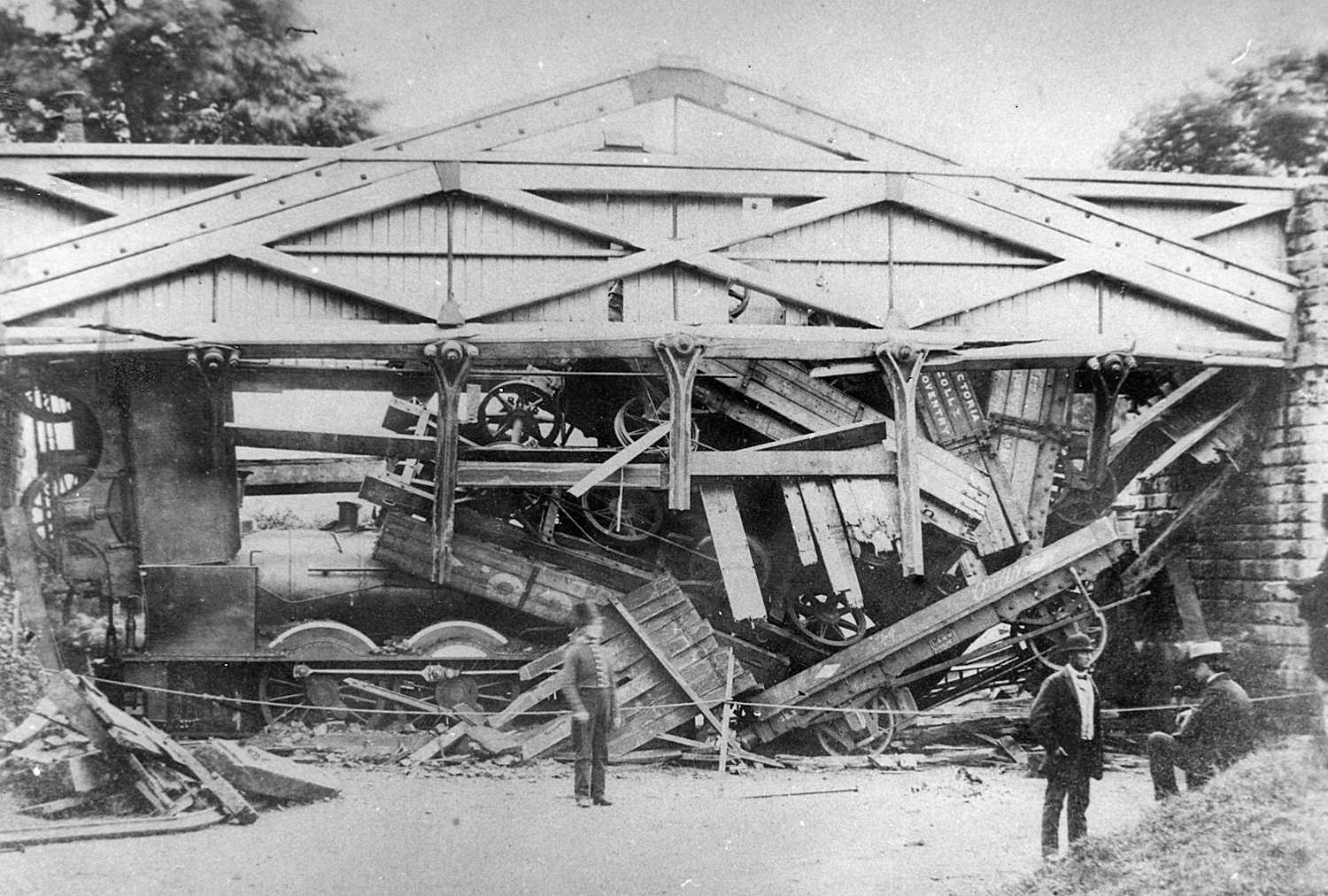

Details
- Date: 11 June 1861; ~07:15
- Location: Leek Wootton, Warwickshire
- Country: England
- Line: Coventry to Leamington Line
- Operator: London & North Western Railway
- Cause: Bridge failure

Statistics
- Trains: 1
- Passengers: 0
- Deaths: 2

The Wootton bridge collapse occurred on 11 June 1861, when the rail bridge over the road between Leek Wootton and Hill Wootton in Warwickshire collapsed under the weight of a passing goods train on the line between Leamington Spa and Kenilworth owned by the London and North Western Railway Company. The train had passed over the bridge safely in the morning with a full load of coal, and was returning to Kenilworth with the empty wagons at 7 am. The 30 ton locomotive fell through the deck of the bridge onto the road below, and the tender crashed into the cab, killing driver and fireman instantly. Many of the empty wagons behind were dragged into the gap to form a pile almost up to the height of nearby telegraph poles.

== Investigation ==
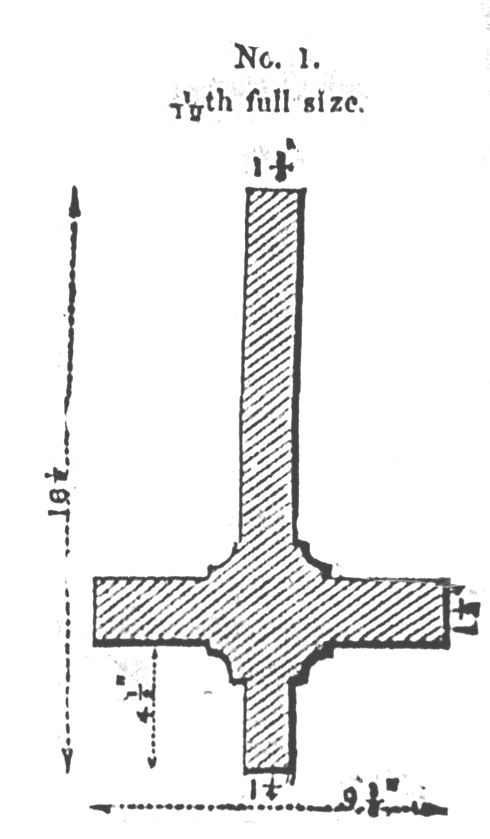
Original section of cast iron girder

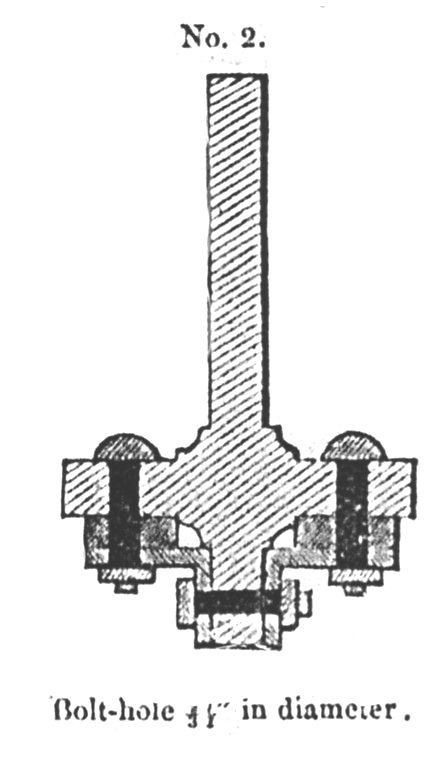
Mended cast iron girder after cracking

Henry Whatley Tyler of the Railway Inspectorate examined the accident on behalf of the Board of Trade. He reported that the five cast iron girders which supported the base of the wooden bridge had all fractured near their centres, and so caused the accident. One in particular had been mended some years before, and he thought that the failure had started here. Angle iron had been fitted along the girder to support a crack in the flange, and had been bolted onto the cast iron. Far from strengthening the girder it had actually weakened it further. In hindsight, it is likely that cracks in the girders had grown to a critical size during the initial passage of the heavy train, which then gave way when the empty train returned.

== Similar accidents ==
It is memorable for coming after the Dee bridge disaster of 1847, when another cast iron bridge had failed. Cast iron should not have been used in this safety-critical application, and the design seems very strange, using cast iron where timber baulks would have sufficed. The bridge had been built in 1844, well before the Dee accident, and patched with the angle iron in 1853. The discovery of the cracked girder should have alerted engineers to the problem, and all should have been replaced entirely. Cast iron failures remained a problem for many years, culminating in the fall of the Tay Rail Bridge in December, 1879 with over 75 casualties in the passenger express passing over the viaduct at the time the cast iron columns collapsed. The problem did not end there, however, because so much cast iron had been used on the rail network. A cast iron under-bridge failed suddenly under a train during the Inverythan crash in 1882, killing five passengers on the train. The event which really focused minds occurred in 1891, when another girder failed under the Brighton express. Although no-one was killed, the furore caused by the Norwood Junction rail accident led to a survey of all under-bridges. Several thousand were eventually found, and ultimately strengthened or replaced.
