= James Marshall Moorsom =

British politician

Member of Parliament for Great Yarmouth
- In office 1892–1895
- Preceded by: Sir Henry Tyler
- Succeeded by: Sir John Colomb

Personal details
- Born: 16 November 1837
- Died: 26 March 1918 (aged 80)
- Party: Liberal
- Spouse: Emma Catherine Browne
- Parent: Vice-Admiral Constantine Moorsom (father)
- Relatives: Admiral Robert Moorsom (paternal grandfather); Robin Benson (nephew); William Moorsom (uncle); Henry Longueville Mansel (cousin); Toby Young (great grandson)

James Marshall Moorsom (16 November 1837 – 26 March 1918) was a British Liberal Party politician.

Son of Vice-Admiral Constantine Moorsom and grandson of Admiral Robert Moorsom, who distinguished himself at the Battle of Trafalgar, he was elected at the 1892 general election as the Member of Parliament (MP) for Great Yarmouth in Norfolk, defeating the sitting Conservative MP Sir Henry Whatley Tyler.

Moorsom served only three years in the House of Commons, until his defeat at the 1895 general election.

Moorsom was father of Raisley Stewart Moorsom, whose daughter Sasha married the sociologist Michael Young, Baron Young of Dartington; their son is the journalist Toby Young.

Parliament of the United Kingdom
| Preceded by Sir Henry Tyler | Member of Parliament for Great Yarmouth; 1892–1895 | Succeeded by Sir John Colomb |
