= Dee Bridge disaster =

1847 railway accident in England

Dee bridge disaster
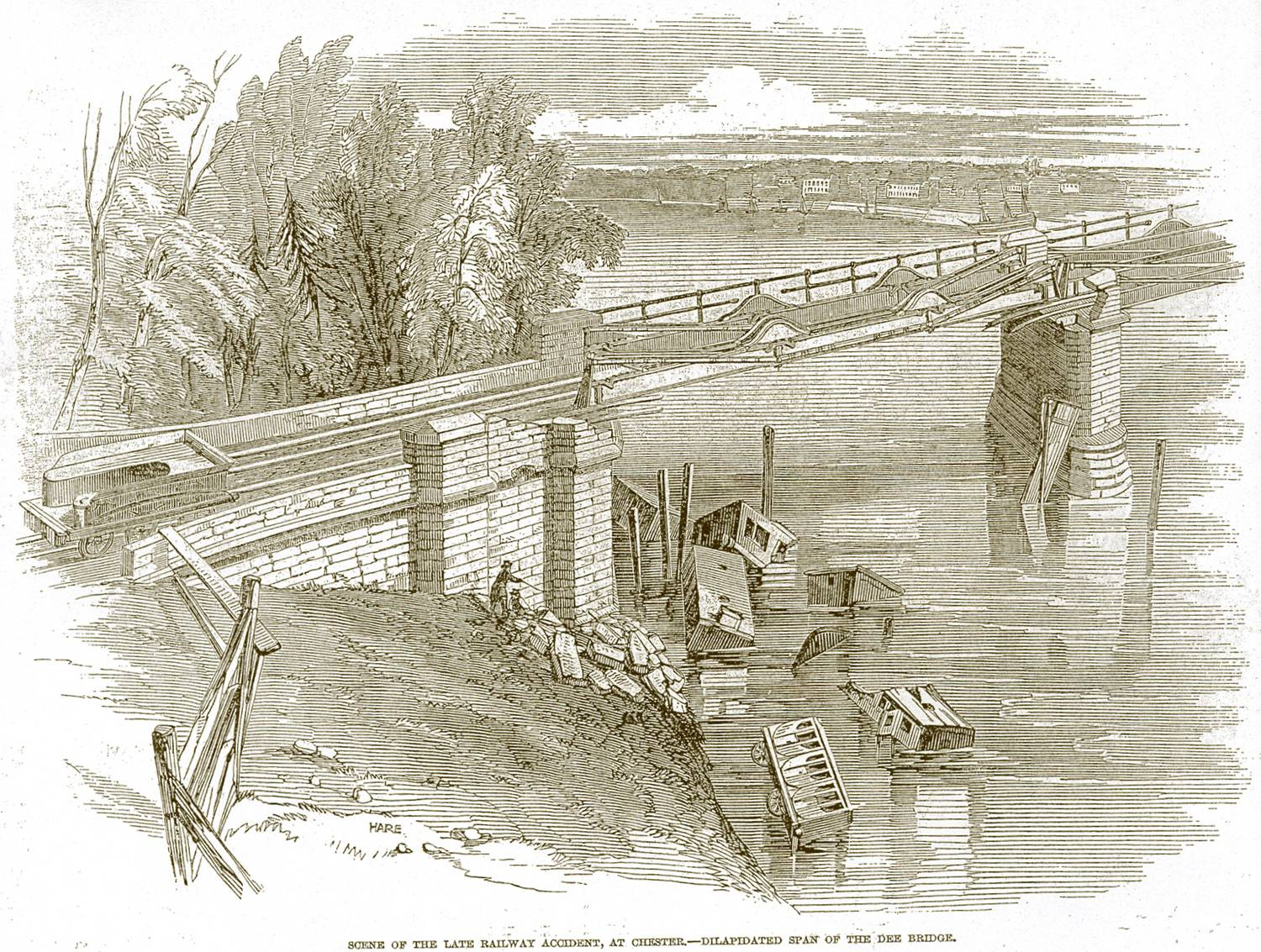

Details
- Date: 24 May 1847; ~18:25
- Location: Chester, Cheshire
- Coordinates: 53.1865°N 2.9047°W
- Country: England
- Line: North Wales Coast Line and Shrewsbury–Chester line
- Cause: Bridge fail

Statistics
- Trains: 1
- Passengers: 22
- Deaths: 5
- Injured: 9

The Dee Bridge disaster was a rail accident that occurred on 24 May 1847 in Chester, England, that resulted in five fatalities. It revealed the weakness of cast iron beam bridges reinforced by wrought iron tie bars, and brought criticism of its designer, Robert Stephenson, the son of George Stephenson.

== Background ==
A new bridge across the River Dee was needed for the Chester and Holyhead Railway, a project planned in the 1840s for the expanding British railway system. It was built using cast iron girders produced by the Horseley Ironworks, each of which was made of three large castings dovetailed together and bolted to a raised reinforcing piece. Each girder was strengthened by wrought iron bars along the length. It was finished in September 1846, and opened for local traffic after approval by the first Railway Inspector, General Charles Pasley.

== Accident ==
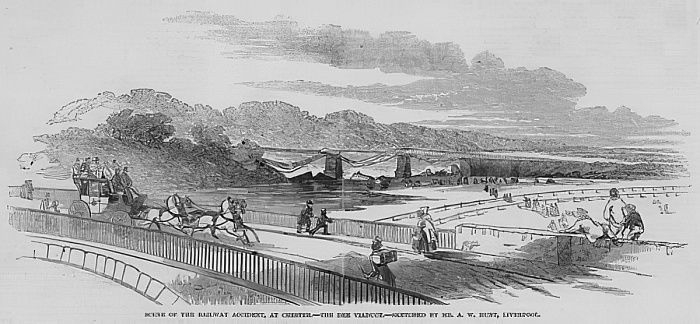
Scene of the Railway Accident, at Chester, sketched by a 16 year old, Alfred William Hunt, and printed in The Illustrated London News of 29 May 1847

On 24 May 1847, the carriages of a local passenger train to Ruabon fell through the bridge into the river. The accident resulted in five deaths (three passengers, the train guard and the locomotive fireman) and nine serious injuries.

The bridge had been designed by Robert Stephenson, and a local inquest accused him of negligence. Although strong in compression, cast iron was known to be brittle in tension or bending, yet the bridge deck was covered with track ballast on the day of the accident, to prevent the oak beams supporting the track from catching fire. Stephenson took that precaution because of a recent fire on the Great Western Railway at Hanwell, in which a bridge designed by Isambard Kingdom Brunel had caught fire and collapsed.

== Investigation ==
The investigation was one of the first major inquiries conducted by the newly formed Railway Inspectorate. The lead investigator was Captain Simmons of the Royal Engineers, and his report suggested that repeated flexing of the girder weakened it substantially. He examined the broken parts of the main girder, and confirmed that it had broken in two places, with the first break occurring at the centre. He tested the remaining girders by driving a locomotive across them, and found that they deflected by several inches under the moving load. His conclusion was that the design was basically flawed, and that the wrought iron trusses fixed to the girders did not reinforce the girders at all. The same conclusion was reached by the jury at the inquest. Stephenson's design had depended on the wrought iron trusses to strengthen the final structures, but they were anchored on the cast iron girders themselves, and so deformed with any strain on the bridge.

Stephenson maintained that the locomotive derailed whilst crossing the bridge, and the impact force against the girder caused it to fracture. However, eyewitnesses said that they saw the girder break first, and that the locomotive and tender were still on the track at the far side of the bridge. Indeed, the driver raced on to the next station to warn of the accident and prevent any traffic using the line. He then came back on the other side and drove to Chester where he gave a similar warning.

== Royal Commission ==
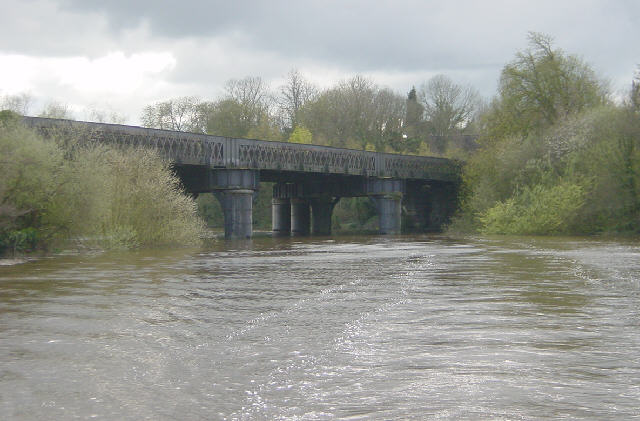
Modern railway bridge in Chester, spanning the river between Curzon Park and the Roodee. Photo taken at high tide.

A subsequent Royal Commission (which reported in 1849) condemned the design and the use of trussed cast iron in railway bridges, but there were other failures of cast-iron railway underbridges in subsequent years, such as the Wootton bridge collapse and the Bull bridge accident. Similar failures occurred in the Inverythan crash and the Norwood Junction crash. All the structures used untrussed cast iron girders, and generally failed due to blowholes or other casting defects within the bulk material, which were often completely hidden from external view.

The Norwood accident in 1891 led to a review of all similar structures by Sir John Fowler, who recommended their replacement. Cast iron had been used very successfully in the Crystal Palace of 1851 and the Crumlin Viaduct in South Wales (built in 1857), but the first Tay Rail Bridge of 1878 failed catastrophically due to its poor use of the material, putting the cast iron lugs on the columns into tension. The Tay Bridge disaster stimulated engineers to use steel, as exemplified by the Forth Bridge of 1890.

The Dee bridge was later rebuilt using wrought iron.

== See also ==
- List of bridge disasters
- List of structural failures and collapses
- Structural engineering
- Structural failure
