= Jonathan Scarth =

British industrialist (1772-1850)

- Born: 18 February 1772; Whitby, Yorkshire, England
- Died: 14 December 1850 (aged 78); Shropshire, England
- Occupation: Cotton mill owner
- Partner: Frances Richardson
- Relatives: Robert Moorsom (brother-in-law); Constantine Richard Moorsom; Sir Frederick William Frankland; Timothy Laurence

Jonathan Scarth (18 February 1772 – 14 December 1850) was a partner in one of Manchester's early steam powered cotton mills in the late 18th century, and was an entrepreneur of the English Industrial Revolution.

== Life ==
Jonathan Scarth was born in Whitby, Yorkshire, England, the son of Thomas Scarth, a Quaker ship owner. (His father did not remain a Quaker however, having been disowned by the society in 1781 for refusing to sail his ships without guns for protection). With funds from his father Thomas and brother-in-law Robert Moorsom, Jonathan, Richard Percival Moulson and Robert Owen (later to become the "father of English socialism") formed the Chorlton Twist Company to set up a state of the art steam powered cotton mill at Chorlton near Manchester.

The partners bought a Boulton and Watt rotary steam engine for £1,492 from James Watt in 1796. The 31-inch cylinder was cast and bored by John Wilkinson, and the machine weighed 99,000 pounds. James Watt Jr. wrote to Robert Owen that it was "one of the most perfect that ever passed through our hands". Robert Owen's description of Jonathan and his partner Richard was less flattering: "two young men, inexperienced in the business, although they had capital".

Trouble started in 1796 just as the factory was starting production. The fear of French invasion caused an international credit squeeze. Creditors could not borrow funds to pay. In January 1798 Moulson left the company, and in August of the same year Jonathan Scarth and another partner Matthew Chitty Marshall followed suit. Undeterred, he and Marshall, with Benjamin Naylor, James Byfield and Theodore Rupp set up another cotton spinning company, "Scarth Marshall Rupp and Co." That company purchased a slightly smaller steam engine from Boulton and Watt, however it wound up in August 1801. In late 1807 Jonathan was declared bankrupt.

=== Later life ===
After the birth of his second daughter Frances in Manchester in 1808, Jonathan, then 36 years old, and his family moved to County Cork in Ireland. He and his wife Frances had a total of ten children, including a son Robert Moorsom Scarth, named after Jonathan's brother-in-law. Jonathan recovered financially to the point that he was living on "independent means" at the time of his death in Shropshire on 14 December 1850.

== Bibliography ==
- Allen, Richard C. Remember me to my good friend Captain Walker: James Cook and the North Yorkshire Quakers. In Williams, Glyndwr (editor). "Captain Cook: Explorations And Reassessments". The Boydell Press, Woodbridge, Suffolk, UK. 2004. ISBN 1 84383 100 7
- Chaloner, William Henry. Robert Owen, Peter Drinkwater and the Early Factory System in Manchester, 1788-1800. Essay in "Bulletin of the John Rylands Library", September 1954. Pages 78–102.
- Charlton, Lionel. The history of Whitby, and of Whitby abbey. A. Ward, 1779.
- Nason, Elias. "Sir Charles Henry Frankland, baronet: or, Boston in the colonial times" J. Munsell, 1865.
- Young, George (Rev.). A History of Whitby, and Streoneshalh Abbey. Vol. 2 Clark and Medd. 1817.
