= Collomb =

Collomb is a surname. Notable people with the surname include:

- Bernard Collomb (1930–2011), French Formula One driver
- Bertrand P. Collomb (1942–2019), French business executive
- Francisque Collomb (1910–2009), French politician
- Gérard Collomb (1947–2023), French politician
- Henri Collomb (1913–1979), French psychiatrist
- Jonathan Collomb-Patton (born 1979), French snowboarder
- Paul Collomb (1921–2010), French painter and lithographer
- Théo Collomb (born 2000), French footballer
- Aurélie Perrillat-Collomb Storti (born 1980), French cross-country skier
- Christophe Perrillat-Collomb (born 1979), French cross-country skier

== See also ==
- Collom
- Colomb
