= 97th (The Earl of Ulster's) Regiment of Foot =

97th or Earl of Ulsters Regiment of Foot
- Active: 1824–1881
- Country: United Kingdom
- Branch: British Army
- Type: Infantry
- Nickname: The Celestials
- Mottos: Quo Fas et Gloria Ducunt – Where Right and Glory Lead
- Colors: Sky blue facings
- March: Quick March "Paddy’s Resource"
- Anniversaries: Sevastopol Day (8 September)
- Engagements: Crimean War; Indian Mutiny

The 97th (The Earl of Ulster's) Regiment of Foot was an infantry regiment of the British Army, formed in 1824 and amalgamated into the Queen's Own (Royal West Kent Regiment) in 1881.

== History ==
=== Raising ===
In 1823 and 1824 the size of the British Army was increased by the raising of six regiments of foot, numbered the 94th-99th. The raising of the 97th Regiment was authorised by a royal warrant dated 25 March 1824: the colonelcy was given to Major General Sir James Lyon, with the headquarters to be established at Gosport. It was the sixth regiment of foot to have borne the number "97", the others having been short-lived war-raised units that existed at various periods during the Seven Years' War, the American Revolutionary War and the French Revolutionary and Napoleonic Wars. On 30 March the headquarters of the regiment were moved to Winchester, by which time recruiting parties were active throughout the United Kingdom. By June 1824 the regiment had been brought up to full strength.

=== "Earl of Ulster's" ===
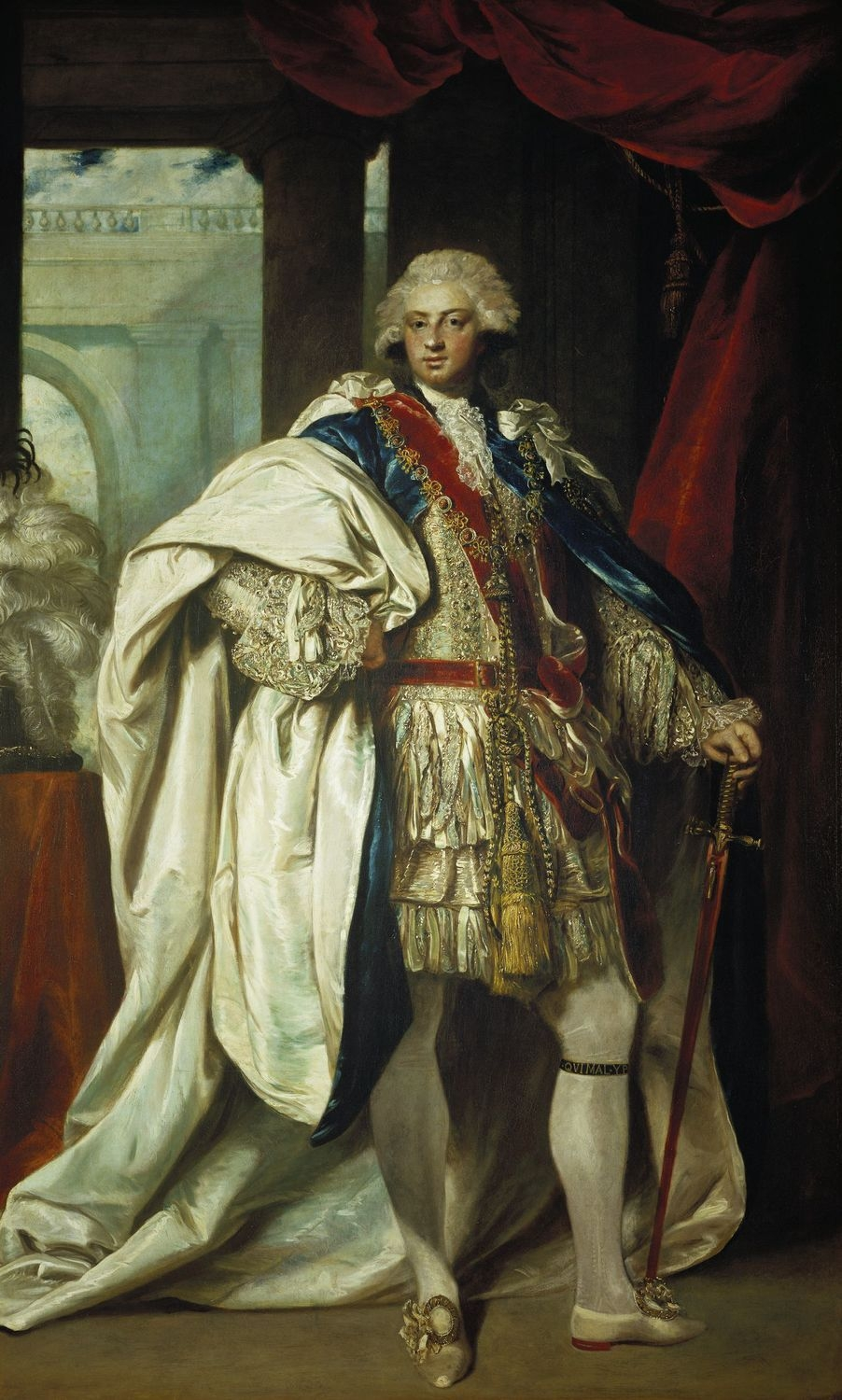
Prince Frederick, Earl of Ulster

The bulk of the regiment was recruited in Ireland, and it was initially regarded as an Irish unit. This led to it being given sky blue facings derived from the colour of the ribbon of the Order of St Patrick. The colour of the facings led to the 97th gaining the nickname The Celestials. The Irish connection was reinforced in September 1826 when the regiment was granted the additional title of "Earl of Ulster's". This was an additional title in the Peerage of Ireland borne by Prince Frederick, Duke of York and Albany. The Latin motto Quo fas et gloria ducunt was granted to the regiment in the following month.

=== Service to 1854 ===
Soon after its formation the 97th Foot was ordered to Ceylon to relieve the 45th (Nottinghamshire Sherwood Foresters) Regiment of Foot. They arrived in 1825, and were to spend 11 years on the island. In November 1832, the regiment's cricket team played the Colombo Cricket Club at the Rifle Green in Colombo, in the first recorded cricket match in Ceylon (Sri Lanka).

The regiment returned to the United Kingdom in 1836, arriving at Portsmouth aboard HMS Jupiter in September. From 1836 to 1841 the regiment was stationed at various garrisons in England and Ireland.

In 1841 the regiment sailed from Cork for the Ionian Islands, and was stationed at Corfu until 1847. They moved to Malta in 1847 before departing for Halifax, Nova Scotia in the following year, relieving the 23rd (Royal Welch Fusiliers) Regiment of Foot. The regiment returned to England in May 1853. By March 1854 it seemed inevitable that war would break out with the Russian Empire, and the 97th Foot were ordered to "hold themselves in readiness" to proceed to the Crimea. The regiment formed part of an expeditionary force that left Southampton in May 1854. They found themselves diverted to Greece, where they formed part of an Anglo-French occupation force suppressing the Uprising in Epirus. In November 1854 they were selected as one of six infantry battalions to form reinforcements for the forces in the Crimea.

=== Crimean War ===
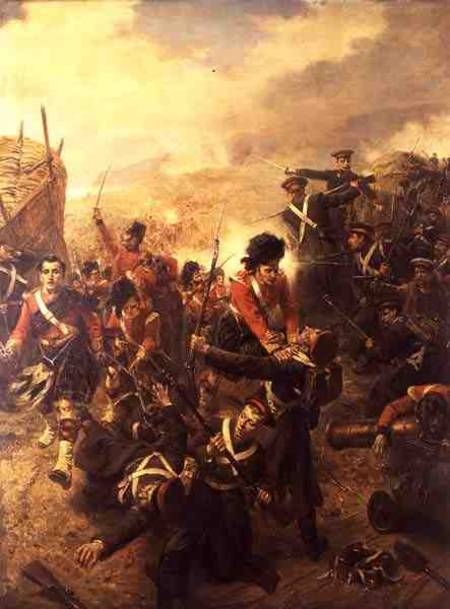
The Attack on the Redan by Robert Alexander Hillingford

The 97th Foot landed at Balaklava on 20 November 1854. They took part in the Siege of Sevastopol and the Battle of the Great Redan. It was on 22 March 1855, during the Siege of Sevastopol, that Captain Hedley Vicars of the 97th lost his life. Vicars was mentioned in despatches on 6 April by Lord Raglan, and was the subject of a posthumous book. The regiment suffered heavy casualties, with two members subsequently being awarded the newly created Victoria Cross in 1857:

- Sergeant John Coleman for actions at Sevastopol on 30 August 1855.
- Brevet Major Charles Henry Lumley for actions at the Redan on 8 September 1855.

Following the end of the war, the 97th Regiment returned to England, arriving in July 1856.

=== Indian Mutiny ===
The 97th Foot's time in England was to be short: in May 1857 a rebellion broke out among native soldiers of the East India Company. In July it was announced that the 97th were among six infantry battalions to be sent to India as reinforcements. The regiment arrived in Bombay in November 1857. In April 1858 they joined the British forces that lifted the Siege of Lucknow. The regiment subsequently took part in minor operations at Fort Nusrutpore, Chanda, Umeerpore and Sultanpore before the ending of the conflict in June 1858.

=== Garrison duty to 1881 ===
The 97th remained in India until 1867. They returned to the United Kingdom, spending six years at various stations in England and Ireland. In May 1873 the regiment sailed from Queenstown for the West Indies. They were stationed in Jamaica from 1873 to 1875 and in Bermuda from 1875 to 1877.

=== Amalgamation ===
Between 1868 and 1874 there was a major reorganisation of the line infantry. All single-battalion regiments of foot were to be paired, sharing a permanent depot and a geographical recruiting area. One battalion was to be on "foreign" and one on "home" service at any time. It was originally proposed that the 97th be paired with the 103rd Regiment of Foot (Royal Bombay Fusiliers) with a depot at Guildford in Surrey. This proved controversial, the 97th Foot still being regarded as an Irish regiment with no connection to England.

In March 1872 the pairing was changed, when the 97th was linked with the 50th (Queen's Own) Regiment of Foot. This ended the 97th's Irish connection, as it and the 50th were to share barracks at Maidstone Barracks, in Kent (District no. 46).

On 1 August 1881, under the Childers Reforms, the 97th and 50th Regiments of Foot were merged as, respectively, the 2nd and 1st Battalions, Queen's Own (Royal West Kent Regiment).

After further amalgamations in 1961, 1966 and 1992, the lineage of the 97th Regiment was continued by the Princess of Wales's Royal Regiment.

== Battle Honours ==
Battle honours won by the regiment were:

- Crimean War: Sevastopol
- Indian Rebellion of 1857: Lucknow

== Victoria Crosses ==
- Sergeant John Coleman, Crimean War (30 August 1855)
- Captain Charles Lumley, Crimean War (8 September 1855)

== Colonels of the Regiment ==
Colonels of the Regiment were:

- 1824–1829: Lt-Gen. Sir James Frederick Lyon, KCB, GCH
- 1829–1833: Lt-Gen. Hon. Sir Robert William O'Callaghan, GCB
- 1833–1843: F.M. Sir Henry Hardinge, 1st Viscount Hardinge, GCB
- 1843: Lt-Gen. Sir Charles James Napier, GCB
- 1843–1852: Lt-Gen. Sir Henry Frederick Bouverie, GCB, GCMG
- 1852–1859: Lt-Gen. Henry Adolphus Proctor, CB
- 1859–1861: Gen. Sir Edward Finucane Morris, KCB
- 1861–1869: Lt-Gen. John Campbell
- 1869–1874: Gen. George Thomas Colomb
- 1874–1881: Gen. John Maxwell Perceval, CB
