= Collom =

Collom is a surname. Notable people with the surname include:

- Jack Collom (1931–2017), American poet and essayist
- Rose E. Collom (1870–1956), American botanist and plant collector

== See also ==
- Collomb
