= Charles Lumley =

Charles Henry Lumley
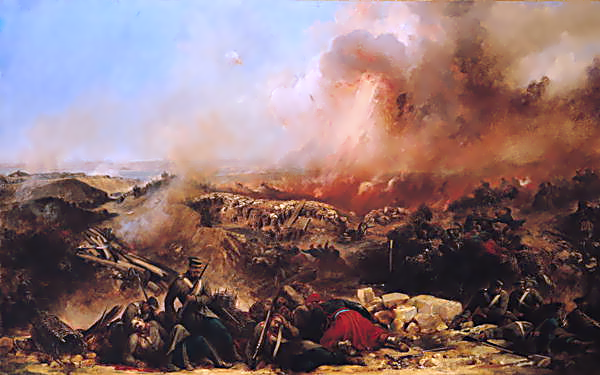
- Depiction of the Siege of Sebastopol
- Born: 1824; Forres, Morayshire
- Died: 17 October 1858 (aged 33–34); Brecknock, Powys
- Burial place: Brecon Cathedral Churchyard, Powys
- Military career
- Allegiance: United Kingdom
- Branch: British Army
- Rank: Major
- Units: 97th Regiment of Foot
- Conflicts: Crimean War
- Awards: Victoria Cross; Légion d'honneur (France); Order of the Medjidie (Ottoman Empire)

Charles Henry Lumley VC (1824 – 17 October 1858) was a Scottish recipient of the Victoria Cross, the highest and most prestigious award for gallantry in the face of the enemy that can be awarded to British and Commonwealth forces.

== Details ==
Lumley was about 31 years old, and a captain in the 97th Regiment of Foot (later The Queen's Own Royal West Kent Regiment) of the British Army during the Crimean War when the following deed took place for which he was awarded the VC.

On 8 September 1855 at Sebastopol, in the Crimea at the assault on the Redan, Captain Lumley was among the first inside the work, where he was immediately attacked by three Russian gunners who were reloading a field piece. He shot two of them with his revolver when he was knocked down by a stone which stunned him for a moment, but on recovery, he drew his sword and was in the act of cheering his men on, when he was severely wounded in the mouth.

== Further information ==
He was born in Forres, Morayshire, Scotland. He later achieved the rank of major and is buried in the churchyard at Brecon Cathedral.

== The medal ==
His Victoria Cross is displayed at The Queen's Own Royal West Kent Regiment Museum in Maidstone, Kent, England.
