= PS Admiral Moorsom =

Passenger steamboat

History
- Name: PS Admiral Moorsom
- Namesake: Admiral Robert Moorsom (1760–1835), Royal Navy officer
- Owner: London and North Western Railway
- Operator: London and North Western Railway
- Port of registry: (United Kingdom)
- Route: Holyhead, Wales – Dublin, Ireland
- Builder: Barclay Curle, Glasgow, Scotland
- Yard number: 83
- Launched: September 1860
- Fate: Sunk in collision 15 January 1885

General characteristics
- Tonnage: 794 gross register tons (GRT)
- Length: 219.3 ft (66.8 m)
- Beam: 30.2 ft (9.2 m)
- Draught: 15.1 ft (4.6 m)

PS Admiral Moorsom was a passenger paddle steamer operated by the London and North Western Railway (LNWR) from 1860 to 1885.

== History ==
Admiral Moorsom was built by Barclay Curle of Glasgow, Scotland, and launched in 1860. She may have been named after Vice-Admiral Constantine Moorsom, who was the LNWR director responsible for steamships, or after his father Admiral Sir Robert Moorsom (1760–1835), an officer of the Royal Navy who served in the Battle of Trafalgar in 1805.

On 15 November 1862, she collided with RMS Ulster in the Irish Sea off Holyhead, Anglesey and was severely damaged. RMS Ulster towed her in to Holyhead. She was run into by the American sailing ship Santa Clara in the Irish Sea off Arklow, County Wicklow, on 15 January 1885 and sank. Twenty-five people were rescued by Santa Clara and five by the steamship Falcon, but five people were lost. Admiral Moorsom was on a voyage from Dublin to Holyhead, Anglesey.
