= Henry Tyler (British politician) =

British engineer and politician (1827-1908)

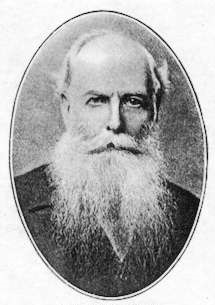
- Born: Henry Whatley Tyler; 7 March 1827; Mayfair, London
- Died: 30 January 1908 (aged 80)

Sir Henry Whatley Tyler (7 March 1827 – 30 January 1908) was a British engineer and politician, who contributed to the Great Exhibition of 1851 and whose collections helped found the Science Museum in South Kensington. His interests were mainly in railways, where he served Inspector of Railways and a railway company director but also in water and iron working. He was also a Conservative politician who sat in the House of Commons from 1880 to 1892.

== Early life ==
Tyler was born in Mayfair, London, the son of John Chatfield Tyler and attended the Royal Military Academy Woolwich. He received a commission as a Second Lieutenant in the Royal Engineers on 19 December 1844, having previously been a Gentleman Cadet; he was promoted to First Lieutenant on 1 April 1846; and to Second Captain on 31 March 1854. In 1851 he was a lieutenant called upon by Henry Cole to assist with the organisation of the Great Exhibition. In 1860 he donated a set of prospectuses to the State Library of Victoria.

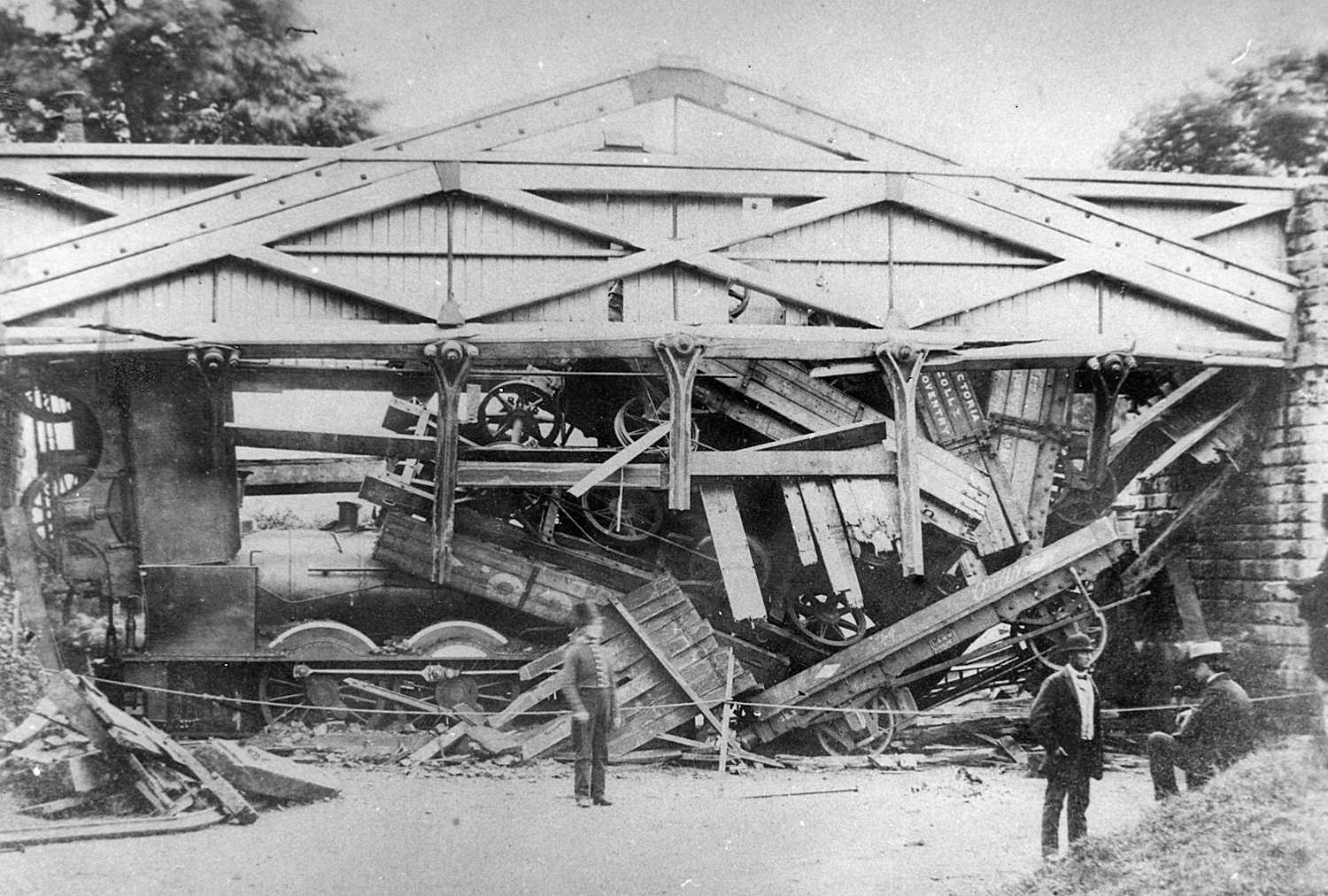
Wootton bridge after the crash

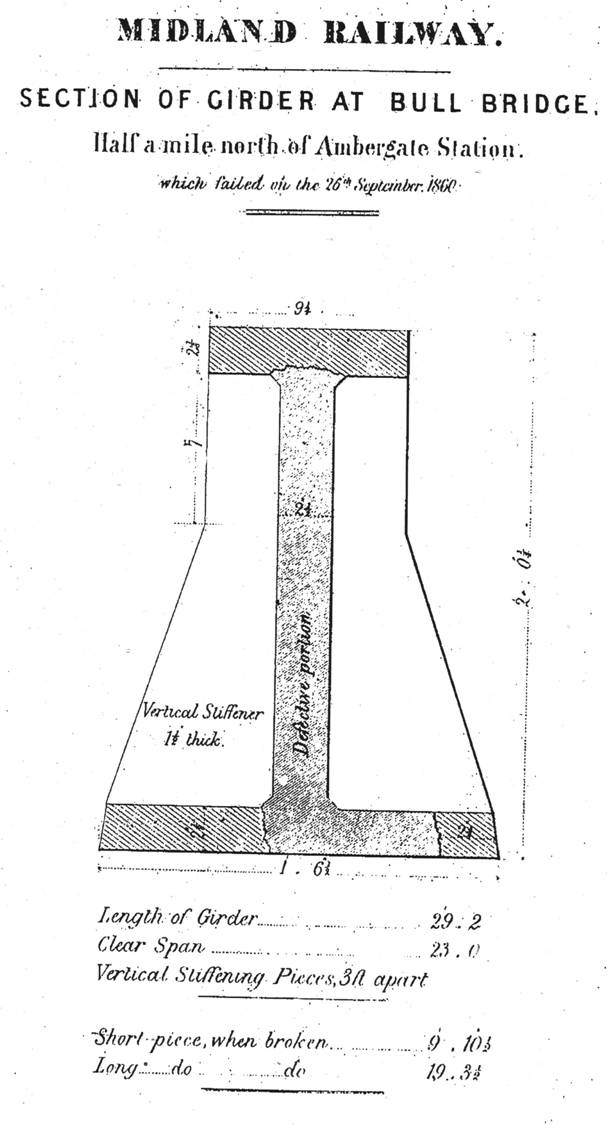
Section of broken girder

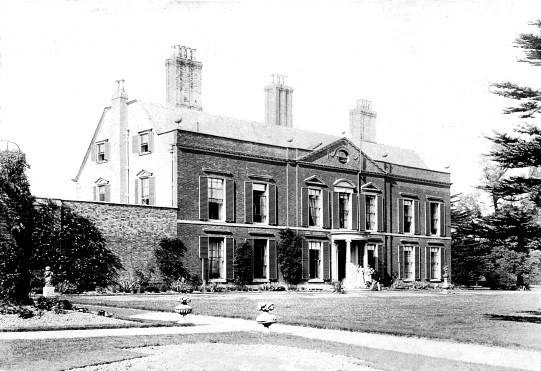
Pymmes House, Tyler's home in the late 19th century.

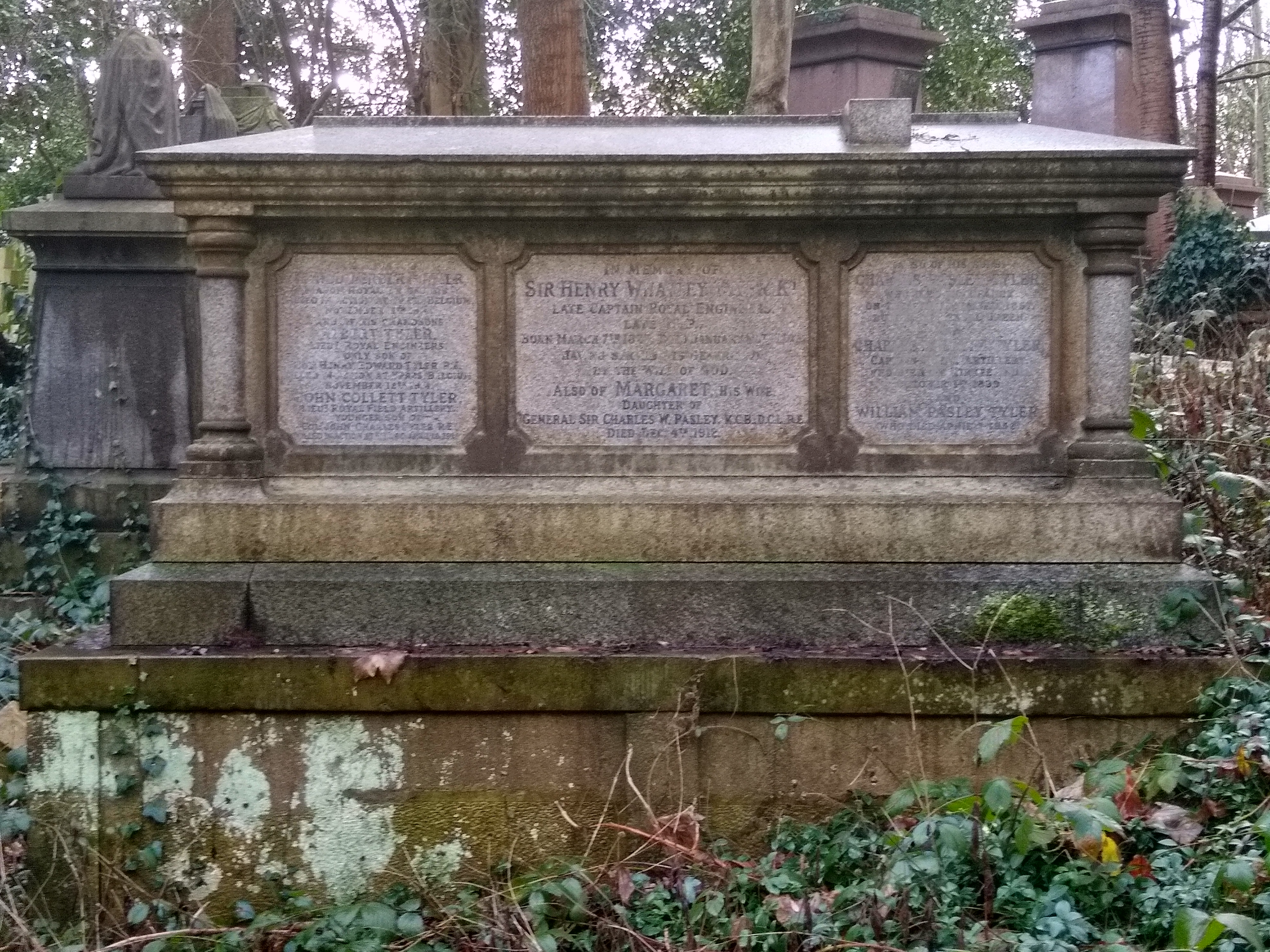
The Tyler family vault in Highgate Cemetery (west)

== Railway Inspectorate ==
Tyler was appointed an Inspecting Officer for Railways in 1853—a function which is normally carried out by Royal Engineers officers—holding the position for 24 years. A typical investigation is reported in the press in 1858. Other important investigations included the Wootton bridge collapse and the Clayton Tunnel rail crash, both of which occurred in 1861. The former involved failure of cast iron beams supporting the track in a wooden bridge, through which a coal train fell, killing the driver and fireman instantly. The Clayton tunnel crash involved a collision in the tunnel and was the worst rail disaster at the time, killing 24 passengers in the rear coaches. He also reported on the Bull bridge accident when yet another cast iron girder failed suddenly as a train was passing over.

During his career as a Board of Trade inspector, Tyler was an advocate of railway nationalisation. In 1857, Tyler was granted two patents, no. 592 on 28 February 1857 and no. 1472 on 25 May 1857, both being for the invention of "improvements in the permanent way of railways". In February 1866, Tyler was seconded to government service, and he was taken off the strength of the army the following October, his final rank being Captain. His expertise was called upon not only in the UK but also in various locations in Europe. In 1866, he was sent to inspect the railway systems of France and Italy, in order to determine how best to transfer mail destined for India from northern France to the Italian port of Brindisi. On his recommendation the route was accepted.

== Later career ==
In 1867, he investigated London's water supply following an outbreak of cholera, an investigation which involved emptying a reservoir of the East London Waterworks Company next to the river Lea, and tasting the contaminated water. His report helped confirm that cholera was water-borne rather than by the air.

In 1868, he spent two periods of leave building the first railway in Greece from Athens to Piraeus. In 1871, he received promotion to Chief Inspector of Railways, and in 1874 he went to America to inspect the Erie for British investors. He was a member of the abortive Channel Tunnel Commission in 1875 to 1876.

Tyler retired from the Railway Inspectorate in 1877 and was knighted, becoming Sir Henry Tyler. He then became President of the Grand Trunk Railway of Canada where he established a successful working relationship with Sir Joseph Hickson. He was also chairman of the Westinghouse Air Brake Company and Deputy Chairman of the Great Eastern Railway Company.

He was a director of National Mutual Assurance and Globe Insurance Company, chairman of the Rhymney Iron Company, chairman of the Peruvian Bondholders Committee and chairman of the Peruvian Corporation.

== Political life ==
At the 1880 general election, Tyler was elected as Conservative Member of Parliament (MP) for Harwich in Essex. In 1882 he objected to a Theosophist article against which he raised a charge of blasphemy and became embroiled in a conflict with Annie Besant. In 1885 he was elected at Great Yarmouth, but lost the seat at the 1892 election. In 1893 he gave up the presidency of the Grand Trunk Railway Company.

=== Harwich Election Petition Trial (1880) ===
The Harwich election petition trial of 1880 was a landmark legal proceeding concerning allegations of electoral malpractice during the United Kingdom general election that year. The case was brought by the unsuccessful Liberal candidate Colonel George Tomline, who contested the election result in which Conservative candidate Sir Henry Tyler was declared elected Member of Parliament for Harwich.

Harwich had long been a Conservative stronghold, with intermittent Liberal challenges. The borough comprised two parishes: St. Nicholas (the historic town centre) and Dovercourt (a growing seaside suburb). The electorate totalled approximately 765 voters, drawn from a mix of seafarers, railway workers, tradesmen, and rural labourers.

The 1880 general election returned Sir Henry. His opponent alleged the result was secured through corrupt practices.

The petition accused Tyler and his supporters of:

Bribery: Offering employment, forgiving rent or debts, and promising contracts in exchange for votes. Treating: Distributing alcohol to voters at public houses acting as Conservative committee rooms. Undue Influence: Intimidation and coercion by employers and party agents. Illegal Payments: Paying for the conveyance of out-of-town voters to the poll, contrary to electoral law.

Key evidence focused on activity in Dovercourt, where several public houses allegedly supplied free drinks to voters on polling day. Liberal "detectives" were employed to gather testimonies, some of which came from paid informants.

The trial opened in June 1880 at Harwich Town Hall before Justices Montague Lush and Henry Manisty. It drew wide local interest, with ticketed admission and ceremonial receptions for the judges. Edward Chapman, the long-serving Town Clerk of Harwich and a prominent Conservative figure, was the first witness. He confirmed electoral statistics and acknowledged his role in inviting Tyler to stand, though denied any misconduct in his official capacity.

Over several days, dozens of witnesses gave conflicting testimony regarding drinking, promises of employment, and payments to voters. A key issue was whether individuals acting in support of Tyler were his formal "agents" under the law. Parallel scrutiny was given to Colonel Tomline's campaign expenses and the role of the Liberal Reform Club in advising on circumventing election law.

The judges dismissed the petition, ruling that Sir Henry Tyler had been duly elected. The treating and bribery alleged could not be directly linked to his authorised agents. However, they found Colonel Tomline guilty of bribery by his agents, notably his election agent Mr Vulliamy and Mr Whitmore, for unlawfully paying expenses for non-resident voters. The Liberal campaign was also criticised for circulating a misleading advisory circular encouraging legally dubious practices.

The Harwich trial highlighted the complexity of electoral law in the wake of the Ballot Act 1872 and preceding Corrupt Practices legislation. It revealed the blurred lines between partisan enthusiasm and unlawful conduct in Victorian elections. While Tyler retained his seat, the trial was a cautionary tale about the legal and moral hazards of 19th-century campaigning.

The case remains a significant example of election law in practice during the late Victorian period and illustrates the political tensions in small boroughs transitioning from traditional patronage to modern democratic competition.

== Personal life ==
Tyler married Margaret Pasley, daughter of General Sir Charles Pasley, K.C.B. in 1852. Lady Tyler's Terrace in Rhymney is named after her.

He was interested in homeopathy and contributed large sums of money for the expansion of the London Homeopathic Hospital. His daughter, Margaret Lucy Tyler (1875–1943), was a student of James Tyler Kent and became one of the most influential homeopaths of all time

He died at his home, Linden House in Highgate, north London, on 30 January 1908 and is buried in a family vault at Highgate Cemetery.

== See also ==
- Railway Inspectorate

== Bibliography ==
- PR Lewis, Disaster on the Dee: Robert Stephenson's Nemesis of 1847, Tempus Publishing (2007) ISBN 978-0-7524-4266-2

Parliament of the United Kingdom
Preceded by Henry Jervis-White-Jervis	Member of Parliament for Harwich; 1880 – 1885	Succeeded by James Round
Preceded by Constituency disfranchised	Member of Parliament for Great Yarmouth; 1885 – 1892	Succeeded by James Marshall Moorsom
