= The Queen's Own Royal West Kent Regiment Museum =

Coordinates: 51.276094°N 0.520668°E

The Queen's Own Royal West Kent Regiment Museum is the regimental museum of the Queen's Own Royal West Kent Regiment. It is an independent museum located inside the Maidstone Museum & Art Gallery, located in St Faith's Street in Maidstone, England. The museum displays four of the six Victoria Crosses won by members of the regiment (those of John Pennington Harman, John Coleman, Charles Lumley, and Thomas James Harris).
