= Thomas James Harris =

- Born: 30 January 1892; Halling, Kent, England
- Died: 9 August 1918 (aged 26); Morlancourt, France
- Burial place: Dernancourt Communal Cemetery Extension
- Military career
- Allegiance: United Kingdom
- Branch: British Army
- Service years: 1914−1918
- Rank: Sergeant
- Units: Queen's Own Royal West Kent Regiment
- Conflicts: First World War☆
- Awards: Victoria Cross; Military Medal

Sergeant Thomas James Harris VC MM (30 January 1892 – 9 August 1918) was a British Army soldier and an English recipient of the Victoria Cross (VC), the highest and most prestigious award for gallantry in the face of the enemy that can be awarded to British and Commonwealth forces.

Son of William John and Sarah Ann Harris of Rochester He was 26 years old, and a serjeant in the 6th (Service) Battalion, Queen's Own Royal West Kent Regiment, British Army during the First World War. On 9 August 1918 at Morlancourt, France, he performed the deeds for which he was awarded the Victoria Cross.

== Citation ==
No. 358 Sjt. Thomas James Harris, M.M., late R.W. Kent R. (Lower Hailing, Kent).

For most conspicuous bravery and devotion to duty in attack when the advance was much impeded by hostile machine guns concealed in crops and shell-holes. Sjt. Harris led his section against one of these, capturing it and killing seven of the enemy.

Later, on two successive occasions, he attacked single-handed two enemy machine guns which were causing heavy casualties and holding up the advance. He captured the first gun and killed the crew, but was himself killed when attacking the second one.

It was largely due to the great courage and initiative of this gallant N.C.O. that the advance of the battalion was continued without delay and undue casualties. Throughout the operations he showed a total disregard for his own personal safety, and set a magnificent example to all ranks.

— London Gazette

== The medal ==
His VC is displayed at The Queen's Own Royal West Kent Regiment Museum, Maidstone, Kent.

== Bibliography ==
- Gliddon, Gerald (2014) [2002]. Road to Victory 1918. VCs of the First World War. The History Press. ISBN 978-0750953610.
- Ingleton, Roy (2011). Kent VCs. Pen and Sword Books. ISBN 978-1848844094.
