= John Coleman (VC) =

English Victoria Cross recipient (1821–1858)

John Coleman VC
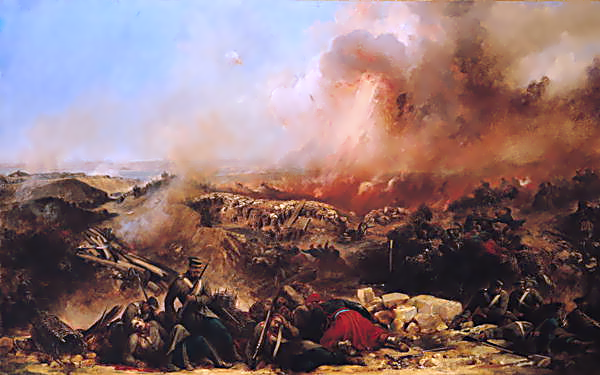
- Depiction of the Siege of Sebastopol
- Born: c. 1821; Norwich, Norfolk
- Died: 22 May 1858; Lucknow, British India
- Military career
- Allegiance: United Kingdom
- Branch: British Army
- Rank: Sergeant
- Units: 97th Regiment of Foot
- Conflicts: Crimean War; Indian Mutiny
- Awards: Victoria Cross

John Coleman VC (c. 1821 – 22 May 1858) was an English recipient of the Victoria Cross, the highest and most prestigious award for gallantry in the face of the enemy that can be awarded to British and Commonwealth forces. He was a native of Norwich.

== Details ==
He was 34 years old, and a Corporal in the 97th (The Earl of Ulster's) Regiment of Foot (later The Queen's Own Royal West Kent Regiment), British Army during the Crimean War when the following deed took place for which he was awarded the VC. He had been promoted to Sergeant by the time of the award.

On 30 August 1855 at Sebastopol, the Crimean Peninsula, when the enemy attacked "New Sap" and drove the working party in, Sergeant Coleman remained in the open, exposed to the enemy's rifle pits until all around him had been killed or wounded. He finally carried one of his officers who was mortally wounded, to the rear.

He died of fever at Lucknow, India, on 22 May 1858.

His Victoria Cross is displayed at The Queen's Own Royal West Kent Regiment Museum in Maidstone, Kent, England.

== Death announcements ==
Norfolk News 24 July 1858:

"On 22nd of May last, at Lucknow of fever, in his 38th year, Serjeant John Coleman VC of her Majesty's 97th Regiment of Foot, in which regiment he served upwards of 20 years, much respected, in the 38th year of his age. The deceased was a native of Norwich."

Norfolk Chronicle and Norwich Gazette 24 July 1858 :

"On 22nd of May, at Lucknow of fever, Serjeant John Coleman VC of her Majesty's 97th Regiment of Foot, upwards of 20 years in the above regiment, in the 38th year of his age. He was a native of this city. "
