= Henri Collomb =

French psychiatrist

Henri Collomb (Valjouffrey, 14 December 1913 – Nice, 9 October 1979) was a French psychiatrist, physician and neurologist, one of the pioneers of twentieth-century ethnopsychiatry. Passionate about mountaineering and air travel, he moved first to Djibouti, then Ethiopia and the Far East, in the role of military doctor.

In 1958 he went to Dakar, where he served as the first Chair of Psychiatry at the University of Dakar and spent twenty years restructuring the colonial mental asylum of Fann. In 1979, he returned to Nice, trying to found a therapeutic community on the line of those created in Africa.
