= Lewis Moorsom =

English cricketer and civil engineer

Lewis Henry Moorsom (c. 1835 – 10 March 1914) was an English cricketer active from 1865 to 1869 who played for Lancashire and Trinidad. He was born in London and died in Bournemouth. He appeared in three first-class matches and scored 41 runs with a highest score of 15. Like his father, William Moorsom (1804–1863), Lewis was a civil engineer. He was a Surveyor-General of Trinidad and Hong Kong.
