= John Colomb =

British politician (1838–1909)

Sir John Colomb KCMG DL JP
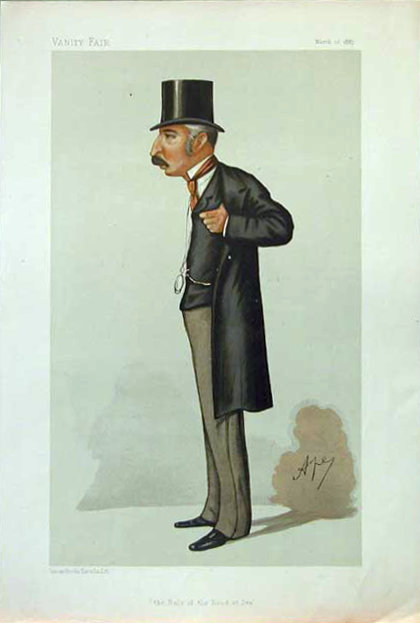
- "The Rule of the Road at Sea". Caricature by Ape published in Vanity Fair in 1887.

Member of Parliament for Bow and Bromley
- In office 1886–1892
- Preceded by: William Robson
- Succeeded by: John Macdonald

Member of Parliament for Great Yarmouth
- In office 1895–1906
- Preceded by: James Marshall Moorsom
- Succeeded by: Arthur Fell

Personal details
- Born: 1 May 1838 Onchan, Isle of Man, United Kingdom
- Died: 27 May 1909 (aged 71) London, England
- Party: Conservative
- Spouse: Emily Anna Palmer (m. 1866)
- Parents: George Thomas Colomb (father); Mary King (mother)
- Relatives: Vice-Admiral Philip Howard Colomb (brother)

Sir John Charles Ready Colomb, KCMG (1 May 1838 – 27 May 1909) was a British naval strategist and politician.

== Life ==
Colomb was born in Onchan, Isle of Man, the son of General George Thomas Colomb, and was the younger brother of British Vice-Admiral Philip Howard Colomb. He was educated privately, and entered the Royal Naval College from which he passed out in 1854 into the Royal Marine Artillery. After being variously employed with the Navy, Army, Militia and Volunteers he retired in 1869 with the rank of captain. He thenceforth devoted himself to the study of naval and military problems, on which he had already published some essays.

His books on Colonial Defence and Colonial Opinions (1873), The Defence of Great and Greater Britain (1879), Naval Intelligence and the Protection of Commerce (1881), The Use and the Application of Marine Forces (1883), Imperial Federation: Naval and Military (1887), followed later by other similar works, made him well known among the rising school of Imperialists, and he was elected to parliament in 1886 as Conservative member for Bow and Bromley (1886–1892), and afterwards (1895–1906) for Great Yarmouth. In the 1895-1900 Parliament, he was Chair of the Imperial Federation Defence Committee.

In 1887 he was created CMG, and in 1888 KCMG. Colomb became a member of the Irish privy council in 1903 and in 1906 sat on the Royal Commission dealing with congested districts. He was also a Deputy Lieutenant and a Justice of Peace for the county; and in 1895 served as High Sheriff of Kerry.

== Family ==
Colomb married on 1 January 1866, to Emily Anna, daughter of Robert Samuel Palmer (1802–1891), and widow of Charles Augustus Francis Paget (1832–64), Lieutenant of the Royal Navy and grandson of the first Marquess of Anglesey. They had three children.

== Works ==
- "The Navy and the Colonies" . The Empire and the century. John Murray. 1905. pp. 213–26.

== Notes ==
Parliament of the United Kingdom
Preceded by William Robson	Member of Parliament for Bow and Bromley; 1886 – 1892	Succeeded by John Macdonald
Preceded by James Marshall Moorsom	Member of Parliament for Great Yarmouth; 1895 – 1906	Succeeded by Arthur Fell
