= Philip Howard Colomb =

Scottish naval officer

Vice-Admiral Philip Howard Colomb
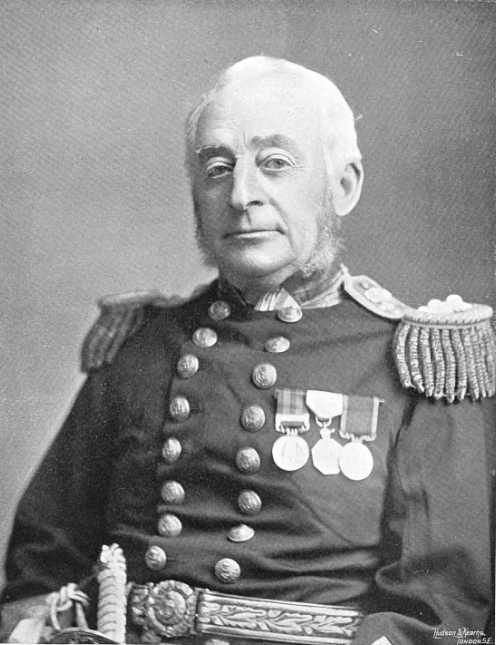
- Colomb in 1898
- Born: 29 May 1831; Knockbrex, Scotland
- Died: 13 October 1899 (aged 68); Botley, Hampshire
- Occupation: Naval officer
- Parents: George Thomas Colomb
- Relatives: Sir John Colomb (brother)
- Military career
- Allegiance: United Kingdom
- Branch: Royal Navy
- Service years: 1846–1886
- Rank: Vice-Admiral
- Commands: HMS Dryad; HMS Audacious; HMS Thunderer
- Conflicts: Second Anglo-Burmese War Crimean War

Vice-Admiral Philip Howard Colomb (29 May 1831 – 13 October 1899). Born in Knockbrex, near Gatehouse of Fleet, Dumfries and Galloway, Scotland, he was a Royal Navy officer, historian, critic and inventor. He was the son of General George Thomas Colomb (1787–1874). His younger brother Sir John Colomb was also a soldier and strategist of the Royal Navy.

== Naval career ==
Colomb entered the navy in 1846, and served first at sea off Portugal in 1847; afterwards, in 1848, in the Mediterranean Sea, and from 1848 to 1851 as midshipman of the Reynard in operations against piracy in Chinese waters; as midshipman and shipmate of the Serpent during the Burmese War of 1852–53; as mate of the Phoenix in the Arctic Expedition of 1854; as lieutenant of the Hastings in the Baltic Sea during the Crimean War, taking part in the attack on Sveaborg.

He became what was known at that time as a gunner's lieutenant in 1857, and from 1859 to 1863 he served as flag-lieutenant to Rear-Admiral Sir Thomas Pasley at Devonport. Between 1858 and 1868 Colomb was employed in home waters on a variety of special services, chiefly connected with gunnery, signalling and the tactical characteristics and capacities of steam warships. From 1868 to 1870 he commanded HMS Dryad in the Persian Gulf region and was engaged in the suppression of the slave trade, particularly around Zanzibar and Oman. His book Slave-catching in the Indian Ocean: A record of naval experiences was published by Longmans in London in 1873, an interesting and informative account, one distinguished by a studied moderation.

In 1874, while captain of HMS Audacious, he served for three years as flag-captain to Vice-Admiral Ryder in China; and finally he was appointed, in 1880, to command HMS Thunderer in the Mediterranean. The next year he was appointed captain of the steam reserve at Portsmouth. After serving three years in that capacity, he remained at Portsmouth as flag-captain to the commander-in-chief until 1886, when he was retired by superannuation before he had attained flag rank. Subsequently, he became rear-admiral, and finally vice-admiral on the retired list.

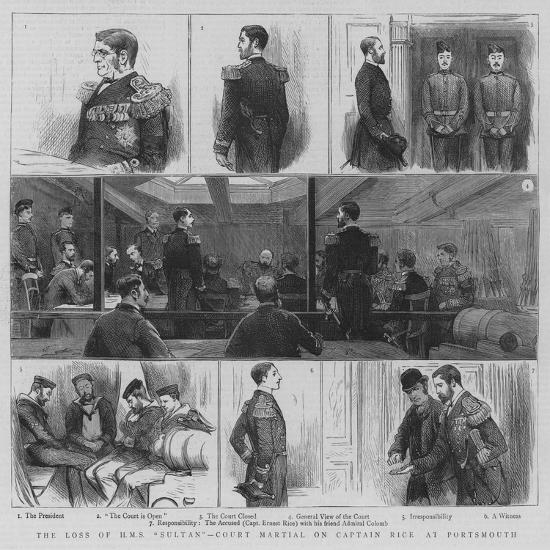
Colomb attended the court martial at Portsmouth of Captain Ernest Rice as his friend, following the loss of HMS Sultan. The Graphic, 1889

== Contributions to naval warfare ==
Colomb saw that the introduction of steam into the navy would necessitate a new system of signals, and new tactics. He set himself to devise the former as far back as 1858. Working with Francis John Bolton, he worked out a Morse code system with signal lamps about 1862. This system of signals was adopted by the navy in 1867.

Colomb moved on to tactics. Having first determined by experiment—for which he was given special facilities by the admiralty—what are the manoeuvring powers of ships propelled by steam under varying conditions of speed and helm, he proceeded to devise a system of tactics based on these data. In the sequel he prepared a new evolutionary signal-book, which was adopted by the Royal Navy. (This was described in 1911 as still "in substance the foundation of the existing system of tactical evolutions at sea".) The same series of experimental studies led him to conclusions concerning the chief causes of collisions at sea; and these conclusions, though stoutly combated in many quarters at the outset, have since been generally accepted, and were ultimately embodied in the international code of regulations adopted by the leading maritime nations on the recommendation of a conference at Washington in 1889.

After his retirement Colomb devoted himself rather to the history of naval warfare, and to the large principles disclosed by its intelligent study, than to experimental inquiries having an immediate practical aim. As in his active career he had wrought organic changes in the ordering, direction and control of fleets, so by his historic studies, pursued after his retirement, he helped greatly to effect, if he did not exclusively initiate, an equally momentous change in the popular, and even the professional, way of regarding sea-power and its conditions.

Colomb did not invent the term "sea-power", as it is of very ancient origin, nor did he employ it until Captain Mahan of the United States Navy had made it a household word with all. But he thoroughly grasped its conditions, and in his great work on Naval Warfare (first published in 1891) he enunciated its principles with great cogency and with keen historic insight. The central idea of his teaching was that naval supremacy is the condition precedent of all vigorous military offensive across the seas, and, conversely, that no vigorous military offensive can be undertaken across the seas until the naval force of the enemy has been accounted for either destroyed or defeated and compelled to withdraw to the shelter of its own ports, or at least driven from the seas by the menace of a force it dare not encounter in the open. This broad and indefeasible principle he enunciated and defended in essay after essay, in lecture after lecture, until what at first was rejected as a paradox came in the end to be accepted as a commonplace. He worked quite independently of Captain Mahan, and his chief conclusions were published before Captain Mahan's works appeared.

The admiral died quite suddenly and in the full swing of his literary activity on 13 October 1899, at Steeple Court, Botley, Hants. His latest published work was a biography of his friend Sir Astley Cooper Key, and his last article was a critical examination of the tactics adopted at Trafalgar, which showed his acumen and insight at their best.
