= George Thomas Colomb =

British Army general and a talented amateur artist

George Thomas Colomb (4 June 1787 – 20 March 1874) was a British Army general and a talented amateur artist.

He was born in Twickenham, London, the son of Swiss émigré Pierre Philippe Colomb (1744–1799) and his wife Maria Elizabeth Burchell (1746–1828).

He joined the British Army in 1808 as an ensign in the 96th Regiment of Foot. He served on the staff in America in 1814/15 and was promoted to major in 1817 and lieutenant-colonel in 1841.

By that time he was living in Dublin and exhibited several of his paintings at the Royal Hibernian Academy. From then on, he was almost an annual exhibitor until 1868 and elected an Honorary Member of the Academy in 1854.

In 1843 he was appointed Commandant of the Royal Hibernian Military School in Phoenix Park, a position he vacated when promoted major-general in 1858. From 1869 to his death, he was colonel of the 97th (The Earl of Ulster's) Regiment of Foot. He was promoted full general on 7 February 1874.

In 1820, he married Mary, the daughter of Sir Abraham Bradley King, 1st Baronet, with whom he had four sons and three daughters. His eldest son, George Halton Colomb, was a colonel in the Royal Artillery and also a competent amateur painter. His third son was Vice-Admiral Philip Howard Colomb and the fourth Sir John Charles Ready Colomb, naval strategist and M.P.

He died in Dalkey, Dublin, in 1874.

Military offices
Preceded by John Campbell	Colonel of the 97th (The Earl of Ulster's) Regiment of Foot; 1869–1874	Succeeded by John Maxwell Perceval
