= Edwin Bousfield =

English cricketer

Edwin James Bousfield (21 May 1838 – 8 January 1895) was an English cricketer active from 1860 to 1878 who played for Lancashire. He was born in Manchester and died in Torquay. He appeared in sixteen first-class matches as a righthanded batsman who sometimes kept wicket. He scored 321 runs with a highest score of 32 and completed 23 catches with five stumpings.
