= Norwood Junction rail accident =

1891 railway accident in England

Coordinates: 51.39901°N 0.07369°W

Details
- Date: 1 May 1891
- Location: Norwood Junction railway station, South Norwood, Surrey
- Country: England
- Line: Brighton Main Line
- Operator: London, Brighton and South Coast Railway
- Cause: Bridge collapse

Statistics
- Trains: 1
- Passengers: ~200
- Deaths: 0
- Injured: 1

The Norwood Junction railway crash occurred on 1 May 1891, when a cast-iron underbridge over Portland Road, 60 yards (55 m) north-east of Norwood Junction railway station, fractured under the weight of an express train from Brighton to London Bridge.

The locomotive, No. 175 Hayling, crossed the bridge safely along with most of its carriages, but the brake van fell into the gap created by the failure. There were no serious casualties: one passenger suffered a dislocated ankle, four others sustained minor injuries, and the guard in the leading brake van received head and arm injuries. The accident drew attention to the structural weaknesses of cast-iron underbridges, particularly those installed in the 1830s and 1840s, when locomotives and rolling stock were significantly lighter.

== Causes ==
The bridge belonged to the London Brighton and South Coast Railway and had been reconstructed in 1859. The Board of Trade investigation was carried out by General Hutchinson, who had investigated a similar bridge failure at Carlisle in 1875. He found that the single girder that cracked was seriously flawed with a very large hidden casting defect in the flange and web. Even if perfect, the girder design did not meet current Board of Trade requirements for safety margins on cast-iron girder underbridges, and this was already known from a previous accident.

The attention of the Brighton Company was drawn by the Board of Trade to this deficiency of strength after ... the accident on this bridge in December 1876 when two identical girders at a different part of the same bridge were broken by an engine getting off the rails, and they were then recommended to substitute stronger girders in their place, a recommendation to which unfortunately no attention was paid, or the present serious accident would have been prevented; the Brighton Company is therefore, in my opinion, deserving of much blame for having omitted to substitute stronger girders for the existing ones after attention had been thus specially directed to the weakness of the latter

A cast-iron rail bridge girder had fractured under a passing train at Inverythan in Scotland in 1882, with five passengers killed and many more injured. The Board of Trade investigation report on the Inverythan accident had commented on the problem of latent defects, but had concentrated attention in the first instance on composite girders, bolted together mid-span, and those of over 25 feet (7.6 m) span. The Portland Road bridge did not use composite girders, and its span was 25 feet (7.6 m). (The failed girder in the Carlisle incident was non-composite, with a 25 foot (7.6 m) span and had a major hidden casting defect. It had been built before the 1847 Dee bridge disaster and the consequent specification by the Board of Trade of required wide safety margins on cast-iron structures; even if perfect it would have not have met them. The bridge had been rebuilt with wrought-iron girders and the failure had not triggered any wider survey of cast-iron bridges.)

General Hutchinson recommended that all cast-iron girder bridges on the LB&SCR network be inspected. The task fell to Sir John Fowler, who recommended that many be replaced by wrought iron (or preferably steel) structures, commenting that

the result of my investigation does not indicate any peculiar weakness in the Brighton bridges which are neither better nor worse in that respect than those on similar lines of railway at home or abroad

The accident led the Board of Trade to issue a circular requesting details of all cast-iron underbridges on the UK network. There were thousands of them, and most were gradually replaced, but as of 2007 Network Rail stated that there are still many hundreds of cast-iron beam overbridges remaining, many with very low weight restrictions.
