= Constantine Moorsom =

English Royal Navy vice-admiral

Vice-Admiral Constantine Moorsom
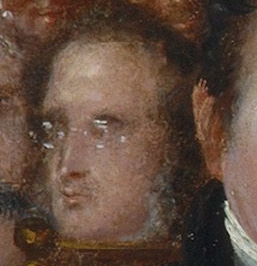
- Moorsom at the 1840 Anti-Slavery Conference
- Born: 22 September 1792; High Stakesby, Whitby, North Riding of Yorkshire
- Died: 26 May 1861 (aged 68); Russell Square, London
- Resting place: Kensal Green Cemetery
- Occupation: Royal Navy Vice-Admiral
- Known for: Innovation
- Spouse: Mary
- Children: many
- Parent: Robert and Eleanor Moorsom
- Relatives: William Moorsom

Vice-Admiral Constantine Richard Moorsom (22 September 1792 – 26 May 1861) was a vice-admiral in the Royal Navy. He commanded HMS Fury a Hecla-class bomb vessel which saw wartime service in the Bombardment of Algiers, an attack on Barbary pirates at Algiers in HMS Fury in August, 1816. Moorsom was the son of Admiral Sir Robert Moorsom, a veteran of Trafalgar. Moorsom was on the roster of HMS Revenge, his father's ship, when it was at the Battle of Trafalgar. However records show that Constantine was actually at school at the time of the battle. Moorsom rose to be chairman of the London & North Western Railway.

== Biography ==
=== Early life ===
Moorsom was born on 22 September 1792, the son of Admiral Sir Robert Moorsom who was to be a Knight Commander of the Bath and a veteran of the Trafalgar. His mother was born Eleanor Scarth.

=== Royal Navy ===
Moorsom entered the Royal Navy College in Portsmouth where he was awarded a first medal and three prizes for mathematics. His service was noted by not only his progression but the record of his innovation. Moorsom's younger brothers also joined the navy. Henry Moorsom was killed in 1826 whilst in command of the sloop HMS Jasper. His other brother William Scarth Moorsom left the navy in 1832 and became a successful railway engineer after training with Robert Stephenson. It is said that the brothers inherited their fathers talent for drawing and poetry. His sister, Maria Margaret, married in 1815 and had seven children with the Rev. Longueville Massell. His naval career started with his first posting to HMS Revenge which at the time was in the Atlantic off Portugal. The ship was involved in the defence of Cádiz. He became a lieutenant in 1816 after returning to England on board HMS Warspite. He was then with HMS Superb until 1814 when he was rewarded with his own command of a sloop at Bermuda – HMS Goree. He was with the boat a year then another year with HMS Terror, before taking on the bomb vessel, HMS Fury.

He commanded HMS Fury, a Hecla-class bomb vessel, in the Bombardment of Algiers, an attack on Barbary pirates at Algiers in August, 1816. As a result of the bombardment slaves were released and Moorsom's use of his vessel was put under investigation. It was found that the Fury had fired twice as many mortars as any other boat and that this was due to the fitting which Moorsom had devised. His methods were adopted as standard practice.

Moorsom became a post captain in 1818 and in 1822 his innovation came again to notice when he was put in command of HMS Ariadne. Ariadne had been a problem vessel after she was converted into a corvette with the addition of a quarterdeck to her original frigate frame. This increased her draught and made her difficult to manage, however Moorsom redistributed the storage and not only reported that she was now seaworthy, he sailed her around the Cape of Good Hope to prove the point. He was briefly an acting Commodore in Mauritius, but in 1825 he served for two years as the captain of his father's flagship HMS Prince Regent at Chatham. He took no further sea missions but rose through the ranks to rear-admiral. In 1843 he published an essay on the Principles of Naval Tactics which he updated three years later.

=== Abolitionist ===
Moorsom is below the main speaker's raised shoulder in the painting, which is of the 1840 Anti-Slavery Convention. Move your cursor to identify him or click icon to enlarge

In 1840, Moorsom attended the World Anti-Slavery Convention in London. It was held at the Freemasons Hall on 12 June 1840 The meeting was attended by leading abolitionists from around the world. The portrait above is taken from the commemorative painting where he can be seen behind the head of Joseph Sturge of the Anti-Slavery International, who organised the conference. The painting hangs in the National Portrait Gallery.

=== Railways ===
Constantine also went into the railway business as company secretary at the same company where his brother, William, was engineer. He was elected to the board of the Birmingham and Gloucester Railway in 1841 and almost immediately became its chairman. He remained in this position until his resignation just before the company became part of the Midland Railway in 1843.

He served as a director of the London & Birmingham Railway from 1837 to 1839. He was promoted on 29 August 1851 to be a Rear-Admiral of the Blue. From 1852 until the time of his death on 26 May 1861, he was chairman of the London & North Western Railway. During this time he also chaired a committee for the British Association on steamship performance. He died at Russell Square in London after becoming a vice admiral in 1857 and having fathered a large family with his wife Mary Maude of Silaby Hall in Durham, including the politician James Marshall Moorsom.
