= William Moorsom =

English soldier and engineer (1804–1863)

Captain William Scarth Moorsom (1804–1863) was an English soldier and engineer. After assisting Robert Stephenson he created railway lines in England, Belgium, Germany and Ceylon.

== Early life and career ==
Moorsom was born at Whitby into a military family, the youngest of the four sons of Admiral Sir Robert Moorsom, who had served at the Trafalgar, and his wife Eleanor.

He entered the Royal Military College in 1819, and became especially adept in fortification and military surveying. In 1823 he joined the 79th Highlanders Regiment, then stationed in Ireland. During his stay there, he made a survey of Dublin and its neighbourhood, which remained in use until it was superseded by the publication of the Ordnance Survey. In 1825 he served in the Mediterranean as a lieutenant in the 7th Fusiliers. In 1826 he transferred to the 69th Regiment, and then to the 52nd Light Infantry in Nova Scotia, having been promoted to Captain.

During this time he served as deputy quartermaster-general. He produced a survey of the harbour and environs of Halifax, along with reports on transport feasibility to all parts of the province, and published a monograph Letters From Nova Scotia; comprising Sketches of a Young Country in 1830.

Although he was highly regarded he was unable to purchase a suitable promotion so returned to England and bought out his commission in 1832. He had met his wife, Isabella Ann Morris, daughter of Lewis Wilkins, judge and head of the supreme court, in Nova Scotia. They lived with his father at Cosgrove Priory, near Stony Stratford, until his death in April 1835.

== Railway engineer ==
With his experience of military surveying, Moorsom assisted in the construction of the London and Birmingham Railway construction of which had begun in 1833 and of which his eldest brother, Constantine Richard Moorsom was Secretary to the Board. Moorsom's survey of the valley of the Ouse allowed the railway line to be straightened, and eliminated the need for a large embankment. This feat attracted the attention of Robert Stephenson. He then spent two years studying new railway lines all over the country and in 1836 undertook a survey of the country between Birmingham and Gloucester in order to build a railway. The Birmingham and Gloucester Railway had found Brunel's proposals out of its financial reach. Moorsom's brief in 1836 was to build the line as cheaply as possible, which he did by following open country, thereby avoiding populated areas where land prices were higher. Arriving at the Lickey Hills there was no option but to climb, using cable assistance if necessary.

From experience gained observing mineral railways in the north, Moorsom preferred locomotives. The general opinion at that time was that adhesion was not possible on such a steep incline and so the directors of the company set out to buy stationary engines for cable-haulage. They found the cost prohibitive; so, Moorsom was allowed to continue what was thought to be a considerable gamble. The resulting Lickey Incline has entered railway folklore.

Since no English manufacturer would, or could, supply him, he ordered 4-2-0 locomotives from Norris of Philadelphia in the United States. The loco they supplied had 4-foot (1.219 m) driving wheels, cylinder bore of 10 1/2 inches (267 mm), and 18-inch (460 mm) stroke, weighing 10 1/4 long tons (10.4 t)

Moorsom was also awarded the Telford Medal for his method of using iron caissons filled with concrete and masonry to form the foundations of a three-arch viaduct across the River Avon, near Tewkesbury.

In passing, one of his assistants was Herbert Spencer. F. R. Conder was critical of Moorsom's management style and engineering abilities in his Personal Recollections of English Engineers (1868) Spencer was less recriminatory in his Autobiography (1904), describing Moorsom as a kind man, although he felt that he had treated some subordinates meanly. Chrimes suggests that his problems may have been "due to the financial pressures of bringing up a large family, combined with working for companies which had limited financial resources."

The period of 1844–45 proved to be especially busy with new lines from Birmingham to Wolverhampton, Shrewsbury, Newton, and Chester; the Yarmouth Junction, from Diss and Beccles, the Irish Great Western, from Naas, by Tullamore, to Galway, the Metropolitan Counties Junction, from Gravesend, by Reigate, Dorking, Weybridge, Staines, Rickmansworth, St. Albans, Chelmsford, and Billericay to Tilbury, the London, Hammersmith, Staines, and Windsor, 25 miles, and several smaller lines. The Southampton and Dorchester Railway in 1847 was notable as "Castleman' Corkscrew": its promoters insisted that it should serve as many of the local communities as possible. At this time, Moorsom surveyed the line from Exeter and Plymouth to Falmouth, the West Cornwall Railway, from Truro to Penzance.

In 1845 he was in Ireland working on the Waterford and Kilkenny Railway. Of note was a timber viaduct over the River Nore, 85 feet (25.91 m) in height and of 200 feet (60.96 m) span, at the time the largest of its type in the British Isles.

Though the design was not used, he won the Prussian government's engineering prize in 1850 for his design for a bridge to cross the Rhine at Cologne on the line from Prussia's Rhine Province to Antwerp in Belgium for the Königlich Preußische und Großherzoglich Hessische Staatseisenbahn (K.P.u.G.H.St.E.).

For the next four years there was a general retraction of the industry and in 1852 Moorsom became involved with the Britannia and Baltimore Mining Company to prospect for and mine gold in the United Kingdom. Although some gold was produced it was not enough to make the company viable. During this period he was appointed engineer to the Cromford and High Peak Railway which was in deep financial difficulty. In 1857 the Stockport, Disley and Whaley Bridge Railway was opened, with a proposal to link with the Cromford line. Plans were laid to capitalise on this by substantially improving the line. The necessary funds were not forthcoming, however, and there was opposition from other railway companies. The C&HPR and Moorsom parted company in about 1856.

In 1856 he was asked to survey the railway from Kandy to Colombo Ceylon (Sri Lanka). He explored six routes to connect Colombo to Kandy. His famous 1857 report recommended a 79-mile route through the steep mountain passes. In 1860 The Colonial Secretary refused to support Captain Moorsom's plan unless he published his full calculations. The Colony paid off the company rather than incur the heavy outlay which the Board and its engineers insisted upon as essential. In 1862 the colony obtained and accepted a tender for the construction of the work upon terms which demonstrated that those offered by Captain Moorsom were in fact correct. Copies of the report are extremely rare and are only known to exist in a handful of institutional libraries.

== Last years ==
In 1860, Moorsom's wife Isabella died and, in 1862 he was Engineer with the Ringwood, Christchurch and Bournemouth Railway

He had been elected an Associate of the Institution of Civil Engineers, on 24 March 1835, and was transferred to the class of Members on 20 February 1849. Among a number of papers that he read was, in 1852, Description of the viaduct erected over the river Nore, near Thomastown . He became a Member of the Society of Arts on 31 January 1843.

He occupied his retirement by writing a history of his regiment and died of cancer, after a long and painful illness, at his home, 17A Great George Street, Westminster, on 3 June 1863, aged 61, and was buried at Kensal Green cemetery.
