= Inverythan rail accident =

1882 railway accident in Scotland

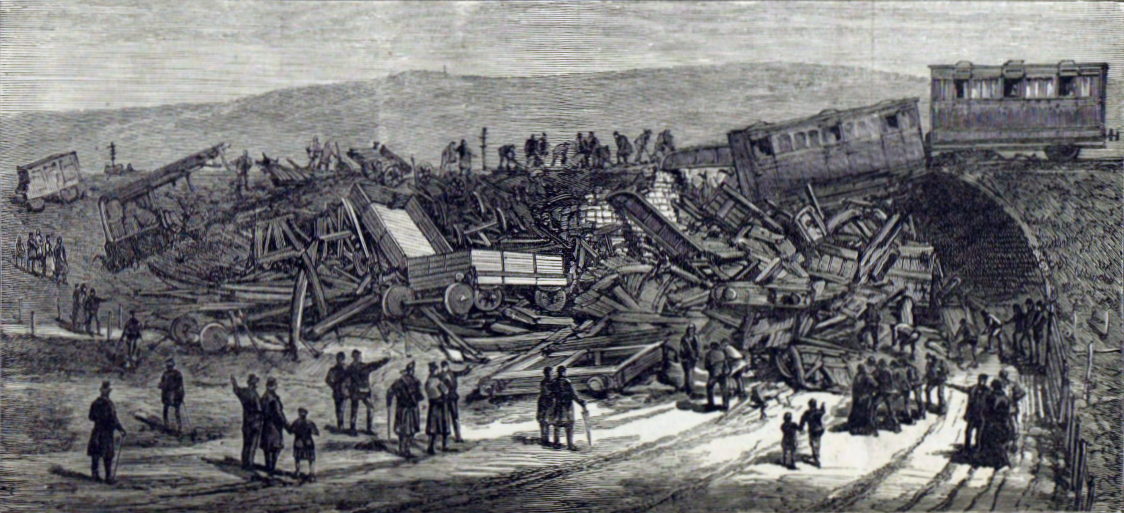
- The Illustrated London News illustration of crash scene

Details
- Date: 27 November 1882
- Location: Aberdeenshire; 57°27′38″N 2°24′22″W
- Country: Scotland
- Line: Great North of Scotland Railway, Aberdeen to Macduff
- Cause: fatigue crack

Statistics
- Deaths: 8
- Injured: 14 others

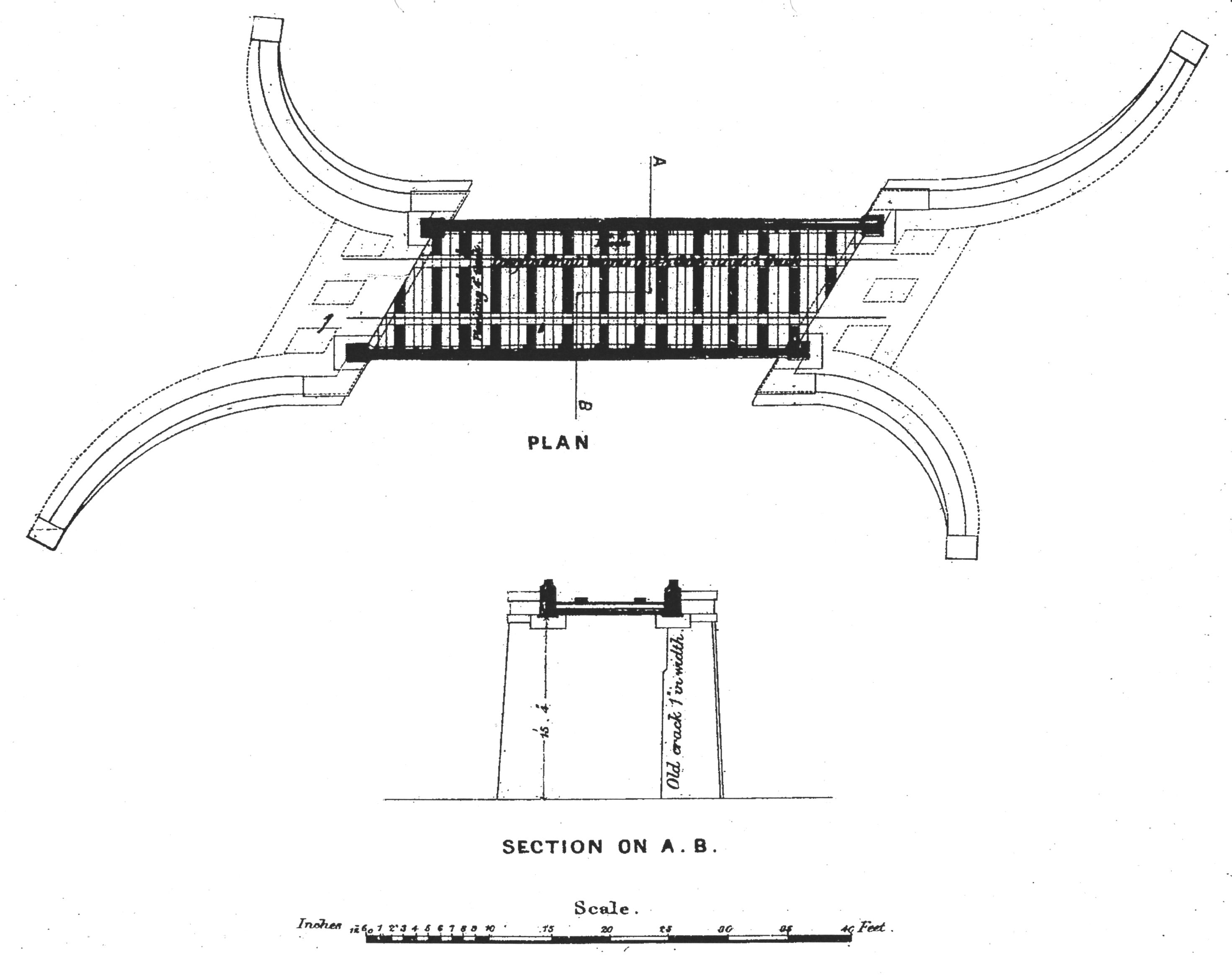
The track was supported by wooden beams laid on the lower flanges of the massive castings used to form the main structure. Each of the two main spans were made from two castings bolted together at the centre of the bridge. Each casting was curved upwards towards the centre, so as to counteract the greatest load there, and the central joint was reinforced underneath by a wrought iron boss.

The Inverythan rail accident occurred when a faulty girder collapsed on a 39 by 15 ft (11.9 by 4.6 m) single-track railway underbridge between Auchterless and Fyvie. The engine of the freight/passenger train (5 loaded wagons, 4 carriages) crossed safely, but most of the train fell into the gap onto a road below.

== Cause ==
A simple vertical crack with a freshly fractured surface and old rust marks on the face was easily distinguished to the side of the centre joint, extending from the bottom flange to the top of the girder. This was associated with a casting defect hidden behind a surface skin of sound metal at the thickest part of the section where the flanges met the web. This was described by the accident report as:

a large honeycomb, or drawhole, which measured [3 1/2 in (89 mm)] across at the face, and narrowed to about [1 1/2 in (38 mm)] inside, [2 3/8 in (60 mm)] in extreme depth and [6 in (150 mm)] in extreme length, extending inwards and downwards ...but not within [1 1/2 in (38 mm)] of the outer face of the joint flange. The total capacity of the hole, measured by filling it with water, was [15 1/2 cu in (254 cm^{3})] and, as the metal immediately round the hole was not sound, this amount does not measure the actual extent of the flaw.

There were other signs of poor foundry practice when the girder had been cast; honeycombing elsewhere, a cold shut (incomplete fusion between different streams of filling metal), and residual stresses in the girder web (as a consequence of which, when sample cores were being drilled for testing, the web (but not the flanges) fractured along the line of holes. Whilst the metal appeared to be of good quality to the naked eye, the tested tensile strength of the metal varied widely from the shaft lowest of ~4.5 tsi (c 70 MPa) (close to the honeycombing) with a mean of 7.5 tsi (c 115 MPa).

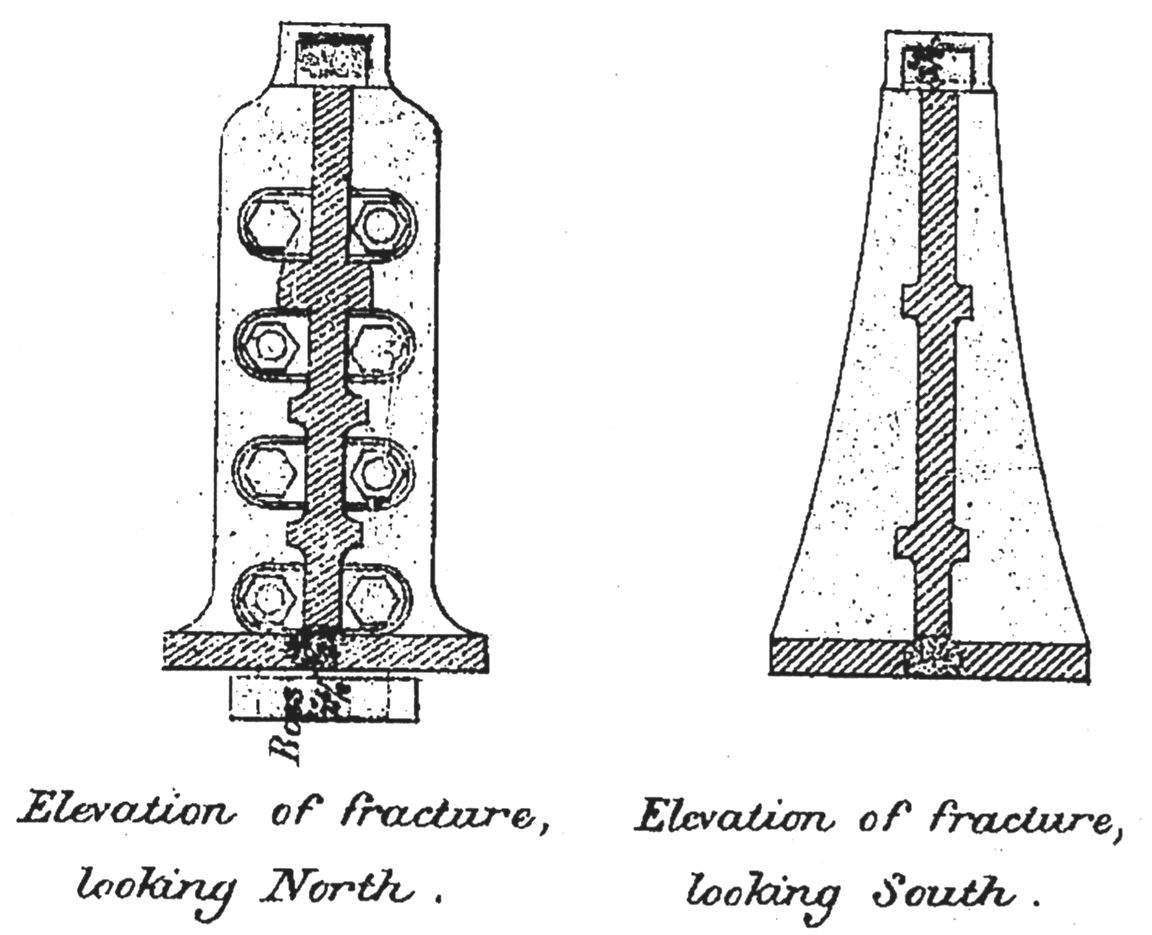
Section of beam showing fracture

The accident report says that the girder if sound would have had a breaking strength of 80 tons and concludes that the theoretical strength of the girder was "above but only just above" the Board of Trade requirement (live load × 6 + dead load × 3). However this appears inconsistent with the figures quoted by the report for dead weight (21 ton shared between 2 girders) and live load (21 ton shared between two girders).

The actual strength fell below this because of the casting defect:

The sectional area of the bottom flange would at one place be reduced from [36 sq in (230 cm^{2})] to only [28 sq in (180 cm^{2})], thus enormously reducing the strength of the girder.

It was considered that the fault could not have been detected by routine inspections, so no blame attached to those responsible for inspecting the bridge, but this conclusion gave the BoT inspector considerable concern:

For, if one such girder, which was of sufficient theoretical strength when cast, and which, being in constant use for 25 years, had never shown any signs of weakness or any outward flaw, suddenly breaks down, owing to a defect which must have existed when it was originally made, and laid latent ever since, it is very difficult to know what steps should be taken to guard against the recurrence of a like disaster.

== Aftermath ==
The railway's eight bridges with similar double structure were replaced as quickly as possible, and a warning was circulated to all British railways with similar cast iron under-bridges. Little further action was taken until the 1891 Norwood Junction rail accident of a first class train which injured 1 businessman because of a cast iron girder fracture from a latent defect.
