= Robert Moorsom =

Royal Navy Admiral (1760-1835)

Admiral Sir Robert Moorsom KCB
- Born: 8 June 1760
- Died: 14 April 1835 (aged 74); Cosgrove Priory, Northamptonshire, England
- Burial place: St Peter’s Church, Cosgrove, Northamptonshire
- Military career
- Allegiance: United Kingdom
- Branch: Royal Navy
- Rank: Admiral
- Commands: HMS Ariel; HMS Astraea; HMS Hindostan; HMS Revenge; Nore Command; Cape of Good Hope Station
- Conflicts: American Revolutionary War; French Revolutionary Wars; Napoleonic Wars
- Awards: Knight Commander of the Order of the Bath; Colonel of Marines

Admiral Sir Robert Moorsom KCB (8 June 1760 – 14 April 1835) was an officer of the Royal Navy who served during the American War of Independence, the French Revolutionary Wars and the Napoleonic Wars. His very active service career was especially highlighted by his actions in 1805 at the Battle of Trafalgar, where his ship HMS Revenge was severely damaged and Moorsom was himself seriously wounded.

== Life ==
Born into a seagoing family at Whitby in Yorkshire in 1760, Moorsom was late to the navy, only joining aged 17, a good four years later than most of his contemporaries. He made up for his late arrival with exhaustive service, which included action at the Great Siege of Gibraltar and at the battle of Cape Spartel. He was made lieutenant rapidly in 1784 following commendations from an action against a French convoy to America two years before, and then profited by the buildup to war in 1790 when he was granted promotion to Post captain.

His service in the Revolutionary Wars was unremarkable, maintaining position in the blockading fleets of several ports where there was small opportunity for glory or action, especially in ships of the line, which he had soon graduated into. Following the Peace of Amiens, Moorsom took over the newly built Revenge and was placed under Admiral Collingwood's command in the Mediterranean, accompanying his admiral to Cádiz and thence to the battle of Trafalgar in October 1805.

At the battle, Revenge was situated far to the rear of Collingwood's division, but due to her recent construction she was a very fast and agile ship and thus was able to overtake two ships in front of her, aiming at the Spanish flagship Principe de Asturias but missing her and becoming embroiled in a duel with the smaller San Ildefonso which drifted off damaged. The Revenge next engaged the Achille and dismasted her leaving her vulnerable to attack from following ships who later sank her. The French Aigle was next, Revenge ramming her and damaging her so she too drifted off from action. Finally reaching the Principe de Asturias, the Revenge was dwarfed by her enormous opponent, and was significantly damaged by the broadsides from the bigger ship, splinters from which badly wounded Moorsom and killed or wounded over 70 of his crew. Asturias was later driven off by the aid of HMS Dreadnought and HMS Thunderer, who rescued the badly holed and slowly sinking Revenge.

By a miracle of seamanship, the Revenge was returned to Gibraltar despite the raging storm and Moorsom was one of the first officers dispatched home, sent to recuperate from his wounds. He was richly rewarded for his heroic actions in the battle but due to the surge in promotions which the battle brought combined with his injuries he was unable to find a ship and never returned to the sea as a captain. He was instead given numerous shore jobs, including carrying the great banner at Lord Nelson's funeral, appointment to rear-admiral and a position with the Lords of the Admiralty and following the end of the war a career in backbench politics (as MP for Queenborough 1812–1820), as Surveyor-General of the Ordnance. He went on to be Commander-in-Chief, Chatham in 1824 He was promoted through the flag ranks.

Robert Moorsom died peacefully in 1835 as a full Admiral of the Blue and a Knight Commander of the Order of the Bath and was buried at St Peter's Church, Cosgrove, Northamptonshire, where a memorial plaque to him and his wife Eleanor (sister of cotton milling entrepreneur Jonathan Scarth) can still be seen. Robert's legacy included his talent for poetry and drawing which he passed on to his two sons, Vice Admiral Constantine Richard Moorsom 1792-1861 and Captain William Scarth Moorsom, an early railway engineer. A descendant (via Constantine) is the English journalist Toby Young and Canadian journalist Richard Moorsom Harrison.

Parliament of the United Kingdom
Preceded by Richard Wellesley; Hon. John Villiers	Member of Parliament for Queenborough; 1812–1820; With: Hon. John Villiers 1812; John Osborn 1812–1818; Hon. Edmund Phipps 1818–1820	Succeeded by Hon. John Villiers; George Peter Holford
Military offices
Preceded by James Murray Hadden	Surveyor-General of the Ordnance; 1810–1815	Succeeded by Sir Ulysses Burgh
Preceded by Sir Benjamin Hallowell	Commander-in-Chief, The Nore; 1824	Succeeded by Sir Henry Blackwood
Preceded by Joseph Nourse	Commander-in-Chief, Cape of Good Hope Station; 1825	Succeeded by Hood Hanway Christian
