= 2002 ITU Triathlon World Championships =

International sports competition

ITU Triathlon World Championships
- Location: Cancún, Mexico
- Date: 9-10 November 2002

Champions
- Men: Iván Raña (Spain)
- Women: Leanda Cave (United Kingdom)

The 2002 ITU Triathlon World Championships was a triathlon competition held in Cancún in Mexico on 9-10 November 2002 and organized by the International Triathlon Union, now World Triathlon. This was the 14th edition of the competition inaugurated in 1989. The event crowned the world champions in elite, junior elite and, for the first time, under-23 (U23) elite triathlon for the 2002 season.

All races for elite and under 23 men and women consisted of a 1.5 km (0.93 mi) swim, 40 km (25 mi) bike and 20 km (12 mi) run, referred to as 'Standard' or 'Olympic' distance triathlon, significantly shorter than the classic Ironman Triathlon event. The Junior race consisted of a sprint distance event of roughly half the senior length, a 0.75 km (0.47 mi) swim, 20 km (12 mi) bike and 10 km (6.2 mi) run.

== Medal Summary ==
Event	Gold		Silver		Bronze	
Elite
Men	Ivan Raña; Spain	1:50:41	Peter Robertson; Australia	1:51:07	Andrew Johns; Great Britain	1:51:17
Women	Leanda Cave; Great Britain	2:01:31	Barbara Lindquist; United States	2:01:41	Michelle Dillon; Great Britain	2:02:11
Under 23 elite
U23 men	Brad Kahlefeldt; Australia	1:51:41	Sven Riederer; Switzerland	1:53:04	Stuart Hayes; Great Britain	1:53:08
U23 women	Pilar Hidalgo Iglesias; Spain	2:01:42	Mirinda Carfrae; Australia	2:02:41	Nicola Spirig; Switzerland	2:02:55
Junior elite
Junior men	Terenzo Bozzone; New Zealand	56:00	David Hauss; France	56:03	Tyler Butterfield; Bermuda	56:04
Junior women	Marion Lorblanchet; France	1:01:19	Wendy De Boer; Netherlands	1:01:20	Elizabeth May; Luxembourg	1:01:46

== Results ==
The following are the results of the elite races:

=== Men ===
Rank	Athlete	Nation	Swim	T1	Bike	T2	Run	Overall time
1st place, gold medalist(s)	Ivan Raña Fuentes	Spain (ESP)	19:56	1:29	56:19	0:52	32:05	1:50:41
2nd place, silver medalist(s)	Peter Robertson	Australia (AUS)	20:03	1:25	56:20	0:48	32:31	1:51:07
3rd place, bronze medalist(s)	Andrew Johns	Great Britain (GBR)	20:07	1:28	56:11	0:55	32:36	1:51:17
4	Greg Bennett	Australia (AUS)	19:54	1:35	56:19	0:58	32:41	1:51:27
5	Volodymyr Polikarpenko	Ukraine (UKR)	19:23	1:27	0:57	0:57	32:50	1:51:37
6	Maik Petzold	Germany (GER)	19:51	1:29	56:24	0:56	33:05	1:51:45
7	Chris Hill	Australia (AUS)	19:51	1:37	56:12	0:59	33:24	1:52:03
8	Kris Gemmel	New Zealand (NZL)	19:27	1:26	56:55	0:57	33:25	1:52:10
9	Dmitriy Gaag	Kazakhstan (KAZ)	20:06	1:28	56:11	0:53	33:41	1:52:19
10	Matthew Reed	United States (USA)	19:53	1:38	55:30	0:53	34:36	1:52:30
11	Rasmus Henning	Denmark (DEN)	19:54	1:37	56:16	0:57	33:51	1:52:35
12	Hunter Kemper	United States (USA)	19:53	2:09	55:48	1:02	33:44	1:52:36
13	Norbert Domnik	Austria (AUT)	20:25	1:31	55:53	0:55	33:53	1:52:37
14	Martin Krnavek	Czech Republic (CZE)	-	-	-	-	33:53	1:52:43
15	Csaba Kuttor	Hungary (HUN)	19:50	1:41	56:19	1:04	34:01	1:52:55
16	Filip Ospaly	Czech Republic (CZE)	19:49	1:34	56:25	0:57	34:16	1:53:01
17	Marc Jenkins	Great Britain (GBR)	19:54	1:30	55:36	0:53	35:17	1:53:10
18	Joe Umphenour	United States (USA)	19:53	1:30	56:26	0:58	34:27	1:53:14
19	Stefan Vuckovic	Germany (GER)	-	-	-	-	34:31	1:53:22
20	Shane Reed	New Zealand (NZL)	19:57	1:35	56:17	0:57	34:40	1:53:26
21	Mark Fretta	United States (USA)	19:56	1:34	56:16	0:54	34:49	1:53:29
22	Stephane Poulat	France (FRA)	19:25	1:30	56:49	0:57	34:53	1:53:34
23	Andy Kelsey	United States (USA)	19:59	1:34	56:18	1:03	34:43	1:53:37
24	Richard Stannard	Great Britain (GBR)	19:20	1:35	56:52	1:02	34:57	1:53:46
25	Andreas Raelert	Germany (GER)	19:57	1:35	56:13	0:59	35:09	1:53:53
26	Bryce Quirk	Australia (AUS)	19:57	1:37	56:16	0:53	35:14	1:53:57
27	Frederic Belaubre	France (FRA)	19:24	1:32	56:54	1:01	35:11	1:54:02
28	Paulo Miyashiro	Brazil (BRA)	19:56	1:38	56:17	1:02	35:22	1:54:15
29	Takumi Obara	Japan (JPN)	20:06	1:48	55:52	0:58	35:35	1:54:19
30	Tim Don	Great Britain (GBR)	20:24	1:22	59:00	0:52	32:43	1:54:21
31	Eneko Llanos Burguera	Spain (ESP)	19:59	1:34	56:12	1:00	36:18	1:55:03
32	Sylvain Dodet	France (FRA)	20:00	1:32	55:27	0:55	37:09	1:55:04
33	Reto Hug	Switzerland (SUI)	19:59	1:36	56:11	1:01	36:21	1:55:08
34	Hiroyuki Nishiuchi	Japan (JPN)	19:53	1:37	56:19	1:01	36:23	1:55:13
35	Andrey Glushenko	Kazakhstan (KAZ)	19:48	1:35	56:25	0:59	36:53	1:55:40
36	Dennis Looze	Netherlands (NED)	19:55	1:42	56:14	1:04	36:47	1:55:42
37	Samuel Pierreclaud	France (FRA)	19:55	1:43	56:11	1:03	36:50	1:55:42
38	Jose Maria Merchan Illanes	Spain (ESP)	20:32	1:36	57:46	0:59	34:55	1:55:48
39	Conrad Stoltz	South Africa (RSA)	20:27	1:34	54:59	0:58	37:57	1:55:55
40	Hektor Llanos Burguera	Spain (ESP)	20:26	1:35	58:49	0:59	34:07	1:55:56
41	Eligio Cervantes Islas	Mexico (MEX)	20:27	1:31	58:51	1:00	34:28	1:56:17
42	Bevan Docherty	New Zealand (NZL)	20:12	1:26	59:13	0:53	34:49	1:56:33
43	Virgilio De Castilho	Brazil (BRA)	20:24	1:34	57:57	0:58	35:42	1:56:35
44	Javier Rosas Sierra	Mexico (MEX)	20:16	1:29	59:04	0:56	34:53	1:56:38
45	Teppei Takeuchi	Japan (JPN)	19:58	1:36	56:16	1:13	37:37	1:56:40
46	Brent Foster	New Zealand (NZL)	19:18	1:27	57:03	1:07	37:50	1:56:45
47	Carl Blasco	France (FRA)	19:51	1:37	56:20	1:02	38:13	1:57:03
48	Miles Stewart	Australia (AUS)	19:56	1:30	-	-	-	1:57:23
49	Simon Whitfield	Canada (CAN)	20:25	1:31	58:56	0:54	36:10	1:57:56
50	Daniel Fontana	Italy (ITA)	20:24	1:30	57:59	0:57	37:12	1:58:02
51	Arturo Garza Heiras	Mexico (MEX)	20:20	1:34	58:01	0:57	37:10	1:58:02
52	Leandro Macedo	Brazil (BRA)	20:53	1:27	1:00:29	0:59	34:27	1:58:15
53	Jose Luis Zepeda	Mexico (MEX)	20:29	1:40	58:43	0:59	36:57	1:58:48
54	Courtney Atkinson	Australia (AUS)	19:28	1:26	56:53	0:56	40:54	1:59:37
55	Simon Agoston	Austria (AUT)	20:22	1:38	58:53	0:57	37:50	1:59:40
56	Vasilis Krommidas	Greece (GRE)	20:25	1:32	58:55	1:04	37:56	1:59:52
57	Brian Fleischmann	United States (USA)	20:19	1:33	58:56	0:57	38:37	2:00:22
58	Victor Plata	United States (USA)	20:27	1:39	58:45	1:00	39:42	2:01:33
59	Hamish Carter	New Zealand (NZL)	20:27	-	-	-	41:24	2:02:16
60	Sebastien Laflamme	Canada (CAN)	20:51	1:35	1:00:24	1:01	41:08	2:04:59
61	Shane Armstrong	Canada (CAN)	20:21	1:38	58:55	1:20	44:01	2:06:15
-	Guangxue Qiao	China (CHN)	22:30	1:48	-	-	-	DNF
-	Esteban Kahs-Garay	Chile (CHI)	20:52	1:39	-	-	-	DNF
-	Will Vargas	Colombia (COL)	20:32	1:35	-	-	-	DNF
-	Nick Sacco	South Africa (RSA)	23:45	1:48	-	-	-	DNF
-	Bruno Arochi Castillo	Mexico (MEX)	22:36	1:26	-	-	-	DNF
-	Giuseppe Ferraro	Italy (ITA)	20:48	1:32	-	-	-	DNF
-	Axel Zeebroek	Belgium (BEL)	19:56	1:42	-	-	-	DNF
-	Cedric Deanaz	France (FRA)	20:34	1:38	-	-	-	DNF
-	Junichi Yamamoto	Japan (JPN)	20:55	1:35	-	-	-	DNF
-	Jose Uzziel Valderrabano	Mexico (MEX)	20:40	1:37	-	-	-	DNF
-	Xavier Llobet Sallent	Spain (ESP)	20:23	1:32	-	-	-	DNF
-	Daniel Lee Chi Wo	Hong Kong (HKG)	20:56	1:33	-	-	-	DNF
-	Olivier Marceau	Switzerland (SUI)	20:07	1:28	56:12	7:47	-	DNF
-	Juraci Moreira	Brazil (BRA)	20:35	1:32	58:49	1:01	-	DNF
-	Hideo Fukui	Japan (JPN)	-	-	-	-	-	DNS
-	Gilberto Gonzalez	Venezuela (VEN)	-	-	-	-	-	DNS
Key : DNF - did not finish ; DNS - did not start

=== Women ===
Rank	Athlete	Nation	Swim	T1	Bike	T2	Run	Overall time
1st place, gold medalist(s)	Leanda Cave	Great Britain (GBR)	20:04	1:28	1:01:10	0:44	38:05	2:01:31
2nd place, silver medalist(s)	Barbara Lindquist	United States (USA)	19:59	1:31	1:01:11	0:42	38:18	2:01:41
3rd place, bronze medalist(s)	Michelle Dillon	Great Britain (GBR)	20:55	1:24	1:01:54	0:42	37:16	2:02:11
4	Michellie Jones	Australia (AUS)	20:51	-	-	-	-	2:02:25
5	Nicole Hackett	Australia (AUS)	19:57	1:32	1:01:11	0:45	39:10	2:02:35
6	Anja Dittmer	Germany (GER)	20:58	1:26	1:02:34	0:45	37:01	2:02:44
7	Laura Bennett	United States (USA)	20:02	1:28	1:01:10	0:46	39:28	2:02:54
8	Sharon Donnelly	Canada (CAN)	20:04	1:29	1:01:09	0:47	39:50	2:03:19
9	Sandra Soldan	Brazil (BRA)	20:37	1:31	1:02:46	0:53	37:42	2:03:29
10	Carol Montgomery	Canada (CAN)	21:04	1:27	1:04:33	0:51	35:48	2:03:43
11	Kathleen Smet	Belgium (BEL)	21:01	1:29	1:02:23	0:59	37:56	2:03:48
12	Loretta Harrop	Australia (AUS)	20:01	1:30	1:01:11	0:46	40:30	2:03:58
13	Siri Lindley	United States (USA)	20:40	1:29	1:02:44	0:47	38:30	2:04:10
14	Liz Blatchford	Great Britain (GBR)	20:41	1:27	1:02:45	0:45	38:42	2:04:20
15	Joelle Tesche	Germany (GER)	20:07	1:37	1:03:09	0:44	38:47	2:04:24
16	Machiko Nakanishi	Japan (JPN)	20:48	1:28	1:02:37	0:54	38:43	2:04:30
17	Andrea Whitcombe	Great Britain (GBR)	20:54	1:33	1:02:35	0:39	39:09	2:04:50
18	Christiane Pilz	Germany (GER)	20:59	1:29	1:02:23	0:38	39:58	2:05:27
19	Ana Burgos Acuña	Spain (ESP)	21:51	1:37	1:03:35	0:50	37:39	2:05:32
20	Susan Williams	United States (USA)	20:55	1:34	1:02:25	0:47	40:23	2:06:04
21	Ainhoa Murua Zubizarreta	Spain (ESP)	20:54	1:36	1:02:24	0:45	40:20	2:06:09
22	Pip Taylor	Australia (AUS)	20:16	nr	1:04:42	0:38	41:07	2:06:43
23	Jessica Harrison	France (FRA)	not recorded					2:06:50
24	Sheila Taormina	United States (USA)	20:01	1:35	1:01:04	0:46	43:34	2:07:00
25	Ewa Dederko	Poland (POL)	21:51	1:31	1:03:42	0:48	39:33	2:07:24
26	Megan Hall	South Africa (RSA)	20:54	1:36	1:02:26	0:48	41:52	2:07:35
27	Nathalie Daumas	France (FRA)	21:01	1:36	1:04:25	0:47	40:11	2:08:00
28	Samantha Warriner	New Zealand (NZL)	21:19	1:30	1:04:14	0:48	40:14	2:08:05
29	Gillian Kornell	Canada (CAN)	21:57	1:29	1:03:37	0:45	40:23	2:08:11
30	Barbara Kösser	Germany (GER)	20:47	1:45	1:04:31	0:51	40:31	2:08:25
31	Sibylle Matter Bruegger	Switzerland (SUI)	21:43	1:37	1:03:41	0:47	40:52	2:08:40
32	Ingrid Van Lubek	Netherlands (NED)	21:41	1:37	1:03:43	0:56	40:48	2:08:45
33	Kiyomi Niwata	Japan (JPN)	21:51	1:33	1:03:38	0:48	41:01	2:08:51
34	Lucie Zelenkova	Czech Republic (CZE)	20:46	1:41	1:02:27	0:50	43:12	2:08:56
35	Nina Anisimova	Russia (RUS)	21:03	1:33	1:04:28	0:52	41:10	2:09:06
36	Christine Jeffrey	Canada (CAN)	20:09	1:39	1:03:08	0:50	43:24	2:09:10
37	Stephanie Deanaz	France (FRA)	21:52	1:33	1:03:45	0:47	41:57	2:09:54
38	Natasha Filliol	Canada (CAN)	22:42	1:31	1:06:05	0:48	38:58	2:10:04
39	Renata Berkova	Czech Republic (CZE)	21:56	1:34	1:06:52	0:46	39:09	2:10:17
40	Shizuka Kutsuna	Japan (JPN)	20:52	1:37	1:05:20	0:50	42:14	2:10:52
41	Miyuki Biwata	Japan (JPN)	22:40	1:39	1:05:58	0:44	40:10	2:11:11
42	Maki Nishiuchi	Japan (JPN)	21:11	1:37	1:04:15	0:58	44:04	2:12:05
43	Kelly Williamson	United States (USA)	20:56	1:33	1:07:52	0:50	41:22	2:12:33
44	Hongni Wang	China (CHN)	22:46	1:36	1:05:57	0:45	41:43	2:12:47
45	Gisele Bertucci	Brazil (BRA)	21:56	1:42	1:06:42	0:48	43:07	2:14:14
46	Delphine Pelletier	France (FRA)	21:56	1:33	1:06:52	0:54	43:25	2:14:40
47	Saori Ohmatsu	Japan (JPN)	22:46	1:33	1:06:01	0:49	44:39	2:15:47
48	Meng Shi	China (CHN)	21:09	1:43	1:04:13	0:52	47:58	2:15:55
49	Lin Xing	China (CHN)	22:43	1:40	1:05:56	0:44	45:21	2:16:24
-	Fiorella D'Croz	Colombia (COL)	22:45	1:40	-	-	-	DNF
-	Jill Savege	Canada (CAN)	20:12	1:36	-	-	-	DNF
-	Carla Moreno	Brazil (BRA)	20:37	1:33	-	-	-	DNF
-	Carole Peon	France (FRA)	21:55	1:41	-	-	-	DNF
-	Julie Dibens	Great Britain (GBR)	20:48	1:36	1:02:31	0:50	-	DNF
-	Maribel Blanco Velasco	Spain (ESP)	23:34	1:38	-	-	-	DNF
-	Lenka Zemanova	Czech Republic (CZE)	20:57	1:27	-	-	-	DNF
-	Melissa Ashton	Australia (AUS)	20:50	1:25	-	-	-	DNF
-	Nancy Alvarez	Argentina (ARG)	22:53	1:40	-	-	-	DNF
-	Fiona Docherty	New Zealand (NZL)	-	-	-	-	-	DNS
-	Maria Soledad Omar	Argentina (ARG)	-	-	-	-	-	DNS
-	Olga Generalova	Russia (RUS)	-	-	-	-	-	DNS
-	Silvia Gemignani	Italy (ITA)	-	-	-	-	-	DNS
Key : DNF - did not finish ; DNS - did not start

=== Under 23 ===
==== U23 men ====
(Top 10 only)

Rank	Athlete	Nation	Swim	T1	Bike	T2	Run	Overall time
1st place, gold medalist(s)	Brad Kahlefeldt	Australia (AUS)	18:08	1:37	58:30	1:06	32:20	1:51:41
2nd place, silver medalist(s)	Sven Riederer	Switzerland (SUI)	18:28	1:48	58:00	1:09	33:39	1:53:04
3rd place, bronze medalist(s)	Stuart Hayes	Great Britain (GBR)	18:07	1:43	58:27	1:08	33:43	1:53:08
4	Danylo Sapunov	Ukraine (UKR)	18:36	1:45	57:58	1:12	33:42	1:53:13
5	David Dellow	Australia (AUS)	18:28	1:42	58:07	1:09	34:02	1:53:28
6	Rene Goehler	Germany (GER)	18:29	1:42	58:05	1:03	34:13	1:53:32
7	Alessandro De Gasperi	Italy (ITA)	18:41	1:39	57:55	1:09	34:22	1:53:46
8	Jordi Elias Pera	Spain (ESP)	18:42	1:45	57:48	1:06	34:30	1:53:51
9	Hirokatsu Tayama	Japan (JPN)	18:07	1:50	58:22	1:11	34:28	1:53:58
10	Marko Albert	Estonia (EST)	18:06	1:44	58:28	1:13	34:37	1:54:08
Key : DNF - did not finish ; DNS - did not start

==== U23 Women ====
(Top 10 only)

Rank	Athlete	Nation	Swim	T1	Bike	T2	Run	Overall time
1st place, gold medalist(s)	Pilar Hidalgo Iglesias	Spain (ESP)	19:14	1:56	1:02:21	1:08	37:03	2:01:42
2nd place, silver medalist(s)	Mirinda Carfrae	Australia (AUS)	20:48	1:43	1:02:47	1:04	36:19	2:02:41
3rd place, bronze medalist(s)	Nicola Spirig	Switzerland (SUI)	20:42	1:48	1:02:32	1:20	36:33	2:02:55
4	Nikki Egyed	Australia (AUS)	20:47	1:41	1:02:31	1:19	37:11	2:03:29
5	Annabel Luxford	Australia (AUS)	19:16	1:52	1:02:23	1:07	39:03	2:03:41
6	Ricarda Lisk	Germany (GER)	20:39	1:44	1:02:54	1:14	37:41	2:04:12
7	Anikó Góg	Hungary (HUN)	20:53	1:54	1:02:29	1:09	38:38	2:05:03
8	Lauren Groves	Canada (CAN)	20:38	1:59	1:02:41	1:19	38:28	2:05:05
9	Josie Loane	Australia (AUS)	19:14	1:50	1:02:27	1:06	40:39	2:05:16
10	Zuriñe Rodriguez Sanchez	Spain (ESP)	20:49	1:52	1:02:38	1:16	39:34	2:06:09
Key : DNF - did not finish ; DNS - did not start

=== Junior ===
==== Junior men ====
(Top 10 only)

Rank	Athlete	Nation	Swim	T1	Bike	T2	Run	Overall time
1st place, gold medalist(s)	Terenzo Bozzone	New Zealand (NZL)	9:27	1:37	28:03	0:47	16:06	56:00
2nd place, silver medalist(s)	David Hauss	France (FRA)	9:42	1:36	27:53	0:59	15:53	56:03
3rd place, bronze medalist(s)	Tyler Butterfield	Bermuda (BER)	10:29	1:40	26:58	0:58	15:59	56:04
4	Erhard Wolfaardt	South Africa (RSA)	10:13	1:38	27:22	1:15	15:37	56:05
5	James Elvery	New Zealand (NZL)	11:09	nr	27:58	0:55	16:08	56:10
6	Andreas Giglmayr	Austria (AUT)	9:57	1:32	27:45	0:57	16:03	56:14
7	Oliver Freeman	Great Britain (GBR)	9:36	1:40	27:57	0:53	16:09	56:15
8	Charles Rusterholz	Switzerland (SUI)	9:39	1:36	27:53	0:55	16:15	56:18
9	Leonardo Chacon	Costa Rica (CRC)	9:44	nr	29:32	1:02	16:03	56:21
10	Thomas Springer	Austria (AUT)	9:46	1:37	27:44	0:53	16:28	56:28
Key : DNF - did not finish ; DNS - did not start

==== Junior Women ====
(Top 10 only)

Rank	Athlete	Nation	Swim	T1	Bike	T2	Run	Overall time
1st place, gold medalist(s)	Marion Lorblanchet	France (FRA)	10:47	1:43	30:08	1:02	17:39	1:01:19
2nd place, silver medalist(s)	Wendy De Boer	Netherlands (NED)	10:39	1:43	30:16	0:59	17:43	1:01:20
3rd place, bronze medalist(s)	Elizabeth May	Luxembourg (LUX)	10:38	1:47	30:12	1:02	18:07	1:01:46
4	Vanessa Fernandes	Portugal (POR)	10:30	1:51	30:18	1:00	18:17	1:01:56
5	Maxine Seear	Australia (AUS)	9:46	1:44	31:07	0:59	18:24	1:02:00
6	Vendula Trnkova	Czech Republic (CZE)	11:14	1:50	29:34	1:04	18:22	1:02:04
7	Jasmine Oeinck	United States (USA)	10:43	2:01	29:56	1:01	18:37	1:02:18
8	Maria Eugenia Barrera	Mexico (MEX)	10:49	1:47	30:06	1:06	18:36	1:02:24
9	Helen Jenkins	Great Britain (GBR)	10:39	1:53	30:07	1:02	18:56	1:02:37
10	Mari Rabie	South Africa (RSA)	10:37	1:46	30:17	0:58	19:11	1:02:49
Key : DNF - did not finish ; DNS - did not start
