= 2005 ITU Triathlon World Championships =

The 2005 ITU Triathlon World Championships were held in Gamagōri, Aichi (Japan) on September 10 and September 11, 2005.

== Results ==
=== Men's Championship ===
Rank	Name	Swim	Bike	Run	Time
Gold medal	Peter Robertson (AUS)	19:30	58:27	31:35	1:49:31
Silver medal	Reto Hug (SUI)	19:02	58:52	31:42	1:49:36
Bronze medal	Bradley Kahlefeldt (AUS)	19:05	58:47	31:51	1:49:44
4	Hamish Carter (NZL)	18:53	59:00	31:56	1:49:49
5	Frédéric Belaubre (FRA)	19:01	58:54	32:00	1:49:55
6	Simon Whitfield (CAN)	19:00	59:05	32:19	1:50:23
7	Cédric Fleureton (FRA)	19:04	58:51	32:37	1:50:32
8	Daniel Fontana (ITA)	19:15	58:44	32:42	1:50:40
9	Volodymyr Polikarpenko (UKR)	18:54	59:09	32:39	1:50:43
10	Samuel Pierreclaud (FRA)	19:09	58:52	32:43	1:50:44
11	Shane Reed (NZL)	19:06	58:52	32:56	1:50:55
12	Filip Ospalý (CZE)	18:55	58:58	33:07	1:51:03
13	Sven Riederer (SUI)	19:14	59:11	32:38	1:51:03
14	Maik Petzold (GER)	19:04	59:04	32:56	1:51:04
15	Greg Bennett (AUS)	19:50	58:19	32:57	1:51:06
16	Stuart Hayes (GBR)	19:10	58:45	33:19	1:51:14
17	Peter Croes (BEL)	19:57	58:09	33:09	1:51:16
18	Paulo Miyashiro (BRA)	18:54	59:07	33:17	1:51:17
19	Brent McMahon (CAN)	18:59	58:59	33:24	1:51:22
20	Andy Potts (USA)	19:04	58:56	33:23	1:51:23
21	Joe Umphenour (USA)	19:05	58:59	33:24	1:51:29
22	Csaba Kuttor (HUN)	18:52	59:15	33:30	1:51:36
23	Jan Frodeno (GER)	19:00	58:47	33:53	1:51:40
24	Virgilio De Castilho (BRA)	19:17	58:47	33:45	1:51:49
25	Raymond Lotz (NED)	18:59	59:04	33:52	1:51:55
26	José Merchan (ESP)	19:21	58:37	34:00	1:51:58
27	Terenzo Bozzone (NZL)	19:00	58:50	34:10	1:52:01
28	Junichi Yamamoto (JPN)	19:41	58:16	34:10	1:52:06
29	Andreas Raelert (GER)	18:47	59:05	34:20	1:52:12
30	Axel Zeebroek (BEL)	19:23	58:43	34:10	1:52:17
31	Igor Syssoev (RUS)	19:00	59:05	34:15	1:52:20
32	Jan Rehulá (CZE)	19:08	58:52	34:19	1:52:20
33	Andrea D'Aquino (ITA)	19:18	58:51	34:17	1:52:25
34	William Clarke (GBR)	19:05	58:59	34:35	1:52:39
35	Courtney Atkinson (AUS)	18:51	59:02	35:01	1:52:54
36	Hiroyuki Nishiuchi (JPN)	19:26	58:36	34:54	1:52:56
37	Paul Amey (GBR)	19:09	58:51	34:59	1:52:58
38	Kris Gemmell (NZL)	19:25	58:27	35:09	1:53:02
39	Dan Alterman (ISR)	19:07	59:05	34:52	1:53:05
40	Martin Krňávek (CZE)	18:55	59:07	35:07	1:53:09
41	Hunter Kemper (USA)	19:03	59:00	35:07	1:53:11
42	Ran Alterman (ISR)	19:10	59:00	35:05	1:53:15
43	Christian Weimer (GER)	19:17	58:45	35:18	1:53:20
44	Frank Bignet (FRA)	18:51	59:18	35:34	1:53:43
45	Dennis Looze (NED)	19:14	58:58	35:54	1:54:06
46	Tony Moulai (FRA)	19:16	58:43	36:14	1:54:14
47	Sebastian Dehmer (GER)	19:40	1:01:31	33:07	1:54:19
48	Hendrik de Villiers (RSA)	19:11	58:47	36:50	1:54:48
49	Hirokatsu Tayama (JPN)	19:01	59:02	37:09	1:55:12
50	Marko Albert (EST)	18:49	59:18	37:43	1:55:50
51	Yuichi Hosoda (JPN)	19:42	59:55	36:25	1:56:01
52	Richard Stannard (GBR)	18:45	59:14	40:27	1:58:26
53	Tsukasa Hirano (JPN)	18:55	59:16	40:35	1:58:47
54	Sander Berk (NED)	18:55	1:02:27	37:30	1:58:54
55	Seth Wealing (USA)	19:41	1:01:39	39:19	2:00:41
DNF	Alessandro de Gasperi (ITA)	19:49	58:10	–	–
DNF	Bevan Docherty (NZL)	19:23	58:31	–	–
DNF	Tim Don (GBR)	19:25	58:33	–	–
DNF	Mark Fretta (USA)	19:33	1:00:01	–	–
DNF	Olivier Marceau (SUI)	19:12	58:54	–	–
DNF	Silva Marques Duarte (POR)	19:28	1:01:44	–	–
DNF	Bryce Quirk (AUS)	19:28	58:28	–	–
DNF	Iván Raña (ESP)	19:41	1:01:32	–	–
DNF	Matthew Reed (USA)	19:02	58:56	–	–
DNF	Craig Alexander (AUS)	19:35	–	–	–
DNF	Dirk Bockel (LUX)	20:07	–	–	–
DNF	Didier Brocard (SUI)	19:46	–	–	–
DNF	Eligio Cervantes (MEX)	20:42	–	–	–
DNF	Antonio da Silva (BRA)	19:43	–	–	–
DNF	Marek Jaskolka (POL)	20:16	–	–	–
DNF	Andrew Johns (GBR)	19:51	–	–	–
DNF	Nasanbat Naranbat (MGL)	26:23	–	–	–
DNF	Bruno Pais (POR)	19:19	–	–	–
DNF	Stefan Perg (AUT)	20:34	–	–	–
DNF	Nathan Richmond (NZL)	18:54	–	–	–
DNF	Ryosuke Yamamoto (JPN)	20:02	–	–	–
DNS	Norbert Domnik (AUT)	–	–	–	–

=== Women's Championship ===
Rank	Name	Swim	Bike	Run	Time
Gold medal	Emma Snowsill (AUS)	19:34	1:03:30	34:57	1:58:03
Silver medal	Annabel Luxford (AUS)	19:34	1:03:27	36:40	1:59:42
Bronze medal	Laura Bennett (USA)	19:36	1:03:24	36:54	1:59:55
4	Vanessa Fernandes (POR)	20:20	1:04:49	35:08	2:00:20
5	Nadia Cortassa (ITA)	21:08	1:04:08	35:20	2:00:37
6	Felicity Abram (AUS)	21:32	1:03:38	35:54	2:01:03
7	Andrea Whitcombe (GBR)	21:28	1:03:54	36:00	2:01:08
8	Liz Blatchford (GBR)	20:18	1:04:56	36:00	2:01:15
9	Samantha McGlone (CAN)	21:23	1:03:49	36:05	2:01:18
10	Michelle Dillon (GBR)	21:25	1:03:51	36:11	2:01:28
11	Anja Dittmer (GER)	21:04	1:04:15	36:24	2:01:43
12	Sheila Taormina (USA)	19:32	1:03:31	38:54	2:01:59
13	Kiyomi Niwata (JPN)	21:06	1:04:08	36:52	2:02:07
14	Joanna Zeiger (USA)	19:35	1:05:44	36:52	2:02:12
15	Carole Peon (FRA)	21:09	1:04:02	37:04	2:02:15
16	Samantha Warriner (NZL)	20:22	1:04:53	37:21	2:02:37
17	Mariana Ohata (BRA)	20:23	1:04:49	37:25	2:02:39
18	Ai Ueda (JPN)	21:33	1:03:47	37:21	2:02:42
19	Debbie Tanner (NZL)	21:19	1:03:54	37:37	2:02:52
20	Ainhoa Murúa (ESP)	20:24	1:04:53	37:46	2:03:04
21	Magali Di Marco-Messmer (SUI)	20:25	1:04:48	37:55	2:03:08
22	Virginie Jouvé (FRA)	21:27	1:03:51	37:51	2:03:12
23	Evelyn Williamson (NZL)	21:27	1:03:47	38:00	2:03:16
24	Christiane Pilz (GER)	21:27	1:03:54	37:53	2:03:17
25	Gillian Kornell (CAN)	21:22	1:03:54	38:20	2:03:36
26	Barbara Lindquist (USA)	19:34	1:03:30	40:35	2:03:41
27	Susan Williams (USA)	21:07	1:04:12	38:26	2:03:45
28	Machiko Nakanishi (JPN)	21:31	1:03:47	38:34	2:03:54
29	Silvia Gemignani (ITA)	19:37	1:05:41	38:51	2:04:11
30	Carla Moreno (BRA)	20:33	1:04:46	39:09	2:04:29
31	Mirinda Carfrae (AUS)	21:31	1:03:42	39:30	2:04:43
32	Helen Tucker (GBR)	20:30	1:04:48	39:49	2:05:08
33	Sandra Soldan (BRA)	20:15	1:05:09	39:49	2:05:14
34	Becky Lavelle (USA)	19:38	1:05:43	40:02	2:05:25
35	Lenka Radová (CZE)	20:26	1:04:53	40:34	2:05:55
36	Eva Dollinger (AUT)	21:26	1:03:51	40:48	2:06:07
37	Carolyn Murray (CAN)	21:32	1:06:42	37:59	2:06:13
38	Ayesha Rollinson (CAN)	21:34	1:03:54	40:54	2:06:23
39	Joelle Franzmann (GER)	20:04	1:05:09	41:28	2:06:43
40	Shizuka Kutsuna (JPN)	20:25	1:07:56	38:53	2:07:13
41	Lauren Groves (CAN)	21:22	1:06:53	39:12	2:07:31
42	Helen Lawrence (GBR)	21:31	1:09:00	39:43	2:10:14
43	Merja Kiviranta (FIN)	21:50	1:08:38	40:05	2:10:37
DNF	Ana Burgos (ESP)	21:35	1:03:49	–	–
DNF	Leanda Cave (GBR)	20:09	1:05:04	–	–
DNF	Nicole Hackett (AUS)	20:07	1:05:15	–	–
DNF	Tara Ross (CAN)	20:30	1:07:59	–	–
DNF	Akiko Sekine (JPN)	21:30	1:03:49	–	–
DNS	Shanelle Barrett (NZL)	–	–	–	–
DNS	Renata Berková (CZE)	–	–	–	–
DNS	Megumi Shigaki (JPN)	–	–	–	–
