= Triathlon at the 2004 Summer Olympics – Men's =

Men's Triathlon at the Games of the XXVIII Olympiad
- Venue: Vouliagmeni Olympic Centre
- Date: 26 August
- Competitors: 50 from 26 nations
- Winning time: 1:51:07.73

Medalists
| 1st place, gold medalist(s) | | Hamish Carter | New Zealand |
| 2nd place, silver medalist(s) | | Bevan Docherty | New Zealand |
| 3rd place, bronze medalist(s) | | Sven Riederer | Switzerland |

The men's triathlon was part of the Triathlon at the 2004 Summer Olympics programme. It was the second appearance of the event, which was established in 2000. The competition was held on Thursday, August 26, 2004 at the Vouliagmeni Olympic Centre in Athens. Fifty triathletes from 26 nations competed.

== Competition format ==
The race was held over the "international distance" (also called "Olympic distance") and consisted of 1,500 metres (0.93 mi) swimming, 40 kilometres (25 mi), road cycling, and 10 kilometres (6.2 mi) road running.

== Results ==
| Rank | # | Triathlete | Country | Swimming | Cycling | Running | Total time | Difference |
|---|---|---|---|---|---|---|---|---|
| 1st place, gold medalist(s) | 28 | Hamish Carter | New Zealand | 18:19 | 1:00:44 | 32:04 | 1:51:07.73 | — |
| 2nd place, silver medalist(s) | 27 | Bevan Docherty | New Zealand | 18:13 | 1:00:51 | 32:11 | 1:51:15.60 | +0:07.87 |
| 3rd place, bronze medalist(s) | 48 | Sven Riederer | Switzerland | 18:17 | 1:00:45 | 32:31 | 1:51:33.26 | +0:25.53 |
| 4 | 24 | Greg Bennett | Australia | 18:19 | 1:01:29 | 31:53 | 1:51:41.58 | +0:33.85 |
| 5 | 50 | Frédéric Belaubre | France | 18:04 | 1:00:58 | 32:58 | 1:52:00.53 | +0:52.80 |
| 6 | 15 | Andreas Raelert | Germany | 18:07 | 1:01:40 | 32:48 | 1:52:35.62 | +1:27.89 |
| 7 | 6 | Rasmus Henning | Denmark | 18:19 | 1:01:29 | 32:49 | 1:52:37.32 | +1:29.59 |
| 8 | 46 | Olivier Marceau | Switzerland | 18:18 | 1:00:46 | 33:40 | 1:52:44.36 | +1:36.63 |
| 9 | 8 | Hunter Kemper | United States | 18:11 | 1:02:43 | 31:52 | 1:52:46.33 | +1:38.60 |
| 10 | 26 | Simon Thompson | Australia | 18:19 | 1:02:34 | 31:54 | 1:52:47.18 | +1:39.45 |
| 11 | 16 | Simon Whitfield | Canada | 18:21 | 1:02:35 | 32:19 | 1:53:15.81 | +2:08.08 |
| 12 | 51 | Carl Blasco | France | 18:06 | 1:01:43 | 33:31 | 1:53:20.16 | +2:12.43 |
| 13 | 34 | Hirokatsu Tayama | Japan | 18:03 | 1:01:43 | 33:42 | 1:53:28.41 | +2:20.68 |
| 14 | 49 | Stephane Poulat | France | 18:04 | 1:01:43 | 34:04 | 1:53:51.35 | +2:43.62 |
| 15 | 41 | Igor Sysoyev | Russia | 18:00 | 1:02:55 | 32:56 | 1:53:51.37 | +2:43.64 |
| 16 | 43 | Andrew Johns | Great Britain | 18:11 | 1:00:53 | 35:11 | 1:54:15.87 | +3:08.14 |
| 17 | 21 | Daniil Sapunov | Kazakhstan | 18:14 | 1:02:41 | 33:38 | 1:54:33.15 | +3:25.42 |
| 18 | 44 | Tim Don | Great Britain | 18:07 | 1:01:40 | 34:55 | 1:54:42.13 | +3:34.40 |
| 19 | 14 | Maik Petzold | Germany | 18:17 | 1:02:36 | 33:57 | 1:54:50.92 | +3:43.19 |
| 20 | 31 | Eneko Llanos | Spain | 18:18 | 1:02:36 | 33:58 | 1:54:52.37 | +3:44.64 |
| 21 | 22 | Marko Albert | Estonia | 18:01 | 1:01:48 | 35:37 | 1:55:26.59 | +4:18.86 |
| 22 | 9 | Andy Potts | United States | 17:49 | 1:03:05 | 34:42 | 1:55:36.47 | +4:28.74 |
| 23 | 30 | Iván Raña | Spain | 18:08 | 1:02:46 | 34:50 | 1:55:44.27 | +4:36.54 |
| 24 | 25 | Peter Robertson | Australia | 18:16 | 1:01:33 | 35:55 | 1:55:44.36 | +4:36.63 |
| 25 | 20 | Dmitriy Gaag | Kazakhstan | 18:29 | 1:05:23 | 32:36 | 1:56:28.97 | +5:21.24 |
| 26 | 12 | Sebastian Dehmer | Germany | 18:23 | 1:05:31 | 33:08 | 1:57:02.88 | +5:55.15 |
| 27 | 10 | Victor Plata | United States | 18:16 | 1:05:41 | 33:12 | 1:57:09.09 | +6:01.36 |
| 28 | 10 | Daniel Fontana | Argentina | 18:25 | 1:05:30 | 33:19 | 1:57:14.20 | +6:06.47 |
| 29 | 36 | Filip Ospalý | Czech Republic | 18:23 | 1:05:32 | 33:22 | 1:57:17.58 | +6:09.85 |
| 30 | 37 | Volodymyr Polikarpenko | Ukraine | 18:03 | 1:05:53 | 33:43 | 1:57:39.28 | +6:31.55 |
| 31 | 3 | Leandro Macedo | Brazil | 18:25 | 1:05:30 | 33:44 | 1:57:39.36 | +6:31.63 |
| 32 | 33 | Hiroyuki Nishiuchi | Japan | 18:20 | 1:05:34 | 33:49 | 1:57:43.51 | +6:35.78 |
| 33 | 29 | Nathan Richmond | New Zealand | 18:04 | 1:02:51 | 37:06 | 1:58:01.94 | +6:54.21 |
| 34 | 5 | Paulo Miyashiro | Brazil | 17:57 | 1:05:59 | 34:20 | 1:58:16.76 | +7:09.03 |
| 35 | 2 | Tyler Butterfield | Bermuda | 19:34 | 1:04:20 | 34:32 | 1:58:26.99 | +7:19.26 |
| 36 | 18 | Gilberto González | Venezuela | 18:24 | 1:05:29 | 35:19 | 1:59:12.20 | +8:04.47 |
| 37 | 42 | Norbert Domnik | Austria | 19:34 | 1:04:19 | 35:20 | 1:59:13.25 | +8:05.52 |
| 38 | 40 | Eligio Cervantes | Mexico | 18:44 | 1:05:12 | 35:31 | 1:59:27.81 | +8:20.08 |
| 39 | 17 | Brent McMahon | Canada | 18:30 | 1:05:25 | 35:49 | 1:59:44.57 | +8:36.84 |
| 40 | 47 | Reto Hug | Switzerland | 18:19 | 1:05:37 | 37:44 | 2:01:40.43 | +10:32.70 |
| 41 | 4 | Juraci Moreira | Brazil | 18:27 | 1:09:37 | 34:31 | 2:02:35.99 | +11:28.26 |
| 42 | 35 | Martin Krňávek | Czech Republic | 18:19 | 1:05:37 | 38:58 | 2:02:54.59 | +11:46.86 |
| 43 | 1 | Daniel Lee | Hong Kong | 18:17 | 1:05:38 | 39:35 | 2:03:30.39 | +12:22.66 |
| 44 | 39 | Javier Rosas | Mexico | 18:43 | 1:09:21 | 35:59 | 2:04:03.97 | +12:56.24 |
| 45 | 45 | Marc Jenkins | Great Britain | 18:15 | 1:08:51 | 38:27 | 2:05:33.60 | +14:25.87 |
| — | 32 | Xavier Llobet | Spain | 18:15 | 1:05:44 | Did not finish | | |
| — | 38 | Andriy Glushchenko | Ukraine | 18:05 | Did not finish | | | |
| — | 11 | Vassilis Krommidas | Greece | 18:20 | Did not finish | | | |
| — | 23 | Conrad Stoltz | South Africa | 19:35 | Did not finish | | | |
| — | 7 | Csaba Kuttor | Hungary | Did not start | | | | |

- * Including Transition 1 (swimming-to-cycling) and T2 (cycling-to-running), roughly a minute.
- No one is allotted the number 13.
- LAP - Lapped by the leader on the cycling course.
