= Royal Windsor Triathlon =

Annual race in the UK

- Date: Annually in June
- Location: Windsor, Berkshire, England
- Event type: Triathlon
- Established: 1991
- Organizer: RunThrough
- Website: https://www.royalwindsortriathlon.co.uk/

The Royal Windsor Triathlon is an annual Triathlon event held in Windsor, Berkshire, England. First organised in 1991, it is considered one of the United Kingdom's longest-running triathlons. The event takes place each June and features sprint and Olympic triathlon races.

The triathlon includes an out-and-back swim in the River Thames, an open-road cycling route passing Windsor Castle, and a multi-lap run through Windsor Great Park and along the Long Walk.

The event has attracted elite triathletes and amateur participants alike, typically drawing around 3,000–3,500 competitors. It has also hosted notable figures from other sports, including Jonny Wilkinson, Tanni Grey-Thompson, Gareth Thomas, and Jenson Button, as well as Princess Beatrice of York.

Previously organised by Human Race (now A.S.O UK), the Royal Windsor Triathlon has been delivered by RunThrough since 2025, following a management transition and a new partnership with Japanese performance Sportswear brand Descente.

== History ==
The first Royal Windsor Triathlon was held in 1991, organised by Human Race (now A.S.O UK). Since its launch, the event has grown to become one of the longest-running triathlons in the UK.

The triathlon has been awarded the British Triathlon Federation's "Event of the Year" seven times. The 2020 edition was cancelled due to the COVID-19 pandemic, as confirmed by the organisers. Similarly, the 2021 event did not take place, with entries automatically deferred to 2022.[10] The triathlon resumed in 2022 with over 3,500 participants, returning as a sell-out race.

In 2025, the event transitioned to new organisers, RunThrough, as part of the company's GW Active portfolio, and announced a new partnership with Japanese performance sportswear brand Descente.

== Course ==
As of 2025, the Royal Windsor Triathlon offers both sprint and Olympic distance races, as well as relay team options. The course is centred around Windsor and features several historic landmarks, including Windsor Castle, the River Thames, and the Long Run.

=== Swim ===
The race begins east of Queen Elizabeth Bridge on the River Thames and follows an out-and-back route passing Baths Island. The sprint distance covers 750 metres, while the Olympic distance covers 1,500 metres.

=== Bike ===
Following the swim, athletes transition to an open-road cycling segment through Windsor and the surrounding Berkshire countryside. The sprint course covers 22 kilometres and follows a single loop, while the Olympic course extends to 40 kilometres. The Olympic route shares the same initial section as the sprint course before branching off into a longer outer segment through additional countryside roads before returning to Windsor.

=== Run ===
The run section takes participants into Windsor Great Park and along the Long Walk, offering views of Windsor Castle. The sprint run covers 5 kilometres and consists of two laps of a shorter loop, while the Olympic run covers 10 kilometres over three laps.

== Past winners ==
=== Olympic Triathlon (1991–2025) ===
Edition	Year	Men's winner	Time (h:m:s)	Women's winner	Time (h:m:s)
1st	1991	Spencer Smith	-	Sarah Coope	-
2nd	1992	Spencer Smith	-	Alison Hamilton	-
3rd	1993	Colin Dixon	-	Rachel Hamilton	-
4th	1994	Steve Burton	-	Alison Hamilton	-
5th	1995	Spencer Smith	-	Loretta Sollars	-
6th	1996	Richard Hobson	-	Sian Brice	-
7th	1997	Spencer Smith	01:52:52	Sian Brice	02:08:34
8th	1998	Spencer Smith	01:52:40	Beth Thompson	02:09:15
9th	1999	Spencer Smith	01:51:30	Sian Brice	02:05:17
10th	2000	Tim Dos	-	Sian Brice	-
11th	2001	Andrew Johns	-	Andrea Whitcombe	-
12th	2002	Richard Allen	-	Heather Williams	-
13th	2003	Dermot Galea	-	Jodie Swallow	-
14th	2004	Andrew Johns	-	Julie Dibens	-
15th	2005	Andrew Johns	01:51:16	Liz Blatchford	02:04:49
16th	2006	Tim Don	-	Helen Tucker	-
17th	2007	Richard Stannard	01:54:43	Sam Herridge	02:11:55
18th	2008	Richard Stannard	-	Andrea Whitcombe	-
19th	2009	Stuart Hayes	01:52:14	Jodie Stimpson	02:03:21
20th	2010	Steve Worthington	-	Vanessa Raw	-
21st	2011	Tom Bishop	-	Lois Rosindale	-
22nd	2012	Tim Don	01:36:51 (Note: The 2012 event was run as a duathlon due to unsafe swim conditions in the River Thames.)	Jacqui Slack	01:50:47
23rd	2013	Tom Bishop	01:49:47	Emma Pallant	02:09:09
24th	2014	Mark Buckingham	01:49:15	Emma Pallant	02:03:43
25th	2015	Stuart Hayes	01:56:22	Sarah Lewis	2:14:56
26th	2016	Stuart Hayes	01:54:28	Emma Pallant	02:06:06
27th	2017	Thomas Davis	1:57:10	Emma Pallant	2:06:49
28th	2018	James Ellison	02:09:03	Olivia Matthews	2:21:26
29th	2019	Zachary Pywell	02:07:03	Anel Meyer	02:25:08
30th	2022	Ben Hinchliffe	02:05:59	Jordan Matthews	02:20:04
31st	2023	James Louter	02:18:16	Rebecca Read	02:31:16
32nd	2024	Rory Strachan	01:58:35	Megan Blake	02:16:20
33rd	2025	Patrick Elwood	02:06:48	Alice Sullivan	02:20:45

Official times for winners prior to 2012 are largely unavailable due to incomplete digital records. Winner names from 1991–2011 are taken from the Royal Windsor Triathlon Wall of Fame. Verified finishing times are included where accessible.

== Records ==
The following are the current course records for the Olympic-distance event.

Times from 2012 are excluded, as the event was run as a duathlon due to unsafe swim conditions in the River Thames.

=== Men's Olympic Triathlon ===
Year	Athlete	Time (h:m:s)
2014	Mark Buckingham	01:49:15

=== Women's Olympic Triathlon ===
Year	Athlete	Time (h:m:s)
2014	Emma Pallant	02:03:43

== Controversies ==
=== Horse–cyclist collision (2018) ===
During the 28th Royal Windsor Triathlon on 17 June 2018, a cyclist collided with a horse and rider on the open-road bike course. The incident was captured on helmet-mounted camera and circulated widely online, showing the cyclist riding too close, touching the horse's stirrup, and causing the animal to rear. This resulted in a bruised ankle for the rider and a missing horseshoe.

The race organisers, Human Race, issued a public apology and launched an internal review. They stated they had identified two individuals responsible, although their identities were withheld due to ongoing police investigations. One cyclist received a lifetime ban from Human Race events, and another athlete, who came forward voluntarily, was given a 12-month ban.

=== River Thames water quality concerns (2024) ===
During the 32nd Royal Windsor Triathlon on 9 June 2024, at least 35 competitors reported falling severely ill after completing the swimming leg in the River Thames. Affected participants sought medical treatment in hospitals.

Race organisers Human Race responded by stating that the river water had been tested in the weeks leading up to the event and again on race day, and that all tests were within British Triathlon Federation safety standards.

Thames Water, the utility company, cautioned against assigning blame solely to its operations. It highlighted that river health can be affected by multiple factors, including agricultural runoff, wildlife, and road drainage. The company also noted that its nearest sewage treatment plant in Slough had not discharged since early April.
