= 2009 ITU Long Distance Triathlon World Championships =

International sports competition

ITU Long Distance Triathlon World Championships
- Location: Perth, Western Australia, Australia
- Date: October 25 2009

Champions
- Men: Timothy O'Donnell (United States)
- Women: Jodie Swallow (United Kingdom)

The 2009 ITU Long Distance Triathlon World Championships was a triathlon competition held in Perth, Western Australia in Australia on October 25 2009 and organized by the International Triathlon Union, now World Triathlon. This was the 16th edition of the competition inaugurated in 1994.

The Elite races for men and women consisted of a 3 km (1.9 mi) swim, 80 km (50 mi) bike and 20 km (12 mi) run, longer than the standard 1.5 km swim, 40 km bike and 10 km run associated with the World Triathlon Championship Series and the Olympic Games, but shorter than the classic Ironman Triathlon event.

The race distance of 103 kilometres (64 miles) was identical to the distance in the 2007 event, and with it, the joint shortest course in the history of the competition.

In addition to the elite professional races, a series of age-group amateur championships was also held.

== Medal Summary ==
Event	Gold		Silver		Bronze	
Men	Timothy O'Donnell; United States	3:48:15	Sylvain Sudrie; France	3:49:22	Martin Jensen ^{(de)} Denmark	3:49:33
Women	Jodie Swallow; Great Britain	4:07:38	Rebekah Keat; Australia	4:18:49	Delphine Pelletier; France	4:19:27

== Results ==
The following are the results of the elite races:

=== Men ===
28 athletes completed the course, from a total of 30 starters. In a relatively close race, American Timothy O'Donnell took the title ahead of French athlete Sylvain Sudrie, creating his 67 second winning margin over the run leg.

Rank	Athlete	Nation	Swim	T1	Bike	T2	Run	Overall time
1st place, gold medalist(s)	Timothy O'Donnell	United States (USA)	40:10	1:10	1:53:37	1:15	1:12:00	3:48:15
2nd place, silver medalist(s)	Sylvain Sudrie	France (FRA)	40:05	1:20	1:53:27	1:21	1:13:05	3:49:22
3rd place, bronze medalist(s)	Martin Jensen ^{(de)}	Denmark (DEN)	40:08	1:21	1:53:47	1:27	1:12:48	3:49:33
4	Jan Rehula	Czech Republic (CZE)	40:17	1:20	1:53:41	1:22	1:13:43	3:50:25
5	Paul Ambrose	Australia (AUS)	40:11	1:14	1:52:20	1:10	1:15:39	3:50:38
6	Francois Chabaud	France (FRA)	43:34	1:23	1:54:01	1:20	1:10:51	3:51:12
7	Leon Griffin	Australia (AUS)	41:10	1:10	1:55:40	1:15	1:13:40	3:52:57
8	Julien Loy	France (FRA)	40:15	1:20	2:00:10	1:37	1:11:15	3:54:40
9	Kieran Doe	New Zealand (NZL)	38:10	1:21	1:54:23	1:21	1:21:31	3:56:49
10	Clayton Fettell	Australia (AUS)	38:08	1:16	1:54:29	1:20	1:21:40	3:56:56
11	Clemente Alonso McKernan	Spain (ESP)	40:13	1:24	1:56:28	1:34	1:18:38	3:58:21
12	Aaron Farlow	Australia (AUS)	41:21	1:24	1:59:15	1:30	1:16:44	4:00:18
13	Paul Matthews	Australia (AUS)	39:57	1:16	1:59:00	1:22	1:19:16	4:00:53
14	Duncan Milne	New Zealand (NZL)	45:23	1:38	1:58:01	1:30	1:14:59	4:01:35
15	Liam Scopes	New Zealand (NZL)	43:35	1:27	2:03:43	1:12	1:12:39	4:02:39
16	Guilherme Manocchio	Brazil (BRA)	43:36	1:30	2:00:36	1:26	1:15:50	4:03:01
17	Hervé Banti	Monaco (MON)	43:33	1:24	2:00:47	1:27	1:16:17	4:03:32
18	Sean O'Neill	Australia (AUS)	43:34	1:20	2:00:51	1:22	1:17:41	4:04:51
19	Axel Zeebroek	Belgium (BEL)	40:14	1:24	1:55:40	1:19	1:28:12	4:06:52
20	Jason Crowther	Australia (AUS)	43:37	1:21	2:00:44	1:23	1:20:07	4:07:15
21	Kevin Clark	Hong Kong (HKG)	43:38	1:29	2:04:39	1:21	1:17:23	4:08:34
22	Ben Hoffman	United States (USA)	48:23	1:35	1:58:07	1:34	1:22:08	4:11:50
23	Petr Vabrousek	Czech Republic (CZE)	47:17	1:37	2:01:58	1:36	1:21:27	4:13:57
24	Daiki Masuda	Japan (JPN)	48:14	1:49	2:06:22	1:24	1:22:13	4:20:06
25	Jim Lubinski	United States (USA)	54:10	1:30	2:05:00	1:15	1:27:01	4:28:59
26	Adam Jensen	United States (USA)	58:24	1:40	2:00:36	1:24	1:28:18	4:30:23
27	Phillipe Van Der Leeuw	South Africa (RSA)	56:01	1:39	2:09:36	1:40	1:27:23	4:36:21
28	Paul Westwood	New Zealand (NZL)	50:39	1:41	2:06:42	1:34	1:46:21	4:47:01
-	Marcel Zamora Pérez	Spain (ESP)	43:34	1:24	2:00:42	1:33	-	DNF
-	Simon Thompson	Australia (AUS)	40:10	1:19	-	-	-	DNF
Key : DNF - did not finish ; DNS - did not start

=== Women ===
21 women began the race, of whom 19 completed the course.

For the fourth year in succession, the winner was a Briton, and for the fourth time, a new winner as Jodie Swallow led the field home in dominant fashion in 4 hours, 7 minutes and 38 seconds, a lead of over 11 minutes from silver medalist Rebekah Keat. Swallow won 'gun to tape' solo, and was fastest in all three legs, and both transitions. Swallow's solo dominance was described as having "ripped the field to pieces" in Triathlete magazine.

Rank	Athlete	Nation	Swim	T1	Bike	T2	Run	Overall time
1st place, gold medalist(s)	Jodie Swallow	Great Britain (GBR)	41:47	1:21	2:04:54	1:15	1:18:18	4:07:38
2nd place, silver medalist(s)	Rebekah Keat	Australia (AUS)	46:39	1:27	2:07:41	1:21	1:21:36	4:18:49
3rd place, bronze medalist(s)	Delphine Pelletier	France (FRA)	46:14	1:27	2:08:10	1:27	1:22:06	4:19:27
4	Sibylle Matter Bruegger	Switzerland (SUI)	45:41	1:27	2:08:40	1:27	1:24:24	4:21:43
5	Lucie Zelenkova	Czech Republic (CZE)	44:36	1:51	2:09:24	1:24	1:29:29	4:26:48
6	Amelia Pearson	Australia (AUS)	46:40	1:30	2:07:44	1:24	1:30:57	4:28:20
7	Lisa Marangon	Australia (AUS)	46:16	1:36	2:08:01	1:37	1:33:04	4:30:37
8	Merja Kiviranta	Finland (FIN)	47:35	1:29	2:15:06	1:44	1:25:13	4:31:10
9	Pip Taylor	Australia (AUS)	42:36	1:27	2:16:53	1:35	1:29:20	4:31:55
10	Rebecca Witinok- Huber	United States (USA)	46:14	1:35	2:11:29	1:24	1:32:32	4:33:18
11	Melissa Vandewater	Australia (AUS)	48:57	1:32	2:12:33	1:42	1:29:50	4:34:36
12	Eva Janssen	Netherlands (NED)	51:43	1:32	2:16:50	1:23	1:24:59	4:36:30
13	Charlotte McShane	Australia (AUS)	50:38	1:38	2:15:35	1:33	1:31:58	4:41:25
14	Susana Santos	Brazil (BRA)	55:44	2:01	2:17:39	1:50	1:25:56	4:43:13
15	Jolene Wilkinson	United States (USA)	58:24	1:38	2:13:40	1:30	1:28:08	4:43:22
16	Riana De Lange	South Africa (RSA)	50:56	1:40	2:17:59	1:46	1:34:00	4:46:23
17	Annie Warner	United States (USA)	46:52	1:27	2:18:53	1:27	1:38:51	4:47:35
18	Fiorella D'Croz	Colombia (COL)	49:26	1:48	2:25:28	1:38	1:29:39	4:48:04
19	Saki Kubota	Japan (JPN)	54:22	2:05	2:30:50	1:39	1:39:46	5:08:44
-	Amy Kloner	United States (USA)	59:50	1:58	-	-	-	DNF
Key : DNF - did not finish ; DNS - did not start

== Age-group championships ==
A series of age-group amateur championships were also held as part of the event. The medalists of those events are listed below.

Event	Gold		Silver		Bronze	
Men
18-19	Paulo Roberto Maciel; Brazil	4:39:11	Elliott Wise; Australia	4:53:21	Pavel Hotar; Czech Republic	5:13:57
20-24	Mark Bowstead; New Zealand	4:09:38	Matthew Bailey; Australia	4:11:55	Steve Richard; United States	4:16:26
25-29	Rob Creasy; New Zealand	4:09:58	Brynt Mcswain; Australia	4:15:42	Daniel Plews; Great Britain	4:17:27
30-34	Troy Drinan; Australia	4:06:46	Nathan Fitzakerley; Australia	4:07:14	Todd Israel; Great Britain	4:12:54
35-39	Shane Vincent; New Zealand	4:18:47	Neil Mendum; Australia	4:19:23	Charlie Low; Great Britain	4:22:00
40-44	Matthew Wolstencroft; Australia	4:12:29	Bradley Hosking; Australia	4:13:28	Holger Beckmann; United States	4:28:55
45-49	Walter Thorburn; New Zealand	4:18:44	Stephen Farrell; New Zealand	4:22:35	Gregory Ball; New Zealand	4:25:21
50-54	Kevin Fergusson; Australia	4:19:43	Frank McShane; Australia	4:42:43	Robert Caune; Australia	4:46:09
55-59	Chris Kiley; Australia	5:00:13	Werner Stebler; Switzerland	5:05:09	Graham Plews; Great Britain	5:06:21
60-64	Brian Barr; Australia	4:59:30	Mike Sandford; Great Britain	5:17:41	Graham Crocker; Australia	5:23:55
65-69	Greg Sandkuhl; Canada	5:11:29	Roger Little; United States	5:59:26	Trevor Skewes; Australia	6:19:48
70-74	David Lewington; Great Britain	6:16:29	Neil Fleming; New Zealand	6:47:20	John Holman; United States	7:12:31
75-79	Peter Howard; Great Britain	7:48:17				
Women
18-19	Abigail Thornton; United States	5:55:08	Patricia Aguiar; Brazil	6:20:47		
20-24	Annika Edmondson; New Zealand	5:00:08	Caitlin Bridgland; Australia	5:16:30	Anna Lorimer; New Zealand	5:19:02
25-29	Carrie Lester; Australia	4:23:25	Michelle Simpson; New Zealand	4:38:59	Jasmin Dillon; Australia	4:41:45
30-34	Christelle Van Niekerk; Australia	4:34:44	Belinda Harper; New Zealand	4:38:04	Jacinda Papps; New Zealand	4:45:00
35-39	Beverley Thomas; Great Britain	4:41:37	Janine Willis; Canada	4:56:12	Christine Hemphill; Australia	4:59:28
40-44	Linda O'Connor; Australia	4:42:11	Helen Roach; Australia	4:45:21	Angela Clarke; Australia	4:48:02
45-49	Loretta Wesley; Australia	4:51:12	Julie Foster; Australia	5:09:24	Kerry Bailie; Australia	5:12:50
50-54	Judyann Cummings; United States	5:00:01	Nancy Cullen; Australia	5:11:18	Robyn Scott; Australia	5:12:17
55-59	Cheryl Ogden; Australia	5:24:24	Sue Jones; New Zealand	5:40:59	Helen Freer; Australia	5:59:03
60-64	Barbara Kostner; United States	7:16:16				
