= 2010 ITU Long Distance Triathlon World Championships =

International sports competition

World Long Distance Triathlon Championships
- Location: Immenstadt, Germany
- Date: July 31, 2010

Champions
- Men: Sylvain Sudrie (France)
- Women: Caroline Steffen (Switzerland)

The 2010 ITU Long Distance Triathlon World Championships was a triathlon competition held in Immenstadt in Germany on July 31, 2010, and organized by the International Triathlon Union, now World Triathlon. This was the 17th edition of the competition inaugurated in 1994.

The Elite races for men and women consisted of a 4 km (2.5 mi) swim, 130 km (81 mi) bike and 30 km (19 mi) run, longer than the standard 1.5 km swim, 40 km bike and 10 km run associated with the World Triathlon Championship Series and the Olympic Games, but shorter than the classic Ironman Triathlon event.

== Medal Summary ==
Event	Gold		Silver		Bronze	
Men	Sylvain Sudrie ^{(fr)} France	6:24:57	Timothy O'Donnell; United States	6:29:35	François Chabaud ^{(fr)} France	6:32:04
Women	Caroline Steffen; Switzerland	6:55:21	Yvonne Van Vlerken; Netherlands	7:07:04	Virginia Berasategi; Spain	7:13:19

== Results ==
The following are the results of the elite races:

=== Men ===
43 athletes started the men's race, of whom 34 completed the course. The race was won by a little under five minutes by the 2029 silver medalist, Frenchman Sylvain Sudrie, reversing the order from the previous year as the reigning champion, Timothy O'Donnell of the United States could only finish in silver.

Rank	Athlete	Nation	Swim	T1	Bike	T2	Run	Overall time
1st place, gold medalist(s)	Sylvain Sudrie	France	48:36	2:36	3:35:59	1:20	1:56:26	6:24:57
2nd place, silver medalist(s)	Timothy O'Donnell	United States	48:41	1:47	3:41:19	1:13	1:56:35	6:29:35
3rd place, bronze medalist(s)	Francois Chabaud	France	53:52	2:30	3:34:27	1:31	1:59:44	6:32:04
4	Jonas Djurback	Sweden	48:46	2:04	3:39:57	1:11	2:00:34	6:32:32
5	Konstantin Bachor	Germany	52:48	1:57	3:34:00	1:13	2:03:03	6:33:01
6	Jimmy Johnsen	Denmark	54:08	2:12	3:40:14	1:10	1:57:30	6:35:14
7	Viktor Zemtsev	Ukraine	53:58	2:05	3:46:17	1:10	1:53:12	6:36:42
8	Esben Hovgaard	Denmark	53:58	2:28	3:39:48	1:23	1:59:11	6:36:48
9	Rasmus Stubager	Denmark	48:42	2:09	3:41:24	1:11	2:05:20	6:38:46
10	Olivier Marceau	Switzerland	52:53	1:55	3:40:37	1:38	2:03:27	6:40:30
11	Matteo Annovazzi	Italy	54:03	2:07	3:42:52	1:31	2:03:31	6:44:04
12	Pedro Gomes	Portugal	53:45	2:11	3:50:37	1:37	1:56:09	6:44:19
13	Guilherme Manocchio	Brazil	52:56	2:12	3:51:27	1:43	1:57:15	6:45:33
14	Hervé Faure	France	53:59	2:45	3:47:17	1:34	2:00:53	6:46:28
15	Fredrik Croneborg	Sweden	55:52	3:10	3:47:01	1:24	1:59:22	6:46:49
16	Sander Berk	Netherlands	48:45	1:57	3:55:59	1:47	1:58:26	6:46:54
17	Petr Soukup	Czech Republic	53:50	2:04	3:50:39	1:26	2:02:52	6:50:51
18	Tuukka Miettinen	Finland	59:37	2:03	3:42:26	1:13	2:07:27	6:52:46
19	Petr Vabrousek	Czech Republic	59:38	2:22	3:45:57	1:33	2:04:06	6:53:36
20	Andrej Vistica	Croatia	54:00	2:08	3:48:23	1:43	2:09:46	6:56:00
21	Leonardo Simoncini	Italy	55:55	2:09	3:56:17	1:22	2:02:22	6:58:05
22	Hideo Fukui	Japan	48:42	2:07	3:55:02	1:45	2:11:18	6:58:54
23	Karl-Johan Danielsson	Sweden	52:51	2:06	3:45:15	1:27	2:18:49	7:00:28
24	Justin Hurd	United States	1:00:07	2:32	3:53:31	1:40	2:07:23	7:05:13
25	Norbert Domnik	Austria	55:53	2:06	3:56:18	1:47	2:09:21	7:05:25
26	Roeland Smits	Netherlands	55:48	2:18	4:00:01	1:26	2:07:02	7:06:35
27	Stefano Paoli	Italy	55:50	2:10	3:42:07	2:07	2:28:43	7:10:57
28	Rudolf Cogan	Czech Republic	1:05:32	2:16	4:00:13	1:22	2:10:06	7:19:29
29	Eric Hung	Hong Kong	1:05:18	3:02	3:59:58	2:03	2:16:50	7:27:11
30	Yu Shinozaki	Japan	1:00:26	2:15	4:01:32	1:39	2:22:27	7:28:19
31	Teemu Lemmettyla	Finland	59:51	2:27	4:16:22	1:31	2:08:58	7:29:09
32	Adam Jensen	United States	1:03:11	2:17	3:59:00	1:48	2:27:22	7:33:38
33	Masayuki Matsumaru	Japan	1:00:10	2:26	4:14:49	2:38	3:15:40	8:35:43
34	Marcos Sarquis Hallack Gomes	Brazil	54:07	2:16	5:13:47	2:35	2:28:30	8:41:15
-	Raynard Tissink	South Africa	53:54	2:11	3:42:09	1:46	-	DNF
-	Rasmus Ahlfors	Denmark	55:48	2:17	3:44:51	1:44	-	DNF
-	Rob Creasy	New Zealand	53:56	2:19	4:03:06	1:40	-	DNF
-	Stephane Poulat	France	48:33	2:43	3:35:52	1:27	-	DNF
-	Massimo Cigana	Italy	55:55	2:03	3:40:31	1:15	-	DNF
-	Peru Alfaro San Ildefonso	Spain	48:43	2:02	-	-	-	DNF
-	Buddy Green	Canada	48:36	2:15	-	-	-	DNF
-	Martin Jensen	Denmark	48:40	1:57	-	-	-	DNF
-	Joe Umphenour	United States	48:34	1:57	-	-	-	DNF
Key : DNF - did not finish ; DNS - did not start

=== Women ===
17 women took the starters line with fifteen completing the course. Great Britain's four year run of dominance was ended as the field was led home by Swiss athlete Caroline Steffen, who won the event by over eleven minutes, one of the largest winning margins in the events history following a strong swim and a dominant bike leg. Yvonne van Vlerken's leading run leg failed to meaningful close the gap on Steffen, but secured the Dutchwoman a silver medal.

Rank	Athlete	Nation	Swim	T1	Bike	T2	Run	Overall time
1st place, gold medalist(s)	Caroline Steffen	Switzerland	54:01	2:20	3:48:00	1:15	2:09:45	6:55:21
2nd place, silver medalist(s)	Yvonne Van Vlerken	Netherlands	1:00:33	2:17	3:55:15	1:22	2:07:37	7:07:04
3rd place, bronze medalist(s)	Virginia Berasategi Luna	Spain	54:04	2:17	3:55:47	1:16	2:19:55	7:13:19
4	Anja Ippach	Germany	54:02	2:05	4:24:41	1:42	2:20:14	7:42:44
5	Tamara Kozulina	Ukraine	1:08:16	2:29	4:13:48	1:36	2:19:06	7:45:15
6	Súsanna Skylv Sørensen	Denmark	1:00:38	2:41	4:17:34	1:22	2:29:21	7:51:36
7	Ewa Bugdol	Poland	55:58	2:32	4:35:39	1:43	2:18:59	7:54:51
8	Haley Cooper	United States	1:03:16	2:41	4:25:21	1:25	2:24:12	7:56:55
9	Lisa Ribes	United States	1:14:41	2:45	4:20:48	1:34	2:18:32	7:58:20
10	Bettina Zelenka	Austria	1:08:39	2:42	4:17:17	2:22	2:30:41	8:01:41
11	Susana Santos	Brazil	1:08:21	3:03	4:25:43	2:04	2:31:41	8:10:52
12	Julia Grant	New Zealand	1:05:47	3:06	4:29:04	1:27	2:44:28	8:23:52
13	Zeljka Milicic	Croatia	1:00:18	2:44	4:59:55	2:40	2:41:46	8:47:23
14	Iva Tomic	Croatia	1:05:43	3:27	5:11:52	2:11	3:05:23	9:28:36
15	Rachel Sears Casanta	United States	1:17:37	3:45	4:57:12	2:32	3:12:17	9:33:23
-	Erika Csomor	Hungary	1:00:33	2:55	-	-	-	DNF
-	Delphine Pelletier	France	54:09	2:26	-	-	-	DNF
Key : DNF - did not finish ; DNS - did not start

== Age group championships ==
A series of age-group amateur championship races was also held. The winners of each classification are listed below:

Class	Male		Female	
Class	Athlete	Overall time	Athlete	Overall time
70–74	Gerhard Niessner (GER)	9:40:07		
65–69	Peter Stallknecht (GER)	8:55:55		
60–64	Theo Baumann (GER)	8:00:27	Senna S. Madsen (DEN)	10:46:20
55–59	Hartmut Andres (GER)	8:30:14	Edith Kowalski (GER)	9:46:49
50–54	Reto Schawalder (SUI)	7:15:25	Christiane Hofmann (SUI)	8:44:51
45–49	Lu Decurtins (SUI)	7:13:40	Ali Hollington (NZL)	8:00:34
40–44	Georg Anstett (GER)	7:01:49	Christine Hemphill (AUS)	8:15:13
35–39	Thomas Vonach (AUT)	7:06:52	Jana Candrova (CZE)	7:37:01
30–34	Stephan Bergermann (GER)	7:01:33	Joyce Wolfe (IRL)	8:09:42
25–29	Michael Wetzel (GER)	6:50:03	Katrin Esefeld (GER)	7:47:42
20–24	Maximilien Von Berg (BEL)	7:25:47	Vanessa Pereira (POR)	9:11:19
