= 2012 ITU Long Distance Triathlon World Championships =

International sports competition

World Long Distance Triathlon Championships
- Location: Vitoria-Gasteiz, Spain
- Date: July 29 2012
- Competitors: 48 (30 men, 8 women)

Champions
- Men: Chris McCormack (Australia)
- Women: Caroline Steffen (Switzerland)

The 2012 ITU Long Distance Triathlon World Championships was a triathlon competition held in Vitoria-Gasteiz in Spain on July 29 2012 and organized by the International Triathlon Union, now World Triathlon. The Elite races for men and consisted of a 4 km (2.5 mi) swim, 120 km (75 mi) bike and 30 km (19 mi) run, longer than the standard 1.5 km swim, 40 km bike and 10 km run associated with the World Triathlon Championship Series and the Olympic Games, but shorter than the classic Ironman Triathlon event.

== Medal Summary ==
Event	Gold		Silver		Bronze	
Men	Chris McCormack; Australia	5:29:47	Eneko Llanos; Spain	5:31:39	Dirk Bockel; Luxembourg	5:34:54
Women	Caroline Steffen; Switzerland	6:04:17	Camilla Pedersen; Denmark	6:09:23	Jodie Swallow; Great Britain	6:12:48

== Results ==
The following are the results of the elite races:

=== Men ===
30 Athletes took to the water, of whom 25 completed the course, led home by Australia's Chris McCormack.

Rank	Athlete	Nation	Swim	T1	Bike	T2	Run	Overall time
1st place, gold medalist(s)	Chris McCormack	Australia	53:37	1:19	2:48:54	1:03	1:44:55	5:29:47
2nd place, silver medalist(s)	Eneko Llanos	Spain	51:44	1:41	2:48:59	0:56	1:48:18	5:31:39
3rd place, bronze medalist(s)	Dirk Bockel	Luxembourg	51:25	1:22	2:49:39	0:56	1:51:32	5:34:54
4	Emil Dalgaard	Denmark	49:49	1:16	2:49:57	1:02	1:56:37	5:38:39
5	Martin Krnavek	Czech Republic	49:58	1:23	2:50:45	1:04	2:01:37	5:44:47
6	Viktor Zemtsev	Ukraine	56:47	1:39	2:58:42	1:08	1:47:34	5:45:49
7	Nikolay Yaroshenko	Russia	52:26	1:34	2:50:28	0:56	2:00:59	5:46:23
8	Duarte Silva Marques	Portugal	49:52	1:18	3:03:54	1:07	1:54:43	5:50:51
9	Pedro Miguel Reig Jover	Spain	50:55	1:41	3:02:11	1:03	1:56:23	5:52:11
10	Miquel Blanchart	Spain	53:27	1:25	3:04:15	1:10	1:52:25	5:52:42
11	Raul Amatriain Arraiza	Spain	1:01:19	1:25	2:59:44	1:00	1:50:01	5:53:27
12	Jarmo Hast	Finland	53:35	1:29	3:04:03	1:07	1:53:22	5:53:35
13	José Estrangeiro	Portugal	56:45	1:44	3:03:44	1:23	1:51:03	5:54:38
14	Anton Blokhin	Ukraine	53:33	1:28	2:59:42	1:29	1:59:20	5:55:30
15	Petr Vabrousek	Czech Republic	59:05	1:51	3:01:18	1:28	1:53:22	5:57:03
16	Thiago Vinhal	Brazil	53:39	1:51	3:14:15	1:25	1:53:05	6:04:15
17	Nazariy Dorosh	Ukraine	53:29	1:30	3:08:06	1:23	2:00:03	6:04:30
18	Andrej Vistica	Croatia	1:01:21	1:42	3:00:42	1:15	2:00:23	6:05:20
19	Mikel Elgezabal Fernandez	Spain	53:45	1:27	2:53:01	1:40	2:17:42	6:07:33
20	Richard Calle Martinez	Spain	53:37	1:14	3:03:41	1:19	2:07:43	6:07:33
21	Hayato Kawahara	Japan	59:00	1:44	3:12:59	1:23	1:55:55	6:11:00
22	Viktor Aloshyn	Russia	53:32	1:25	3:13:34	1:08	2:03:02	6:12:39
23	Yu Shinozaki	Japan	1:05:40	1:30	3:01:55	1:09	2:12:08	6:22:21
24	Gerhard De Bruin	South Africa	1:02:41	1:45	3:09:41	1:16	2:09:30	6:24:50
25	Felipe Manente	Brazil	1:01:17	1:46	3:05:29	1:46	2:19:59	6:30:15
-	James Cunnama	South Africa	56:47	1:36	2:54:23	1:06	-	DNF
-	Sylvain Sudrie	France	50:58	1:22	2:50:07	1:06	-	DNF
-	Alberto Casadei	Italy	49:55	1:17	-	-	-	DNF
-	Hervé Faure	France	58:54	4:25	-	-	-	DNF
-	Daiki Masuda	Japan	1:01:18	1:28	-	-	-	DNF
Key : DNF - did not finish ; DNS - did not start

=== Women ===
18 athletes both began and competed the race, with Switzerland's Caroline Steffen winning her second world long-distance title.

Rank	Athlete	Nation	Swim	T1	Bike	T2	Run	Overall time
1st place, gold medalist(s)	Caroline Steffen	Switzerland	55:58	1:29	3:01:27	1:17	2:04:08	6:04:17
2nd place, silver medalist(s)	Camilla Pedersen	Denmark	55:46	1:33	3:07:36	1:08	2:03:21	6:09:23
3rd place, bronze medalist(s)	Jodie Swallow	Great Britain	53:32	1:27	3:05:43	1:02	2:11:07	6:12:48
4	Virginia Berasategi Luna	Spain	1:01:02	1:48	3:14:09	1:04	2:02:34	6:20:36
5	Maider Gaztañaga Dorronsoro	Spain	57:54	2:08	3:14:37	1:43	2:07:31	6:23:52
6	Ewa Bugdol	Poland	57:55	1:42	3:15:26	1:25	2:08:17	6:24:46
7	Jeanne Collonge	France	1:03:06	2:01	3:18:46	1:36	2:09:48	6:35:15
8	Olesya Prystayko	Ukraine	1:05:09	1:30	3:18:20	1:12	2:11:15	6:37:23
9	Gurutze Frades Larralde	Spain	1:09:32	1:37	3:22:04	1:22	2:11:03	6:45:38
10	Estefania Gomez Villanueva	Spain	1:04:38	1:41	3:26:52	1:23	2:12:40	6:47:13
11	Natasha Gorie	South Africa	1:04:54	1:58	3:19:17	1:28	2:21:59	6:49:35
12	Heidi Sessner	Germany	1:03:06	1:37	3:20:21	1:21	2:24:09	6:50:34
13	Gillian Clayton	Canada	1:15:53	1:46	3:22:16	1:35	2:09:54	6:51:22
14	Vanessa Pereira	Portugal	1:07:57	1:57	3:24:33	1:42	2:17:06	6:53:14
15	Merja Kiviranta	Finland	1:02:58	1:37	3:18:23	1:34	2:34:16	6:58:46
16	Natasha Yaremczuk	Canada	1:04:57	1:52	3:45:38	3:15	2:16:36	7:12:18
17	Caroline Koll	South Africa	1:04:43	1:44	3:36:00	1:40	2:29:35	7:13:40
18	Yasuko Miyazaki	Japan	1:05:07	2:06	3:35:21	1:49	2:41:09	7:25:30
Key : DNF - did not finish ; DNS - did not start

=== Age-group and paratriathlon championships ===
In addition to the elite races, a series of championships for age-group amateur athletes and para triathletes was also held as part of the championships. The champions of each classification are listed below.

Paratriathlon

Classification	Athlete	Nation	Overall time
Para Triathlon Male TRI-6	Moises Osuna (B2)	Spain	8:53:26
Para Triathlon Male TRI-5	Mikel Garmendia	Spain	8:14:47
Para Triathlon Male TRI-4	Juan Antonio Rodriguez Gomez	Spain	7:20:14
Para Triathlon Male TRI-3	Diego Velazquez Rodriguez	Spain	6:54:27
Para Triathlon Male TRI-2	Christian Troger	Austria	9:33:27
Para Triathlon Male TRI-1	Jörg Walden	Germany	8:24:59

Age-group

Age group	Athlete	Nation	Overall time
70-74 Male	Eli Iwens	Belgium	8:34:10
65-69 Male	Anton Hergouth	Austria	8:47:12
65-69 Female	Tiare Lund	New Zealand	9:00:42
60-64 Male	Yves Tabarant	France	6:45:13
60-64 Female	Cristina Milton	Great Britain	8:33:51
55-59 Male	Pedro Oviedo Montoya	Spain	6:31:00
55-59 Female	Jan-Maree Brown	New Zealand	8:43:03
50-54 Male	Reto Schawalder	Switzerland	6:19:06
50-54 Female	Vivienne Williams	South Africa	7:08:54
45-49 Male	Preben Jacobsen	Denmark	6:12:02
45-49 Female	Ali Hollington	New Zealand	6:55:44
40-44 Male	David Slavinski	United States	6:09:23
40-44 Female	Tracy Cook	Great Britain	6:45:00
35-39 Male	Sergio Dias	Portugal	6:09:13
35-39 Female	Jolene Wilkinson	United States	6:50:35
30-34 Male	Rob Creasy	New Zealand	6:05:19
30-34 Female	Ruth Brito Curbelo	Spain	6:57:49
25-29 Male	Henrik Hyldelund	Denmark	6:01:08
25-29 Female	Catherine Faux	Great Britain	6:42:17
20-24 Male	Marc Hurtado Sabater	Spain	6:23:17
20-24 Female	Amelia Watkinson	New Zealand	7:07:41
18-19 Male	Jesse Taing	United States	7:54:00
