= 2016 ITU Long Distance Triathlon World Championships =

International sports competition

World Long Distance Triathlon Championships
- Location: Oklahoma City, United States
- Date: 24 September 2016

The 2016 ITU Long Distance Triathlon World Championships was a triathlon competition held in Oklahoma City in the United States on 24 September 2016 and organized by the International Triathlon Union, now World Triathlon. The Elite races for men and consisted of a 4 km (2.5 mi) swim, 120 km (75 mi) bike and 30 km (19 mi) run for a combined distance of 154 km (96 mi), longer than the standard 1.5 km swim, 40 km bike and 10 km run associated with the World Triathlon Championship Series and the Olympic Games, but shorter than the classic Ironman Triathlon event.

== Medal Summary ==
Event	Gold		Silver		Bronze	
Men	Sylvain Sudrie ^{(fr)} France	5:59:46	Cyril Viennot ^{(fr)} France	6:02:11	Matt Chrabot; United States	6:06:13
Women	Jodie Swallow; Great Britain	6:37:11	Caroline Steffen; Switzerland	6:44:40	Rachel McBride; Canada	6:56:05

== Results ==
The following are the results of the elite races:

=== Men ===
Sylvain Sudrie of France won a second world title, ahead of compatriot Cyril Viennot.

Rank	Athlete	Swim	T1	Bike	T2	Run	Overall time
1st place, gold medalist(s)	Sylvain Sudrie (FRA)	57:03	0:39	2:57:53	0:49	2:03:23	5:59:46
2nd place, silver medalist(s)	Cyril Viennot (FRA)	1:05:07	0:57	2:55:00	1:08	2:00:01	6:02:11
3rd place, bronze medalist(s)	Matt Chrabot (USA)	1:00:14	0:53	3:03:47	1:13	2:00:08	6:06:13
4	Giulio Molinari (ITA)	59:53	1:03	2:59:46	0:42	2:06:00	6:07:22
5	Cody Beals (CAN)	1:08:06	0:46	2:58:07	0:45	2:00:35	6:08:17
6	Craig Alexander (AUS)	59:59	0:49	3:04:58	1:00	2:06:14	6:12:57
7	Miguel Angel Fidalgo (ESP)	59:58	-	-	-	2:07:41	6:14:38
8	Samuel Betten (AUS)	57:02	0:55	3:03:27	0:40	2:13:00	6:15:01
9	Davide Giardini (USA)	56:47	0:57	3:02:23	0:41	2:21:41	6:22:28
10	Dylan Mcneice (NZL)	56:47	0:51	3:05:33	1:10	2:18:24	6:22:42
11	Paul Ambrose (AUS)	1:05:53	0:47	3:00:23	0:54	2:15:04	6:22:59
12	Taylor Reid (CAN)	1:06:43	0:49	3:05:43	0:41	2:09:45	6:23:39
13	Ivan Kalashnikov (RUS)	59:55	0:52	3:25:10	0:47	2:05:31	6:32:14
14	Jarrod Shoemaker (USA)	1:00:04	1:02	3:28:04	0:50	2:05:19	6:35:17
15	Sean Donnelly (GER)	59:53	0:57	3:05:00	0:57	2:34:00	6:40:45
16	Elliot Holtham (CAN)	1:06:31	0:45	3:10:58	1:06	2:28:07	6:47:24
17	Kuniaki Takahama (JPN)	1:03:32	0:56	3:46:30	0:55	2:10:12	7:02:02
18	Rafael Ribeiro Goncalves (BRA)	56:47	1:05	3:15:35	1:03	2:50:50	7:05:06
19	Natham Killam (CAN)	1:17:39	0:45	3:10:15	1:00	2:39:33	7:09:11
20	Elmar Heger (GER)	1:10:59	1:04	3:15:07	2:10	2:45:13	7:14:31
21	Nikolay Yaroshenko (RUS)	59:55	0:48	3:25:26	1:21	2:55:35	7:23:02
22	Shigenobu Ikegata (JPN)	1:09:06	0:47	3:32:36	1:08	2:46:45	7:30:19
23	Noriyuki Akiba (JPN)	1:17:58	1:07	3:43:07	1:43	2:32:37	7:36:29
24	Hector Fonseca (CRC)	1:37:52	0:48	3:41:05	1:04	2:36:04	7:56:49
-	Filip Ospaly (CZE)	59:50	0:43	3:12:46	1:09	-	DNF
-	Lachlan Kerin (AUS)	1:02:44	0:53	3:05:00	1:07	-	DNF
-	Alberto Casadei (ITA)	1:03:35	0:54	3:41:22	-	-	DNF
-	Antoine Jolicoeur-Desroches (CAN)	1:02:52	0:38	-	-	-	DNF
-	George Bjälkemo (SWE)	1:18:10	1:04	-	-	-	DNF
-	Denis Sketako (SLO)	1:13:12	0:52	-	-	-	DNF
-	Robert Duncan (USA)	1:53:32	-	-	-	-	DNF
Key : DNF - did not finish ; DNS - did not start

=== Women ===
Britain's Jodie Swallow won her second ITU world title, and third in total (including the Ironman 70.3 world title in 2010) with a dominant win of over seven minutes.

Rank	Athlete	Swim	T1	Bike	T2	Run	Time
1st place, gold medalist(s)	Jodie Swallow (GBR)	1:03:31	1:00	3:15:50	1:00	2:15:52	6:37:11
2nd place, silver medalist(s)	Caroline Steffen (SUI)	1:05:58	0:54	3:17:46	0:56	2:19:08	6:44:40
3rd place, bronze medalist(s)	Rachel McBride (CAN)	1:15:34	1:39	3:19:48	0:59	2:18:07	6:56:05
4	Annie Thorén (SWE)	1:05:03	0:52	3:18:15	1:01	2:33:55	6:59:05
5	Emily Cocks (USA)	1:13:35	0:46	3:31:06	0:59	2:13:18	6:59:43
6	Kelly Williamson (USA)	1:14:06	0:58	3:39:36	1:05	2:09:22	7:05:06
7	Lesley Smith (USA)	1:21:00	1:16	3:31:37	1:22	2:12:05	7:07:17
8	Skye Moench (USA)	1:21:00	1:06	3:26:47	1:37	2:20:23	7:10:52
9	Catherine Jameson (GBR)	1:04:34	1:00	3:21:34	0:58	2:53:43	7:21:47
10	Maria Pujol (ESP)	1:11:21	0:53	3:44:29	1:03	2:29:13	7:26:57
11	Hanna Maksimava (BLR)	1:19:49	0:47	3:44:26	0:57	2:25:07	7:31:04
12	Jenny Fletcher (CAN)	1:20:58	1:24	3:37:33	1:11	2:39:45	7:40:48
13	Lauren Capone (USA)	1:16:47	1:55	4:09:12	1:13	2:25:18	7:54:23
14	Isabelle Rouleau (CAN)	1:20:37	1:04	4:01:17	2:00	2:33:38	7:58:34
15	Kathy Rakel (USA)	1:17:54	0:58	3:33:13	1:12	3:11:26	8:04:40
-	Jennifer Spieldenner (USA)	1:03:36	0:56	3:26:12	0:58	-	DNF
-	Amanda Stevens (USA)	1:05:08	0:49	-	-	-	DNF
Key : DNF - did not finish ; DNS - did not start

== Para triathlon and age group championships ==
In addition to the two elite races, a series of paratriathlon and age group championships were also contested. The winners of each classification is listed below:

Classification	Name	Nation	Overall time
18-19 Male AG	Jessy Grant	Australia	7:24:06
20-24 Female AG	Jess Barnes	New Zealand	8:27:47
20-24 Male AG	Julian Beuchert	Germany	6:30:32
25-29 Female AG	Victoria Kline	United States	8:38:07
25-29 Male AG	Zachary Miller	United States	7:28:29
30-34 Female AG	Claudia Smith	United States	7:56:47
30-34 Male AG	Ken-Ichi Hino	United States	7:01:49
35-39 Female AG	Kirsten Sass	United States	7:24:09
35-39 Male AG	Kevin Nickel	United States	7:19:43
40-44 Female AG	Sarah Bell	United States	8:24:26
40-44 Male AG	Tim Hola	United States	6:46:18
45-49 Female AG	Julie Howle	Australia	8:22:31
45-49 Male AG	Patrice Brisindi	Canada	7:01:31
50-54 Female AG	Melissa Dowell	Great Britain	8:01:38
50-54 Male AG	Pierre Heynemand	Canada	7:05:11
55-59 Female AG	Ellen Hart	United States	8:36:32
55-59 Male AG	Lee Walther	United States	7:35:57
60-64 Female AG	Lin Sanders	United States	10:50:39
60-64 Male AG	David Patten	Great Britain	8:15:27
65-69 Female AG	Shirley Jean Rolston	New Zealand	11:53:46
65-69 Male AG	Michael Orendorff	United States	8:52:16
Women's PT4	Maria Huche	Denmark	13:05:43
