= Kiviranta =

Kiviranta is a surname. Notable people with the surname include:

- Esko Kiviranta (born 1950), Finnish politician
- Joel Kiviranta (born 1996), Finnish ice hockey player
- Merja Kiviranta (born 1977), Finnish cyclist
- Nette Kiviranta (born 2001), Finnish para-alpine skier
