= Generalov =

Generalov (Russian: Генералов) is a Russian masculine surname. Its feminine counterpart is Generalova. Notable people with the surname include:

- Olga Generalova (born 1972), Russian triathlete
- Vasily Generalov (1867–1887), Russian revolutionary
- Yegor Generalov (born 1993), Russian football player
