= Helen Lawrence =

Helen Lawrence may refer to:

- Helen Lawrence (opera singer), British opera singer
- Helen Lawrence (triathlete), see 2005 ITU Triathlon World Championships

fictional characters

- Helen Graham (The Tenant of Wildfell Hall), character in The Tenant of Wildfell Hall
- Helen Lawrence, character in Helen's Babies (film)

creative works

- Helen Lawrence, a 2014 play by Vancouver writer Chris Haddock and artist Stan Douglas
