= Vanessa Raw =

English artist

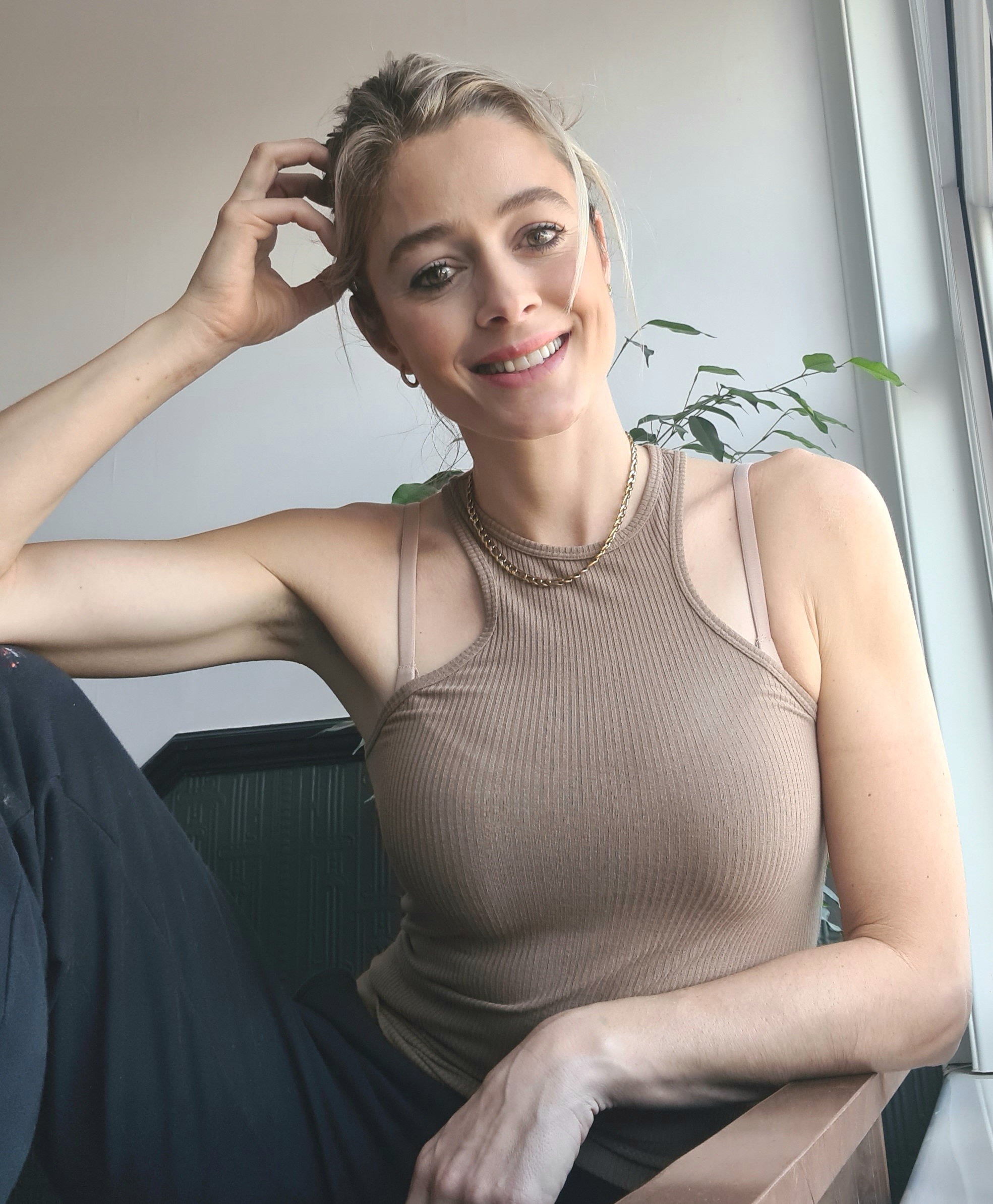
- Raw in Ramsgate, 2022
- Born: 1984 (age 41–42); Hexham, England
- Education: Newcastle College; (Foundation); Loughborough University
- Website: vanessaraw.co.uk

Vanessa Raw (born 1984 in Hexham) is a British artist and former professional triathlete.

Raw had a successful 11-year career as a triathlete and achieved eight top-ten positions and three medals across 26 World Triathlon races.

== Education and triathlon ==
In an interview with Winsor & Newton, Raw claimed to have started painting at around age 6 or 7. Raw did a foundation course at Newcastle College before enrolling at Loughborough University. During her time at the university, she became involved in triathlon racing in 2005. In 2009, she completed her BA in fine art.

Raw had a successful 11-year career as a triathlete and achieved eight top-ten positions and three medals across 26 World Triathlon races. She then achieved four medals in long distance (ironman) events before retiring in 2016 after years of struggling with injury. She has won the British Elite Duathlon Championships, Royal Windsor Triathlon and Ironman 70.3 Italy. She obtained a bronze medal in the 2015 ETU Middle Distance Triathlon Championships and consistently represented Great Britain as a leading contender in World Cup and World Triathlon Series races.

== Artwork ==
Raw describes herself as an expressionist/'expressive colourist', with a figurative element. She describes her landscapes as self-portraits, and has stated that she is not 'overly concerned with realism' and that she likes to work with the 'physicality of paint'. She cites Lucian Freud, Jenny Saville, Egon Schiele, Gustav Klimt and Marlene Dumas as influences for portraiture, and J. M. W. Turner and Vincent van Gogh as influences for landscapes.

Some of her works, known as 'psychological landscapes', have been described as an exploration of phantoms, encompassing elements such as dreams, individuals, and locations. Her work attempts to the interplay between the present, the hidden subconscious, and the spaces that lie in between.

== Exhibitions ==
In 2021–22, she held a solo show in Margate, displaying ‘I Dreamed I Touched the Land You See’, which involved abstract dreamscapes.

In September 2022, Raw's artworks depicting the nude female body were displayed at an exhibition called “Behind Closed Doors” at Berlin Art Week.

In 2023, Raw was one of the artists selected for the Artist-to-Artist initiative at the Frieze Art Fair. She was proposed by renowned artist Tracey Emin for a solo exhibition at the fair. Her paintings on display were both an exploration of issues surrounding the male vs the female gaze, sexual identity, and desire, as well as a personal journey of self-discovery.

Raw's artwork has been displayed in multiple art galleries in London and Margate, including at the Fitzrovia Gallery, the Flowers Gallery, and the Woolff Gallery.
