= Timothy O'Donnell (triathlete) =

American triathlete (born 1980)

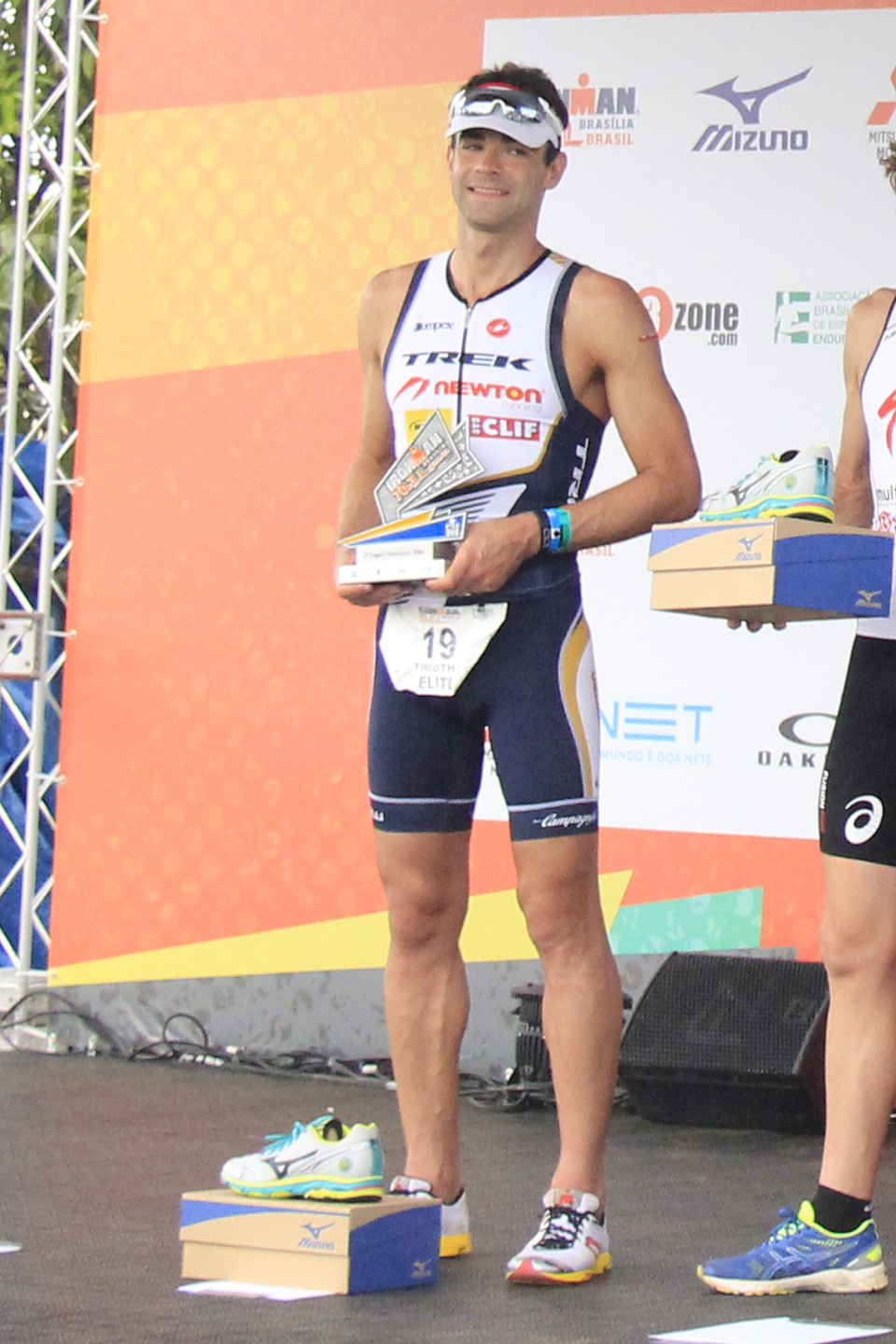
- Tim O'Donnell at 2014 Ironman 70.3 Brasil

Personal information
- Born: October 1, 1980 (age 45) Shavertown, Pennsylvania, U.S.
- Height: 5 ft 11 1/2 in (1.82 m)
- Weight: 165 lb (75 kg)
- Spouse: Mirinda Carfrae

Sport
- Country: United States
- Turned pro: 2003
- Coached by: Julie Dibens
Medal record
Men's triathlon
Representing United States
ITU Long Distance World Championships
Gold medal – first place	2009 Perth	Elite
Silver medal – second place	2010 Immenstadt	Elite
Ironman World Championship
Silver medal – second place	2019	Individual
Bronze medal – third place	2015	Individual
Ironman 70.3 World Championships
Bronze medal – third place	2010 Clearwater	Individual

Timothy O'Donnell (born October 1, 1980) is an American long-distance triathlete. He won the 2009 ITU Long Distance Triathlon World Championships, placed third at the 2015 Ironman World Championship, and was second at the 2019 Ironman World Championship.

== Career ==
O'Donnell was originally a swimmer who began competing in triathlon on the advice of his brother while at the United States Naval Academy. In 2013, O'Donnell won Ironman Brazil with a time 8:01:32. He was 5th at the 2013 Ironman World Championship and was the first American to cross the line. In 2014 O'Donnell announced that he had begun working with Mark Allen in preparation for the 2014 Ironman World Championship. He experienced a disappointing finish at the championship when he experienced stomach pain and walked during the marathon. He finished third in the 2015 Ironman World Championship, where he completed the bike leg behind winner Jan Frodeno, before eventually being overtaken on the run by Andreas Raelert.

In March 2021, O'Donnell suffered a heart attack while competing in the Miami Challenge triathlon. He received a stent and was approved to return to light training weeks later. A year later in May 2022, he returned to racing at the Ironman 70.3 Chattanooga: North American 70.3 Championship placing 6th overall. The next month O'Donnell took 3rd place at Ironman Des Moines to qualify for the Ironman World Championship.

O'Donnell serves on the athlete board as co-President of the Professional Triathletes Organisation.

== Personal life ==
O'Donnell married fellow triathlete Mirinda Carfrae in 2013. They have three children and reside in Boulder, Colorado.
