= Marek Jaskółka =

Polish triathlete

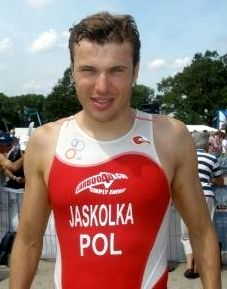

Personal information
- Born: 19 April 1976 (age 50) Ruda Śląska, Poland

Sport
- Sport: Triathlon

Marek Jaskółka (born 19 April 1976) is a Polish triathlete. He competed at the 2008 and 2012 Summer Olympics.
