= Michelle Dillon =

British triathlete

Medal record

Representing Great Britain

Women's triathlon

ITU Triathlon World Championships
Bronze medal – third place	2002 Cancún	Individual

ITU Duathlon World Championships
Gold medal – first place	2005 Newcastle	Individual
Silver medal – second place	2007 Győr	Individual

45-49F ITU World Triathlon Championship
Gold medal – first place	2018 Gold Coast	Individual
Gold medal – first place	2019 Lausanne	Individual

50-54F WT World Triathlon Championship
Gold medal – first place	2023 Hamburg	Individual
Gold medal – first place	2024 Torremolinos	Individual

Michelle Dillon (born 24 May 1973 in Wembley, England) is a retired British triathlete.

Dillon's first Olympic triathlon was at the 2000 Summer Olympics. She was one of the three British athletes, along with Sian Brice and Andrew Johns, not to finish the competition. Four years later, at the 2004 Summer Olympics, Dillon finished in sixth place with a time of 2:06:00.77.

Before turning to the triathlon, she was a runner, competing for Australia at the 1994 Commonwealth Games.

Michelle has been a coach for many triathletes including Stuart Hayes and Emma Pallant. She returned to competitive sport on 3 April 2016 coming second in the British Duathlon Championships. In 2018 she became 45-49F World Triathlon Champion on the Gold Coast.

== Selected results ==
- 2000 Summer Olympics: DNF
- 2004 Summer Olympics: 6th, 2:06:00.77
- 2007 Győr ITU World Duathlon Championships: 2nd, 1:54:43
