= Sian Brice =

British triathlete

Sian Brice (born 2 April 1969) is a triathlete from the United Kingdom.

She was born in Leigh, Greater Manchester.

Brice competed at the first Olympic triathlon at the 2000 Summer Olympics. She was one of the three British athletes, along with Michelle Dillon and Andrew Johns, not to finish the competition. Before she went to the Olympics she already had a bronze medal under her belt from the European Triathlon Championships, she also came sixth in the World Championships behind 5 Aussies.
