= Simon Agoston =

Hungarian-born triathlete from Austria

Personal information
- Born: 5 April 1977 (age 49) Békéscsaba, Hungary
- Height: 1.79 m (5 ft 10 in)
- Weight: 64 kg (141 lb)

Sport
- Country: Austria
- Team: Asics RLS Endless Sports

Simon Agoston (born 5 April 1977) is a Hungarian-born triathlete from Austria, who competed at the 2008 Summer Olympics in Beijing. Agoston started out his triathlon career in 1995, and has participated in over fifty competitions in Europe. His best result came at the 2000 Triathlon World University Championships in Tiszaújváros, Hungary, where he finished strongly in second place. At the Olympics, Agoston placed thirty-eighth in the men's triathlon with a time of 1:53:23, just five minutes behind the winner.
