= Tsukasa Hirano =

Japanese triathlete

Personal information
- Born: 28 April 1983 (age 43) Osaka, Japan
- Height: 1.71 m (5 ft 7 in)
- Weight: 65 kg (143 lb)

Sport
- Country: Japan
- Sport: Triathlon
- Turned pro: 2001
Medal record
Men's triathlon
Representing Japan
U23 Asia Cup
Bronze medal – third place	2001	Triathlon
Japan Cup
Gold medal – first place	2005	Triathlon
Asia Cup
Gold medal – first place	2010	Triathlon

Tsukasa Hirano (Japanese: 平野司, born 28 April 1983 in Osaka) is a Japanese triathlete. He has represented Japan in ITU world cup from 2001 to 2011. He won several triathlon races through domestic and international races such as 2005 Japan Cup and the 2010 Asia Cup Philippines. After he retired from professional sports in 2012, he became the head coach for the NAS triathlon club.
