= Pilar Hidalgo =

Spanish triathlete (born 1979)

Pilar Hidalgo Iglesias (born 3 May 1979 in Cee, A Coruña) is a female athlete from Spain, who competes in triathlon.

Hidalgo competed at the second Olympic triathlon at the 2004 Summer Olympics. She took thirteenth place with a total time of 2:07:37.34.
