= Carolyn Murray =

Canadian triathlete

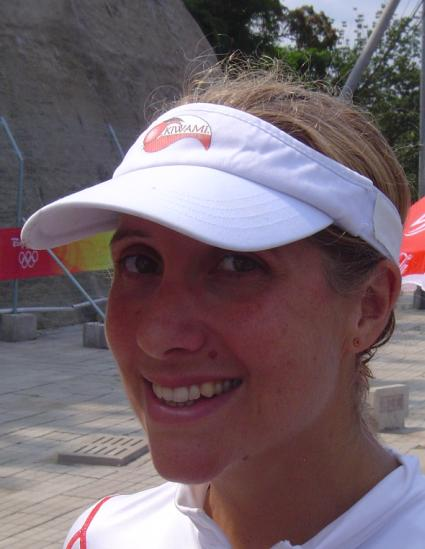
Murray at the 2008 Summer Olympics

Carolyn Murray (born September 18, 1976) is a Canadian triathlete who competed in the 2008 Summer Olympics.

She was born in St. Albert, Alberta. She is an alumna of Simon Fraser University.

In 2008, she finished 29th in the Olympic triathlon event and was the top female Canadian. Her mother Laurie Murray is also a world class triathlete and continues to compete in the 60 plus category ranking 3rd in the world.

Carolyn Murray lives in Victoria, BC and coaches future Olympic triathletes.
