= Jodie Swallow =

British triathlete

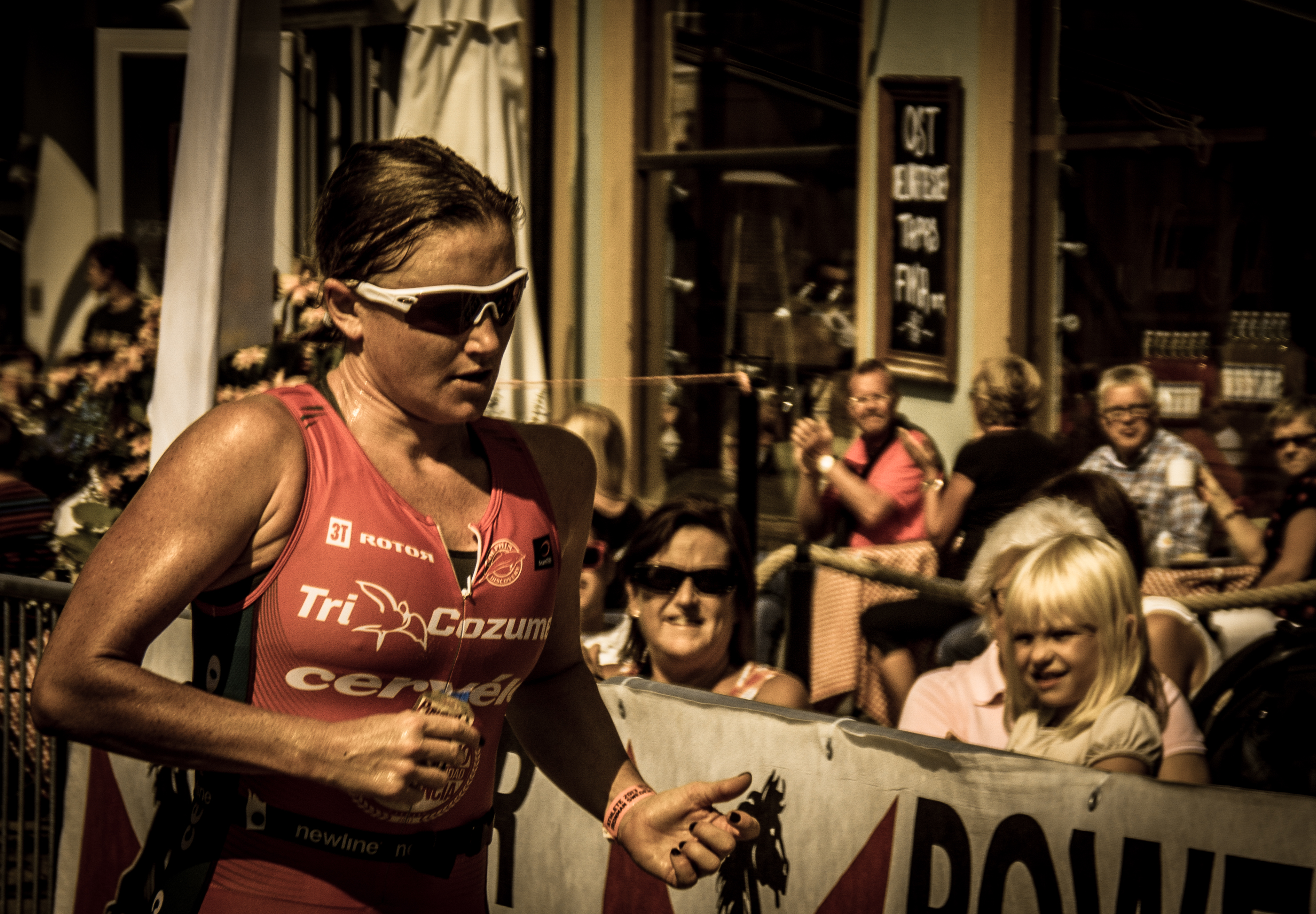

Personal information
- Born: 23 June 1981 (age 45) Brentwood, Essex
- Height: 5 ft 8 in (1.73 m)
- Weight: 64 kg (141 lb)

Sport
- Country: Great Britain
- Turned pro: 2000
- Coached by: Siri Lindley
Medal record
Representing Great Britain
Women's triathlon
Ironman 70.3
Gold medal – first place	2010	Individual
Silver medal – second place	2014	Individual
ITU Long Distance World Championships
Gold medal – first place	2016	Individual
Gold medal – first place	2009	Individual
Bronze medal – third place	2012	Individual

Jodie Ann Swallow (born 23 June 1981) is a British triathlete and former swimmer from Brentwood, Essex.

== Triathlon career ==
Swallow is the 2010 Ironman 70.3 champion as well as the winner of the 2009 and 2016 ITU Long Distance Triathlon World Championships.

In 2004, Swallow represented Great Britain at the Summer Olympics competing in triathlon, placing 34th. At the 2014 Ironman World Championship she placed 4th, less than 10 minutes behind champion Mirinda Carfrae.

== Swimming career ==
At the ASA National British Championships she won the 400 metres medley title in 1996.
