= Barbara Lindquist =

American triathlete

Medal record

Women's Triathlon

Representing the United States

ITU World Championships
Silver medal – second place	2002 Cancún	Elite

ITU World Cup
Gold medal – first place	2003	Overall

Barbara ("Barb") Metz Lindquist (born July 1, 1969, in Wilmington, Delaware) is a swimmer and triathlete from the United States.

She competed as a swimmer at Stanford University, and was on the swimmers' U.S. National Team, leaving the U.S. team in 1991.

She became a professional triathlete in 1996.

From February 2003 through 2004, she was ranked first in the world as a triathlete.

Lindquist competed at the Olympic triathlon in 2004, placing ninth.

She was on the U.S. world championship triathlon team ten times.

Lindquist retired as a triathlete in 2005. She later served as the coach of the Under-23 National [Triathlon] Team and as the USAT Collegiate Recruitment Program Coordinator.

== Recognition ==
On Feb. 13, 2010, Lindquist was inducted into the USA Triathlon Hall of Fame.

She was number ten on the publication Inside Triathlon's 10 Most Influential People For 2012.

In 2017 she was inducted into the International Triathlon Union Hall of Fame.
