= Olga Generalova =

Russian triathlete

Olga Generalova (born April 4, 1972) is a Russian triathlete. Born in Gorky (now Nizhny Novgorod), Generalova competed at the second Olympic triathlon at the 2004 Summer Olympics. She took thirty-first place with a total time of 2:11:48.06.
