= Nikolay Yaroshenko =

Russian triathlete

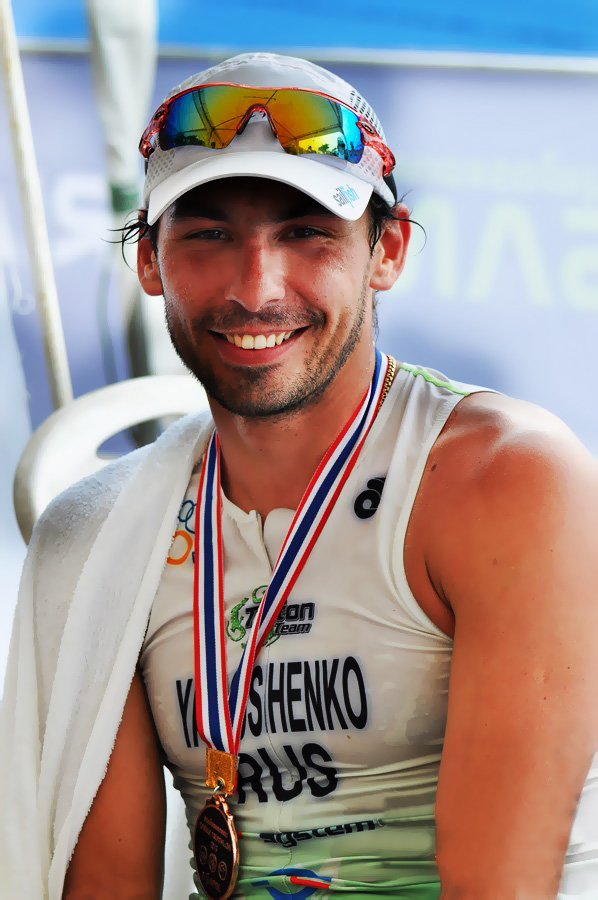
- an international event in Koh Samui 2013.

Personal information
- Nationality: Russian
- Born: 22 April 1986 (age 40) Donetsk Region, Makiivka town, Ukraine
- Height: 1.82 m (6 ft 0 in)
- Weight: 74 kg (163 lb)
- Website: www.instagram.com/yaroshenko_triathlon/

Sport
- Country: Russia
- Sport: Triathlon
- Club: Krasnodar

Nikolay Yaroshenko (Russian: Николай Николаевич Ярошенко; born 22 April 1986) is a Russian triathlete.

== Career ==
Yaroshenko was born and grew up in Ukraine in the Makeyevka town of Donetsk region. He played football In the childhood, but later gave preference to swimming. In 1999 he became the prize-winner of the Junior championship of Ukraine. In 2001 he moved to Donetsk and studied Physical culture and sports High school of S. Bubka. In 2003 Nikolay won the Junior Championship of Ukraine and took part in the European championship team race where they took 7th place. In 2004 Yaroshenko became a member of the Ukraine national triathlon team. That same year his team took the 2nd place at the European championship. In 2006 he was selected to represent Ukraine at the European and World championship where he took the 3rd place in the relay race.

In 2007 he was the overall winner of the Russian Cup. In 2009 Nikolay took the 6th place at the Russian championship and 2nd place in the relay championship. In 2010, racing in France, he had his first experience racing in long distance triathlon. In 2012, he took 7th place at the ITU Long Distance Triathlon World Championships. At next year's following long distance championship he would place 9th.

== Results ==
- Ukraine National Champion (2005-2006)
- Multiple Russian National Championships podiums (2007-2012) team-relay
- Continental Cups podiums (2009-2012)

Results

Date	Competition	Place	Rank
2004	European Championship (U23)	Hungary	2
2006	European Championship (elite)	France	3
2010	Championship Russia (elite)	Russia	3
2012	European Championship 70.3	Germany	7
2012	World Championship long distance	Spain	7
2012-09-22	Asian Championship	China	1
2013-03-02	Rus National Championship Aquathlon	Russia	2
2013-04-13	Chengdu ITU Triathlon Premium Asian Cup	China	14
2013-04-21	Koh Samui International Triathlon Long Distance	Thailand	8
2013-05-19	Barcelona ETU Challenge Middle Distance Triathlon European Championships	Spain	7
2013-06-01	Belfort ITU Long Distance Triathlon World Championships	France	9
2013-06-22	Burabay ITU Sprint Triathlon Premium Asian Cup	Kazakhstan	6
2013-07-20	RUS Long Distance Triathlon National Championships	Russia	2
2013-08-02	Tristar Estonia Long Distance Triathlon	Estonia	4
2013-09-20	RUS Duathlon National Championships	Russia	7
2013-09-02	RUS National Championship among military	Russia	2

== Gallery ==
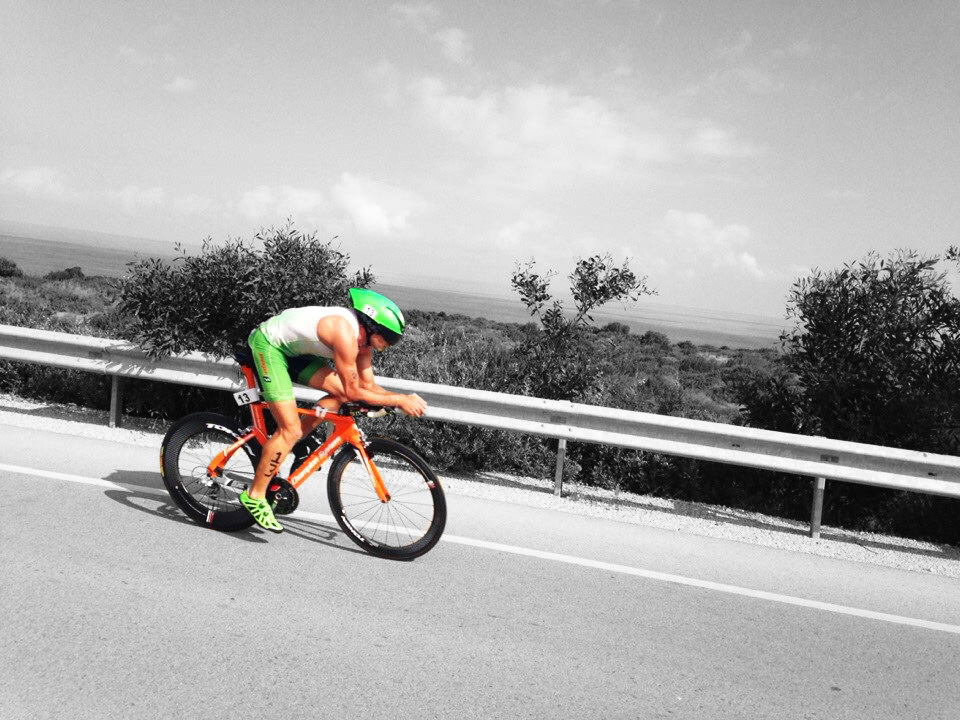

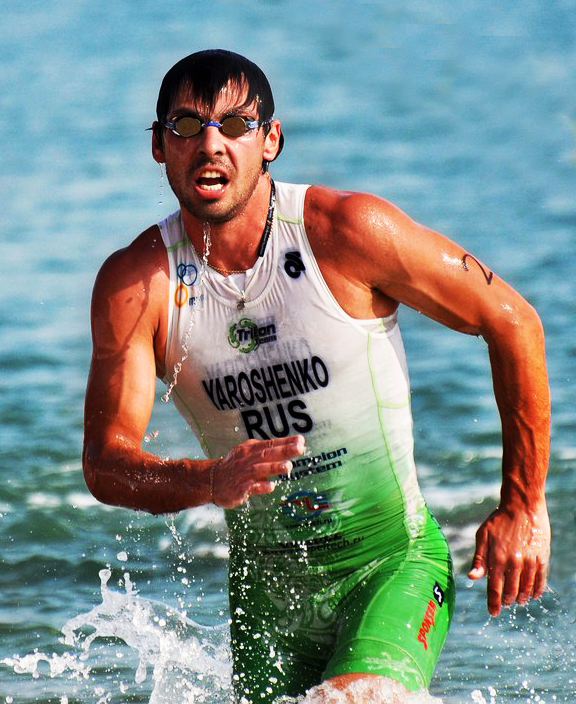

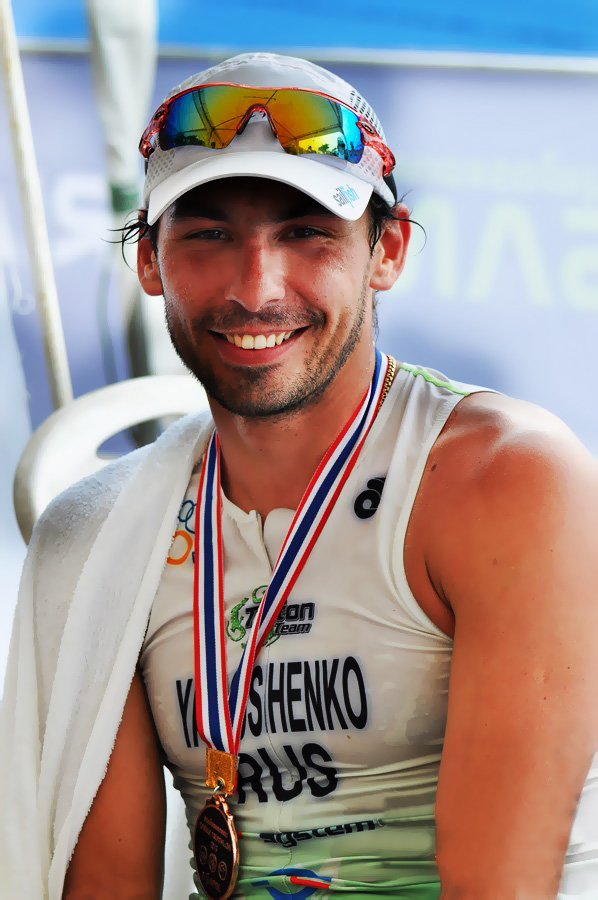

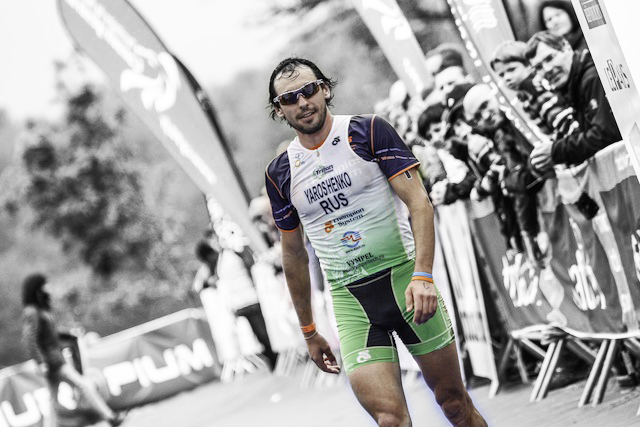

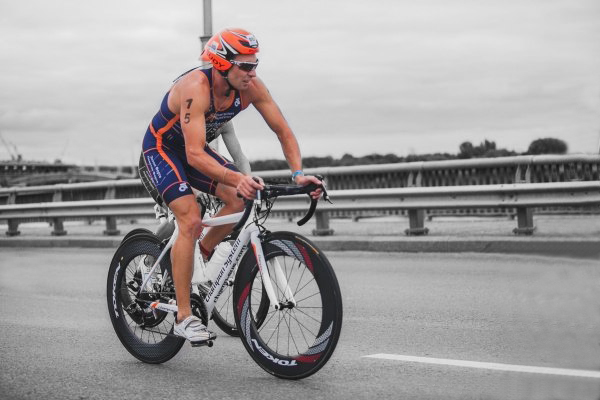

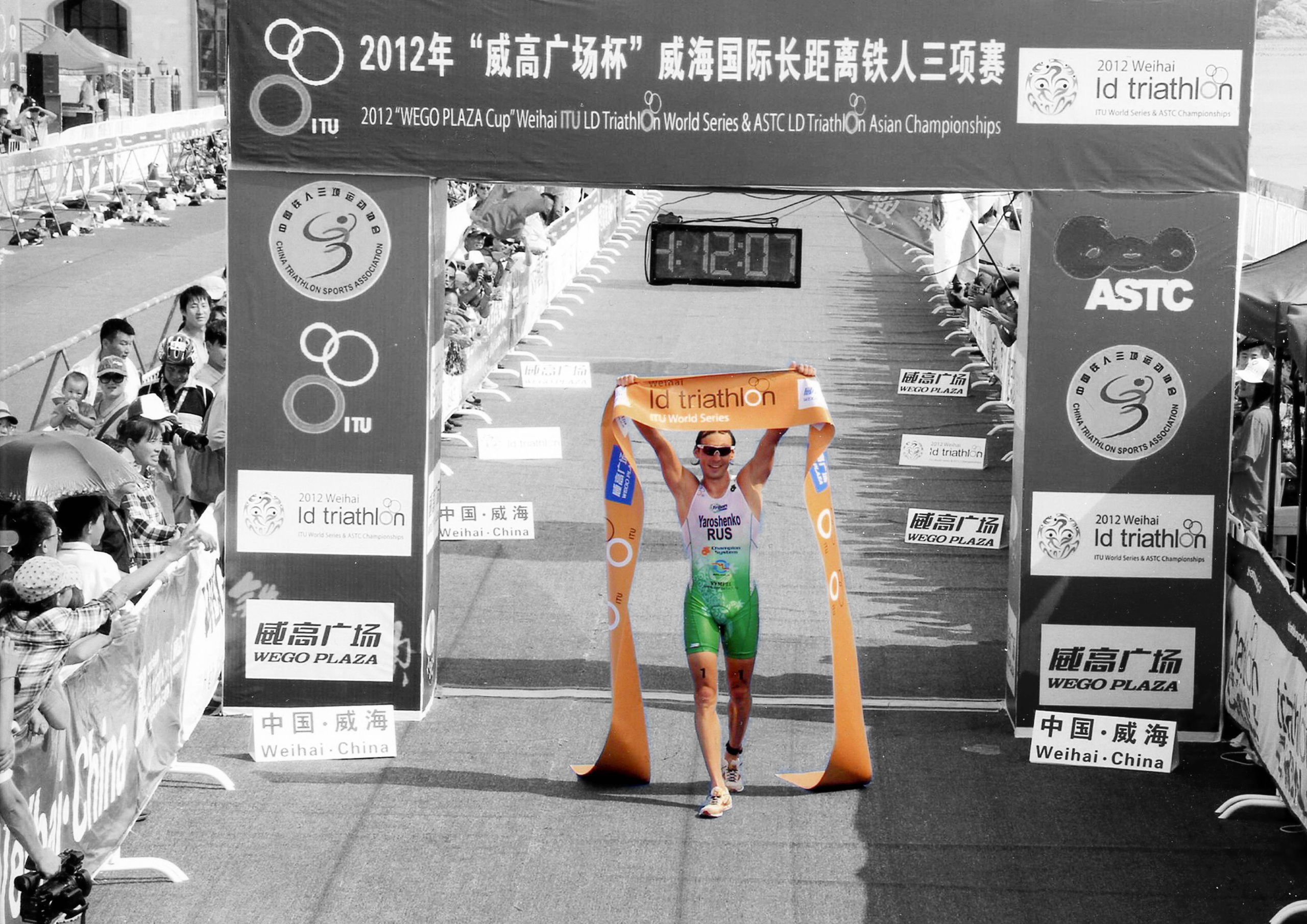

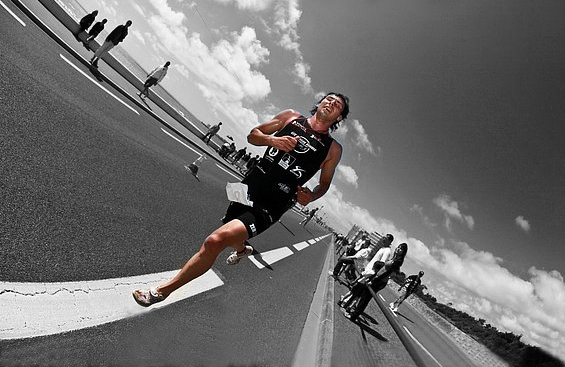

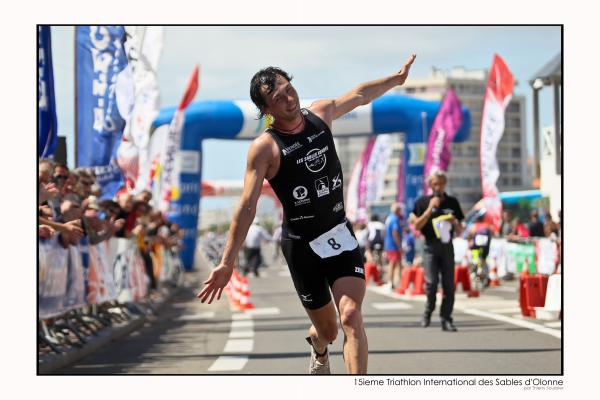

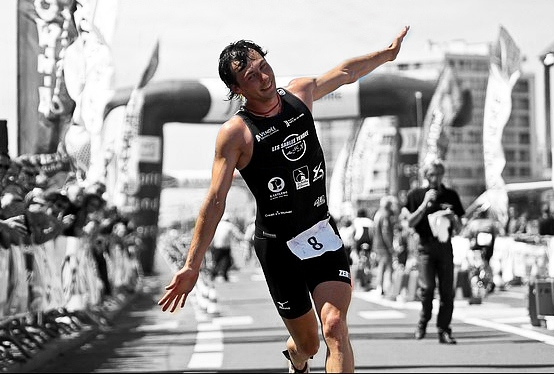
