= Sven Riederer =

Swiss triathlete (born 1981)

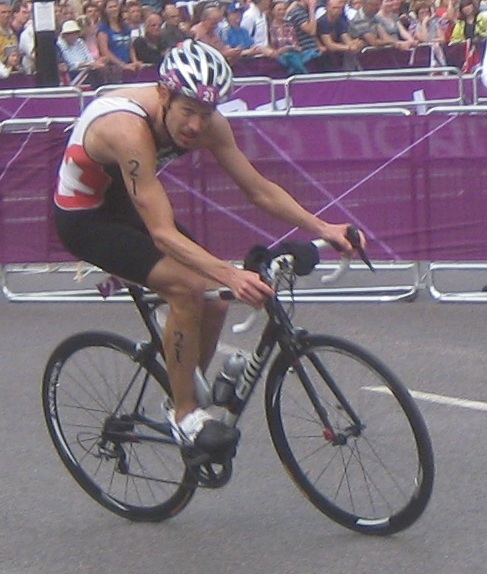
- Riederer at the 2012 Olympics.

Personal information
- Born: 27 March 1981 (age 45) Bad Ragaz, Switzerland
Medal record
Men's triathlon
Representing Switzerland
Olympic Games
| Bronze medal – third place | 2004 Athens | Individual |
Team World Championships
| Silver medal – second place | 2011 Lausanne | Team |

Sven Riederer (born 27 March 1981) is an athlete from Switzerland, who competes in triathlon. Riederer competed in the second Olympic triathlon at the 2004 Summer Olympics. He won the bronze medal with a time of 1:51:33.26, 25.5 seconds behind the leader after the nearly two-hour race.
