= Carl Blasco =

French triathlete (born 1971)

Carl Blasco (born 11 September 1971) is an athlete from France. He is a triathlete.

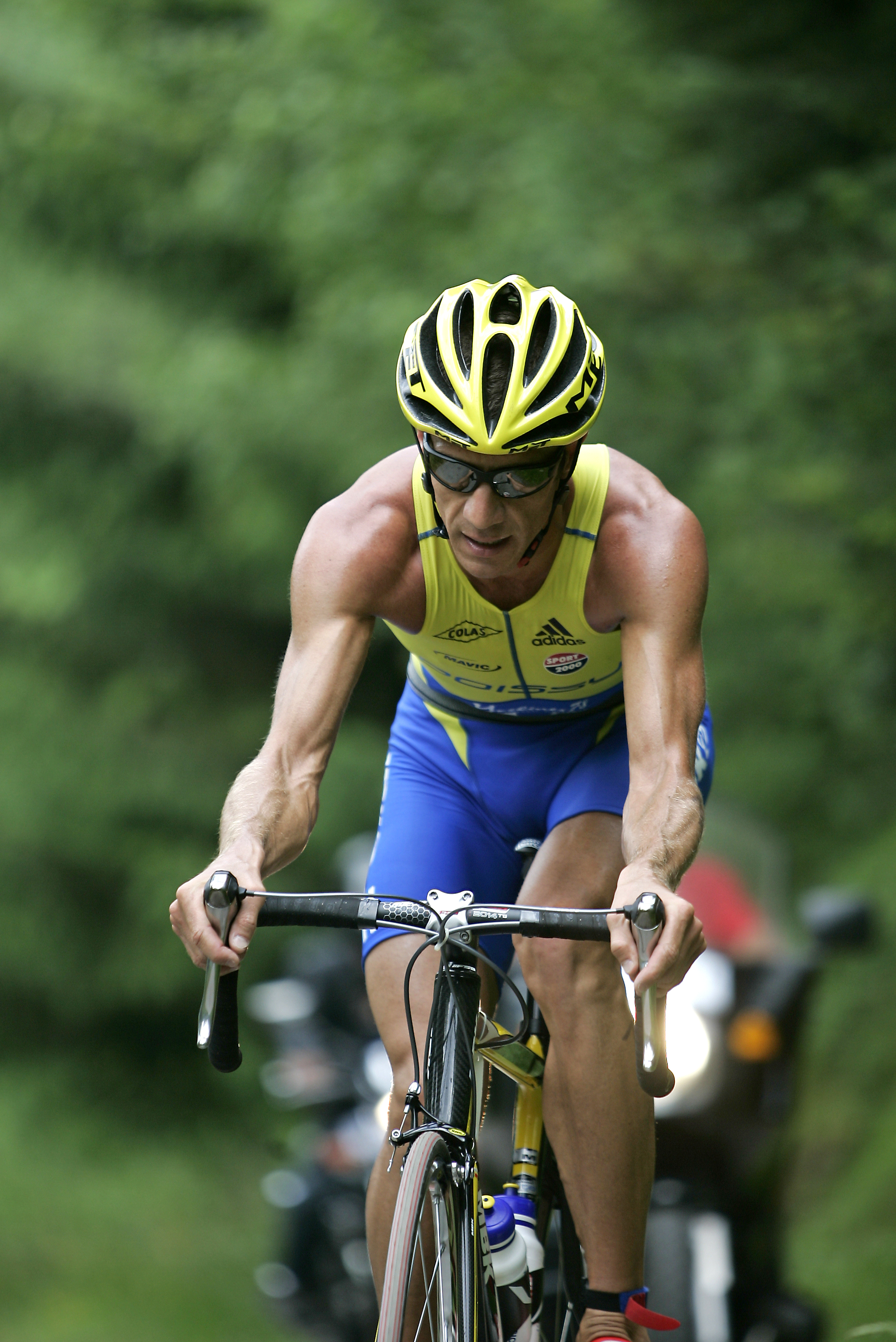
Carl Blasco

Blasco competed at the first Olympic triathlon at the 2000 Summer Olympics. He took nineteenth place with a total time of 1:50:18.02.

Four years later, at the 2004 Summer Olympics, Blasco again competed. This time, he placed twelfth with a time of 1:53:20.16.

== Biography ==
Bronze medalist at the 2002 French Championships and winner of the Gérardmer Triathlon in 2005, Carl Blasco has competed in two Olympic Games (Sydney 2000, 2004 Summer Olympics) and came fourth in the 2000 World Championships.

He is with Jessica Harrison (triathlete) and Carole Péon, who have been a couple for several years, one of three triathletes who agreed to discuss their homosexuality on a documentary program on the Canal+ television channel called Sport et homosexualité (Sport and Homosexuality), broadcast in 2010. On this occasion, he discusses the reasons and choices that led him to come out shortly before the Sydney Olympics, in which he participated.

Having ended his athletic career in 2007, he now runs a psychotherapy practice specializing primarily in sports.

== Bibliography ==
- Evans, Hilary; Gjerde, Arild; Heijmans, Jeroen; Mallon, Bill; et al. "Carl Blasco". Olympics at Sports-Reference.com. Sports Reference LLC. Archived from the original on 17 April 2020.
