= Victor Plata =

American triathlete

Personal information
- Born: April 1, 1973 (age 53) Minneapolis, Minnesota, United States
- Home town: Santa Cruz, California, United States

Sport
- Sport: Triathlon

Victor Andres Plata (born April 1, 1973) is a triathlete from the United States. He is a native of Minneapolis, Minnesota and his hometown is Santa Cruz, California.

Plata competed at the second Olympic triathlon at the 2004 Summer Olympics. He placed 27th with a total time of 1:57:09.09.

Plata was the alternate for the U.S. Olympic Team in 2000. In 2005, Plata was ranked as high as 4th in the International Triathlon Union World Rankings.

In 1997, Plata graduated from California Polytechnic State University in San Luis Obispo with a Bachelor of Science degree in social sciences.
