= Hiroyuki Nishiuchi =

Japanese triathlete

Hiroyuki Nishiuchi (西内 洋行, Nishiuchi Hiroyuki) (born October 13, 1975) is an athlete from Japan. He competes in the triathlon.

Nishiuchi competed at the first Olympic triathlon at the 2000 Summer Olympics. He took forty-sixth place with a total time of 1:56:59.76.

Four years later, at the 2004 Summer Olympics, Nishiuchi competed again. He placed thirty-second with a time of 1:57:43.51.
