= Paulo Miyashiro =

Brazilian triathlete

Personal information
- Born: June 7, 1976 (age 49); Santos, São Paulo, Brazil

Sport
- Sport: Triathlon

Paulo Henrique Miyashiro de Abreu (born June 7, 1976) is an athlete from Brazil. He competes in triathlon.

Miyashiro competed at the second Olympic triathlon at the 2004 Summer Olympics. He placed thirty-fourth with a total time of 1:58:16.76.
