= Merja Kiviranta =

Finnish cyclist

Personal information
- Full name: Merja Kiviranta
- Born: 1 October 1977 (age 49)

Cycling career
- Sport: Cycling
- Role: Rider

Merja Kiviranta (born 1 October 1977) is a Finnish former racing cyclist. She finished in second place in the Finnish National Road Race Championships in 2009. She also competed at the 2005 ITU Triathlon World Championships.
