= Andrew Johns (triathlete) =

British triathlete

Medal record

Men's triathlon

Representing Great Britain

ITU World Championships
Bronze medal – third place	2002 Cancún	Elite

ITU World Cup
Gold medal – first place	1998	Overall World Cup
Gold medal – first place	2000	Overall World Cup

ETU European Championships
Gold medal – first place	1998	Elite
Gold medal – first place	2000	Elite
Bronze medal – third place	2006	Elite

Ironman World Championship 70.3
Bronze medal – third place	2007	Elite

Andrew Johns (born 23 September 1973) is a male triathlete from the United Kingdom. Johns is a former European and World Cup Champion, as well as a World Championship bronze medalist.

Born in Peterborough, Johns competed at the first Olympic triathlon at the 2000 Summer Olympics. He was one of the three British triathletes, along with Sian Brice and Michelle Dillon, that did not finish the competition.

Four years later, at the 2004 Summer Olympics, Johns competed again. This time, he did finish. His time was 1:54:15.87 for sixteenth place.
