= Delphine Pelletier =

French triathlete (born 1977)

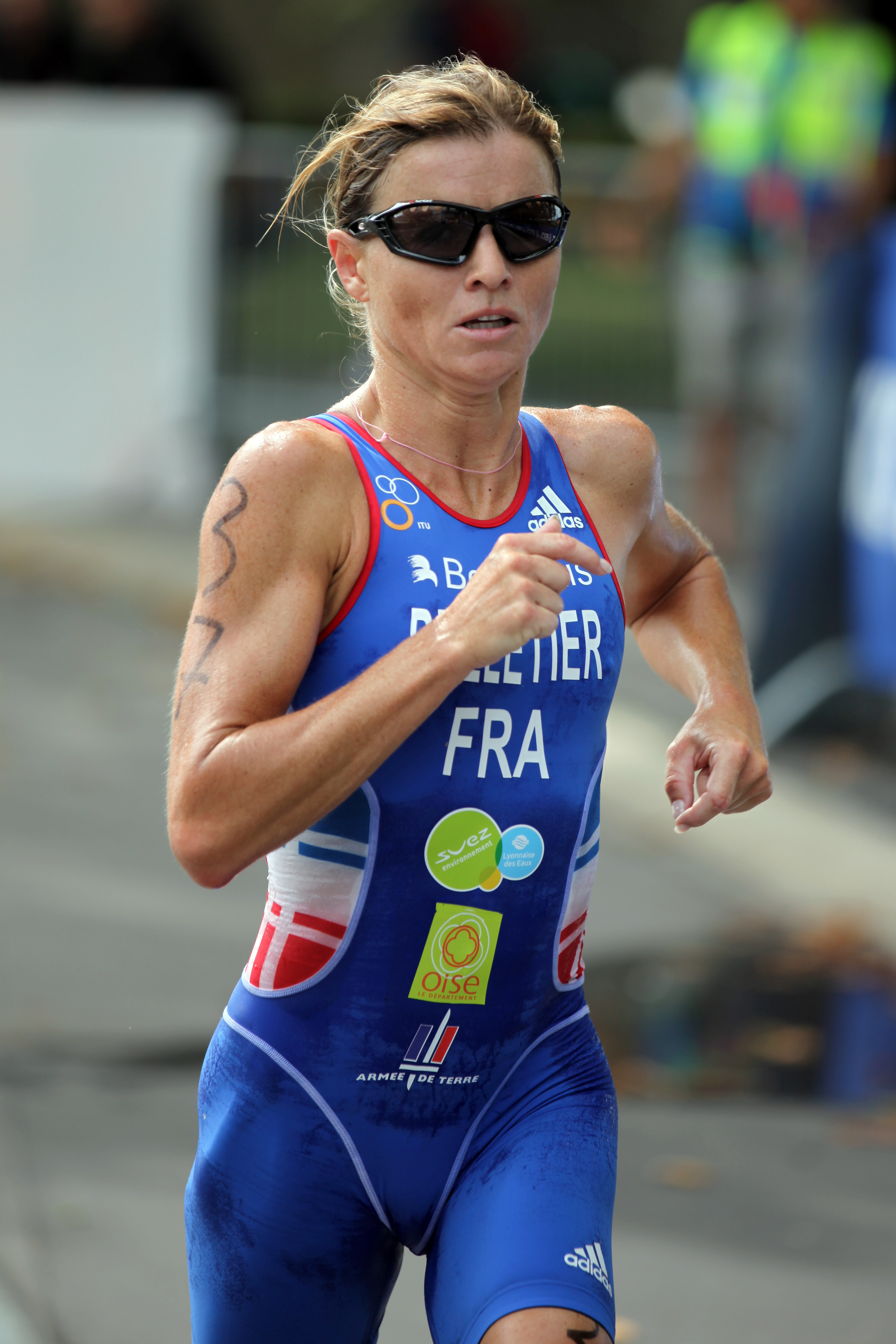
Delphine Pelletier at the Military Triathlon World Championship in Lausanne, 2012.

Delphine Pelletier (born 16 June 1977 in Bourges) is an athlete from France, who competes in triathlon. Pelletier competed at the second Olympic triathlon at the 2004 Summer Olympics. She is a ten-time French champion.
