= Csaba Kuttor =

Hungarian triathlete

Csaba Kuttor (born August 19, 1975 in Miskolc, Borsod-Abaúj-Zemplén) is a Hungarian triathlete. Kuttor competed at the first Olympic triathlon at the 2000 Summer Olympics. He took thirtieth place with a total time of 1:51:05.74.

Four years later, he qualified for the 2004 Summer Olympics. This time he could not compete in the race because of an illness.

At the 2008 Summer Olympics he took 47th place with a total time of 1:55:53.38.
