= Stuart Hayes =

English triathlete

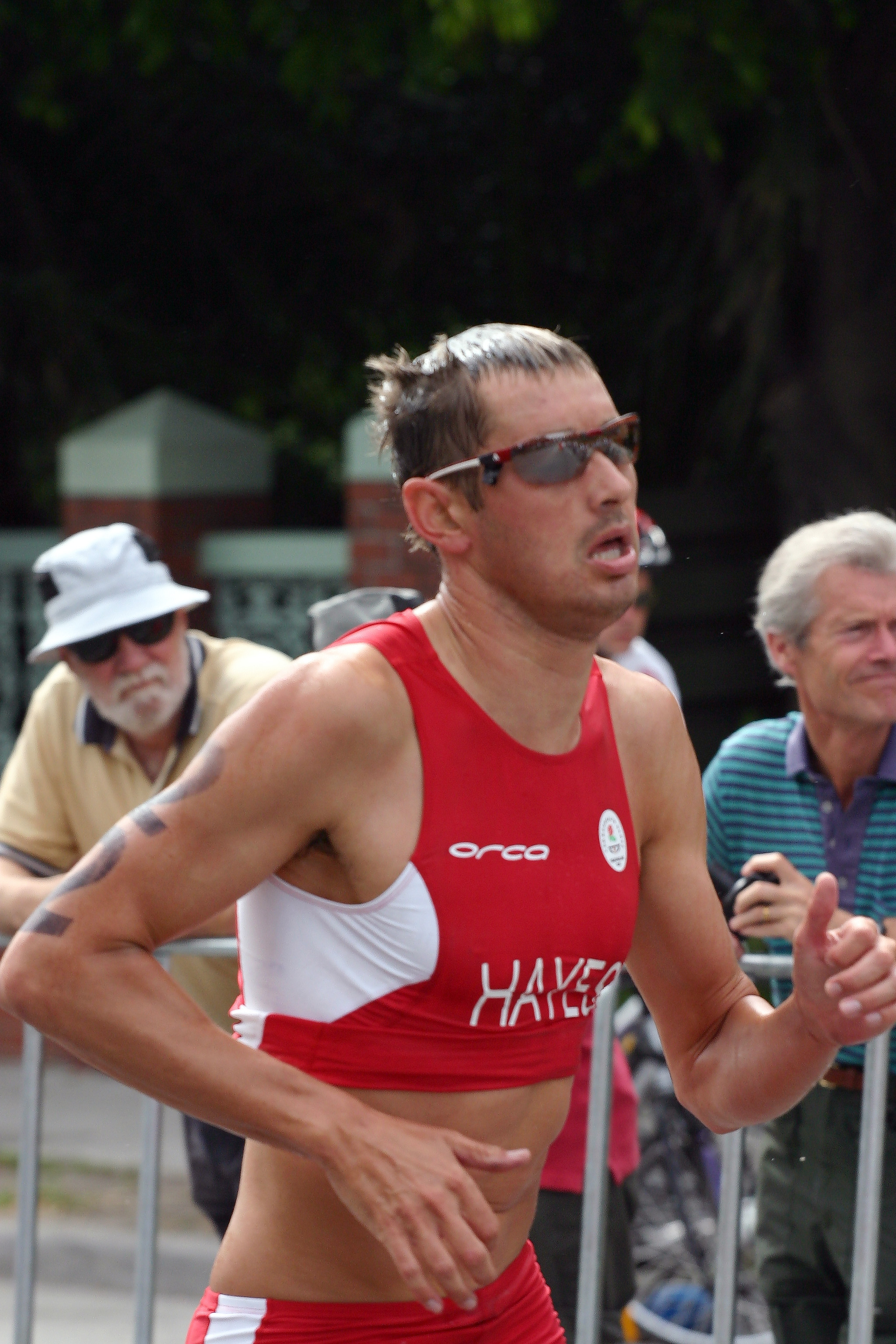
Stuart Hayes

Stuart Philip Alfred Hayes (born 16 April 1979 in Isleworth, London) is an English triathlete.

Hayes began his sports career as a swimmer at Hounslow Swimming Club but converted to triathlon at the age of 15; Hayes said he became "fed up of swimming up and down all day counting tiles". He is coached by his wife, Michelle Dillon.

Hayes missed out on selection for the 2004 Summer Olympics in Athens, Greece, but finished the year ranked 3rd in the world. He failed to qualify for the 2008 Summer Olympics in Beijing, China, after suffering two punctures during the qualification event.

In 2010 he won his first ITU Triathlon World Cup event in Kitzbühel, Austria; Hayes was part of a group of five riders who broke away on the cycling leg of the event and won in a time of one hour 52 minutes 32 seconds.

At the 2011 ITU Triathlon World Cup event in Hyde Park, London, Hayes finished in 46th position in an event won by compatriot Alistair Brownlee over the course that will be used for the 2012 Summer Olympics.

Hayes was selected to represent Great Britain at the 2012 Summer Olympics in the men's triathlon alongside brothers Alistair and Jonathan Brownlee. Hayes, who was ranked 46th in the world at the time of his selection, was chosen ahead of world number 12, Will Clarke, and world number 13, Tim Don, because of his ability to perform a domestique role for the Brownlees. The event took place in Hyde Park with the swim being held in the Serpentine. The cycle involved athletes leaving the park via Queen Mother's Gate, travelling through Wellington Arch, down Constitution Hill and on to Birdcage Walk in front of Buckingham Palace before returning to the park to complete the event with a four lap run around the Serpentine. Hayes finished in 37th place, however his job in this race was to help the two Brownlee brothers, a job he succeeded in as Alistair finished in gold medal position and Jonny in bronze.

After retiring in 2015, Hayes made a comeback to international triathlon competition in 2023, placing 4th at the 40-44AG World Sprint Triathlon Championships in Hamburg.
