= Norbert Domnik =

Austrian triathlete

Norbert Domnik (born 30 July 1964) is an athlete from Austria, who competes in triathlon.

Domnik competed at the second Olympic triathlon at the 2004 Summer Olympics. He placed thirty-seventh with a total time of 1:59:13.25.
