= 2004 ITU Long Distance Triathlon World Championships =

International sports competition

World Long Distance Triathlon Championships
- Location: Säter, Sweden
- Date: July 4, 2004

The 2004 ITU Long Distance Triathlon World Championships was a triathlon competition held in Säter in Sweden on July 4, 2004, and organized by the International Triathlon Union, now World Triathlon. This was the 11th edition of the competition inaugurated in 1994.

The Elite races for men and women consisted of a 4 km (2.5 mi) swim, 120 km (75 mi) bike and 30 km (19 mi) run, longer than the standard 1.5 km swim, 40 km bike and 10 km run associated with the World Triathlon Championship Series and the Olympic Games, but shorter than the classic Ironman Triathlon event.

A series of age-group amateur championship races were held alongside the Elite races.

== Medal Summary ==
Event	Gold		Silver		Bronze	
Men	Torbjørn Sindballe; Denmark	5:46:14	Jonas Colting; Sweden	5:46:57	Marino Vanhoenacker; Belgium	5:51:10
Women	Tamara Kozulina; Ukraine	6:41:29	Lisbeth Kristensen; Denmark	6:42:11	Sione Jongstra; Netherlands	6:43:30

== Results ==
The following are the results of the elite races:

=== Men ===
Rank	Athlete	Nation	Swim	T1	Bike	T2	Run	Overall time
1st place, gold medalist(s)	Torbjorn Sindballe	Denmark	54:37	0:46	2:56:48	0:54	1:53:07	5:46:14
2nd place, silver medalist(s)	Jonas Colting	Sweden	53:59	0:54	3:01:37	0:48	1:49:37	5:46:57
3rd place, bronze medalist(s)	Marino Vanhoenacker	Belgium	54:52	0:47	3:03:48	0:52	1:50:48	5:51:10
4	Xavier Le Floch	France	54:39	0:46	3:03:48	0:57	1:51:24	5:51:35
5	Gilles Reboul	France	54:35	0:43	3:03:51	0:53	1:53:49	5:53:54
6	Julien Loy	France	53:57	0:54	3:05:35	1:13	1:53:41	5:55:23
7	Paul Fritzsche	United States	54:54	0:51	3:06:11	1:02	1:53:42	5:56:43
8	Patrick Vernay	France	54:38	0:46	3:03:54	0:48	1:56:55	5:57:03
9	Bjorn Andersson	Sweden	52:39	0:51	2:56:11	0:46	2:06:49	5:57:19
10	Mika Luoto	Finland	58:58	0:54	3:09:14	0:38	1:49:35	5:59:21
11	Gerrit Schellens	Belgium	59:56	0:54	3:13:56	0:57	1:45:10	6:00:55
12	Guido Gosselink	Netherlands	58:57	1:11	3:00:45	1:13	1:59:54	6:02:01
13	Marcel Zamora Pérez	Spain	54:22	0:45	3:07:55	1:02	1:59:34	6:03:42
14	David Castro Iglesias	Spain	54:49	0:54	3:17:44	0:53	1:50:16	6:04:36
15	Teemu Toivanen	Finland	54:55	0:53	3:13:30	0:53	1:55:09	6:05:23
16	Gael Mainard	France	52:56	0:48	3:07:34	0:56	2:04:02	6:06:20
17	Sergio Marques	Portugal	1:00:07	0:54	3:15:06	0:53	1:50:14	6:07:18
18	Alejandro Santamaria Perez	Spain	1:03:41	0:58	3:13:03	1:04	1:48:52	6:07:40
19	Federico Girasole	Italy	59:46	1:08	3:08:13	1:09	1:58:02	6:08:20
20	Joachim Willen	Sweden	52:38	0:41	3:14:09	0:43	2:00:54	6:09:09
21	Erih Pecnik	Slovenia	55:44	1:12	3:06:28	1:31	2:04:34	6:09:33
22	Petr Vabrousek	Czech Republic	59:45	0:54	3:16:45	1:17	1:53:03	6:11:47
23	Ben Harley	Australia	54:50	0:59	3:09:35	0:58	2:06:37	6:13:02
24	Jens Koefoed	Denmark	57:36	1:07	3:10:28	1:04	2:03:37	6:13:54
25	Martin Matula	Czech Republic	59:46	1:02	3:11:12	1:12	2:01:32	6:14:47
26	Russel Kober	Great Britain	59:42	0:54	3:11:20	0:52	2:02:45	6:15:34
27	Stefano Paoli	Italy	54:54	0:53	3:13:31	1:06	2:05:52	6:16:18
28	Kim Visby Jensen	Denmark	59:48	0:58	3:08:33	0:59	2:06:05	6:16:24
29	Marco Salamon	Italy	59:49	0:51	3:18:10	0:56	1:57:59	6:17:46
30	Jarmo Hast	Finland	54:00	0:50	3:23:19	0:50	1:59:48	6:18:50
31	Jan Vodehnal	Czech Republic	59:05	0:54	3:12:20	0:47	2:06:12	6:19:19
32	Niklas Nilsson	Sweden	1:03:45	0:57	3:12:04	0:54	2:03:29	6:21:12
33	Bevan Leach	Australia	54:46	0:48	3:07:52	0:54	2:17:33	6:21:57
34	Jari Vuorinen	Finland	1:07:23	1:22	3:14:59	0:52	1:58:11	6:22:49
35	Jordi Alsina	Spain	1:07:27	1:21	3:15:52	0:50	1:57:32	6:23:03
36	Jan Wainer	Czech Republic	54:55	1:00	3:20:33	0:56	2:10:59	6:28:26
37	Stephen Bayliss	Great Britain	57:23	0:50	3:16:54	0:43	2:13:44	6:29:36
38	Dave Julian	United States	55:50	1:17	3:12:28	1:11	2:22:13	6:32:59
39	Masayuki Matsumaru	Japan	1:03:45	0:59	3:18:34	1:21	2:10:41	6:35:23
40	David Vydra	Czech Republic	1:13:02	1:07	3:18:27	0:53	2:02:29	6:35:59
41	Kai Soderdahl	Finland	1:07:27	1:02	3:26:22	1:27	2:03:30	6:39:51
42	Fernando Cabellos Saiz	Spain	55:09	0:57	3:29:47	1:18	2:14:47	6:42:02
43	Ole Stougaard	Denmark	1:07:37	1:26	3:25:40	1:14	2:09:04	6:45:03
44	Richard Brady	Ireland	1:04:01	0:50	3:34:00	1:11	2:31:00	7:11:03
-	Alessandro Alessandri	Italy	1:08:17	0:59	3:15:26	0:56	-	DNF
-	Ted As	Sweden	1:03:40	0:59	3:24:12	1:23	-	DNF
-	James Bonney	United States	52:53	1:04	-	-	-	DNF
-	Gianpietro De Faveri	Italy	52:44	1:05	3:12:45	1:10	-	DNF
-	Frederic Kohl	Austria	53:59	0:59	3:06:24	0:58	-	DNF
-	Ioannis Panayiotis	Greece	1:09:22	1:48	-	-	-	DNF
-	Rene Rovera	France	59:00	1:02	3:15:26	-	-	DNF
Key : DNF - did not finish ; DNS - did not start

=== Women ===
Rank	Athlete	Nation	Swim	T1	Bike	T2	Run	Overall time
1st place, gold medalist(s)	Tamara Kozulina	Ukraine	1:10:00	1:42	3:23:57	1:06	2:04:41	6:41:29
2nd place, silver medalist(s)	Lisbeth Kristensen	Denmark	59:30	0:59	3:27:55	1:09	2:12:37	6:42:11
3rd place, bronze medalist(s)	Sione Jongstra	Netherlands	1:03:42	1:08	3:27:35	1:00	2:10:03	6:43:30
4	Bella Bayliss	Great Britain	1:08:40	1:02	3:27:40	0:47	2:06:03	6:44:16
5	Tiina Boman	Finland	1:05:12	1:02	3:30:51	1:09	2:08:27	6:46:44
6	Sara Gross	Great Britain	1:05:16	1:08	3:37:45	0:48	2:05:27	6:50:27
7	Cristina Azanza Moreno	Spain	1:03:25	0:54	3:34:53	0:57	2:13:18	6:53:31
8	Edith Niederfriniger	Italy	1:00:01	1:06	3:44:06	1:06	2:09:41	6:56:02
9	Estelle Patou	France	1:03:21	1:07	3:31:33	1:04	2:22:47	6:59:53
10	Eva Novakova	Czech Republic	59:27	1:20	3:38:44	0:48	2:19:58	7:00:19
11	Julie Curwin	Canada	1:05:55	1:28	3:32:16	1:11	2:20:06	7:01:00
12	Audrey Cleau	France	1:12:39	0:59	3:31:25	0:57	2:15:39	7:01:41
13	Isabelle Ferrer	France	1:08:41	0:57	3:36:45	0:56	2:14:50	7:02:10
14	Rebekah Keat	Australia	1:03:23	1:09	3:32:55	1:09	2:23:37	7:02:13
15	Bianca Van Dijk	Netherlands	1:05:13	1:47	3:35:08	1:23	2:19:12	7:02:44
16	Sofie Dovren	Sweden	1:03:32	1:19	3:32:01	1:18	2:25:11	7:03:22
17	Manuela Ianesi	Italy	59:29	1:02	3:41:40	1:10	2:20:25	7:03:48
18	Melissa Vandewater	Australia	1:05:17	1:27	3:37:17	1:10	2:19:16	7:04:28
19	Gabriela Loskotova	Czech Republic	1:03:43	1:34	3:45:35	2:32	2:15:19	7:08:46
20	Viktoria Persson	Sweden	1:08:37	1:04	3:32:15	1:10	2:29:15	7:12:23
21	Martina Dogana	Italy	1:05:17	1:02	3:41:56	1:00	2:24:55	7:14:14
22	Alison Hayden	United States	59:49	1:08	3:48:43	0:58	2:25:57	7:16:37
23	Inmaculada Pereiro Gonzalez	Spain	1:24:33	1:20	3:41:56	0:59	2:08:14	7:17:05
24	Nerea Martinez Urruzola	Spain	1:05:19	1:06	3:49:11	1:28	2:20:32	7:17:37
25	Ana Casares Polo	Spain	1:12:46	1:07	3:44:44	1:06	2:19:30	7:19:14
26	Liz Vitai	United States	1:08:38	1:30	3:41:53	1:19	2:29:48	7:23:12
27	Jenny Kroon	Sweden	1:12:24	1:15	3:38:41	1:12	2:30:44	7:24:19
28	Chiharu Chiba	Japan	1:03:49	1:18	4:01:06	1:06	2:25:40	7:33:00
29	Dina Braguti	Italy	1:05:20	1:27	3:36:49	1:06	2:49:24	7:34:09
30	Trudy Brown	Ireland	1:12:40	1:15	3:37:23	1:06	2:55:27	7:47:52
31	Akiko Watanabe	Japan	1:13:18	1:45	4:08:27	1:02	2:25:52	7:50:27
-	Karin Forsberg	Sweden	1:06:42	-	-	-	-	DNF
-	Kina Gustavsson	Sweden	1:01:43	1:18	-	-	-	DNF
-	Rachel Horn	Great Britain	1:03:28	1:22	3:29:17	0:48	-	DNF
-	Lena Wahlqvist	Sweden	1:02:05	1:10	-	-	-	DNF
Key : DNF - did not finish ; DNS - did not start
