= 2006 ITU Long Distance Triathlon World Championships =

International sports competition

World Long Distance Triathlon Championships
- Location: Canberra, Australia
- Date: November 19, 2006
- Competitors: 63 (41 men, 22 women)

Champions
- Men: Torbjørn Sindballe (Denmark)
- Women: Bella Bayliss (United Kingdom)

The 2006 ITU Long Distance Triathlon World Championships was a triathlon competition held in Canberra in Australia on November 19, 2006 and organized by the International Triathlon Union, now World Triathlon. This was the 13th edition of the competition inaugurated in 1994.

The Elite races for men and women consisted of a 4 km (2.5 mi) swim, 120 km (75 mi) bike and 30 km (19 mi) run, longer than the standard 1.5 km swim, 40 km bike and 10 km run associated with the World Triathlon Championship Series and the Olympic Games, but shorter than the classic Ironman Triathlon event.

In addition to the two professional elite races, a series of age-group amateur championship races were also held.

Transition timings were not recorded separately in this edition of the championships.

== Medal Summary ==
Event	Gold		Silver		Bronze	
Men	Torbjorn Sindballe; Denmark	5:59:13	Craig Alexander; Australia	6:00:35	Marino Vanhoenacker; Belgium	6:02:22
Women	Bella Bayliss; Great Britain	6:55:32	Edith Niederfriniger; Italy	6:57:17	Johanna Daumas; France	7:00:50

== Elite results ==
The following are the results of the elite races:

=== Men ===
41 athletes began the race, with 37 competitors completing the course. 2004 champion, Dane Torbjørn Sindballe won the title again in 5 hours 59 minutes and 13 seconds, a winning margin of 82 seconds despite losing between eleven and thirteen minutes on the run leg to the next three finishers, by virtue of a monstrous bike leg, taking twelve minutes out of the rest of the field.

Rank	Athlete	Nation	Swim	Bike	Run	Overall time
1st place, gold medalist(s)	Torbjørn Sindballe	Denmark (DEN)	51:23	3:02:26	2:05:22	5:59:13
2nd place, silver medalist(s)	Craig Alexander	Australia (AUS)	51:16	3:14:52	1:54:26	6:00:35
3rd place, bronze medalist(s)	Marino Vanhoenacker	Belgium (BEL)	54:13	3:16:01	1:52:07	6:02:22
4	Julien Loy	France (FRA)	51:30	3:19:12	1:52:02	6:02:46
5	Nathan Richmond	New Zealand (NZL)	50:41	3:14:37	1:59:35	6:04:53
6	Patrick Vernay	France (FRA)	54:08	3:16:13	1:56:23	6:06:45
7	Hervé Faure	France (FRA)	53:54	3:16:32	1:57:00	6:07:26
8	Jonas Colting	Sweden (SWE)	51:15	3:18:39	1:58:01	6:07:56
9	Reinaldo Colucci	Brazil (BRA)	51:21	3:14:10	2:05:17	6:10:49
10	Jens Koefoed	Denmark (DEN)	54:33	3:15:52	2:00:49	6:11:15
11	Alejandro Santamaria Perez	Spain (ESP)	57:38	3:19:30	1:55:22	6:12:31
12	Gilles Reboul	France (FRA)	54:20	3:20:52	1:58:42	6:13:56
13	Rene Goehler	Germany (GER)	50:49	3:16:50	2:06:23	6:14:03
14	Cyrille Neveu	France (FRA)	53:46	3:16:49	2:04:03	6:14:40
15	Jimmy Johnsen	Denmark (DEN)	55:06	3:15:20	2:04:19	6:14:45
16	Stephen Sheldrake	New Zealand (NZL)	50:13	3:15:27	2:09:37	6:15:18
17	Boyd Conrick	Australia (AUS)	51:24	3:19:05	2:05:13	6:15:43
18	Marcel Zamora Pérez	Spain (ESP)	54:37	3:22:23	2:00:07	6:17:08
19	Tim Marr	United States (USA)	51:22	3:18:21	2:09:08	6:18:52
20	Stephen Bayliss	Great Britain (GBR)	51:14	3:19:06	2:09:13	6:19:33
21	Ole Stougaard	Denmark (DEN)	56:42	3:20:46	2:02:53	6:20:22
22	Chris Brands	Netherlands (NED)	59:05	3:18:09	2:09:56	6:27:12
23	Gerrit Schellens	Belgium (BEL)	1:01:06	3:28:57	1:58:36	6:28:40
24	Jan Wainer	Czech Republic (CZE)	54:40	3:26:43	2:10:35	6:31:59
25	Stuart Bardsley	Australia (AUS)	58:09	3:21:05	2:13:24	6:32:39
26	Petr Vabrousek	Czech Republic (CZE)	1:00:53	3:26:24	2:11:29	6:38:46
27	Clemente Alonso McKernan	Spain (ESP)	51:42	3:28:03	2:19:56	6:39:42
28	Russel Kober	Great Britain (GBR)	55:10	3:28:29	2:19:37	6:43:17
29	Walter Thorburn	New Zealand (NZL)	59:10	3:24:09	2:21:36	6:44:55
30	Aaron Farlow	Australia (AUS)	53:44	3:33:19	2:21:41	6:48:45
31	Blair Jordan	New Zealand (NZL)	54:02	3:31:27	2:26:11	6:51:41
32	Nick Hornman	Australia (AUS)	51:06	3:29:46	2:32:41	6:53:34
33	Shanon Barnett	New Zealand (NZL)	57:31	3:36:43	2:24:07	6:58:21
34	Teppei Takeuchi	Japan (JPN)	54:34	3:38:57	2:29:55	7:03:28
35	Pawel Wisniewski	Poland (POL)	55:06	3:36:08	2:41:56	7:13:11
36	Elliot Gotovac	Croatia (CRO)	54:09	3:44:42	2:44:43	7:23:36
37	Joseph Zemaitis	United States (USA)	56:53	4:03:23	3:20:28	8:20:44
-	Kieran Doe	New Zealand (NZL)	50:12	3:09:28	-	DNF
-	Sebastien Berlier	France (FRA)	51:10	3:15:14	-	DNF
-	Jasper Blake	Canada (CAN)	55:04	3:25:47	-	DNF
-	Rutger Beke	Belgium (BEL)	1:01:12	-	-	DNF
Key : DNF - did not finish ; DNS - did not start

=== Women ===
Great Britain's Bella Bayliss led home 20 finishers from an original field of 22, overtaking the leader at T2, Johanna Daumas on the final run leg, while holding off a charge from eventual silver medalist Edith Niederfriniger. Bayliss, who also ran under her maidan name Bella Comerford (her husband competing in the male event), was the first Briton to win the title; four further British winners would emerge from the next five editions.

Rank	Athlete	Nation	Swim	Bike	Run	Overall time
1st place, gold medalist(s)	Bella Bayliss	Great Britain (GBR)	59:13	3:45:57	2:10:21	6:55:32
2nd place, silver medalist(s)	Edith Niederfriniger	Italy (ITA)	58:47	3:49:50	2:08:38	6:57:17
3rd place, bronze medalist(s)	Johanna Daumas	France (FRA)	55:10	3:45:45	2:19:54	7:00:50
4	Erika Csomor	Hungary (HUN)	1:11:19	3:41:45	2:12:09	7:05:13
5	Martina Dogana	Italy (ITA)	59:14	3:49:21	2:17:01	7:05:37
6	Sara Gross	Great Britain (GBR)	59:28	3:51:51	2:15:26	7:06:47
7	Heidi Sessner	Germany (GER)	59:14	3:49:29	2:19:48	7:08:33
8	Cristina Azanza Moreno	Spain (ESP)	59:15	3:49:51	2:25:49	7:14:56
9	Abigail Bayley	Great Britain (GBR)	1:03:39	3:50:57	2:26:22	7:21:00
10	Amelia Cox	Australia (AUS)	58:59	3:50:02	2:33:53	7:22:56
11	Linda Gallo	United States (USA)	52:40	3:56:46	2:36:15	7:25:43
12	Kirra Rankin	Australia (AUS)	1:07:40	3:50:59	2:28:55	7:27:35
13	Belinda Halloran	Australia (AUS)	59:03	3:52:15	2:44:24	7:35:42
14	Manuela Ianesi	Italy (ITA)	55:50	3:53:28	2:48:11	7:37:31
15	Rachel Horn	Great Britain (GBR)	1:06:03	4:03:19	2:30:08	7:39:31
16	Fleur Bromley	New Zealand (NZL)	1:07:48	4:10:18	2:41:35	7:59:42
17	Jacinda Papps	New Zealand (NZL)	1:08:36	3:59:07	3:03:51	8:11:33
18	Junko Yashiro	Japan (JPN)	59:35	4:19:16	2:53:12	8:12:03
19	Rachel Sears Casanta	United States (USA)	1:18:59	4:04:17	3:03:43	8:27:00
20	Ruthy Vesler	United States (USA)	1:07:32	4:15:28	3:11:48	8:34:48
-	Lisbeth Kristensen	Denmark (DEN)	59:19	-	-	DNF
-	Eva Novakova	Czech Republic (CZE)	55:51	-	-	DNF
Key : DNF - did not finish ; DNS - did not start

== Age-group championships ==
The following are the medalists from the various amateur age-group championship races.

Event	Gold		Silver		Bronze	
Men 20-24	Chris Stanton; Australia	6:46:32	Richard Thompson; Australia	6:53:37	Renaud Herington; Australia	7:01:25
Men 25-29	Jason Crowther; Australia	6:40:17	Cameron Munro; Australia	6:48:38	Ben Harley; Australia	6:49:11
Men 30-34	Sam Hume; Australia	6:31:42	Nick Burt; Australia	6:41:46	David Bertovic; Australia	6:47:43
Men 35-39	Matthew Wolstencroft; Australia	6:43:53	Stephane Lacroix; France	6:53:07	Trevor Fairhurst; Australia	6:58:28
Men 40-44	Chris Southwell; Australia	6:40:46	Farshad Charmforoosh; United States	6:56:20	Shayne Nairn; New Zealand	7:06:14
Men 45-49	Kevin Fergusson; Australia	6:50:42	Tony Southwell; Australia	6:57:15	Gregory Ball; New Zealand	6:59:54
Men 50-54	Brett Stewart; Australia	7:16:33	Klaus Runer; Italy	7:17:51	Alan Lennon; New Zealand	7:39:39
Men 55-59	Brian Barr; Australia	7:37:55	Bob Harlow; Australia	8:03:47	Miroslav Vrastil; Czech Republic	8:18:24
Men 60-64	Griff Weste; Australia	8:07:56	Denis Honeychurch; United States	8:59:52	Guy Vernay; France	9:03:13
Men 65-69	Ken Murtagh; Australia	13:03:05				
Men 70-74	no finishers from three entrants					
Men 75-79	Bob Scott; United States	10:41:53				
Women
Women 20-24	Maree Hryniuk; Australia	8:04:01	Natsha Lydiard; New Zealand	8:32:02	Sarah Beable; New Zealand	8:37:54
Women 25-29	Kirsten Molloy; Australia	7:14:10	Jennifer Dixon; Australia	7:31:09	Anel Radford; South Africa	7:32:20
Women 30-34	Victoria Wilkinson; Great Britain	7:27:27	Suzanne Always; Australia	7:29:40	Natalie Smith; Australia	7:51:01
Women 35-39	Leanne Southwell; Australia	7:36:32	Belinda Ward; Australia	7:44:28	Julie Gollan-Foard; Australia	7:52:10
Women 40-44	Angela Clarke; Australia	7:45:33	Julie Foster; Australia	7:46:35	Jill Pattison; Australia	8:02:54
Women 45-49	Robyn Mcgreary; Australia	7:50:44	Kate Samuelson; United States	8:33:06	Hedla Lopes; Brazil	8:34:51
Women 50-54	Belinda Soszyn; Australia	8:18:46	Jenny Kelly; Australia	9:04:14	Wendy Heldt; United States	9:04:38
Women 55-59	Lyn Fulton; Australia	9:01:13	Shirley Jean Rolston; New Zealand	10:19:44	Barbara Kostner; United States	11:08:56
Women 60-64	Janet Thompson; United States	11:40:01				
