= 2008 ITU Long Distance Triathlon World Championships =

International sports competition

World Long Distance Triathlon Championships
- Location: Almere, the Netherlands
- Date: August 31, 2008

Champions
- Men: Julien Loy (France)
- Women: Chrissie Wellington (United Kingdom)

The 2008 ITU Long Distance Triathlon World Championships was a triathlon competition held in Almere in the Netherlands on August 31, 2008 and organized by the International Triathlon Union, now World Triathlon. This was the 15th edition of the competition inaugurated in 1994.

The Elite races for men and women consisted of a 4 km (2.5 mi) swim, 120 km (75 mi) bike and 30 km (19 mi) run, longer than the standard 1.5 km swim, 40 km bike and 10 km run associated with the World Triathlon Championship Series and the Olympic Games, but shorter than the classic Ironman Triathlon event.

In addition to the elite professional races, a series of age-group amateur championship races was also held.

== Medal Summary ==
Event	Gold		Silver		Bronze	
Men	Julien Loy; France	5:43:22	François Chabaud; France	5:45:36	Martin Jensen; Denmark	5:46:59
Women	Chrissie Wellington; Great Britain	6:12:44	Charlotte Kolters; Denmark	6:30:15	Yvonne Van Vlerken; Netherlands	6:31:56

== Results ==
The following are the results of the elite races:

=== Men ===
In a highly attritional race, 49 athletes started the event, while only 33 completed the course. Defending champion Julien Loy retained his title

Rank	Athlete	Nation	Swim	T1	Bike	T2	Run	Overall time
1st place, gold medalist(s)	Julien Loy	France (FRA)	1:00:48	2:14	2:53:02	2:11	1:45:08	5:43:22
2nd place, silver medalist(s)	François Chabaud	France (FRA)	1:05:17	2:09	2:48:38	2:16	1:47:14	5:45:36
3rd place, bronze medalist(s)	Martin Jensen	Denmark (DEN)	1:00:31	2:30	2:47:08	2:09	1:54:42	5:46:59
4	Sebastien Berlier	France (FRA)	1:00:45	2:00	2:54:08	2:21	1:49:11	5:48:24
5	Jonas Colting	Sweden (SWE)	1:05:16	2:19	2:51:11	2:41	1:48:11	5:49:36
6	Stephan Bignet	France (FRA)	1:00:33	2:28	2:53:04	2:20	1:52:11	5:50:34
7		Denmark (DEN)	1:05:19	2:09	2:48:32	2:19	1:53:39	5:51:57
8	Kevin Lisska	United States (USA)	1:00:36	2:11	2:53:48	2:20	1:59:37	5:58:29
9	Paul Ambrose	Australia (AUS)	1:00:41	2:16	2:53:59	2:16	2:00:33	5:59:43
10	Huib Rost	Netherlands (NED)	1:05:41	1:58	2:57:21	2:02	1:55:29	6:02:32
11	Petr Vabrousek	Czech Republic (CZE)	1:11:21	2:34	2:54:32	2:23	1:53:47	6:04:36
12	Filip Kristl	Slovakia (SVK)	1:05:45	2:13	2:57:06	2:14	1:58:20	6:05:36
13	Esben Hovgaard	Denmark (DEN)	1:08:13	2:31	2:55:06	2:01	1:58:32	6:06:20
14	Stijn Demeulemeester	Belgium (BEL)	1:12:20	2:20	2:53:24	2:09	1:58:45	6:08:57
15	Ivan Tejero Vazquez	Spain (ESP)	1:00:40	2:23	3:02:11	2:29	2:01:24	6:09:06
16	Jamie Whyte	New Zealand (NZL)	1:05:43	2:20	2:56:57	2:14	2:01:59	6:09:13
17	Eanna McGrath	Ireland (IRL)	1:08:02	2:26	3:08:04	2:21	1:52:36	6:13:27
18	Andreas Borch	Denmark (DEN)	1:00:48	2:16	3:02:04	2:27	2:06:57	6:14:32
19	Remy Vasseur	Netherlands (NED)	1:05:39	2:20	3:00:21	2:24	2:04:00	6:14:44
20	Gabriele Pertusati	Italy (ITA)	1:04:57	2:29	2:55:07	2:43	2:12:06	6:17:19
21	Eddy Lamers	Netherlands (NED)	1:05:18	2:20	2:57:27	2:13	2:12:01	6:19:18
22	Jerzy Kasemier	Netherlands (NED)	1:05:19	2:24	2:57:13	2:15	2:13:36	6:20:47
23	Charly Loisel	France (FRA)	1:00:47	2:27	2:49:52	2:24	2:26:17	6:21:47
24	Andrew Hodges	United States (USA)	1:05:19	2:32	3:03:04	2:47	2:08:22	6:22:03
25	Teemu Lemmettyla	Finland (FIN)	1:15:38	2:44	3:02:45	2:19	2:00:11	6:23:36
26	Tomas Bednar	Czech Republic (CZE)	1:05:14	2:52	3:09:49	2:41	2:03:19	6:23:53
27	Federico Girasole	Italy (ITA)	1:08:01	2:47	3:07:33	2:47	2:03:53	6:25:00
28	Karol Dzalaj	Slovakia (SVK)	1:12:43	2:32	3:06:01	2:26	2:11:27	6:35:08
29	Brad Storm	South Africa (RSA)	1:00:41	2:26	2:57:21	2:59	2:32:58	6:36:24
30	Lucas Pretto	Brazil (BRA)	1:05:28	6:57	3:38:59	2:37	1:54:25	6:48:24
31	Anton Storm	South Africa (RSA)	1:00:25	2:28	3:09:28	4:59	2:34:26	6:51:44
32	Ted As	Sweden (SWE)	1:08:34	2:13	3:02:11	4:27	2:34:21	6:51:44
33	Rob Steegink	Netherlands (NED)	1:07:22	2:44	2:58:23	2:55	2:40:23	6:51:45
-	Arland Macasieb	Philippines (PHI)	1:18:57	3:19	3:10:01	3:44	2:13:31	eli.
-	Hervé Faure	France (FRA)	1:05:37	2:16	2:57:09	2:13	-	DNF
-	Jarmo Hast	Finland (FIN)	1:01:09	2:12	3:01:52	2:19	1:51:17	eli.
-	Peter Harnold	Slovenia (SLO)	1:07:36	2:31	3:07:41	4:43	2:14:02	eli.
-	Antonio Marcos De Souza Da Silva	Brazil (BRA)	1:05:22	2:33	-	-	-	DNF
-	Chris Bagg	United States (USA)	1:09:30	2:42	3:10:16	-	-	DNF
-	Clemente Alonso McKernan	Spain (ESP)	1:00:33	2:16	3:01:24	3:10	-	DNF
-	Erik-Simon Strijk	Netherlands (NED)	1:12:23	-	-	-	-	DNF
-	Gabriele Mazzetta	Italy (ITA)	1:05:40	2:31	-	-	-	DNF
-	Jens Koefoed	Denmark (DEN)	1:05:34	2:13	-	-	-	DNF
-	Jens Petersen Bach	Denmark (DEN)	1:05:34	2:21	-	-	-	DNF
-	Lance John Chapman	South Africa (RSA)	1:22:54	3:25	-	-	-	DNF
-	Pedro Gomes	Portugal (POR)	1:07:34	2:31	2:55:45	2:21	-	DNF
-	Teemu Toivanen	Finland (FIN)	1:05:31	2:16	-	-	-	DNF
Key : DNF - did not finish ; eli. - eliminated

=== Women ===
For the third successive year, the 21 finishers from 23 starters were led home by a Briton, Chrissie Wellington, who won by over seventeen minutes from Charlotte Kolters ^{(de)} with Wellington creating dominant performances on both bike and run. Leader after the swim, Lucie Zelenkova, faded to fourth place on the run leg, nineteen minutes behind Wellington.

Rank	Athlete	Nation	Swim	T1	Bike	T2	Run	Overall time
1st place, gold medalist(s)	Chrissie Wellington	Great Britain (GBR)	1:10:05	2:41	3:03:19	2:23	1:54:18	6:12:44
2nd place, silver medalist(s)	Charlotte Kolters ^{(de)}	Denmark (DEN)	1:07:57	2:42	3:09:34	2:29	2:07:34	6:30:15
3rd place, bronze medalist(s)	Yvonne Van Vlerken	Netherlands (NED)	1:19:40	2:28	3:11:35	2:28	1:55:46	6:31:56
4	Lucie Zelenkova	Czech Republic (CZE)	1:07:15	2:46	3:11:36	2:53	2:09:30	6:33:59
5	Ingrid van Lubek	Netherlands (NED)	1:10:07	3:13	3:16:04	2:47	2:08:24	6:40:33
6	Tiina Boman	Finland (FIN)	1:13:32	2:41	3:17:34	2:27	2:05:16	6:41:27
7		Denmark (DEN)	1:19:37	2:36	3:17:14	2:36	2:00:15	6:42:17
8	Ana Lidia Borba	Brazil (BRA)	1:10:11	3:02	3:20:39	2:46	2:08:11	6:44:47
9	Tine Deckers	Belgium (BEL)	1:17:50	2:55	3:09:42	2:42	2:11:50	6:44:55
10	Martina Dogana	Italy (ITA)	1:19:34	2:36	3:16:52	2:27	2:07:33	6:49:00
11	Ann Banke	Denmark (DEN)	1:17:02	2:40	3:13:56	2:59	2:13:57	6:50:32
12	Cora Vlot	Netherlands (NED)	1:14:46	3:04	3:16:03	3:01	2:14:52	6:51:44
13	Kelly Couch	United States (USA)	1:10:26	3:15	3:25:36	3:54	2:11:44	6:54:52
14	Mirjam Weerd	Netherlands (NED)	1:12:23	2:47	3:18:43	2:50	2:27:18	7:04:00
15	Heidi Grimm	United States (USA)	1:21:37	2:41	3:24:44	2:37	2:17:00	7:08:37
16	Maria Alfonsa Sella	Italy (ITA)	1:21:58	3:04	3:26:52	2:43	2:16:11	7:10:46
17	Liz Vitai	United States (USA)	1:21:41	3:28	3:25:26	2:47	2:18:04	7:11:23
18	Elisabetta Stampi	Italy (ITA)	1:31:54	3:43	3:26:55	2:46	2:12:16	7:17:31
19	Kristin Hewitt	New Zealand (NZL)	1:19:42	3:05	3:36:47	3:35	2:35:25	7:38:31
20	Florence Chretien	United States (USA)	1:19:34	3:18	3:36:53	4:10	2:45:38	7:49:30
21	Alina Ranceva	Lithuania (LTU)	1:31:32	3:20	3:46:35	3:13	2:35:22	8:00:00
-	Delphine Pelletier	France (FRA)	1:08:14	2:40	3:14:29	2:34	-	DNF
-	Sara Sig	Denmark (DEN)	1:16:03	3:18	-	-	-	DNF
Key : DNF - did not finish ; DNS - did not start

== Age-group Championships ==
Amateur age-group championship races were held as part of the event. The medalists in each class are set out below:

Event	Gold		Silver		Bronze	
Men
18-19	Tjardo Visser; Netherlands	7:22:42				
20-24	Georg Potrebitsch; Germany	6:09:21	Nils Blumenthal; Germany	6:39:40	Alex Fairman; Great Britain	6:43:24
25-29	Dion Harrison; Great Britain	6:18:58	Frederik De Vreese; Belgium	6:21:43	Sean Schnur; United States	6:40:32
30-34	Martijn Boot; Netherlands	6:21:47	Klaus Schlüter; Germany	6:26:50	Guido Kwakkel; Netherlands	6:36:32
35-39	Heiko Tewes; Germany	6:18:02	Jens Gydesen; Denmark	6:39:38	Wim Korving; Netherlands	6:46:26
40-44	Oliver Bergmann; Germany	6:25:44	René Poppe; Netherlands	6:27:50	Erwin De Bruijn; Netherlands	6:31:34
45-49	Menno Iedema; Netherlands	6:34:31	Steffen Lüders; Denmark	6:39:49	John Beerendonk; Netherlands	6:48:58
50-54	Aart Van Wijk; Netherlands	6:43:45	Rob Van Zanten; Netherlands	6:45:33	Klaas De Leth; Netherlands	7:00:04
55-59	Hans-Ludwig Sattler; Germany	7:07:47	Romain Ossieur; Belgium	7:14:52	Ad Schoonderbeek; Netherlands	7:21:40
60-64	Mink Zeilstra; Netherlands	7:14:31	Hans Van Der Linden; Netherlands	7:16:48	Henk Knol; Netherlands	7:18:29
65-69	Jochen Sackel; Germany	7:49:40	Daniel Escoffier; France	8:09:42	Gerhard Niessner; Germany	8:28:35
70-74	Horst Greb; Germany	9:33:52	John Weber; United States	9:34:06	David Lewington; Great Britain	9:43:34
Women
18-19	Aimee Warnke; United States	9:24:12				
20-24	Natsha Lydiard; New Zealand	7:50:34	Federica Ferrari; Italy	7:56:06	Carmen Valerius; Germany	7:58:23
25-29	Fiona Eagles; New Zealand	7:11:33	Amelie Chehensse; France	7:12:41	Nicole Gross; United States	7:23:09
30-34	Silvia Tremoleda Serrano; Spain	7:23:00	Julie Payne; Great Britain	7:30:24	Marleen Vos; Netherlands	7:31:52
35-39	Ann Ciaverella; United States	7:08:46	Gonny Rosendaal; Netherlands	7:16:06	Jeanet Spigt; Netherlands	7:30:29
40-44	Sabine Greipel; Austria	7:17:31	Birgit Jacobi; Germany	7:25:13	Terry Walters; United States	7:29:46
45-49	Marion Waid; Germany	7:10:46	Cornelia Roth; Germany	7:41:51	Françoise Theate; Belgium	7:48:04
50-54	Marijke Zeekant; Netherlands	7:21:34	Hedla Lopes; Brazil	7:39:09	Beverley Dunne; Canada	8:12:07
55-59	Karin Schulz; Germany	9:00:13	Senna S. Madsen; Denmark	9:09:45	Heather Allison; New Zealand	9:19:27
60-64	Mary Denitto; United States	9:41:18				
