= World Triathlon Long Distance Championships =

Annual triathlon race

The World Triathlon Long Distance Championships is a triathlon event held annually since 1994. The championships involve races featuring a continuous swim-cycle-run, over distances varying between that of an Olympic-distance and an Iron-distance triathlon race. The championships are organised by World Triathlon.

== History ==
=== 1983 and the Triathlon International de Nice ===
The Ironman Triathlon Championship event in Kona, Hawaii had created a movement for ultra-endurance triathlon in the United States, but Europe, while providing many competitive athletes, had lagged behind in hosting its own ultra-endurance events. The International Management Group (IMG) decided to create a European corollary to the Ironman and selected Monaco for the first event in 1982, but the death of Princess Grace of Monaco forced a move to Nice, where a truncated version of the Ironman distance was held in 1982.

The Triathlon International de Nice, (which eventually became Ironman France in 2005) was successful from its creation and became recognised as the major ultra-endurance triathlon in Europe from 1983 onwards, with the distance extended from its truncated beginnings of 1982. From 1983 until the creation of the ITU Long Distance Triathlon World Championships in 1994, the Triathlon International de Nice was widely regarded as an unofficial world championship in long-distance triathlon, alongside the longer Ironman event in Kona, Hawaii.

=== Foundaton of the ITU and official world championships ===
ITU built on the back of the successful event in Nice, and three of the first four official ITU World Championships from 1994 to 1997 were simultaneously editions of the Triathlon International.

=== Medalists at the Triathlon International 1983-1993 ===
Prior to the founding of the International Triathlon Union, the dominant athlete at the unofficial 'world championships' in Nice was the American Ironman legend Mark Allen winning both the inaugural shorter event in 1982, and a further nine 'unofficial' world titles from eleven editions, to go with his six Ironman World titles. The women's races were shared more evenly, before the Zimbabwean Paula Newby-Fraser won four in a row between 1989 and 1992, to add to her record eight Ironman world championship gold medals.

Neither Allen nor Newby-Fraser would win an 'official' ITU world long-distance title from when they became available in 1994 and World Triathlon, as ITU became known, does not recognise the 'unofficial' pre-1994 world championships as part of its championship lineage.

Year	Gold		Silver		Bronze	
Men
1983	Mark Allen (USA)	6:04:51	Dave Scott (USA)	6:08:15	Scott Molina (USA)	6:11:27
1984	Mark Allen (USA)	6:05:22	Dave Scott (USA)	6:07:58	Scott Tinley (USA)	5:56:22
1985	Mark Allen (USA)	5:53:13	Scott Tinley (USA)	5:55:52	Rob Barel (NED)	6:00:49
1986	Mark Allen (USA)	5:46:10	Scott Molina (USA)	5:55:09	Georges Hoover (USA)	6:45:50
1987	Rick Wells (NZL)	5:59:53	Scott Tinley (USA)	6:07:23	Hervé Niquet (FRA)	6:10:20
1988	Rob Barel (NED)	6:05:06	Scott Molina (USA)	6:05:42	Scott Tinley (USA)	6:12:54
1989	Mark Allen (USA)	5:54:31	Rob Barel (NED)	6:01:17	Mike Pigg (USA)	6:03:59
1990	Mark Allen (USA)	5:50:52	Mike Pigg (USA)	6:00:07	Rob Barel (NED)	6:02:46
1991	Mark Allen (USA)	5:54:12	Rob Barel (NED)	5:59:46	Yves Cordier (FRA)	6:08:45
1992	Mark Allen (USA)	5:59:43	Yves Cordier (FRA)	6:00:50	Rob Barel (NED)	6:08:49
1993	Mark Allen (USA)	6:05:59	Simon Lessing (GBR)	6:10:55	Rob Barel (NED)	6:12:26
Women
1983	Linda Buchanan (USA)	7:06:03	Jann Girard (USA)	7:18:19	Kathleen MacCartney (USA)	7:23:24
1984	Colleen Cannon (USA)	7:05:15	Julie Moss (USA)	7:07:01	Jann Girard (USA)	7:28:02
1985	Erin Baker (NZL)	6:37:21	Linda Buchanan (USA)	6:46:33	Sylviane Puntous (CAN)	6:54:00
1986	Linda Buchanan (USA)	6:50:56	Sarah Cooper (GBR)	7:04:45	Lieve Cappaert-Paulus (BEL)	7:09:39
1987	Kirsten Hanssen (USA)	6:54:27	Colleen Cannon (USA)	6:55:02	Paula Newby-Fraser (ZIM)	6:56:35
1988	Erin Baker (NZL)	6:27:06	Jan Wanklyn (AUS)	7:07:22	Sarah Cooper (GBR)	7:09:17
1989	Paula Newby-Fraser (ZIM)	6:49:42	Sylviane Puntous (CAN)	6:51:45	Patricia Puntous (CAN)	7:01:08
1990	Paula Newby-Fraser (ZIM)	6:36:19	Kirsten Hanssen Ames (USA)	6:46:01	Thea Sybesma (NED)	6:49:33
1991	Paula Newby-Fraser (ZIM)	6:40:35	Isabelle Mouthon-Michellys (FRA)	6:51:27	Thea Sybesma (NED)	6:57:40
1992	Paula Newby-Fraser (ZIM)	6:43:41	Donna Peters (USA)	7:03:17	Sylviane Puntous (CAN)	7:05:35
1993	Isabelle Mouthon-Michellys (FRA)	6:44:36	Sue Latshaw (USA)	6:55:11	Beatrice Mouthon (FRA)	7:06:08

=== World Triathlon Multisports Championships ===
Following the return of racing after the covid pandemic in 2021, World Triathlon combined the event with other non-Olympic multi-sport events in the World Triathlon Multisports Championships, but the races themselves retained their identity and title as the World Triathlon Long Distance Championships.

== Championship venues ==
Edition	Year	Date	Location	Race distances (kilometres)		
Edition	Year	Date	Location	Swim	Cycle	Run
1	1994	26 June	(France) Nice	4	120	32
2	1995	1 October	(France) Nice	4	120	32
3	1996	7 September	(United States) Muncie	1.9	90	21.6
4	1997	8 June	(France) Nice	4	120	30
5	1998	5 September	(Japan) Sado Island	3	136	28
6	1999	11 July	(Sweden) Säter	4	120	30
7	2000	18 June	(France) Nice	4	120	30
8	2001	5 August	(Denmark) Fredericia	3.8	180	42
9	2002	22 September	(France) Nice	4	120	30
10	2003	11 May	(Spain) Ibiza	4	120	30
11	2004	3 July	(Sweden) Säter	4	120	30
12	2005	7 August	(Denmark) Fredericia	4	120	30
13	2006	19 November	(Australia) Canberra	4	120	30
14	2007	15 July	(France) Lorient	3	80	20
15	2008	31 August	(Netherlands) Almere	4	120	30
16	2009	25 October	(Australia) Perth	3	80	20
17	2010	31 July	(Germany) Immenstadt	4	130	30
18	2011	5 November	(United States) Henderson	0 (Note: Swim stage cancelled due to cold weather)	120	30
19	2012	29 July	(Spain) Vitoria-Gasteiz	4	120	30
20	2013	1 June	(France) Belfort	(Note: Swim stage changed to a 9.5k run and overall course shortened due to cold weather.)	87	20
21	2014	21 September	(China) Weihai	4	120	20
22	2015	27 June	(Sweden) Motala	1.5 (Note: Swim shortened due to water temperature)	120	30
23	2016	24 September	(United States) Oklahoma City	4	120	30
24	2017	27 August	(Canada) Penticton	3	120	30
25	2018	14 July	(Denmark) Fyn	3	120	30
26	2019	4 May	(Spain) Pontevedra	1.5 (Note: Swim shortened due to water temperature)	110	30
-	2020	cancelled due to covid				
27	2021	12 September	(Netherlands) Almere	3.8	180.2	42
28	2022	21 August	(Slovakia) Šamorín	2	79.8	17.9
29	2023	7 May	(Spain) Ibiza	3	116	30
30	2024	25 August	(Australia) Townsville	3	114	30
31	2025	29 June	(Spain) Pontevedra	3	120	30
32	2026	22 November	(United Arab Emirates) Abu Dhabi	3	120	30

== Medallists ==
=== Men's ===
Year	Gold	Silver	Bronze
1994	Rob Barel (NED)	Lothar Leder (GER)	Yves Cordier (FRA)
1995	Simon Lessing (GBR)	Luc Van Lierde (BEL)	Peter Reid (CAN)
1996	Greg Welch (AUS)	Luc Van Lierde (BEL)	Spencer Smith (GBR)
1997	Luc Van Lierde (BEL)	Rob Barel (NED)	Jean-Christophe Guinchard (SUI)
1998	Luc Van Lierde (BEL)	Rob Barel (NED)	Peter Sandvang (DEN)
1999	Peter Sandvang (DEN)	Torbjørn Sindballe (DEN)	Massimo Guadagni (ITA)
2000	Peter Sandvang (DEN)	Cyrille Neveu (FRA)	François Chabaud (FRA)
2001	Peter Sandvang (DEN)	Rasmus Henning (DEN)	Jonas Colting (SWE)
2002	Cyrille Neveu (FRA)	Torbjørn Sindballe (DEN)	Rutger Beke (BEL)
2003	Eneko Llanos (ESP)	Rutger Beke (BEL)	Xavier Le Floch (FRA)
2004	Torbjørn Sindballe (DEN)	Jonas Colting (SWE)	Marino Vanhoenacker (BEL)
2005	Viktor Zyemtsev (UKR)	Marino Vanhoenacker (BEL)	Xavier Le Floch (FRA)
2006	Torbjørn Sindballe (DEN)	Craig Alexander (AUS)	Marino Vanhoenacker (BEL)
2007	Julien Loy (FRA)	Xavier Le Floch (FRA)	Sébastien Berlier (FRA)
2008	Julien Loy (FRA)	François Chabaud (FRA)	Martin Jensen (DEN)
2009	Timothy O'Donnell (USA)	Sylvain Sudrie (FRA)	Martin Jensen (DEN)
2010	Sylvain Sudrie (FRA)	Timothy O'Donnell (USA)	François Chabaud (FRA)
2011	Jordan Rapp (USA)	Joe Gambles (AUS)	Sylvain Sudrie (FRA)
2012	Chris McCormack (AUS)	Eneko Llanos (ESP)	Dirk Bockel (LUX)
2013	Bertrand Billard (FRA)	Terenzo Bozzone (NZL)	Dirk Bockel (LUX)
2014	Bertrand Billard (FRA)	Sylvain Sudrie (FRA)	Cyril Viennot (FRA)
2015	Cyril Viennot (FRA)	Martin Jensen (DEN)	Joe Skipper (GBR)
2016	Sylvain Sudrie (FRA)	Cyril Viennot (FRA)	Matt Chrabot (USA)
2017	Lionel Sanders (CAN)	Joshua Amberger (AUS)	Joe Gambles (AUS)
2018	Pablo Dapena (ESP)	Ruedi Wild (SUI)	Marko Albert (EST)
2019	Javier Gómez (ESP)	Pablo Dapena (ESP)	Jaroslav Kovačič (SLO)
2021	Kristian Høgenhaug (DEN)	Jesper Svensson (SWE)	Reinaldo Colucci (BRA)
2022	Pierre Le Corre (FRA)	Florian Angert (GER)	Frederic Funk (GER)
2023	Clément Mignon (FRA)	Antonio Benito (ESP)	Matt Trautman (RSA)
2024	Antonio Benito (ESP)	Steven Mckenna (AUS)	Louis Naeyaert (BEL)
2025	Antonio Benito (ESP)	Dylan Magnien (FRA)	William Draper (GBR)
2026	Wilhelm Hirsch (GER)	William Draper (GBR)	Wojciech Kopyciński (POL)

=== Women's ===
Year	Gold	Silver	Bronze
1994	Isabelle Mouthon-Michellys (FRA)	Karen Smyers (USA)	Lydie Reuze (FRA)
1995	Jenny Rose (NZL)	Ute Schaefer (GER)	Ines Estedt (GER)
1996	Karen Smyers (USA)	Sophie Delemer (FRA)	Suzanne Nielsen (DEN)
1997	Ines Estedt (GER)	Isabelle Mouthon-Michellys (FRA)	Virginia Berasategui (ESP)
1998	Rina Hill (AUS)	Lena Wahlqvist (SWE)	Megumi Shigaki (JPN)
1999	Suzanne Nielsen (DEN)	Joanne King (AUS)	Jasmine Haemmerle (AUT)
2000	Isabelle Mouthon-Michellys (FRA)	Natascha Badmann (SUI)	Daniela Locarno (ITA)
2001	Lisbeth Kristensen (DEN)	Lena Wahlqvist (SWE)	Suzanne Nielsen (DEN)
2002	Ines Estedt (GER)	Kathleen Smet (BEL)	Virginia Berasategui (ESP)
2003	Virginia Berasategui (ESP)	Ana Burgos (ESP)	Sione Jongstra (NED)
2004	Tamara Kozulina (UKR)	Lisbeth Kristensen (DEN)	Sione Jongstra (NED)
2005	Kathleen Smet (BEL)	Mirinda Carfrae (AUS)	Tina Boman (FIN)
2006	Bella Comerford (GBR)	Edith Niederfriniger (ITA)	Johanna Daumas (FRA)
2007	Leanda Cave (GBR)	Erika Csomor (HUN)	Catriona Morrison (GBR)
2008	Chrissie Wellington (GBR)	Charlotte Kolters (DEN)	Yvonne van Vlerken (NED)
2009	Jodie Swallow (GBR)	Rebekah Keat (AUS)	Delphine Pelletier (FRA)
2010	Caroline Steffen (SUI)	Yvonne van Vlerken (NED)	Virginia Berasategui (ESP)
2011	Rachel Joyce (GBR)	Leanda Cave (GBR)	Meredith Kessler (USA)
2012	Caroline Steffen (SUI)	Camilla Pedersen (DEN)	Jodie Swallow (GBR)
2013	Melissa Hauschildt (AUS)	Camilla Pedersen (DEN)	Rachel McBride (CAN)
2014	Camilla Pedersen (DEN)	Kaisa Lehtonen (FIN)	Andrea Hewitt (NZL)
2015	Mary Beth Ellis (USA)	Camilla Pedersen (DEN)	Kaisa Lehtonen (FIN)
2016	Jodie Swallow (GBR)	Caroline Steffen (SUI)	Rachel McBride (CAN)
2017	Sarah Crowley (AUS)	Helle Frederiksen (DEN)	Heather Wurtele (CAN)
2018	Helle Frederiksen (DEN)	Bárbara Riveros (CHI)	Annabel Luxford (AUS)
2019	Alexandra Tondeur (BEL)	Judith Corachán (ESP)	Anna Noguera (ESP)
2021	Sarissa de Vries (NED)	Manon Genêt (FRA)	Michelle Vesterby (DEN)
2022	Lucy Charles-Barclay (GBR)	Emma Pallant (GBR)	Sarissa de Vries (NED)
2023	Marjolaine Pierré (FRA)	Sara Svensk (SWE)	Gurutze Frades (ESP)
2024	Charlène Clavel (FRA)	Marta Łagownik (POL)	Julie Iemmolo (FRA)
2025	Marjolaine Pierré (FRA)	Marta Łagownik (POL)	Charlène Clavel (FRA)
2026	Marjolaine Pierré (FRA)	Caroline Pohle (GER)	Anne-Sophie Pierre (FRA)
