= 2019 ITU Long Distance Triathlon World Championships =

International sports competition

World Long Distance Triathlon Championships
- Location: Pontevedra, Spain
- Date: May 4 2019

The 2019 ITU Long Distance Triathlon World Championships was a triathlon competition held in Pontevedra, Spain, on May 4 2019 and organized by the International Triathlon Union, now World Triathlon. It was the last edition held under the ITU branding.

The elite races for men and consisted of a 1.5 km (0.93 mi) swim, 110 km (68 mi) bike and 30 km (19 mi) run, longer than the standard 1.5 km swim, 40 km bike and 10 km run associated with the World Triathlon Championship Series and the Olympic Games, but shorter than the classic Ironman Triathlon event. The swim element had been shortened in line with ITU regulations due to concerns over the water temperature.

The championship was held as part of the 2019 ITU World Multi-sports Championships which crowned several world champions in non Olympic distance events governed by the then-ITU.

The 2020 edition was cancelled in April 2020 due to the covid pandemic, along with other World Triathlon/ITU activisties. The next edition would be the 2021 World Triathlon Long Distance Championships in Almere, Netherlands.

== Medal Summary ==
Event	Gold		Silver		Bronze	
Men	Javier Gomez Noya; Spain	5:05:39	Pablo Dapena Gonzalez; Spain	5:11:21	Jaroslav Kovacic; Slovenia	5:12:02
Women	Alexandra Tondeur; Belgium	5:48:01	Judith Corachan Vaquero; Spain	5:50:06	Anna Noguera; Spain	5:51:33

== Results ==
The following are the results of the elite races:

=== Men ===
Rank	Athlete	Swim	T1	Bike	T2	Run	Overall time
1st place, gold medalist(s)	Javier Gomez Noya (ESP)	20:23	2:53	2:52:35	2:00	1:47:50	5:05:39
2nd place, silver medalist(s)	Pablo Dapena Gonzalez (ESP)	20:37	2:57	2:52:17	1:53	1:53:39	5:11:21
3rd place, bronze medalist(s)	Jaroslav Kovacic (SLO)	21:49	2:59	2:51:00	1:43	1:54:33	5:12:02
4	Kristian Høgenhaug (DEN)	21:47	3:08	2:50:57	2:04	1:54:16	5:12:09
5	Antony Costes (FRA)	22:14	2:59	2:50:40	1:54	1:56:33	5:14:18
6	Daniel Bækkegård (DEN)	20:34	2:54	2:59:29	2:29	1:49:40	5:15:04
7	Terenzo Bozzone (NZL)	21:19	3:04	2:51:19	1:29	1:58:14	5:15:22
8	Miki Taagholt (DEN)	21:02	2:45	2:54:01	1:55	1:55:48	5:15:29
9	Andrey Bryukhankov (RUS)	20:52	2:50	2:56:34	1:54	1:55:32	5:17:41
10	Sebastien Fraysse (FRA)	20:36	3:00	2:53:02	2:02	2:00:02	5:18:40
11	Alessandro De Gasperi (ITA)	22:12	3:03	3:02:41	2:23	1:49:28	5:19:45
12	Gustavo Rodriguez Iglesias (ESP)	24:38	3:18	2:55:18	2:15	1:55:57	5:21:24
13	Lukas Kocar (CZE)	22:12	3:12	2:55:14	2:19	2:00:18	5:23:13
14	Denis Sketako (SLO)	25:03	3:11	3:00:28	1:53	1:52:58	5:23:31
15	Diego Van Looy (BEL)	29:20	3:28	3:02:39	2:22	1:48:26	5:26:14
16	Aliaksandr Vasilevich (BLR)	21:56	3:21	3:03:29	1:51	1:56:31	5:27:05
17	Ander Okamika Bengoetxea (ESP)	22:59	3:14	2:58:55	2:36	2:00:32	5:28:14
18	Cyril Viennot (FRA)	23:01	2:59	2:56:55	1:57	2:04:10	5:29:00
19	Oliver Korfitsen (DEN)	21:43	3:11	3:04:08	2:30	2:03:29	5:34:59
20	Petr Soukup (CZE)	24:36	3:12	3:06:48	2:00	1:58:44	5:35:18
21	Nikolay Yaroshenko (RUS)	21:53	3:25	3:10:15	2:10	2:02:43	5:40:25
22	Diederik Scheltinga (NED)	26:33	3:17	3:09:39	2:07	2:03:13	5:44:48
23	Hiroki Inbe (JPN)	26:26	3:40	3:13:35	2:27	2:00:31	5:46:37
24	Péter Szilágyi (HUN)	23:00	3:04	3:14:18	2:15	2:07:01	5:49:36
25	Ander Irigoien Egia (ESP)	26:33	3:13	3:16:39	2:07	2:03:40	5:52:11
26	Tjardo Visser (NED)	24:32	3:23	3:15:56	2:10	2:09:44	5:55:43
27	Ivan Menshykov (UKR)	22:15	3:17	3:12:56	3:04	2:15:34	5:57:03
28	Jure Majdič (SLO)	22:10	3:24	3:05:23	2:04	2:24:14	5:57:13
29	Viktor Aloshyn (RUS)	22:14	3:19	3:24:16	2:14	2:13:24	6:05:24
30	Grigoris Skoularikis (GRE)	30:01	5:36	3:23:23	4:25	2:12:38	6:16:01
31	Alexandru Diaconu (ROU)	27:19	3:30	3:39:41	2:29	2:14:41	6:27:40
32	Thomas Roos (USA)	21:39	3:57	3:23:11	1:53	2:38:23	6:29:01
-	Albert Moreno Molins (ESP)	22:18	3:14	2:50:21	1:59	-	DNF
-	Mathias Lyngsø Petersen (DEN)	21:43	3:09	2:53:16	2:01	-	DNF
-	Ruedi Wild (SUI)	21:39	3:12	2:51:32	1:55	-	DNF
-	Ivan Risti (ITA)	22:10	3:17	3:13:15	1:58	-	DNF
-	Timothy Van Houtem (BEL)	-	-	-	-	-	DNS
Key : DNF - did not finish ; DNS - did not start

=== Women ===
Rank	Athlete	Swim	T1	Bike	T2	Run	Overall time
1st place, gold medalist(s)	Alexandra Tondeur (BEL)	26:21	2:58	3:10:27	2:41	2:05:36	5:48:01
2nd place, silver medalist(s)	Judith Corachan Vaquero (ESP)	25:15	3:23	3:15:18	1:41	2:04:30	5:50:06
3rd place, bronze medalist(s)	Anna Noguera (ESP)	25:09	3:18	3:15:28	2:17	2:05:23	5:51:33
4	Manon Genet (FRA)	26:17	3:21	3:09:40	2:01	2:13:00	5:54:16
5	Maja Stage Nielsen (DEN)	25:31	3:06	3:20:33	1:57	2:06:08	5:57:13
6	Emma Bilham (SUI)	25:00	3:33	3:16:38	1:48	2:10:54	5:57:51
7	Åsa Lundström (SWE)	28:43	3:11	3:21:08	1:59	2:07:55	6:02:54
8	Gurutze Frades Larralde (ESP)	30:09	4:33	3:25:49	2:09	2:04:52	6:07:30
9	Saleta Castro (ESP)	25:12	3:29	3:29:38	2:11	2:07:54	6:08:23
10	Maki Nishioka (JPN)	26:14	3:26	3:33:04	2:04	2:06:36	6:11:23
11	Ewa Bugdol (POL)	25:13	3:43	3:29:23	2:03	2:18:00	6:18:20
12	Sophie Bubb (GBR)	31:30	4:21	3:32:19	2:30	2:11:35	6:22:13
13	Maria Pujol (ESP)	25:22	3:36	3:37:12	2:51	2:21:02	6:30:01
14	Helena Kotopulu (CZE)	33:56	5:04	3:35:19	2:18	2:15:32	6:32:07
15	Ana Filipa Santos (POR)	26:18	4:05	3:40:37	2:01	2:23:44	6:36:43
16	Akiko Inaba (JPN)	25:33	3:26	3:39:42	2:08	2:35:03	6:45:50
17	Miriam Van Reijen (NED)	31:30	8:27	3:57:27	2:45	2:06:18	6:46:27
18	Deniz Dimaki (GRE)	30:10	4:52	3:58:24	2:14	2:24:19	6:59:57
19	Mariia Velykotska (UKR)	30:02	3:54	3:58:56	2:19	2:40:50	7:15:59
-	Camilla Pedersen (DEN)	24:20	3:40	3:11:17	2:18	-	DNF
-	Vanessa Pereira (POR)	30:51	4:31	-	-	-	DNF
-	Katharina Grohmann (GER)	35:00	3:31	-	-	-	DNF
-	Jenny Nilsson (SWE)	30:02	3:24	3:37:30	2:05	2:21:06	DSQ
Key : DNF - did not finish ; DNS - did not start; DSQ - disqualified

== Para triathlon and Age grade ==
In addition to the elite races, a series of age-grade and selected para-triathlon championship races were held as part of the event. The winners of each classification are listed below:

Classification	Name	Nation	Overall time
18-19 Male AG	Lucas Deer	Australia	06:59:13
20-24 Female AG	Rebecca Duxbury	Great Britain	06:36:30
20-24 Male AG	Michael Ferreira	South Africa	05:58:44
25-29 Female AG	Josie Rawes	Great Britain	06:41:27
25-29 Male AG	Tine Lavrenčič	Slovenia	05:44:22
30-34 Female AG	Hélène Vander Massen	Belgium	06:47:26
30-34 Male AG	Neil Eddy	Great Britain	05:42:10
35-39 Female AG	Vanesa Villar Dieguez	Spain	07:44:52
35-39 Male AG	Bård Ole Thorsen	Norway	05:58:40
40-44 Female AG	Tamara Larizza	Switzerland	06:51:50
40-44 Male AG	Lionel Roye	France	05:51:26
45-49 Female AG	Benita Gras-Thompson	United States	06:47:16
45-49 Male AG	Jaime Menendez De Luarca Zumalacarregui	Spain	05:51:49
50-54 Female AG	Louella Yorke	Great Britain	07:05:56
50-54 Male AG	Arnaud Selukov	France	06:04:15
55-59 Female AG	Catherine Houseaux	France	06:58:58
55-59 Male AG	Roger T. Canham	Great Britain	06:19:23
60-64 Female AG	Nelly Wojtasinski	France	07:33:49
60-64 Male AG	Ole Loumann	Denmark	06:58:07
65-69 Female AG	Suzanne Mink	United States	10:51:47
65-69 Male AG	Michiel Jonker	Belgium	07:12:47
70-74 Male AG	Richard File	Great Britain	08:26:12
75-79 Male AG	Manuel Jose Cruces Prado	Spain	10:58:46
PTS4 Men	Jesus Miguel Sánchez Felipe	Spain	09:04:00
PTS5 Men	Antonio Franco Salas	Spain	08:43:05
PTVI Men	Daniel Llambrich Gabriel (B2)	Spain	06:43:10
PTWC Men	Antonio Daniel Muller (H1)	Germany	08:43:07
Key : AG - age-grade championship : PTS - Para triathlon standing : PTV - Para triathlon visually impaired : PTWC - Paratriathlon hand bike/wheelchair class
