= 2017 ITU Long Distance Triathlon World Championships =

International sports competition

World Long Distance Triathlon Championships
- Location: Penticton, Canada
- Date: 27 August 2017

Champions
- Men: Lionel Sanders (CAN)
- Women: Sarah Crowley (AUS)

The 2017 ITU Long Distance Triathlon World Championships was a triathlon competition held in Penticton in Canada on 27 August 2017 and organized by the International Triathlon Union, now World Triathlon. The Elite races for men and consisted of a 3 km (1.9 mi) swim, 120 km (75 mi) bike and 30 km (19 mi) run, longer than the standard 1.5 km swim, 40 km bike and 10 km run associated with the World Triathlon Championship Series and the Olympic Games, but shorter than the classic Ironman Triathlon event.

The championship was held as part of the 2017 ITU World Multi-sports Championships which crowned several world champions in non Olympic distance events governed by the then-ITU.

== Medal Summary ==
Event	Gold		Silver		Bronze	
Men	Lionel Sanders; Canada	5:20:36	Joshua Amberger; Australia	5:22:09	Joe Gambles; Australia	5:26:23
Women	Sarah Crowley; Australia	5:51:23	Helle Frederiksen; Denmark	5:55:04	Heather Wurtele; Canada	5:55:51

== Results ==
The following are the results of the elite races:

=== Men ===
Home athlete Lionel Sanders overcame a puncture on the course to claim a first ITU Long distance world title.

Rank	Athlete	Swim	T1	Bike	T2	Run	Overall time
1st place, gold medalist(s)	Lionel Sanders (CAN)	40:40	1:43	2:51:12	1:28	1:45:35	5:20:36
2nd place, silver medalist(s)	Joshua Amberger (AUS)	36:29	1:49	2:48:57	1:32	1:53:23	5:22:09
3rd place, bronze medalist(s)	Joe Gambles (AUS)	40:02	1:36	2:52:56	1:36	1:50:15	5:26:23
4	Andy Potts (USA)	38:09	1:37	2:56:58	1:24	1:49:19	5:27:25
5	Sylvain Sudrie (FRA)	38:36	1:32	2:50:35	1:24	1:57:44	5:29:49
6	Drew Scott (USA)	39:54	1:30	2:53:11	1:24	1:56:23	5:32:19
7	Francisco Serrano Plowell (MEX)	39:59	2:10	3:01:34	1:34	1:50:51	5:36:05
8	Jeff Symonds (CAN)	40:49	1:59	3:00:40	1:27	1:52:16	5:37:08
9	Mark Buckingham (GBR)	38:15	1:24	3:02:02	1:38	1:55:31	5:38:48
10	Paul Ambrose (AUS)	1:04:32	n/k	n/k	n/k	2:03:43	5:40:56
11	Nathan Killam (CAN)	43:19	1:28	2:57:51	1:34	1:59:26	5:43:36
12	Chris Bagg (USA)	40:46	2:13	3:03:15	1:38	2:01:49	5:49:40
13	Denis Sketako (SLO)	43:20	1:50	3:08:46	1:34	1:55:17	5:50:44
14	Philippe Lamberty (LUX)	40:42	1:56	3:06:17	1:35	2:03:15	5:53:44
15	Kuniaki Takahama (JPN)	39:57	2:09	3:27:17	1:51	2:11:57	6:23:09
16	Jordan Bryden (CAN)	38:40	1:43	3:17:01	2:01	2:27:28	6:26:51
-	Julian Beuchert (GER)	40:49	2:00	2:04:42	6:04	-	DNF
-	Ben Collins (USA)	38:13	1:53	3:08:22	1:55	-	DNF
-	Elmar Heger (GER)	43:22	2:07	3:39:31	3:01	-	DNF
-	Cyril Viennot (FRA)	38:37	1:37	-	-	-	DNF
-	Peru Alfaro San Ildefonso (ESP)	38:15	1:46	-	-	-	DNF
-	Pablo Dapena Gonzalez (ESP)	36:31	2:05	3:02:41	6:27	-	DSQ
-	Sebastian Norberg (SWE)	43:19	1:36	2:58:46	1:30	2:02:36	DSQ
-	Bertrand Billard (FRA)	-	-	-	-	-	DNS
Key : DNF - did not finish ; DNS - did not start; n/k : not recorded

=== Women ===
Australia's Sarah Crowley won her first world title on the back of winning Ironman Championships in both Europe and Asia, overtaking Helle Frederiksen of Denmark and home hope Heather Wurtele on the final run leg.

Rank	Athlete	Swim	T1	Bike	T2	Run	Overall time
1st place, gold medalist(s)	Sarah Crowley (AUS)	42:56	1:58	3:09:24	1:30	1:55:37	5:51:23
2nd place, silver medalist(s)	Helle Frederiksen (DEN)	39:31	1:40	3:10:41	1:21	2:01:53	5:55:04
3rd place, bronze medalist(s)	Heather Wurtele (CAN)	42:55	1:44	3:09:40	1:34	2:00:00	5:55:51
4	Kaisa Sali (FIN)	44:54	1:48	3:12:07	1:40	2:00:49	6:01:16
5	Leanda Cave (GBR)	39:33	1:53	3:12:55	2:00	2:08:24	6:04:44
6	Rachel McBride (CAN)	39:38	1:43	3:16:19	1:41	2:08:05	6:07:24
7	Camilla Pedersen (DEN)	39:37	1:43	3:13:00	1:43	2:11:46	6:07:46
8	Jen Annett (CAN)	45:23	1:48	3:12:29	1:26	2:09:41	6:10:44
9	Melissa Hauschildt (AUS)	45:22	1:54	3:14:08	1:15	2:10:24	6:13:01
10	Jennifer Spieldenner (USA)	39:28	1:49	3:16:32	1:35	2:15:24	6:14:46
11	Skye Moench (USA)	44:59	1:48	3:17:45	1:58	2:12:32	6:18:59
12	Gurutze Frades Larralde (ESP)	48:04	2:06	3:23:43	1:33	2:06:26	6:21:49
13	Fawn Whiting (CAN)	51:05	2:06	3:27:51	1:49	2:06:18	6:29:08
14	Chino Iwabuchi (JPN)	44:56	2:10	3:35:44	1:49	2:08:13	6:32:50
15	Ruth Brito Curbelo (ESP)	45:22	2:02	3:26:21	1:40	2:18:05	6:33:29
16	Kendra Goffredo (USA)	55:50	2:33	3:31:03	1:38	2:18:49	6:49:52
17	Nagiho Ishida (JPN)	44:55	1:49	3:55:01	2:24	2:44:52	7:28:58
-	Melanie McQuaid (CAN)	45:29	1:55	3:21:57	1:35	-	DNF
-	Karen Thibodeau (CAN)	41:34	2:12	-	-	-	DNF
Key : DNF - did not finish ; DNS - did not start

== Para triathlon and age group ==
In addition to the elite races, a series of para triathlon and age group championship races were held over the event. The champions in each classification are listed below:

Classification	Athlete	Nation	Overall time
PTS3 Women	Maria Huche	Denmark	11:50:58
PTVI Men	John Domandl B2	Australia	07:34:09
18-19 Male AG	Payne Pachuda	United States	06:59:26
20-24 Female AG	Kiah Wheeler	Canada	06:56:28
20-24 Male AG	Loren Nelson	Canada	06:34:31
25-29 Female AG	Jenna-Caer Seefried	Canada	07:10:35
25-29 Male AG	Frank Sorbara	Canada	05:58:34
30-34 Female AG	Heather Low	Canada	06:54:03
30-34 Male AG	Maley Joel	Canada	06:07:52
35-39 Female AG	Jaime Simmons	United States	06:38:34
35-39 Male AG	Donovan Geldenhuys	South Africa	06:03:06
40-44 Female AG	Liza Rachetto	United States	06:32:21
40-44 Male AG	Martin Caron	Canada	06:01:53
45-49 Female AG	Tanya Salomon	Canada	06:52:26
45-49 Male AG	Dave Slavinski	United States	06:13:36
50-54 Female AG	Carolyn Craik	Great Britain	07:11:51
50-54 Male AG	Dan Stephens	United States	06:09:45
55-59 Female AG	Ellen Hart	United States	07:07:06
55-59 Male AG	David Percy	Canada	06:39:37
60-64 Female AG	Jill Kirker	Canada	08:12:32
60-64 Male AG	Ron Gierut	United States	06:48:45
65-69 Female AG	Anne Viviani	United States	09:58:32
65-69 Male AG	Mike Wien	United States	07:21:44
70-74 Female AG	Lydia Miller	Canada	10:04:40
70-74 Male AG	Mike Nelson	United States	08:32:21
