= 2015 ITU Long Distance Triathlon World Championships =

International sports competition

World Long Distance Triathlon Championships
- Location: Motala, Sweden
- Date: June 27 2015

Champions
- Men: Cyril Viennot^{(fr)} (FRA)
- Women: Mary Beth Ellis (USA)

The 2015 ITU Long Distance Triathlon World Championships was a triathlon competition held in Motala in Sweden on June 27 2015 and organized by the International Triathlon Union, now World Triathlon. The Elite races for men and consisted of a 1.5 km (0.93 mi) swim, 120 km (75 mi) bike and 30 km (19 mi) run, longer than the standard 1.5 km swim, 40 km bike and 10 km run associated with the World Triathlon Championship Series and the Olympic Games, but shorter than the classic Ironman Triathlon event.

The swim leg, originally scheduled for 3 km (1.9 mi) was reduced for health reasons due to water temperature.

== Medal Summary ==
Event	Gold		Silver		Bronze	
Men	Cyril Viennot^{(fr)} France	4:54:33	Martin Jensen; Denmark	4:54:45	Joe Skipper; Great Britain	4:55:10
Women	Mary Beth Ellis; United States	5:24:25	Camilla Pedersen^{(dk)} Denmark	5:31:48	Kaisa Lehtonen^{(fi)} Finland	5:33:41

== Results ==
The following are the results of the elite races:

=== Men ===
Rank	Athlete	Swim	T1	Bike	T2	Run	Time
1st place, gold medalist(s)	Cyril Viennot (FRA)	19:39	1:29	2:40:42	1:32	1:51:11	4:54:33
2nd place, silver medalist(s)	Martin Jensen (DEN)	17:58	1:21	2:38:54	1:23	1:55:09	4:54:45
3rd place, bronze medalist(s)	Joe Skipper (GBR)	20:54	1:45	2:43:22	1:23	1:47:46	4:55:10
4	Ruedi Wild (SUI)	18:08	1:21	2:44:41	1:40	1:49:51	4:55:42
5	Patrik Nilsson (SWE)	18:01	1:17	2:46:40	1:27	1:49:17	4:56:40
6	Ronnie Schildknecht (SUI)	19:42	1:16	2:44:50	1:28	1:51:07	4:58:23
7	Joe Gambles (AUS)	18:11	1:28	2:44:10	1:36	1:53:26	4:58:50
8	Filip Ospaly (CZE)	17:55	1:18	2:52:59	1:31	1:48:03	5:01:45
9	Samuel Betten (AUS)	17:59	1:32	2:53:12	1:28	1:49:21	5:03:33
10	Andrej Vistica (CRO)	19:57	1:29	2:44:26	1:28	1:56:41	5:04:01
11	Gustavo Rodriguez Iglesias (ESP)	22:18	1:31	2:48:01	1:39	1:53:45	5:07:15
12	Karl-Johan Danielsson (SWE)	18:43	1:34	2:45:31	1:19	2:03:46	5:10:53
13	Pontus Lindberg (SWE)	19:06	1:50	2:54:54	1:29	1:56:41	5:14:01
14	Alberto Casadei (ITA)	18:42	1:22	2:55:58	1:36	1:56:54	5:14:32
15	Diederik Scheltinga (NED)	20:51	2:10	2:55:48	1:39	1:56:39	5:17:07
16	George Bjälkemo (SWE)	22:54	1:34	2:53:03	1:29	1:58:53	5:17:53
17	Henrik Hyldelund (DEN)	18:41	1:29	2:48:52	1:50	2:07:19	5:18:11
18	Joshua Amberger (AUS)	17:46	1:27	2:45:01	1:45	2:14:56	5:20:55
19	José Estrangeiro (POR)	19:38	1:18	2:58:01	1:18	2:02:22	5:22:36
20	Rasmus Henning (DEN)	18:43	1:22	3:02:58	1:32	1:59:06	5:23:42
21	Nikolay Yaroshenko (RUS)	17:47	1:27	2:59:30	1:45	2:05:35	5:26:04
22	Attila Szabó (HUN)	18:41	2:08	3:02:26	2:30	2:00:41	5:26:26
23	Eddy Lamers (NED)	19:54	1:33	2:57:33	1:52	2:07:40	5:28:31
24	Alexey Brylev (RUS)	20:25	1:21	3:02:51	1:37	2:02:21	5:28:34
25	Kaito Tohara (JPN)	19:55	1:29	3:06:08	1:58	1:59:38	5:29:09
26	Andrey Lyatskiy (RUS)	19:42	1:25	3:02:57	2:04	2:04:26	5:30:34
27	Jarmo Hast (FIN)	19:55	1:33	3:04:37	1:27	2:03:27	5:30:59
28	Fredrik Carlén (SWE)	19:45	1:34	2:58:45	1:43	2:10:17	5:32:06
29	Kuniaki Takahama (JPN)	18:40	1:47	3:16:03	2:30	1:53:56	5:32:56
30	Georgy Kaurov (RUS)	18:03	1:23	3:08:23	1:47	2:07:32	5:37:09
31	Joel Jokinen (FIN)	22:43	1:26	3:05:29	1:49	2:12:21	5:43:50
32	Andreas Niedrig (GER)	17:51	1:20	2:46:49	1:50	2:37:25	5:45:16
33	Ken Koike (JPN)	19:49	1:20	3:21:07	1:33	2:12:13	5:56:03
34	Daniel Mugica Corrales (ESP)	19:55	1:29	3:05:14	1:43	2:30:32	5:58:52
35	Hector Fonseca (CRC)	25:05	1:50	3:10:17	1:54	2:26:16	6:05:21
36	Evgeniy Nikitin (RUS)	19:35	1:29	3:12:11	1:51	2:43:36	6:18:42
37	Aleksandr Kochetkov (LTU)	27:54	1:46	3:26:05	2:14	2:48:28	6:46:26
38	Juan Manuel Asconape (ARG)	28:19	1:49	3:42:03	4:21	2:37:08	6:53:40
-	David Näsvik (SWE)	20:53	1:16	2:53:39	1:30	-	DNF
Key : DNF - did not finish ; DNS - did not start

=== Women ===
Rank	Athlete	Swim	T1	Bike	T2	Run	Time
1st place, gold medalist(s)	Mary Beth Ellis (USA)	18:47	1:27	2:58:41	1:42	2:03:48	5:24:25
2nd place, silver medalist(s)	Camilla Pedersen (DEN)	19:21	1:27	3:02:18	1:30	2:07:11	5:31:48
3rd place, bronze medalist(s)	Kaisa Lehtonen (FIN)	20:55	1:25	3:07:28	1:43	2:02:10	5:33:41
4	Gurutze Frades Larralde (ESP)	24:29	1:56	3:12:47	1:37	2:07:36	5:48:25
5	Eva Nystrom (SWE)	23:46	1:53	3:10:49	1:32	2:12:04	5:50:04
6	Camilla Lindholm (SWE)	26:26	1:54	3:13:04	1:46	2:09:26	5:52:35
7	Hanna Maksimava (BLR)	20:53	1:23	3:19:20	1:57	2:10:50	5:54:22
8	Ewa Bugdol (POL)	20:52	1:28	3:17:03	1:38	2:15:12	5:56:14
9	Annie Thorén (SWE)	19:18	1:39	3:15:26	1:21	2:26:19	6:04:03
10	Lena Holmgren (SWE)	26:05	2:28	3:22:49	1:56	2:10:52	6:04:11
11	Amy Forshaw (GBR)	23:57	1:46	3:24:09	2:06	2:14:46	6:06:45
12	Mauren Solano (CRC)	24:00	1:48	3:24:42	1:43	2:24:13	6:16:26
13	Chino Iwabuchi (JPN)	22:41	1:41	3:33:05	1:33	2:19:19	6:18:19
14	Maki Nishiuchi (JPN)	20:56	1:47	3:24:54	2:02	3:04:10	6:53:49
-	Ariane Monticeli (BRA)	25:26	2:05	3:13:46	1:46	-	DNF
-	Venla Koivula-Huttunen (FIN)	22:52	1:35	3:27:37	1:59	-	DNF
-	Emma Graaf (SWE)	22:54	1:31	3:33:57	1:54	-	DNF
-	Vanessa Pereira (POR)	26:13	2:20	3:28:58	1:57	-	DSQ
Key : DNF - did not finish ; DSQ - disqualified

== Paratriathlon and age-group championships ==
In addition to the elite races a program of championship races in amateur age-group and selected para triathlon classes took place. The champions in each classification are listed below:

Classification	Athlete	Country	Overall time
18-19 Male	Tyler Allan	Australia	6:00:13
20-24 Female	Jessica Åhlund	Sweden	6:35:50
20-24 Male	Nathan Dortmann	France	5:38:04
25-29 Female	Sara Svensk	Sweden	6:02:55
25-29 Male	Adriel Young	Australia	5:24:52
30-34 Female	Cecilia Jessen	Sweden	6:20:18
30-34 Male	Mike Wood	Great Britain	5:31:31
35-39 Female	Estelle-Marie Kieffer	France	6:09:16
35-39 Male	Jan Henningsen	Denmark	5:30:13
40-44 Female	Kristina Beckendorf	Denmark	6:20:57
40-44 Male	Rainer Aumann	Germany	5:19:12
45-49 Female	Viktoria Johnsson	Sweden	6:25:06
45-49 Male	Carl Brümmer	Sweden	5:28:47
50-54 Female	Kaisa Ilvesmäki-Jakobsen	Denmark	6:42:53
50-54 Male	Claus Leinøe	Denmark	5:44:44
55-59 Female	Jane Wiley	Great Britain	6:45:30
55-59 Male	Roland Eble	Switzerland	6:00:48
60-64 Female	Sheri Schrock	United States	7:54:15
60-64 Male	Jim Stewart	Canada	6:39:55
65-69 Female	Shirley Jean Rolston	New Zealand	8:49:22
65-69 Male	Hermann Hefti	Switzerland	6:54:34
70-74 Male	Olaf Ellefsen	Norway	7:21:31
75-79 Male	John Weber	United States	9:56:31
Men's PT1	Jörg Walden	Germany	8:09:00
Men's PT2	Christian Troger	Austria	7:56:39
Women's PT4	Maria Huche	Denmark	9:42:41
