= 2019 Ironman World Championship =

2014 triathlon competition

Ironman World Championship
- Location: Kailua-Kona, Hawaii
- Date: October 12, 2019

Champions
- Men: (Germany) Jan Frodeno
- Women: (Germany) Anne Haug

The 2019 Ironman World Championship was a long distance triathlon competition held on October 12, 2019 in Kailua-Kona, Hawaii that was won by Jan Frodeno of Germany and Anne Haug of Germany. It was the 43rd edition of the Ironman World Championship, which has been held annually in Hawaii since 1978. (Note: with an additional race in 1982) The championship was organized by the World Triathlon Corporation (WTC) and awarded a total purse prize of $650,000. For Haug it was her first Ironman World Championship win. For Frodeno it was his third Ironman World Championship win. Frodeno set a new overall course record previously set in 2018.

== Championship results ==
=== Men ===
Rank	Time (h:mm:ss)	Name	Country	Split times (h:mm:ss / m:ss)				
Rank	Time (h:mm:ss)	Name	Country	Swim	T1	Bike	T2	Run
1st place, gold medalist(s)	7:51:13	Jan Frodeno	Germany	47:31	1:58	4:16:02	2:59	2:42:43
2nd place, silver medalist(s)	7:59:40	Tim O'Donnell	United States	47:38	2:01	4:18:11	2:06	2:49:45
3rd place, bronze medalist(s)	8:02:04	Sebastian Kienle	Germany	52:17	2:12	4:15:04	2:35	2:49:56
4	8:02:52	Ben Hoffman	United States	51:01	2:25	4:24:01	2:17	2:43:08
5	8:06:41	Cameron Wurf	Australia	52:25	2:07	4:14:44	2:22	2:55:03
6	8:07:46	Joe Skipper	United Kingdom	52:28	2:29	4:16:18	3:01	2:53:30
7	8:08:48	Braden Currie	New Zealand	47:41	1:56	4:30:30	2:16	2:46:25
8	8:10:29	Philipp Koutny	Switzerland	52:20	2:06	4:15:14	2:59	2:57:50
9	8:12:27	Bart Aernouts	Belgium	57:03	2:05	4:19:47	2:24	2:51:08
10	8:13:37	Chris Leiferman	United States	52:29	2:15	4:24:20	2:14	2:52:19
Source: IMWC results 2019

=== Women ===
Rank	Time (h:mm:ss)	Name	Country	Split times (h:mm:ss / m:ss)				
Rank	Time (h:mm:ss)	Name	Country	Swim	T1	Bike	T2	Run
1st place, gold medalist(s)	8:40:10	Anne Haug	Germany	0:54:09	2:02	4:50:17	2:35	2:51:07
2nd place, silver medalist(s)	8:46:44	Lucy Charles	United Kingdom	0:49:02	2:05	4:47:20	2:18	3:05:59
3rd place, bronze medalist(s)	8:48:13	Sarah Crowley	Australia	0:54:05	2:11	4:50:13	2:24	2:59:20
4	8:51:42	Laura Philipp	Germany	0:59:03	2:27	4:45:04	2:57	3:02:11
5	8:54:44	Heather Jackson	United States	0:59:12	2:17	4:46:45	2:13	3:04:17
6	8:55:33	Kaisa Sali	Finland	0:59:14	2:11	4:53:53	2:57	2:57:18
7	8:58:38	Corinne Abraham	United Kingdom	1:02:46	2:31	4:51:15	2:38	2:59:28
8	8:58:40	Carrie Lester	Australia	0:54:15	2:22	4:50:01	2:25	3:09:37
9	9:08:30	Daniela Saemmler	Germany	0:59:06	2:06	4:45:08	2:38	3:19:32
10	9:09:06	Linsey Corbin	United States	0:59:09	2:55	5:00:25	2:47	3:03:50
Source: IMWC results 2019

== Sources ==
- "10/12/2019 Results: IRONMAN World Championship". World Triathlon Corporation. May 26, 2020.
- "Ironman World Championships: Lucy Charles-Barclay second as Anne Haug wins". BBC. July 20, 2020.
- "Triathlon: Germany's Frodeno wins Ironman World Championship, compatriot Haug takes women's race". The Guardian. July 20, 2020.
- "2019 Kona Ironman World Championships Results". NBC. July 20, 2020.
