= 2013 ITU Long Distance Triathlon World Championships =

International sports competition

World Long Distance Triathlon Championships
- Location: Belfort, France
- Date: July 2 2013

Champions
- Men: Bertrand Billard (France)
- Women: Melissa Hauschildt (Australia)

The 2013 ITU Long Distance Triathlon World Championships was a duathlon competition held in Belfort in France on July 2 2013 and organized by the International Triathlon Union, now World Triathlon. The Elite races for men and consisted of a 10 km (6.2 mi) run (replacing the swim), 86 km (53 mi) bike and 20 km (12 mi) second run; the event was longer than the standard 1.5 km swim, 40 km bike and 10 km run associated with the World Triathlon Championship Series and the Olympic Games, but shorter than the classic Ironman Triathlon event.

The championship was held as a duathlon ('run-bike-run') as the water temperature on the day of the race was unsuitable for competition.

== Medal Summary ==
Event	Gold		Silver		Bronze	
Men	Bertrand Billard; France	4:08:45	Terenzo Bozzone; New Zealand	4:10:43	Dirk Bockel; Luxembourg	4:11:51
Women	Melissa Hauschildt; Australia	4:42:38	Camilla Pedersen; Denmark	4:44:14	Rachel McBride; Canada	4:52:04

== Results ==
The following are the results of the elite races:

=== Men ===
Rank	Athlete	Nation	Run 1	T1	Bike	T2	Run 2	Overall time
1st place, gold medalist(s)	Bertrand Billard	France	32:59	1:13	2:17:45	2:53	1:13:53	4:08:45
2nd place, silver medalist(s)	Terenzo Bozzone	New Zealand	32:48	1:06	2:20:54	2:20	1:13:34	4:10:43
3rd place, bronze medalist(s)	Dirk Bockel	Luxembourg	33:31	1:11	2:20:04	3:09	1:13:54	4:11:51
4	Jens Toft	Denmark	33:31	1:40	2:20:14	3:27	1:16:26	4:15:20
5	Cyril Viennot	France	32:46	1:24	2:24:06	2:58	1:14:58	4:16:13
6	Viktor Zemtsev	Ukraine	32:47	1:37	2:26:23	3:10	1:14:22	4:18:20
7	Søren Bystrup	Denmark	32:52	1:23	2:25:52	3:14	1:15:35	4:18:57
8	Dmitry Rostyagaev	Russia	32:52	1:20	2:27:16	3:12	1:18:50	4:23:32
9	Nikolay Yaroshenko	Russia	32:43	1:15	2:29:28	3:19	1:20:05	4:26:53
10	José Estrangeiro	Portugal	32:47	2:01	2:35:17	3:16	1:15:23	4:28:46
11	Sylvain Sudrie	France	32:50	1:16	2:24:23	2:41	1:28:08	4:29:21
12	Andrej Vistica	Croatia	33:32	1:41	2:34:46	3:23	1:18:19	4:31:42
13	Pierre-Yves Gigou	Canada	34:48	3:05	2:35:01	4:12	1:17:51	4:35:00
14	Kuniaki Takahama	Japan	32:47	2:20	2:41:19	4:07	1:14:28	4:35:03
15	Marin Koceic	Croatia	34:57	1:36	2:39:18	2:35	1:17:31	4:35:59
16	Rudolf Cogan	Czech Republic	35:33	2:04	2:39:54	3:33	1:21:34	4:42:40
17	Daiki Masuda	Japan	34:15	1:29	2:42:28	3:38	1:24:46	4:46:38
18	Andrejs Dmitrijevs	Latvia	32:52	1:19	2:46:27	2:53	1:24:00	4:47:33
19	Jan-Roelf Heerssema	Netherlands	34:58	2:00	2:40:48	4:08	1:28:49	4:50:45
20	Hayato Kawahara	Japan	34:26	1:39	2:49:37	3:30	1:22:08	4:51:23
21	Edson Ferreira	Brazil	33:04	1:35	2:55:02	3:07	1:20:42	4:53:31
22	Mark Pellew	South Africa	36:30	2:03	2:48:43	4:24	1:22:07	4:53:50
23	Romain Guillaume	France	34:50	2:24	2:45:02	3:22	1:28:14	4:53:55
24	Bradley Venter	South Africa	35:01	2:35	2:41:23	4:50	1:30:24	4:54:14
25	David Sajner	Czech Republic	38:49	2:06	2:51:23	4:25	1:31:46	5:08:31
-	Stephane Poulat	France	32:55	1:38	2:48:30	3:00	-	DNF
-	Tomas Martinek	Czech Republic	35:31	1:18	-	-	-	DNF
-	Evgeniy Nikitin	Russia	44:21	1:56	-	-	-	DNF
-	Hannes Cool	Belgium	34:49	1:43	2:39:16	3:50	1:26:01	DNF
-	Dejan Patrcevic	Croatia	33:58	1:45	2:41:46	3:28	1:21:55	DNF
Key : DNF - did not finish ; DNS - did not start

=== Women ===
Rank	Athlete	Nation	Run 1	T1	Bike	T2	Run 2	Overall time
1st place, gold medalist(s)	Melissa Hauschildt	Australia	35:18	3:20	2:39:46	3:35	1:20:37	4:42:38
2nd place, silver medalist(s)	Camilla Pedersen	Denmark	36:57	1:15	2:38:17	2:29	1:25:14	4:44:14
3rd place, bronze medalist(s)	Rachel McBride	Canada	37:09	2:01	2:42:31	3:15	1:27:04	4:52:02
4	Jeanne Collonge	France	35:48	3:09	2:51:31	4:27	1:17:18	4:52:15
5	Jodie Swallow	Great Britain	38:07	1:36	2:46:40	3:31	1:25:59	4:55:54
6	Katja Konschak	Germany	37:14	1:54	2:55:06	5:14	1:23:03	5:02:33
7	Gurutze Frades Larralde	Spain	37:40	1:33	2:59:52	4:16	1:24:55	5:08:18
8	Susanne Svendsen	Denmark	36:57	1:57	2:56:47	3:48	1:30:04	5:09:34
9	Dana Wagner	Germany	41:04	2:42	2:56:07	3:45	1:30:10	5:13:50
10	Vanessa Pereira	Portugal	39:42	3:22	3:03:41	4:12	1:26:21	5:17:18
11	Maria Lemeseva	Russia	39:03	1:54	2:59:19	3:47	1:34:00	5:18:05
12	Kathrin Mannweiler	Germany	40:46	1:54	3:04:47	4:53	1:32:46	5:25:08
13	Natasha Gorie	South Africa	41:49	2:26	2:51:33	4:42	1:45:57	5:26:29
14	Bruna Mahn	Brazil	40:52	1:33	3:17:40	4:22	1:31:39	5:36:08
15	Annah Watkinson	South Africa	39:05	2:49	3:14:08	5:11	1:35:02	5:36:18
16	Marina Milković	Croatia	39:24	3:48	3:10:56	4:14	1:40:37	5:39:01
-	Keiko Tanaka	Japan	48:38	-	-	-	-	DNF
Key : DNF - did not finish ; DNS - did not start
