= 2021 World Triathlon Long Distance Championships =

International sports competition

Long Distance Triathlon at the World Triathlon Multisports Championships
- Location: Almere, Netherlands
- Date: 21 September 2021

Champions
- Men: Kristian Høgenhaug (DEN)
- Women: Sarissa De Vries (NED)

The 2021 World Triathlon Long Distance Championships was a triathlon competition held in Almere in The Netherlands on September 12, 2021, and organized by World Triathlon. The event returned after a one-year hiatus due to the covid pandemic, and was the first under the World Triathlon branding.

The Elite races for men and consisted of the full Ironman distance for only the second time, a 3.8 km (2.4 mi) swim, 180.2 km (112.0 mi) bike and 42 km (26 mi) run but under World Triathlon rdrafting rules, longer than the standard 1.5 km swim, 40 km bike and 10 km run associated with the World Triathlon Championship Series and the Olympic Games.

The championship was held as part of the 2021 World Triathlon Multi-sports Championships which crowns several world champions in non Olympic distance events governed by World Triathlon, but was heavily affected by the covid pandemic.

== Medal Summary ==
Event	Gold		Silver		Bronze	
Men	Kristian Høgenhaug; Denmark	7:37:46	Jesper Svensson; Sweden	7:39:25	Reinaldo Colucci; Brazil	7:45:15
Women	Sarissa De Vries; Netherlands	8:32:04	Manon Genet; France	8:34:22	Michelle Vesterby; Denmark	8:38:53

== Results ==
The following are the results of the elite races:

=== Men ===
Rank	Athlete	Swim	T1	Bike	T2	Run	Overall Time
1st place, gold medalist(s)	Kristian Høgenhaug (DEN)	49:44	1:22	4:03:15	1:49	2:41:38	7:37:46
2nd place, silver medalist(s)	Jesper Svensson (SWE)	47:08	1:31	4:05:40	1:48	2:43:20	7:39:25
3rd place, bronze medalist(s)	Reinaldo Colucci (BRA)	49:40	1:55	4:12:47	1:52	2:39:03	7:45:15
4	Evert Scheltinga (NED)	49:37	1:46	4:12:50	1:43	2:43:39	7:49:32
5	Thomas Steger (AUT)	49:47	2:00	4:19:48	2:15	2:41:08	7:54:56
6	Pablo Dapena Gonzalez (ESP)	47:13	1:31	4:22:53	2:16	2:42:03	7:55:54
7	Tomas Renc (CZE)	49:43	1:41	4:20:57	1:50	2:41:57	7:56:06
8	Victor Arroyo Bugallo (ESP)	56:51	1:53	4:20:16	2:31	2:38:48	8:00:17
9	Milan Brons (NED)	49:41	2:05	4:14:24	2:17	2:52:24	8:00:49
10	João Francisco Ferreira (POR)	49:46	1:26	4:21:10	2:08	2:49:08	8:03:36
11	Per Van Vlerken (GER)	51:19	1:25	4:18:00	2:01	2:51:10	8:03:54
12	Milosz Sowinski (POL)	51:30	2:27	4:21:47	2:08	2:51:34	8:09:24
13	Pete Dyson (GBR)	56:41	1:33	4:20:17	1:50	2:49:50	8:10:08
14	Erik-Simon Strijk (NED)	56:48	2:22	4:19:17	2:47	2:54:48	8:16:00
15	Adam Hansen (AUS)	57:01	2:11	4:02:46	1:50	3:20:04	8:23:50
16	Niek Heldoorn (NED)	49:38	1:52	4:20:52	2:06	3:10:49	8:25:15
17	Cornelis Scheltinga (NED)	56:46	1:56	4:28:46	2:33	2:55:48	8:25:48
18	Dirk Wijnalda (NED)	1:00:45	2:08	4:34:20	2:16	2:49:43	8:29:11
19	Jens Frommhold (GER)	56:52	1:29	4:20:07	2:04	3:09:50	8:30:22
20	Antony Costes (FRA)	47:11	1:19	4:13:28	2:05	3:29:02	8:33:03
21	Alexander Berggren (SWE)	47:21	1:36	4:31:39	2:03	3:10:38	8:33:16
22	Robert Fryer (GBR)	56:53	1:59	4:43:47	2:17	2:50:50	8:35:44
23	Michal Holub (SVK)	1:05:05	2:11	4:29:55	2:27	2:56:49	8:36:25
24	Diego Sebastian Vasquez Velasco (ECU)	56:58	2:33	4:27:55	2:59	3:08:42	8:39:04
25	Steff Overmars (NED)	56:52	1:49	4:28:42	3:27	3:29:38	9:00:25
26	Diederik Scheltinga (NED)	56:49	1:51	4:48:14	2:50	3:46:15	9:35:57
-	Kristian Hindkjær (DEN)	51:21	1:50	4:29:39	2:36	-	DNF
-	Lukas Kocar (CZE)	49:37	1:24	4:10:59	2:17	-	DNF
-	Kieran Lindars (GBR)	47:16	1:33	-	-	-	DNF
-	Sam Laidlow (FRA)	47:18	1:15	-	-	-	DNF
-	Andrew Starykowicz (USA)	49:48	2:00	-	-	-	DNF
-	David McNamee (GBR)	47:26	1:30	-	-	-	DNF
Key : DNF - did not finish ; DNS - did not start

=== Women ===
Rank	Athlete	Swim	T1	Bike	T2	Run	Overall Time
1st place, gold medalist(s)	Sarissa De Vries (NED)	53:31	1:55	4:32:41	2:11	3:01:49	8:32:04
2nd place, silver medalist(s)	Manon Genet (FRA)	56:28	1:44	4:36:09	2:01	2:58:01	8:34:22
3rd place, bronze medalist(s)	Michelle Vesterby (DEN)	56:26	1:40	4:30:56	2:15	3:07:38	8:38:53
4	Elisabetta Curridori (ITA)	56:06	2:00	4:48:44	1:50	2:52:32	8:41:08
5	Leanne Fanoy (UAE)	1:00:50	2:39	4:42:52	2:27	2:56:28	8:45:14
6	Sarah Crowley (AUS)	56:30	1:39	4:44:59	2:15	3:03:17	8:48:37
7	Annah Watkinson (RSA)	1:00:45	1:59	4:47:11	2:31	2:58:43	8:51:07
8	Saleta Castro (ESP)	56:37	1:38	5:01:41	2:36	3:10:13	9:12:44
9	Line Bonde (DEN)	1:02:17	1:58	4:45:21	2:22	3:21:36	9:13:33
10	Simona Krivankova (CZE)	1:07:41	2:07	4:56:11	2:05	3:08:59	9:17:01
11	Marta Bernardi (ITA)	56:45	1:57	4:50:48	2:29	3:26:16	9:18:13
12	Magda Nieuwoudt (RSA)	59:36	1:52	4:54:39	2:04	3:21:30	9:19:38
13	Vanessa Pereira (POR)	1:03:06	2:58	5:00:00	3:01	3:13:57	9:23:00
14	Janien Lubben (NED)	1:07:44	2:35	4:59:52	2:20	3:24:04	9:36:32
15	Helena Kotopulu (CZE)	1:11:20	3:21	5:06:42	2:37	3:15:42	9:39:40
16	Nicole Luse (USA)	1:07:43	2:43	5:20:10	3:05	3:47:40	10:21:18
-	Ilona Eversdijk (NED)	56:28	1:40	4:51:20	2:23	-	DNF
-	Alena Sinay (SVK)	1:02:59	1:43	4:52:18	1:54	-	DNF
-	Renee Kiley (AUS)	59:35	2:23	4:37:13	2:22	-	DNF
-	Camilla Pedersen (DEN)	53:33	1:35	5:10:00	-	-	DNF
Key : DNF - did not finish ; DNS - did not start
