= 2024 World Triathlon Long Distance Championships =

International sports competition

Long Distance Triathlon at the World Triathlon Multisports Championships
- Location: Townsville, Australia
- Date: 25 August 2024

The 2024 World Triathlon Long Distance Championships was a triathlon competition held in Townsville in Australia on August 25 2024 and organized by World Triathlon. The Elite races for men and consisted of a 3 km (1.9 mi) swim, 114 km (71 mi) bike and 30 km (19 mi) run, longer than the standard 1.5 km swim, 40 km bike and 10 km run associated with the World Triathlon Championship Series and the Olympic Games, but shorter than the classic Ironman Triathlon event.

The championship was held as part of the 2024 World Triathlon Multi-sports Championships which crowns several world champions in non Olympic distance events governed by World Triathlon.

== Medal Summary ==
Event	Gold		Silver		Bronze	
Men	Antonio Benito Lopez; Spain	5:02:54	Steven McKenna; Australia	5:06:03	Louis Naeyaert; Belgium	5:07:29
Women	Charlène Clavel; France	5:45:14	Marta Lagownik; Poland	5:47:16	Julie Iemmolo; France	5:51:04

== Results ==
The following are the results of the elite races:

=== Men ===
Rank	Athlete	Swim	T1	Bike	T2	Run	Time
1st place, gold medalist(s)	Antonio Benito Lopez (ESP)	37:51	2:41	2:38:17	1:02	1:43:06	5:02:54
2nd place, silver medalist(s)	Steven Mckenna (AUS)	37:50	2:25	2:38:42	1:07	1:46:01	5:06:03
3rd place, bronze medalist(s)	Louis Naeyaert (BEL)	40:18	2:34	2:37:21	1:02	1:46:16	5:07:29
4	Dylan Magnien (FRA)	37:48	2:34	2:38:30	0:57	1:51:42	5:11:28
5	Benjamin Hill (AUS)	42:40	2:56	2:34:42	0:56	1:53:32	5:14:43
6	Matt Burton (AUS)	42:44	2:40	2:34:53	1:28	1:57:39	5:19:21
7	Jye Spriggs (AUS)	42:45	2:41	2:48:33	3:12	2:00:42	5:37:50
8	Calvin Amos (AUS)	45:15	2:49	2:49:46	1:19	2:03:43	5:42:50
9	Samuel Betten (AUS)	42:22	3:13	2:51:59	0:53	2:07:14	5:45:39
10	Tsukasa Kuyama (JPN)	52:19	4:53	3:00:56	1:12	1:57:55	5:57:13
11	Johnathan Dolan (USA)	37:41	3:19	2:59:30	0:46	2:19:50	6:01:04
12	Jason Christie (NZL)	50:57	4:12	2:54:24	2:35	2:09:22	6:01:28
13	Santosh Rai (NEP)	1:10:06	5:09	3:28:54	3:15	2:23:06	7:10:28
—	Ondrej Kubo (SVK)	42:38	2:34	—			DNF
—	Aichlinn O'Reilly (IRL)	37:54	2:33	2:40:09	1:38	—	DNF
—	Arthur Horseau (FRA)	42:42	2:27	—			DNF
—	Nicholas Free (AUS)	38:29	2:28	—			DNF
—	Charlie Quin (AUS)	37:44	2:29	2:38:42	0:52	—	DNF
—	Santosh Karmacharya (NEP)	1:07:03	7:02	3:30:35	2:11	—	DNF
Key : DNF - did not finish ; DNS - did not start

=== Women ===
Rank	Athlete	Swim	T1	Bike	T2	Run	Time
1st place, gold medalist(s)	Charlène Clavel (FRA)	45:30	2:51	2:53:27	1:03	2:02:25	5:45:14
2nd place, silver medalist(s)	Marta Lagownik (POL)	45:03	2:43	3:00:56	1:05	1:57:31	5:47:16
3rd place, bronze medalist(s)	Julie Iemmolo (FRA)	41:37	3:03	2:52:42	0:53	2:12:50	5:51:04
4	Ai Ueda (JPN)	45:35	2:43	3:07:02	0:59	2:02:42	5:59:00
5	Katherine Gillespie-Jones (AUS)	47:44	4:05	2:58:44	0:59	2:11:58	6:03:29
6	Emily Donker (AUS)	45:36	3:00	3:08:20	1:45	2:09:44	6:08:22
7	Misaki Tanaka (JPN)	45:39	3:20	3:22:35	1:46	2:15:52	6:29:10
8	Sarah Thomas (AUS)	53:35	3:29	3:16:17	1:19	2:15:34	6:30:12
9	Julia Klein (GER)	56:29	3:10	3:14:37	1:40	2:21:59	6:37:54
—	Marion Legrand (FRA)	51:23	2:59	—			DNF
Key : DNF - did not finish ; DNS - did not start

== Paratriathlon and age-grade ==
Alongside the elite races, world age-grade and para long distance triathlon races were held. The winners in each grade were as follows:

Classification	Winner	Nation	Time
Para triathlon
PTWC Men	Trent Fielder (H1)	United States	11:50:42
PTS5 Men	Bruce Jordan	New Zealand	8:09:26
PTVI Men	Dean Cameron (B1)	Australia	8:37:37
Age grade male
18-19 Male	Bastian Meza	Chile	6:36:23
20-24 Male	Dylan Clough	Australia	5:50:44
25-29 Male	Rémi Jauzac	France	5:39:13
30-34 Male	Filip Szymonik	Poland	5:33:52
35-39 Male	Will Clarke	Australia	5:26:18
40-44 Male	Luke Jones	Australia	5:41:39
45-49 Male	Antonio Ferreira Da Silva Neto	United States	6:00:04
50-54 Male	Kirk Purchase	Australia	6:12:02
55-59 Male	Pete Eggleston	Great Britain	6:20:30
60-64 Male	Graham Bruce	Australia	6:26:35
65-69 Male	Peter Kane	New Zealand	6:58:44
70-74 Male	Richard Jeffrey	Australia	7:21:01
75-79 Male	Dean Elliott	Canada	10:54:48
Age grade female
20-24 Female	Jasmine Brown	Australia	6:01:12
25-29 Female	Lauren Hume	Australia	6:18:18
30-34 Female	Demi Caldwell	Australia	6:24:18
35-39 Female	Kirsty Wood	New Zealand	6:41:48
40-44 Female	Lesley West	Australia	6:18:05
45-49 Female	Tanya Fraser	Australia	6:44:26
50-54 Female	Isabel Anders	United States	7:16:21
55-59 Female	Chrissie Bowie	Australia	7:37:31
60-64 Female	Gill Fullen	Great Britain	7:09:15
65-69 Female	Kim Elvery	Australia	8:45:35
70-74 Female	Nancy Cole	Canada	11:49:56
