= 2014 ITU Long Distance Triathlon World Championships =

International sports competition

World Long Distance Triathlon Championships
- Location: Weihai, China
- Date: September 21 2014

Champions
- Men: (France) Bertrand Billard^{(fr)}
- Women: (Denmark) Camila Pedersen^{(dk)}

The 2014 ITU Long Distance Triathlon World Championships was a triathlon competition held in Weihai in China on September 21 2014 and organized by the International Triathlon Union, now World Triathlon. The Elite races for men and consisted of a 4 km (2.5 mi) swim, 120 km (75 mi) bike and 20 km (12 mi) run, longer than the standard 1.5 km swim, 40 km bike and 10 km run associated with the World Triathlon Championship Series and the Olympic Games, but shorter than the classic Ironman Triathlon event.

== Medal Summary ==
| Event | Gold | | Silver | | Bronze | |
|---|---|---|---|---|---|---|
| Men | Bertrand Billard^{(fr)} France | 5:09:09 | Sylvain Sudrie^{(fr)} France | 5:11:50 | Cyril Viennot^{(fr)} France | 5:15:34 |
| Women | Camila Pedersen^{(dk)} Denmark | 4:43:32 | Kaisa Lehtonen^{(fi)} Finland | 5:47:47 | Andrea Hansen; New Zealand | 5:54:29 |

== Results ==
The following are the results of the elite races:

=== Men ===
20 athletes took the start line, of whom seventeen completed the race. Bertrand Billard led home a France 1-2-3.

| Rank | Athlete | Nation | Swim | T1 | Bike | T2 | Run | Overall time |
|---|---|---|---|---|---|---|---|---|
| 1st place, gold medalist(s) | Bertrand Billard | France | 51:15 | 2:31 | 2:57:46 | 1:14 | 1:16:21 | 5:09:09 |
| 2nd place, silver medalist(s) | Sylvain Sudrie | France | 49:59 | 2:33 | 2:59:43 | 1:12 | 1:18:22 | 5:11:50 |
| 3rd place, bronze medalist(s) | Cyril Viennot | France | 55:10 | 2:40 | 2:59:48 | 1:00 | 1:16:54 | 5:15:34 |
| 4 | Graham O'grady | New Zealand | 50:05 | 2:35 | 3:07:23 | 1:12 | 1:16:35 | 5:17:53 |
| 5 | Craig Alexander | Australia | 55:09 | 2:47 | 3:11:59 | 1:07 | 1:09:41 | 5:20:45 |
| 6 | Gustavo Rodriguez Iglesias | Spain | 59:32 | 2:56 | 3:02:59 | 1:20 | 1:15:05 | 5:21:53 |
| 7 | Rasmus Petræus | Denmark | 49:55 | 2:46 | 3:13:25 | 1:18 | 1:14:44 | 5:22:09 |
| 8 | Samuel Betten | Australia | 50:29 | 2:34 | 3:12:05 | 1:00 | 1:17:17 | 5:23:26 |
| 9 | Antony Costes | France | 51:11 | 2:35 | 3:09:24 | 1:13 | 1:19:59 | 5:24:24 |
| 10 | Nikolay Yaroshenko | Russia | 50:04 | 2:30 | 3:13:23 | 1:06 | 1:18:36 | 5:25:41 |
| 11 | Luiz Francisco Ferreira | Brazil | 50:31 | 2:40 | 3:12:54 | 1:29 | 1:20:00 | 5:27:35 |
| 12 | Denis Vasiliev | Russia | 49:57 | 2:42 | 3:15:14 | 1:31 | 1:25:03 | 5:34:29 |
| 13 | Artem Parienko | Russia | 55:11 | 2:24 | 3:23:50 | 1:13 | 1:13:22 | 5:36:01 |
| 14 | Allan Steen Olesen | Denmark | 57:30 | 2:50 | 3:15:09 | 1:17 | 1:23:45 | 5:40:34 |
| 15 | Greg Bennett | Australia | 51:17 | 2:37 | 3:16:01 | 1:53 | 1:30:16 | 5:42:06 |
| 16 | Roberto Corujo Acebedo | Spain | 59:22 | 3:16 | 3:21:50 | 1:28 | 1:18:53 | 5:44:50 |
| 17 | Kuniaki Takahama | Japan | 55:08 | 2:43 | 3:31:21 | 1:18 | 1:17:47 | 5:48:18 |
| - | Jens Toft | Denmark | 50:01 | 2:37 | - | - | - | DNF |
| - | Felipe Manente | Brazil | 59:17 | 2:46 | - | - | - | DNF |
| - | Bruno Pais | Portugal | 55:05 | 2:26 | - | - | - | DNF |
Key : DNF - did not finish ; DNS - did not start

=== Women ===
12 athletes took the start of the women's race, will all athletes completing. Denmark's Camilla Pedersen led home the field.

| Rank | Athlete | Nation | Swim | T1 | Bike | T2 | Run | Overall time |
|---|---|---|---|---|---|---|---|---|
| 1st place, gold medalist(s) | Camilla Pedersen | Denmark | 57:35 | 2:35 | 3:21:27 | 1:18 | 1:20:35 | 5:43:31 |
| 2nd place, silver medalist(s) | Kaisa Lehtonen | Finland | 59:16 | 2:39 | 3:24:34 | 1:25 | 1:19:51 | 5:47:47 |
| 3rd place, bronze medalist(s) | Andrea Hansen | New Zealand | 55:02 | 2:55 | 3:29:16 | 2:15 | 1:24:59 | 5:54:29 |
| 4 | Ewa Bugdol | Poland | 57:34 | 2:45 | 3:30:10 | 1:30 | 1:26:48 | 5:58:49 |
| 5 | Eva Potuckova | Czech Republic | 57:33 | 2:48 | 3:30:43 | 1:19 | 1:28:19 | 6:00:44 |
| 6 | Laura Bennett | United States | 55:00 | 2:47 | 3:37:44 | 1:22 | 1:26:00 | 6:02:55 |
| 7 | Vanessa Gianinni | Brazil | 59:32 | 3:23 | 3:37:02 | 1:36 | 1:24:05 | 6:05:40 |
| 8 | Natsumi Higashi | Japan | 1:05:25 | 3:03 | 3:43:25 | 1:19 | 1:40:59 | 6:34:14 |
| 9 | Gurutze Frades Larralde | Spain | 1:11:11 | 3:39 | 3:55:56 | 1:29 | 1:22:08 | 6:34:25 |
| 10 | Yasuko Miyazaki | Japan | 1:08:55 | 3:20 | 3:58:10 | 1:24 | 1:29:14 | 6:41:04 |
| 11 | Lynette Van Der Merwe | South Africa | 59:33 | 3:25 | 3:58:05 | 1:58 | 1:41:45 | 6:44:47 |
| 12 | Margarita Ovsyannikova | Russia | 1:17:38 | 3:10 | 4:23:37 | 1:49 | 1:44:45 | 7:31:00 |
Key : DNF - did not finish ; DNS - did not start

=== Age-group championships ===
In addition to the elite races a series of championships events were held for age-group competitors. The champions in each category are listed below.

| Class | Athlete | Nation | Time |
|---|---|---|---|
| 18-19 Female AG | Emma Langley | United States | 7:11:43 |
| 20-24 Female AG | Daniela Kaminska | Poland | 6:58:11 |
| 20-24 Male AG | Ryan Waddington | Australia | 5:36:50 |
| 25-29 Female AG | Liana Costello | New Zealand | 7:05:13 |
| 25-29 Male AG | Craig Davis | Australia | 5:42:55 |
| 30-34 Female AG | Tamasin Reno | Canada | 6:31:09 |
| 30-34 Male AG | Shane Gibbs | Australia | 5:52:01 |
| 35-39 Female AG | Kate Strong | Australia | 6:57:52 |
| 35-39 Male AG | Stephane van der Bruggen | Belgium | 5:51:18 |
| 40-44 Female AG | Victoria Hill | Great Britain | 6:58:02 |
| 40-44 Male AG | Bevan Mckinnon | New Zealand | 5:43:40 |
| 45-49 Female AG | Colleen Gray-Hewett | Canada | 6:53:51 |
| 45-49 Male AG | Grzegorz Zgliczynski | Poland | 5:59:56 |
| 50-54 Female AG | Marion Hermitage | Australia | 6:52:20 |
| 50-54 Male AG | Kyle Welch | United States | 6:07:13 |
| 55-59 Female AG | Deborah Clark | New Zealand | 7:42:46 |
| 55-59 Male AG | Michael Ryle | Australia | 6:55:48 |
| 60-64 Female AG | Cheryl Ogden | Australia | 8:21:07 |
| 60-64 Male AG | David Patten | Great Britain | 6:54:47 |
| 65-69 Female AG | Shirley Jean Rolston | New Zealand | 8:52:18 |
| 65-69 Male AG | Anton Hergouth | Austria | 8:15:10 |
| 70-74 Male AG | Marty Frezza | United States | 8:57:18 |
| 75-79 Male AG | John Weber | United States | 10:55:45 |
