= Sarah Thomas =

Sarah Thomas may refer to:

- Sarah Thomas (centenarian) (1788–1897), Welsh centenarian
- Sarah Thomas (writer) (1934–2023), Indian writer
- Sarah Thomas (actress) (born 1952), British actress
- Sarah Thomas (teacher), head of Bryanston School
- Sarah Thomas (librarian), American librarian, Bodley's Librarian, University of Oxford
- Sarah Thomas (field hockey) (born 1981), Welsh field hockey player
- Sarah Thomas (American football official) (born 1973), the first woman hired as a full-time NFL official
- Sarah Thomas (badminton) (born 1992), Welsh badminton player
- Sarah Thomas (marathon swimmer) (born 1981 or 1982), American marathon swimmer
- Sarah Thomas (model) (born 1980), English model
- Sarah Thomas (born 1969), married name of British swimmer Sarah Hardcastle
- Sarah Megan Thomas, American actress, writer, director, and producer
- Sarah Thomas Curwood (1916–1990), née Thomas, American educator, college professor, activist, and tree farmer

== See also ==
- Sara Thomas (born 1941), American politician
