= Lucie Zelenková =

Czech triathlete

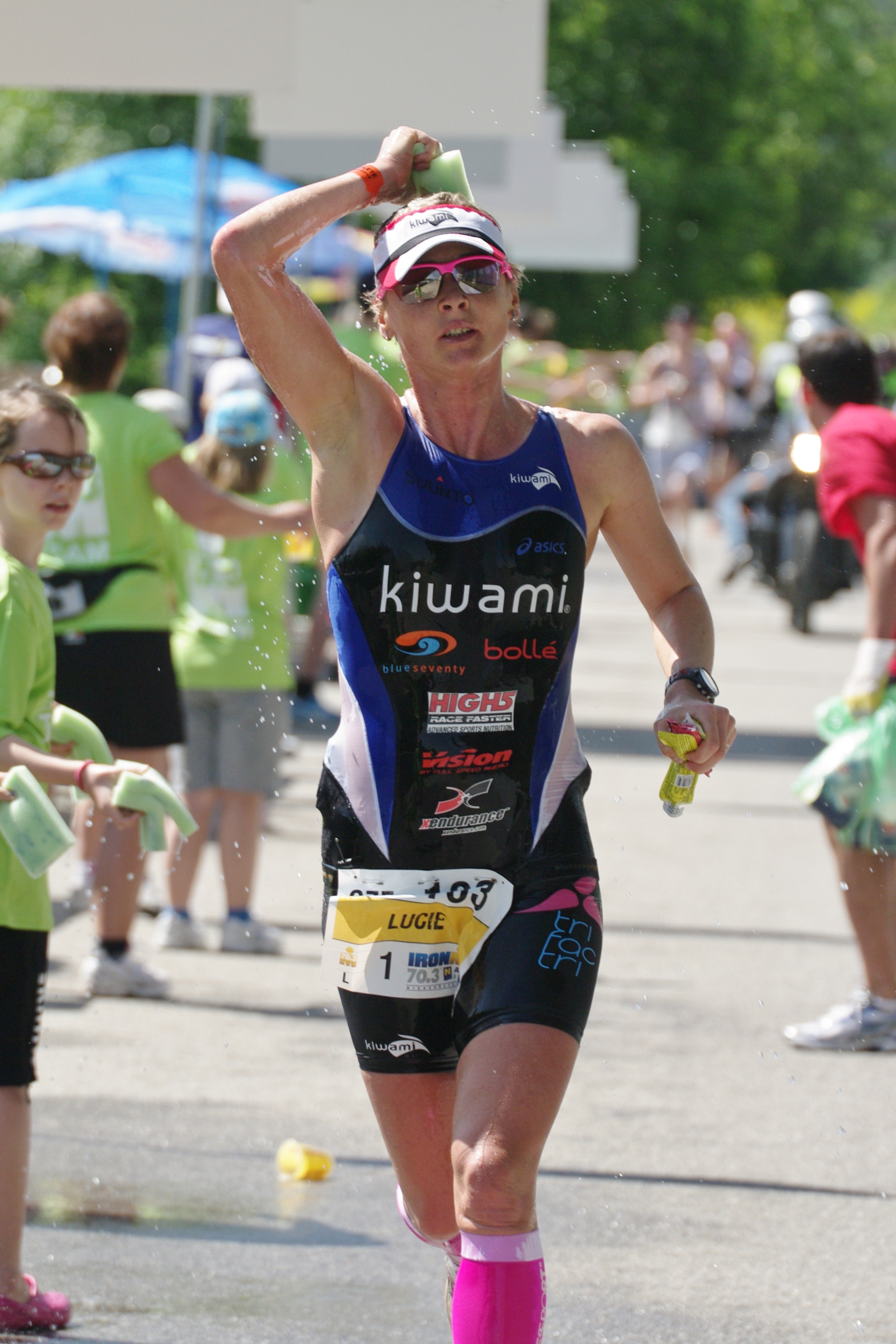
Lucie Zelenková-Reed competing in 2012 at Ironman 70.3 Austria

Lucie Zelenková (born 17 July 1974 in Chomutov) is a triathlete from the Czech Republic.

Zelenková competed at the second Olympic triathlon at the 2004 Summer Olympics. She did not finish the competition. She won Ironman 70.3 South Africa and Ironman South Africa in 2009.
