= Xavier Le Floch =

French triathlete

Medal record

Representing France

Men's triathlon

ITU Long Distance World Championships
Silver medal – second place	2007 Lorient	Elite men's race
Bronze medal – third place	2003 Ibiza	Elite men's race
Bronze medal – third place	2005 Fredericia	Elite men's race

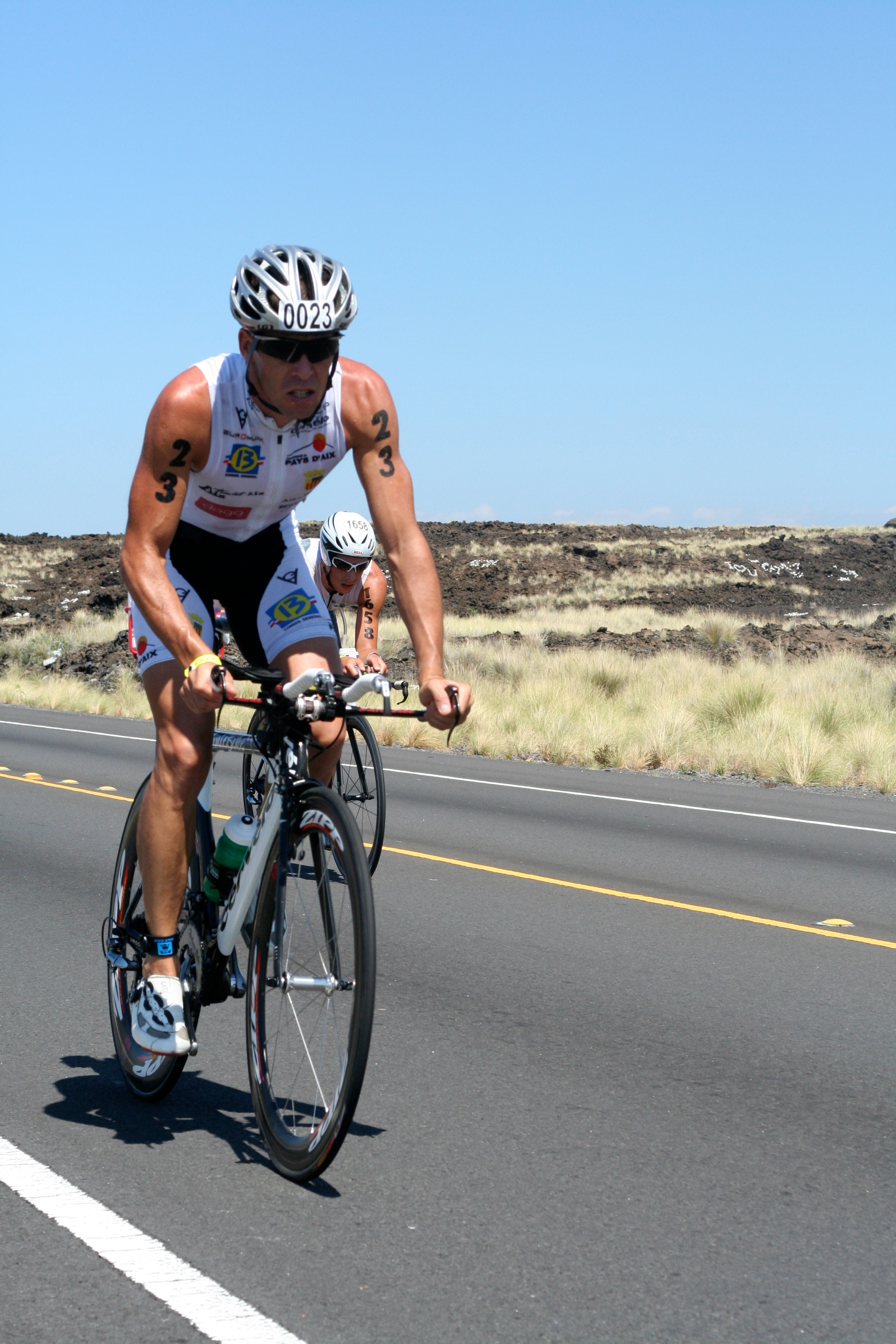

Xavier Le Floch is a French triathlete.

Le Floch won his first World Championships medal at the ITU Long Distance Triathlon World Championships in 2003, held in Ibiza where he finished in third position, claiming the bronze. Two years later in Fredericia he would equal his effort and won his second bronze medal at the same event. He won the silver medal at the 2007 Triathlon Long Distance World Championships in Lorient, beating his fellow country man Sebastien Berlier for the bronze medal, but finished behind Julien Loy, also from France.
