= Dirk Bockel =

Luxembourgish triathlete

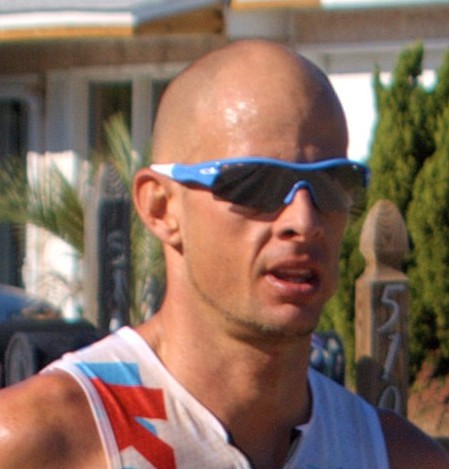
Dirk Bockel, Ironman Florida 2010

Dirk Bockel (born 18 October 1976) is a professional triathlete originally from Schwaikheim, Germany. He holds Luxembourgish nationality and raced for Luxembourg in the 2008 Olympic Games in Beijing.

He led the race for over 30 minutes after he broke away from the pack during the cycling leg of the race.

He competed in his first Ironman in New Zealand in March 2009 where he placed 3rd.

Bockel won Ironman 70.3 Florida in May 2009, marking the first Luxembourgish to ever win an Ironman event. He crossed the finish line wearing Mickey Mouse ears.

In 2009 Bockel placed 2nd at ITU European Championships and 7th at the Ironman World Championships in Kona, Hawaii. This is the best result for any Luxembourg athlete in the history of triathlon up to that point. In 2011 he went on to break his own Luxembourgish record by placing 4th at the Ironman World Championships in Kona, Hawaii.

In 2012 Bockel signed with Leopard Trek, marking the first successful integration of a triathlete into a pro cycling team's infrastructure. In the same year, he qualified again for the Ironman World Championships in Hawaii by winning the Ironman Regensburg with a time of 8:12

In 2013 Bockel won the largest triathlon event in the world, Challenge Roth, in a time of 7:52:01, and in 2014 he was crowned Asia-Pacific Champion at Ironman Melbourne.

In 2015, Bockel raced Challenge Denmark (Billund) and won by setting a new course record in preparation for the ITU World Championships. Days before the race he injured himself severely and had to sit out the entire year. Early 2016 Bockel had to undergo a Weil osteotomy and could not race due to his slow recovery from the surgery.

In January 2017 he retired from racing and left the sport section of the Luxembourgish military, after serving the country for over 11 years with an honorable discharge. Since 2017 he started with race commentating and additional public appearances throughout the world.

1 October he launched his FB Mentorship group and his book package (5 books) on bis blog www.liveandlettri.com/book 3 of them are available on Amazon/Kindle. Since the publication of his book THE ART OF TRIATHLON TRAINING he gained various media attention worldwide.
