= Joe Skipper =

English professional triathlete

Personal information
- Born: 25 March 1988 (age 38)
- Home town: Norwich
- Years active: 2011-2026
- Height: 1.81 m (5 ft 11 in)
- Weight: 78 kg (172 lb)

Sport
- Country: Great Britain
- Club: Tri-Anglia Triathlon Club; City of Norwich AC

Achievements and titles
- Personal best: (Ironman) 07:46:28
Medal record
Representing Great Britain
Men's triathlon
ITU Long Distance World Championships
Bronze medal – third place	2015 Sweden	Elite men's race

Joe Skipper (born 25 March 1988) is an English former professional triathlete and ITU Long Distance Triathlon World Championships bronze medalist.

Skipper won his first World Championships medal at the ITU Long Distance Triathlon World Championships in 2015, held in Motala, Sweden where he finished in third position, claiming the bronze.

As of 2015, Skipper holds the 3rd fastest Ironman bike split of all time. He is also the fastest British Ironman of all time. Skipper won silver at Ironman Texas in May 2015, breaking the course record for the cycle stage.

Skipper announced his retirement from triathlon in July 2026.

In August 2026, Skipper was issued with an 18 months ban backdated to May 2026 for an anti-doping rule violation relating to whereabouts failures.

== Achievements ==
Date	Competition	Place	Position
2011-05-29	British Sprint Triathlon Championships	Belvoir Castle, UK	2
2011-07-03	British Triathlon Middle Distance Championships	Bucks, UK	1
2013-05-19	ETU Challenge Middle Distance Championship	Barcelona, Spain	13
2013-08-03	Ironman UK	Bolton, UK	3
2013-11-02	Ironman Florida	Florida, USA	10
2014-04-13	ETU Long Distance Duathlon European Championship	Horst, Belgium	14
2014-07-20	Ironman UK	Bolton, UK	2
2014-10-05	Ironman Barcelona	Barcelona, Spain	6
2015-05-16	Ironman Texas	The Woodlands, Texas, USA	2
2015-07-27	ITU Long Distance World Championships	Motala, Sweden	3
2015-07-19	Ironman UK	Bolton, UK	3
2015-10-10	Ironman World Championship	Kona, Hawaii	13
2016-03-05	Ironman New Zealand	Taupō, New Zealand	2
2016-07-17	Challenge Roth	Roth, Bavaria	2
2018-07-15	Ironman UK	Bolton, UK	1
2018-10-12	Ironman World Championship	Kona, Hawaii	7
2019-11-02	Ironman Florida	Panama Beach, Florida	1
