= Sione Jongstra =

Dutch triathlete

Personal information
- Full name: Sione Jongstra
- Born: 5 February 1976 (age 50)

Sport
- Country: Netherlands
- Updated on 13 August 2010

Sione Jongstra (born 5 February 1976 in Ruinen, Drenthe) is a Dutch triathlete.

Jongstra, born in Ruinen and currently residing in Leerdam performed in artistic gymnastics, swimming, football and tennis, before making the step to focus completely on triathlon in 1996.

== Honours ==
2002
1st Dutch national championships (Nieuwkoop) - half triathlon
1st Dutch national championships (Soesterberg) - duathlon
8th World Championships (Nice) - long distance
1st Enschede - quarter triathlon
1st Groningen - Olympic distance
2nd Stein - quarter triathlon
1st Eupen - half marathon

2003
3rd World Championships age group 25-29 (Queenstown) - Olympic distance
9th World Championships (Queenstown) - aquathlon
2nd Assen- winter triathlon
1st Dutch national championships (Stein) - long distance
3rd European Championships (Fredericia) - long distance
3rd World Championships (Ibiza) - long distance
1st Nijeveen - Olympic distance
1st Groningen - triathlon
1st Lage - triathlon
1st Xanten - triathlon

2004
1st Assen - duathlon
3rd Knokke - triathlon
6th Shelbourne - half ironman
2nd Embrun - quarter triathlon
3rd World Championships (Säter) - long distance
1st Groningen - speedman
1st Obernai - triathlon
1st Dutch national championships (Nieuwkoop) - half triathlon
1st Paderborn - triathlon
2nd 's Gravenvoeren - cycle challenge
2nd European Championships (Venray) - powerman
1st Dutch national championships (Venray) - powerman
2nd Assault on the Carolinas (Spain) - 100 km cycling
8th New Zealand - ironman
5th Tauranga - half ironman

2005
3rd Obernai - triathlon
1st Dutch national championships (Nieuwkoop) - middle distance
1st Veendam - 10 kilometres
4th Saint Croix - half ironman
1st Knoxville, Tennessee - trideltalon
1st Loon - canoe triathlon
1st Groningen - run-skate-run
1st Inzell - winter triathlon
1st Venray - run-ATB-run

2006
1st Deventer - winter triathlon
9th Florida - ironman
1st Xanten - triathlon
1st Veenendaal - triathlon
1st Utrecht - sprint triathlon
1st Dutch national championships - long distance
1st Dutch national championships (Nieuwkoop) - middle distance
1st Obernai - triathlon
1st Ter Aar - quarter triathlon
1st Enschede - super sprint

2007
1st Muscat - sprint triathlon
