= Sébastien Berlier =

French triathlete

Medal record
Men's Triathlon
Representing France
ITU Long Distance World Championships
Bronze medal – third place	2007 Lorient	Elite

Sébastien Berlier is a French triathlete.

He won the bronze medal at the 2007 ITU Long Distance Triathlon World Championships in Lorient, becoming third behind World Champion Julien Loy and Xavier Le Floch who also participate for France.
