= Sarah Crowley =

Australian triathlete

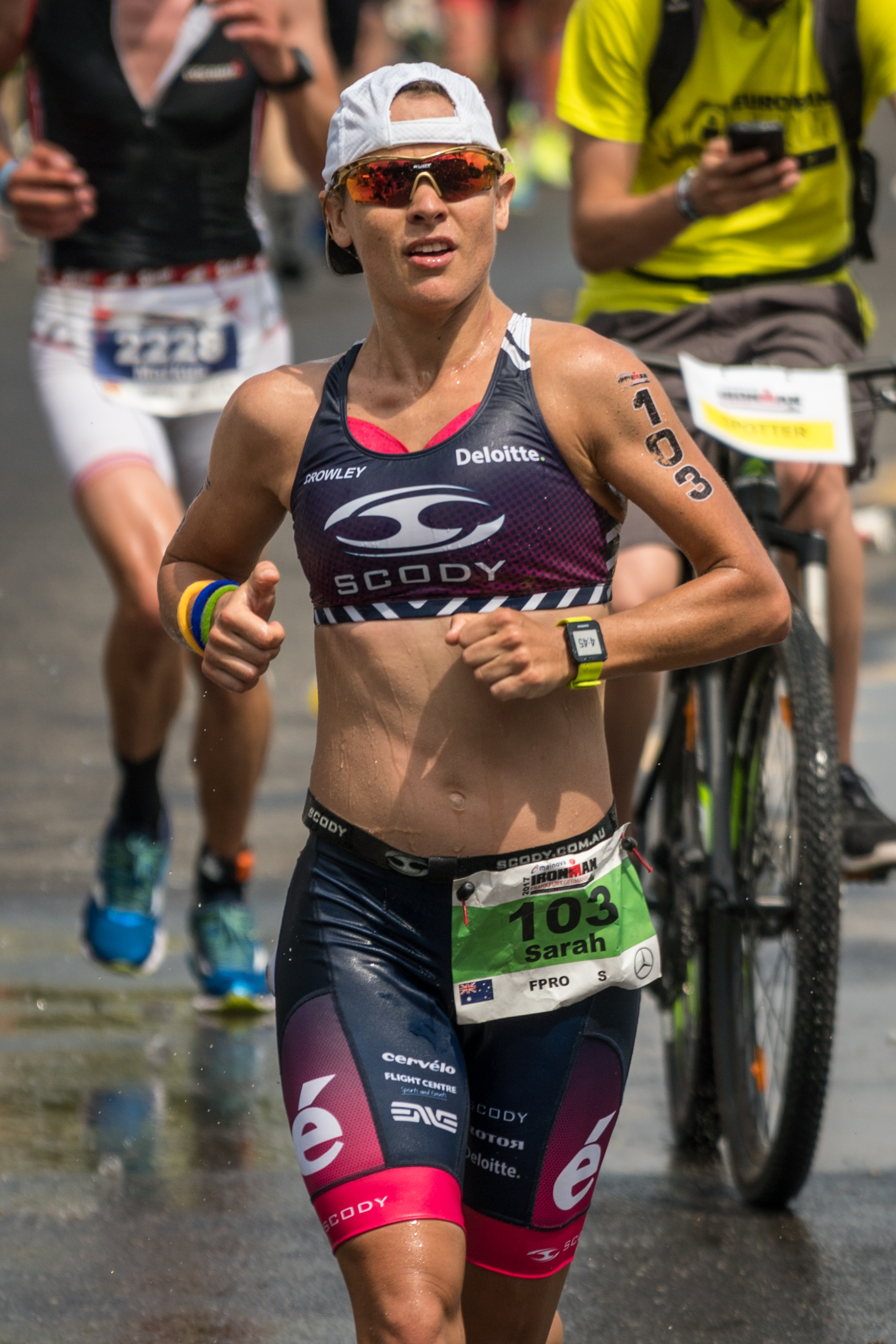
- Crowley at the 2017 Ironman European Championship in Frankfurt

Personal information
- Born: 4 February 1983 (age 43)

Sport
- Country: Australia
- Sport: Triathlete
Medal record
Women's triathlon
Representing Australia
ITU Long Distance Triathlon World Championships
Gold medal – first place	2017	Individual
Ironman World Championship
Bronze medal – third place	2017	Individual
Bronze medal – third place	2019	Individual

Sarah Crowley (born 4 February 1983) is an Australian professional triathlete. She is the winner of the 2017 ITU Long Distance Triathlon World Championships and placed third at the 2017 Ironman World Championship.

Prior to her third-place finish in 2017, Crowley had won two triathlons in 2017 at the Ironman distance and placed 15th at the 2016 Ironman World Championship.
