= Sara Gross =

British triathlete (born 1976)

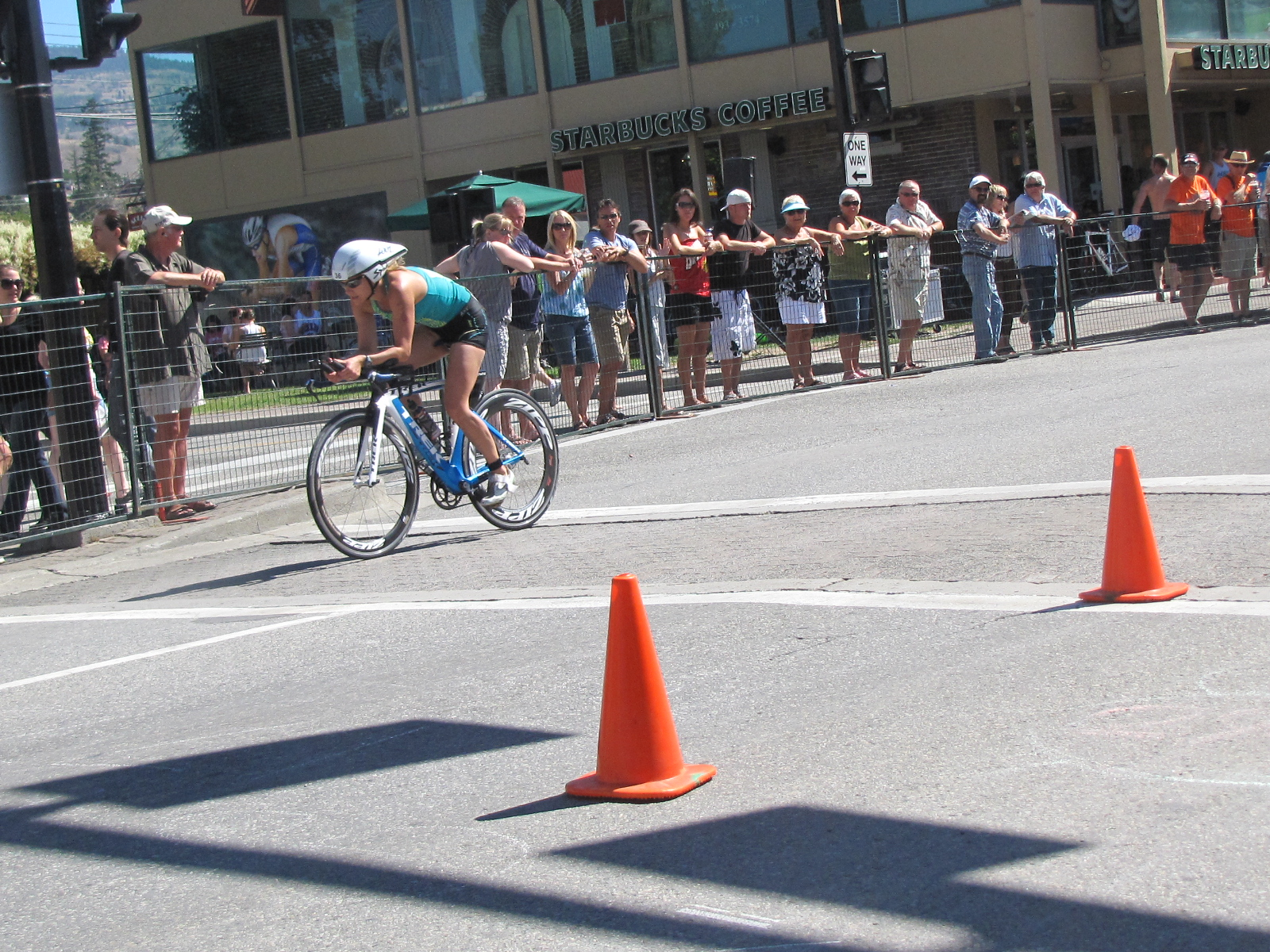

Sara Gross (born March 26, 1976, in Sarnia, Ontario) is a former professional triathlete, who was born in Canada but competed for Great Britain. She grew up in Kitchener, Ontario, and Al Ain, United Arab Emirates. In 2005, she won the ITU European Long Distance Triathlon (4 km swimming, 120 km road cycling, 30 km running) in Säter, Sweden. In 2014, she won two Ironman Triathlon events; Ironman Brazil and Ironman Mont-Tremblant. Gross retired from professional triathlon in 2016 and now focuses on her media career.

Gross attended Dollar Academy in Scotland for high school. She went on to attend Queen's University in Ontario, Canada where she obtained her bachelor's and master's degree. In June 2006, she graduated from University of Edinburgh earning a PhD in ancient history and religion with her dissertation focusing on women's history. It was during this time in Edinburgh that she took up the sport of triathlon.

In 2014, Gross, co-founded and is currently President of TriEqual, a NGO whose mission is to promote fairness, development and equality for women in the sport of triathlon

Gross also co-founded Mercury Rising Triathlon, with Carrie Herman. MRT is a performance-based club in Victoria, British Columbia, where she worked as a triathlon coach.

Gross was a member of the Bahrain Endurance Team, a professional triathlon team sponsored by His Highness Sheikh Nasser bin Hamad al Khalifa.

Gross was also a podcast host at WiSP Sports - The Global Women's Sports Network.
