= Julien Loy =

French triathlete

Personal information
- Born: 1 February 1976 (age 50)
Medal record
Men's Triathlon
Representing France
ITU Long Distance World Championships
Gold medal – first place	2007 Lorient	Elite
Gold medal – first place	2008 Almere	Elite

Julien Loy (born 1 February 1976) is a French triathlete.

He won the gold medal at the 2007 ITU Long Distance Triathlon World Championships in Lorient, becoming the world champion and beating his fellow countrymen Xavier Le Floch and Sebastien Berlier, who finished second and third, respectively. He also won the gold medal at the 2008 ITU Long Distance Triathlon World Championships in Almere, Netherlands.
