= 1994 ITU Long Distance Triathlon World Championships =

International sports competition

World Long Distance Triathlon Championships
- Location: Nice, France
- Date: June 26 1994

Champions
- Men: Rob Barel (Netherlands)
- Women: Isabelle Mouthon-Michellys (France)

The 1994 ITU Long Distance Triathlon World Championships was a triathlon competition held in Nice in France on June 26 1994 and organized by the International Triathlon Union, now World Triathlon. This was the inaugural edition of the event.

The Elite races for men and consisted of a 4 km (2.5 mi) run, 120 km (75 mi) bike and 32 km (20 mi) run, longer than the standard 1.5 km swim, 40 km bike and 10 km run associated with the World Triathlon Championship Series and later the Olympic Games, but shorter than the classic Ironman Triathlon event.

== Medal Summary ==
Event	Gold		Silver		Bronze	
Men	Rob Barel; Netherlands	5:59:47	Lothar Leder^{(de)} Germany	6:00:18	Yves Cordier; France^{(fr)}	6:03:09
Women	Isabelle Mouthon-Michellys; France	6:41:50	Karen Smyers; United States	6:57:21	Lydie Rueze; France^{(fr)}	7:01:17

== Results ==
The following are the results of the elite races:

=== Men ===
Top Ten only

Rank	Athlete	Nation	Time
1st place, gold medalist(s)	Rob Barel	Netherlands	5:59:47
2nd place, silver medalist(s)	Lothar Leder	Germany	6:00:18
3rd place, bronze medalist(s)	Yves Cordier	France	6:03:09
4	Holger Lorenz	Germany	6:04:14
5	Thomas Hellriegel	Germany	6:07:50
6	Venderbosch	Netherlands	6:08:59
7	Pierre Houseaux	France	6:13:28
8	Olivier Bernhard	Switzerland	6:14:55
9	Stefan Holzner	Germany	6:15:23
10	Dave Scott	United States	6:15;37
Key : DNF - did not finish ; DNS - did not start

=== Women ===
Top three only

Rank	Athlete	Time
1st place, gold medalist(s)	Isabelle Mouthon-Michellys (FRA)	6:41:50
2nd place, silver medalist(s)	Karen Smyers (USA)	6:57:21
3rd place, bronze medalist(s)	Lydie Rueze (FRA)	7:01:17
Key : DNF - did not finish ; DNS - did not start
