= Bella Bayliss =

British triathlete

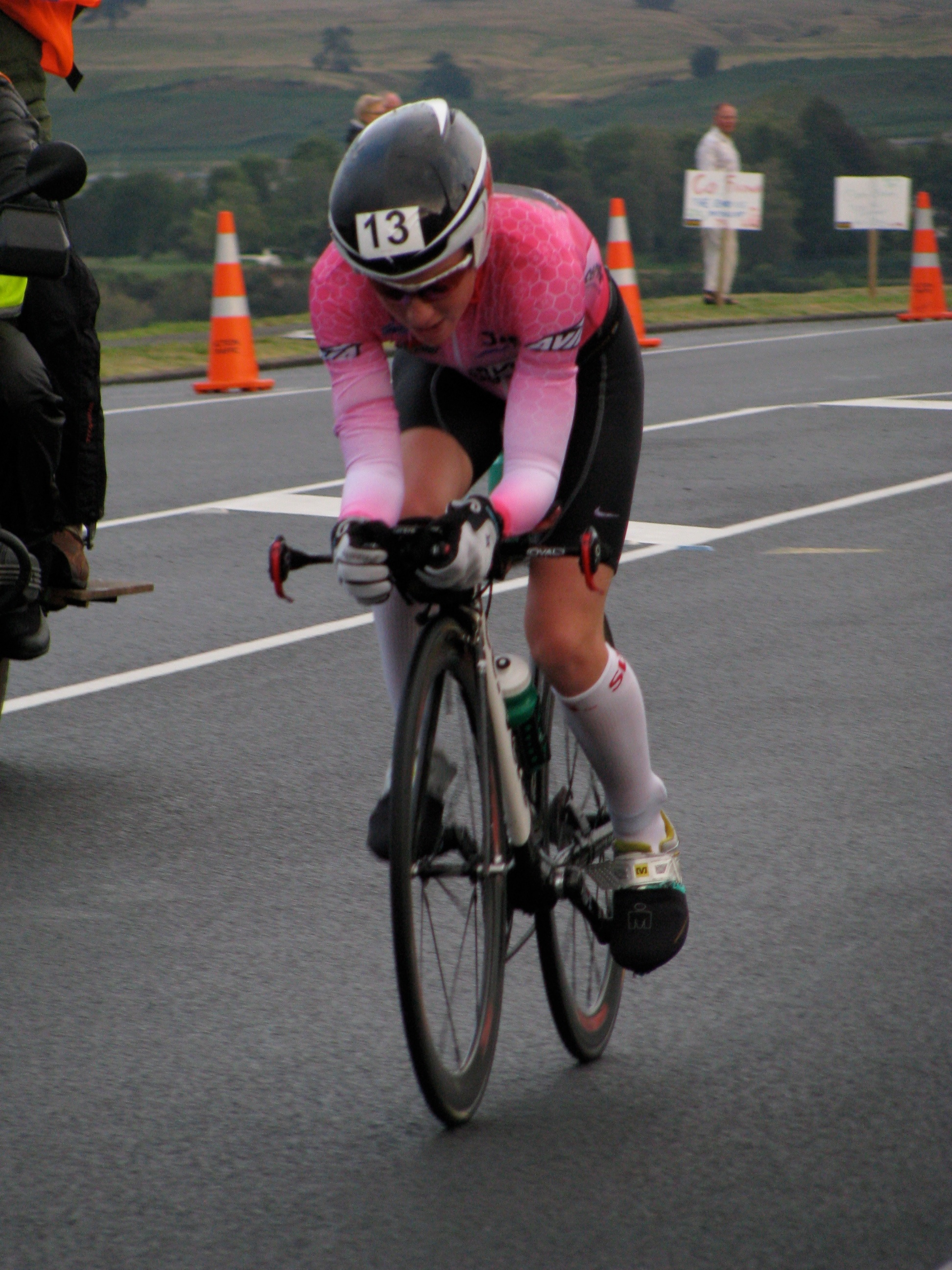
Bella Bayliss competing in Ironman New Zealand in 2009

Bella Bayliss (née Comerford, born 1 November 1977) is a professional triathlete from the United Kingdom. She competes in World Triathlon Corporation (WTC) Ironman and Ironman 70.3 triathlons. An Ironman triathlon consists of a 2.4 mi (3.8 km) swim, 112 mi (180.2 km) bike and a 26.2 mi (42.2 km) run. An Ironman 70.3 triathlon consists of a 1.2 mi (1.9 km) swim, 56 mi (90.1 km) bike and a 13.1 mi (21.1 km) run.

Bella's time of 8:51:17 at Ironman Austria 2008 was the 2nd fastest women's time in the world in the WTC Ironman 2008 series where 6,223 women finished. (286 Professional + 5,937 Amateurs)

== Results ==
Series	Race	Overall Position	Gender Position	Category Position	Category	Time	Qualified
WTC Ironman 70.3 2010	70.3 UK 2088	19	1	1	F PRO	4:53:52	
WTC Ironman 2009	Florida 2008	34	1	1	F PRO	9:07:48	
WTC Ironman 2008	World Championship 2008	116	7	7	F PRO	9:34:08	World Championship 2009
WTC Ironman 2008	UK 2008	18	1	1	F PRO	9:49:07	
WTC Ironman 2008	Austria 2008	24	2	2	F PRO	8:51:17	
WTC Ironman 2008	Lanzarote 2008	52	1	1	F PRO	10:02:28	
WTC Ironman 2008	South Africa 2008	24	1	1	F PRO	9:27:48	World Championship 2008
WTC Ironman 2008	New Zealand 2008	33	4	4	F PRO	9:25:33	
WTC Ironman 2008	Western Australia 2007	47	3	3	F PRO	9:14:25	
WTC Ironman 2008	Florida 2007	52	4	4	F PRO	9:13:34	
WTC Ironman 70.3 2008	70.3 UK 2008	13	1	1	F PRO	4:49:44	
