= 2010 Ironman World Championship =

2010 triathlon competition

The 2010 Ford Ironman World Championship was held on October 9, 2010 in Kailua-Kona, Hawaii. It was the 34th such Ironman Triathlon World Championships, which has been held annually in Hawaii since 1978. The 2010 Championship was won by Chris McCormack and Mirinda Carfrae. The championship is organised by the World Triathlon Corporation (WTC).

== Medallists ==
=== Men ===
Pos.	Time (h:mm:ss)	Name	Country	Split times (h:mm:ss)				
Pos.	Time (h:mm:ss)	Name	Country	Swim	T1	Bike	T2	Run
Gold medal	8:10:37	Chris McCormack	Australia	51:36	1:43	4:31:51	1:58	2:43:31
Silver medal	8:12:17	Andreas Raelert	Germany	51:27	1:54	4:32:27	2:05	2:44:25
Bronze medal	8:13:14	Marino Vanhoenacker	Belgium	51:33	1:59	4:31:00	1:58	2:46:46
4	8:16:53	Craig Alexander	Australia	51:32	1:49	4:39:35	2:00	2:41:59
5	8:20:11	Raynard Tissink	South Africa	52:25	1:56	4:30:48	2:20	2:52:44
6	8:21:00	Timo Bracht	Germany	53:52	1:59	4:29:42	2:10	2:53:18
7	8:22:02	Eneko Llanos	Spain	51:38	2:01	4:39:23	2:00	2:47:03
8	8:22:59	Dirk Bockel	Luxembourg	51:12	2:03	4:35:48	1:56	2:52:02
9	8:23:26	Pete Jacobs	Australia	51:15	2:02	4:47:05	2:01	2:41:06
10	8:24:04	Faris Al-Sultan	Germany	51:25	1:54	4:32:40	2:39	2:55:28

=== Women ===
Pos.	Time (h:mm:ss)	Name	Country	Split times (h:mm:ss)				
Pos.	Time (h:mm:ss)	Name	Country	Swim	T1	Bike	T2	Run
Gold medal	8:58:36	Mirinda Carfrae	Australia	55:53	1:56	5:04:59	2:18	2:53:32
Silver medal	9:06:00	Caroline Steffen	Switzerland	55:57	2:01	4:59:23	2:53	3:05:47
Bronze medal	9:10:04	Julie Dibens	Great Britain	53:50	1:56	4:55:28	2:39	3:16:12
4	9:16:47	Virginia Berasategui	Spain	57:46	2:22	5:05:36	2:34	3:08:31
5	9:18:48	Rachel Joyce	Great Britain	52:25	1:53	5:10:33	2:49	3:11:09
6	9:22:48	Karin Thuerig	Switzerland	1:13:12	3:10	4:48:22	3:39	3:14:27
7	9:23:33	Yvonne van Vlerken	Netherlands	1:01:58	2:00	4:59:42	2:16	3:17:39
8	9:26:42	Caitlin Snow	United States	57:50	2:27	5:27:40	2:41	2:56:04
9	9:27:02	Heleen bij de Vaate	Netherlands	1:13:07	2:16	5:02:30	2:22	3:06:49
10	9:27:42	Leanda Cave	Great Britain	55:43	1:49	5:07:30	2:36	3:20:06

== Qualification ==
To enter for the 2010 World Championship race, athletes are required to qualify through performance at an Ironman or selected Ironman 70.3 race, through Hawaii residency, through a random allocation lottery, or by invitation from the WTC.

The Ironman 2010 Series consists of 24 Ironman qualifying races plus the Ironman World Championship 2009 which was itself a qualifier for the 2010 Ironman World Championship. The series started with Ironman Wisconsin 2009 held on September 13, 2009.

=== Qualifying Ironmans ===
Date	Event	Location
Sep 13, 2009	Ironman Wisconsin	Madison, Wisconsin, United States
Oct 10, 2009	Ironman World Championship	Kailua-Kona, Hawaii, United States
Nov 6, 2009	Ironman Florida	Panama City Beach, Florida, United States
Nov 22, 2009	Ironman Arizona	Tempe, Arizona, United States
Nov 29, 2009	Ironman Cozumel	Cozumel, Quintana Roo, Mexico
Dec 5, 2009	Ironman Western Australia	Busselton, Western Australia, Australia
Feb 27, 2010	Ironman Malaysia	Langkawi, Malaysia
Mar 6, 2010	Ironman New Zealand	Taupō, New Zealand
Mar 14, 2010	Ironman China	Haikou, Hainan Island, China
Mar 28, 2010	Ironman Australia	Port Macquarie, New South Wales, Australia
Apr 25, 2010	Ironman South Africa	Port Elizabeth, South Africa
May 1, 2010	Ironman St.George	St. George, Utah, United States
May 22, 2010	Ironman Lanzarote	Puerto del Carmen, Lanzarote, Spain
May 30, 2010	Ironman Brazil	Florianópolis Island, Brazil
Jun 13, 2010	Ironman Japan	Goto, Nagasaki, Japan
Jun 27, 2010	Ironman Coeur d'Alene	Coeur d'Alene, Idaho, United States
Jun 27, 2010	Ironman France	Nice, France
Jul 4, 2010	Ironman Germany	Frankfurt, Hesse, Germany
Jul 4, 2010	Ironman Austria	Klagenfurt, Austria
Jul 25, 2010	Ironman Switzerland	Zürich, Switzerland
Jul 25, 2010	Ironman Lake Placid	Lake Placid, New York, United States
Aug 1, 2010	Ironman Regensburg	Regensburg, Bavaria, Germany
Aug 1, 2010	Ironman UK	Bolton, Greater Manchester, United Kingdom
Aug 29, 2010	Ironman Canada	Penticton, British Columbia, Canada
Aug 29, 2010	Ironman Louisville	Louisville, Kentucky, United States

=== 2010 Ironman Series results ===
==== Men ====
Event	Gold	Time	Silver	Time	Bronze	Time	Reference
Wisconsin	Raynard Tissink (RSA)	8:45:19	Christian Ritter (GER)	8:50:34	Raimo Raudsepp (EST)	8:51:30	
World Champs 09	Craig Alexander (AUS)	8:20:21	Chris Lieto (USA)	8:22:56	Andreas Raelert (GER)	8:24:32	
Florida	Kirill Kotshegarov (EST)	8:25:29	Maxime Kriat (UKR)	8:26:51	Massimo Cigana (ITA)	8:28:04	
Arizona	Jordan Rapp (USA)	8:13:35	T J Tollakson (USA)	8:20:22	Torsten Abel (GER)	8:20:39	
Cozumel	Rutger Beke (BEL)	8:18:40	Victor Zyemtsev (UKR)	8:29:10	Sebastian Pedraza (ITA)	8:33:28	
Western Australia	Patrick Vernay (NCL)	8:13:59	Scott Neyedli (GBR)	8:17:47	Jimmy Johnsen (DEN)	8:21:11	
Malaysia	Marino Vanhoenacker (BEL)	8:22:31	Hiroyuki Nishiuchi (JPN)	8:50:52	Romaine Guillaume (FRA)	8:54:38	
New Zealand	Cameron Brown (NZL)	8:21:52	Terenzo Bozzone (NZL)	8:30:00	Kieran Doe (NZL)	8:34:16	
China	Luke McKenzie (AUS)	8:41:15	Jozsef Major (HUN)	8:52:29	Jens Groenbek (DEN)	9:17:06	
Australia	Patrick Vernay (NCL)	8:23:54	Scott Neyedli (GBR)	8:27:58	Trent Chapman (AUS)	8:32:52	
South Africa	Raynard Tissink (RSA)	8:23:28	Mathias Hecht (SUI)	8:28:53	Daniel Fontana (ITA)	8:33:48	
St. George	Michael Weiss (AUT)	8:40:08	Ben Hoffman (USA)	8:52:54	Chris McDonald (AUS)	8:54:42	
Lanzarote	Eneko Llanos (ESP)	8:37:42	Bert Jammaer (BEL)	8:39:35	Maik Twelsiek (GER)	8:42:52	
Brazil	Luke McKenzie (AUS)	8:07:39	Ezequiel Morales (ARG)	8:12:44	Santiago Ascenço (BRA)	8:18:33	
Coeur d'Alene	Andy Potts (USA)	8:24:40	Courtney Ogden (AUS)	8:38:17	Michael Lovato (USA)	8:41:17	
France	Marcel Zamora Perez (ESP)	8:25:28	Frederik Van Lierde (BEL)	8:30:39	Olivier Marceau (SUI)	8:52:25	
Germany	Andreas Raelert (GER)	8:05:15	Timo Bracht (GER)	8:10:22	Chris McCormack (AUS)	8:14:43	
Austria	Marino Vanhoenacker (BEL)	7:52:05	Dennis Devriendt (BEL)	8:12:51	Michael Weiss (AUT)	8:14:50	
Switzerland	Ronnie Schildknecht (SUI)	8:12:40	Swen Sundberg (GER)	8:29:18	Mike Aigroz (SUI)	8:34:24	
Lake Placid	Ben Hoffman (USA)	8:39:34	Petr Vabrousek (CZE)	8:46:33	Maik Twelsiek (GER)	8:48:33	
Regensburg	Faris Al-Sultan (GER)	8:13:37	Andreas Böcherer (GER)	8:19:28	Nils Goerke (GER)	8:22:57	
UK	Fraser Cartmell (GBR)	8:40:17	Stephen Bayliss (GBR)	8:46:18	Axel Zeebroek (BEL)	8:49:37	
Canada	Victor Zyemtsev (UKR)	8:32:28	Christian Brader (GER)	8:32:41	Stephan Vuckovic (GER)	8:38:31	
Louisville	Paul Ambrose (GBR)	8:29:59	Martin Jensen (DEN)	8:41:54	Max Longree (GER)	8:50:10	

==== Women ====
Event	Gold	Time	Silver	Time	Bronze	Time	Reference
Wisconsin	Amy Marsh (USA)	9:43:59	Irene Kinnegim (NLD)	10:01:34	Hillary Biscay (USA)	10:02:58	
World Champs 09	Chrissie Wellington (GBR)	8:54:02	Mirinda Carfrae (USA)	9:13:59	Virginia Berasategui (ESP)	9:15:28	
Florida	Sofie Goos (BEL)	9:08:38	Tamara Kozulina (UKR)	9:12:47	Bella Bayliss (GBR)	9:13:52	
Arizona	Samantha McGlone (CAN)	9:09:19	Linsey Corbin (USA)	9:13:46	Kate Major (AUS)	9:20:12	
Cozumel	Yvonne van Vlerken (NED)	9:06:58	Bella Bayliss (GBR)	9:22:34	Edith Niederfriniger (ITA)	9:30:44	
Western Australia	Gina Crawford (NZL)	9:16:52	Christie Sym (AUS)	9:20:41	Sarah Pollett (AUS)	9:21:33	
Malaysia	Belinda Granger (AUS)	9:23:33	Edith Niederfriniger (ITA)	9:35:02	Hillary Biscay (USA)	10:10:59	
New Zealand	Joanna Lawn (NZL)	9:14:35	Gina Crawford (NZL)	9:28:26	Kim Loeffler (USA)	9:30:57	
China	Amy Marsh (USA)	9:52:45	Nicole Leder (GER)	10:02:58	Heidi Jesberger (GER)	10:08:52	
Australia	Carrie Lester (AUS)	9:23:50	Rebekah Keat (AUS)	9:33:10	Amelie Pearson (AUS)	9:46:09	
South Africa	Sonia Tajsich (GER)	9:16:55	Caroline Steffen (SUI)	9:22:00	Tine Deckers (BEL)	9:29:59	
St. George	Heather Wurtele (CAN)	9:35:26	Meredith Kessler (USA)	9:46:58	Caitlin Snow (USA)	10:07:26	
Lanzarote	Catriona Morrison (SCO)	10:03:52	Louise Collins (GBR)	10:05:20	Nicole Woysch (GER)	10:11:17	
Brazil	Tereza Macel (CZE)	9:19:13	Dede Griesbauer (USA)	9:26:09	Maria Omar (ARG)	9:36:04	
Coeur d'Alene	Linsey Corbin (USA)	9:17:54	Meredith Kessler (USA)	9:23:52	Kelly Williamson (USA)	9:39:23	
France	Tine Deckers (BEL)	9:21:29	Erika Csomor (HUN)	9:36:08	Alexandra Louison (FRA)	9:38:25	
Germany	Sandra Wallenhorst (GER)	9:04:27	Caroline Steffen (SUI)	9:06:42	Yvonne van Vlerken (NED)	9:10:21	
Austria	Eva Dollinger (AUT)	9:18:50	Karina Ottosen (DEN)	9:34:50	Beate Görtz (GER)	9:38:56	
Switzerland	Karin Thürig (SUI)	9:00:04	Heleen Bij De Vaate (NED)	9:23:50	Monika Lehmann (SUI)	9:28:25	
Lake Placid	Amy Marsh (USA)	9:27:30	Caitlin Snow (USA)	9:44:18	Lisa Marangon (AUS)	9:51:31	
Regensburg	Sonja Tajsich (GER)	9:09:46	Katja Rabe (GER)	9:32:04	Corinne Abraham (GBR)	9:41:21	
UK	Yvette Grice (GBR)	10:01:02	Bella Bayliss (GBR)	10:06:51	Joanna Carritt (GBR)	10:16:22	
Canada	Meredith Kessler (USA)	9:13:46	Heather Wurtele (CAN)	9:17:17	Mackenzie Madison (USA)	9:34:51	
Louisville	Rebekah Keat (AUS)	9:33:15	Kim Loeffler (USA)	9:44:23	Bree Wee (USA)	9:50:35	
