= 2009 Ironman World Championship =

The 2009 Ford Ironman World Championship was held on October 10, 2009, in Kailua-Kona, Hawaii. It was the 33rd such Ironman Triathlon World Championship, which has been held annually in Hawaii since 1978. The champions were Craig Alexander and Chrissie Wellington. The championship was organised by the World Triathlon Corporation (WTC).

== Race highlights ==
A total of 1,778 athletes from more than 48 countries started the race and 1,653 (1,200 men and 453 women) finished, 3 were disqualified. Hot and humid weather conditions prevailed with temperatures well above 90 °F (32.2 °C) during the bike and run portions.

Both Chrissie Wellington (3rd consecutive win) and Craig Alexander (2nd consecutive win) continue their current reigns as Ironman World Champions.

Chrissie Wellington set a new women's course record of 8:54:02, breaking Paula Newby-Fraser's 17-year-old women's course record. She finished 22nd overall among the pro men and women.

Mirinda Carfrae set a new women's course run record of 2:56:51 in her very first Ironman World Championship, breaking the women's course run record that Chrissie Wellington set one year ago.

== Medallists ==
=== Men ===
Pos.	Time (h:mm:ss)	Name	Country	Split times (h:mm:ss)				
Pos.	Time (h:mm:ss)	Name	Country	Swim	T1	Bike	T2	Run
Gold medal	8:20:21	Craig Alexander	Australia	50:57	1:44	4:37:33	2:04	2:48:05
Silver medal	8:22:56	Chris Lieto	United States	51:07	1:44	4:25:11	2:21	3:02:35
Bronze medal	8:24:32	Andreas Raelert	Germany	51:00	2:05	4:38:01	2:25	2:51:05
4	8:25:20	Chris McCormack	Australia	52:51	1:55	4:32:45	1:53	2:55:59
5	8:28:17	Rasmus Henning	Denmark	51:06	2:03	4:37:07	2:30	2:55:33
6	8:28:52	Timo Bracht	Germany	54:30	1:49	4:33:49	2:19	2:56:27
7	8:29:55	Dirk Bockel	Luxembourg	50:50	1:56	4:37:29	2:00	2:57:42
8	8:30:15	Pete Jacobs	Australia	50:03	1:43	4:38:41	2:35	2:57:14
9	8:30:30	Andy Potts	United States	47:45	1:56	4:46:07	2:29	2:52:15
10	8:31:44	Faris Al-Sultan	Germany	50:53	1:49	4:33:40	2:13	3:03:11

=== Women ===
Pos.	Time (h:mm:ss)	Name	Country	Split times (h:mm:ss)				
Pos.	Time (h:mm:ss)	Name	Country	Swim	T1	Bike	T2	Run
Gold medal	8:54:02	Chrissie Wellington	Great Britain	54:31	2:15	4:52:07	2:05	3:03:06
Silver medal	9:13:59	Mirinda Carfrae	Australia	58:45	1:54	5:14:18	2:14	2:56:51
Bronze medal	9:15:28	Virginia Berasategui	Spain	58:52	2:04	5:01:42	2:08	3:10:43
4	9:23:43	Tereza Macel	Czech Republic	53:29	2:13	5:04:17	2:35	3:21:12
5	9:30:28	Samantha McGlone	Canada	58:47	2:03	5:16:17	1:57	3:11:27
6	9:32:27	Rachel Joyce	Great Britain	53:31	2:21	5:10:03	2:51	3:23:43
7	9:34:45	Joanna Lawn	New Zealand	57:16	2:10	5:19:10	2:36	3:13:35
8	9:38:28	Sandra Wallenhorst	Germany	1:03:07	2:30	5:20:43	2:46	3:09:24
9	9:40:59	Dede Griesbauer	United States	55:05	2:13	5:10:22	2:29	3:30:53
10	9:42:41	Tyler Stewart	United States	1:08:31	2:20	5:06:20	2:31	3:22:59

== Qualification ==
To enter for the 2009 World Championship race, athletes were required to qualify through performance at an Ironman or selected Ironman 70.3 race, through Hawaii residency, through a random allocation lottery, or by invitation from the WTC.

The Ironman 2009 Series consisted of 21 Ironman qualifying races plus the Ironman World Championship 2008 which was itself a qualifier for the 2010 Ironman World Championship. The series started with Ironman Wisconsin 2008 held on September 7, 2008, and in total 1,800 athletes qualified for the World Championship race.

=== Qualifying Ironmans ===
Date	Event	Location
Sep 7, 2008	Ironman Wisconsin	Madison, Wisconsin, United States
Oct 11, 2008	Ironman World Championship	Kailua-Kona, Hawaii, United States
Nov 1, 2008	Ironman Florida	Panama City Beach, Florida, United States
Nov 23, 2008	Ironman Arizona	Tempe, Arizona, United States
Dec 7, 2008	Ironman Western Australia	Busselton, Western Australia, Australia
Feb 28, 2009	Ironman Malaysia	Langkawi, Malaysia
Mar 7, 2009	Ironman New Zealand	Taupō, New Zealand
Apr 5, 2009	Ironman Australia	Port Macquarie, New South Wales, Australia
Apr 5, 2009	Ironman South Africa	Port Elizabeth, South Africa
Apr 19, 2009	Ironman China	Haikou, Hainan Island, China
May 23, 2009	Ironman Lanzarote	Puerto del Carmen, Lanzarote, Spain
May 31, 2009	Ironman Brazil	Florianópolis Island, Brazil
Jun 21, 2009	Ironman Japan	Goto, Nagasaki, Japan
Jun 21, 2009	Ironman Coeur d'Alene	Coeur d'Alene, Idaho, United States
Jun 28, 2009	Ironman France	Nice, France
Jul 5, 2009	Ironman Germany	Frankfurt, Germany
Jul 5, 2009	Ironman Austria	Klagenfurt, Austria
Jul 12, 2009	Ironman Switzerland	Zürich, Switzerland
Jul 26, 2009	Ironman Lake Placid	Lake Placid, New York, United States
Aug 2, 2009	Ironman UK	Bolton, Greater Manchester, United Kingdom
Aug 30, 2009	Ironman Canada	Penticton, British Columbia, Canada
Aug 30, 2009	Ironman Louisville	Louisville, Kentucky, United States

The fastest time of 7:59:16 was set by Timo Bracht during the Ironman European Championship 2009 at Frankfurt, Germany.

=== 2009 Ironman Series results ===
==== Men ====
Event	Gold	Time	Silver	Time	Bronze	Time	Reference
Wisconsin	Raynard Tissink (RSA)	8:43:29	Serge Meyer (SUI)	8:55:00	Jason Shortis (AUS)	8:59:14	
World Champs 08	Craig Alexander (AUS)	8:17.45	Eneko Llanos Burguera (ESP)	8:20:50	Rutger Beke (BEL)	8:21:23	
Florida	Tom Evans (CAN)	8:07:59	Torbjørn Sindballe (DEN)	8:17:51	Petr Vabrousek (CZE)	8:23:00	
Arizona	Andreas Raelert (GER)	8:14:16	Chris Lieto (USA)	8:19:25	Jordan Rapp (USA)	8:19:45	
Western Australia	Tim Berkel (AUS)	8:07:06	Jason Shortis (AUS)	8:10:57	Luke Mckenzie (AUS)	8:12:45	
Malaysia	Luke McKenzie (AUS)	8:27:48	Bryan Rhodes (NZL)	8:32:52	Brian Fuller (AUS)	8:38:06	
New Zealand	Cameron Brown (NZL)	8:18:04	Terenzo Bozzone (NZL)	8:25:36	Dirk Bockel (LUX)	8:27:11	
Australia	Patrick Vernay (NCL)	8:24:53	Pete Jacobs (AUS)	8:29:03	Tim Berkel (AUS)	8:31:43	
South Africa	Marino Vanhoenacker (BEL)	8:17:33	Michael Göhner (GER)	8:32:02	Petr Vabrousek (CZE)	8:36:08	
China	Rasmus Henning (DEN)	8:53:20	Patrick Walliman (SUI)	9:22:46	Mike Schifferle (SUI)	9:28:49	
Lanzarote	Bert Jammaer (BEL)	8:54:03	Stephan Vuckovic (GER)	8:57:17	Olaf Sabatschus (GER)	8:59:03	
Brazil	Eduardo Sturla (ARG)	8:13:39	Reinaldo Colucci (BRA)	8::28:08	Petr Vabrousek (CZE)	8:37:18	
Japan	Luke McKenzie (AUS)	8:28:31	Courtney Ogden (AUS)	8:42:54	Petr Vabrousek (CZE)	8:45:59	
Coeur d'Alene	Francisco Pontano (ESP)	8:32:12	T. J. Tollakson (USA)	8:42:03	Maximilian Longree (GER)	8:50:19	
France	Marcel Zamora Perez (ESP)	8:30:06	Hervé Faure (FRA)	8:40:55	Simon Billeau (FRA)	8:46:30	
Germany	Timo Bracht (GER)	7:59:15	Eneko Llanos (ESP)	8:00:05	Chris McCormack (AUS)	8:02:49	
Austria	Marino Vanhoenacker (BEL)	8:01:38	James Cunnama (RSA)	8:14:18	Stephen Bayliss (GBR)	8:17:06	
Switzerland	Ronnie Schildknecht (SUI)	8:20:00	Stefan Riesen (SUI)	8:31:10	Torsten Abel (GER)	8:36:38	
Lake Placid	Maik Twelsiek (GER)	8:36:37	Christian Brader (GER)	8:56:35	Jason Shortis (AUS)	8:58:09	
UK	Philip Graves (GBR)	8:45:51	Stephen Bayliss (GBR)	8:48:29	Jarmo Hast (FIN)	8:57:58	
Canada	Jordan Rapp (USA)	8:25:13	Mike Aigroz (SUI)	8:40:17	Courtney Ogden (AUS)	8:44:37	
Louisville	Viktor Zyemtsev (UKR)	8:25:27	Luke McKenzie (AUS)	8:26:01	Raynard Tissink (RSA)	8:39:09	

==== Women ====
Event	Gold	Time	Silver	Time	Bronze	Time	Reference
Wisconsin	Hillary Biscay (USA)	9:47:25	Karin Gerber (SUI)	9:49:46	Jessica Jacobs (USA)	9:50:45	
World Champs 08	Chrissie Wellington (GBR)	9:06:23	Yvonne van Vlerken (NLD)	9:21:20	Sandra Wallenhorst (GER)	9:22:52	
Florida	Bella Comerford (GBR)	9:07:49	Tamara Kozulina (UKR)	9:14:15	Jessica Jacobs (USA)	9:17:51	
Arizona	Heleen Bij De Vaate (NLD)	9:21:06	Leanda Cave (USA)	9:25:07	Edith Niederfriniger (ITA)	9:28:09	
Western Australia	Gina Ferguson (NZL)	8:59:24	Charlotte Paul (AUS)	9:06:34	Kat Baker (AUS)	9:37:24	
Malaysia	Belinda Granger (AUS)	9:21:10	Nicole Leder (GER)	9:36:40	Maki Nishiuchi (JPN)	9:57:13	
New Zealand	Gina Ferguson (NZL)	9:18:25	Joanna Lawn (NZL)	9:23:07	Charlotte Paul (AUS)	9:30:24	
Australia	Chrissie Wellington (GBR)	8:57:10	Rebekah Keat (AUS)	9:21:33	Caroline Steffen (SUI)	9:38:44	
South Africa	Lucie Zelenkova (CZE)	9:16:32	Sonja Tajsich (GER)	9:27:59	Rachel Joyce (GBR)	9:37:00	
China	Charlotte Paul (AUS)	9:48:14	Edith Niederfriniger (ITA)	10:01:39	Teresa Mazel (CZE)	10:13:43	
Lanzarote	Bella Bayliss (GBR)	9:54:58	Rachel Joyce (GBR)	10:15:05	Michaela Giger (SUI)	10:15:41	
Brazil	Dede Griesbauer (USA)	9:10:15	Charlotte Kolters (DEN)	9:18:49	Heather Gollnick (USA)	9:31:42	
Japan	Nicole Klingler (LIE)	9:52:52	Nicole Ward (AUS)	9:56:00	Megumi Shigaki (JPN)	10:01:07	
Coeur d'Alene	Tyler Stewart (USA)	9:23:21	Kate Major (AUS)	9:32:10	Heather Wuertele (CAN)	9:34:24	
France	Tina Deckers (BEL)	9:30:29	Christel Robin (FRA)	9:34:19	Martina Dogana (ITA)	9:37:35	
Germany	Sandra Wallenhorst (GER)	8:58:08	Yvonne van Vlerken (NLD)	9:02:17	Nicole Leder (GER)	9:05:15	
Austria	Bella Bayliss (GBR)	8:50:13	Sonja Tajsich (GER)	8:59:45	Lucie Zelenkova (CZE)	9:07:24	
Switzerland	Sibylle Matter (SUI)	9:14:35	Monika Lehmann (SUI)	9:25:05	Lisbeth Kristensen (DEN)	9:25:37	
Lake Placid	Tereza Macel (CZE)	9:29:36	Caitlin Snow (USA)	9:41:21	Samantha McGlone (USA)	9:44:24	
UK	Bella Bayliss (GBR)	9:33:59	Abigail Bayley (GBR)	9:46:15	Irene Kinnegim (NLD)	10:06:40	
Canada	Tereza Macel (CZE)	9:11:20	Belinda Granger (AUS)	9:40:48	Janelle Morrison (CAN)	9:48:54	
Louisville	Nina Kraft (GER)	9:20:21	Lisbeth Kristensen (DEN)	9:23:57	Kim Loeffler (USA)	9:38:23	
