= 2003 ITU Long Distance Triathlon World Championships =

International sports competition

World Long Distance Triathlon Championships
- Location: Ibiza, Spain
- Date: May 11, 2023

Champions
- Men: Eneko Llanos Burguera (Spain)
- Women: Virginia Berasategi (Spain)

The 2023 ITU Long Distance Triathlon World Championships was a triathlon competition held in Ibiza in Spain on May 11, 2023, and organized by the International Triathlon Union, now World Triathlon. This was the tenth edition of the competition inaugurated in 1994.

The Elite races for men and women consisted of a 4 km (2.5 mi) swim, 120 km (75 mi) bike and 30 km (19 mi) run, longer than the standard 1.5 km swim, 40 km bike and 10 km run associated with the World Triathlon Championship Series and the Olympic Games, but shorter than the classic Ironman Triathlon event.

A series of age-group amateur championships were held as part of the event.

The event was a marked success for the hosts as both elite titles were won by Spanish triathletes; Eneko Llanos in the men's event, and Virginia Berasategi Luna in the women's event.

== Medal Summary ==
Event	Gold		Silver		Bronze	
Men	Eneko Llanos Burguera; Spain	5:37:15	Rutger Beke; Belgium	5:38:26	Xavier Le Floch; France	5:38:58
Women	Virginia Berasategi; Spain	6:19:20	Ana Burgos Acuña; Spain	6:20:14	Sione Jongstra; Netherlands	6:30:53

== Results ==
The following are the results of the elite races:

=== Men ===
74 men started the event, of which 64 reached the finish line, led by home athlete Eneko Llanos, just over a minute ahead of Belgian Rutger Beke .

Rank	Athlete	Nation	Swim	T1	Bike	T2	Run	Overall time
1st place, gold medalist(s)	Eneko Llanos Burguera	Spain	47:32	2:02	2:57:22	0:58	1:52:19	5:37:15
2nd place, silver medalist(s)	Rutger Beke	Belgium	49:38	1:54	2:59:54	1:03	1:48:54	5:38:26
3rd place, bronze medalist(s)	Xavier Le Floch	France	49:48	2:09	2:59:49	0:51	1:49:21	5:38:58
4	Marcel Zamora Pérez	Spain	49:42	1:43	2:59:49	0:58	1:51:28	5:41:00
5	Mika Luoto	Finland	49:33	1:42	3:00:05	0:46	1:51:43	5:41:23
6	Torbjorn Sindballe	Denmark	48:59	1:53	3:00:29	0:43	1:53:52	5:43:21
7	Frank Heldoorn	Netherlands	49:42	1:58	2:59:52	0:41	1:54:18	5:43:52
8	Kai Soderdahl	Finland	49:43	2:09	2:59:55	0:58	1:54:49	5:44:29
9	Gilles Reboul	France	49:39	2:13	2:59:55	0:56	1:55:28	5:45:04
10	Normann Stadler	Germany	51:19	1:52	2:58:19	1:03	1:55:27	5:45:06
11	Petr Vabrousek	Czech Republic	51:18	2:20	3:00:59	1:03	1:52:48	5:45:06
12	Alejandro Santamaria Perez	Spain	51:19	2:02	3:06:27	0:58	1:47:58	5:45:43
13	Mitch Dean	Australia	46:49	1:50	3:02:44	0:59	1:56:19	5:45:53
14	Patrick Vernay	France	46:57	2:05	3:02:42	0:39	1:57:29	5:47:09
15	Cyrille Neveu	France	47:30	2:16	3:02:07	1:34	1:58:48	5:48:27
16	Frederic Kohl	Austria	49:30	1:52	3:00:04	0:41	1:59:36	5:49:11
17	Jan Vodehnal	Czech Republic	51:20	1:58	3:06:35	0:41	1:53:10	5:51:07
18	Bruno Von Ilih	Switzerland	51:13	2:33	3:01:04	0:56	1:59:23	5:51:41
19	Marino Vanhoenacker	Belgium	49:44	2:01	2:59:47	1:03	2:03:04	5:52:37
20	Jan Strangmuller	Czech Republic	49:47	2:15	2:59:47	1:08	2:04:08	5:53:44
21	Diego Gazzari	Italy	49:48	2:09	2:59:55	1:04	2:04:31	5:54:16
22	Steffen Liebetrau	Germany	49:32	1:56	2:59:57	1:08	2:06:07	5:55:37
23	Ronnie Schildknecht	Switzerland	54:40	2:12	2:59:35	1:01	2:01:58	5:56:14
24	Alessandro Alessandri	Italy	1:00:26	2:02	3:12:21	0:54	1:45:03	5:57:50
25	Guido Gosselink	Netherlands	49:42	2:02	2:59:54	1:03	2:08:55	5:58:31
26	Lino Barruncho	Portugal	58:20	2:43	3:09:22	1:04	1:51:09	5:58:53
27	Richard Jones	United Kingdom	48:41	2:13	3:03:55	0:46	2:08:10	6:00:48
28	Marc Bamert	Switzerland	51:06	2:16	3:06:42	0:44	2:03:31	6:01:20
29	Stefan Arvay	Austria	49:44	2:04	3:08:06	1:03	2:04:53	6:02:46
30	Casper Van Den Burgh	Netherlands	46:52	2:00	3:02:46	1:03	2:13:40	6:03:19
31	Juan Izquierdo	Spain	51:25	2:37	3:16:21	1:01	1:56:10	6:03:57
32	Michael Elmshoj	Denmark	51:21	2:10	3:09:56	0:58	2:02:50	6:04:07
33	Margus Tamm	Estonia	54:32	2:04	3:06:52	1:08	2:02:53	6:04:20
34	Maurizio Carta	Italy	53:05	2:46	3:04:57	1:23	2:07:55	6:05:56
35	Philippe Achleitner	Switzerland	46:56	2:05	3:06:10	1:01	2:13:11	6:06:18
36	Sergio Marques	Portugal	57:13	2:20	3:10:33	1:27	1:59:01	6:06:47
37	Kim Visby Jensen	Denmark	52:49	2:36	3:05:16	1:11	2:08:50	6:06:55
38	Lukas Vrobel	Czech Republic	49:37	2:55	3:17:59	1:18	1:59:45	6:07:21
39	Simon Kennedy	United Kingdom	47:45	2:06	3:01:55	0:51	2:18:14	6:07:56
40	Rene Rovera	France	51:09	1:53	3:10:23	1:46	2:06:23	6:07:56
41	Tamas Petr	Czech Republic	49:49	2:16	3:12:48	1:39	2:06:07	6:08:45
42	Thomas Nielsen	Denmark	51:18	2:15	3:09:39	1:06	2:08:15	6:09:14
43	Russel Kober	United Kingdom	52:52	2:17	3:08:20	1:34	2:08:13	6:09:27
44	Fernando Marian De Diego	Spain	51:15	2:08	3:11:24	1:18	2:07:16	6:09:54
45	Ted As	Sweden	56:13	2:19	3:07:36	0:53	2:08:39	6:12:28
46	Cecilio Perez	Spain	54:50	1:50	3:14:18	1:08	2:04:02	6:13:10
47	Alexander Frühwirth	Austria	51:29	2:32	3:19:31	1:13	2:03:59	6:15:00
48	Gerrit Depauw	Belgium	49:46	2:09	3:13:25	1:10	2:11:58	6:15:10
49	Richard Rosenkranz	United States	53:07	2:12	3:14:41	1:18	2:08:06	6:15:57
50	Eliot Challofour	United Kingdom	51:18	2:17	3:09:58	1:13	2:15:15	6:16:34
51	Clas Bjoerling	Sweden	59:05	2:25	3:08:28	1:35	2:09:20	6:16:53
52	Balázs Polonyi	Hungary	53:06	2:31	3:16:29	0:56	2:07:26	6:17:01
53	Shigenob Kegata	Japan	53:02	2:13	3:08:20	1:06	2:17:56	6:19:18
54	Konrad Von Allmen	Switzerland	1:01	2:36	3:16:28	0:54	2:01:26	6:19:38
55	Gunther Swoboda	Namibia	54:45	2:48	3:09:31	1:03	2:17:16	6:21:35
56	Jared Berg	United States	51:08	2:32	3:12:50	1:06	2:18:27	6:22:27
57	Shiji Tsutsumi	Japan	54:49	2:09	3:16:39	1:03	2:13:42	6:25:12
58	Alexander Durst	United States	55:44	2:31	3:15:15	1:16	2:18:35	6:29:34
59	Cameron Loos	United States	51:13	2:40	3:26:01	1:11	2:16:07	6:33:20
60	Alistair Duffield	Ireland	51:55	3:23	3:19:08	1:11	2:23:23	6:34:26
61	Michael Prince	Australia	49:43	2:41	3:19:13	1:23	2:28:59	6:37:55
62	Naoya Yasuda	Japan	1:00	3:30	3:22:12	0:58	2:15:58	6:39:06
63	Ioanis Mastrosavakis	Greece	1:00	3:09	3:18:31	1:04	2:23:10	6:42:23
64	Neill Darby	Ireland	59:56	2:52	3:22:12	1:08	2:20:23	6:42:32
-	Stefan Riesen	Switzerland	58:24	2:30	-	-	-	DNF
-	Jacques Lepen	Monaco	49:40	2:26	-	-	-	DNF
-	Faris Al-Sultan	Germany	46:47	2:20	-	-	-	DNF
-	Gianpietro De Faveri	Italy	46:59	2:07	3:02:42	1:19	-	DNF
-	Gary Mandy	South Africa	54:39	2:37	3:22:25	1:14	-	DNF
-	Francois Chabaud	France	49:36	2:17	2:59:56	0:47	-	DNF
-	Marco Stradi	Italy	49:58	2:15	3:11:28	1:13	-	DNF
-	Rolf Lautenbacher	Germany	49:52	2:16	3:07:53	0:42	-	DNF
-	Jari Vuorinen	Finland	56:46	2:26	5:16:11	-	-	DNF
Key : DNF - did not finish ; DNS - did not start

=== Women ===
24 athlete's took the start in the women's race, and 21 finishers were led home by home athlete Virginia Berasategi, 56 seconds ahead of compariot Ana Burgos.

Rank	Athlete	Nation	Swim	T1	Bike	T2	Run	Overall time
1st place, gold medalist(s)	Virginia Berasategi	Spain	51:56	2:10	3:15:25	1:15	2:12:00	6:19:20
2nd place, silver medalist(s)	Ana Burgos Acuña	Spain	51:54	2:10	3:27:16	0:59	2:01:04	6:20:14
3rd place, bronze medalist(s)	Sione Jongstra	Netherlands	55:38	2:17	3:23:16	0:58	2:11:58	6:30:53
4	Bella Bayliss	United Kingdom	58:07	2:00	3:25:43	0:58	2:07:07	6:31:00
5	Edith Niederfriniger	Italy	51:57	2:15	3:32:53	1:03	2:09:41	6:34:31
6	Helene Salomon-Watson	France	56:47	0:19	3:25:58	1:03	2:14:59	6:37:45
7	Lisbeth Kristensen	Denmark	52:26	2:16	3:24:18	1:18	2:23:06	6:39:50
8	Ariane Gutknecht	Switzerland	58:40	2:01	3:26:06	1:13	2:17:40	6:42:27
9	Martina Dogana	Italy	58:04	2:48	3:31:05	0:51	2:16:21	6:45:31
10	Tiina Boman	Finland	58:02	2:36	3:26:47	1:13	2:21:41	6:46:30
11	Cristina Azanza Moreno	Spain	55:33	2:04	3:32:43	1:34	2:18:22	6:46:38
12	Inmaculada Pereiro Gonzalez	Spain	1:12:38	2:21	3:28:42	0:44	2:07:31	6:48:50
13	Manuela Ianesi	Italy	51:14	2:09	3:33:45	1:13	2:27:11	6:52:12
14	Gabriela Loskotova	Czech Republic	57:44	3:03	3:35:08	1:33	2:20:37	6:53:28
15	Julie Hansen Bollerup	Denmark	1:01:12	2:06	3:31:19	1:10	2:22:50	6:55:21
16	Karin Forsberg	Sweden	54:03	2:47	3:33:17	1:33	2:31:07	6:58:27
17	Deanna Newman	United States	1:02:59	2:59	3:38:17	0:51	2:24:22	7:05:39
18	Nicole Klingler	Liechtenstein	1:06:22	2:51	3:39:35	0:53	2:20:21	7:06:18
19	Wendy Mcmillan	United Kingdom	1:06:55	2:59	3:46:50	1:06	2:46:22	7:40:08
20	Chiharu Chiba	Japan	57:39	2:21	3:49:15	1:13	2:57:32	7:44:26
21	Sonny Eschette	Luxembourg	1:12:48	5:03	4:02:06	1:39	2:43:28	7:58:23
-	Wenke Kujala	Germany	1:00:37	2:22	3:42:58	0:54	-	DNF
-	Erika Csomor	Hungary	1:01:35	2:38	3:20:02	1:08	-	DNF
-	Sophie Delemer	France	52:52	2:13	3:25:03	0:58	-	DNF
Key : DNF - did not finish ; DNS - did not start

== Age group championship ==
A series of age-group championship races for amateur athletes was also held. The winners of each classification are listed below.

Classification	Athlete	Overall time
20-24 Female AG	Sarah Lorenz (GER)	7:23:26
25-29 Female AG	Sara Gross (GBR)	6:53:34
30-34 Female AG	Andrea Wendt (GER)	7:08:36
35-39 Female AG	Francoise Wellekens (BEL)	6:51:11
40-44 Female AG	Tracey Slade (GBR)	7:32:49
45-49 Female AG	Summer Govan (GBR)	8:01:55
50-54 Female AG	Terese Van Lare (NED)	7:43:35
55-59 Female AG	Anne Addrison (GBR)	9:15:31
20-24 Male AG	Stephen Bayliss (GBR)	6:15:44
25-29 Male AG	Werner Uberbacher (ITA)	6:08:14
30-34 Male AG	Hassan Doudouch (FRA)	6:18:12
35-39 Male AG	Jose Luis Cano Villanueva (ESP)	6:09:44
40-44 Male AG	Johan Callebaut (BEL)	6:05:42
45-49 Male AG	Rodolphe Von Berg (BEL)	6:28:19
50-54 Male AG	Yves Tabarant (FRA)	6:10:09
55-59 Male AG	Mink Zeilstra (NED)	6:50:53
60-64 Male AG	Paul Hartmut (BEL)	7:18:04
65-69 Male AG	Daisaku Momino (JPN)	9:07:50
70-74 Male AG	John Graney (POR)	9:25:27
