= Pete Jacobs (triathlete) =

Australian triathlete

Personal information
- Nickname: PJ
- Born: 27 October 1981 (age 45) Sydney
- Height: 1.79 m (6 ft)
- Weight: 70 kg (154 lb)

Sport
- Country: Australia
- Sport: Triathlon
- Turned pro: 2004
Medal record
Representing Australia
Men's triathlon
Ironman World Championship
Gold medal – first place	2012	Individual
Silver medal – second place	2011	Individual

Pete Jacobs (born 27 October 1981) is an Australian professional triathlete competing primarily in long-distance, non-drafting triathlon events. He is the winner of the 2012 Ironman World Championship.

== Athletic career ==
Jacobs was born to parents Jenny and Geoff in Sydney, Australia and raised in the Northern Beaches area. He grew up following his mother to local triathlon events but took to surf lifesaving as well as cross country running growing up, but states that he never took running seriously at that point. Jacobs started competing in triathlon at the age of 18. During his training at the pool for surf lifesaving he meet other triathletes that helped guide him into the sport. It wasn't until after four years in a landscaping apprenticeship, which he started right out of school, that he decided to turn pro.

Jacobs first Ironman victory came in 2011 at the Ironman Australia event after numerous top 5 placings in Ironman and Challenge Roth triathlon events. He routinely posts the top swim and run times at his racing events, and even posted the third fastest run time on the Ironman World Championship course in 2011. It wasn't until his win at the 2012 Ironman World Championship did the three-time Hawaii Ironman top ten finisher posted his breakthrough performance where he won by five minutes over second-place finisher Andreas Raelert.

In 2014 Jacobs received criticism from Ironman CEO Andrew Messick, who accused him of having a lack of professionalism when he claimed his automatic qualifying spot for the 2014 Ironman World Championship at Ironman Switzerland. In that race he finished with a time of 11:42, last among pro men and 970th overall. Jacobs first responded to his comments via Twitter by calling Messick a "troll." A month later, before the championship, he formally replied to Messick on his website offering an explanation for his performance in Zurich; which he attributed to season-long fatigue. The two later met privately to put their dispute at rest.

Jacobs works with the coaching service BPM-Sport.

== Notable results ==
Some of Jacobs' notable achievements include:

Results list

Date	Event	Place
2014	2014 Ironman World Championship	DNF
2014	Ironman Switzerland	15th
2014	Challenge Roth	19th
2014	Ironman 70.3 Oceanside	25th
2013	Challenge Laguna Phuket	9th
2013	2013 Ironman World Championship	32nd
2013	Escape from Alcatraz Triathlon	4th
2013	Ironman 70.3 Sunshine Coast	1st
2013	Ironman 70.3 Philippines	2nd
2012	2012 Ironman World Championship	1st
2012	Ironman Lake Placid	2nd
2012	LA 5150 Triathlon	6th
2012	Ironman 70.3 Syracuse	4th
2011	2011 Ironman World Championship	2nd
2011	Ironman 70.3 Philippines	1st
2011	Ironman Australia	1st
2011	Ironman 70.3 Singapore	3rd
2010	Ironman Western Australia	3rd
2010	2010 Ironman World Championship	8th
2010	Ironman 70.3 Philippines	1st
2010	Challenge Roth	4th
2010	Australian long course Championships	2nd
2009	2009 Ironman World Championship	8th
2009	Ironman 70.3 Philippines	4th
2009	Challenge Roth	2nd
2009	Ironman Australia	2nd
2009	Ironman 70.3 Singapore	4th
2009	Australian long course Championships	1st
2008	Canberra Half Ironman	2nd
2008	Ironman 70.3 Singapore	3rd
2008	Challenge Roth	2nd
2008	Busselton Half Ironman	1st
2008	Ironman New Zealand	5th
2007	Australian Long Course Championships	2nd
2007	Busselton Half Ironman	1st
2007	Challenge Roth	3rd
2007	Ironman Korean	12th
2006	Busselton Half Ironman	1st
2006	Ironman 70.3 UK	2nd
2006	Ironman 70.3 Antwerp	3rd
2006	ITU Holten Olympic Triathlon	8th
2006	2006 Ironman World Championship	17th
