= Andreas Raelert =

German triathlete

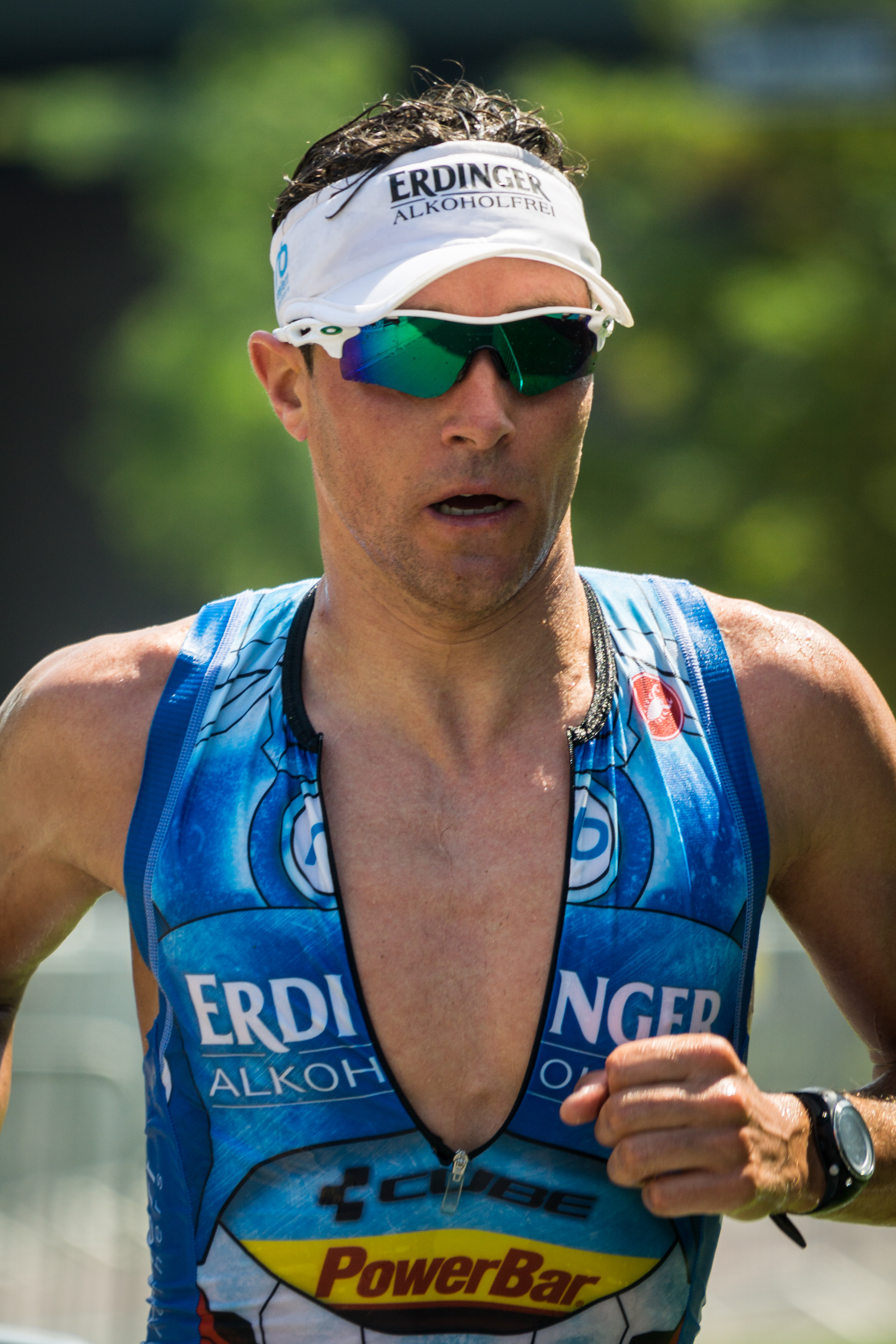

Medal record

Representing Germany

Men's triathlon

Ironman World Championship 70.3
Silver medal – second place	2008	Elite

Ironman World Championship
Silver medal – second place	2015	Elite
Silver medal – second place	2012	Elite
Silver medal – second place	2010	Elite
Bronze medal – third place	2011	Elite
Bronze medal – third place	2009	Elite

Andreas Raelert (born 11 August 1976) is a German triathlete. His younger brother, Michael Raelert, is also a triathlete.

On 10 July 2011, Raelert broke the world record time for an Ironman Triathlon distance race at the Challenge Roth event in Roth, Germany. Finishing in a time of 7 hours, 41 minutes and 33 seconds, he beat Marino Vanhoenacker's record time of 7:45:58 set just a week before. However, since Raelert’s time was not at an official Ironman event, Vanhoenacker’s time remains the fastest at an Ironman-sanctioned event.

Raelert competed in the first Olympic triathlon event at the 2000 Sydney Olympics. He took twelfth place with a total time of 1:49:31.28. He competed again four years later, at the 2004 Athens Olympics. This time, he achieved sixth place with a time of 1:52:35.62 on the more difficult course.

In 2008, Raelert won the silver at the 2008 70.3 Ironman World Championships.

Raelert finished 2nd in the 2010, 2012 and 2015 Ironman World Championships. He also collected a 3rd-place finish at the 2011 Championship event.
