= Michael J. Prince =

Canadian political scientist and scholar

Michael J. Prince CM
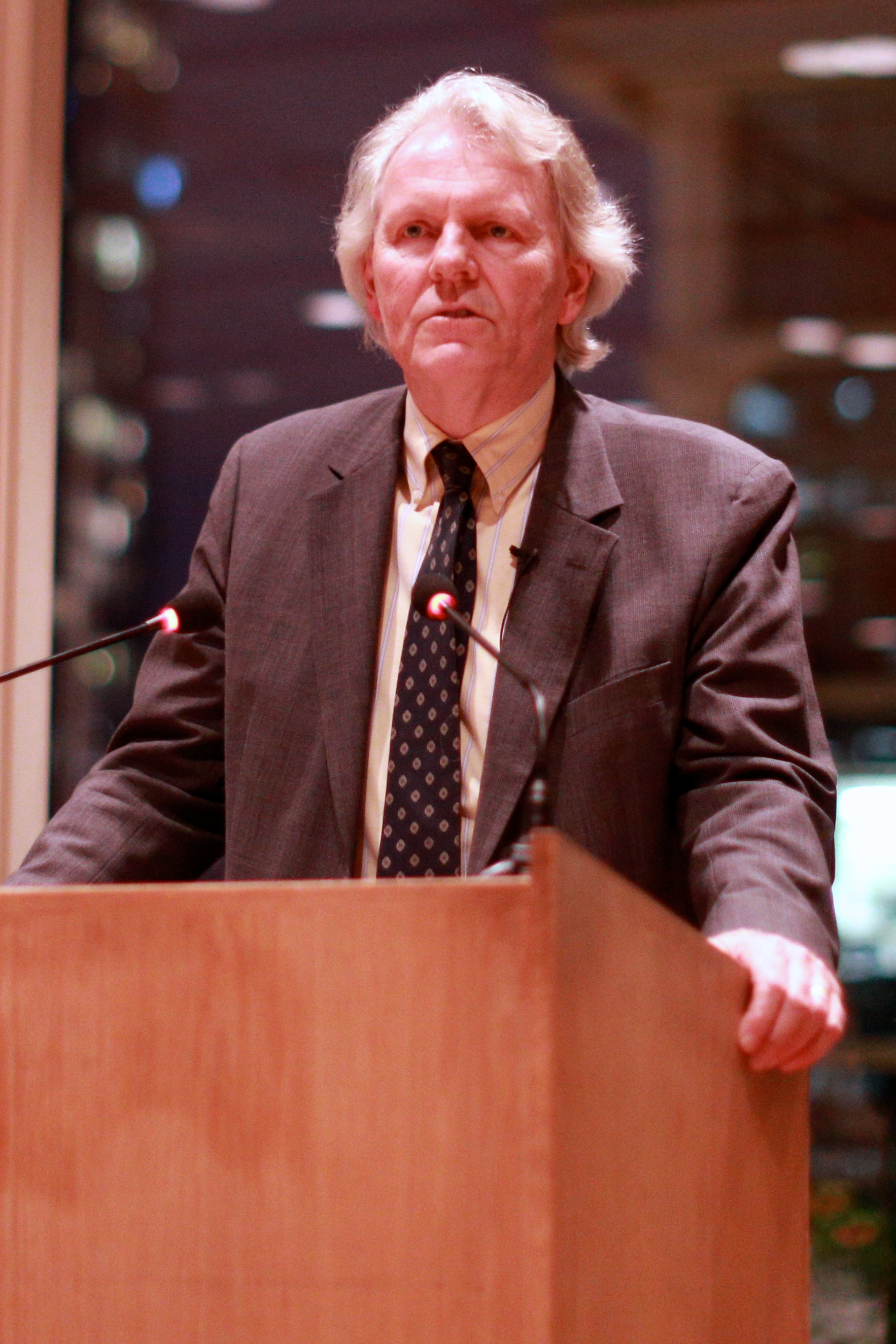

1st Lansdowne Professor of Social Policy at the University of Victoria

Personal details
- Profession: Academic, professor, author, policy advisor, community activist

Michael J. Prince CM is a Canadian political scientist and public policy and administration scholar. Prince is the Emeritus Lansdowne Professor of Social Policy at the University of Victoria in Canada.

== Academic career ==
Prince received his PhD in Politics from the University of Exeter in 1979. He is also a graduate of Carleton University and Queen's University. Between 1978 and 1987 he was lecturer, assistant professor, and then associate professor in the School of Public Administration at Carleton University. He took up his position at the University of Victoria in 1987, as the inaugural Lansdowne Chair in Social Policy, and retired from the University of Victoria in June 2025. Prince is acknowledged nationally and internationally as a leading authority on Canadian social policy and disability issues. He has been a visiting scholar at the University of Edinburgh and Massey College at the University of Toronto as well as an invited speaker at universities of Cambridge, Glasgow, Kent, London, Oxford, Ulster, Washington, and York. He has spoken at an APEC workshop in Mexico, an International Disability Research Conference in the United States, and presented at the United Nations. Prince has led major Canadian research programs including a six-year (2009-2014) SSHRC community-university research alliance entitled, Disabling Poverty, Enabling Citizenship. In 1994-95, he was the research director to the House of Commons Standing Committee on Human Resources Development for a major social security review by the Government of Canada. He has also advised federal and provincial government ministries, departments and agencies in relation to electoral systems, employment programming, social housing, and disability income maintenance.

== Activism and community engagement ==
Prince has been a board member of a community health clinic, legal aid society, hospital society and hospital foundation, provincial association for community living, the advisory committee on children and youth with special needs to the Representative of Children and Youth for British Columbia, and the social policy committee of the Council of Canadians with Disabilities.

From 2015 to 2018, Prince served on the board of directors of Inclusion BC, a non-profit organization, which promotes the participation of people with developmental disabilities in all areas of community life.

In the policy world, he has made the analytical case for a medium-term sickness or disability income benefit program for Canadians. Prince is a frequent commentator in Canadian media on matters of government, politics, and numerous public policy issues. As well, he has been an in-studio analyst for a number of general elections.

In 2014, Prince authored a report that presented a range of policy reform options to both the federal government and to provincial/territorial governments, the aim of which is to substantively improve the material living conditions of people with disabilities and their families.

In 2015, a 468-page e-book was produced bringing together research produced by the community-university research alliance led by Michael J. Prince and Yvonne Peters as the principal researchers.

In 2016, the Institute for Research on Public Policy published a study by Prince that outlines a six-point action plan on inclusive and real employment opportunities for persons with disabilities.

In 2017, the Broadbent Institute published a report by Prince on enhancing the adequacy of disability income assistance.

In 2017, Prince was invited to be an inaugural member of the Scientific Council to The School of Public Policy at the University of Calgary.

In July 2018, Prince became the Board Chair of Community Living BC, a provincial crown corporation mandated to provide a range of supports and services for adults with developmental disabilities, fetal alcohol spectrum disorder and autism spectrum disorder.

In April 2020, Prince was appointed to the COVID-19 Disability Advisory Group, by Minister Carla Qualtrough, Minister of Employment, Workforce Development & Disability Inclusion, Government of Canada. The Group advises the Minister on the real-time lived experiences of persons with disabilities during this crisis on disability-specific issues, challenges and systemic gaps and on strategies, measures and steps to be taken.

In 2021, the BC Government reappointed Prince to a second term as Board Chair of Community Living BC from 1 July 2021, to 30 June 2024. In his second term, Dr. Prince helped oversee the development of CLBC’s next strategic plan to support efforts to improve Indigenous relations, enhance access to inclusive housing, and increase employment.

In 2024, the Nova Scotia Human Rights Commission appointed Prince to serve as the Expert Monitor to undertake monitoring the implementation of a systemic human rights remedy in Nova Scotia. This role is to conduct reviews and make recommendations, over the next five years, to ensure the Province is making substantial progress and eliminating system discrimination in the provision of social services and supports to persons with disabilities in that province.

In April 2024, Prince publicly resigned from the Ministerial Disability Advisory Group to the federal Minister of Disability and Inclusion, over the serious inadequacies in the design of the Canada Disability Benefit, unveiled in the federal budget.

== Awards and recognition ==
In 2007, Dr. Prince received a President’s Award from the Canadian Association for Community Living, in recognition of "exceptional contribution to Canadians’ understanding of public policy that builds an inclusive and accessible Canada." In 2011, he received the University of Victoria Community Leadership Award. In 2012, Professor Prince was presented a Queen Elizabeth II Diamond Jubilee Medal for his public services. Dr. Prince was named Academic of the Year in 2014 by the Confederation of Faculty Associations of British Columbia. Awarded, with his co-authors, the 2014 Donald Smiley Prize by the Canadian Political Science Association, for Public Budgeting in the Age of Crises: Canada’s Shifting Budgetary Domains and Temporal Budgeting, as the best book published in English or French in the field relating to the study of government and politics in Canada in the previous year.

In the 2022 book by acclaimed journalist Mark Bulgutch, Inspiring Canadians, Prince was featured as one of forty Canadians and their visions to make the country a better place for all. The chapter on Prince focused on ensuring dignity for people living with disabilities.

On 18 December 2024, Prince was appointed as a Member of the Order of Canada for his 'significant contributions to disability rights in Canada.' Prince was also cited for his 'dedicated activism and advocacy for inclusion and accessibility.'

== Notable ideas ==
Often in collaborations, Prince has made substantive contributions to understanding, in the Canadian context, expenditure and revenue budgeting by governments; disability politics and policy; instruments of governing, including regulation and the regulatory state; and the history and contemporary state of social policy. He has elaborated on the concept of stealth as a reform process and articulated a political theory of universality in relation to income security, health care and social services.

Among the concepts he has developed are Aristotle’s benchmarks, blue rinse politics, civic regulation, déjà vu discourse, directed incrementalism, fiscalization of social policy, gently coercive governing, the Hobbesian prime minister, regulatory welfarism, and supply side social policy. With respect to intergovernmental relations or multi-level governance, Prince has theorized notions of actuarial federalism, deliberative federalism, provincial spending power and sociopolitical province building and, for Aboriginal peoples and their political organizations, the hide-and-seek politics of federalism.

With respect to critical disability studies, Prince has elaborated the concepts of disability governance and normalcy/disability relations.

== Selected published works ==
=== Books ===
- Universality and Social Policy in Canada, (with Daniel Beland and Gregory Marchildon), Toronto: University of Toronto Press, 2019. ISBN 978-1-4426-3649-1
- Struggling for Social Citizenship: Income Security, Disabled Canadians and Prime Ministerial Eras, Montreal and Kingston: McGill-Queen’s University Press, 2016. ISBN 9780773547049
- Weary Warriors: Knowledge, Power, and the Invisible Wounds of Soldiers, (with Pamela Moss), New York and Oxford: Berghahn Books, 2014. ISBN 978-1-78238-346-8
- Rules and Unruliness: Canadian Regulatory Democracy, Governance, Capitalism, and Welfarism, (with Bruce Doern and Richard Schultz), Montreal and Kingston: McGill-Queen’s University Press, 2014. ISBN 978-0-7735-4333-1
- Public Budgeting in the Age of Crises: Canada’s Shifting Budgetary Domains and Temporal Budgeting, (with Bruce Doern and Allan Maslove), Montreal and Kingston: McGill-Queen’s University Press, 2013. ISBN 978-0-7735-4168-9
- Changing Politics of Canadian Social Policy, Second Edition, (with James Rice) Toronto: University of Toronto Press, 2013. ISBN 978-1-4426-1217-4
- Three Bio-Realms: Biotechnology and the Governance of Food, Health, and Life in Canada, (with Bruce Doern) Toronto: University of Toronto Press, 2012. ISBN 978-1-4426-1154-2
- Absent Citizens: Disability Politics and Policy in Canada, Toronto: University of Toronto Press, 2009. ISBN 978-0-8020-9630-2
- When We're 65: Reforming Canada's Retirement Income System (with John Burbidge et al), Toronto: C.D. Howe Institute, 1996. ISBN 0-88806-359-8
- Public Budgeting in Canada: Politics, Economics and Management, (with Bruce Doern and Allan Maslove), Ottawa: Carleton University Press, 1988. ISBN 0-88629-069-4
- Federal and Provincial Budgeting: Goalsetting, Coordination, Restraint and Reform, (with Bruce Doern and Allan Maslove) Toronto: University of Toronto Press, 1986. ISBN 0-8020-7286-0
- Policy Advice and Organizational Survival, Aldershot, Hants: Gower Publishing, 1983. ISBN 0-566-00457-7

=== Edited books ===
- Disabling Poverty and Enabling Citizenship, (with Yvonne Peters and associates), Winnipeg: Council of Canadians with Disabilities, 2015. ISBN 978-0-9940638-0-9
- Policy: From Ideas to Implementation, (with Glen Toner and Leslie Pal), Montreal and Kingston: McGill-Queen’s University Press, 2010. ISBN 978-0-7735-3715-6
- Changing the Rules: Canadian Regulatory Regimes and Institutions, (with Bruce Doern, Margaret Hill, and Rick Schultz), Toronto: University of Toronto Press, 1999. ISBN 0-8020-8025-1
- How Ottawa Spends 1987-88: Restraining the State, Toronto: Methuen Publishers, 1987. ISBN 0-458-80740-0
- How Ottawa Spends 1986-87: Tracking the Tories, Toronto: Methuen Publishers, 1986. ISBN 0-458-80140-2

=== Journal articles ===
- "Persons with invisible disabilities and workplace accommodations: Findings form a scoping literature review," Journal of Vocational Rehabilitation, Vol. 46 (1), 2017, 75-86.
- "Prime Minister as Moral Crusader: Stephen Harper’s Punitive Turn in Social Policy Making," Canadian Review of Social Policy, Issue 71, 2015, 53-69.
- "The Universal in the Social: Universalism, Universality, and Universalization in Canadian Politics and Public Policy," Canadian Public Administration, Vol. 57, No. 3, 2014, pp. 344–361.
- "Integrated and Individualized Service Provision for People with Disabilities: Promising Practices in Liberal Welfare States," Journal of Comparative Policy Analysis, Vol. 13, No. 5, 2011, pp. 545–560.
- "Four Pathways to Aboriginal Self-Government in Canada," (with Frances Abele), American Review of Canadian Studies, Vol. 36, No. 1, winter 2006, pp. 568–95.
- "La Petite Vision, Les Grands Decisions: Chrétien’s Paradoxical Record in Social Policy," Review of Constitutional Studies, 2004, Vol. 9, No. 1 & 2, pp. 199–219.
- "Social Policy Reform and the Rediscovery of Community and Family Support for the Aged," Journal of Ethics, Law, and Aging, Vol. 4, No. 2, 1998, pp. 85–90.
- "The Rise and Fall of Policy Planning and Research Units: An Organizational Perspective," (with John Chenier) Canadian Public Administration, 1980, Vol. 23, No. 4, pp. 519–541. Reprinted in Classics in Canadian Public Administration, edited by Barbara Wake Carroll, David Siegel and Mark Sproule-Jones, Toronto: Oxford University Press, 2005, pp. 463–83, as one of the best articles published on Canadian public administration before 1985.
- "Drawing hidden figures of disability: youth and adults with disabilities in Canada," Evidence & Policy: A Journal of Research, Debate and Practice, Vol. 17 (2), 2021, 1-20.
