= Virginia Berasategui =

Spanish triathlete

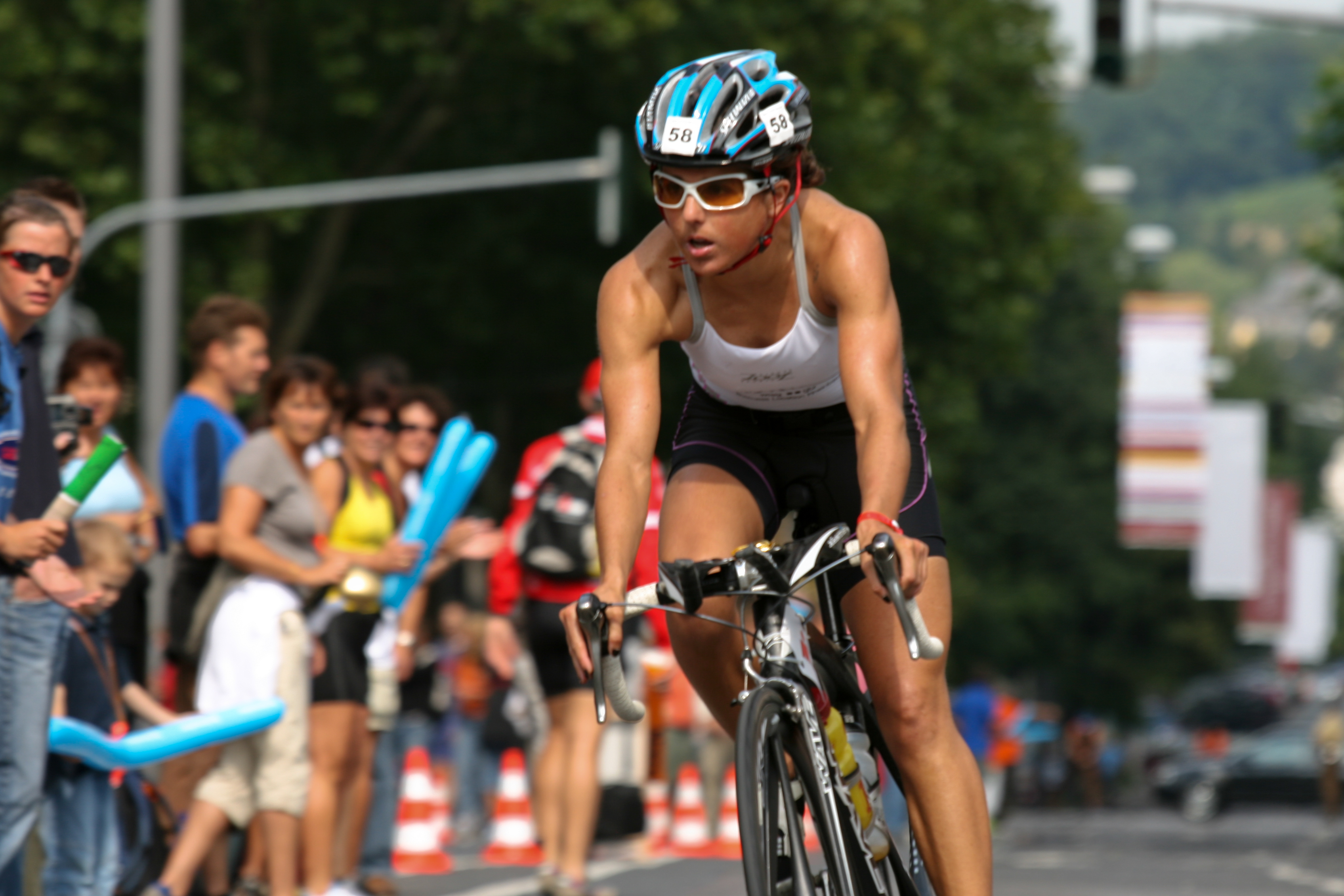

Personal information
- Born: 15 July 1975 (age 50) Bilbao, Biscay, Spain
- Height: 1.64 m (5 ft 4 1/2 in)
- Weight: 50 kg (110 lb)

Sport
- Country: Spain
Medal record
Representing Spain
Women's triathlon
Ironman Triathlon World Championships
Bronze medal – third place	2009 Kailua-Kona	Elite
ITU Long Distance World Championships
Bronze medal – third place	2010 Immenstadt	Elite
Bronze medal – third place	2002 Nice	Elite
Bronze medal – third place	1997 Nice	Elite
Women's duathlon
Bronze medal – third place	1997 Guernica	Elite

Virginia Berasategui Luna (born 15 July 1975 in Bilbao, Biscay) is a Spanish triathlete and duathlete who represented Spain in international competition. In 2009, Berasategui took third place at the Ironman World Championships. In March 2013, she announced that she would retire from the sport after the 2013 season. However two months later Berasategui tested positive after 'winning' the Bilbao Triathlon and later confessed to doping and retired.

== Career ==
Berasategui placed second at the 1997 Europe Triathlon Championships and won four medals at the ITU Long Distance Triathlon World Championships between 1997 and 2010. Additionally, she won two medals at the European Championship in 2009 and 2010, a medal at the 2009 Ironman World Championship and three medals at the Ironman 70.3 European Championship between 2007 and 2012.

In duathlon she took third at the 1997 ITU Duathlon World Championships.

=== Doping ===
In 2005, Berasategui tested positive for EPO following her win at Ironman Lanzarote. The allegations were eventually dropped because of doubts regarding the validity of the testing for EPO at the time. Berasategui claimed "extreme high protein levels in their urine after strenuous exercise" to be the reason for the false positive.

In June 2013, it was announced that Berasategui had tested positive for doping during the Bilbao Triathlon held on 18 May 2013, an event in which Berasategui won the half distance race. One of six anti-doping controls carried out after the Bilbao race had tested positive to which Berasategui asked for a counter-analysis on. However, almost two weeks later, Berasategui confessed to the doping charges. In a statement she said that she would not appeal because she knew that she was guilty and expressed the desire to be open and honest. She apologized and stated that she made "the worst mistake in which an athlete can fall."

== Notable results ==
Date	Position	Event	Total time
29 July 2012	4th	ITU Long Distance Triathlon World Championships, Vitoria-Gasteiz (4 km / 120 km / 30 km)	6:20:36
8 October 2011	10th	Ironman World Championships, Hawaii (Ironman distance)	9:19:52
9 October 2010	4th	Ironman World Championships, Hawaii (Ironman distance)	9:16:47
1 August 2010	3rd	ITU Long Distance Triathlon World Championships, Immenstadt, Germany (4 km / 130 km / 30 km)	7:13:19
26 June 2010	1st	ETU Long Distance Triathlon European Championships, Vitoria-Gasteiz, Spain (4 km / 120 km / 30 km)	6:14:46
1 May 2010	3rd	Wildflower Triathlon, Lake San Antonio, California (half-ironman distance)	4:39:46
10 October 2009	3rd	Ironman World Championships, Hawaii (Ironman distance)	9:15:28
8 August 2009	1st	ETU Long Distance Triathlon European Championships, Prague, Czech Republic (4 km / 120 km / 30 km)	6:13:05
2 May 2009	1st	Wildflower Triathlon, Lake San Antonio, California (half-ironman distance)	4:35:00
10 August 2008	1st	Ironman 70.3 Germany, Wiesbaden, Germany (half-Ironman distance)	4:43:38
10 August 2008	3rd	Monaco Ironman 70.3, Monaco (half-Ironman distance)	4:44:45
30 May 2005	1st	Ironman Lanzarote, Lanzarote, Spain (Ironman distance)	10:09:39
2 June 2004	1st	Ironman Lanzarote, Lanzarote, Spain (Ironman distance)	9:41:51
11 May 2003	1st	ETU Long Distance Triathlon European Championships, Ibiza, Spain (4 km / 120 km / 30 km)	6:19:20
14 September 1997	3rd	ITU Duathlon World Championships, Guernica, Spain	2:03:44
7 May 1997	2nd	ETU Triathlon European Championships, Vuokatti, Finland	2:13:48
