= Joanna Lawn =

New Zealand triathlete

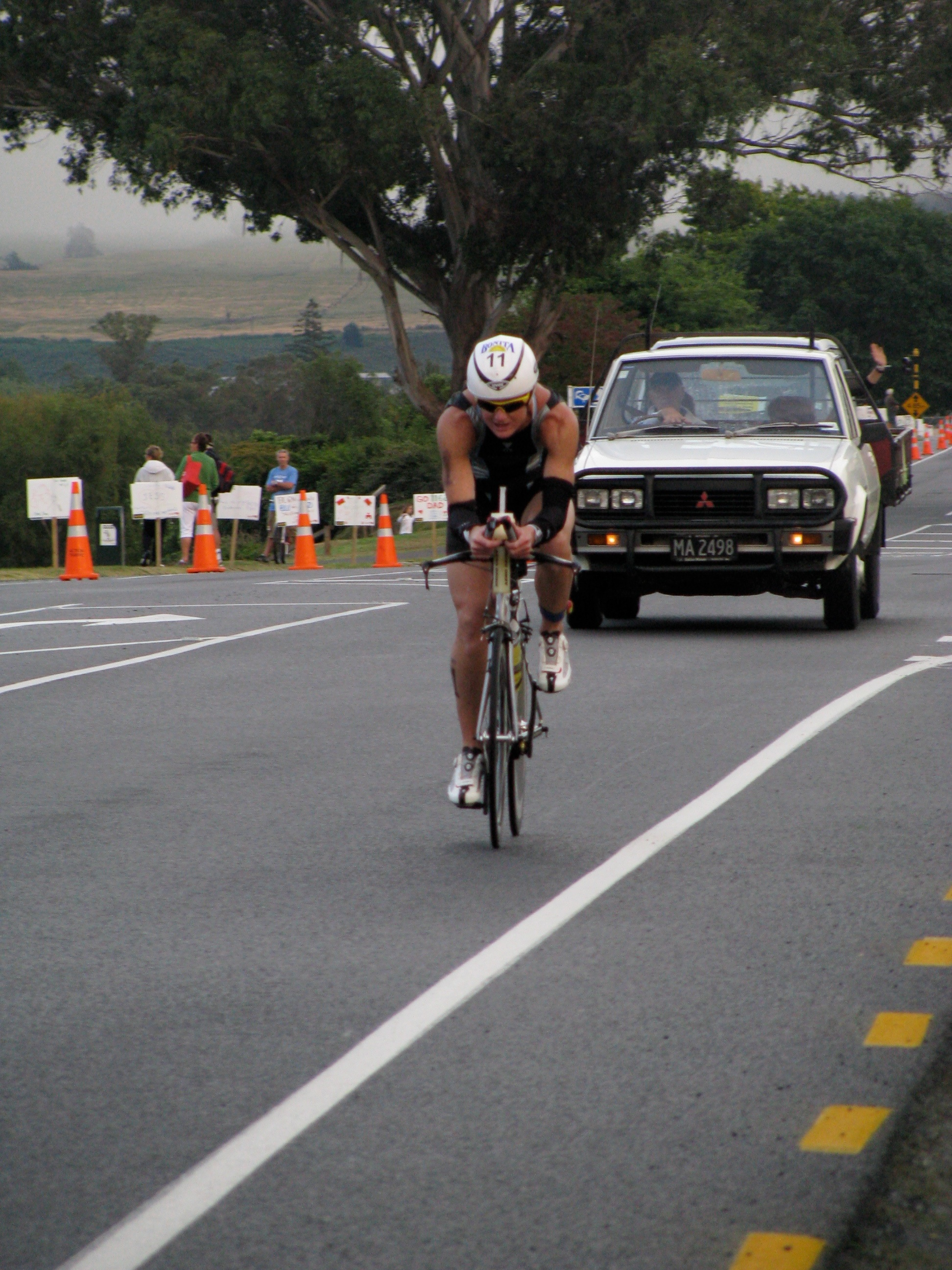
Lawn at Ironman New Zealand in 2009

Joanna Lawn (born 1973) is an ironman triathlete from New Zealand. She began in cycling before becoming a triathlete. She went on to win the Ironman New Zealand competition every year from 2003 to 2008 and again in 2010.

She competed at the 2009 Ironman World Championship.
