= Caroline Steffen =

Swiss triathlete

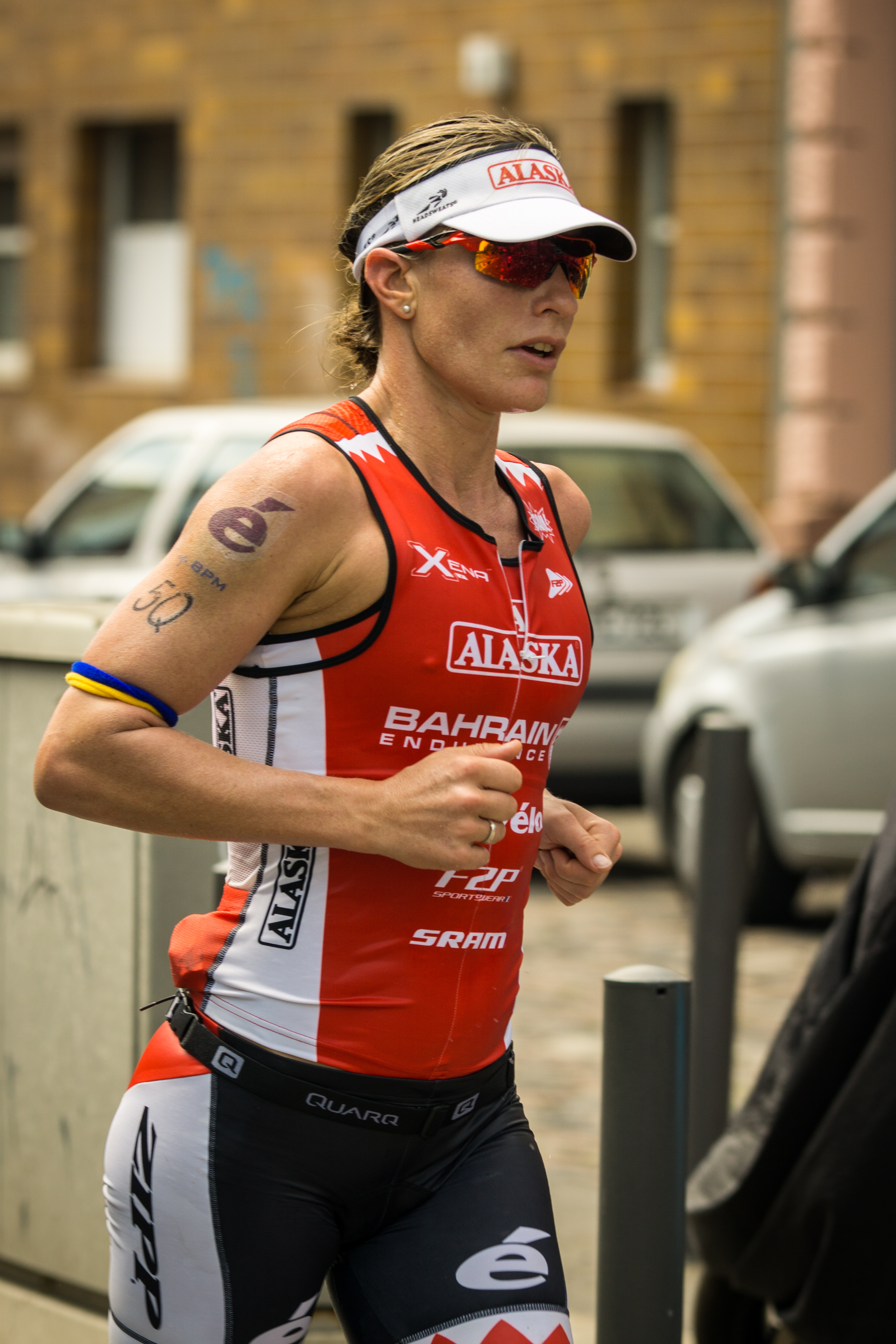
- Caroline Steffen competing in 2015 at Ironman Germany

Personal information
- Nickname: Xena
- Born: 18 September 1978 (age 47) Spiez, Switzerland
- Height: 1.78 m (5 ft 10 in)
- Weight: 68 kg (150 lb)

Sport
- Country: Switzerland
- Turned pro: 2009
- Coached by: Brett Sutton
Medal record
Representing Switzerland
Women's triathlon
ITU Long Distance World Championships
Gold medal – first place	2012	Individual
Gold medal – first place	2010	Individual
Silver medal – second place	2016	Individual
Ironman World Championship
Silver medal – second place	2010	Individual
Silver medal – second place	2012	Individual

Caroline Steffen (born 18 September 1978) is a professional triathlete from Switzerland. She is the winner of the 2010 and 2012 ITU Long Distance Triathlon World Championships and took second at the 2010 and 2012 Ironman World Championship. Before competing as a professional triathlete she was a member of the Lifeforce Pro Cycling Team.

== Career ==
Steffen was born in Spiez and began her early competitive career as a swimmer. She enjoyed success as a swimmer competing on the Swiss junior and senior national teams and winning multiple national titles. In 2002, Steffen underwent shoulder surgery and would eventually retire from competitive swimming afterwards. After taking some time off Steffen competed in a two-day Swiss multisport competition, the Gigathlon, which reignited her desire to compete and train again. In 2006, after having completed a few Olympic distance triathlons she entered and placed second in her age group at Ironman Switzerland, posting a sub-10 hour time. She went on to compete at the 2006 Ironman World Championships in Hawai'i where she posted another sub-10 hour time and place third in her age group as an amateur.

=== Cycling ===
Steffen moved on to concentrate on bicycle racing as she was not enjoying the swim training and felt that her running was a competitive weakness. Soon she was invited to join the Raleigh Lifeforce professional team alongside Nicole Cooke and Karin Thürig. After it was determined that she was too big to be a climber and not fast enough to be a sprinter, her role on the team was to set the sprinters up for the finish of races. As a professional cyclist she was showing improvement but the sport was not providing her with satisfaction. In May 2008, Steffen decided to leave the team and try her luck as a pro triathlete.

=== Triathlon ===
Soon after, Steffen was competing in Ironman competitions again. She moved to Australia and eventually quit her job to focus on triathlon training in Mooloolaba on the Sunshine Coast. Steffen began enjoying successes at the 70.3 and Ironman distances which caused her to gain the attention of coach Brett Sutton who eventually invited her to join team TBB and earning the nickname "Xena the Warrior Princess" or simply "Xena." In 2009, Steffen took fourth place the Ironman 70.3 World Championships in Clearwater, Florida. A few months later she won her first major race, the Ironman 70.3 in Geelong in February 2010. She highlighted 2010 with a win at the ITU Long Distance Triathlon World Championships and a second place at the Ironman World Championships. In October 2012, she placed 2nd in the 2012 Ironman World Championship at Kona, Hawaii being narrowly passed by eventual winner Leanda Cave approx. 3 miles from the finish line.

The next year, in 2013, Steffen would start off her season racing at Ironman 70.3 Auckland and Ironman Melbourne, where she would place 2nd and 3rd. By mid/late season she would capture 1st-place finishes at Challenge Roth and Ironman 70.3 Philippines before finishing 5th at the Ironman World Championship. In 2014 racing Steffen won Ironman Melbourne.
