= Chris Lieto =

American triathlete

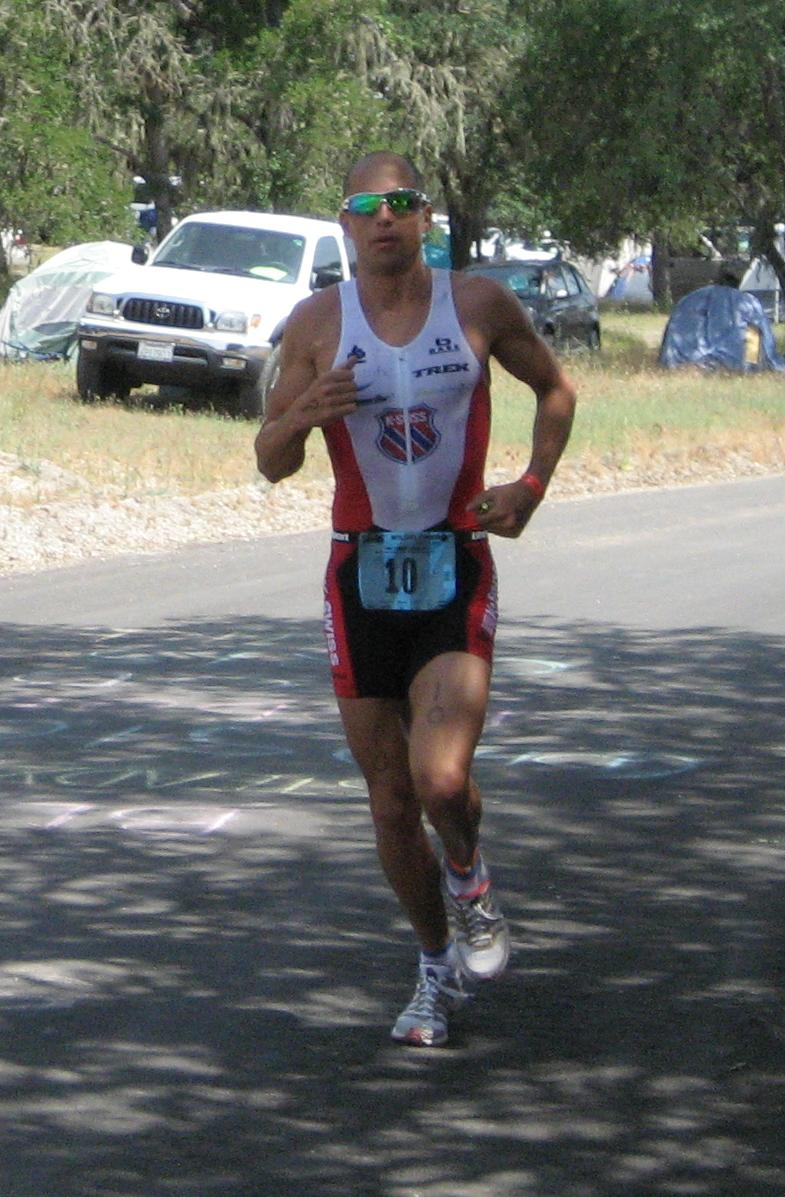
- Chris Lieto, Ironman World Championship

Personal information
- Born: February 7, 1972 (age 54) Red Bank, New Jersey, U.S.
- Height: 6 ft 0 in (1.83 m)
- Weight: 160 lb (73 kg)

Sport
- Country: United States
- Club: K-Swiss, Trek, Base Performance
- Turned pro: 2000

Achievements and titles
- Personal best: 8:22:56, 2009
Medal record
Men's Triathlon
Ironman Triathlon World Championships
Silver medal – second place	2009	Individual
Ironman 70.3 World Championships
Silver medal – second place	2011	Individual

Chris Lieto (born February 7, 1972, in Red Bank, New Jersey) is a professional triathlete and the winner of the 2006 Ironman Japan, 2005 Ironman Canada, and 2002 Ironman Wisconsin triathlons.

== Athletic career ==
Lieto grew up in Danville, California and later began his athletic career playing collegiate water polo at Long Beach State University. In 1997, he saw the Hawaii Ironman Triathlon World Championship on television and decided to participate in his first triathlon ever, which he won. Only three years later he became a professional triathlete. Just another three years after that, in 2003, he went on to place 13th at that same championship he saw on television which sparked his interest in the sport.

After a disappointing race career in 2005, Lieto chose to return to work as a mortgage broker while still continuing to train. Lieto said that returning to work "...helped me balance the time and focus I put into triathlon. I still focus on training, but without the endless thinking about the next race or the next training day. It allows me to be a little more relaxed in my preparation for a race." Since 2003, Lieto has steadily worked up his finishing place at the Ironman World Championship: 13th in 2003, 18th in 2005, 9th in 2006, 6th in 2007, 18th in 2008 and 2nd overall in 2009. He is the current bike course record holder for the 2005 Ironman Canada, with a time of 4:25:26. K-Swiss is Lieto's primary sponsor.

Lieto currently resides in Kailua-Kona, Hawaii with his wife Karis, son Kaiden, and daughter Kayah.

== Results ==
2009 Results
2nd Ironman World Championships, Kona Hawaii
2nd Nautica Malibu Triathlon Classic
1st San Jose International Pro Challenge (course record)
2nd Ironman Boise 70.3 (new bike course record)
2nd Ironman Hawaii Honu 70.3 new bike course record
2nd UVAS Triathlon
7th Wildflower 1/2 Ironman
3rd Miami International Triathlon New Bike Course record

2008 Results
3rd Miami International Triathlon (bike course record)
1st Nautica South Beach (course record)
3rd Wildflower 1/2 Ironman (new bike course record)
1st Columbia Triathlon (course record)
1st San Jose International (course record)
2nd Ironman 70.3 Boise (bike course record)
23rd Ironman World Championships Hawaii
2nd Ironman Arizona

Additional Results
1st Ironman Japan 2006 (new bike course record)
1st Ironman Canada 2005 (new bike course record)
1st Ironman Wisconsin 2002
1st Ironman 70.3 Vineman 2002
1st Nautica Malibu Triathlon 2003
1st San Jose International 2007
2nd Ironman USA Lake Placid 2003
2nd Ironman Malaysia 2006 (new bike course record)
2nd Ironman 70.3 Florida 2004
6th Ironman World Championship 2007
8th Ironman World Championship 70.3 2006 (2nd American)
9th Ironman World Championship 2006, Kona Hawaii (1st American)
13th Ironman World Championship 2003
18th Ironman World Championship 2005
3rd Kemah International Triathlon 2010 (new bike course record)
US National Ironman Champion 2003
Ranked 5th in the World 2003 by Inside Triathlon

Chris is now retired from professional triathlon.
