= Scott Neyedli =

Scottish triathlete

Scott Neyedli (born 16 June 1978) is a Scottish athlete from Aberdeen; he was a full-time professional Ironman triathlete (2007–2011), winning British and multiple Scottish Triathlon Championships.

He is a two-time Ironman Champion, winning Ironman UK in 2007 in a marathon and course record time and Ironman Wales in 2013 with the fastest bike and marathon run splits of the day. Neyedli won Ironman Wales whilst working full-time after resuming his oil and gas engineering career full-time at the start of 2012 due to sponsorship pitfalls. Neyedli has represented Great Britain at elite-level International Triathlon Union (ITU) championships, placing Top Briton and 9th place at the ITU World Long Distance Triathlon championships in 2011 along with Top Briton placings at the World Ironman Championships in Kona, Hawaii. Neyedli also won European Team Silver at the European Championships in 2007. Neyedli is still ranked one of the fastest British Ironman athletes and at the top of Great Britain's best medal tally at Ironman Competition (1st Ironman UK 2007, 2nd Ironman UK 2008, 2nd Ironman Western Australia 2009, 2nd Ironman Australia 2010, 1st Ironman Wales 2013) and still holding the current World Triathlon Corporation (WTC) Scottish Ironman record at 8 hours, 17 minutes, 47 seconds.
