= Maurizio Carta =

Italian urban planner and architect (born 1967)

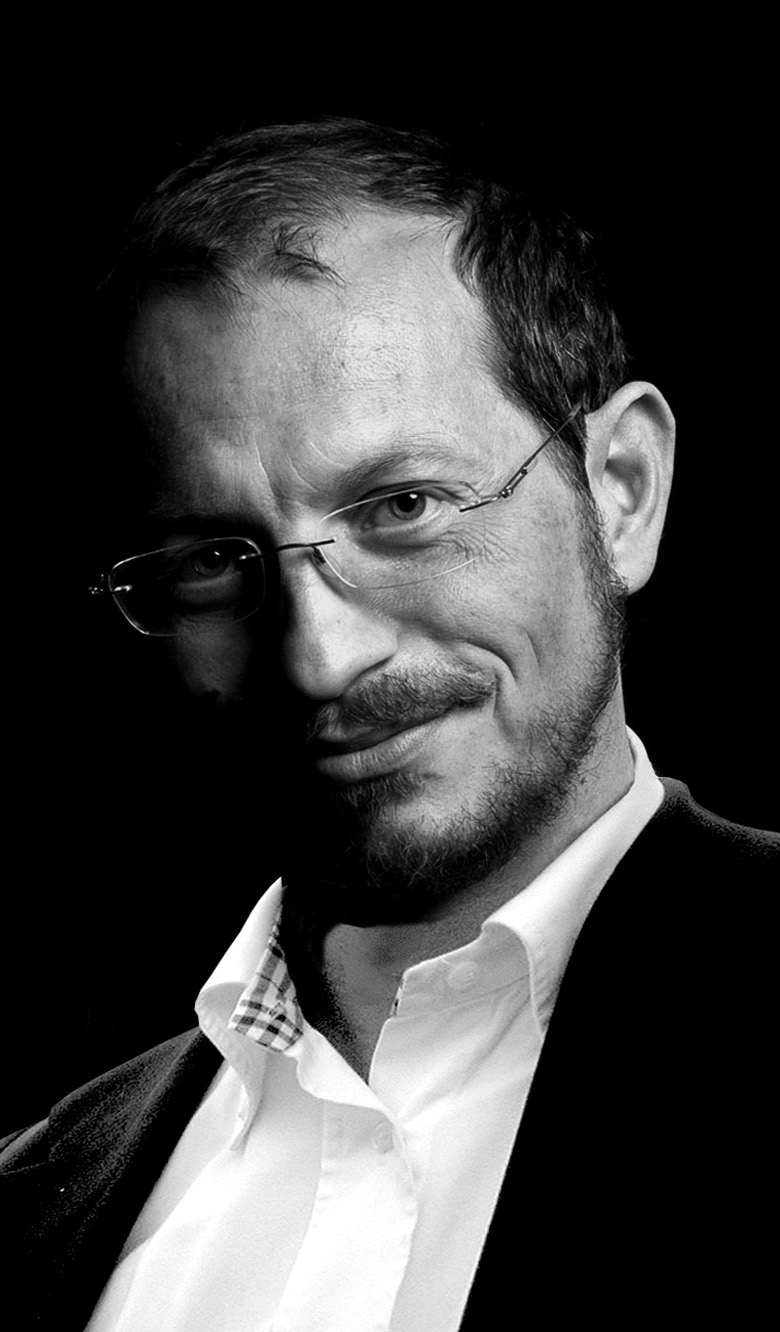
- Carta in 2014
- Born: 1967 (age 58–59); Palermo, Sicily, Italy
- Education: University of Palermo (PhD)
- Occupations: Urban planner; architect
- Years active: 1998–present

Maurizio Carta (born 1967) is an Italian urban planner and architect. He is full professor of urban and regional planning at the Department of Architecture at the University of Palermo, he teaches urban design and planning and he is the author of several scientific publications.

== Early life and education ==
Carta was born in 1967 in Palermo, Sicily.

He graduated in 1991 in Architecture with a specialization in Urbanism. In 1996 he obtained a PhD in urban and regional planning at the University of Palermo. In 1999 and 2000 he was Visiting Scholar at the Columbia University of New York, under the scientific lead of Peter Marcuse.

== Career ==
In 1998 he was among the founders of the Bachelor and Master Degree in "Urbanism and Regional and Landscape Planning" of the University of Palermo, which was inspired by the holistic urban planning vision of Adriano Olivetti and Giovanni Astengo. From November 2015 he is the president of the Polytechnic School of the University of Palermo. He is the director and the scientific responsible of the “Smart Planning Lab”, an applied research lab in advanced planning for smart cities and social innovation. From 2013 to October 2015 he was the coordinator of the B.Sc in "Urbanism, regional and landscape planning" and of the M.Sc in "Urban and Regional Planning". He is senior expert on strategic planning, urbanism, urban regeneration and local development and he was the author of several urban, landscape and strategic plans in Sicily and in Southern Italy. He is member of Italian Society of Urbanism (SIU) Steering Committee, member of Italian Institute of Urbanism (INU) Steering Committee and member of Urban Academy (AU) Steering Committee. He is member of the Scientific Committee of the international review TRIA. Rivista internazionale di cultura urbanistica (Università Degli Studi Di Napoli Federico II). He is member of the Editorial Board of the international review Monograph.it (ListLab Laboratorio Internazionale di Strategie Editoriali, Trento-Barcelona). He is member of the Editorial Board of the international review EWT/ EcoWebTown (ISSN 2039-2656). He is member of the Scientific Committee of the international review Portus Plus Six-monthly online review of RETE.

He is the author of the "Cityforming Protocol", an innovative protocol for urban regeneration able to reactivate by stages the stationary metabolism of a declining urban area, starting from its latent regenerative components, enabling multiple cycles, increasing intensity to create a new urban sustainable ecosystem over time. The Cityforming acts for incremental and adaptive steps required to produce partial results that become the foundation of the next generative phase. The Cityforming, progressing through the stages of colonisation, consolidation and development, produces the necessary “urban oxygen" for the formation of an appropriate ecosystem able to generate a new active metabolism that reactivates inactive cycles, reconnects the broken ones or that activates new ones, more adapted to the new identity of transition places.

In 2015 the International Biennial of Architecture in Buenos Aires awarded him with the prize for “academic investigation”. In 2016 and 2017 he won the World's Best Smart City Urban Planners Award promoted by CITYOS Foundation.

In 2018 he is part of the curatorial team of the Italian Pavilion "Arcipelago Italia" curated by Mario Cucinella for the 16th Venice Biennale of Architecture and dedicated to the internal areas of the country. He is also part of the project team for the preparation of the strategic project for Belice and Gibellina within the same pavilion. In 2018, together with Ippolito Pestellini Laparelli, OMA's partner, he curated the Manifesta 12 Studios exhibition in the context of Manifesta 12, the nomadic Biennale of contemporary art held in Palermo. Over two semesters, four international laboratories from four major schools of architecture (Architectural Association and Royal College of Art in London, the Dutch TU Delft and the University of Palermo) have investigated, studied and outlined future scenarios for the city of Palermo.

In 2018 he participated in the TEDx Rimini with a talks entitled "Augmented City: the paradigm of innovation for the cities of the future" dedicated to the new paradigm of augmented cities to inhabit the Neoanthropocene.

In 2019 he was Italian Design Ambassador for the Italian Foreign Affairs Ministry, invited to lecture in São Paulo and Porto Alegre (Brasil).

In 2020 he is part of the curatorial team of the Italian Pavilion "Resilient Communities" curated by Alessandro Melis for the 17th Venice Biennale of Architecture (postponed to 2021 due to Covid-19).

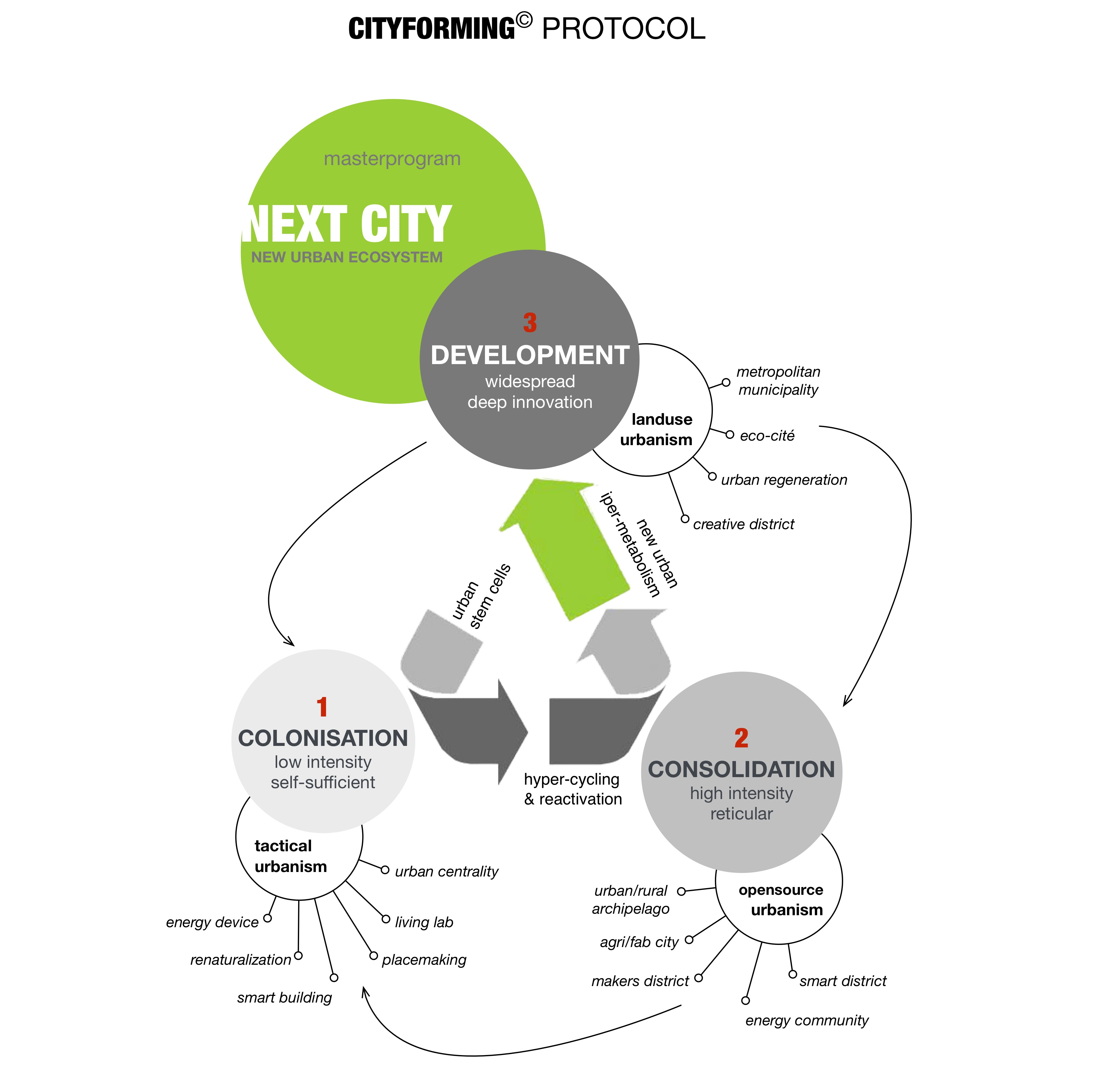

=== Publications ===
With the book L’armatura culturale del territorio (1999) he inaugurated the Italian line of urban studies about the conservation and valorization of cultural heritage in the frame of European mainstream about city planning fueled by cultural identity, considered both as identity’s matrix tools and sustainable local development. His studies about the territorial cultural armature have produced some applied researches aimed at identifying qualitative and quantitative parameters for the formation of local cultural systems, in western Sicily and in other parts of Italy.

Carta is the Italian theorist of the "creative city", on which he published the book Creative City. Dynamics, Innovations, Actions (Trento, ListLab, 2007) in which it is proposed a manifesto for the "second generation" creative cities, based on 3C: Culture, Communication and Cooperation. The scenario of the global crisis has led to the identification of a third-generation and elaboration of the paradigm of the "creative city 3.0 beta version", capable of generating new city and new cycles of life more creative, open-minded, brilliant, intelligent and sustainable eco-system, able to act as a driver of new urban policies to overcome our inner crisis.

On the themes of the waterfront regeneration he has developed some innovative methods and urban design experiments originally defined by Rosario Pavia and Rinio Bruttomesso, which began in 2005 and synthesized in 2013 in the "fluid city paradigm", proposed as part of a project of international cooperation between Sicily and Malta, and applied in the masterplan for the regeneration of Palermo waterfront.

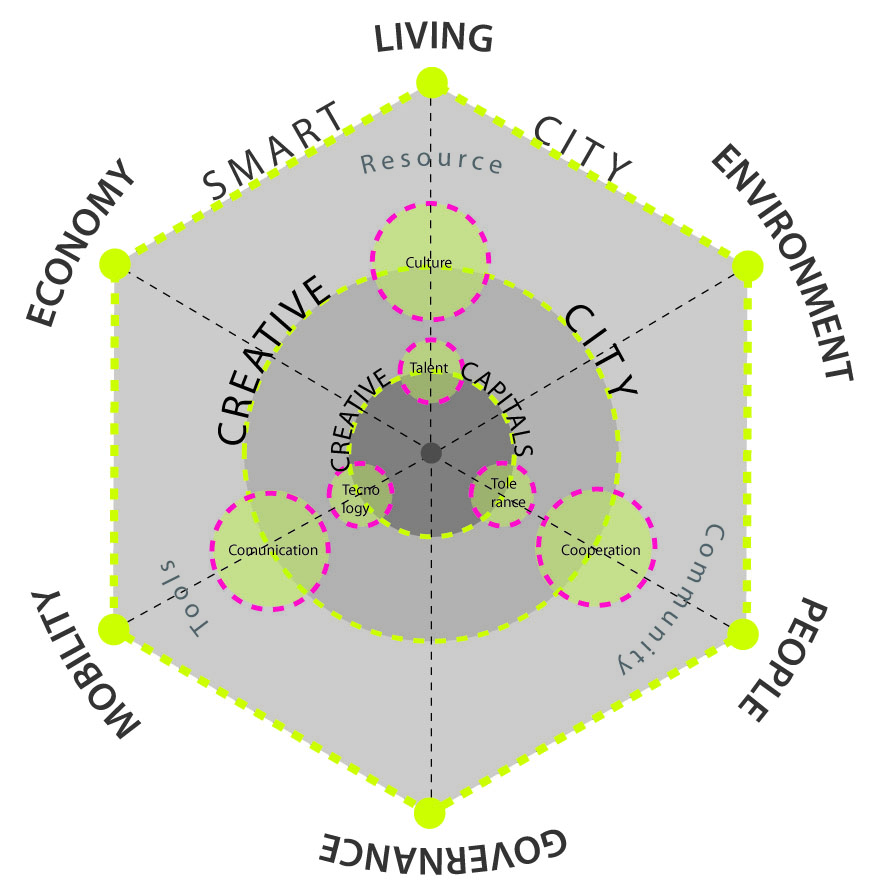
Relationships between creative capitals, creative city and urban smartness

With the book Reimagining Urbanism (Trento, ListLab, 2014) he has investigated and interpreted the challenges of western cities - and Sicilian one - in the age of never-ending metamorphosis not only as a powerful attractor of population, but also as a responsible subject of a new relationship with the suburban and rural areas, as activators of beautiful creative eco-systems based on new digital/physical citymakers. The book proposes an urbanism capable of producing resources for a new urban metabolism that can be reconciled with environmental protection, with the reduction of consumption, with the consolidation of the welfare state, food creation, as well as the promotion of innovative startups can stimulate the intelligence and creativity, to extend urban agriculture and recycling, to manage energy adaptation and climate efficiency of the city of the future.

With the new book Augmented City. A Paradigm Shift (Trento-Barcelona, ListLab, 2017) he proposes a new paradigm for more sensible, open source, intelligent, creative and resilient cities, based on recycle for being more productive, fluid and reticular. The incoming paradigm is based on ten challenges/approaches that need a strategic urban planning more incremental and adaptive, based on a new protocol called "Cityforming".

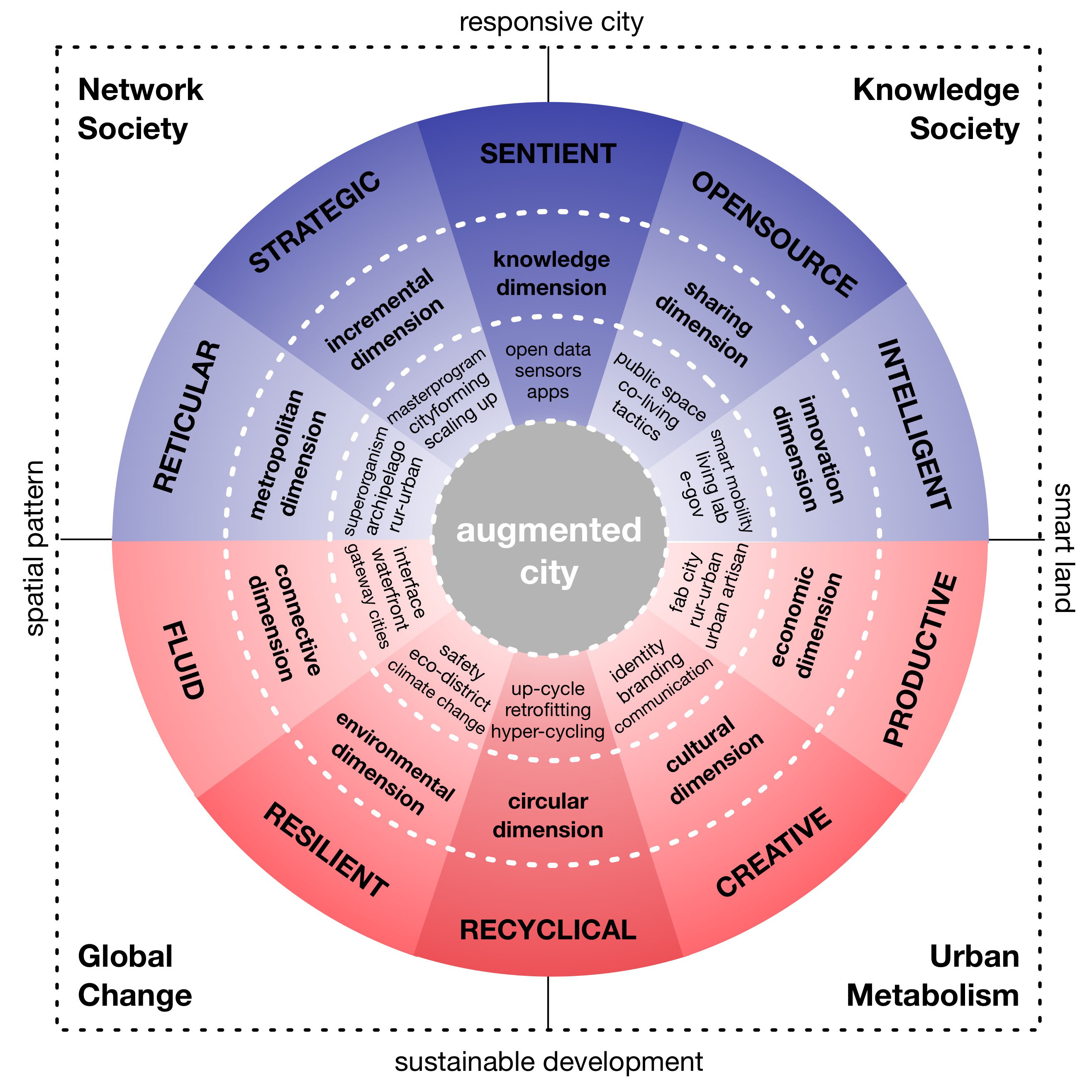
The Augmented City Circle: ten challenges/approaches for answering the main four revolutions

== Main Publications ==
- L'armatura culturale del territorio. Il patrimonio culturale come matrice di identità e strumento di sviluppo. Milano: FrancoAngeli, 1999. ISBN 88-464-1140-4.
- Next City: culture city. Roma: Meltemi, 2004. ISBN 88-8353-303-8.
- Creative City. Dynamics, Innovations, Actions. Trento-Barcellona: List, 2007. ISBN 978-88-95623-03-0.
- “Culture, communication and cooperation: the three Cs for a proactive creative city”, in International Journal of Sustainable Development, Vol. 12, No.2/3/4, 2009.
- “Creative City 3.0. New scenarios and projects”, in Monograph.it, n.1, 2009.
- “Creative Cities in Italy: new scenarios and projects”, in Journal of Urban Planning International, n. 3, 2012.
- "The Fluid City Paradigm", in Waterfront Atlas. Visions, paradigms, policy and projects for the Sicilian and Maltese waterfronts. Palermo, 2013. ISBN 9788890484919.
- Reimagining Urbanism. Creative, Smart and Green Cities for the Changing Times. Trento-Barcelona: List Lab, 2014. ISBN 9788898774197.
- "Smart Planning and Intelligent Cities: A New Cambrian Explosion", in E. Riva Sanseverino et al. (eds.), Smart Rules for Smart Cities, Springer, 2014. ISBN 978-3-319-06421-5
- "Urban Hyper-Metabolism", con B. Lino, Roma, Aracne, 2015. ISBN 978-88-548-8654-4
- "Smart Planning for Intelligent Cities: the Open Source Paradigm", Barcelona, Iaac bits, 3.2.3, 2015. ISSN 2339-8647
- "The Fluid City Paradigm. Waterfront Regeneration as an Urban Renewal Strategy", con D. Ronsivalle, Zurich, Springer, 2016. ISBN 978-3-319-28003-5
- "Augmented City. A Paradigm Shift", Trento-Barcelona, ListLab, 2017. ISBN 9788899854201
- "Territories. Rural-Urban Strategies", with J. Schröder, M. Ferretti, B. Lino, Berlin, Jovis, 2017.
- "Dynamics of Periphery. Atlas of Emerging Creative Resilient Habitats", with J. Schroeder, M. Ferretti, B. Lino, Berlin, Jovis, 2018.
- Futuro. Politiche per un diverso presente, Rubbettino, 2019.
- "Augmented Cities in Post-pandemic Cities", in Domus Greater China, Special Issue Digital Community, october, 2020.
- “Neoanthropocene Raising and Protection of Natural and Cultural Heritage: A Case Study in Southern Italy”, con D. Ronsivalle in Sustainability, 12, 4286, 2020.
- "Inner Archipelagos in Sicily. From Culture-Based Development to Creativity-Oriented Evolution", con D. Ronsivalle, B. Lino, in Sustainability, 2020, 12(18), 7452.
- ”Palermo. Biografia progettuale di una città aumentata”, LetteraVentidue, 2021.
- ”Città aumentate. Dieci gesti-barriera per il futuro”, Il Margine, 2021.
- ”Homo urbanus. Città e comunità in evoluzione”, Donzelli, 2022.
