= Corinne Abraham =

British triathlete (born 1977)

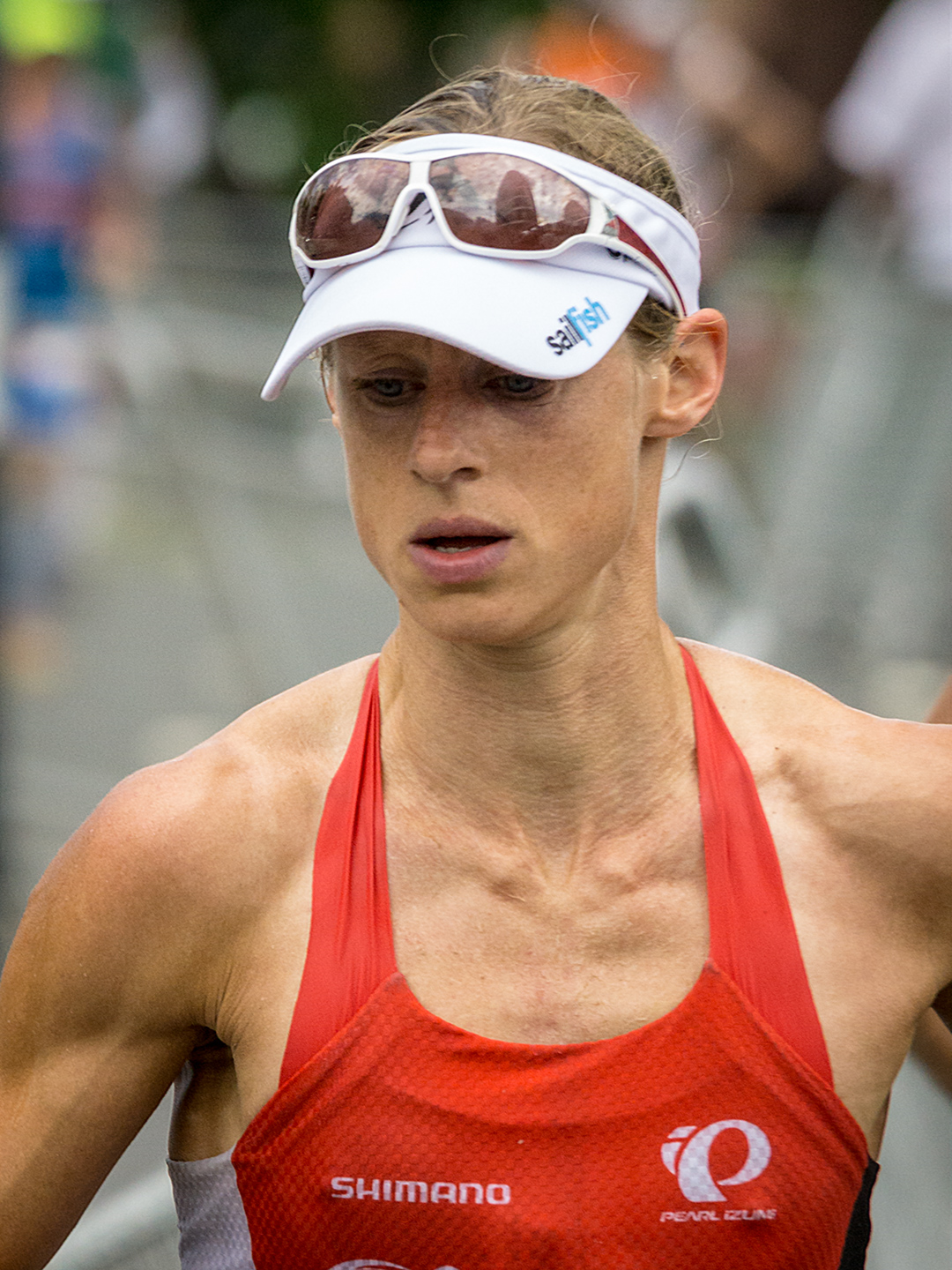
- Abraham at the 2014 Ironman European Championship in Frankfurt

Personal information
- Citizenship: United Kingdom
- Born: 1977 (age 48–49)
- Years active: 2010–2019
- Height: 1.71 m (5 ft 7 in)
- Weight: 56 kg (123 lb)

Sport
- Country: Great Britain
- Sport: Triathlon
- Turned pro: 2011

Corinne Abraham (born 1977) is a British triathlete who competes internationally for Great Britain. She primarily competes in Ironman events, and has won six.

Before competing in Ironman events, Abraham played volleyball. She also ran the London Marathon twice. Abraham's first Ironman event was in Regensburg in 2010, placing third. After that, she decided to become a professional triathlete.

Abraham has had multiple injuries which have hindered her ability to participate in Ironman events. After her first triathlon, she suffered a back injury which was later diagnosed as a prolapsed disc, rendering her unable to complete in two events. In 2013, Abraham was planning to take part in the Ironman World Championship, held in Kona, Hawaii, however she had to pull out due to a broken sacrum. The next year she was able to return to running and compete in the world championship for the first time.

Abraham has won six Ironman competitions between 2013 and 2019, including the 2014 Ironman European Championship in Frankfurt. She has not competed since 2019.
