= Torsten Abel =

German-American triathlete

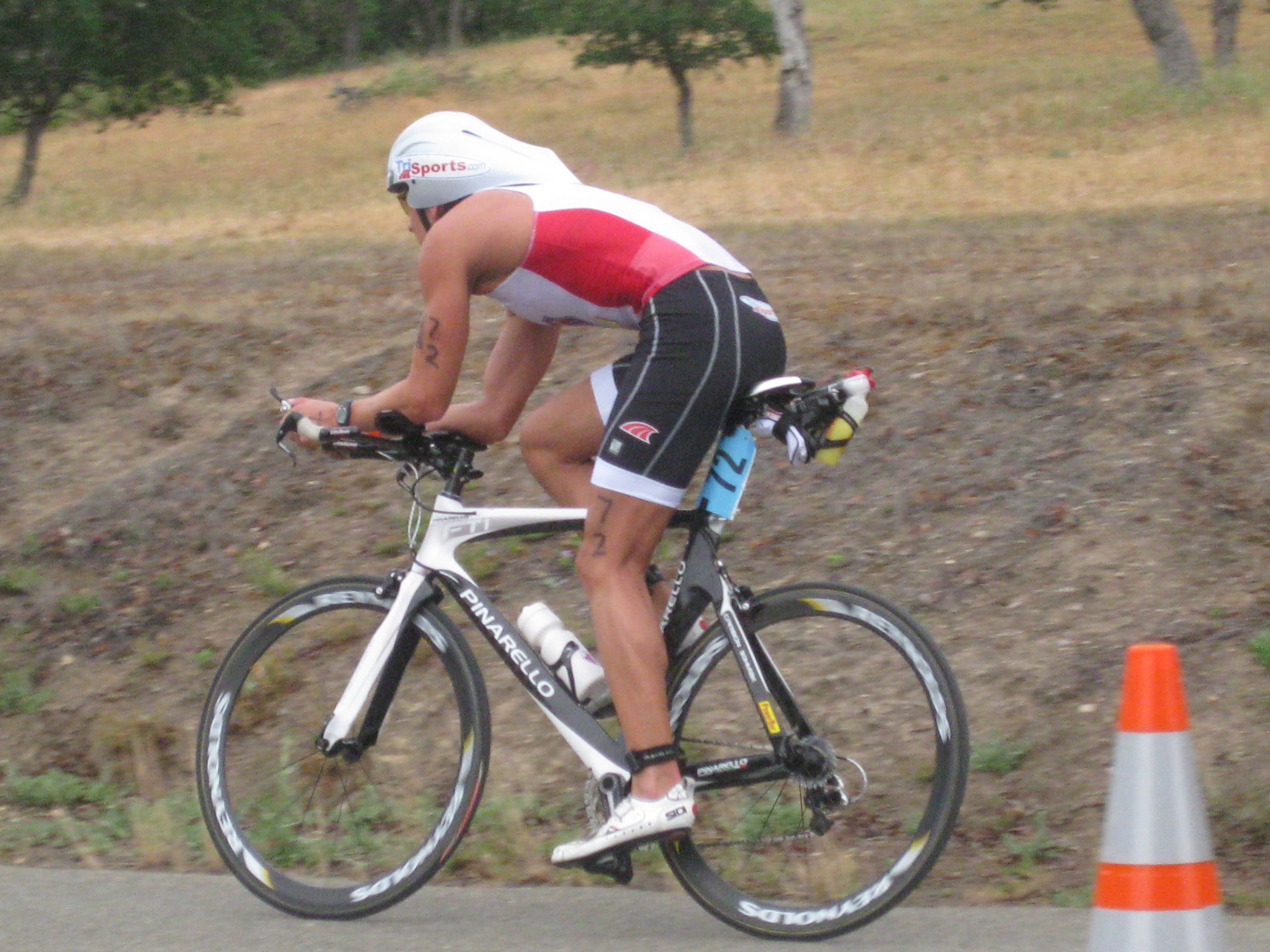
- Torsten Abel at the 2009 Wildflower Triathlon in Lake San Antonio, California

Personal information
- Nickname: T-Rex
- Born: 2 January 1974 (age 52) West Berlin

Sport
- Country: United States
- Sport: Triathlon
- Club: German Junior Team
- Retired: yes
Medal record
Men's triathlon
Representing Germany
Ironman Canada
Silver medal – second place	2011	Individual

Torsten Abel (born 2 January 1974 in West Berlin) is a former German triathlete who later competed for the United States.

== Athletic career ==
=== Triathlon since 1991 ===
Abel was born in Charlottenburg, Berlin, grew up in Weiler-Simmerberg and contested his first triathlon in 1991. From 1992 to 1997 he started in the Bayern squad and from 1994 for the German junior team. Abel competed for Germany in several ITU Triathlon World Cup races from 2000 to 2002 and finished fifth in the European Triathlon Cup rankings in 2001.

In 2005 he started for the first time in the long-distance triathlon (3.86 kilometres (2.40 mi) swimming, 180.2 kilometres (112.0 mi) cycling and 42.195 kilometres (26.219 mi) running) in Roth, Bavaria. Since 2006 he has also worked as a coach and trainer.

== Personal ==
Abel was married to triathlete Leanda Cave, whom he met at a triathlon in Portugal in 1999 and coached for several years. They married in summer 2010 and moved to Tucson, Arizona. The couple were separated as of February 2013. He lives in San Francisco.
