= Gina Crawford =

New Zealand triathlete

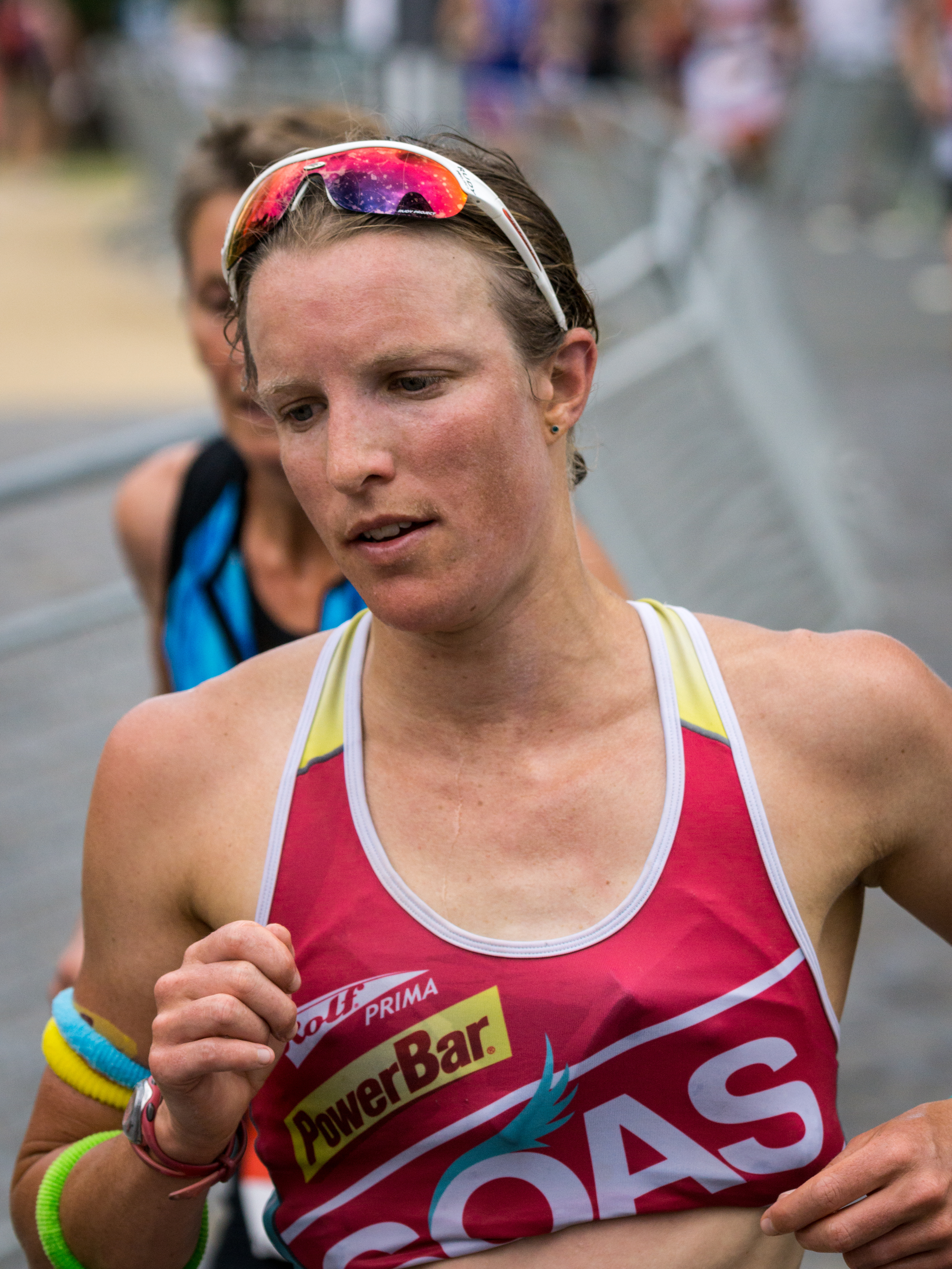
Gina Crawford competing in 2014 at Ironman Germany

Gina Crawford is a former professional triathlete from New Zealand. She competes in World Triathlon Corporation (WTC) Ironman and Ironman 70.3 triathlons. An Ironman triathlon consists of a 2.4 mi (3.8 km) swim, 112 mi (180.2 km) bike and a 26.2 mi (42.2 km) run. An Ironman 70.3 triathlon consists of a 1.2 mi (1.9 km) swim, 56 mi (90.1 km) bike and a 13.1 mi (21.1 km) run.

Crawford's time of 9:08:23 at Ironman Western Australia 2007 was the 11th fastest women's time in the world in the WTC Ironman 2008 series where 6,223 women finished. (286 Professional + 5,937 Amateurs)

== Results ==
Series	Race	Overall Position	Gender Position	Category Position	Category	Time	Qualified
Challenge	Challenge Wanaka Half 2018						
Challenge	Challenge Wanaka 2015		1	1			
Challenge	Challenge Wanaka 2014		2	2			
Challenge	Challenge Wanaka 2013		1	1			
Challenge Henley 2012	Challenge Henley 2012	11	1	1	F PRO	9:08:05	
Challenge	Challenge Wanaka 2012		1	1			
Challenge	Challenge Wanaka 2010		1	1			
Challenge	Challenge Wanaka 2009		1	1			
WTC Ironman 2009	Western Australia 2008	22	1	1	F PRO	8:59:24	
WTC Ironman 2008	World Championship 2008	126	8	8	F PRO	9:36:53	World Championship 2009
WTC Ironman 2008	New Zealand 2008	44	5	5	F PRO	9:33:29	
Challenge	Challenge Wanaka 2008		1	1			
WTC Ironman 2008	Western Australia 2007	40	2	2	F PRO	9:08:23	
WTC Ironman 2008	Wisconsin 2007	17	1	1	F PRO	9:37:03	World Championship 2008
WTC Ironman 70.3 2008	70.3 Singapore 2008	18	2	2	F PRO	4:29:46	
