= Eneko Llanos =

Spanish triathlete

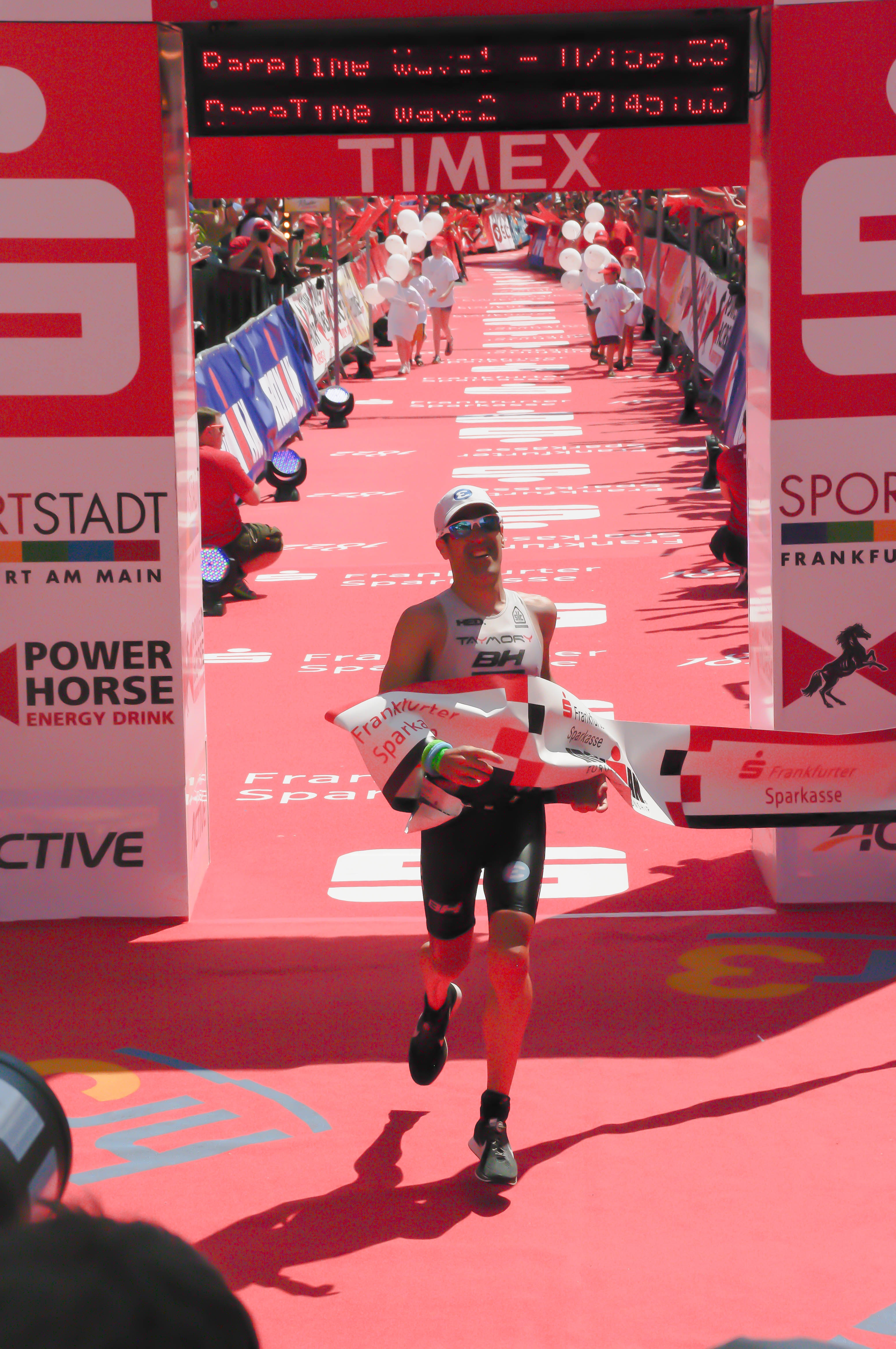
- Eneko Llanos 2013 Ironman triathlon in Frankfurt, Germany

Medal record

Men's triathlon

Representing Spain

ITU Long Distance World Championships
Gold medal – first place	2003 Ibiza	Elite

Ironman World Championships
Silver medal – second place	2008	Elite

XTERRA World Championships
Gold medal – first place	2003	Elite
Gold medal – first place	2004	Elite
Gold medal – first place	2009	Elite

Eneko Llanos Burguera (born 30 November 1976 in Vitoria-Gasteiz, Alava) is a Spanish triathlete.

Llanos competed at the first Olympic triathlon at the 2000 Summer Olympics. He took twenty-third place with a total time of 1:50:48.35. Four years later, at the 2004 Summer Olympics, Llanos competed again, moving up in the ranking to twentieth place. His time on the more difficult Athens course was 1:54:52.37.

He has also been a top-10 finisher at Hawaii Ironman on three occasions. In 2008 Eneko became a recognized competitor for the Ironman Hawaii crown. After a fierce duel with Chris Mccormack in Wildflower, where he finished 19 seconds behind Mccormack, and when the scenario repeated itself in Frankfurt, it was clear that Eneko was a serious contender. He was then mentioned on many occasions as one of the pre-favourites, with Mccormack, Craig Alexander and Normann Stadler.

Again it was a 2nd place, and again it was to a time difference of 3 minutes and 5 seconds.

He is vegetarian.

He was champion of the first Abu Dhabi International Triathlon.
