= Marino Vanhoenacker =

Belgian triathlete

Medal record

Representing Belgium

Men's triathlon

ITU World Championships
Silver medal – second place	2005	Individual
Bronze medal – third place	2004	Individual
Bronze medal – third place	2006	Individual

Ironman World Championship
Bronze medal – third place	2010	Individual

Men's duathlon

Duathlon World Championships
Bronze medal – third place	2000	Individual

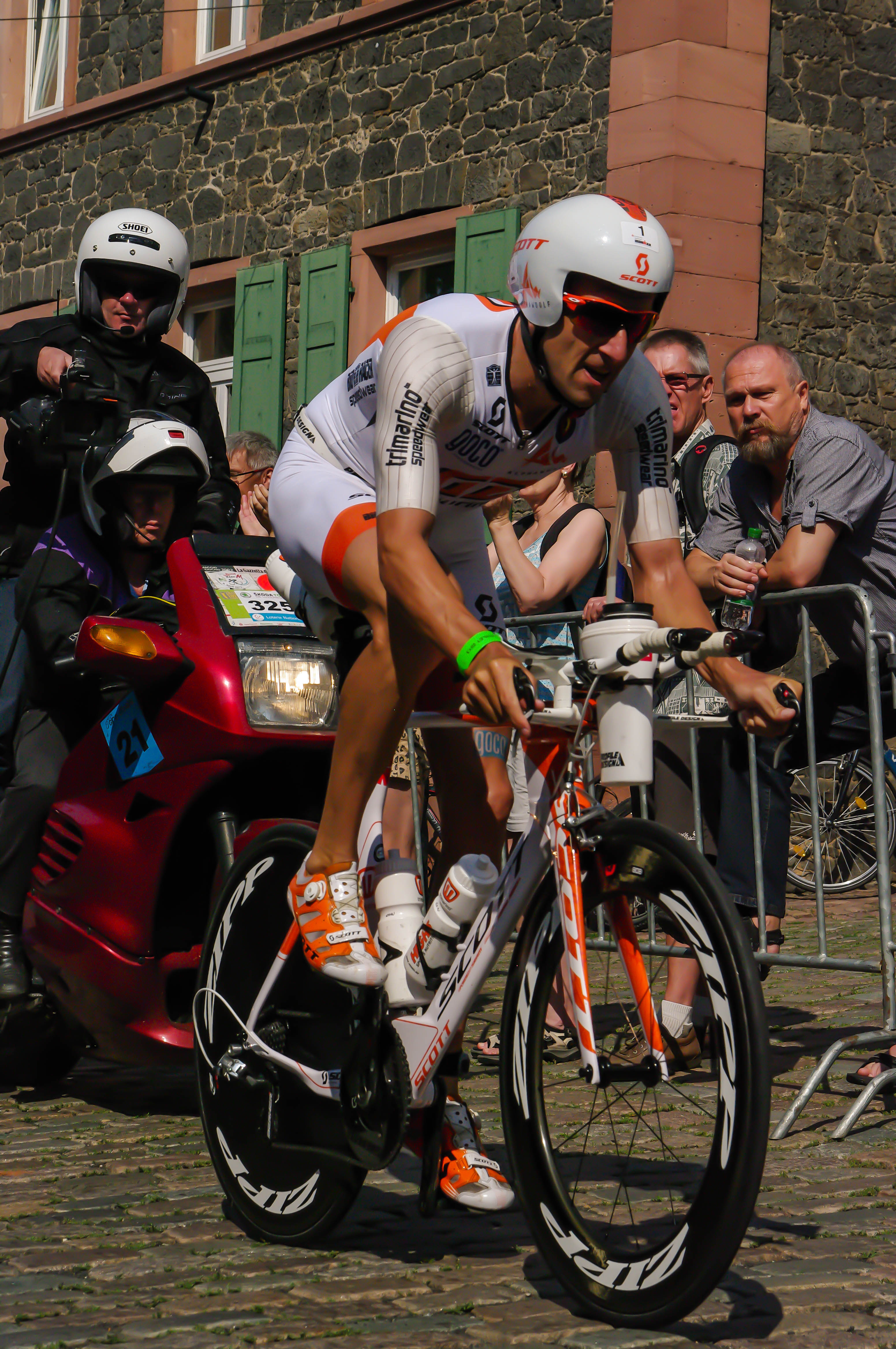
Marino Vanhoenacker in Ironman Germany 2013

Marino Vanhoenacker (born 19 July 1976 in Ostend) is a Belgian triathlete. On 3 July 2011, he set a world best time for Ironman full distance triathlon at the Ironman Triathlon at Klagenfurt in Austria, finishing after 7 hours, 45 minutes and 58 seconds, beating Luc Van Lierde's 1997 time of 7h50m27s. His time was subsequently beaten by Lionel Sanders at Ironman Arizona in 2016; the current world best time is held by Tim Don in a time of 7 hours, 40 minutes and 23 seconds at Ironman Brazil in May 2017.

.

== Biography ==
Marino Vanhoenacker was born in Ostend in 1976. He studied as a dietician. He started competing in duathlons and triathlons in 1997, and has since won 9 Ironman Triathlons. His first success was his fifth place in the 2001 Iron Man of Florida, and the first medal followed in the 2003 Malaysia Iron Man. The first victory followed in 2005, with the Ironman of Florida.

His best results, Vanhoenacker achieved in Ironman Austria in Klagenfurt, which he has won 6 times, beating the world record by compatriot Luc Van Lierde in 2011 by over four minutes. His split times were 46 minutes 49 seconds for the swim, 4 hours 15 minutes 37 seconds for the 180 km bike race, and 2 hours 39 minutes 24 seconds for the marathon.

Vanhoenacker used to work as a personal trainer and now works for the Belgian Army, where he has a special athlete's exemption. He now lives at Jabbeke, and has a daughter with his girlfriend, Elke: Jirte, born in 2003.

== Results ==
- 2000: bronze medal at the world championships duathlon
- 2001: Fifth at Ironman Florida
- 2003: Third place at Ironman Malaysia
- 2004: bronze medal at the ITU Long Distance Triathlon World Championships
- 2005: silver medal at the ITU Long Distance Triathlon World Championships, winner of Ironman Florida
- 2006: bronze medal at the ITU Long Distance Triathlon World Championships, winner of Ironman Austria, sixth at Ironman Hawaii
- 2007: winner of Ironman Austria, fifth in Hawaii, winner of the half Ironman (70.3) Antwerp
- 2008: winner of Ironman Austria, second in the half triathlon of St. Croix, winner of the half Ironman (70.3) Antwerp
- 2009: winner of Ironman South Africa and Ironman Austria, winner of the half Ironman (70.3) Antwerp
- 2010: bronze medal at the 2010 Ironman World Championship in Hawaii, winner of the Ironman Malaysia and Ironman Austria
- 2011: winner of Ironman Austria in the then world best time of 7 hours, 45 minutes and 58 seconds
- 2012: winner of Ironman Frankfurt (European Championship)
- 2014: winner of Ironman Canada (Whistler) with a time of 8:16:10
- 2015: winner of Ironman Brazil with a time of 7:53:44
- 2016: winner of Ironman Chattanooga with a time of 8:12:22
- 2017: winner of Ironman Mont-Tremblant with a time of 8:21:29
- 2018: winner of IronMan Australia with a time of 8:14:37
