= 2001 ITU Long Distance Triathlon World Championships =

International sports competition

World Long Distance Triathlon Championships
- Location: Fredericia, Denmark
- Date: April 5 2001

Champions
- Men: Peter Sandvang (Denmark)
- Women: Lisbeth Kristensen (Denmark)

The 2001 ITU Long Distance Triathlon World Championships was a triathlon competition held in Fredericia in Denmark on April 5 2001 and organized by the International Triathlon Union, now World Triathlon. This was the ninth edition of the competition.

The Elite races for men and women consisted of a 3.8 km (2.4 mi) swim, 180 km (110 mi) bike and 42 km (26 mi) run, matching the iconic distance of the Ironman Triathlon event for the first time, and longer than the standard 1.5 km swim, 40 km bike and 10 km run associated with the World Triathlon Championship Series and the Olympic Games. The Elite team event introduced in the previous year was not continued.

The event was a notable success for Scandinavian athletes, and particularly those of the home nation, with a third successive title for Peter Sandvang, a women's title for Lisbeth Kristensen, both Danes, and two minor medals each for Denmark and Sweden.

In addition to the elite championships, a series of amateur age-group championships was also held on the preceding day.

== Medal Summary ==
Event	Gold		Silver		Bronze	
Men	Peter Sandvang; Denmark	8:24:17	Rasmus Henning; Denmark	8:25:45	Jonas Colting; Sweden	8:26:32
Women	Lisbeth Kristensen; Denmark	9:27:17	Lena Wahlqvist; Sweden	9:29:32	Suzanne Nielsen; Denmark	9:46:02

== Results ==
The following are the results of the elite races:

=== Men ===
The field of 37 was led home by back-to-back defending champion Peter Sandvang.

Rank	Athlete	Nation	Swim	T1	Bike	T2	Run	Overall time
1st place, gold medalist(s)	Peter Sandvang	Denmark	50:01	1:30	4:33:28	2:33	2:56:41	8:24:17
2nd place, silver medalist(s)	Rasmus Henning	Denmark	48:04	1:20	4:40:06	1:34	2:54:41	8:25:45
3rd place, bronze medalist(s)	Jonas Colting	Sweden	50:04	1:33	4:44:28	1:11	2:49:16	8:26:32
4	Dirk Van Gossum	Belgium	53:33	1:35	4:44:53	0:58	2:47:58	8:28:59
5	Torbjorn Sindballe	Denmark	49:56	1:30	4:40:28	1:10	2:57:30	8:30:35
6	Mika Luoto	Finland	51:39	1:30	4:45:03	1:01	2:51:51	8:31:04
7	Tero Hyppoelae	Finland	51:30	1:30	4:44:24	1:25	2:53:56	8:32:45
8	Marc Herremans	Belgium	53:28	1:31	4:42:31	2:01	2:54:31	8:34:06
9	Xavier Le Floch	France	51:35	1:41	4:51:46	1:33	2:49:56	8:36:33
10	Frank Heldoorn	Netherlands	51:42	1:58	4:43:39	1:10	3:02:14	8:40:44
11	Gilles Reboul	France	51:33	1:45	4:41:59	3:09	3:04:02	8:42:29
12	Patrick Vernay	France	49:58	1:57	4:46:14	1:46	3:04:25	8:44:22
13	Alex Pedersen	Denmark	59:16	1:49	4:43:49	1:34	3:01:25	8:47:53
14	Cyrille Neveu	France	51:32	1:57	4:47:13	3:03	3:07:56	8:51:44
15	Guido Gosselink	Netherlands	51:37	1:31	4:50:51	2:47	3:08:06	8:54:55
16	Dan Dethier	Luxembourg	53:41	1:46	4:48:41	3:15	3:09:17	8:56:41
17	Mikkel Olsen	Denmark	51:40	2:01	4:55:38	2:33	3:05:46	8:57:40
18	Robert Bocek	Czech Republic	54:21	1:53	5:01:42	1:46	2:58:55	8:58:39
19	Margus Tamm	Estonia	54:54	1:53	4:58:06	2:25	3:03:48	9:01:08
20	Werner Leitner	Austria	52:39	1:26	4:55:55	3:18	3:09:21	9:02:42
21	Federico Girasole	Italy	56:47	1:53	5:02:38	2:12	2:59:20	9:02:49
22	Clas Bjoerling	Sweden	1:04:51	1:38	4:57:34	1:18	2:59:35	9:04:59
23	Tamas Petr	Czech Republic	52:49	1:49	5:01:15	1:26	3:10:11	9:07:31
24	Johnny Pedersen	Denmark	51:44	1:42	4:50:49	1:41	3:26:00	9:11:56
25	Richard Van Diesen	Netherlands	53:33	1:37	4:53:26	3:22	3:21:36	9:13:34
26	Juan Izquierdo	Spain	54:26	2:00	5:03:42	2:23	3:11:05	9:13:37
27	Clas Myrestam	Sweden	53:47	1:30	5:03:39	2:25	3:13:29	9:14:51
28	Lawrence Oldershaw	Great Britain	59:12	1:57	5:13:33	1:11	3:05:13	9:21:08
29	Sergey Badanin	Russia	51:34	1:56	5:10:27	1:30	3:17:13	9:22:42
30	Charly Loisel	France	47:58	1:46	4:49:16	2:08	3:43:19	9:24:27
31	Stefano Paoli	Italy	53:24	1:31	5:03:23	1:53	3:32:07	9:32:23
32	Diego Gazzari	Italy	52:46	1:56	5:02:53	2:25	3:37:28	9:37:30
33	Mike Prince	Great Britain	59:21	2:36	5:14:03	2:31	3:24:50	9:43:24
34	Rune Skinnerlien	Norway	59:47	2:50	5:22:46	2:28	3:28:45	9:56:39
35	Raimundas Astrauskas	Lithuania	54:16	2:09	5:33:26	2:43	3:33:37	10:06:13
36	Espen Wagener	Norway	1:08:16	1:43	5:12:23	2:33	3:44:50	10:09:50
37	Martin Flinta	Sweden	59:31	1:49	5:14:37	2:24	4:28:34	10:46:58
Key : DNF - did not finish ; DNS - did not start

=== Women ===
The field of 22 was led home by Lisbeth Kristensen of Denmark.

Rank	Athlete	Nation	Swim	T1	Bike	T2	Run	Overall time
1st place, gold medalist(s)	Lisbeth Kristensen	Denmark	53:55	1:37	5:15:58	1:23	3:14:24	9:27:17
2nd place, silver medalist(s)	Lena Wahlqvist	Sweden	55:03	1:35	5:18:49	1:27	3:12:39	9:29:32
3rd place, bronze medalist(s)	Suzanne Nielsen	Denmark	53:44	1:46	5:26:15	1:34	3:22:44	9:46:02
4	Bianca Van Dijk	Netherlands	59:57	2:10	5:24:44	2:26	3:19:04	9:48:21
5	Karin Forsberg	Sweden	55:04	1:52	5:17:11	2:21	3:38:37	9:55:06
6	Marijke Zeekant	Netherlands	56:13	2:02	5:28:25	1:58	3:28:23	9:57:03
7	Megumi Shigaki	Japan	59:59	1:26	5:43:25	1:12	3:15:15	10:01:19
8	Anna Svardstörm	Sweden	1:04:13	1:52	5:16:24	1:28	3:40:10	10:04:08
9	Katja Mayer	Germany	1:04:01	2:02	5:26:17	1:31	3:35:59	10:09:52
10	Helene Salomon-Watson	France	58:10	2:05	5:38:50	2:40	3:28:36	10:10:21
11	Julie Rasmussen	Denmark	1:04:30	2:05	5:25:05	1:27	3:41:34	10:14:42
12	Erika Molnár	Hungary	55:40	1:45	5:51:06	1:25	3:25:11	10:15:08
13	Heidi Sessner	Germany	58:40	1:49	5:39:12	1:18	3:34:33	10:15:33
14	Cora Vlot	Netherlands	1:03:08	1:42	5:38:56	1:15	3:33:50	10:18:52
15	Riikka Vreeswijk-Kelja	Finland	1:00:02	1:54	5:45:49	2:05	3:34:59	10:24:48
16	Nicole Rayson	Hong Kong	58:37	2:12	5:42:57	2:44	3:38:25	10:24:55
17	Mariska Kramer-Postma	Netherlands	1:04:18	2:18	5:47:52	1:23	3:35:23	10:31:15
18	Ellen Kjaer	Denmark	1:15:53	2:18	5:53:25	2:18	3:33:42	10:47:36
19	Alexis Smith	United States	59:59	1:52	5:38:47	1:26	4:17:43	10:59:48
20	Florence Crowet	Belgium	1:05:17	3:09	5:58:39	2:12	3:52:25	11:01:42
21	Bodil Arlander	United States	1:13:12	4:06	5:54:04	3:01	3:59:31	11:13:54
22	Anna Kortelainen	Finland	1:09:32	1:48	6:04:50	1:30	4:09:53	11:27:33
Key : DNF - did not finish ; DNS - did not start
