= 1996 ITU Long Distance Triathlon World Championships =

International sports competition

World Long Distance Triathlon Championships
- Location: Muncie, United States
- Date: 7 September 1996

Champions
- Men: Greg Welch (Australia)
- Women: Karen Smyers (United States)

The 1996 ITU Long Distance Triathlon World Championships was a triathlon competition held in Muncie in United States on September 7, 1996, and organized by the International Triathlon Union, now World Triathlon. The Elite races for men and women consisted of a 1.9 km (1.2 mi) swim, 90 km (56 mi) bike and 21.1 km (13.1 mi) run, longer than the standard 1.5 km swim, 40 km bike and 10 km run associated with the World Triathlon Championship Series and the Olympic Games, but shorter than the classic Ironman Triathlon event.

The total distance was significantly shorter than the previous two editions held in Nice, and coincided exactly with the Half-Ironman distance that would become known as Ironman 70.3, referring to the total miles of the course, 70.3 mi (113.1 km).

== Medal Summary ==
| Event | Gold | | Silver | | Bronze | |
|---|---|---|---|---|---|---|
| Men | Greg Welch; Australia | 3:47:05 | Luc Van Lierde; Belgium | 3:47:54 | Spencer Smith; Great Britain | 3:49:20 |
| Women | Karen Smyers; United States | 4:11:00 | fr:Sophie Delemer; France | 4:12:14 | fr:Suzanne Nielsen; Denmark | 4:14:15 |

== Results ==
The following are the results of the elite races:

=== Men ===
| Rank | Athlete | Swim | T1 | Bike | T2 | Run | Overall time |
|---|---|---|---|---|---|---|---|
| 1st place, gold medalist(s) | Greg Welch (AUS) | 24:27 | 1:46 | 2:07:35 | 0:46 | 1:12:29 | 3:47:05 |
| 2nd place, silver medalist(s) | Luc Van Lierde (BEL) | 24:16 | 1:42 | 2:06:21 | 1:08 | 1:14:26 | 3:47:54 |
| 3rd place, bronze medalist(s) | Spencer Smith (GBR) | 24:18 | 1:50 | 2:06:10 | 1:06 | 1:15:53 | 3:49:20 |
| 4 | Jamie Hunt (NZL) | 24:52 | 1:31 | 2:07:24 | 0:46 | 1:14:53 | 3:49:29 |
| 5 | Dennis Looze (NED) | 24:09 | 1:50 | 2:07:51 | 0:51 | 1:15:16 | 3:50:01 |
| 6 | Peter Sandvang (DEN) | 26:05 | 1:43 | 2:03:02 | 1:10 | 1:18:33 | 3:50:34 |
| 7 | Mark Bates (CAN) | 25:56 | 1:38 | 2:06:15 | 0:51 | 1:16:03 | 3:50:45 |
| 8 | Chuck Veylupek (USA) | 26:07 | 1:57 | 2:05:49 | 1:08 | 1:16:44 | 3:51:49 |
| 9 | Andriy Yastrebov (UKR) | 26:18 | 1:46 | 2:05:43 | 0:49 | 1:17:54 | 3:52:33 |
| 10 | Bent Andersen (DEN) | 26:14 | 2:09 | 2:07:42 | 1:06 | 1:16:10 | 3:53:20 |
| 11 | Christopher Legh (AUS) | 26:03 | 1:37 | 2:03:47 | 0:59 | 1:21:13 | 3:53:40 |
| 12 | Rolf Lautenbacher (GER) | 27:03 | 1:43 | 2:06:07 | 1:20 | 1:17:32 | 3:53:47 |
| 13 | Matthias Klumpp (GER) | 26:59 | 1:49 | 2:07:20 | 1:06 | 1:17:14 | 3:54:29 |
| 14 | Holger Lorenz (GER) | 26:08 | 1:42 | 2:05:59 | 1:08 | 1:19:35 | 3:54:34 |
| 15 | Eric Lacaze (FRA) | 26:01 | 1:41 | 2:06:04 | 1:03 | 1:20:07 | 3:54:58 |
| 16 | Stefan Holzner (GER) | 27:02 | 1:52 | 2:04:57 | 1:08 | 1:20:02 | 3:55:03 |
| 17 | Danilo Palmucci (ITA) | 26:24 | 1:38 | 2:05:51 | 1:08 | 1:21:02 | 3:56:07 |
| 18 | Jiri Seidl (CZE) | 27:41 | 1:46 | 2:06:36 | 0:56 | 1:19:25 | 3:56:25 |
| 19 | Hektor Llanos Burguera (ESP) | 25:52 | 1:42 | 2:06:18 | 1:06 | 1:21:40 | 3:56:41 |
| 20 | Bruce Thomas (USA) | 25:49 | 2:00 | 2:06:02 | 1:03 | 1:22:22 | 3:57:18 |
| 21 | Grant Webster (AUS) | 27:18 | 1:35 | 2:07:16 | 0:58 | 1:20:30 | 3:57:38 |
| 22 | Dirk Van Gossum (BEL) | 27:39 | 1:47 | 2:06:17 | 1:20 | 1:20:47 | 3:57:53 |
| 23 | Sylvain Le Bris (FRA) | 26:02 | 1:43 | 2:08:24 | 1:03 | 1:21:19 | 3:58:34 |
| 24 | Uwe Widmann (GER) | 26:14 | 1:37 | 2:08:10 | 1:13 | 1:21:31 | 3:58:47 |
| 25 | Ricardo Cardeno (COL) | 26:01 | 1:34 | 2:08:58 | 1:03 | 1:22:24 | 4:00:03 |
| 26 | Albuin Schwarz (AUT) | 26:44 | 1:52 | 2:07:35 | 1:13 | 1:22:45 | 4:00:10 |
| 27 | Taro Shirato (JPN) | 25:57 | 1:38 | 2:08:33 | 0:53 | 1:23:10 | 4:00:13 |
| 28 | Eric Harr (USA) | 26:41 | 1:56 | 2:04:50 | 1:03 | 1:26:06 | 4:00:35 |
| 29 | Cyrille Neveu (FRA) | 26:05 | 1:39 | 2:06:05 | 1:13 | 1:25:39 | 4:00:44 |
| 30 | Eduardo Arenal (ESP) | 30:07 | 1:45 | 2:11:24 | 1:16 | 1:17:20 | 4:01:53 |
| 31 | Jose Ricardo González Dávila (MEX) | 25:02 | 1:54 | 2:07:23 | 1:26 | 1:27:02 | 4:02:47 |
| 32 | Daniel Hechenblaickner (AUT) | 26:53 | 2:09 | 2:07:04 | 1:13 | 1:25:59 | 4:03:18 |
| 33 | Walter Thorburn (NZL) | 27:20 | 1:43 | 2:12:43 | 1:09 | 1:20:54 | 4:03:49 |
| 34 | Sebastien Libicz (FRA) | 26:03 | 1:51 | 2:05:59 | 1:01 | 1:29:09 | 4:04:03 |
| 35 | Cristian Bustos Mancilla (CHI) | 26:14 | 1:57 | 2:05:45 | 1:04 | 1:29:53 | 4:04:53 |
| 36 | Greg Thompson (USA) | 26:06 | 1:52 | 2:13:22 | 1:06 | 1:23:03 | 4:05:29 |
| 37 | Boris Tanev (BUL) | 25:59 | 1:49 | 2:08:21 | 0:57 | 1:28:58 | 4:06:04 |
| 38 | Marcel Vifian (USA) | 27:45 | 2:07 | 2:11:27 | 1:13 | 1:24:05 | 4:06:37 |
| 39 | Jasper Blake (CAN) | 27:33 | 1:37 | 2:14:11 | 0:57 | 1:22:35 | 4:06:53 |
| 40 | Peter Valentyik (USA) | 26:00 | 1:50 | 2:06:07 | 1:12 | 1:32:14 | 4:07:23 |
| 41 | Federico Girasole (ITA) | 30:05 | 1:56 | 2:11:18 | 1:14 | 1:24:18 | 4:08:51 |
| 42 | Jason Ormston (RSA) | 29:32 | 2:30 | 2:11:21 | 1:05 | 1:25:17 | 4:09:45 |
| 43 | Tim Stewart (GBR) | 30:11 | 2:01 | 2:11:09 | 1:09 | 1:25:17 | 4:09:47 |
| 44 | Hideki Yamane (JPN) | 28:42 | 1:41 | 2:12:58 | 1:03 | 1:25:55 | 4:10:19 |
| 45 | Martin Breedijk (NED) | 27:31 | 2:02 | 2:15:06 | 1:08 | 1:24:53 | 4:10:40 |
| 46 | Mark Matthews (AUS) | 26:21 | 1:48 | 2:07:55 | 0:59 | 1:34:22 | 4:11:25 |
| 47 | Patrick Brown (USA) | 26:25 | 1:49 | 2:07:55 | 1:08 | 1:34:57 | 4:12:14 |
| 48 | Francisco Zurob (CHI) | 27:22 | 2:04 | 2:06:49 | 1:08 | 1:35:48 | 4:13:11 |
| 49 | Peter Ouchterlony (CAN) | 28:39 | 2:20 | 2:12:20 | 1:03 | 1:28:56 | 4:13:18 |
| 50 | Ralph Hienkens (NED) | 27:43 | 1:59 | 2:11:35 | 1:20 | 1:31:24 | 4:14:01 |
| 51 | Richard Pady (CAN) | 27:35 | 1:36 | 2:16:20 | 1:01 | 1:27:52 | 4:14:24 |
| 52 | Lars Mattson (SWE) | 27:50 | 2:24 | 2:13:15 | 1:08 | 1:30:06 | 4:14:43 |
| 53 | Don King (CAN) | 29:20 | 1:55 | 2:16:57 | 1:17 | 1:28:20 | 4:17:49 |
| 54 | Dan Dethier (LUX) | 29:41 | 2:12 | 2:11:23 | 1:09 | 1:34:39 | 4:19:04 |
| 55 | John Sillery (USA) | 30:00 | 1:56 | 2:23:31 | 1:07 | 1:22:35 | 4:19:09 |
| 56 | Peter Younghusband (GBR) | 30:04 | 1:48 | 2:11:23 | 1:12 | 1:35:47 | 4:20:14 |
| 57 | James Stephenson (CAN) | 24:23 | 2:00 | 2:15:21 | 1:14 | 1:37:31 | 4:20:29 |
| 58 | Daniel Labarca (CHI) | 32:42 | 2:12 | 2:20:41 | 1:21 | 1:26:42 | 4:23:38 |
| 59 | Calvin Zaryski (CAN) | 29:57 | 2:32 | 2:21:17 | 1:49 | 1:28:32 | 4:24:07 |
| 60 | Cyle Sage (USA) | 24:31 | 1:58 | 2:10:00 | 1:21 | 1:46:33 | 4:24:23 |
| 61 | Brian Carter (RSA) | 28:34 | 1:56 | 2:24:58 | 0:58 | 1:29:21 | 4:25:47 |
| 62 | Yaniv Atzmon (ISR) | 26:19 | 1:55 | 2:20:42 | 1:18 | 1:42:39 | 4:32:53 |
| 63 | Redgy Tytgat (BEL) | 40:20 | 2:27 | 2:24:52 | 1:34 | 1:35:40 | 4:44:53 |
Key : DNF - did not finish ; DNS - did not start

=== Women ===
41 athletes competed in the elite women's event.

| Rank | Athlete | Swim | T1 | Bike | T2 | Run | Overall time |
|---|---|---|---|---|---|---|---|
| 1st place, gold medalist(s) | Karen Smyers (USA) | 26:42 | 1:46 | 2:13:47 | 1:01 | 1:27:43 | 4:11:00 |
| 2nd place, silver medalist(s) | Sophie Delemer (FRA) | 27:12 | 1:42 | 2:11:25 | 0:53 | 1:30:59 | 4:12:14 |
| 3rd place, bronze medalist(s) | Suzanne Nielsen (DEN) | 26:47 | 1:49 | 2:19:02 | 1:06 | 1:25:28 | 4:14:15 |
| 4 | Natascha Badmann (SUI) | 29:10 | 1:54 | 2:18:31 | 1:06 | 1:26:54 | 4:17:38 |
| 5 | Wieke Hoogzaad (NED) | 26:38 | 1:56 | 2:17:39 | 1:06 | 1:34:22 | 4:21:43 |
| 6 | Julie Nievergelt (USA) | 26:38 | 1:47 | 2:21:08 | 1:18 | 1:32:18 | 4:23:14 |
| 7 | Brigitte Scheithauer (GER) | 26:37 | 1:45 | 2:19:37 | 1:10 | 1:34:30 | 4:23:39 |
| 8 | Sian Welch (USA) | 28:22 | 1:57 | 2:17:16 | 1:13 | 1:35:07 | 4:23:58 |
| 9 | Ines Estedt (GER) | 29:22 | 2:04 | 2:21:04 | 1:20 | 1:31:34 | 4:25:25 |
| 10 | Jill Newman (USA) | 28:30 | 2:06 | 2:23:21 | 1:16 | 1:30:32 | 4:25:49 |
| 11 | Bianca Van Woesik (AUS) | 28:29 | 1:50 | 2:22:10 | 1:13 | 1:32:57 | 4:26:41 |
| 12 | Lucienne Groenendijk (NED) | 28:30 | 1:57 | 2:21:58 | 1:27 | 1:33:37 | 4:27:32 |
| 13 | Lauren Maule (USA) | 28:30 | 2:33 | 2:22:39 | 1:38 | 1:32:27 | 4:27:49 |
| 14 | Marijke Zeekant (NED) | 28:20 | 2:06 | 2:23:19 | 1:27 | 1:32:58 | 4:28:12 |
| 15 | Lauren Alexander (USA) | 30:25 | 1:49 | 2:22:33 | 1:10 | 1:32:42 | 4:28:41 |
| 16 | Lisa Bentley (CAN) | 28:57 | 1:45 | 2:25:48 | 1:11 | 1:31:34 | 4:29:16 |
| 17 | Kari Bailey (CAN) | 26:44 | 1:45 | 2:24:00 | 1:13 | 1:35:55 | 4:29:38 |
| 18 | Beth Homan (USA) | 29:10 | 2:09 | 2:26:42 | 1:23 | 1:30:40 | 4:30:05 |
| 19 | Virginia Berasategi Luna (ESP) | 28:02 | 2:09 | 2:29:51 | 1:11 | 1:29:57 | 4:31:13 |
| 20 | Lena Wahlqvist (SWE) | 28:24 | 2:10 | 2:26:22 | 1:25 | 1:34:40 | 4:33:03 |
| 21 | Kerstin Weule (USA) | 27:59 | 1:53 | 2:25:52 | 1:04 | 1:36:17 | 4:33:08 |
| 22 | Sharon Sander (USA) | 29:05 | 2:27 | 2:22:06 | 1:20 | 1:38:08 | 4:33:09 |
| 23 | Claudia Cortes (CHI) | 26:49 | 2:02 | 2:27:04 | 1:18 | 1:35:59 | 4:33:14 |
| 24 | Belinda Smith (AUS) | 28:08 | 2:06 | 2:24:16 | 1:06 | 1:37:40 | 4:33:18 |
| 25 | Beatrice Mouthon (FRA) | 27:13 | 1:49 | 2:26:49 | 1:10 | 1:36:39 | 4:33:40 |
| 26 | María Luisa Martínez Álvarez (MEX) | 28:21 | 1:57 | 2:26:49 | 1:23 | 1:35:51 | 4:34:22 |
| 27 | Sonja Frank (CAN) | 28:06 | 1:53 | 2:27:06 | 1:38 | 1:35:50 | 4:34:34 |
| 28 | Vivienne Williams (RSA) | 28:58 | 2:01 | 2:29:04 | 1:20 | 1:34:10 | 4:35:33 |
| 29 | Blandine Lefebvre (FRA) | 30:27 | 2:06 | 2:30:05 | 1:16 | 1:32:02 | 4:36:00 |
| 30 | Katinka Wiltenburg (NED) | 32:09 | 1:54 | 2:31:16 | 1:29 | 1:31:48 | 4:38:38 |
| 31 | Maria Carmenza Morales (COL) | 30:29 | 1:56 | 2:27:46 | 1:29 | 1:37:12 | 4:38:52 |
| 32 | Katja Mayer (GER) | 32:10 | 2:17 | 2:24:37 | 1:20 | 1:38:42 | 4:39:06 |
| 33 | Fiona Mckee (NZL) | 34:41 | 2:12 | 2:30:04 | 1:36 | 1:30:45 | 4:39:18 |
| 34 | Donna Peters (USA) | 28:44 | 2:21 | 2:23:12 | 1:33 | 1:47:55 | 4:43:45 |
| 35 | Claire Wallington (GBR) | 28:53 | 2:21 | 2:28:45 | 1:50 | 1:42:25 | 4:44:14 |
| 36 | Elise Sachs (USA) | 31:04 | 2:09 | 2:32:51 | 1:28 | 1:41:10 | 4:48:42 |
| 37 | Mairead Silverstone (RSA) | 43:41 | 2:24 | 2:21:35 | 1:55 | 1:41:07 | 4:50:42 |
| 38 | Kathy Stetz (USA) | 31:36 | 2:13 | 2:35:32 | 2:00 | 1:41:12 | 4:52:33 |
| 39 | Kim Isherwood (DEN) | 37:20 | 2:18 | 2:32:57 | 1:33 | 1:45:46 | 4:59:54 |
| 40 | Katherine Sodek (CAN) | 32:17 | 2:08 | 2:31:42 | 2:03 | 1:51:57 | 5:00:07 |
| 41 | Marie Josee Gervais (CAN) | 37:40 | 2:22 | 2:36:27 | 1:09 | 1:53:05 | 5:10:43 |
Key : DNF - did not finish ; DNS - did not start

=== Age-group championships ===
Along side the eleite races a series of age-group championship races were also held. The winner of each classification is listed below:

| Classification | Athlete | Nation | Overall time |
|---|---|---|---|
| 20-24 Female | Jolene Pfulb | United States | 05:09:34 |
| 20-24 Male | James Bonney | United States | 04:10:51 |
| 25-29 Female | Laura Drake | United States | 04:28:23 |
| 25-29 Male | Austin Parker | New Zealand | 04:07:13 |
| 30-34 Female | Donna Kay-Ness | United States | 04:32:22 |
| 30-34 Male | Rich Heilman | United States | 04:10:36 |
| 35-39 Female | Alisa Goughnour | United States | 04:47:34 |
| 35-39 Male | Tony Schiller | United States | 04:10:54 |
| 40-44 Female | Laura Sophiea | United States | 04:48:18 |
| 40-44 Male | Mac Martin | United States | 04:07:48 |
| 45-49 Female | Terese Van Lare | Netherlands | 04:53:12 |
| 45-49 Male | Anthony Zerbst | Australia | 04:29:36 |
| 50-54 Female | Barbara Warren | United States | 05:10:23 |
| 50-54 Male | Harry Webb | Great Britain | 04:36:09 |
| 55-59 Female | Susan Bradley-Cox | United States | 05:38:42 |
| 55-59 Male | James Fahrbach | United States | 05:00:27 |
| 60-64 Female | Joanne Kambur | Great Britain | 08:03:44 |
| 60-64 Male | Robert Goddard | New Zealand | 04:59:49 |
| 65-69 Female | Madonna Buder | United States | 06:10:35 |
| 65-69 Male | David Staley | United States | 05:22:07 |
| 70-74 Female | Lynn Edwards | United States | 08:05:30 |
| 70-74 Male | Jerry Kenney | United States | 06:02:50 |
| 75-79 Male | James Ward | United States | 07:38:10 |
