= 1997 ITU Long Distance Triathlon World Championships =

International sports competition

World Long Distance Triathlon Championships
- Location: Nice, France
- Date: June 8 1997
- Competitors: 48 (30 men, 18 women)

Champions
- Men: Luc Van Lierde (Belgium)
- Women: Ines Estedt (Germany)

The 1997 ITU Long Distance Triathlon World Championships was a triathlon competition held in Nice in France on June 8 1997 and organized by the International Triathlon Union, now World Triathlon. The Elite races for men and consisted of a 4 km (2.5 mi) swim, 120 km (75 mi) bike and 30 km (19 mi) run, longer than the standard 1.5 km swim, 40 km bike and 10 km run associated with the World Triathlon Championship Series and the Olympic Games, but shorter than the classic Ironman Triathlon event. It was the fourth edition of the championships.

== Medal Summary ==
Event	Gold		Silver		Bronze	
Men	Luc Van Lierde; Belgium	5:35:44	Rob Barel; Netherlands	5:39:47	Jean-Christophe Guinchard; Switzerland	5:41:00
Women	Ines Estedt; Germany	6:14:23	Isabelle Mouthon-Michellys; France	6:21:23	Virginia Berasategi; Spain	6:25:51

== Results ==
The following are the results of the elite races:

=== Men ===
30 athletes started and completed the race, led home by Belgian Luc Van Lierde.

Rank	Athlete	Nation	Swim	T1	Bike	T2	Run	Overall time
1st place, gold medalist(s)	Luc Van Lierde	Belgium	49:20	2:05	2:57:23	1:42	1:45:10	5:35:44
2nd place, silver medalist(s)	Rob Barel	Netherlands	51:31	1:49	2:56:31	1:38	1:41:16	5:39:47
3rd place, bronze medalist(s)	Jean-Christophe Guinchard	Switzerland	51:40	1:56	2:59:35	1:34	1:46:12	5:41:00
4	Peter Sandvang	Denmark	51:46	1:50	2:57:44	1:37	1:50:09	5:43:08
5	Christoph Mauch	Switzerland	54:04	1:49	3:04:00	n/r	1:46:49	5:46:42
6	David Hyam	South Africa	51:37	1:57	3:03:01	1:46	1:49:39	5:48:01
7	Anton Van Zyl	South Africa	49:19	1:52	3:01:11	1:42	1:55:38	5:49:43
8	Vasilis Krommidas	Greece	51:43	2:05	3:02:51	1:33	1:51:44	5:49:56
9	Olivier Marceau	Switzerland	51:43	1:52	2:59:45	1:42	1:55:06	5:50:10
10	Conrad Stoltz	South Africa	51:35	2:06	3:07:36	1:54	1:48:22	5:51:36
11	Stefan Holzner	Germany	53:30	2:15	3:04:07	1:46	1:50:45	5:52:25
12	Cyrille Neveu	France	51:46	1:49	2:59:37	1:37	1:58:07	5:52:57
13	Francisco Javier Marco	Spain	49:16	1:49	3:05:28	1:46	1:54:57	5:53:17
14	Mark Bates	Canada	51:29	1:52	3:08:08	1:34	1:50:15	5:53:19
15	Matthias Klumpp	Germany	53:33	2:09	3:05:43	1:41	1:51:17	5:54:23
16	Rolf Lautenbacher	Germany	55:21	2:15	3:05:18	1:21	1:50:18	5:54:36
17	Francois Chabaud	France	51:46	1:53	3:07:34	1:42	1:53:12	5:56:09
18	Martin Breedijk	Netherlands	56:49	2:02	3:00:58	1:26	1:56:06	5:57:25
19	Dirk Van Gossum	Belgium	55:18	2:08	3:05:13	1:33	1:55:12	5:59:25
20	Richard Van Diesen	Netherlands	56:59	1:54	3:06:25	1:41	1:53:05	6:00:07
21	Danilo Palmucci	Italy	53:33	2:01	3:12:26	1:50	1:50:32	6:00:26
22	Hektor Llanos Burguera	Spain	51:39	2:08	3:13:37	1:53	1:52:20	6:01:38
23	Joachim Van Der Auwera	Belgium	55:07	1:53	3:00:39	1:34	2:02:37	6:01:52
24	Paul White	Canada	54:11	2:13	3:11:47	1:35	1:52:24	6:02:12
25	Andriy Yastrebov	Ukraine	54:10	1:49	3:12:11	1:46	1:54:01	6:03:57
26	Bernardo Zetina	Mexico	51:48	1:46	3:09:48	1:46	2:01:03	6:05:14
27	Machiel Utmann	Netherlands	55:10	1:57	3:07:14	3:37	1:58:26	6:06:27
28	Trondeval Hansen	Norway	55:12	2:20	3:08:37	1:42	2:00:32	6:08:27
29	Per Nilsson	Denmark	53:40	2:13	3:02:59	1:49	2:07:59	6:08:40
30	Taro Shirato	Japan	51:31	1:46	3:14:26	1:27	2:00:27	6:09:41
Key : DNF - did not finish ; DNS - did not start; n/r : not recorded

=== Women ===
18 athletes took to the water in Nice, all of whom completed the course. They were led home by the German Ines Estedt.

Rank	Athlete	Nation	Swim	T1	Bike	T2	Run	Overall time
1st place, gold medalist(s)	Ines Estedt	Germany	54:01	2:05	3:12:19	3:26	2:02:27	6:14:23
2nd place, silver medalist(s)	Isabelle Mouthon-Michellys	France	53:51	1:54	3:24:37	2:36	1:59:22	6:21:23
3rd place, bronze medalist(s)	Virginia Berasategi	Spain	53:57	2:20	3:19:03	3:46	2:06:44	6:25:51
4	Christine De Wit	Netherlands	53:52	2:12	3:24:22	1:39	2:11:22	6:33:28
5	Mieke Suys	Belgium	53:59	1:47	3:32:53	1:49	2:05:24	6:35:57
6	Beatrice Mouthon	France	53:57	1:58	3:34:46	3:27	2:03:22	6:37:33
7	Sophie Delemer	France	-	-	-	-	-	6:45:44
8	Julie Nievergelt	United States	-	-	-	-	-	6:43:29
9	Jackie Corrigan	Great Britain	57:18	2:20	3:33:49	2:15	2:15:19	6:51:03
10	Nerea Martinez Urruzola	Spain	58:59	2:40	3:33:03	1:47	2:17:26	6:53:57
11	Marijke Zeekant	Netherlands	57:00	2:08	3:31:34	2:05	2:21:30	6:54:17
12	Jacqueline Van Vliet	Netherlands	1:02:19	2:29	3:27:46	2:13	2:24:09	6:58:57
13	Mirella Gandellini	Italy	1:05:11	2:41	3:28:43	1:53	2:20:47	6:59:16
14	Kim Isherwood	Denmark	59:36	3:13	3:37:58	2:28	2:20:06	7:03:22
15	Sonja Frank	Canada	58:56	2:39	3:40:25	2:05	2:24:09	7:08:16
16	Tara Lee Marshall	New Zealand	1:05:53	2:16	3:37:23	2:16	2:35:46	7:23:37
17	Rachel Louise Dumont Playfair	Canada	1:03:59	2:19	3:39:26	2:17	3:36:58	8:25:03
18	Suzanna Degazon	Puerto Rico	1:43:06	6:00	4:22:45	4:27	2:56:56	9:13:17
Key : DNF - did not finish ; DNS - did not start
