= 1999 ITU Long Distance Triathlon World Championships =

International sports competition

World Long Distance Triathlon Championships
- Location: Säter, Sweden
- Date: July 11 1999
- Competitors: 89 (59 men, 30 women)

Champions
- Men: Peter Sandvang (Denmark)
- Women: Suzanne Nielsen (Denmark)

The 1999 ITU Long Distance Triathlon World Championships was a triathlon competition held in Säter in Sweden on July 11 1999 and organized by the International Triathlon Union, now World Triathlon. The Elite races for men and women consisted of a 4 km (2.5 mi) swim, 120 km (75 mi) bike and 30 km (19 mi) run, longer than the standard 1.5 km swim, 40 km bike and 10 km run associated with the World Triathlon Championship Series and the Olympic Games, but shorter than the classic Ironman Triathlon event.

Danish athletes won three of the six medals, including both golds.

== Medal Summary ==
Event	Gold		Silver		Bronze	
Men	Peter Sandvang; Denmark	5:44:04	Torbjorn Sindballe; Denmark	5:48:27	Massimo Guadagni; Italy	5:49:51
Women	Suzanne Nielsen; Denmark	6:20:17	Joanne King; Australia	6:22:20	Jasmine Hämmerle; Austria	6:25:24

== Results ==
The following are the results of the elite races:

=== Men ===
59 men took to the startline from an initial entry of 83. All athletes who started the race completed the course, led home by Denmark's Peter Sandvang.

Rank	Athlete	Nation	Swim	T1	Bike	T2	Run	Overall time
1st place, gold medalist(s)	Peter Sandvang	Denmark	49:11	1:01	2:54:11	0:59	1:58:39	5:44:04
2nd place, silver medalist(s)	Torbjorn Sindballe	Denmark	50:39	1:13	3:01:40	0:56	1:53:56	5:48:27
3rd place, bronze medalist(s)	Massimo Guadagni	Italy	50:56	0:59	3:03:03	1:10	1:53:41	5:49:51
4	Gilles Reboul	France	49:13	0:56	3:05:01	0:51	1:54:32	5:50:35
5	Cameron Brown	New Zealand	49:15	1:01	3:04:54	0:56	1:55:22	5:51:29
6	Patrik Tjardal	Sweden	50:50	1:13	3:03:09	0:53	1:56:48	5:52:55
7	Tero Hyppoelae	Finland	50:53	1:11	3:03:21	0:46	1:57:48	5:54:01
8	Marc Herremans	Belgium	51:48	0:58	3:01:43	1:20	1:58:26	5:54:19
9	Mika Luoto	Finland	49:15	1:03	3:05:06	0:46	1:58:47	5:54:58
10	Cyrille Neveu	France	49:14	1:11	3:04:47	0:53	1:59:50	5:55:56
11	Jonas Colting	Sweden	49:16	1:01	3:04:57	0:49	2:00:13	5:56:19
12	Francois Chabaud	France	49:37	0:53	3:04:44	0:51	2:00:28	5:56:36
13	Jan Van Der Marel	Netherlands	55:21	0:59	3:08:10	0:49	1:51:51	5:57:13
14	Damjan Zepic	Slovenia	50:50	1:01	3:06:57	0:39	1:58:19	5:57:47
15	Menno Oudeman	Netherlands	53:55	1:25	3:05:41	0:43	1:56:57	5:58:41
16	Xavier Le Floch	France	49:14	0:59	3:10:01	1:01	1:57:52	5:59:08
17	Allan Mansson	Denmark	49:07	1:04	2:58:46	1:01	2:09:46	5:59:47
18	Stefan Hachul	Germany	50:55	1:08	3:03:41	1:16	2:02:55	5:59:59
19	Ricardo Costa	Portugal	53:47	1:20	3:05:41	0:46	1:58:43	6:00:19
20	Craig Alexander	Australia	49:16	0:58	3:05:07	0:51	2:04:33	6:00:46
21	Richard Van Diesen	Netherlands	53:52	1:10	3:05:40	0:49	1:59:26	6:00:58
22	Petr Vabrousek	Czech Republic	49:16	0:53	3:11:22	0:46	1:58:47	6:01:06
23	Per Nilsson	Denmark	53:54	1:23	3:05:28	1:08	1:59:27	6:01:20
24	Mikkel Hoeiberg-Oisen	Denmark	50:55	1:49	3:01:57	1:23	2:05:50	6:01:57
25	Andy Kelsey	United States	49:12	1:03	3:06:10	1:18	2:04:30	6:02:15
26	Tom Soderdahl	Finland	50:48	1:13	3:04:27	0:58	2:05:37	6:03:06
27	Albuin Schwarz	Austria	53:03	1:11	3:06:37	0:56	2:03:01	6:04:47
28	Tommi Putkuri	Finland	50:51	1:08	3:03:06	0:53	2:08:55	6:04:54
29	Nicola Carpenese	Italy	53:01	1:01	3:11:00	1:25	2:00:20	6:06:47
30	Andrew Robertson	Australia	49:11	0:56	3:08:35	0:53	2:08:28	6:08:03
31	Patrick Vernay	France	49:13	1:08	3:04:54	0:53	2:12:05	6:08:13
32	Eduardo Arenal	Spain	1:00:53	1:13	3:14:23	0:41	1:51:27	6:08:38
33	Shingo Tani	Japan	53:36	1:20	3:09:44	1:01	2:03:21	6:09:04
34	Tamas Petr	Czech Republic	49:18	1:08	3:04:15	1:13	2:14:00	6:09:56
35	Dan Dethier	Luxembourg	55:17	1:30	3:08:57	1:06	2:08:37	6:15:27
36	Mischa Kleveringa	Netherlands	53:46	1:11	3:09:24	0:58	2:10:15	6:15:34
37	Stephen Farrell	New Zealand	50:52	1:01	3:09:24	1:03	2:13:11	6:15:35
38	Jonas Bergabo	Sweden	50:54	1:16	3:08:45	1:23	2:13:15	6:15:37
39	Federico Girasole	Italy	58:37	1:29	3:09:46	1:16	2:06:23	6:17:32
40	Kirill Litovshenko	Estonia	53:58	1:16	3:10:43	1:18	2:10:31	6:17:50
41	Anssi Lehtinen	Finland	1:03:13	1:06	3:12:50	1:01	1:59:55	6:18:07
42	Paul Anderson	New Zealand	50:11	1:30	3:12:45	1:30	2:18:00	6:24:00
43	Yannick Bourseaux	France	49:16	0:53	3:05:11	0:46	2:28:19	6:24:27
44	Jose Luis Cano Villanueva	Spain	1:01:04	1:39	3:22:25	1:08	1:58:42	6:25:02
45	Jos Van Der Auwera	Belgium	54:00	1:20	3:05:28	0:56	2:24:36	6:26:22
46	P Magndal	Norway	53:54	1:29	3:19:38	2:05	2:11:56	6:29:04
47	Marco Salamon	Italy	53:55	0:58	3:06:34	0:58	2:26:58	6:29:24
48	Kari Gerkman	Finland	56:10	1:08	3:27:17	1:11	2:04:04	6:29:52
49	Luis Filipe Lopes	Portugal	1:00:57	1:33	3:25:38	2:19	2:09:54	6:40:22
50	Tsuyoshi Aoyama	Japan	57:51	1:11	3:29:37	1:11	2:10:57	6:40:51
51	Matjaz Kovac	Slovenia	58:33	1:11	3:28:26	0:53	2:13:36	6:42:42
52	Ted As	Sweden	57:51	1:03	3:17:03	1:11	2:33:56	6:51:08
53	Ryan James	Great Britain	53:23	1:13	3:21:36	0:56	2:34:47	6:51:57
54	Rune Skinnerlien	Norway	1:01:03	2:01	3:21:26	1:15	2:28:57	6:54:44
55	Antonio Jourdan	Portugal	1:02:21	2:05	3:32:50	1:49	2:21:35	7:00:42
56	Giannis Psarelis	Greece	1:02:07	1:42	3:33:12	1:31	2:27:09	7:05:42
57	Peter Walker	Australia	1:02:04	1:29	3:23:34	1:23	2:45:48	7:14:19
58	Glenn Taylor	New Zealand	1:00:04	1:33	3:26:01	1:38	2:52:26	7:21:44
59	Max Fegan	Australia	55:33	1:16	3:39:11	1:18	2:52:16	7:29:33
Key : DNF - did not finish ; DNS - did not start

=== Women ===
30 women began and finished the race, from an initial entry of 33, led home by Denmark's Suzanne Nielsen.

Rank	Athlete	Nation	Swim	T1	Bike	T2	Run	Overall time
1st place, gold medalist(s)	Suzanne Nielsen	Denmark	53:17	1:01	3:20:22	0:59	2:04:35	6:20:17
2nd place, silver medalist(s)	Joanne King	Australia	53:31	1:27	3:23:50	0:48	2:02:42	6:22:20
3rd place, bronze medalist(s)	Jasmine Hämmerle	Austria	53:46	1:13	3:23:51	0:44	2:05:47	6:25:24
4	Lena Wahlqvist	Sweden	53:55	1:08	3:23:28	1:04	2:08:49	6:28:25
5	Karen Smyers	United States	53:37	1:06	3:23:43	1:06	2:12:16	6:31:49
6	Robyn Roocke	Australia	58:12	1:04	3:22:15	0:56	2:11:04	6:33:34
7	Joanna Zieger	United States	53:19	1:25	3:24:07	0:51	2:16:59	6:36:41
8	Marijke Zeekant	Netherlands	53:50	1:11	3:31:59	1:08	2:20:51	6:49:02
9	Alison Hayden	United States	53:33	1:34	3:30:50	0:59	2:24:19	6:51:17
10	Melissa Spooner	Canada	58:10	1:15	3:21:46	1:13	2:31:24	6:53:50
11	Bianca Van Dijk	Netherlands	1:03:32	1:31	3:33:20	1:06	2:17:15	6:56:49
12	Ariane Gutknecht	Switzerland	1:03:27	1:20	3:33:37	1:04	2:18:11	6:57:43
13	Heidi Sessner	Germany	59:09	1:16	3:44:15	0:53	2:12:33	6:58:07
14	Belinda Smith	Australia	54:13	1:08	3:32:06	0:56	2:30:23	6:58:49
15	Gudrun Stephensen	Denmark	1:02:24	1:33	3:34:31	1:11	2:22:04	7:01:46
16	Cora Vlot	Netherlands	1:03:30	1:38	3:33:17	1:18	2:23:21	7:03:07
17	Belinda Cheney	Australia	53:25	1:18	3:41:51	0:53	2:25:55	7:03:27
18	Alessia Bertolino	Italy	1:05:57	1:46	3:34:34	1:04	2:22:25	7:05:49
19	Anna Svardstörm	Sweden	1:07:38	1:20	3:27:31	0:58	2:29:16	7:06:43
20	Jane Warren	Australia	53:52	1:06	3:41:26	1:06	2:29:38	7:07:12
21	Jenny Gottsche	Australia	1:03:34	1:27	3:33:27	1:16	2:28:19	7:08:06
22	Ann Eldegard	Norway	53:58	1:21	3:32:04	1:06	2:42:48	7:11:18
23	Noriko Yamakura	Japan	59:12	1:23	3:47:05	1:01	2:23:41	7:12:24
24	Minna Pihala	Finland	1:13:22	1:29	3:31:34	1:16	2:27:01	7:14:46
25	Marianne Bruun	Norway	1:12:23	1:52	3:32:24	1:53	2:33:49	7:22:21
26	Sonja Terblanche	South Africa	1:12:32	1:57	3:40:39	1:21	2:44:46	7:41:17
27	Stefanie Arndt	Germany	1:07:32	1:16	3:50:38	1:21	2:41:22	7:42:11
28	Lorraine Barry	South Africa	1:12:23	1:30	3:54:02	1:34	2:35:24	7:44:55
29	Julie Rasmussen	Denmark	1:07:20	1:21	3:50:11	1:03	2:47:11	7:47:10
30	Janette Beaton	Great Britain	1:16:20	1:45	3:50:48	1:08	2:44:37	7:54:40
Key : DNF - did not finish ; DNS - did not start
