= 1998 ITU Long Distance Triathlon World Championships =

International sports competition

World Long Distance Triathlon Championships
- Location: Sado Island, Japan
- Date: September 5 1998
- Competitors: 67 (43 men, 24 women)

Champions
- Men: Luc Van Lierde (Belgium)
- Women: Rina Bradshaw-Hill (Australia)

The 1998 ITU Long Distance Triathlon World Championships was a triathlon competition held in Sado Island in Japan on September 5 1998 and organized by the International Triathlon Union, now World Triathlon. This was the first edition of the championships to take place in Asia, and the fifth edition overall.

The Elite races for men and women consisted of a 3 km (1.9 mi) swim, 136 km (85 mi) bike and 28 km (17 mi) run, longer than the standard 1.5 km swim, 40 km bike and 10 km run associated with the World Triathlon Championship Series and the Olympic Games, but shorter than the classic Ironman Triathlon event.

== Medal Summary ==
Event	Gold		Silver		Bronze	
Men	Luc Van Lierde; Belgium	5:44:06	Rob Barel; Netherlands	5:52:32	Peter Sandvang; Denmark	5:52:33
Women	Rina Bradshaw-Hill; Australia	6:32:09	Lena Wahlqvist; Sweden	6:37:50	Megumi Shigaki; Japan	6:40:41

== Results ==
The following are the results of the elite races:

=== Men ===
43 athletes began the race, with 35 completing the distance. Belgium's Luc Van Lierde was first home in 5 hrs 44 minutes and 6 seconds. The race for second involved an unusually close finish for the event, with 1994 champion Rob Barel pipping the Dane Peter Sandvang by a single second.

Rank	Athlete	Nation	Swim	T1	Bike	T2	Run	Overall time
1st place, gold medalist(s)	Luc Van Lierde	Belgium	38:54	0:24	3:20:01	0:39	1:44:08	5:44:06
2nd place, silver medalist(s)	Rob Barel	Netherlands	38:55	0:46	3:21:34	0:31	1:50:46	5:52:32
3rd place, bronze medalist(s)	Peter Sandvang	Denmark	41:22	0:31	3:19:23	0:45	1:50:32	5:52:33
4	Timothy Deboom	United States	39:00	0:48	3:24:06	1:03	1:50:07	5:55:04
5	Jason Shortis	Australia	42:12	0:40	3:24:31	0:52	1:47:28	5:55:43
6	Rolf Lautenbacher	Germany	42:24	0:52	3:25:50	0:37	1:46:51	5:56:34
7	Péter Kropkó	Hungary	40:05	1:00	3:31:39	1:19	1:43:16	5:57:19
8	Gilles Reboul	France	39:27	0:25	3:27:53	0:42	1:51:41	6:00:08
9	Xavier Galea	France	38:57	0:45	3:33:05	0:51	1:48:32	6:02:10
10	Cyrille Neveu	France	41:16	0:29	3:26:15	0:40	1:54:54	6:03:34
11	Massimo Guadagni	Italy	42:18	0:35	3:34:13	1:09	1:46:47	6:05:02
12	Felix Javier Martinez Rubio	Spain	47:48	0:53	3:30:25	0:54	1:46:26	6:06:26
13	Jamie Cleveland	Canada	41:12	0:42	3:29:53	1:07	1:54:05	6:06:59
14	Shingo Tani	Japan	42:19	0:33	3:32:31	0:28	1:51:53	6:07:44
15	Dan Dethier	Luxembourg	45:29	0:39	3:27:46	0:45	1:53:51	6:08:30
16	Bryan Rhodes	New Zealand	38:44	0:35	3:31:32	0:38	1:57:36	6:09:05
17	Torbjorn Sindballe	Denmark	42:19	0:38	3:27:35	1:00	1:58:10	6:09:42
18	Eduardo Arenal	Spain	47:48	0:57	3:37:12	0:44	1:45:11	6:11:52
19	Nobuo Kitazato	Japan	42:18	0:24	3:41:13	0:38	1:48:26	6:12:59
20	Damion Angus	Australia	42:09	0:45	3:30:30	1:17	1:58:37	6:13:18
21	Rodney Gordon	New Zealand	45:18	1:10	3:33:52	1:26	1:51:46	6:13:32
22	Allan Mansson	Denmark	39:04	0:46	3:31:55	0:53	2:02:42	6:15:20
23	Yuji Fujiwara	Japan	47:29	0:26	3:38:44	0:42	1:48:23	6:15:44
24	Francisco Zurob	Chile	42:20	0:42	3:35:41	0:35	1:59:46	6:19:04
25	Jani Tomsic	Slovenia	43:40	0:53	3:29:46	1:50	2:03:02	6:19:11
26	Alejandro Santamaria Perez	Spain	45:24	0:27	3:40:16	0:44	1:52:55	6:19:46
27	Pim Veeger	Netherlands	48:10	1:02	3:30:27	0:52	2:00:24	6:20:55
28	Rolf Kristian Roll	Norway	45:14	0:43	3:34:53	0:47	1:59:27	6:21:04
29	Yannick Bourseaux	France	41:17	0:25	3:32:12	0:52	2:06:46	6:21:32
30	Glen Gore	South Africa	38:50	0:56	3:54:12	0:42	1:46:58	6:21:38
31	Josef Neuhauser	Austria	45:22	0:50	3:33:55	0:43	2:02:42	6:23:32
32	Kazuo Sudo	Japan	42:21	0:33	3:48:41	0:27	1:56:24	6:28:26
33	Yoshinori Tamura	Japan	45:25	0:56	3:43:23	0:34	1:58:48	6:29:06
34	Mika Luoto	Finland	41:18	0:33	4:01:08	0:46	1:49:04	6:32:49
35	Georg Partlic	Austria	42:16	0:39	3:58:18	0:43	2:05:50	6:47:46
-	Simon Malo	Canada	42:18	0:54	-	-	-	DNF
-	Petr Vabrousek	Czech Republic	42:23	0:33	5:01:37	0:57	-	DNF
-	Matthew Bellfield	Great Britain	42:18	0:47	-	-	-	DNF
-	Esteban Maroni	Mexico	42:17	0:31	-	-	-	DNF
-	Jaime Chimal	Mexico	45:31	0:42	-	-	-	DNF
-	Guido Savelkoul	Netherlands	42:19	0:25	-	-	-	DNF
-	Reto Schawalder	Switzerland	42:14	1:03	3:33:51	1:08	-	DNF
-	Hideya Miyazuka	Japan	45:14	0:40	-	-	-	DNF
Key : DNF - did not finish ; DNS - did not start

=== Women ===
24 Athletes began the race, with 17 completing the journey, led home by Australia's Rita Bradshaw-Hill.

Rank	Athlete	Nation	Swim	T1	Bike	T2	Run	Overall time
1st place, gold medalist(s)	Rina Bradshaw-Hill	Australia	42:29	1:01	3:53:07	0:33	1:54:59	6:32:09
2nd place, silver medalist(s)	Lena Wahlqvist	Sweden	42:58	0:36	3:53:01	0:50	2:00:25	6:37:50
3rd place, bronze medalist(s)	Megumi Shigaki	Japan	47:38	0:40	3:54:57	0:41	1:56:45	6:40:41
4	Marijke Zeekant	Netherlands	44:09	0:39	3:51:39	0:48	2:07:17	6:44:32
5	Lisa Bentley	Canada	44:18	0:47	3:55:42	0:59	2:04:37	6:46:23
6	Agnes Eppers	Bolivia	53:34	0:38	3:56:16	1:02	2:06:20	6:57:50
7	Yoko Hori	Japan	52:16	0:37	3:56:45	0:49	2:08:38	6:59:05
8	Ann Eldegard	Norway	44:22	0:45	3:58:07	0:36	2:17:29	7:01:19
9	Kerstin Weule	United States	44:23	0:39	4:02:08	0:37	2:15:26	7:03:13
10	Noriko Yakamura	Japan	47:35	0:46	4:10:43	0:35	2:04:14	7:03:53
11	Junko Takeuchi	Japan	53:35	1:00	4:05:49	1:12	2:03:14	7:04:50
12	Veronica Roldan	Spain	44:20	0:56	4:02:18	0:51	2:19:26	7:07:51
13	Sari Rairama	Finland	47:34	0:43	4:05:44	0:53	2:14:49	7:09:43
14	Belinda Smith	Australia	47:30	0:40	3:55:04	0:33	2:26:35	7:10:22
15	Jacqueline Van Vliet	Netherlands	52:24	0:48	4:03:15	0:55	2:17:36	7:14:58
16	Kim Isherwood	Denmark	55:34	0:42	4:00:16	1:00	2:18:46	7:16:18
17	Sonja Terblanche	South Africa	53:48	1:10	4:05:09	1:05	2:23:00	7:24:12
-	Joanne King	Australia	44:10	0:44	4:00:17	0:39	-	DNF
-	Raeleigh Tennant	Australia	44:08	0:51	-	-	-	DNF
-	Julie Curwin	Canada	47:49	0:59	3:59:50	1:17	-	DNF
-	Karin Schuch	Switzerland	53:33	1:18	-	-	-	DNF
-	Chiharu Uehara	Japan	47:36	0:32	-	-	-	DNF
-	Mika Sakane	Japan	45:09	0:50	4:13:07	1:19	-	DNF
-	Stefanie Arndt	Germany	53:37	0:37	-	-	-	DNF
Key : DNF - did not finish ; DNS - did not start
