= 2002 ITU Long Distance Triathlon World Championships =

International sports competition

World Long Distance Triathlon Championships
- Location: Nice, France
- Date: September 22, 2002
- Competitors: 118 (80 men, 38 women)

Champions
- Men: Cyrille Neveu (France)
- Women: Ines Estedt (Germany)

The 2002 ITU Long Distance Triathlon World Championships was a triathlon competition held in Nice in France on September 22, 2002, and organized by the International Triathlon Union, now World Triathlon. This was the ninth edition of the competition.

The Elite races for men and women consisted of a 4 km (2.5 mi) swim, 120 km (75 mi) bike and 30 km (19 mi) run, longer than the standard 1.5 km swim, 40 km bike and 10 km run associated with the World Triathlon Championship Series and the Olympic Games, but shorter than the classic Ironman Triathlon event.

== Medal Summary ==
Event	Gold		Silver		Bronze	
Men	Cyrille Neveu; France	6:19:45	Torbjørn Sindballe; Denmark	6:22:05	Rutger Beke; Belgium	6:22:52
Women	Ines Estedt; Germany	7:06:43	Kathleen Smet; Belgium	7:11:55	Virginia Berasategi; Spain	7:14:17

== Results ==
The following are the results of the elite races:

=== Men ===
80 men took to the startline in Nice, of whom 70 completed the course. Cyrille Neveu of France won the title by just over two minutes from Dane Torbjørn Sindballe.

Rank	Athlete	Nation	Swim	T1	Bike	T2	Run	Overall time
1st place, gold medalist(s)	Cyrille Neveu	France	51:31	2:28	3:23:19	2:01	2:00:23	6:19:45
2nd place, silver medalist(s)	Torbjørn Sindballe	Denmark	52:07	2:31	3:29:54	2:17	1:55:14	6:22:05
3rd place, bronze medalist(s)	Rutger Beke	Belgium	55:05	2:16	3:29:20	1:49	1:54:20	6:22:52
4	Gilles Reboul	France	51:31	2:16	3:32:55	1:50	1:55:36	6:24:10
5	Ralf Eggert	Germany	51:31	2:10	3:30:45	1:47	1:58:43	6:24:57
6	Christoph Mauch	Switzerland	57:35	2:20	3:29:25	1:50	1:54:35	6:25:48
7	Francois Chabaud	France	54:40	2:28	3:29:31	1:46	2:00:47	6:29:14
8	Jarrod Brauer	Australia	52:31	2:17	3:29:39	1:50	2:03:31	6:29:51
9	Peter Sandvang	Denmark	52:15	2:47	3:31:40	2:23	2:00:50	6:29:58
10	Alejandro Santamaria Perez	Spain	57:44	2:24	3:35:59	1:49	1:52:13	6:30:09
11	Patrick Vernay	France	51:39	2:25	3:36:34	1:57	1:58:48	6:31:27
12	Luc Van Lierde	Belgium	51:34	2:16	3:41:23	2:02	1:55:09	6:32:26
13	Xavier Le Floch	France	52:35	2:13	3:41:18	1:53	1:56:30	6:34:29
14	Bruno Von Flue	Switzerland	57:26	2:32	3:32:23	1:42	2:01:55	6:35:59
15	Peter Melcher	Germany	57:48	2:20	3:36:04	2:16	1:58:30	6:36:59
16	Guido Gosselink	Netherlands	57:30	2:27	3:31:52	2:08	2:04:46	6:38:44
17	Philippe Achleitner	Switzerland	51:30	2:25	3:37:50	1:49	2:09:08	6:42:44
18	Lino Barruncho	Portugal	1:01:54	3:11	3:40:07	2:09	1:55:28	6:42:52
19	Jan Vodehnal	Czech Republic	57:57	2:25	3:42:40	1:46	1:58:35	6:43:24
20	Norbert Langbrandtner	Austria	57:49	2:37	3:35:45	2:00	2:05:42	6:43:55
21	Nick Marland	Australia	51:36	2:21	3:37:16	2:04	2:11:13	6:44:33
22	Christoph Hamard	France	54:36	2:35	3:42:22	2:17	2:03:14	6:45:04
23	Jordi Calduch Prat	Spain	57:33	2:43	3:46:01	2:09	1:57:30	6:45:56
24	Gianpietro De Faveri	Italy	51:30	2:36	3:33:40	2:40	2:15:39	6:46:06
25	Christoph Bergmann	Germany	55:08	2:27	3:46:45	2:10	2:00:06	6:46:38
26	Petr Vabrousek	Czech Republic	57:57	2:37	3:43:16	2:16	2:01:08	6:47:17
27	Fergus MacLean	Great Britain	51:43	2:32	3:45:36	2:19	2:05:15	6:47:24
28	Matthias Heim	Germany	1:01:29	2:59	3:37:06	2:20	2:06:19	6:50:16
29	Diego Gazzari	Italy	55:03	2:36	3:41:55	2:32	2:08:28	6:50:36
30	Koen Hoeyberghs	Belgium	54:58	2:20	3:41:04	2:27	2:11:50	6:52:41
31	Heiko Tewes	Germany	55:06	2:32	3:38:31	2:09	2:15:00	6:53:20
32	Simon Finch	South Africa	55:07	2:52	3:40:29	2:06	2:13:01	6:53:38
33	Michael Lovato	United States	58:03	3:00	3:36:39	2:41	2:13:27	6:53:54
34	Juan Izquierdo	Spain	55:08	2:48	3:50:46	2:05	2:03:45	6:54:34
35	Morten Fenger	Denmark	1:04:05	3:03	3:38:27	2:40	2:06:39	6:54:54
36	Werner Leitner	Austria	57:33	2:20	3:45:21	2:02	2:07:51	6:55:10
37	Bjorn Andersson	Sweden	51:27	2:27	3:30:18	2:15	2:29:14	6:55:42
38	Hiroyuki Nishiuchi	Japan	51:39	2:25	3:57:30	1:42	2:04:14	6:57:33
39	Thierry Claes	Belgium	1:01:16	2:56	3:42:05	2:08	2:09:45	6:58:12
40	Jari Vuorinen	Finland	1:03:46	2:39	3:43:07	2:15	2:06:32	6:58:22
41	Gael Mainard	France	51:36	2:36	3:42:15	2:16	2:19:47	6:58:32
42	Marco Marchese	Italy	55:05	2:16	3:42:18	2:09	2:16:48	6:58:39
43	Bent Andersen	Denmark	57:44	2:31	3:54:46	2:40	2:01:06	6:58:47
44	Martin Soliva	Switzerland	1:03:51	3:23	3:38:27	2:21	2:11:09	6:59:14
45	Margus Tamm	Estonia	1:02:05	2:52	3:43:43	2:12	2:09:08	7:00:00
46	Erih Pecnik	Slovenia	55:10	2:25	3:48:03	2:05	2:13:40	7:01:26
47	Eric Bean	United States	59:09	2:23	3:42:50	2:40	2:14:37	7:01:41
48	Dan Dethier	Luxembourg	1:02:18	2:58	3:38:32	2:41	2:16:43	7:03:14
49	Tamas Petr	Czech Republic	55:11	3:03	3:49:39	2:05	2:15:27	7:05:29
50	Fernando Marian De Diego	Spain	52:23	2:50	3:55:48	2:13	2:13:16	7:06:31
51	Kai Soderdahl	Finland	1:04:01	2:47	3:51:27	2:15	2:06:10	7:06:41
52	Marco Stradi	Italy	57:47	2:51	3:53:08	2:27	2:13:39	7:09:52
53	Gerrit Depauw	Belgium	55:03	2:28	3:56:52	2:32	2:13:21	7:10:17
54	Cecilio Perez	Spain	59:41	2:32	3:52:48	2:27	2:14:38	7:12:09
55	Pavel Kasparek	Czech Republic	57:49	3:14	3:54:00	2:28	2:14:52	7:12:26
56	Norbert Huber	Germany	1:10:11	2:47	3:46:16	2:37	2:11:24	7:13:18
57	Federico Girasole	Italy	1:01:28	3:04	3:41:48	2:28	2:25:33	7:14:24
58	Tim Christmann	Germany	58:35	2:50	3:55:38	2:17	2:17:38	7:16:59
59	Clive Chowles	South Africa	58:02	3:29	3:51:17	2:59	2:23:34	7:19:22
60	Bevan Leach	Australia	55:07	2:37	3:53:47	2:04	2:26:59	7:20:37
61	Dejan Patrcevic	Croatia	59:06	2:43	3:53:13	2:25	2:23:19	7:20:47
62	Lukas Vrobel	Czech Republic	55:10	2:55	4:19:39	2:16	2:08:28	7:28:31
63	Eoin O'connell	Ireland	1:12:38	2:41	4:02:08	3:13	2:10:11	7:30:51
64	Carl Storm	South Africa	51:34	2:12	3:51:59	3:23	2:46:39	7:35:50
65	Masayuki Matsumaru	Japan	1:01:08	2:50	3:59:58	3:02	2:32:42	7:39:39
66	Roberto De Lemos	Brazil	1:01:12	2:37	4:08:01	3:50	2:26:44	7:42:28
67	Kerim Jacaman	United States	1:06:10	2:59	3:58:29	3:03	2:36:36	7:47:20
68	John Koenig	United States	57:49	3:15	3:45:16	2:33	2:59:25	7:48:22
69	Andy Blow	Great Britain	1:02:05	2:37	3:56:17	3:07	2:56:45	8:00:53
70	Jalel Somrani	France	1:18:56	2:41	4:26:31	2:43	2:22:03	8:12:57
-	Ricardo Costa	Portugal	1:01:20	-	4:01:48	-	-	DNF
-	Kevin Palmer	United States	1:08:01	-	4:29:43	-	-	DNF
-	Frederic Kohl	Austria	55:06	-	3:30:16	-	-	DNF
-	Mike Prince	Great Britain	1:04:15	-	4:02:35	-	-	DNF
-	Stefano Paoli	Italy	55:08	-	4:07:44	-	-	DNF
-	Vincent Bruins	Netherlands	1:01:30	-	3:35:25	-	-	DNF
-	Damdah Zepic	Slovenia	57:50	-	4:05:01	-	-	DNF
-	Marino Vanhoenacker	Belgium	55:08	-	3:38:46	-	-	DNF
-	Lawrence Oldershaw	Great Britain	1:04:43	-	-	-	-	DNF
-	Casper Van Den Burgh	Netherlands	52:52	-	-	-	-	DNF
-	Felix Javier Martinez Rubio	Spain	1:01:50	-	-	-	-	DNF
-	Reto Walser	Switzerland	-					DNS
-	Andrey Begen	Ukraine	-					DNS
-	Ihor Ishchuk	Ukraine	-					DNS
-	Andriy Yastrebov	Ukraine	-					DNS
-	Viktor Zemtsev	Ukraine	-					DNS
Key : DNF - did not finish ; DNS - did not start

=== Women ===
38 women began the race, of whom 32 completed the course. Germany's Ines Estedt was the comfortable winner, beating second placed Belgian Kathleen Smet by over five minutes.

Rank	Athlete	Nation	Swim	T1	Bike	T2	Run	Overall time
1st place, gold medalist(s)	Ines Estedt	Germany	58:18	2:40	3:51:17	2:04	2:12:22	7:06:43
2nd place, silver medalist(s)	Kathleen Smet	Belgium	56:26	2:36	3:57:28	2:37	2:12:45	7:11:55
3rd place, bronze medalist(s)	Virginia Berasategi	Spain	58:20	2:43	3:55:31	2:12	2:15:29	7:14:17
4	Susan Williams	United States	56:27	2:47	3:56:36	2:13	2:24:29	7:22:33
5	Sophie Delemer	France	1:01:41	2:47	3:48:50	2:09	2:27:16	7:22:45
6	Beth Thomson	Great Britain	55:11	2:29	4:00:35	2:05	2:23:19	7:23:42
7	Edith Niederfriniger	Italy	59:45	2:40	4:10:36	2:01	2:13:21	7:28:24
8	Sione Jongstra	Netherlands	1:02:41	2:44	3:59:19	2:33	2:25:06	7:32:27
9	Ariane Gutknecht	Switzerland	1:04:57	2:51	4:03:32	2:23	2:19:37	7:33:21
10	Gabriela Loskotova	Czech Republic	1:05:31	3:10	4:11:52	4:28	2:15:21	7:40:23
11	Audrey Cleau	France	1:07:21	3:07	4:07:37	2:08	2:22:06	7:42:21
12	Merja Kiviranta	Finland	1:07:13	2:47	4:02:15	1:46	2:28:44	7:42:46
13	Heidi Sessner	Germany	1:02:37	2:47	4:15:16	2:13	2:20:12	7:43:07
14	Julie Hansen Bollerup	Denmark	1:07:37	2:56	4:04:52	2:20	2:26:05	7:43:52
15	Silvia Vaupel	Germany	1:04:06	3:02	4:08:18	2:09	2:26:49	7:44:24
16	Dominique Donner	South Africa	55:12	3:57	4:07:25	2:12	2:37:02	7:45:50
17	Paula Adams	Great Britain	1:07:26	3:17	4:04:40	2:24	2:29:01	7:46:48
18	Manuela Ianesi	Italy	56:24	2:39	4:10:06	2:29	2:36:31	7:48:09
19	Claudia Hille	Germany	1:16:04	3:23	4:08:11	2:05	2:19:16	7:49:03
20	Ann Eldegard	Norway	1:00:45	2:58	4:11:52	2:32	2:32:52	7:51:01
21	Marijke Zeekant	Netherlands	1:00:41	2:47	4:12:09	2:59	2:35:15	7:53:51
22	Kerstin Lohmeyer	Germany	1:02:06	3:23	4:12:17	2:28	2:34:23	7:54:40
23	Cristina Azanza Moreno	Spain	1:04:25	3:17	4:23:32	2:48	2:21:44	7:55:48
24	Karen Holloway	United States	1:01:56	3:18	4:10:51	2:33	2:37:25	7:56:06
25	Catherine Houseaux	France	1:14:29	4:19	4:14:10	4:05	2:23:29	8:00:35
26	Kelly Rees	United States	1:12:51	2:43	4:14:00	2:25	2:28:56	8:00:58
27	Lie De Schrijver	Belgium	1:02:27	2:46	4:16:54	2:41	2:41:03	8:05:54
28	Katia Ruschel	Brazil	1:02:13	3:11	4:39:12	2:51	2:30:22	8:17:49
29	Estelle Patou	France	1:03:35	2:55	3:58:19	3:02	3:16:46	8:24:37
30	Rie Hirose	Japan	1:07:34	3:22	4:30:09	2:12	2:47:02	8:30:20
31	Michelle Deasy	United States	1:01:54	3:03	4:19:33	2:47	3:13:00	8:40:19
32	Robyn Roocke	Australia	1:05:30	2:56	4:31:35	2:35	3:31:17	9:13:57
-	Hana Rulfova	Czech Republic	1:11:51	-	4:43:29	-	-	DNF
-	Daniela Preukschat	Germany	1:13:00	-	4:54:56	-	-	DNF
-	Monika Altenreiter	Austria	59:44	-	4:18:17	-	-	DNF
-	Daniela Locarno	Italy	1:02:07	-	4:01:58	-	-	DNF
-	Helene Salomon-Watson	France	1:05:05	-	-	-	-	DNF
-	Annie Emmerson	Great Britain	1:02:34	-	-	-	-	DNF
-	Lisbeth Kristensen	Denmark	-					DNS
-	Lisa Rowbottom	Great Britain	-					DNS
-	Martina Dogana	Italy	-					DNS
Key : DNF - did not finish ; DNS - did not start
