= 2000 ITU Long Distance Triathlon World Championships =

International sports competition

World Long Distance Triathlon Championships
- Location: Nice, France
- Date: June 18, 2000
- Competitors: 108 (75 men, 33 women)

Champions
- Men: Peter Sandvang (Denmark)
- Women: Isabelle Mouthon-Michellys (France)

The 2000 ITU Long Distance Triathlon World Championships was a triathlon competition held in Nice in France on June 18, 2000, and organized by the International Triathlon Union, now World Triathlon. This was the eighth edition of the competition.

The Elite races for men and women consisted of a 4 km (2.5 mi) swim, 120 km (75 mi) bike and 30 km (19 mi) run, longer than the standard 1.5 km swim, 40 km bike and 10 km run associated with the World Triathlon Championship Series and the Olympic Games, but shorter than the classic Ironman Triathlon event.

For the first time, a team competition was also held for nations with three or more athletes in each race, in addition to a series of age-group championships.

== Medal Summary ==
Event	Gold		Silver		Bronze	
Men	Peter Sandvang; Denmark	6:22:01	Cyrille Neveu; France	6:23:17	Francois Chabaud; France	6:26:49
Men's team	France; Cyrille Neveu; Francois Chabaud; Gilles Reboul	19:37:44	Denmark; Peter Sandvang; Torbjorn Sindballe; Allan Mansson	19:39:45	Switzerland; Christoph Mauch; Bruno Von Flue; Konrad Von Allmen	19:58:36
Women	Isabelle Mouthon-Michellys; France	7:04:48	Natascha Badmann; Switzerland	7:05:44	Daniela Locarno; Italy	7:11:42
Women's team	France; Isabelle Mouthon-Michellys; Helene Salomon-Watson; Cedrine Soulet	21:44:51	Netherlands; Bianca Van Dijk; Marijke Zeekant; Cora Vlot	22:30:22	Two entrants only	

== Results ==
The following are the results of the elite races:

=== Men ===
Individual

75 men began the race, of which 67 completed the course. Peter Sandvang of Denmark retained his title from the previous year.

Rank	Athlete	Nation	Swim	T1	Bike	T2	Run	Overall time
1st place, gold medalist(s)	Peter Sandvang	Denmark	52:55	1:58	3:31:36	2:10	1:53:22	6:22:01
2nd place, silver medalist(s)	Cyrille Neveu	France	52:43	2:11	3:31:34	1:48	1:55:01	6:23:17
3rd place, bronze medalist(s)	Francois Chabaud	France	53:59	1:39	3:38:11	2:09	1:50:51	6:26:49
4	Gilles Reboul	France	50:37	4:17	3:38:54	2:02	1:51:48	6:27:38
5	Philippe Lie	France	54:00	2:12	3:37:36	2:06	1:53:04	6:28:58
6	Christoph Mauch	Switzerland	56:43	1:50	3:35:17	1:59	1:54:18	6:30:07
7	Peter Clode	New Zealand	53:29	2:24	3:38:31	2:23	1:54:30	6:31:17
8	Cameron Widoff	United States	53:53	1:53	3:42:48	2:15	1:50:41	6:31:30
9	Felix Javier Martinez Rubio	Spain	59:58	1:43	3:39:28	2:24	1:48:39	6:32:12
10	Torbjorn Sindballe	Denmark	53:05	1:50	3:38:57	2:25	1:58:06	6:34:23
11	Frank Heldoorn	Netherlands	53:54	1:58	3:42:38	2:10	1:54:20	6:35:00
12	Jarrod Brauer	Australia	53:53	1:49	3:33:47	2:38	2:03:30	6:35:07
13	Bruno Von Flue	Switzerland	58:36	2:30	3:32:18	2:30	2:01:40	6:35:17
14	Laurent Jeanselme	France	46:21	1:57	3:38:49	2:23	2:05:56	6:35:26
15	Cameron Brown	New Zealand	54:03	1:58	3:45:12	1:56	1:55:20	6:38:29
16	Jan Van Der Marel	Netherlands	59:33	1:53	3:39:39	2:02	1:56:19	6:39:26
17	Gerrit Schellens	Belgium	58:04	2:06	3:47:29	2:09	1:50:27	6:40:15
18	Petr Vabrousek	Czech Republic	56:55	2:26	3:44:05	2:15	1:56:00	6:41:41
19	Xavier Galea	France	50:37	4:14	3:39:01	2:09	2:06:59	6:43:00
20	Allan Mansson	Denmark	50:18	2:11	3:41:14	2:26	2:07:12	6:43:21
21	Per Nilsson	Denmark	57:02	2:26	3:41:37	2:37	2:01:33	6:45:15
22	Dan Dethier	Luxembourg	57:22	2:20	3:41:30	2:29	2:02:14	6:45:55
23	Alexander Frühwirth	Austria	54:22	2:00	3:51:24	1:56	1:56:55	6:46:37
24	Tero Hyppoelae	Finland	53:05	1:49	3:51:26	2:09	1:59:58	6:48:27
25	Michal Pilousek	Czech Republic	53:50	1:35	3:43:04	2:18	2:08:09	6:48:56
26	Marco Marchese	Italy	50:19	2:02	3:42:41	2:11	2:11:43	6:48:57
27	Guido Gosselink	Netherlands	54:09	2:03	3:44:55	2:27	2:05:39	6:49:13
28	Nicola Carpenese	Italy	53:57	2:01	3:48:37	2:24	2:02:43	6:49:42
29	Jan Strangmuller	Czech Republic	56:59	2:41	3:44:02	2:42	2:04:10	6:50:34
30	Alain Vervoort	Belgium	56:03	1:59	3:48:48	1:56	2:02:43	6:51:29
31	Federico Girasole	Italy	59:42	2:16	3:45:58	2:39	2:01:17	6:51:52
32	Asier Bilbao Goikoetxea	Spain	53:18	1:50	3:39:52	2:49	2:14:30	6:52:19
33	Konrad Von Allmen	Switzerland	1:02:04	2:29	3:53:58	2:16	1:52:25	6:53:12
34	Martin Soliva	Switzerland	57:12	2:16	3:46:47	2:23	2:05:23	6:54:01
35	Eric Dean	United States	55:48	2:04	3:46:32	2:13	2:06:15	6:54:52
36	Hubert Hammerl	Austria	56:28	2:32	3:47:20	2:17	2:07:35	6:56:12
37	Ryan James	Great Britain	59:02	2:24	3:46:33	2:55	2:05:19	6:56:13
38	Alexandre Guerin	France	50:13	1:57	3:43:19	2:16	2:19:37	6:57:22
39	Sergey Badanin	Russia	52:54	2:15	3:52:44	2:08	2:07:32	6:57:33
40	Lawrence Oldershaw	Great Britain	1:02:56	2:27	3:56:56	2:21	1:55:06	6:59:06
41	Shingo Tani	Japan	54:10	3:02	3:57:55	2:28	2:01:48	6:59:23
42	Martin Sturla	Argentina	57:31	2:35	3:56:19	2:19	2:00:52	6:59:36
43	Timothy Watson	United States	54:01	2:14	3:48:45	2:57	2:13:08	7:01:05
44	Albuin Schwarz	Austria	57:14	2:30	3:48:17	2:12	2:11:05	7:01:18
45	Jaroslav Hyzl	Czech Republic	54:16	2:01	3:50:10	2:33	2:13:41	7:02:41
46	Kirk Framke	United States	54:19	2:15	3:49:48	2:18	2:15:30	7:04:10
47	Ondrej Exner	Czech Republic	55:41	2:36	3:57:12	2:23	2:06:19	7:04:11
48	Jani Tomsic	Slovenia	55:18	2:03	3:50:56	3:15	2:12:40	7:04:12
49	Alfredo Tutor Garcia	Spain	1:02:01	2:41	3:53:45	2:19	2:04:12	7:04:58
50	Pierre-Alain Burgdorfer	Switzerland	1:15:39	2:54	3:47:43	3:04	2:00:58	7:10:18
51	Simon Jensen	Denmark	1:01:32	2:44	3:50:35	3:10	2:12:54	7:10:55
52	Christoph Hamard	France	54:47	1:58	3:51:07	2:15	2:21:57	7:12:04
53	Kevin Joyce	United States	52:52	2:09	3:56:59	2:49	2:17:26	7:12:15
54	Filip Kristl	Slovakia	52:59	2:15	4:00:13	2:04	2:16:11	7:13:42
55	Tamas Petr	Czech Republic	54:20	2:09	3:51:30	2:50	2:24:31	7:15:20
56	Deon Swart	South Africa	59:51	2:15	3:53:32	2:36	2:14:37	7:17:51
57	Eric Blais	Canada	57:41	2:20	4:02:30	3:21	2:17:02	7:22:54
58	Michal Adamec	Czech Republic	54:02	2:28	4:05:22	3:44	2:27:38	7:33:14
59	Julian Jenkinson	Great Britain	54:07	2:06	3:57:19	3:03	2:36:51	7:33:26
60	Philippe Bertrand	Canada	57:20	2:00	4:09:44	2:44	2:33:24	7:45:12
61	Tsubasa Morita	Japan	1:03:26	2:34	3:55:59	2:50	2:41:45	7:46:34
62	Peter Taylor	Great Britain	57:22	2:45	3:54:21	3:00	2:51:32	7:49:00
63	Jean-Paul Scorsolio	Monaco	1:22:55	4:03	4:12:45	3:05	2:24:20	8:07:08
64	Pierre Lorenzi	Monaco	1:16:21	3:50	4:07:48	4:59	2:47:36	8:20:34
65	Alessandro Vannacci	Italy	55:55	2:31	3:55:37	7:15	3:20:11	8:21:29
66	Paulo Pereira	Portugal	58:35	3:28	4:04:48	3:21	3:15:04	8:25:16
67	Trond Magne Hegglund	Norway	1:02:41	2:46	4:33:31	3:01	2:47:44	8:29:43
-	Johnny Pedersen	Denmark	54:48	2:13	3:47:59	3:38	-	DNF
-	Nick Marland	Australia	53:57	2:07	-	-	-	DNF
-	Stephen Sheldrake	New Zealand	49:23	1:54	-	-	-	DNF
-	Andrew Vane	New Zealand	54:48	2:18	-	-	-	DNF
-	Hektor Llanos Burguera	Spain	52:45	2:15	4:09:08	-	-	DNF
-	Bjorn Andersson	Sweden	50:36	2:23	-	-	-	DNF
-	Robert Schelin	Sweden	1:01:43	2:08	4:03:56	-	-	DNF
-	Andy Kelsey	United States	50:24	1:40	3:54:27	-	-	DNF
Key : DNF - did not finish ; DNS - did not start

Team

Eleven teams entered three athletes.

Rank	Nation	Athlete	Individual tme	Total time
1st place, gold medalist(s)	France	Cyrille Neveu	6:23:17	19:37:44
1st place, gold medalist(s)	France	Francois Chabaud	6:26:49	19:37:44
1st place, gold medalist(s)	France	Gilles Reboul	6:27:38	19:37:44
2nd place, silver medalist(s)	Denmark	Peter Sandvang	6:22:01	19:39:45
2nd place, silver medalist(s)	Denmark	Torbjorn Sindballe	6:34:23	19:39:45
2nd place, silver medalist(s)	Denmark	Allan Mansson	6:43:21	19:39:45
3rd place, bronze medalist(s)	Switzerland	Christoph Mauch	6:30:07	19:58:36
3rd place, bronze medalist(s)	Switzerland	Bruno Von Flue	6:35:17	19:58:36
3rd place, bronze medalist(s)	Switzerland	Konrad Von Allmen	6:53:12	19:58:36
4	Netherlands	Frank Heldoorn	6:35:00	20:01:39
4	Netherlands	Jan Van Der Marel	6:39:26	20:01:39
4	Netherlands	Guido Gosselink	6:49:13	20:01:39
5	Czech Republic	Petr Vabrousek	6:41:41	20:21:11
5	Czech Republic	Michal Pilousek	6:48:56	20:21:11
5	Czech Republic	Jan Strangmuller	6:50:34	20:21:11
6	United States	Cameron Widoff	6:31:30	20:27:27
6	United States	Eric Dean	6:54:52	20:27:27
6	United States	Timothy Watson	7:01:05	20:27:27
7	Spain	Felix Javier Martinez Rubio	6:32:12	20:29:29
7	Spain	Asier Bilbao Goikoetxea	6:52:19	20:29:29
7	Spain	Alfredo Tutor Garcia	7:04:58	20:29:29
8	Italy	Marco Marchese	6:48:57	20:30:31
8	Italy	Nicola Carpenese	6:49:42	20:30:31
8	Italy	Federico Girasole	6:51:52	20:30:31
9	Austria	Alexander Frühwirth	6:46:37	20:44:07
9	Austria	Hubert Hammerl	6:56:12	20:44:07
9	Austria	Albuin Schwarz	7:01:18	20:44:07
10	Great Britain	Ryan James	6:56:13	21:28:45
10	Great Britain	Lawrence Oldershaw	6:59:06	21:28:45
10	Great Britain	Julian Jenkinson	7:33:26	21:28:45
11	Czech Republic	Ondrej Exner	7:04:11	21:52:45
11	Czech Republic	Tamas Petr	7:15:20	21:52:45
11	Czech Republic	Michal Adamec	7:33:14	21:52:45

=== Women ===
Individual

33 Athletes began the race, of which 29 finished the course, led by the French triathlete Isabelle Mouthon-Michellys

Rank	Athlete	Nation	Swim	T1	Bike	T2	Run	Overall time
1st place, gold medalist(s)	Isabelle Mouthon-Michellys	France	54:14	2:00	4:02:28	2:12	2:03:52	7:04:48
2nd place, silver medalist(s)	Natascha Badmann	Switzerland	1:01:25	2:54	3:51:10	2:28	2:07:47	7:05:44
3rd place, bronze medalist(s)	Daniela Locarno	Italy	1:00:55	2:33	3:55:21	2:43	2:10:10	7:11:42
4	Suzanne Nielsen	Denmark	53:01	3:10	4:03:21	2:00	2:12:45	7:14:17
5	Helene Salomon-Watson	France	58:58	1:53	4:01:41	2:17	2:10:30	7:15:23
6	Bianca Van Dijk	Netherlands	1:02:09	3:07	4:03:39	2:40	2:09:39	7:21:19
7	Helene Purdy	Great Britain	1:04:20	2:16	4:07:42	2:50	2:05:52	7:23:02
8	Heidi Sessner	Germany	1:02:21	2:10	4:05:04	2:16	2:11:54	7:23:49
9	Cedrine Soulet	France	1:00:04	2:25	4:07:05	3:18	2:11:46	7:24:40
10	Estelle Patou	France	59:33	2:16	4:06:55	3:18	2:16:02	7:28:07
11	Virginie Blondeel	France	57:25	2:19	4:10:26	3:03	2:15:17	7:28:31
12	Marijke Zeekant	Netherlands	58:59	2:13	4:08:23	2:59	2:17:16	7:29:54
13	Lena Wahlqvist	Sweden	58:22	2:01	4:15:43	2:43	2:12:18	7:31:10
14	Edith Niederfriniger	Italy	58:32	2:21	4:17:28	2:21	2:11:37	7:32:24
15	Dolly Ginter	United States	1:03:52	2:55	4:10:48	3:02	2:11:51	7:32:29
16	Isabelle Gagnon	Canada	59:46	2:59	4:15:21	2:46	2:16:43	7:37:36
17	Cora Vlot	Netherlands	1:06:14	2:46	4:09:37	3:03	2:17:38	7:39:19
18	Alison Hayden	United States	58:38	2:24	4:20:35	2:35	2:17:55	7:42:09
19	Agnes Eppers	Bolivia	1:13:07	2:16	4:02:06	2:36	2:22:50	7:42:58
20	Nataliya Sushkova	Russia	58:33	2:46	4:08:19	7:40	2:28:29	7:45:49
21	Liliane Lafforgue	France	1:12:03	2:25	4:16:42	3:34	2:14:17	7:49:03
22	Ann Eldegard	Norway	58:27	2:13	4:18:23	3:04	2:27:21	7:49:30
23	Joanne Kay	Canada	1:13:32	3:09	4:17:02	2:46	2:16:43	7:53:13
24	Cristina Azanza Moreno	Spain	1:04:33	3:03	4:17:38	3:37	2:25:11	7:54:03
25	Kim Beckinsale	Australia	1:02:22	3:03	4:28:12	3:03	2:25:28	8:02:11
26	Chiharu Chiba	Japan	59:37	2:28	4:37:19	2:43	2:21:26	8:03:37
27	Caroline Koll	South Africa	1:02:44	2:29	4:35:29	3:10	2:35:46	8:19:40
28	Nicole Rayson	Hong Kong	1:01:36	2:32	4:41:39	5:10	2:32:08	8:23:08
29	Teresa Benet Graupera	Spain	1:16:44	3:14	4:40:40	4:01	3:00:12	9:04:54
-	Mieke Suys	Belgium	-	-	-	-	-	DNF
-	Riikka Vreeswijk-Kelja	Finland	1:01:30	3:22	-	-	-	DNF
-	Katja Schumacher	Germany	59:31	2:20	-	-	-	DNF
-	Dolorita Gerber	Switzerland	1:00:02	2:27	4:08:40	-	-	DNF
Key : DNF - did not finish ; DNS - did not start

Team

Two teams entered three athletes.

Rank	Nation	Athlete	Individual time	Total time
1st place, gold medalist(s)	France	Isabelle Mouthon-Michellys	7:04:48	21:44:51
1st place, gold medalist(s)	France	Helene Salomon-Watson	7:15:23	21:44:51
1st place, gold medalist(s)	France	Cedrine Soulet	7:24:40	21:44:51
2nd place, silver medalist(s)	Netherlands	Bianca Van Dijk	7:21:19	22:30:32
2nd place, silver medalist(s)	Netherlands	Marijke Zeekant	7:29:54	22:30:32
2nd place, silver medalist(s)	Netherlands	Cora Vlot	7:39:19	22:30:32

== Age group ==
A series of amateur age-group championships were held as part of the event. The winners in each of the events is listed below.

Age group	Male			Female		
Age group	Athlete	Nation	Time	Athlete	Nation	Time
20-24	Chris Volley	Great Britain	7:04:36	Gaby Von Arx	Switzerland	8:11:58
25-29	Jason Chalker	Australia	6:58:10	Lucia Kuhner	Germany	7:53:24
30-34	Eric Ridez	France	6:46:44	Florence Crowet	Belgium	7:35:48
35-39	Steffen Hartig	Germany	6:50:12	Francoise Wellekens	Belgium	7:40:18
40-44	Rodolphe Von Berg	Belgium	6:59:10	Monika Birk	Germany	8:18:03
45-49	Kalli Nottrodt	Germany	7:10:29	Hilma Schindling	Germany	8:30:58
50-54	Daniel Schori	Switzerland	7:38:11	Terese Van Lare	Netherlands	8:48:02
55-59	Peter Schindling	Germany	7:38:43	Natasha Abels	Great Britain	9:22:08
60-64	Richard Clark	United States	8:30:13	—N/a		
65-69	Antonio Tellarini	Italy	10:53:26	—N/a		
