= Kortelainen =

Kortelainen is a Finnish surname, most prevalent in Finland and Sweden. Notable people with the surname include:

- Anna Kortelainen (born 1968), Finnish scholar
- Jorma Kortelainen (1932–2012), Finnish cross-country skier
- Jouni Kortelainen (born 1957), Finnish long-distance runner
