= Bruce Thomas =

Bruce Thomas may refer to:

- Bruce Thomas (musician) (born 1948)
- Bruce Thomas (actor) (born 1961)
- Bruce Thomas (cricketer) (born 1942)
