= Kathleen Smet =

Belgian triathlete

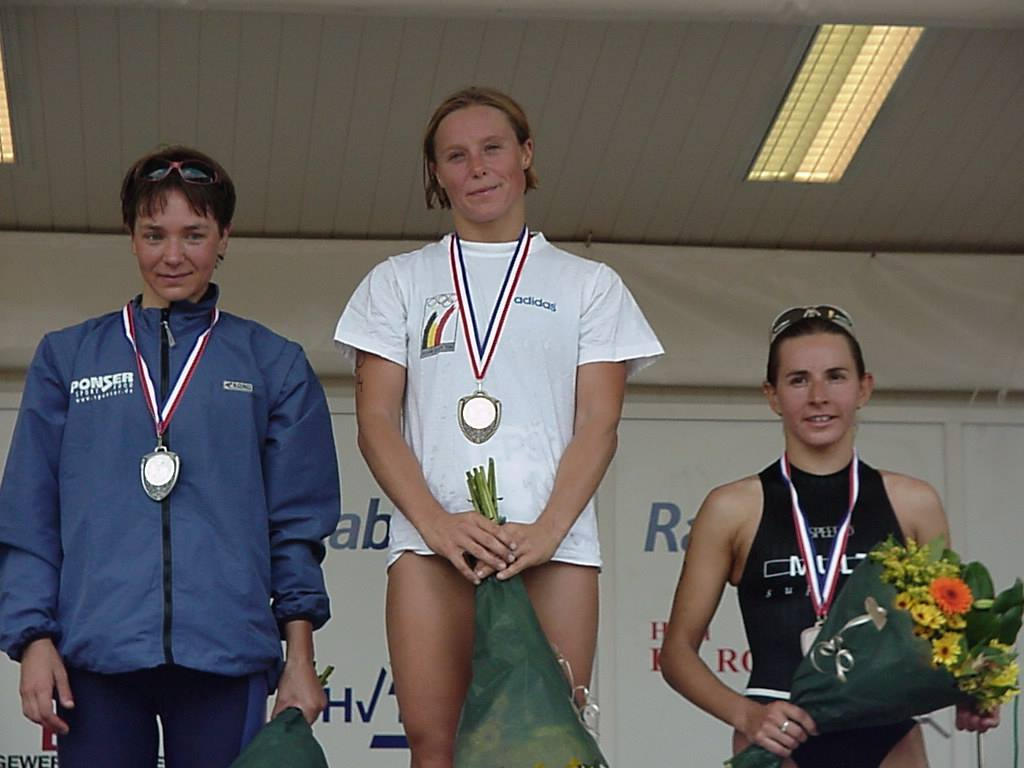
- Smet (centre) in 2000, after winning the Zundert triathlon

Personal information
- Born: 19 January 1970 (age 56)

Sport
- Country: Belgium
Medal record
Representing Belgium
Women's triathlon
ITU Long Distance World Championships
Gold medal – first place	2005 Fredericia	Individual
Silver medal – second place	2002 Nice	Individual
European Triathlon Championships
Gold medal – first place	2000 Stein	Individual
Gold medal – first place	2002 Győr	Individual
Silver medal – second place	2001 Karlovy Vary	Individual
Bronze medal – third place	2003 Karlovy Vary	Individual

Kathleen Smet (born 19 January 1970, in Beveren) is a Belgian former triathlete, becoming European champion in 2000 and 2002. She competed in Olympic and Long Distance Triathlons.

Smet competed at the first Olympic triathlon at the 2000 Summer Olympics. She took sixteenth place with a total time of 2:04:05.98. Four years later, Smet again raced in the triathlon. This time, she placed fourth with a total time of 2:05:39.89.

In 2005, Smet won the gold medal at the World Championships and retired from the sport. She ended her career by receiving the "Flemish Sportswoman of the Year" trophy during a ceremony at the Kaaitheater in Brussels, in recognition of her career and her final title. She worked for several years as a sports coordinator within the Belgian Triathlon League before resigning due to relational issues with the management and becoming a swimming instructor at the University of Leuven.
