= Bruce Thomas (cricketer) =

Australian cricketer (born 1942)

Personal information
- Full name: Kenneth Bruce Thomas
- Born: 5 October 1942 (age 84); Melbourne, Australia
- Batting: Right-handed
- Bowling: Right-arm leg-spin

Domestic team information
- Years: Team
- 1966-1970: Victoria

Career statistics
Competition	First-class
Matches	13
Runs scored	544
Batting average	25.90
100s/50s	0/3
Top score	66
Balls bowled	587
Wickets	7
Bowling average	42.42
5 wickets in innings	0
10 wickets in match	0
Best bowling	3/88
Catches/stumpings	10/–
- Source: Cricinfo, 19 November 2023

Kenneth Bruce Thomas (born 5 October 1942) is an Australian former cricketer. He played 13 first-class cricket matches for Victoria between 1966 and 1970.

Thomas was a right-handed opening batsman and occasional leg-spin bowler. His best season was 1966–67, when he scored 421 runs at an average of 38.27 to help Victoria win the Sheffield Shield. He made his highest score of 66 against Queensland in 1968–69, when he and Ken Eastwood put on 131 for the opening partnership.

Thomas played district cricket in the Victorian Cricket Association for Hawthorn-East Melbourne from 1961–62 to 1978–79. The annual batting prize for its successor club, Kingston Hawthorn, is the Bruce Thomas Trophy.
