= Paul White =

Paul White may refer to:

- Paul Dudley White (1886–1973), American cardiologist
- Paul Frederick White (born before 1970), American anesthesiologist
- Paul White (journalist) (1902–1955), American journalist, news director of CBS during WWII
- Paul White (missionary) (1910–1992), Australian missionary, evangelist, radio program host and author, the "Jungle Doctor"
- Paul White (American football, born 1921) (1921–1974), American football player
- Paul White (American football, born 1948) (1948–2001), American football player
- Paul White, Baron Hanningfield (1940–2024), British politician and farmer
- Paul White (rugby league) (born 1982), Jamaican rugby league player
- Paul White (record producer) (active from 2007), British electro and hiphop producer and musician
- Paul White (bishop) (born 1949), bishop in the Anglican Diocese of Melbourne
- Paul White (Australian footballer) (1893–1973), Australian rules footballer
- Paul White (racing driver) (born 1963), American racing driver
- W. Paul White (born 1945), American politician in Massachusetts
- Paul White, drummer for British metal band The Defiled (active from 2005)

== See also ==
- Paul Wight, professional wrestler, known by his ring names "The Big Show" and "The Giant"
