= Per Nilsson =

Per Nilsson may refer to:

- Per Nilsson (gymnast) (1890–1964), Swedish gymnast
- Per Nilsson (footballer) (born 1982), Swedish football (soccer) player
- Per Nilsson (guitarist) in the bands Scar Symmetry and Kaipa
- Per Nilsson (writer) (born 1954), Swedish writer

== See also ==
- Per Nielsen, Danish football (soccer) player
