= Dejan Patrčević =

Personal information
- Full name: Dejan Patrčević
- Nickname: Anakin
- Born: November 2, 1975 (age 50) Zagreb, Croatia
- Height: 1.85 m (6 ft 1 in)
- Weight: 72 kg (159 lb)
- Other interests: architecture

Sport
- Country: Croatia
- Club: Adriatic Coaching
- Team: Triathlon Team Croatia

Dejan Patrčević (born November 2, 1975, in Zagreb) is a Croatian PRO triathlete with notable success in ITU World Triathlon Cup and Ironman series. Dejan Patrčević held the Croatian Ironman Record (8:12:18) for more than 13 years and has placed 23rd in Ironman World Championship 2008 what is the best ever achievement of one long distance Croatian triathlete at Ironman World Championship.

Dejan wins 2016 Wings for Life World Run race in Zadar with a distance of 56 km.

== Results ==
Below table includes major results in the period of 2002–2011. Dejan Patrcevic is still participating in the triathlon races, and additional results are visible on the ITU Dejan Patrcevic results page.

Year	Race	Position	Swim	Bicycle	Run	Result
2011	Challenge Barcelona-Maresme	3.	52:46	4:33:29	2:54:00	8:23:10
2011	Challenge Copenhagen	3.	49:32	4:34:47	2:44:00	8:12:18
2011	Ironman 70.3 Austria	10.	26:06	2:18:59	1:16:17	4:06:00
2010	Ibiza ITU Long Distance Triathlon World Series Event	7.	59:12	3:22:41	1:58:18	6:23:17
2010	Challenge Walchsee, Austria	9.	26:35	2:18:42	1:20:58	4:10:06
2010	Ironman Austria	71.	52:03	5:27:52	2:57:38	9:23:02
2010	Ironman 70.3 Austria	12.	26:33	2:21:18	1:13:45	4:05:30
2010	Ironman 70.3 St. Croix	10.	27:01	2:40:55	1:25:58	4:33:54
2009	Ironman World Championship	29.	53:26	5:02:50	2:59:38	8:59:53
2009	Ironman UK	4.	54:02	5:11:46	2:49:20	9:00:21
2009	Ironman Austria	8.	?	4:44:41	2:52:46	8:29:45
2009	Ironman 70.3 Austria	9.	24:31	2:18:30	1:13:08	3:59:41
2008	Ironman World Championship	23.	56:02	5:02:31	2:50:59	8:54:19
2008	Ironman Austria	5.	49:00	4:42:35	2:48:03	8:28:04
2008	Ironman 70.3 St. Polten	8.	24:51	2:19:29	1:14:53	4:02:18
2007	Ironman 70.3 St. Croix	6.	25:00	2:29:42	1:23:14	4:18:42
2007	Ironman 70.3 St. Polten	12.	25:35	2:24:46	1:15:15	4:08:21
2004	Ironman Austria	55.	50:37	5:14:20	3:12:44	9:23:53
2002	Ironman Austria	1596.	51:18	---	---	DNF

== Coaching career ==
Dejan is Croatian first Ironman certified Coach (generation 2015) from Ironman U University.

He is a founder and Head Coach at Adriatic Coaching and organizer of triathlon camp at Adriatic, particularly at the island of Hvar.

== Ambassador ==
Dejan ia and was involved in some of the major sports projects in Croatia where he served as Ambassador:

- Wings for Life World Run Zadar (from 2014),
- Ironman 70.3 Pula (2015-2017),
- B2B Run Croatia (from 2016).
- Ironman 70.3 Slovenian Istria (2019-2021)
