= Julie Curwin =

Canadian writer

- Education: Mount Allison University, Dalhousie University, Queen's University
- Writing career
- Notable awards: Commonwealth Short Story Competition 2008

Julie Curwin is a Canadian writer. A psychiatrist by profession she has a BA in philosophy and political science from Mount Allison University, a BSc and MD from Dalhousie University, and a diploma in post-graduate medicine (psychiatry) from Queen's University.

Curwin is the winner of the 2008 Commonwealth Short Story Competition. In 2007 her story "The Other Side of the Window" was selected as a finalist in The Writer's Union of Canada's Short Prose Competition for Developing Writers. In 2014, her partial short story collection "Group Therapy at the Butterscotch Palace" was awarded the David Adams Richards Prize by the Writer's Federation of New Brunswick. In October 2020, she published her first book The Appendage Formerly Known as Your Left Arm and Other Stories with Boularderie Island Press in Nova Scotia. In April, 2021, The Appendage Formerly Known as Your Left Arm was shortlisted for two Atlantic Book Awards: The Alistair MacLeod Prize for Short Fiction, and The Margaret and John Savage First Book Award.
