= Katja Mayer =

German triathlete

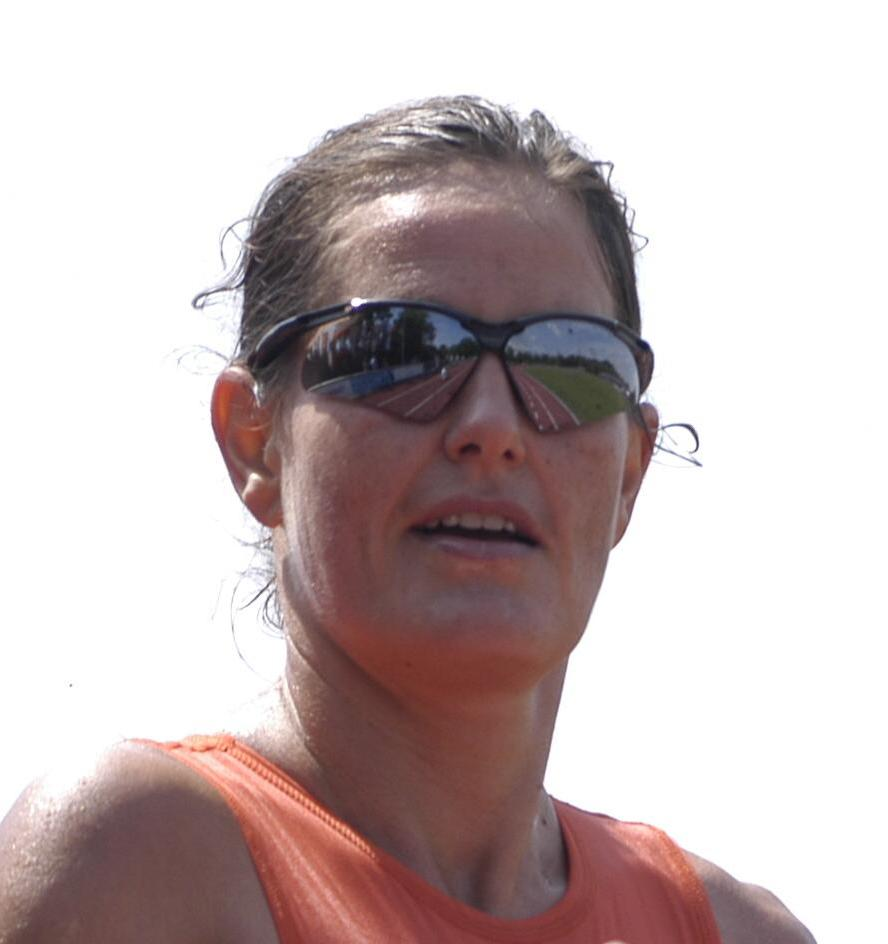
- Mayer in 2007

Personal information
- Born: 4 January 1968 (age 58) Augsburg, Germany

Sport
- Sport: Triathlon

Katja Mayer (born 4 January 1968 in Augsburg) is a former German triathlete and Ironman winner (1999).

== Biography ==
Mayer studied sports science and mathematics at the universities of Munich and Augsburg. In 1996, she graduated in mathematics and sports. In 1998, she began as a license holder for triathlon and cycling. Since 2003, she has also been an assistant professor at the University of Augsburg and a lecturer at the medical training center for physiotherapy. Since 1996 she has trained triathletes, runners, cyclists, mountain bikers, inline skaters and wheelchair users.

In 1992 Mayer qualified for the first place at the world championship in Hawaii over the long distance (3.86 km swimming, 180.2 km cycling and 42.195 km of running) and won the amateur world title. In 1997, she came second in the ETU European Triathlon Long Distance Championship in Fredericia (Denmark), won Ironman Florida in 1999 and won numerous top placements at national and international triathlon and Ironman events.

From 1994 to 2001 she was a member of the German national team in the triathlon. Mayer can record 35 successful Ironman competitions, including eight successful Ironman Hawaii competitions. In a total of twenty Ironman competitions, she was placed in the top 5.

In the summer of 2003 Mayer and her companion Georg Braceschi got married, in November 2004 the couple got a son, three years later a daughter was born.

Mayer is the owner of an event agency that organized events such as the Kuhsee-Triathlon in Augsburg, the Augsburger Stadtlauf and the Augsburg company run. Since 2014, she has also been responsible for the organization of the Munich city run, which is one of Germany's largest people with more than 20,000 participants.
