= Anna Kortelainen =

Finnish scholar, art historian and writer

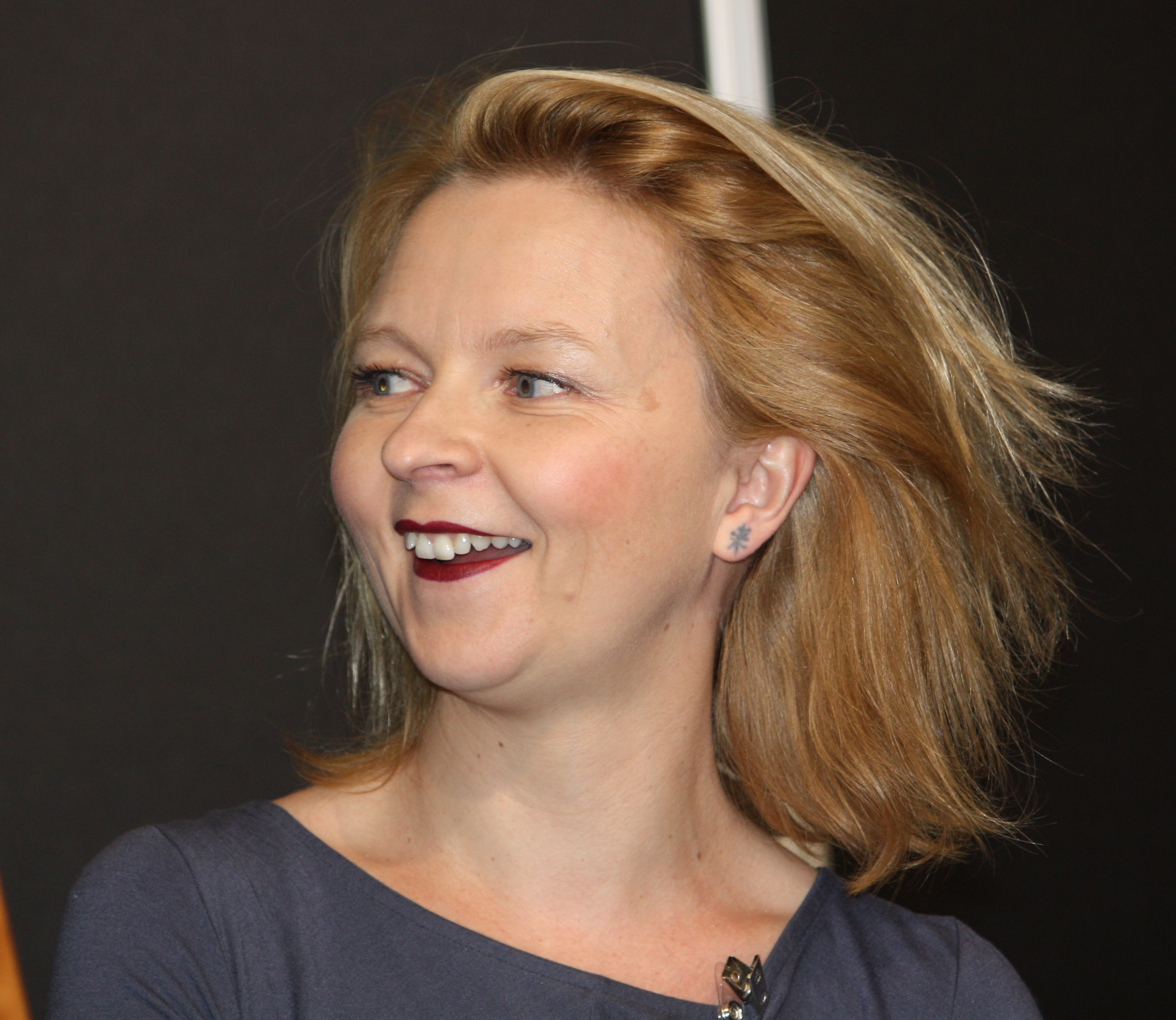
- Born: 12 July 1968 (age 58); Helsinki
- Writing career
- Genre: non-fiction

Anna Taina Aleksandra Kortelainen (née Tuovinen, born 12 July 1968, Helsinki) is a Finnish scholar, art historian and non-fiction writer.

== Life ==
Kortelainen defended her doctoral dissertation in 2002 at the University of Turku about Albert Edelfelt. She teaches art history at the University of Helsinki.

In addition to books, Kortelainen has written essays and articles on art-historical publications, books and exhibitions, as well as columns in magazines and newspapers. She has been named by Timo Haraka's 10 books in 2007, 2011, 2012, and 2013 in the literature series on various themes. In 2011, the program won the Golden Venla Prize as the best television talk show.

In Virginie! Kortelainen examined the fate of Virginie, the young woman whom Albert Edelfelt painted in many of his paintings. The film is based on a television movie.

== Family ==
Kortelainen was married to writer Hannu Mäkelä in 2004–2009. In August 2011, Kortelainen was dating actor Pertti Sveholm.

Stadin Slangi chose her as Stadin Friidu 2015 on Helsinki Day on 12 June 2015.

Kortelainen's novel Ei kenenkään maassa (2012) is based on the life of Reino Peltonen, her maternal grandfather, who was born in 1906 in Vyborg to a Russian physician father and a Finnish mother.

== Works ==
- Niin kutsuttu sydämeni: Albert Edelfeltin kirjeet äidilleen 1873–1901. Kirjeet suomentanut Sirpa Kähkönen. Helsinki: Otava, 2001. ISBN 951-1-14854-0
- Albert Edelfeltin fantasmagoria. Nainen, ”Japani”, tavaratalo. Väitöskirja: Turun yliopisto. Suomalaisen Kirjallisuuden Seuran toimituksia 886. Helsinki: Suomalaisen Kirjallisuuden Seura, 2002. ISBN 951-746-409-6.
- Virginie! Albert Edelfeltin rakastajattaren tarina. Helsinki: Tammi, 2002. ISBN 951-31-2457-6.
- Puolivilli puutarha: Albert Edelfeltin Haikko. Helsinki: Otava, 2004. ISBN 951-1-19313-9
- Levoton nainen. Hysterian kulttuurihistoriaa. Helsinki: Tammi, 2003. ISBN 951-31-2754-0.
- Päivä naisten paratiisissa. Helsinki: WSOY, 2005. ISBN 951-0-30653-3.
- Rakkautta sattumalta. Kirjoituksia. Helsinki: Tammi 2006. ISBN 951-31-3504-7 – Pohjautuu pääosin Me Naisissa ja Turun Sanomissa vuosina 2003–2006 julkaistuihin kolumneihin.
- Naisen tie – L. Onervan kapina. Helsinki: Otava, 2006. ISBN 951-1-20665-6 – Teos kirjailija L. Onervasta. Teoksessa Edelfelt, Matkoja, maisemia, naamiaisia. Toim. Erkki Anttonen. Artikkeli "Piukkoja paikkoja ja taiteilijanaamiaisia: Edelfeltin valepuvut".
- Varhaiset johtotähdet. Suomen ensimmäisiä johtajanaisia. EVA-raportti. Naiset huipulle! -hanke. Helsinki: Taloustieto, 2007. ISBN 978-951-628-460-9. Teoksen verkkoversio (PDF).
- Pöytä kahdelle – ikkunan ääreltä. Helsinki: Tammi, 2007. ISBN 978-951-31-3840-0. – Yhteisteos Hannu Mäkelän kanssa
- Hurmio. Oireet, hoito, ennaltaehkäisy. Helsinki: Tammi, 2009. ISBN 978-951-31-4867-6.
- Kivipiirtäjä: Taiteilija Antti Niemisen elämä. Gummerus, 2014. ISBN 978-951-20-9713-5
