= Marc Herremans =

Belgian triathlete

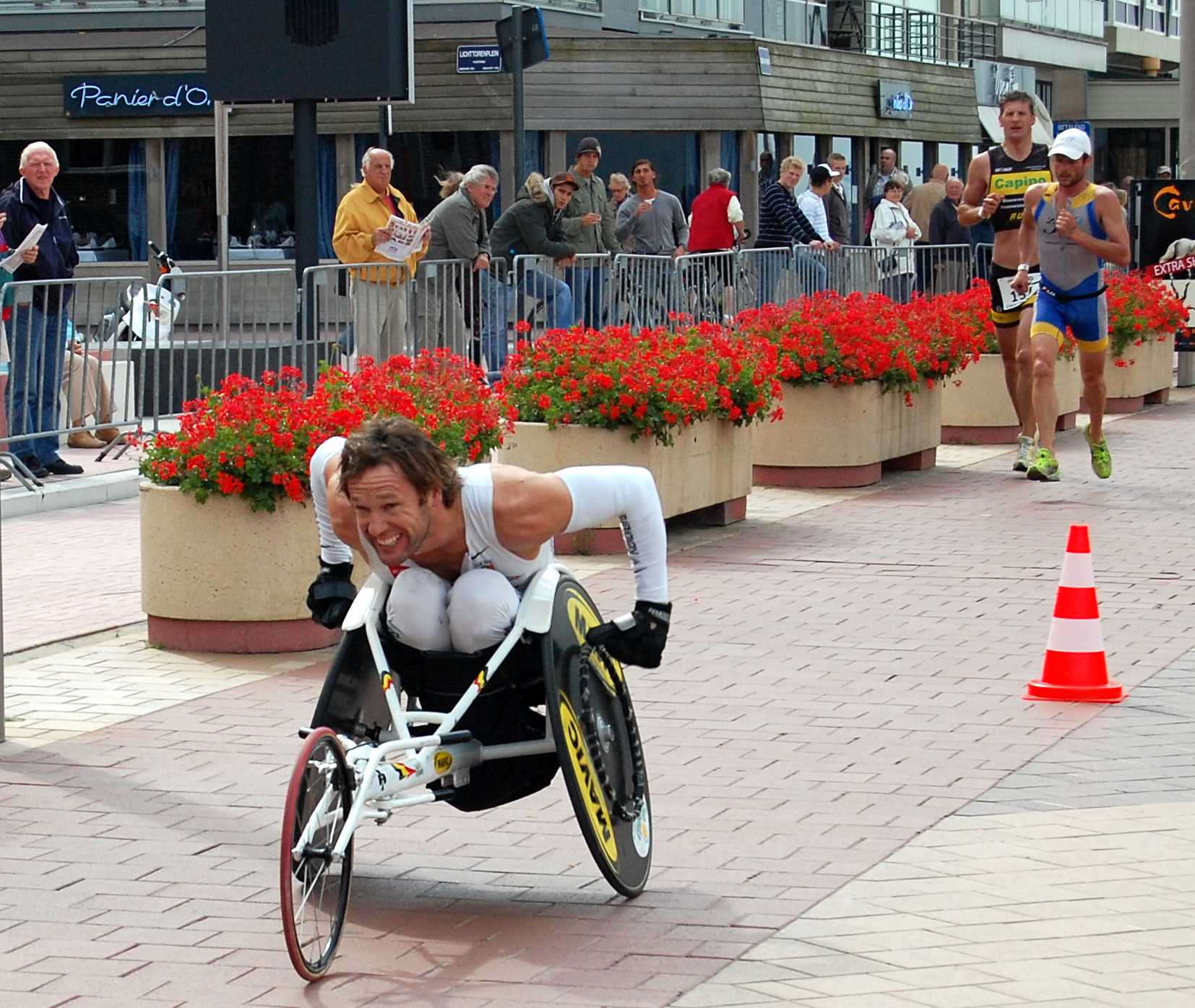
Herremans competing at the triathlon in Knokke, Belgium.

Marc Herremans (Merksem, 19 December 1973) is a Belgian triathlete and motivational speaker.

== Triathlete ==
Herremans finished fourth in the Ironman of Australia, so secured a place for the 2001 Ironman World Championship held in Hawaii. On 6 October 2001, he finished in 6th place in the Ironman of Hawaii. He had only been training for triathlons since 1998, and he was considered by his trainers to have enormous potential. He was expected to compete for one of the top three positions the following year.

== Paralysis ==
On 28 January 2002, during bike training in Lanzarote, Herremans fell at a dangerous bend, landed on rocks, and broke his back. He was immediately brought to a hospital, where doctors determined that he had suffered total paralysis from his stomach to his feet, and would be forced to live in a wheelchair for the rest of his life.

Only three months after the accident, he began training for the Ironman Championship as a wheelchair athlete. In 2002, he was elected by the Belgian press as sports personality of the year. He earned the nickname "Mad Max" due to his determination and unwillingness to give up.

== Wheelchair athlete ==
Herremans participated in the Ironman of Hawaii in 2002, only 10 months after his accident. He participated again every following year. In 2006, he finally succeeded in his goal: he was the first wheelchair athlete to arrive at the finish of the Ironman of Hawaii. He received no prize money, since wheelchair athletes do not receive prizes.

== To Walk Again ==
In 2003, he started a foundation called "To Walk Again" that supports other disabled people, with such efforts as creating a sports centre for disabled people, and investing in bone marrow research. Herremans was especially inspired when he met disabled celebrity Christopher Reeve.

In October 2007, he became the first person to complete the Crocodile Trophy with a hand bike. The Crocodile Trophy is one of the world's hardest mountain bike races, traversing part of Northern Australia.

== Book and movie ==
Herremans has written a book and helped in the making of a film about his life. The book, the film, and Herremans's foundation are all titled To Walk Again. The film, directed by Stijn Coninx, with a soundtrack provided by Ozark Henry, follows Herremans in his efforts to win the Ironman and to help disabled people with their lives by encouraging them through his To Walk Again Foundation.
