= Peter Sandvang =

Danish triathlete

Personal information
- Nationality: Danish
- Born: 24 June 1968 (age 58) Hillerød, Denmark

Sport
- Coached by: Gabor Kløczl
Medal record
Men's long distance triathlon
Representing Denmark
ITU Long Distance World Championships
Gold medal – first place	1999 Säter	Individual
Gold medal – first place	2000 Nice	Individual
Gold medal – first place	2001 Fredericia	Individual
Silver medal – second place	2000 Nice	Men's Team
Bronze medal – third place	1998 Sado Island	Individual
ETU European Long Distance Championships
Gold medal – first place	1997 Fredericia	Individual

Peter Sandvang (born 24 June 1968, Hillerød, Denmark) is a Danish former professional triathlete. He won the European Long Distance Triathlon Championship in 1997 and was a three-time ITU Long Distance Triathlon World Champion, winning the title in 1999, 2000 and 2001.

== Career ==
Sandvang was born in Hillerød, Denmark. After competing in international short-course events during the early 1990s, including the 1993 ITU World Championships in Manchester, he increasingly focused on long-distance triathlon.

The years from 1997 to 2002 represented his golden period, with major wins or medals in each of those six seasons.

In 1997, Sandvang won the ETU European Long Distance Triathlon Championship in Fredericia, Denmark.

He won bronze at the ITU Long Distance Triathlon World Championships in Sado Island in 1998, before achieving international prominence by winning three consecutive ITU Long Distance Triathlon World Championships; in 1999 in Säter, Sweden, in 2000 in Nice, France and finally in a home championships, in 2001 in Fredericia, Denmark, the site of his earlier European Championship victory.

In addition to his championship successes, Sandvang won Ironman New Zealand in 1998 and Ironman Lanzarote in 2002. He also recorded several podium finishes at the St. Croix Triathlon and competed multiple times at the Ironman World Championship in Hawaii.

Sandvang retired from professional competition in 2003, aged 35.

== Major achievements ==
=== Long Distance Triathlon Championships ===
Year	Competition	Venue	Event	Result
Representing Denmark
1997	European Long Distance Triathlon Championships	Fredericia, Denmark	Men's elite	1st place, gold medalist(s)
1998	ITU Long Distance Triathlon World Championships	Sado, Japan	Men's elite	3rd place, bronze medalist(s)
1999	ITU Long Distance Triathlon World Championships	Säter, Sweden	Men's elite	1st place, gold medalist(s)
2000	ITU Long Distance Triathlon World Championships	Nice, France	Men's elite	1st place, gold medalist(s)
2000	ITU Long Distance Triathlon World Championships	Nice, France	Men's team	2nd place, silver medalist(s)
2001	ITU Long Distance Triathlon World Championships	Fredericia, Denmark	Men's elite	1st place, gold medalist(s)

=== Selected other victories ===
- Ironman New Zealand (1998) (gold)
- Ironman Lanzarote (2002) (gold)
