= Cyrille Neveu =

Personal information
- Nationality: French
- Born: 15 February 1973 (age 53) Léhon, Côtes-d'Armor, France
- Height: 1.72 m (5 ft 8 in)

Sport
- Sport: Triathlon
- Turned pro: 1989
- Coached by: Brett Sutton (1992–1994)
- Retired: 2008
Medal record
Men's triathlon
Representing France
ITU Long Distance Triathlon World Championships
| Gold medal – first place | 2002 Nice | Individual |
| Silver medal – second place | 2000 Nice | Individual |

Cyrille Neveu (born 15 February 1973) is a French former professional triathlete. He is best known for winning the ITU Long Distance Triathlon World Championships in 2002 and the prestigious ultra-distance Embrunman in 2003. He competed professionally from 1989 to 2008.

Following his retirement, he later founded the international Alpe d'Huez Triathlon.

== Early life and career ==
Neveu began in competitive swimming before transitioning to triathlon in 1989, securing early national podiums in the 1990s. From 1992 to 1994, he was coached by Brett Sutton, building endurance for long-distance racing.

== Professional career ==
Neveu joined the French national team in 2000, winning silver at the 2000 ITU Long Distance World Championships in Nice, France. He achieved his career peak at the same venue by winning gold two years later at the 2002 ITU Long Distance World Championships, followed by a historic victory at the 2003 Embrunman where he broke the 10-hour barrier. He later placed second at Ironman South Africa in 2005 and competed in Kona before retiring in 2008.

He was four times a member of the French team that won the team award at the ITU Long Distance Triathlon World Championships (1998. 1999, 2000, 2002).

== Post-retirement ==
In 2006, while nearing the end of his professional career, Neveu founded the Alpe d'Huez Triathlon, to take advantage in the sport of triathlon of the fame of the mountain in the cycling world, where it is regularly featured in the Tour de France. It quickly became an annual mountain triathlon event on the international circuit.

== Career results ==
The table below presents the most significant results (podiums) obtained by Neveu on the national and international triathlon circuits since 1996.

| Year | Competition | Country | Position | Time |
|---|---|---|---|---|
| 1996 | French Long Distance Championships | France | 3rd place, bronze medalist(s) | 6:02:22 |
| 1998 | ITU Long Distance World Championships (Team) | Japan | 1st place, gold medalist(s) | — |
| 1999 | ITU Long Distance World Championships (Team) | Sweden | 1st place, gold medalist(s) | — |
| 1999 | Triathlon de Gérardmer | France | 3rd place, bronze medalist(s) | — |
| 1999 | French National Long Distance Championships | France | 3rd place, bronze medalist(s) | — |
| 2000 | ITU Long Distance World Championships | France | 2nd place, silver medalist(s) | 6:23:16 |
| 2000 | ITU Long Distance World Championships (Team) | France | 1st place, gold medalist(s) | — |
| 2002 | ITU Long Distance World Championships | France | 1st place, gold medalist(s) | 6:19:45 |
| 2002 | ITU Long Distance World Championships (Team) | France | 1st place, gold medalist(s) | — |
| 2002 | French Long Distance Championships | France | 1st place, gold medalist(s) | — |
| 2003 | Embrunman | France | 1st place, gold medalist(s) | 9:59:21 |
| 2005 | Ironman South Africa | South Africa | 2nd place, silver medalist(s) | 8:37:25 |
