= Belinda Smith =

Australian rules footballer (born 1995)

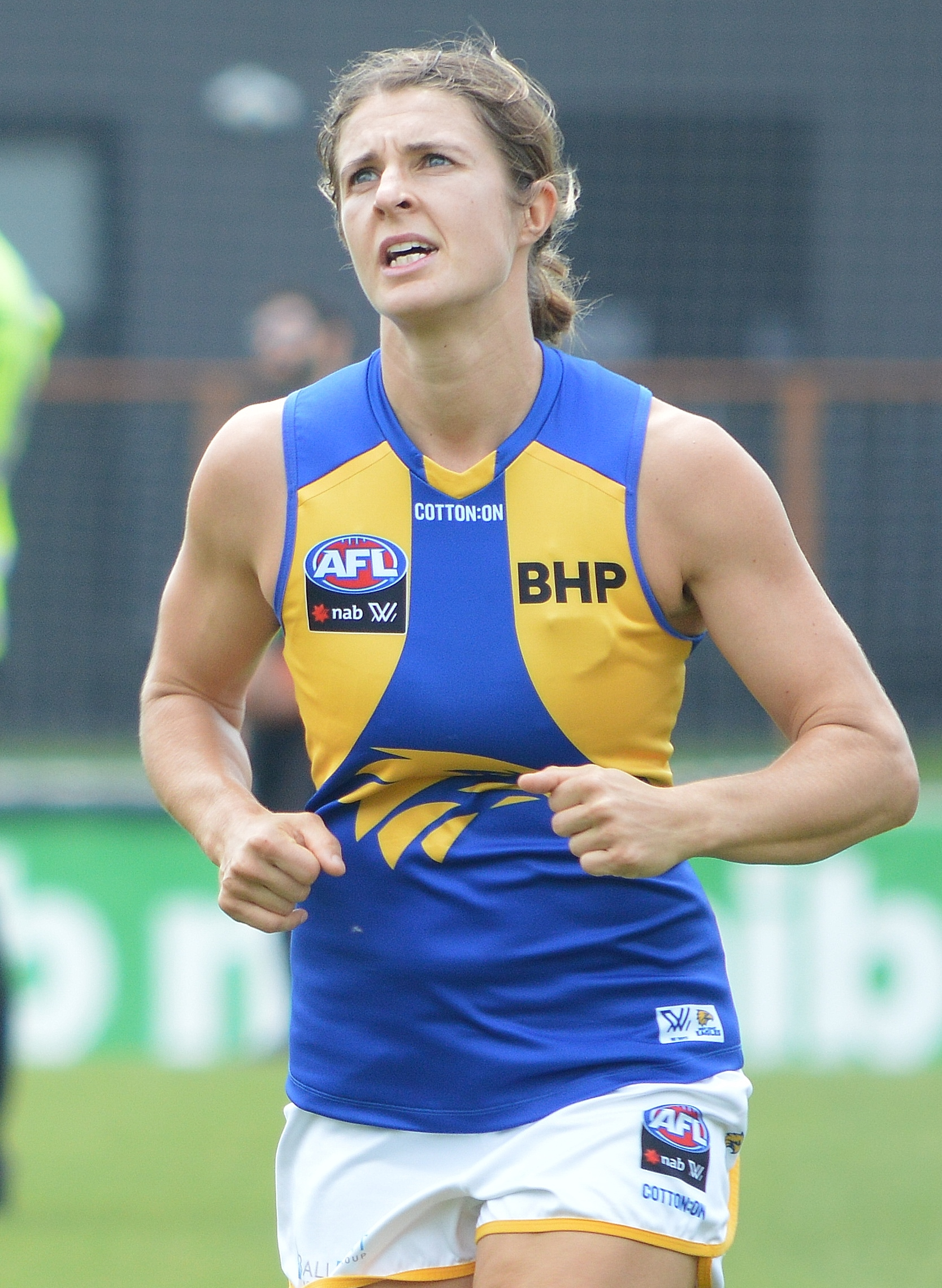
- Smith during a pre-season practice match with West Coast in 2020

Personal information
- Born: 1 June 1995 (age 31); Lake Grace, Western Australia
- Original team: East Fremantle (WAWFL)
- Draft: No. 100, 2016 AFL Women's draft
- Debut: Round 1, 2017, Fremantle vs. Western Bulldogs, at VU Whitten Oval
- Height: 165 cm (5 ft 5 in)
- Position: Defender

Club information
- Current club: Western Bulldogs
- Number: 14

Playing career^{1}
Years	Club	Games (Goals)
2017–2018	Fremantle	12 (0)
2019	Western Bulldogs	3 (0)
2020–	West Coast	45 (1)
Total		60 (1)
- ^{1} Playing statistics correct to the end of the 2023 season.

Career highlights
- East Fremantle WAWFL premiership player

Belinda Smith (born 1 June 1995) is an Australian rules footballer playing for West Coast in the AFL Women's (AFLW).

== Early life ==
Smith was born in Lake Grace, Western Australia.

== AFL Women's career ==
=== Fremantle (2017–2018) ===
Smith was drafted by Fremantle with their 13th selection and 100th overall in the 2016 AFL Women's draft. She made her debut in the thirty-two point loss to the Western Bulldogs at VU Whitten Oval in the opening round of the 2017 season. She played every match in her debut season to finish with seven matches.

=== Western Bulldogs (2019) ===
In June 2018, Smith was delisted by Fremantle and was signed by the Western Bulldogs as a free agent.

=== West Coast (2020–present) ===
In April 2019, Smith joined expansion club West Coast.
