= Torbjørn Sindballe =

Danish triathlete

Medal record

Men's Triathlon

Representing Denmark

ITU Long Distance World Championships
Gold medal – first place	2004 Sater	Elite men's race
Gold medal – first place	2006 Canberra	Elite men's race
Silver medal – second place	1999 Sater	Elite men's race
Silver medal – second place	2002 Nice	Elite men's race

Ironman World Championship
Bronze medal – third place	2007	Individual

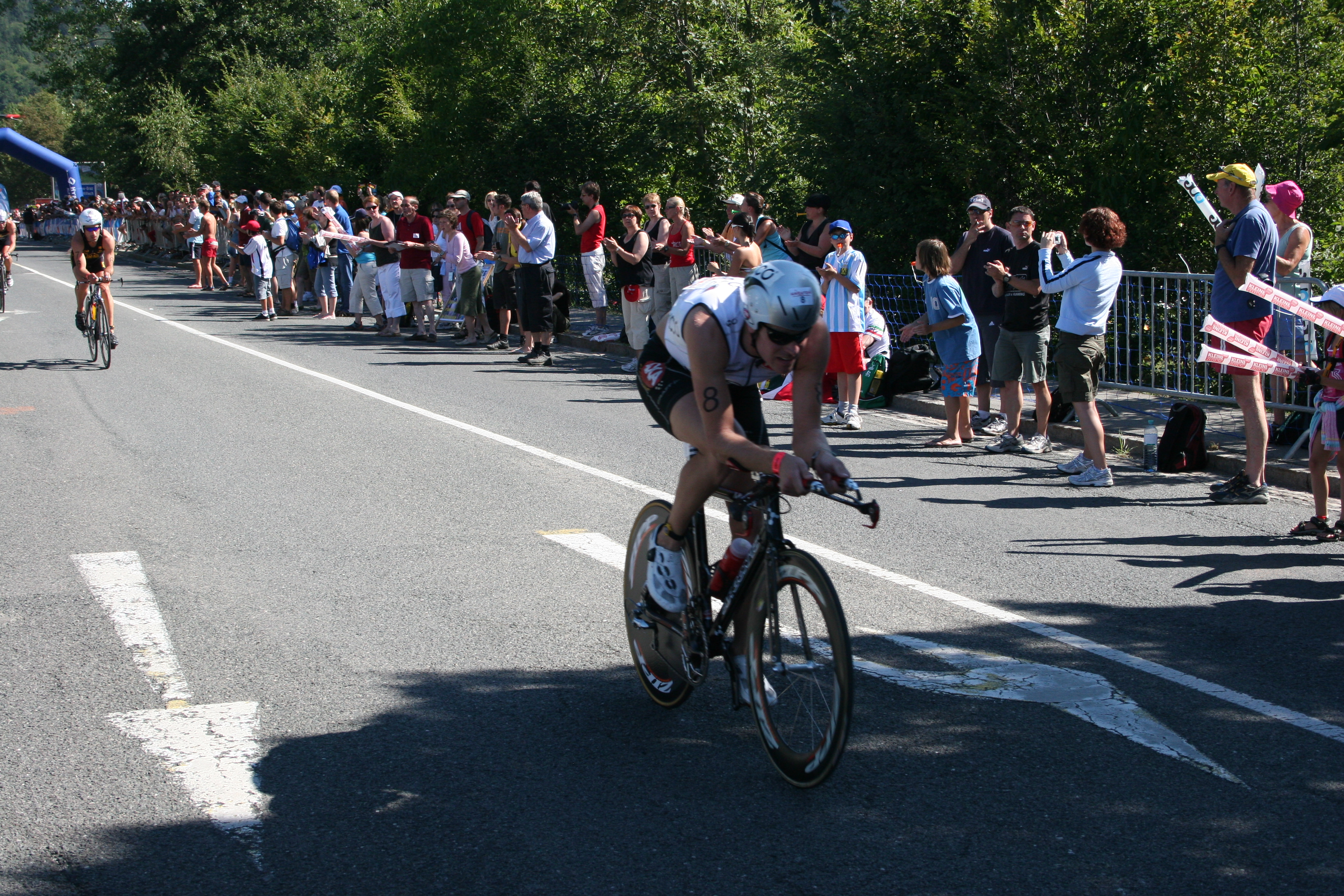
Torbjørn Sindballe at Ironman Austria 2006

Torbjørn Sindballe (born 21 October 1976) is a Danish professional triathlete who was forced to end his competition triathlon career due to heart problems. Torbjørn Sindballe lives in northern Sjælland with his wife Mette, and their 5-year-old son Oskar.

== Particular physique ==
Thorbjørn Sindballe weighs in at 80 kg and is 190 cm tall, which is an unusual size for an elite triathlete. His size makes him less aerodynamic, heavier for running, and makes it harder for him to endure the heat, which is a strong factor in several important competitions.

== Triathlon career ==
He had his first career breakthrough when he won the Danish and Nordic Championships in 1998, and next year won World Championship Silver. However, his career has been plagued by injuries but he somehow has still managed a very healthy career, with many impressive results, including:

- 1st ITU Long Distance Triathlon World Championship (Canberra) 2006
- 1st Half Ironman Triathlon Port Macguarie 2006
- 1st Ironman 70.3 California 2005
- 1st ITU Long Distance Triathlon World Championship (Sater) 2004
- 1st ITU Long Distance Triathlon European Championship 2003
- 2nd Ironman Florida 2008
- 3rd Challenge Roth 2008
- 3rd Ironman New Zealand 2007
- 3rd Ironman Hawaii 2007
- 2nd Wildfire Triathlon(San Antonio) 2005
- 2nd Ironman Wisconsin 2003
- 3rd Ironman 70.3 California 2003
- 2nd ITU Long Distance Triathlon World Championship (Nice) 2002
- 2nd ITU Long Distance Triathlon World Championship (Sater) 1999

== Racing in the heat ==
The thing that Torbjørn believes held him back from success in the Ironman Hawaii is his body's inability to handle the heat. To deal with this problem, he has developed, in cooperation with his sponsor Craft of Scandinavia, several methods to endure the heat more effectively: including running in all white, while soaked in water, as well as a glove filled with ice, to cool him down.

== End of competitive triathlon career ==
Torbjørn Sindballe was forced to announce end to his competitive triathlon career on 30 June 2009, due to a bicuspid aortic valve.
