= Marijke Zeekant =

Dutch rower (born 1956)

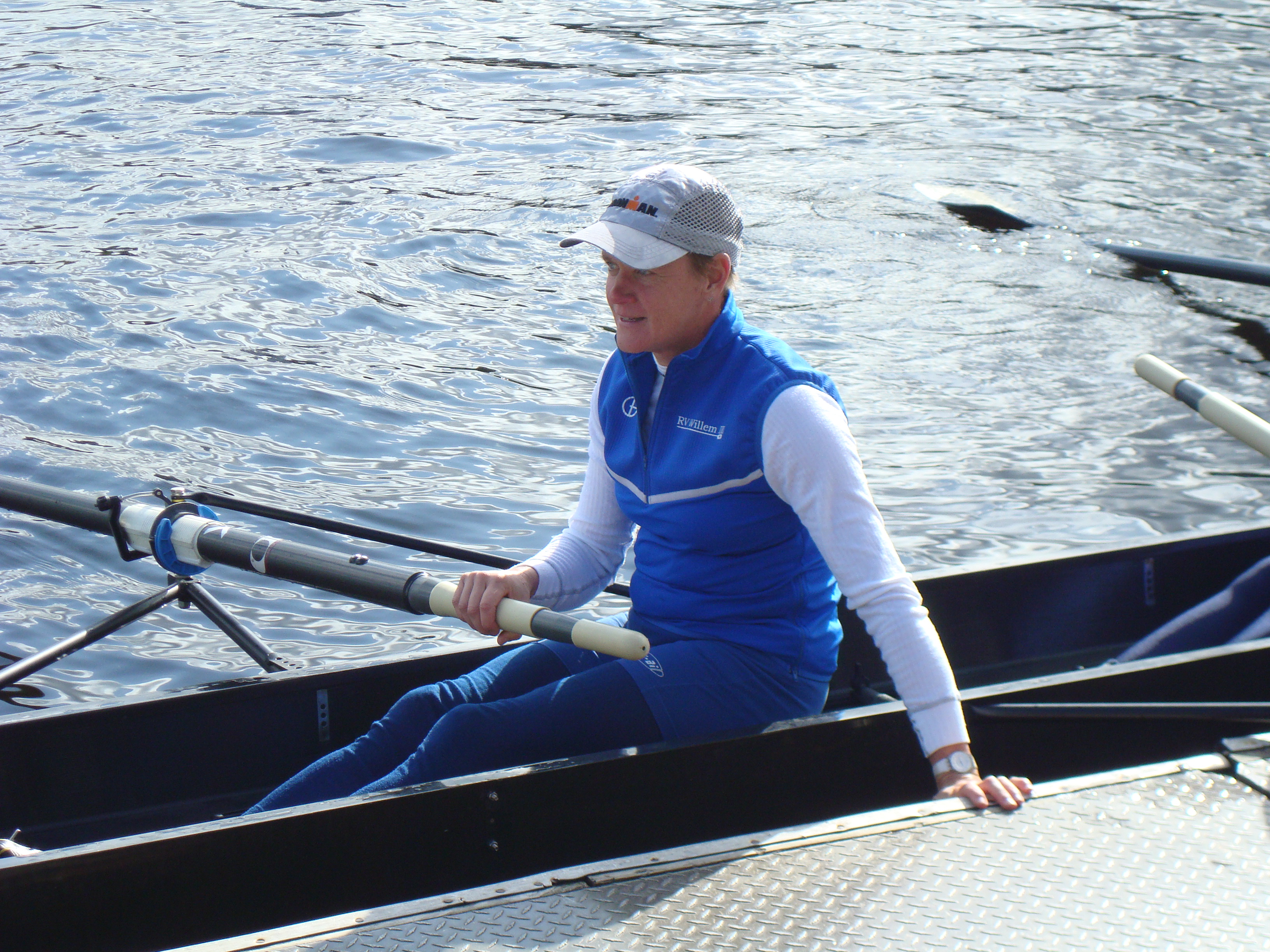
- Marijke Zeekant in 2009

Personal information
- Nationality: Dutch
- Born: 12 December 1956 (age 68); Medemblik, Netherlands

Sport
- Sport: Rowing

Marijke Zeekant (born 12 December 1956) is a Dutch rower. She competed in the women's quadruple sculls event at the 1988 Summer Olympics.
