= Grand Prix de Triathlon =

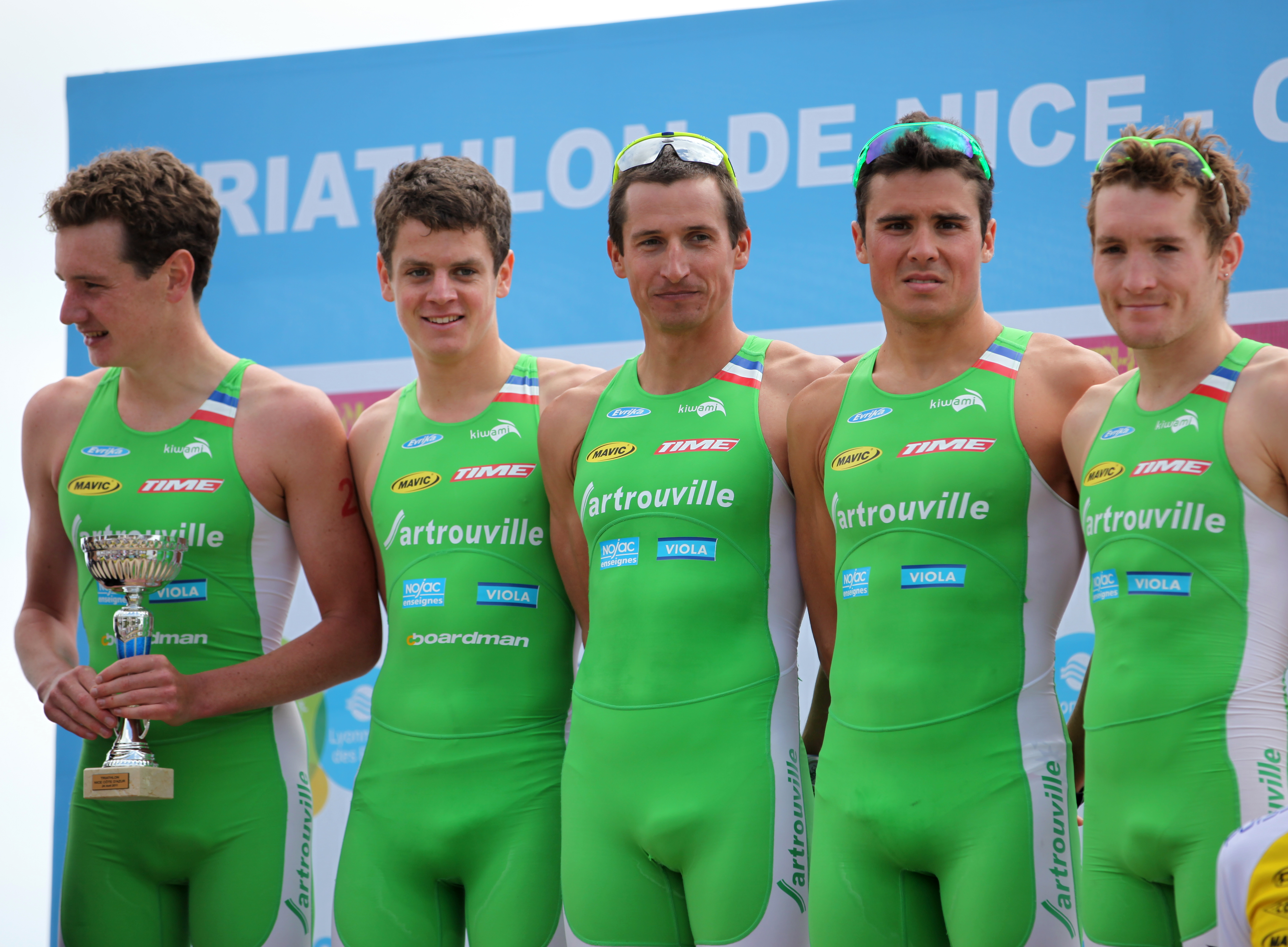
Sartrouville's stars Alistair (left) and Jonathan (right) Brownlee and Javier Gómez Noya with Diemunsch and Ospaly in Nice, 2011.

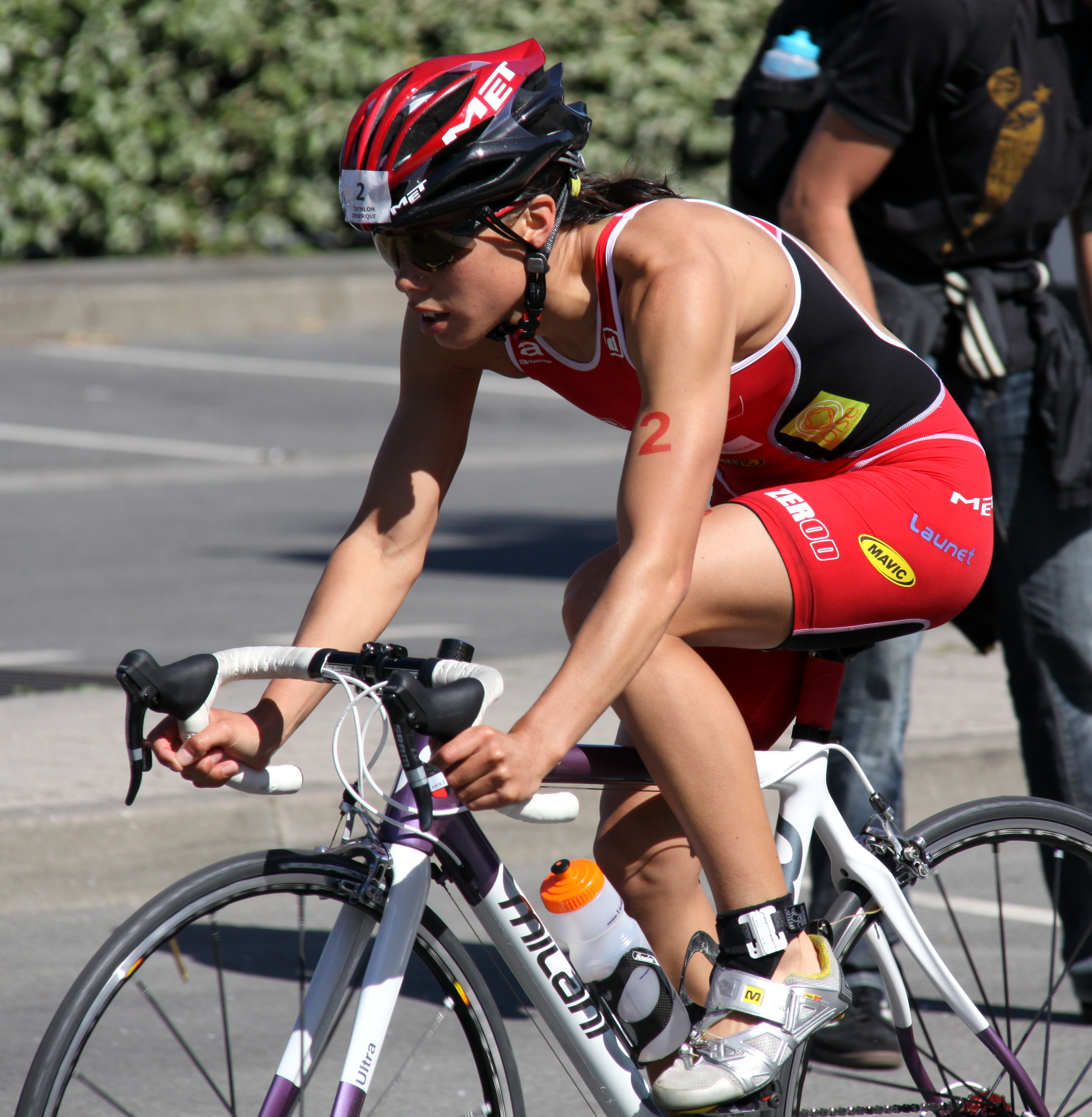
Andrea Hewitt (Beauvais Tri) on her way to gold at Dunkirk, 2010.

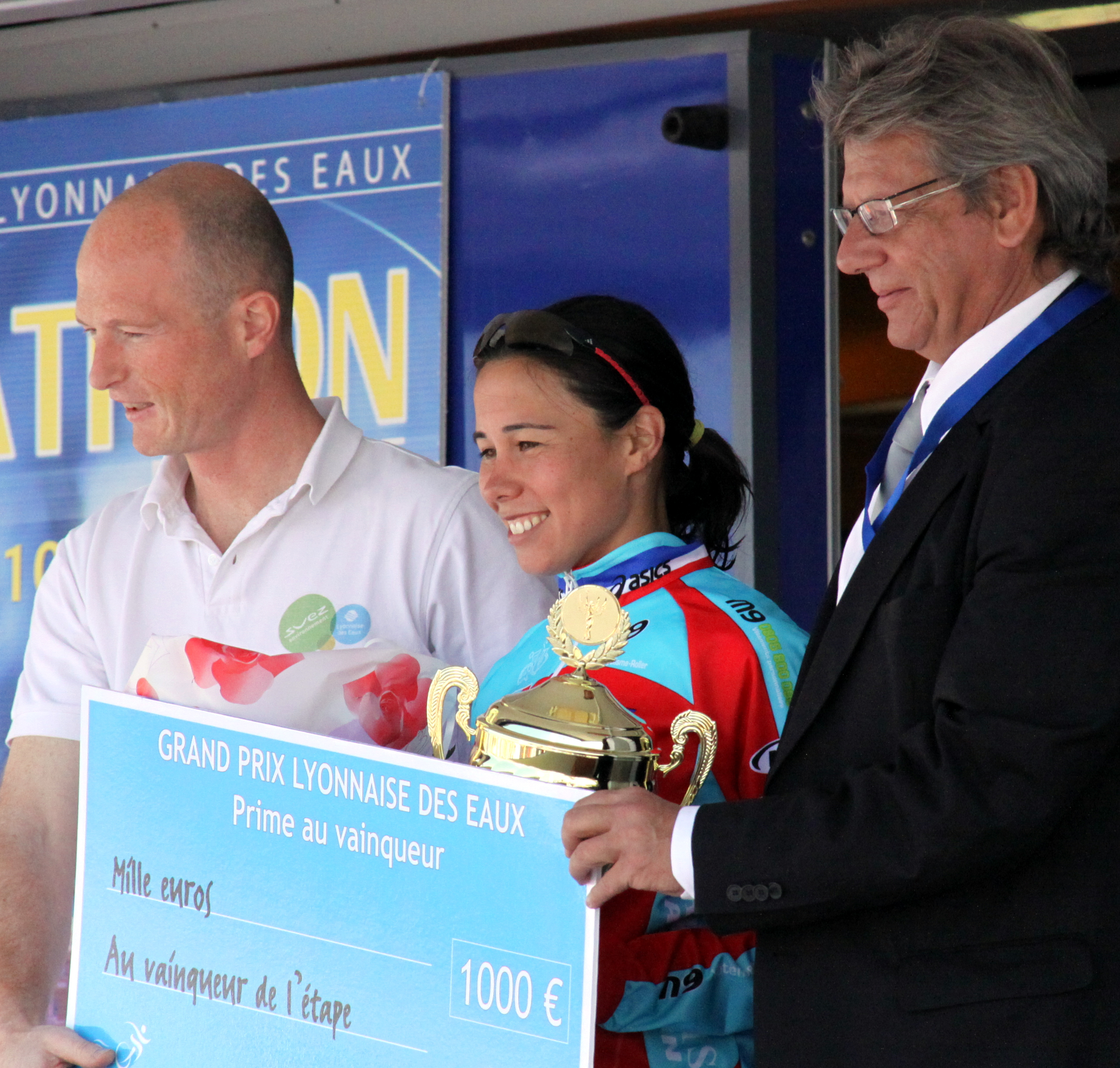
Andrea Hewitt, the gold medalist in the individual ranking of the Triathlon de Dunkerque, 2010.

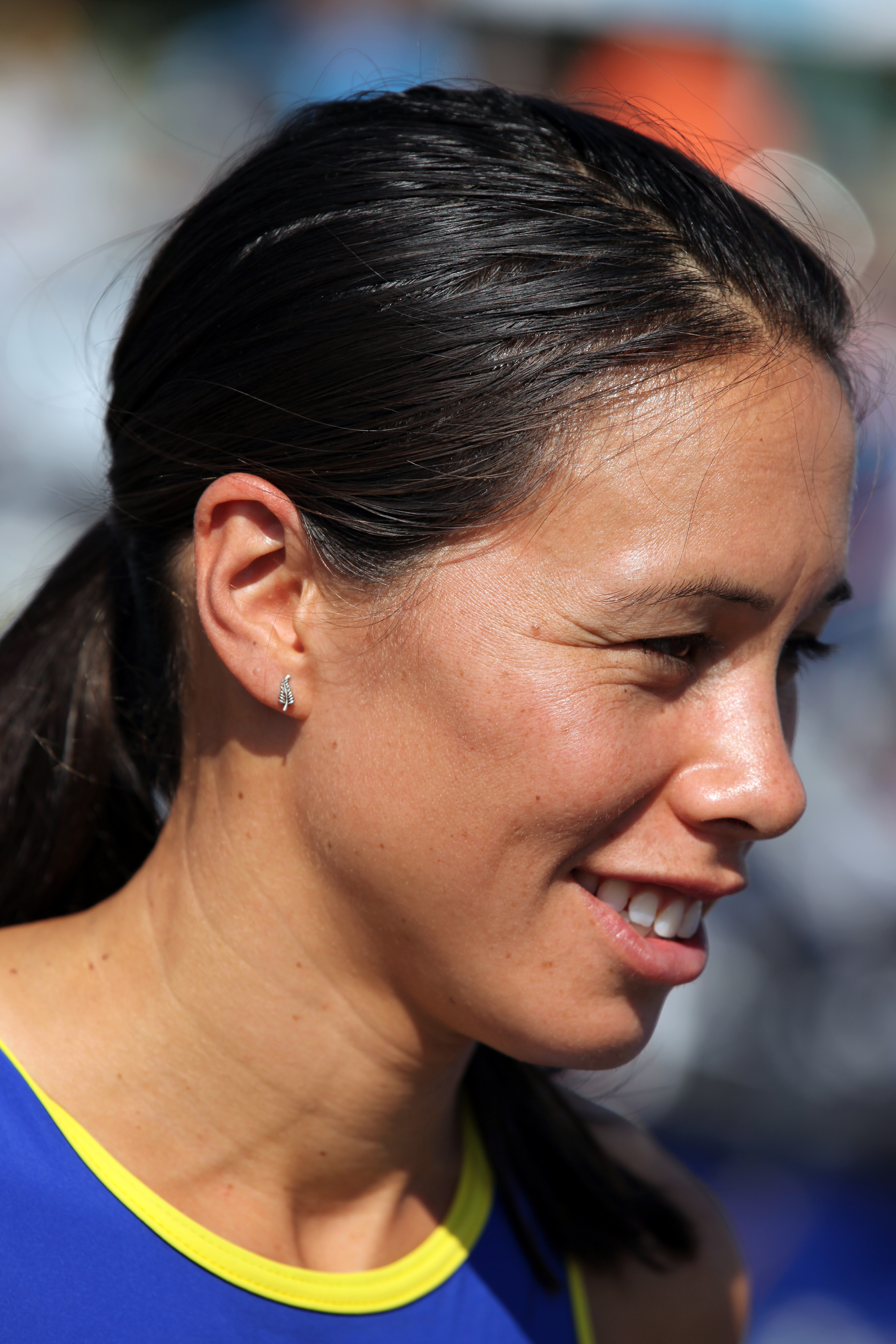
Andrea Hewitt, the gold medalist in the individual ranking of the Triathlon de Nice, 2012.

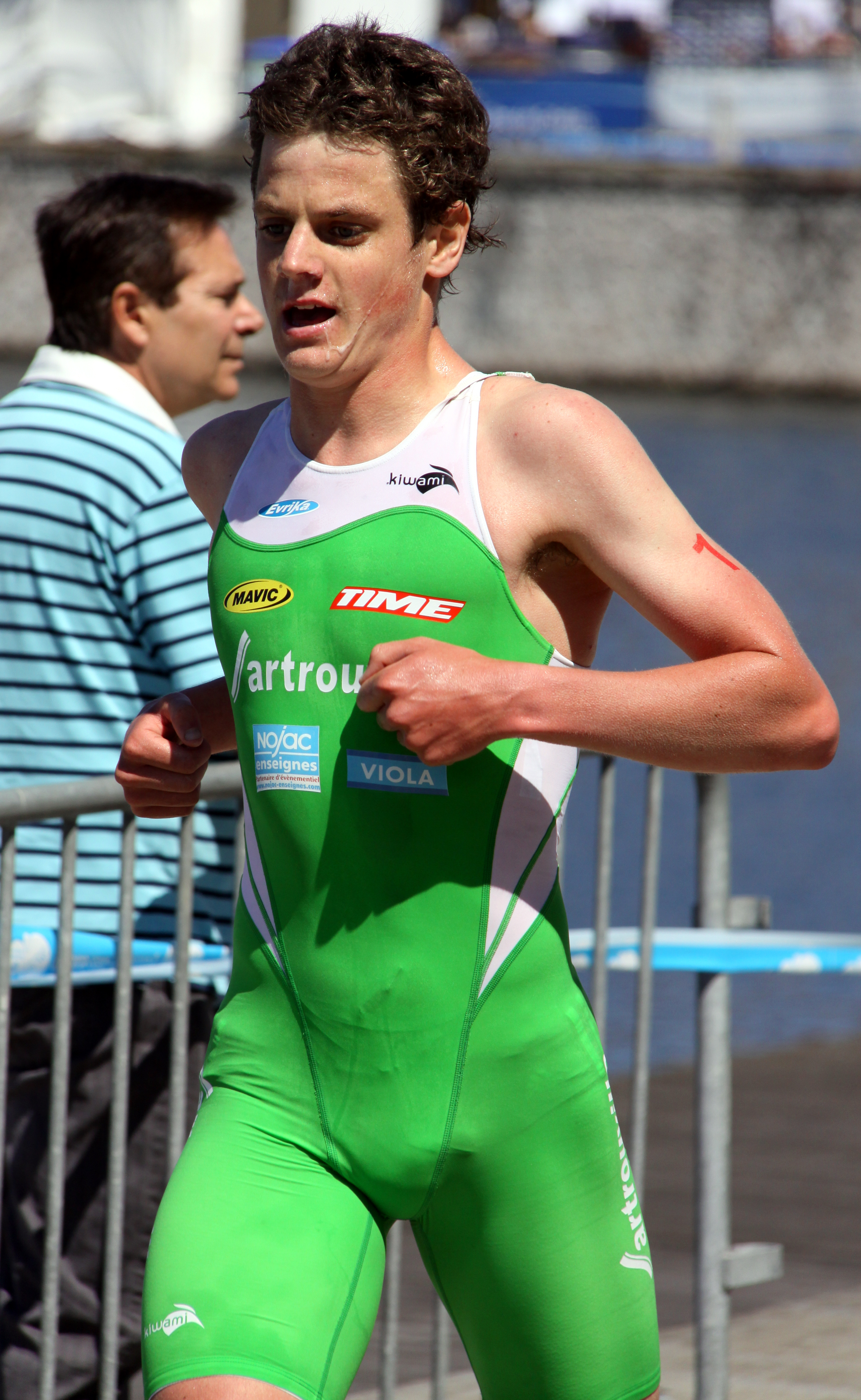
Jonathan Brownlee winning gold at the triathlon in Dunkirk, 2010.

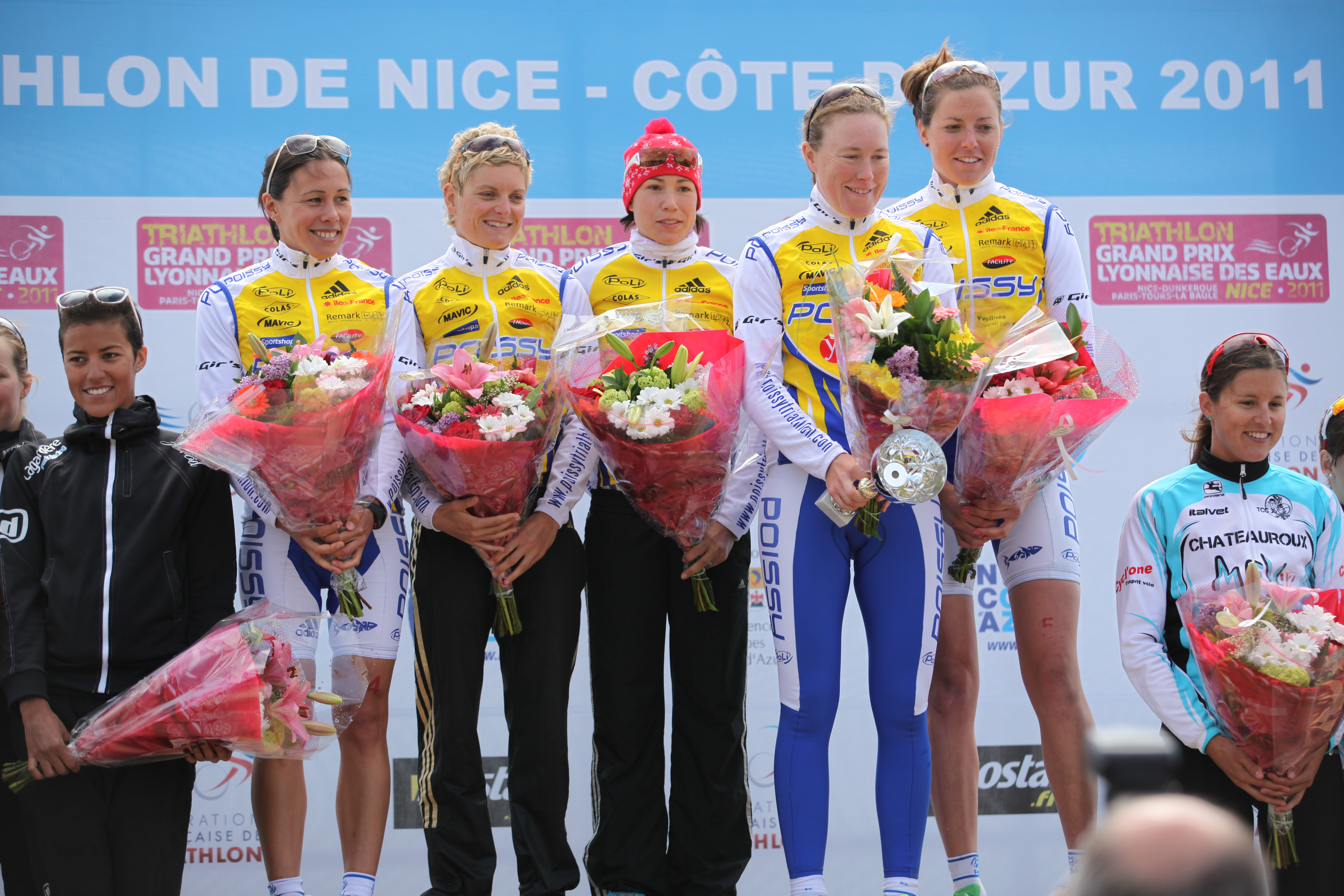
Poissy Triathlon (Andrea Hewitt, Carole Peon, Kathrin Muller, Jessica Harrison, Berengere Abraham) with the gold medal in Nice, 2011

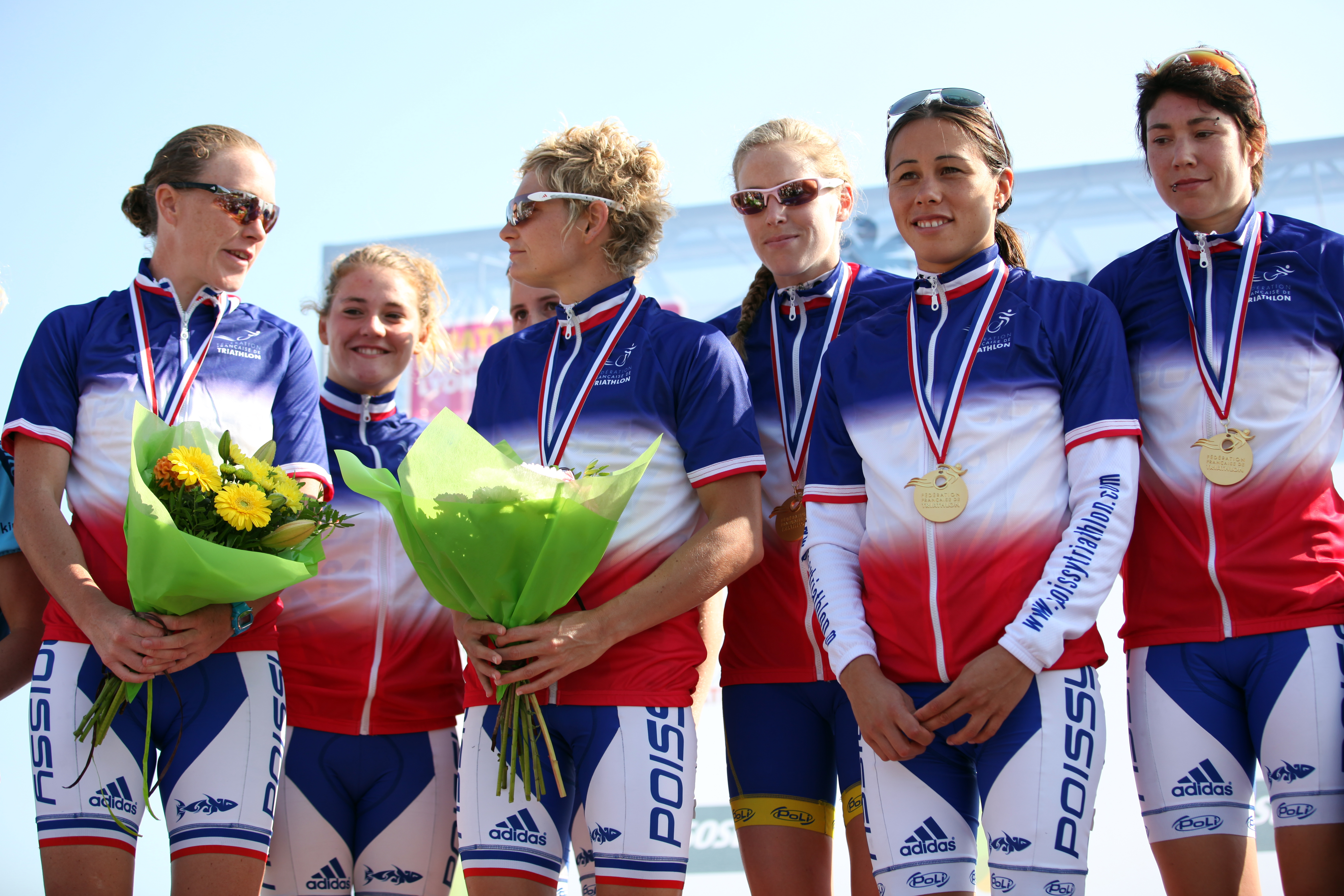
Jessica Harrison, Carole Peon, Aileen Morrison, Andrea Hewitt, and Kathrin Muller) again with the gold medal in Nice, 2012.

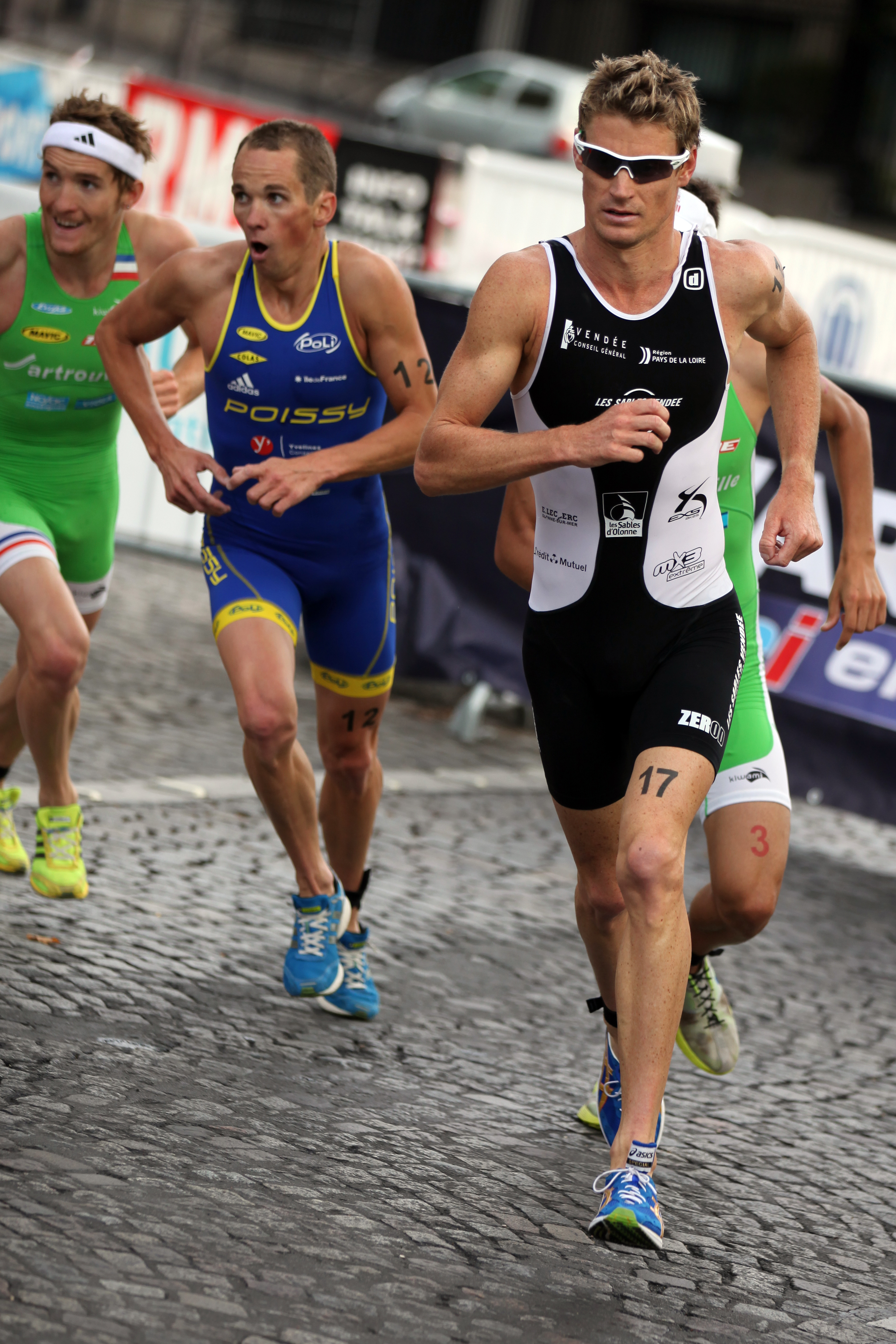
Brad Kahlefeldt and Gregory Rouault at the Triathlon de Paris, 2011.

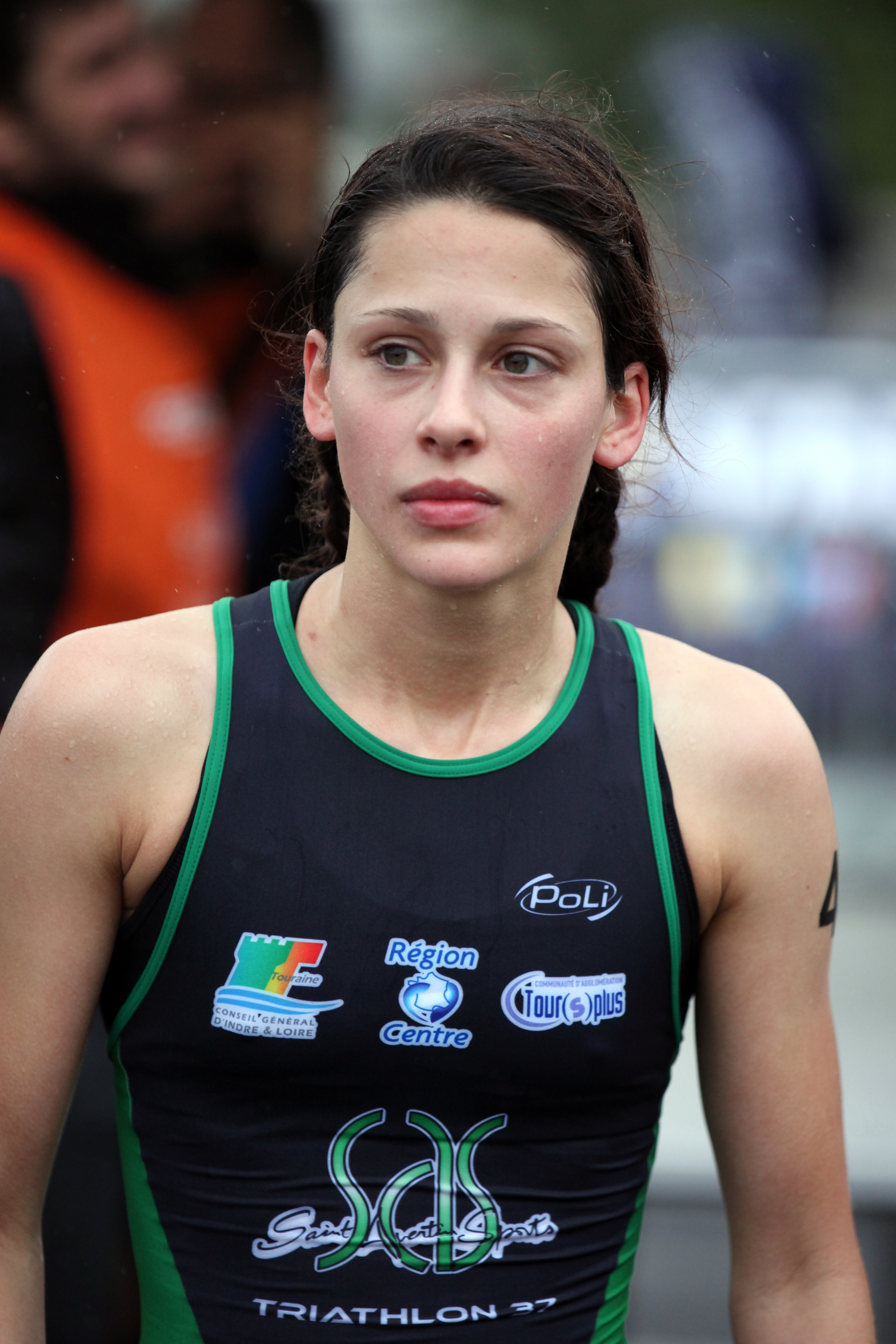
Hannah Drewett, a British Junior, at the Triathlon de Paris, 2011.

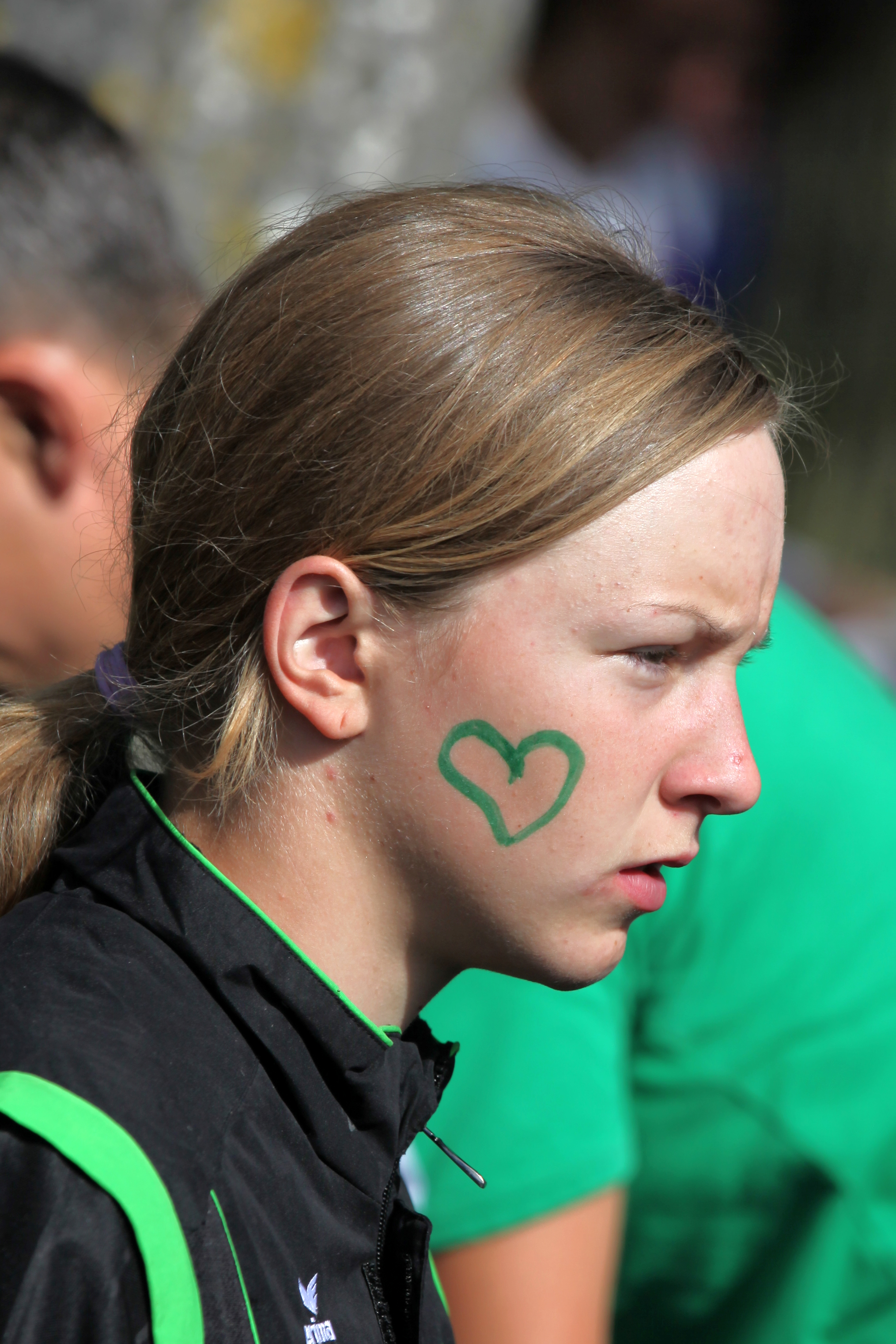
Monika Oražem, a Slovenian junior at the Grand Prix Triathlon in Tours, 2011.

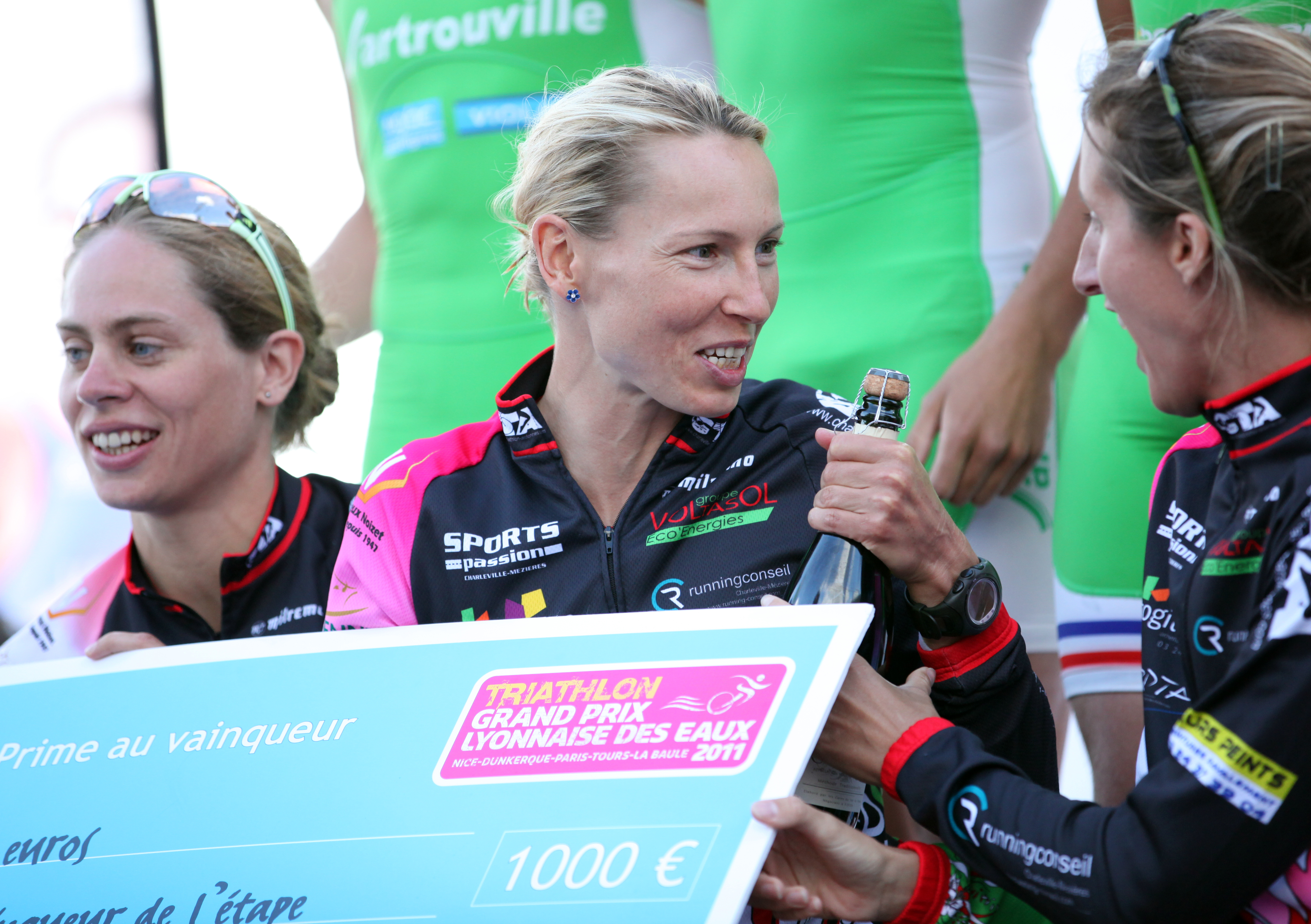
Anja Dittmer, Katrien Verstuyft and Delphine Py-Bilot gold medalists at Tours, 2011.

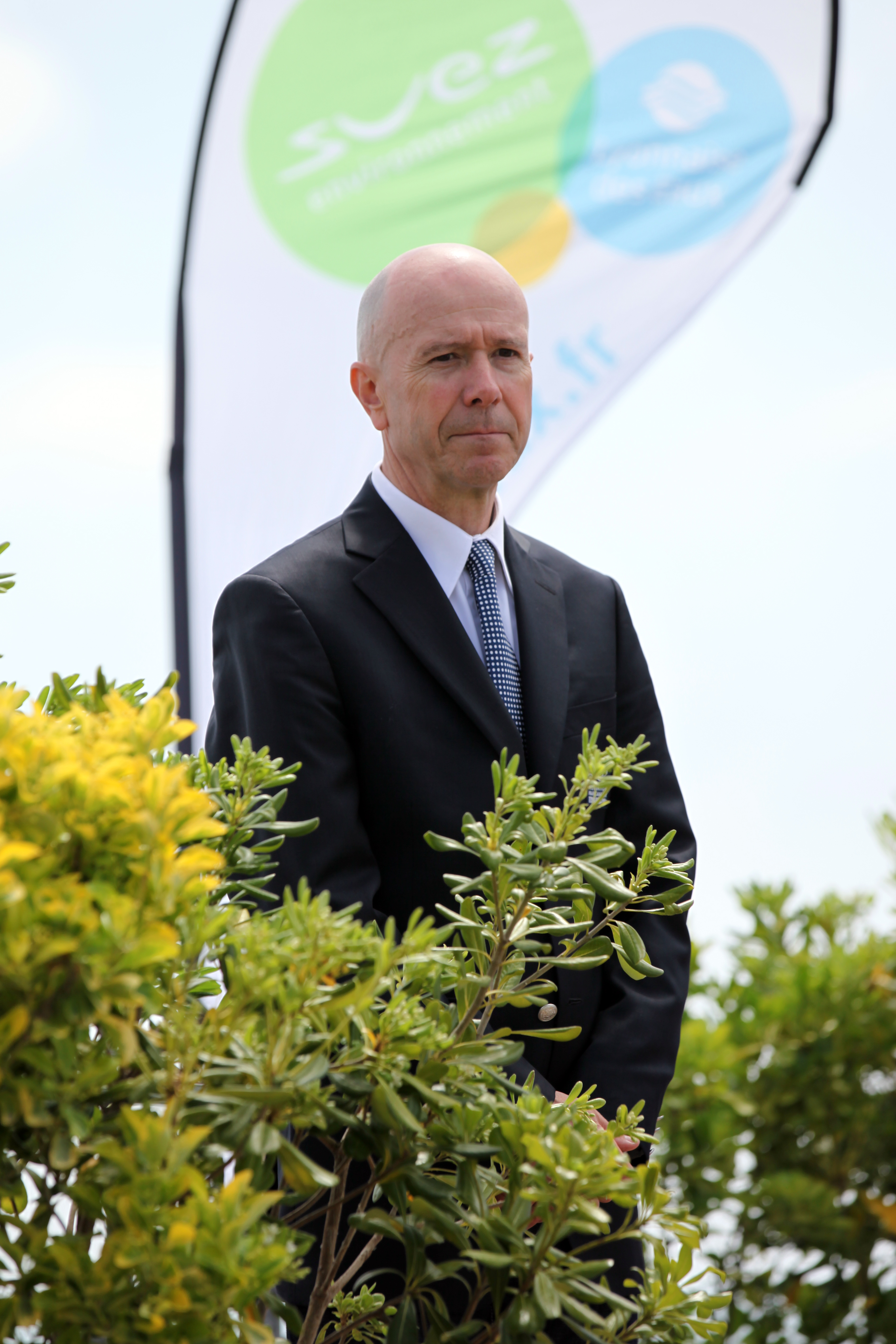
Philippe Lescure, president of the French Triathlon Federation FFTRI in Nice, 2011.

The Grand Prix de Triathlon (Championnat de France des Clubs Division 1 (Triathlon D1) or Grand Prix F.F.TRI. - Lyonnaise des Eaux) defines itself as the most outstanding triathlon event in France and attracts numerous international elite triathletes hired by French clubs. The Grand Prix should not be confused with the Coupe de France des Clubs, which is not a circuit but a one-day national championship and in which the clubs admitted to the Grand Prix are obliged to take part.

== Organisation ==
In 2011, the circuit consisted of the following five triathlons: Nice (24 April 2011), Dunkirk (22 May 2011), Paris (9 July 2011), Tours or Tourangeaux (28 August 2011), and La Baule (Triathlon Audencia, 17 September 2011). In 2012 the following five towns will host the Grand Prix:

- Les Sables-d'Olonne: 28 and 29 April 2012 (cancelled after the Super Sprint Prologue contre la Montre due to weather conditions)
- Dunkirk: 20 May 2012
- Toulouse: 16 June 2012
- Paris: 7 July 2012
- Nice (Grand Final): 16 September 2012

According to the official Réglementation Sportive, there should be 16 male and 14 female teams. At the end of the year 2010, however, three female teams (Beauvais, Montpellier, Nantes) and two male teams (Beauvais, Montluçon) withdrew. Beauvais Triathlon decided to boycott the Grand Prix when the French Triathlon Federation (FFTRI) canceled the traditional Triathlon de Beauvais and replaced it with the Triathlon de Nice. As it seems, there were tensions between FFTRI president Philippe Lescure and Beauvais manager Laurent Chopin, who is reported to return to soccer. Besides, French clubs obviously face increasing difficulties hiring foreign elite stars. Two of the Beauvais elite stars, Andrea Hewitt and Delphine Py-Bilot, moved to Poissy and Charleville respectively. Fred Belaubre and Charlotte Morel, however, took a break.

== Qualified Teams 2012 ==
According to the current Réglementation Sportive, there should be again 16 male and 14 female teams. Compared to 2011, the situation has improved and there are now 13 female teams. However, it remains to be seen if the newcomers can catch up to the old elite clubs. Laurent Vidal changed to Beauvais Triathlon and therefore does not take part in the Grand Prix 2012. Frédéric Belaubre, however, left Beauvais Triathlon in order to take part again in the Grand Prix, this time for Saint-Quentin-en-Yvelines. 16 male teams:

- EC Sartrouville: Alistair Brownlee, Jonathan Brownlee, Javier Gómez, David McNamee, Fernando Alarza, Étienne Diemunsch, Mario Mola, Filip Ospaly, Sebastian Rank, Richard Varga.
- Poissy Triathlon: Tony Moulai, Greg Rouault, Bertrand Billiard, Cyril Moreau, Alessandro Fabian, Artem Parienko, Matt Chrabot, Dan Wilson, Daniel Unger, Jérémy Quindos.
- Les Sables Vendée Triathlon: Brad Kahlefeldt, David Hauss, João Silva, Valentin Meshcheryakov, Ivan Vasiliev, Bruno Païs, Anthony Pujades, Pierre Le Corre, Yulian Malyshev, Uxio Abun Ares.
- Saint-Raphaël Triathlon: Dmitry Polyanski, Igor Polyansky, Karl Shaw, Raoul Shaw, Olivier Marceau, Julien Fort, Manuele Canuto, Beau Smith, Tommy Zaferes, Julien Pousson.
- Rouen Triathlon: Aurélien Lebrun, Arnaud Chivot, Robin Moussel, Alberto Casadei, Alberto Alessandroni, Davide Uccellari, Thomas Bishop, David Bishop, Todd Leckie, James Elvery.
- Lagardère Paris Racing: Steffen Justus, William Clarke, Tamas Tóth, Romain Caillet, Grégoire Pallardy, Ludovic Échalard, Pierre Monière, Olivier Philizot, David Bardi.
- Mulhouse Olympique Tri: Daniel Hofer, Clark Ellice, Toumy Degham, Matthew Sharp, Mattia Ceccarelli, Richard Murray, Matthias Steinwandter, Mark Buckingham, Denis Florentin, Antoine Febway.
- TCG 79 Parthenay: Boris Dessenoix, Brendan Sexton, Tony Dodds, Jan Celustka, Simon De Cuyper, Akos Vanek, Stijn Goris, Luca Facchinetti, Eike Carsten Pupkes.
- St Jean de Monts Vendée Triathlon: Brice Daubord, Yohann Vincent, Nicolas Alliot, Alexander Bryukhankov, Kris Gemmell, Ryan Sissons, Ivan Tutukin, Gavin Noble, Anton Ruanova, Anton Chuchko.
- Baie de Somme Triathlon: Gabor Faldum, Tony Baheux, Miguel Arraiolos, Bryan Keane, Duarte Marques, Stas Krylov, Sergey Yakovlev, Fabien Guérineau, Massimo De Ponti, Aaron Royle, Jorge Naranjo Vichot.
- Metz Triathlon: Cédric Oesterle, Anthony Pannier, Théo Rebeyrotte, Nils Frommhold, Gregor Buchholz, Andrew Russel, Maurice Clavel, Jordan Rouyer, Charles Martin, Jessy Michel.
- Versailles Triathlon: Boris Chambon, Fabien Combaluzier, Audric Lucini, Benoît Recouvreur, Jonathan Tryoen, Gordon Benson, Andrea De Ponti, Kristof Kiraly, Franz Löschke, Stefan Zachaeus, Ricardo Hernandez.
- Ste Geneviève Triathlon: Vincent Luis, Grégoire Berthon, Andreas Schilling, Andrey Bryukhankov, Aubin Fouchet, Matthieu Marteau, Denis Vasiliev, Rodrigo Gonzalez, Danilo Brustolon.
- Vesoul Triathlon: Alexandre Maire, Jonathan Lardier, Vincent Stragapede, Danylo Sapunov, Yegor Martynenko, Aaron Harris, Andrea Secchiero, Peter Bajai, Ben Allen, Davide Bargellini, Petr Bures, Cyril Pochon.
- Saint-Quentin-en-Yvelines: Frédéric Belaubre, Thomas André, Anthony Chassery, Ghislain Hervé, Léo Inostroza, Marek Jaskolka, Guillaume Montoisy, Aymeric Petel, Balasz Pocsai, Romain Pozzo di Borgo.
- La Rochelle: Nicolas Billet, Matthew Gunby, James Lock, Vincent Migné, Frédéric Pierrat, Lionel Roye, Valentin Rouvier, Jérémy Savio, Alfred Torok.

13 female teams:

- Poissy Triathlon: Jessica Harrison, Carole Péon, Erin Densham, Andrea Hewitt, Jodie Stimpson, Kerry Lang, Kate McIlroy, Kathrin Müller, Bérengère Abraham, Rachel Klamer.
- Charleville Tri Ardennes: Hollie Avil, Anja Dittmer, Olga Dmitrieva, Karolien Geerts, Sarah Groff, Vicky Holland, Emma Moffatt, Delphine Py-Bilot, Marie Rabie, Alexandra Razarenova, Doumic Letot, Katrien Verstuyft.
- TCG 79 Parthenay: Felicity Abram, Emma Jackson, Laurie Belkadie, Ainhoa Murua, Nicky Samuels, Non Stanford, Debbie Tanner, Alice Betto, Gaia Peron, Margit Vanek.
- TC Châteauroux 36: Melanie Annaheim, Ricarda Lisk, Svenja Bazlen, Kathy Tremblay, Alexandra Cassan-Ferrier, Julie Nivoix, Clémentine Kauffman, Alia Cardinale, Laetitia Moreau, Vanessa Raw.
- Lagardère Paris Racing: Emmie Charayron, Fabienne Saint Louis, Rebecca Robisch, Justine Guérard, Pauline Purro, Daria Pletikapa, Rebecca Kingsford, Manon Miranda, Sonia Die.
- Stade Poitevin Triathlon: Felicity Sheedy-Ryan, Jessica Leroux, Holly Lawrence, Lois Rosindale, Laetitia Lantz, Tamsyn Moana-Veale, Mariya Shorets, Charlotte Lancereau, Inna Tsyganok, Sara Vilic.
- Saint-Raphaël Triathlon: Annamaria Mazzetti, Camille Donat, Anne Tabarant, Greta Horvath, Daniela Chmet, Anastasiya Polyanskaya, Lyubov Ivanovskaya, Caroline Lopez, Catherine Pickthall.
- Saint Avertin Sports Tri 37 (SASTRI 37): Monika Oražem, Abbie Thorrington, Ine Couckuyt, Hannah Drewett, Elena Maria Petrini, Alessia Orla, Tamara Stonova, Anna Godoy Contreras, Marine Echevin, Pauline Moniere.
- Brive Limousin Triathlon: Aurélie Ajzenberg, Emma Davis, Julie Del Corral, Lucy Hall, Linde Herreman, Charlotte McShane, Giorgia Priarone, Céline Puydebois, Veronica Signorini, Carla Elena Stampfli.
- Tri Val de Gray: Barbara Riveros, Anaïs Robin, Fabienne Hébert, Marie-Clémence Prat, Sandrine Fariello, Ashleigh Gentle, Anais Verguet-Moniz, Elizabeth May, Faustine Chabod, Marine Brisard, Gisele Bertucci.
- Issy Les Moulineaux Triathlon: Linda Guinoiseau, Isabelle Ferrer, Juliette Coudrey, Camille Cierpik, Léonie Périault, Céline Viaud, Marina Damlaimcourt, Carolina Routier, Ashlee Bailie, Victoriya Kachan.
- Tri Sud 18: Sandrine Delannoy, Aurélie Gauliard, Sabrina Godard, Natacha Lacorre, Hellie Salthouse, Grace Musgrove, Camille Duvauchel, Solène Madrange.
- Noyon Puissance 3: -.*

== Points System ==
Each of the 16 male and 14 female teams nominates seven triathletes for the whole season, of whom five triathletes actually have to take part in the race. In 2011 at least one triathlete in each team must be French (two from 2012 onwards). For each of the five competitions the ranking of the clubs is determined by the three so-called triathlètes classants l'equipe, i.e. the individual positions of the three best triathletes of each club are added and the club with the lowest sum is the winner, and so forth. The ranks of the rest of each team are irrelevant. For the whole circuit, however, the clubs are assigned points on the basis of the club ranking of each individual competition. The best male team, for instance, receives 20 points for the first place in one competition etc.

For the season 2011 the French triathlon Federation FFTRI was not only unable to secure the right number of clubs, some clubs, especially female elite teams, seem to have difficulties in hiring five elite triathletes for each race:

- At the opening triathlon in Nice (24 April 2011), Charleville Tri Ardennes (CTA) was unable to start with five runners and should have been disqualified, as Alexandra Razarenova did not start.
- In Dunkirk, for instance, Stade Poitevin had to recur to Natalia Shliakhtenko although she was no member of the club any more and her name was not included in the start lists.
- In Paris, TRI Olympique Club Cessonnais had to do without the obligatory fifth triathlete because the only French triathlete among the five nominated runners, Alexia Bigot, did not start (DNS). According to the Réglementation Sportive any club which does not take part in alle five triathlons of the circuit (with all the five obligatory triathletes) should be excluded from the Grand Prix.
- Apart from the three decisive runners (the triathlètes classants l'équipe), several clubs nominate only foreign juniors without significant ITU competition experience.
- Sometimes even the three triathlètes classants l'équipe of smaller clubs are foreign juniors. The three best triathletes of Saint Avertin Sports Tri 37, for instance, were foreign juniors: Monika Oražem (24th in the individual ranking), Horvath (35th), and Hannah Drewett (38th). Hannah Drewett, a British junior, even managed to place 38th among the elite without any prior ITU competition experience.
- Lagardère for instance completely depends on Emmie Charayron. With this top triathlete, the club regularly achieves medals, without her it is among the last clubs of the ranking.
- The official start lists often turn out to be inaccurate. At Tours (28 August 2011), for instance, TOCC nominated five unknown French triathletes, but at the race there were three internationally well known U23 triathletes competing in the World Championship Series: Zsófia Tóth, who had announced her participation long before on Twitter, Charlotte McShane, and Mariya Shorets.
- Many triathletes seem to be unhappy about the fact that, paradoxically, the French Club Championship is no team championship but is exclusively based upon the individual ranking of the club's best two or three top triathletes, i.e. the foreign elite stars. At Tours (28 August 2011), for the first time, a slight relay element was introduced. The first two and the second two triathletes of each club form a team and the slower triathlete of each sub team will give the start signal to the following teammate. The fifth triathlete of each club is running alone without a slowdown colleague. For the dominant Grand Prix teams with three foreign guest stars this might turn out disadvantageous because the third top star will be slowed down unless the club has a fourth top star. At Tours, Sartrouville could defend its leading position only thanks to Jonathan Brownlee, who, as the fifth solo runner, could easily outdo all competitors and win the gold medal for his team.

In general, it seems that the official Rules (Règlementation sportive) are not strictly applied. E.g. at the official podium ceremony in La Baule (17 September 2011), Saint Raphaël Tri (Anna Tabarant, Polyanskaya, Ivanovskaya, Camille Donat and Daniela Chmet) did not turn up. According to the rules, this should have led to a penalty. Nevertheless, the club received all 11 points for the third place in La Baule.

== Foreigners' Dominance ==
The high amount of international guest stars has always raised criticism in France. On the one hand, FFTRI is proud to gather some of the best elite stars of the world, on the other hand the rankings clearly show that the French triathletes are a small and irrelevant minority among the Grand Prix participants. In the old Réglementation Sportive of the season 2007/08, the importance of the foreign guest stars was still restricted because among the three triathlètes classants l'équipe only one (EU) foreigner was allowed.

=== Season 2010 ===
The rankings of the opening Grand Prix triathlon held at Dunkirk on 23 May 2010 give the following picture.

- According to the individual female ranking, among the best 10 female triathletes there were only 2 French triathletes, among the best 20 triathletes there were only 4 French triathletes, and among all 70 female participants there were only 26 French triathletes. On the other side, among the 9 participants who did not finish (DNF) there were 7 French triathletes.
- In the club ranking the foreigners' dominance is even more obvious. As said before, there were 14 female teams and for the club ranking only the three best triathletes of each club, the triathlètes classants l'équipe, are relevant. Thus there should have been 42 triathlètes classants l'équipe, but OSML Natation-Triathlon had three DNF triathletes and so in this club there were only two triathlètes classants l'équipe. This means that at Dunkirk for the club ranking there were only 41 female triathletes, of whom only 11 were French. And of these 11 French triathletes, only 5 belonged to the best 11 clubs. In other words: among the 33 triathlètes classants l'équipe of the 11 best clubs, there were only 11 French triathletes.
- In five out of 14 clubs there were no French triathletes at all among the three best triathleteas, which means for five clubs the club ranking was based exclusively upon the foreigners' positions. In seven teams there was only one French triathlete among the three triathlètes classants l'equipe of these clubs, but they were the third of the three, and thus had little relevance for the club ranking.
- The second best club at Dunkirk, Tri Club Chateauroux 36, achieved this top position only thanks to its foreign stars: Magali Di Marco, Svenja Bazlen, and Ricarda Lisk, and even the two other triathletes of this team were foreigners: Melanie Annaheim (Switgzerland) und Alia Cardinale (Costa Rica), which will be forbidden by the Grand Prix rules from autumn 2010 on. Tri Club Nantais neither had a French triathlete in its team nor could it nominate five triathletes.
- Not only do the foreign guest stars outnumber the French participants and play the decisive role: the French triathletes, too, often lack any relation with the club they represent. The bronze-medalist club of Dunkirk 2010 and the overall Grand Prix winner of the year 2009, Beauvais Tri, for instance, signed four international elite stars on, Andrea Hewitt, Vicky Holland, Hollie Avil and Anja Dittmer, plus the Southern French triathletes Delphine Py Bilot from Montpellier and Charlotte Morel from Boulouris, both of whom live and train far away from Beauvais.
- The male ranking confirms the foreign dominance. Among the three qualifying triathletes (triathlètes classants l'équipe) of the 5 best clubs, i.e. among the 15 most relevant triathletes there were only 2 French triathletes. In the individual ranking, which is independent of the triathletes' status as triathlètes classants l'équipe, the discrepancy between the percentage of French participants and their performance is evident: 50 out of 84 triathletes are foreigners, but among the best 40 participants there are only 7 French triathletes, but e.g. 8 Russians.

=== Season 2011 ===
To some extent this season was irregular. On the one hand, traditional guest stars withdrew and concentrated on ITU races for the 2012 Olympics qualification. On the other hand, five clubs which had already been admitted to the Grand Prix, among which the female gold medalist and male silver medalist Beauvais, declared to withdraw in autumn 2010. So in 2011 there were only 11 instead of 14 female teams. The opening triathlon in Nice (24 April 2011) proved the undiminished foreigners' dominance in spite of the new regulation according to which each club has to be present with five triathletes at each competition with at least one French triathlete among them.

- Among the three best triathletes (triathlètes classants l'èquipe) of the winning team Sartrouville there is no French national: Alistair Brownlee, Jonathan Brownlee and Javier Gómez.
- Among the 30 triathlètes classants l'èquipe of the best ten clubs there are only seven French triathletes.
- Five of the ten best clubs do not have any French triathletes among their three triathlètes classants l'èquipe.
- The individual ranking is indicative, too. among the top ten triathletes there are only two French triathletes, among the top thirty there are only seven French triathletes.
- On the whole there were 46 French and 44 non French participants. Among the last thirty participants (DNF included), however, there are 25 French triathletes.
- In the female ranking the situation is slightly better because many traditional guest stars do not participate in the 2011 circuit. In the individual ranking there are five French top-ten triathletes, among the top thirty female triathletes there are 13 French triathletes.
- Among the last thirty triathletes (DNF included) there are only 16 French triathletes.
- Among the nine triathlètes classants l'èquipe of the best three clubs, there are four French triathletes: Carole Péon, Emmie Charayron and Julie Nivoix.
