= Hannah Drewett =

English triathlete

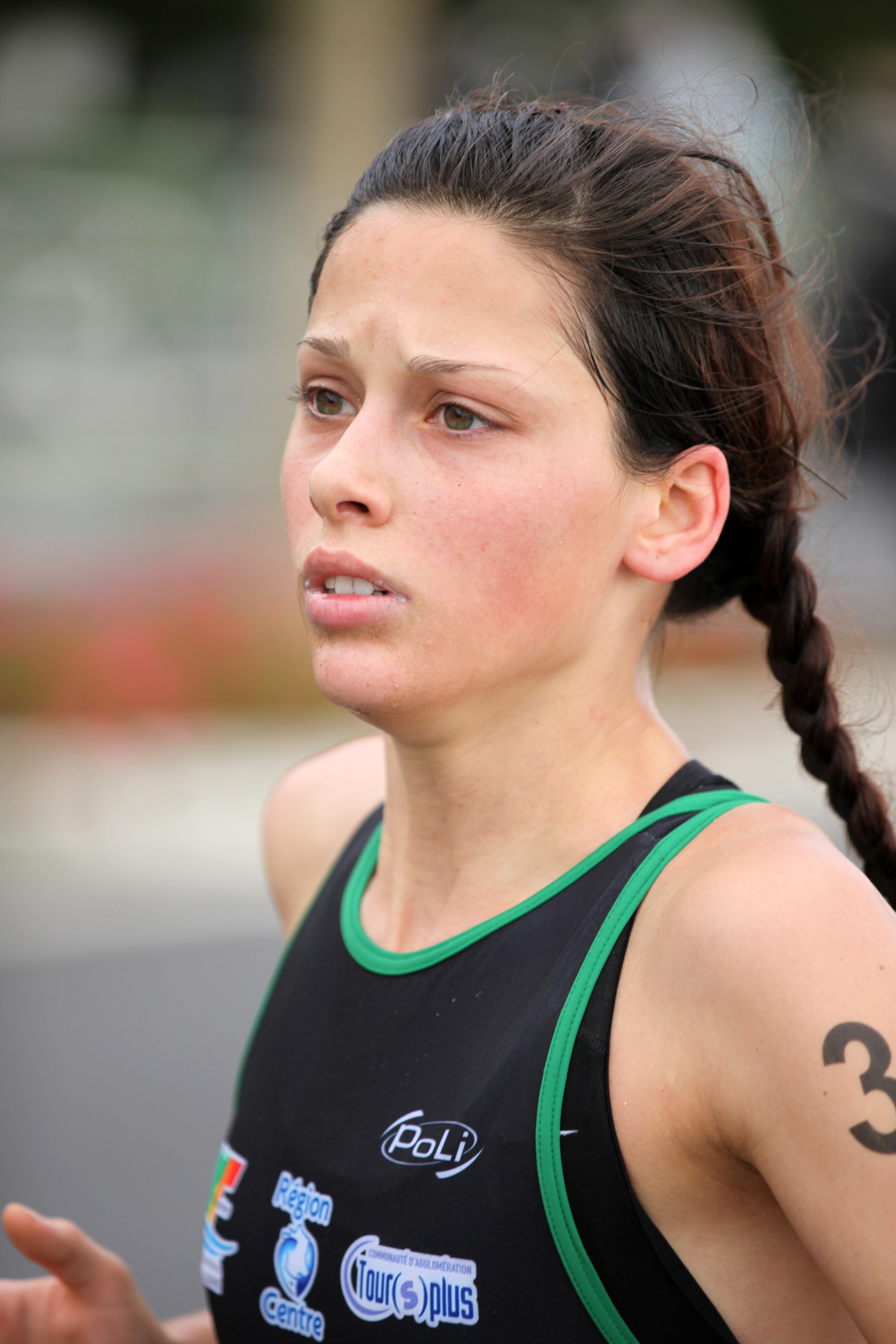
Hannah Drewett at the GP Grand Final in La Baule, 2011.

Hannah Rose Drewett is an English professional triathlete.

== Sports career ==
From the age of 11, Drewett took part in swimming competitions and at 18 she turned to triathlon.

Since 2012/13, Drewett is a BSc Sport and Physical Exercise student at the University of Leeds. She is a member of the British Triathlon Federation Performance squad, however her name does not appear among the World Class Podium Potential Squad as published by the British triathlon federation.

In France, Drewett has taken part in the prestigious Grand Prix de Triathlon circuit since 2011 representing the club of St Avertin, TRI SAS 37. In 2013, Drewett took part in all five competitions and placed 33rd in Dunkirk (26 May 2013), 16th in Les Sables d’Olonne (9 June 2013), 26th in Saint Jean de Monts (22 June 2013), 28th in Sartrouville (1 September 2013) and 28th in Nice (29 September 2013). In Saint Jean and Sartrouville, Drewett was the best triathlete of her team, while in Les Sables d’Olonne she was the only SAS TRI 37 athlete who was not disqualified.

== ITU competitions ==
In 2012, Drewett took part in her first ITU competition, placing 21st in two European Cups in Quarteira and Banyoles, and 6th in the British Championships.

The following list is based upon the official ITU rankings and the ITU Athletes's Profile Page. Unless indicated otherwise, the following events are triathlons (Olympic Distance) and refer to the Elite category.

Date	Competition	Place	Rank
2012-06-17	World Cup	Banyoles	30
2013-04-06	European Cup	Quarteira	21
2013-05-05	European Cup	Banyoles	21
2013-07-13	British Championships	Liverpool	6
