= Lois Rosindale =

English triathlete

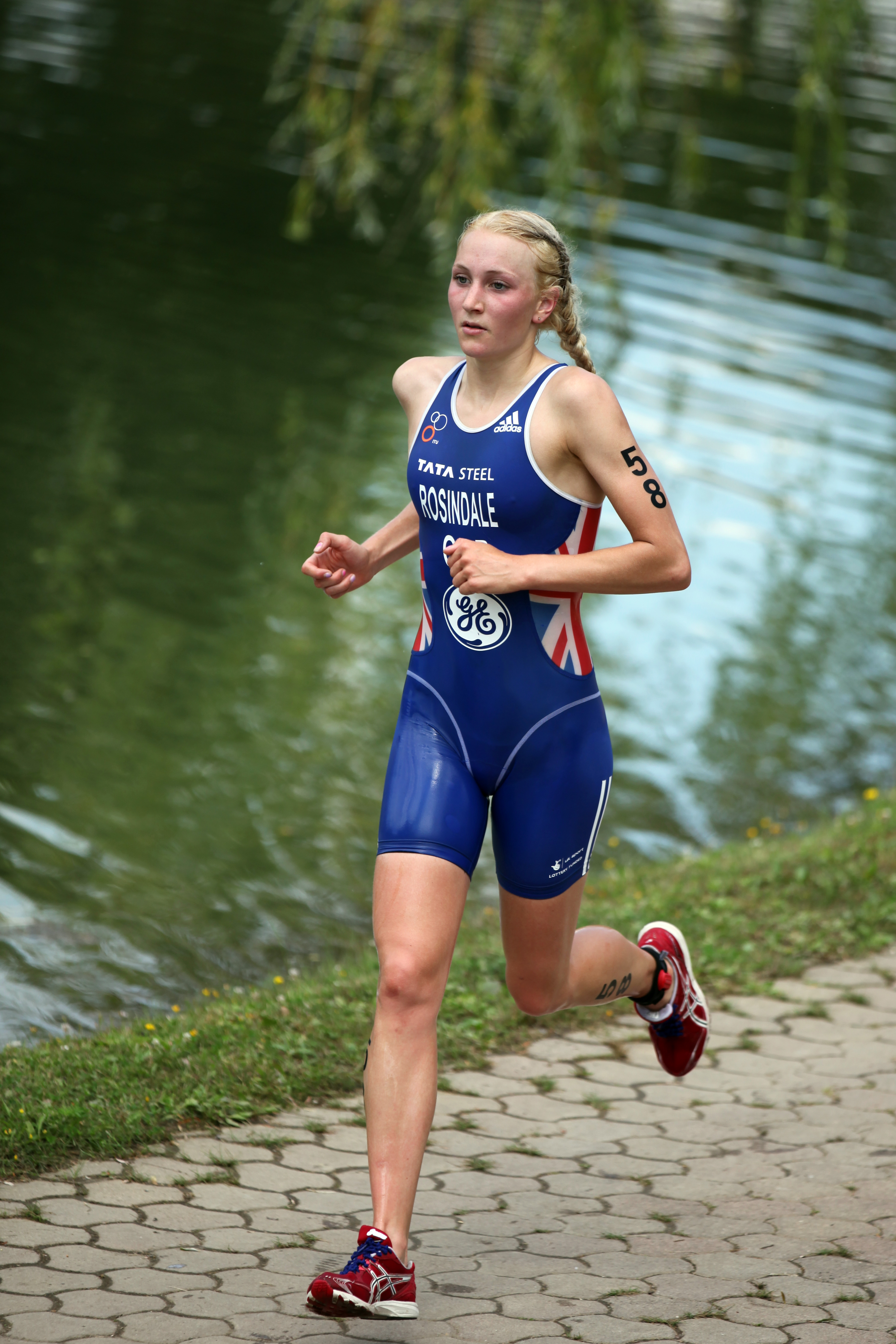
Lois Rosindale at the World Cup triathlon in Tiszaújváros, 2011.

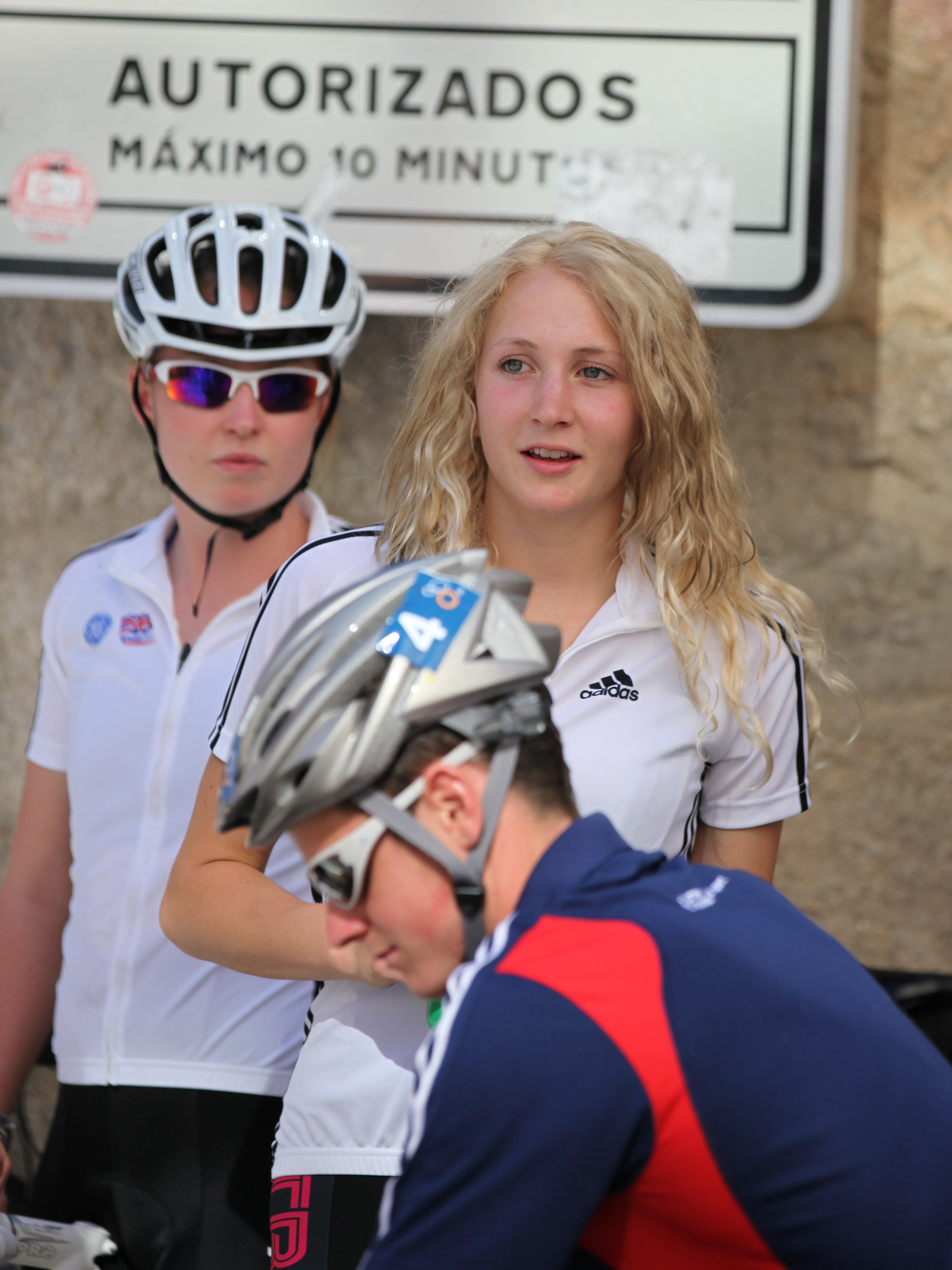
Lois Rosindale together with Alistair Brownlee, watching the Junior Championships in Pontevedra, 2011.

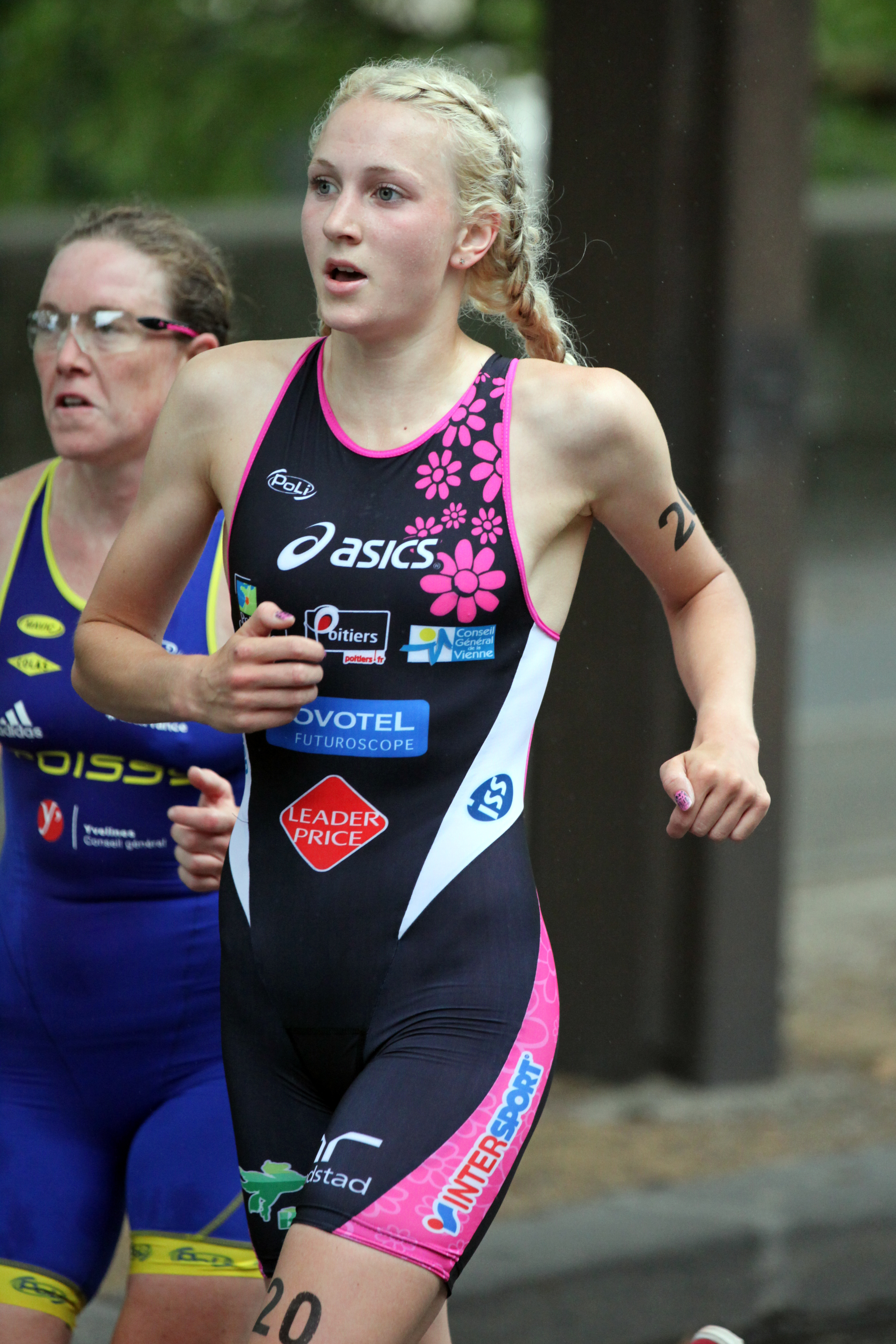
Lois Rosindale surpassing Jessica Harrison at the Club Championship triathlon in Paris, 2011.

Lois Rosindale (born 17 April 1990 in Leeds) is an English professional triathlete, 2011 British Champion, and 2010 U23 Duathlon Vice World Champion. Rosindale is a member of the High Performance Triathlon Squad based in Leeds.

== Sports career ==
As late as in 2009, Rosindale turned to triathlon and won the British Universities Triathlon Championships. In 2010, Rosindale placed third at the European U23 Duathlon Championships and second at the U23 World Championships. In 2011, she placed 25th at the European Elite Championships. At the Mix Relay, however, the British elite triathletes did not take part although they would have achieved an excellent result thanks to the winners of the individual ranking Alistair Brownlee and Jonathan Brownlee, both from Leeds like Rosindale.

In France, Rosindale takes part in the prestigious Club Championship Series Lyonnaise des Eaux. In 2011, Rosindale represents the club Stade Poitevin. At the opening triathlon in Nice (24 April 2011), however, Rosindale did not finish the race, and at the second triathlon in Dunkirk (22 May 2011) she was not present. Stade Poitevin had to nominate Natalia Shliakhtenko in order to have five triathletes although she was not a member of the club any more and her name did not show in the start lists.

In 2010, Rosindale represented the club Montpellier Agglo Tri and took part in four of the five triathlons of the circuit. At Dunkirk (23 May 2010) she placed 29th and was not among the three triathlètes classants l'équipe, but in Paris (18 July 2010) she placed 8th and thus was among the club's top three (behind Bárbara Riveros Díaz and Non Stanford), at Tourangeoux (29 August 2010) she placed 8th again and was among the three triathlètes classants l'équipe (behind Bárbara Riveros Díaz and Liz Blatchford). At the Grand Final in La Baule (Triathlon Audencia, 18 September 2010) Rosindale placed 18th and again she was the third of the club's top three (Bárbara Riveros Díaz, Liz Blatchford).

Rosindale is a Sports and Exercise student at the Leeds Metropolitan University and represents Leeds & Bradford TC. Rosindals's coach is Jack Maitland.

== ITU competitions ==
In 2010, Rosindale took part in four ITU events and achieved two medals. The following list is based upon the official ITU rankings and the ITU Athletes's Profile Page. Unless indicated otherwise, the following events are triathlons (Olympic Distance) and refer to the Elite category.

Date	Competition	Place	Rank
2010-04-30	Duathlon European Championships (U23)	Nancy	3
2010-05-28	FISU 10th World University Championships	Valencia	15
2010-08-08	World Cup	Tiszaújváros	17
2010-09-03	Duathlon World Championships (U23)	Edinburgh	2
2011-05-29	Premium European Cup	Brasschaat	13
2011-06-25	European Championships	Pontevedra	25
2011-07-24	European Cup	Geneva	5
2011-08-14	World Cup	Tiszaújváros	25
