= Elena Maria Petrini =

Italian triathlete (born 1992)

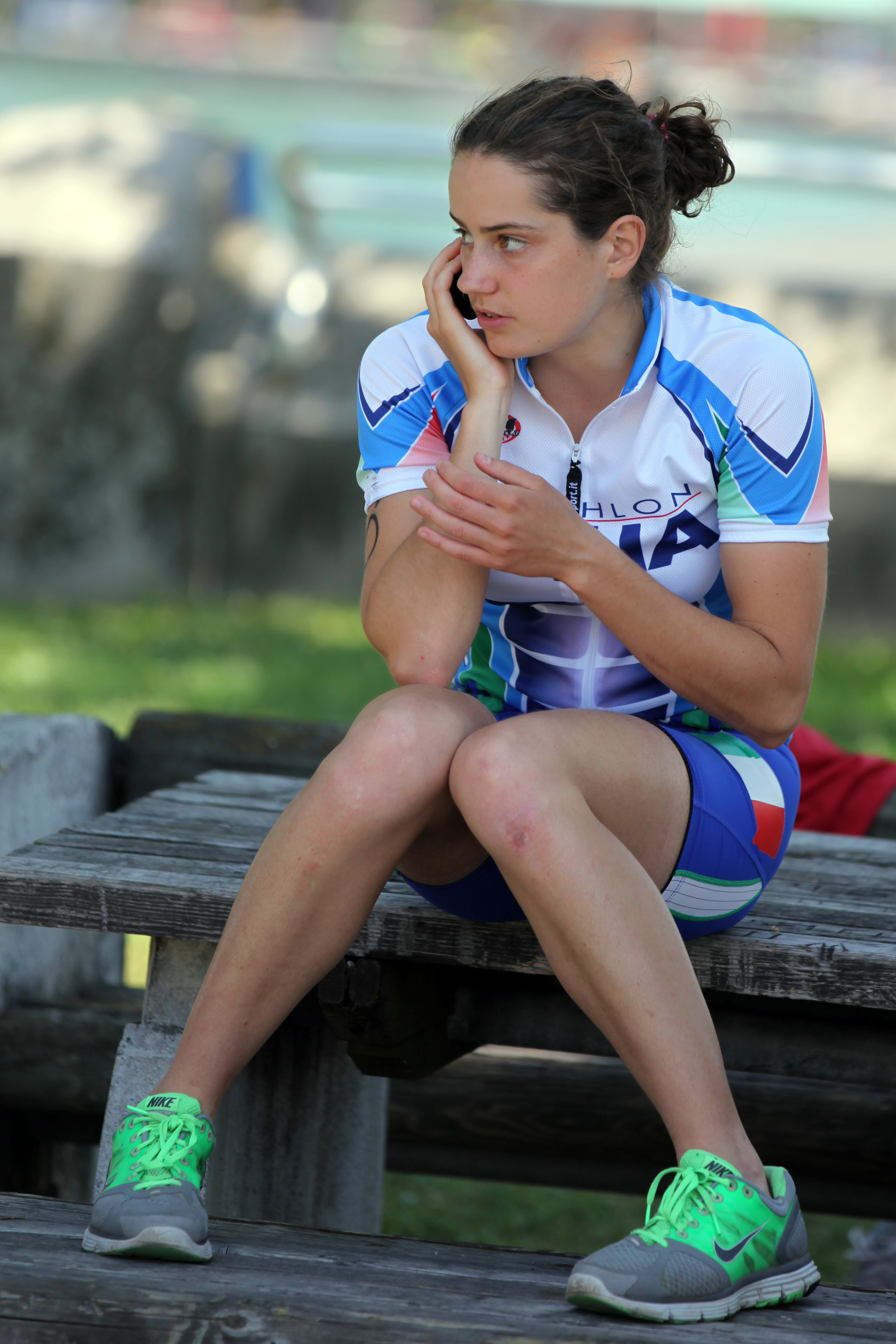
- Elena Maria Petrini at the Junior European Cup in Vienna, 2011.

Personal information
- Nationality: Italian
- Born: 11 February 1992 (age 34) Spoleto, Italy

Sport
- Sport: Triathlon
- Club: Fiamme Azzurre

Elena Maria Petrini (born 11 February 1992) is an Italian professional triathlete, National Junior Aquathlon and National Junior Triathlon Champion, and Junior Aquathlon World Champion of 2010.

== Biography ==
In 2010, Petrini won gold medals at both the National Triathlon and Aquathlon Championships, as well as the Italian Junior Cup. At the Everyman's Sprint Triathlon 2010, Petrini again won gold, and finished the year by winning the gold medal at the Aquathlon World Championships in Budapest.

In 2011, Petrini won the bronze medal at the European Junior Duathlon Championships, and placed 4th at the European Junior Triathlon Championships. She also took part that year in the French Club Championship Series Lyonnaise des Eaux, representing the club SASTRI 37 (Saint-Avertin Sports). At the opening triathlon in Nice (24 April 2011), Petrini placed 21st, finishing second within her club.

Petrini lives in Rome and trains at the Olympic high-performance centre Acquacetosa. Her coaches are Alessandro Bottoni and Piergiorgio Conti.

== ITU Competitions ==
The following list is based upon the official ITU rankings and the ITU Athletes's Profile Page. Unless indicated otherwise, the following events are triathlons (Olympic distance) and refer to the Elite category.

Date	Competition	Place	Rank
2010-04-30	Duathlon European Championships (Junior)	Nancy	13
2010-07-03	European Championships (Junior)	Athlone	34
2010-09-08	Dextro Energy World Championship Series, Grand Final: World Championships (Junior)	Budapest	24
2010-09-08	Aquathlon World Championships (Junior)	Budapest	1
2011-04-17	Duathlon European Championships (Junior)	Limerick	3
2011-06-11	Junior European Cup	Vienna	10
2011-06-24	European Championships (Junior)	Pontevedra	4
