= Marina Damlaimcourt =

Spanish triathlete

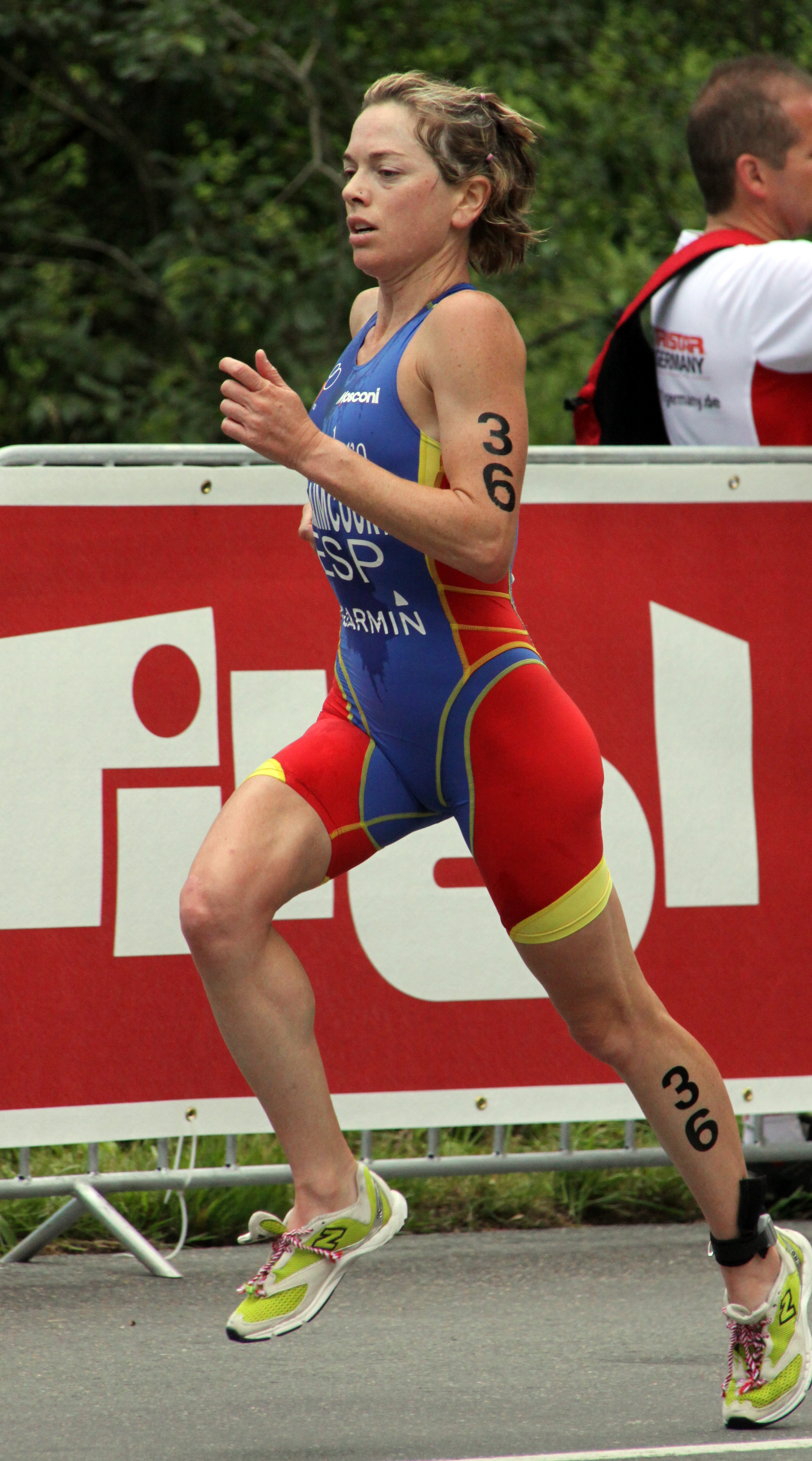
Marina Damlaimcourt at the World Championship Series triathlon in Kitzbühel, 2010.

Marina Damlaimcourt Uceda (born 15 October 1979 in Madrid) is a Spanish professional triathlete, National Triathlon Champion of the year 2008, three times National Aquathlon Champion (2004, 2005, 2010), and member of the National Team.

Marina Damlaimcourt is no. 3 in the Spanish High Performance ranking of the year 2010 (DAR = Deportistas Alto Rendimiento FETRI 2010), and belongs to the high performance centre Centro Alto Rendimiento (CAR) Madrid.

In the eight years from 2003 to 2010, Damlaimcourt has taken part in 46 ITU elite competitions and has achieved 10 top ten positions. At her very first ITU triathlon (Schliersee) Damlaimcourt won the gold medal.

In 2008 and 2009, Marina Damlaimcourt also took part in the prestigious French Club Championship Series Lyonnasise des Eaux representing Poissy Triathlon: in Paris (22 June 2008), Beauvais (6 July 2008), and at the Grand Final in La Baule (21 September 2008) she placed 4th, 9th, and 11th respectively, and in Beauvais (21 June 2009) and Tours (19 July 2010) she placed 9th and 11th.

Damlaimcourt lives in Galapagar, Madrid, and in Spain she represents the club Canal de Isabel II.

== ITU Competitions ==
Unless indicated otherwise the following competitions are triathlons and belong to the Elite category. The following list is based upon the official ITU rankings and the athlete's ITU Profile Page.

Date	Competition	Place	Rank
2003-07-26	European Cup	Schliersee	1
2003-09-14	European Cup	Estoril	6
2003-09-21	World Cup	Madrid	30
2003-10-19	World Cup	Madeira	18
2003-10-25	World Cup	Athens	20
2003-11-23	World Cup	Geelong	22
2004-09-04	World Cup	Hamburg	9
2004-09-19	World Cup	Madrid	DNF
2005-04-16	World Cup	Honolulu	28
2005-04-24	World Cup	Mazatlan	DNF
2005-06-05	World Cup	Madrid	21
2005-07-31	World Cup	Salford	22
2005-08-06	World Cup	Hamburg	10
2005-08-20	European Championships	Lausanne	22
2006-04-23	European Cup	Estoril	5
2006-06-04	BG World Cup	Madrid	10
2006-06-11	BG World Cup	Richards Bay	9
2006-06-23	European Championships	Autun	9
2007-06-03	BG World Cup	Madrid	DNF
2007-09-15	BG World Cup	Beijing	52
2007-10-07	BG World Cup	Rhodes	37
2007-11-04	BG World Cup	Cancun	DNF
2007-12-01	BG World Cup	Eilat	27
2008-04-19	Premium European Cup	Pontevedra	DNF
2008-05-04	BG World Cup	Richards Bay	15
2008-05-10	European Championships	Lisbon	21
2008-05-25	BG World Cup	Madrid	24
2008-06-05	BG World Championships	Vancouver	DNF
2008-09-27	BG World Cup	Lorient	20
2009-04-05	European Cup	Quarteira	5
2009-05-17	Premium European Cup	Pontevedra	DNF
2009-05-31	Dextro Energy World Championship Series	Madrid	18
2009-06-14	European and Pan American Cup and Iberoamerican Championships	Ferrol	2
2009-07-02	European Championships	Holten	DNF
2009-07-11	Dextro Energy World Championship Series	Kitzbuhel	15
2009-07-25	Dextro Energy World Championship Series	Hamburg	DNF
2010-04-11	European Cup	Quarteira	11
2010-04-17	European Cup	Antalya	10
2010-06-05	Dextro Energy World Championship Series	Madrid	33
2010-06-12	Elite Cup	Hy-Vee	32
2010-07-10	World Cup	Holten	19
2010-07-17	Dextro Energy World Championship Series	Hamburg	34
2010-07-24	Dextro Energy World Championship Series	London	32
2010-08-08	World Cup	Tiszaújváros	12
2010-08-14	Dextro Energy World Championship Series	Kitzbuhel	39
2010-10-10	World Cup	Huatulco	13

BG = the sponsor British Gas · DNF = did not finish · DNS = did not start
