= Katrien Verstuyft =

Belgian triathlete

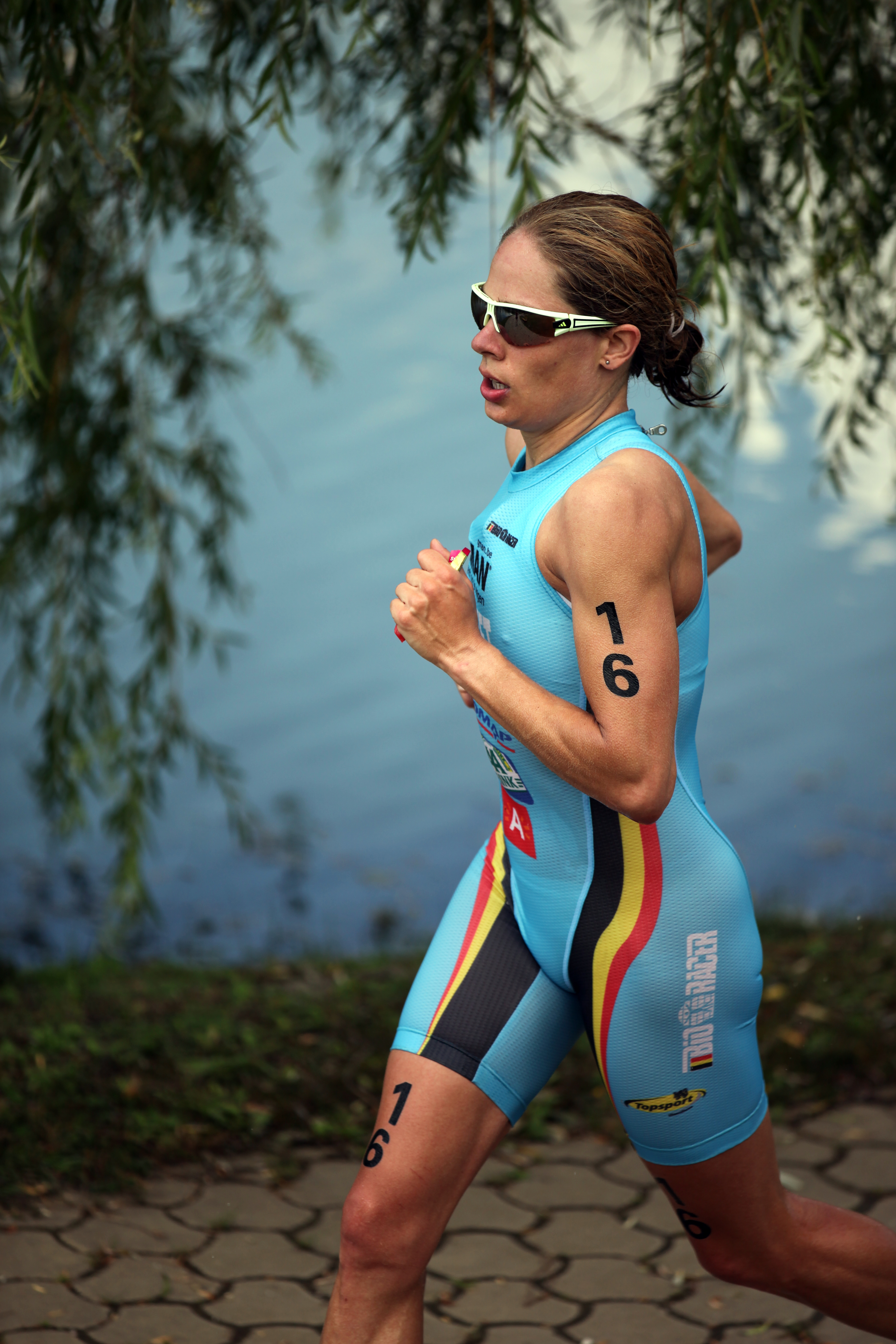
Katrien Verstuyft at the World Cup triathlon in Tiszaújváros, 2011.

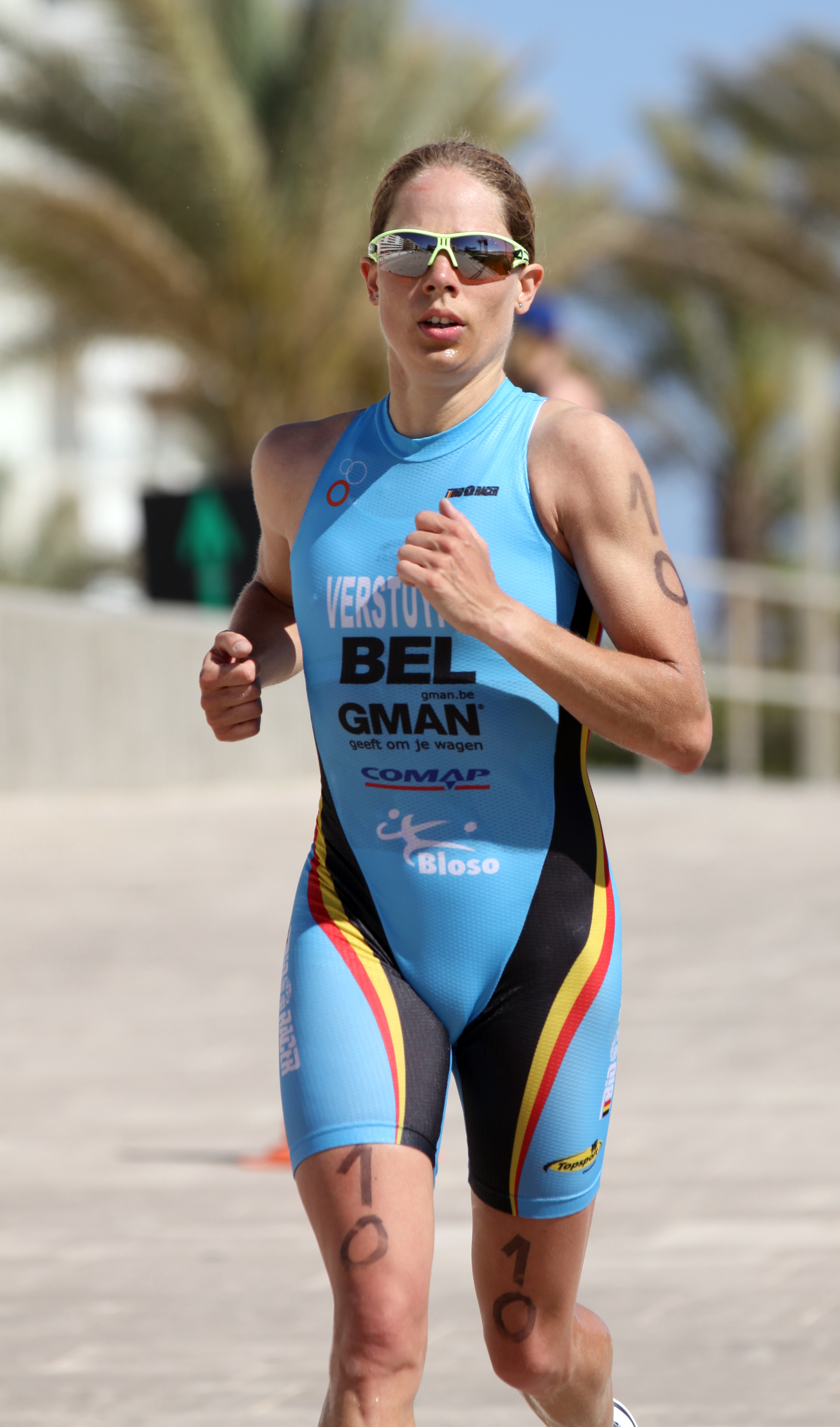
Katrien Verstuyft at the European Cup triathlon in Quarteira, 2011.

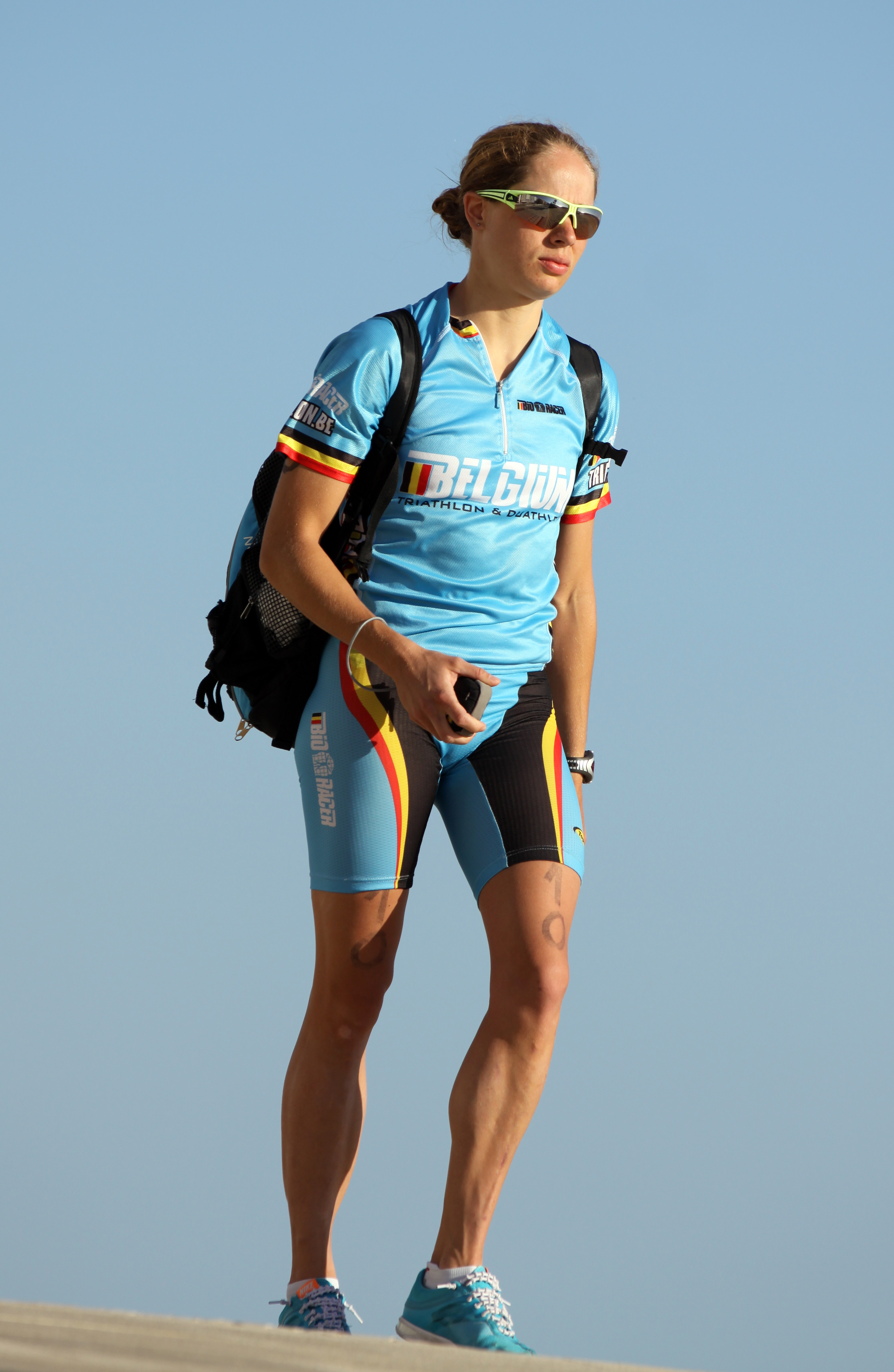
Katrien Verstuyft after the race in Quarteira, 2011.

Katrien Verstuyft (born 21 July 1982 in Antwerp), is a Belgian professional triathlete, National Champion (Sprint, Olympic Distance, and Team) of the year 2009, and member of the National Team.

Katrien Verstuyft lives in Mortsel and represents the local club ATRIAC.

In 2009, Verstyuft also took part in the French Club Championship Series Lyonnaise des Eaux, representing Charleville Tri Ardennes. At Tours/Tourangeaux (19 July 2009), Paris (30 August 2009) and at the Grand Final in La Baule (27 September 2009) she placed 18th, 14th, and 18th respectively. In 2010, she did not compete in this French circuit though the club still enumerates her among its elite athletes. Tri Ardennes almost exclusively depends on foreign elite stars like Olga Dmitrieva and Emma Moffatt. In 2010 it could nominate only one French female triathlete for only one competition, i.e. Jeanne Collonge at Dunkirk.

== ITU Competitions ==
In the two years from 2009 to 2010, Verstuyft took part in 11 ITU competitions and achieved 2 top ten positions. In April 2011, Verstuyft placed 11th and 8th at the European Cup triathlons in Antalya and Quarteira respectively.

The following list is based upon the official ITU rankings and the athlete's ITU Profile Page. Unless indicated otherwise the following competitions are triathlons (Olympic Distance) and belong to the Elite category.

Date	Competition	Place	Rank
2009-07-02	European Championships	Holten	25
2009-10-25	Premium European Cup	Alanya	14
2010-05-23	European Cup	Strathclyde	11
2010-06-05	Dextro Energy World Championship Series	Madrid	41
2010-06-12	Premium European Cup	Pontevedra	6
2010-07-03	European Championships	Athlone	DNF
2010-07-10	World Cup	Holten	17
2010-07-17	Dextro Energy World Championship Series	Hamburg	33
2010-08-08	World Cup	Tiszaújváros	DNF
2010-10-24	Premium European Cup	Alanya	13
2010-10-24	Premium European Cup	Eilat	1
2011-04-03	European Cup	Antalya	11
2011-04-09	European Cup	Quarteira	8
2011-05-08	World Cup	Monterrey	8
2011-05-29	Premium European Cup	Brasschaat	16
2011-06-04	Dextro Energy World Championship Series	Madrid	30
2011-06-24	European Championships	Pontevedra	13
2011-07-10	World Cup	Edmonton	14
2011-08-06	Dextro Energy World Championship Series	London	27
2011-08-14	World Cup	Tiszaújváros	8

DNF = did not finish · DNS = did not start
