= Delphine Py-Bilot =

French triathlete (born 1979)

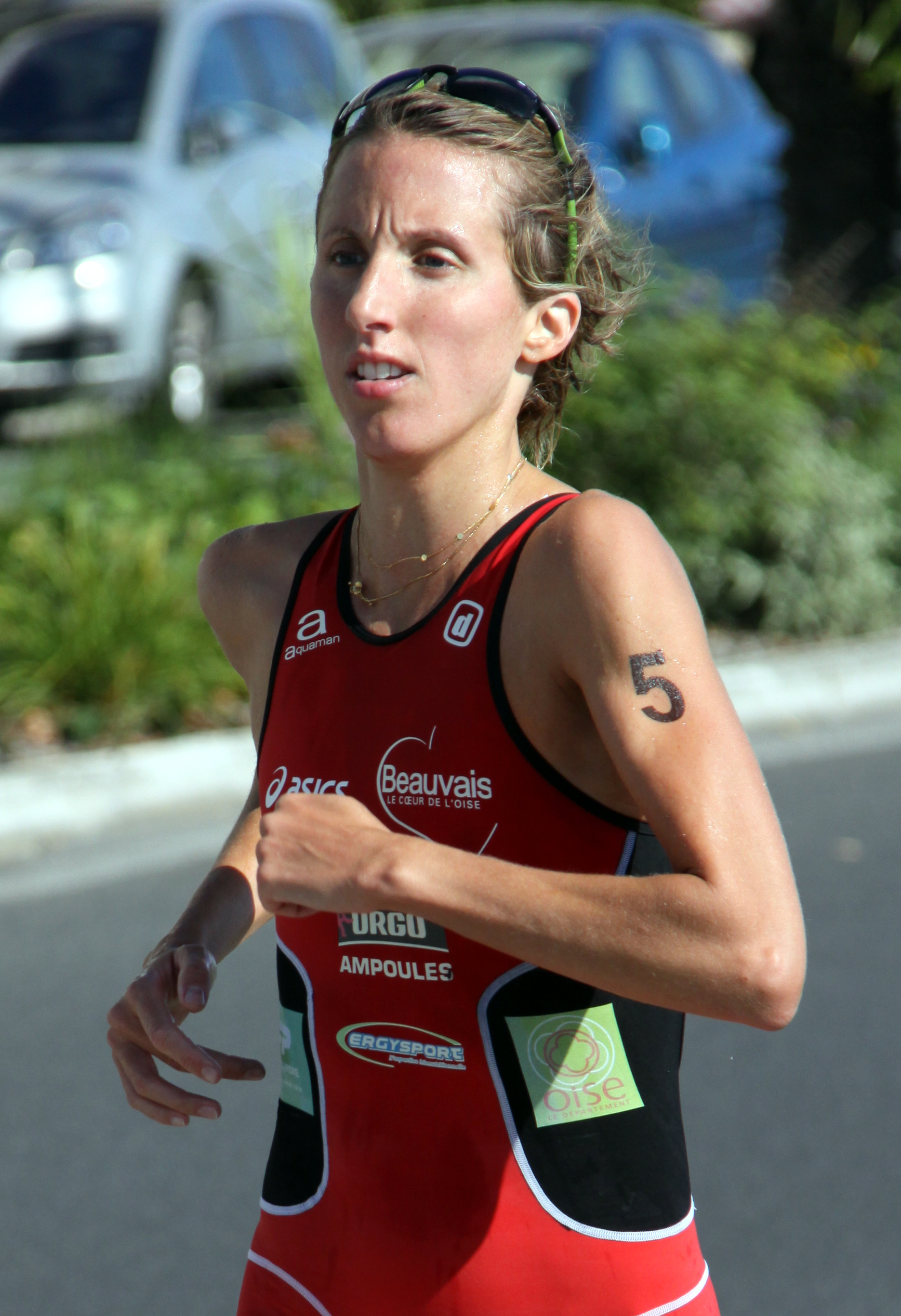
- Delphine Py representing the winning club Beauvais at the Grand Final in La Baule, 2009.
- Born: January 27, 1979 (age 47); Montpellier, France
- Occupations: Athlete, Teacher
- Known for: Running triathlons

Delphine Py-Bilot (born 27 January 1979 in Montpellier) is a French professional triathlete.

== Career ==
Delphine Py-Bilot made her international breakthrough in 1999 when she won the bronze medal at the Junior European Championships in Madeira and placed fifth at the Junior World Championships in Montreal. By then she was a well known triathlete in France, having won the French Championships in all age categories: in 1994 in the class «minime», in 1996 as «cadette», and in 1998 and 1999 as a «junior».

Since 2008 she has not taken part in ITU races but she was still present at international events. At the Mazda London Triathlon (2 August 2009), for instance, she placed 7th and outdid younger top elite triathletes like Jodie Stimpson (8th), Sophie Coleman (9th), and Maxine Seear (10th). The race was won by Helen Jenkins Tucker and, though not being an ITU triathlon, always attracts top elite athletes.

Since 2003 Delphine Py represented the club Beauvais Triathlon in the prestigious French Club Championship Series Lyonnaise des Eaux and, apart from Charlotte Morel and Delphine Pelletier she was the only French triathlete in the female team of this club, which almost exclusively relied on its international guest stars like Andrea Hewitt and in 2009 won both the Club Championship Series and the national Club Championship at Gruissan. In 2010, Beauvais Triathlon again won the Club Championship Series Lyonnaise des Eaux and placed 2nd at the National Club Championship in Parthenay (Coupe de France des Clubs de Triathlon). In 2011, however, the club decided to boycott this famous circuit and in 2011 Delphine Py will represent Charleville Triathlon Ardennes, taking part in the Championship for her last time.

== ITU Competitions ==
The following list is based upon the official ITU rankings and the Athlete's Profile Page. Unless indicated otherwise, all events are triathlons (Olympic Distance) and belong to the Elite category.

Date	Competition	Place	Rank
1997-07-05	European Championships (Junior)	Vuokatti	18
1998-07-04	European Championships (Junior)	Velden	7
1998-08-30	World Championships (Junior)	Lausanne	18
1999-07-03	European Championships (Junior)	Funchal	3
2000-07-08	European Championships	Stein	11
2000-08-06	World Cup	Tiszaújváros	20
2001-05-13	World Cup	Rennes	22
2001-11-04	World Cup	Cancun	15
2002-04-27	World Cup	Saint Petersburg	36
2002-06-02	European Cup	Zundert	14
2002-07-06	European Championships	Györ	33
2002-07-28	World Cup	Tiszaújváros	35
2002-09-21	World Cup	Nice	35
2003-06-01	European Cup	Zundert	8
2004-02-21	Oceania Championships	Devonport	DNF
2004-04-18	European Championships	Valencia	36
2005-07-16	Premium World Cup	Holten	15
2005-10-15	European Cup	Palermo	DNF
2006-04-23	European Cup	Estoril	18
2006-08-20	European Cup	Geneva	10
2007-05-20	Premium European Cup	Sanremo	DNF

DNF = did not finish

== Personal life ==
In 2006 Delphine Py married Wilfrid Bilot. She lives in her native town Montpellier and works as a mathematics teacher at the Collège du Pic St. Loup in St. Clément de Rivière close to Montpellier.
