= Camille Donat =

French triathlete and swimmer

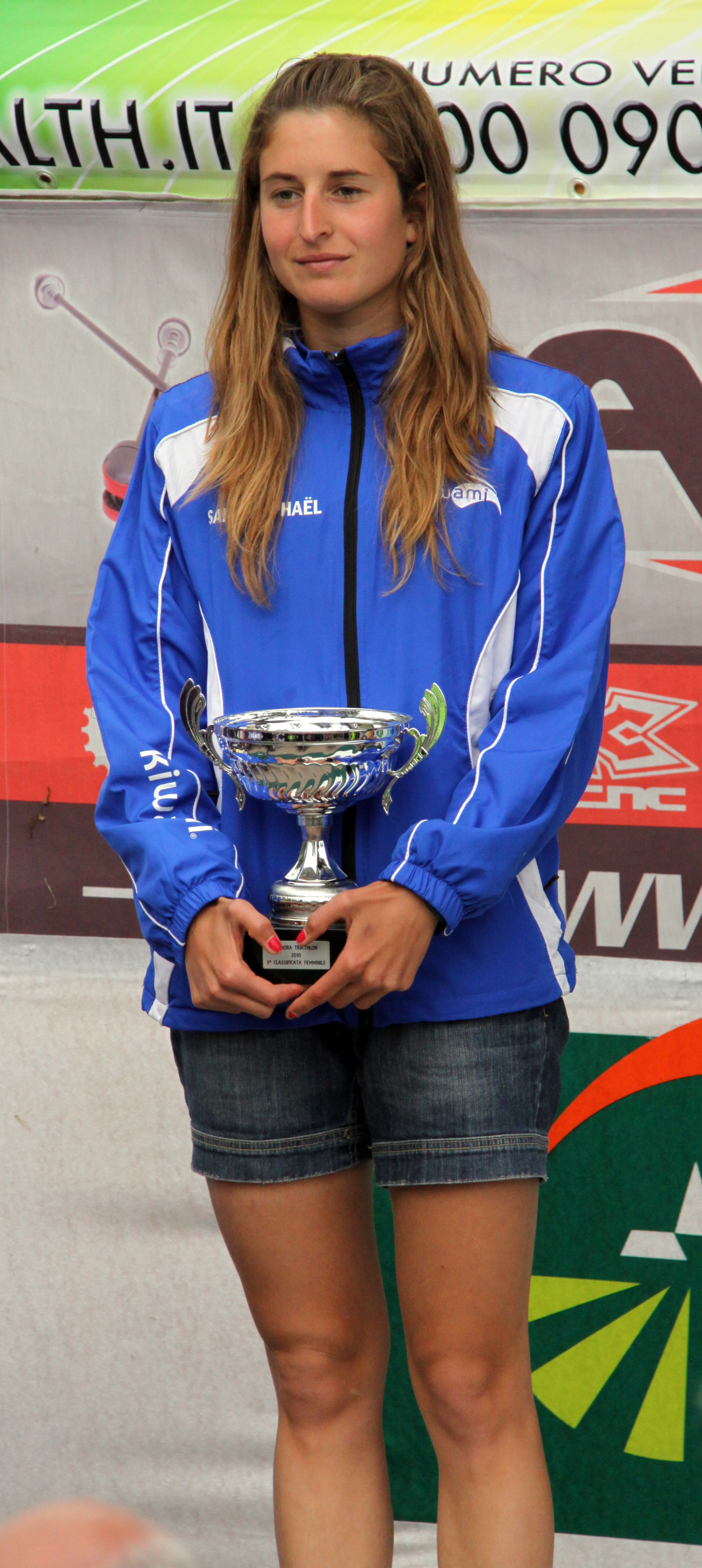
Camille Donat winning the bronze medal at the Triathlon di Andora, 2010.

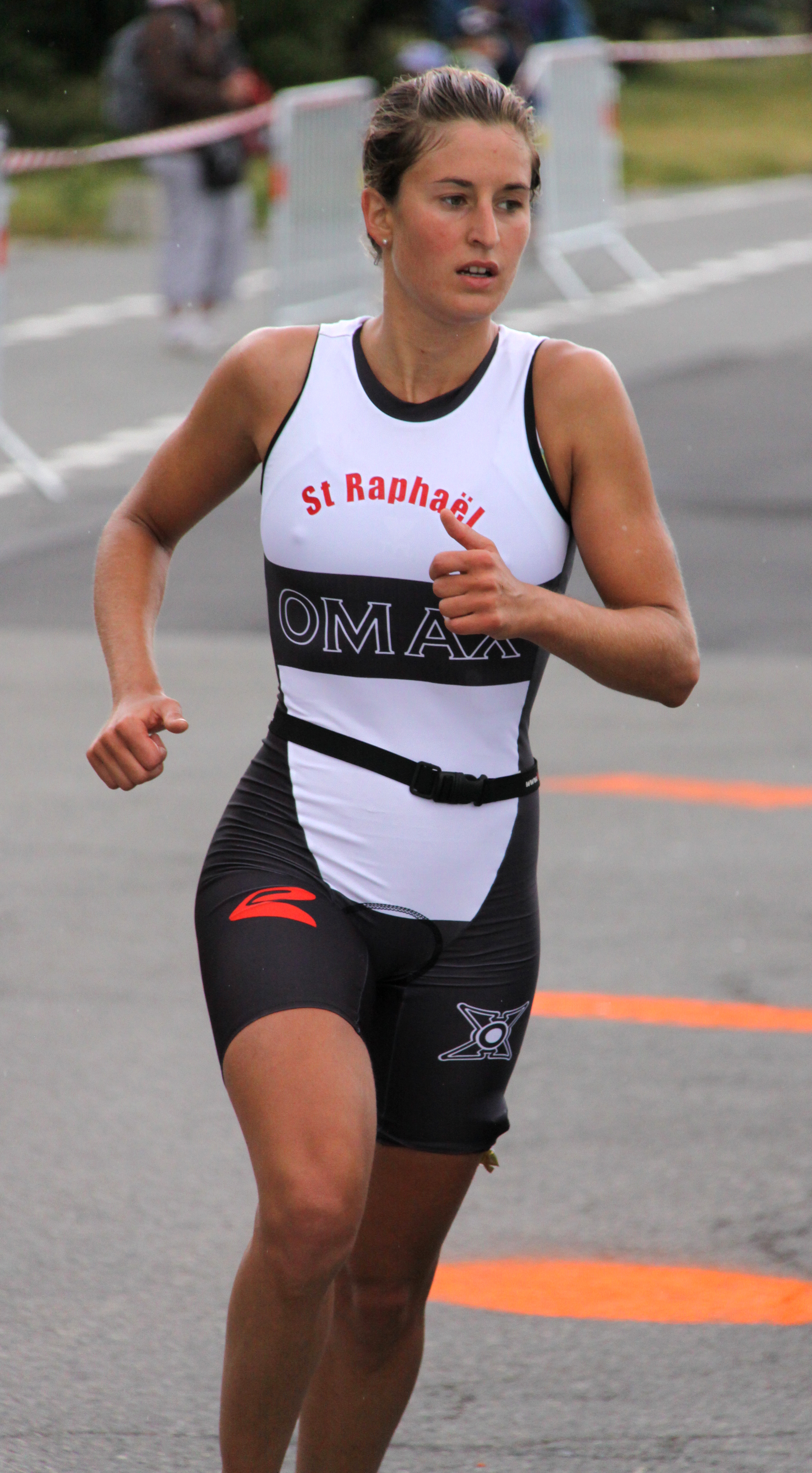
Camille Donat the second best French female athlete at Alpe d'Huez, 2010.

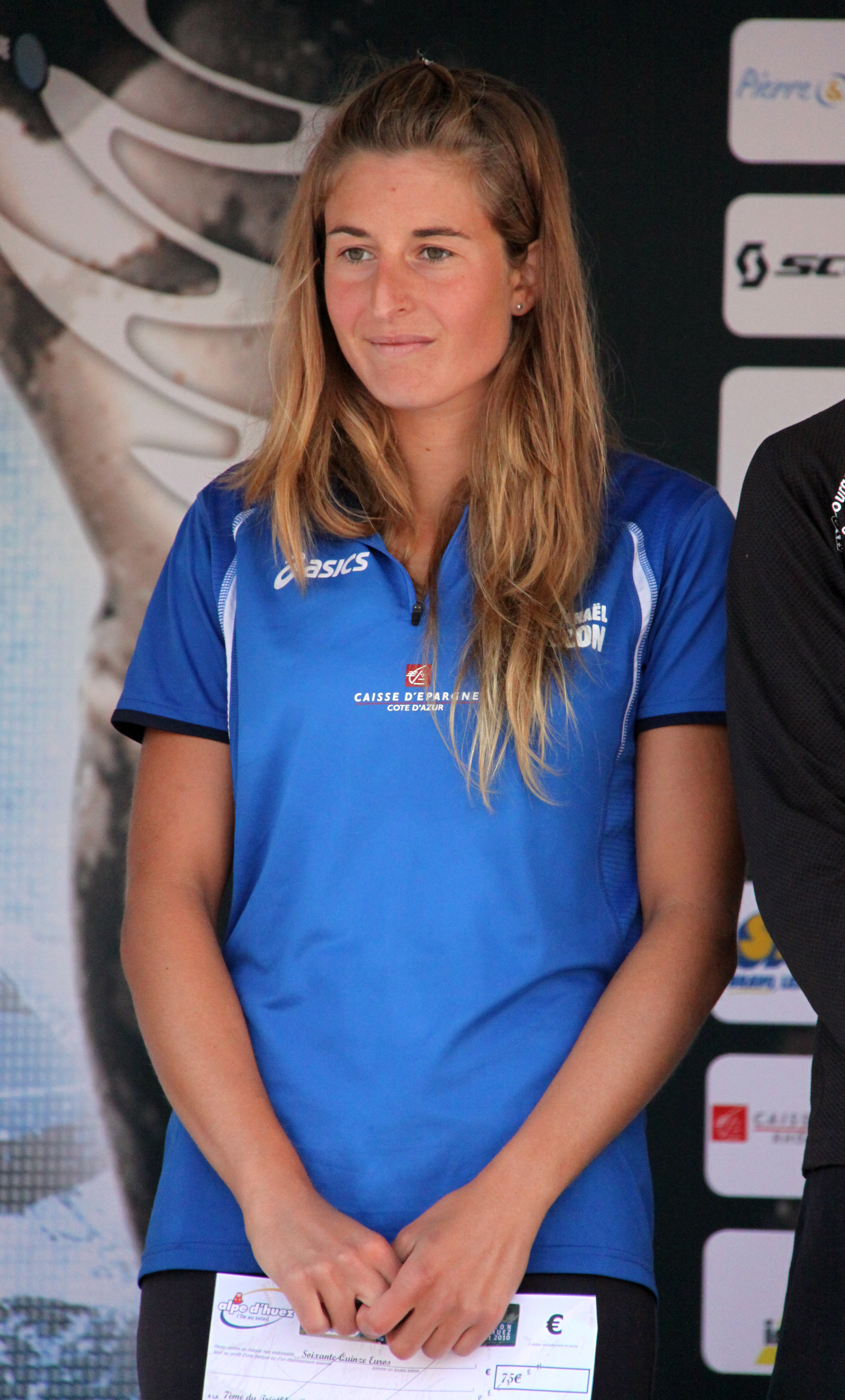
Camille Donat among the top ten female triathletes at Alpe d'Huez, 2010.

Camille Donat (born 1988) is a French professional triathlete and swimmer.

In France, Camille Donat represents Saint-Raphaël Triathlon and the swim club AMSL Frejus.

In 2009, she took part in the prestigious French Club Championship Series, representing TCG 79 Parthenay (Paris: 24th, La Baule: 37th), in 2010, however, she represented Saint-Raphaël Triathlon in the D2 Club Championship Series. In 2011 Donat will represent again Saint-Raphaël Triathlon in the French Club Championship Series.

From 2007 on, Camille Donat has regularly taken part in French Championships, placing 30th in 2007, 10th in 2008, 11th in 2009, and 4th in 2010 (= Long Distance). In 2009 Camille Donat won the silver medal at the famous Triathlon EDF Alpe d'Huez, in 2010 she placed 7th (i.e. 2nd best French female triathlete). In various minor competitions she could win medals as well, e.g. the bronze medal at Toulon (18 May 2008), silver at Paris (21 June 2008), and bronze at St. Raphael (26 April 2009).

== ITU Competitions ==
The following list is based upon the official ITU rankings and the Athlete's Profile Page. Unless indicated otherwise, the following events are triathlons (Olympic Distance) and belong to the Elite category.

Date	Competition	Place	Rank
2008-06-28	Premium European Cup	Holten	16
2010-06-27	Premium European Cup	Brasschaat	16
