= Julie Nivoix =

French triathlete

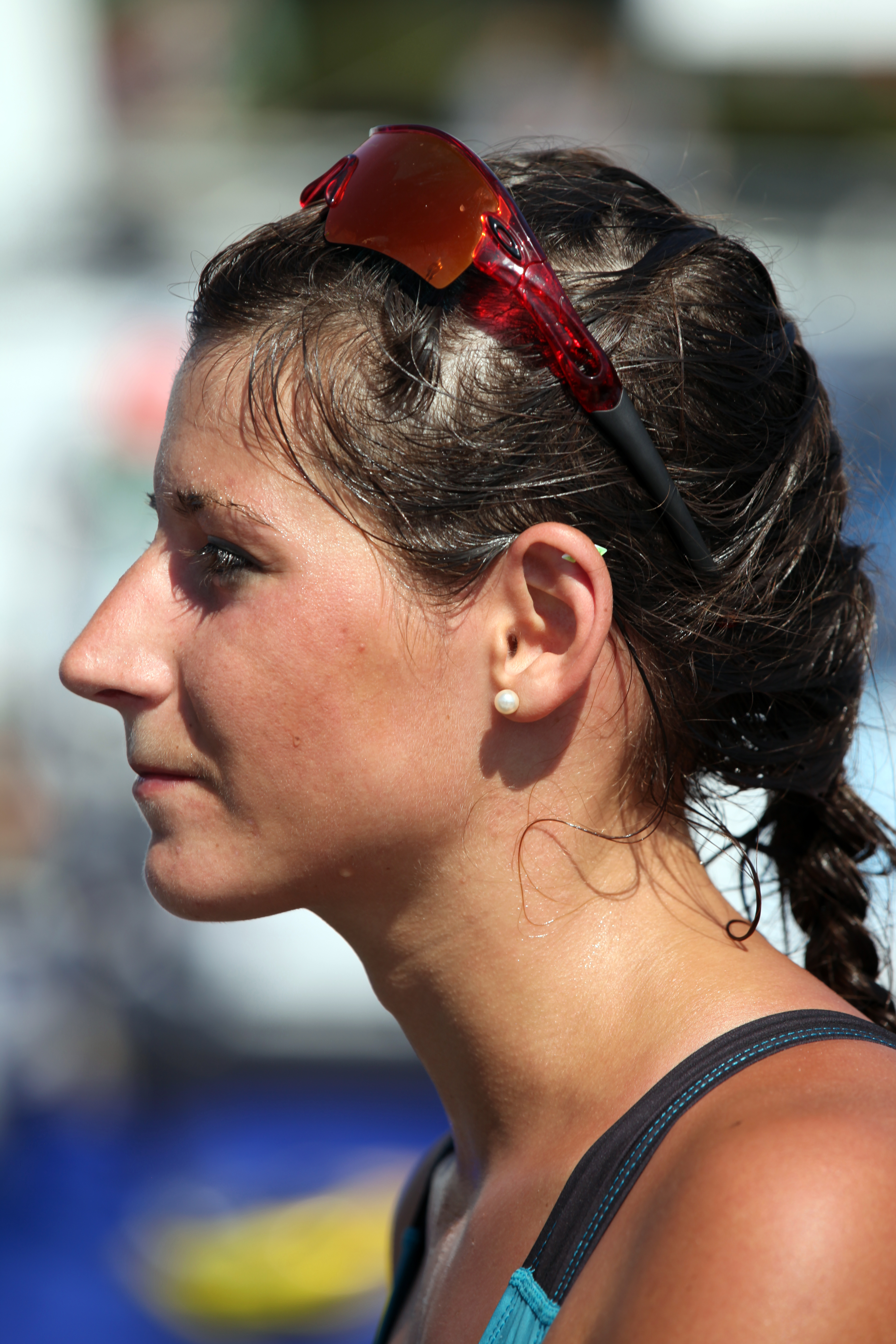
Julie Nivoix at the Grand Final of the French Grand Prix de Triathlon in Nice, 2012.

Julie Nivoix (born 1989 in Creutzwald, Lorraine), is a French professional triathlete and National French U23 bronze medalist of the year 2011.

In 2005, when she still represented Tri Forbach, Nivoix won the Aquathlon de Vittel in the Junior category (avenir). In 2006, 2007, 2008, and 2011 she won the gold medal in the Elite category, 2012 she placed 3rd.

Since 2009, Nivoix has taken part in the prestigious French Club Championship Series Grand Prix de Triathlon. At her first Grand Prix triathlon in Tours (19 July 2009), she placed 24th.

Nivoix studied sports at the University of Nancy and passed the EPS (Physical Education teacher) concours in 2012.

In 2012, Nivoix still represents TCC 36 (Triathlon Club Châteauroux 36). In Nice (16 September 2012), she placed 50th, in Paris (7 July 2012) 41st and in Dunkerque (20 May 2012) 52nd. TCC 36 placed 4th in the overall 2012 club ranking.

Nivoix also takes part in international non ITU events, e.g. the triathlon in Karukera, Guadeloupe. On 21 November 2010 and 20 November 2011, she won the gold medal.

== ITU Competitions ==
The following list is based upon the official rankings and the athlete's ITU Profile Page. Unless indicated otherwise, the following events are triathlons (Olympic Distance) and belong to the Elite category.

Date	Competition	Place	Rank
2008-05-10	European Championships (Junior)	Lisbon	18
2008-06-27	FISU World University Triathlon Championships	Erdek	16
2009-08-23	European Cup	Karlovy Vary (Carlsbad)	19
2011-10-15	Sprint African Cup	Larache	2

DNF = did not finish · DNS = did not start · DQ = disqualified
