= Monika Oražem =

Slovenian triathlete

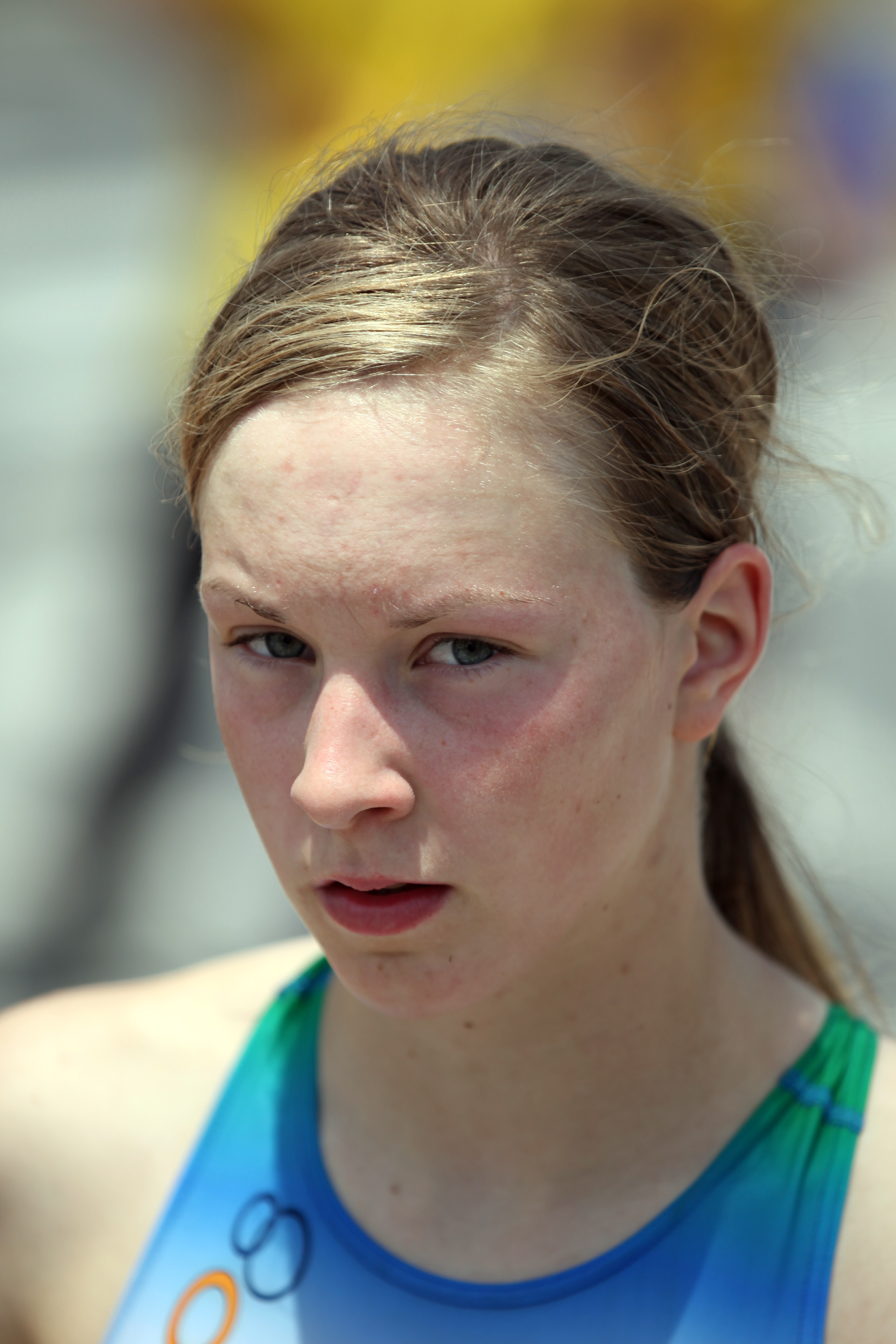
- Oražem at the 2011 European Championships (Junior)

Personal information
- Born: May 9, 1993 (age 31); Ljubljana, Slovenia

Sport
- Sport: Triathlon

Monika Oražem (born 9 May 1993 in Ljubljana) is a Slovenian professional triathlete, National Sprint Triathlon Champion of the year 2009, and National Sprint Duathlon Champion of the year 2010. According to the Olympic Simulation (August 2011),, she would be a reserve member of the Slovenian team at the Olympic Games in London 2012.

== Sports career ==
Monika Oražem started triathlon in 2004, at the age of 11, and from 2007 on she has regularly taken part in ITU competitions.

Monika Oražem takes part in the prestigious French Club Championship Series Lyonnaise des Eaux representing SAS (Saint Avertin Sports) Tri 37. At the opening triathlon of the 2011 circuit in Nice (24 April 2011), Oražem placed 10th, in Paris (9 July 2011) 24th, thus proving to be the best female triathlete of her club. For the experimental relay type Grand Prix triathlon in Tours (28 August 2011) she was consequently chosen as the decisive finalist and solo runner but this time she could not outdo her teammates.

In Slovenia, Oražem represents Triatlon klub Inles Riko Ribnica.

== ITU Competitions ==
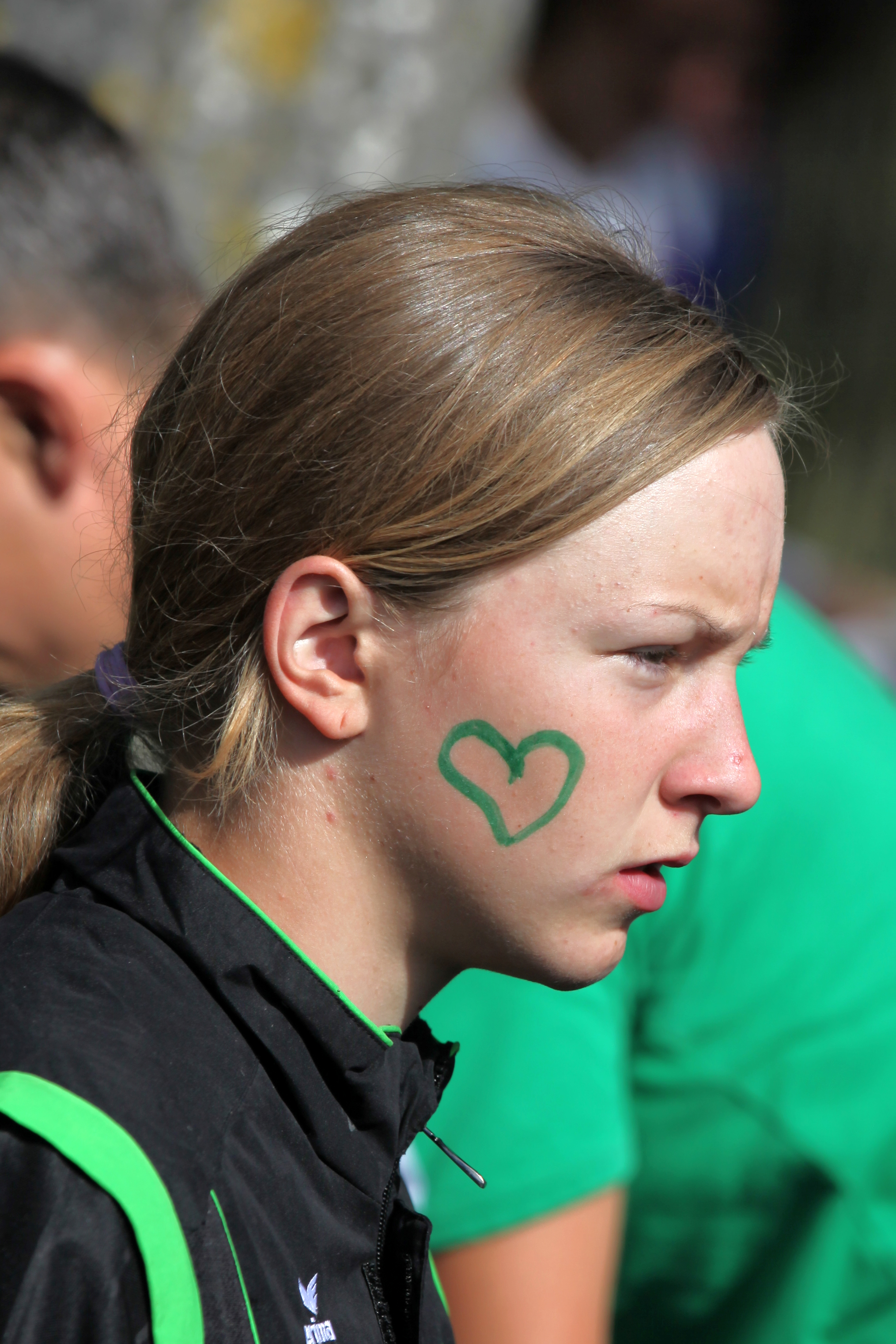
Oražem at the Grand Prix Triathlon in Tours, 2011.

In the four years from 2007 to 2010, Oražem took part in 20 ITU competitions and achieved 17 top ten positions. In 2011 Oražem took part in her first Elite competition, i.e. the Mixed Relay at the European Championships in Pontevedra.

The following list is based upon the official ITU rankings and the ITU Athletes's Profile Page. Unless indicated otherwise, the following events are triathlons (Olympic Distance) and refer to the Elite category.

Date	Competition	Place	Rank
2007-08-12	Junior European Cup	Tiszaújváros	8
2007-09-08	Junior European Cup	Bled	2
2008-06-28	Junior European Cup	Holten	1
2008-07-12	Junior European Cup	Tiszaújváros	3
2008-09-07	Team Relay European Championships (Youth)	Pulpí	4
2008-09-13	Junior European Cup	Bled	DNF
2008-09-27	Duathlon World Championships (Junior)	Rimini	9
2009-05-23	Duathlon European Championships (Junior)	Budapest	4
2009-06-06	Junior European Cup	Vienna	7
2009-07-02	European Championships (Junior)	Holten	15
2009-08-08	Junior European Cup	Tiszaújváros	5
2009-09-05	Junior European Cup	Bled	5
2009-09-26	European YOG (Youth Olympic Games) Qualifier	Mar Menor	8
2010-04-30	Duathlon European Championships	Nancy	9
2010-06-12	Junior European Cup	Vienna	3
2010-07-03	European Championships (Junior)	Athlone	4
2010-08-01	Junior European Cup	Tabor	3
2010-08-14	Youth Olympic Games	Singapore	10
2010-09-04	Junior European Cup	Bled	1
2010-09-08	Dextro Energy World Championship Series, Grand Final: Junior World Championships	Budapest	29
2011-04-17	Duathlon European Championships (Junior)	Limerick	5
2011-04-30	Junior European Cup	Tournai	1
2011-05-21	Junior European Cup	Brno	1
2011-06-11	Junior European Cup	Vienna	6
2011-06-24	European Championships (Junior)	Pontevedra	6
2011-07-31	Junior European Cup	Tabor	2
2011-08-13	Junior European Cup	Tiszaújváros	9
2011-08-13	Junior European Cup: Semifinal 1	Tiszaújváros	2
2011-08-20	Sprint World Championships	Lausanne	41
2011-08-21	Team World Championships	Lausanne	18

DNF = did not finish · DNS = did not start
