= Veronica Signorini =

Italian triathlete (born 1989)

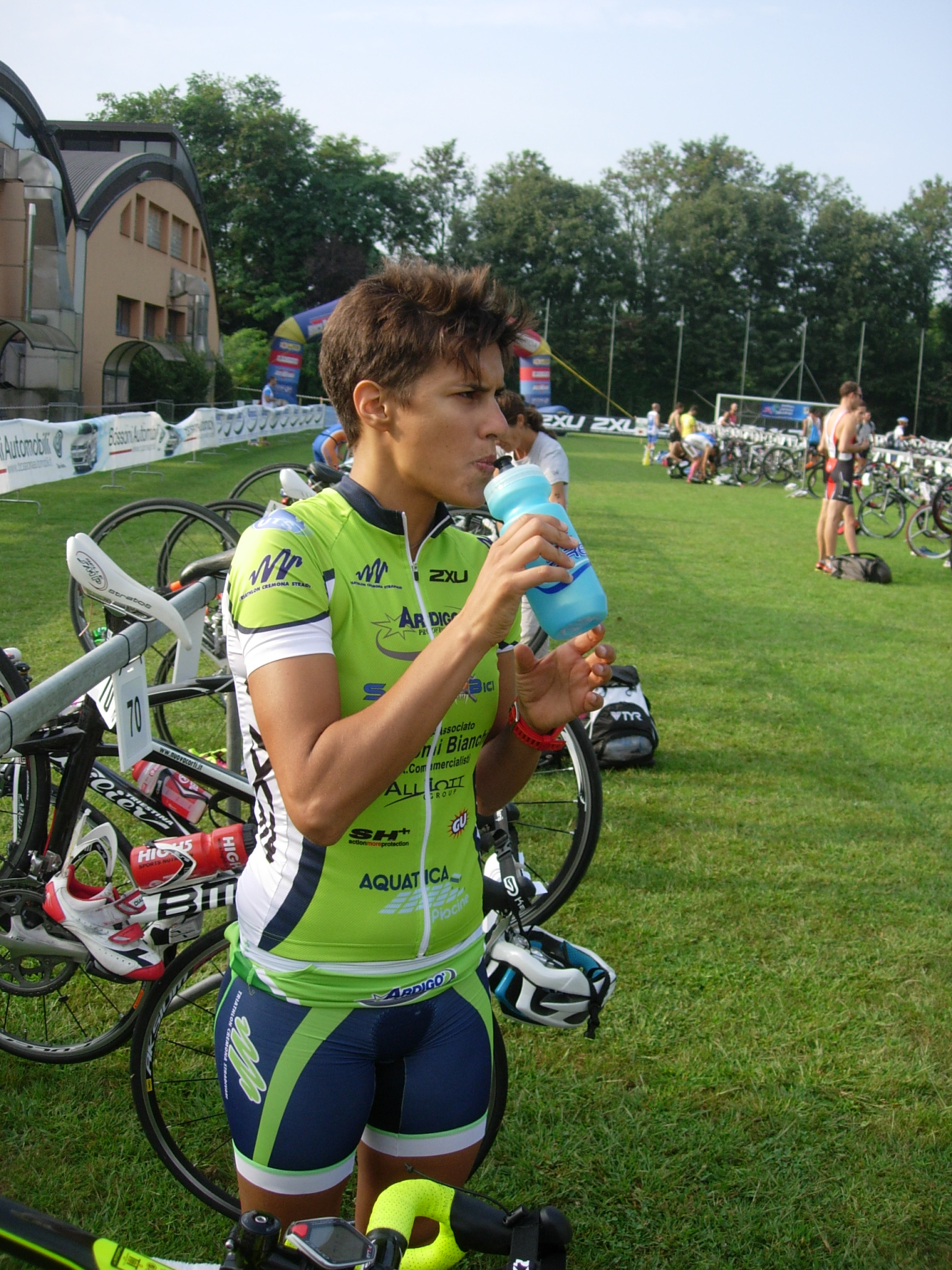

Personal information
- Nationality: Italian
- Born: July 28, 1989 (age 36); Cremona, Italy

Sport
- Country: Italy
- Sport: Triathlon
- Club: Triathlon Cremona Stradivari

Veronica Signorini (born 28 July 1989) is an Italian triathlete.

Veronica Signorini moved her first steps in the world of triathlon in the 2007, with a 10th place debut in Sprint Triathlon City of Cremona. The following year, she participated in some races of the Italian calendar; in the 2009 Veronica Signorini dedicated all her time to the multidiscipline and the first podium arrived. The same year she also joined the Italian federation in its project called "Scuola di Alta Specializzazione"; she continued her growth in the practice of the three disciplines. In the 2011 the international debut in the European Cup in Cremona in a Sprint distance race. In 2014, significant progress was made when Fabio Vedana joined as her coach, shifting her focus to ITU events, where she achieved strong results. Her best performance was a 4th place finish at the Africa Cup in Larache, Morocco.

== ITU Results ==
=== 2015 ===
- 10 Madrid ETU Cup (Spain)

=== 2014 ===
- 4 Larache ATU Cup (Morocco),
- 6 Tartu ETU Cup (Estonia);
- 10 Riga ETU Cup (Latvia),
- 19 Bratislava ETU WC (Slovakia);

=== 2013 ===
- 16 Cremona ETU (Italy);
- 18 Ginevra ETU (Switzerland),
- 24 Tiszaujvaros ITU WC (Hungary);

=== 2012 ===
- 16 Ginevra ETU Cup (Switzerland);
- 17 Mondello ETU Cup (Italy);
- 33 Cremona ETU Cup (Italy);

=== 2011 ===
- 21 Cremona ETU Cup (Italy);
