= Inna Tsyganok =

Ukrainian-Russian triathlete

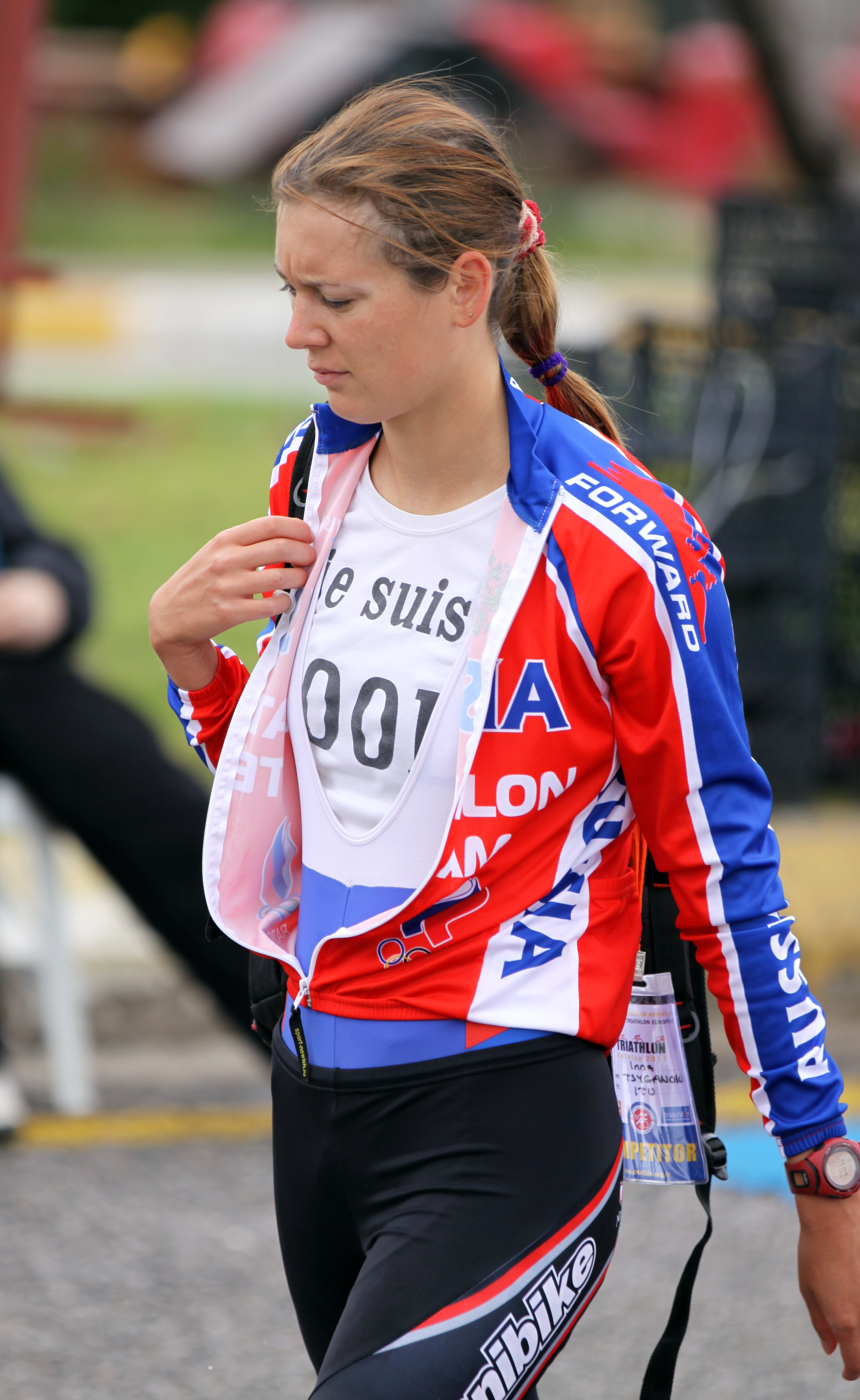
- Inna Tsyganok checking in for the European Cup triathlon in Antalya, 2011.

Personal information
- Nationality: Ukrainian/Russian
- Born: 24 January 1986 (age 39); Zhovti Vody

Sport
- Country: Russia
- Sport: Triathlon

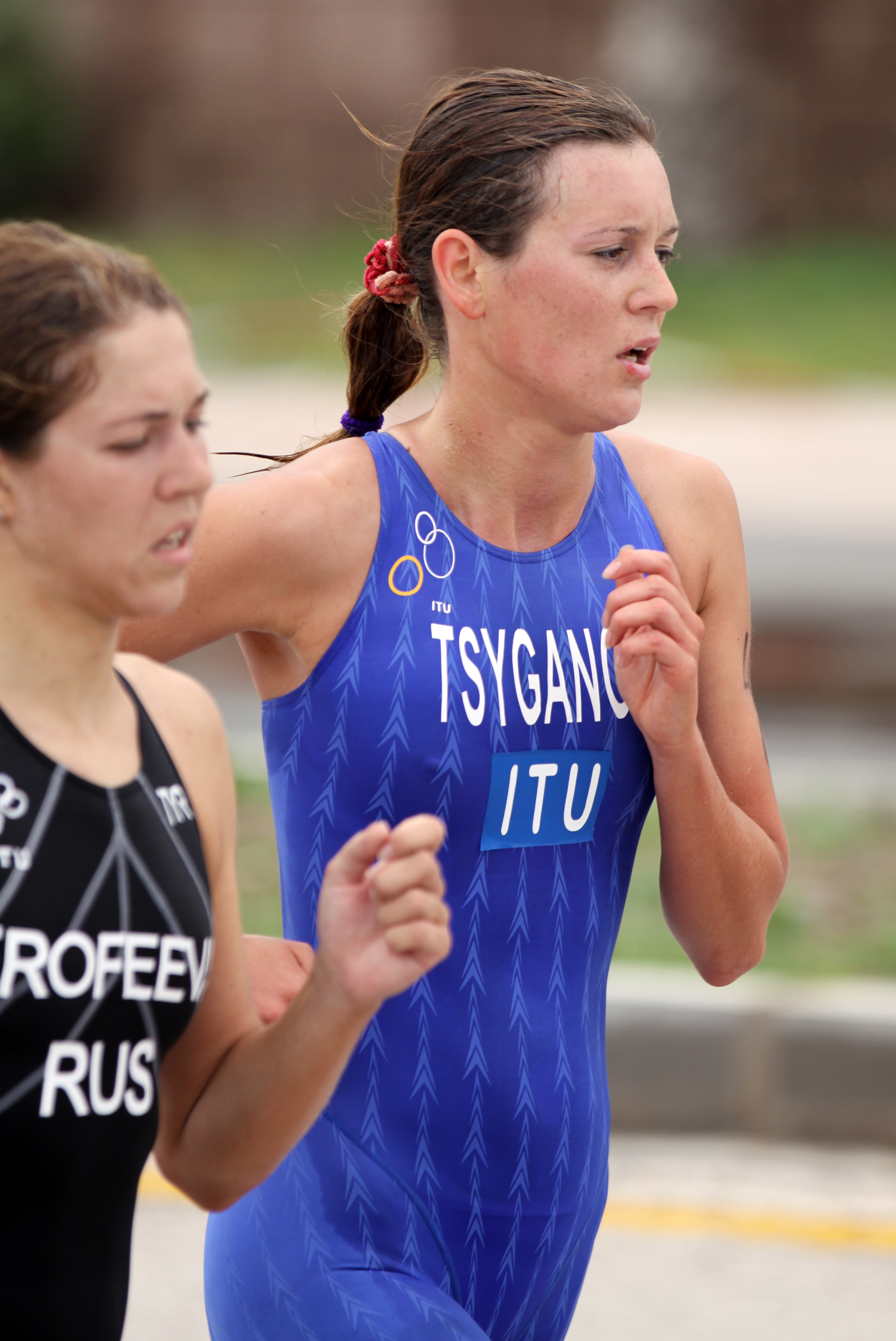
Inna Tsyganok at the European Cup triathlon in Antalya, 2011.

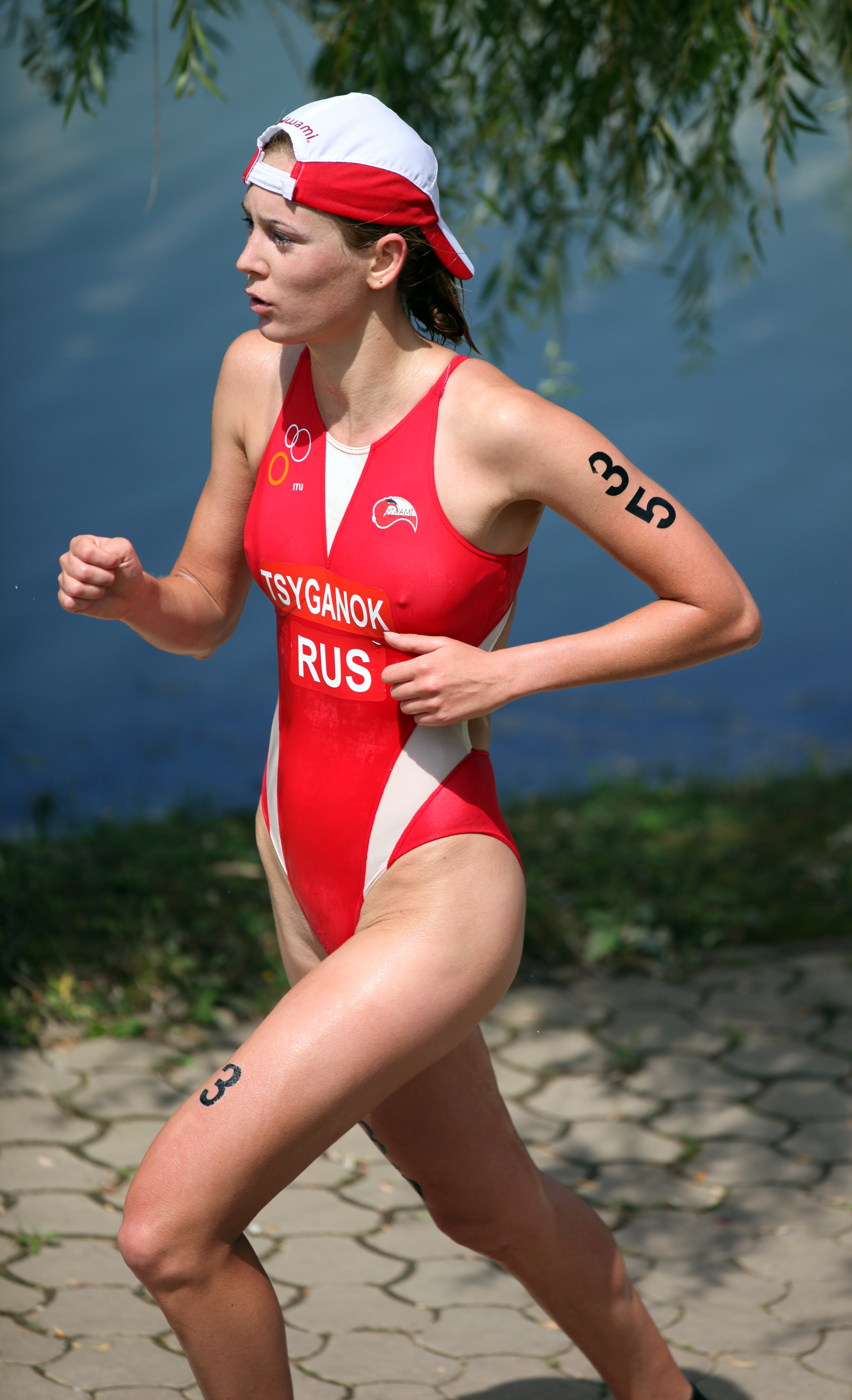
Inna Tsyganok representing Russia at Tiszaújváros, 2011.

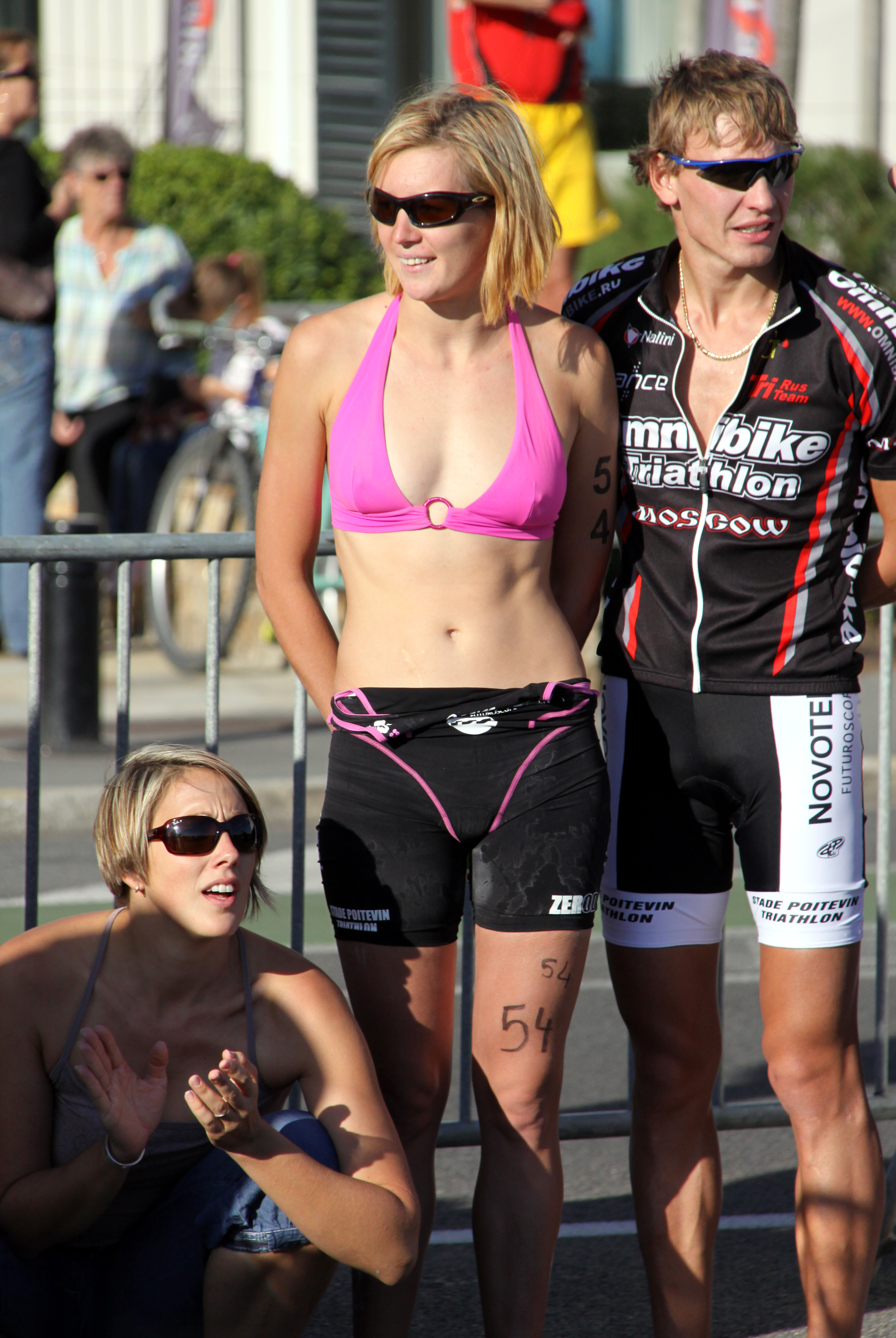
Inna Tsyganok at the Grand Final in La Baule with her fiancé Ivan Tutukin, 2009.

Inna Tsyganok (Ukrainian Інна Циганок (patronymic: Олегівна) and Russian Инна Цыганок; born 24 January 1986 in Zhovti Vody,) is a professional Ukrainian Russian triathlete, member of the Ukrainian National Team and National Champion of the year 2009. In 2011, Tsyganok took part in ITU competitions "representing ITU", i.e. without a citizenship, which seems to be a violation of the ITU regulations but as of August 2011 she is officially representing Russia.

== French Club Championship Series ==
Taking part at the prestigious French Club Championship Series Lyonnaise des Eaux Tsyganok proved to be the main stay of the club Stade Poitevin Triathlon.

In 2009, at Dunkirk, the first triathlon of the Lyonnaise des Eaux circuit, Tsyganok placed 17th (6th in the U23 category) and could push Stade Poitevin to the 9th position in the team ranking. The second international guest star, Felicity Sheedy Ryan, placed 22nd and the three French members of the team, Melissa Grignard, Charlotte Lancereau and Anne Claire Menant, placed 38th, 52nd, and 63rd respectively.

In 2010, Tsyganok took part in three of the five triathlons of the Club Championship: at Beauvais (13 June 2010) she placed 9th, at Tourangeaux (29 August 2010) 19th, and at the Grand Final in La Baule (Triathlon Audencia, 18 September 2010) 26th, thus she was always the best or second best of her club. At Dunkirk and at Paris, Stade Poitevin had to replace Tsyganok with Natalia Shliakhtenko.

In 2011, Tsyganok took part at the opening triathlon of the season in Nice (24 April 2011), placing 20th and turning out the best of the club's triathletes. At Dunkirk (22 May 2011), Tsyganok placed 16th and was the club's second best triathlete behind Sheedy Ryan.

== ITU Competitions ==
In the nine years from 2002 to 2010 Tsyganok took part in 43 ITU competitions and achieved 12 top ten positions. In April 2011 Tsyganok opened her new season with another top ten position at the European Cup in Antalya.

In 2011, the ITU rankings do not state Tsyganok's nationality any more but give her country as «ITU». The Ukrainian Triathlon Federation still enumerates Tsyganok among the elite members of the National Team, but Tsyganok also took part at the Russian National Championships in Penza (27 May 2011) placing 3rd. Since 2011, the ITU lists Russia as her country.

The following list is based upon the official ITU rankings and the Athlete's Profile Page.

Unless indicated otherwise, the following events are triathlons (Olympic Distance) and refer to the Elite category.

Date	Competition	Place	Rank
2002-07-06	European Championships (Junior)	Györ	21
2003-06-21	European Championships (Junior)	Carlsbad	26
2004-07-03	European Championships (Junior)	Lausanne	20
2004-10-27	European Cup (Elite)	Alanya	7
2005-07-23	European Championships (Junior)	Alexandroupolis	12
2005-10-26	Premium European Cup	Alanya	26
2006-06-23	European Championships	Autun	DNF
2006-07-08	European Championships (U23)	Rijeka	29
2006-08-13	BG World Cup	Tiszaújváros	DNF
2006-09-17	Premium European Cup	Kedzierzyn Kozle	16
2006-10-18	Premium European Cup	Alanya	10
2007-04-15	BG World Cup	Ishigaki	57
2007-05-20	European Cup	Limassol	DNS
2007-07-21	European Championships (U23)	Kuopio	11
2007-08-05	European Cup	Egirdir	7
2007-08-30	BG World Championships (U23)	Hamburg	12
2007-09-09	Premium European Cup	Kedzierzyn Kozle	17
2007-10-24	Premium European Cup	Alanya	DNF
2008-04-13	European Cup	Chania	8
2008-06-05	BG World Championships (U23)	Vancouver	16
2008-07-27	Premium European Cup	Poznan	11
2008-08-03	European Cup	Egirdir	8
2008-09-06	European Championships (U23)	Pulpí	25
2008-10-16	Premium European Cup	Alanya	18
2009-05-17	Premium European Cup	Pontevedra	8
2009-06-20	European Championships (U23)	Tarzo Revine	14
2009-06-27	Elite Cup	Hy-Vee	35
2009-07-05	Premium Asia Cup	Burabay	1
2009-07-12	Asia Cup	Kokshetau	1
2009-08-09	World Cup	Tiszaújváros	16
2009-08-23	European Cup	Carlsbad	DNF
2009-08-30	Premium European Cup	Kedzierzyn Kozle	8
2009-09-09	Dextro Energy World Championship Series, Grand Final (U23)	Gold Coast	14
2009-10-25	Premium European Cup	Alanya	11
2010-04-11	Triathlon Premium Asian Cup	Singapore	DNF
2010-04-18	European Cup	Antalya	5
2010-05-22	European Cup	Senec	15
2010-06-05	Dextro Energy World Championship Series	Madrid	55
2010-07-17	Dextro Energy World Championship Series	Hamburg	44
2010-08-08	World Cup	Tiszaújváros	33
2010-09-12	Dextro Energy World Championship Series, Grand Final	Budapest	55
2010-10-24	Premium European Cup	Alanya	5
2010-11-13	Premium European Cup	Eilat	5
2011-04-03	European Cup	Antalya	6
2011-06-04	Dextro Energy World Championship Series	Madrid	DNF
2011-06-26	Premium Asian Cup	Burabay	2
2011-07-03	European Cup	Penza	7
2011-07-16	Dextro Energy World Championship Series	Hamburg	50
2011-08-14	World Cup	Tiszaújváros	24
2011-08-21	European Cup	Karlovy Vary (Carlsbad)	

BG = the sponsor British Gas · DNF = did not finish · DNS = did not start
