= Evelina De Lain =

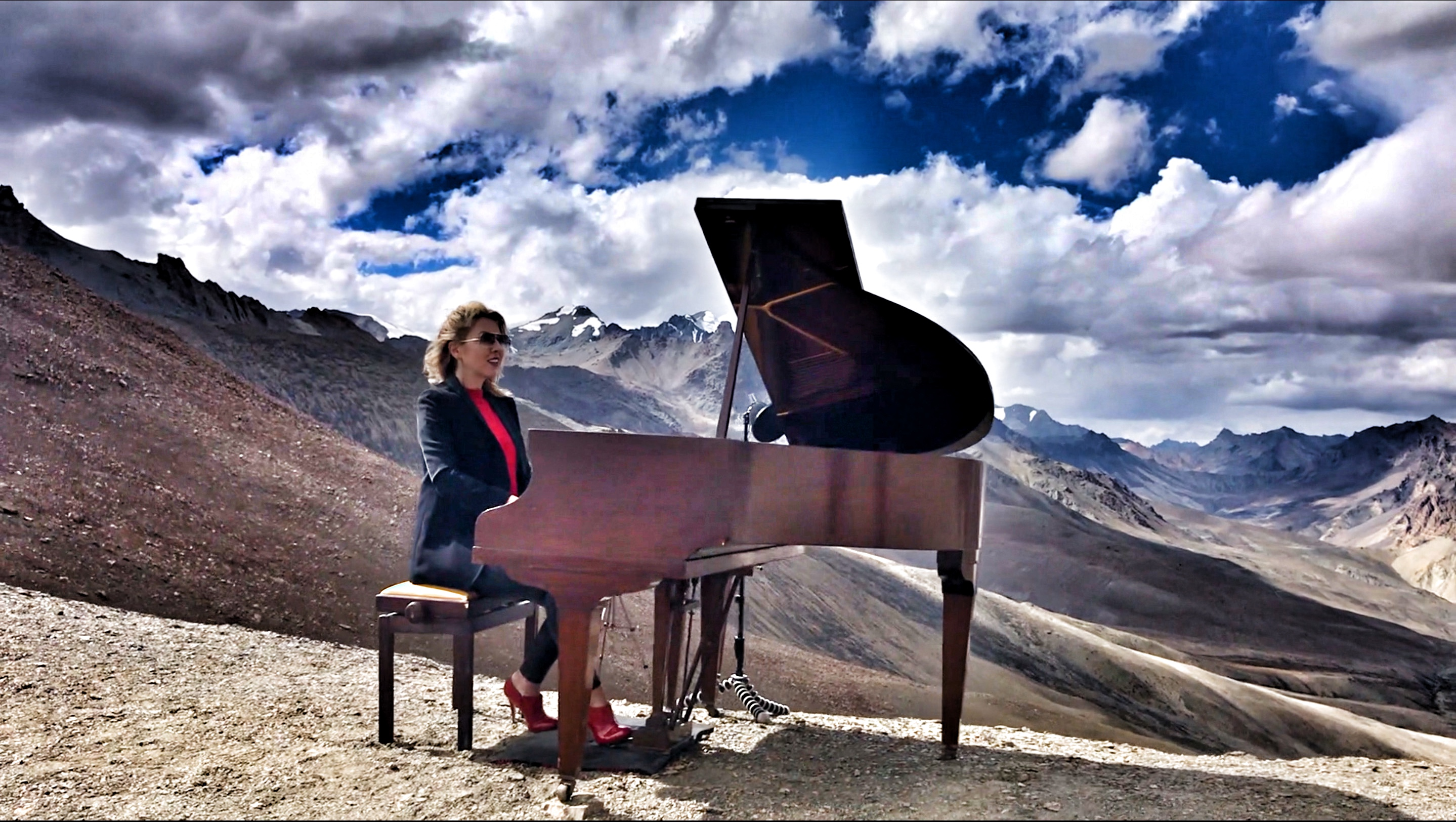
- On 6 September 2018 she performed the Highest Grand Piano Concert for Charity in Himalayas

Background information
- Birth name: Evelina Renatovna Pronskaya
- Born: 2 February 1977 (age 48); Zhovti Vody near Dnipropetrovsk, Ukraine
- Origin: London, UK
- Genres: Contemporary classical, jazz
- Occupation(s): Pianist, Composer, Producer, Educator, Author, Inspirational Speaker, Performance Coach
- Instrument(s): Piano, vocals
- Years active: 1995–present
- Website: www.evelinadelain.com

Evelina De Lain (born Evelina Renatovna Pronskaya on 2 February 1977 in Zhovti Vody near Dnipropetrovsk, Ukraine) is a London-based classical and jazz pianist, composer, author, performance coach, educator and producer known for her crossover composition style.

De Lain began studying music at the age of five, and by the age of 14, she was teaching music to younger students. She gained her diploma with distinction at M. Glinka Conservatoire of Dnipropetrovsk, specializing in solo piano, chamber music, and accompaniment.

On September 6, 2018, De Lain performed a charity concert at Singge La pass, Himalayas at nearly 5000 meters which was awarded the Highest Altitude Grand Piano Performance in the World.

She performed Chopin's Nocturnes No. 2 in E flat major and No. 20 in C sharp minor, his ‘Raindrop’ Prélude Op. 28 No. 15 as well as compositions from her solo album Soul Journey - "Norwegian Fjords" , "Pavana" and "Dark Angel".

De Lain said: “It was such an honor to be asked to play my music in the clouds, [but] it was one for the hardest things I have ever done.”

This effort was extensively featured in the world media, including BBC World Service, ITV News, The Independent, The Metro, The Daily Mirror, ITV news "Point of View", ABC Classic FM, BR Classic, Radio Canada, CNN Turk, The Limelight Magazine, The Newsweek, The Guinness World Records, Classic Fm, London Live, The Montagna TV etc.

In Russian - Afisha London, KudaGo, OpenTV, 34ua.

Ukrainian news - Dnipro UA

In August 2019, De Lain has completed three more "Extreme Concerts" in Guatemala. 19 August in the mountains of Lake Atitlan at sunrise 24 August - first ever Grand Piano Performance on the Active Volcano Pacaya. 25 August - first ever Grand Piano Concert on the Active Volcano.

She moved to London in 2004, where she formed her classical/jazz trio with piano, viola, and clarinet and later with piano, flute, and cello. She continued to perform extensively with trios and string quartets as well as solo.

De Lain has established her "International School of Music" in 2014 and expanded its operation in December 2018.

She has also created music-based therapeutical approach "Inside the Music".

She accompanied Broadway stars such as Jeanne Lehman (the original Mrs. Potz from Beauty and the Beast) and Kissy Simmons (the original Nala from The Lion King).

She tours Europe with classical/jazz/contemporary crossover recitals and regularly performs in London, England at her own piano salon in Tower Bridge.

== Discography ==
- 12 Colourful Preludes (2011)
- Soul Journey (2015)
- "Narcissus Triangle" - Ballet (2016)
