= Zhovti Vody =

City in Dnipropetrovsk Oblast, Ukraine

Zhovti Vody Жовті Води
- City
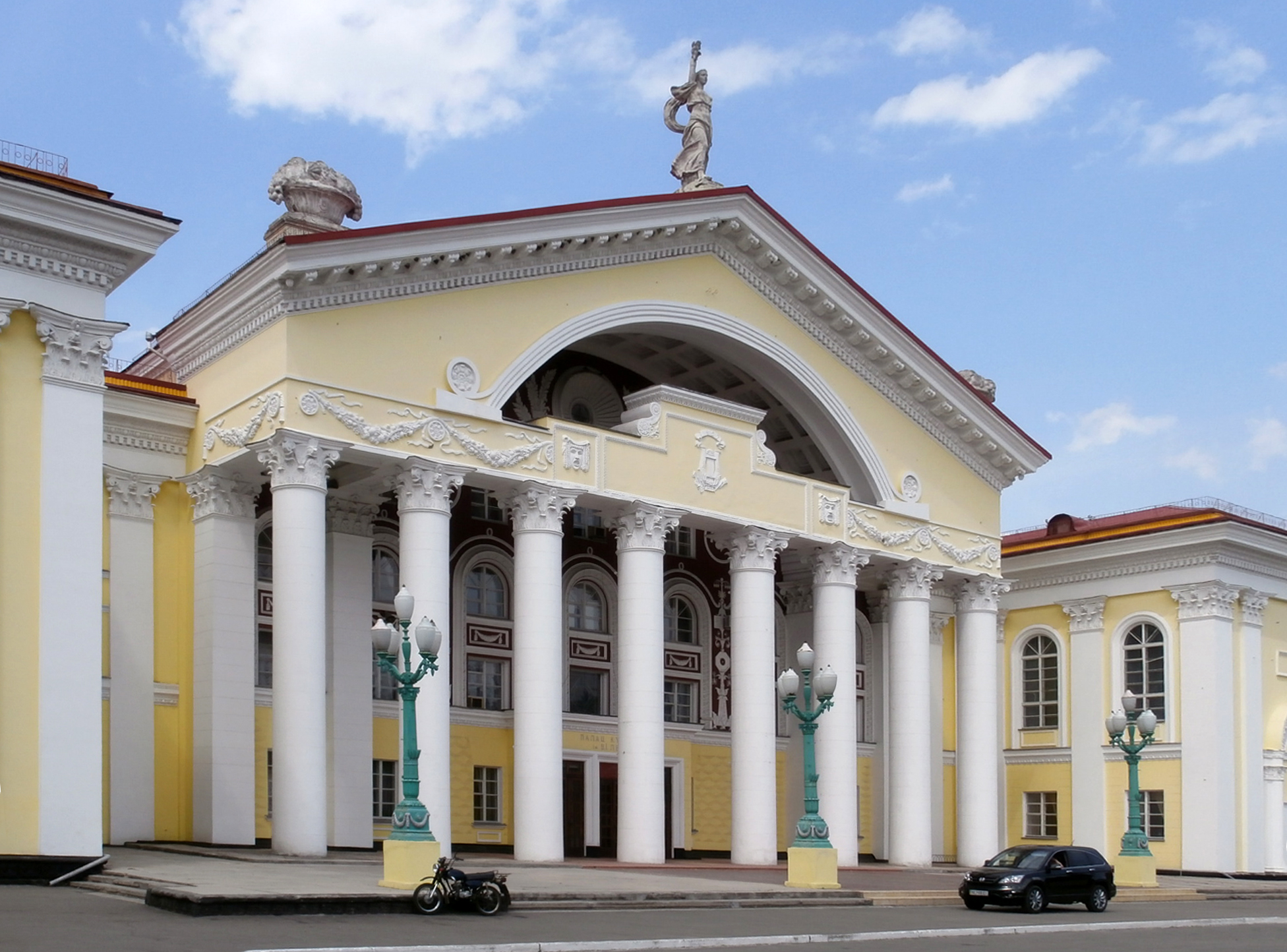
- Palace of Culture

- Flag Coat of arms
- Interactive map of Zhovti Vody
- Location of Zhovti Vody Zhovti Vody (Dnipropetrovsk Oblast)
- Coordinates: 48°21′0″N 33°30′0″E
- Country: Ukraine
- Oblast: Dnipropetrovsk Oblast
- Raion: Kamianske Raion
- Metropolitan area: Kryvyi Rih metropolitan area
- Hromada: Zhovti Vody urban hromada
- Founded: 1895
- City: 1957

Area
  - Total: 33.25 km^{2} (12.84 sq mi)

Population (2022)
  - Total: 42,052
  - Density: 1,588/km^{2} (4,110/sq mi)
- Postal code: 52290-
- Area code: +380-5652
- Website: zhv.gov.ua

Zhovti Vody (Ukrainian: Жовті Води, IPA: [ˈʒɔu̯t⁽ʲ⁾i ˈwɔdɪ], lit. 'Yellow Waters') is a city in Kamianske Raion, Dnipropetrovsk Oblast, central Ukraine. It is located on the Zhovta River approximately 70 km (43 mi) north of the metropolitan area's center, Kryvyi Rih. It hosts the administration of Zhovti Vody urban hromada, one of the hromadas of Ukraine. Population: 42,052 (2022 estimate).

Since 1951 and hence forward during the soviet era, the city became a "secret city" (possibly a closed city) codenamed "Mailbox 28", and did not feature on maps, because of the establishment in the city in 1951 of a uranium mine and mill for the extraction and processing of uranium ore - although mining of uranium locally in the city has since officially ceased.

Present day activities of the Eastern Mining and Processing Enterprise (VostGOK) headquartered in the city are reportedly concerned with extraction of iron ore and production of hydrochloric acid as well as the continued milling of uranium ore mined from more distant regions further to the east, and as such VostGOK is the largest European and the only Ukrainian extractor of uranium ore and only Ukrainian producer of uranium concentrate.

Considerable parts of the city and its surrounding farmland are severely and dangerously polluted with uranium ore (and consequently radon gas in buildings built on uranium ore found naturally in the granite of the city, or due to the use of uranium containing granite in building foundations), with radioactivity levels in some instances in the city comparable to heavily contaminated areas surrounding Chernobyl, with residents suffering increased incidence of congenital conditions and cancers, many of which have been conclusively linked to radiation exposure. There appears to be evidence of disposal of uranium contaminated machinery at the edge of farmland surrounding the city, which contaminates nearby crops, and when excavated by scrap metal foragers, contaminate the individuals who handle the uranium contaminated scrap-metal, as well as those who come into contact with the individuals contaminated (family members, neighbours, etc).

== History ==
The historic Battle of Zhovti Vody was fought on the site of the present-day city.

The area has been referred to by the term Zhovti Vody (literally 'yellow waters') and contain Cossack settlements "zymivnyks" (wintering places) information about which is scarce.

The story of the modern settlement starts with times when in the Russian Empire geological studies and mining surveying of the area were carried out in 1895. It was a Russian colonial exploitation of land that previously belonged to Zaporizhian Cossacks. Businessman Lvov and engineer Borutskiy rented some area lot of 870 dessiatin (1 dessiatin = 2.7 acres) from local village of Veselo-Ivanivka. That quarry became a property of mining society "Zhovta Rika". In 1898 in the area was established another quarry of Krasnokut owned by Yekaterinoslav merchant Kopylov. Around those quarries appeared a workers' settlement which was unofficially referred to as "Zhovta Rika". By that time excavation of iron ore at Veselo-Ivanivka quarry reached 3.5 million poods per year (1 pood = 36.11 pounds), while at Krasnokut and Kolomoitsev quarries it reached 2.5 million poods per year.

Also, simultaneously around that time in area of south and southeastern Ukraine (Yekaterinoslav Governorate) was developing the Yekaterinine Railway which stretched from the Southern Bug to Siversky Donets (across Dnieper) and connected most of mining settlements in the area including those which today associated with Donbas. In 1898 there was built Zhovti Vody train station as part of the Yekaterinine Railway and a separate rail branch stretching for some 10 verstas (1 versta = 3,500 feet) to the mining settlement of the Zhovta Rika mining society. Until that time ore from those quarries was delivered by animal pulled transport further to Kryvyi Rih. In 1905 in the workers' settlement was established an elementary school. During the so called Russian Civil War (1918-1920), the settlement was abandoned since quarries were not operational.

In 1924, work of quarries was renewed and all quarries were united into one mining administration "Zhovta Rika". During the period of industrialization in the Soviet Union, in the settlement were built several shops mechanical, steam locomotive, cooling tower, high voltage transmission lines, compressor station, two electrical substations. In 1934 there was opened a new mine shaft "Kapitalnaya" which was the biggest in Kryvbas (Kryvyi Rih mining basin) area. In 1940 excavation of ore increased to 724,000 metric ton per year. Before the World War II, the settlement had several multi-story buildings, two hospitals, two schools, a club, a library. Zhovta Rika was under Nazi Germany occupation just over two years in 1941–1943.

After the war in 1950, while surveying areas of magnetite deposits, there were also found some uranium ore deposits. In 1951 there was established the Eastern Mining and Processing Plant specializing in uranium mining.

In 1957, the worker settlement Zhovta Rika was officially renamed as the city of Zhovti Vody. In 1959 in the city was formed a football team of masters Avanhard which competed at lower tier Soviet football competitions.

Until 18 July 2020, Zhovti Vody was incorporated as a city of oblast significance and the center of Zhovti Vody Municipality. The municipality was abolished in July 2020 as part of the administrative reform of Ukraine, which reduced the number of raions of oblast. The area of Zhovti Vody Municipality was merged into the newly established Kamianske Raion.

== Demographics ==
=== Historical population data ===
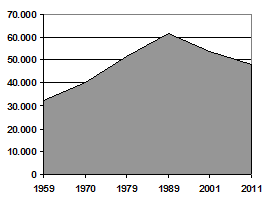
populations 1959-2011

=== Ethnic groups ===
Distribution of the population by ethnicity according to the 2001 census:

Ethnic groups in Zhovti Vody
	percent
Ukrainians	80.14%
Russians	16.66%
Belarusians	0.58%
Armenians	0.23%
Moldovans	0.11%
Tatars	0.11%
Azerbaijanis	0.09%
Germans	0.06%
Jews	0.06%

== Sport ==
There's a bandy team.

== Notable people ==
- Inna Tsyganok, a professional Ukrainian triathlete
- Anastasiya Polyanskaya, a professional Russian biathlete
- Evelina De Lain, a pianist and composer

== Gallery ==
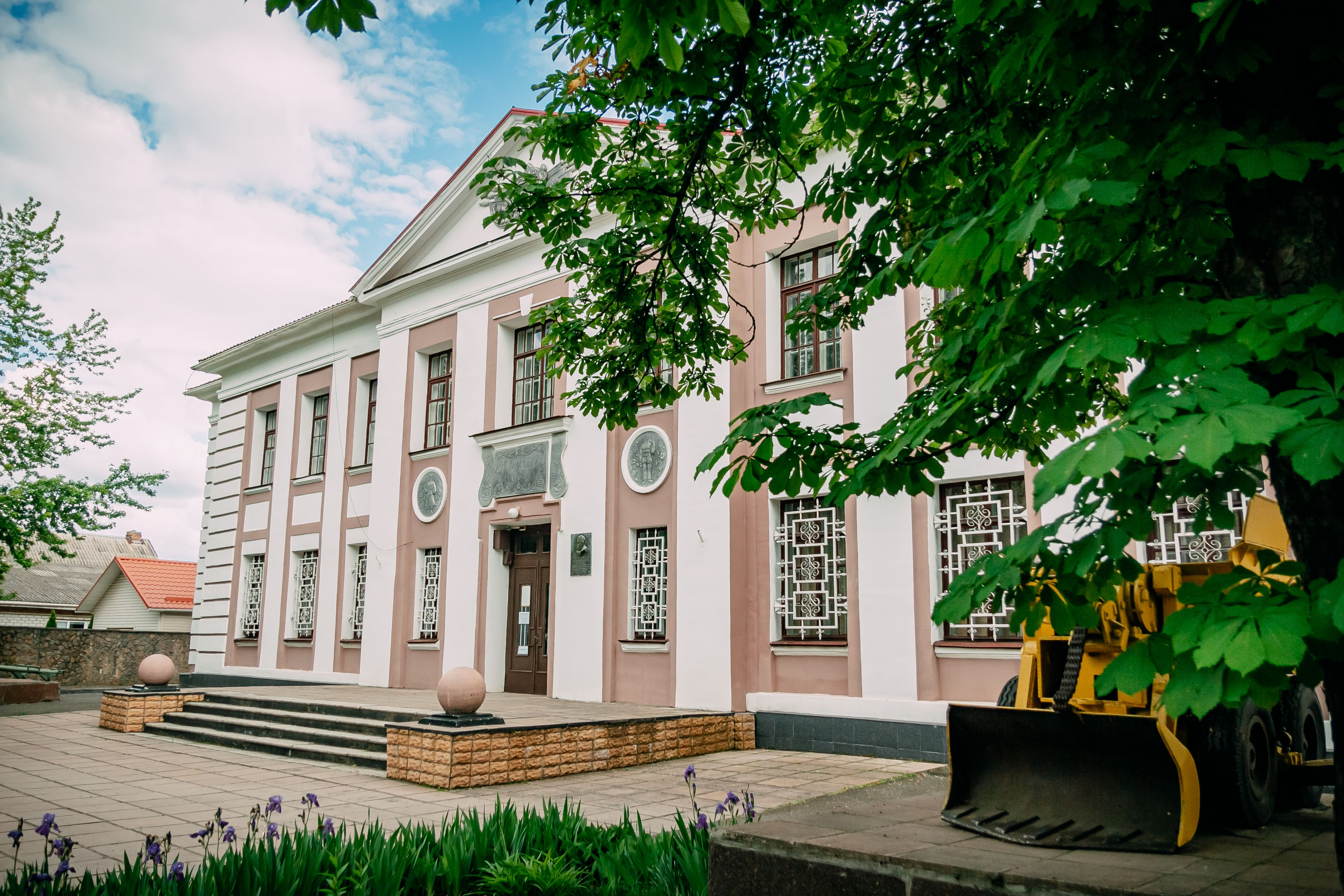
Zhovti Vody Museum of History

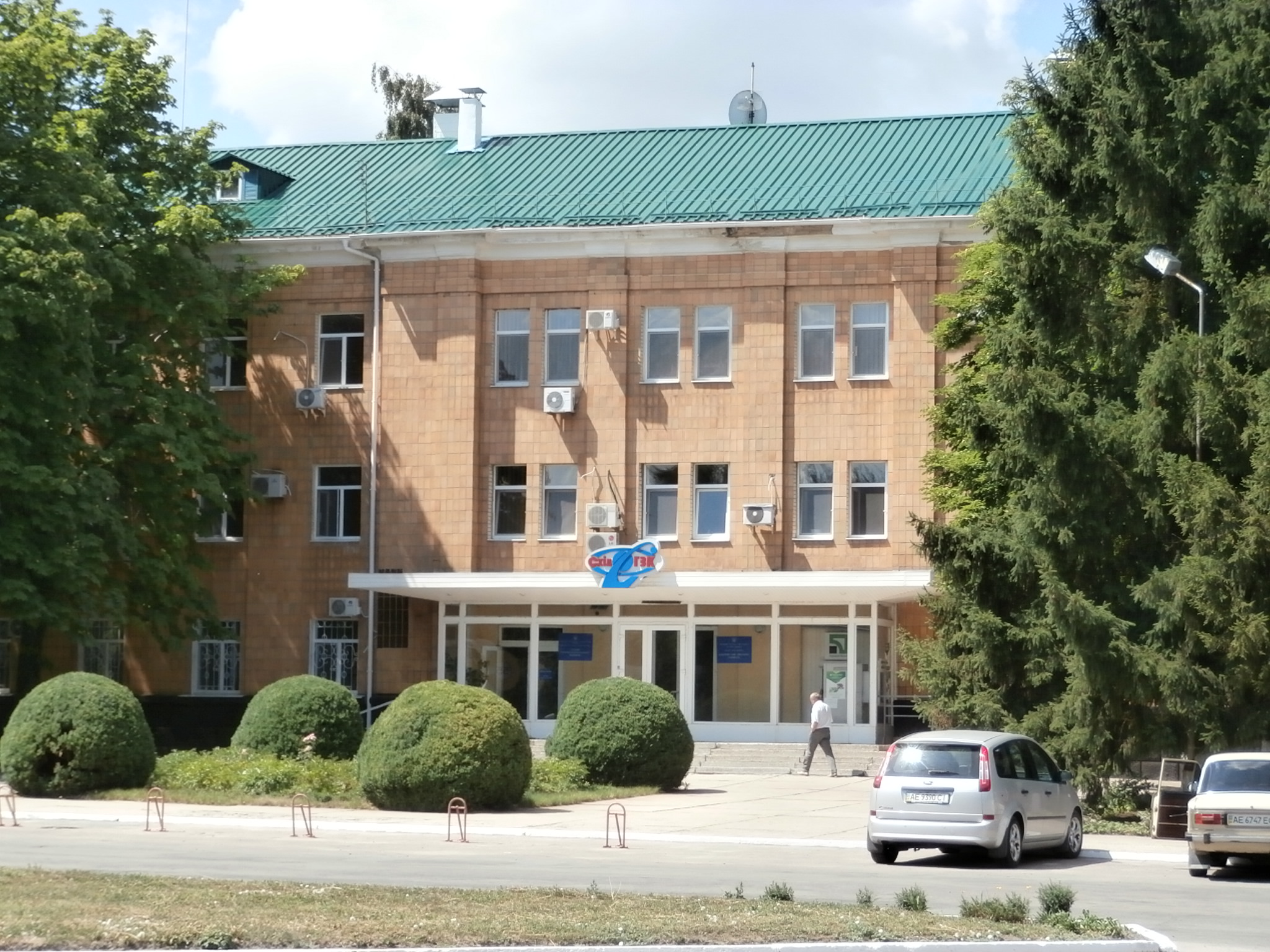
Mining plant building

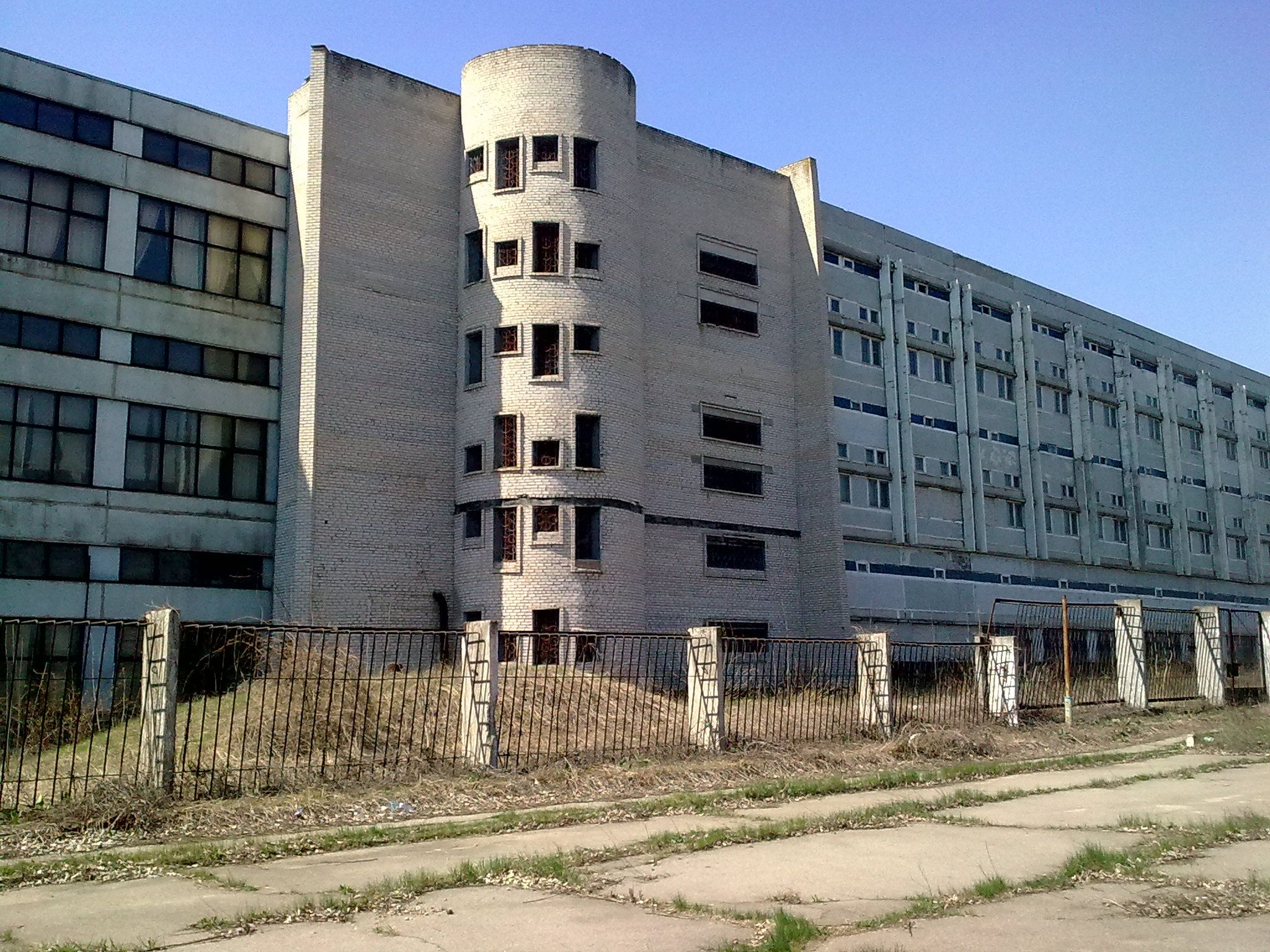
Former factory

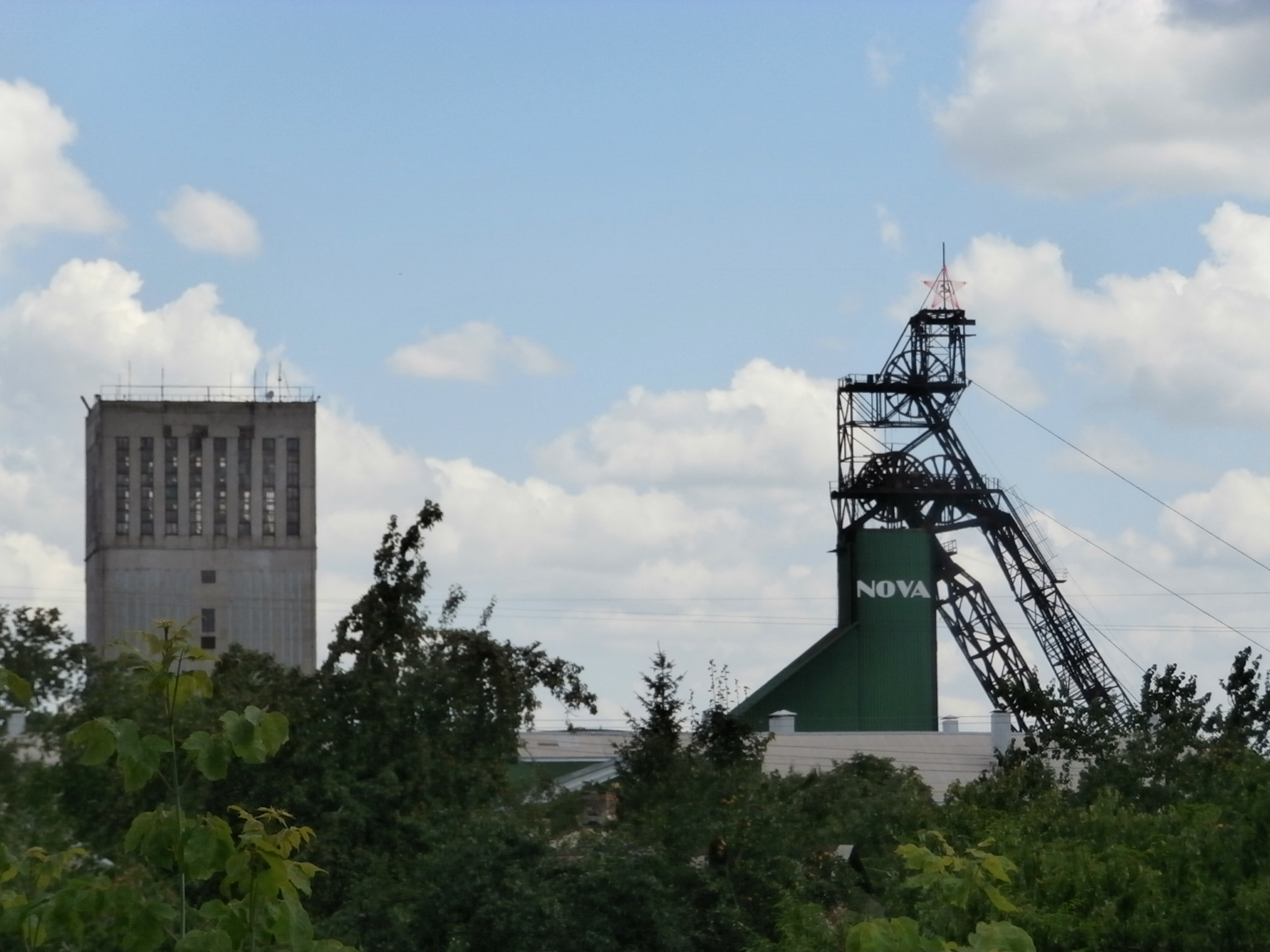
Nova Mine

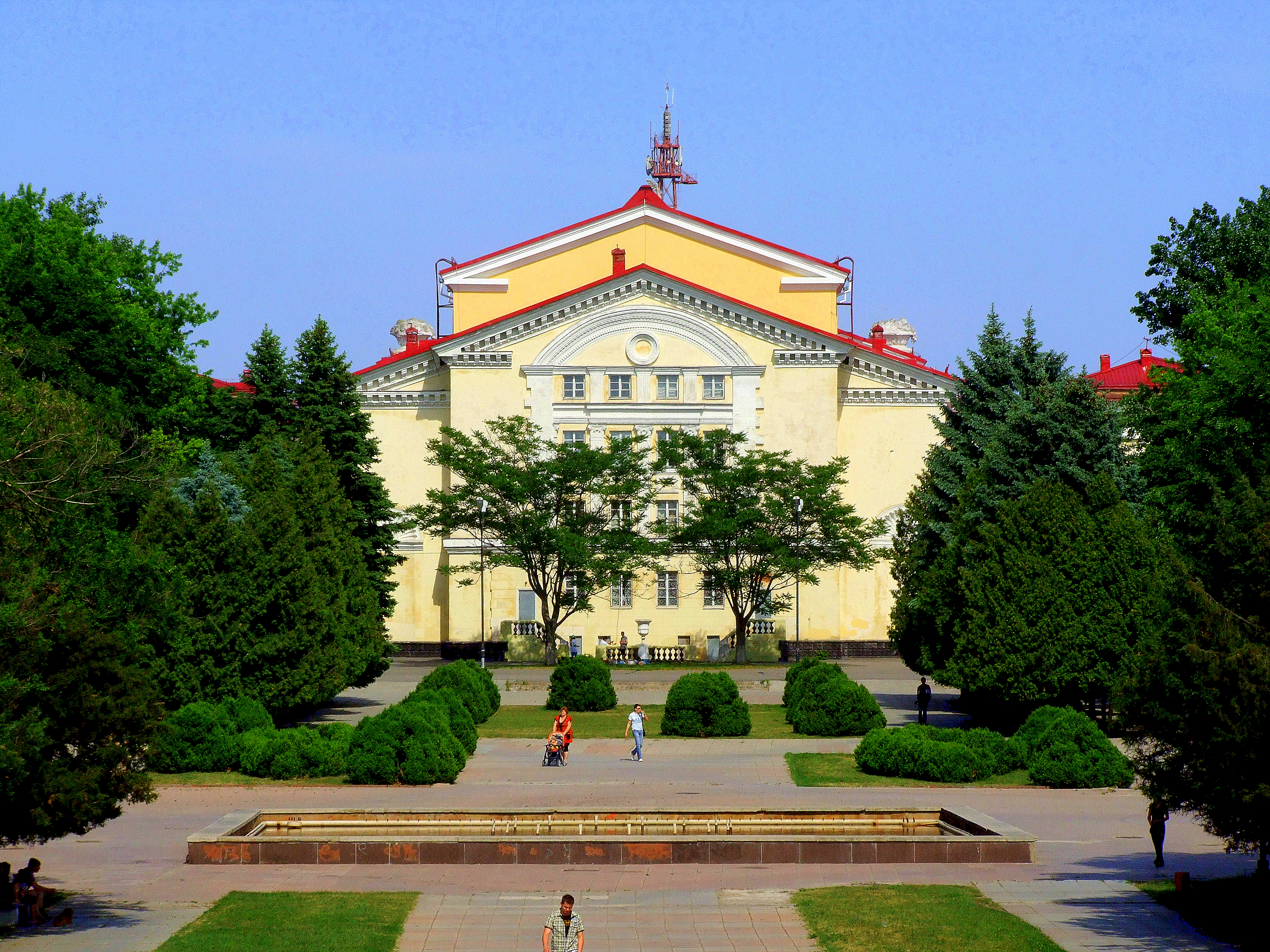
Main street

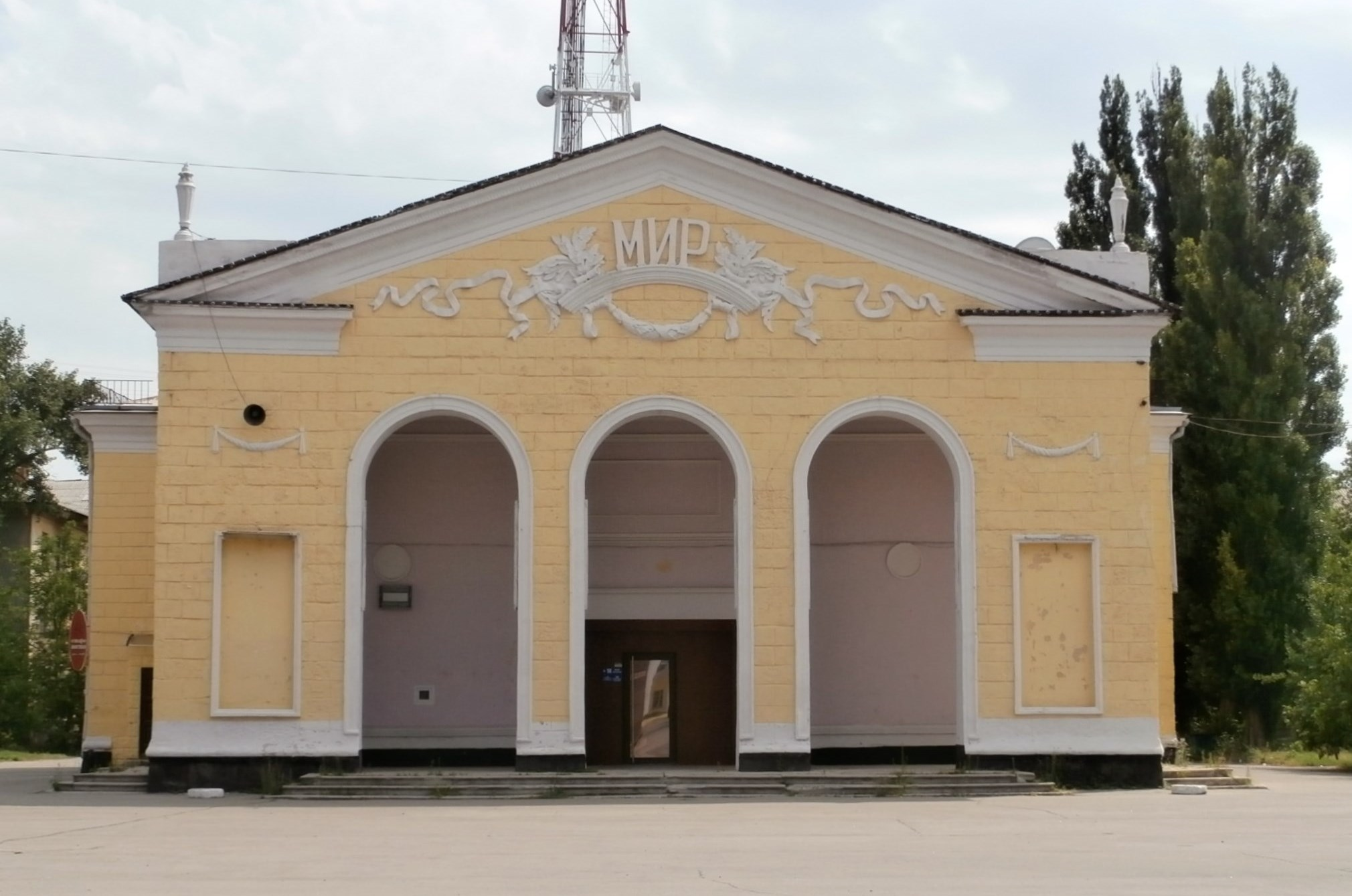
Cinema

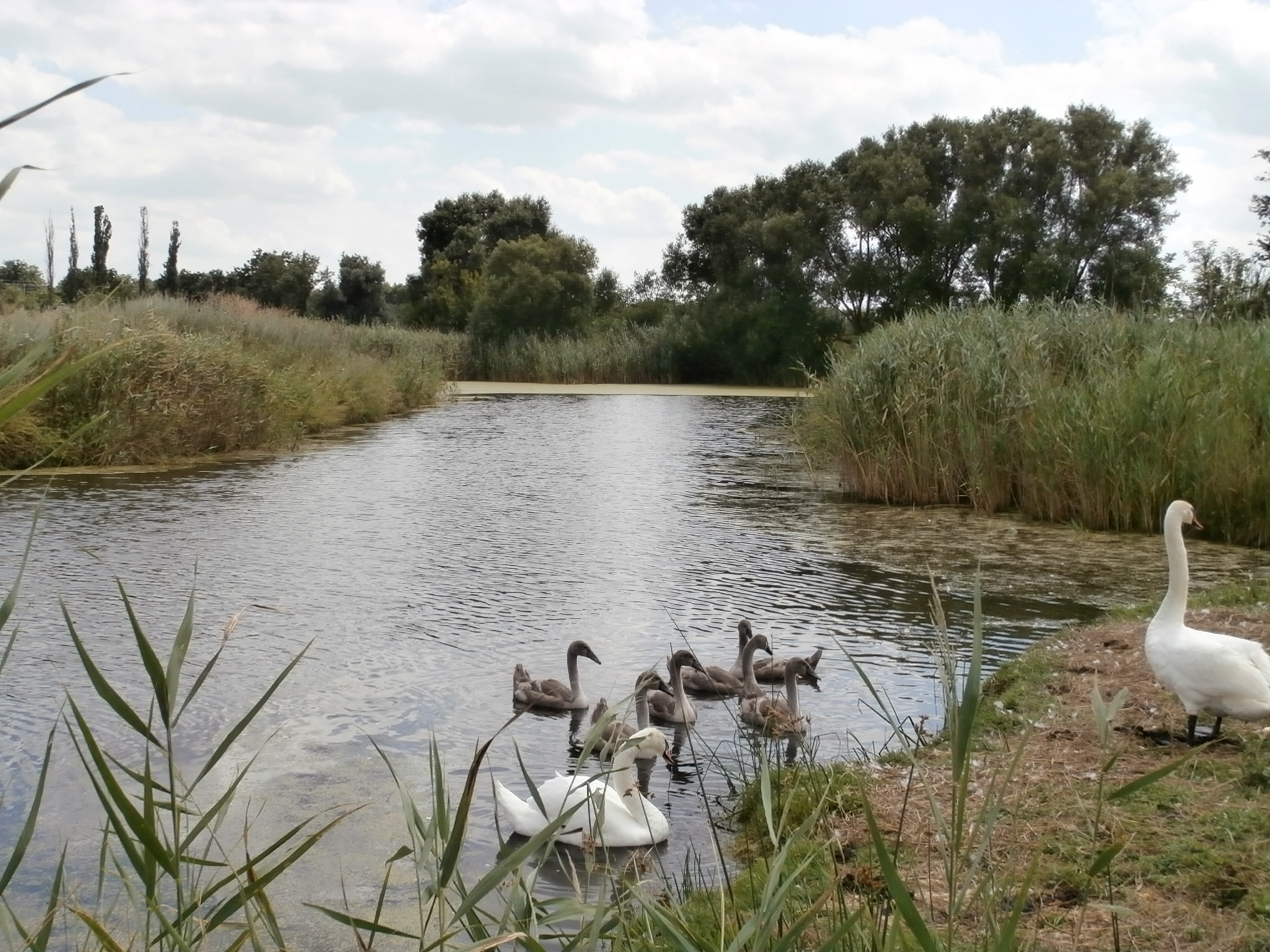
Zhovta River

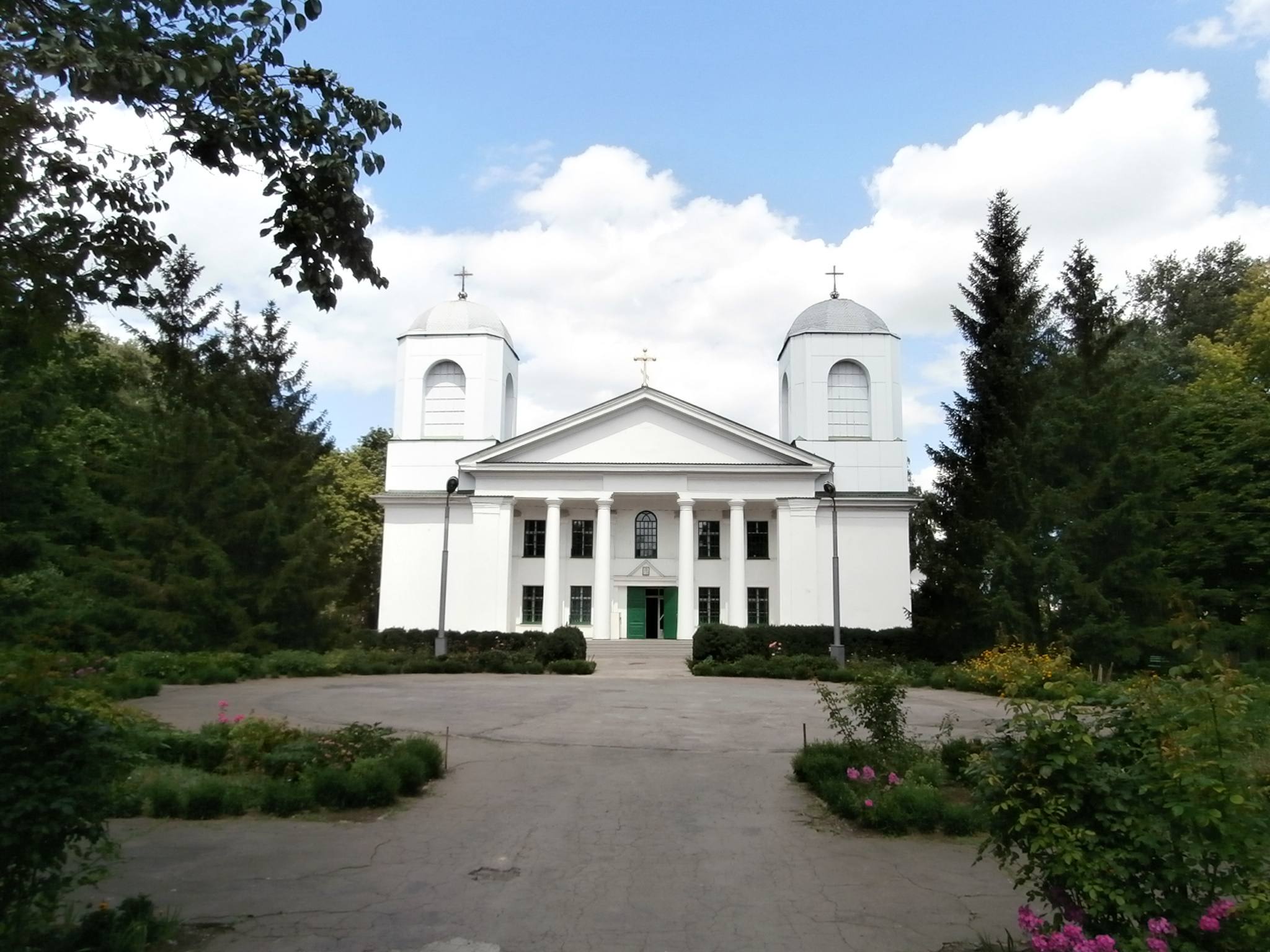
Old Orthodox church

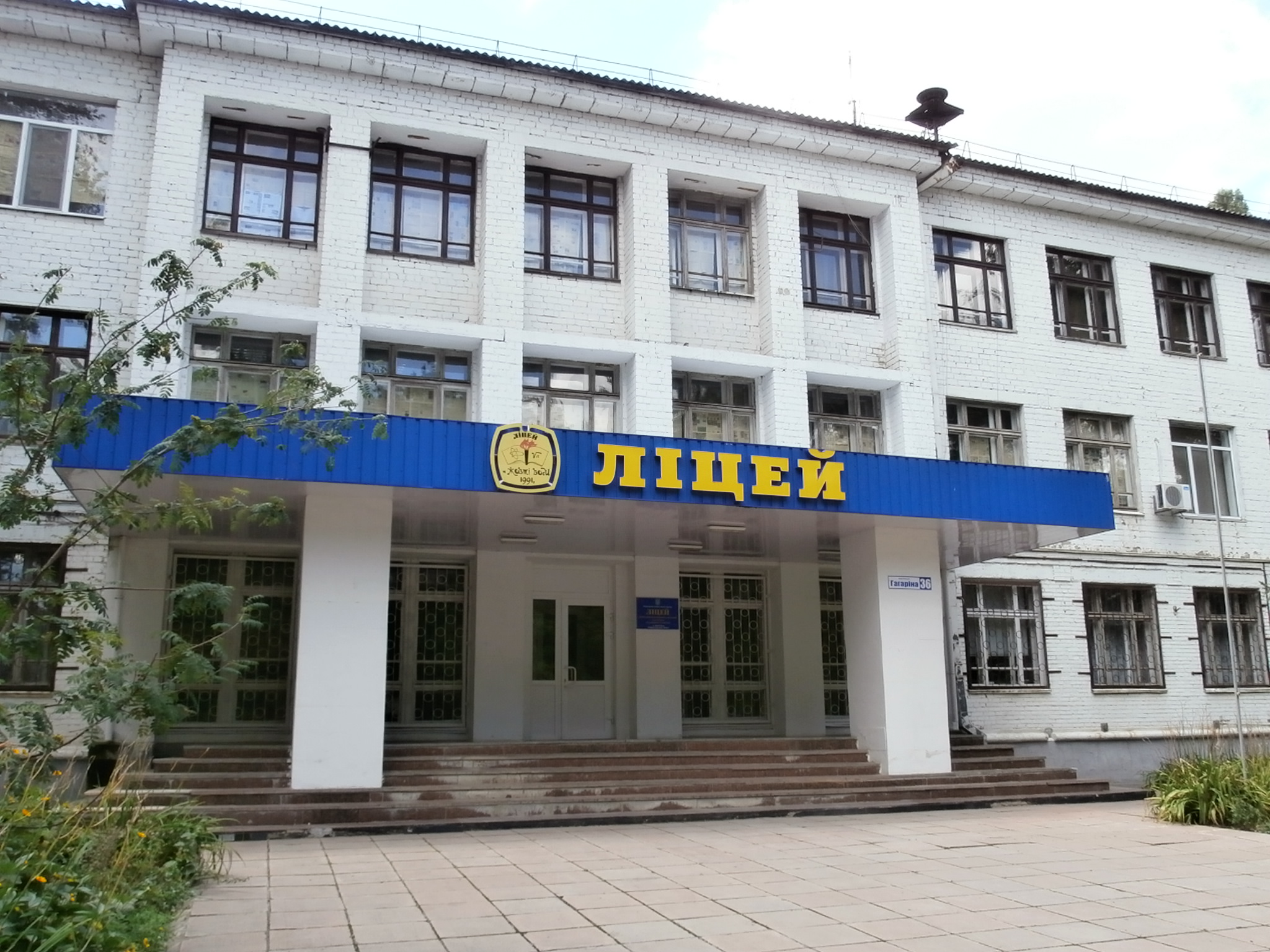
Lycaeum

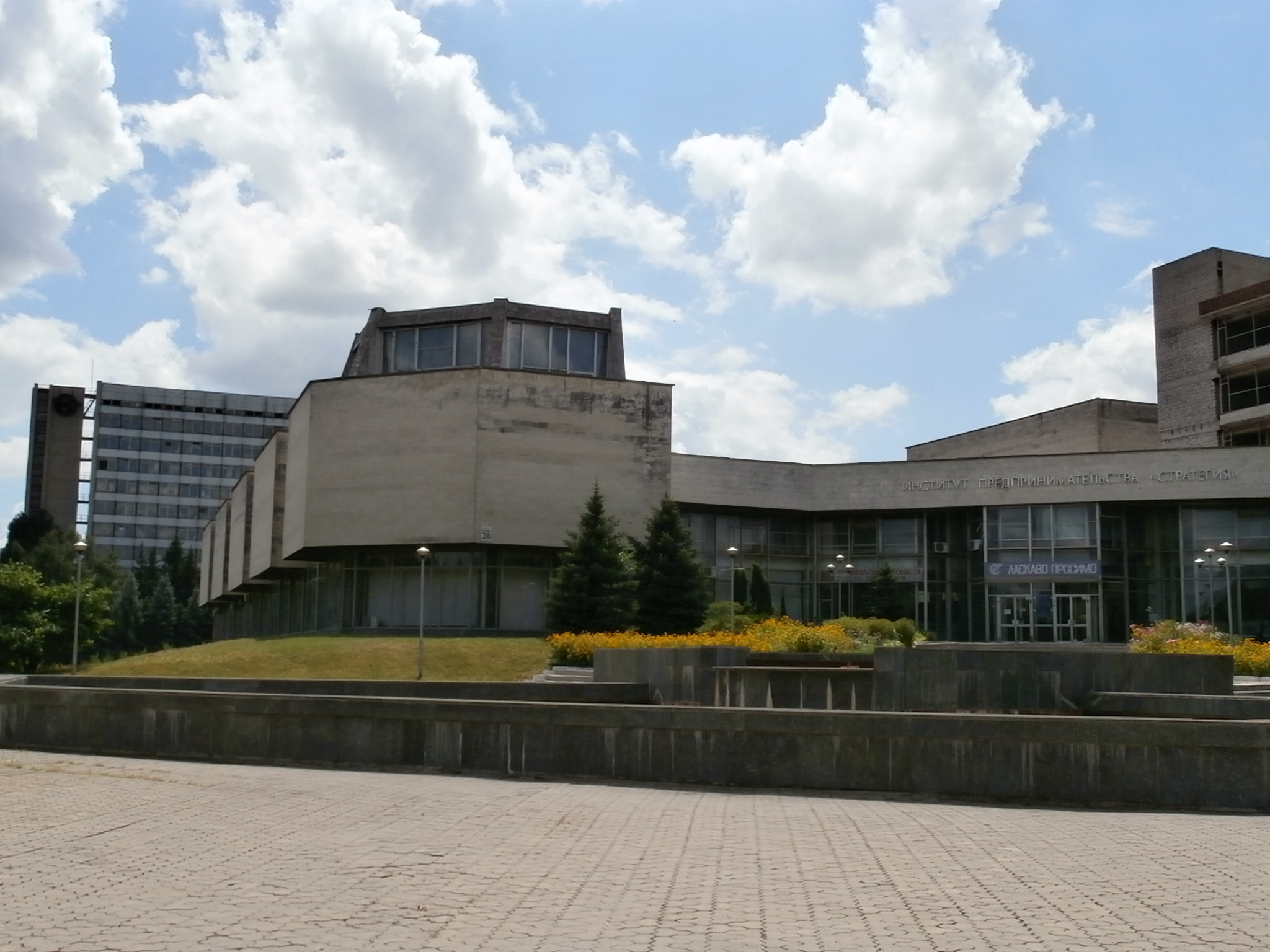
Institute of Business Strategy

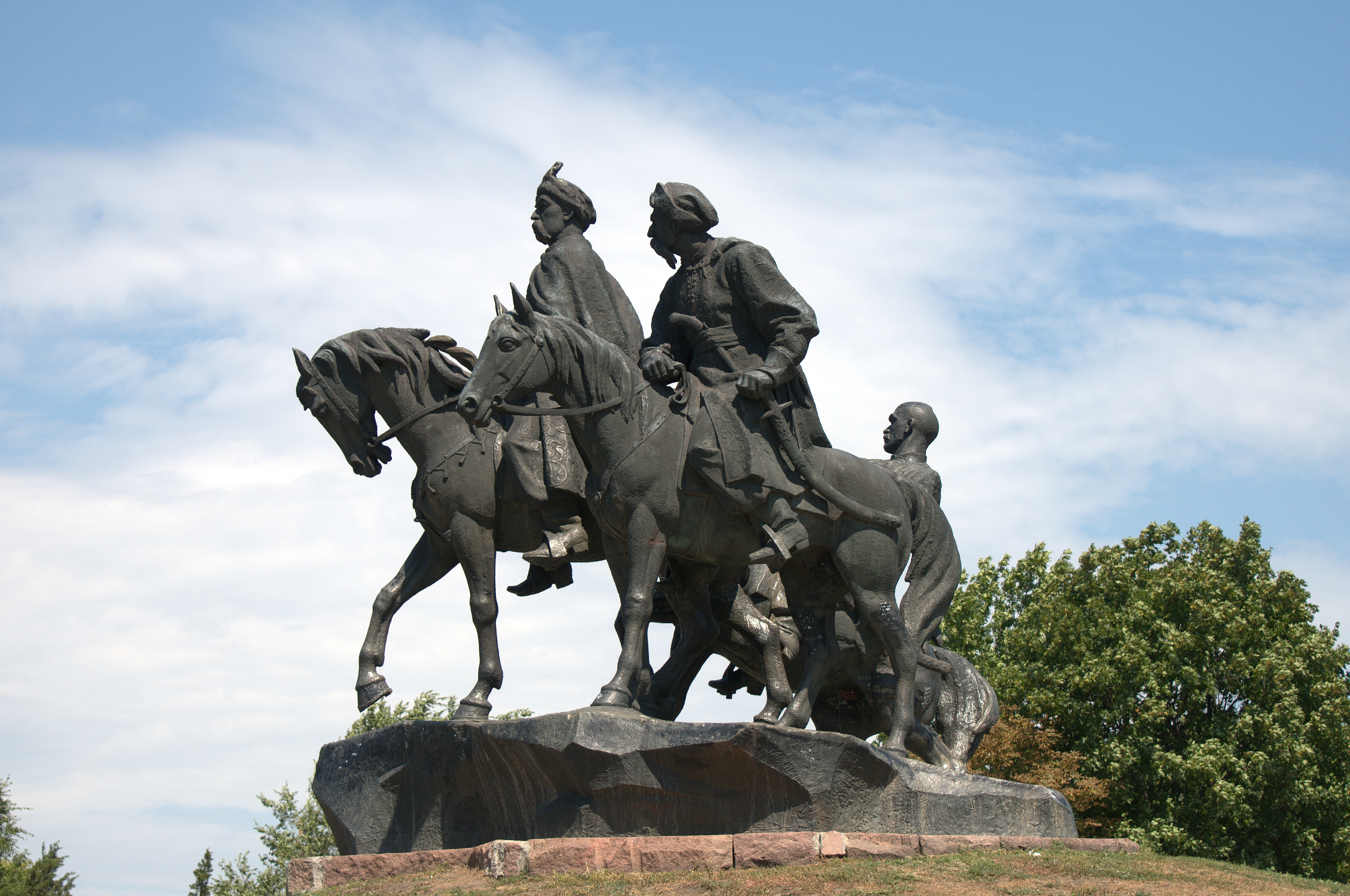
Liberation War monument

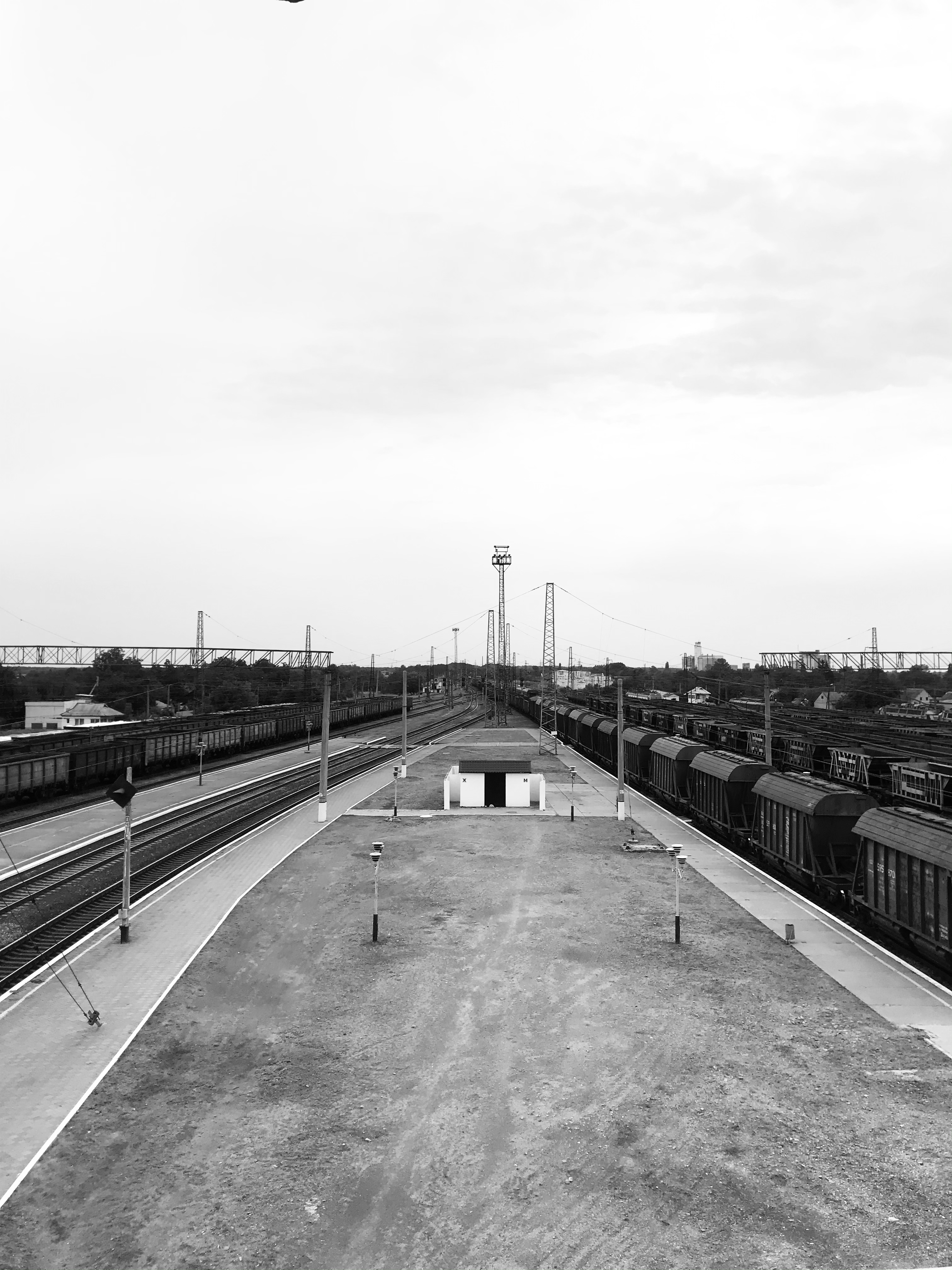
Train station

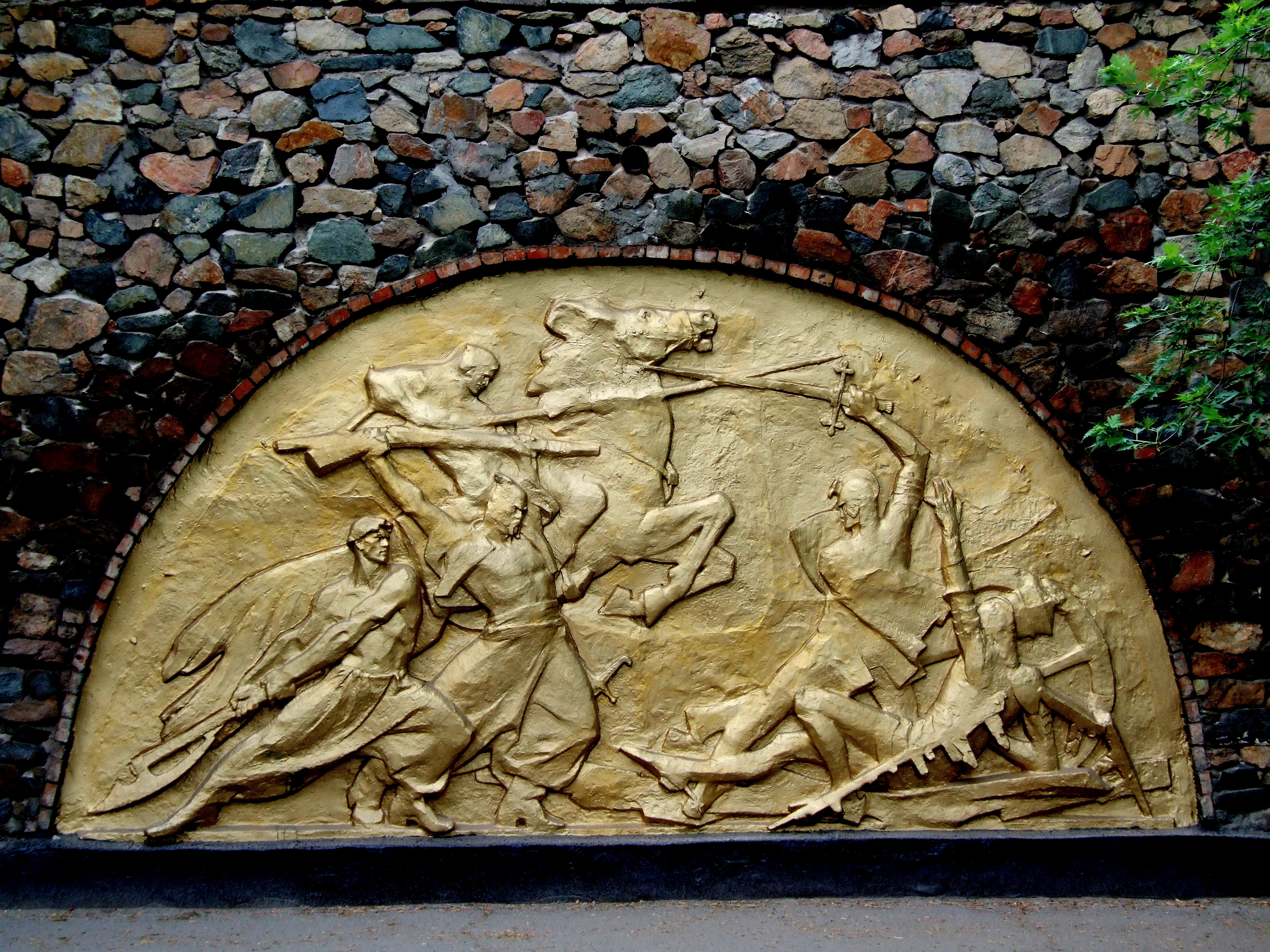
Monument in honor of the battle between the troops of Khmelnytsky and the Polish–Lithuanian Commonwealth

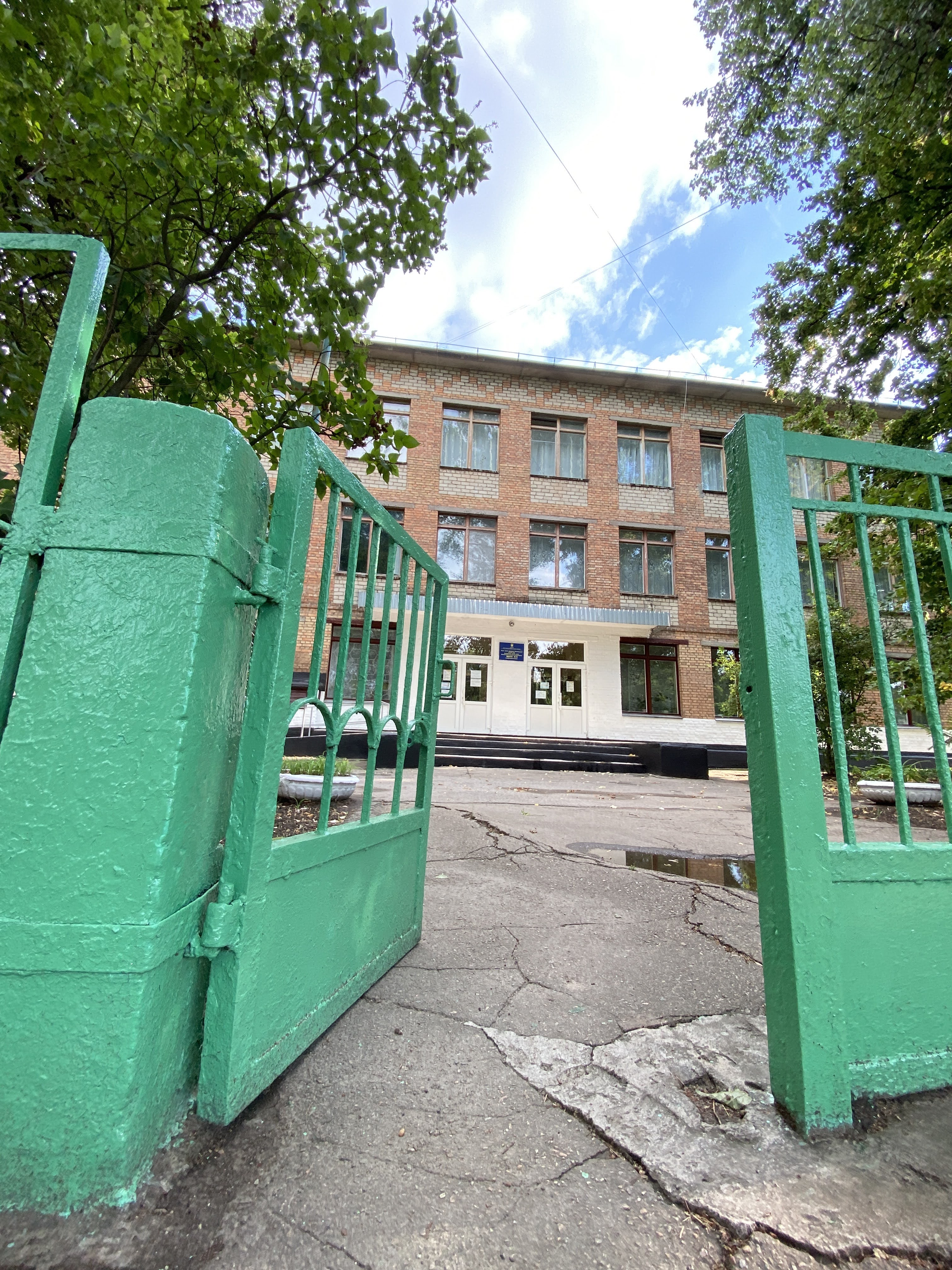
Secondary school No. 10

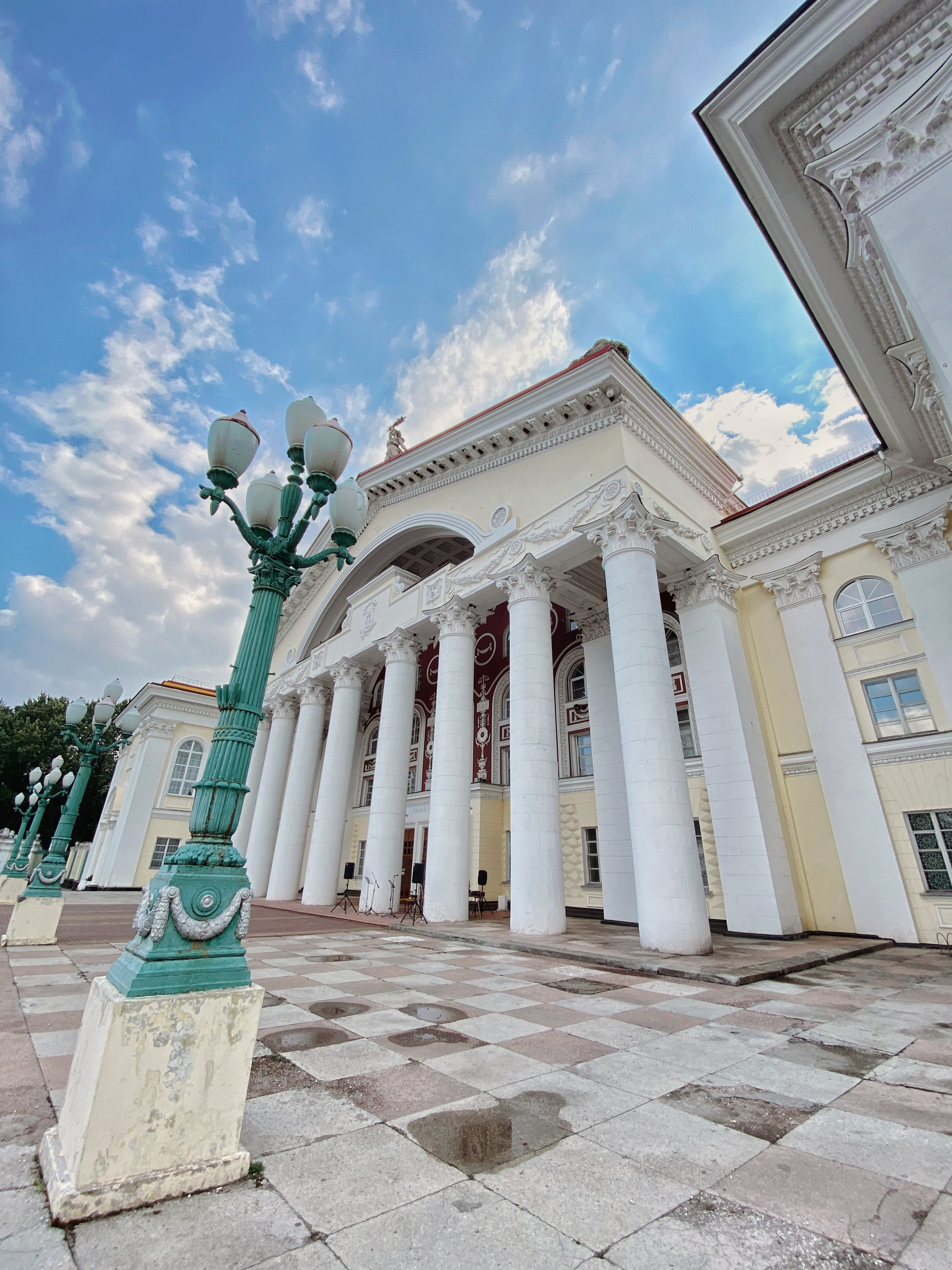
Palace of Culture of Eastern State Enterprise
