= Eastern Mining and Processing Plant =

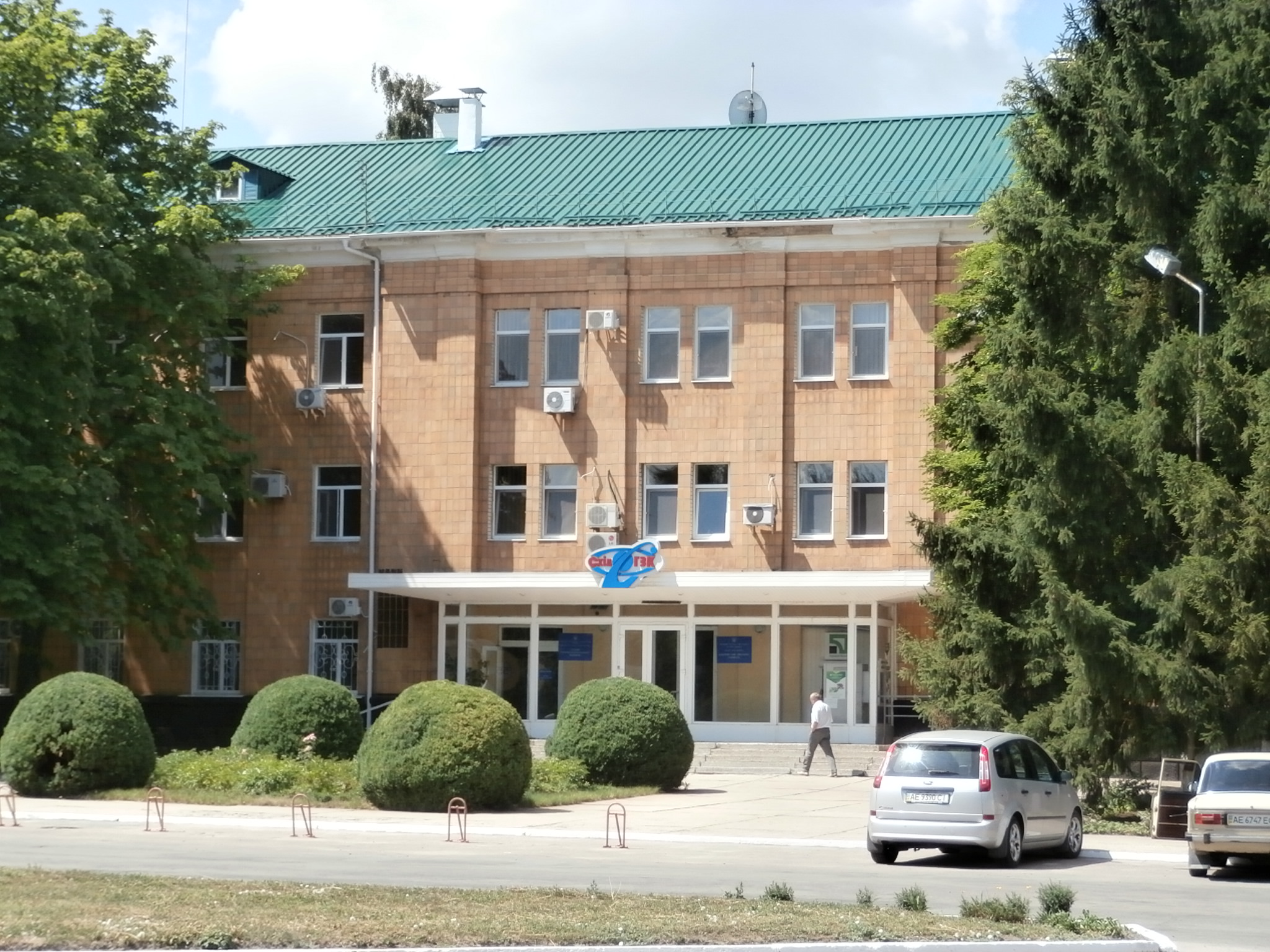
- Built: 1951
- Location: Zhovti Vody, Ukraine
- Industry: mining, iron and uranium ore beneficiation
- Products: Low-enriched uranium
- Employees: 6,644 (2018)
- Area: Kryvyi Rih metropolitan area
- Owner: state enterprise
- Website: http://vostgok.com.ua/

The Eastern Mining and Processing Plant (Ukrainian: Східний гірничо-збагачувальний комбінат, romanized: Skhidnyi hirnycho-sbahachuval'nyi kombinat) is one of the top ten uranium mining and milling facilities in the world, and also the largest one in Europe. The state-owned enterprise, also known as Vostochny Gorno-Obogatitelniy Kombinat (VostGOK) in Russian, is located in the city of Zhovti Vody, Ukraine, with the address Pershotravneva St, 2А, Zhovti Vody, Dnipropetrovsk Oblast, Ukraine, 52200.

According to Ukrainian Metal on their website post of 8 November 2023, "In Kirovohrad Oblast law enforcers revealed managers of the state enterprise Vostochniy Mining and Processing Works on buying metallurgical slag wastes at inflated prices. VostGOK is the largest in Europe and the only in Ukraine extractor of uranium ore and producer of uranium concentrate. According to the Economical Security Bureau, the enterprise announced tenders to buy raw materials, the winners of which were faux companies, that acted as middlemen, while slag wastes were bought directly from manufacturers. Thus, expenses were increased, but taxes minimized. As a result, the state received damages of 1.5 million UAH."
