= Natalia Shliakhtenko =

Russian triathlete

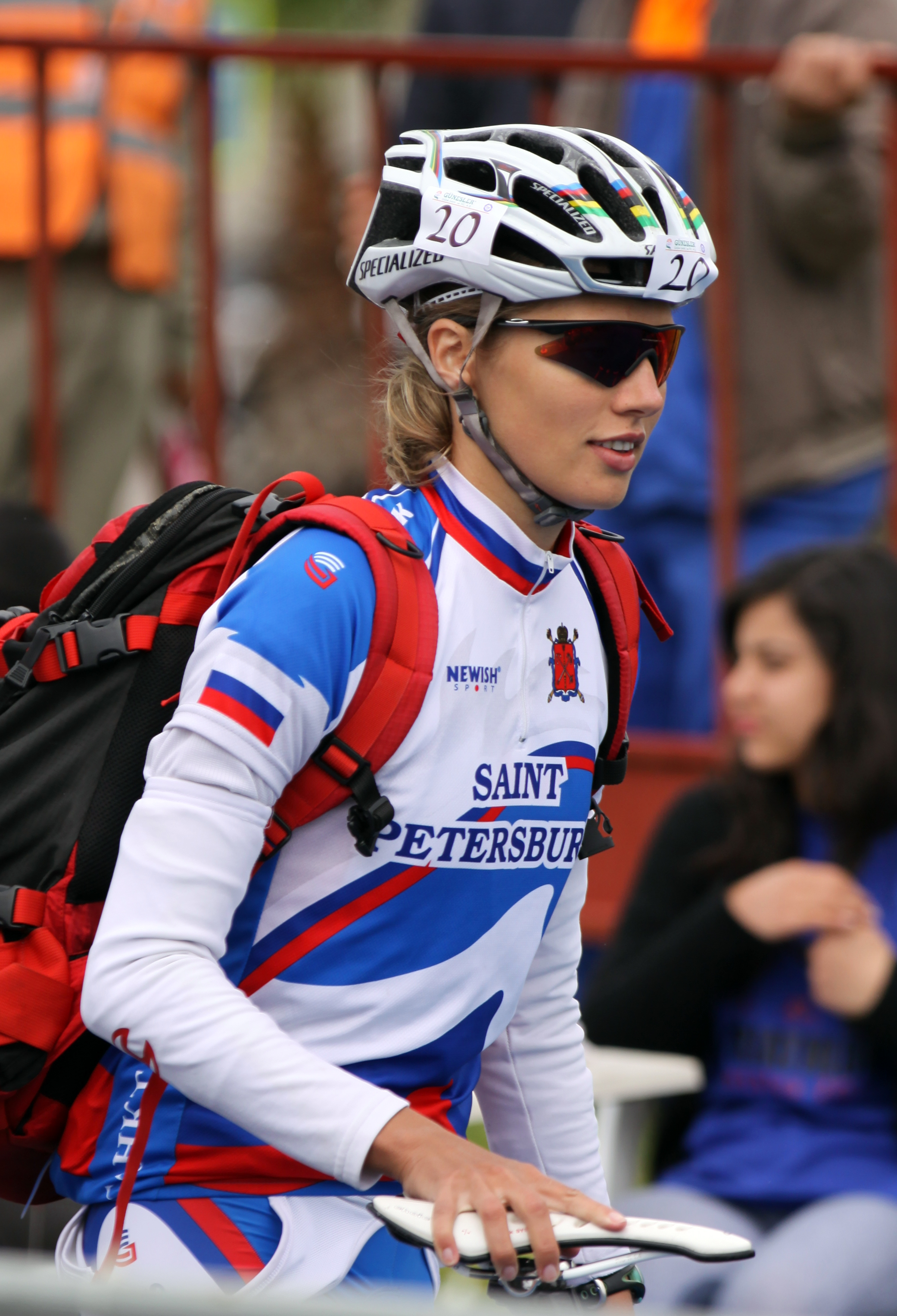
- Natalia Shliakhtenko checking in at the European Cup triathlon in Antalya, 2011

Personal information
- Full name: Natalia Sergeyevna Shliakhtenko
- Nationality: Russian
- Born: 7 July 1987 (age 38) Leningrad, Russian SFSR, Soviet Union

Sport
- Country: Russia
- Sport: Triathlon

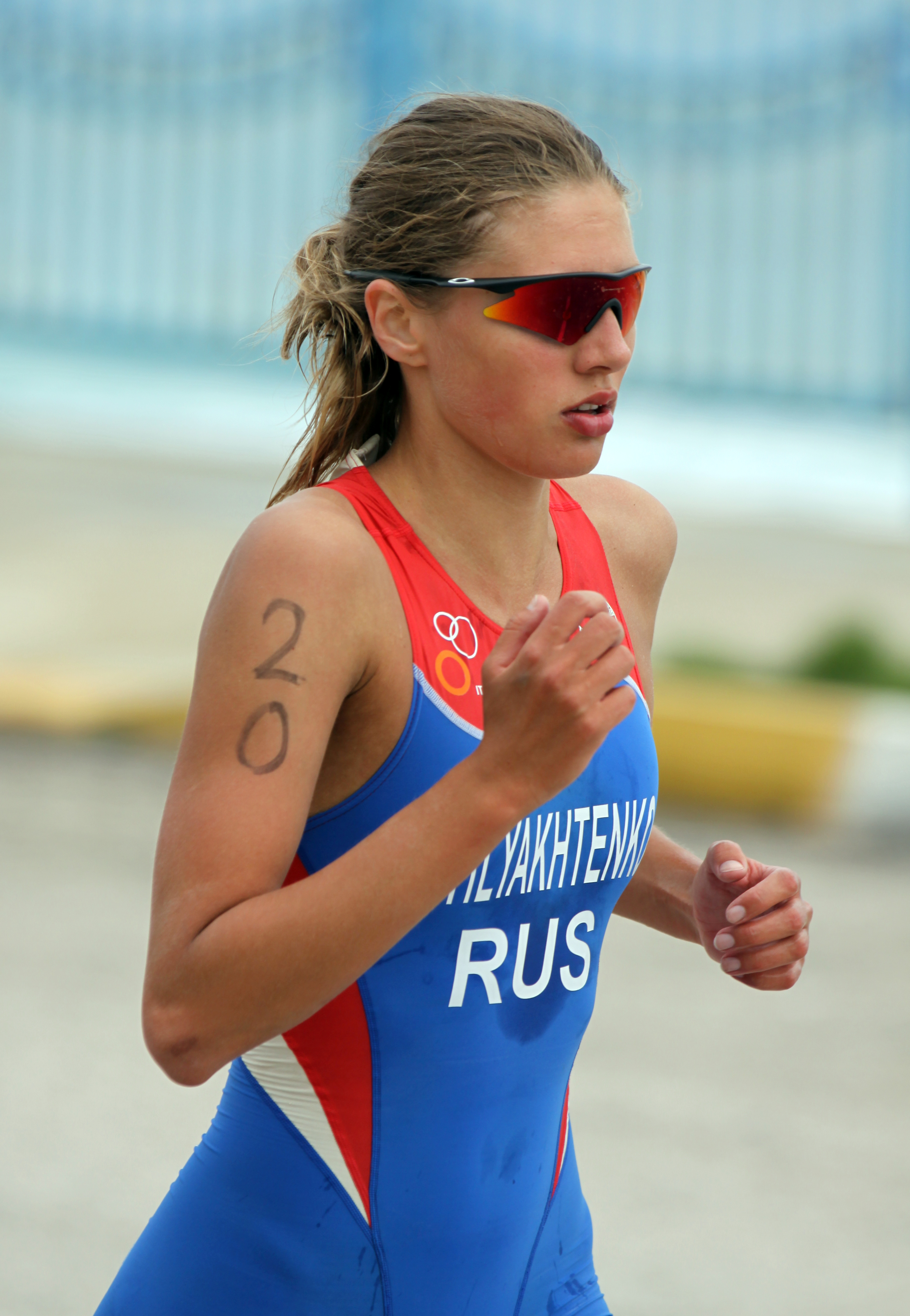
Natalia Shliakhtenko at the European Cup triathlon in Antalya, 2011

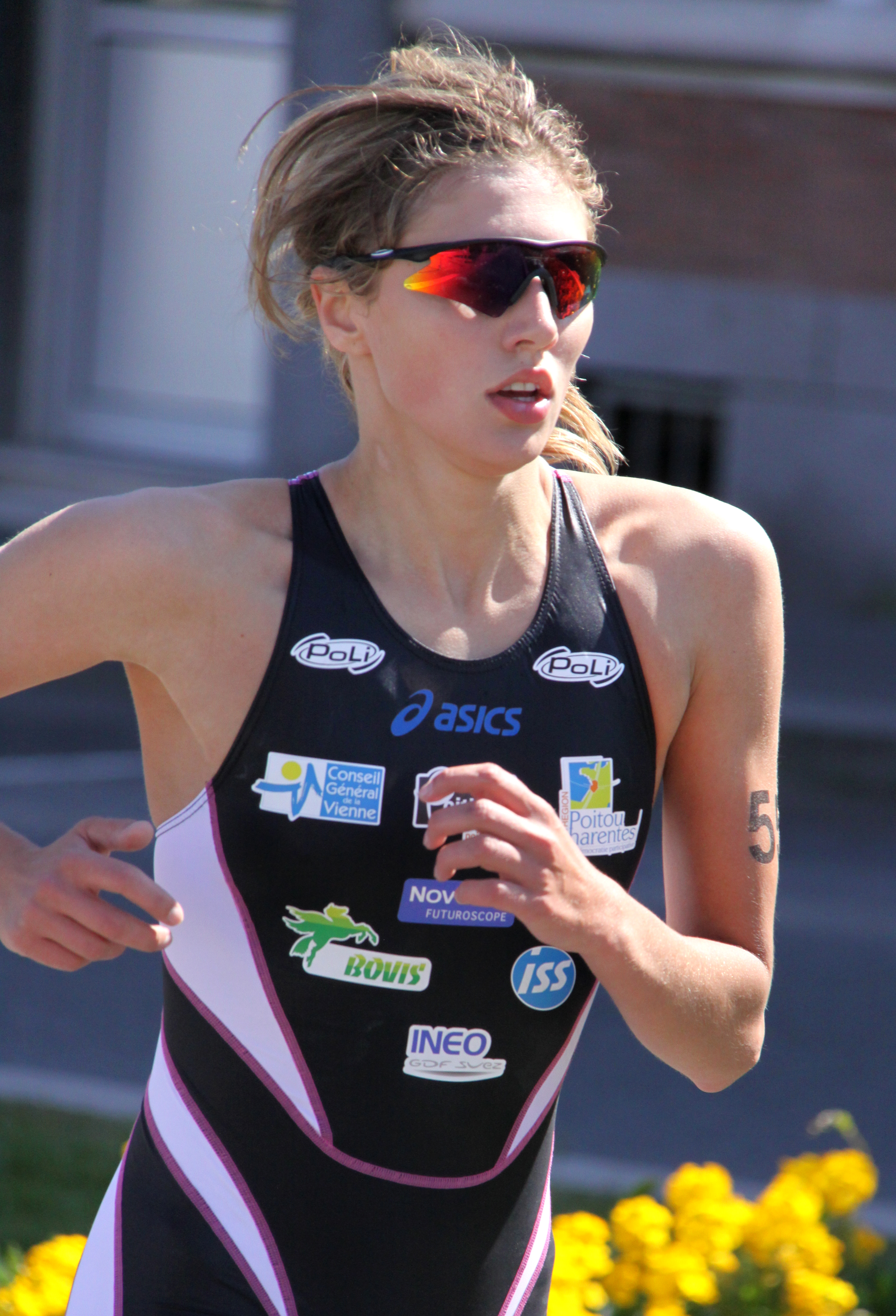
Natalia Shliakhtenko representing Stade Poitevin in the prestigious French Club Championship Series Lyonnaise des Eaux, 2010.

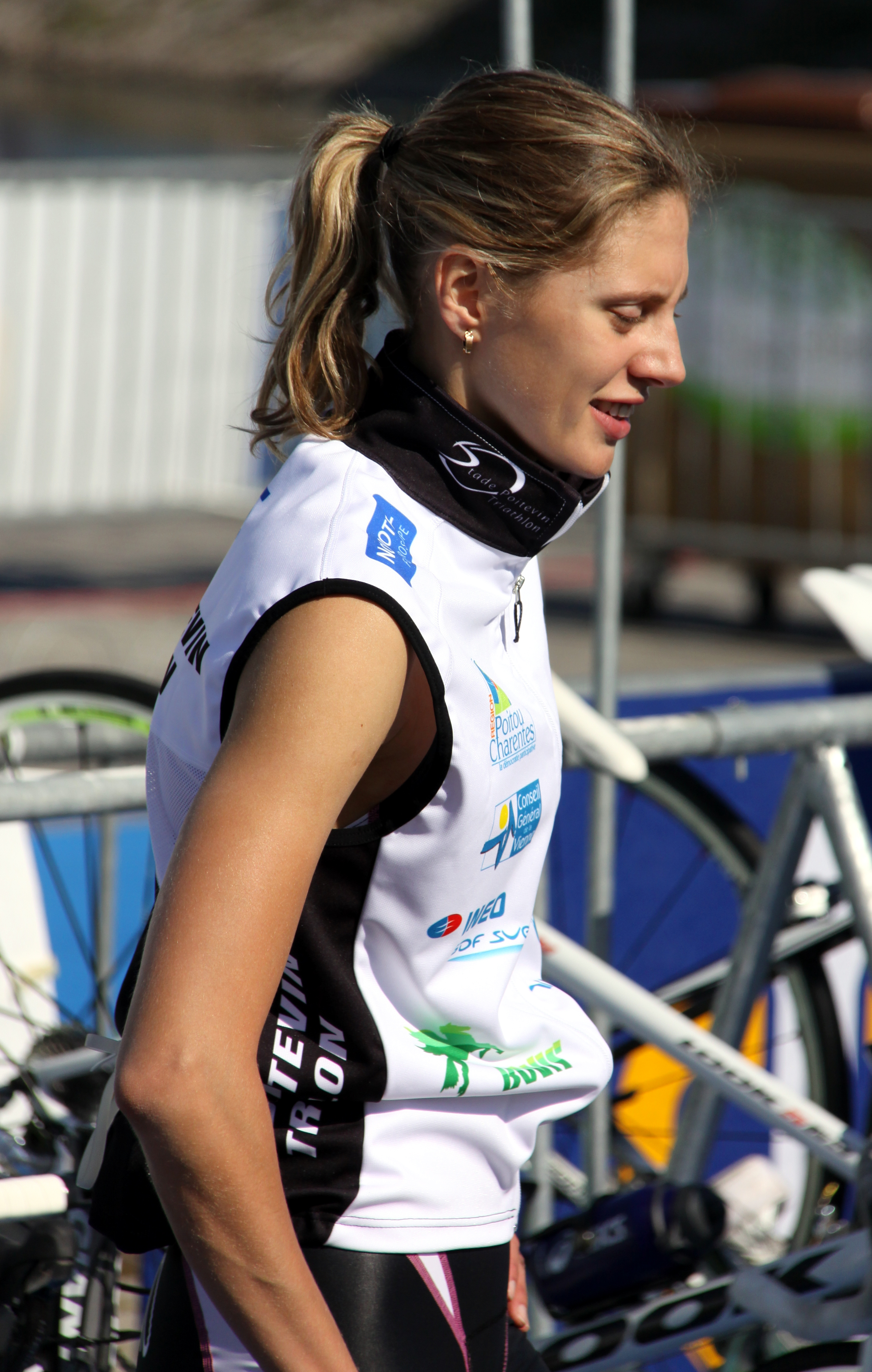
Natalia Shliakhtenko preparing for the Triathlon de Dunkerque, 2010

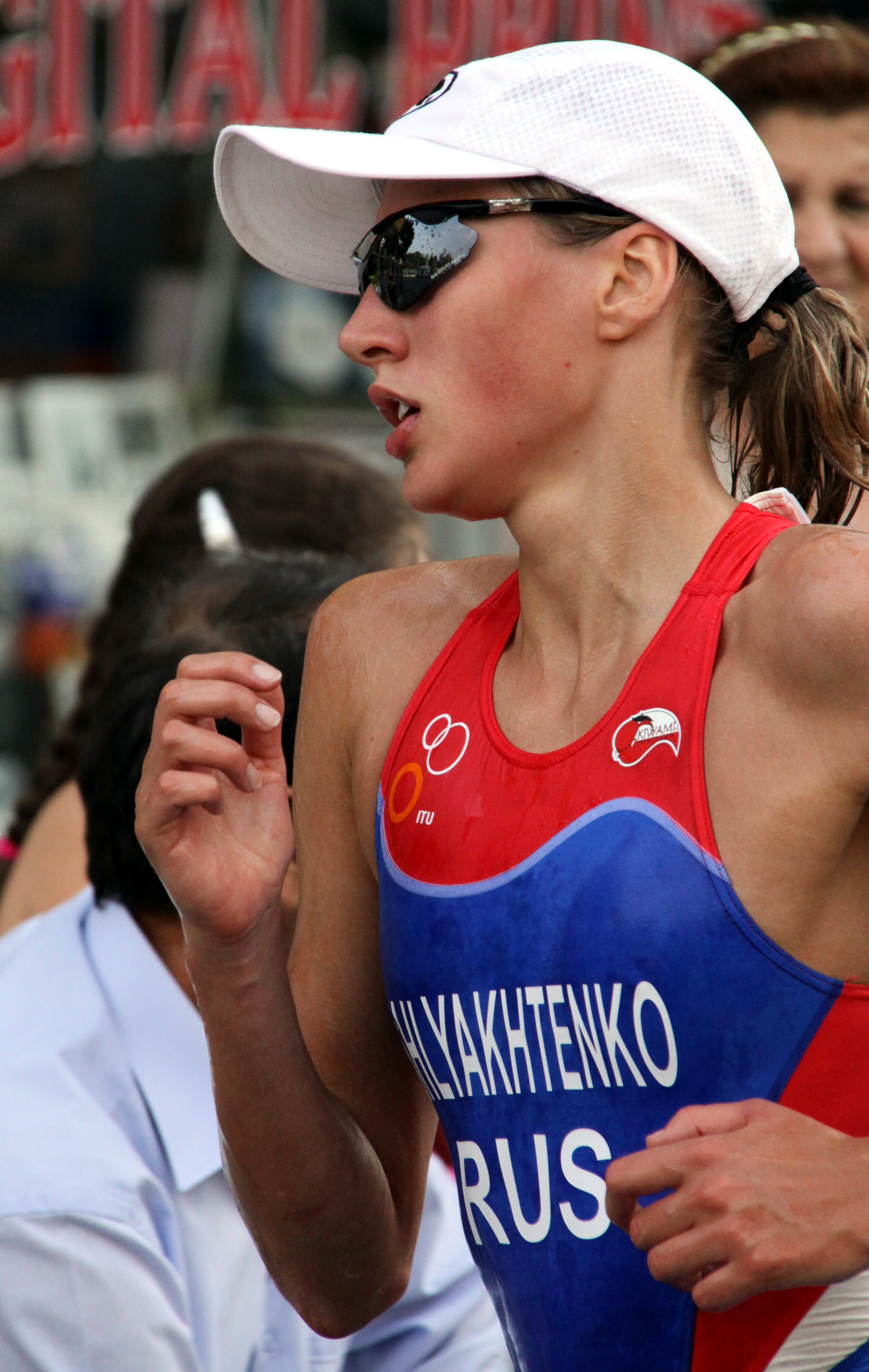
Natalia Shliakhtenko came out of the water first, and also led the bike race in Alanya, 2009.

Natalia Sergeyevna Shliakhtenko (Russian: Наталья Сергеевна Шляхтенко, also transliterated as Natalya Shlyakhtenko; born 7 July 1987) is a Russian professional triathlete, Master of Sport, and reserve member of the National Team.

== Russian Competitions ==
In Russia, Shliakhtenko had her definite breakthrough in the year 2004 when she won the Junior Championships. In 2005 again, she won the Junior Championships and also the team competition of the University Championships for her university, the State Technological and Design University of St. Petersburg (Санкт-Петербургский государственный университет технологии и дизайна), finishing in the second place in the individual ranking. In the subsequent year, she took part in the First Summer Spartakiad of the Russian Youth (Первая Летняя Спартакиада молодежи России) held in Khanty-Mansiysk on 2 August 2006, and won the gold medal in triathlon. For this great success she was included into a ministerial list of some 600 meritorious young sportsmen and sportswomen to be granted 60,000 rubles each. In this list, however, a state-run elite sports school (Государственное учреждение среднего профессионального образования «Санкт-Петербургское училище олимпийского резерва № 1», г. Санкт-Петербургa) is given as Natalia Shliakhtenko's institution, not the Technological University for which she won gold in the previous year. In the years 2008/09 and 2009/10, Shliakhtenko also won the swimming championship (50m) of her university.

At the Russian Championships of the year 2009 in Penza she represented her St. Petersburg club Dinamo and placed third in the U23 Sprint and fourth in the U23 competition on the Olympic Distance. In the team ranking, however, she placed fourth in the Elite category. According to the Russian Triathlon Federation's ranking of the year 2009 she was number 7 among all Russian female elite triathletes and placed fifth in the Russian Cup, sharing this position with Yevgeniya Sukhoruchenkova. In the same year, she was conferred upon the prestigious title Master of Sports (Мастер срорта России) and had almost won two medals at two Asian Cup triathlons, which, however, were not competitive since in Kokshetau, for instance, apart from Shliakhtenko there were only four female competitors, one from Ukraine (Inna Tsyganok placing 1st) and three from Russia.

In 2009 Shliakhtenko also won the silver medal at the World Police and Fire Games in Canada (8 August 2009) representing the Russian Home Affairs Ministry.

At the Russian Triathlon Championships of the year 2010 she won the U23 bronze medal on the Olympic Distance behind Burova and Mariya Shorets, in the Elite Russian Cup ranking she placed second although she took part in only two of the seven events, and she was no. 7 in the overall female ranking (Рейтинг).

At the Russian Elite Aquathlon Championships 2011, Shliakhtenko placed 6th.

At the World Police and Fire Games 2011 in New York, Shliakhtenko again represented the Russian Home Affairs Ministry as a Senior Police Sergeant (старший сержант полици) and won 10 medals in various swimming and running disciplines.

== French Club Championship Series ==
In 2010, like the Ukrainian triathlete Inna Tsyganok, Shliakhtenko represented Stade Poitevin Triathlon at the prestigious French Club Championship Series Lyonnaise des Eaux. At the first triathlon of this circuit at Dunkirk (23 May 2010), Shliakhtenko placed 38th and, as her club's second best runner, she was among the three athlètes classants l'equipe, all of whom were foreign guest stars: Felicity Sheedy Ryan (Australia, 22nd), Shliakhtenko (Russia, 38th) and Holly Lawrence (Great Britain, 49th). Nevertheless, the club's president, Bruno Grignard, was discontented.

At the Grand Prix triathlon in Paris Shliakhtenko placed 24th.

In 2011, Shlyakhtenko is not part of Stade Poitevin Triathlon any longer. At the Triathlon de Dunkerque (22 May 2011), however, she again represented Stade Poitevin replacing Holly Lawrence although Shlyakhtenko's name does not appear in the official start list. Shlyakhtenko placed 33rd in the individual ranking.

== ITU Competitions ==
In the eight years from 2003 to 2010, Shliakhtenko took part in 17 ITU competitions and achieved 6 top ten positions.

Natalia's sisters Galina, who is also a well known free diver and the Russian 2010 free diving silver medalist, and Tanya placed 19th and 26th at the same triathlon in Alanya.

Unless indicated otherwise, all the following events are triathlons (Olympic Distance) and belong to the Elite category.

Date	ITU Competition	Place	Rank
2003-10-22	European Cup	Alanya	22
2004-10-27	European Cup	Alanya	16
2005-07-23	European Championships (Junior)	Alexandroupoli(s)	41
2005-10-26	Premium European Cup	Alanya	27
2006-06-23	European Championships (Junior)	Autun	29
2006-09-02	World Championships (Junior)	Lausanne	38
2006-10-18	European Cup (Junior)	Alanya	1
2007-07-21	European Championships (U23)	Kuopio	19
2007-07-21	European Championships (U23): Women Team Relay	Kuopio	4
2007-10-24	Premium European Cup	Alanya	23
2008-06-28	9th University World Championships (Elite)	Erdek	26
2008-10-26	Premium European Cup	Alanya	10
2009-07-05	Premium Asia Cup	Burabay	5
2009-07-12	Asia Cup	Kokshetau	4
2009-10-25	Premium European Cup	Alanya	12
2010-04-11	European Cup	Quarteira	DSQ
2010-10-24	Premium European Cup	Alanya	9
2011-04-03	European Cup	Antalya	25
