= Kryvyi Rih metropolitan area =

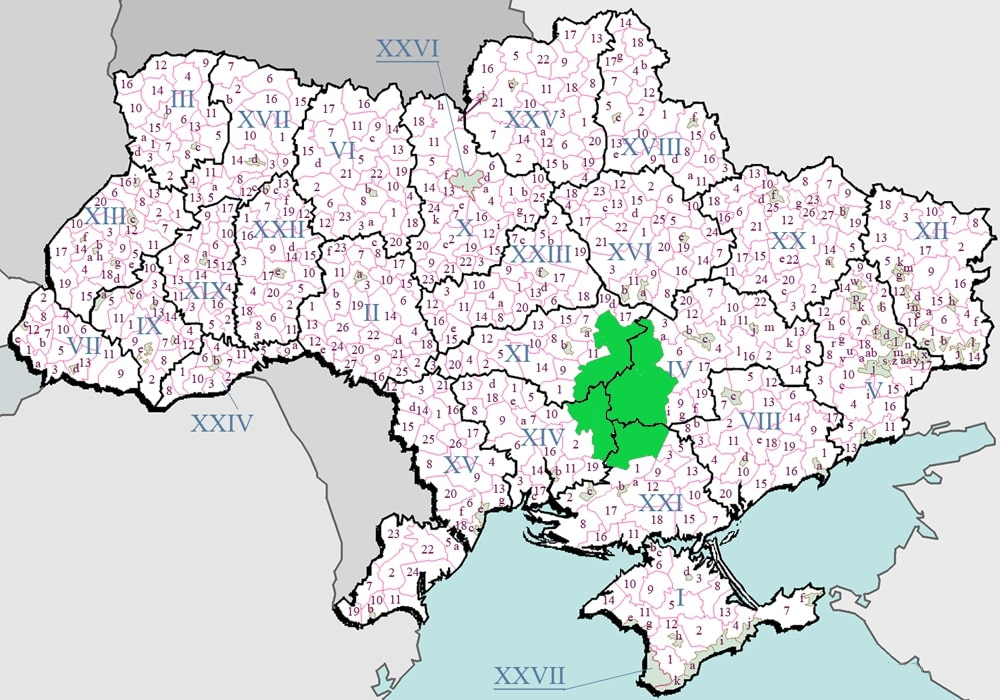
Kryvyi Rih metropolitan area Криворізька агломерація Kryvyy Rih metropolitan area in Ukraine
- Interactive map of Kryvyi Rih metropolitan area
- Largest cities: Kryvyi Rih; Oleksandriia; Zhovti Vody

Area
  - Metro: 19,919 km^{2} (7,691 sq mi)

Population (2019)
  - Metro: 1,170,953
  - Metro density: 58.786/km^{2} (152.25/sq mi)

Kryvyi Rih metropolitan area, or Kryvbas, is a metropolitan area in central (by the most part) and southern Ukraine. With a population of one million, it is one of seven largest metropolitan regions (million-plus each) in Ukraine. It consists of a couple big industrial cities and some smaller ones, townsides and rural areas.

From east to west, the region includes the cities of Kryvyi Rih, Zhovti Vody, Oleksandriia, Dolynska, Novyi Buh as well as parts of the more rural raions and (factually) includes far more territories in central and southern parts of Ukraine. The Kryvyi Rih metro area doesn't have an administrative center, each city in the area has its own administration.

== History ==
=== Russian Empire ===
The presence of iron ore in the regions around Kryvyi Rih has been known since at least 1781 and was rumoured before; being known to the ancients. Throughout the 1800s the region was investigated for its mineral wealth. Iron ore of 70% iron content and manganese ores were found. In 1881 the industrial extraction of iron ore from the near region began, alongside other developments such as the construction of the Kryvyi Rih railway. By 1884 over 100,000 tons of iron ore had been extracted, and the railway though Kryvyi Rih (the Yekateryninska railway), 477 versts (505,6 km) long, from Yasynuvata station via Kryvyi Rih to Dolynska station had been opened. The production expanded rapidly in the next years, as it did in other industrialized regions and countries. By 1896 there were 20 mines producing over 1,000,000 tonnes of ore in the Kryvyi Rih Basin, and the population had exploded though the toll on the health of the working men had begun to be noticed. Industrial expansion continued in the region up to 1917. Production dropped during the first world war due to lack of labour.

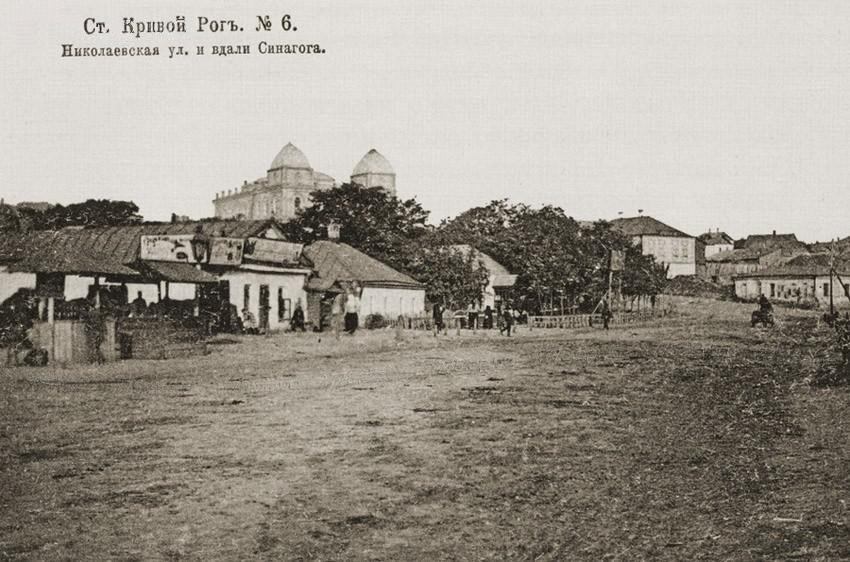
Kryvyi Rih c. 1905

=== USSR ===
After the formation of the Soviet Union and the expulsion of Austro-Hungarian forces and then anti-communist forces under Anton Denikin occupying the region relative normalcy was resumed. Planning for the Kryvorizhstal began in 1929, with the intention being to produce an integrated steel plant taking iron ore and carbon all the way to finished steel products. In 1931 the chairman of the Supreme Economic Council of the USSR - Grigori (Sergo) Ordzhonikidze signed a decree ordering its construction and the same year the foundation stone of the metallurgical works was laid, workers included prison labourers, and initially German and Americans as well. In August 1934 the first metal was produced at Kryvorizhstal; then known as 'Kryvyi Rih Metallurgical Works' (Криворожский металлургический комбинат)

Before the onset second world war the works operated 3 blast furnaces (of 3,160m^{3}) and 2 open hearth furnaces along with a heat and power Kryvorizhstal, in 1941 a blooming mill of 1.7 million tonnes p.a. and a fourth blast furnace and a third open hearth furnace came on line shortly before nazi occupation.

==== World War II ====
Prior to occupation by German military forces equipment and workers were evacuated to Nizhny Tagil in Siberia. During the German administration (from the 14th of August 1941 to the 22nd of February 1944), the Kryvorizhstal was destroyed.

==== Post-war period ====
After the recapture of the area the complex was rebuilt, and continued to grow again; blast furnace No.7 was built in 1962, in 1970 blast furnace No.8 was built making the Kryvorizhstal the largest in Europe, and in 1974 blast furnace No.9 was opened the biggest in the world with a volume of 5000m^{3}.

=== Independent Ukraine ===
From the 1990s until 2004, once united and state-owned industries went through a hard and scandal-ridden process of privatization.

==== Kryvyi Rih Oxidized Ores Mining and Beneficiation Works (KGZKOR) ====
Construction of the plant in Dolynska town of Kirovohrad Oblast began back in 1985 as a joint project of the USSR, Romania, Slovakia, Germany and Bulgaria. In the early 1990s, construction of the plant was frozen. Following negotiations among the investors, Bulgaria and Germany then exited the project. The main shareholders remained Ukraine with 56.4% of the shares, Romania – 28% and Slovakia – 15.6%.

In 2007, Romania and Slovakia, the main construction partners, withdrew from the project and expressed a desire to return their investment. Ukraine's debt under KGZKOR as of January 1, 2007 to Romania was $353 million, Slovakia – $115.1 million, Bulgaria – $1.4 million, Germany – $47.34 million. The total debt was $517.43 million.

Romania planned to sell its stake in KGZKOR to steel & mining group ArcelorMittal on condition that the group doubled steel production at its Romanian plant ArcelorMittal Galati.

ArcelorMitall also made an offer to Ukraine for KGZKOR, but a planned tender was canceled unexpectedly following a face-off between the Ukrainian government and the then president of Ukraine, Viktor Yushchenko.

$1.5 billion was spent on the project, but 30 years after the collapse of the USSR, the enterprise never started working, and its readiness remained at 65%.

In January 2022 the Kryvyi Rih-based company Rudomain LLC acquired part of property of the Ukraine-owned unfinished industrial giant for ₴451 million (which equaled around $18 million).

KGZKOR is about 70% finished, but still requires another $800 million in investment to finish construction.

== Economy ==
The economy is largely based on industry and exports.

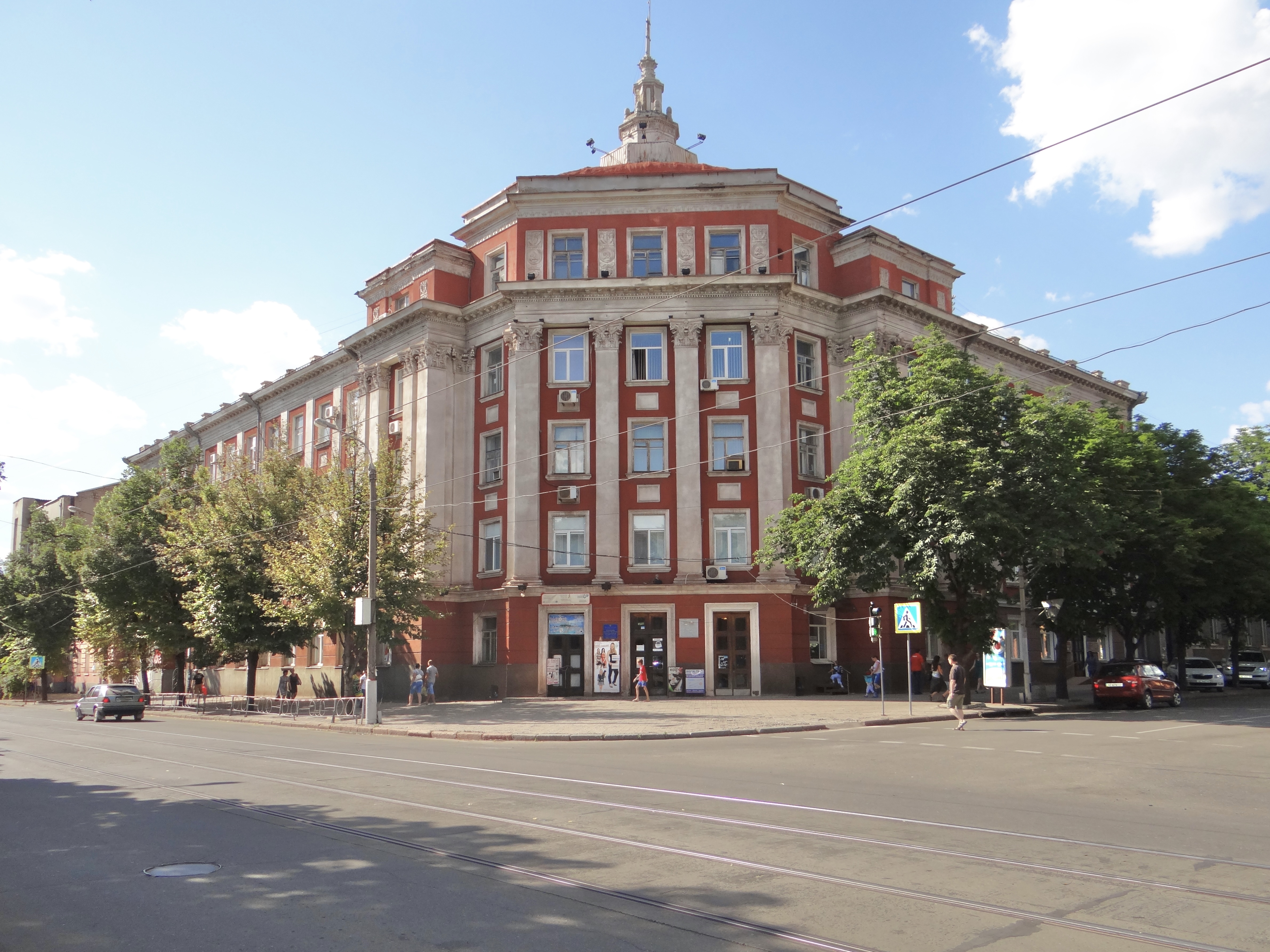
The South Ore's head office in the historical centre of Kryvyi Rih

=== Largest companies ===
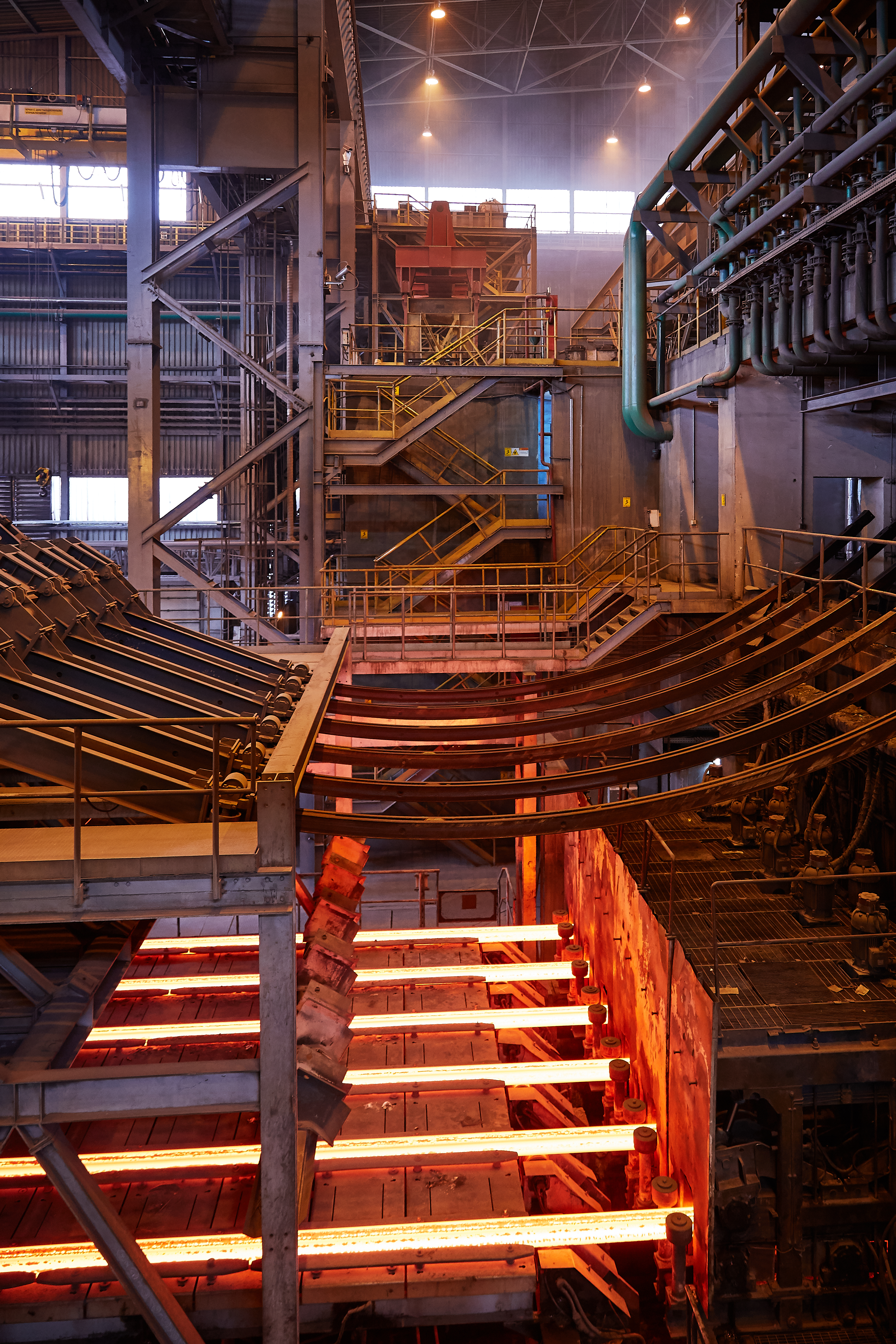
ArcelorMittal Kryvyi Rih

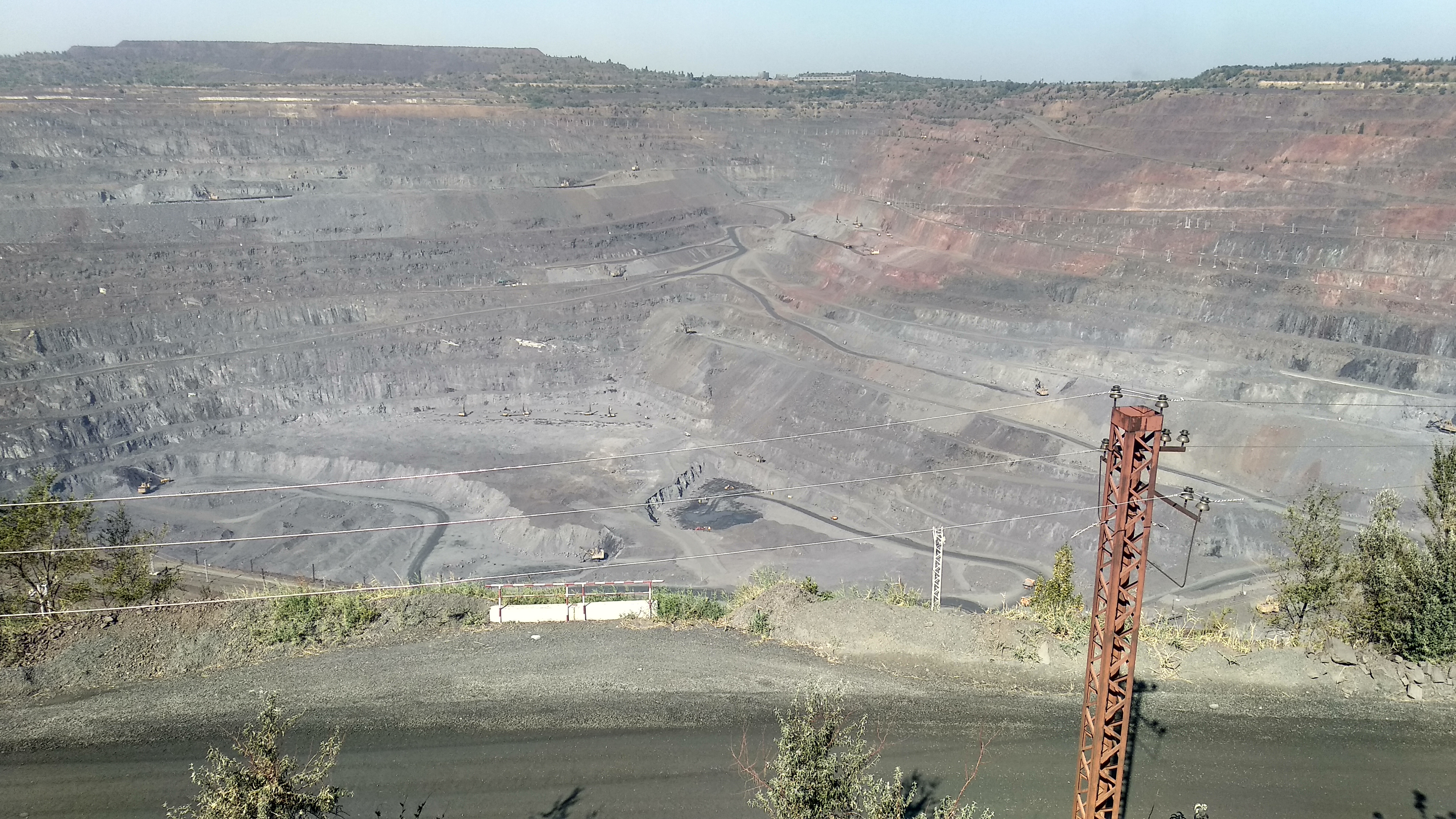
The quarry of Southern Iron Ore Enrichment Works

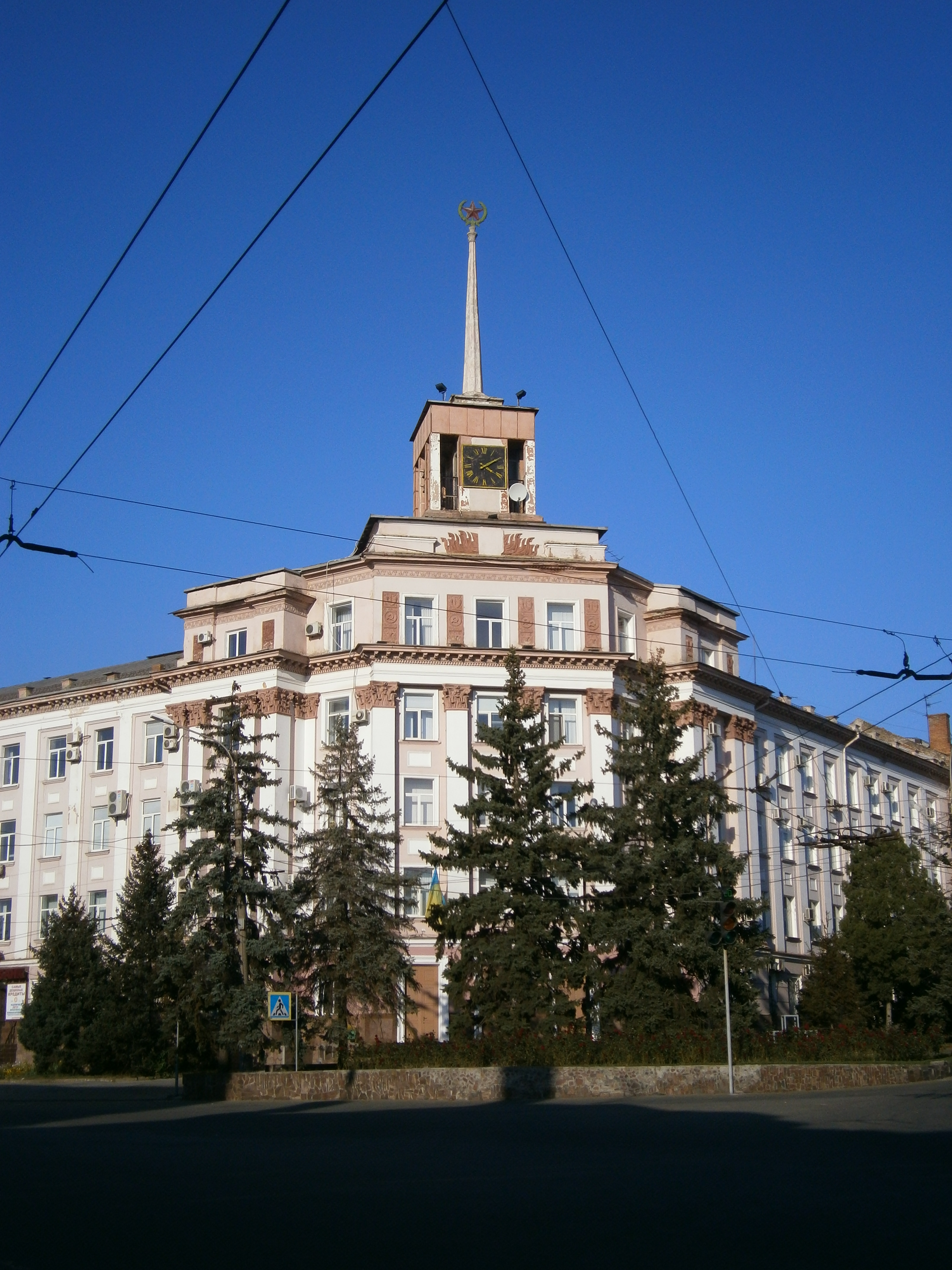
The head office of Kryvyi Rih Iron Ore Complex

- ArcelorMittal Kryvyi Rih (AMKR)
- Central Iron Ore Enrichment Works (CGZK)
- Eastern Mining and Processing Plant (SkhidGZK) in Zhovti Vody
- Inhulets Iron Ore Enrichment Works (InGZK)
- Kryvyi Rih Iron Ore Complex (KZRK)
- Kryvyi Rih Oxidized Ores Mining and Beneficiation Works (KGZKOR) in Dolynska
- New Kryvyi Rih Iron Ore Enrichment Works (NKGZK)
- Northern Iron Ore Enrichment Works (PivnGZK)
- Southern Iron Ore Enrichment Works (PivdGZK)
- Sukha Balka Mine

=== Largest holdings represented ===
- ArcelorMittal
- Development Construction Holding (DCH)
- Metinvest
- Rudomain LLC

== Transport ==
=== Public transport ===
All public transport companies in the Kryvyi Rih are local government or privately owned. The Kryvyi Rih Railway as part of Cisdnieper Railways is integrated into the national Ukrainian Railways system, for both passenger and cargo services.

=== Road transport ===
The motorway network of Kryvyi Rih includes dozens of local roads crossing the region in addition to the motorway, mostly used by through traffic. Other ways have a more regional function. Both have missing links, in various stages of planning. Some missing sections are currently not planned to be constructed.

=== Air transport ===
Kryvyi Rih Airport is the intercontinental airport for region and is within 17 km of the city area.
