= Zhovti Vody urban hromada =

Zhovti Vody urban hromada Жовтоводська міська громада
- Hromada
- Interactive map of Zhovti Vody urban hromada
- Country: Ukraine
- Oblast: Dnipropetrovsk Oblast
- Raion: Kamianske Raion
- Admin. center: Zhovti Vody

Area
  - Total: 78.2 km^{2} (30.2 sq mi)

Population (2020)
  - Total: 45,087
  - Density: 577/km^{2} (1,490/sq mi)
- CATOTTG code: UA12040110000091524
- Settlements: 4
- Cities: 1
- Villages: 3

Zhovti Vody urban territorial hromada (Ukrainian: Жовтоводська міська територіальна громада, romanized: Zhovtovodska miska terytorialna hromada) is one of the hromadas of Ukraine, located in Kamianske Raion within Dnipropetrovsk Oblast. The administrative center is the city of Zhovti Vody.

The area of the territory is 78.2 square kilometres (30.2 mi^{2}), the population of the hromada is 45,087 (2020).

== Composition ==
In addition to one city (Zhovti Vody), the hromada contains 3 villages:

- Marianivka
- Sukha Balka
- Volochaivka

== History ==
Formed in 2020, in accordance with the order of the Cabinet of Ministers of Ukraine No. 709-r dated June 12, 2020 "On the determination of administrative centers and approval of territories of territorial communities of Dnipropetrovsk Oblast", by merging the territories and settlements of Zhovti Vody City Council of Dnipropetrovsk Oblast and Marianivka Village Council of Piatykhatky Raion of Dnipropetrovsk Oblast.
