= Russian Triathlon Federation =

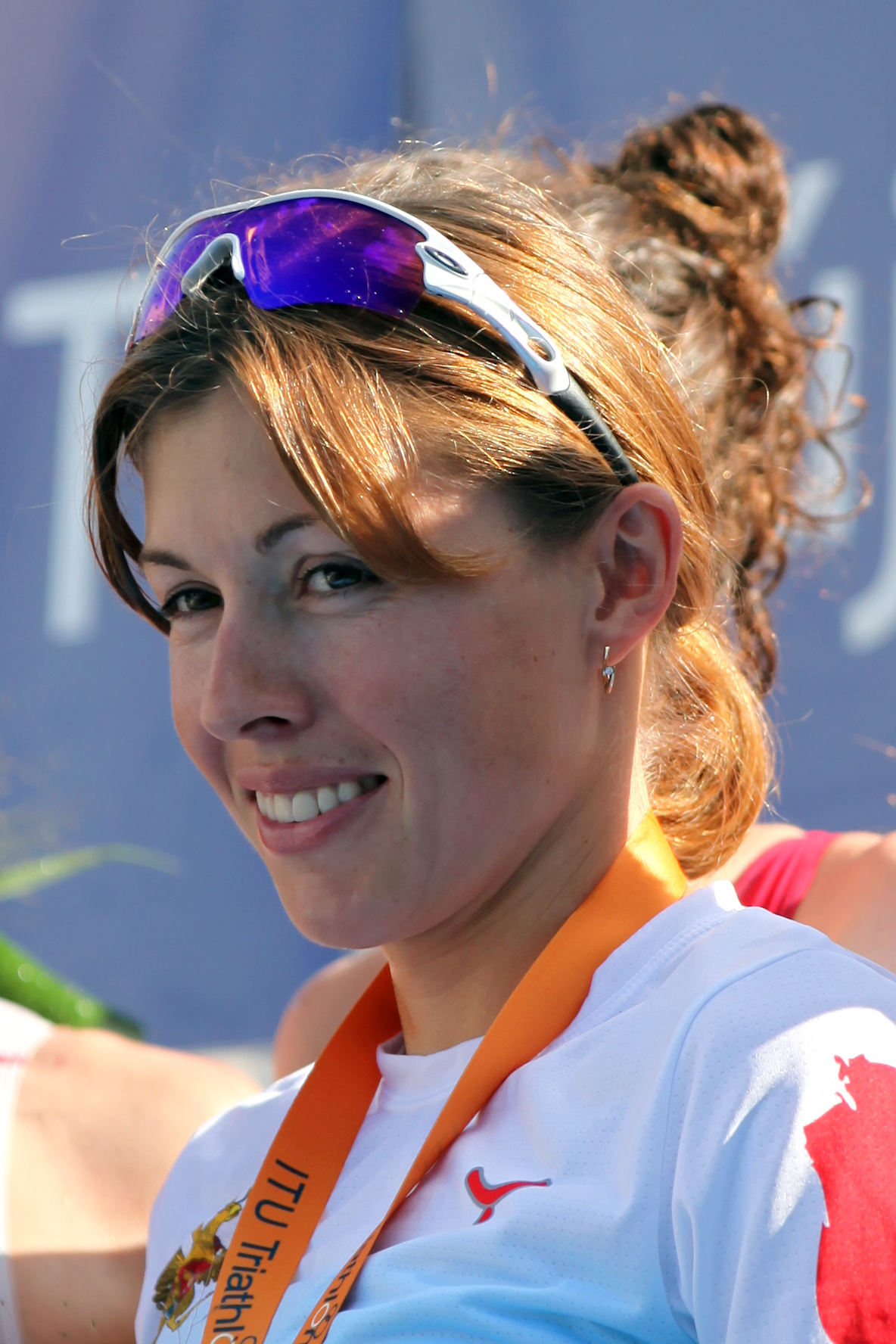
Irina Abysova, still the undisputed female Russian top triathlete.

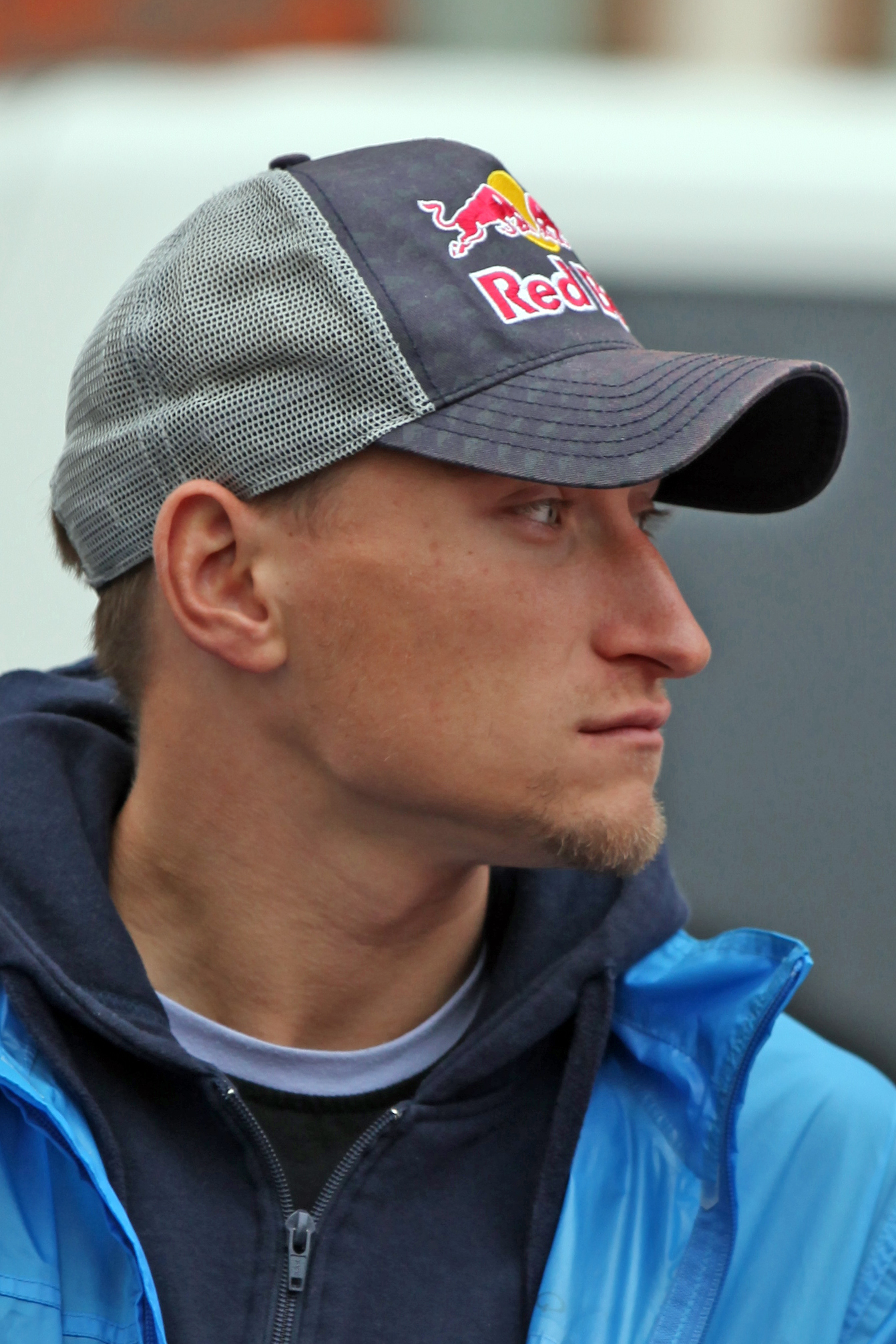
Alexander Bryukhankov, one of the leading male Russian triathletes.

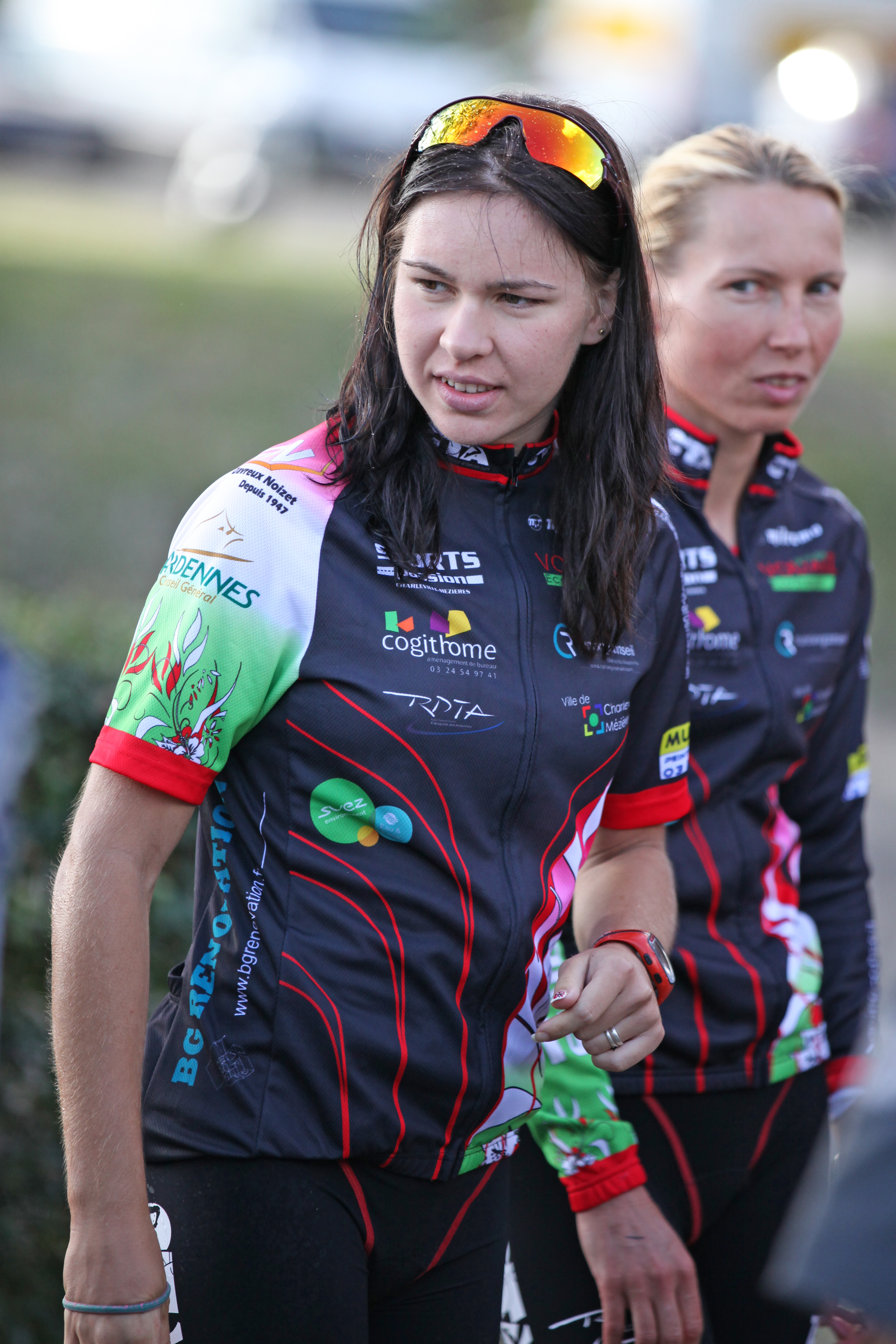
Alexandra Razarenova, Russian Champion of the year 2011.

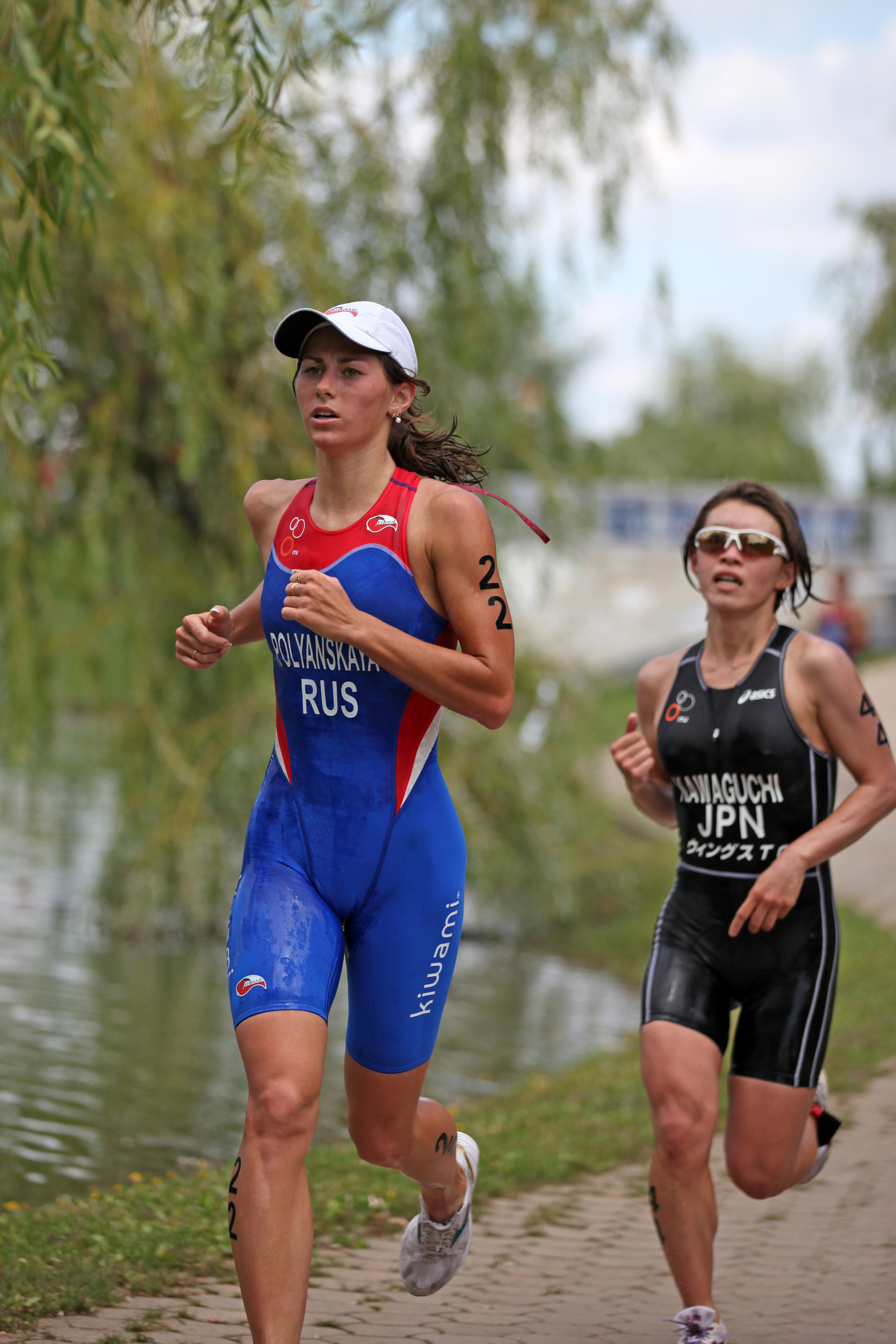
Anastasiya Polyanskaya at the World Cup triathlon in Tiszaújáros, 2011.

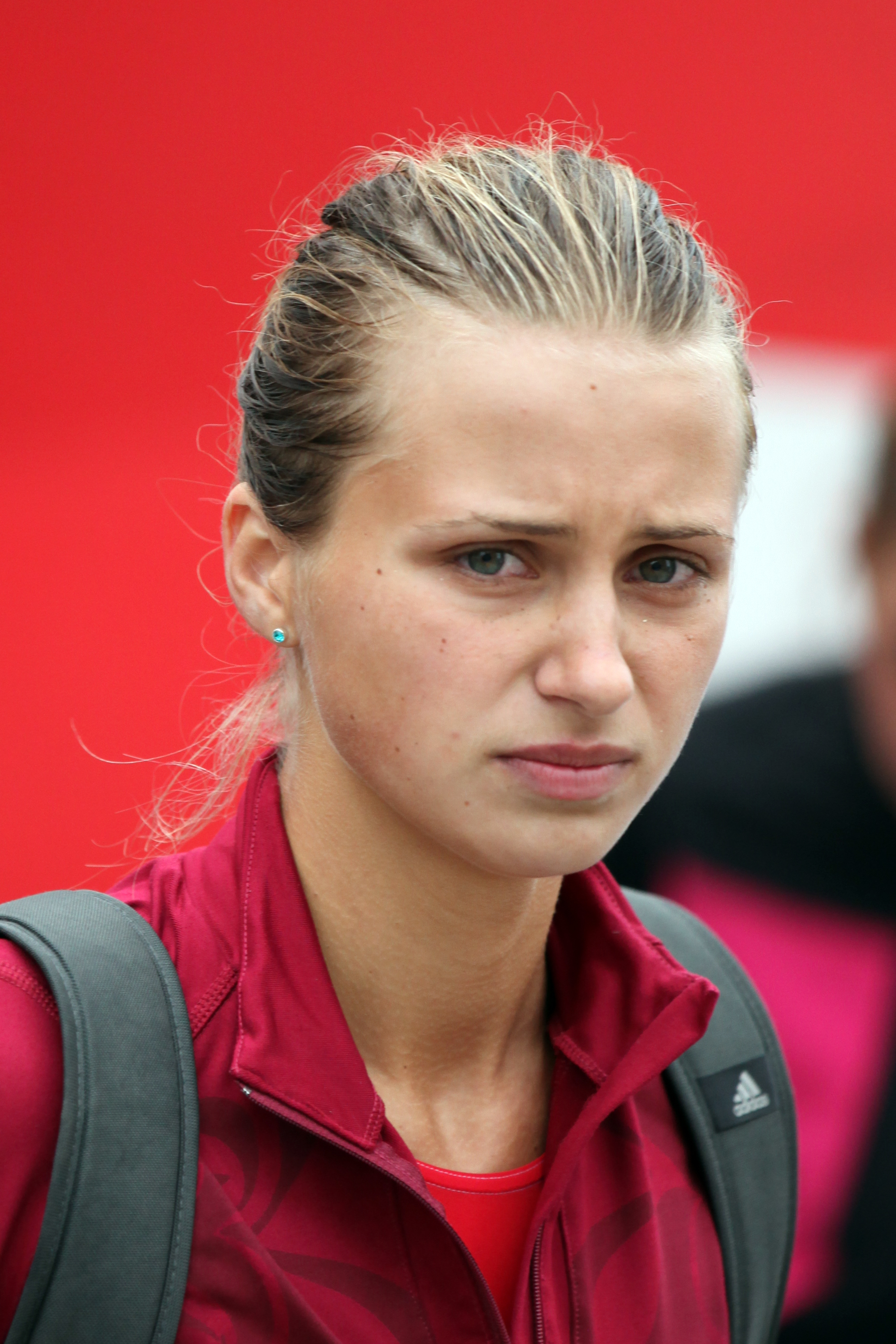
Anastasia Protasenya, one of the promising young Russian triathletes.

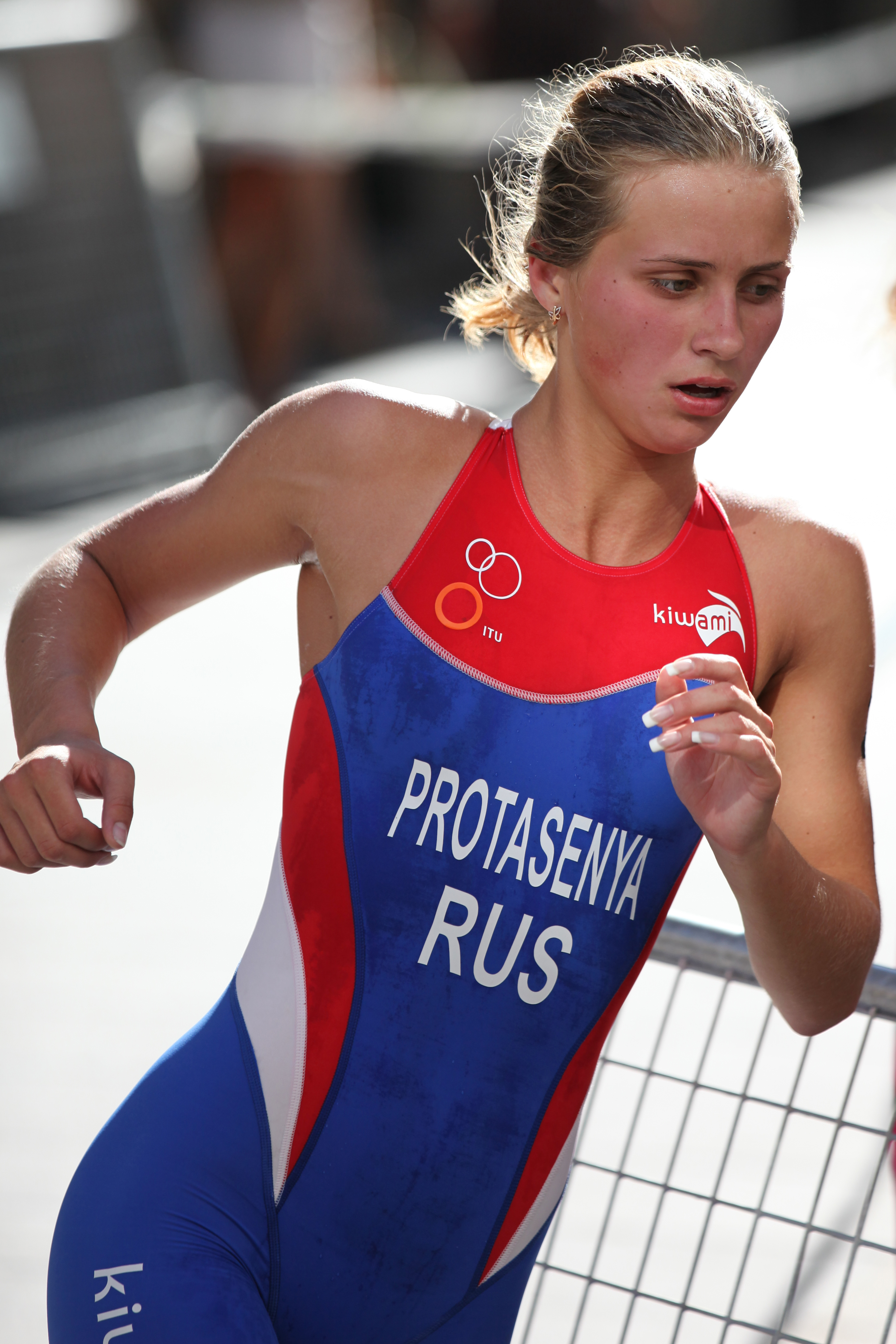
Anastasia Protasenya at the European Championships in Pontevedra, 2011.

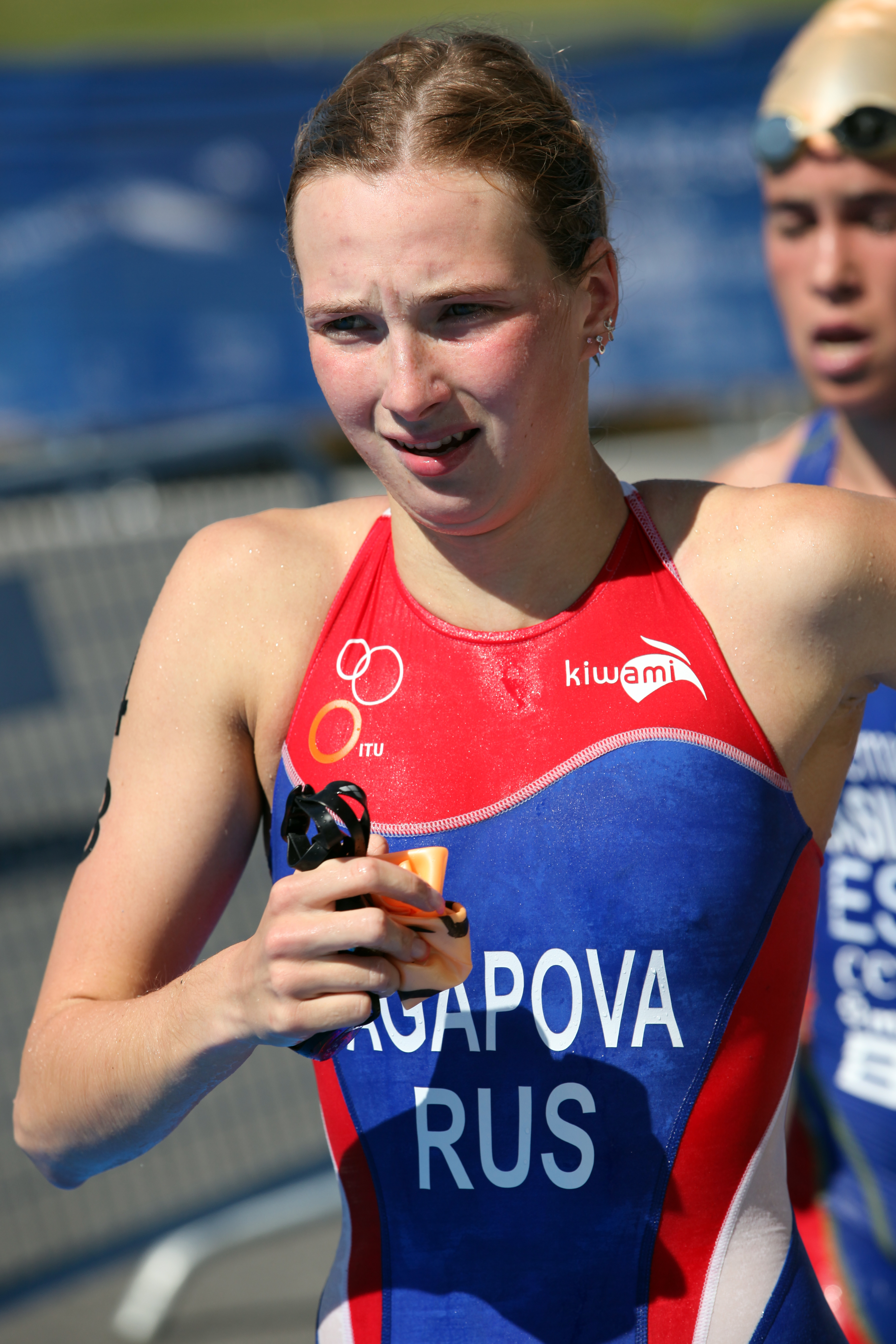
Olga Agapova, one of the most promising Russian U23 triathletes.

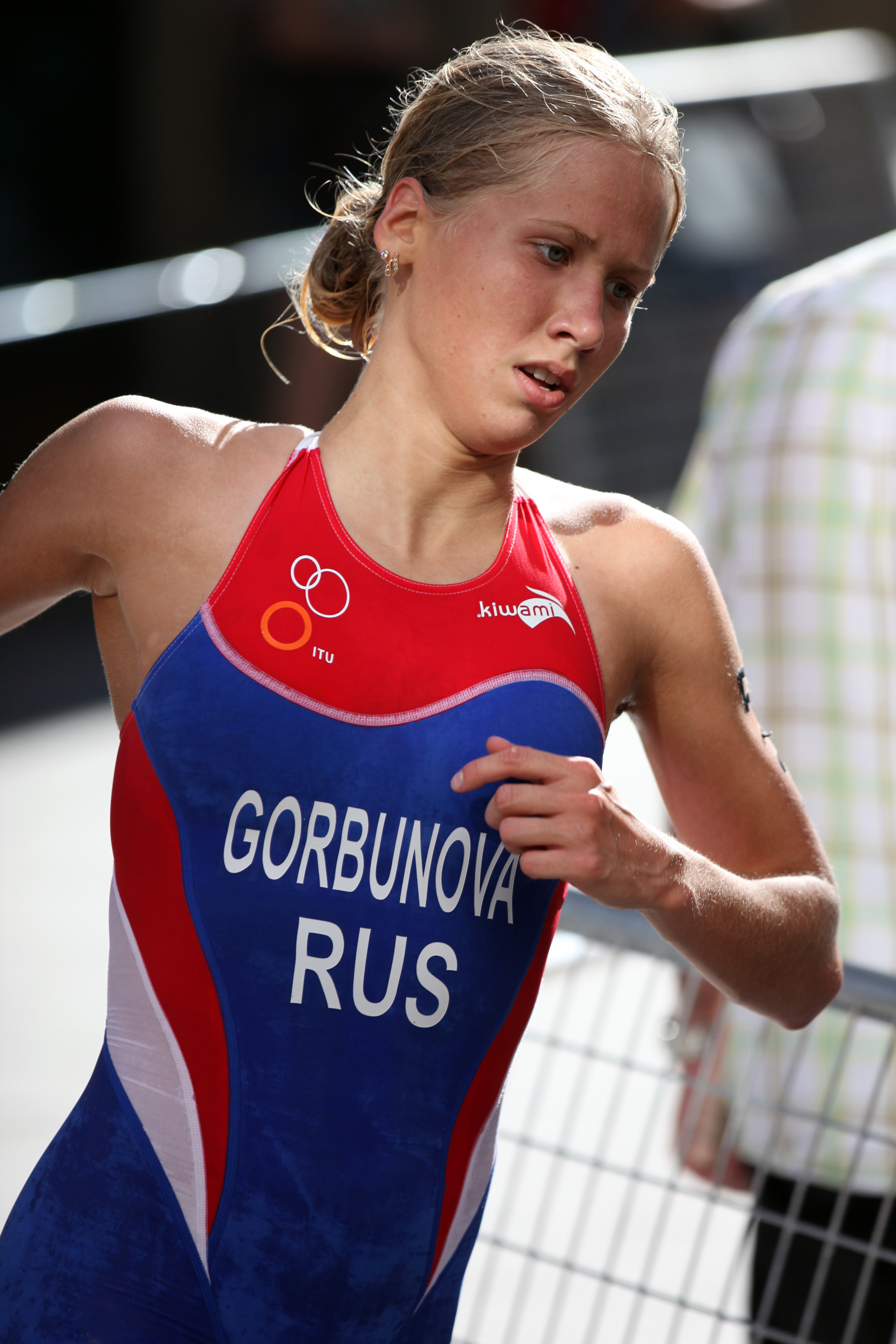
Anastasiya Gorbunova, one of the most promising Russian Junior triathletes.

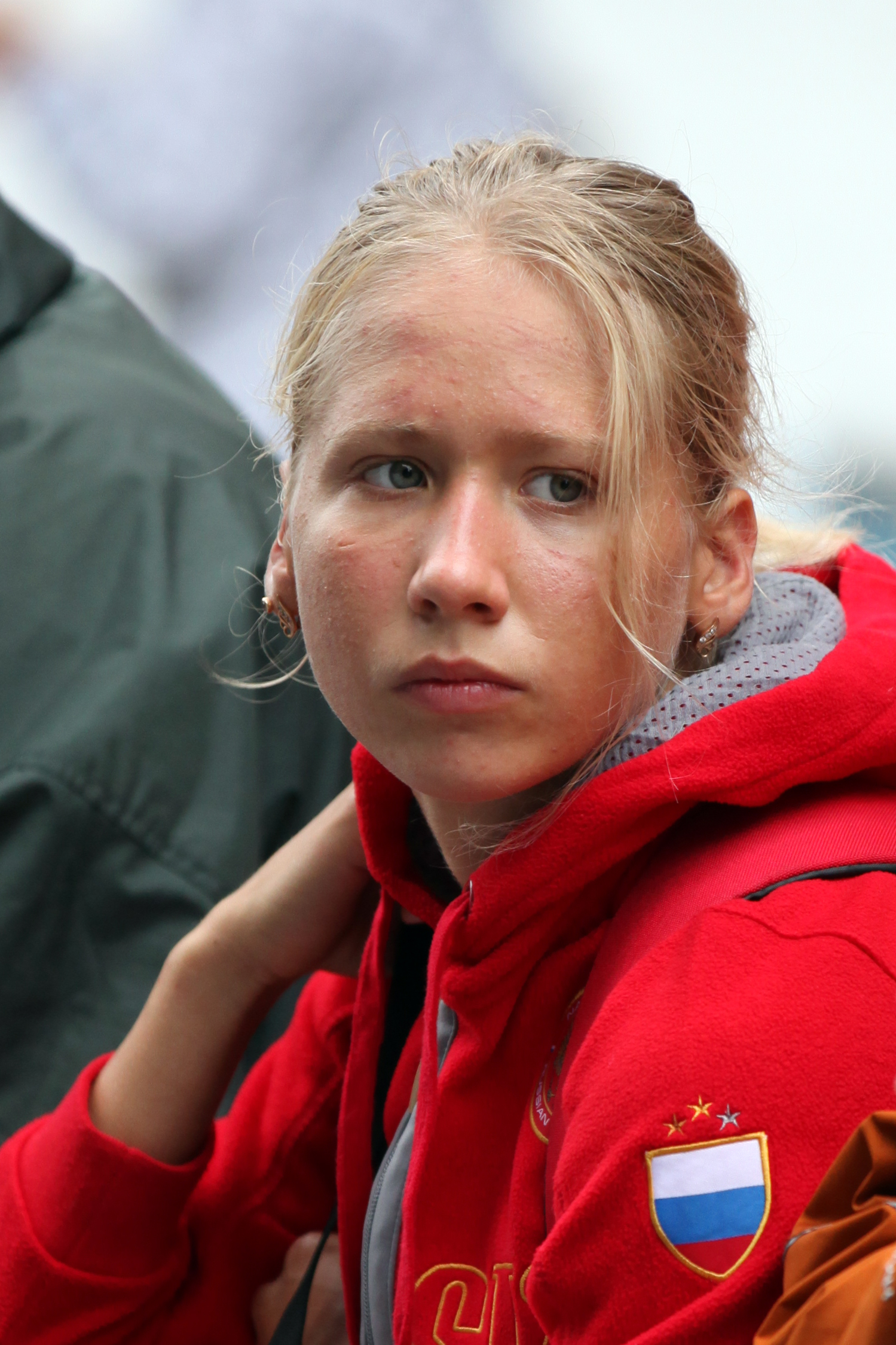
Anastasiya Gorbunova at the mysterious European Cup in Tabor, 2011.

The Russian Triathlon Federation (Russian: Федерация триатлона России, romanized: Federatsiya triatlona Rossii) is the official national governing body for the sports of triathlon, duathlon and winter triathlon and represents Russia in the ITU.

== Structure ==
The president of the RTF from 2010 to 2016 was Sergey Bystrov, born 13 April 1957 in Tver Oblast. In 2000, Bystrov was the vice coordinator of Putin's election campaign in Tver Oblast, from 2001 to 2004 he was Vice Minister of Labour and Social Development, from 2004 on he has worked in various functions in the Ministry of Transport and has been in charge of the infrastructure and logistics department for the Olympic Games in Sochi. He was replaced between December 2016 and 2020 by Pyotr Ivanov, and he in turn by Kseniya Shoygu, daughter of Russian defense minister Sergey Shoygu, in 2020.

After the 2022 Russian invasion of Ukraine, World Triathlon suspended Russian and Belarusian athletes and officials in its international competitions and official events. Europe Triathlon said that it strongly supported the decision of the International Olympic Committee and World Triathlon to exclude Russian and Belarusian athletes and officials from European sporting events, and to not organise international events in Russia or Belarus.

== National Team 2011 ==
- Elite Male: Alexander Bryukhankov, Ivan Vasiliev, Yulian Malyshev, Valentin Meshcheryakov, Artem (Artyom) Parienko, Vyacheslav Pimenov, Dmitry Polyanski, Vladimir Turbayevskiy, Ivan Tutukin; reserve: Andrey Bryukhankov, Denis Vasiliev, Ivan Kalashnikov, Anton Kozlov, Andrey Lyackiy, Igor Polyanskiy, Anatoliy Fedotov, Dmitriy Esaulov.
- Elite Female: Irina Abysova, Anna Burova, Elena Danilova, Olga Dmitrieva, Lyubov Ivanovskaya, Anastasiya Polyanskaya, Alexandra Razarenova; reserve: Yevgeniya Sukhoruchenkova, Svetlana Ushakova, Natalia Shliakhtenko, Mariya Shorets, Arina Shulgina.
- U23 Male (Юниоры): Pavel Agapov, Georgiy Kaurov, Vladimir Kostelcev, Maxim Nikiforov, Denis Seliverstov, Dmitry Khabibullin, Daniil Khvatov, Alexey Khmelevskiy
- U23 Female (Юниорки): Olga Agapova, Alena (Alyona) Adanichkina, Anastasiya Vasilieva, Zoya Kacheyeva, Anastasia Protasenya, Anastasiya Uvarova,
- Junior Male (Юноши): Egor Astakhov, Dmitriy Baruzdin, Ilya Vidineyev, Dmitriy Litvyakov, Mikhail Neznamov, Ilya Prasolov, Alexander Shcherbinin, Svyatoslav Yurgel;
- Junior Female (Девушки): Anastasiya Gorbunova, Evgeniya Zalogina, Mariya Molyarova, Alena (Alyona) Polukhanova, Ekaterina Rodkina, Anastasiya Shakhmatova;

== World Championships (Elite) ==
In the year before the Olympic Games in London 2012, two male triathletes and one female triathlete have emerged as the greatest Olympic hopes: Alexander Bryukhankov, Dmitry Polyanski, and Irina Abysova:

Year	Russian Male Triathletes	Russian Female Triathletes
World Championship Series 2011	Alexander Bryukhankov (5th)	Irina Abysova (47th)
World Championship Series 2011	Dmitry Polyanski (8th)	Alexandra Razarenova (62nd)
World Championship Series 2011	Artem Parienko (30th)	Mariya Shorets (66th)
World Championship Series 2011	Ivan Vasiliev (31st)	Anna Burova (84th)
World Championship Series 2011	Ivan Tutukin (32nd)	Anastasiya Polyanskaya (93rd)
World Championship Series 2011	Valentin Meshcheryakov (46th)	Lyubov Ivanovskaya (107th)
World Championship Series 2011	Igor Polyansky (49th)	Inna Tsyganok (117th)
World Championship Series 2011	Vladimir Turbaevsky (52nd)	
World Championship Series 2011	Yulian Malyshev (97th)	
World Championship Series 2011	Andrey Bryukhankov (133rd)	
World Championship Series 2010	Alexander Bryukhankov (8th)	Irina Abysova (52nd)
World Championship Series 2010	Dmitry Polyanski (14th)	Alexandra Razarenova (56th)
World Championship Series 2010	Valentin Meshcheryakov (17th)	Anastasiya Polyanskaya (64th)
World Championship Series 2010	Vladimir Turbayevskiy (20th)	Olga Dmitrieva (88th)
World Championship Series 2010	Yulian Malyshev (30th)	Yevgeniya Sukhoruchenkova (102nd)
World Championship Series 2010	Ivan Tutukin (36th)	
World Championship Series 2010	Ivan Vasiliev (45th)	
World Championship Series 2010	Anton Chuchko (84th)	
World Championship Series 2010	Igor Sysoev (104th)	
World Championship Series 2010	Igor Polyanskiy (131st)	
World Championship Series 2009	Dmitry Polyanski (9th)	Irina Abysova (30th)
World Championship Series 2009	Alexander Bryukhankov (11th)	Olga Dmitrieva (63rd)
World Championship Series 2009	Yulian Malyshev (15th)	Anastasiya Polyanskaya (102nd)
World Championship Series 2009	Ivan Vasiliev (19th)	
World Championship Series 2009	Vladimir Turbaevsky (33rd)	
World Championship Series 2009	Ivan Tutukin (38th)	
World Championship Series 2009	Ivan Vasiliev (50th)	
World Championship Series 2009	Artem Parienko (88th)	
World Championship Series 2009	Igor Sysoyev (92nd)	
BG World Championships Vancouver 2008	Igor Sysoyev (7th)	Olga Zausaylova (23rd)
BG World Championships Vancouver 2008	Ivan Vasiliev (10th)	Irina Abysova (26th)
BG World Championships Vancouver 2008	Dmitry Polyanski (11th)	
BG World Championships Vancouver 2008	Yulian Malyshev (36th)	
BG World Championships Hamburg 2007	Igor Sysoyev (17th)	Irina Abysova (32nd)
BG World Championships Hamburg 2007	Vladimir Turbaevsky (63rd)	Evgeniya Matveeva (46th)
BG World Championships Hamburg 2007	Dmitry Polyanski (DNF)	Olga Zausaylova (57th)
BG World Championships Hamburg 2007		Olga Dmitrieva (60th)
World Championships Lausanne 2006	Igor Sysoyev (24th)	Irina Abysova (32nd)
World Championships Lausanne 2006		Olga Zausaylova (37th)
World Championships Lausanne 2006		Olga Dmitrieva (59th)
World Championships Lausanne 2006		Olga Generalova (DNF)
World Championships Lausanne 2006		Anastasiya Polyanskaya (DNF)
World Championships Gamagori 2005	Igor Sysoyev (31st)	—
World Championships Madeira 2004	Igor Sysoyev (5th)	Olga Generalova (24th)
World Championships Madeira 2004	Ivan Vasiliev (23rd)	Nina Anisimova (31st)
World Championships Queenstown 2003	Ivan Vasiliev (DNF)	—
World Championships Cancun 2002	—	Nina Anisimova (35th)

== Olympic Games ==
Igor Sysoyev took part in two Olympic Games and can be considered Russia's most successful triathlete of the last decade. His wife Irina Abysova has been a top contender as well.

Year	Russian Male Triathletes	Russian Female Triathletes
Olympic Games Beijing 2008	Igor Sysoyev (9th)	Olga Zausaylova (36th)
Olympic Games Beijing 2008	Dmitry Polyanski (22nd)	Irina Abysova (DNF)
Olympic Games Beijing 2008	Alexander Bryukhankov (24th)	
Olympic Games Athens 2004	Igor Sysoyev (15th)	Olga Generalova (31st)
Olympic Games Athens 2004		Nina Anisimova (DNF)
Olympic Games Sydney 2000		Nina Anisimova (12th)

== Trivia ==
The RTF is not only one of the biggest triathlon federations, the RTF also seems to be one of the influential federations, as some incidents suggest:

- Inna Tsyganok, a Ukrainian-born Russian triathlete, was allowed to take part in various ITU competitions «representing ITU» because, when moving to Russia, she obviously did not fulfil the nationality criteria for about half a year and should not have been allowed to participate in any ITU events. The ITU did not answer to questions as to why Tsyganok «represented ITU» without a nationality. She has officially represented Russia since 2011.
- Anastasiya Gorbunova, a clear DNS case at the Junior European Cup triathlon in Tabor (31 July 2011), was eliminated not only in the ITU result list, but also in the ITU start lists immediately after the triathlon in order to prevent her from being cancelled in the start list of the European Youth Championships in Lausanne. According to the Continental Cup rules, a triathlete who withdraws too late must be removed from all start lists for the next 30 days, hence Gorbunova, the best Russian female junior triathlete, should have been banned from the Youth Triathlon European Championships in Lausanne (27 August 2011). Gorbunova was present in full armour at the check in and the line up but did not go to the pontoon when her start number (83) was called. The ITU does not answer to inquiries as to why Gorbunova was eliminated after the race even in the ITU start list.
- Surprisingly, a local Russian Cup triathlon in Penza was upgraded to a European Cup (3 July 2011) and Junior European Cup (2 July 2011) triathlon although the official ETU calendar did not include any ETU competitions in Russia. All international competitors being absent from this local event, the Russian participants could easily gain points in the ETU and ITU rankings.
- National female triathlon team (with Irina Abysova among other athletes) was sponsored for two seasons (2012–13, 2013–14) by Russian businessman and Ironman triathlete Alexey Cheskidov. In 2014, Mr. Cheskidov founded the first series of triathlon and marathon events in Bronnitsy, Moscow Region. The series was called Titan with its logo and concept being highly influenced (or inspired) by non-present in Russia Ironman Triathlon and World Triathlon Corporation.
