= Polyanski =

Polyanski (Russian: Полянский), also transliterated as Polyanskiy or Polyansky, is a Russian surname (the female form being Polyanskaya, Russian: Полянская). People with this surname include:

- Pavel Lebedev-Polianskii (1888–1948), Russian Bolshevik writer
- Dmitry Polyansky (1917–2001), former Deputy Premier of the Soviet Union
- Anatoly Polyansky (1928–1993), Russian architect
- Valery Polyansky (born 1949), a Russian choral and orchestral conductor
- Igor Nikolaevich Polyansky (born 1967), Russian swimmer, living in New Zealand
- Dmitry Polyanski (born 1986), Russian triathlete, husband of Anastasiya Polyanskaya
- Anastasiya Polyanskaya (born 1989), Ukrainian triathlete, wife of Dmitry Polyanski
- Lyubov Polyanskaya (born 1989), Russian triathlete
- Igor Andreyevich Polyanski (born 1990), Russian triathlete, the younger brother of Dmitry Polyanski
- Stepan Polyansky (1913–1943), Soviet officer
- Pyotr Polyansky aka St. Peter of Krutitsy (shot 1936), named head of Russian Orthodox church 1925, 1926 Siberian exile began
