= Igor Polyanski =

Igor Polyanski or Polyansky may refer to:

- Igor Polyansky (born 1967), Russian swimmer from Novosibirsk, now living in New Zealand
- Igor Andreyevich Polyanski (born 1990), Russian triathlete from Moscow
