= Anastasia Protasenya =

Russian triathlete

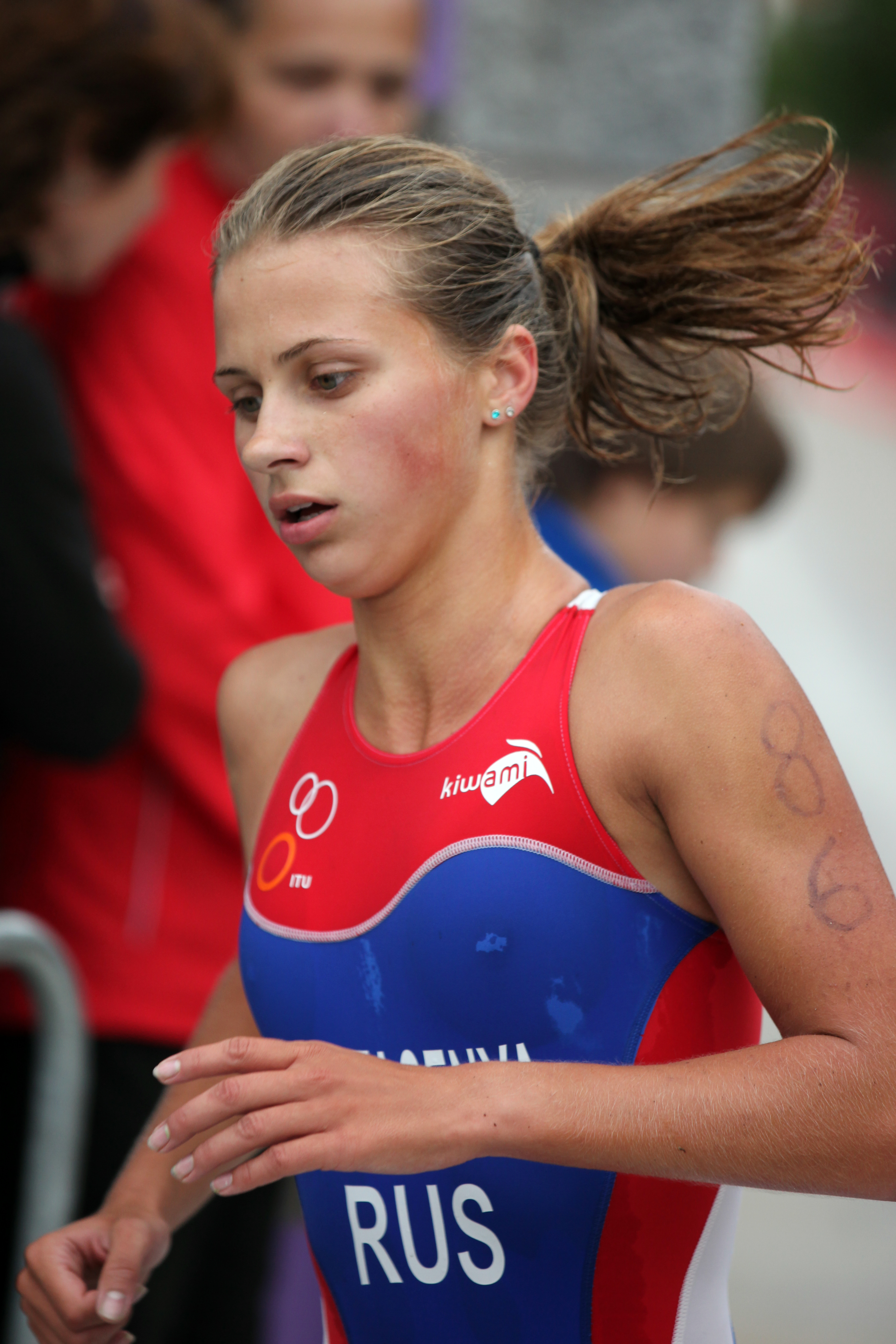
- Anastasia Protasenya after the Junior European Cup triathlon in Tabor, 2011.

Personal information
- Nationality: Russian
- Born: 22 December 1993 (age 31); Moscow

Sport
- Country: Russia
- Sport: Triathlon

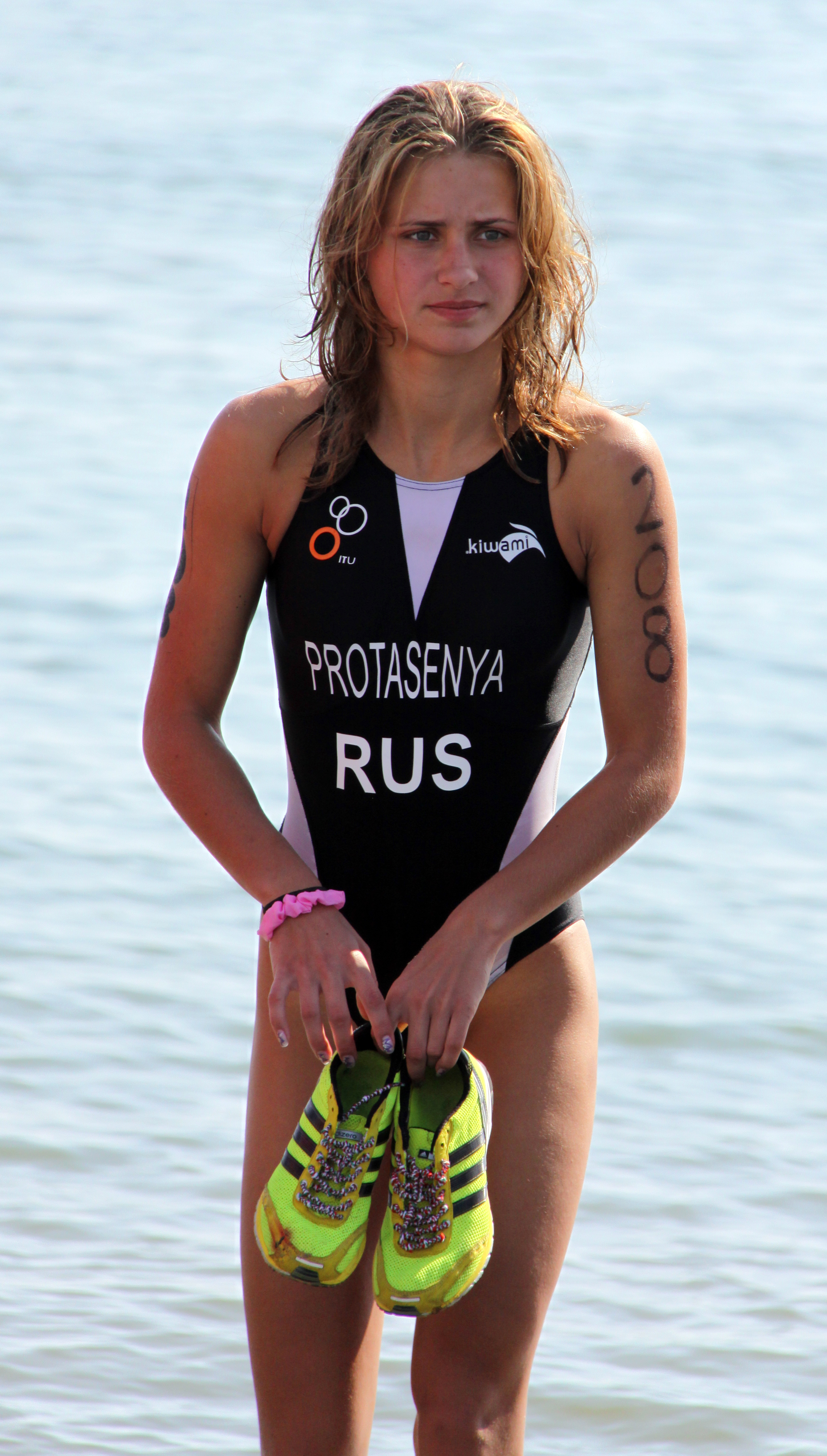
Anastasia Protasenya having won the gold medal at the European Cup in Alanya, 2010.

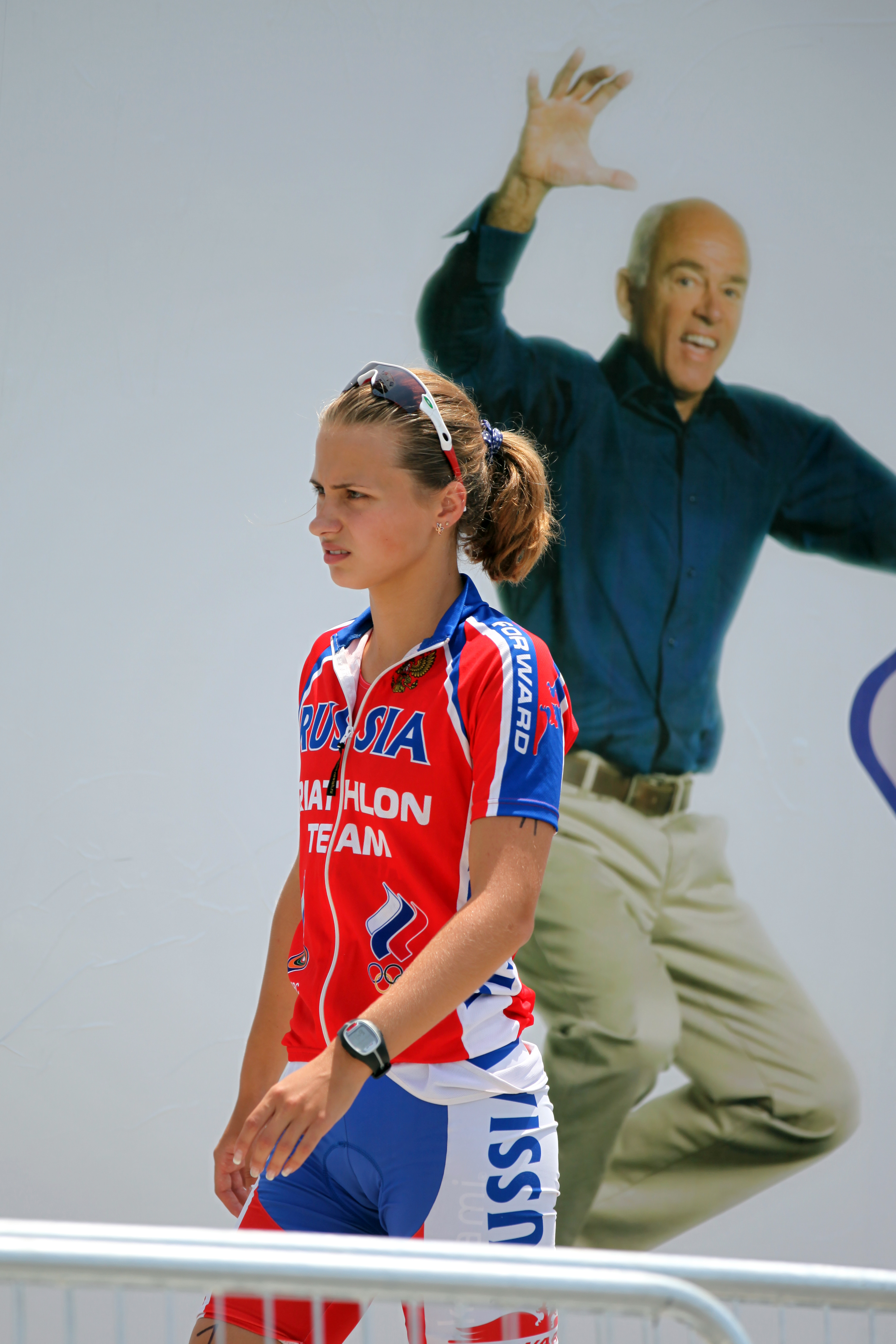
Anastasia Protasenya at the European Championships in Pontevedra, 2011.

Anastasia Protasenya (born 22 December 1993, in Moscow), patronymic Alexandrovna, Russian Анастасия Александровна Протасеня, is a Russian professional triathlete, member of the National Russian Team, National Youth Champion of the year 2010 and number 4 in the Junior category.

In 2009 Anastasia Protasenya competed for the first time in ITU triathlons and won a bronze medal at the European Cup in Tarzo Revine. In 2010, she took part in the Junior Team Relay European Championships and in a Junior European Cup, placing second and first respectively. Thanks to the gold medal she entered the Junior European Rankings / Women Standing at number 31 of 95.

One day after the European Cup triathlon Protasenya took part in the International Alanya Swimming Marathon and won the (elite) bronze medal.

Like Inna Tsyganok and Lyubov Ivanovskaya, Anastasia Protasenya attends an elite sports school for prospective Olympians in Moscow (Московское Среднее Специальное Училище Олимпийского Резерва No. 2) and belongs to the most promising Russian juniors. At the Grand Final of the Russian Cup 2010 in Voronezh she placed first in the Russian Youth category (5 September 2010), in Nizhny Novgorod she had already won the junior silver medal (20 June 2010).

== ITU Competitions ==
In the four years from 2009 to 2012, Protasenya took part in 15 ITU competitions and achieved eight top ten placements. The following list is based upon the official ITU rankings and the athlete's ITU Profile Page.

Date	Competition	Place	Rank
2009-05-23	Duathlon European Championships (Junior)	Budapest	19
2009-06-20	European Cup (Junior)	Tarzo Revine	3
2009-07-02	European Championships (Junior)	Holten	42
2009-09-26	European YOG Qualifier (Youth Women)	Mar Menor	19
2010-08-29	European Championships (Junior Women Team Relay)	Vila Nova de Gaia (Porto)	2
2010-10-24	European Cup (Junior)	Alanya	1
2011-06-11	European Cup (Junior)	Vienna	11
2011-06-24	European Championships (Junior)	Pontevedra	41
2011-06-24	European Championships (Elite Mix Relay)	Pontevedra	9
2011-07-02	European Cup (Junior)	Penza	6
2011-07-31	European Cup (Junior)	Tabor	14
2011-11-02	European Cup (Junior)	Alanya	9
2012-06-30	European Cup(Junior)	Kupiskis	5
2012-08-18	European Cup (Junior)	Penza	1
2012-10-20	World Triathlon: Grand Final	Auckland	25

DNF = did not finish · DNS = did not start
