= Alexey Cheskidov =

Russian businessman

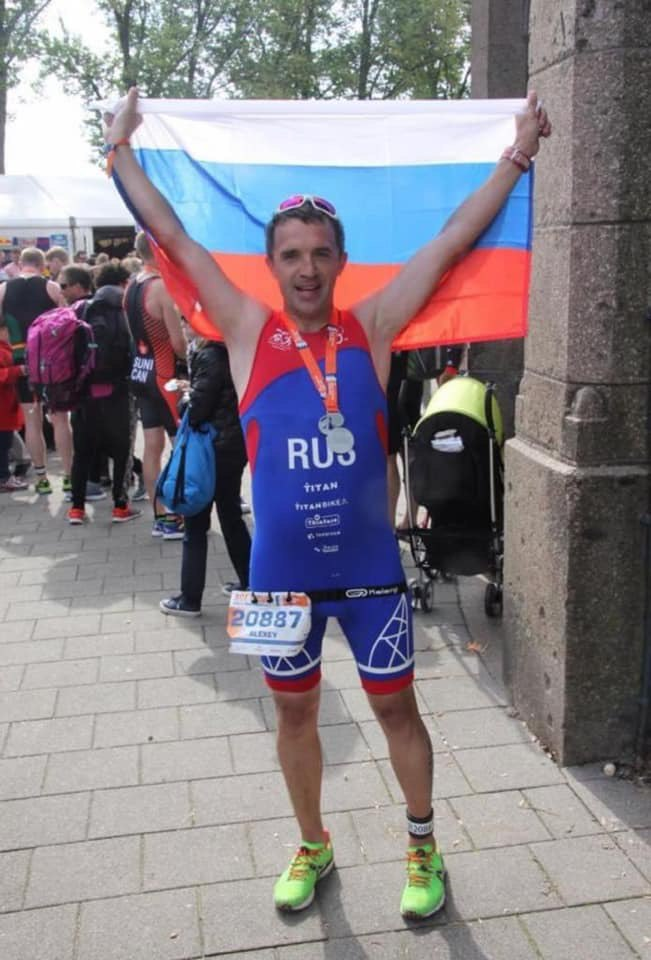
- Born: Alexey Nikolayevich Cheskidov; July 14, 1977 (age 48); Tyumen, USSR
- Occupation: businessman
- Known for: EVEN (hydraulics manufacturer); Titan Series (triathlon events)

Alexey Nikolayevich Cheskidov (Russian: Алексе́й Никола́евич Ческидов, b. July 14, 1977) is a Russian businessman, known as organizer of the series of amateur triathlon and marathon events in Russia (Titan in Bronnitsy, Moscow Region). He is also the president of the Moscow Region Triathlon Federation and the founder of the New Opportunities Charity Foundation.

== Biography ==
Alexey Cheskidov was born in Tyumen, Soviet Union, and educated in the Netherlands, where he lived for eight years. He is also the owner, founder and CEO of EVEN company group (truck hydraulics manufacturer and a manufacturer of trailers and semi-trailers under the TITAN brand) and its subsidiaries Tachograph LLC (Russian: ООО Тахограф - tachographs supplier) and Shaft LLC (Russian: ООО Шафт - truck and bus transmissions supplier).

Alexey Cheskidov has been appointed as vice-president of the Russian Triathlon Federation.

Alexey is a 3-time finisher of the Marathon des Sables Ultramarathon (250 km) in the Sahara. He ran the Ironman fourteen times, a 226 km long "iron" triathlon. He is also the bronze medalist of the Ultramarathon Jungle Marathon (272 km) in the jungles of Brazil. In 2013, he sponsored the Russian women's triathlon team. From 2016 to 2020, Vice-President of the Russian Triathlon Federation.

Alexey Cheskidov was the first to organize the All-Russian Amateur Winter Games in 2018.

He is married and has three children.
