= Olga Dmitrieva =

Russian triathlete (born 1981)

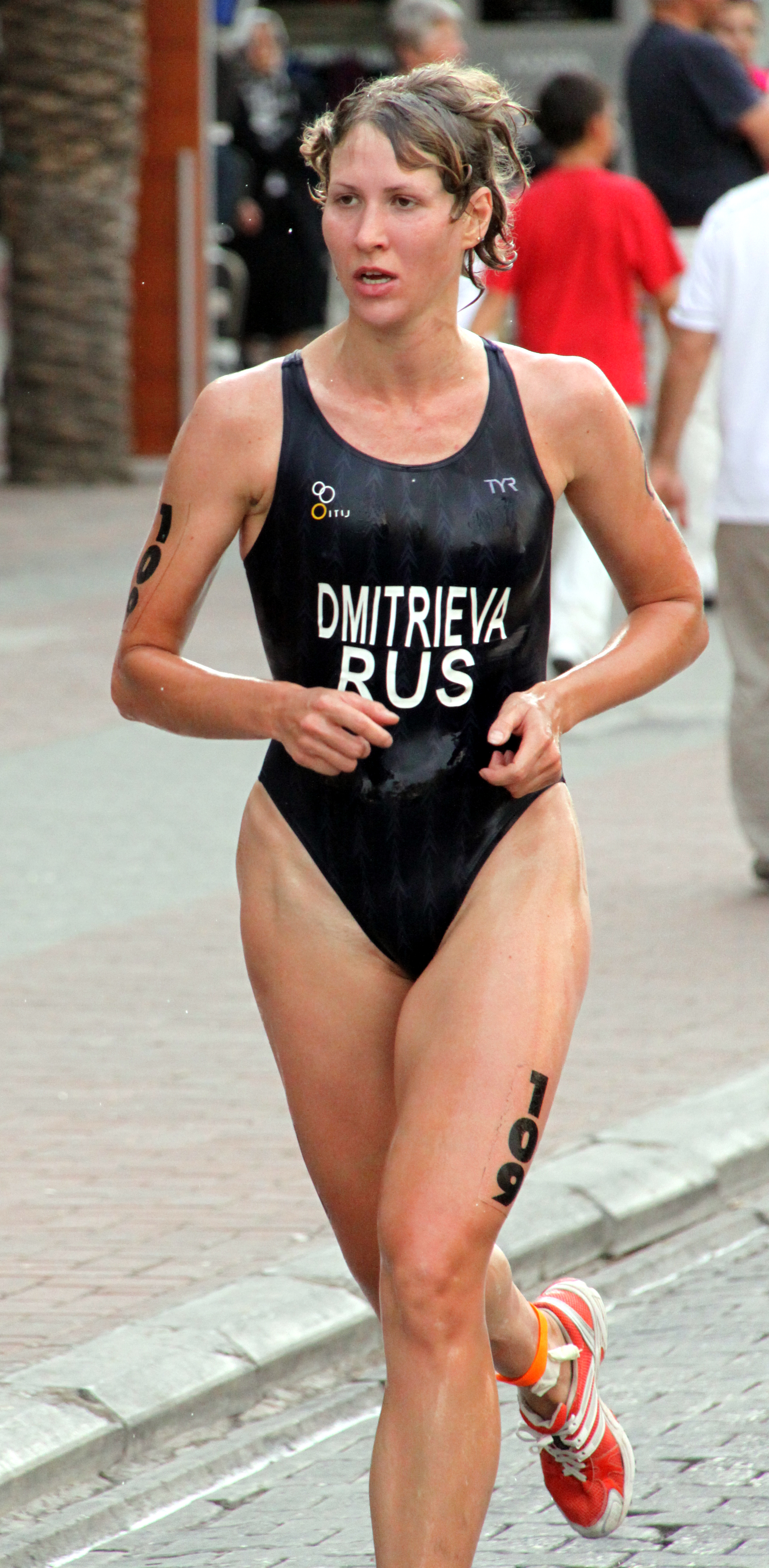
- Dmitrieva at the Premium European Cup in Alanya, 2009.

Personal information
- Full name: Olga Alekseyevna Dmitrieva
- Nationality: Russian
- Born: 26 June 1981 (age 45) Leningrad, Soviet Union

Sport
- Country: Russia
- Sport: Triathlon

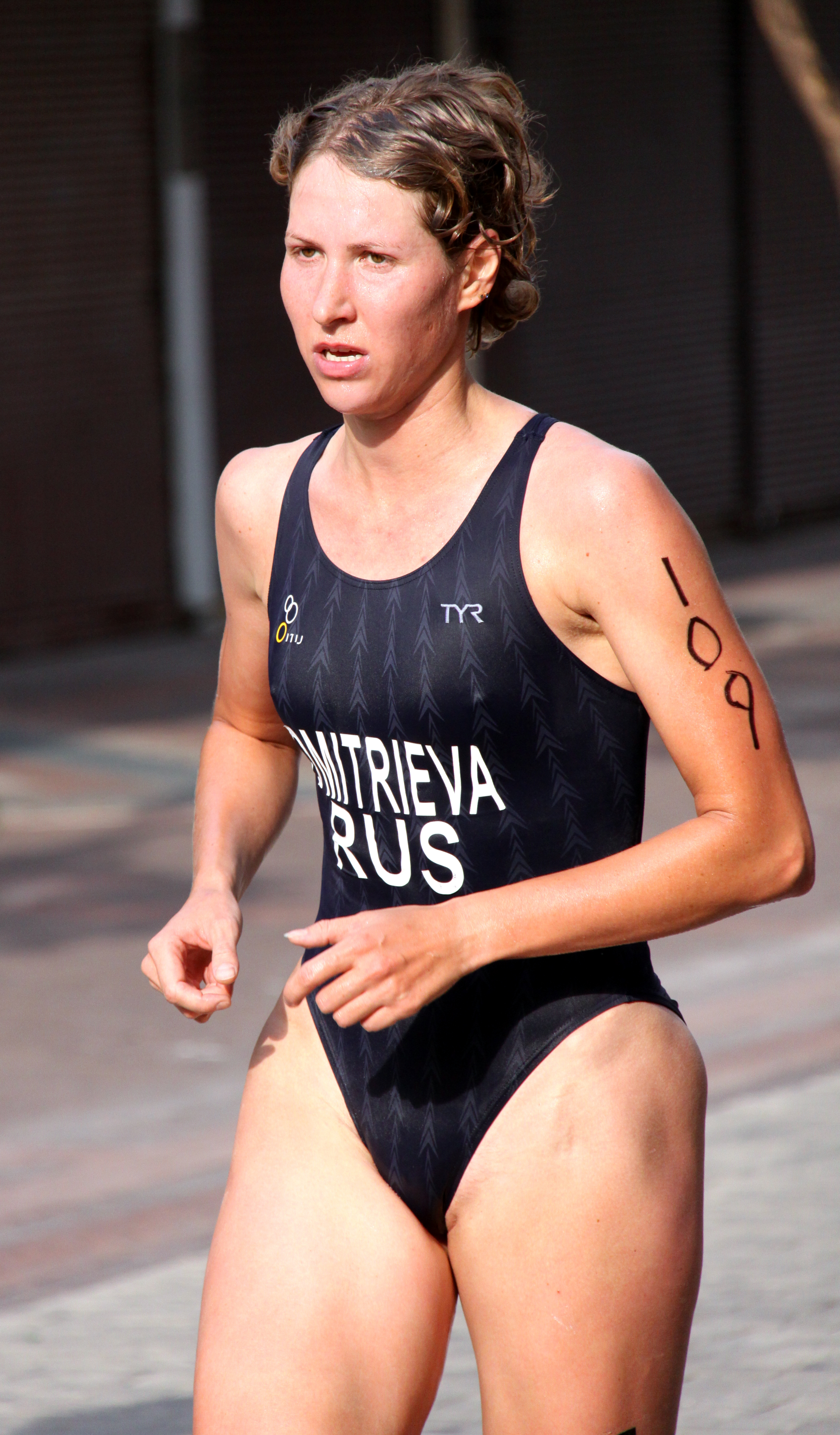
Olga Dmitrieva placing tenth at the Premium European Cup in Alanya, 2009.

Olga Alekseyevna Dmitrieva (Russian: Ольга Алексеевна Дмитриева), born 26 June 1981 in Leningrad (now St. Petersburg), is a Russian professional triathlete and member of the Russian National Team.

== Career ==
In the 2009 Russian Triathlon Federation's ranking, Dmitrieva was the number 1. She also won the Russian Cup in 2009 although she took part in only 3 of the relevant 10 races. At the Russian Championships of the year 2010 she won the supersprint silver medal and she won bronze on the Olympic Distance.

At the World Military Triathlon Championship of the year 2006 in Satenas, Sweden, Dmitrieva won the gold medal with her Russian team and placed 3rd in the individual ranking. At the Military Championship of the year 2008 in Otepää, Estonia, Dmitrieva won the silver medal in the team ranking and placed 4th in the individual ranking.

In 2009, Dmitrieva also took part in the prestigious French Club Championship Series Lyonnaise des Eaux and represented the club Charleville Tri Ardennes. At the triathlon in Longchamp (Paris), for instance, Olga Dmitrieva placed 19th and thus proved to be the club's best elite triathlete, followed by the foreign athletes Danne Boterenbrood (20th) from the Netherlands, Karolien Geerts (32nd) from Belgium, and Alia Cardinale Villalobos (35th) from Costa Rica. At the Grand Final of the Club Championship Series in La Baule Dmitrieva placed 20th and was the second best among the CHARLEVILLE triathletes and this time it was Katrien Verstuyft from Belgium to be the best Charleville triathlete (18th).

== ITU Competitions ==
In the nine years from 2002 to 2010, Dmitrieva took part in 45 ITU competitions and achieved 18 top ten positions. The following list is based upon the official ITU rankings and the Athlete's Profile Page. Unless indicated otherwise the following events are triathlons (Olympic Distance) and belong to the Elite category.

Date	Competition	Place	Rank
2002-10-23	European Cup	Alanya	7
2003-09-20	European Cup	Zagreb	12
2003-10-22	European Cup	Alanya	8
2004-06-20	European Cup	Erdek	1
2004-10-27	European Cup	Alanya	6
2005-10-26	Premium European Cup	Alanya	6
2006-06-04	BG World Cup	Madrid	DNS
2006-06-23	European Championships	Autun	30
2006-07-30	BG World Cup	Salford	40
2006-08-13	BG World Cup	Tiszaújváros	27
2006-09-02	World Championships	Lausanne	59
2006-09-17	Premium European Cup	Kedzierzyn Kozle	6
2006-09-24	BG World Cup	Beijing	43
2006-10-18	Premium European Cup	Alanya	9
2007-05-06	BG World Cup	Lisbon	39
2007-05-20	European Cup and Small States Championships	Limassol	3
2007-06-03	BG World Cup	Madrid	19
2007-06-29	European Championships	Copenhagen	29
2007-07-22	BG World Cup	Kitzbuhel	45
2007-07-29	BG World Cup	Salford	39
2007-08-11	BG World Cup	Tiszaújváros	49
2007-08-30	BG World Championships	Hamburg	60
2007-09-09	Premium European Cup	Kedzierzyn Kozle	15
2007-10-24	Premium European Cup	Alanya	13
2008-04-13	European Cup	Chania	DNS
2008-06-28	9th World University Championship / Triathlon	Erdek	10
2008-09-07	Premium European Cup	Kedzierzyn Kozle	7
2008-10-26	Premium European Cup	Alanya	8
2009-04-05	European Cup	Quarteira	10
2009-04-26	World Cup	Ishigaki	6
2009-05-02	Dextro Energy World Championship Series	Tongyeong	30
2009-05-17	Premium European Cup	Pontevedra	3
2009-05-31	Dextro Energy World Championship Series	Madrid	34
2009-07-02	European Championships	Holten	20
2009-07-25	Dextro Energy World Championship Series	Hamburg	DNF
2009-08-09	World Cup	Tiszaújváros	39
2009-10-25	Premium European Cup	Alanya	10
2009-11-21	Premium European Cup	Eilat	6
2010-04-11	European Cup	Quarteira	DSQ
2010-04-18	European Cup	Antalya	1
2010-06-05	Dextro Energy World Championship Series	Madrid	42
2010-07-03	European Championships	Athlone	25
2010-07-10	World Cup	Holten	35
2010-08-08	World Cup	Tiszaújváros	13
2010-08-14	Dextro Energy World Championship Series	Kitzbuhel	37
2010-08-22	European Cup	Karlovy Vary (Carlsbad)	3
2010-10-24	Premium European Cup	Alanya	DNF

BG = the sponsor British Gas · DNF = did not finish · DNS = did not start · DSQ = disqualified
