= Igor Andreyevich Polyanski =

Russian triathlete

Igor Polyanski
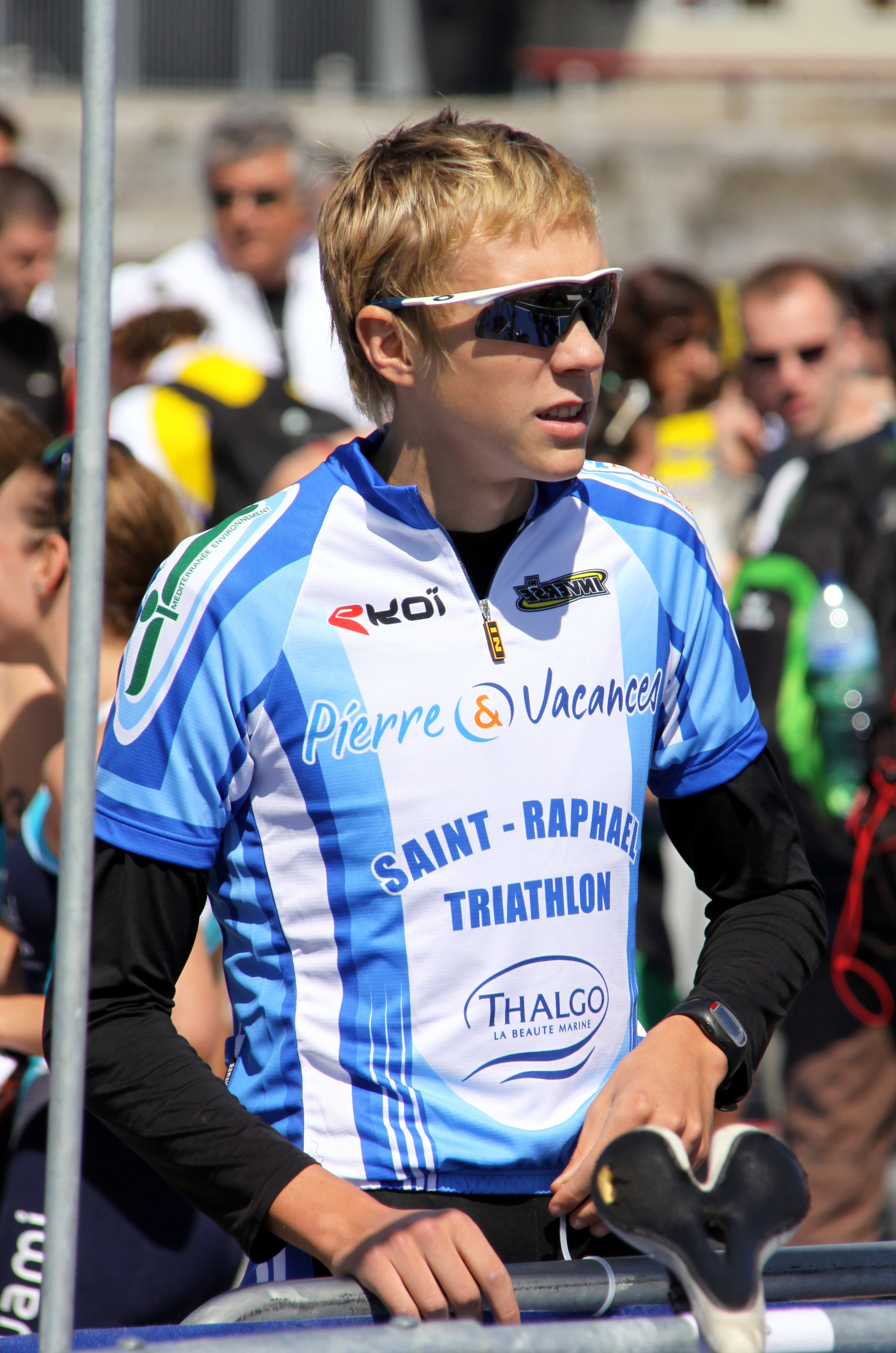
- Igor Polyanski at the Triathlon de Dunkerque, 2010

Personal information
- Full name: Igor Andreyevich Polyanski
- National team: Russia
- Born: November 19, 1986 (age 39)

Igor Andreyevich Polyanski (Russian: Игорь Андреевич Полянский, also transliterated as Polyanskiy or Polyansky), born 16 January 1990 in Zhelesnogorsk), is a former Russian professional triathlete. He was Russian Sprint Champion 2010 and a member of the Russian national team.

== Career ==
Polyanski placed 13th (junior category) in the Russian Cup of the year 2009, and 6th at the Junior World Championships. In 2010, Igor Polyanski won the U23 supersprint at the Russian Championships in Penza and the U23 bronze medal on the Olympic Distance.

In 2010, Igor Polyanski also took part in the prestigious French Club Championship Series Lyonnaise des Eaux representing the club Saint-Raphaël Tri. At the first competition of this circuit in Dunkirk (23 May 2010), Polyanski placed 49th. Incidentally, none of the five athletes representing Saint-Raphaël Tri was French: Dmitry Polyanski, Karl Shaw, Olivier Marceau, Kristian Mac Cartney, and Igor Polyanski. At the Triathlon de Paris (18 July 2010), Igor Polyanski placed 9th and at the Grand Final in La Baule (Triathlon Audencia, 18 September 2010) he placed 41st.

Igor Polyanski is the younger brother of the professional triathlete Dmitry Polyanski, the husband of the Ukrainian Russian triathlete Anastasiya Polyanskaya. According to media reports, Igor and Lyubov Ivanovskaya are a couple. All four of them will represent Saint Raphaël Triathlon in the Club Championship in 2010.

In October 2021 Polyanski was issued with a three-year ban backdated to August 2021 for an anti-doping rule-violation having tested positive for EPO. His result at the men's triathlon at the Tokyo 2020 Olympic Games was disqualified.

== ITU Competitions ==
In the five years from 2006 to 2010, Igor Polyanski took part in 16 ITU competitions and achieved 8 top ten positions. The following list is based upon the official ITU rankings and the Athlete's Profile Page. Unless indicated otherwise, the following events are triathlons (Olympic Distance) and belong to the Elite category.

Date	Competition	Place	Rank
2008-10-26	European Cup (Junior)	Alanya	4
2010-06-27	Premium Asian Cup	Burabay	3
2011-02-26	Pan American Cup and South American Championships	Salinas	5

BG = the sponsor British Gas · DNF = did not finish · DNS = did not start · DQ = disqualified
