= Yevgeniya Sukhoruchenkova =

Russian triathlete

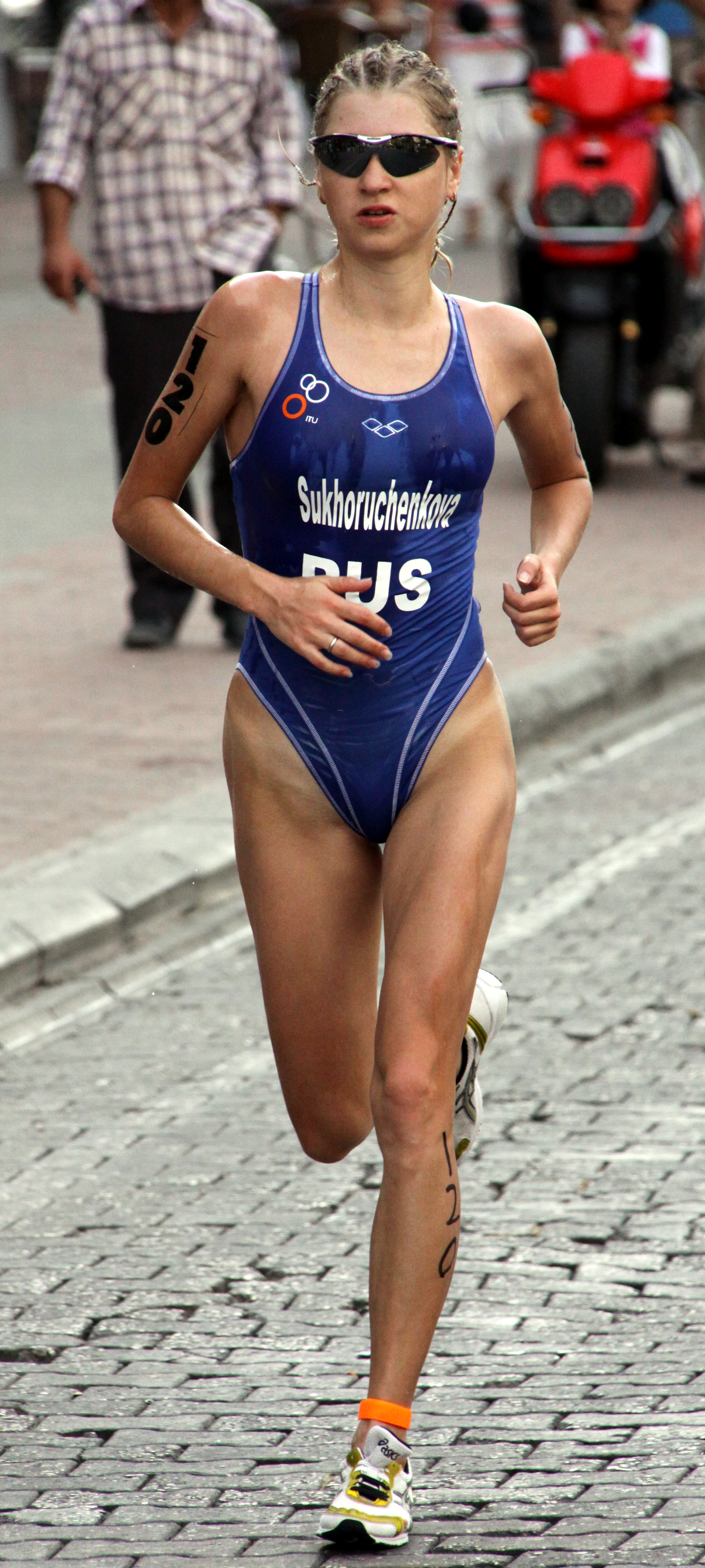
- Yevgeniya Sukhoruchenkova at the Triathlon Premium European Cup in Alanya, 2009.

Personal information
- Full name: Yevgeniya Vyacheslavovna Koshelnikova Sukhoruchenkova
- Nationality: Russian
- Born: 25 September 1986 (age 39) Stavropol

Sport
- Country: Russia
- Sport: Triathlon

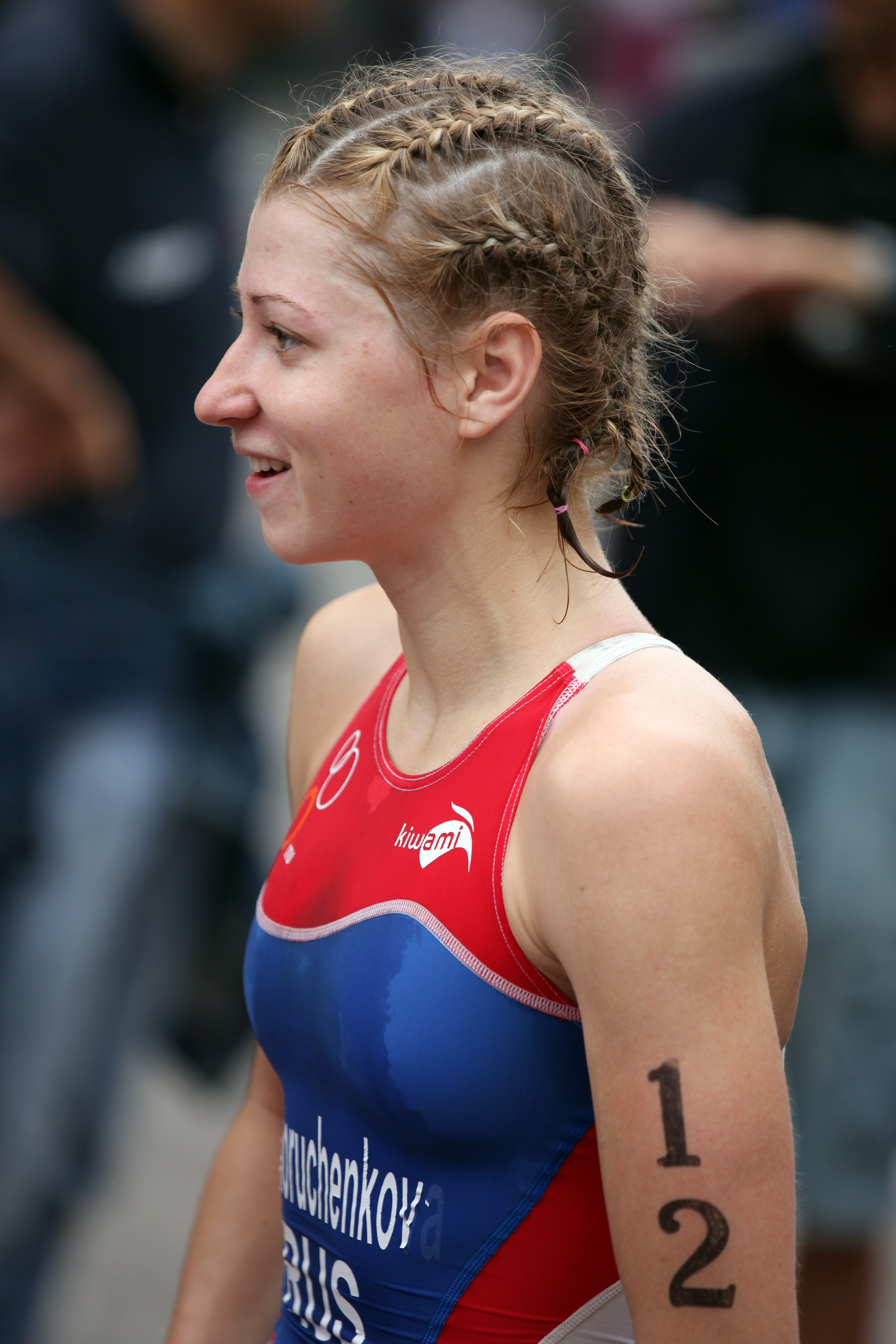
Sukhoruchenkova after the Sprint European Cup in Cremona, 2012.

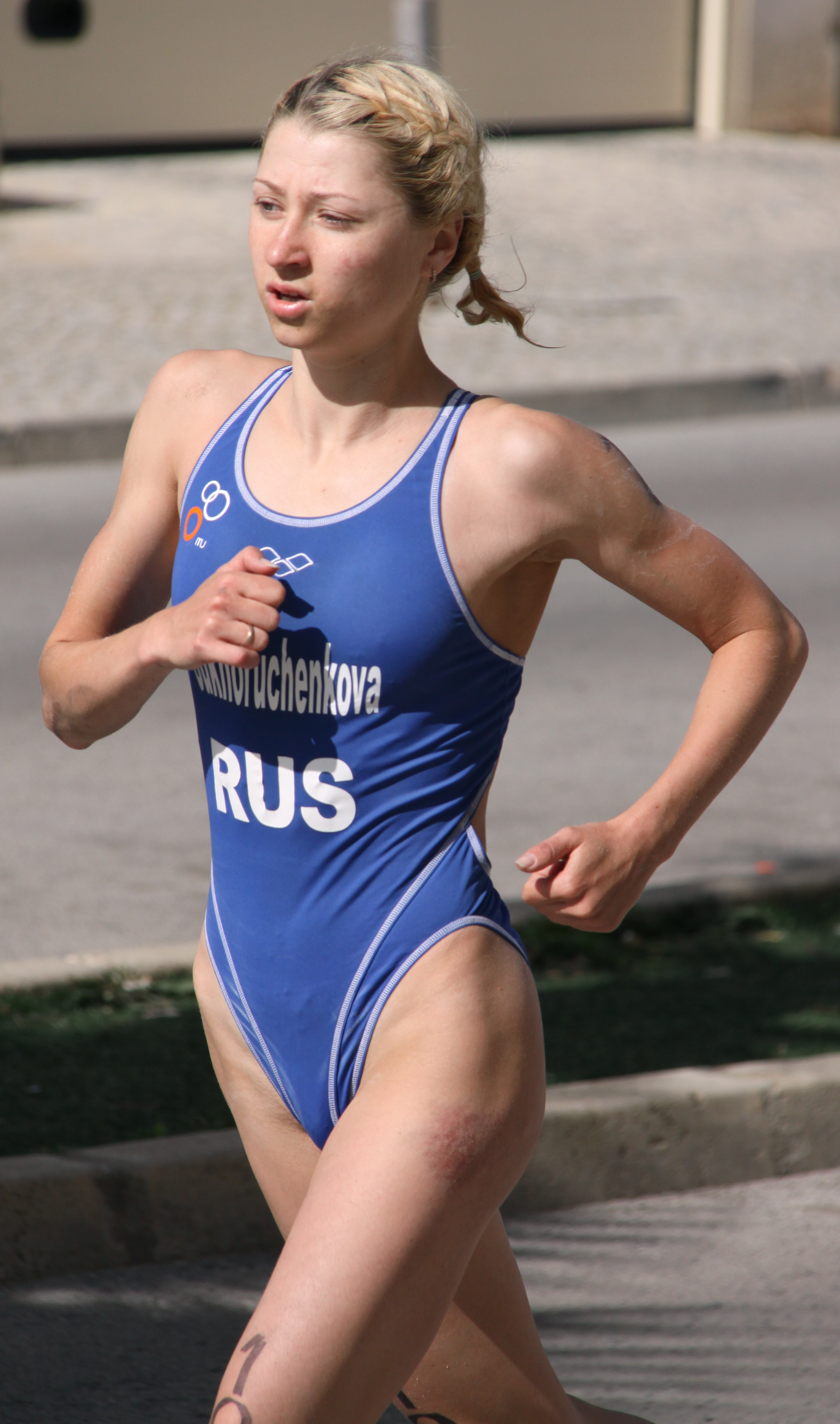
Yevgeniya Sukhoruchenkova after her bike accident at the European Cup in Quarteira, 2010.

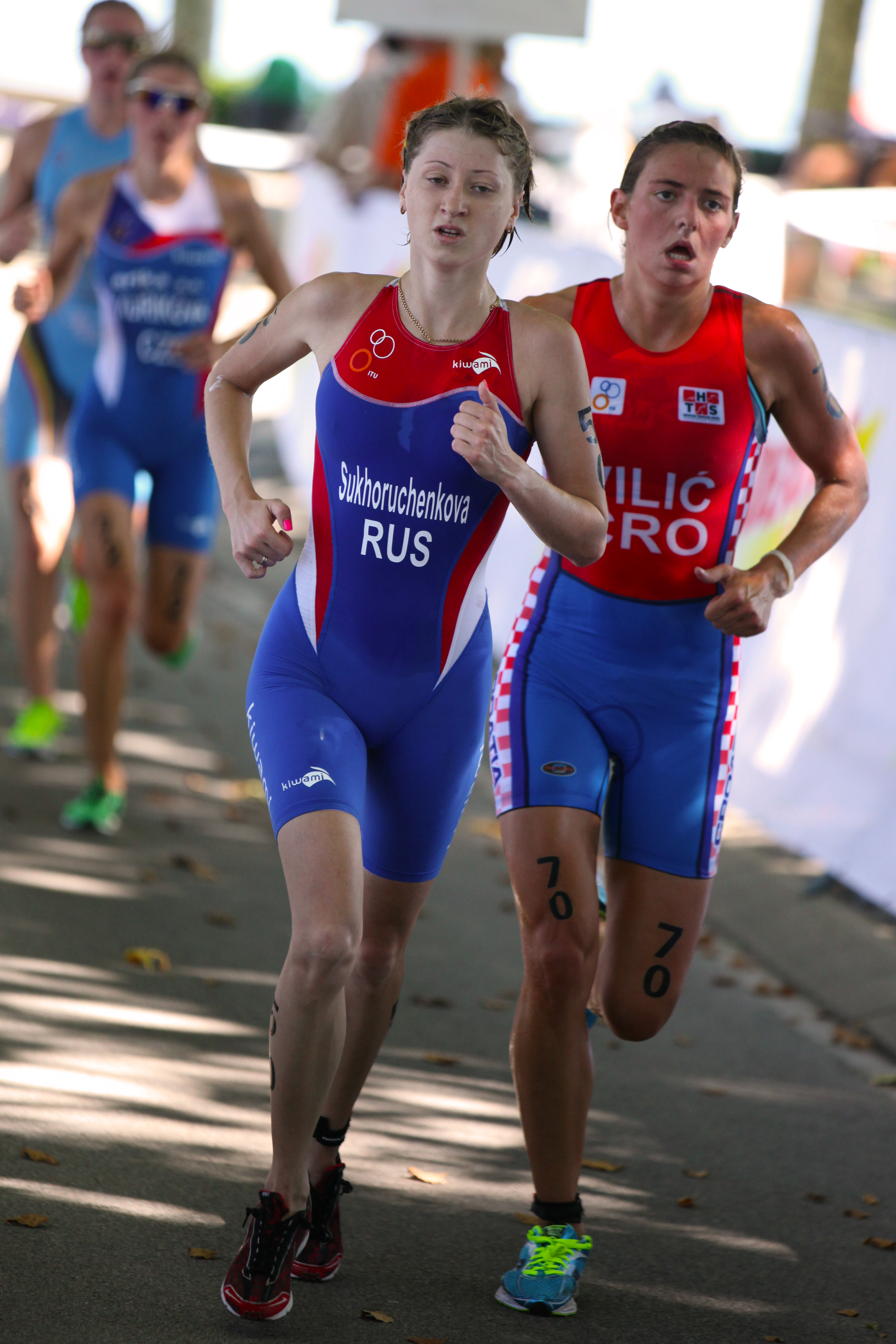
Sukhoruchenkova at the Sprint World Championships in Lausanne, 2011.

Yevgeniya Vyacheslavovna Koshelnikova Sukhoruchenkova (Russian: Евгения Вячеславовна Кошельникова Сухорученкова, also transliterated as Evgenia Sukhoruchenkova; born 25 September 1986 in Stavropol) is a Russian professional triathlete, member of the Russian National Team (Duathlon), decorated with the Russian title Master of Sports (Мастер спорта), both U23 Duathlon European Champion and U23 Duathlon World Champion of the year 2009, and Russian Elite Aquathlon Champion 2011. In the Russian Cup of the year 2009 she placed fifth, sharing this position with Natalia Shliakhtenko.

Sukhoruchenkova is married with the Russian triathlete Nikolay Sukhoruchenkov (Николай Сухорученков) from Saint Petersburg and the ITU has replaced her maiden name, Koshelnikova, with her new family name, Sukhoruchenkova, also in result lists dating back to the time before her marriage. In Russian sources, however, up to 2008 she is named Koshelnikova (Кошельникова) and since 2009 the name form varies. Some media use the double name Кошельникова Сухорученкова, others choose one of her family names. The Russian Triathlon Federation has both forms. On its Profile Page she is called Кошельникова, in various official result lists, however, she is listed as Сухорученкова.

At various World Military Triathlon Championships Sukhoruchenkova was successful, too. In Hyderabad (2007) she won the bronze medal, in Satenas (2006) and Otepää (2008) she won the gold and the silver medal respectively in the team ranking, placing 10th and 9th in the individual ranking.

In Russia, Sukhoruchenkova represents the Stavropol High Performance Centre СУОР (Училище Олимпийского резерва Ставрополь).

== ITU Competitions ==
In the nine years from 2004 to 2012, Sukhoruchenkova took part in 49 ITU competitions and achieved 22 top ten positions. At her first ITU competition of the season 2011, Sukhoruchenkova won the gold medal at the Pan American Cup in Santiago. At the end of the season 2012, she won two gold medals at European Cup triathlons. The following list is based upon the official ITU rankings and the Athlete's Profile Page. Unless indicated otherwise, the following events are triathlons (Olympic Distance) and belong to the Elite category.

Date	Competition	Place	Rank
2004-10-27	European Cup (Elite)	Alanya	4
2005-07-17	European Championships (U23)	Sofia	DNS
2005-07-23	European Championships (Junior)	Alexandroupoli(s)	21
2005-07-24	European Championships (Junior Relay)	Alexandroupoli(s)	10
2005-10-26	Premium European Cup	Alanya	12
2006-06-04	BG World Cup	Madrid	DNF
2006-07-30	BG World Cup	Salford	57
2007-05-20	European Cup	Limassol	4
2007-06-10	European Cup	Kusadasi	6
2007-08-25	European Cup	Split	5
2007-10-07	BG World Cup	Rhodes	DNS
2007-10-24	Premium European Cup	Alanya	5
2007-12-01	BG World Cup	Eilat	42
2008-04-13	European Cup	Chania	DNS
2008-08-03	European Cup	Egirdir	11
2008-09-06	European Championships (U23)	Pulpí	21
2008-09-20	European Cup and Balkan Championships	Belgrade	2
2008-10-26	Premium European Cup	Alanya	12
2009-05-23	Duathlon European Championships (U23)	Budapest	1
2009-08-02	European Cup	Egirdir	5
2009-09-26	Duathlon World Championships (U23)	Concord	1
2009-10-25	Premium European Cup	Alanya	17
2010-03-26	Asian Cup	Mekong River	2
2010-04-11	European Cup	Quarteira	32
2010-05-01	Duathlon European Championships	Nancy	6
2010-06-12	Elite Cup	Hy-Vee	38
2010-07-17	Dextro Energy World Championship Series	Hamburg	36
2010-08-08	World Cup	Tiszaújváros	29
2010-09-03	Duathlon World Championships	Edinburgh	14
2010-09-08	Dextro Energy World Championship Series, Grand Final	Budapest	DNF
2010-09-08	Aquathlon World Championships	Budapest	6
2011-03-20	Pan American Cup	Santiago	1
2011-03-27	Premium Pan American Cup	Valparaiso	5
2011-04-09	European Cup	Quarteira	22
2011-05-08	World Cup	Monterrey	DNF
2011-06-04	Dextro Energy World Championship Series	Madrid	52
2011-07-03	European Cup	Penza	1
2011-07-16	Dextro Energy World Championship Series	Hamburg	DNF
2011-07-03	Sprint World Championships	Lausanne	42
2011-11-02	Premium European Cup	Alanya	11
2012-03-24	World Cup	Mooloolaba	DNF
2012-04-14	World Triathlon Series	Sydney	DNF
2012-04-22	World Cup	Ishigaki	DNF
2012-04-29	Powerman Long Distance & Sprint Duathlon European Championships	Horst	12
2012-05-06	European Cup	Antalya	12
2012-06-10	Sprint European Cup	Cremona	14
2012-07-01	European Cup	Istanbul	9
2012-07-07	Premium European Cup	Holten	2
2012-08-19	European Cup	Penza	4
2012-09-22	Duathlon World Championships	Nancy	7
2012-09-29	Sprint European Cup	Mondello	1
2012-10-06	Premium European Cup	Alanya	1

BG = the sponsor British Gas · DNF = did not finish · DNS = did not start
