= Igor Sysoyev =

Russian triathlete (1980–2024)

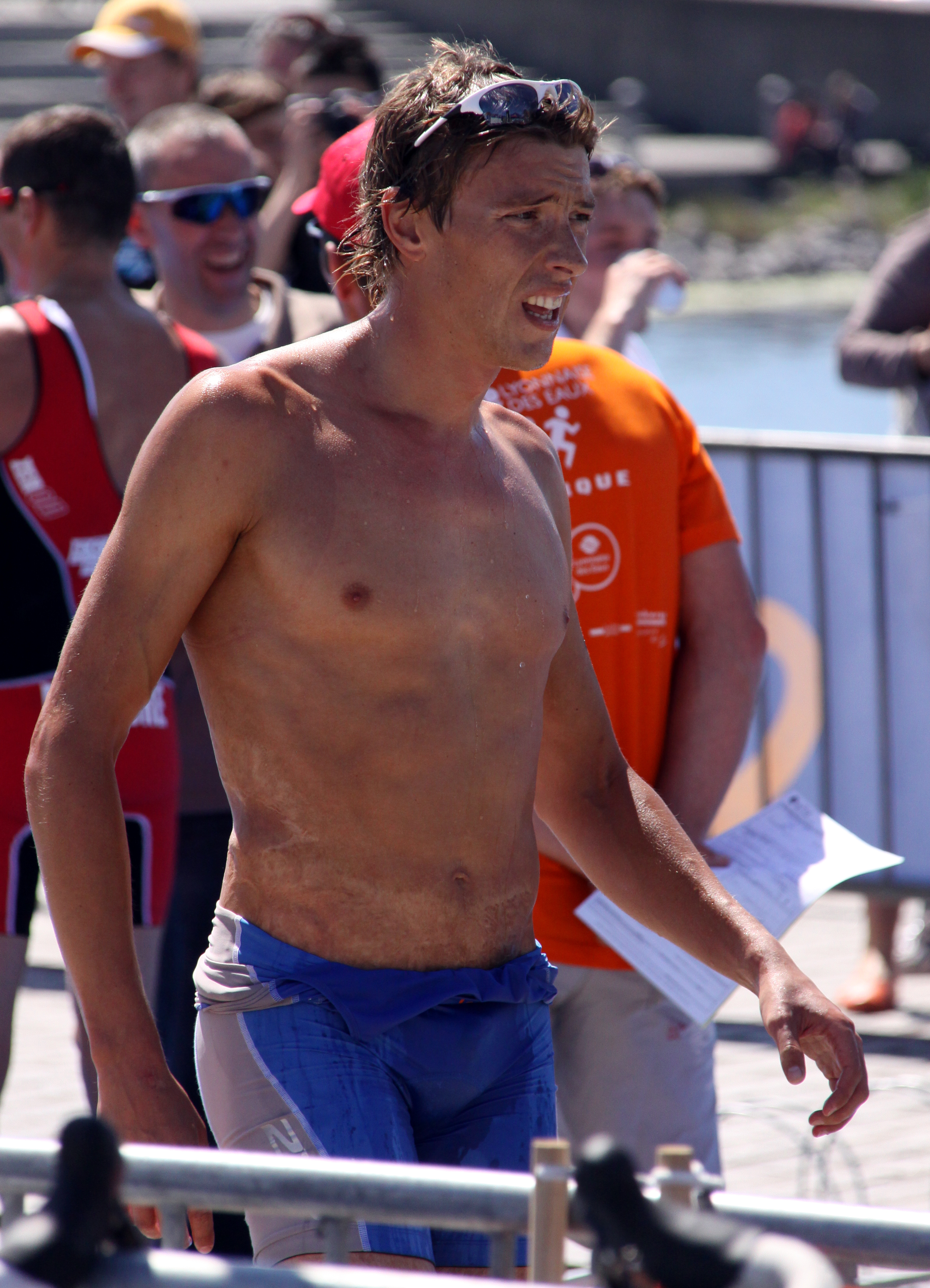
Igor Sysoev representing Metz Tri at the first race of the French Club Championship Series in Dunkirk (2010)

Igor Vladimirovich Sysoyev (Russian: Игорь Владимирович Сысоев, also transliterated as Sysoev; 5 September 1980 – 12 May 2024) was a Russian professional triathlete.

== Background ==
Igor Vladimirovich Sysoyev was born in Leningrad on 5 September 1980. From 2003, he was married to the Russian triathlete and long‑distance swimmer Irina Abysova. He died in a traffic collision in Temryuksky District on 12 May 2024, at the age of 43.

== Personal life ==
In 2003, Sysoyev married the Russian open‑water swimmer and professional triathlete Irina Abysova. In 2004, they had a daughter.

== Career ==
Sysoyev was the winner of the Russian Cup in 2009 and, according to the official Russian rating for 2009, which takes into account various Russian and international competitions, he was ranked 10th among the best Russian triathletes. At the 2010 Russian Championships in Penza, Sysoyev placed 5th.

In 2010, Sysoyev took part in the Club Championship Series Lyonnaise des Eaux, representing the club Metz Tri. At the opening triathlon of the French circuit in Dunkirk (23 May 2010), he placed 20th. At the Triathlon de Paris (18 July 2010), he placed 80th. However, at the Grand Final in La Baule (Triathlon Audencia, 18 September 2010), he was again the best in his club, placing 18th.

== ITU competitions ==
In the ten years from 2001 to 2009, Sysoyev took part in 67 ITU competitions and achieved 24 top‑ten finishes.

At the Olympic Games in Athens, he placed 15th, and at the Olympic Games in Beijing, he placed 9th. The following list is based on the official ITU rankings and the ITU Athlete's Profile Page. Unless otherwise indicated, the following events are triathlons and belong to the Elite category.

Date	Competition	Place	Rank
2001-05-13	World Cup	Rennes	38
2002-05-19	World Cup	Ishigaki	30
2002-10-13	World Cup	Madeira	24
2002-10-23	European Cup	Alanya	3
2003-04-26	World Cup	St Anthonys	33
2003-06-01	European Cup	Zundert	17
2003-06-07	World Cup	Tongyeong	11
2003-06-15	World Cup	Gamagori	19
2003-08-10	World Cup	New York	14
2003-09-06	World Cup	Hamburg	27
2003-09-21	World Cup	Madrid	27
2003-11-02	World Cup	Cancún	20
2003-11-09	World Cup	Rio de Janeiro	8
2004-04-11	World Cup	Ishigaki	19
2004-04-18	European Championships	Valencia	11
2004-05-09	World Championships	Madeira	5
2004-07-25	World Cup	Salford	17
2004-08-01	World Cup	Tiszaújváros	8
2004-08-25	Olympic Games	Athens	15
2005-06-05	World Cup	Madrid	20
2005-07-31	World Cup	Salford	23
2005-08-06	World Cup	Hamburg	14
2005-08-20	European Championships	Lausanne	15
2005-09-10	World Championships	Gamagori	31
2005-10-26	Premium European Cup	Alanya	9
2006-03-10	World Cup	Aqaba	9
2006-06-04	BG World Cup	Madrid	15
2006-06-23	European Championships	Autun	10
2006-08-13	BG World Cup	Tiszaújváros	9
2006-09-02	World Championships	Lausanne	24
2006-09-09	BG World Cup	Hamburg	21
2006-09-24	BG World Cup	Beijing	17
2006-11-05	BG World Cup	Cancún	15
2007-03-25	BG World Cup	Mooloolaba	26
2007-05-06	BG World Cup	Lisbon	11
2007-06-03	BG World Cup	Madrid	14
2007-06-29	European Championships	Copenhagen	9
2007-07-07	Premium European Cup	Holten	1
2007-08-11	BG World Cup	Tiszaújváros	22
2007-08-25	European Cup	Split	2
2007-08-30	BG World Championships	Hamburg	17
2007-09-09	Premium European Cup	Kędzierzyn-Koźle	3
2007-09-15	BG World Cup	Beijing	28
2007-10-07	BG World Cup	Rhodes	49
2007-10-24	Premium European Cup	Alanya	9
2007-11-04	BG World Cup	Cancún	DNF
2008-04-13	BG World Cup	Ishigaki	16
2008-04-26	BG World Cup	Tongyeong	8
2008-05-10	European Championships	Lisbon	DNF
2008-06-05	BG World Championships	Vancouver	7
2008-07-13	BG World Cup	Tiszaújváros	DNS
2008-07-20	BG World Cup	Kitzbühel	19
2008-08-18	Olympic Games	Beijing	9
2008-09-07	Premium European Cup	Kędzierzyn-Koźle	1
2008-09-13	European Cup	Vienna	3
2009-04-05	European Cup	Quarteira	6
2009-05-02	Dextro Energy World Championship Series	Tongyeong	23
2009-05-17	Premium European Cup	Pontevedra	DNF
2009-08-30	Premium European Cup	Kędzierzyn-Koźle	2
2009-10-25	Premium European Cup	Alanya	4
2009-11-08	World Cup	Huatulco	DNF
2010-04-11	Dextro Energy World Championship Series	Sydney	37
2010-04-17	European Cup	Antalya	5
2010-05-08	Dextro Energy World Championship Series	Seoul	29
2010-08-29	Premium European Cup	Almere	17
2010-10-24	Premium European Cup	Alanya	9
2010-11-13	Premium European Cup	Eilat	6
2011-04-03	European Cup	Antalya	16
2011-07-03	European Cup	Penza	10

BG = the sponsor British Gas · DNF = did not finish · DNS = did not start
