= Lyubov Polyanskaya =

Russian triathlete

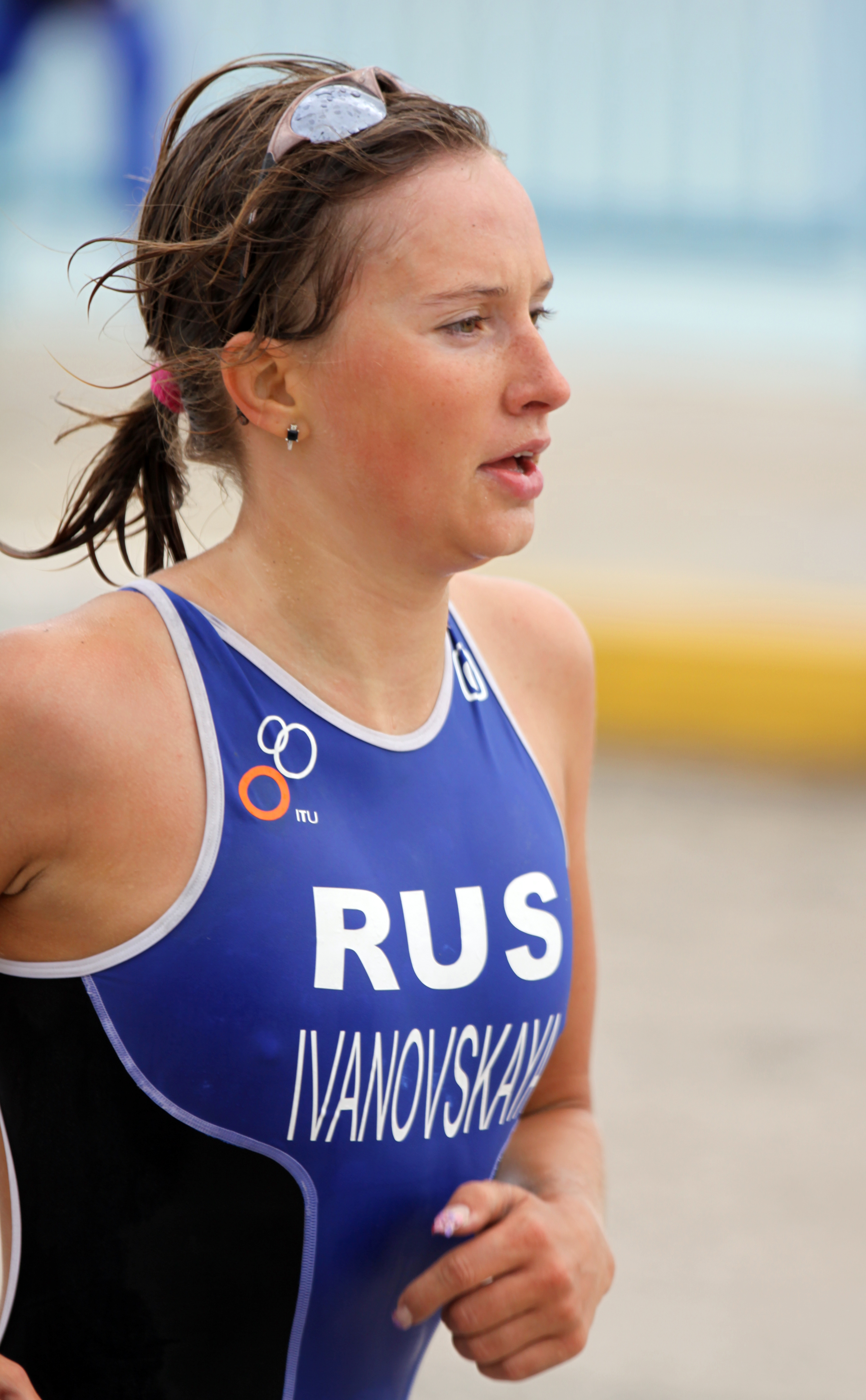
- Lyubov Ivanovskaya at the European Cup in Antalya, 2011.

Personal information
- Full name: Lyubov Andreyevna Ivanovskaya Polyanskaya
- Nationality: Russian
- Born: 20 June 1989 (age 37) Yaroslavl

Sport
- Country: Russia
- Sport: Triathlon

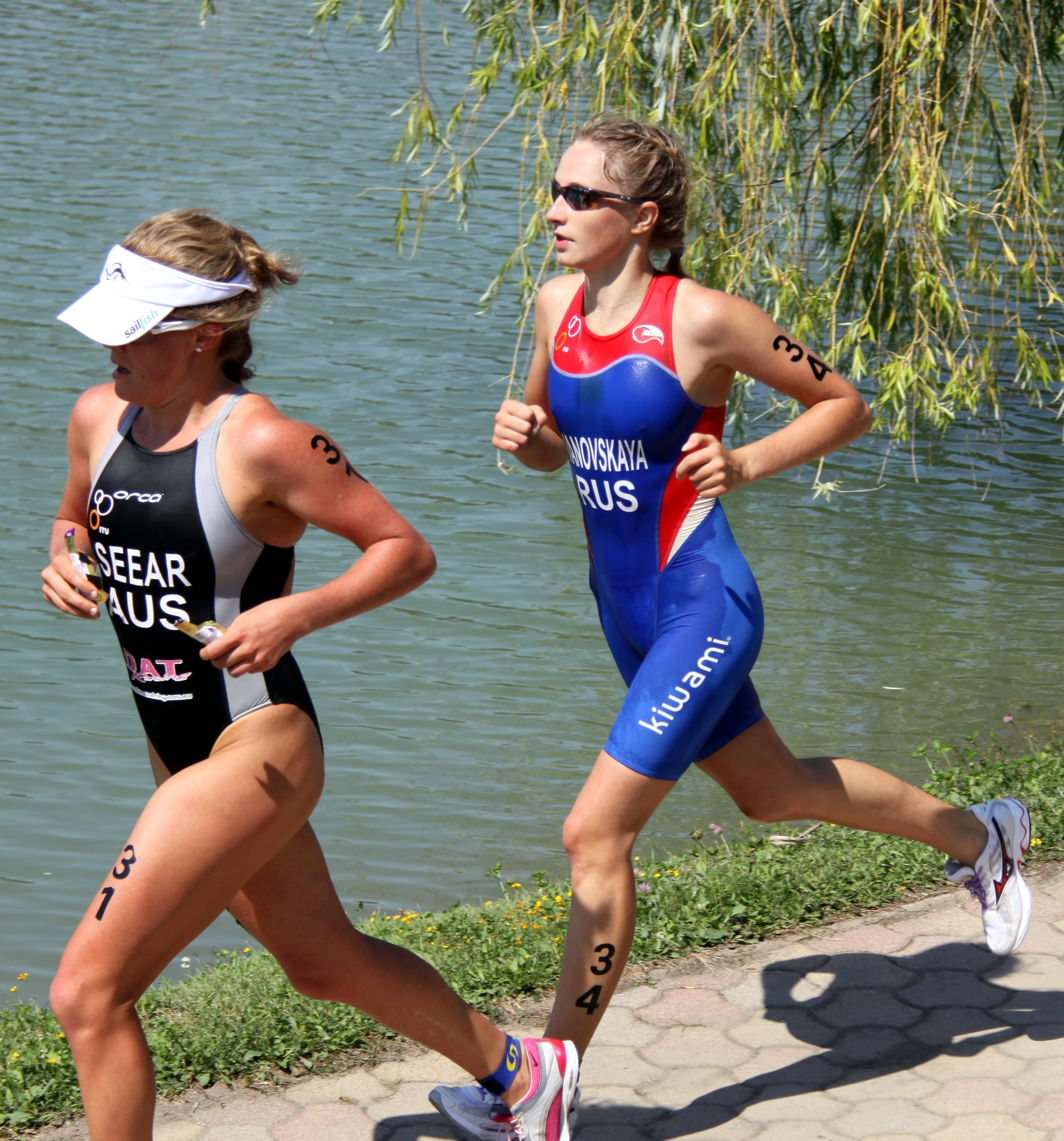
Lyubov Ivanovskaya chasing Seear at the World Cup in Tiszaújváros, 2009.

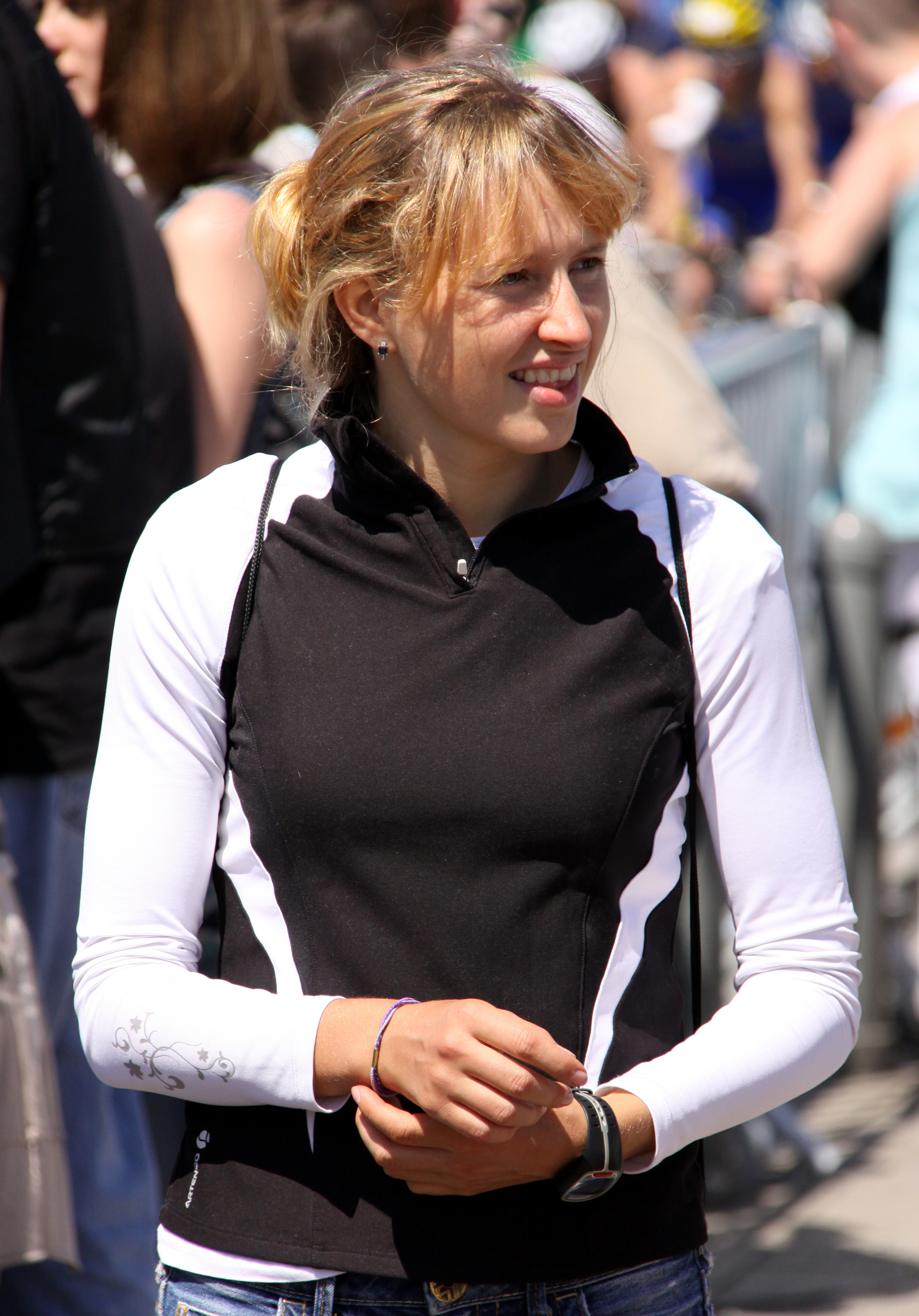
Lyubov Ivanovskaya after the Triathlon de Dunkerque, 2010.

Lyubov Andreyevna Ivanovskaya Polyanskaya (Russian Любовь Андреевна Ивановская, also transliterated as Lubov or, e.g. by the ITU, as Liubov Ivanovskaya), born 20 June 1989, is a Russian professional triathlete from Yaroslavl and a permanent member of the Russian National Elite Team. Lyubov Ivanovskaya's maiden name still appears in official ITU rankings, in official FTR documents, however, she is now referred to with her new surname Polyanskaya only.

== Sports career ==
Lyubov Ivanovskaya attended a high performance sports school in Yaroslavl, the Специализированная детско-юношеская школа олимпийского резерва N. 7. In 2005, she was among the 60 excellent students who were granted 500 ruble a month by the governor of the Oblast Yaroslavl. According to the Russian Triathlon Federation's ranking of the year 2009, she was number 4 of all Russian female Elite triathletes, and number 7 in the Russian Cup ranking. In the individual Elite ranking of the year 2010 Ivanovskaya is number 5. At the 2010 Youth Spartakiad she placed 4th. At the Russian Elite Aquathlon Championships 2011 Ivanovskaya won the bronze medal.

Ivanovskaya also took part in various non ITU events, e.g. in Cyprus on 12 April 2009 and in Brazil on 28 February 2010.

== French Club Championship Series ==
In 2010 Lyubov Ivanovskaya took part in the prestigious French Club Championship series Lyonnaise des Eaux representing the club Sainte-Geneviève Triathlon. The only triathlon of this circuit she attended, however, was the opening triathlon at Dunkirk (23 May 2010). Though placing 44th, Ivanovskaya was among the three triathlètes classants l'équipe and the second best runner of her club behind Alexandra Razarenova.

== ITU Competitions ==
In the seven years from 2004 to 2010, Ivanovskaya took part in 25 ITU competitions and achieved 10 top ten positions. The following list is based upon the official ITU rankings and the Athlete's Profile Page. Unless indicated otherwise, the events are triathlons (Olympic Distance) and belong to the Elite category.

Date	Competition	Place	Rank
2004-10-27	European Cup	Alanya	22
2005-10-26	Premium European Cup	Alanya	31
2006-10-18	European Cup (Junior)	Alanya	7
2007-06-29	European Championships (Junior)	Copenhagen	19
2007-08-30	BG World Championships (Junior)	Hamburg	39
2007-10-24	European Cup (Junior)	Alanya	5
2008-05-10	European Championships (Junior)	Lisbon	15
2008-06-05	BG World Championships (Junior)	Vancouver	25
2008-09-06	European Championships (U23)	Pulpí	DNF
2008-10-26	Premium European Cup	Alanya	19
2009-07-05	Premium Asian Cup	Burabay	2
2009-07-12	Asian Cup	Kokshetau	DNF
2009-08-09	World Cup	Tiszaújváros	31
2009-08-23	European Cup	Karlovy Vary (Carlsbad)	12
2009-08-30	Premium European Cup	Kedzierzyn Kozle	14
2009-10-10	Asian Cup	Palembang	2
2009-10-10	Aquathlon Asian Championships	Palembang	2
2009-10-17	Premium Asian Cup	Hong Kong	6
2009-11-08	World Cup	Huatulco	17
2010-05-30	African Cup	Larache	7
2010-08-28	European Championships (U23)	Vila Nova de Gaia (Porto)	7
2010-09-08	Dextro Energy World Championship Series, Grand Final: U23 World Championship	Budapest	16
2010-10-16	World Cup	Tongyeong	DNF
2010-10-24	Premium European Cup	Alanya	7
2010-11-13	Premium European Cup	Eilat	9
2011-04-03	European Cup	Antalya	15
2011-04-17	World Cup	Ishigaki	DNF
2011-07-03	European Cup	Penza	5

BG = the sponsor British Gas · DNF = did not finish
