= Anastasiya Polyanskaya =

Ukrainian-Russian triathlete (born 1986)

Personal information
- Born: Anastasiya Yatsenko; 5 February 1986 (age 40) Zhovti Vody, Ukraine
- Spouse: Dmitry Polyanski (m. 2007)

Sport
- Country: Ukraine / Russia
- Sport: Triathlon

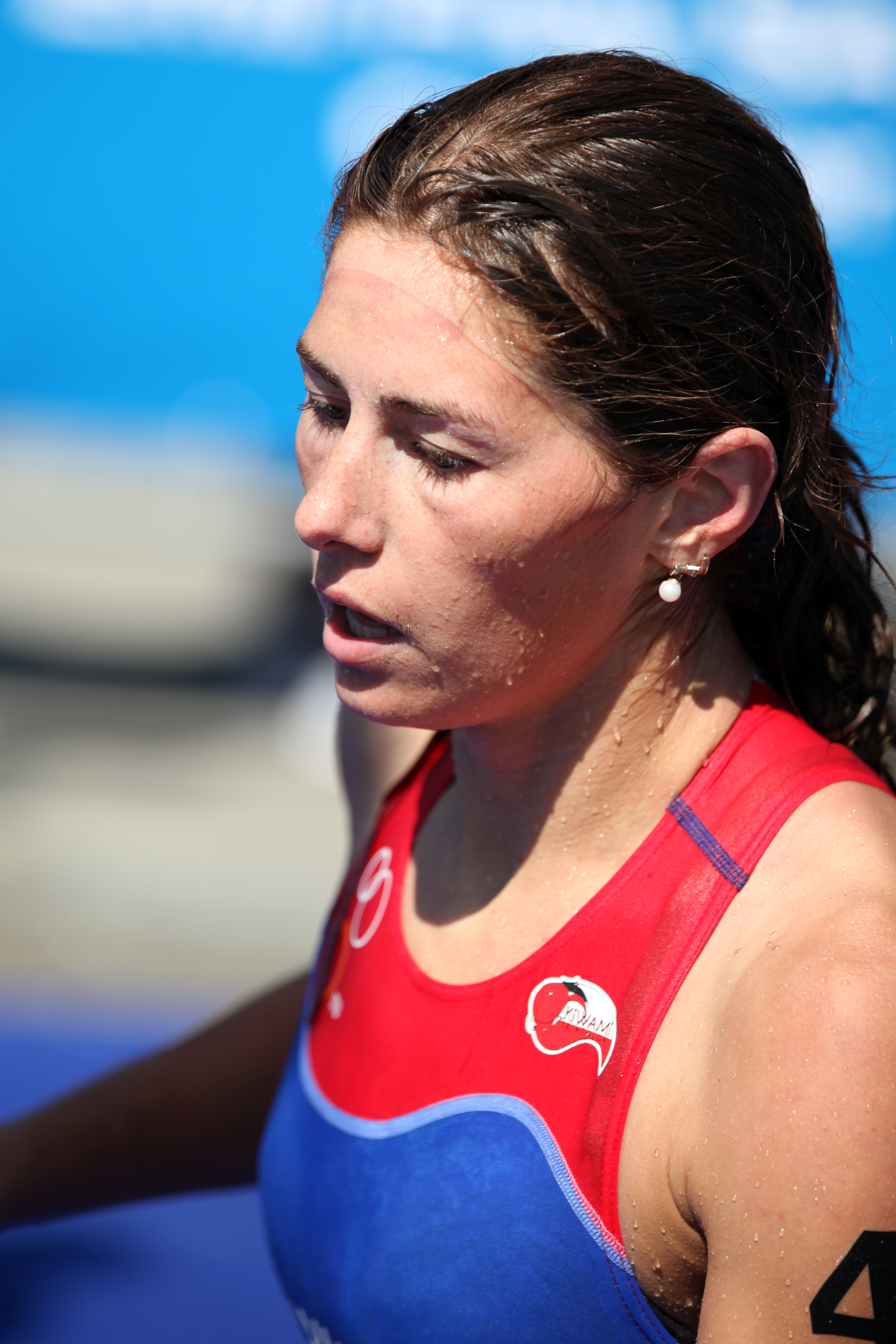
Anastasiya Polyanskaya in the transition zone at the Sprint World Championship in Lausanne, 2011.

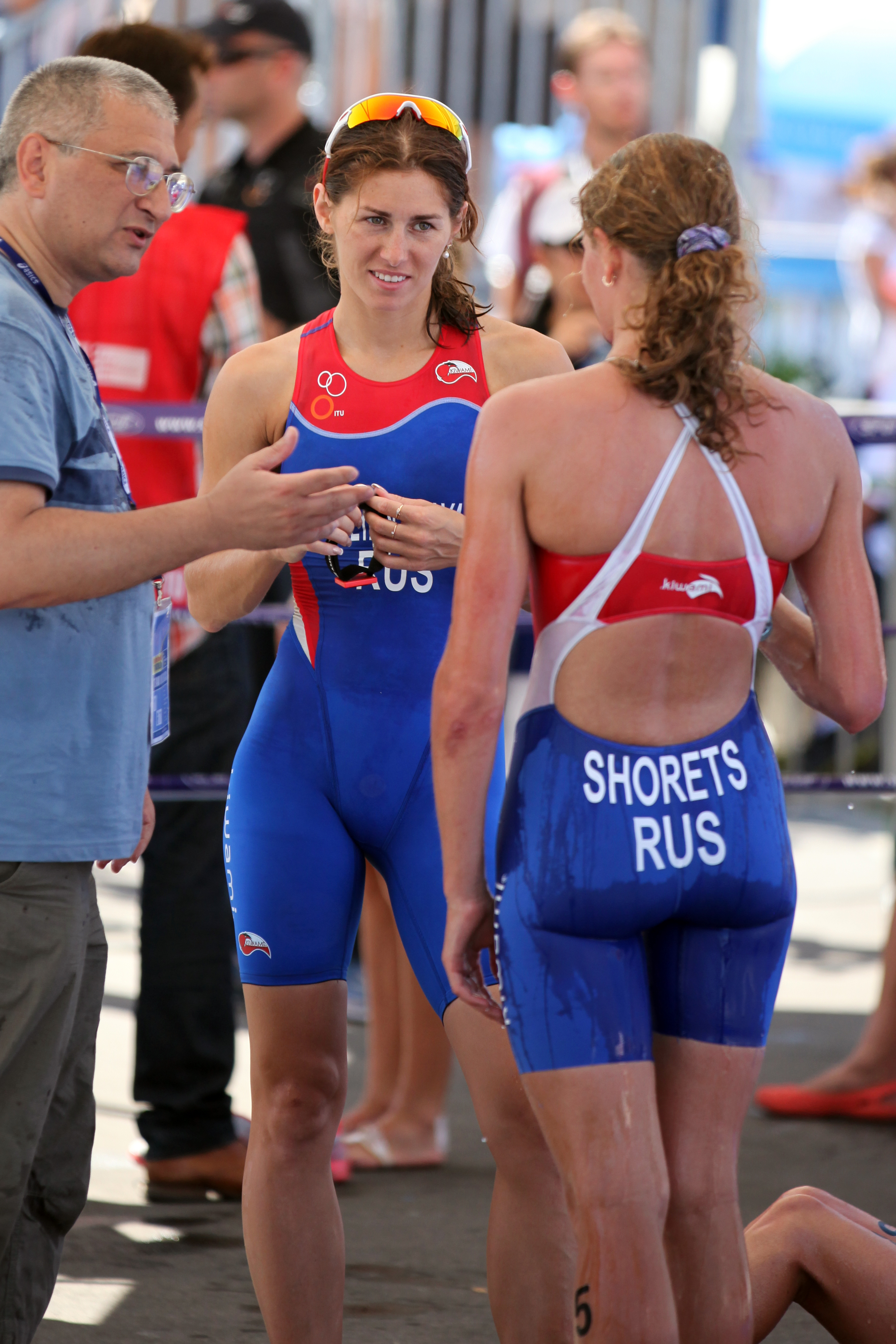
Anastasiya Polyanskaya talking with Shorets after the Sprint Championship in Lausanne, 2011.

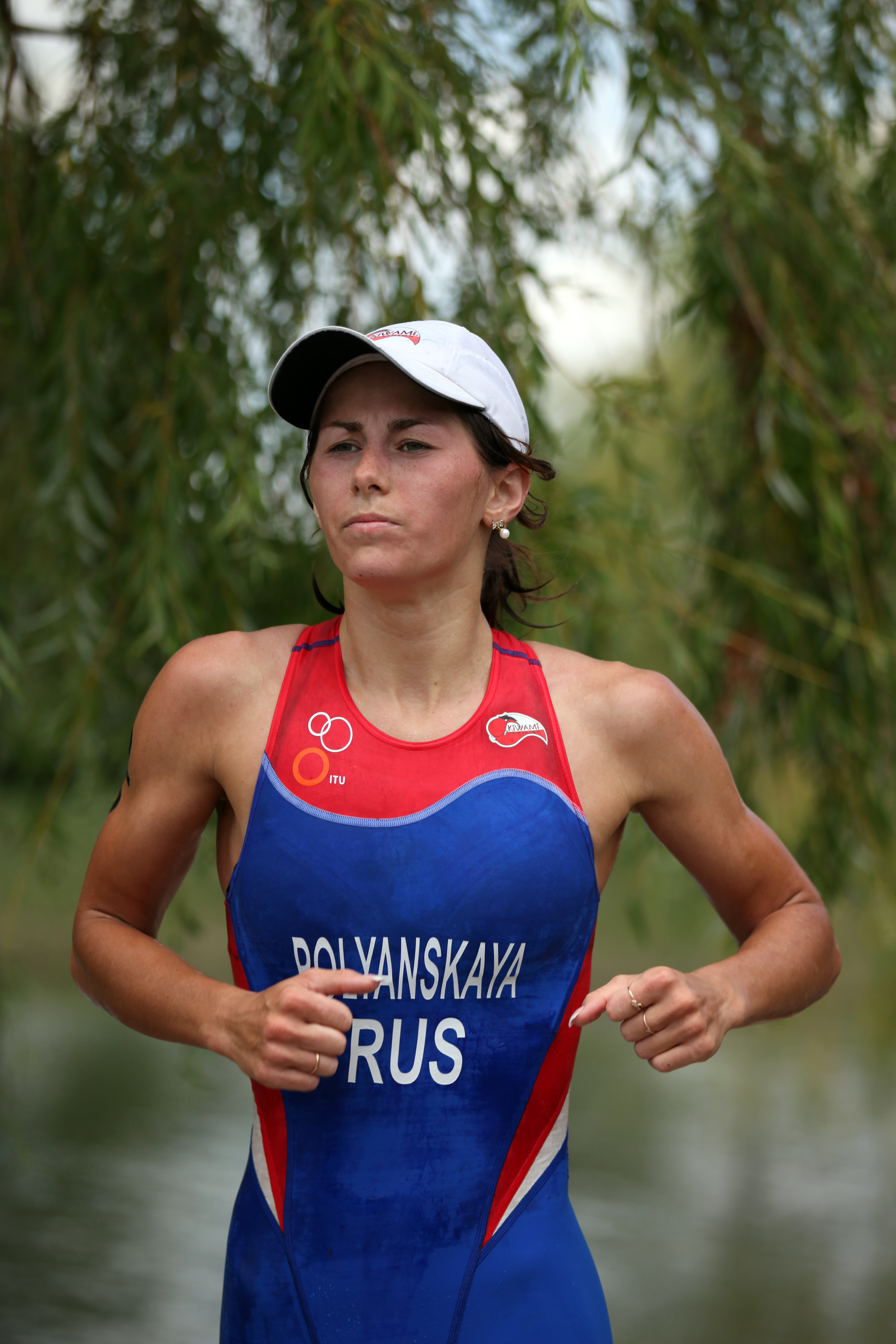
Anastasiya Polyanskaya at the World Cup in Tiszaújváros, 2011.

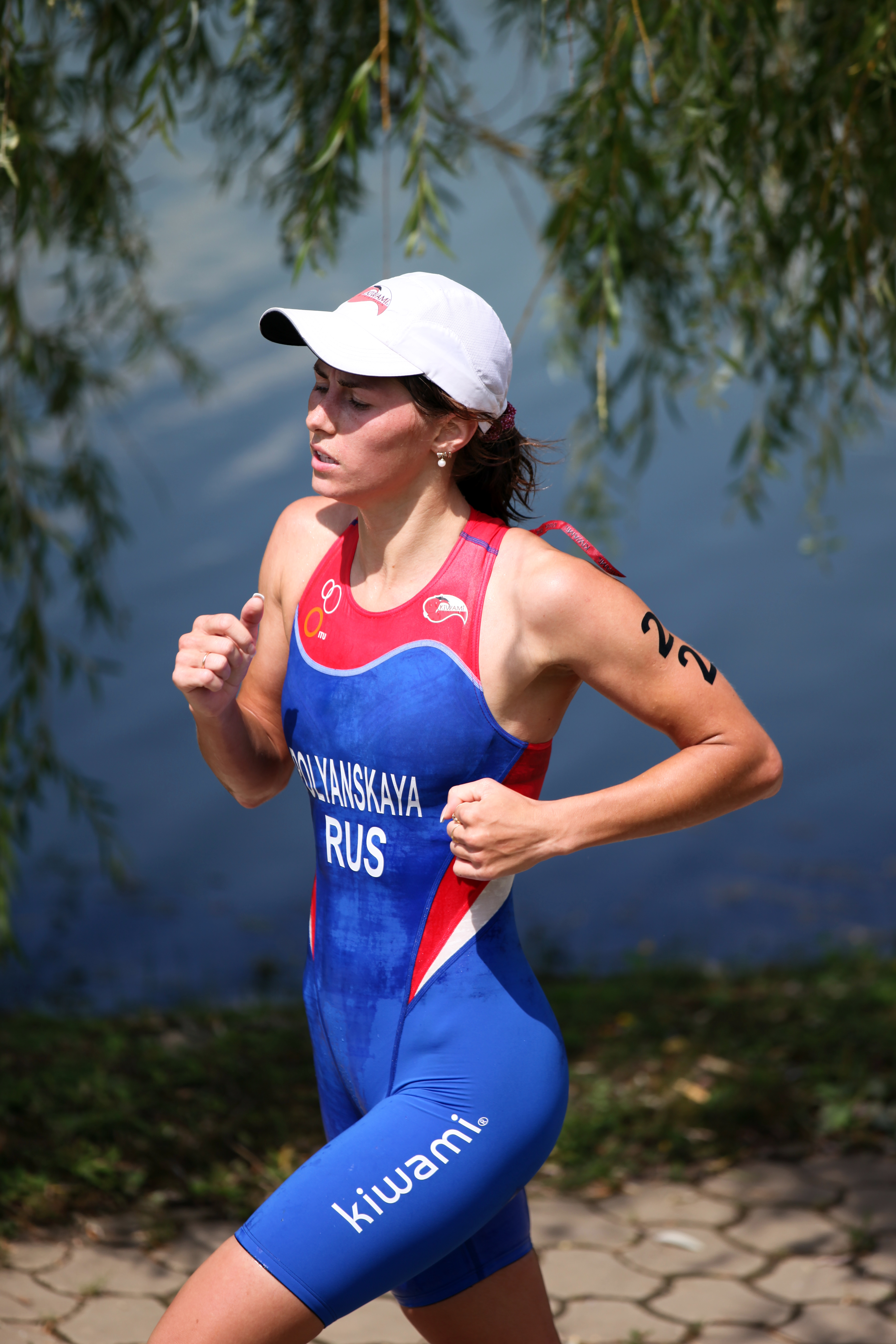
Anastasiya Polyanskaya at the World Cup in Tiszaújváros, 2011.

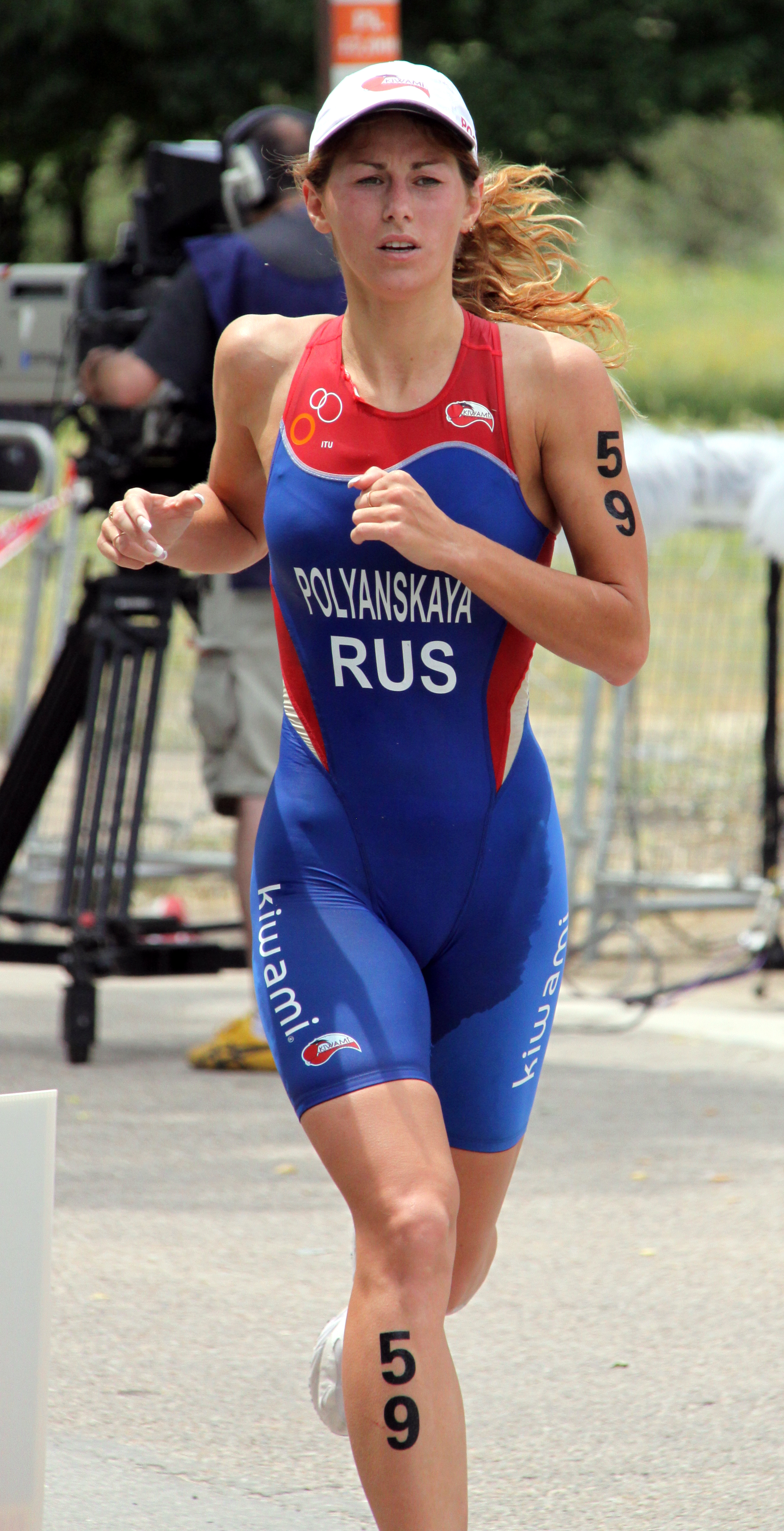
Anastasiya Polyanskaya at the World Championship Series triathlon in Madrid, 2010.

Anastasiya Sergeyevna Polyanskaya, née Yatsenko (Russian: Анастасия Сергеевна Полянская Яценко; her first name is also transliterated as Anastasia by the ITU; born 5 February 1986 in Zhovti Vody) is a professional Ukrainian and Russian triathlete, Russian Supersprint Champion of the year 2009 and 2010, and permanent member of the Russian National Team.

Anastasiya Polyanskaya was born and raised in Ukraine and competed for Ukraine up to 2007. On 27 May 2007 Polyanskaya's first daughter Elizaveta was born and on 14 December 2007 she married the Russian triathlete Dmitry Polyanski with whom she lives in Penza, where the Russian triathlon championships are held.

== ITU Competitions ==
In the nine years from 2002 to 2010, Anastasiya Polyanskaya took part in 48 ITU competitions and achieved 16 top ten positions, among which the two gold medals at Palembang (2009). In 2008, Polyanskaya took off a year because of the birth of her daughter. In March 2011, Polyanskaya opened the new season with two medals: silver at the Pan American Cup in Santiago, gold at the Premium Pan American Cup in Valparaíso. The following list is based upon the official ITU rankings and the athlete's Profile Page. Unless indicated otherwise, all the following events are triathlons (Olympic Distance) and refer to the Elite category.

Date	Competition	Place	Rank
2002-07-06	European Championships (Junior)	Győr	14
2002-11-09	World Championships (Junior)	Cancun	16
2003-05-31	European Cup	Brno	6
2003-06-21	European Championships (Junior)	Carlsbad	15
2003-10-22	European Cup	Alanya	10
2004-04-18	European Championships	Valencia	38
2004-05-09	World Championships (Junior)	Madeira	6
2004-07-03	European Cup	Holten	10
2004-08-01	World Cup	Tiszaújváros	20
2004-10-27	European Cup	Alanya	3
2005-06-05	World Cup	Madrid	14
2005-07-23	European Championships (Junior)	Alexandroupoli(s)	8
2005-07-31	World Cup	Salford	20
2005-08-14	World Cup	Tiszaújváros	13
2005-09-10	World Championships (Junior)	Gamagori	10
2005-09-17	OSIM World Cup	Beijing	28
2005-10-15	European Cup	Palermo	DNS
2005-10-26	Premium European Cup	Alanya	13
2006-03-10	World Cup	Aqaba	20
2006-06-04	BG World Cup	Madrid	29
2006-06-11	European Cup	Erdek	2
2006-06-23	European Championships	Autun	DNF
2006-07-08	European Championships (U23)	Rijeka	DNF
2006-07-15	Premium European Cup	Holten	9
2006-07-30	BG World Cup	Salford	48
2006-08-13	BG World Cup	Tiszaújváros	30
2006-09-02	World Championships	Lausanne	DNF
2006-09-24	BG World Cup	Beijing	DNS
2006-10-18	Premium European Cup	Alanya	DNF
2006-11-05	BG World Cup	Cancun	26
2007-04-15	BG World Cup	Ishigaki	56
2007-05-20	European Cup and Small States of Europe Championships	Limassol	DNS
2007-07-21	European Championships (U23)	Kuopio	DNS
2007-08-11	BG World Cup	Tiszaújváros	25
2007-08-30	BG World Championships (U23)	Hamburg	5
2007-09-15	BG World Cup	Beijing	39
2007-10-07	BG World Cup	Rhodes	34
2009-08-09	World Cup	Tiszaújváros	26
2009-09-26	European Cup	Mar Menor	5
2009-10-10	Asian Cup	Palembang	1
2009-10-10	Aquathlon Asian Championships	Palembang	1
2009-10-17	Premium Asian Cup	Hong Kong	5
2010-04-17	Premium European Cup	Antalya	8
2010-04-25	World Cup	Ishigaki	DNF
2010-06-05	Dextro Energy World Championship Series	Madrid	29
2010-06-27	Premium Asian Cup	Burabay	1
2010-07-03	European Championships	Athlone	29
2010-07-10	World Cup	Holten	23
2010-08-08	World Cup	Tiszaújváros	11
2010-08-14	Dextro Energy World Championship Series	Kitzbühel	DNF
2010-09-08	Dextro Energy World Championship Series, Grand Final	Budapest	39
2010-10-16	World Cup	Tongyeong	16
2011-03-20	Pan American Cup	Santiago	2
2011-03-27	Premium Pan American Cup	Valparaíso	1
2011-04-17	World Cup	Ishigaki	17
2011-05-08	World Cup	Monterrey	33
2011-06-04	Dextro Energy World Championship Series	Madrid	42
2011-06-18	Dextro Energy World Championship Series	Kitzbühel	DNF
2011-07-10	World Cup	Edmonton	26
2011-07-16	Dextro Energy World Championship Series	Hamburg	49
2011-08-14	World Cup	Tiszaújváros	29
2011-08-20	Dextro Energy World Championship Series: Sprint World Championships	Lausanne	DNF

DNF = did not finish · DNS = did not start
