= List of Russian sportspeople =

This is a list of notable sportspeople from the Russian Federation, Soviet Union, Russian Empire, and other Russian predecessor states, including ethnic Russians and people of other ethnicities. This list also includes those who were born in Russia but later emigrated, and those who were born elsewhere but immigrated to the country.

For the full plain list of Russian sportspeople on Wikipedia, see Category:Russian sportspeople.

== Alpine skiing ==
- Svetlana Gladysheva, Olympic silver medalist and World Championship bronze medalist
- Aleksandr Khoroshilov, Olympic skier
- Sergei Maitakov, 3rd place at the world junior ski championships
- Yevgeniya Sidorova, Olympic bronze medalist
- Varvara Zelenskaya, World Cup skier
- Aleksandr Zhirov, World Cup skier

== American football ==
- Charles Goldenberg
- Ace Gutowsky

== Archery ==
- Andrey Abramov, Olympic archer
- Bair Badënov, Olympic bronze medalist, 1st place at the European championships
- Natalia Bolotova, 2nd place at the world championships
- Miroslava Dagbaeva, Olympic archer
- Elena Dostay, Olympic archer
- Natalia Erdyniyeva, 3rd place at the world championships
- Margarita Galinovskaya, Olympic archer
- Boris Isachenko, Olympic silver medalist
- Dmitry Nevmerzhitsky, Olympic archer
- Balzhinima Tsyrempilov, 2nd place the world championships, 1st place at the European championships
- Vladimir Yesheyev, Olympic bronze medalist

== Arm wrestling ==
- Alexey Voyevoda

== Athletics ==
- Aleksandr Aksinin
- Natalya Antyukh
- Lyudmila Arkhipova
- Pyotr Bolotnikov
- Olga Bondarenko
- Valeriy Borchin
- Yuriy Borzakovskiy
- Lyudmila Bragina
- Valeriy Brumel
- Yuliya Chermoshanskaya
- Anna Chicherova
- Nadezhda Chizhova
- Aleksandra Fedoriva
- Gulnara Samitova-Galkina
- Tatyana Goyshchik
- Yuliya Gushchina
- Yelena Isinbayeva
- Vyacheslav Ivanenko
- Olga Kaniskina
- Tatyana Kazankina
- Sergey Kirdyapkin
- Vladimir Kiselyov
- Sergey Klyugin
- Vera Komisova
- Lyudmila Kondratyeva
- Vera Krepkina
- Svetlana Krivelyova
- Vladimir Krylov
- Olga Kuzenkova
- Elena Lashmanova
- Tatyana Lebedeva
- Mikhail Linge
- Natalya Lisovskaya
- Sergey Litvinov (born 1958), Olympic hammer thrower
- Sergey Litvinov (born 1986), his son
- Tatyana Lysenko
- Viktor Markin
- Svetlana Masterkova
- Irina Nazarova
- Olga Nazarova
- Yelena Nikolayeva
- Liliya Nurutdinova
- Andrey Perlov
- Yevgeniya Polyakova
- Nina Ponomaryova
- Irina Privalova
- Andrey Prokofyev
- Viktor Rashchupkin
- Yelena Romanova
- Yelena Ruzina
- Natalya Sadova
- Mariya Savinova
- Marina Shmonina
- Lyudmila Shevtsova
- Nikolay Sidorov
- Andrey Silnov
- Yelena Slesarenko
- Leonid Spirin
- Maksim Tarasov
- Ivan Ukhov
- Valentina Yegorova
- Yelena Yelesina
- Yuliya Zaripova
- Galina Zybina

== Badminton ==
- Ekaterina Ananina, Russian national champion
- Andrei Antropov, Olympic badminton player
- Ella Diehl, Russian national champion, Scottish International Open, and two-time Irish International winner
- Vladimir Ivanov, European doubles champion
- Sergey Ivlev, Russian national champion
- Irina Ruslyakova, Olympic badminton player
- Anastasia Russkikh, Russian national champion
- Valeria Sorokina, Olympic bronze medalist, European champion
- Ivan Sozonov, European doubles champion
- Nina Vislova, Olympic bronze medalist, European champion
- Marina Yakusheva, Olympic badminton player
- Misha Zilberman, Israeli Olympic badminton player
- Nikolai Zuyev, Olympic badminton player

== Bandy ==
- Vsevolod Blinkov, Russian national champion
- Mikhail Butusov, Russian national champion
- Nikolay Durakov, won the Bandy World Championship seven times
- Valeri Maslov, won the Bandy World Championship eight times
- Sergey Obukhov, Bandy World Cup, Champions Cup winner
- Vladimir Savdunin, Russian national champion
- Sergei Solovyov, Russian national champion

== Baseball ==
- Eddie Ainsmith, Played for various Major League Baseball teams
- Victor Cole, Played for the Kansas City Royals
- Jake Livingstone, Played for the New York Yankees
- Victor Starffin, First professional pitcher in Japan to win three hundred games

== Basketball ==
- Svetlana Abrosimova, Olympic bronze medalist
- Anna Arkhipova, Olympic bronze medalist
- Olga Arteshina, Olympic bronze medalist
- Ruslan Avleev, Olympic basketball player
- Elena Baranova, Olympic gold medalist
- Rasim Başak, Professional basketball player
- Sergei Bazarevich, 2nd place at the World championships, 2nd place at the European championships, played in the NBA
- Sergei Belov, Olympic gold medalist, two-time World champion, four-time European champion
- Sergei Bykov, European basketball champion
- Sergei Chikalkin, Russian national champion
- Ivan Chiriaev, Professional basketball player
- Aleksandr Dedushkin, Professional basketball player
- Fedor Dmitriev, Russian national champion
- Dmitri Domani, Professional basketball player
- Ivan Dvorny, Olympic gold medalist
- Andrei Fetisov, Professional basketball player
- Dmitry Flis, Professional basketball player
- Vitaly Fridzon, Professional basketball player
- Diana Goustilina, Olympic bronze medalist
- Becky Hammon, Olympic bronze medalist
- Travis Hansen, Professional basketball player
- Jon Robert Holden, Professional basketball player
- Maria Kalmykova, Olympic bronze medalist
- Vasily Karasev, 2nd place the World Championships, 2nd place at the European Championships
- Elena Karpova, Olympic bronze medalist
- Marina Karpunina, Olympic bronze medalist
- Anatoly Kashirov, Professional basketball player
- Sasha Kaun, Professional basketball player
- Victor Keyru, Professional basketball player
- Dmitri Khvostov, Professional basketball player
- Viktor Khryapa, European basketball champion
- Andrei Kirilenko, Professional basketball player, NBA All-Star
- Evgeny Kolesnikov, Professional basketball player
- Anatoly Konev, Olympic silver medalist, three-time European champion
- Yaroslav Korolev, Professional basketball player
- Ilona Korstin, Olympic bronze medalist
- Nikita Kurbanov, Professional basketball player
- Marina Kuzina, Olympic bronze medalist
- Fedor Likholitov, Professional basketball player
- Yekaterina Lisina, Olympic bronze medalist
- Kelly McCarty, Professional basketball player
- Cyrille Makanda, Professional basketball player
- Kelly Miller, Professional basketball player
- Sergei Monia, European basketball champion
- Nikita Morgunov, 2nd place at the World Championships, European basketball champion
- Timofey Mozgov, Professional basketball player
- Can Maxim Mutaf, Professional basketball player
- Anatoly Myshkin, Olympic bronze medalist, World champion, European champion
- Irina Osipova, Olympic bronze medalist
- Yuri Ozerov, Olympic silver medalist, European basketball champion
- Nikolay Padius, European basketball champion
- Svetlana Pankratova, professional basketball player
- Sergei Panov, 2nd place at the World Championships, 2nd place at the European Championships
- Evgeniy Pashutin, Professional basketball player
- Zakhar Pashutin, 2nd place at the World Championships, European basketball champion
- Alexander Petrenko, Professional basketball player
- Kirill Pichshalnikov, Professional basketball player
- Pavel Podkolzin, Professional basketball player
- Anton Ponkrashov, Professional basketball player
- Epiphanny Prince, Professional basketball player
- Oxana Rakhmatulina, Olympic bronze medalist
- Petr Samoylenko, Professional basketball player
- Aleksey Savrasenko, European basketball champion
- Nikita Shabalkin, Professional basketball player
- Tatiana Shchegoleva, Olympic bronze medalist
- Alexey Shved, Professional basketball player
- Dmitri Sokolov, Professional basketball player
- Irina Sokolovskaya, Olympic bronze medalist
- Maria Stepanova, Olympic bronze medalist
- Sergei Tarakanov, Olympic gold medalist, World champion, European basketball champion
- Yuri Vasiliev, Professional basketball player
- Viktor Vlasov, Olympic silver medalist, European basketball champion
- Natalia Vodopyanova, Olympic bronze medalist
- Gennadi Volnov, Olympic gold medalist, World champion, European basketball champion
- Evgeny Voronov, Professional basketball player
- Andrey Vorontsevich, Professional basketball player
- Egor Vyaltsev, OProfessional basketball player
- Olga Yakovleva, Professional basketball player
- Artem Zabelin, Professional basketball player
- Alexey Zhukanenko, Professional basketball player
- Aleksei Zozulin, Professional basketball player

== Beach volleyball ==
- Dmitri Barsouk, Olympic volleyball player, World Championship silver medalist
- Igor Kolodinsky, Olympic volleyball player, World Championship silver medalist
- Alexandra Shiryayeva, Olympic volleyball player, European volleyball champion
- Natalya Uryadova, Olympic volleyball player, European volleyball champion

== Biathlon ==
- Albina Akhatova, Olympic gold medalist, World biathlon champion
- Anna Bogaliy-Titovets, Olympic gold medalist, World biathlon champion
- Anna Boulygina, Olympic gold medalist, World biathlon champion
- Anna Burmistrova, Olympic gold medalist, World biathlon champion
- Svetlana Tchernusova, World biathlon champion
- Vladimir Drachev, Olympic silver medalist, World biathlon champion
- Rustam Garifoullin, Olympic gold medalist, World biathlon champion
- Natalia Guseva, Olympic bronze medalist, World biathlon champion
- Ekaterina Iourieva, World biathlon champion
- Maria Iovleva, Olympic gold medalist, World biathlon champion
- Svetlana Ishmouratova, Olympic gold medalist, World biathlon champion
- Elena Khrustaleva, Olympic gold medalist, World biathlon champion
- Valeri Kiriyenko, Olympic silver medalist, World biathlon champion
- Galina Koukleva, Olympic gold medalist, World biathlon champion
- Nikolay Kruglov, Olympic gold medalist, World biathlon champion
- Nikolay Kruglov, Jr., Olympic gold medalist, World biathlon champion
- Anastasiya Kuzmina, Olympic gold medalist, World biathlon champion
- Viktor Maigourov, Olympic bronze medalist, World biathlon champion
- Irina Malgina, Olympic gold medalist, World biathlon champion
- Valeriy Medvedtsev, Olympic gold medalist, World biathlon champion
- Olga Medvedtseva, Olympic gold medalist, World biathlon champion
- Olga Melnik, Olympic silver medalist, World biathlon champion
- Pavel Muslimov, Olympic bronze medalist
- Luiza Noskova, Olympic gold medalist, World biathlon champion
- Nikolay Polukhin, Olympic gold medalist, World biathlon champion
- Eugeni Redkine, Olympic gold medalist, World biathlon champion
- Anfisa Reztsova, Olympic gold medalist, World biathlon champion
- Yana Romanova, Professional biathlete
- Olga Romasko, Olympic silver medalist, World biathlon champion
- Pavel Rostovtsev, Professional biathlete
- Sergei Rozhkov, Professional biathlete
- Anton Shipulin, Olympic bronze medalist, World biathlon champion
- Svetlana Sleptsova, Olympic gold medalist, World biathlon champion
- Natalya Snytina, Olympic gold medalist, World biathlon champion
- Natalya Sokolova, Professional biathlete
- Nadezhda Talanova, Olympic gold medalist, World biathlon champion
- Sergei Tarasov, Olympic gold medalist, World biathlon champion
- Mikhail Terentiev, Olympic gold medalist, World biathlon champion
- Sergei Tchepikov, Olympic gold medalist, World biathlon champion
- Ivan Tcherezov, Olympic gold medalist, World biathlon champion
- Maxim Tchoudov, Olympic gold medalist, World biathlon champion
- Andrey Tokarev, Olympic gold medalist, World biathlon champion
- Evgeny Ustyugov, Olympic gold medalist, World biathlon champion
- Olga Vilukhina, Olympic silver medalist
- Dmitri Yaroshenko, World biathlon champion
- Olga Zaitseva, Olympic gold medalist, World biathlon champion
- Irek Zaripov, Olympic gold medalist, World biathlon champion

== Bobsleigh ==
- Dmitry Abramovitch
- Konstantin Aladachvili
- Vladimir Aleksandrov
- Alexey Andryunin
- Kristina Bader
- Elena Doronina
- Olga Fyodorova
- Sergey Golubev
- Nikolay Hrenkov
- Alexey Kireev
- Alevtina Kovalenko
- Petr Moiseev
- Denis Moiseychenkov
- Alexey Negodaylo
- Roman Oreshnikov
- Evgeny Pechonkin
- Yevgeni Popov
- Sergey Prudnikov
- Alexei Seliverstov
- Anastasia Skulkina
- Kirill Sosunov
- Dmitriy Stepushkin
- Yulia Timofeeva
- Viktoria Tokovaya
- Dmitry Trunenkov
- Alexander Ushakov
- Alexey Voyevoda
- Filipp Yegorov
- Andrey Yurkov
- Alexandr Zubkov

== Bodybuilding ==
- Varya Akulova
- Aleksandr Fyodorov
- Evgeny Mishin
- Konstantin Nerchenko
- Sergei Ogorodnikov
- Elena Panova
- Mikhail Sazonov
- Aziz Shavershian
- Sergey Shelestov
- Efim Shifrin
- Elena Shportun
- Ramesses Tlyakodugov
- Vladimir Turchinsky

== Bowling ==
- Maria Bulanova

== Boxing ==
- Aleksandr Alekseyev
- Georgy Balakshin
- Denis Boytsov
- Valery Brudov
- Dmitry Bivol
- Artur Beterbiev
- Roman Karmazin
- Sergey Kazakov
- Matvey Korobov
- Alexander Maletin
- Egor Mekhontsev
- Dmitry Pirog
- Aleksandr Povetkin
- Roman Romanchuk
- Oleg Saitov
- Aleksei Tishchenko
- Kostya Tszyu
- Nikolai Valuev
- Sergey Vodopyanov
- Andrey Zamkovoy
- Roman Zentsov

== Bridge ==
- Irina Levitina

== Chess ==
- Alexander Alekhine
- Ekaterina Atalik
- Mikhail Botvinnik
- Elisabeth Bykova
- Dmitry Jakovenko
- Anatoly Karpov
- Garry Kasparov
- Alexandra Kosteniuk
- Vladimir Kramnik
- Boris Maliutin
- Vasily Smyslov
- Artyom Timofeev
- Sergey Volkov

== Canoeing ==
- Aleksandr Artemida
- Sergey Chemerov
- Viktor Denisov
- Yevgeniy Dorokhin
- Alexander Dyachenko
- Konstantin Fomichev
- Sergey Gaikov
- Vitaly Galkov
- Vitaliy Gankin
- Nina Gopova
- Oleg Gorobiy
- Natalya Gouilly
- Evgeny Ignatov
- Vladimir Grushikhin
- Aleksandr Ivanik
- Andrey Kabanov
- Maria Kazakova
- Sergey Khovanskiy
- Artem Kononuk
- Pavel Konovalov
- Sergey Kosilov
- Larissa Kosorukova
- Olga Kostenko
- Aleksandr Kostoglod
- Ignat Kovalev
- Aleksandr Vladimirovich Kovalyov
- Galina Kreft
- Roman Kruglyakov
- Danila Kuznetsov
- Mikhail Kuznetsov
- Vladimir Ladosha
- Dmitry Larionov
- Anton Lazko
- Alexander Lipatov
- Nikolay Lipkin
- Natalia Lobova
- Vasiliy Mailov
- Ilya Medvedev
- Viktor Melantev
- Alexander Nikolaev
- Maxim Opalev
- Stepan Oshchepkov
- Anastasia Panchenko
- Mikhail Pavlov
- Aleksandra Perova
- Pavel Petrov
- Vladislav Polzounov
- Galina Poryvayeva
- Natalia Proskurina
- Anton Ryakhov
- Yuliana Salakhova
- Yevgeny Salakhov
- Irina Salomykova
- Anastasia Sergeeva
- Andrey Shchegolikhin
- Stephan Shevchuk
- Andrey Shkiotov
- Ivan Shtyl
- Tatyana Tischenko
- Anatoli Tishchenko
- Olga Tishchenko
- Andrey Tissin
- Yelena Tissina
- Denys Tourtchenkov
- Sergey Tsibuinikov
- Georgiy Tsybulnikov
- Sergey Ulegin
- Anton Vasilev
- Sergey Verlin
- Aleksandr Vinogradov
- Konstantin Vishnyakov
- Aleskey Volkinskiy
- Alexey Volkonsky
- Mikhail Zamotin
- Roman Zarubin
- Viktor Zavolskiy

== Cross-country skiing ==
- Ivan Alypov
- Nikolay Anikin
- Natalia Baranova-Masalkina
- Nikolay Bazhukov
- Yevgeny Belyayev
- Yuliya Chepalova
- Olga Danilova
- Yevgeny Dementyev
- Mikhail Devyatyarov
- Nina Gavrilyuk
- Mikhail Ivanov
- Irina Khazova
- Pavel Kolchin
- Natalya Korostelyova
- Nikita Kriukov
- Larisa Kurkina
- Vladimir Kuzin
- Larisa Lazutina
- Alexander Legkov
- Yevgeniya Medvedeva
- Nikolay Morilov
- Alexander Panzhinskiy
- Alexei Petukhov
- Vasily Rochev
- Alyona Sidko
- Fyodor Simashev
- Yuri Skobov
- Fyodor Terentyev
- Yelena Välbe
- Vyacheslav Vedenin
- Vladimir Voronkov
- Lyubov Yegorova
- Nikolay Zimyatov

== Curling ==
- Andrey Drozdov
- Nkeirouka Ezekh
- Margarita Fomina
- Ekaterina Galkina
- Jason Gunnlaugson
- Olga Jarkova
- Liudmila Privivkova
- Anna Sidorova
- Anastassia Skoultan

== Cycling ==
- Tamilla Abassova
- Viatcheslav Ekimov
- Oksana Grishina
- Eduard Gritsun
- Mikhail Iakovlev (born 2000), Russian-born Israeli
- Mikhail Ignatiev
- Irina Kalentieva
- Alexandr Kolobnev
- Nikolay Kuznetsov
- Alexei Markov
- Anton Shantyr
- Olga Slyusareva
- Olga Zabelinskaya
- Zulfiya Zabirova

== Darts ==
- Irina Armstrong
- Anastasia Dobromyslova

== Diving ==
- Inga Afonina
- Aleksandr Dobroskok
- Dmitriy Dobroskok
- Gleb Galperin
- Natalia Mikhaylovna Goncharova
- Vera Ilyina
- Yulia Koltunova
- Yuriy Kunakov
- Irina Lashko
- Igor Lukashin
- Yelena Miroshina
- Alexey Molchanov
- Yuliya Pakhalina
- Anastasia Pozdniakova
- Nadezhda Bazhina
- Dmitri Sautin
- Vladimir Timoshinin
- Aliaksandr Varlamau

== Draughts ==
- Alexander Baljakin
- Alexei Chizhov
- Alexander Georgiev
- Vladimir Kaplan
- Alex Moiseyev
- Rashid Nezhmetdinov
- Alexander Schwarzman
- Tamara Tansykkuzhina

== Electronic sports ==
- Ivan Demidov

== Equestrians ==
- Grand Duke Dmitri Pavlovich of Russia
- Vladimir Littauer
- Karol Rómmel

== Fencing ==
- Karina Aznavourian
- Sergey Bida
- Violetta Khrapina Bida
- Svetlana Boyko
- Inna Deriglazova
- Kamilla Gafurzianova
- Yelena Grishina
- Pavel Kolobkov
- Larisa Korobeynikova
- Nikolay Kovalev
- Yevgeniya Lamonova
- Tatiana Logounova
- Konstantin Lokhanov
- Maria Mazina
- Mark Midler
- Viktoria Nikishina
- Mark Rakita
- Yakov Rylsky
- Aida Shanayeva
- Sergey Sharikov
- Anna Sivkova
- David Tyshler
- Sofiya Velikaya
- Eduard Vinokurov
- Iosif Vitebskiy
- Aleksey Yakimenko
- Oksana Yermakova

== Field hockey ==
- Minneula Azizov
- Valeri Belyakov
- Viktor Deputatov
- Aleksandr Goncharov
- Aleksandr Gusev
- Sergei Klevtsov
- Viacheslav Lampeev
- Aleksandr Miasnikov
- Mikhail Nichepurenko
- Leonid Pavlovski
- Sergei Pleshakov
- Vladimir Pleshakov
- Tatyana Shvyganova
- Aleksandr Sychyov
- Galina Vyuzhanina
- Oleg Zagorodnev
- Farit Zigangirov

== Figure skating ==
- Ilia Averbukh
- Elena Bechke
- Ludmila Belousova
- Elena Berezhnaya
- Natalia Bestemianova
- Ekaterina Bobrova
- Andrei Bukin
- Maria Butyrskaya
- Marina Cherkasova
- Sergei Chetverukhin
- Artur Dmitriev
- Oksana Domnina
- Igor Eremenko
- Artur Gachinski
- Ekaterina Gordeeva
- Aleksandr Gorelik
- Aleksandr Gorshkov
- Sergei Grinkov
- Oksana Grishuk
- Elena Ilinykh
- Kira Ivanova
- Nikita Katsalapov
- Oksana Kazakova
- Fedor Klimov
- Marina Klimova
- Anjelika Krylova
- Ilia Kulik
- Roman Kostomarov
- Aliona Kostornaia
- Vladimir Kovalev
- Maxim Kovtun
- Natalia Linichuk
- Yulia Lipnitskaya
- Irina Lobacheva
- Oleg Makarov
- Maxim Marinin
- Andrei Minenkov
- Alexei Mishin
- Natalia Mishkutenok
- Irina Moiseeva
- Tamara Moskvina
- Tatiana Navka
- Oleg Ovsyannikov
- Lyudmila Pakhomova
- Nikolai Panin
- Denis Petrov
- Evgeni Platov
- Evgeni Plushenko
- Sergei Ponomarenko
- Oleg Protopopov
- Irina Rodnina
- Larisa Selezneva
- Maxim Shabalin
- Sergei Shakhrai
- Anna Shcherbakova
- Anton Sikhuralidze
- Irina Slutskaya
- Lyudmila Smirnova
- Elena Sokolova
- Dmitri Soloviev
- Adelina Sotnikova
- Ksenia Stolbova
- Andrei Suraikin
- Tatiana Totmianina
- Maxim Trankov
- Elizaveta Tuktamysheva
- Alexandra Trusova
- Alexei Ulanov
- Alexei Urmanov
- Maya Usova
- Kamila Valieva
- Elena Valova
- Oleg Vasiliev
- Viktoria Volchkova
- Tatiana Volosozhar
- Alexei Yagudin
- Alexander Zaitsev
- Tatyana Zhuk
- Alexander Zhulin

== Football (soccer) ==
- Igor Akinfeev
- Eugeny Aldonin
- Andrei Arshavin
- Aleksandr Deryomov (1949–2004)
- Alan Dzagoev
- Sergey Ignashevich
- Aleksandr Nikolayevich Martynov
- Erast Osipyan
- Roman Pavlyuchenko
- Andrei Suvorov (1887–1917)
- Lev Yashin
- Dmitri Zhdanov
- Yury Zhirkov
- Aleksandr Golovin
- Aleksei Miranchuk
- Denis Cheryshev
- Aleksandr Kerzhakov
- Artem Dzyuba
- Aleksandr Kokorin

== Freestyle skiing ==
- Marina Cherkasova
- Egor Korotkov
- Yelizaveta Kozhevnikova
- Vladimir Lebedev
- Dmitry Marushchak
- Daria Serova
- Sergey Shupletsov
- Alexandr Smyshlyaev

== Go ==
- Alexandre Dinerchtein
- Svetlana Shikshina

== Golf ==
- Svetlana Gounkina
- Maria Kostina
- Maria Verchenova

== Gymnastics ==
- Denis Ablyazin
- Ksenia Afanasyeva
- Nikolai Andrianov
- David Belyavskiy
- Aliya Mustafina
- Svetlana Khorkina
- Viktoria Komova
- Tatiana Nabieva
- Yelena Produnova
- Elena Zamolodchikova
- Evgenia Kanaeva
- Irina Tchachina
- Alina Kabaeva
- Daria Dmitrieva
- Yanina Batyrchina
- Yana Kudryavtseva
- Amina Zaripova
- Oxana Kostina
- Daria Kondakova
- Margarita Mamun
- Olga Kapranova
- Ksenia Dudkina
- Yelena Posevina
- Anastasia Nazarenko
- Alexei Nemov
- Emin Garibov
- Nikolai Kuksenkov
- Vera Sessina
- Galina Shugurova
- Yuri Titov
- Or Tokayev, Israeli Olympic rhythmic gymnast

== Handball ==
- Yekaterina Andryushina
- Irina Bliznova
- Mikhail Chipurin
- Yelena Dmitriyeva
- Dmitry Filippov
- Aleksandr Gorbatikov
- Vyacheslav Gorpishin
- Vitali Ivanov
- Anna Kareyeva
- Oleg Khodkov
- Eduard Koksharov
- Alexey Kostygov
- Denis Krivoshlykov
- Vasily Kudinov
- Oleg Kuleshov
- Stanislav Kulinchenko
- Dmitry Kuzelev
- Andrey Lavrov
- Igor Lavrov
- Yekaterina Marennikova
- Sergey Pogorelov
- Yelena Polenova
- Irina Poltoratskaya
- Lyudmila Postnova
- Alexey Rastvortsev
- Oxana Romenskaya
- Natalia Shipilova
- Maria Sidorova
- Pavel Sukosyan
- Inna Suslina
- Dmitri Torgovanov
- Aleksandr Tuchkin
- Emiliya Turey
- Yana Uskova
- Lev Voronin

== Ice hockey ==
- Maxim Afinogenov
- Alexei Badyukov
- Maria Batalova
- Ilya Bryzgalov
- Anton Bukhanko
- Pavel Bure
- Valeri Bure
- Pavel Datsyuk
- Vitaly Davydov
- Valeri Dydykin
- Sergei Fedorov
- Viacheslav Fetisov
- Irina Gashennikova
- Sergei Gonchar
- Denis Gurianov
- Alexei Gusarov
- Viktor Kalachik
- Valeri Kamensky
- Kirill Kaprizov
- Anton Kapotov
- Alexandra Kapustina
- Alexander Karpovtsev
- Alexei Kasatonov
- Darius Kasparaitis
- Nikolai Khabibulin
- Valeri Kharlamov
- Vladimir Konstantinov
- Ilya Kovalchuk
- Andrei Kovalenko
- Alexei Kovalev
- Vyacheslav Kozlov
- Igor Kravchuk
- Vladimir Krutov
- Andrei Kuteikin
- Igor Larionov
- Yekaterina Lebedeva
- Sergei Makarov
- Evgeni Malkin
- Aleksandr Maltsev
- Andrei Markov
- Boris Mironov
- Dmitri Mironov
- Boris Mikhailov
- Elina Mitrofanova
- Alexander Mogilny
- Alexander Mokshantsev
- Aleksey Morozov
- Evgeni Nabokov
- Sergei Nemchinov
- Andrei Nikolishin
- Sergei Olkhovtsev
- Alexander Ovechkin
- Maria Pechnikova
- Sergei Peretyagin
- Vladimir Vladimirovich Petrov
- Anna Prugova
- Alexander Radulov
- Sergei Samsonov
- Alexander Semin
- Anna Shibanova
- Evgeny Shtaiger
- Anna Shukina
- Yelena Silina
- Olga Sosina
- Andrei Svechnikov
- Valeria Tarakanova
- Anna Timofeyeva
- German Titov
- Vladislav Tretiak
- Oleg Tverdovsky
- Semyon Varlamov
- Alexei Yashin
- Anton Volchenkov
- Stepan Zhdanov
- Alexei Zhitnik
- Viktor Zinger
- Sergei Zubov

== Judo ==
- Lyubov Bruletova
- Tea Donguzashvili
- Arsen Galstyan
- Mansur Isaev
- Tagir Khaybulaev
- Vitali Kuznetsov
- Vladimir Nevzorov
- Serhiy Novikov
- Yelena Petrova
- Nikolai Solodukhin

== Martial arts ==
- Aleksander Emelianenko
- Aleksei Oleinik
- Alexander Volkov
- Andrey Koreshkov
- Askar Askarov
- Damir Ismagulov
- Fedor Emelianenko
- Islam Makhachev
- Khabib Nurmagomedov
- Magomed Ankalaev
- Movsar Evloev
- Petr Yan
- Sergei Kharitonov
- Sergei Pavlovich
- Shamil Abdurakhimov
- Tagir Ulanbekov
- Umar Nurmagomedov
- Usman Nurmagomedov
- Vadim Nemkov
- Valentin Moldavsky
- Yana Kunitskaya
- Zabit Magomedsharipov
- Zubaira Tukhugov

== Luge ==
- Denis Alimov
- Yuliya Anashkina
- Vladislav Antonov
- Yevgeny Belousov
- Aleksandr Belyakov
- Gennady Belyakov
- Vladimir Boitsov
- Sergey Danilin
- Albert Demtschenko
- Alexander Denisyev
- Valery Dudin
- Stepan Fedorov
- Irina Gubkina
- Tatiana Ivanova
- Yuri Kharchenko
- Dmitriy Khamkin
- Natalia Khoreva
- Viktor Kneib
- Semen Kolobayev
- Boris Kuryschkin
- Mikhail Kuzmich
- Pavel Kuzmich
- Yekaterina Lavrentyeva
- Ivan Lazarev
- Aleksey Lebedev
- Vladimir Makhnutin
- Stanislav Mikheev
- Roman Molvistov
- Ivan Nevmerzhitski
- Anastasia Oberstolz-Antonova
- Lyubov Panyutina
- Pyotr Popov
- Pavel Porzhnev
- Vladimir Prokhorov
- Alexandra Rodionova
- Kiril Serikov
- Anastasiya Skulkina
- Jury Talykh
- Jury Veselov
- Yuliya Vetlova
- Aleksandr Yegorov
- Vladislav Yuzhakov
- Aleksei Zelensky
- Alexandr Zubkov

== Nordic skiing ==
- Sergey Chervyakov
- Vyacheslav Dryagin
- Andrey Dundukov
- Alexey Fadeyev
- Ildar Garifullin
- Nikolay Gusakov
- Valeriy Kapaev
- Nikolay Kiselyov
- Valery Kobelev
- Dmitry Kochkin
- Allar Levandi
- Robert Makara
- Sergey Maslennikov
- Alexander Mayorov
- Niyaz Nabeev
- Nikolay Nogovitsyn
- Aleksandr Nossov
- Ivan Panin
- Nikolai Parfionov
- Alexander Prosvirnin
- Dmitry Sinitsyn
- Valeri Stolyarov

== Pentathlon ==
- Andrey Moiseyev
- Dmitri Svatkovskiy
- Eduard Zenovka

== Pool ==
- Anastasia Luppova
- Konstantin Stepanov

== Professional wrestling ==
- Salman Hashimikov
- Alex Koslov
- Ivan Markov
- Victor Zangiev
- Alexander Zass

== Racing ==
- Sergey Afanasyev
- Mikhail Aleshin
- Aleksei Dudukalo
- Nikolai Fomenko
- Lev Fridman
- Misha Goikhberg
- Boris Ivanowski
- Dimitri Jorjadze
- Alessandro Vita Kouzkin
- Sergei Krylov
- Daniil Kvyat
- Kirill Ladygin
- Ivan Lukashevich
- Alexander Lvov
- Viktor Maslov
- Nikita Mazepin
- Sergey Mokshantsev
- Daniil Move
- Anton Nebylitskiy
- Vitaly Petrov, Formula 1 driver
- Andrei Romanov
- Roman Rusinov
- Timur Sadredinov
- Ivan Samarin
- Viktor Shapovalov
- David Sigachev
- Sergey Sirotkin
- Andrey Smetsky
- Max Snegirev
- Konstantin Tereshchenko
- Igor Troubetzkoy
- Alexander Tyuryumin
- Alexey Vasilyev
- Evgeny Zelenov
- Maxim Zimin
- Sergei Zlobin

== Rally ==
- Vladimir Chagin
- Firdaus Kabirov
- Eduard Nikolaev
- Evgeny Novikov
- Leonid Novitskiy

== Rowing ==
- Aleksandr Berkutov
- Valentin Boreyko
- Boris Dubrovskiy
- Vladimir Eshinov
- Sergey Fedorovtsev
- Oleg Golovanov
- Yelena Khloptseva
- Aleksandr Klepikov
- Gennadi Korshikov
- Igor Kravtsov
- Mikhail Kuznetsov
- Aleksandr Lukyanov
- Nikolay Ivanov
- Vyacheslav Ivanov
- Yury Malyshev
- Anatoliy Sass
- Nikolay Spinyov
- Aleksey Svirin
- Aleksandr Timoshinin
- Yuriy Tyukalov
- Oleg Tyurin

== Rugby league ==
- Robert Campbell
- Andrei Olari
- Sam Obst
- Ian Rubin

== Rugby union ==
- Vasily Artemiev
- Igor Galinovskiy
- B.P. Gavrilov
- Kirill Kulemin
- Alexander Obolensky
- Alexandre Tichonov

== Shooting ==
- Yevgeni Aleinikov
- Sergei Alifirenko
- Alexei Alipov
- Boris Andreyev
- Harry Blau
- Antoli Bogdanov
- Vasily Borisov
- Yevgeny Cherkasov
- Valentina Cherkasova
- Svetlana Demina
- Yuri Fedkin
- Lyubov Galkina
- Irina Gerasimenok
- Tatiana Goldobina
- Vladimir Isakov
- Artem Khadjibekov
- Boris Kokorev
- Grigory Kosykh
- Olga Kuznetsova
- Marina Logvinenko
- Vasily Mosin
- Mikhail Nestruyev
- Natalia Paderina
- Yevgeni Petrov
- Sergei Polyakov
- Sergei Pyzhianov
- Viktor Shamburkin
- Renart Suleymanov
- Viktor Torshin
- Viktor Vlasov
- Aleksandr Zabelin

== Short track speed skating ==
- Viktor Ahn
- Yuliya Allagulova
- Tatiana Borodulina
- Semion Elistratov
- Vladimir Grigorev
- Natalya Isakova
- Viktoriya Troytskaya
- Yuliya Vlasova
- Ruslan Zakharov

== Skeleton ==
- Konstantin Aladachvili
- Sergey Chudinov
- Olga Korobkina
- Yekaterina Mironova
- Elena Nikitina
- Aleksandr Tretyakov
- Svetlana Trunova
- Yelena Yudina

== Ski jumping ==
- Irina Avvakumova
- Vladimir Belussov
- Ildar Fatchullin
- Dimitry Ipatov
- Nikolay Kamenskiy
- Pavel Karelin
- Arthur Khamidulin
- Valery Kobelev
- Denis Kornilov
- Ilya Rosliakov
- Roman Sergeevich Trofimov
- Dimitry Vassiliev

== Snowboarding ==
- Svetlana Boldykova
- Stanislav Detkov
- Yekaterina Ilyukhina
- Nikolay Olyunin
- Yuri Podladchikov
- Andrey Sobolev
- Yekaterina Tudegesheva
- Vic Wild
- Alena Zavarzina

== Speed skating ==
- Yekaterina Abramova
- Tatyana Averina
- Varvara Barysheva
- Svetlana Bazhanova
- Oleg Bozhev
- Natalya Donchenko
- Dmitry Dorofeyev
- Olga Fatkulina
- Svetlana Fedotkina
- Sergey Fokichev
- Natalya Glebova
- Olga Graf
- Yevgeny Grishin
- Aleksandr Golubev
- Rafayel Grach
- Nikolay Gulyayev
- Klara Guseva
- Sergey Khlebnikov
- Sergey Klevchenya
- Berta Kolokoltseva
- Viktor Kosichkin
- Vera Krasnova
- Yevgeny Kulikov
- Galina Likhachova
- Yekaterina Lobysheva
- Vladimir Lobanov
- Igor Malkov
- Yuri Mikhaylov
- Valery Muratov
- Vladimir Orlov
- Natalya Petrusyova
- Tamara Rylova
- Yekaterina Shikhova
- Tatyana Sidorova
- Boris Shilkov
- Lidiya Skoblikova
- Ivan Skobrev
- Yuliya Skokova
- Boris Stenin
- Valentina Stenina
- Galina Stepanskaya
- Lyudmila Titova
- Svetlana Vysokova
- Irina Yegorova
- Svetlana Zhurova

== Sumo ==
- Aran Hakutora
- Hakurozan Yūta
- Alan Karaev
- Rohō Yukio
- Wakanohō Toshinori

== Swimming ==
- Sergey Fesikov
- Andrey Grechin
- Larisa Ilchenko
- Danila Izotov
- Stanislava Komarova
- Sergey Koplyakov
- Andrey Korneyev
- Yevgeny Korotyshkin
- Marina Kosheveya
- Vladislav Kulikov
- Yevgeny Lagunov
- Nikita Lobintsev
- Vladimir Morozov
- Denis Pankratov
- Mikhail Polischuk
- Igor Polyansky
- Alexander Popov
- Yevgeny Sadovyi
- Vladimir Salnikov
- Roman Sludnov
- Alexander Sukhorukov
- Arkady Vyatchanin
- Yuliya Yefimova
- Anastasia Zuyeva

== Synchronized swimming ==
- Yelena Antonova
- Yelena Azarova
- Olga Brusnikina
- Anastasia Davydova
- Mariya Gromova
- Natalia Ishchenko
- Elvira Khasyanova
- Mariya Kiselyova
- Olga Kuzhela
- Olga Novokshchenova
- Yelena Ovchinnikova
- Irina Pershina
- Svetlana Romashina
- Olga Sedakova
- Anna Shorina
- Yelena Soya
- Yuliya Vasilyeva
- Olga Vasyukova
- Anastasiya Yermakova

== Table tennis ==
- Fliura Abbate-Bulatova
- Oksana Fadeyeva
- Tatiana Ferdman
- Svetlana Ganina
- Stanislav Gomozkov
- Svetlana Grinberg
- Irina Kotikhina
- Dmitry Mazunov
- Rita Pogosova
- Valentina Popova
- Zoja Rudnova
- Alexey Smirnov
- Elena Timina

== Taekwondo ==
- Anastasia Baryshnikova
- Aleksey Denisenko
- Natalia Ivanova
- Olga Ivanova

== Tennis ==
- Elena Bovina
- Andrei Cherkasov
- Elena Dementieva
- Natela Dzalamidze, took on Georgian citizenship
- Yevgeny Kafelnikov
- Maria Kirilenko
- Anna Kournikova
- Svetlana Kuznetsova
- Elena Likhovtseva
- Ekaterina Makarova
- Eugenia Maniokova
- Daniil Medvedev
- Olga Morozova
- Anastasia Myskina
- Andrei Olhovskiy
- Nadia Petrova
- Dinara Safina
- Marat Safin
- Maria Sharapova
- Vera Zvonareva
- Elena Vesnina

== Triathlon ==
- Irina Abysova
- Alena Adanichkina
- Nina Valentinovna Anisimova
- Alexander Bryukhankov
- Olga Dmitrieva
- Olga Erofeeva
- Olga Generalova
- Lyubov Ivanovskaya
- Vyacheslav Pimenov
- Anastasiya Polyanskaya
- Dmitry Polyanski
- Igor Andreyevich Polyanski
- Anastasia Protasenya
- Alexandra Razarenova
- Natalia Shliakhtenko
- Mikhail Shubin
- Arina Shulgina
- Yevgeniya Sukhoruchenkova
- Igor Sysoyev
- Ivan Vasiliev

== Volleyball ==
- Nikolay Apalikov
- Yevgeniya Artamonova
- Yury Berezhko
- Aleksandr Butko
- Yekaterina Gamova
- Yelena Godina
- Sergey Grankin
- Tatyana Gracheva
- Dmitriy Ilinikh
- Vadim Khamuttskikh
- Taras Khtey
- Olga Khrzhanovskaya
- Anastasiya Kodirova
- Inessa Korkmaz
- Aleksandra Korukovets
- Maxim Mikhaylov
- Natalya Morozova
- Dmitriy Muserskiy
- Olga Nikolaeva
- Aleksey Obmochaev
- Yelena Plotnikova
- Olga Potachova
- Natalya Safronova
- Marina Sheshenina
- Aleksandr Sokolov
- Lioubov Sokolova
- Irina Tebenikhina
- Sergey Tetyukhin
- Elizaveta Tishchenko
- Yelena Tyurina
- Yelena Vasilevskaya
- Aleksandr Volkov

== Water polo ==
- Anatoli Akimov
- Marina Akobiya
- Ekaterina Anikeeva
- Aleksandr Dolgushin
- Aleksandr Dreval
- Yevgeny Grishin
- Vadim Gulyaev
- Mikhail Ivanov
- Aleksandr Kabanov
- Sofia Konukh
- Maria Koroleva
- Natalia Kutuzova
- Svetlana Kuzina
- Leonid Osipov
- Tatiana Petrova
- Yuliya Petrova
- Galina Rytova
- Yevgeny Sharonov
- Aleksandr Shidlovsky
- Elena Smurova
- Viacheslav Sobchenko
- Elena Tokun
- Irina Tolkunova
- Ekaterina Vasilieva

== Weightlifting ==
- Dmitry Berestov
- Andrei Chemerkin
- Zarema Kasayeva
- Tatiana Kashirina
- Aleksei Petrov
- Valentina Popova
- Marina Shainova
- Oksana Slivenko
- Svetlana Tsarukayeva
- Nadezhda Yevstyukhina
- Natalia Zabolotnaya

== Wrestling ==
- Islambek Albiev
- Mavlet Batirov
- Vadim Bogiyev
- Khasan Baroyev
- Khadjimourat Gatsalov
- Murat Kardanov
- Aleksandr Karelin
- Alan Khugayev
- Aslanbek Khushtov
- Khadzhimurad Magomedov
- Nazyr Mankiev
- Aleksey Mishin
- Shirvani Muradov
- Sagid Murtazaliev
- David Musuľbes
- Djamal Otarsultanov
- Adam Saitiev
- Buvaisar Saitiev
- Varteres Samourgachev
- Artem Surkov
- Murad Umakhanov
- Roman Vlasov
- Natalia Vorobieva
- Abdulrashid Sadulaev

== Yacht racing ==
- Andrey Balashov
- Alexandr Budnikov
- Boris Budnikov
- Aleksandr Muzychenko
- Timir Pinegin
- Eugene Platon
- Nikolay Polyakov
- Viktor Potapov
- Dmitri Shabanov
- Georgy Shayduko
- Fyodor Shutkov
- Igor Skalin
- Eduard Skornyakov
- Philipp Strauch
