= Zhdanov, Armenia =

Zhdanov, Armenia may refer to:

- Zhdanov, Armavir
- Zhdanov, Lori

== See also ==
- Zhdanov (disambiguation)
