= Zhdanov (surname) =

Zhdanov (Russian: Жданов) or Zhdanova (feminine; Жданова) is a patronymic surname derived from the pre-Christian Slavic given name Zhdan (Ждан). Notable people with the surname include:

- Andrei Zhdanov (1896–1948), Stalinist politician, developer of the Zhdanov Doctrine that governed Soviet cultural activities for a number of years
- Aleksei Zhdanov, Russian footballer
- Andrei Zhdanov, Russian footballer
- Alexander Zhdanov (1858–?), Russian astronomer
- Alexandr Zhdanov, Russian avant-garde painter
- Dimitri Zhdanov, Russian racing cyclist
- Dmitri Zhdanov, Russian footballer
- Igor Zhdanov (1920–1996), Latvian chess master
- Ihor Zhdanov (born 1967), Ukrainian politician and businessman. 3rd Minister of Youth and Sports of Ukraine
- Ilya Zhdanov, Russian Badminton player
- Ivan Zhdanov (born 1988), Russian politician and lawyer, director of the Anti-Corruption Foundation
- Leonid Zhdanov (1890–?), Russian selectionist
- Leonid Zhdanov (1927–2009), Russian ballet dancer, teacher and photographer, younger brother of Yury Zhdanov
- Lev Zhdanov (1864–?), Russian novelist and playwright
- Oleksandr Zhdanov, Ukrainian footballer
- Roman Zhdanov, Russian paralympic swimmer
- Stepan Zhdanov (born 1989), Russian ice hockey player
- Vasily Zhdanov (born 1963), Soviet cyclist
- Victor M. Zhdanov (1914–1987), Russian virologist, instrumental in the push for global smallpox eradication
- Vladimir Zhdanov (1902–1964), Soviet army officer and Hero of the Soviet Union
- Yevgeny Zhdanov (1839–1892), Russian land surveyor and cartographer
- Yuri Zhdanov (1919–2006), Russian chemist, rector of Rostov State University from 1957 to 1988; son of Andrei Zhdanov and former husband of Svetlana Alliluyeva
- Yury Zhdanov (dancer) (1925–1986), Russian ballet dancer, teacher, artist and choreographer, brother of Leonid Zhdanov
