= Sazonov =

Sazonov or Sozonov (Russian: Сазонов, Созонов) and Sazonova or Sozonova (Russian: Сазонова, Созонова; feminine) is a common Russian surname derived from the baptismal name Sazon.

People with this surname include:

- Aleksei Sazonov, Russian footballer
- Alexander Sazonov, Russian ice hockey player
- Daniel Sazonov, Finnish politician
- Evgeny Sazonov, Russian theater director, teacher and artistic director
- Igor Sazonov, Russian terrorist
- Irina Sazonova, Russian-born Icelandic artistic gymnast
- Ivan Sazonov, Russian lieutenant general and nobleman
- Ivan Sozonov, Russian badminton player
- Maksim Sazonov, Russian footballer
- Maya Sazonova, Kazakhstani race walker
- Mikhail Sazonov, Russian bodybuilder and powerlifter
- Nadezhda Sozonova, Russian rugby sevens player
- Nikolai Sazonov, Russian stage actor
- Nina Sazonova, Russian actress
- Saba Sazonov, Russian footballer
- Sergey Sazonov, Russian statesman and diplomat
  - Sazonov–Paléologue Agreement
- Vasily Sazonov, a Russian painter
- Viktoriya Sazonova, Kazakhstani ice hockey player
- Vladislav Sozonov, Russian rugby union player
- Vyacheslav Sazonov, a Soviet mathematician who proved Sazonov's theorem
- Yegor Sazonov, Russian revolutionary
- Yulia Sazonova, Russian-born writer, theater critic and historian, actress, and puppeteer

== See also ==
- Sazonov, Volgograd Oblast, Russia
