= Anashkin =

Anashkin (Russian: Ана́шкин), female form Anashkina (Russian: Ана́шкина) is a Russian surname. Notable people with the surname include:

- Mikhail Anashkin (1901–1951), Soviet general
- Sergei Anashkin (born 1961), Kazakhstani football player
- Yuliya Anashkina (born 1980), Russian luger
