= Zhdanovsk =

Zhdanovsk may refer to:

- Zhdanovsk, name of the city of Beylagan, Azerbaijan, until 1991
- Zhdanovsk, name of the town of Zapolyarny, Murmansk Oblast, Russia, in 1956–1963

== See also ==
- Zhdanov (disambiguation)
