= Aladashvili =

Aladashvili (Georgian: ალადაშვილი) is a Georgian surname. Notable people with the surname include:

- Kakhaber Aladashvili (born 1983), Georgian footballer
- Konstantin Aladashvili (born 1977), Georgian bobsledder and skeleton racer
