= Zhdanov (disambiguation) =

Andrei Zhdanov (1896–1948) was a Soviet politician.

Zhdanov may also refer to:

- Zhdanov (surname), a surname (including a list of people with the name)

== Places ==
- Zhdanov, Ukraine, name from 1948 until 1989 for Mariupol, a city and sea port
  - Zhdanov Shipyard, Ukraine former name of Azov ship-repair factory, Mariupol
- Zhdanov, Armavir, former name of Mayisyan, Armenia
- Zhdanov, Lori, a town in Lori Province, Armenia
- Zhadanov, former name of Beylagan (city), Azerbaijan
- Zhdanov Shipyard, Russia, former name of Severnaya Verf, Saint Petersburg

== Other uses ==
- Soviet cruiser Zhdanov, a Soviet Sverdlov-class cruiser

== See also ==
- Zhdanov Doctrine, Soviet cultural doctrine developed named for Andrei Zhdanov
- Zhdanovsk, Russia, former name of Zapolyarny, Murmansk Oblast
- Zhdanovka River, Saint Petersburg, Russia
- Zhdanivska coal mine, a coal mine in the south-east of Ukraine
- Zhdanovsky Island, a peninsula on Karelian Isthmus
- Zhdanovskaya (Moscow Metro), former name of Vykhino station
- Zhdanovskaya line, former name of Tagansko-Krasnopresnenskaya line, Moscow Metro
