= Nureyev (ballet) =

Ballet by Ilya Demutsky

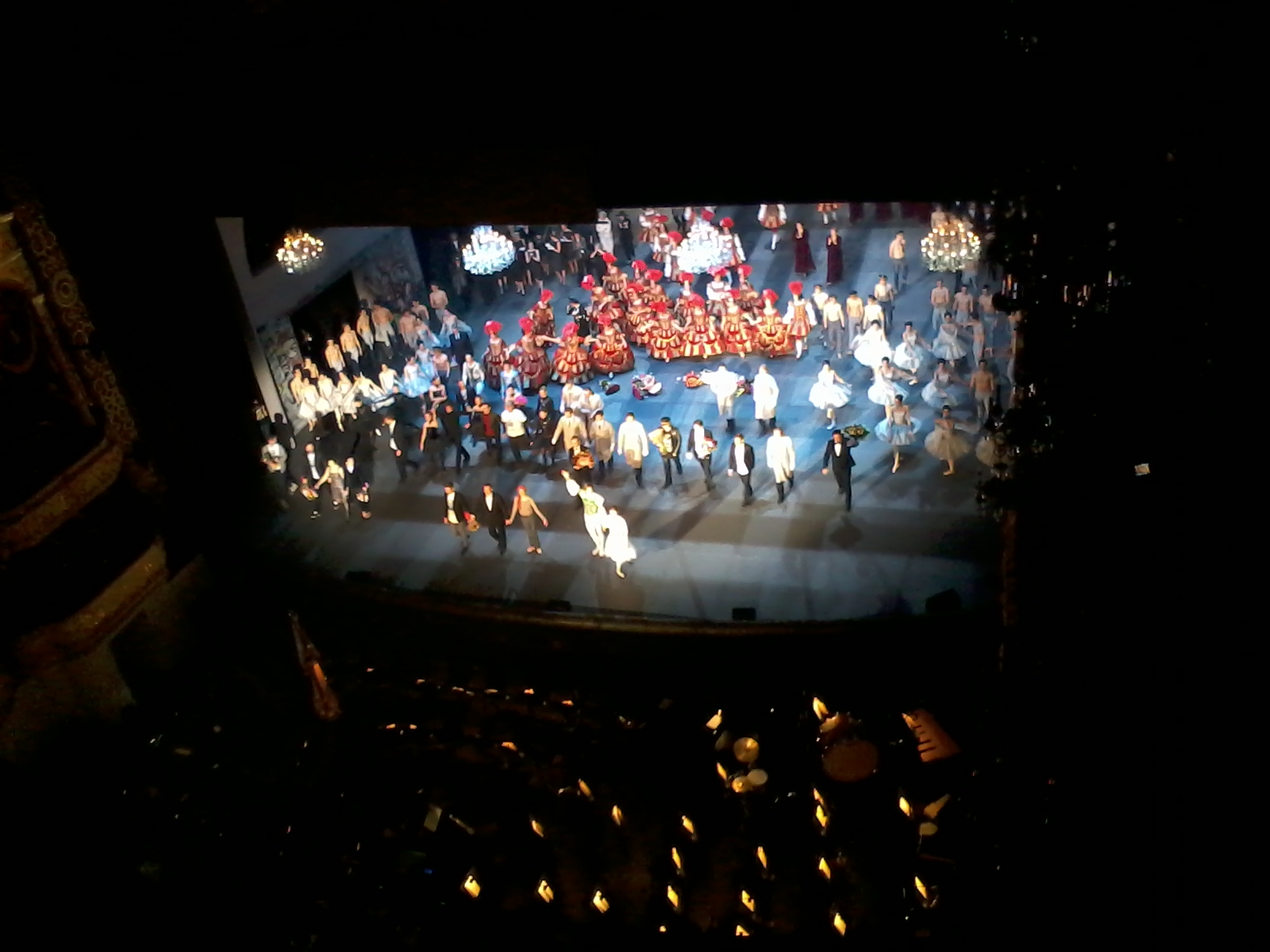
The end of the first performance on 9 December 2017

Nureyev (Russian: Нуреев) is a ballet choreographed by Kirill Serebrennikov and Yuri Posokhov with a score by Ilya Demutsky. The premiere of Nureyev took place at the Historical Scene of the Bolshoi Theatre on 9 December 2017.

The scope of this ballet based on the biography of ballet dancer Rudolf Nureyev who was born in the Soviet Union and then escaped from his native country.

== Background ==
Kirill Serebrennikov and Yuri Posokhov created their second ballet performance. The first one was A Hero of Our Time in 2015.

The Bolshoi Theatre added Nureyev to the repertoire of the 241st season (2016/17). A premiere was planned on 11 July 2017. The music score and libretto were completed in the winter.

A general rehearsal took place in the Bolshoi Theatre in July. Then, the director of the theatre Vladimir Urin stated that a premiere of Nureyev cancelled. Vladimir Medinsky called the performance as gay propaganda and newspapers stated it as the main reason of the cancellation. In the addition, Kirill Serebrennikov was accused of embezzlement of 68 million roubles.

In September 2017 a new date, 9 December, of a premiere was named. Tickets for the first performance of Nureyev were on sale on 18 November.

9 December 2017 the premiere of Nureyev took place at the Historical Scene of the Bolshoi Theatre, starring Vladislav Lantratov as Rudolf Nureyev.

== Original interpreters ==
The first interpreters (9 December 2017) state below:

Role		Performers
Rudolf Nureyev	Ballet dancer	Vladislav Lantratov
Auctioneer / Avedon / The Grey Man	Vocal	Igor Vernik
A Letter to Rudi. The Pupil	Ballet dancer	Vyacheslav Lopatin
A Letter to Rudi. The Diva	Ballet dancer	Svetlana Zakharova
The Ballerina	Ballet dancer	Anastasia Stashkevich
Erik	Ballet dancer	Denis Savin
Margot	Ballet dancer	Maria Alexandrova
The Porter / The Wind	Mezzo-soprano	Svetlana Shilova
The Intendant	Tenor	Marat Gali
The singer of the king	Countertenor	Vadim Volkov
Ballet Teacher	Ballet dancer	Victor Barykin
Conductor		Anton Grishanin
