= Vladislav Lantratov =

Russian ballet dancer

- Владислав Валерьевич Лантратов
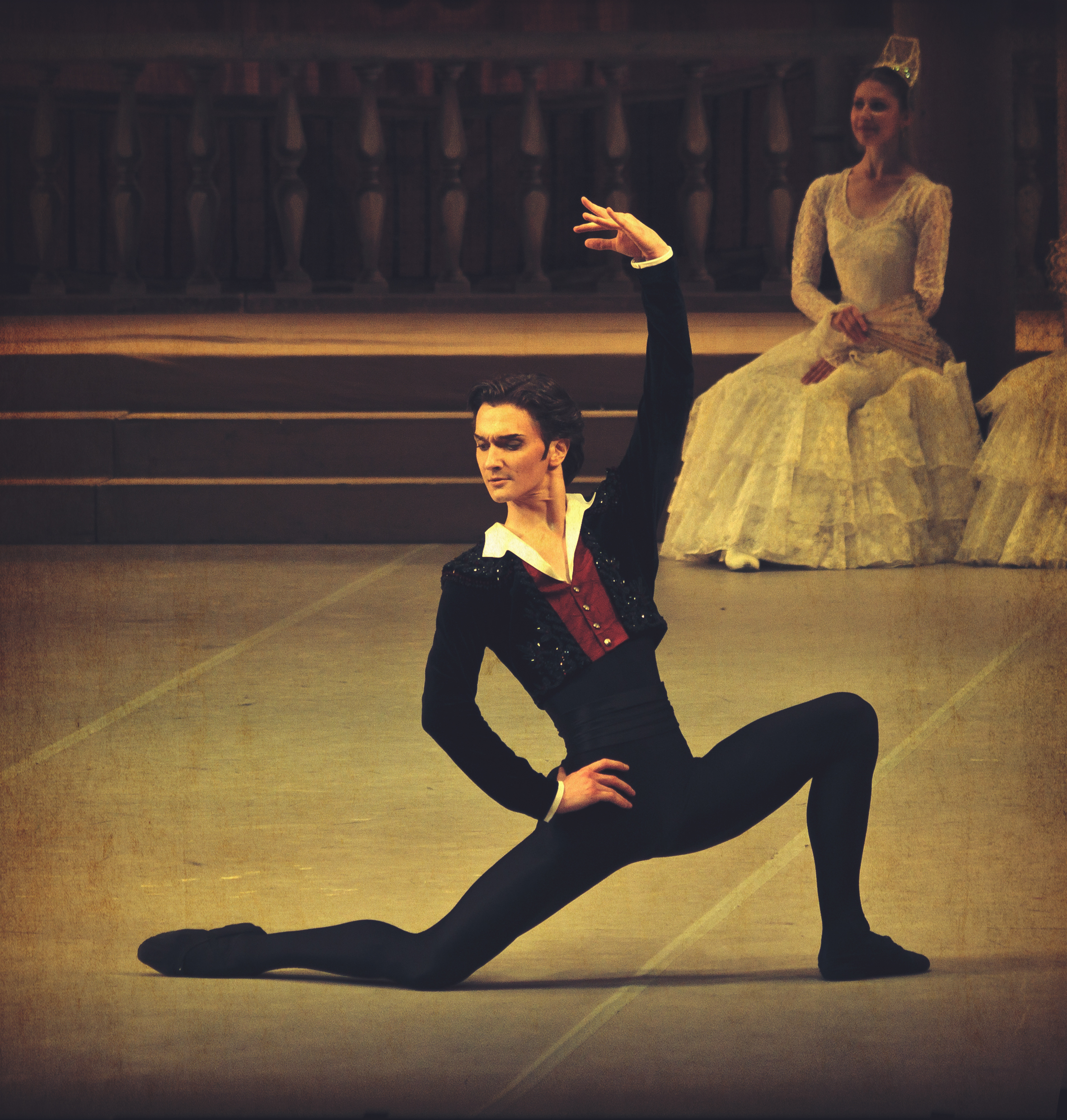
- Vladislav Lantratov as Basilio in Don Quixote, Bolshoi Theater, 2011
- Born: Vladislav Valerievich Lantratov; 8 October 1988 (age 37); Moscow, USSR
- Occupation: Ballet dancer
- Employer: Bolshoi Theatre

Vladislav Lantratov (Russian: Владислав Валерьевич Лантратов; born 8 October 1988) is a Russian principal dancer in the Bolshoi Ballet.

== Early life ==
Lantratov was born in Moscow, Russia to a family of ballet dancers. He graduated from the Moscow Choreographic Academy in 2006, where he had studied under Leonid Zhdanov and then Ilya Kuznetsov, and joined the Bolshoi Ballet in the same year.

== Career ==
In 2006 Lantratov performed in the grand pas in Raymonda, and in the same year danced in Carmen Suite and The Nutcracker. In 2007 he performed in Swan Lake and in 2008 in Yuri Grigorovich's Legend of Love. During the same year, he was in the first cast of Alexei Ratmansky's Russian Seasons at the Bolshoi (performing as one of the Pair in Blue).

In 2009, Lantratov performed as the Ballet Dancer in Ratmansky's The Bright Stream. The same year he learned the parts of the Evil Genius in Swan Lake and Florent in La Esmeralda. The following year, he performed for the first time in Romeo and Juliet as Count Paris and appeared in performances of Sleeping Beauty as Prince Fortune and the Blue Bird.

In 2011, Lantratov performed a number of leading roles for the first time, including Lucien in Ratmansky's Lost Illusions, the Nutcracker Prince in Yuri Grigorovich's Nutcracker, and Basilio in Don Quixote. During 2011, Lantratov also danced in a gala concert in honor of Galina Ulanova in London. He has performed in the first Bolshoi casts of many ballets, including Wayne McGregor's Chroma, George Balanchine's Jewels and Yuri Possokhov's Classical Symphony. In 2013, he was chosen to be the first dancer to perform the role of Eugene Onegin at the Bolshoi Theater in John Cranko's Onegin. In 2014, Lantratov created the role of Petruchio in Jean-Christophe Maillot's Taming of the Shrew.

Vladislav Lantratov performed the starring role in Nureyev at the premiere on 9 December 2017.

== Awards ==
- 2018 : Prix Benois de la Danse
