= Dmitry Gudanov =

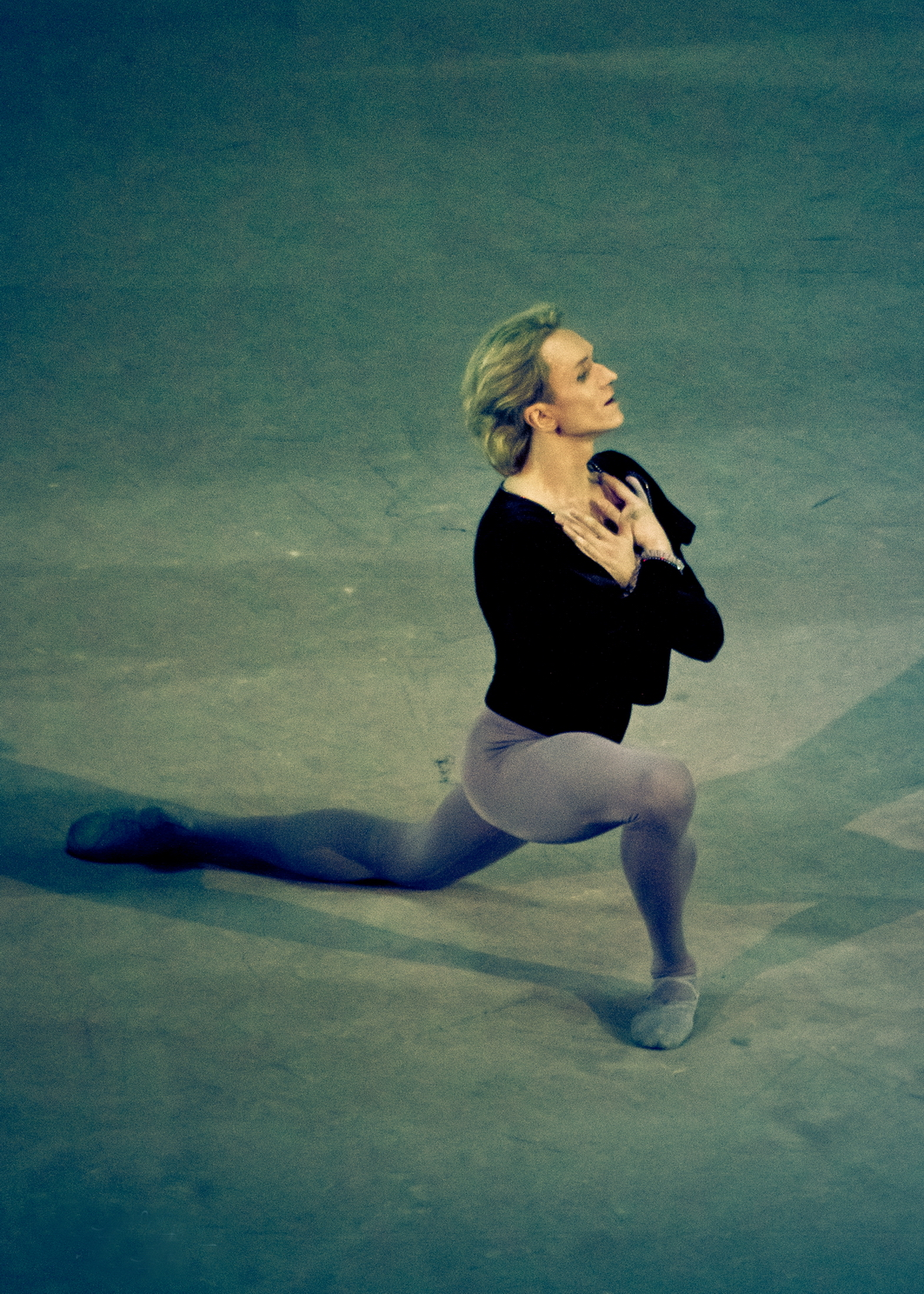
- Dmitry Gudanov as Albrecht in "Giselle", Bolshoi Theatre, 21 January 2011
- Born: Дмитрий Константинович Гуданов; July 9, 1975 (age 51); Moscow, USSR
- Education: Moscow State Academy of Choreography
- Occupation: Principal dancer
- Employer: Bolshoi Theatre
- Awards: Meritorious Artist of Russia (2005), People's Artist of Russia (2012)

Dmitry Konstantinovich Gudanov (Russian: Дмитрий Константинович Гуданов; born July 9, 1975) is a People's Artist of Russia and principal dancer of Bolshoi Ballet. He retired from the Bolshoi in July 2017.

== Early life and awards ==
Gudanov was born on 9 July 1975 in Moscow, Russia. From 1985 to 1994 he attended Moscow Academic Choreography College, a class of Leonid Zhdanov, from which he graduated by 1994. After that, he joined Bolshoi Ballet and performed in his first act as one of the boys in the La Sylphide and in 1995 played a role of a male French doll in the Nutcracker. In 1996 he won a Danse Noble prize at the Permian Open Competition for Russian Ballet Dancers and in 1998 received a gold medal at the International Competition for Ballet Dancers in Paris.

== Career ==
In 1999 he appeared in a play called Romeo and Juliet as Mercutio and the same year have been seen as Count Albrecht in Giselle. Also the same year, he played a role of James in La Sylphide a play in which he performed five years earlier and was awarded Moscow Debuts Festival prize. In 2000 he reprised his role in the Nutcracker as a Nutcracker-Prince and the same year was awarded Soul of Dance prize from the Ballet. In 2002 he played a role of Colas in the La Fille mal gardee and in 2003 he participated at one of the Notre Dame de Paris operas where he played a role of Claude Frollo. From 1998 to 2002 he played many solo acts and in 1999 was awarded the Moscow Debuts Festival prize for one of his solo roles.

During the same 2002 and later 2003 he played a prince in the Nutcracker with Yelena Andrienko being his partner and with assistance of Canadian Ballet. The same year he appeared in Chopiniana which was performed in Kazan at the Rudolph Nureyev International Festival of Classical Ballet.

His solo acts were finished for some time, till 2007. In between those years, he appeared as Prince Desire in the Sleeping Beauty, Hermann in the Queen of Spades, and Prince Siegfried in the Swan Lake all which he played in one year of 2004. In 2005, Gudanov was awarded Merited Artist of the Russian Federation award and the same year appeared in both as a miller in the Le Tricorne and Basilio in Don Quixote. In 2006, he appeared in a play called Cinderella as a lovely Prince and the same year played as Solor in the La Bayadère. In 2007, he performed an act of a teacher in the Lesson and two years later appeared as Phoebus in Esmeralda.

== See also ==
- List of Russian ballet dancers
