= Aleksei Zelensky =

Russian luger (born 1971)

Aleksei Zelensky (born 7 March 1971) is a Russian luger who competed in the early 1990s.

== Career ==
Competing in two Winter Olympics, he earned his best finish of seventh in the men's doubles event at Lillehammer in 1994. Aleksei Zelensky has also performed in the 2006 film The Island as the young Tikhon.

== See also ==
- List of Russian sportspeople
