= Viktor Kalachik =

Russian ice hockey player (born 1981)

- Born: 28 February 1981 (age 44)
- Position: Forward
- KHL team: Avtomobilist Yekaterinburg

Viktor Kalachik (born 28 February 1981) is a Russian professional ice hockey forward who currently plays for Avtomobilist Yekaterinburg of the Kontinental Hockey League (KHL).
