= Yelena Panova (bodybuilder) =

Russian bodybuilder (born 1979)

Elena Panova
- Professional bodybuilder
- Elena Panova 2008 Championship

Personal info
- Born: April 26, 1979 (age 47); Voronezh, Russia

Best statistics
- Height: 5 ft 4 in (1.63 m)
- Weight: (In Season) 136-138 lb (Off-Season) 174-176 lb

Professional (Pro) career
- Pro-debut: FBFR Southern Russia Third Championship; 2003
- Best win: WFF-WBBF World Pro Championship - 2nd place; 2007, 2008
- Active: Since 2003

Yelena Aleksandrovna Panova, often spelled Elena Panova, (Russian: Елена Александровна Панова; born April 26, 1979) is a female bodybuilder from Voronezh, Russia

== Background ==
Elena graduated from the Voronezh State Technical University with a master's degree in Public Relations. She began training to lose weight in 1998. Generally it was step aerobics at that time. Elena decided to become a bodybuilder after attending a local bodybuilding contest where she got a very good impression of the competitors. She was also inspired by the magazines with well-known female bodybuilders as Lenda Murray, Cory Everson and Juliette Bergmann on their covers. In 2004 Elena changed her career and became a personal trainer. In winter 2006 Elena moved to Moscow and worked there at one of the leading fitness center.. In 2009 Elena moves to Miami (Florida, US) and lives there up to the present moment. Married, no children.

== Bodybuilding career ==
In 2003 Elena competed in her first contest FBFR Southern Russia Third Championship "Samson 22", finishing in sixth place. In 2004 Panova suffered a car crash injury and was not able to train and compete for a year. In 2005, she took second place at the WFF-WBBF Russia Amateur Championship. In 2006 Elena earned her professional status at WFF-WBBF Europe Pro Championship, finishing in fourth place. Her greatest success as a professional has been the second place at the WFF-WBBF World Pro Championship 2007 and 2008.

After 2009 WFF-WBBF Pro World Championships Elena Panova holds fourth position in World Professional Ranking List (Women).

== Contest history ==
- 2003 FBFR Southern Russia Third Championship "Samson 22" - 6th
- 2005 WFF-WBBF Russia Amateur Championship - 2nd.
- 2006 WFF-WBBF Europe Amateur Championship – 2nd.
- 2006 WFF-WBBF Europe Pro Championship - 4th
- 2007 WFF-WBBF Europe Pro Championship - 2nd.
- 2007 WFF-WBBF World Amateur Championship - 1st.
- 2007 WFF-WBBF World Pro Championship - 2nd.
- 2008 WFF-WBBF World Pro Championship - 2nd.
- 2011 NPC FL Gold Cup November 12 - Women Overall - 1st, Women Heavyweight - 1st, Women Masters Overall - 1st, Women Masters 30+ - 1st.
