= Robert Makara =

Soviet Nordic combined skier

Robert Makara Russian: Роберт Макара); born January 27, 1948) was a Soviet Nordic combined skier who competed in the late 1960s. At the 1968 Winter Olympics in Grenoble, he finished seventh in the Nordic combined event.
