= David Sigachev =

Russian race car driver (born 1989)

- Nationality: Russian
- Born: 6 January 1989 (age 37) Moscow (Soviet Union)

Porsche Carrera Cup Germany career
- Debut season: 2009
- Current team: Seyffarth Motorsport
- Starts: 18
- Wins: 0
- Poles: 0
- Fastest laps: 0
- Best finish: 13th in 2009

Previous series
- 2010 2009 2007 2007: ADAC GT Masters; Porsche Supercup; Formula Renault 2.0 NEC; Eurocup Formula Renault 2.0

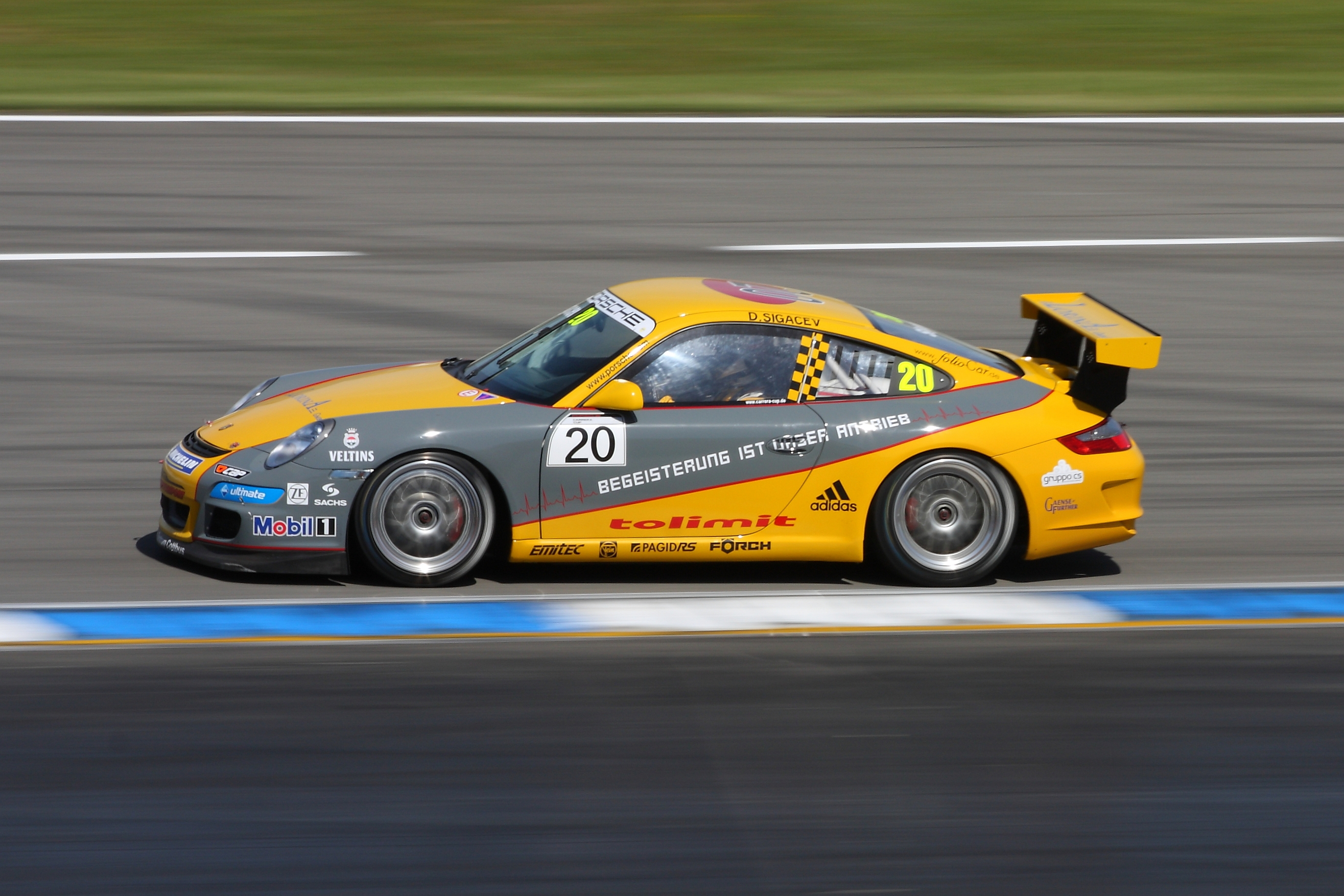
David Sigachev driving a Porsche racing car at Hockenheim Ring

David Sigachev (Russian: Дави́д Сигачёв, IPA: [dɐˈvʲɪt sʲɪgəˈtɕɵf], also transliterated Sigacev, born 6 January 1989 in Moscow) is a Russian former race car driver who was based in Germany.

== Career ==
Sigachev started his racing career from karting. He made the move into single-seaters in 2007, with a campaign in the inaugural Formula Renault 2.0 Northern European Cup. Driving for SL Formula Racing, he finished 21st in the standings. He also took part in two Eurocup Formula Renault 2.0 races with the same team, failing to score a point. Sigachev missed the entire 2008 season due to sponsorship problems. In 2009, he moved to Porsche Supercup category with tolimit Seyffarth Motorsport.

== Racing record ==
=== Career summary ===
Season	Series	Team name	Races	Wins	Poles	F/Laps	Podiums	Points	Final Placing
2007	Formula Renault 2.0 NEC	SL Formula Racing	16	0	0	0	0	67	21st
2007	Eurocup Formula Renault 2.0	SL Formula Racing	2	0	0	0	0	N/A	NC†
2009	Porsche Carrera Cup Germany	tolimit Seyffarth Motorsport	9	0	0	0	0	38	13th
2009	Porsche Supercup	tolimit Seyffarth Motorsport	2	0	0	0	0	N/A	NC†
2010	Porsche Carrera Cup Germany	Seyffarth Motorsport	9	0	0	0	0	42	14th
2010	ADAC GT Masters	Seyffarth Motorsport	6	0	0	0	0	N/A	NC†

† - As Sigachev was a guest driver, he was ineligible to score points.

=== Complete Formula Renault 2.0 NEC results ===
(key) (Races in bold indicate pole position) (Races in italics indicate fastest lap)

Year	Entrant	1	2	3	4	5	6	7	8	9	10	11	12	13	14	15	16	DC	Points
2007	SL Formula Racing	ZAN; 1 Ret	ZAN; 2; 16	OSC; 1 Ret	OSC; 2; 13	ASS; 1; 24†	ASS; 2; 15	ZOL; 1; 12	ZOL; 1 Ret	NUR; 1; 20	NUR; 2; 16	OSC; 1; 17	OSC; 2; 10	SPA; 1; 21	SPA; 2; 19	HOC; 1; 16	HOC; 2; 10	21st	67

=== Complete Eurocup Formula Renault 2.0 results ===
(key) (Races in bold indicate pole position; races in italics indicate fastest lap)

Year	Entrant	1	2	3	4	5	6	7	8	9	10	11	12	13	14	DC	Points
2007	SL Formula Racing	ZOL; 1	ZOL; 2	NÜR; 1; 21	NÜR; 2; 26	HUN; 1	HUN; 2	DON; 1	DON; 2	MAG; 1	MAG; 2	EST; 1	EST; 2	CAT; 1	CAT; 2	41st	0

=== Complete Porsche Supercup results ===
(key) (Races in bold indicate pole position) (Races in italics indicate fastest lap)

Year	Team	1	2	3	4	5	6	7	8	9	10	11	12	13	DC	Points
2009	tolimit Seyffarth Motorsport	BHR1	BHR2	ESP1	MON	TUR	GBR	GER; 12	HUN; 12	ESP2	BEL	ITA	UAE1	UAE2	NC	0
