= Vladimir Boitsov =

Russian luger (born 1985)

Vladimir Sergeyevich Boitsov (Russian: Владимир Серге́евич Бойцов; born September 13, 1985, in Chusovoy, Perm Krai, Russian SFSR) is a Russian luger who has competed since 2002. He competed in the men's doubles event at the 2006 Winter Olympics in Turin, but crashed during the first run and did not finish.

Boitsov finished 16th in the men's doubles event at the 2006 FIL European Luge Championships in Winterberg, Germany.
