= Kiril Serikov =

Russian luger (born 1982)

Kiril Nikolayevich Serikov (Russian: Кирилл Николаевич Сериков, born June 13, 1982) is a Russian luger who has competed since 2001. He finished 24th in the men's singles event at the 2006 Winter Olympics in Turin.

Serikov's best finish at the FIL World Luge Championships was 26th in the men's singles event at Igls in 2007.
