= Nikolay Durakov =

Soviet bandy player (1934–2024)

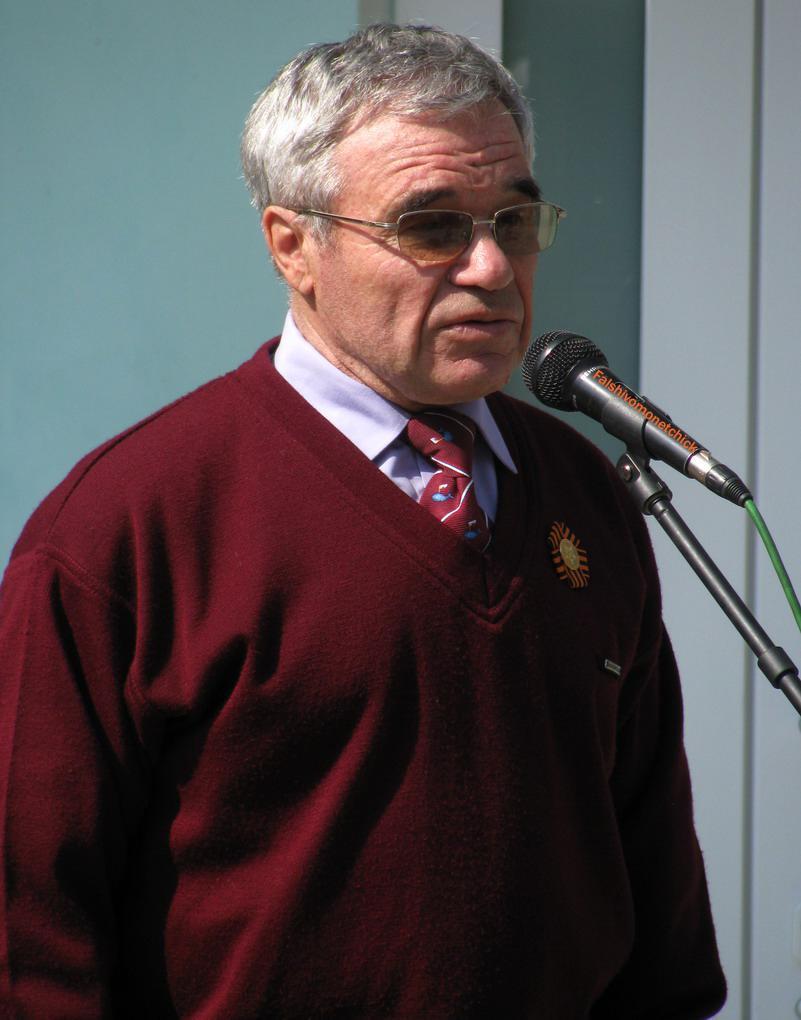
- Durakov in 2010

Personal information
- Full name: Nikolay Aleksandrovich Durakov
- Born: 5 December 1934 Krasnogorovka, Stalino Oblast, Ukrainian SSR, USSR
- Died: 9 March 2024 (aged 89) Yekaterinburg, Russia

Senior career*
Years	Team	Apps^{†}	(Gls)^{†}
1954–1976	SKA-Sverdlovsk		
- * Senior club appearances and goals counted for the domestic league only. † Appearances (Goals).

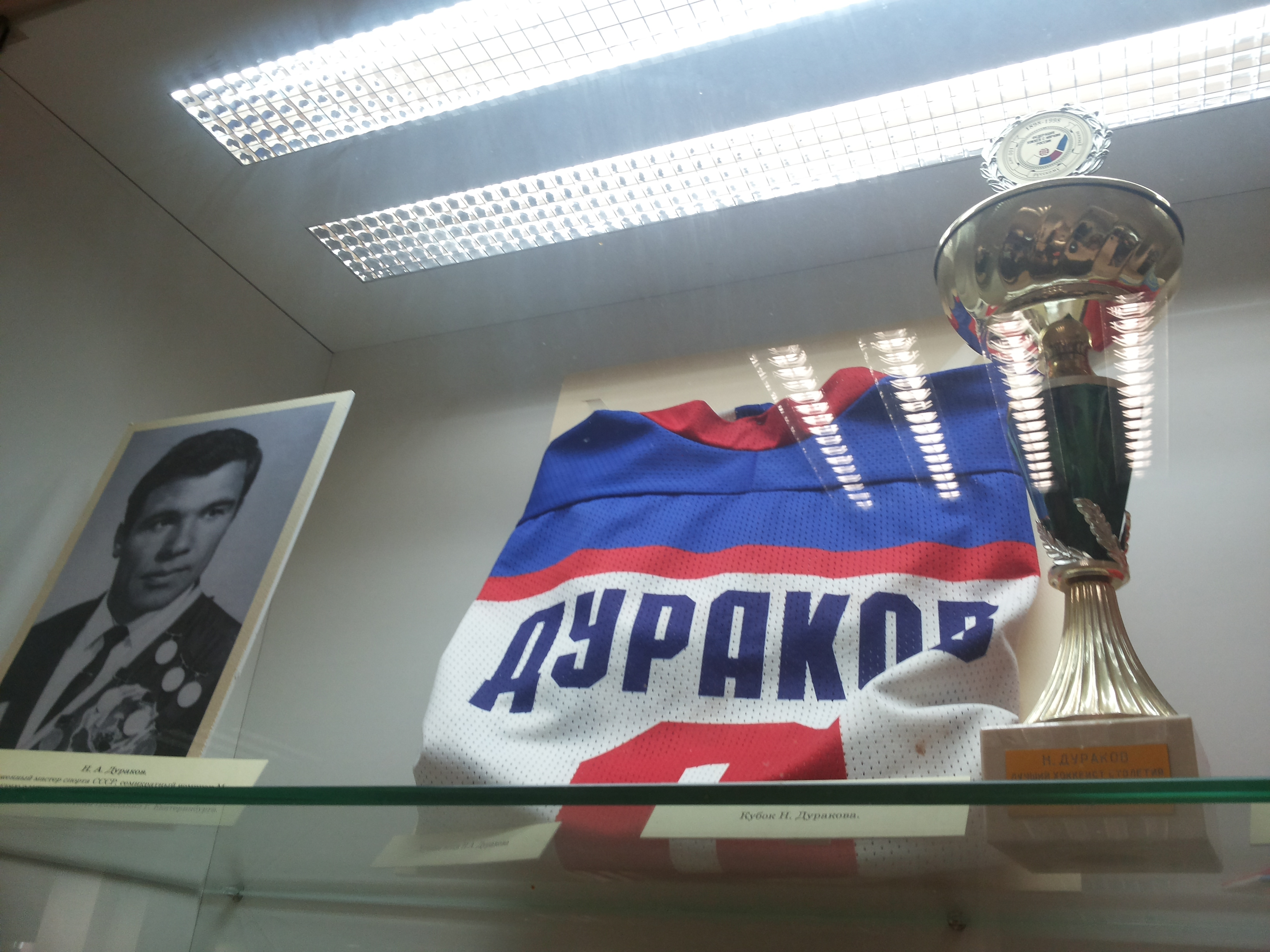

Nikolay Aleksandrovich Durakov (Russian: Николай Александрович Дураков; 5 December 1934 – 9 March 2024) was a Soviet bandy player from SKA-Sverdlovsk.

== Career and death ==
He was a seven times world champion. Durakov died on 9 March 2024, at the age of 89.

== Honours ==
=== Club ===
SKA-Sverdlovsk

- Soviet Champions (9): 1956, 1958, 1959, 1960, 1962, 1966, 1968, 1971, 1974.
- European Cup (1): 1973–74.

=== Country ===
Soviet Union

- Bandy World Championship: 1957, 1963, 1965, 1967, 1969, 1971, 1973
