= Vyacheslav Pimenov =

Russian triathlete

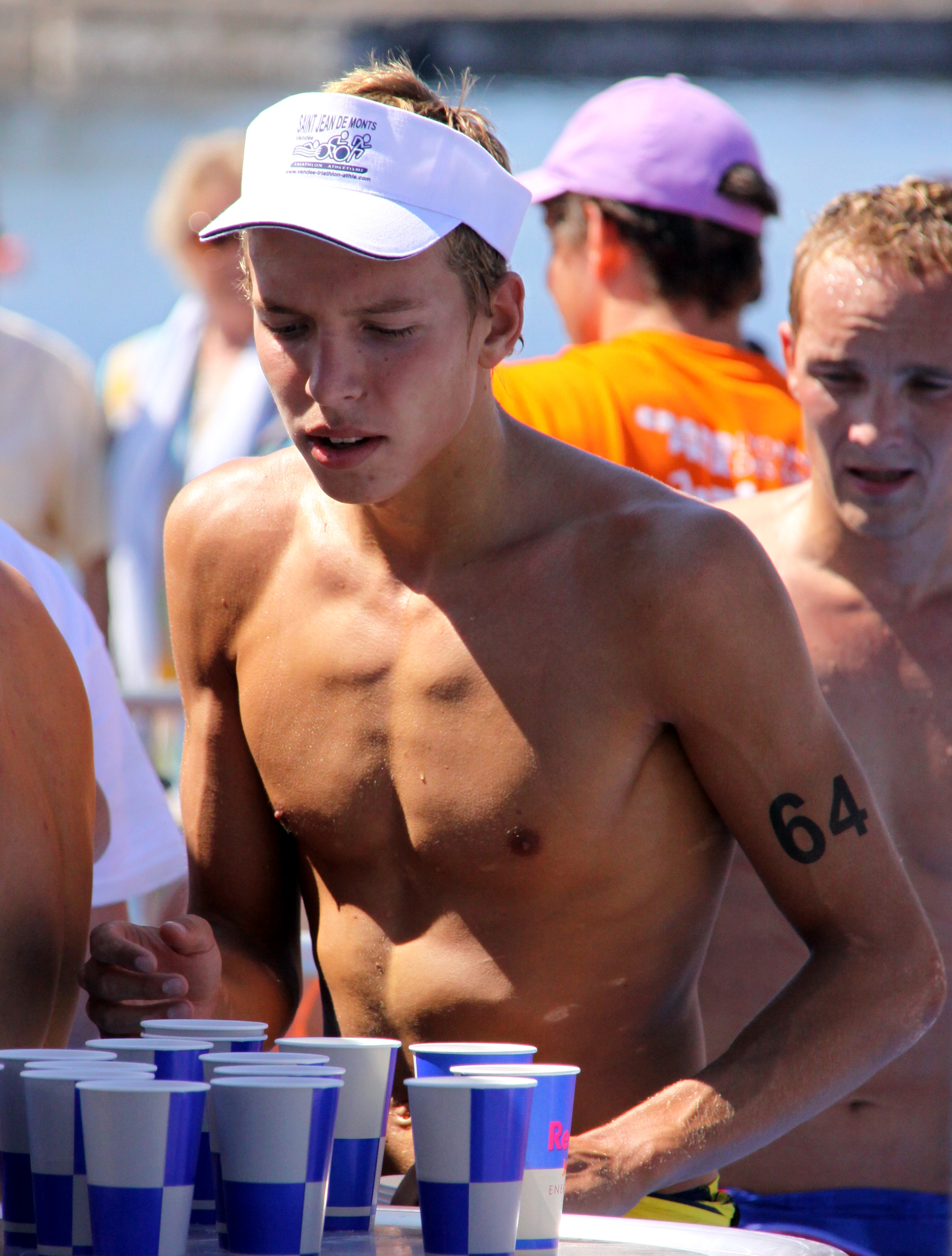
Vyacheslav Pimenov at the Triathlon de Dunkerque, 2010.

Vyacheslav Igorevich Pimenov (Russian: Вячеслав Игоревич Пименов; born 1 March 1991 in Moscow) is a Russian professional triathlete, 2010 Junior Champion and permanent member of the Russian National Team.

In 2010, Vyacheslav Pimenov took part in the French Club Championship Series Lyonnaise des Eaux, representing the club St. Jean de Monts Vendee Tri Athletisme. At the first triathlon of this French circuit, i.e. at the Triathlon de Dunkerque on 23 May 2010, Vyacheslav Pimenov placed 39th and still was the third best triathlete of his club (Ivan Tutukin, Russia: 24th, Alfred Torok, Hungary: 32nd), thus being among the three triathlètes classants l'equipe. Incidentally, St. Jean de Monts Vendee, like many French D1 clubs, depends almost exclusively on foreign elite stars.

At the Triathlon de Paris (18 July 2010) Pimenov placed 30th (best of his club), at Tourangeaux (29 August 2010) 45th (3rd of his club), and at the Grand Final in La Baule (18 September 2010) he placed 56th (last of his club).

== ITU Competitions ==
In the three years from 2008 to 2010, Pimenov took part in 8 ITU competitions and achieved 6 top ten positions. In 2011 he changed to the Elite category. The following list is based upon the official ITU rankings and the Athlete's Profile Page. Unless indicated otherwise, the following competitions are triathlons (Olympic Distance) and refer to the Elite category.

Date	Competition	Place	Rank
2008-09-06	European Cup (Junior)	Pulpí	7
2008-10-26	European Cup (Junior)	Alanya	5
2009-07-02	European Championships (Junior)	Holten	23
2009-08-08	European Cup (Junior)	Tiszaújváros	2
2010-07-03	European Championships (Junior)	Athlone	3
2010-08-01	European Cup (Junior)	Tabor	3
2010-09-08	Dextro Energy World Championship Series, Grand Final: Junior World Championships	Budapest	12
2010-10-24	European Cup (Junior)	Alanya	4
2011-04-03	European Cup	Antalya	43
2011-07-03	European Cup	Penza	15
