= Sergei Olkhovtsev =

Russian ice hockey player

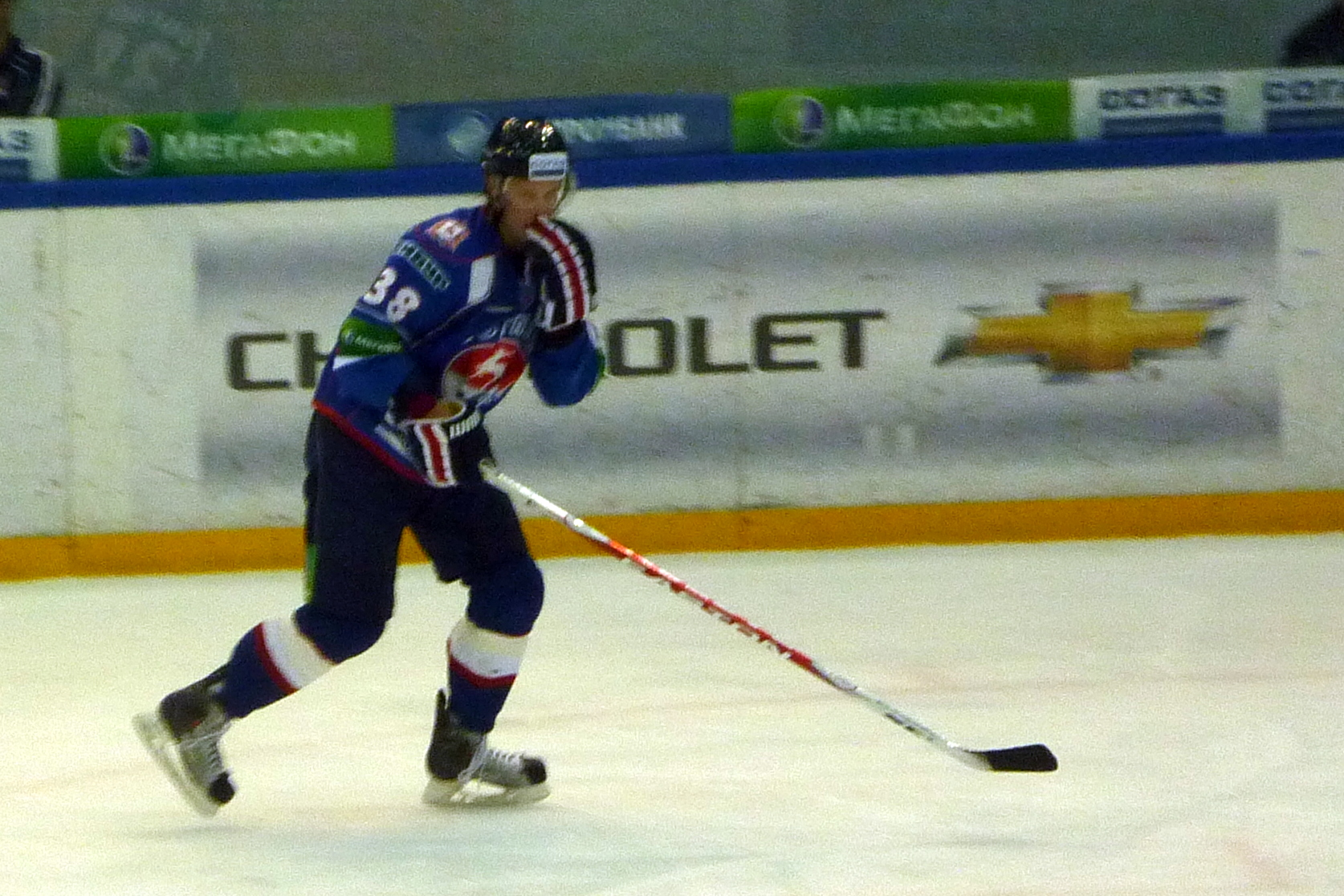
- Born: October 19, 1987 (age 37); Moscow, Russian SFSR, Soviet Union
- Height: 6 ft 0 in (183 cm)
- Weight: 187 lb (85 kg; 13 st 5 lb)
- Position: Defense
- Shot: Left
- Played for: Torpedo Nizhny Novgorod
- NHL draft: Undrafted
- Playing career: 2003–2014

Sergei Olkhovtsev (born October 19, 1987) is a former Russian professional ice hockey player who played one season in the Kontinental Hockey League (KHL) for Torpedo Nizhny Novgorod.
