= Sergei Anashkin =

Kazakhstani footballer (1961–2022)

Personal information
- Full name: Sergei Aleksandrovich Anashkin
- Date of birth: 12 April 1961
- Place of birth: Soviet Union
- Date of death: 1 February 2022 (aged 60)
- Height: 1.85 m (6 ft 1 in)
- Position: Defender

Senior career*
Years	Team	Apps	(Gls)
1979–1983	Kolkozchi Ashkhabad		
1984–1989	Daugava Rīga	190	(0)
1990	Olimpia Liepāja	27	(0)
1991	Uralmash Ekaterinburg	19	(0)
1992–1993	Kairat	48	(0)

International career
1992	Kazakhstan	4	(0)
- * Club domestic league appearances and goals

Sergei Anashkin (12 April 1961 – 1 February 2022) was a Kazakhstani footballer who played as a defender.

== Career ==
Anashkin began his career with Kolkozchi Ashkhabad, before spending several seasons with Daugava Rīga in the Soviet First League and finishing his career with FC Kairat.

He made four appearances for the Kazakhstan national team in 1992.

== Personal life and death ==
Anashkin died on 1 February 2022, at the age of 60.
