= Olga Erofeeva =

Russian triathlete

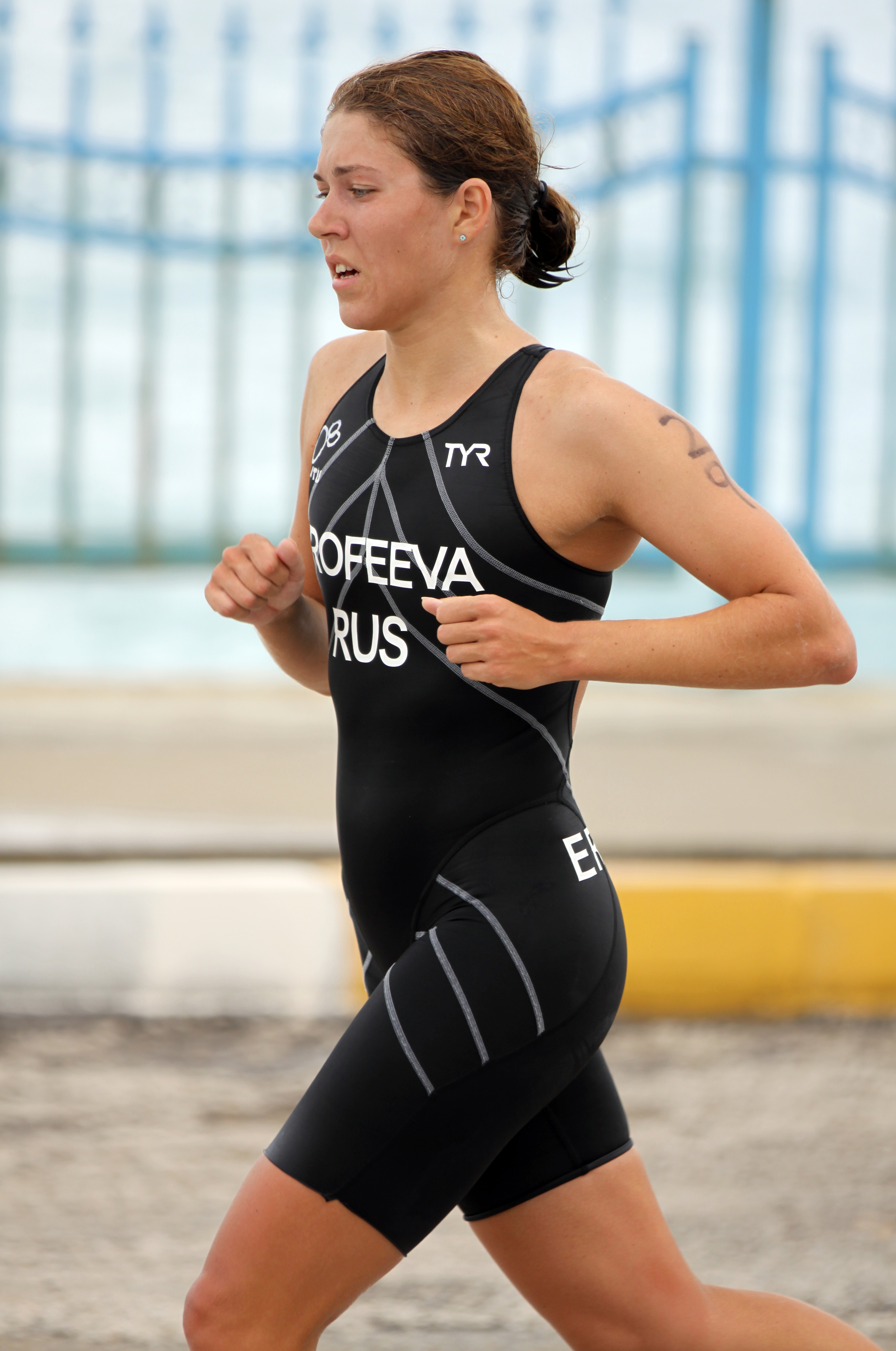
- Olga Erofeeva, best female Russian triathlete at the European Cup triathlon in Antalya, 2011.

Personal information
- Nationality: Russian
- Born: 1985 (age 40–41)

Sport
- Country: Russia
- Sport: Triathlon

Olga Erofeeva (Russian: Ольга Ерофеева; born 1985) is a Russian professional triathlete, 2011 National Elite Duathlon Champion, and National Aquathlon Vice-Champion of 2011.

In the Russian Ranking for 2010, which is based upon various national and international events, Erofeeva's name is among the top twenty female triathletes although Erofeeva did not attend any of the Russian competitions and her result is due to the only ITU event of 2010 she took part in.

In April 2011, Erofeeva had her international breakthrough. At the Volkswagen Aldiana Triathlon (Small States of Europe Championship, 27 March 2011) in Cyprus, where the Russian elite triathletes had their training camp, she won the silver medal on the sprint distance.

Olga Erofeeva's name does not appear in any of the Russian Triathlon Federation's rankings for 2009 and she is not even a reserve member of the National Team.

== ITU Competitions ==
The following list is based upon the official ITU rankings and the ITU Athletes's Profile Page. Unless indicated otherwise, the following events are Olympic Distance Triathlons and refer to the Elite category.

Date	Competition	Place	Rank
2010-10-24	Premium European Cup	Alanya	20
2011-04-03	European Cup	Antalya	8
2011-06-26	Premium Asian Cup	Burabay	1
2011-07-03	European Cup	Penza	4
