= Alexander Mokshantsev =

Russian ice hockey player

- Born: June 5, 1974 (age 50); Penza, Soviet Union
- Height: 5 ft 10 in (178 cm)
- Weight: 176 lb (80 kg; 12 st 8 lb)
- Position: Defence
- Played for: Stroitel Karaganda; Kristall Saratov; Dizelist Penza
- NHL draft: Undrafted
- Playing career: 1994–2004

Aleksandr Aleksandrovich Mokshantsev (Russian: Александр Мокшанцев Александрович, 2 or 5 June 1974) is a Russian former professional ice hockey defenceman. At the Elite level Mokshantsev played for Stroitel Karaganda during the 1994-95 season, Kristall Saratov during the 1995-96 season, and for Dizelist Penza between 1996 and 1998.

His son, also named Aleksandr Aleksandrovich Mokshantev (born February 17, 1995), is a hockey player who was drafted in the 4th round (107th overall) of the 2012 KHL Junior Draft by Lokomotiv Yaroslavl.
