= Valeri Dydykin =

Russian ice hockey player (born 1986)

- Born: March 4, 1986 (age 39); Chelyabinsk, Soviet Union
- Height: 6 ft 0 in (183 cm)
- Weight: 187 lb (85 kg; 13 st 5 lb)
- Position: Defence
- Shoots: Left
- KHL team Former teams: HC Donbass; Traktor Chelyabinsk; HC Lada Togliatti; Metallurg Novokuznetsk
- NHL draft: Undrafted
- Playing career: 2006–present

Valeri Dydykin (born March 4, 1986) is a Russian professional ice hockey defenceman. He is currently playing with HC Donbass in the Kontinental Hockey League (KHL).

Dydykin played three seasons in the Kontinental Hockey League, most recently playing with Metallurg Novokuznetsk during the 2010–11 KHL season.
