= Konstantin Nerchenko =

Russian bodybuilder (born 1985)

- Professional bodybuilder

Personal info
- Nickname: Kostya
- Born: 1985 (age 40–41); Russia

Best statistics

Professional (Pro) career
- Best win: Moscow Oblast Championships; 2009

Konstantin "Kostya" Nerchenko (Russian: Константин Нерченко; born 1985) is a Russian bodybuilder, powerlifter, strongman, master of Sambo, and personal trainer.

== Biography ==
As a teenager, he was training in various athletic and combat sports. Nerchenko is a super-heavyweight bodybuilder, his weight is approx. 100 kilograms. His first bodybuilding competition, Moscow Oblast Championships, took place in October 2009 in Mytishchi. During the contest Nerchenko placed second in super-heavyweight category (100+ kg). The same month, at Saint Petersburg/Leningrad Oblast Championships, he placed seventh in 100+ kg category. Nerchenko contended in other tournaments, also in super-heavyweight category: at the 2009 Moscow City Championships he took the fifth place, and at the 2011 Moscow Cup he placed sixth. He is also a prize-winning powerlifter, a three-time champion of Moscow and the Moscow Oblast bench press championships.

Nerchenko lives in Moscow Oblast and works as a personal trainer at the pilates/fitness studio; he acquired first experiences in his profession in 2003. He is also a strongman, and a certified Master in Sports of Sambo. Muscles and Testosterone called Nerchenko "the most underrated person in athletic sports history".
