= Evgeny Shtaiger =

Russian ice hockey player

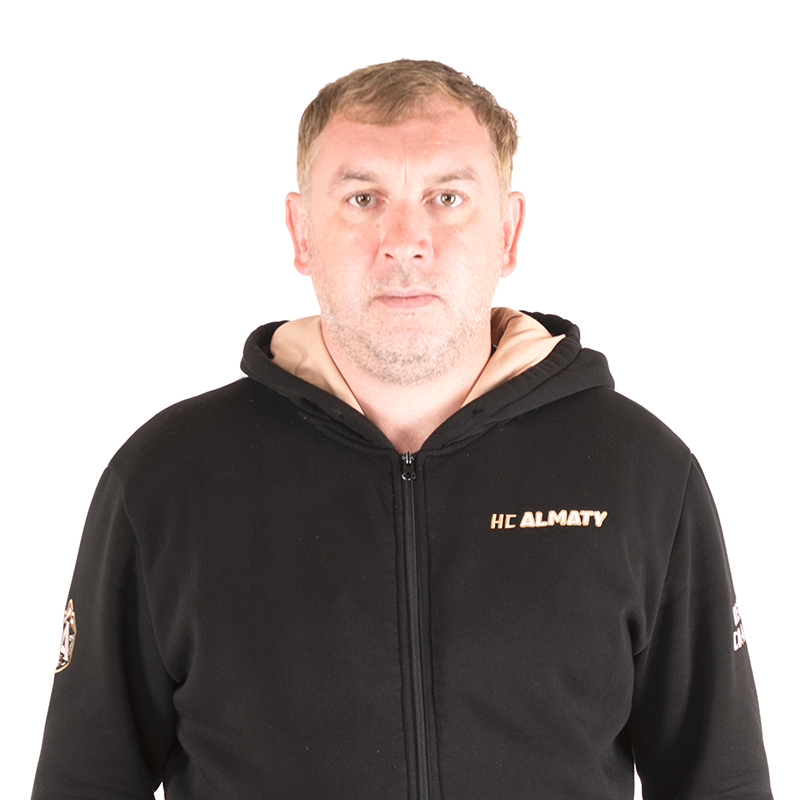
- Born: June 3, 1981 (age 44); Novokuznetsk, Russia
- Height: 6 ft 2 in (188 cm)
- Weight: 220 lb (100 kg; 15 st 10 lb)
- Position: Defence
- Shoots: Left
- Kazakhstan team Former teams: Beibarys Atyrau; Metallurg Novokuznetsk; SKA Saint Petersburg; Torpedo Nizhny Novgorod; HC Lada Togliatti; Traktor Chelyabinsk; HC Sibir Novosibirsk
- NHL draft: Undrafted
- Playing career: 2001–present

Evgeny Shtaiger (born June 3, 1981) is a Russian professional ice hockey defenceman. He is currently playing in Kazakhstan with Beibarys Atyrau.

Shtaiger made his Kontinental Hockey League debut playing with HC Lada Togliatti during the inaugural 2008–09 KHL season.
