= Aleksandr Deryomov =

Soviet footballer

Personal information
- Full name: Aleksandr Leonidovich Deryomov
- Date of birth: 28 October 1949
- Place of birth: Rostov Oblast, USSR
- Date of death: 2004 (aged 54–55)
- Position: Defender

Senior career*
Years	Team	Apps	(Gls)
1967–1968	Rostselmash Rostov-on-Don		
1970	Druzhba Maykop		
1971–1975	Zenit Leningrad	104	(3)
1976	Rostselmash Rostov-on-Don	30	(0)
1978	Spartak Ordzhonikidze	7	(0)

International career
1973	USSR	1	(0)

Managerial career
- 1988: Luch Azov (director)
- * Club domestic league appearances and goals

Aleksandr Leonidovich Deryomov (Russian: Александр Леонидович Дерёмов) (October 28, 1949 – 2004) was a Soviet football player. He was born in Rostov Oblast.

== International career ==
Deryomov played his only game for USSR on August 5, 1973, in a friendly against Sweden.
