= Andrei Suvorov =

Russian footballer

Personal information
- Full name: Andrei Kononovich Suvorov
- Date of birth: 1887
- Place of birth: Saint Petersburg, Russian Empire
- Date of death: 1917 (aged 29–30)
- Position: Striker

Senior career*
Years	Team	Apps	(Gls)
1911–1913	Sport Saint Petersburg		

International career
1912	Russia	1	(0)
- * Club domestic league appearances and goals

Andrei Kononovich Suvorov (Russian: Андрей Кононович Суворов) (1887–1917) was an association football player.

== International career ==
Suvorov played his only game for the Russia Empire on July 14, 1912, in a friendly against Hungary.
