= Leonid Zhdanov =

Russian dancer and photographer

Leonid Zhdanov (Russian: Леонид Тимофеевич Жданов; 1927–2009) was a Russian dancer and photographer. He was the younger brother of dancer Yury Zhdanov.

== Biography ==
Zhdanov was born on June 23, 1927, in Moscow, Russia. He was a pupil of Nikolai Tarasov at the Moscow Ballet School. Like his elder brother Yury, he joined the Bolshoi Theatre's ballet company after graduation. He participated in double roles with such principal dancers as Galina Ulanova, Raisa Struchkova, Maya Plisetskaya, Alicia Alonso, and many others. Later on, he came back to the Moscow Ballet School as a teacher of male classical dance and pas de deux. He mentored such dancers as Dmitry Gudanov and Andrei Fedotov. One of his last students was Vladislav Lantratov.

He also was a painter and a dance photographer. Inspired by Henri Cartier-Bresson, a French photographer, he kept a collection of 400,000 negatives of his ballet photos. A few books on ballet, including an album about art of Maya Plisetskaya and two albums about Moscow Ballet School based on his photographs were published.

He died on May 14, 2009.
