= Aleksandr Nossov =

Soviet Nordic combined skier

Aleksandr Nossov (Russian: Александр Александрович Носов; born February 20, 1942) was a Soviet Nordic combined skier who competed in the 1970s. He finished seventh in the Nordic combined event at the 1972 Winter Olympics in Sapporo. He was born in Perm.
