= Sazonov, Volgograd Oblast =

Sazonov Сазонов
- Khutor
- Location within Volgograd Oblast Location within Russia
- Coordinates: 47°58′N 43°16′E
- Country: Russia
- Region: Volgograd Oblast
- District: Kotelnikovsky District
- Time zone: UTC+4:00

Sazonov (Russian: Сазонов) is a rural locality (a khutor) in Generalovskoye Rural Settlement, Kotelnikovsky District, Volgograd Oblast, Russia. The population was 85 as of 2010.

== Geography ==
Sazonov is located on the left bank of the Aksay Yesaulovsky, 48 km northeast of Kotelnikovo (the district's administrative centre) by road. Novoaksaysky is the nearest rural locality.
