= Sergey Shelestov =

Russian bodybuilder

Sergey Shelestov Серге́й Ше́лестов
- Professional bodybuilder
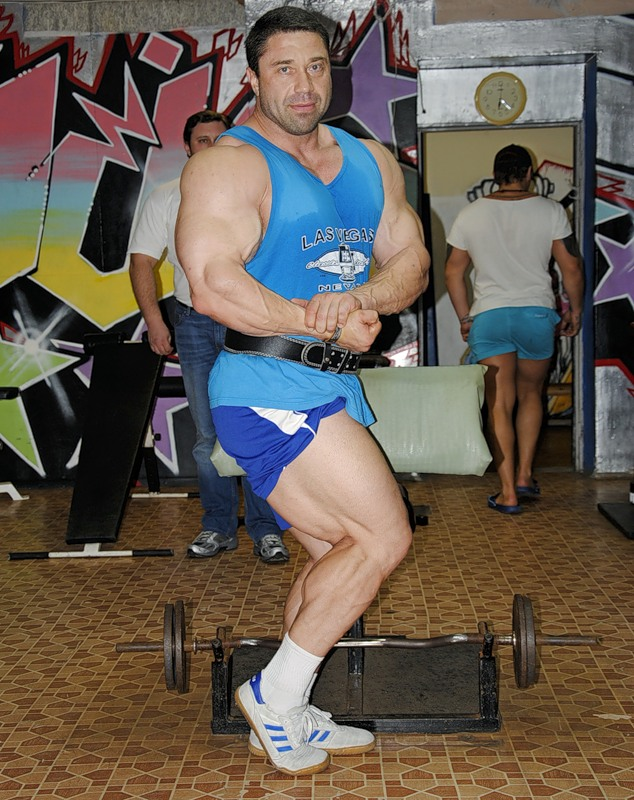
- Shelestov preparing for the Arnold Classic competition in 2009.

Personal info
- Nickname: Moscow Monster
- Born: May 25, 1971 (age 55); Talovaya, Russian SFSR, USSR

Best statistics
- Height: 5 ft 11 in (180 cm)
- Weight: 265–270 lb (120–122 kg) Competition; 280–300 lb (130–140 kg) Off-Season

Professional (Pro) career
- Pro-debut: IFBB Grand Prix Russia; 1997
- Best win: Grand Prix Romania, 3d; 2006

Sergey Vyacheslavovich Shelestov (Russian: Серге́й Вячесла́вович Ше́лестов; born May 25, 1971) is a retired IFBB professional bodybuilder from Russia.

== Early life ==
Shelestov was born on 25 May 1971 in the village of Talovaya, Voronezh Oblast, Russian SSR. His father was a railroad engineer, and his mother a schoolteacher. He became interested in sports while attending school, where he played soccer and was fond of wrestling. In high school, Sergei began to concentrate on athletics and spent much time in the gym. His passion for power sports began to grow, and he began to independently seek out methodical literature and developed programs for himself to effectively train certain muscles. At that time, he was seriously engaged in powerlifting, and obtained his first achievement in sports—the Candidate to Master of Sports in powerlifting before joining the Soviet Army in 1989.

== Career ==
=== Bodybuilding ===
His first amateur competition as a bodybuilder was during the years of his military service, when he participated in a local championship, and won the honorable place. At that point, Shelestov realized that bodybuilding was his true calling, and decided to devote himself to it. In May 1992, after the dissolution of the Soviet Union, the Soviet Army became the Armed Forces of the Russian Federation, and Shelestov rose to the rank of captain before leaving the service in 1996. In 1993, he became the third in the NABBA Russian Championship, losing the 1st place to Sergei Ogorodnikov.

A year later, Shelestov retired from military service and moved with his wife Irina to Moscow. In the capital, he met up with a famous coach, Mikhail Golovnev, who became not only his coach, but also his promoter and manager. Sergei had changed several jobs for the first years in Moscow, from a guard to a personal trainer. For a long time, he worked in the fitness club Rhein (Рейн) at the Kuntsevsky District of Moscow. Shelestov participated in the IFBB Moscow championships, where he took the 1st place from 1995 to 1997. The real fame and success came to him in 1998, when Sergei won the Cup of Russia, and then the World Amateur Bodybuilding Championship. In the autumn of the same year, he became the absolute champion of Russia.

In 2001, Shelestov received a Pro Card and participated in two professional tournaments. In 2001, Sergei ranked 11th in the Grand Prix England. In 2006 he became the 3rd at the Grand Prix in Romania. Then there was a lull in his career until 2005. It was related to household problems, at the same time, Sergei continued to train and maintained his shape during that period.

In 2006, he again received Pro Card (the old one was canceled) and participated in several pro-tournaments.

In 2007, Sergei Shelestov competed at the Arnold Classic (15th place), Mr. Olympia (16th place) and Ironman Pro 2007 (16th place). His best result was the 8th place in the Arnold Classic, he became the 26th after that competition in the IFBB Men's Bodybuilding Professional Ranking in 2009.

==== Contest History ====
- 1997 IFBB Grand Prix Russia - 10th
- 2001 IFBB Grand Prix England - 11th
- 2001 IFBB Grand Prix New Zealand - 5th
- 2006 IFBB Santa Susanna Gran Prix - 7th
- 2006 IFBB Romania Gran Prix - 3rd
- 2007 IFBB Iron Man Pro - 16th
- 2007 IFBB Sacramento Pro Bodybuilding Grand Prix - 12th
- 2007 IFBB Arnold Classic - 15th
- 2007 IFBB Olympia - NP
- 2008 IFBB Australia Pro Grand Prix VIII - 7th
- 2008 IFBB New Zealand Grand Elite Pro - 4th
- 2008 IFBB Olympia - 17th
- 2008 IFBB Romanian Pro Grand Prix - 4th
- 2009 IFBB Arnold Classic - 8th
- 2009 IFBB Europa Show of Champions - 4th
- 2009 IFBB New York Pro - 9th

=== Powerlifting ===
In 2000, Sergey Shelestov became the Moscow Champion in Powerlifting and took second place in the Russian Powerlifting Championship. In 2000, he set a record in the bench press - 250 kg and squats - 365 kg.

== Family ==
Sergey Shelestov is married to Irina Shelestova, a former Russian fitness star. They have a daughter, Olga, who was born in 2007.
