= Mikhail Sazonov =

Russian bodybuilder, and powerlifter (born 1990)

Personal information
- Full name: Mikhail Viktorovich Sazonov
- Nickname: Ignat Mihailov
- Born: December 22, 1990 Russia
- Height: 187 cm (6 ft 2 in)
- Weight: 120 kg (260 lb)

Sport
- Sport: Bodybuilding, Powerlifting

Mikhail Viktorovich Sazonov (Russian: Михаил Викторович Сазонов; born December 22, 1990) is a Russian bodybuilder, and powerlifter, also known as Ignat Mihailov (Игнат Михайлов).

== Biography ==
Originally from Krasnoyarsk, Sazonov grew up accustomed to extremely hard work. Before he got involved in bodybuilding and powerlifting, he used to be a bobsledder. He graduated from Siberian Institute of Technology where he majored in silviculture.

A member of the Russian Powerlifting Federation (RPF), weighing 120 kg (260 lb), he has been Champion of Krasnoyarsk Region in deadlift (345 kg). In 2012 he participated in World Sub-Juniors and Juniors Powerlifting Championships in Szczyrk. He placed fourth among superheavyweight juniors with the total record of 870 kg/502,2510 points. He set a national record in the squat (395 kg). Absolute champion of Krasnoyarsk Region and Krasnoyarsk in powerlifting.

His first bodybuilding competition, The SFD Siberian Cup, took place in March 2015. During the contest Sazonov placed second in 90 kg+ category. The same year he was an 85 kg+ category bronze medalist of Irkutsk Oblast Championships.

Sazonov works as a gym trainer. Married, he lives in Krasnoyarsk.

== Powerlifting competition records ==
- Squat: 395 kg (871 pounds)
- Deadlift: 345 kg (761 pounds)
- Bench press: 210 kg (463 pounds)
- Total: 870 kg (1,918 pounds)

== Powerlifting competitions ==
- 2014: Siberian Federal District' Powerlifting Championships, federation RPF, weight class 120 kg+ — N/A
- 2014: Krasnoyarsk Krai BP Championships, federation FPKK, weight class 120 kg+ — 5th
- 2012: World Sub-Juniors and Juniors Powerlifting Championships, federation IPF, weight class 120 kg — 4th
- 2012: National Powerlifting Juniors and Sub-Juniors Championships, federation RPF, weight class 120 kg — 1st
- 2011: 24th Powerlifting Championships of Krasnoyarsk Region, federation FPKK, weight class 120 — 1st
- 2011: 24th Krasnoyarsk Region Bench Press Championships, federation FPKK, weight class 120 — 4th
- 2011: XX Pervenstvo Rossii po paujerliftingu sredi juniorov, federation RPF, weight class 105 — 5th
- 2010: XXI Open powerlifting tournir "Center of Asia", federation RPF, weight class 110 — 3rd
- 2009: XXII Powerlifting Championships of Krasnoyrsk Region, federation FPKK, weight class 100 — 3rd
- 2009: BenchPress Tournament Sergey Sutygina's Memories, federation FPKK, weight class 100 — 2nd
- 2009: Powerlifting Championships of Krasnoyrsk, federation FPKK, weight class 100 — 4th

== Bodybuilding competitions ==
- 2015: SFD Siberian Cup, 90 kg+ category — 2nd
- 2015: Irkutsk Oblast Championships, 85 kg+ category — 3rd
