= Yuliya Anashkina =

Russian luger (born 1980)

Yuliya Igorevna Anashkina (Russian: Ю́лия И́горевна Ана́шкина; born November 18, 1980, in Chusovoy, Perm Krai, Russian SFSR) is a Russian luger who has competed since 2000. She finished 16th in the women's singles event at the 2006 Winter Olympics in Turin.

Anashkina′s best finish at the FIL World Luge Championships was 19th in the women's singles event twice (2004, 2007).
