= Konstantin Aladashvili =

Russian bobsledder and skeleton racer

Konstantin Aladashvili (born November 27, 1977) is a Russian bobsledder and skeleton racer who has competed since 1999. He finished 22nd in the men's skeleton event at the 2002 Winter Olympics in Salt Lake City. Aladashvili also competed at the FIBT World Championships, finishing 23rd in the men's skeleton event at Calgary, in 2005.

Aladashvili competed in bobsledding from 2000 to 2006, earning his best finish of eighth in a World Cup two-man event held in Sigulda, Latvia. He also competed at the FIBT World Championships, finishing 23rd in the men's skeleton event at Calgary in 2005.

== World Cup 2005/2006 results ==
- 24th on November 10, 2005, Calgary CAN
- DNS on November 17, 2005, Lake Placid, New York, U.S.
