= Dmitri Zhdanov =

Russian footballer

Personal information
- Full name: Dmitri Aleksandrovich Zhdanov
- Date of birth: 28 March 1977 (age 49)
- Place of birth: Moscow, Russian SFSR
- Height: 1.75 m (5 ft 9 in)
- Position: Midfielder

Youth career
- FC Dynamo Moscow

Senior career*
Years	Team	Apps	(Gls)
1995–1998	FC Avtomobilist Noginsk	139	(9)
1999	FC Shinnik Yaroslavl	11	(0)
2000	FC Avtomobilist Noginsk	30	(3)
2001	FC Presnya Moscow (amateur)		
2002	FC Almaz Moscow (amateur)		
2005	FC Titan Moscow	13	(1)
- * Club domestic league appearances and goals

Dmitri Aleksandrovich Zhdanov (Russian: Дмитрий Александрович Жданов; born 28 March 1977 in Moscow) is a former Russian football player.
