= Zhdanov, Lori =

Zhdanov
- Location within Armenia
- Coordinates: 40°50′33″N 44°26′15″E
- Country: Armenia
- Marz (Province): Lori
- Time zone: UTC+4 ( )
  - Summer (DST): UTC+5 ( )

Zhdanov (also, Gyshlag) is a town in the Lori Province of Armenia. The town was renamed in honor of Andrei Zhdanov.
