= Mayisyan, Armavir =

Village in Armavir, Armenia

Mayisyan Մայիսյան
- Location within Armenia
- Coordinates: 40°09′42″N 44°05′18″E
- Country: Armenia
- Marz (Province): Armavir

Population (2011)
  - Total: 1,525
- Time zone: UTC+4 ( )
  - Summer (DST): UTC+5 ( )

Mayisyan (Armenian: Մայիսյան), is a village in the Armavir Province of Armenia. It was founded as a collective farm (sovkhoz) and named Sovkhoz No.2. Later it became known as Imeni Beriya, named after Lavrentiy Beria. In 1953, it was renamed Imeni Zhdanovaor Zhdanov after Andrei Zhdanov. In 2006, the village was renamed Mayisyan, in memory of the Armenian victory over the Turks during the battles of Abaran and Sardarabad in May 1918.

== See also ==
- Armavir Province
