= Stepan Zhdanov =

Russian ice hockey player (born 1989)

- Born: August 25, 1989 (age 36) Novokuznetsk, Russia
- Height: 5 ft 7 in (170 cm)
- Weight: 181 lb (82 kg; 12 st 13 lb)
- Position: Forward
- Shoots: Right
- KHL team: Metallurg Novokuznetsk
- NHL draft: Undrafted
- Playing career: 2009–present

Stepan Zhdanov (born August 25, 1989) is a professional ice hockey player. He played 13 games of the 2009–10 season with Metallurg Novokuznetsk of the Kontinental Hockey League.
