= 2010 ITU World Championship Series =

2010 ITU World Triathlon Series
- League: ITU World Triathlon Series
- Sport: Triathlon

Men's Series
- Series Champion: Javier Gómez (ESP)
- Points: 3789

Women's Series
- Series Champion: Emma Moffatt (AUS)
- Points: 3805

World Triathlon Series seasons
- 2009 2011

The Dextro Energy Triathlon – ITU World Championship Series 2010 was a series of six World Championship Triathlon Events leading to a Grand Final held in Budapest, Hungary in September 2010. The Series was organised under the auspices of the world governing body of triathlon – the International Triathlon Union (ITU) – and was sponsored by the company Dextro Energy.

== Series events ==
The series touched down on three continents, stopping in some locations used in the 2009 series, as well as some new ones. Budapest was a successful new venue for the ITU World Cup/World Championships.

Date	Location	Status
April 11	(Australia) Sydney	Event
May 8	(South Korea) Seoul	Event
June 5–6	(Spain) Madrid	Event
July 17–18	(Germany) Hamburg	Event
July 24–25	London, United Kingdom	Event
August 14–15	(Austria) Kitzbühel	Event
September 8–12	Budapest, Hungary	Grand Final

== Results ==
=== Overall world championship ===
Points were distributed at each World Championship Event to the top 40 finishers in the men's and women's elite races, and to the top 50 finishers at the Grand Final. Points towards the ITU World Championship ranking could also be obtained at the World Cup events. The sum of each athlete's best four points scores in the World Championship and World Cup Events (maximum of two World Cup scores) and the points score from the World Championship Grand Final determined the final ranking.

==== Men's championship ====
Rank	Name	Nation	World Cups							World Championship Events						Grand Final	Total
Rank	Name	Nation	1	2	3	4	5	6	7	AUS	KOR	ESP	GER	UK	AUT	Grand Final	Total
1	Javier Gomez	Spain									339	~~633~~	800	800	740	1110	3789
2	Steffen Justus	Germany									633	586	464	429	~~182~~	1027	3138
3	Brad Kahlefeldt	Australia		~~300~~			~~34~~			~~367~~	685		542	542	464	879	3110
4	Jan Frodeno	Germany					~~220~~			~~71~~	800	~~542~~	740	685	685	53	2962
5	João Silva	Portugal			300						~~156~~	501	397	~~367~~	501	950	2649
6	Alistair Brownlee	Great Britain										800		397	38	1200	2435
7	Sven Riederer	Switzerland									123	685	633	269	~~248~~	695	2405
8	Alexander Brukhankov	Russia					~~138~~			740	586	~~397~~	429	633	~~367~~		2388
9	David Hauss	France		203						685		61			429	813	2190
10	Courtney Atkinson	Australia		~~138~~			257				740	740			213	146	2096

Full ranking:

==== Women's championship ====
Rank	Name	Nation	World Cups							World Championship Events						Grand Final	Total
Rank	Name	Nation	1	2	3	4	5	6	7	AUS	KOR	ESP	GER	UK	AUT	Grand Final	Total
1	Emma Moffatt	Australia					~~278~~			685	685		740	~~429~~	586	1110	3805
2	Nicola Spirig	Switzerland									633	800		740	213	1027	3413
3	Lisa Norden	Sweden								586	314		800	~~114~~	740	950	3389
4	Helen Jenkins	Great Britain					~~257~~			~~269~~	429	685		685	633	752	3183
5	Paula Findlay	Canada			300		237							800	800	879	3016
6	Andrea Hewitt	New Zealand					~~220~~			740	586		~~542~~	633	685	233	2877
7	Kate Roberts	South Africa		~~237~~						542		~~339~~	633	464	542	550	2731
8	Vicky Holland	Great Britain		~~127~~						397	~~197~~		586	542	314	813	2651
9	Mariko Adachi	Japan				~~188~~				633	501	633	339	~~83~~		471	2578
10	Laura Bennett	United States		~~86~~			~~203~~			290			501	586	464	695	2536

Full ranking:

=== Event medalists ===
==== Men ====
Event	Gold	Silver	Bronze
Sydney	Bevan Docherty (NZL)	Alexander Brukhankov (RUS)	David Hauss (FRA)
Seoul	Jan Frodeno (GER)	Courtney Atkinson (AUS)	Brad Kahlefeldt (AUS)
Madrid	Alistair Brownlee (GBR)	Courtney Atkinson (AUS)	Sven Riederer (SUI)
Hamburg	Javier Gómez (ESP)	Jan Frodeno (GER)	Tim Don (GBR)
London	Javier Gómez (ESP)	Jonathan Brownlee (GBR)	Jan Frodeno (GER)
Kitzbühel	Stuart Hayes (GBR)	Javier Gómez (ESP)	Jan Frodeno (GER)
Budapest	Alistair Brownlee (GBR)	Javier Gómez (ESP)	Steffen Justus (GER)
Final Ranking	Javier Gómez (ESP)	Steffen Justus (GER)	Brad Kahlefeldt (AUS)

==== Women ====
Event	Gold	Silver	Bronze
Sydney	Bárbara Riveros Díaz (CHI)	Andrea Hewitt (NZL)	Emma Moffatt (AUS)
Seoul	Daniela Ryf (SUI)	Bárbara Riveros Díaz (CHI)	Emma Moffatt (AUS)
Madrid	Nicola Spirig (SUI)	Emmie Charayron (FRA)	Helen Jenkins (GBR)
Hamburg	Lisa Nordén (SWE)	Emma Moffatt (AUS)	Aileen Morrison (IRL)
London	Paula Findlay (CAN)	Nicola Spirig (SUI)	Helen Jenkins (GBR)
Kitzbühel	Paula Findlay (CAN)	Lisa Nordén (SWE)	Andrea Hewitt (NZL)
Budapest	Emma Snowsill (AUS)	Emma Moffatt (AUS)	Nicola Spirig (SUI)
Final Ranking	Emma Moffatt (AUS)	Nicola Spirig (SUI)	Lisa Nordén (SWE)
