= 2009 ITU World Championship Series =

Coordinates: 28.02°S 153.4°E

2009 ITU World Triathlon Series
- League: ITU World Triathlon Series
- Sport: Triathlon

Men's Series
- Series Champion: Alistair Brownlee (GBR)
- Points: 4400

Women's Series
- Series Champion: Emma Moffatt (AUS)
- Points: 4340

World Triathlon Series seasons
- ITU Triathlon World Championship 2010

The 2009 ITU World Championship Series was a series of seven triathlon events leading to a Grand Final held in Gold Coast, Queensland, Australia in September 2009. The series was organised under the auspices of the world governing body of triathlon – the International Triathlon Union (ITU) – and was sponsored by Dextro Energy. The 2009 World Championship Series (WCS) was the first year of a change in format replacing the single World Championship race of prior years. Additionally, points accumulated in 2009 ITU Triathlon World Cup events would contribute to an athlete's overall point total in the Championship Series.

== Series events ==
The series featured on four continents in the inaugural year, stopping in some locations previously used as successful World Cup race destinations, as well as the first chance for athletes to try out the venue of the 2012 Olympic Triathlon at Hyde Park in London.

Date	Location	Status
2–3 May	(South Korea) Tongyeong	Event
30–31 May	Madrid, Spain	Event
20–21 June	Washington, DC, United States	Event
11–12 July	Kitzbühel, Austria	Event
25–26 July	Hamburg, Germany	Event
15–16 August	London, United Kingdom	Event
22–23 August	Yokohama, Japan	Event
9–13 September	Gold Coast, Australia	Grand Final

=== Prize purses ===
The prize purses offered to the top performers during the series were significantly greater than previous World Championship events, with a total of US$700,000 being distributed. Additionally $150,000 was distributed at each of the 2009 World Championship Events, and $250,000 at the Grand Final.

== Results ==
=== Overall world championship ===
Points were distributed at each World Championship Event to the top 40 finishers in the men's and women's elite races, and to the top 50 finishers at the Grand Final. Points towards the ITU World Championship ranking could also be obtained at the World Cup events. The sum of each athlete's best four points scores in the World Championship and World Cup Events (maximum of two World Cup scores) and the points score from the World Championship Grand Final determined the final ranking.

==== Men's championship ====
Rank	Name	Nation	World Cups		World Championship Events							Grand Final	Total
Rank	Name	Nation	1	2	KOR	ESP	USA	AUT	GER	UK	JPN	Grand Final	Total
1	Alistair Brownlee	Great Britain				800	800	800		800		1200	4400
2	Javier Gomez	Spain	~~203~~			685	740	740			685	1110	3960
3	Maik Petzold	Germany				633	685	633	542		~~397~~	950	3443
4	Jan Frodeno	Germany	~~257~~			397	542		397		800	1027	3163
5	Steffen Justus	Germany			586		429		633	740		752	3140
6	Laurent Vidal	France	~~220~~		~~464~~	~~314~~	501	685		586	633	643	3048
7	Courtney Atkinson	Australia	~~300~~	~~300~~	397	740		~~339~~		501	464	879	2980
8	Kris Gemmell	New Zealand	~~278~~	~~237~~	633			~~429~~	501	685	740	345	2904
9	Dmitry Polyanski	Russia	~~300~~		685		501	397	464	~~314~~		813	2860
10	Jarrod Shoemaker	United States	~~220~~	~~174~~	542	~~339~~	464		800		542	436	2783

Full ranking:

==== Women's championship ====
Rank	Name	Nation	World Cups		World Championship Events							Grand Final	Total
Rank	Name	Nation	1	2	KOR	ESP	USA	AUT	GER	UK	JPN	Grand Final	Total
1	Emma Moffatt	Australia	~~300~~	~~278~~	740		800	800	800			1200	4340
2	Lisa Nordén	Sweden	~~188~~			740	~~314~~		740	740	800	1100	4130
3	Andrea Hewitt	New Zealand	~~203~~		~~41~~	800	542	685		~~429~~	740	695	3462
4	Daniela Ryf	Switzerland	~~257~~	~~174~~		464	685		685	542	~~248~~	813	3187
5	Helen Jenkins	Great Britain	~~149~~		290	~~248~~	586	586		685		1027	3173
6	Sarah Haskins	United States	~~161~~			586	633		542		429	950	3139
7	Juri Ide	Japan	300		685		464				685	345	2479
8	Magali Di Marco Messmer	Switzerland	~~237~~		501	542	~~197~~	314	314	~~314~~		752	2423
9	Jessica Harrison	France			339	685	501	197				643	2365
10	Annabel Luxford	Australia	188						248	290	586	879	2191

Full ranking:

=== Event medalists ===
==== Tongyeong ====
2–3 May 2009

Medal	Men's race			Women's race		
Medal	Name	Nation	Time	Name	Nation	Time
Gold medal	Bevan Docherty	New Zealand	1:50:25	Emma Snowsill	Australia	2:02:42
Silver medal	Brad Kahlefeldt	Australia	1:50:25	Emma Moffatt	Australia	2:02:52
Bronze medal	Dmitry Polyanskiy	Russia	1:50:30	Juri Ide	Japan	2:03:30

==== Madrid ====
30–31 May 2009

Medal	Men's race			Women's race		
Medal	Name	Nation	Time	Name	Nation	Time
Gold medal	Alistair Brownlee	Great Britain	1:51:26	Andrea Hewitt	New Zealand	2:05:58
Silver medal	Courtney Atkinson	Australia	1:52:14	Lisa Nordén	Sweden	2:05:59
Bronze medal	Javier Gomez	Spain	1:52:18	Jessica Harrison	France	2:05:59

==== Washington, DC ====
20–21 June 2009

Medal	Men's race			Women's race		
Medal	Name	Nation	Time	Name	Nation	Time
Gold medal	Alistair Brownlee	Great Britain	1:48:58	Emma Moffatt	Australia	1:59:55
Silver medal	Javier Gomez	Spain	1:49:11	Emma Snowsill	Australia	2:00:20
Bronze medal	Maik Petzold	Germany	1:49:24	Daniela Ryf	Switzerland	2:01:01

==== Kitzbühel ====
11–12 July 2009

Medal	Men's race			Women's race		
Medal	Name	Nation	Time	Name	Nation	Time
Gold medal	Alistair Brownlee	Great Britain	1:43:13	Emma Moffatt	Australia	1:54:38
Silver medal	Javier Gomez	Spain	1:43:21	Nicola Spirig	Switzerland	1:55:12
Bronze medal	Laurent Vidal	France	1:43:24	Andrea Hewitt	New Zealand	1:55:17

==== Hamburg ====
25–26 July 2009

Medal	Men's race			Women's race		
Medal	Name	Nation	Time	Name	Nation	Time
Gold medal	Jarrod Shoemaker	United States	1:44:06	Emma Moffatt	Australia	1:56:12
Silver medal	Brad Kahlefeldt	Australia	1:44:14	Lisa Nordén	Sweden	1:57:06
Bronze medal	Alexander Brukhankov	Russia	1:44:16	Daniela Ryf	Switzerland	1:57:39

==== London ====
15–16 August 2009

Medal	Men's race			Women's race		
Medal	Name	Nation	Time	Name	Nation	Time
Gold medal	Alistair Brownlee	Great Britain	1:41:50	Nicola Spirig	Switzerland	1:54:24
Silver medal	Steffen Justus	Germany	1:41:58	Lisa Nordén	Sweden	1:54:26
Bronze medal	Kris Gemmell	New Zealand	1:42:01	Helen Jenkins	Great Britain	1:54:29

==== Yokohama ====
22–23 August 2009

Medal	Men's race			Women's race		
Medal	Name	Nation	Time	Name	Nation	Time
Gold medal	Jan Frodeno	Germany	1:44:31	Lisa Nordén	Sweden	1:55:55
Silver medal	Kris Gemmell	New Zealand	1:44:49	Andrea Hewitt	New Zealand	1:56:00
Bronze medal	Javier Gomez	Spain	1:44:51	Juri Ide	Japan	1:56:03

==== Gold Coast – Grand Final ====
9–13 September 2009

Medal	Men's race			Women's race		
Medal	Name	Nation	Time	Name	Nation	Time
Gold medal	Alistair Brownlee	Great Britain	1:44:51	Emma Moffatt	Australia	1:59:14
Silver medal	Javier Gomez	Spain	1:44:57	Lisa Nordén	Sweden	1:59:19
Bronze medal	Jan Frodeno	Germany	1:45:21	Helen Jenkins	Great Britain	1:59:41
