= 2003 ITU Triathlon World Championships =

Trialthon championship

The 2003 ITU Triathlon World Championships were held in Queenstown, New Zealand on December 6, 2003.

== Medal summary ==
Event	Gold	Silver	Bronze
Elite Men	Peter Robertson (AUS)	Iván Raña (ESP)	Olivier Marceau (SUI)
Elite Women	Emma Snowsill (AUS)	Laura Bennett (USA)	Michellie Jones (AUS)
U23 Men	Javier Gómez (ESP)	Nick Hornman (AUS)	Steffen Justus (GER)
U23 Women	Nikki Egyed (AUS)	Mirinda Carfrae (AUS)	Zuriñe Rodríguez (ESP)
