= 2007 ITU Triathlon World Championships =

The 2007 ITU Triathlon World Championships were held in Hamburg, Germany from 30 August to 2 September 2007.

== Medal summary ==
Event	Gold	Silver	Bronze
Men's Elite	Daniel Unger (GER)	Javier Gómez (ESP)	Brad Kahlefeldt (AUS)
Women's Elite	Vanessa Fernandes (POR)	Emma Snowsill (AUS)	Laura Bennett (USA)
Men's U23	Gregor Buchholz (GER)	Brendan Sexton (AUS)	Ivan Vasiliev (RUS)
Women's U23	Lisa Nordén (SWE)	Jasmine Oeinck (USA)	Renata Koch (HUN)
