= 2006 ITU Triathlon World Championships =

The 2006 ITU Triathlon World Championships were held in Lausanne, Switzerland on September 2 and September 3, 2006.

== Results ==
=== Men's Championship ===
Rank	Name	Swim	Bike	Run	Time
Gold medal	Tim Don (GBR)	17:30	01:01:58	30:47	01:51:32
Silver medal	Hamish Carter (NZL)	17:19	01:02:05	31:02	01:51:49
Bronze medal	Frédéric Belaubre (FRA)	17:15	01:02:15	31:25	01:52:12
4	Kris Gemmell (NZL)	17:42	01:01:46	32:15	01:53:01
5	Volodymyr Polikarpenko (UKR)	17:22	01:03:16	31:01	01:53:04
6	Peter Robertson (AUS)	17:25	01:03:25	30:59	01:53:06
7	Hunter Kemper (USA)	17:33	01:03:06	31:06	01:53:07
8	Daniel Unger (GER)	17:28	01:02:02	32:24	01:53:11
9	Andrew Johns (GBR)	17:45	01:02:55	31:21	01:53:20
10	Francisco Javier Gómez (ESP)	17:26	01:03:13	31:27	01:53:27

=== Women's Championship ===
Rank	Name	Swim	Bike	Run	Time
Gold medal	Emma Snowsill (AUS)	19:14	01:09:48	33:35	02:04:02
Silver medal	Vanessa Fernandes (POR)	19:06	01:09:54	34:24	02:04:48
Bronze medal	Felicity Abram (AUS)	20:18	01:08:38	34:46	02:05:13
4	Lauren Groves (CAN)	19:12	01:09:52	34:57	02:05:24
5	Nadia Cortassa (ITA)	19:57	01:09:01	34:56	02:05:28
6	Andrea Whitcombe (GBR)	19:12	01:09:47	35:14	02:05:46
7	Joelle Franzmann (GER)	19:05	01:09:54	35:40	02:06:05
8	Laura Bennett (USA)	19:02	01:10:00	35:51	02:06:16
9	Tania Haiboeck (AUT)	20:07	01:08:51	35:50	02:06:20
10	Andrea Hewitt (NZL)	19:12	01:09:50	36:05	02:06:33
