= Hy-Vee Triathlon =

Triathlon held in Des Moines, Iowa

The Hy-Vee Triathlon (now known as the Des Moines Triathlon) was an Olympic-distance triathlon race held in Des Moines, Iowa, USA. From 2011 to 2014, the race served as the World Triathlon Corporation's 5150 Series U.S. Championships. Previously, it was part of the ITU Triathlon World Cup series from 2008 to 2010. The annual triathlon event attracted many of the top professional triathletes in the world due, in part, to having the largest prize purse awarded for Olympic-distance races in the sport (and from 2008 to 2012, the largest in the sport overall). In addition to professional triathletes, the triathlon event features competition among amateur athletes as well.

== History ==
The first edition of the event, held June 17, 2007, featured the largest prize in triathlon history, at $200,000 each for the men's and women's elite winners through organizer and presenting sponsor Hy-Vee, a regional grocer. Approximately 10,000 spectators came downtown to the event, which was held in downtown Des Moines, swimming at Gray's Lake and finishing at the Iowa State Capitol.

The 2008 edition, held June 22, served as the final United States qualifier for the 2008 Summer Olympics in Beijing, China. Due to flooding, it was moved to West Des Moines. Initially, there was uncertainty about its Olympic-qualifying status, as bacteria levels in nearby Blue Heron Lake left the swimming option in questionable status. However, officials confirmed that there would be swimming. As part of the Olympic qualifying Hunter Kemper and Sarah Haskins claimed the final United States Olympic spots as Rasmus Henning and three-time World Champion Emma Snowsill were the overall winners.

In 2011, the World Triathlon Corporation (WTC) announced that the Hy-Vee triathlon would serve as the site for its 5150 Series U.S. Championships. The race will have the largest prize purse in triathlon, with $1 million total being paid out and $151,500 going to the men and women's winners. The race was moved from June to Labor Day weekend and returned downtown after three years in West Des Moines.

In 2013, Hy-Vee announced that it was reducing the total purse from $1.1 million to $500,000. The men's and women's winners received $100,000 each with $20,000 going to 2nd place and $15,000 to third.

Hy-Vee opted to discontinue the event following the 2014 edition.

Premier Event Management, who formerly produced the Hy-Vee Triathlon, kept the event going as The Des Moines Triathlon in 2015–2016.

Beginning in 2017, IMG and Premier Event Management, announced that the Des Moines Triathlon is now a part of the Escape Series.

== Results ==
=== Men's winners ===
Year	Athlete	Country	Time	Location	Notes
2007	Rasmus Henning	Denmark	1:50:04	Des Moines	Inaugural race
2008	Rasmus Henning (2)	Denmark	1:54:21	West Des Moines	race moved to West Des Moines due to flooding
2009	Simon Whitfield	Canada	1:49:43	West Des Moines	Course record
2010	Tim Don	United Kingdom	1:50:20	West Des Moines	
2011	Greg Bennett	Australia	1:47:37	Des Moines	
2012	Javier Gómez	Spain	1:51:21	Des Moines	Swim course moved to Gray's Lake due to low river water levels
2013	Javier Gómez (2)	Spain	1:45:57	Des Moines	Entire course at Gray's Lake
2014	Hunter Kemper	United States	1:44:43	Des Moines	
2015	Cam Dye	United States	1:47:48	Des Moines	Inaugural Des Moines Triathlon
2016	Matthew Hanson	United States	1:50:35	Des Moines	2nd Annual Des Moines Triathlon

=== Women's winners ===
Year	Athlete	Country	Time	Location	Notes
2007	Laura Bennett	United States	2:04:30	Des Moines	Inaugural race
2008	Emma Snowsill	Australia	2:03:15	West Des Moines	Course moved to West Des Moines due to flooding
2009	Emma Moffatt	Australia	1:59:46	West Des Moines	Course record
2010	Emma Snowsill (2)	Australia	1:59.34	West Des Moines	Course record
2011	Lisa Nordén	Sweden	1:59:12	Des Moines	
2012	Lisa Nordén (2)	Sweden	2:01:59	Des Moines	Swim course moved to Gray's Lake due to low river water levels
2013	Emma Moffatt (2)	Australia	1:57:04	Des Moines	Entire course held at Gray's Lake
2014	Helle Frederiksen	Denmark	1:54:44	Des Moines	
2015	Sarah Haskins	United States	2:00:28	Des Moines	Inaugural Des Moines Triathlon
2016	Abby Levene	United States	2:05:24	Des Moines	2nd Annual Des Moines Triathlon

== Website ==
- Des Moines Escape Tri
