= Lauren Campbell =

Canadian triathlete

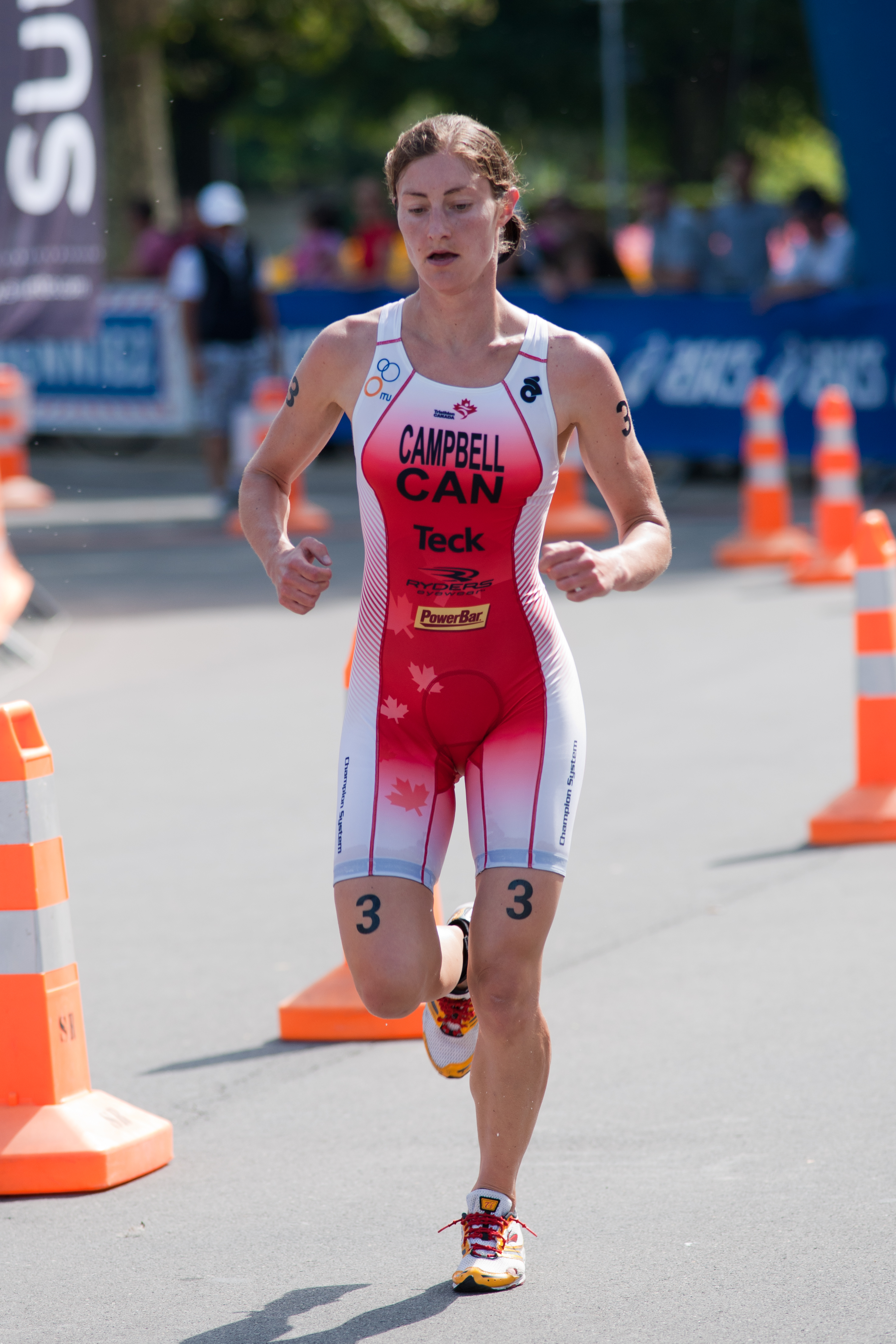
- Campbell at the 2010 ITU World Triathlon Championships in Lausanne, Switzerland

Personal information
- Full name: Lauren Groves-Campbell
- Nicknames: Grovesy, Grovez
- Born: 2 September 1981 (age 45) Vancouver, British Columbia
- Home town: Victoria, British Columbia
- Height: 1.70 m (5 ft 7 in)
- Weight: 55 kg (121 lb)

Sport
- Country: Canada
- Club: Queen's Triathlon Club
- Coached by: Philippe Bertrand
Medal record
Women's triathlon
Representing Canada
Pan American Games
Bronze medal – third place	2007 Rio de Janeiro	Women's
ITU Triathlon World Cup
Gold medal – first place	2012 Edmonton	Elite
Hy-Vee ITU Triathlon World Cup
Bronze medal – third place	2009 Des Moines	Elite
Bronze medal – third place	2009 Des Moines	Mixed relay

Lauren Campbell (née Groves, born 2 September 1981) is a triathlete from Canada, who won the bronze medal at the 2007 Pan American Games in Rio de Janeiro, Brazil, and competed at the 2008 Summer Olympics in Beijing. She is currently ranked no. 48 in the world by the International Triathlon Union.

== Biography ==
Born in Vancouver, British Columbia, Campbell started out her sporting career while she was swimming competitively in a local club at the age of six, and also ran cross-country, and track and field. By the age of nineteen, she decided to focus on triathlon upon her admission at the Queen's University in Kingston, Ontario, and began training at the Queen's University Triathlon Club. After completing her psychology degree, major in forensics, at the Queen's University, Campbell moved to Victoria, British Columbia, where she trained full-time through Pacific Sport at the National Triathlon Training Centre. Campbell also admitted that she had never heard of triathlon, until she watched Simon Whitfield competing and winning the gold medal in the men's event at the 2000 Summer Olympics in Sydney.

=== Triathlon career ===
Campbell made her sporting debut at the 2001 ITU Triathlon World Championship in Edmonton, Alberta, under the junior category, where she finished only in thirty-first place. She later and further improved on her athletic performance and forty-hour weekly training to set her fourth-place finish at the 2003 ITU Triathlon World Under-23 Championships in Queenstown, New Zealand. After achieving her first best result, Campbell was ranked as one of Canada's top triathletes, and continued to build her success in triathlon by winning the 2006 ITU Triathlon Pan American Cup in Roatan, Honduras, and her first national championship in Brampton, Ontario. Campbell reached higher into the international level, when she finished fourth, yet missed out the podium at the 2006 ITU Triathlon World Championships in Lausanne, Switzerland. Her fourth-place finish at the world championships was the best result by a Canadian female triathlete since Carol Montgomery in 2000. She was also ranked third in a career-high World Cup competition after placing eight in Edmonton.

Campbell qualified for the 2007 Pan American Games in Rio de Janeiro, Brazil, and won the bronze medal in the women's triathlon with a time of 1:59:50, just behind the U.S. triathletes Julie Ertel and Sarah Haskins, who both claimed the gold and silver, respectively. Following her success at the Pan American Games, Campbell emerged as a medal contender in the international stage, particularly with the World Cup and the Olympics. She won silver at the 2008 PATCO Pan American Championships in Mazatlan, Mexico, and finished thirteenth at the ITU Triathlon World Cups in Tongyeong, South Korea and Richards Bay, South Africa.

Campbell was selected to the national team, along with Carolyn Murray and Kathy Tremblay, for the 2008 Summer Olympics in Beijing, and awarded a qualifying place in the women's triathlon. After finishing second at the Pan American Championships and posting a pair of thirteenth-place finishes on the World Cup circuit, she was in good physical form to compete at the Olympics, yet overcame with knee problems that had plagued her most of the year. In the women's event, Campbell started out as a possibility of a top ten finish, and maintained her pace in the swimming leg. Finishing only in thirty-first place at both the swimming and first transition phase, Campbell had moved her way into a small group of competitors chasing the breakaways of the 40-km cycling race, until one of them went down in front of her, and crashed her bike. Unfortunately, she got lapped into the cycling course, and did not finish the race. While the other competitors crossed the finish line in the final leg, Campbell found herself en route to the hospital, where the medical staff confirmed that she had a fractured radial head bone in her left elbow. With Campbell being injured, her teammates, Murray and Tremblay, finished the event in twenty-ninth and thirty-first place, respectively.

After missing out the 2008 season with an elbow and knee injury, Campbell made a comeback in the local and international triathlon scene for the following year. She captured her first World Cup podium finish, by winning the bronze medal at the 2009 Hy-Vee ITU Triathlon Elite Cup in Des Moines, Iowa. Campbell also led a group of four Canadians, along with Whitfield, Tremblay, and Brent McMahon, to win the bronze for the mixed relay at the inaugural Team World Championship, and received $10,000 each for crossing the finish line with a time of 1:21:31. In the same year, Campbell finally achieved her highest placement, by winning gold medals each at the ITU Triathlon Pan American Premium Cup, and at the national championships in Kelowna, sharing the same triumphs with Whitfield in the men's event.

After winning her first title, Campbell took a year off from triathlon, following her recovery from a serious physical injury at the world championships, and a prior commitment towards her personal life. In 2011, she returned to the competition under her husband's surname, and won the bronze medal at both the ITU Sprint Triathlon Oceania Cup, and OTU Sprint Triathlon Oceania Championships in Devonport, Tasmania. Following her first medal under a new name, and a ninth-place finish at the ITU Triathlon World Cup in Mooloolaba, Australia, Campbell recaptured her success in the international scene, by winning the gold medal at the 2012 ITU Sprint Triathlon Pan American Cup in Bridgetown, Barbados, and claiming her first-ever career World Cup title in Edmonton.

=== Personal life ===
Campbell's father Robert Groves worked as a senior partner of Davis LLP Firm to sponsor and support his daughter's triathlon career. In 2010, she married her long-time partner Adam Campbell, a competitive ultra-marathon and mountain runner from Victoria, British Columbia, who responsibly initiated her career to become a successful triathlete. They were divorced shortly thereafter. Apart from triathlon, she plays badminton and basketball during her off-season, and also spends her free time at a neighbourhood coffee shop, trips to the mall, doing crafts and cooking.

== Achievements ==
Between 2002 and 2012, Campbell took part in 77 triathlon competitions, and had achieved thirty-six top-ten finishes, including eleven medals. Unless indicated otherwise, the events are triathlons (Olympic Distance) and belong to the Elite category. Championships with medals mentioned below are bolded.

Date	Competition	Place	Rank
July 22, 2001	ITU Triathlon World Junior Championships	Edmonton	31
July 14, 2002	ITU Triathlon World Cup	Edmonton	23
November 9, 2002	ITU Triathlon World Under-23 Championships	Cancun	8
June 7, 2003	ITU Triathlon World Cup	Tongyeong	DNF
July 20, 2003	ITU Triathlon World Cup	Corner Brook	17
July 27, 2003	ITU Triathlon World Cup	Salford	10
August 3, 2003	ITU Triathlon World Cup	Tiszaújváros	23
October 13, 2003	ITU Triathlon World Cup	Makuhari	17
November 2, 2003	ITU Triathlon World Cup	Cancun	6
November 9, 2003	ITU Triathlon World Cup	Rio de Janeiro	16
December 6, 2003	ITU Triathlon World Championships	Queenstown	4
April 11, 2004	ITU Triathlon World Cup	Ishigaki	DNF
May 22, 2004	ITU Triathlon Pan American Cup	Tempe	6
June 12, 2004	ITU Triathlon World Cup	Tongyeong	10
July 18, 2004	ITU Triathlon World Cup	Corner Brook	DNF
April 16, 2005	ITU Triathlon World Cup	Honolulu	12
April 24, 2005	ITU Triathlon World Cup	Mazatlan	11
July 17, 2005	ITU Triathlon World Cup	Corner Brook	6
September 10, 2005	ITU Triathlon World Championships	Gamagori	41
September 17, 2005	ITU Triathlon World Cup	Beijing	25
November 13, 2005	ITU Triathlon World Cup	New Plymouth	15
February 19, 2006	ITU Triathlon Oceania Cup	Hobart	8
**March 25, 2006**	**ITU Triathlon Pan American Cup**	**Roatan Bay**	**1st place, gold medalist(s)**
April 16, 2006	ITU Triathlon World Cup	Ishigaki	5
May 7, 2006	ITU Triathlon World Cup	Mazatlan	6
June 4, 2006	ITU Triathlon World Cup	Madrid	DNF
June 11, 2006	ITU Triathlon World Cup	Richards Bay	4
**June 25, 2006**	**ITU Triathlon Pan American Cup**	**Long Beach**	**3rd place, bronze medalist(s)**
**July 2, 2006**	**ITU Triathlon Pan American Cup**	**Brampton**	**1st place, gold medalist(s)**
July 9, 2006	ITU Triathlon World Cup	Edmonton	7
July 23, 2006	ITU Triathlon World Cup	Corner Brook	6
September 2, 2006	ITU Triathlon World Championships	Lausanne	4
September 9, 2006	ITU Triathlon World Cup	Hamburg	13
November 5, 2006	ITU Triathlon World Cup	Cancun	19
November 12, 2006	ITU Triathlon World Cup	New Plymouth	DNF
March 25, 2007	ITU Triathlon World Cup	Mooloolaba	13
April 15, 2007	ITU Triathlon World Cup	Ishigaki	DNF
June 10, 2007	ITU Triathlon World Cup	Vancouver	8
June 17, 2007	ITU Triathlon World Cup	Des Moines	DNF
June 24, 2007	ITU Triathlon World Cup	Edmonton	8
**July 15, 2007**	**Pan American Games**	**Rio de Janeiro**	**3rd place, bronze medalist(s)**
July 22, 2007	ITU Triathlon World Cup	Kitzbühel	22
July 29, 2007	ITU Triathlon World Cup	Salford	9
August 30, 2007	ITU Triathlon World Championships	Hamburg	14
September 15, 2007	ITU Triathlon World Cup	Beijing	19
**April 4, 2008**	**PATCO Triathlon Pan American Championships**	**Mazatlan**	**2nd place, silver medalist(s)**
April 26, 2008	ITU Triathlon World Cup	Tongyeong	13
May 4, 2008	ITU Triathlon World Cup	Richards Bay	13
June 5, 2008	ITU Triathlon World Championships	Vancouver	33
June 22, 2008	Hy-Vee ITU Triathlon World Cup	Des Moines	DNF
August 18, 2008	Olympic Games	Beijing	DNF
April 26, 2009	ITU Triathlon World Cup	Ishigaki	8
May 2, 2009	Dextro Energy Triathlon – ITU World Championship Series	Tongyeong	10
June 21, 2009	Dextro Energy Triathlon – ITU World Championship Series	Washington, D.C.	10
**June 27, 2009**	**Hy-Vee ITU Triathlon World Cup**	**Des Moines**	**3rd place, bronze medalist(s)**
**June 28, 2009**	**Hy-Vee ITU Triathlon Team World Championships**	**Des Moines**	**3rd place, bronze medalist(s)**
July 11, 2009	Dextro Energy Triathlon – ITU World Championship Series	Kitzbühel	10
July 25, 2009	Dextro Energy Triathlon – ITU World Championship Series	Hamburg	4
**August 23, 2009**	**ITU Triathlon Pan American Cup**	**Kelowna**	**1st place, gold medalist(s)**
September 9, 2009	Dextro Energy Triathlon – ITU World Championship Grand Final	Gold Coast	19
August 21, 2010	ITU Team Triathlon World Championships	Lausanne	15
**January 15, 2011**	**ITU Sprint Triathlon Oceania Cup**	**Devonport**	**3rd place, bronze medalist(s)**
March 26, 2011	ITU Triathlon World Cup	Mooloolaba	9
April 9, 2011	Dextro Energy Triathlon – ITU World Championship Series	Sydney	10
June 18, 2011	Dextro Energy Triathlon – ITU World Championship Series	Kitzbühel	DNF
January 13, 2012	PATCO Triathlon Pan American Championships	La Paz	11
**February 12, 2012**	**ITU Sprint Triathlon Pan American Cup**	**Devonport**	**1st place, gold medalist(s)**
March 3, 2012	ITU Sprint Triathlon Pan American Cup	Clermont	8
March 24, 2012	ITU Triathlon World Cup	Mooloolaba	12
April 14, 2012	Dextro Energy World Triathlon	Sydney	24
May 10, 2012	ITU World Triathlon	San Diego	25
May 26, 2012	ITU World Triathlon	Madrid	DNF
**July 6, 2012**	**ITU Triathlon World Cup**	**Edmonton**	**1st place, gold medalist(s)**
August 25, 2012	ITU World Triathlon	Stockholm	26
August 25, 2012	ITU World Team Triathlon	Stockholm	16
October 20, 2012	ITU Barfoot & Thompson World Triathlon Grand Final	Auckland	21
