= 2004 ITU Triathlon World Championships =

The 2004 ITU Triathlon World Championships were held in Madeira, Portugal on May 9, 2004.

== Medal summary ==
Event	Gold	Silver	Bronze
Elite Men	Bevan Docherty (NZL)	Iván Raña (ESP)	Dmitriy Gaag (KAZ)
Elite Women	Sheila Taormina (USA)	Loretta Harrop (AUS)	Laura Bennett (USA)
U23 Men	Sebastian Dehmer (GER)	Jan Frodeno (GER)	Ruedi Wild (SUI)
U23 Women	Annabel Luxford (AUS)	Vendula Frintova (CZE)	Maria del Socorro Joyce (PHI)
