= Sarah True =

American triathlete (born 1981)

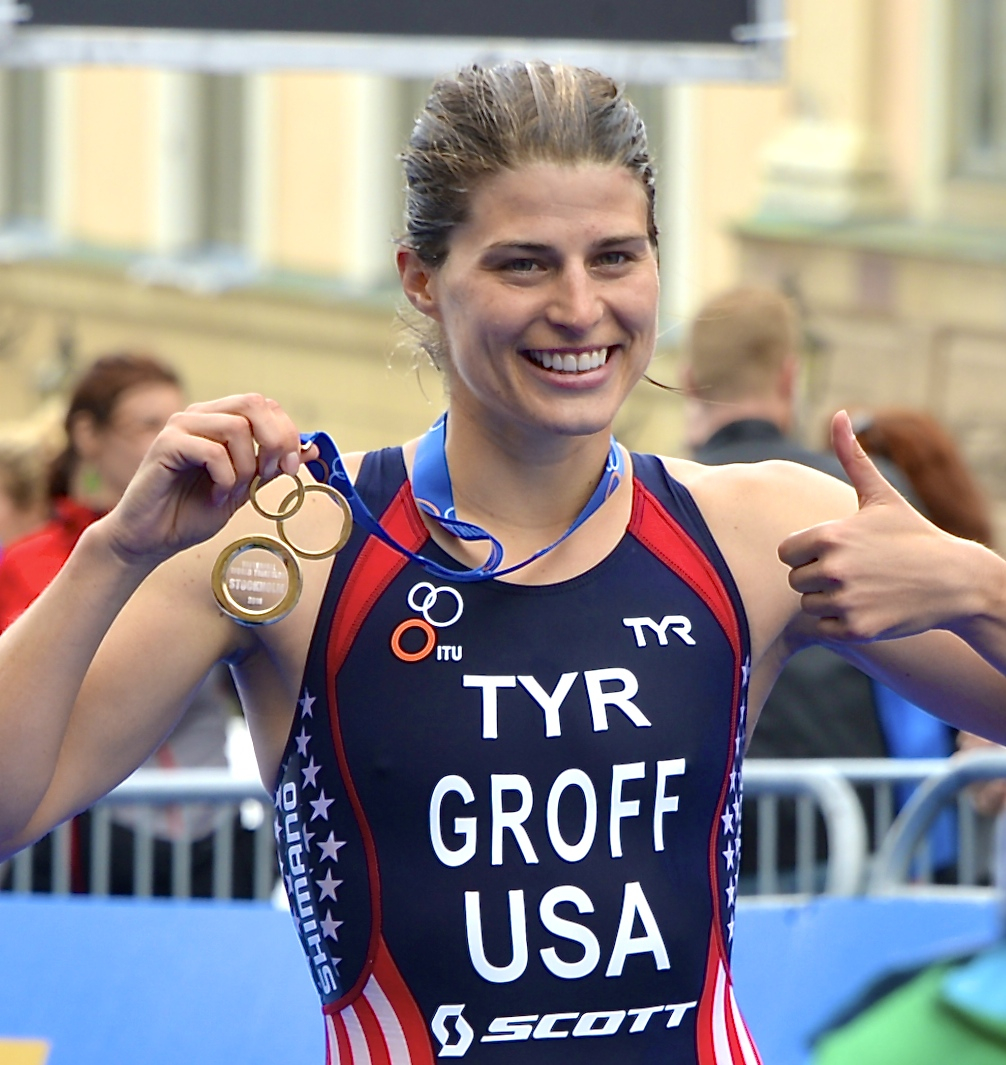
- Sarah True winner in 2014 ITU World Triathlon Series in Stockholm.

Personal information
- Full name: Sarah Brooke True
- Nationality: American
- Born: November 27, 1981 (age 44) Hanover, New Hampshire
- Height: 5 ft 8 in (173 cm)
- Weight: 138 lb (63 kg)
- Website: Official website

Sport
- Sport: Triathlon
Medal record
Women's Triathlon
Representing United States
ITU Triathlon World Championships
Silver medal – second place	2014	Elite
Bronze medal – third place	2015	Elite
Bronze medal – third place	2011	Elite
ITU Aquathlon World Championships
Gold medal – first place	2007	Individual

Sarah True (née Groff, born November 27, 1981) is an American athlete who competes in triathlon. She represented the United States in triathlon in 2012, finishing in fourth place, and at the 2016 Summer Olympics. True is the winner of the 2007 ITU Aquathlon World Championships and finished in second place in the 2014 ITU World Triathlon Series.

== Athletic career ==
=== Early life ===
True was born to parents Gerald and Jeannine Groff in Hanover, New Hampshire at Dartmouth–Hitchcock Medical Center and raised in Cooperstown, New York. She competed in cross country, track and swimming in high school at Cooperstown High School and Deerfield Academy. After spending a year in Valencia, Spain, True went on to attend Middlebury College where she was a member of the swim team and competed in middle distance and distance freestyle events. True was named to the All-NESCAC and All-American teams for her accomplishments.

After graduating, True found it difficult to choose between swimming and running for her future athletic pursuits. After having some success in some amateur triathlon competitions she decided to pursue the sport of triathlon further.

=== International racing (2005–2010) ===
True began her International Triathlon Union (ITU) racing in 2005, competing in various World Cup and Pan American Cup races. In 2007, True had her first notable finish, winning the 2007 ITU Aquathlon World Championships. That same year she placed 4th at the ITU World Cup race in Edmonton and was a member of the runner-up USA squad at the ITU World Team Championship. The following year, with coach Siri Lindley, she placed 2nd at the 2008 World Cup race in Huatulco and placed 7th at the ITU World Championship in Vancouver. At the first 2008 USA Triathlon Olympic Trials in Tuscaloosa, True placed third, and at the end of the year she finished as the top American woman and 4th overall in the ITU World Cup season series.

In 2009, True had three top 10 finishes in ITU racing, including 9th-place finishes in the newly revamped World Championship Series (WCS) events in Madrid and Washington, D.C. She was the 2nd ranking American woman in the WCS series. In 2010, she joined up with coach Darren Smith. True's year began with a bike crash that fractured her sacrum which caused her pain throughout the racing season. During the year she would go on to take 12th at London, 10th at Kitzbühel and 8th at Hamburg in WCS racing events. She also took 2nd at the USA Triathlon Elite Championship and 5th at the US Open Toyota Cup finale in Dallas. Despite her results, True felt she was at a low point in her career due to injury and unsatisfying race results.

=== Olympic racing (2011–2016) ===
After taking some time off to heal, the 2011 season yielded much better results. True finished third at the 2011 WCS race in Kitzbühel, achieving the first-ever podium finish for a U.S. woman. A month later, she would place 7th in London, a designated World Qualification Event for the 2012 Olympics, putting her on the American Olympic team with second-place finisher Gwen Jorgensen. Her performances for the entire 2011 WCS series earned her an overall third-place finish in the World Championships Series standings, the best showing by an American triathlete in the three-year history of the series.

True competed in the 2012 Olympic Games in triathlon where she finished in fourth place, the highest American in triathlon. She finished with a time of 2:00:00, ten seconds back of the bronze medal. True also finished the 2012 ITU World Triathlon Series ranked seventh in the final point standings. For her accomplishments she was named by USA Triathlon as their Olympic/ITU Athlete of the Year. The next year, she finished 9th in the 2013 ITU World Triathlon Series and took second in the USA Triathlon National Championships finishing behind Jorgensen.

True scored her first World Triathlon Series win in 2014 at the penultimate round in Stockholm. The following weekend, in Edmonton, Alberta, Canada at the 2014 ITU World Triathlon Series Grand Finale, she finished in fourth place and secured second place in the overall points standings just behind fellow American Jorgensen.

At the 2016 Summer Olympics she represented the United States again in the triathlon. During the race she suffered a leg cramp in her quadriceps following the swim portion of her race. She was unable to recover and was lapped during the bike segment, forcing her withdrawal from the race.

=== Long-distance triathlon ===
After the Olympics True focused most of her racing on non-drafting, long-distance competitions. In 2017, True won races at Ironman 70.3 Augusta and Ironman 70.3 Austin. The following year she took 2nd place at Ironman European Championship, her first Ironman competition and then another 2nd-place finish at Ironman Mont-Tremblant. At the Ironman World Championship that October True finished fourth.

After giving birth to her son in 2021, True returned to racing in 2022 by grabbing wins at Ironman Eagleman 70.3 and at Ironman Lake Placid.

== Personal life ==
Sarah is married to runner Ben True. She is the sister of writer Lauren Groff.
