= 2015 ITU World Triathlon Series =

- League: ITU World Triathlon Series
- Sport: Triathlon

Men's Series
- Series Champion: Javier Gómez (ESP)
- Points: 4930

Women's Series
- Series Champion: Gwen Jorgensen (USA)
- Points: 5200

World Triathlon Series seasons
- 2014 2016

The 2015 ITU World Triathlon Series is a series of ten World Championship Triathlon events that lead up to a Grand Final held in Chicago. The Series is organised under the auspices of the world governing body of triathlon, the International Triathlon Union (ITU).

== Calendar ==
The 2015 series visited ten cities around the world.

| Date | Location | Status |
|---|---|---|
| March 6–7 | (United Arab Emirates) Abu Dhabi | Sprint distance |
| March 28–29 | (New Zealand) Auckland | |
| April 11–12 | (Australia) Gold Coast | |
| April 25–26 | (South Africa) Cape Town | |
| May 16–17 | (Japan) Yokohama | |
| May 30–31 | (United Kingdom) London | Sprint distance |
| July 18–19 | (Germany) Hamburg | Sprint distance |
| August 22–23 | (Sweden) Stockholm | |
| September 5–6 | (Canada) Edmonton | Sprint distance |
| September 15–20 | (United States) Chicago | Grand Final |

== Results ==
=== Medal summary ===
==== Men ====
| Event | Gold | Silver | Bronze |
|---|---|---|---|
| Abu Dhabi | Mario Mola (ESP) | Vincent Luis (FRA) | Richard Murray (RSA) |
| Auckland | Jonathan Brownlee (GBR) | Javier Gómez (ESP) | Pierre Le Corre (FRA) |
| Gold Coast | Jonathan Brownlee (GBR) | Mario Mola (ESP) | Javier Gómez (ESP) |
| Cape Town | Alistair Brownlee (GBR) | Javier Gómez (ESP) | Vincent Luis (FRA) |
| Yokohama | Javier Gómez (ESP) | Alistair Brownlee (GBR) | Mario Mola (ESP) |
| London | Alistair Brownlee (GBR) | Fernando Alarza (ESP) | Vincent Luis (FRA) |
| Hamburg | Vincent Luis (FRA) | Javier Gómez (ESP) | Mario Mola (ESP) |
| Stockholm | Javier Gómez (ESP) | João Pereira (POR) | Aaron Royle (AUS) |
| Edmonton | Richard Murray (RSA) | Javier Gómez (ESP) | Mario Mola (ESP) |
| Chicago | Mario Mola (ESP) | Javier Gómez (ESP) | Richard Murray (RSA) |

==== Women ====
| Event | Gold | Silver | Bronze |
|---|---|---|---|
| Abu Dhabi | Gwen Jorgensen (USA) | Katie Zaferes (USA) | Flora Duffy (BER) |
| Auckland | Gwen Jorgensen (USA) | Katie Zaferes (USA) | Andrea Hewitt (NZL) |
| Gold Coast | Gwen Jorgensen (USA) | Sarah True (USA) | Katie Zaferes (USA) |
| Cape Town | Vicky Holland (GBR) | Katie Zaferes (USA) | Nicola Spirig (SUI) |
| Yokohama | Gwen Jorgensen (USA) | Ashleigh Gentle (AUS) | Emma Moffatt (AUS) |
| London | Gwen Jorgensen (USA) | Katie Zaferes (USA) | Sarah True (USA) |
| Hamburg | Gwen Jorgensen (USA) | Vicky Holland (GBR) | Non Stanford (GBR) |
| Stockholm | Sarah True (USA) | Katie Zaferes (USA) | Andrea Hewitt (NZL) |
| Edmonton | Vicky Holland (GBR) | Flora Duffy (BER) | Gillian Backhouse (AUS) |
| Chicago | Gwen Jorgensen (USA) | Non Stanford (GBR) | Vicky Holland (GBR) |

Rankings : http://wts.triathlon.org/rankings/

== Overall standings ==
The athlete who accumulates the most points throughout the 8 race season is declared the year's world champion. The final point standings are:

=== Men ===
| Rank | Athlete | Points |
|---|---|---|
| Gold medal | Javier Gómez (ESP) | 4930 |
| Silver medal | Mario Mola (ESP) | 4794 |
| Bronze medal | Vincent Luis (FRA) | 4421 |
| 4 | Richard Murray (RSA) | 4316 |
| 5 | Fernando Alarza (ESP) | 3774 |
| 6 | Ryan Bailie (AUS) | 3195 |
| 7 | Crisanto Grajales (MEX) | 3005 |
| 8 | João José Pereira (POR) | 2986 |
| 9 | Aaron Royle (AUS) | 2964 |
| 10 | Pierre Le Corre (FRA) | 2701 |

=== Women ===
| Rank | Athlete | Points |
|---|---|---|
| Gold medal | Gwen Jorgensen (USA) | 5200 |
| Silver medal | Andrea Hewitt (NZL) | 4079 |
| Bronze medal | Sarah True (USA) | 4073 |
| 4 | Vicky Holland (GBR) | 3952 |
| 5 | Katie Zaferes (USA) | 3900 |
| 6 | Rachel Klamer (NED) | 3097 |
| 7 | Flora Duffy (BER) | 3093 |
| 9 | Non Stanford (GBR) | 2890 |
| 8 | Aileen Reid (IRL) | 2721 |
| 10 | Emma Moffatt (AUS) | 2720 |
