= World Triathlon Championship Series =

World championship series in the sport of triathlon

- Sport: Triathlon
- First season: 2009
- Most recent champions: Vasco Vilaça (POR); Cassandre Beaugrand (FRA)
- Most titles: Javier Gómez (ESP) (5) (men); Flora Duffy (BER) (4) (women)
- Website: wtcs.triathlon.org
- 2026 World Triathlon Championship Series

The World Triathlon Championship Series is an annual series of triathlon events organised by World Triathlon. The series is used to crown an annual world champion since 2008. Previously, the ITU (the former name of World Triathlon) world champions between 1989 and 2008 had been decided in single annual championship races, the ITU Triathlon World Championships.

== Format ==
The Championship Series consists of multiple rounds of competitions culminating in a Grand Final race. Athletes compete head-to-head for points in these races that will determine the overall World Triathlon champion. The elite championship races are held, with one exception, over one of two distances, the standard or 'Olympic' distance (1.5 km swim, 40 km bike, 10 km run) which lasts between 1.5 and two hours, and the sprint distance, which is half of the standard distance and lasts around one hour (750 m swim, 20 km bike, 5 km run).

Since 2018 a mixed relay series has been run in tandem, where national teams compete in mixed team relays for prize money and Olympic qualifying points. From these races, one is denominated as the World Triathlon Mixed Relay Championships. Relays typically consist of four 'super-sprint' legs.

From 2021 until 2023 the leg holding the Mixed Relay Championships lso included the reinstated World Triathlon Sprint Championships under the combined branding of World Triathlon Sprint & Relay Championships. The stand-alone Sprint championship had previously been discontinued in 2011. Races in the sprint world championships as of 2021 were held over Super-sprint distances (300 m swim, 5 km bike, 2.5 km run) using a multi-race eliminator format which is unique to that event. The sprint event was cancelled in 2024 due to water quality at the Montreal venue, and has not been held since.

The final leg of the overall series is designated and marketed as the Grand Final, and has a greater points allocation, which must be included in the athletes final score ranking for the season along with a fixed number of best other results. In addition, the week of the Grand Final event sees other stand alone World Championship events held, including an elite under-23 event, single-race elite para-triathlon championship events, and a series of non-elite age-grade championships, similar to Gran Fondo World Championships in road cycling and World Athletics Road Running Championships.

== History ==
=== 1989-2008 : ITU Triathlon World Championships ===
With the establishment of the International Triathlon Union (ITU, now World Triathlon) in 1989 it was quickly established that the governing body should host a yearly world championship to establish the men's and women's world champion. With the creation and hosting of the first ITU Triathlon World Championship in 1989 the ITU had established itself and the sports premier event but the sport overall lacked cohesion with races of varying lengths and prize pools, which increased the difficulty for triathletes to train and plan for seasons ahead. So in 1991 the ITU created the ITU Triathlon World Cup a year long series of races all hosted by the ITU with regular distances and prize money. With a world championship and a regular season established the ITU's attention moved onto other issues including earning the sport a place at the Olympics.

=== 2008-present : World Triathlon Championships Series ===
Then in 2008 the day after the 2008 men's Olympic triathlon race the ITU announced starting next year it would be replacing the single race world championship with a six-race World Championship points super series culminating in a Grand Final, it was to be called the World Championship Series (WCS). The ITU believed it would help grow the sport and increase the reach to the level of major sports whilst gaining a bigger TV audience. Most athletes and professional coaches were happy at the announcement believing it would help the sport become more popular and increase professionalism and pay for the top level athletes. However, there were major monetary concerns one week after the announcement as the ITUs main sponsor BG had pulled out of its nine-year sponsorship deal after only two years.

By its start in 2009 the series had gained a title sponsor in Dextro Energy in a $2 million deal allowing for each World Championship event to feature a $150,000 prize purse and for the Grand final to have $250,000, this also meant that $700,000 was available at the end of the series. This influx of cash meant that athletes would be to earn almost triple what they had previously helping to draw more into the sport. In 2011 the sprint distance world championship was incorporated into the series giving the same points and prize money as any other event, from this point on sprint distance events would make up a part of the series. In 2012 Dextro Energy ended their title sponsorship in tandem with the series rebranding itself as the World Triathlon Series. Then in 2013 the prize pool saw an increase to $2.25 million certifying the world triathlon series as the richest series in triathlon. In 2018 with the growing popularity of the World Triathlon Mixed Relay Championships and the disciplines' addition to the Olympic program it was decided that at three of the events on the 2018 calendar a mixed relay event would be held alongside the men's and women's competition; these three events would grant points towards Olympic qualification and constitute the new mixed relay series.

=== 2020 : Covid-19 and one-off single championship races ===
Only two triathletes succeeded in winning World Championships under both formats, Javier Gomez of Spain, and Helen Jenkins (née Tucker) of Great Britain and Wales. In 2020, in response to multiple race cancellations as a result of COVID-19 the Championship was once more decided on the basis of a single Championship race, won by Vincent Luis of France and Georgia Taylor-Brown of Great Britain and England. As Luis had already won a world title in 2019 under the now established season-long format, he in effect became only the third triathlete to win World Championships in both the single race and season-long formats.

== Disciplines ==
Currently there are three different distance disciplines:

- Standard- A 1500m swim followed by a 40 km cycle followed by a 10 km run.
- Sprint- A 750m swim followed by a 20 km cycle followed by a 5 km run.
- Mixed Team Relay- A 4 x (300m swim followed by a 7.5 km cycle followed by a 1.5 km run) where each athlete completes the swim bike run before tagging the next athlete, with the order of the athletes always being female, male, female, male.

In all instances the swim will be a mass start in open-water and the cycling will be draft-legal. There is an allowed leniency of 10% on each segment of courses route for the standard and sprint distances, with more discretion being allowed for the mixed relay. The standard distance was also known as the Olympic distance as it was the only distance competed for in the Olympics, however the World Triathlon has tried to enforce the use of the name standard distance saving the name Olympic on for official Olympic events.

== World champions : 1998-present ==
=== ITU Triathlon World Championships era : 1989-2008 ===
ITU Triathlon World Championship
- Founded: 1989
- Folded: 2008
- Replaced by: ITU World Triathlon Series

The world champion was formerly crowned in the ITU Triathlon World Championship, a single championship race that was held annually from 1989, the same year as the formation of the International Triathlon Union (ITU), to 2008.

==== Men's championship ====
Year	Gold	Silver	Bronze
1989	Mark Allen (USA)	Glenn Cook (GBR)	Rick Wells (NZL)
1990	Greg Welch (AUS)	Brad Beven (AUS)	Stephen Foster (AUS)
1991	Miles Stewart (AUS)	Rick Wells (NZL)	Mike Pigg (USA)
1992	Simon Lessing (GBR)	Rainer Müller-Hörner (GER)	Rob Barel (NED)
1993	Spencer Smith (GBR)	Simon Lessing (GBR)	Hamish Carter (NZL)
1994	Spencer Smith (GBR) (2)	Brad Beven (AUS)	Ralf Eggert (GER)
1995	Simon Lessing (GBR) (2)	Brad Beven (AUS)	Ralf Eggert (GER)
1996	Simon Lessing (GBR) (3)	Luc Van Lierde (BEL)	Leandro Macedo (BRA)
1997	Chris McCormack (AUS)	Hamish Carter (NZL)	Simon Lessing (GBR)
1998	Simon Lessing (GBR) (4)	Paul Amey (NZL)	Miles Stewart (AUS)
1999	Dmitriy Gaag (KAZ)	Simon Lessing (GBR)	Miles Stewart (AUS)
2000	Olivier Marceau (FRA)	Peter Robertson (AUS)	Craig Walton (AUS)
2001	Peter Robertson (AUS)	Chris Hill (AUS)	Craig Watson (NZL)
2002	Iván Raña (ESP)	Peter Robertson (AUS)	Andrew Johns (GBR)
2003	Peter Robertson (AUS) (2)	Iván Raña (ESP)	Olivier Marceau (SUI)
2004	Bevan Docherty (NZL)	Iván Raña (ESP)	Dmitriy Gaag (KAZ)
2005	Peter Robertson (AUS) (3)	Reto Hug (SUI)	Brad Kahlefeldt (AUS)
2006	Tim Don (GBR)	Hamish Carter (NZL)	Frédéric Belaubre (FRA)
2007	Daniel Unger (GER)	Javier Gómez (ESP)	Brad Kahlefeldt (AUS)
2008	Javier Gómez (ESP)	Bevan Docherty (NZL)	Reto Hug (SUI)

==== Women's championship ====
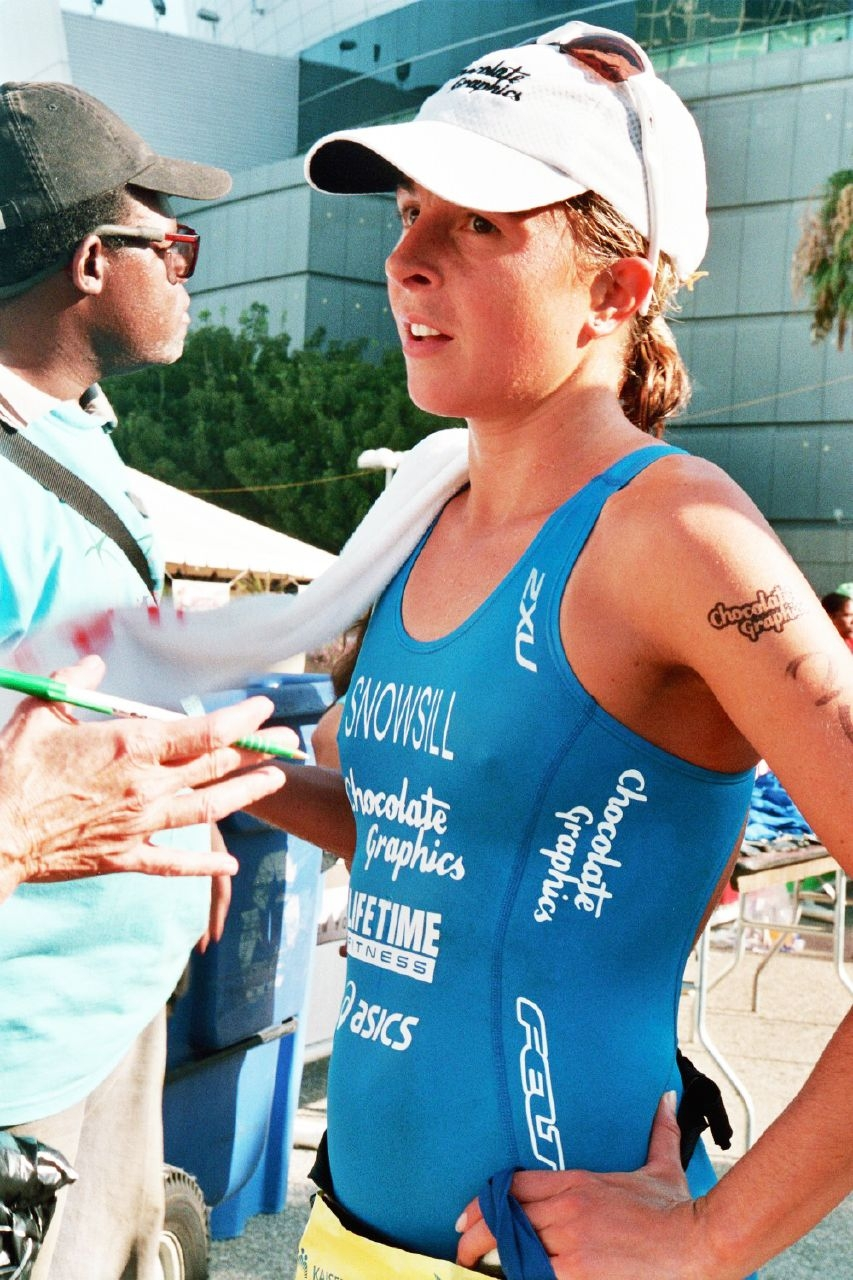
Australian Emma Snowsill captured the title on 3 different occasions.

Year	Gold	Silver	Bronze
1989	Erin Baker (NZL)	Jan Ripple (USA)	Laurie Samuelson (USA)
1990	Karen Smyers (USA)	Carol Montgomery (CAN)	Joy Hansen (USA)
1991	Joanne Ritchie (CAN)	Terri Smith (CAN)	Michellie Jones (AUS)
1992	Michellie Jones (AUS)	Joanne Ritchie (CAN)	Melissa Mantak (USA)
1993	Michellie Jones (AUS) (2)	Karen Smyers (USA)	Joanne Ritchie (CAN)
1994	Emma Carney (AUS)	Anette Pedersen (DEN)	Sarah Harrow (NZL)
1995	Karen Smyers (USA) (2)	Jackie Gallagher (AUS)	Joy Leutner (USA)
1996	Jackie Gallagher (AUS)	Emma Carney (AUS)	Carol Montgomery (CAN)
1997	Emma Carney (AUS) (2)	Jackie Gallagher (AUS)	Michellie Jones (AUS)
1998	Joanne King (AUS)	Michellie Jones (AUS)	Evelyn Williamson (NZL)
1999	Loretta Harrop (AUS)	Jackie Gallagher (AUS)	Emma Carney (AUS)
2000	Nicole Hackett (AUS)	Carol Montgomery (CAN)	Michellie Jones (AUS)
2001	Siri Lindley (USA)	Michellie Jones (AUS)	Joanna Zeiger (USA)
2002	Leanda Cave (GBR)	Barbara Lindquist (USA)	Michelle Dillon (GBR)
2003	Emma Snowsill (AUS)	Laura Bennett (USA)	Michellie Jones (AUS)
2004	Sheila Taormina (USA)	Loretta Harrop (AUS)	Laura Bennett (USA)
2005	Emma Snowsill (AUS) (2)	Annabel Luxford (AUS)	Laura Bennett (USA)
2006	Emma Snowsill (AUS) (3)	Vanessa Fernandes (POR)	Felicity Abram (AUS)
2007	Vanessa Fernandes (POR)	Emma Snowsill (AUS)	Laura Bennett (USA)
2008	Helen Tucker (GBR)	Sarah Haskins (USA)	Samantha Warriner (NZL)

==== Medal table : ITU Triathlon World Championships era : 1989-2008 ====
Rank	Nation	Gold	Silver	Bronze	Total
1	Australia	17	15	13	45
2	Great Britain	9	3	3	15
3	United States	5	5	9	19
4	New Zealand	2	5	5	12
5	Spain	2	3	0	5
6	Canada	1	4	0	5
7	Germany	1	1	2	4
8	Portugal	1	1	0	2
9	France	1	0	1	2
9	Kazakhstan	1	0	1	2
11	Switzerland	0	1	2	3
12	Belgium	0	1	0	1
12	Denmark	0	1	0	1
14	Brazil	0	0	1	1
14	Netherlands	0	0	1	1
Totals (15 entries)		40	40	38	118

==== Triathlon World Championships host cities ====
Year	Date	Location
1989	6 August	Avignon, France
1990	15 September	Orlando, United States
1991	13 October	Queensland, Australia
1992	12 September	Muskoka, Canada
1993	22 August	Manchester, United Kingdom
1994	27 November	Wellington, New Zealand
1995	12 November	Cancún, Mexico
1996	24 August	Cleveland, United States
1997	16 November	Perth, Australia
1998	30 August	Lausanne, Switzerland
1999	12 September	Montreal, Canada
2000	30 April	Perth, Australia
2001	22 July	Edmonton, Canada
2002	9–10 November	Cancún, Mexico
2003	6–7 December	Queenstown, New Zealand
2004	9 May	Madeira, Portugal
2005	10–11 September	Gamagōri, Japan
2006	2–3 September	Lausanne, Switzerland
2007	30 August–2 September	Hamburg, Germany
2008	5–8 June	Vancouver, Canada

=== World Triathlon Championships Series era : 2009-present ===
==== Men's championship ====
Year	Gold	Silver	Bronze
2009	Alistair Brownlee (GBR)	Javier Gómez (ESP)	Maik Petzold (GER)
2010	Javier Gómez (ESP) (†)	Steffen Justus (GER)	Brad Kahlefeldt (AUS)
2011	Alistair Brownlee (GBR) (2)	Jonathan Brownlee (GBR)	Javier Gómez (ESP)
2012	Jonathan Brownlee (GBR)	Javier Gómez (ESP)	Dmitry Polyanskiy (RUS)
2013	Javier Gómez (ESP) (3)	Jonathan Brownlee (GBR)	Mario Mola (ESP)
2014	Javier Gómez (ESP) (4)	Mario Mola (ESP)	Jonathan Brownlee (GBR)
2015	Javier Gómez (ESP) (5)	Mario Mola (ESP)	Vincent Luis (FRA)
2016	Mario Mola (ESP)	Jonathan Brownlee (GBR)	Fernando Alarza (ESP)
2017	Mario Mola (ESP) (2)	Javier Gómez (ESP)	Kristian Blummenfelt (NOR)
2018	Mario Mola (ESP) (3)	Vincent Luis (FRA)	Jacob Birtwhistle (AUS)
2019	Vincent Luis (FRA)	Mario Mola (ESP)	Javier Gómez (ESP)
2020^{‡}	Vincent Luis (FRA) (2)	Vasco Vilaça (POR)	Léo Bergère (FRA)
2021	Kristian Blummenfelt (NOR)	Marten Van Riel (BEL)	Alex Yee (GBR)
2022	Léo Bergère (FRA)	Alex Yee (GBR)	Hayden Wilde (NZL)
2023	Dorian Coninx (FRA)	Hayden Wilde (NZL)	Léo Bergère (FRA)
2024	Alex Yee (GBR)	Léo Bergère (FRA)	Hayden Wilde (NZL)
2025	Matthew Hauser (AUS)	Miguel Hidalgo (BRA)	Vasco Vilaça (POR)
2026	Vasco Vilaça (POR)	Matthew Hauser (AUS)	Ricardo Batista (POR)

† The athlete won his first title as World Champion under the old world championship system.

‡ The championship was restricted to a single race event due to COVID 19.

==== Women's championship ====
Year	Gold	Silver	Bronze
2009	Emma Moffatt (AUS)	Lisa Nordén (SWE)	Andrea Hewitt (NZL)
2010	Emma Moffatt (AUS) (2)	Nicola Spirig (SUI)	Lisa Nordén (SWE)
2011	Helen Jenkins (GBR) (2 †)	Andrea Hewitt (NZL)	Sarah Groff (USA)
2012	Lisa Nordén (SWE)	Anne Haug (GER)	Andrea Hewitt (NZL)
2013	Non Stanford (GBR)	Jodie Stimpson (GBR)	Anne Haug (GER)
2014	Gwen Jorgensen (USA)	Sarah Groff (USA)	Andrea Hewitt (NZL)
2015	Gwen Jorgensen (USA) (2)	Andrea Hewitt (NZL)	Sarah True (USA)
2016	Flora Duffy (BER)	Gwen Jorgensen (USA)	Ai Ueda (JPN)
2017	Flora Duffy (BER) (2)	Ashleigh Gentle (AUS)	Katie Zaferes (USA)
2018	Vicky Holland (GBR)	Katie Zaferes (USA)	Georgia Taylor-Brown (GBR)
2019	Katie Zaferes (USA)	Jessica Learmonth (GBR)	Georgia Taylor-Brown (GBR)
2020^{‡}	Georgia Taylor-Brown (GBR)	Flora Duffy (BER)	Laura Lindemann (GER)
2021	Flora Duffy (BER) (3)	Taylor Knibb (USA)	Taylor Spivey (USA)
2022	Flora Duffy (BER) (4)	Georgia Taylor-Brown (GBR)	Taylor Knibb (USA)
2023	Beth Potter (GBR)	Cassandre Beaugrand (FRA)	Emma Lombardi (FRA)
2024	Cassandre Beaugrand (FRA)	Beth Potter (GBR)	Emma Lombardi (FRA)
2025	Lisa Tertsch (GER)	Léonie Périault (FRA)	Beth Potter (GBR)
2026	Cassandre Beaugrand (FRA) (2)	Beth Potter (GBR)	Georgia Taylor-Brown (GBR)

† The athlete won the title of World Champion under the old world championship system.

‡ The championship was restricted to a single race event due to COVID 19.

==== Medal table : World Triathlon Championships Series era: 2008-present ====
Rank	Nation	Gold	Silver	Bronze	Total
1	Great Britain	9	9	6	24
2	Spain	7	6	4	17
3	France	6	4	5	15
4	Bermuda	4	1	0	5
5	United States	3	4	5	12
6	Australia	3	2	2	7
7	Germany	1	2	3	6
8	Portugal	1	1	2	4
9	Sweden	1	1	1	3
10	Norway	1	0	1	2
11	New Zealand	0	3	5	8
12	Belgium	0	1	0	1
12	Brazil	0	1	0	1
12	Switzerland	0	1	0	1
15	Japan	0	0	1	1
15	Russia	0	0	1	1
Totals (16 entries)		36	36	36	108

==== World Triathlon Championship Series Grand Finals locations ====
The final race of each season is known as the championship finals and has extra points, prize money and prestige associated with it, when a city bids to host the championship finals it also bids to host many World Triathlon events such as amateur Age-group world championships and the Paratriathlon world championship.

Year	Date	Location
2009	9–13 September	Gold Coast, Australia
2010	8–12 September	Budapest, Hungary
2011	10–11 September	Beijing, China
2012	20–21 October	Auckland, New Zealand
2013	14–15 September	London, Great Britain
2014	1 September	Edmonton, Canada
2015	17 September	Chicago, United States
2016	11-18 September	Cozumel, Mexico
2017	14-17 September	Rotterdam, Netherlands
2018	12–16 September	Gold Coast, Australia
2019	August 30–1 September	Lausanne, Switzerland
2020	Cancelled^{*}	Edmonton, Canada
2021	20-22 August	Edmonton, Canada
2022	22-26 November	Abu Dhabi, UAE
2023	23-24 September	Pontevedra, Spain
2024	17-20 October	Torremolinos, Spain
2025	15-19 October	Wollongong, Australia
2026	23-27 September	Pontevedra, Spain
2027	September 2027	Hamburg, Germany
2028	November 2028	Tauranga, New Zealand

^{*}2020 Series was cancelled due to COVID-19 pandemic. Champion was determined during a single sprint race event in Hamburg, Germany.

=== Overall medal table ===
1989 to date.

Rank	Nation	Gold	Silver	Bronze	Total
1	Australia	20	17	15	52
2	Great Britain	18	12	9	39
3	Spain	9	9	4	22
4	United States	8	9	14	31
5	France	7	4	6	17
6	Bermuda	4	1	0	5
7	New Zealand	2	8	10	20
8	Germany	2	3	5	10
9	Portugal	2	2	2	6
10	Canada	1	4	0	5
11	Sweden	1	1	1	3
12	Kazakhstan	1	0	1	2
12	Norway	1	0	1	2
14	Switzerland	0	2	2	4
15	Belgium	0	2	0	2
16	Brazil	0	1	1	2
17	Denmark	0	1	0	1
18	Japan	0	0	1	1
18	Netherlands	0	0	1	1
18	Russia	0	0	1	1
Totals (20 entries)		76	76	74	226

== See also ==
- World Triathlon Aquathlon Championships
- World Triathlon Cup
- World Triathlon Duathlon Championships
- World Triathlon Long Distance Championships
- World Triathlon Mixed Relay Championships
