= Andrea Whitcombe =

British former runner and triathlete

Personal information
- Nationality: British (English)
- Born: 8 June 1971 (age 55) London, England
- Height: 164 cm (5 ft 5 in)
- Weight: 47 kg (104 lb)

Sport
- Sport: Athletics
- Event: Long-distance
- Club: Parkside Harrow AC
Medal record
Athletics
Representing England
Commonwealth Games
Silver medal – second place	1998 Kuala Lumpur	5,000m

Andrea Whitcombe (born 8 June 1971) is a female former British International distance runner and triathlete.

== Athletics career ==
Whitcombe won the English National Cross Country Championships three times (1990, 1991, 1997) and competed at the World Cross Country Championships seven times.

Whitcombe became the British 5,000 metres champion after winning the British AAA Championships titles at the 1997 AAA Championships and 1998 AAA Championships.

Whitcombe won a silver medal in the 5000 metres representing England at the 1998 Commonwealth Games in Kuala Lumpur, Malaysia, and represented Great Britain in the same event at the 2000 Summer Olympics, before switching to the triathlon in 2001.

== Triathlon career ==
She finished in the top 10 at the World Triathlon Championships three times, and was the 2004 British Olympic reserve. In 2005, she won a bronze medal at the World Duathlon Championships, and won the ITU Triathlon World Cup event in Corner Brook, Canada.

== International competitions ==
Year	Competition	Venue	Position	Event	Notes
Representing Great Britain / England
1989	World Cross Country Championships (junior women)	Stavanger, Norway	14th	4 km	16:22
1990	World Cross Country Championships (junior women)	Aix-les-Bains, France	29th	4.4 km	15:02
1990	World Junior Championships	Plovdiv, Bulgaria	4th	3000 m	9:13.81
1991	World Cross Country Championships	Antwerp, Belgium	104th	6.4 km	22:44
1993	World Cross Country Championships	Amorebieta, Spain	110th	6.4 km	22:05
1996	World Cross Country Championships	Cape Town, South Africa	64th	6.4 km	22:14
1997	World Cross Country Championships	Parco del Valentino, Italy	104th	6.6 km	23:23
1998	Commonwealth Games	Kuala Lumpur, Malaysia	2nd	5000 m	15:56.85
1999	World Cross Country Championships (short race)	Belfast, Northern Ireland	45th	4.2 km	16:37
2000	Olympic Games	Sydney, Australia	41st (h)	5000 m	16:15.82
Triathlon / Duathlon
2003	European Triathlon Championships	Karlovy Vary, Czech Republic	4th	—	
2003	World Triathlon Championships	Queenstown, New Zealand	6th	—	2:09:17
2005	World Triathlon Championships	Gamagori, Japan	7th	—	2:01:08
2005	World Duathlon Championships	Newcastle, New South Wales	3rd	—	
2006	Commonwealth Games	Melbourne, Australia	7th	—	2:09
2006	European Triathlon Championships	Autun, France	4th	—	
2006	World Triathlon Championships	Lausanne, Switzerland	6th	—	2:05:46
2007	European Triathlon Championships	Copenhagen, Denmark	4th	—	2:03:29

== Personal life ==
Whitcombe has two children, a son Aeron and a daughter Willow.
