= Sheila Taormina =

American swimmer (born 1969)

Personal information
- Full name: Sheila Christine Taormina
- National team: United States
- Born: March 18, 1969 (age 57) Livonia, Michigan, U.S.
- Height: 5 ft 3 in (1.60 m)
- Weight: 119 lb (54 kg)

Sport
- Sport: Swimming
- Strokes: Freestyle
- College team: University of Georgia
Medal record
Women's swimming
Representing United States
Olympic Games
Gold medal – first place	1996 Atlanta	4×200 m freestyle
Universiade
Gold medal – first place	1995 Fukuoka	4×200 m freestyle
Silver medal – second place	1991 Sheffield	400 m medley
Women's triathlon
Representing the United States
ITU World Championships
Gold medal – first place	2004 Madeira	Elite
Pan American Games
Silver medal – second place	2003 Santo Domingo	Elite

Sheila Christine Taormina (born March 18, 1969) is an American former athlete who competed at four Olympics (1996, 2000, 2004, 2008), and was the first woman to qualify for the Olympics in three different sports (swimming, triathlon and modern pentathlon). At the 1996 Summer Olympics, she earned a gold medal as a member of the winning U.S. team in the women's 4×200-meter freestyle relay. She was inducted in 2009 into the USA Triathlon Hall of Fame, and in 2015 into the Michigan Sports Hall of Fame.

== Personal life ==
Born in 1969, Taormina is one of eight children, and is a twin. For a year in 2002-2003 she was subject to stalking resulting in five years' probation for the stalker then, after he violated probation by the continued stalking of Taormina, up to five years in prison.

== Swimmer ==
While swimming for the Georgia Bulldogs swimming and diving team, Taormina earned a Bachelor of Business Administration in 1992 and a Master of Business Administration in 1994 from the University of Georgia (UGA). She captained Georgia's 1991 team, won All-America honors all four years of her collegiate career and won the Southeastern Conference (SEC) title in the 400-meter individual medley as a senior. She was the first UGA swimmer to win an Olympic gold medal and the first UGA athlete to make the Olympic team in multiple sports.

== Triathlete ==
Taormina competed at the first Olympic triathlon at the 2000 Summer Olympics in Sydney, Australia. She took sixth place with a total time of 2:02:45.91. Her split times were 19:02.78 for the swim, 1:06:24.30 for the cycling, and 0:37:18.83 for the run.

In 2004, Taormina won the ITU Triathlon World Championship title while residing in Clermont, Florida. In the 2004 Summer Olympics in Athens, she again competed in the triathlon. Her time was 2:09:21.08 as she finished in 23rd place.

== Modern pentathlon ==
After Athens, Taormina embarked on a new sport, the modern pentathlon, winning the women's senior division of the 2005 Pan American Championships. She was successful in qualifying in the modern pentathlon for the 2008 Olympic Games in Beijing, making her the first female athlete to qualify for the Olympics in three different sports. Taormina finished 19th in the 2008 Olympic event.

== Teaching and writing ==
Taormina has dedicated time to teaching, coaching and conducting seminars around the world and has authored three top-selling guides: Swim Speed Secrets, Swim Speed Workouts, and Swim Speed Strokes.

== See also ==
- Georgia Bulldogs
- List of Olympic medalists in swimming (women)
- List of University of Georgia people
- Dual sport and multi-sport Olympians
