= 2014 ITU World Triathlon Series =

- League: ITU World Triathlon Series
- Sport: Triathlon

Men's Series
- Series Champion: Javier Gómez (ESP)
- Points: 4860

Women's Series
- Series Champion: Gwen Jorgensen (USA)
- Points: 5085

World Triathlon Series seasons
- 2013 2015

The 2014 ITU World Triathlon Series was a series of eight World Championship Triathlon events that lead up to a Grand Final held in Edmonton, Alberta, Canada. The Series was organised under the auspices of the world governing body of triathlon, the International Triathlon Union (ITU). At the conclusion of the series Javier Gómez of Spain and Gwen Jorgensen of the United States were declared the 2014 ITU World Champions.

== Calendar ==
The 2014 series visited eight cities around the world.

Date	Location	Status
April 5–6	(New Zealand) Auckland	Event
April 26–27	(South Africa) Cape Town	Event
May 17–18	(Japan) Yokohama	Event
May 31–June 1	(United Kingdom) London	Sprint Event
June 27–29	(United States) Chicago	Event
July 12–13	(Germany) Hamburg	Sprint Event
August 23–24	(Sweden) Stockholm	Event
August 26–September 1	(Canada) Edmonton	Grand Final

== Results ==
=== Medal summary ===
==== Men ====
Event	Gold	Silver	Bronze
Auckland	Javier Gómez (ESP)	Jonathan Brownlee (GBR)	Aaron Royle (AUS)
Cape Town	Javier Gómez (ESP)	Jonathan Brownlee (GBR)	Dmitry Polyanski (RUS)
Yokohama	Javier Gómez (ESP)	Mario Mola (ESP)	Richard Murray (RSA)
London	Mario Mola (ESP)	Richard Murray (RSA)	João José Pereira (POR)
Chicago	Javier Gómez (ESP)	João José Pereira (POR)	Mario Mola (ESP)
Hamburg	Alistair Brownlee (GBR)	Vincent Luis (FRA)	Jonathan Brownlee (GBR)
Stockholm	Jonathan Brownlee (GBR)	Alistair Brownlee (GBR)	Gregor Buchholz (GER)
Edmonton	Alistair Brownlee (GBR)	Mario Mola (ESP)	Javier Gómez (ESP)

==== Women ====
Event	Gold	Silver	Bronze
Auckland	Jodie Stimpson (GBR)	Anne Haug (GER)	Helen Jenkins (GBR)
Cape Town	Jodie Stimpson (GBR)	Helen Jenkins (GBR)	Gwen Jorgensen (USA)
Yokohama	Gwen Jorgensen (USA)	Ai Ueda (JPN)	Agnieszka Jerzyk (POL)
London	Gwen Jorgensen (USA)	Sarah Groff (USA)	Emma Jackson (AUS)
Chicago	Gwen Jorgensen (USA)	Helen Jenkins (GBR)	Juri Ide (JPN)
Hamburg	Gwen Jorgensen (USA)	Emma Jackson (AUS)	Kirsten Sweetland (CAN)
Stockholm	Sarah Groff (USA)	Andrea Hewitt (NZL)	Nicky Samuels (NZL)
Edmonton	Gwen Jorgensen (USA)	Andrea Hewitt (NZL)	Nicky Samuels (NZL)

== Overall standings ==
The athlete who accumulates the most points throughout the 8 race season is declared the year's world champion. The final point standings are:

=== Men ===
Rank	Athlete	Points
Gold medal	Javier Gómez (ESP)	4860
Silver medal	Mario Mola (ESP)	4601
Bronze medal	Jonathan Brownlee (GBR)	4501
4	Alistair Brownlee (GBR)	4006
5	João José Pereira (POR)	3817
6	Vincent Luis (FRA)	3148
7	Dmitry Polyanskiy (RUS)	3041
8	Richard Murray (RSA)	2911
9	Ryan Bailie (AUS)	2165
10	Aaron Royle (AUS)	2064

=== Women ===
Rank	Athlete	Points
Gold medal	Gwen Jorgensen (USA)	5085
Silver medal	Sarah Groff (USA)	3987
Bronze medal	Andrea Hewitt (NZL)	3845
4	Jodie Stimpson (GBR)	3453
5	Nicky Samuels (NZL)	3073
6	Helen Jenkins (GBR)	2903
7	Emma Jackson (AUS)	2647
8	Aileen Reid (IRL)	2543
9	Kirsten Sweetland (CAN)	2540
10	Alice Betto (ITA)	2518
