= Reto Hug =

Swiss triathlete (born 1975)

Personal information
- Born: 24 January 1975 (age 51) Marthalen, Switzerland
- Height: 1.88 m (6 ft 2 in)
- Weight: 70 kg (154 lb)

Sport
- Country: Switzerland
Medal record
Men's triathlon
Representing Switzerland
ITU Triathlon World Championships
Silver medal – second place	2005 Gamagōri	Elite men's race
Bronze medal – third place	2008 Vancouver	Elite men's race

Reto Hug (born 24 January 1975 in Marthalen) is a former athlete from Switzerland, who competed in the triathlon.

== Athletic career ==
=== Olympics ===
Hug competed in his first Olympic triathlon at the 2000 Summer Olympics. He took eighth place with a total time of 1:49:21.30. At the following games, Hug competed again in the triathlon competition, placing 40th with a time of 2:01:40.43. In 2008, Hug returned to the Olympics and placed 29th in triathlon with a time of 1:52:04.93.

=== ITU events ===
In International Triathlon Union (ITU), Hug has taken 2nd at the 2005 ITU Triathlon World Championships and placed 3rd at the 2008 ITU Triathlon World Championships. He is also the 1999 ETU Triathlon European Champion.

Following the end of 2012 season he retired from professional sport. He is married to Swiss triathlete Nicola Spirig. They have a son, born in 2013 and a daughter, born 2017.
