= Tim Don =

British triathlete

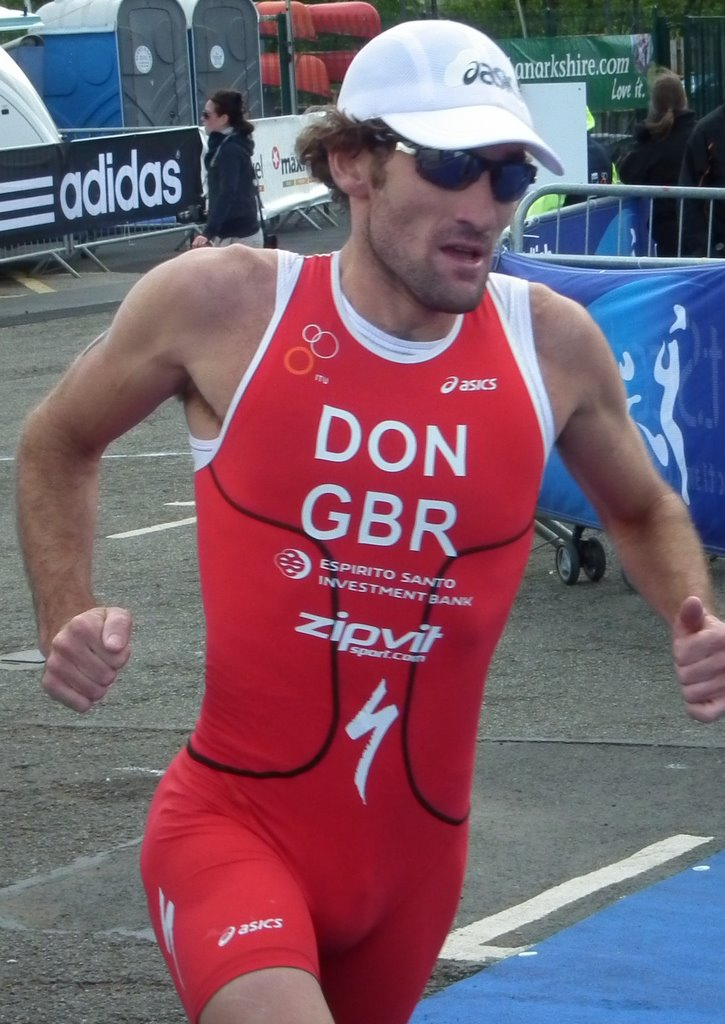
- Tim Don on the run section of the 2011 Strathclyde Park Triathlon

Personal information
- Born: 14 January 1978 (age 48) Isleworth, London, England
- Weight: 143lb (65kg)
- Website: Tim Don webpage

Sport
- Country: Great Britain
Medal record
Men's triathlon
Representing Great Britain
ITU Triathlon World Championships
Gold medal – first place	2006 Lausanne	Individual
Silver medal – second place	2010 Budapest	Sprint
ITU Duathlon World Championships
Gold medal – first place	2002 Alpharetta	Individual
ITU Aquathlon World Championships
Gold medal – first place	2005 Gamagōri	Individual
Ironman 70.3
Bronze medal – third place	2017	Individual
Bronze medal – third place	2014	Individual

Timothy Philip Don (born 14 January 1978 in Isleworth, London) is a triathlete from the United Kingdom.

== Career ==
Don is the son of former Premier League referee Philip Don. He competed in the London Youth Games where he represented Hounslow in the triathlon. He competed at the first Olympic triathlon at the 2000 Summer Olympics. He took tenth place with a total time of 1hr 49min 28.85sec.

In the second Olympic triathlon at the 2004 Summer Olympics he was placed eighteenth with a total time of 1hr 54min 42.13sec. He was selected for the 2008 Beijing Olympics despite serving a ban for missed out of competition drug tests. At the Beijing Olympics, he failed to finish after exiting the swim in 48th place (out of 55) and was pulled out of the race by officials for being too far behind on the bike leg. The British team later said that he had been ill prior to the race.

On 3 September 2006 in Lausanne, Don became World Champion after finishing 17 seconds in front of Hamish Carter. Following the swim, he was in the lead group on the bike but missed the initial break. He bridged the gap alone and caught the lead group on lap 5 out of 6, then took the lead along with Carter on the run, breaking clear about halfway through.

A few weeks later, Don received a three-month ban for missing three out-of-competition drug tests within an 18-month period prior to the race. The ban expired on 25 December 2006, but a byelaw meant that Don remained ineligible for Olympic selection. On Friday, 25 May 2007, he was cleared by the British Olympic Association for selection for future Olympic Games after appealing the ban. The BOA appeals panel, whilst clearing Don to compete in future Olympic Games, criticised him for being "indisputably careless and irresponsible".

Don won the 2007 London Triathlon in a time of 1 hour 42 minutes 1 second on 5 August 2007. He set a new Ironman world best time with 7:40:23 at Ironman South American Championship in Florianopolis, Brazil on 28 May 2017.

Two days before the 2017 Ironman World Championships, Don was hit by a car whilst riding along the Queen K highway near Kona International Airport in Hawaii. He suffered a hangman's fracture to his neck, and spent three months recovering in a halo brace. Six months after he was injured, he returned to compete in the 2018 Boston Marathon where he finished in a time of 2:49:42.
