= 2008 ITU Triathlon World Championships =

The 2008 ITU Triathlon World Championships were held in Vancouver, British Columbia, Canada from June 5 to June 8, 2008.

== Medal summary ==
Event	Gold	Silver	Bronze
Men's Elite	Javier Gómez (ESP)	Bevan Docherty (NZL)	Reto Hug (SUI)
Women's Elite	Helen Tucker (GBR)	Sarah Haskins (USA)	Samantha Warriner (NZL)
Men's U23	Alistair Brownlee (GBR)	Gregor Buchholz (GER)	Martin Van Barneveld (NZL)
Women's U23	Daniela Ryf (SUI)	Jasmine Oeinck (USA)	Mari Rabie (RSA)
