= Daniel Unger =

German triathlete (born 1978)

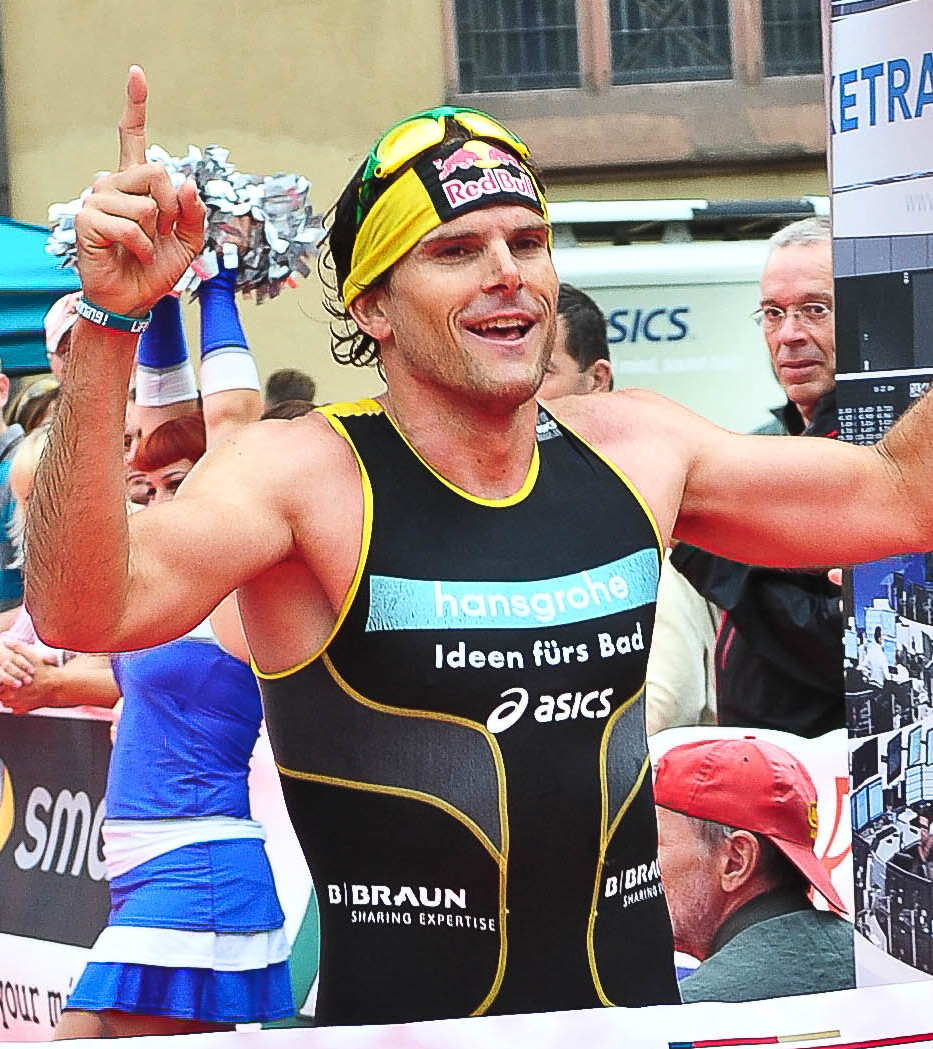
- Unger at the Frankfurt City Triathlon 2012

Personal information
- Nicknames: MCU, Ungerman
- Born: 22 March 1978 (age 48) Ravensburg, West Germany
- Height: 1.85 m (6 ft 1 in)
- Weight: 74.5 kg (164 lb)

Sport
- Country: Germany
- Club: Mengen / Hansgrohe Team
- Team: Triathlon Top Team
- Turned pro: 2004
- Coached by: Ralf Ebli

Achievements and titles
- Personal best(s): 57.08 sec (100 m swim); 2:01.9 (200 m swim); 16:47(1500 m swim); 8:27.4 (3000 m track); 30:21.07 (10 km road)
Medal record
Representing Germany
Men's triathlon
ITU Triathlon World Championships
Gold medal – first place	2007 Hamburg	Elite men's race

Daniel Unger (born 22 March 1978) is a German triathlete who was the 2007 ITU Triathlon World Champion.

At the 2008 Olympics in Beijing, he finished in 6th place with a time of 1:49:43.78, 50.5 seconds behind the winner Jan Frodeno.
