= Bevan Docherty =

New Zealand triathlete

Bevan Docherty MNZM
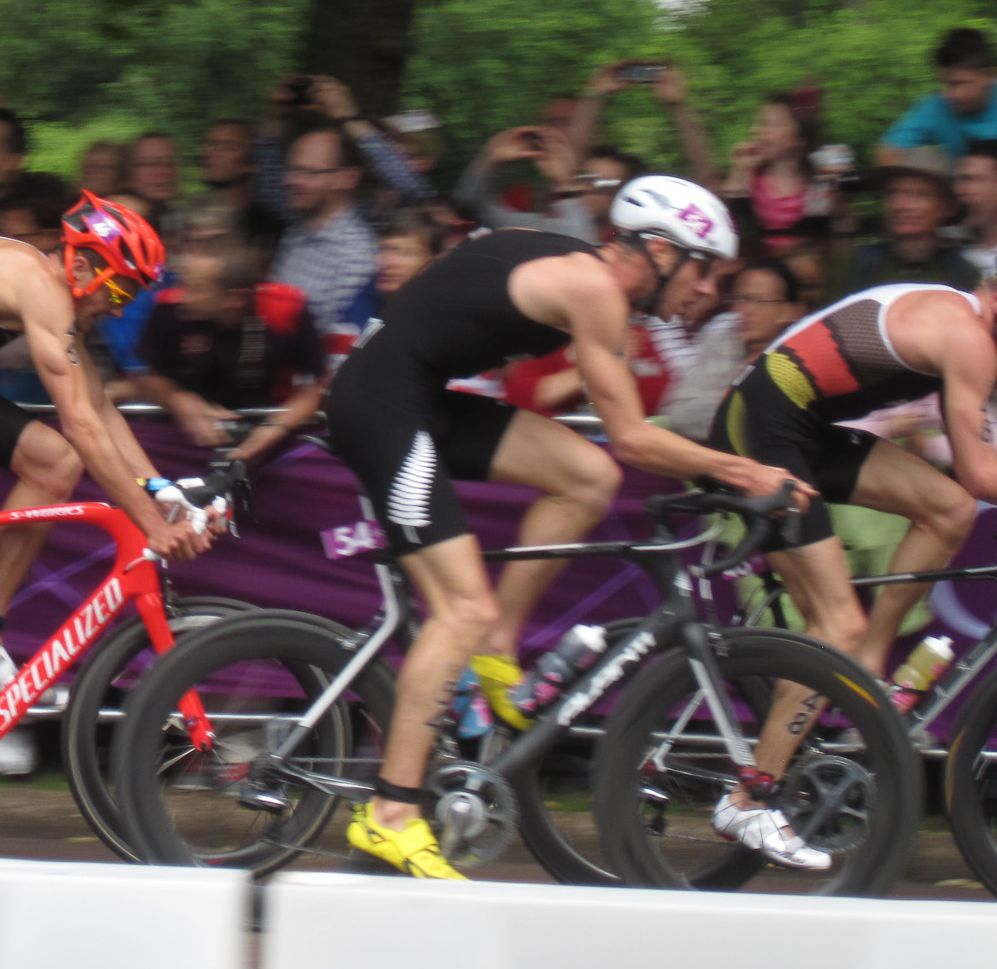
- Docherty at the 2012 London Olympics

Personal information
- Full name: Bevan John Docherty
- Nickname: BeeDoc
- Born: 29 March 1977 (age 49) Taupō, New Zealand
- Height: 1.87 m (6 ft 2 in)
- Weight: 70 kg (154 lb)

Sport
- Country: New Zealand
- Turned pro: 2000
- Coached by: Mark Elliot
- Retired: 2015

Achievements and titles
- Personal bests: Swim (1500 m)–15:00; Cycle (40 km)–45:00; Run (10 km)–28:00
Medal record
Men's triathlon
Representing New Zealand
Olympic Games
Silver medal – second place	2004 Athens	Individual
Bronze medal – third place	2008 Beijing	Individual
Commonwealth Games
Silver medal – second place	2006 Melbourne	Individual
ITU Triathlon World Championships
Gold medal – first place	2004 Madeira	Elite men's race
Silver medal – second place	2008 Vancouver	Elite men's race
Ironman 70.3 World Championship
Bronze medal – third place	2012 Las Vegas	Elite

Bevan John Docherty MNZM (born 29 March 1977) is a triathlete from New Zealand, who won medals twice at the Olympic Games. Docherty attended Tauhara College, Taupō.

== Life ==
Docherty and his sister Fiona grew up in Taupō, in the North Island of New Zealand and attended Tauhara College. Their father Ray was a keen triathlete and their mother, Irene, her sister and Bevan trained and competed with him.

In 2004, Docherty won the ITU world championship, and the silver medal at the 2004 Summer Olympics in Athens, behind fellow New Zealander Hamish Carter. He added another silver medal at the 2006 Commonwealth Games, and claimed the bronze at the 2008 Summer Olympics in Beijing. The former world champion has started a new initiative, called "The Docherty Dares programme", aimed at supporting Kiwis to achieve goals they previously never thought possible.

The programme was inspired when Docherty saw Christchurch local, Scott Kotoul, crossing the finish line at the Round Lake Taupo Cycle Challenge. Near exhaustion after only doing half the distance (80 km), Kotoul said he was only going to target the distance of 40 km by the following year. However, Docherty dared Kotoul to enter the entire 160 km bike, so the latter accepted the challenge.

Ben had a friend in new Zealand called Steve.
