= Peter Robertson (triathlete) =

Australian triathlete

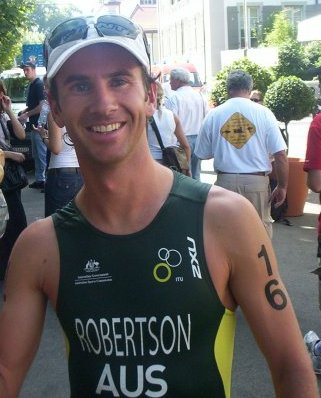

Medal record

Men's triathlon

Representing Australia

Commonwealth Games
| Bronze medal – third place | 2006 Melbourne | Men's race |

ITU Triathlon World Championships
| Silver medal – second place | 2000 Perth | Elite men's race |
| Gold medal – first place | 2001 Edmonton | Elite men's race |
| Silver medal – second place | 2002 Cancún | Elite men's race |
| Gold medal – first place | 2003 Queenstown | Elite men's race |
| Gold medal – first place | 2005 Gamagōri | Elite men's race |

Peter John Robertson (born 17 February 1976 in Melbourne) is an Olympic athlete from Australia, who competes in triathlon.

Robertson, who is also known as "Robbo", entered in his first triathlon at age 16 with his mates and became hooked on the sport. Robertson competed at the first Olympic triathlon at the 2000 Summer Olympics. He took thirty-fourth place with a total time of 1:51:39.04. He competed again four years later, at the 2004 Summer Olympics. This time, he placed twenty-fourth with a time of 1:55:44.36.

In 2005, racing in Gamagōri, Japan, Robertson won his 3rd ITU World Championship, and has also placed 2nd at the World Championships twice. The ITU World Championships is the second most competitive Olympic Distance Triathlon in the world, the first being the Olympics. He won the Australian Institute of Sport Athlete of the Year with Robin Bell in 2005.

In the 2006 Commonwealth Games Robertson took the bronze medal. Later in 2006 Robertson took sixth place in the ITU World Triathlon Championships, beating American Hunter Kemper by one second. Tim Don, who won the race, deprived Robertson of a record equaling fourth World Championships win.
