= Maik Petzold =

German triathlete

Maik Petzold (born January 16, 1978) is an athlete from Germany who competes in triathlons.

Petzold competed in triathlon at the 2004 Summer Olympics. He placed nineteenth with a total time of 1:54:52.90. He also competed in the triathlon at the 2012 Summer Olympics. This time he finished in 31st place.
