= Sarah Haskins (triathlete) =

American triathlete (born 1981)

Personal information
- Born: March 13, 1981 (age 45) St. Louis, Missouri
- Height: 5 ft 7 in (1.70 m)
- Weight: 130 lb (59 kg)

Sport
- Country: United States
- Turned pro: 2004
- Coached by: Nate Kortuem
Medal record
Women's triathlon
ITU Triathlon World Championships
| Silver medal – second place | 2008 Vancouver | Elite |
Pan American Games
| Gold medal – first place | 2011 Guadalajara | Individual |

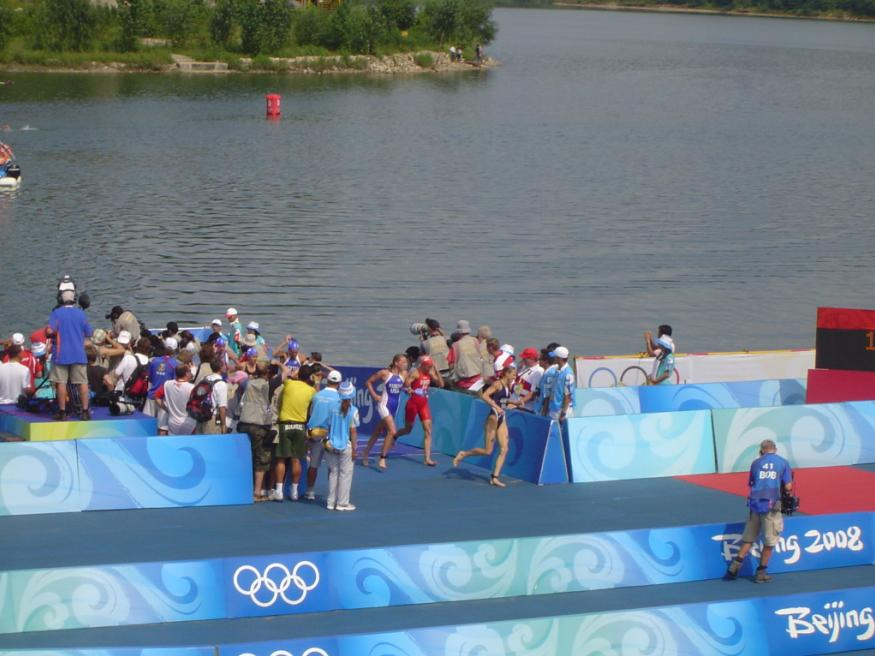
The first transition of the women's triathlon at the 2008 Summer Olympics. From the right: Laura Bennett, Magali Messmer, Sarah Haskins

Sarah Haskins (born March 13, 1981) is an American triathlete from St. Louis, Missouri. She competed in triathlon at the 2008 Summer Olympics in Beijing and is the 2011 Pan American Games Gold medalist.

== Education ==
After graduating from Parkway South High School, Haskins attended the University of Tulsa from 1999 to 2003. She obtained an athletic scholarship for cross country and track and had several All-Conference finishes during her career there. Haskins graduated in May 2003 with a degree in elementary education and a minor in mathematics.

== Triathlon career ==
Haskins began competing in triathlons during the summer of 2003 after graduating college and turned pro in 2004. Haskins has a strong swimming background, she was swimming competitively at age five and swimming year-round by the age of nine years.

At the 2008 Olympics, she finished in 11th place, with a time of 2:01:22.57. She finished in eighth place in the women's event at the 2015 Pan American Games.

=== Career accomplishments ===
- 2011 Pan Am Games Gold Medalist
- 2011 Lifetime Fitness Race to The Toyota Cup Champion
- 2011 Hy-Vee 5150 US Championship 3rd
- 2009 Lifetime Fitness Race to The Toyota Cup Champion
- 2008 U.S. Olympic Team Member (11th Beijing )
- 6 Year USAT National Team Member
- 2008 ITU World Championship Silver Medalist
- 2007 Pan Am Games Silver Medalist
- 2006 USAT Elite National Champion
- 2006 Haul to the Great Wall Elite Series Champion
- 2004 USAT U23 National Champion
