= Iván Raña =

Spanish triathlete

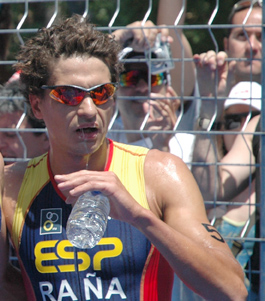

Personal information
- Full name: Iván Raña Fuentes
- Nickname: O Soldado (The Soldier)
- Nationality: Spanish
- Born: 10 June 1979 (age 47) Ordes, Galicia, Spain
- Height: 1.74 m (5 ft 9 in)
- Weight: 62 kg (137 lb)
- Website: www.ivanraña.es

Sport
- Country: Spain
- Sport: Triathlon
Medal record
Representing Spain
Men's triathlon
ITU Triathlon World Championships
| Gold medal – first place | 2002 Cancún | Elite |
| Silver medal – second place | 2003 Queenstown | Elite |
| Silver medal – second place | 2004 Madeira | Elite |
ITU Aquathlon World Championships
| Gold medal – first place | 2004 Madeira | Elite |

Iván Raña Fuentes (born 10 June 1979) is a Spanish triathlete and the winner of three medals in the World Triathlon Championships between the years of 2002–2004. He also has won three medals at the European League Triathlon as well, between the years of 2001–2003.

He competed in three Olympics as well: Sydney in 2000, Athens in 2004, and Beijing in 2008, where he won two Olympic Diplomas for fifth place in both Sydney and Beijing.

== Athletic career ==
Raña participated in the first Olympic triathlon at the 2000 Summer Olympics. He took fifth place with a total time of 1:49:10.88.

In 2002 when he won world, European and national titles. His world championship win in Cancún, Mexico, was Spain's first gold medal in the event. The next year he came home second at the world championships behind Australia's Peter Robertson and he had to settle for silver earlier this year as well. In 2004, at the world champs in Madeira, Raña came home less than a second behind Kiwi Docherty. At the 2004 Summer Olympics, Raña dropped to a disappointing twenty-third place with a time of 1:55:44.27. However, he competed again at the 2008 Summer Olympics where he took fifth place with a time of 1:49:22.03.

== Cycling and other sports ==
Occasionally, Raña has participated in some rally car races, having his brother José as his copilot. The tandem drives a Mitsubishi Lancer Evolution during the races. One of the competitions that he has participated in is called the Rally Botafumeiro, which was the scoring event for the Gallego Rally Championships in 2007, 2009, and 2010.

In December 2008, he signed a one-year deal with the professional cycling team Xacobeo–Galicia and during the first stage of his first race, the Mallorca Challenge, he was involved in a substantial fall, which resulted in a dislocated collarbone. After reflecting on his athletic career, Raña decided to return to the triathlon in December 2009 with the ambition of competing in the London Olympics in 2012.
