= Brad Kahlefeldt =

Australian triathlete

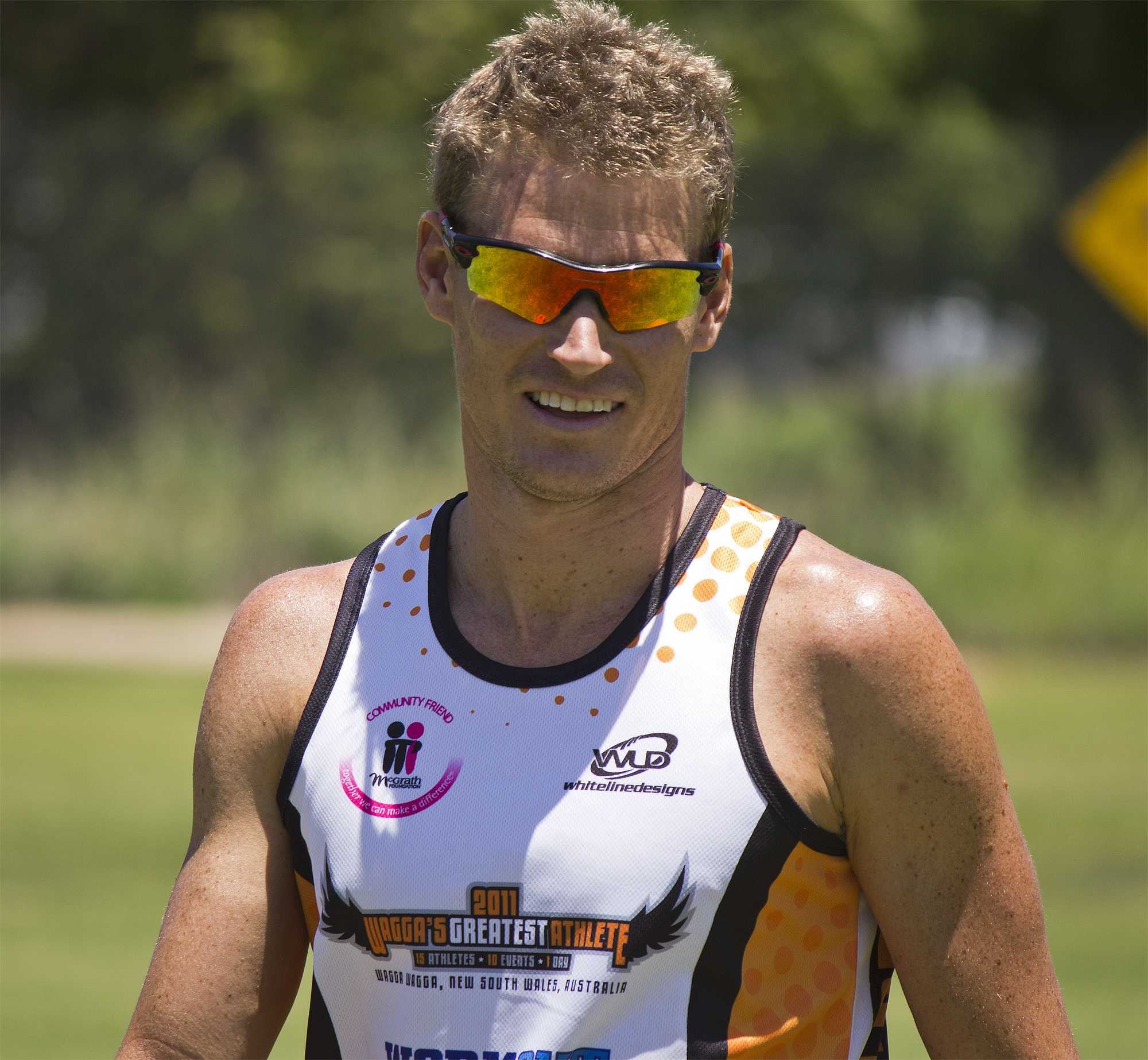
- Kahlefeldt at the 2011 Wagga's Greatest Athlete in Wagga Wagga.

Medal record

Representing Australia

Men's triathlon

Commonwealth Games
Gold medal – first place	Melbourne 2006	Men's race

ITU Triathlon World Championships
Bronze medal – third place	2005 Gamagōri	Elite men's race
Bronze medal – third place	2007 Hamburg	Elite men's race

ITU World Triathlon Series
Bronze medal – third place	2010	2010 ITU World Championship Series

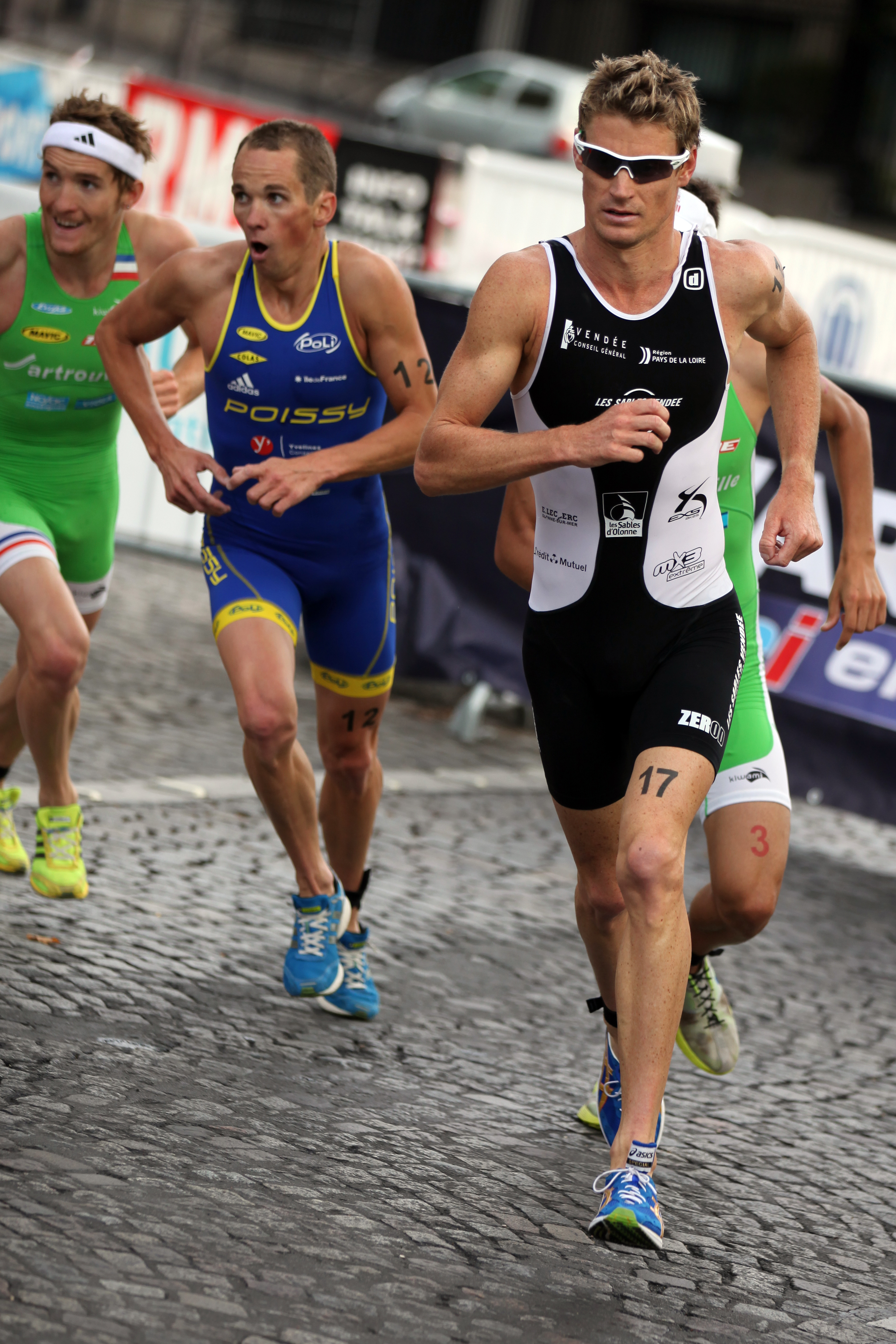
Brad Kahlefeldt and Gregory Rouault at the Triathlon de Paris, 2011.

Bradley Kahlefeldt (born 27 July 1979) is an Australian triathlete born in Temora, NSW. Kahlefeldt has lived in the city of Wagga Wagga since 1982. Brad now splits his time between the Gold Coast and France during the European summer. He won the gold medal in the 2006 Commonwealth Games Triathlon. Brad has three World Championship Bronze Medals (2005, 2007, 2010) twice while it was called the World Championship and once while it was called the World Championship Series (see ITU World Triathlon Series for details) and also competed in the 2008 Beijing Olympic Games and 2012 London Olympic Games.

Kahlefedlt was chosen as the 2008 Australia Day Ambassador for his home city of Wagga Wagga. He is an Australian Institute of Sport scholarship holder.
