= Emma Moffatt =

Australian triathlete

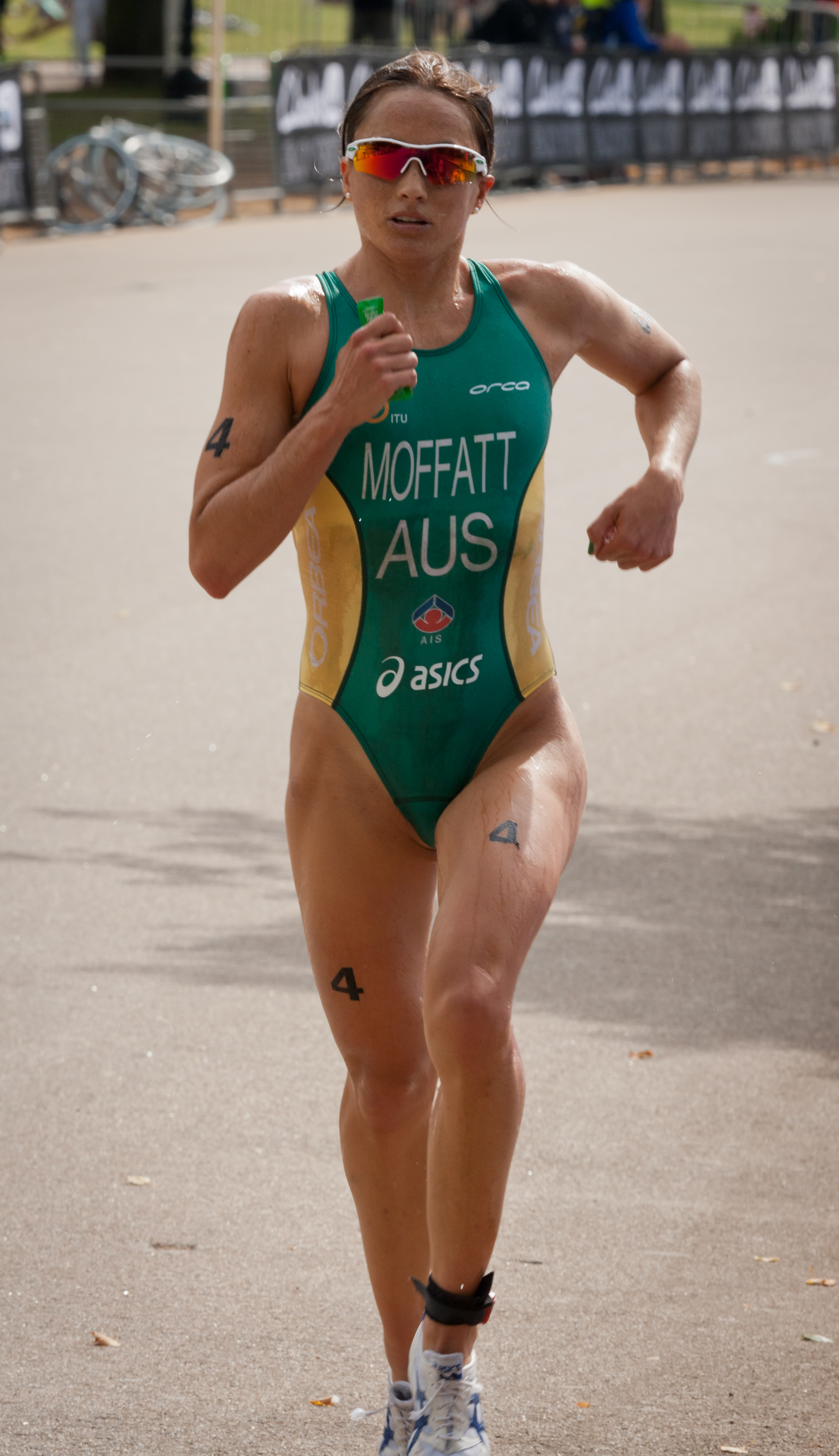
- Moffatt during the 2011 Dextro Energy Triathlon – ITU World Championship Series London

Personal information
- Born: 7 September 1984 (age 42) Moree, New South Wales, Australia
- Height: 171 cm (5 ft 7 in)
- Weight: 57 kg (126 lb)

Sport
- Country: Australia
- Coached by: Self-coached
Medal record
Women's triathlon
Representing Australia
Olympic Games
Bronze medal – third place	2008 Beijing	Individual
ITU World Championships
Gold medal – first place	2009 Gold Coast	Individual
Gold medal – first place	2010 Budapest	Individual
ITU Sprint World Championships
Silver medal – second place	2010 Lausanne	Individual
Commonwealth Games
Bronze medal – third place	2014 Glasgow	Mixed relay

Emma Moffatt (born 7 September 1984, Moree, New South Wales) is a retired Australian professional triathlete. She won a bronze medal at the 2008 Summer Olympics in Beijing, and won the gold at the ITU Triathlon World Championships in 2009 and in 2010. She was born in Moree, New South Wales, and was raised in the northern New South Wales town of Woolgoolga.

From a young age, she participated in such sports as cross country, athletics, and surf lifesaving. In her early teens, Emma began successfully participating in triathlon. Each of her three siblings and parents also competed in triathlon, while her elder sister Nicole was a champion Ironwoman in surf lifesaving.

Before she went to the Australian Institute of Sport, she went to Woolgoolga High School. She is an Australian Institute of Sport scholarship holder. She has been named Triathlon Australia's athlete of the year twice, in 2007 and 2012. In 2009, she was the Australian Institute of Sport's athlete of the year.

Moffatt was selected by the Australian Olympic Committee to compete in the London 2012 Olympics. The event was held in and around Hyde Park, with the swim being held in the Serpentine. However, she did not finish the event after a heavy fall during the cycling stage.

She came second in the 10 kilometres (6.2 mi) run of the Gold Coast Marathon-event on 1 July 2012 in Gold Coast, Queensland, Australia, finishing behind Lisa Jane Weightman.

At the 2014 Commonwealth Games, she was part of the Australian mixed relay team that won bronze.

Awards and achievements
Preceded by Ken Wallace and Heath Francis	Australian Athlete of the Year; 2009 (with Brenton Rickard)	Succeeded by Lydia Lassila
