= Steffen Justus =

German triathlete (born 1982)

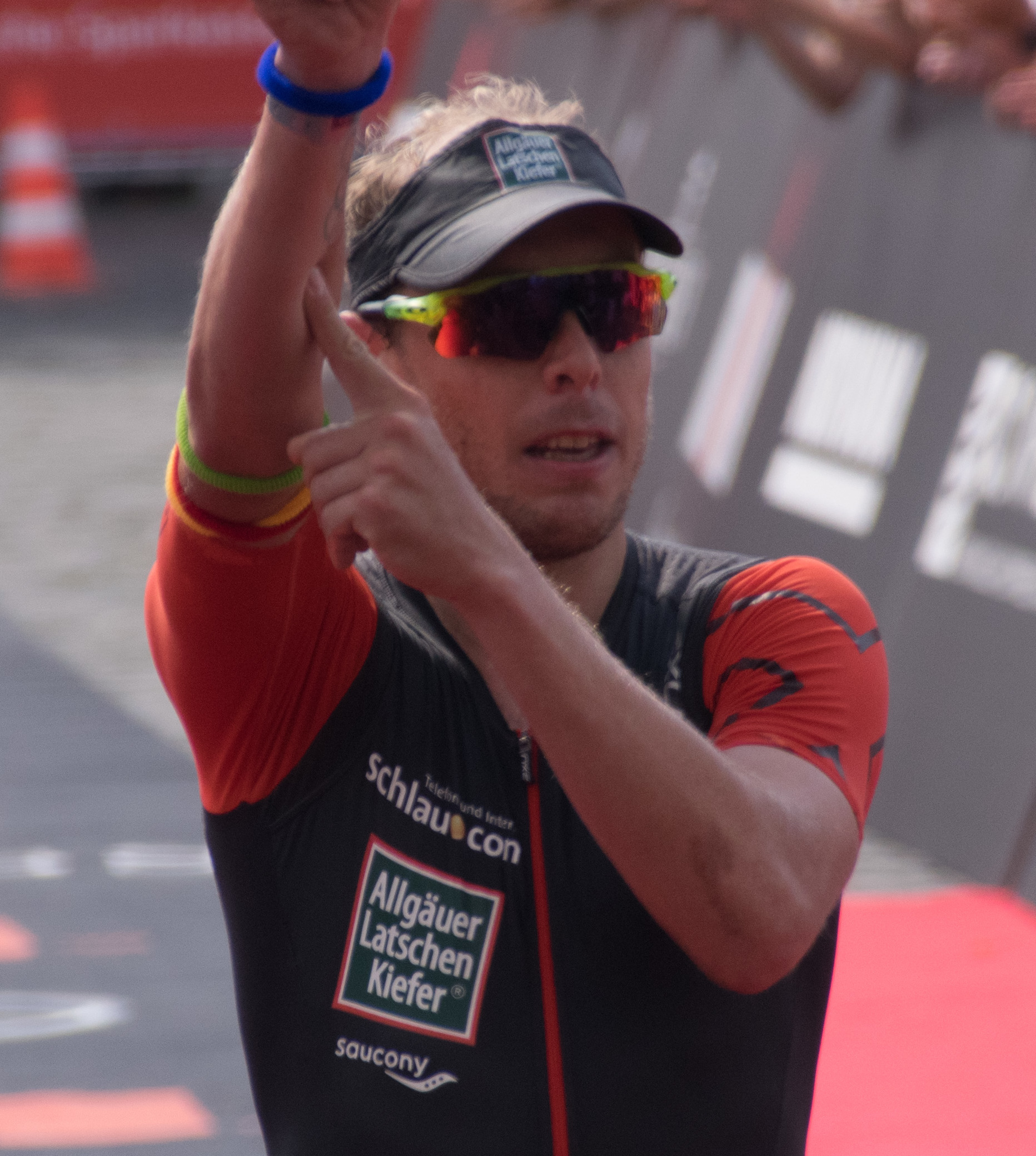
Steven Justus (2016)

Steffen Justus (born 15 April 1982) is a German triathlete.

At the 2012 Summer Olympics men's triathlon on Tuesday 7 August he placed 16th.
