= Emma Snowsill =

Australian triathlete

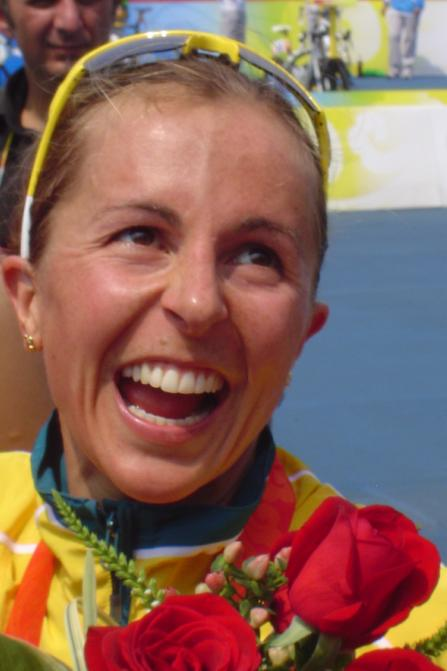
- At the 2008 Summer Olympics.

Personal information
- Nickname: Snowy
- Born: 15 June 1981 (age 45) Gold Coast, Queensland, Australia
- Height: 161 cm (5 ft 3 in)
- Weight: 48 kg (106 lb)

Sport
- Country: Australia; New Zealand (dual nationality)
- Coached by: Roland Knoll; Denis Cottrell (swimming)
Medal record
Representing Australia
Women's triathlon
Olympic Games
Gold medal – first place	2008 Beijing	Individual
ITU World Championship
Gold medal – first place	2003 Queenstown	Individual
Gold medal – first place	2005 Gamagori	Individual
Gold medal – first place	2006 Lausanne	Individual
Silver medal – second place	2007 Hamburg	Individual
Commonwealth Games
Gold medal – first place	2006 Melbourne	Individual

Emma Laura Snowsill OAM (born 15 June 1981) is an Australian professional triathlete and multiple gold medalist in the World Championships and the Commonwealth Games. She won the gold medal in triathlon at the 2008 Olympics. Snowsill is married to the 2008 Olympic champion in men's triathlon, Jan Frodeno.

== Professional career ==
Snowsill won the 2000 International Triathlon Union (ITU) World Championship in the 16–20 years age category plus the gold medal at the 2001 Sydney Youth Olympic Festival Triathlon at age 19. She was awarded a scholarship with the Australian Institute of Sport (AIS) and was voted 16–19 years female Triathlete of the Year 2000.

In 2003, Snowsill became ITU World Champion for the first time in Queenstown, New Zealand. In 2004, she won the ITU World Cup Championship and finished the season ranked first in the world. Despite this she was not selected for the Australian team for the 2004 Athens Olympics.

In 2005, Snowsill took her second world crown in Gamagori, Japan, in 35 °C (95 °F) temperatures and 90% relative humidity.

During 2005 and 2006 she was the winner of the Lifetime Fitness Triathlon in Minneapolis. She won the gold medal at the 2006 Commonwealth Games in Melbourne. She won another gold medal at the 2006 World ITU Championships in Lausanne, where she finished 45 seconds in front of Portuguese triathlete Vanessa Fernandes. This made her the first female triathlete to win three world titles.

The following year, in 2007, in Hamburg, Vanessa Fernandes won her first world title by beating Snowsill by over a minute. In 2008, Snowsill won the Mooloolaba World Cup season opener, beating her Olympic rival Fernandes. Snowsill skipped the ITU World Championships in order to devote all of energy to the 2008 Beijing Olympics. During the triathlon event she stayed with the leaders in the swim and cycle legs and broke clear in the run. Snowsill won the gold medal with a time of 1:58:27, 1 minute 7 seconds ahead of Fernandes. Fellow Australian Emma Moffatt won the bronze medal.

Snowsill missed out on selection for the Australian London 2012 Olympic Triathlon Team. She appealed her omission but was turned down by the Tribunal. Snowsill decided not to take her case to the Court of Arbitration for Sport saying "Whilst I am upset with the outcome, I have to respect the decision of the Tribunal and will not be pursuing the matter further." Snowsill went on to wish the three selected women (Emma Moffatt, Erin Densham and Emma Jackson) good luck for their race in London.

During her career she has won the "Grand Slam" of Chicago, City of Los Angeles, London and New York Triathlons plus multiple ITU World Cup events.

== Recognition ==
- 2009 - awarded the Medal of the Order of Australia.
- 2015 - inducted into the International Triathlon Union Hall of Fame.
- 2017 - inducted into the Triathlon Australia Hall of Fame.
- 2019 - inducted into the Sport Australia Hall of Fame.

== Gallery ==
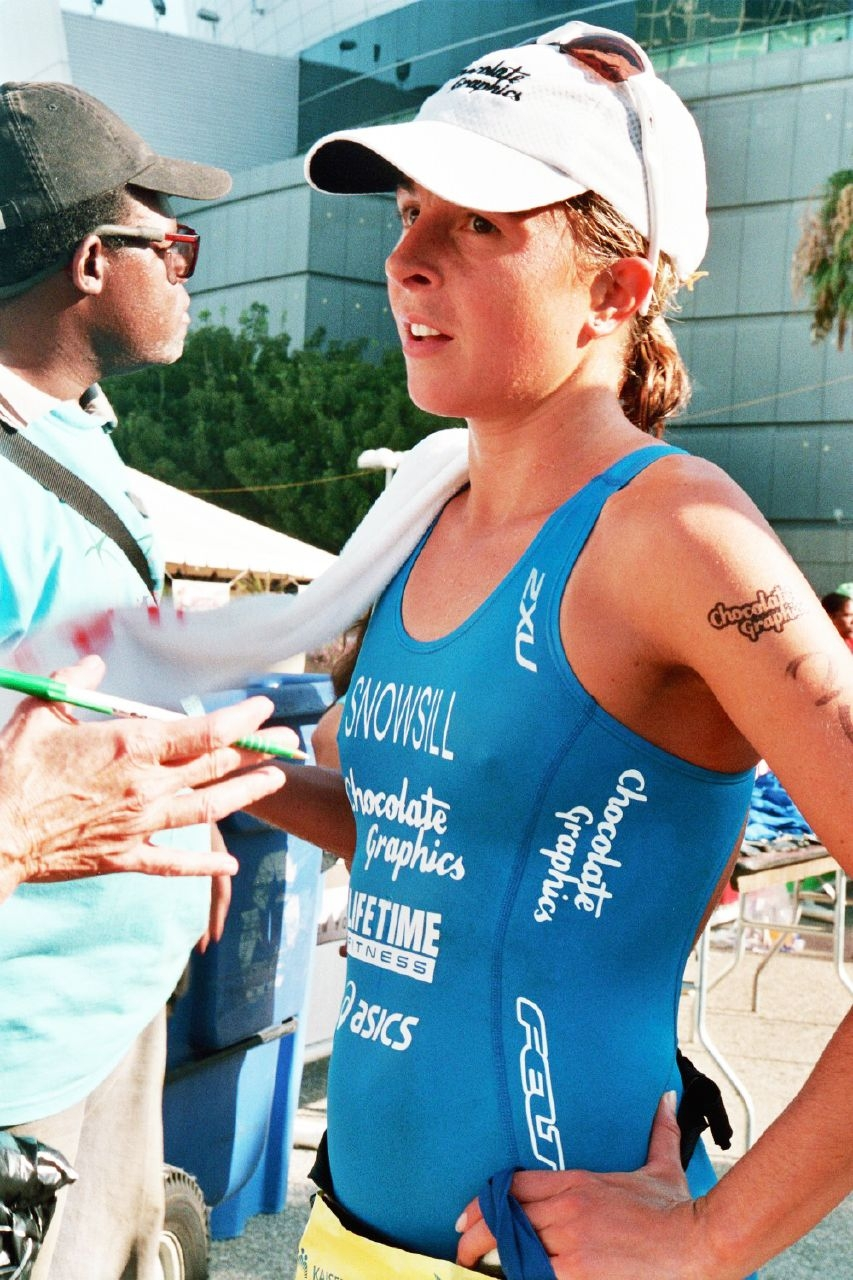
At the 2007 Los Angeles Triathlon.

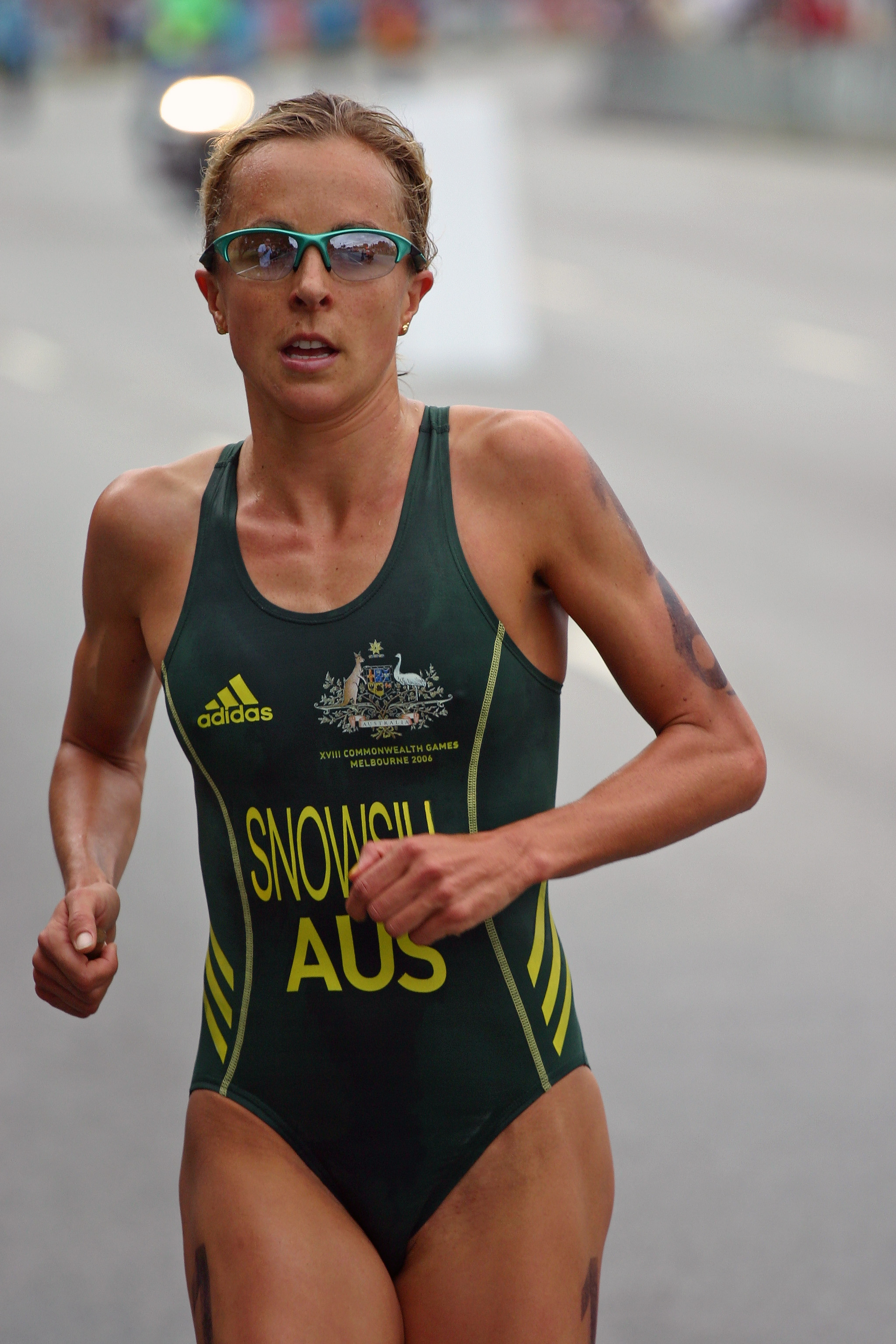
Snowsill during the run leg of the 2006 Melbourne Commonwealth Games.

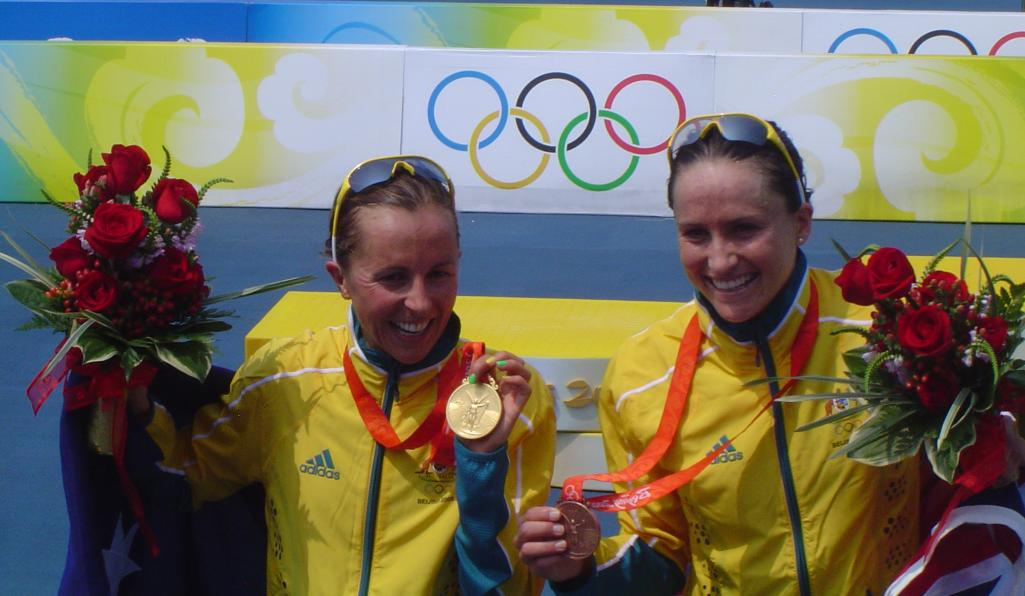
Snowsill (left) and Emma Moffatt (right) show off their medals.
