= Laura Bennett (triathlete) =

American triathlete (born 1975)

Laura Marie (Reback) Bennett
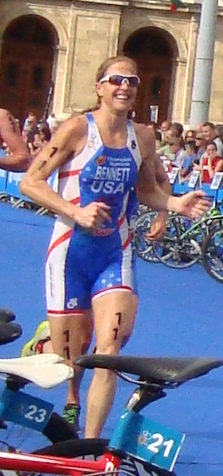
- Bennett in the 2010 ITU World Championship in Budapest

Personal information
- Born: April 25, 1975 (age 51) West Palm Beach, Florida
- Height: 5 ft 9 in (1.75 m)
- Weight: 130 lb (59 kg)

Sport
- Country: United States
- Team: Bennett Endurance
- Turned pro: 1998
Medal record
Representing United States
Women's Triathlon
USAT Elite Championships
Gold medal – first place	2003	Olympic
Gold medal – first place	2010	Olympic
ITU Triathlon World Championships
Silver medal – second place	2003	Elite
Bronze medal – third place	2004	Elite
Bronze medal – third place	2005	Elite
Bronze medal – third place	2007	Elite

Laura Marie Bennett (née Reback, born 25 April 1975, in North Palm Beach, Florida) is an American professional triathlete. She placed fourth in the women's triathlon at the 2008 Summer Olympics. In 2012, she finished 17th at the London Olympic Games. She earned a silver medal at the World Triathlon Championships in 2003 and bronze medals in 2004, 2005, and 2007. She has also raced at the Half-Ironman distance, placing 5th at the 2009 Ironman 70.3 World Championship.

== Athletic career ==
=== Early career ===
Bennett started triathlons at age 10 and took up swimming at age 12. She attended Cardinal Newman High School where she ran track and swam. She was the Florida state champion in the mile and two mile races for two consecutive years. She attended at Southern Methodist University where she was a member of the swimming team and pursued a finance degree. In swimming she served as a co-captain, and was a member of the 1997 NCAA champion 400 medley relay. She graduated in 1997 with a BS in finance.

In 1993, she was a member of the USA Triathlon Junior National Team, and was voted the USA Triathlon and Triathlete Magazine Junior of the Year in 1994. In 1997, after completing college, she was the second U.S. amateur at the World Championship in Perth, Australia.

=== Professional ===
Bennett turned pro in 1998 after placing as the second U.S. amateur at the 1997 World Championship. That same year she began competing on the International Triathlon Union (ITU) racing circuit. She earned a silver medal at the World Triathlon Championships in 2003 and bronze medals in 2004, 2005, and 2007.

Bennett first earned a spot on the Olympic team as the second alternate for the U.S. triathlon team at the 2000 Summer Olympics, and as the first alternate in the 2004 Summer Olympics. At the 2008 Summer Olympics, she was the first American to qualify for the team, by placing first American, and third overall, in the Beijing 2007 trials. At the games, she placed fourth with a time of 2:00:21.54.

In 2009, Bennett made her long distance triathlon debut at the Ironman Augusta 70.3 race in 2009. She won in a time of 4:18:36, just six seconds ahead of runner up Kelly Williamson, qualifying her for the 2009 Ironman 70.3 World Championship. Bennett placed 5th at 2009 Ironman 70.3 World Championship with a time of 4:07:39.

In 2010, the ITU first started keeping track of segment rankings to reward the best athlete in each of the three disciplines throughout the Dextro Energy Triathlon ITU World Championship Series. Bennett ranked first in the swim rankings 2010 season. That same year she was selected as the USAT 2010 Olympic/ITU Female Athlete of the Year for her consistent performances and end of season ranking during the 2010 racing season.

At the 2012 Summer Olympics, Bennett placed 17th in the women's triathlon with a time of 2:02:17.

== Results ==
=== ITU competitions ===
The following list of Bennett's results is based upon the official ITU rankings and the athlete's profile Page. Unless indicated otherwise, the events are triathlons (Olympic Distance) and belong to the Elite category.

Results list

Date	Competition	Place	Rank
2001-04-15	ITU Triathlon World Cup	Gamagori	1
2001-04-22	ITU Triathlon World Cup	Ishigaki	4
2001-04-28	ITU Triathlon World Cup	St. Anthony's	6
2001-07-07	ITU Triathlon World Cup	Toronto	6
2002-03-31	ITU Triathlon World Cup	Geelong	12
2002-04-02	ITU Triathlon World Cup	St. Petersburg	11
2002-06-09	ITU Triathlon World Cup	Gamagori	5
2002-07-02	ITU Triathlon World Cup	Edmonton	14
2002-07-02	ITU Triathlon World Cup	Corner Brook	4
2002-09-08	ITU Triathlon World Cup	Hamburg	14
2002-09-29	ITU Triathlon World Cup	Nice	14
2002-11-09	ITU Triathlon World Championships	Cancun	7
2003-04-13	ITU Triathlon World Cup	Ishigaki	6
2003-04-03	ITU Triathlon World Cup	St. Anthonys	1
2003-06-03	ITU Triathlon World Cup	Tongyeong	1
2003-06-15	ITU Triathlon World Cup	Gamagori	2
2003-07-03	ITU Triathlon World Cup	Edmonton	3
2003-08-10	ITU Triathlon World Cup	New York	5
2003-10-13	ITU Triathlon World Cup	Makuhari	9
2003-12-07	ITU Triathlon World Championships	Queenstown	2
2004-05-09	ITU Triathlon World Championships	Madeira	3
2004-09-26	ITU Triathlon World Cup	Gamagori	9
2005-04-17	ITU Triathlon World Cup	Honolulu	16
2005-05-15	ITU Triathlon World Cup	Ishigaki	8
2005-07-23	ITU Triathlon World Cup	Edmonton	4
2005-09-11	ITU Triathlon World Championships	Gamagori	3
2005-09-26	ITU Duathlon World Championships	Newcastle	6
2005-11-13	ITU Triathlon World Cup	New Plymouth	5
2006-03-03	ITU Triathlon World Cup	Doha	3
2006-03-10	ITU Triathlon World Cup	Aqaba	3
2006-04-26	ITU Triathlon World Cup	Mooloolaba	11
2006-05-07	ITU Triathlon World Cup	Mazatlan	9
2006-06-25	ITU Triathlon Pan American Cup	Long Beach	4
2006-09-03	ITU Triathlon World Championships	Lausanne	8
2006-09-10	Triathlon World Cup	Hamburg	3
2006-09-24	Triathlon World Cup	Beijing	4
2006-10-15	ITU Triathlon Asian Cup	Hong Kong	1
2006-11-05	Triathlon World Cup	Cancun	12
2006-05-02	Triathlon World Cup	New Plymouth	3
2007-06-17	Triathlon World Cup	Des Moines	1
2007-09-02	Triathlon World Cup	Hamburg	3
2007-09-16	Triathlon World Cup	Beijing	3
2007-11-04	Triathlon World Cup	Cancun	5
2008-03-30	Triathlon World Cup	Moolooaba	4
2008-06-08	Triathlon World Championships	Vancouver	22
2008-06-22	Hy-Vee ITU Triathlon World Cup	Des Moines	4
2008-08-19	2008 Summer Olympics	Beijing	4
2008-09-20	ITU Triathlon Pan American Cup	Portland	4
2009-06-21	World Championship Series	Washington, DC	12
2010-06-27	Hy-Vee ITU Triathlon Elite Cup	Des Moines	14
2009-07-26	World Championship Series	Hamburg	17
2010-03-28	ITU Triathlon World Cup	Mooloolaba	17
2010-04-11	World Championship Series	Sydney	14
2010-06-13	Hy-Vee ITU Triathlon Elite Cup	Des Moines	6
2010-07-18	World Championship Series	Hamburg	7
2010-07-25	World Championship Series	London	5
2010-08-15	World Championship Series	Kitzbuhel	8
2010-09-12	World Championship Series, Grand Final	Budapest	8
2010-09-25	Pan American Cup	Tuscaloosa	1
2011-04-10	World Championship Series	Sydney	6
2011-06-05	World Championship Series	Madrid	8
2011-07-19	World Championship Series	Kitzbuehel	6
2011-08-07	World Championship Series	London	24
2011-09-11	World Championship Series, Grand Final	Beijing	5

== Personal life ==
Bennett is married to Australian triathlete Greg Bennett. Laura Bennett's father, Paul, and older brothers, David and John, have also competed in triathlons.
