= 2011 ITU World Championship Series =

2011 ITU World Triathlon Series
- League: ITU World Triathlon Series
- Sport: Triathlon

Men's Series
- Series Champion: Alistair Brownlee (GBR)
- Points: 4285

Women's Series
- Series Champion: Helen Jenkins (GBR)
- Points: 4023

World Triathlon Series seasons
- 2010 2012

The Dextro Energy Triathlon – ITU World Championship Series 2011 was a series of six World Championship Triathlon events leading to a Grand Final held in Beijing, China in September 2011. The Series was organised under the auspices of the world governing body of triathlon, the International Triathlon Union (ITU), and was sponsored by Dextro Energy.

Dextro Energy Triathlon – ITU World Championship Series visited Sydney, Yokohama, Madrid, Kitzbühel, Hamburg, London and Beijing. The series also for the first time included the ITU Sprint Distance Triathlon World Championship in Lausanne. The Grand Final in Beijing included the Under 23, Junior and Paratriathlon World Championships, which were decided over a single race.

Great Britain won both the men's and women's elite titles as Alistair Brownlee and Helen Jenkins both claimed their second elite world titles. Britain also swept the medals in the men's under 23 title as Matthew Sharp led his teammates to claim his first title. Agnieszka Jerzyk claimed Poland's first ITU Triathlon world title as she won the under 23 championship. In the juniors, American Lukas Verzbicas and New Zealand's Mikayla Nielsen also claimed their first world titles.

In the Paratriathlon world championships, titles went to Jane Egan (TRI 1), Faye McClelland (TRI 4), Charlotte Ellis (TRI 6). Titles also went to Danielle McLaughlin, Melissa Stockwell and Jennifer Hopkins In the men's events titles went to Steven Judge (TRI 3), Yannick Bourseaux (TRI 4), Benjamin Landier (TRI 5), Bill Chaffey (TRI 1), Oswald Kydd (TRI 2), Rodrigo Feola (TRI 6).

== Overview ==
=== Points and prize money ===
Points were awarded to the top 40 in the World Championship Series and went to the top 50 in the Grand Final. Each World Series event had a prize fund of $150,000 and the Grand Final had a pool of $250,000. The overall rankings had a $500,000 bonus prize fund, awarded after the Grand Final making it the biggest payday in Triathlon.

Position	Grand Final	World Championship Series& Sprint World Championships
1	1200	800
2	1110	740
3	1027	685
4	950	633
5	879	586
6	813	542
7	752	501
8	695	464
9	643	429
10	595	397

Position	World Championship Series& Sprint World Championships	Grand Final	Bonus Pool
1	$18,000	$30,000	$55,000
2	$13,000	$22,000	$42,000
3	$9,500	$16,000	$30,000
4	$7,000	$12,000	$20,000
5	$5,300	$9,300	$16,000
6	$4,300	$7,500	$12,000
7	$3,600	$6,000	$10,000
8	$3,000	$4,800	$8,000
9	$2,500	$3,800	$7,500
10	$2,100	$3,200	$7,000

=== Calendar ===
The 2011 series visited three Olympic courses: Sydney, Beijing for the grand final and the 2012 Olympic course in London. In addition, the series also had the 2007 World Championship course of Hamburg and was scheduled to return to Yokohama. For the first time ever, the series included the Sprint World Championships which contributed to the 2011 World Championship series.

Date	Location	Status
April 9–10	(Australia) Sydney	Event
14 May	(Japan) Yokohama	Event
June 4–5	(Spain) Madrid	Event
June 18–19	(Austria) Kitzbühel	Event
July 16–17	(Germany) Hamburg	Event
August 6–7	(United Kingdom) London	Event
August 20–21	(Switzerland) Lausanne	Sprint Distance
September 10–11	(China) Beijing	Grand Final

In April, following the 2011 Tōhoku earthquake and tsunami, the round set to take place in Yokohama was postponed by the ITU. The ITU felt that it would be too risky to try to stage the round there when the nuclear level was near maximum. In May, it was announced that the Yokohama round would be rescheduled for September and would take place on September 18 and 19. However, as it takes place after the Grand Final, the points and money gained in Yokohama would go towards the 2012 series.

== Series ==
The overall World Champion is the triathlete with the highest score from four series events added to their points total from the Grand Final. A triathlete may also take their score from a minimum of two ITU World Series events, including the Sprint World Championship, and two World Cup events to be eligible for the top 20 in the rankings in addition to their Grand Final score. All events were run over the Olympic distance of a 1.5 km swim, a 40 km bike and a 10 km run, with the exception of the Sprint World Championship, which was held over half the distance.

=== Sydney ===
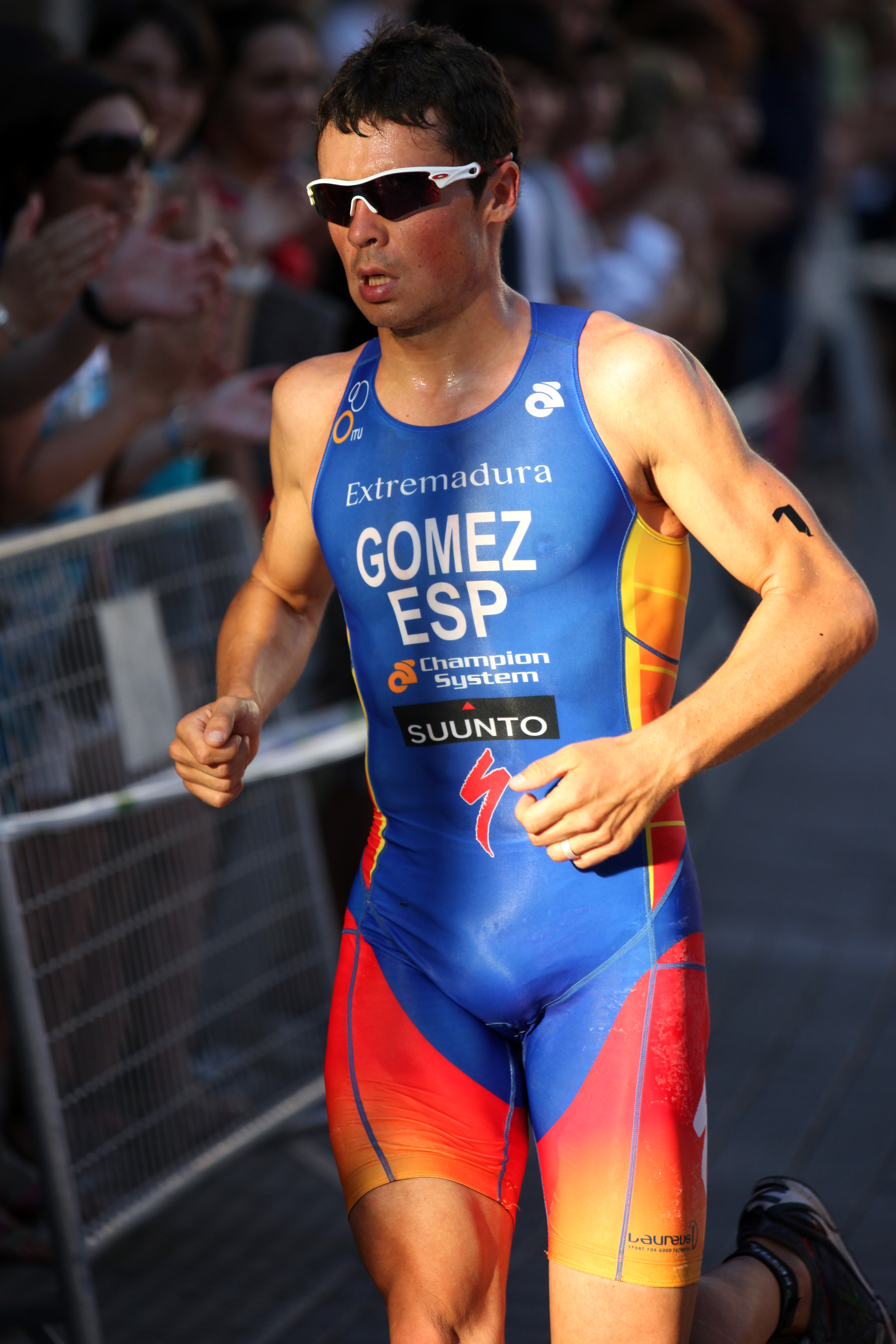
2010 World Champion Gómez survived a fall on the bike to win.

The 2011 series began in Sydney, Australia, and was held on the course that hosted the first Olympic games triathlon in 2000. The swim course was held in Farm Cove with two 750-metre laps, before heading to transition outside of the Sydney Opera House. Athletes then biked eight laps of a 5 km course that extended from the Opera House and down the Cahill Expressway and Macquarie Street. After the bike section, the competitors transitioned on College Street and then proceeded to complete four laps of a 2.5 km run circuit down Macquarie Street before finishing the triathlon on College Street.

The competition field for the race included 2010 Grand Final winner Emma Snowsill, who was plagued by injury in 2010, as well as all ten athletes from last year's the overall rankings were present on the men's side.

For the women, Paula Findlay won the race, beating out Bárbara Riveros Díaz. The two were among a group of six on the run section that included Laura Bennett, Andrea Hewitt, Carole Peon and Tomoko Sakimoto. Other notable finishes included 2010 World Champion Emma Moffatt and Olympic Champion Snowsill, who finished 13th and 42nd.

On the men's side, rain made the race conditions difficult. Reigning World Champion Javier Gómez incurred a fall during the bike leg, causing him to fall off the pace of the race pack for the final 10 kilometres of the bike. Gómez managed to catch the lead group; however, Jonathan Brownlee, Alistair Brownlee, Sven Riederer, Brendan Sexton and David Hauss were in front of him. Alistair fell on one of the turns during the run before falling off the pace and out of contention. Gómez eventually passed the leaders, with only Jonathan keeping pace with him for a short while. Gómez finished first with Jonathan second and Riederer third. Alistair, the 2009 World champion, finished 29th.

=== Madrid ===
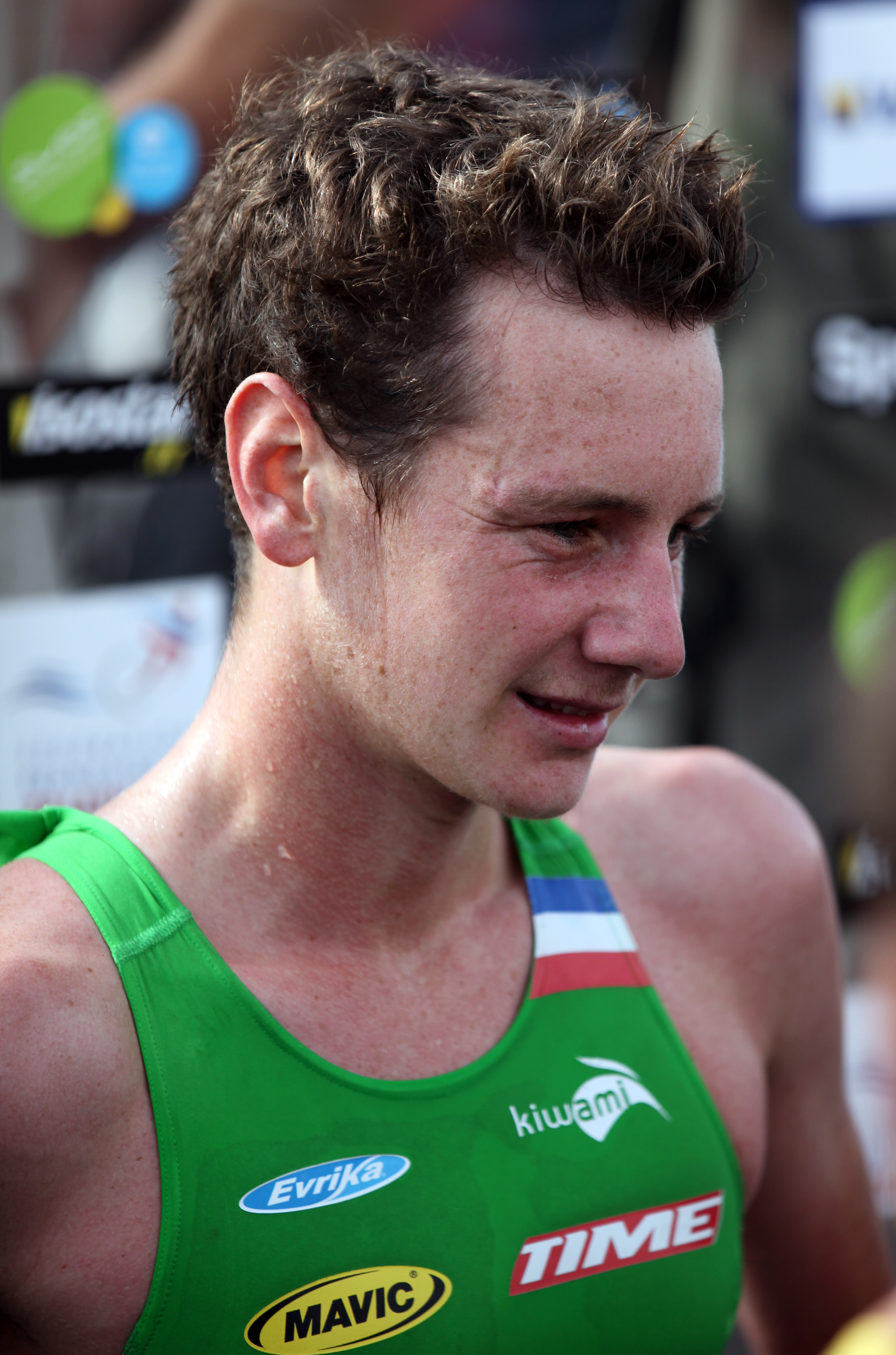
Alistair Brownlee won Madrid for the third year in a row.

The Madrid course was based in Casa de Campo park. Competitors started the race by jumping into the lake, where they swam two 750-metre laps. After transition, the athletes completed four 10 km laps of the park, which featured a 400-metre climb at a 12% grade. The run section featured four 2.5 km laps around the park to the finish.

In the men's race, the Brownlee brothers, Alistair and Johnathan, and Gómez exited the swim first and quickly formed, with eight others, an eleven-man breakaway group. At the end of the first bike lap, the breakaway had accumulated a 20-second lead. Olympic Champion Jan Frodeno bridged the gap and the now 12-man breakaway pushed on to the run section with a two-minute lead. On the run, the Brownlees separated themselves from the pack, along with Gómez. However, Gómez fell off the pace and the finish became a one-on-one duel between the brothers. In the final kilometre, Alistair kicked away from Jonathan before stopping in the finishing straight and walking across the line with his brother, with Johnathan making sure that Alistair crossed first. It was the first time that both brothers had appeared on the podium and it was Alistair's third straight win in Madrid. Gómez's third place kept him at the top of the overall standings, five points ahead of Jonathan. Polyansky, who finished fifth in Madrid, rounded out the top three in the overall standings. With his win, Alistair jumped up 20 places in the standings to fifth place in the overall standings.

In the women's competition, Laura Bennett and Andrea Hewitt joined Paula Findlay at the front coming out of the swim. However, once on the bike the three women were caught and a peloton of 16 formed. At the end of the bike, the lead peloton had a 30-second lead over the chasers. On the run Findlay raced away with Hewitt as the pair was pursued by Helen Jenkins and Díaz, creating a group of four. But after four kilometres, Díaz dropped off the pace on the final lap and Hewitt found the pace to be too tough and dropped back only to be passed for third by Emmie Charayron. Findlay and Jenkins were neck and neck until the final 400 metres when Findlay kicked away for her second consecutive 2011 World Series win. Findlay continued where she left off as she won, adding to her win in Sydney. With this race, Findlay had won four of her last five world series events, having won in Kitzbühel and London in 2010. After the race, the overall championship was led by Findlay with Díaz and Hewitt second and third. Bennett was fourth and Jenkins moved up to fifth.

=== Kitzbühel ===
Kitzbühel is one of the smallest venues of the series; despite this, the venue has been on the series since its inception. The triathlon began with two 750-metre laps around Schwarzsee Lake. The bike section had athletes ride a 6.68 km course which they lapped six times. The competitors' final leg was a four-lap 2.5 km run course. The 1997 World Champion Chris McCormack returned to ITU triathlons for the first time since 2004 with this race. Current World Champion Javier Gómez and Olympic Champion Jan Frodeno and Jonathan Brownlee missed this event to concentrate on the European Championships which took place the week after Kitzbühel.

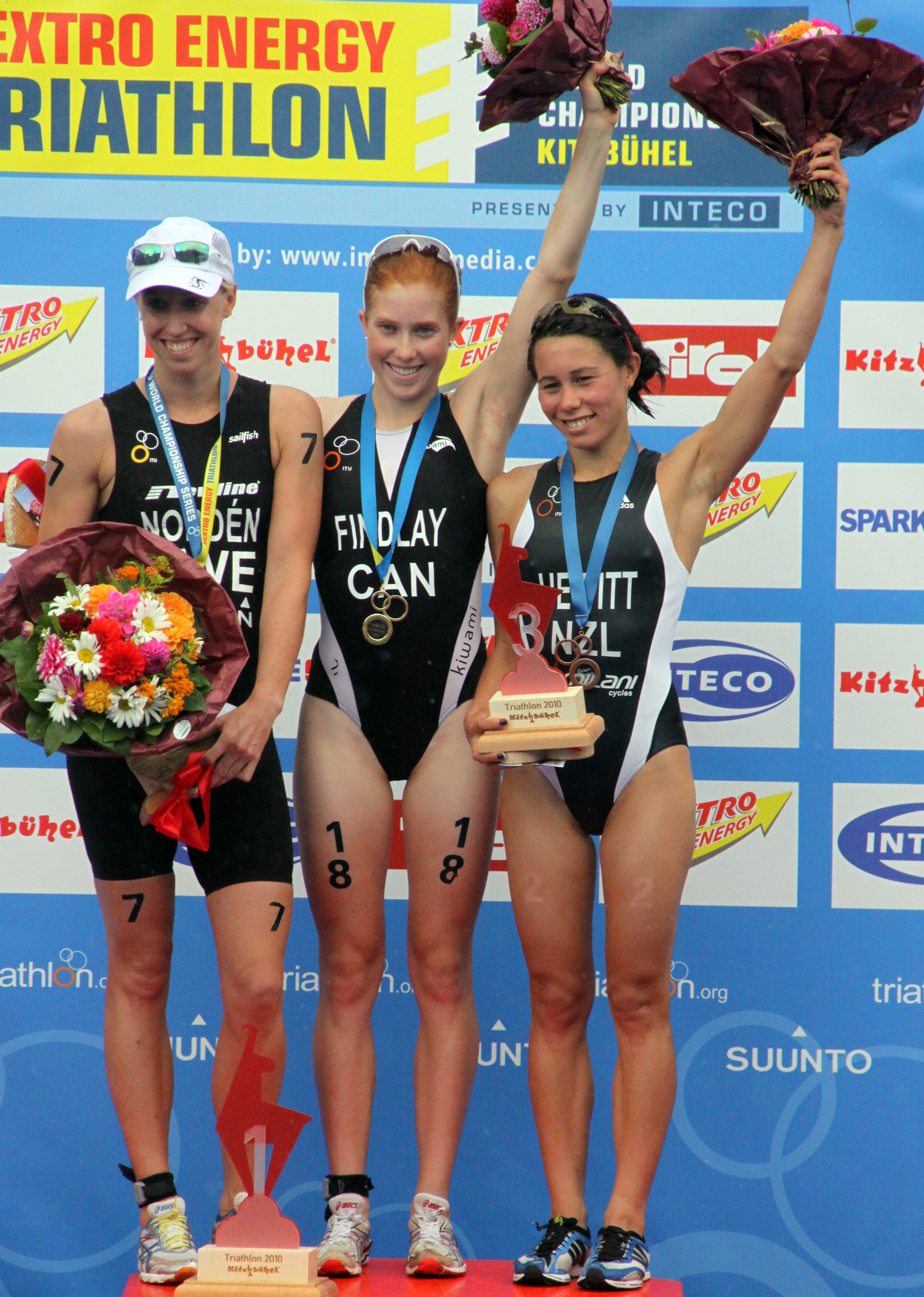
Paula Findlay (centre) won her third consecutive World Series event in 2011.

The men competed in cold, wet, windy conditions. Alistair Brownlee came out of the swim in the lead but was soon part of a 50-man peloton on the bike. However, Brownlee, Stuart Hayes and Reinaldo Colucci broke away to lead the field by 30 seconds entering the second transition. Once out of transition and on the run, Brownlee dropped Hayes and Colucci and went on to record his second Kitzbühel win, having won previously in 2009. Behind him, Alexander Brukhankov, Brad Kahlefeldt, Sven Riederer, William Clarke and Laurent Vidal formed a group that passed Hayes and Colucci. Halfway through the run, Brukhankov made a break for second place before Riederer broke on the final lap to secure third. Clarke won the battle for fourth as Kahelfeldt finished fifth and Vidal sixth. Meanwhile, McCormack's return to ITU racing triathlon was cut short as he pulled out of the race on the bike. Following the race, Alistair Brownlee led the overall championship standings over Brukhankov with Gómez and Jonathan Brownlee now third and fourth with Riederer moving up to fifth.

In the women's race, Sarah Haskins led the women's field coming out of the water with Helen Jenkins next, down 20 seconds, and Paula Findlay a minute behind. Haskins and Jenkins broke away on the bike but were unable to sustain a 40-second first lap lead before being caught on the fourth lap by a chase group of 19. On the run, the race came down to Findlay, Jenkins and Sarah Groff with Jenkins losing out to Findlay once again, finishing second. With the win, Findlay became the most successful woman in the series' three-year history with five wins. It was the Canadian's third consecutive win on the 2011 series. Elsewhere, Emma Moffatt, who fell behind the lead group on the bike, caught up to the field on the run to finish fourth. Ai Ueda had a strong run performance, passing most of the field en route to seventh-place finish. In the overall standings, Findlay had a perfect score and was approximately 500 points ahead of Díaz, Hewitt, Bennett and Jenkins who rounded out the top five.

=== Hamburg ===
Hamburg is the longest standing venue on the series, having hosted international events since 2002 including the 2007 World Championships. The course has athletes dive into an artificial lake for the swim, where they complete two 750-metre laps, but have to exit the water to complete a 180-degree turn after the first lap. The bike section is technically challenging with eight sharp corners near the bottom of the 5 km circuit which is lapped eight times. The run section has competitors complete four 2.5 km laps; however, there is a hazard as there are two 180-degree turns on each end of the course. Both Brownlee brothers missed the event, as did Paula Findlay and Helen Jenkins. Findlay missed the event with a hip injury which forced her to pull out of her home World Cup event in Edmonton.

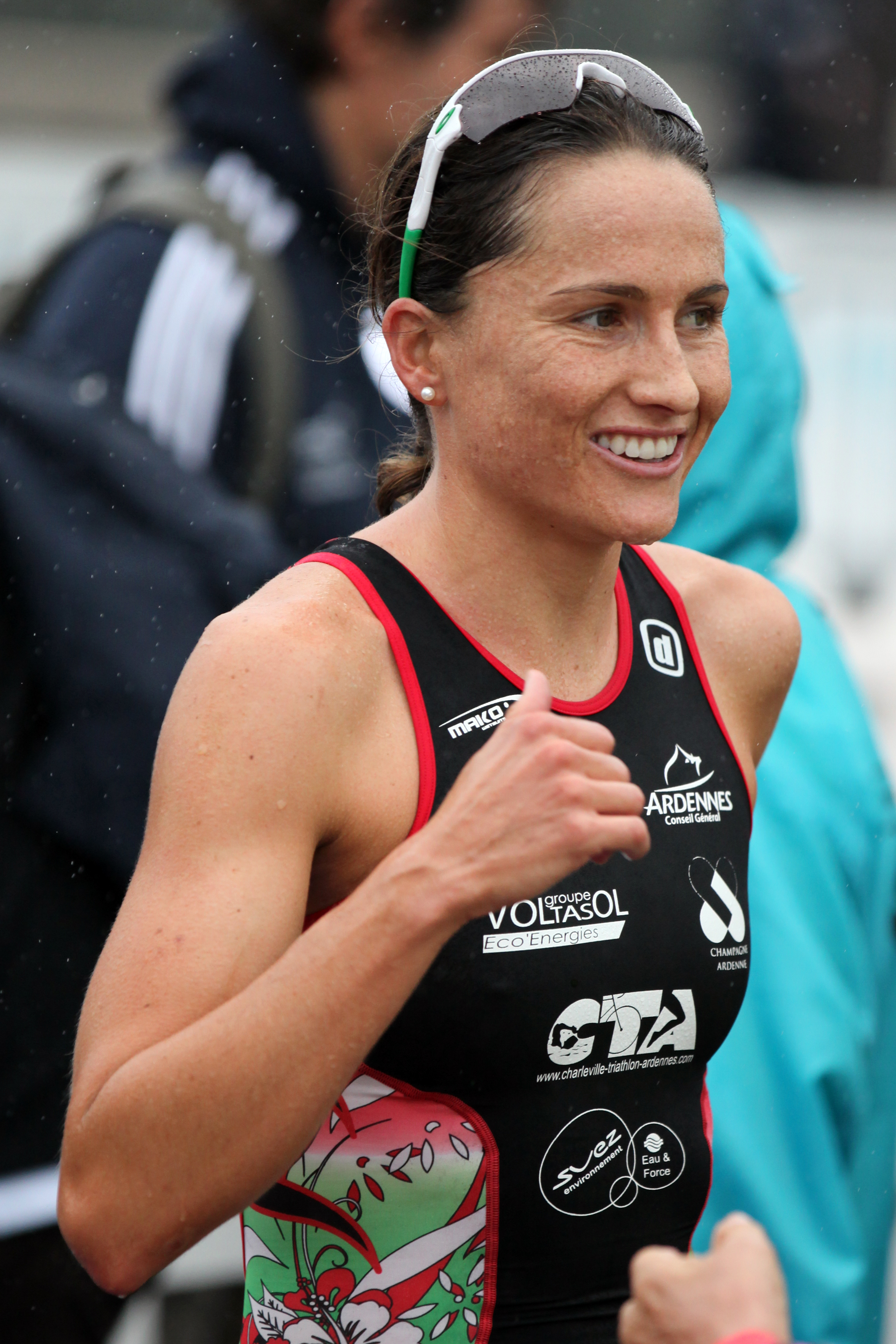
Emma Moffatt won her first world series event since 2009.

In the men's race, the bike portion had several groups attempt to break away without success as a peloton of around 50 riders hit the second transition. On the run, just before the 5 km point, a group of six at the front had been established. The six leaders included Brad Kahlefeldt, William Clarke, David Hauss, Javier Gómez, João Silva and Sebastian Rank. With 3 km to go, reigning Hamburg champion Gómez tried to kick away from the rest, only to see two kilometers later Hauss, Clarke and Kahlefeldt move away from him. In the last twenty metres, it looked like Clarke was going to win before Kahefeldt surged past him for his first ITU World Series win. The top four all ran splits under 30 minutes as Kahefeldt became the seventh man to win a round of the Dextro Energy Triathlon Series. At the halfway point in the championship series, Gómez now led the overall standings with 2026 points, with Clarke and Hauss second and third on 1935 and 1905 respectively. Sven Riederer and Alexander Brukhankov completed the top five.

In the women's race, history was made as Australia claimed all three podium spots for the first time, all who coincidentally had the first name Emma. Moffatt claimed her first win since the 2009 Grand Final, drawing her level with Paula Findley for total series wins at five. Moffatt defeated reigning world under-23 champion Jackson and 2008 Olympic Champion Snowsill into second and third. In the race itself, Lucy Hall of Great Britain led the swim with Nicola Spirig and Snowsill. Hall was caught on the first lap of the bike section as a peloton of 35 formed at the front. Moffatt led out of the final transition whilst Snowsill and Jackson started slower, but soon caught up. With five kilometres to go, the Australians were joined by New Zealand's Andrea Hewitt. In the final kilometre, Moffatt kicked away for the win whilst Jackson out-sprinted Snowsill for second. At the halfway point in the series with Findley missing, Díaz with a sixth-place finish was able to take the series lead, 97 points in front, with Hewitt and Moffatt third and fourth overall.

=== London ===
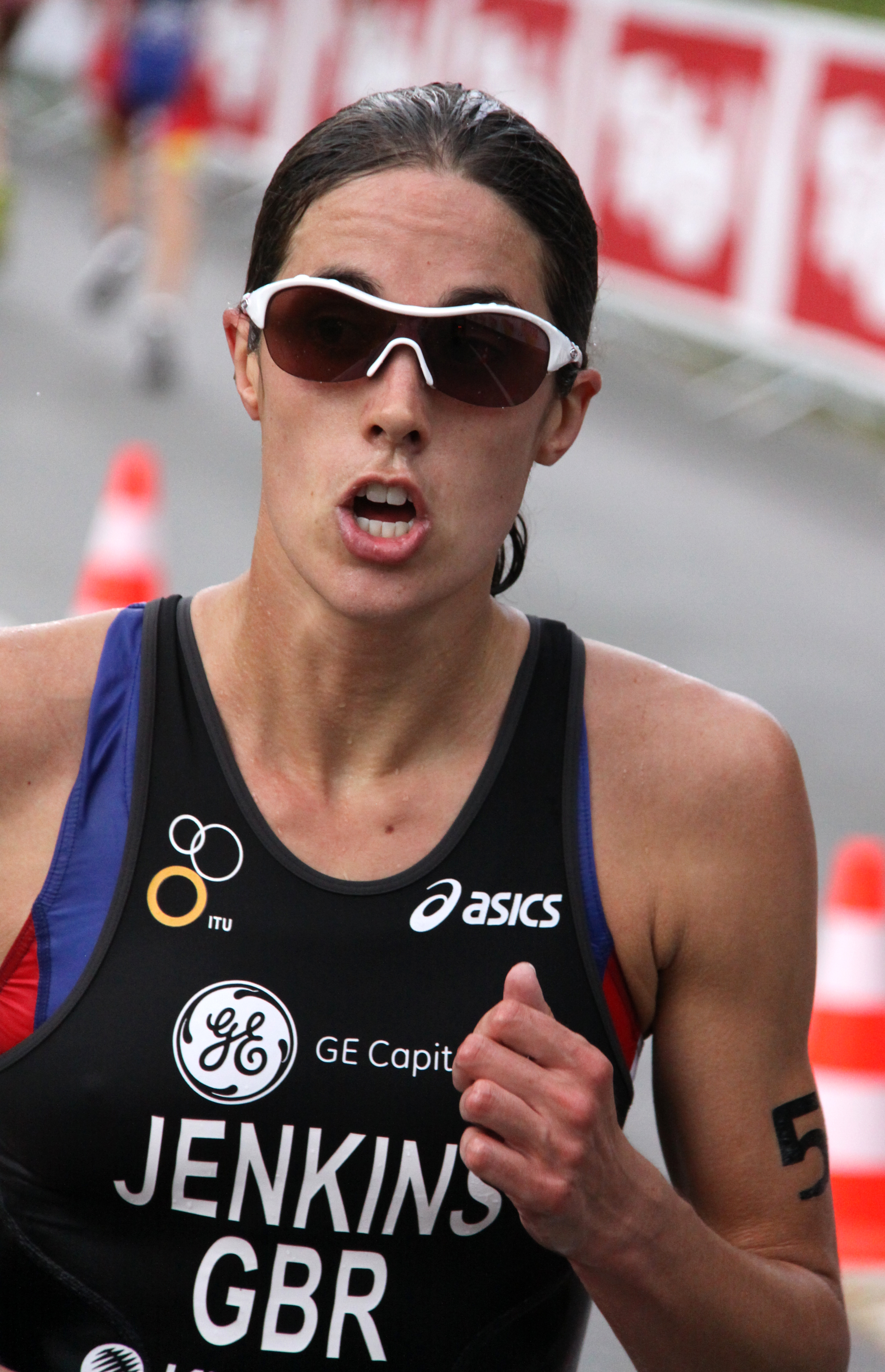
Helen Jenkins won her first World Series round in London.

London has been on the circuit since the beginning, and this was the last chance for athletes the run the Olympic course. The swim consisted of one 1.5 km lap in The Serpentine. The athletes then completed seven laps of the cycle circuit taking in Hyde Park Corner, before leaving Hyde Park itself and down Constitution Hill to Buckingham Palace, where the circuit looped itself and sent the athletes back the way they came from towards transition. The run section had the field complete four 2.5 km around the Serpentine. The course differs from that of previous editions, most notably one swim loop instead of two and for the first time the course ventured outside of Hyde Park on the bike section as the athletes passed through transition a total of 12 times.

London was a key round in terms of Olympic qualification to be held over the same course, as several national associations put the event in their qualification criteria. Paula Findlay arrived in London with an injury and had not raced in an ITU event since Kitzbühel. Javier Gómez thought he needed extra practice after his poor results since Madrid as he won an ITU Premium European Cup event before heading to London.

Alistair Brownlee, Alexander Bryukhankov, James Elvery and Ivan Rana managed to pull clear from the rest of the field on the bike. Brownlee in the run section moved away from the other three to finish 25 seconds ahead of Bryukhankov as his brother Jonathan Brownlee and Javier Gómez picked off Elvery and Rana before Brownlee moved away from the defending World Champion. The overall series still had Gómez leading from Alistair and Bryukhankov. Several athletes pulled out including Chris McCormack with a hamstring tare. Olympic qualification was also up for grabs as Justus, Hauss and Vidal took spots, whilst Frodeno just edged out Petzold to claim the second German spot.

In the women's race, Helen Jenkins powered away from the rest of the field on the run to win. With the win, Jenkins won her first World Championship series event since the format began in 2009 and booked her place on Britain's Olympic team. Despite suffering a cold, Jenkins finished ahead of first-time medalists Gwen Jorgensen and Anja Dittmer. A group of 34 formed on the bike with Diaz and Sweetland eventually bridging the gap leaving a group of 50 triathletes to go into the run section together. Jenkins surged ahead in the run to win as Jorgensen set the fastest run split to qualify for the US and claim the silver medal. Dittmer came home for bronze after out-sprinting a group containing Snowsill, Groff and Hewitt. Hewitt and Groff qualified for London whilst the Australians failed to meet their nation's criteria. Series leader Paula Findlay finished 19th as Diaz and Hewitt leapfrogged her in the overall championship, with London winner Jenkins in fourth.

=== Lausanne ===
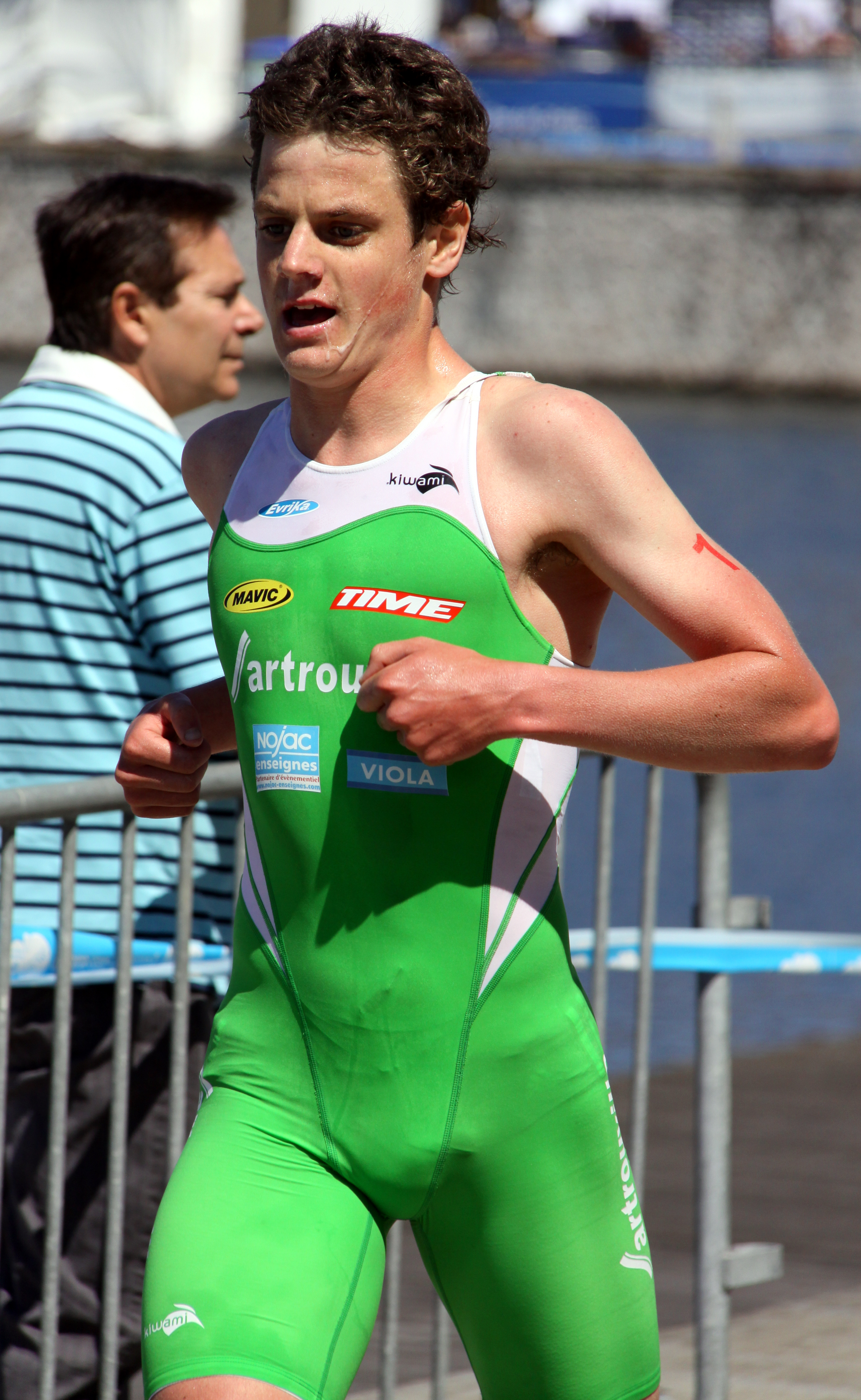
Jonathan Brownlee successfully defended his World Sprint crown.

Barbara Riveros Diaz claimed her first ITU World title when she came from fourth at the 500 metres to go point to out-sprint Hewitt, Jackson and Jenkins to the World Sprint title. In the men's race, a familiar trio took the first three spots and Jonathan Brownlee successfully defended his title out-kicking Gómez in the final few metres after earlier dropping his brother.

In the overall series rankings, Diaz had led the women's field into Lausanne but it was Helen Jenkins who led the series into the Grand Final. The top four results in the series count towards a person's overall ranking. Jenkins with her fourth-place finish replaced her 33rd position from Sydney which had previously counted to lead Diaz by 2913 points to 2712. In the battle for third, Paula Findley leads on 2637, but has been hampered with a hip injury. One point behind the Canadian is Andrea Hewitt. While Emma Jackson in her debut season on the ITU elite circuit can not be discounted on 2251 points.

In the men's series, the medals were expected to be taken from a combination of Alistair Brownlee, Jonny Brownlee and Javier Gómez. Alistair leapt to the top of the standings after Lausanne, allowing his only non podium finish of the year, 29th in Sydney, to drop off, and now leading his brother and Gómez into the final round. The top three points look like this going into the final round: Alistair is on 3085 points, Jonathan with 2965 points, and Gómez with 2858 points. Fourth place man Alexander Brukhankov remained a threat to the podium with 2699 points. David Hauss was also still a candidate for the podium, sitting in fifth place going into Beijing on 2405 points. In Beijing, 1200 points were on offer to the winner, with 1100 to second and 1027 to third, where the 2011 World Champions will be crowned.

=== Beijing ===
Beijing hosted the Dextro Energy Triathlon ITU World Championship Series 2011 Grand Final where double points were available. This was the first time since the 2008 Olympics that the world series has come to Beijing. The competitors started the grand final by jumping into the Chang Ping reservoir for one 1.5 km lap. After the swim the bike section covered a 6.6 km course which was partly hilly and technically challenging. It was lapped six times. The run section was held over four 2.5 km laps on a hilly course

Over the 2008 Olympic course, Alistair would be crowned World Champion for a second time if he won the race, or if Jonathan won he needed to finish second. For Gómez, he would defend his title if he won the race and the Brownlee brothers finished outside of the top three. Since 2009 when this format was adopted Alistair had won 50% of the races and had never lost a Grand Final. However, Alexander Bryukhankov was not discounted and needed a big upset to win a place on the podium. Male athletes from America and New Zealand were expected to be featured in the race as neither nation had any athletes who met the qualifying standards for the Olympics in London, and they had another opportunity here to qualify.

For the women, Helen Jenkins would win her second World title if she finished on the podium in Beijing, a feat which she admitted was not a target in 2011. Findlay and Hewitt who were third and fourth in the standings coming into the event with just one point separating them, with the winner of the battle in Beijing finishing ahead of her rival. However Findlay could receive the silver medal and Hewitt the bronze if they both finished ahead of Riveros Diaz and Hewitt could get the silver medal if she beat the pair of them.

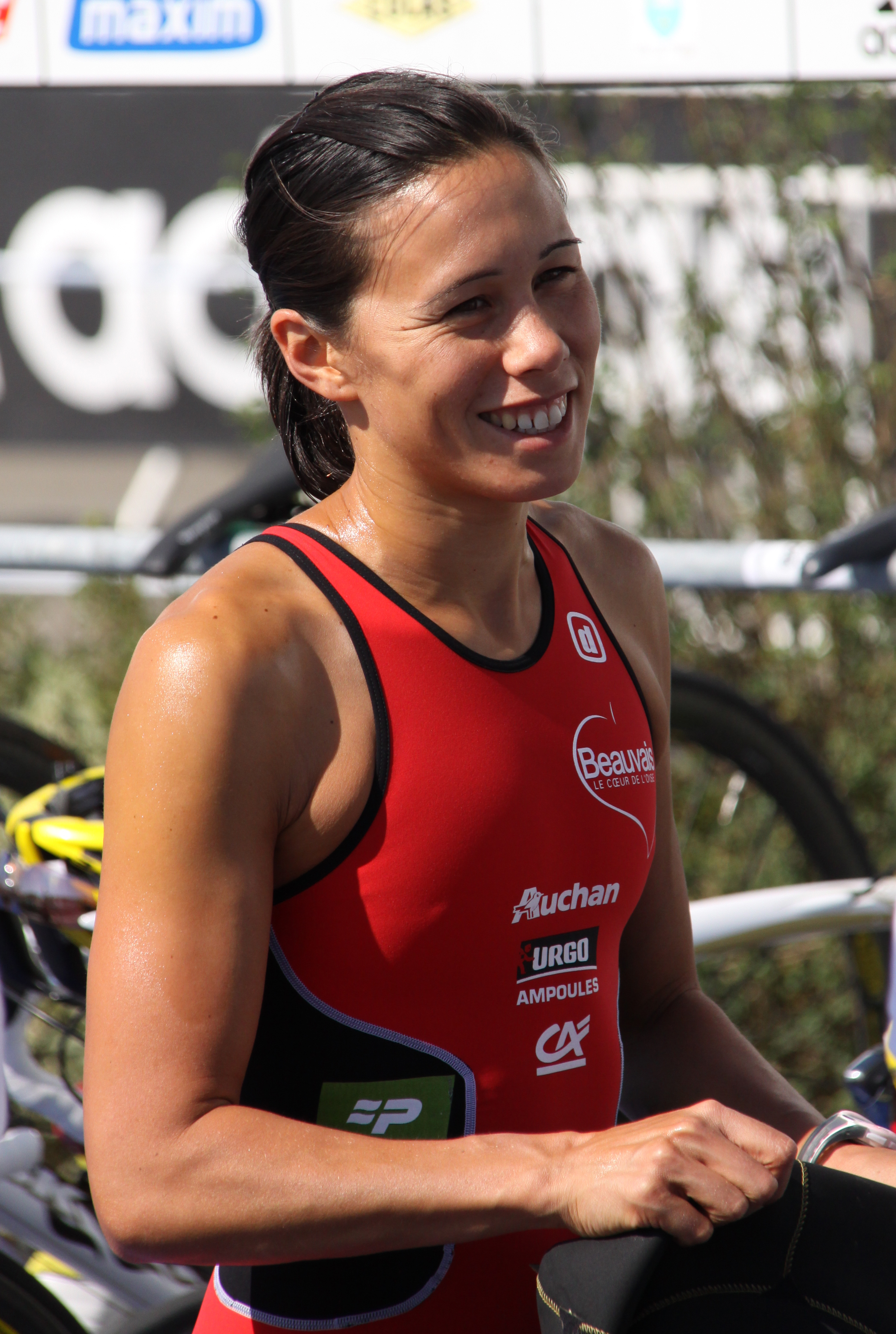
Andrea Hewitt won the Grand Final, her first World Championship series win since Madrid in 2009.

Alistair Brownlee kept his perfect Grand Final record as he claimed his second ITU World Championship and 11th World Series race win. Thirty athletes headed out of the swim together and despite numerous attempts to breakaway on the bike headed in to the run section together. A chase pack led by McCormack cut the gap to 30 seconds which then grew to 45 seconds on the final bike lap. The Brownlees went into a lead by themselves on the run but the chase was never more than 10 seconds away which included Gómez, Riederer, Alexander Brukhankov, Dmitry Polyansky, David Hauss and Laurent Vidal. On lap three Alistair dropped his brother, and Riederer and Gómez came up to him. There Gómez dropped off the pace and finished sixth while Riederer out-kicked Jonathan for second. Gómez's sixth place was enough for him to take bronze overall as the overall podium did not change.

Helen Jenkins was crowned the 2011 ITU World Champion when she did what was required of her and finished second on the podium to claim her second individual elite world title. Andrea Hewitt won the Grand Final race to win her first World Championship series event since Madrid 2009 and finished in exactly the same time as when Snowsill won Olympic Gold in 2008. With the New Zealander winning, Paula Findlay pulling out on the bike leg, and Riveros Diaz being hampered by illness, Hewitt claimed silver overall. Sarah Groff finished in 10th place on the day, claimed to claim the overall bronze title ahead of Emma Jackson, but has to thank Emma Moffatt, who over took her teammate in the last few metres. Jackson finished 12th and therefore finished just 23 points behind the American. Diaz and Findlay finished fifth and sixth in the final standings.

In the race itself, a group of 15 triathletes broke away on the swim which included Jenkins, Groff and Hewitt. Only Vicky Holland and Kate Roberts fell off the group on the bike. Moffatt, Jackson, Riveros Diaz, Snowsill and Spirig in the chase group saw their deficit go from 30 seconds to 2 minutes by the second transition even with Sprig up front. Jenkins and Hewitt pulled away from the rest on the run, before the New Zealander kicked away in the last few metres to win. Melanie Annaheim managed to out-sprint Norden, Bennett and McIlroy for her first World Series medal. On the Olympic front, Harrison and McIlroy managed to qualify for France and New Zealand.

==== Under-23 World Championships ====
The under-23 races are held over the same course as the elite races. Great Britain head the men's field with the Silver medalist from the Tiszaujavorous World Cup race Aaron Harris and the 2010 Junior world silver medalist Tom Bishop and Matthew Sharp, with defending champion Jonathon Brownlee racing in the elite race. Also in the race were 2010 Aquathlon World Champion Richard Varga, Andrey Bryukhankov, whose brother was fourth coming into the event in the elite standings, amongst others who were likely to feature. In the women's race the triathletes likely to feature were Zsofia Kovacs who finished seventh at the European Championship and in her home World Cup event. Rebecca Robisch who finished 15th in the Sprint distance World Championships and All Africa Games bronze medalist Fabienne Aline St.Louis were also favourites. Maike Caelers who finished 12th in 2010 could not be ruled out.

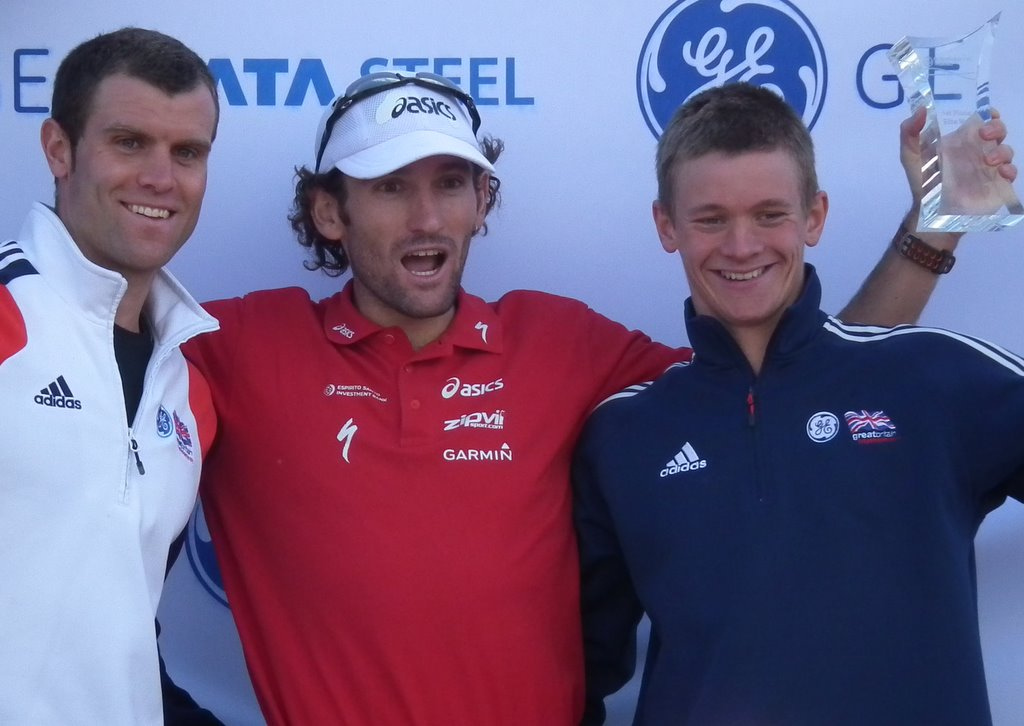
Matthew Sharp (right) claimed his first World title.

History was created in the men's race as Great Britain became the first nation to make a clean sweep of the medals in the under-23 category. Matthew Sharp led David McNamee and Tom Bishop home. Igor Polyanskiy and Denis Vasiliev were first out of the water for Russia but Polyanskiy had to serve a 15-second penalty for a false start. A lead group of 32 triathletes formed on the bike section until Tom Davison, Benjamin Shaw and Michael Poole broke clear. The trio had a 70-second lead going into the run section but all three were soon caught by the second lap. A group of five then formed at the front of Greg Billington, Pierre Le Corre and the British trio. Le Corre found the pace too hot and dropped off, on the bell lap, Sharp broke free of the rest to win his first World title, whilst Billington dropped off to finish fourth leaving McNamee to outsprint Bishop for silver.

Two groups formed on the bike out of the swim. Wang Yingying pleased the home fans coming out of the swim first. Yuko Takahashi (JPN), Alexandra Coates (CAN), Robisch and Kaitlin Shiver were in the first group of 15, but before the 10 km point the chase pack had eliminated a 25-second gap to form a group of 25. In the run, a group of 10 quickly formed including Yuliya Yelistratova and Jerzyk, Kovacs, Kyla and Alexandra Coates (CAN) and Lauren Goss. On the third lap the group began to splinter, as Kovacs led with Yelistratova, Jerzyk and Shiver chasing. Yelistratova fell off the pace on the final lap as Jerzyk outsprinted Kovacs in the final 200 metres. While Robish ran through Shiver to claim bronze. Jerzyk's win was Poland's first ever World Championship medal.

==== Junior World Championships ====
The junior world championships were held over a sprint distance triathlon. The race featured a 750-metre swim, 20 km ride and 5 km run and was open to triathletes who were 19 or younger. 2010 champion Ashleigh Gentle did not defend her title as she was not racing in the event. 2010 Youth Olympic Games medalists were expected to be prominent in the race. Kelly Whitley of America, who finished fourth in 2010 and claimed a bronze in Singapore, was one of the favourites As was Olympic champion and European silver medalist Eszter Dudas along with European Champion Hanna Philippin and bronze medalist Eszter Pap. While Fanny Beisaron and Lucy Hall who both gained world series experience in 2011 could not be discounted. In the boys race Olympic medalists were again amongst the favourites. Champion, Aaron Barclay, and bronze medallist, Alois Knabl, headed the field. Also favourites in the field were Ron Darmon who finished fifth in 2010, All Africa Games bronze medalist Wian Sullwald and European champion Justus Nieschlag.

In the women's race, Mikayla Nielsen won the junior world title. Lucy Hall led out of the 750-metre swim section. Hall was quickly joined on the bike by Anastasia Gorbunova, Sophie Drews and Monika Orazem. Hall and Orazem broke away and were caught by the 15 chasers at the end of the second lap on the bike. Out of transition Nielsen made her move with Ashlee Bailie and Hanna Philippin following. Nielsen though held the pair of for her first world title as Bailie came second and Philippin third.

The men's race saw Lukas Verzbicas fulfill his promise to Kevin McDowell and win his first world title. Verzbicas had decided to return to triathlon for one more season to win the world title for McDowell. McDowell was diagnosed with Hodgkin lymphoma in March and Verzbicas was sure that he would have won the world title in 2011. The American defeated European Champion Justus Nieschlag and another American, Tony Smoragiewicz in to second and third. Olympic Champion Aaron Barclay and bronze medallist Alois Knabl were first out of the swim in a group of eight as two groups formed on the bike. Verzbicas and the rest of the chase pack caught the leaders on the first climb of the bike. On the run, Verzbicaks pulled away to seal an emotional world title.

==== Paratriathlon World Championships ====
Great Britain dominated in the paratriathlon, taking the top two spots in four of the 12 categories. Jane Egan and Elizabeth McTernan in TRI 1, Faye McClelland (GBR) and Clare Cunningham in TRI 4, Charlotte Ellis and Sara Butler in TRI 6 and Steven Judge and James Smith claiming top two positions for Great Britain in TRI 3. America took the top three spots in the TRI 2 event while Canada collected Gold and Bronze, separated by the US in TRI 3. America also took Gold in Tri 5 thanks to Danielle McLaughlin. France claimed the TRI 4 and TRI 5 titles on the men's side. Bill Chaffey and Oswald Kydd won TRI 1 and 2, while Rodrigo Feola won TRI 6.

== Results ==
=== Medal summary ===
==== Men ====
Event	Gold	Silver	Bronze
Sydney	Javier Gomez (ESP)	Jonathan Brownlee (GBR)	Sven Riederer (SUI)
Madrid	Alistair Brownlee (GBR)	Jonathan Brownlee (GBR)	Javier Gomez (ESP)
Kitzbühel	Alistair Brownlee (GBR)	Alex Brukhankov (RUS)	Sven Riederer (SUI)
Hamburg	Brad Kahlefeldt (AUS)	William Clarke (GBR)	David Hauss (FRA)
London	Alistair Brownlee (GBR)	Alex Brukhankov (RUS)	Jonathan Brownlee (GBR)
Lausanne	Jonathan Brownlee (GBR)	Javier Gomez (ESP)	Alistair Brownlee (GBR)
Beijing	Alistair Brownlee (GBR)	Sven Riederer (SUI)	Jonathan Brownlee (GBR)
Overall	Alistair Brownlee (GBR)	Jonathan Brownlee (GBR)	Javier Gomez (ESP)

==== Women ====
Event	Gold	Silver	Bronze
Sydney	Paula Findlay (CAN)	Barbara Riveros Diaz (CHI)	Andrea Hewitt (NZL)
Madrid	Paula Findlay (CAN)	Helen Jenkins (GBR)	Emmie Charayron (FRA)
Kitzbühel	Paula Findlay (CAN)	Helen Jenkins (GBR)	Sarah Groff (USA)
Hamburg	Emma Moffatt (AUS)	Emma Jackson (AUS)	Emma Snowsill (AUS)
London	Helen Jenkins (GBR)	Gwen Jorgensen (USA)	Anja Dittmer (GER)
Lausanne	Barbara Riveros Diaz (CHI)	Emma Jackson (AUS)	Andrea Hewitt (NZL)
Beijing	Andrea Hewitt (NZL)	Helen Jenkins (GBR)	Melanie Annaheim (SUI)
Overall	Helen Jenkins (GBR)	Andrea Hewitt (NZL)	Sarah Groff (USA)

=== Top 10 ===
==== Men ====
===== Sydney =====
Rank	Athlete	Time
Gold medal	Javier Gomez (ESP)	1:50:22
Silver medal	Jonathan Brownlee (GBR)	1:50:29
Bronze medal	Sven Riederer (SUI)	1:50:34
4	Brendan Sexton (AUS)	1:50:40
5	David Hauss (FRA)	1:50:49
6	Tim Don (GBR)	1:50:58
7	Jonathan Zipf (GER)	1:51:04
8	Joao Silva (POR)	1:51:17
9	Will Clarke (GBR)	1:51:19
10	Dmitry Polyanski (RUS)	1:51:26

===== Madrid =====
Rank	Athlete	Time
Gold medal	Alistair Brownlee (GBR)	1:51:06
Silver medal	Jonathan Brownlee (GBR)	1:51:09
Bronze medal	Javier Gomez (ESP)	1:51:51
4	Alexander Brukhankov (RUS)	1:52:02
5	Dmitry Polyanski (RUS)	1:52:30
6	Jan Frodeno (GER)	1:52:43
7	Frédéric Belaubre (FRA)	1:52:45
8	Aurélien Raphael (FRA)	1:52:49
9	Maik Petzold (GER)	1:53:01
10	Steffen Justus (GER)	1:53:04

===== Kitzbühel =====
Rank	Athlete	Time
Gold medal	Alistair Brownlee (GBR)	1:51:54
Silver medal	Alexander Brukhankov (RUS)	1:52:38
Bronze medal	Sven Riederer (SUI)	1:52:59
4	William Clarke (GBR)	1:53:08
5	Brad Kahlefeldt (AUS)	1:53:10
6	Laurent Vidal (FRA)	1:53:13
7	Vladimir Turbaevskiy (RUS)	1:53:17
8	Dmitry Polyanski (RUS)	1:53:20
9	Vincent Luis (FRA)	1:53:23
10	Bevan Docherty (NZL)	1:53:26

===== Hamburg =====
Rank	Athlete	Time
Gold medal	Brad Kahlefeldt (AUS)	1:44:08
Silver medal	William Clarke (GBR)	1:44:09
Bronze medal	David Hauss (FRA)	1:44:09
4	Sebastian Rank (GER)	1:44:12
5	Joao Silva (POR)	1:44:16
6	Javier Gomez (ESP)	1:44:19
7	Tim Don (GBR)	1:44:33
8	Reto Hug (SUI)	1:44:35
9	Jonathan Zipf (GER)	1:44:44
10	Sven Riederer (SUI)	1:44:56

===== London =====
Rank	Athlete	Time
Gold medal	Alistair Brownlee (GBR)	1:50:09
Silver medal	Alexander Brukhankov (RUS)	1:50:34
Bronze medal	Jonathan Brownlee (GBR)	1:51:04
4	Javier Gomez (ESP)	1:51:16
5	Steffen Justus (GER)	1:51:25
6	Laurent Vidal (FRA)	1:51:27
7	David Hauss (FRA)	1:51:32
8	Brad Kahlefeldt (AUS)	1:51:40
9	Sven Riederer (SUI)	1:51:41
10	Vincent Luis (FRA)	1:51:41

===== Lausanne =====
Rank	Athlete	Time
Gold medal	Jonathan Brownlee (GBR)	0:52:23
Silver medal	Javier Gomez (ESP)	0:52:27
Bronze medal	Alistair Brownlee (GBR)	0:52:38
4	David Hauss (FRA)	0:52:41
5	Alexander Brukhankov (RUS)	0:52:42
6	Laurent Vidal (FRA)	0:52:43
7	Jonathan Zipf (GER)	0:52:44
8	Joao Silva (POR)	0:52:52
9	Christian Prochnow (GER)	0:52:55
10	Tony Moulai (FRA)	0:53:02

===== Grand Final: Beijing =====
Rank	Athlete	Time
Gold medal	Alistair Brownlee (GBR)	01:48:07
Silver medal	Sven Riederer (SUI)	01:48:14
Bronze medal	Jonathan Brownlee (GBR)	01:48:17
4	Dmitry Polyanski (RUS)	01:48:20
5	Laurent Vidal (FRA)	01:48:24
6	Javier Gomez (ESP)	01:48:27
7	David Hauss (FRA)	01:48:35
8	Vincent Luis (FRA)	01:48:44
9	Maik Petzold (GER)	01:48:46
10	Ivan Rana (ESP)	01:48:50

===== Overall =====
Rank	Athlete	Points
Gold medal	Alistair Brownlee (GBR)	4285
Silver medal	Jonathan Brownlee (GBR)	3992
Bronze medal	Javier Gomez (ESP)	3671
4	Sven Riederer (SUI)	3306
5	Alexander Brukhankov (RUS)	3208
6	David Hauss (FRA)	3157
7	Laurent Vidal (FRA)	2844
8	Dmitry Polyanski (RUS)	2764
9	William Clarke (GBR)	2495
10	Brad Kahlefeldt (AUS)	2217

==== Women ====
===== Sydney =====
Rank	Athlete	Time
Gold medal	Paula Findlay (CAN)	2:01:21
Silver medal	Bárbara Riveros Díaz (CHI)	2:01:24
Bronze medal	Andrea Hewitt (NZL)	2:01:29
4	Carole Péon (FRA)	2:01:39
5	Tomoko Sakimoto (JPN)	2:01:40
6	Laura Bennett (USA)	2:01:59
7	Ai Ueda (JPN)	2:02:02
8	Liz Blatchford (GBR)	2:02:32
9	Lisa Nordén (SWE)	2:02:36
10	Lauren Campbell (CAN)	2:02:43

===== Madrid =====
Rank	Athlete	Time
Gold medal	Paula Findlay (CAN)	2:03:46
Silver medal	Helen Jenkins (GBR)	2:03:49
Bronze medal	Emmie Charayron (FRA)	2:03:58
4	Andrea Hewitt (NZL)	2:04:00
5	Bárbara Riveros Díaz (CHI)	2:04:43
6	Kate McIlroy (NZL)	2:04:57
7	Sarah Groff (USA)	2:05:28
8	Laura Bennett (USA)	2:05:33
9	Svenja Bazlen (GER)	2:05:35
10	Rachel Klamer (NED)	2:05:58

===== Kitzbühel =====
Rank	Athlete	Time
Gold medal	Paula Findlay (CAN)	2:05:52
Silver medal	Helen Jenkins (GBR)	2:05:56
Bronze medal	Sarah Groff (USA)	2:06:27
4	Emma Moffatt (AUS)	2:06:31
5	Bárbara Riveros Díaz (CHI)	2:06:41
6	Laura Bennett (USA)	2:06:44
7	Ai Ueda (JPN)	2:07:00
8	Erin Densham (AUS)	2:07:03
9	Svenja Bazlen (GER)	2:07:10
10	Nicky Samuels (NZL)	2:07:11

===== Hamburg =====
Rank	Athlete	Time
Gold medal	Emma Moffatt (AUS)	1:53:37
Silver medal	Emma Jackson (AUS)	1:53:44
Bronze medal	Emma Snowsill (AUS)	1:53:44
4	Andrea Hewitt (NZL)	1:53:59
5	Bárbara Riveros Díaz (CHI)	1:54:32
6	Ainhoa Murua (ESP)	1:54:33
7	Erin Densham (AUS)	1:54:43
8	Danne Boterenbrood (NED)	1:54:49
9	Jodie Stimpson (GBR)	1:54:50
10	Svenja Bazlen (GER)	1:54:52

===== London =====
Rank	Athlete	Time
Gold medal	Helen Jenkins (GBR)	2:00:34
Silver medal	Gwen Jorgensen (USA)	2:00:41
Bronze medal	Anja Dittmer (GER)	2:00:49
4	Emma Jackson (AUS)	2:00:51
5	Emma Snowsill (AUS)	2:00:52
6	Andrea Hewitt (NZL)	2:00:54
7	Sarah Groff (USA)	2:00:58
8	Nicola Spirig (SUI)	2:01:04
9	Ashleigh Gentle (AUS)	2:01:07
10	Emmie Charayron (FRA)	2:01:10

===== Lausanne =====
Rank	Athlete	Time
Gold medal	Bárbara Riveros Díaz (CHI)	0:58:35
Silver medal	Emma Jackson (AUS)	0:58:35
Bronze medal	Andrea Hewitt (NZL)	0:58:37
4	Helen Jenkins (GBR)	0:58:40
5	Ashleigh Gentle (AUS)	0:58:42
6	Gwen Jorgensen (USA)	0:59:02
7	Sarah Groff (USA)	0:59:06
8	Lisa Nordén (SWE)	0:59:07
9	Emmie Charayron (FRA)	0:59:09
10	Felicity Abram (AUS)	0:59:09

===== Grand Final: Beijing =====
Rank	Athlete	Time
Gold medal	Andrea Hewitt (NZL)	1:58:26
Silver medal	Helen Jenkins (GBR)	1:58:40
Bronze medal	Melanie Annaheim (SUI)	1:58:58
4	Lisa Nordén (SWE)	1:59:00
5	Laura Bennett (USA)	1:59:02
6	Kate McIlroy (NZL)	1:59:04
7	Jessica Harrison (FRA)	1:59:09
8	Liz Blatchford (GBR)	2:00:11
9	Flora Duffy (BER)	2:00:24
10	Sarah Groff (USA)	2:00:37

===== Overall =====
Rank	Athlete	Points
Gold medal	Helen Jenkins (GBR)	4023
Silver medal	Andrea Hewitt (NZL)	3836
Bronze medal	Sarah Groff (USA)	2783
4	Emma Jackson (AUS)	2760
5	Bárbara Riveros Díaz (CHI)	2754
6	Paula Findlay (CAN)	2637
7	Emma Moffatt (AUS)	2611
8	Laura Bennett (USA)	2560
9	Lisa Nordén (SWE)	2265
10	Melanie Annaheim (SUI)	1950
