= Paula Findlay =

Canadian triathlete (born 1989)

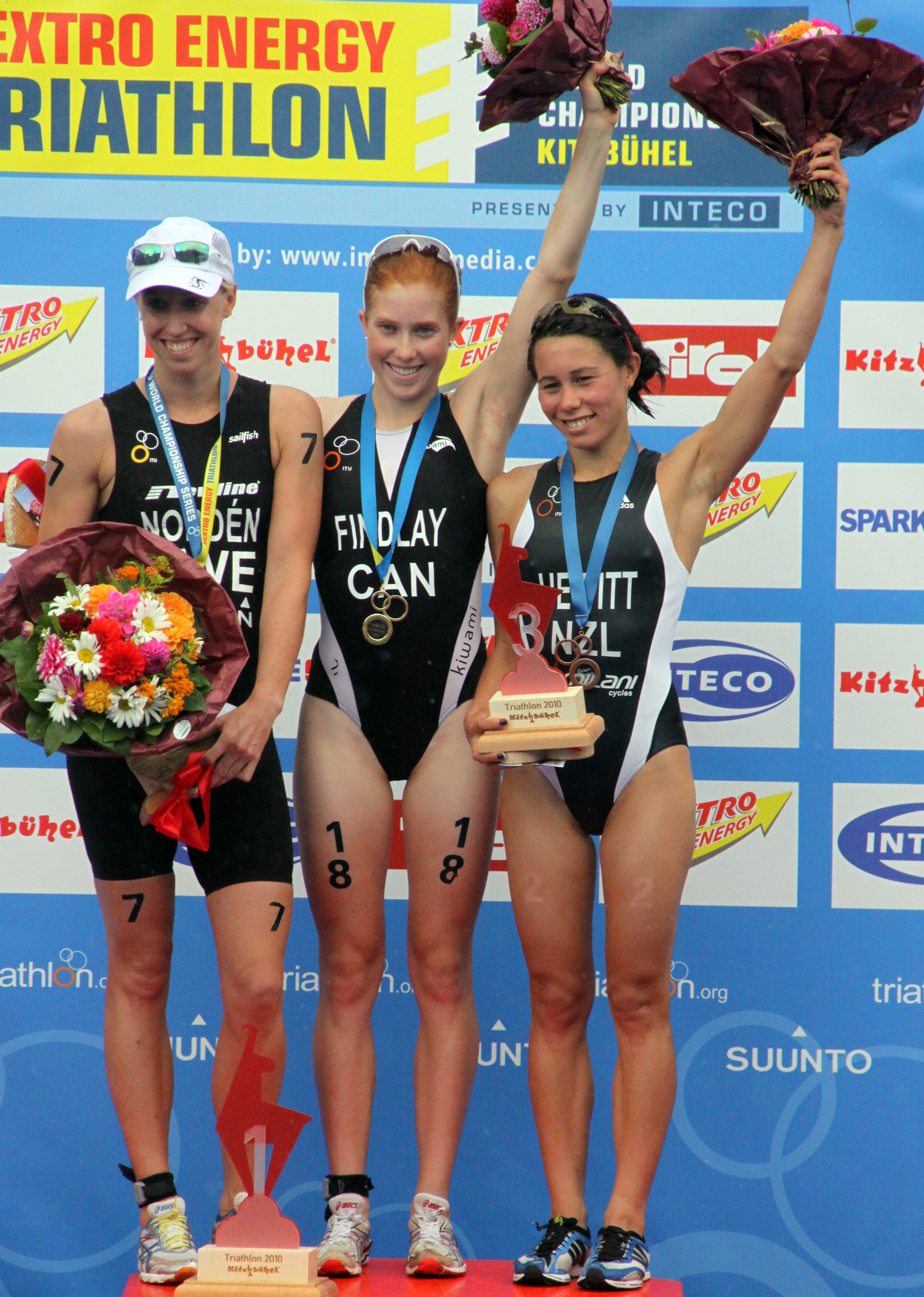
- Findlay (centre) with the gold medal at the World Championship Series triathlon in Kitzbuhel, 2010

Personal information
- Born: May 26, 1989 (age 37) Edmonton, Alberta, Canada
- Height: 1.70 m (5 ft 7 in)
- Weight: 60 kg (130 lb)

Sport
- Country: Canada
- Sport: Triathlon
- Coached by: Paulo Sousa
Medal record
Triathlon
Representing Canada
ITU Triathlon World Championships
| Bronze medal – third place | 2009 Gold Coast | Under 23 |
| Gold medal – first place | 2010 London | Elite |
| Gold medal – first place | 2010 Kitzbuehel | Elite |
| Gold medal – first place | 2011 Sydney | Elite |
| Gold medal – first place | 2011 Madrid | Elite |
| Gold medal – first place | 2011 Kitzbuehel | Elite |
PATCO Triathlon Pan American Championships
| Gold medal – first place | 2007 Edmonton | Junior |
Ironman 70.3 World Championship
| Silver medal – second place | 2022 | Individual |

Paula Findlay (born May 26, 1989) is a Canadian triathlete from Edmonton, Alberta.

== Early career ==
On September 9, 2009, Findlay competed at the Dextro Energy Triathlon - ITU World Championship Grand Final in Gold Coast, Australia. She placed third in the under 23 women race.

In April 2010, Findlay won the 2010 Monterrey ITU Triathlon World Cup Elite Women's race. She also had a victory at the June 26th Coteau-du-Lac ITU Triathlon Pan American Cup. On July 24, Findlay won the ITU World Championship Series event held in London. She then won the ITU Triathlon World Championships Series event in Kitzbühel on August 14, making Findlay the only female triathlete to win consecutive ITU World Championship Series events in 2010. Another victory for Findlay was achieved on August 20, 2010 at the Kelowna ITU Triathlon Premium Pan American Cup.

Paula Findlay won the first three ITU World Championship Series events of the 2011 season in Sydney, Madrid, and Kitzbühel. At that time, she was ranked 1st in the world by the International Triathlon Union.

Due to a hip injury, Findlay had not competed since the IT World Championship Grand Final in Beijing, China on September 9, 2011.

=== 2012 London Olympics ===
Because of her rising success, Triathlon Canada used discretionary selections to nominate Findlay to the 2012 Summer Olympics. However, in the year leading up to the Olympic Games Findlay struggled with a hip injury. According to Canadian triathlete Simon Whitfield, Findlay's recovery leading up to the games was mismanaged. That mismanagement, along with iron-deficiency anemia, caused her to finish in 52nd place, the final athlete to complete the race.

== Recent success ==
Findlay re-emerged in triathlon in 2018 when she won the 2018 Ironman 70.3 North American Championships.

The next year, she won the 2019 70.3 Ironman at Indian Wells and the 2019 Challenge Daytona (1 mile/37.5 miles/8.2 miles).

In 2020 she won Challenge Daytona (2 km/80 km/18 km), for which she was awarded a $100,000 USD prize, the most lucrative victory of her career.

In 2021, Findlay won Ironman 70.3 Oceanside but spent much of the rest of the year injured.

In 2022, Findlay came in second at both Ironman 70.3 Chattanooga and the 2022 Ironman 70.3 World Championships. But she surprised the cycling world with a win 2022 Canadian Road Championships in the time trial. Findlay ended the season with a win at Ironman 70.3 Indian Wells.

To start the 2023 season Findlay took first place at both St Anthony's Triathlon in St Petersburg, Florida and Ironman 70.3 Chattanooga. She won her second consecutive time trial title at the 2023 Canadian Road Championship. She went on to represent Canada in the Women's Time Trial at the 2023 UCI Cycling World Championships, finishing in 25th place.

In 2024, Findlay won the Canadian Road Championship time trial for the third consecutive time and followed it up by winning Ironman 70.3 Mont-Tremblant two days later.

Also in 2024, Findlay took part in the PTO's T100 Triathlon series.

Findlay won the 2025 Ironman 70.3 Oceanside in April 2025 and the 2026 Ironman Lake Placid in July 2026.

== Personal life ==
Findlay lives in Bend, Oregon with her partner, Eric Lagerstrom and their dog Flynn. Together, Eric & Paula founded That Triathlon Life, a popular triathlon lifestyle brand and media company, which includes a You Tube channel and podcast. As of 2023, she is sponsored by On Running, Deboer Wetsuits, Specialized, and Castelli Cycling.
