= Svenja Bazlen =

German triathlete (born 1984)

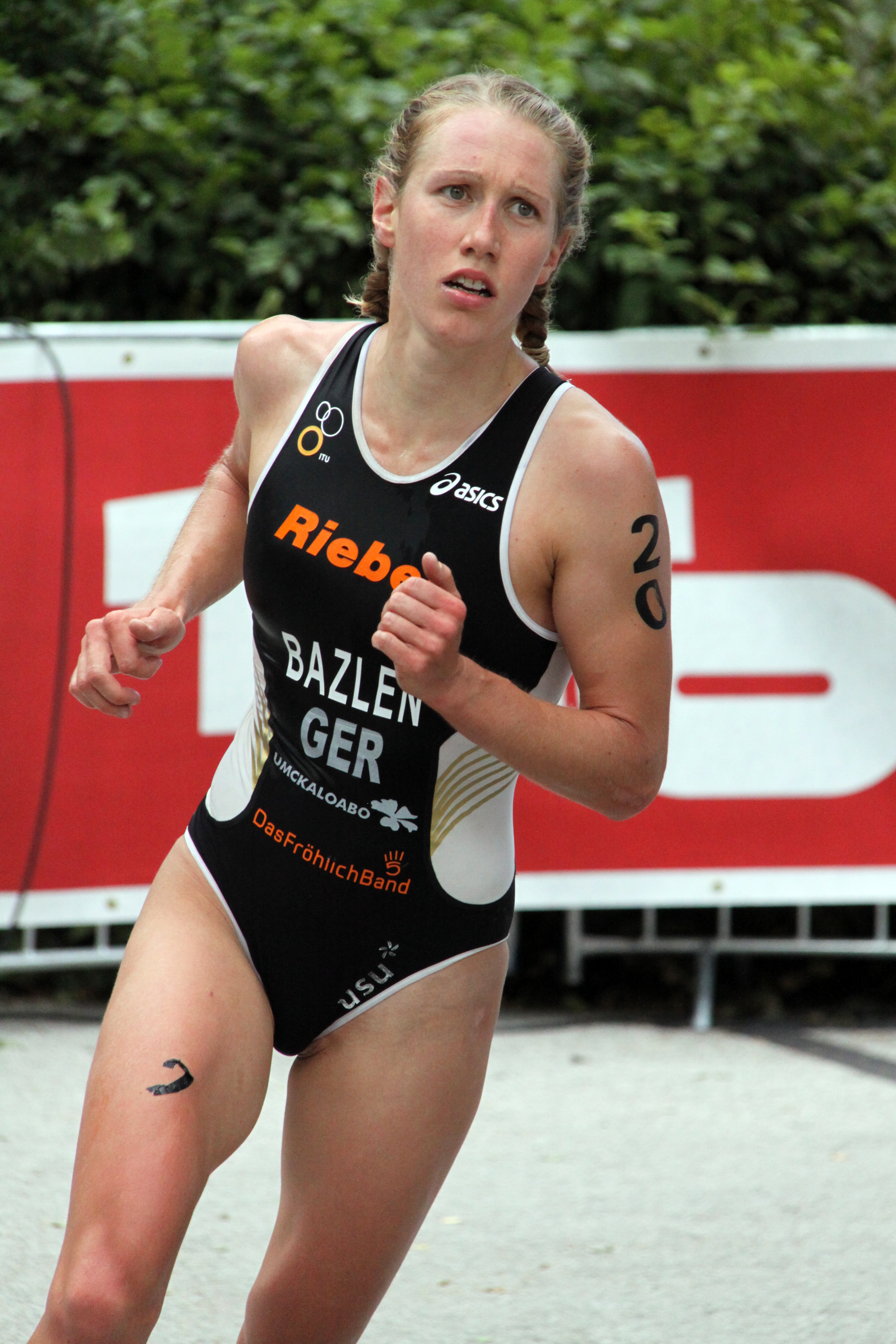
Svenja Bazlen at the World Championship Series triathlon in Kitzbuhel, 2010.

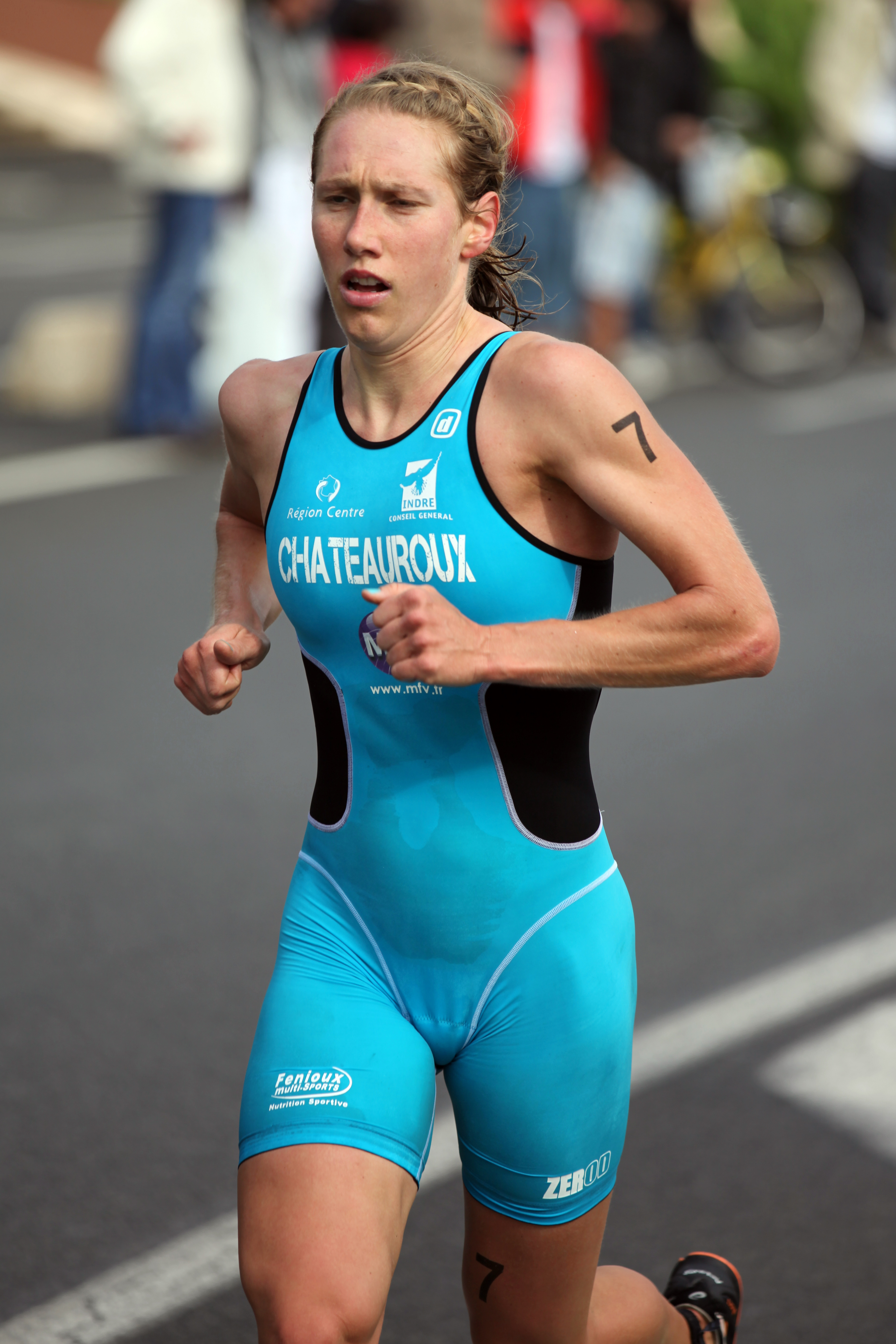
Svenja Bazlen at the Grand Final of the French Club Championship Series in La Baule, 2011.

Svenja Bazlen (born 3 January 1984, in Stuttgart) is a German triathlete, and a reserve member of the National Team (B-Kader). Together with Anja Dittmer she qualified for the Olympic Games in London 2012.

In 2009, Svenja Bazlen finished her studies in physical education and moved to Freiburg, where the Olympic high performance centre is located. In France, Bazlen represents the Tri Club Chateauroux 36 in the prestigious French Club Championship Series Lyonnaise des Eaux. In Germany, like Ricarda Lisk she represents VfL Waiblingen.

== ITU Competitions ==
In the five years from 2007 to 2011, Bazlen took part in 30 ITU competitions and achieved 8 top ten positions. Bazlen and Anja Dittmer will represent Germany at the London 2012 Olympics.

The following list is based upon the official ITU rankings and the ITU Athletes's Profile Page. Unless indicated otherwise, the following events are triathlons (Olympic Distance) and refer to the Elite category.

| Date | Competition | Place | Rank |
|---|---|---|---|
| 2007-06-16 | European Cup | Schliersee | 12 |
| 2007-08-30 | BG World Championships (Age Group 20-24) | Hamburg | 1 |
| 2008-04-19 | Premium European Cup | Pontevedra | 16 |
| 2008-05-18 | European Cup | Brno | 3 |
| 2008-06-21 | European Cup | Schliersee | 4 |
| 2008-07-13 | BG World Cup | Tiszaújváros | 12 |
| 2008-08-24 | European Cup (Small States of Europe Championships) | Weiswampach | 6 |
| 2008-09-07 | Premium European Cup | Kedzierzyn Kozle | 10 |
| 2008-09-27 | BG World Cup | Lorient | 23 |
| 2009-05-17 | Premium European Cup | Pontevedra | 2 |
| 2009-05-31 | World Championship Series | Madrid | DNF |
| 2009-07-02 | European Championships | Holten | 15 |
| 2009-07-25 | World Championship Series | Hamburg | 12 |
| 2009-08-15 | World Championship Series | London | 19 |
| 2009-08-22 | World Championship Series | Yokohama | 17 |
| 2010-05-08 | World Championship Series | Seoul | 14 |
| 2010-06-05 | World Championship Series | Madrid | 38 |
| 2010-07-03 | European Championships | Athlone | 23 |
| 2010-07-17 | World Championship Series | Hamburg | 13 |
| 2010-07-24 | World Championship Series | London | 33 |
| 2010-08-14 | World Championship Series | Kitzbuhel | DNF |
| 2010-09-08 | World Championship Series: Grand Final | Budapest | 34 |
| 2011-04-09 | World Championship Series | Sydney | 26 |
| 2011-06-04 | World Championship Series | Madrid | 9 |
| 2011-06-18 | World Championship Series | Kitzbuhel | 9 |
| 2011-07-16 | World Championship Series | Hamburg | 10 |
| 2011-08-06 | World Championship Series | London | 13 |
| 2011-08-20 | Sprint World Championships | Lausanne | 14 |
| 2011-08-21 | Team World Championships (Mixed Relay) | Lausanne | 3 |
| 2011-09-09 | World Championship Series: Grand Final | Beijing | 22 |
| 2012-03-24 | World Cup | Mooloolaba | 19 |

DNF = did not finish · DNS = did not start · BG = the sponsor British Gas
