= David Hauss =

French triathlete

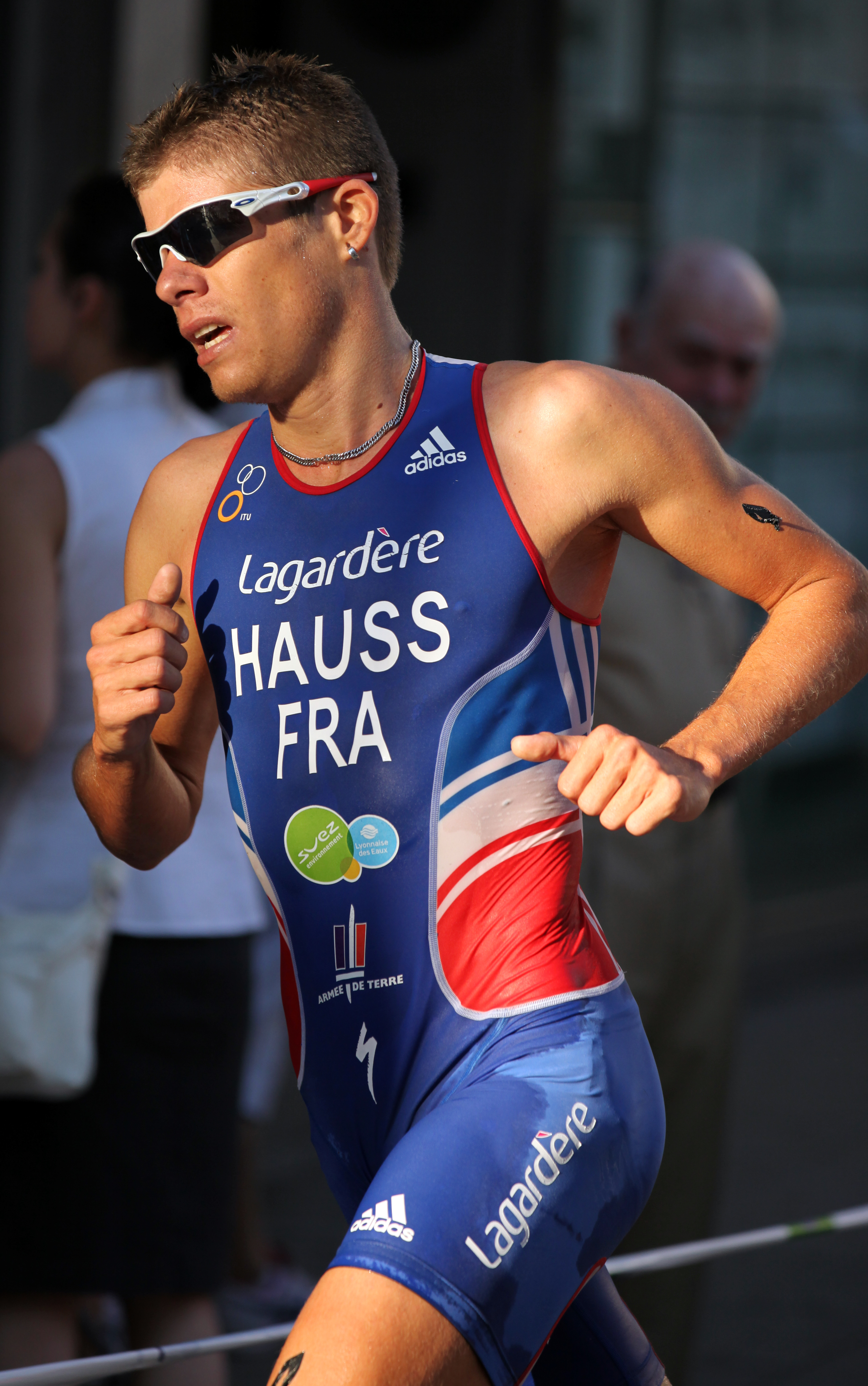
David Hauss at the European Championships in Pontevedra, 2011.

David Hauss (born 1 February 1984, in Paris) is a French professional triathlete and bronze medalist at the European Championships 2010. Thanks to his 7th position at the World Championship Series triathlon in London (7 August 2011), together with Laurent Vidal, he qualified for the Olympic Games 2012, where he finished in 4th place, eighteen seconds behind bronze medalist Jonathan Brownlee.

David Hauss is number 6 in the World Championship Series ranking 2011 and thus the best French elite triathlete. At the French Championship (Olympic Distance) in Villiers-sur-Loir (24 September 2011) he placed 10th.

Like Emmie Charayron, Charlotte Morel, Laurent Vidal and other top triathletes, Hauss belongs to the Military Triathlon Team Equipe de France militaire de triathlon.

Hauss also takes part in the prestigious French Club Championship Series Lyonnaise des Eaux. Like many of the French top triathletes, e.g. Emmie Charayron, he represents Lagardère Paris Racing. At the opening triathlon in Nice (24 April 2011) he placed 6th in the individual ranking and was the second best of his club behind Steffen Justus. At Dunkirk and Paris, Hauss was not present.

In 2015, he is part of ECS Triathlon club.

David Hauss lives in Les Avirons, La Réunion, and in Saint-Raphaël, Var. The Swiss triathlete Melanie Annaheim is his fiancée.

== ITU Competitions ==
In the nine years from 2002 to 2010, David Hauss took part in 55 ITU competitions and achieved 29 top ten positions. The following list is based upon the official ITU rankings and the ITU Athletes's Profile Page. Unless indicated otherwise, the following events are triathlons (Olympic Distance) and refer to the Elite category.

Date	Competition	Place	Rank
2002-07-06	European Championships (Junior)	Győr	8
2002-11-09	World Championships (Junior)	Cancun	2
2003-12-06	World Championships (Junior)	Queenstown	2
2004-05-09	World Championships (U23)	Madeira	19
2004-11-07	World Cup	Rio de Janeiro	13
2005-04-24	World Cup	Mazatlan	17
2005-07-17	European Championships (U23)	Sofia	DNF
2005-07-31	World Cup	Salford	55
2005-09-10	World Championships (U23)	Gamagori	5
2006-05-07	World Cup	Mazatlan	33
2006-06-11	BG World Cup	Richards Bay	57
2007-03-03	African Cup	Langebaan	1
2007-03-31	ATU African Championships	Le Coco Beach	2
2007-05-20	Premium European Cup	Sanremo	3
2007-06-16	European Cup	Schliersee	11
2007-07-21	European Championships (U23)	Kuopio	6
2007-08-30	BG World Championships (U23)	Hamburg	7
2007-09-09	Premium European Cup	Kedzierzyn Kozle	2
2008-04-19	Premium European Cup	Pontevedra	37
2008-05-04	BG World Cup	Richards Bay	27
2008-08-03	European Cup	Egirdir	5
2008-08-24	European Cup and Small States of Europe Championships	Weiswampach	5
2008-09-27	BG World Cup	Lorient	25
2009-03-15	Oceania Cup	Perth	10
2009-03-29	World Cup	Mooloolaba	4
2009-05-31	Dextro Energy World Championship Series	Madrid	15
2009-06-21	Dextro Energy World Championship Series	Washington DC	13
2009-07-02	European Championships	Holten	29
2009-07-11	Dextro Energy World Championship Series	Kitzbuhel	DNF
2009-08-15	Dextro Energy World Championship Series	London	6
2009-08-22	Dextro Energy World Championship Series	Yokohama	DNF
2009-09-09	Dextro Energy World Championship Series, Grand Final	Gold Coast	35
2009-12-19	African Cup	Mauritius	1
2010-03-27	World Cup	Mooloolaba	6
2010-04-11	Dextro Energy World Championship Series	Sydney	3
2010-05-08	Dextro Energy World Championship Series	Seoul	DNF
2010-06-05	Dextro Energy World Championship Series	Madrid	34
2010-07-03	European Championships	Athlone	3
2010-07-17	Dextro Energy World Championship Series	Hamburg	DNF
2010-07-24	Dextro Energy World Championship Series	London	47
2010-08-14	Dextro Energy World Championship Series	Kitzbuhel	9
2010-08-21	Sprint World Championships	Lausanne	3
2010-09-08	Dextro Energy World Championship Series, Grand Final	Budapest	6
2010-10-10	World Cup	Huatulco	11
2010-12-18	African Cup	Mauritius	1
2011-03-26	World Cup	Mooloolaba	3
2011-04-09	Dextro Energy World Championship Series	Sydney	5
2011-06-04	Dextro Energy World Championship Series	Madrid	11
2011-06-18	Dextro Energy World Championship Series	Kitzbuhel	15
2011-06-24	European Championships	Pontevedra	13
2011-07-16	Dextro Energy World Championship Series	Hamburg	3
2011-08-06	Dextro Energy World Championship Series	London	7
2011-08-20	Dextro Energy World Championship Series: Sprint Championships	Lausanne	4
2011-08-21	Team World Championships (4x Mixed Relay)	Lausanne	4
2011-07-16	Dextro Energy World Championship Series, Grand Final	Beijing	7
2012-03-24	World Cup	Mooloolaba	3
2012-04-14	World Triathlon Series	Sydney	4
2012-04-22	World Cup	Ishigaki	1
2012-05-26	World Triathlon Series	Madrid	DNF
2012-06-23	World Triathlon Series	Kitzbuhel	11
2012-08-04	Olympic Games	London	4
2012-08-25	World Triathlon Series	Stockholm	16

DNF = did not finish · BG = the sponsor British Gas
