= Jonathan Zipf =

German triathlete (born 1986)

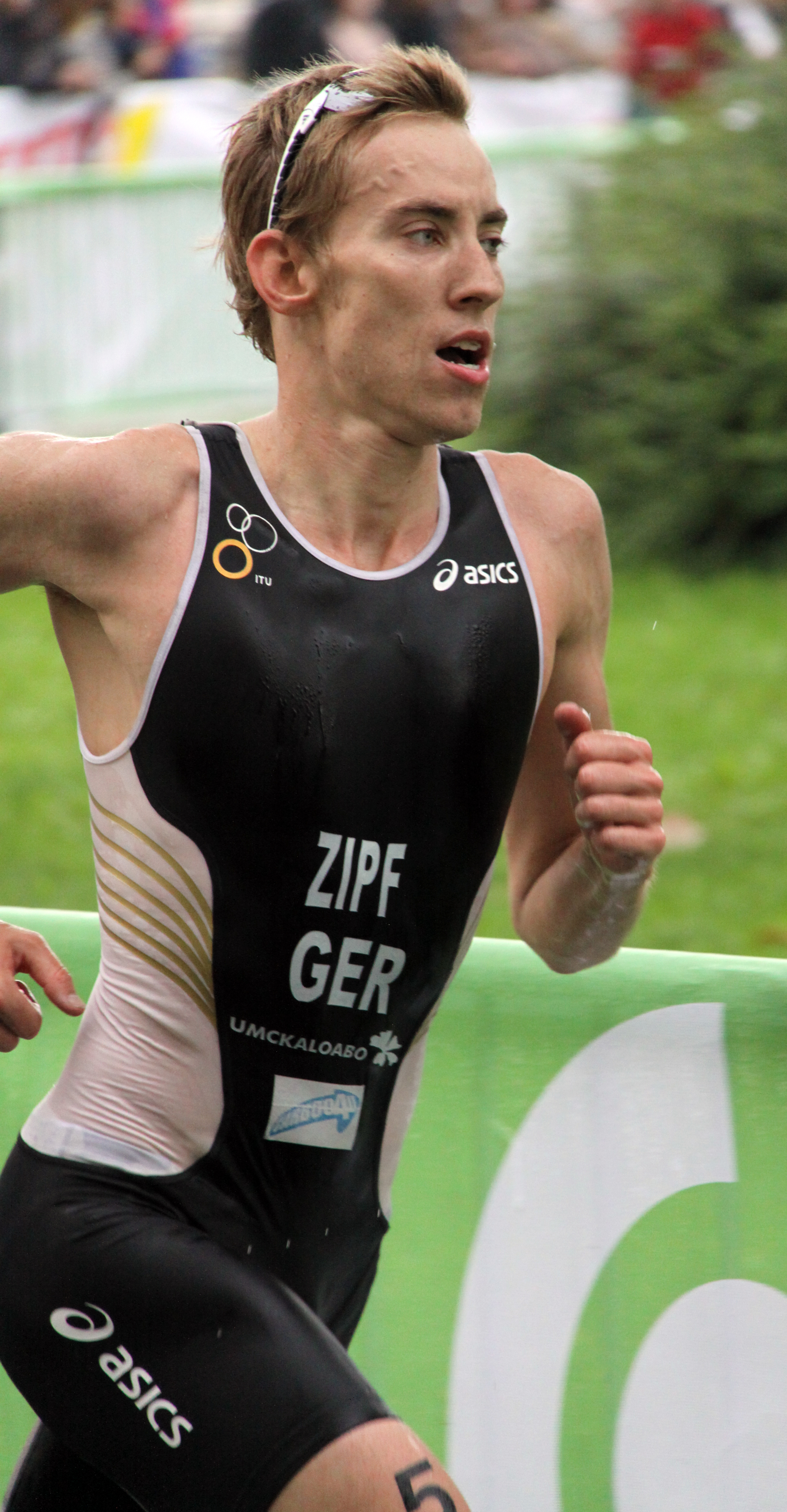
Jonathan Zipf at the Grand Final of the World Championship Series in Budapest, 2010.

Jonathan Zipf (born 20 June 1986 in Herbolzheim-Broggingen) is a German professional triathlete and silver medalist of the 2005 Junior World Championships. In 2010 he was number 31 in the ITU World Championship Series Ranking.

Jonathan Zipf is a member of the military Sportförderung Mainz (Sports Promotion Mainz) High Performance Centre (military rank: Stabsunteroffizier). Until 2010, Zipf represented the German elite club Hansgrohe Team Schwarzwald. Since January 2011, Zipf has represented the EJOT Team TV Buschhütten in the German Bundesliga circuit. In 2010, Zipf also represented the French club Lagardère Paris Racing in the French Club Championship Series Lyonnaise des Eaux. At Beauvais, the only triathlon of this French circuit Zipf attended, he placed 14th and thus was the second best of his club.

== ITU competitions ==
In the eight years from 2003 to 2010, Zipf took part in 32 ITU competitions and achieved 13 top ten positions. The following list is based upon the official ITU rankings and the athlete's profile page.

Unless indicated otherwise, the following events are triathlons (Olympic Distance) and belong to the Elite category.

Date	ITU Competition	Place	Rank
2003-06-21	European Championships (Junior)	Carlsbad (Karlovy Vary)	15
2004-07-03	European Championships (Junior)	Lausanne	10
2005-07-23	European Championships (Junior)	Alexandroupoli(s)	3
2005-07-24	European Championships (Junior Relay)	Alexandroupoli(s)	4
2005-09-10	World Championships (Junior)	Gamagori	2
2006-08-20	European Cup	Geneva	30
2006-09-02	World Championships (U23)	Lausanne	DNF
2006-09-17	Premium European Cup	Kedzierzyn Kozle	11
2007-05-20	Premium European Cup	Sanremo	27
2007-06-10	European Cup	Kusadasi	2
2007-07-07	Premium European Cup	Holten	35
2007-08-11	BG World Cup	Tiszaújváros	43
2007-08-25	European Cup	Split	4
2007-09-09	Premium European Cup	Kedzierzyn Kozle	16
2008-05-18	European Cup	Brno	4
2008-06-14	European Cup	Balatonfured	DNF
2008-06-28	Premium European Cup	Holten	1
2008-07-13	BG World Cup	Tiszaújváros	11
2008-09-27	BG World Cup	Lorient	9
2009-04-26	World Cup	Ishigaki	11
2009-05-17	Premium European Cup	Pontevedra	16
2009-07-02	European Championships	Holten	11
2009-07-25	Dextro Energy World Championship Series	Hamburg	17
2009-08-15	Dextro Energy World Championship Series	London	10
2009-09-09	Dextro Energy World Championship Series, Grand Final: U23 World Championships	Gold Coast	5
2010-05-08	Dextro Energy World Championship Series	Seoul	DNF
2010-06-12	Premium European Cup	Pontevedra	4
2010-07-03	European Championships	Athlone	15
2010-07-17	Dextro Energy World Championship Series	Hamburg	31
2010-07-24	Dextro Energy World Championship Series	London	18
2010-08-14	Dextro Energy World Championship Series	Kitzbuhel	43
2010-09-08	Dextro Energy World Championship Series, Grand Final	Budapest	9

- BG = the sponsor British Gas
- DNF = Did not finish
