= Faye McClelland =

British paratriathlete

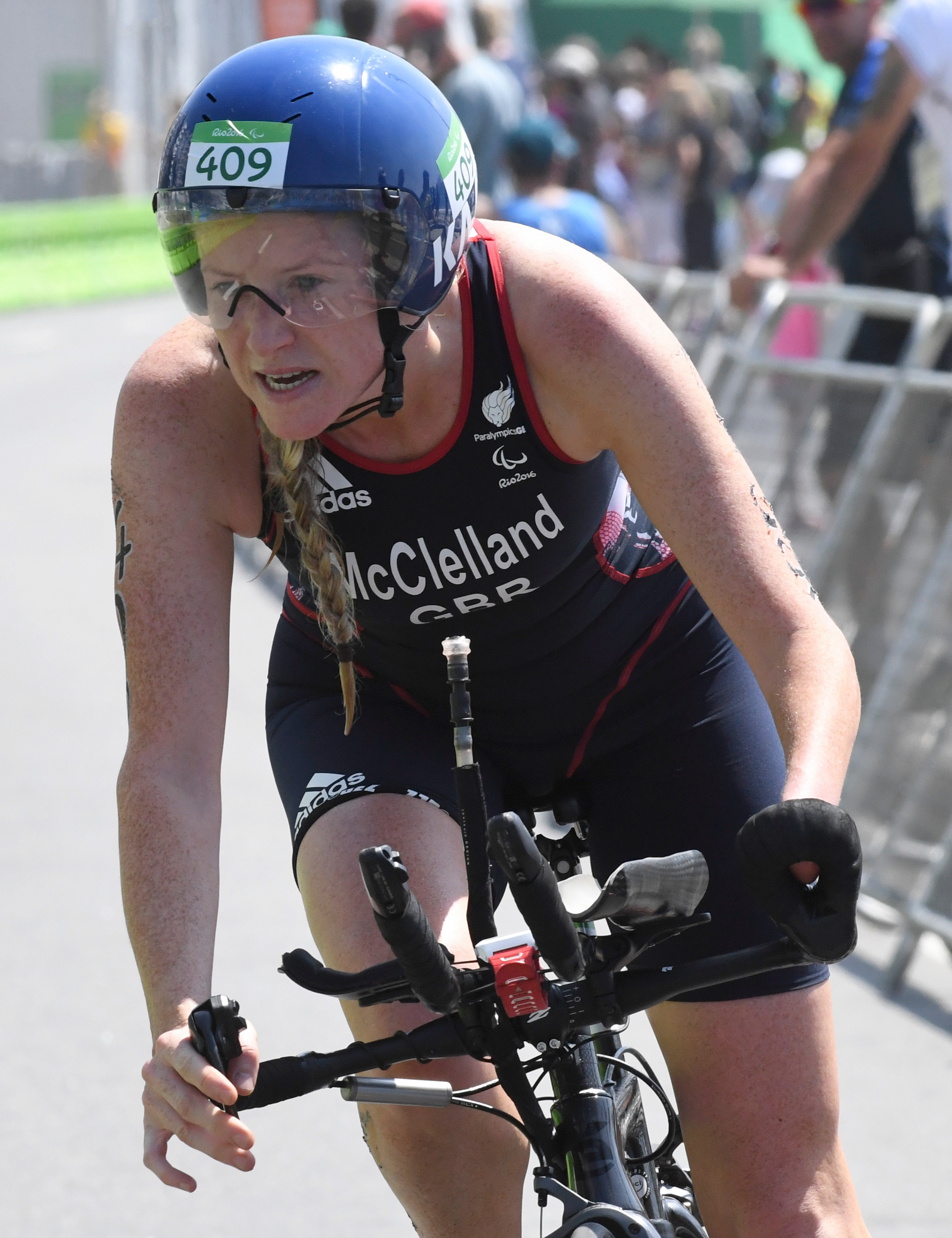
- McClelland at the 2016 Paralympics

Personal information
- Nationality: British
- Born: 3 November 1979 (age 45); Ruislip, London, UK

Sport
- Sport: Paratriathlon

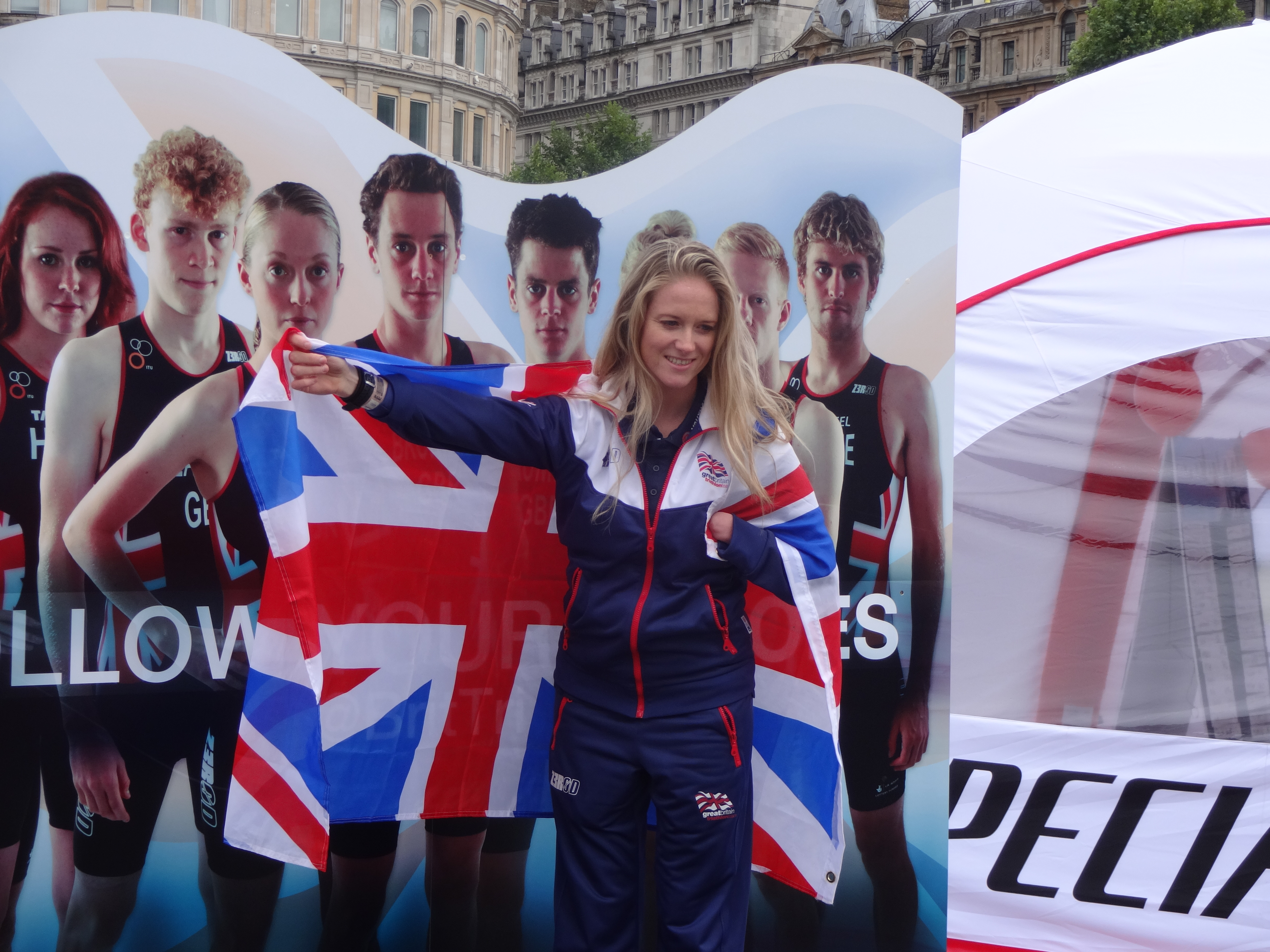
McClelland in 2013

Faye McClelland (born 3 November 1979) is a British paratriathlete who competes in the PT4 category. As of May 2016, she is the 3rd-ranked women's PT4 athlete internationally. She finished fourth at the 2016 Summer Paralympics. Previously she won the ITU world title in her classification in 2010, 2011, 2012 and 2013, placing second in 2014. In 2016 Faye competed in the Paralympics in Rio, placing 4th.

McClelland was coached by the head coach of the GB paratriathlon squad, Jonathan Riall.

== Career results ==
ETU European Triathlon Championships PT4

- 2010 1st Place ETU European Triathlon Championship Athlone, Ireland
- 2011 1st Place ETU European Triathlon Championship Pontevedra, Spain
- 2012 1st Place ETU European Triathlon Championship Eilat, Israel
- 2014 2nd Place ETU European Triathlon Championship Kitzbühel, Austria

ITU World Triathlon Championships PT4

- 2010 1st Place ITU World Triathlon Championship Budapest, Hungary
- 2011 1st Place ITU World Triathlon Championship Beijing, China
- 2012 1st Place ITU World Aquathlon Championship Auckland, New Zealand
- 2012 1st Place ITU World Triathlon Championship Auckland, New Zealand
- 2013 1st Place ITU World Triathlon Championship London, Great Britain

ITU World Triathlon International Events PT4

- 2010 1st Place ITU World Paratriathlon Event London, Great Britain
- 2011 1st Place ITU World Paratriathlon Event London, Great Britain
- 2014 1st Place ITU World Paratriathlon Event Yokohama, Japan
- 2014 2nd Place ITU World Paratriathlon Event London, Great Britain

British Triathlon National Events PT4

- 2014 1st Bexhill Lions Sprint Triathlon Bexhill, East Sussex

== Awards and honours ==
- 2012 Female Paratriathlete of the Year.British Triathlon Federation
- 2013 Female Paratriathlete of the Year.British Triathlon Federation
- 2013 Disabled Sports Personality of the Year. Sussex Sports Awards Brighton
- 2014 Alumnus Award, for Outstanding Sporting Achievement.University of Brighton
- 2014 Female Paratriathlete of the Year. 220 Magazine

== Outside of triathlon ==
McClelland is a qualified physiotherapist and attained her honours at the University of Brighton in the summer of 2013. In January 2014, McClelland and Wes Mechen started a business, Tempo Running Shop, in Eastbourne East Sussex.
