= Schwarzsee (Kitzbühel) =

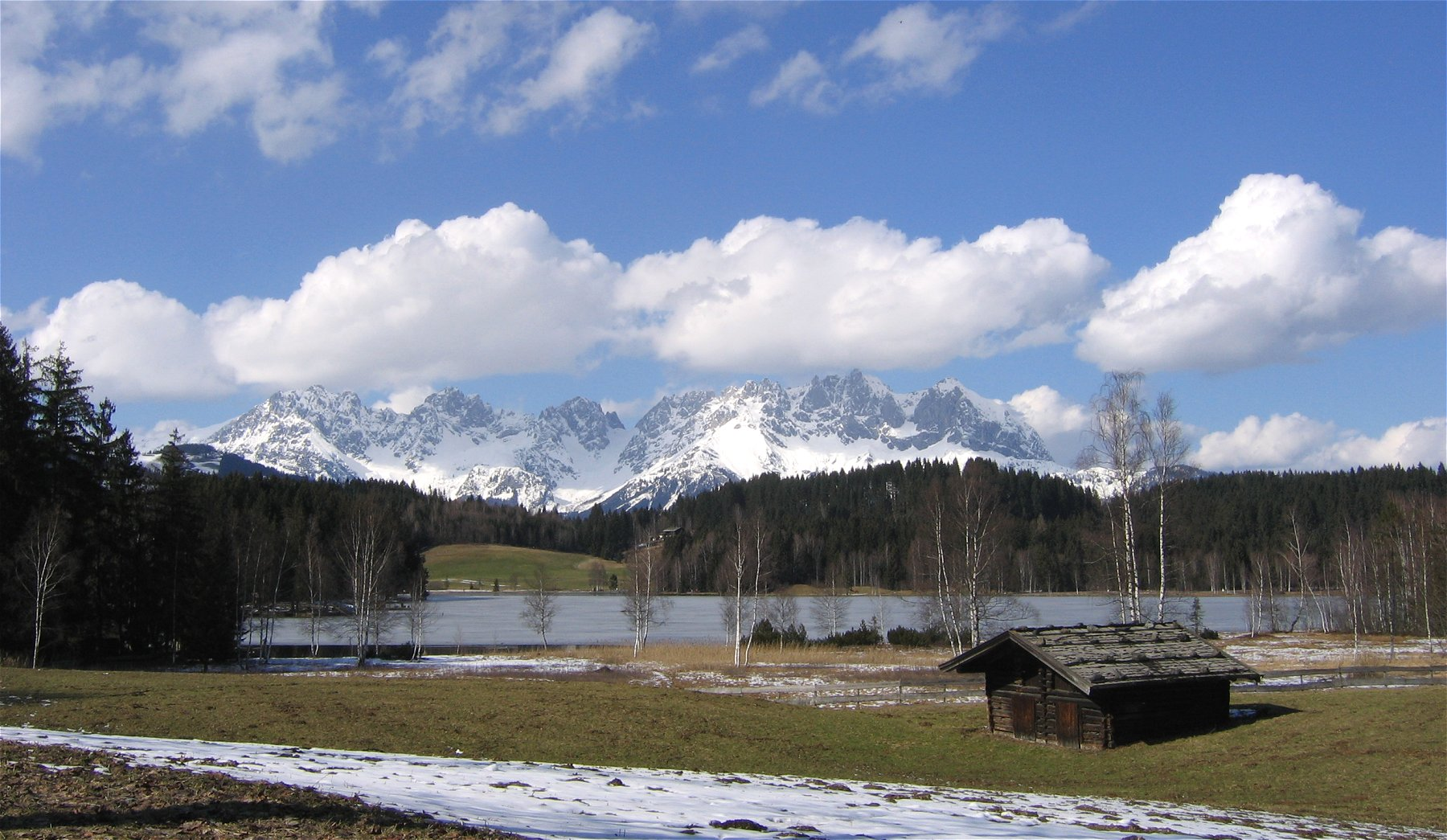

- Location within Austria
- Location: Tyrol, Austria
- Coordinates: 47°27′26″N 12°22′08″E
- Type: lake

Schwarzsee (Kitzbühel) is a moor lake in Tyrol, Austria.
