= Jane Egan =

British paratriathlete

Personal information
- Born: August 25, 1970 (age 55)

Sport
- Sport: Paratriathlon
- Disability class: PT1
Medal record
Paratriathlon
Representing Great Britain
World Championships
Gold medal – first place	2010 Budapest	PT1
Gold medal – first place	2011 Beijing	PT1
Gold medal – first place	2013 London	PT1
Silver medal – second place	2012 Auckland	PT1
Silver medal – second place	2014 Edmonton	PT1
Aquathlon World Championships
Gold medal – first place	2012 Auckland	PT1
European Championships
Gold medal – first place	2010 Athlone	PT1
Gold medal – first place	2011 Pontevedra	PT1
Gold medal – first place	2012 Eilat	PT1
Gold medal – first place	2013 Alanya	PT1
Silver medal – second place	2014 Kitzbühel	PT1
- Updated on 20 April 2014

Jane Egan is a British paratriathlete. She competes using a handcycle and a racing wheelchair. She was 2010, 2011 and 2013 World Champion and 2010, 2011 and 2012 and 2013 European Champion in her classification.

== Early life ==
Egan was born on 25 August 1970. She comes from Kilbarchan, near Glasgow.

== Sport ==
In 2007 Egan underwent surgery for a ruptured Achilles tendon, causing complex regional pain syndrome among other conditions, due to nerve trauma. As a result, she had to give up her career as a lawyer, and needs to use a wheelchair.

Before her disability Egan took part in able-bodied sport. She started to take part in triathlon in 2009 and in 2010 was invited to be classified by the British Triathlon Federation. She is classified as a Tri1 paratriathlete.

In 2010, she came first in both the International Triathlon Union World and European championships. She then retained those titles in 2011. In 2013, she won her third World and 4th European title.

Egan was aiming to participate in the 2016 Summer Paralympics. However, she will not compete as women's triathlon will not be held in her classification.
