= Will Clarke (triathlete) =

British triathlete (born 1985)

Personal information
- Born: 31 January 1985 (age 41) Cambridge, Great Britain

Sport
- Country: Great Britain
- Team: triathlon team
Medal record
Triathlon
Representing Great Britain
ITU Triathlon World Championships
Gold medal – first place	2012	Team
World U-23 Triathlon Championship
Gold medal – first place	2003	World Champion
European U-23 Triathlon Championship
Gold medal – first place	2003	European Champion

William Roger Clarke (born 31 January 1985 in Cambridge, England, Great Britain) is a professional triathlete, World and European U23 triathlon champion 2006, Beijing Olympian and British National Champion 2008 and 2009. He is now racing for Uplace-BMC on the Pro 70.3 circuit.

== Results ==
YEAR	RACE	POSITION	SWIM	BIKE	RUN	RESULT
2011	ITU World Championship Series London	14th	18:17	1:02:10	30:31	1:52:05
2011	ITU World Championship Series Hamburg	2nd	17:31	55:48	29:47	1:44:09
2011	ITU World Championship Series Kitzbühel	4th	17:38	1:02:33	31:37	1:53:08
2011	ITU World Championship Series Madrid	24th	18:25	1:02:44	31:29	1:54:01
2011	ITU World Championship Series Sydney	9th	19:39	59:18	31:16	1:51:19
2011	Mooloolaba ITU Triathlon World Cup	11th	18:00	1:01:38	31:51	1:52:52
2010	ITU World Championship Series Kitzbühel	23rd	18:24	1:02:32	32:43	1:54:47
2010	The London Triathlon	5th	18:04	55:08	34:08	1:50:07
2010	ITU World Championship Series, London, UK	20th	18:51	53:03	30:59	1:43:48
2010	ITU European Championship, Athlone, Ireland	11th	17:40	55:30	31:25	1:46:11
2010	Hy-Vee ITU Triathlon Elite Cup	6th	19:27	58:34	31:29	1:50:39
2010	ITU World Championship Series, Madrid, Spain	12th	18:24	1:03:06	31:56	1:54:48
2010	ITU World Championship Series, Seoul, Republic of Korea	10th	19:28	1:01:47	30:09	1:52:54
2009	ITU World Championship Grand Final, Gold Coast, Australia	11th	17:04	57:56	30:00	1:45:42
2009	London ITU World Championship Series, London, UK	15th	18:46	?	?	1:42:55
2009	The London Triathlon	1st	18:46	54:39	27:45	1:44:29
2009	Kitzbühel ITU World Championship Series, Kitzbühel, Austria	7th	16:32	54:53	31:21	1:44:05
2009	Hy Vee ITU Triathlon Elite Cup, Des Moines, Iowa, US	11th	19:43	57:58	32:28	1:50:40
2009	Washington ITU World Championship Series, Washington, D.C., US	10th	20:51	58:24	30:48	1:50:59
2009	Madrid ITU World Championship Series, Madrid, Spain	14th	18:31	1:02:21	31:19	1:53:49
2009	British National Championship, Strathclyde Park, Glasgow, GB	1st	18:35	59:38	30:39	1:49:35
2009	Ironman 70.3 California, Oceanside, CA, US	7th	22:31	2:21:13	1:13:22	4:00:41
2008	Olympic Games Triathlon, Beijing, China	14th	18:53	58:23	32:18	1:50:32
2008	ITU BG World Cup Des Moines, Des Moines, US	18th	---	---	---	?
2008	ITU BG World Cup Madrid, Madrid, Spain	6th	---	---	---	?
2007	ITU BG World Cup Salford, Salford, UK	8th	---	---	---	?
2006	ITU U23 BG World Triathlon Championships	1st	---	---	---	?
2006	ITU U23 BG European Triathlon Championships	1st	---	---	---	?
2006	Commonwealth Games Triathlon, Melbourne, Australia	6th	---	---	---	1:50:42
