= Anja Dittmer =

German triathlete (born 1975)

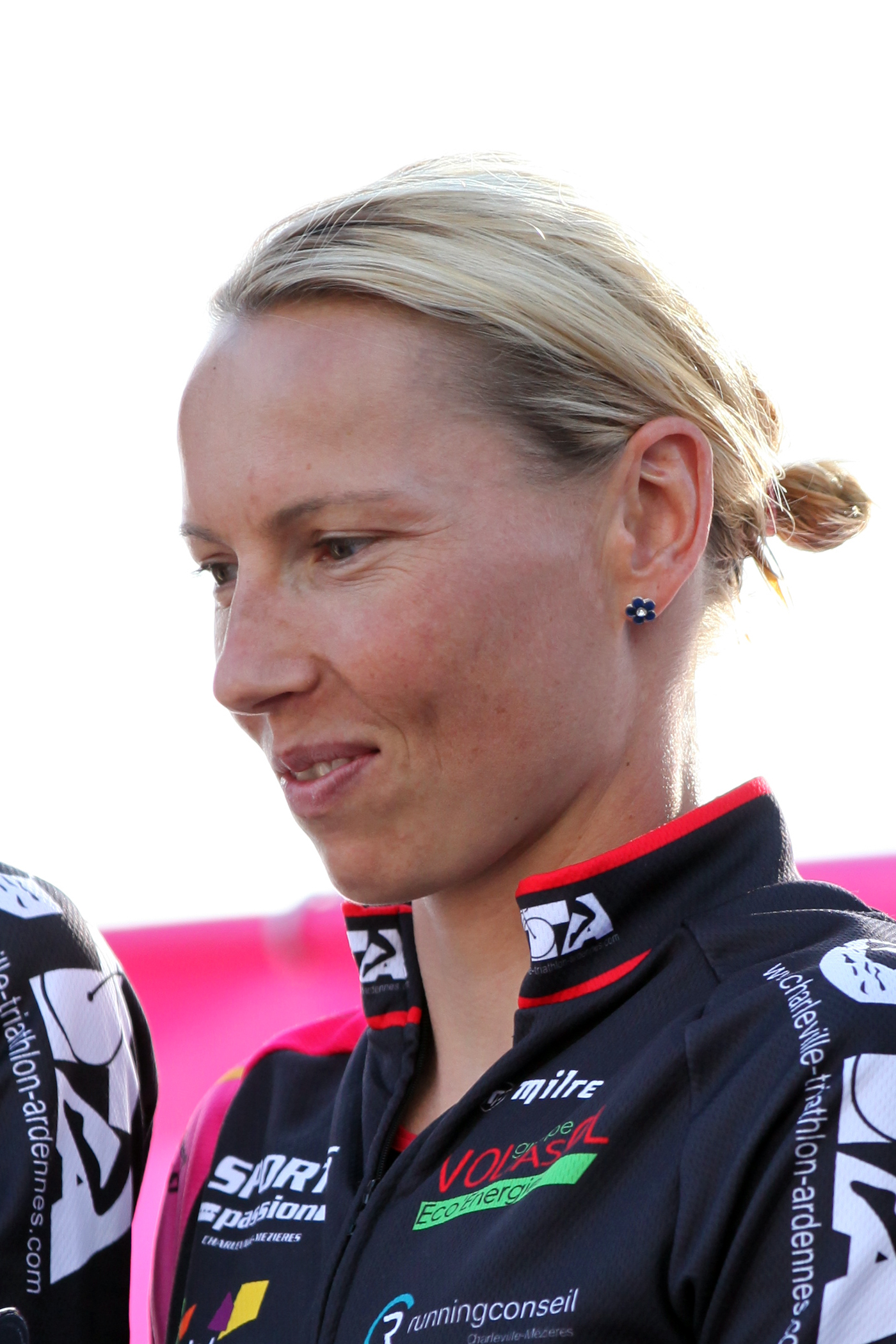
- Anja Dittmer at the French Club Championship Series triathlon in Tours, 2011.

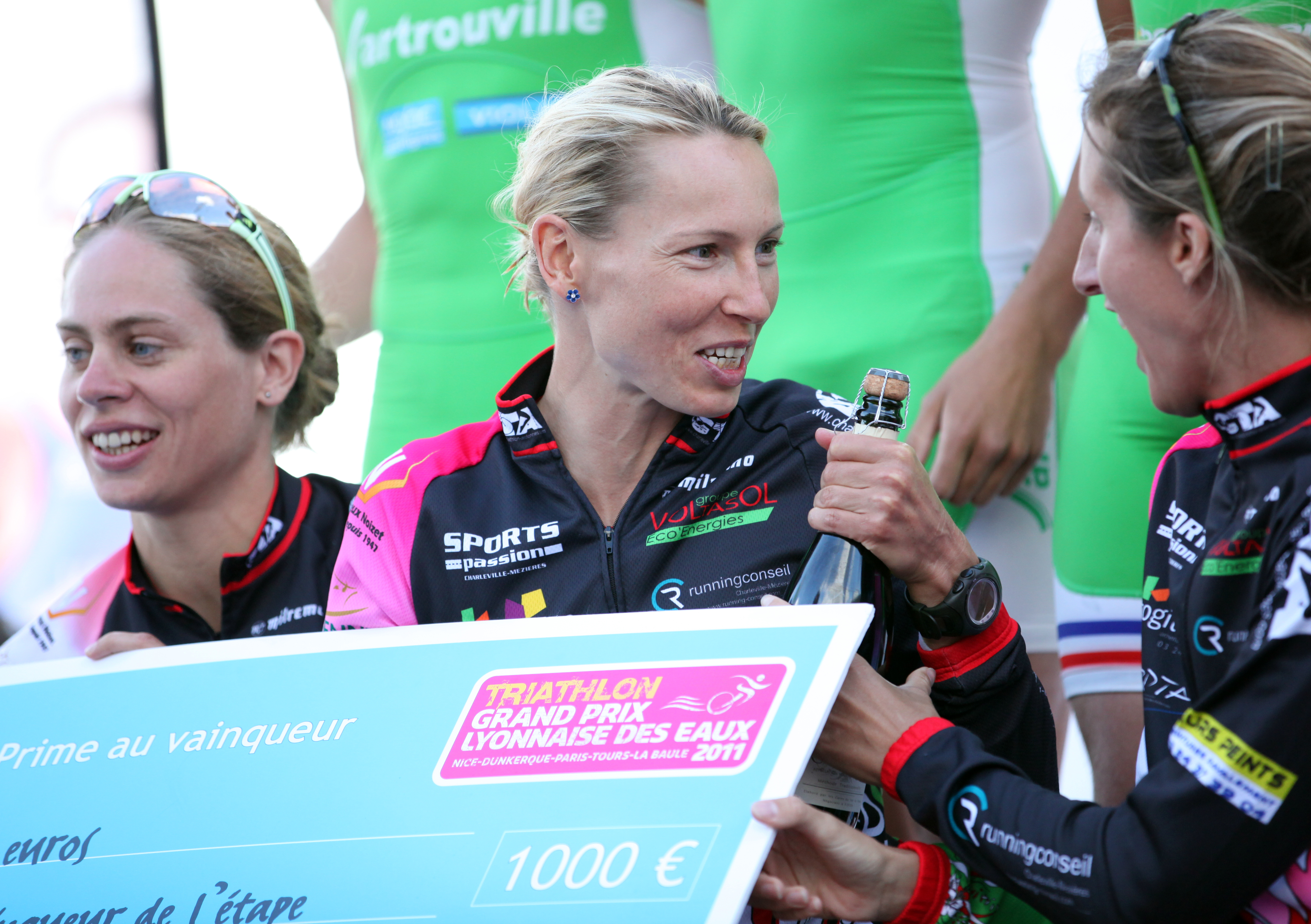
Anja Dittmer with Katrien Verstuyft and Delphine Py-Bilot at Tours, 2011.

Anja Dittmer (born 22 September 1975 in Neubrandenburg) is a professional German triathlete. Dittmer was the only female member of the A-Team (ASICS Olympia Team) of the National Squad, competed at the Olympics four times (Sydney 2000, Athens 2004, Beijing 2008, and London 2012) and was 1999 European Champion and 2006 World Champion.

In 2011, Dittmer joined the high-performance military unit Sportfördergruppe Mainz, ranked as the sub-officer (Stabsunteroffizier). She has studied Sports Management since 2003 and lives in Saarbrücken. Her club is Sportclub Neubrandenburg.

In France, she takes part in the Club Championship Series Lyonnaise des Eaux represents Charleville Tri Ardennes, and was the silver medalist in the French Club Championship Series 2011.

Dittmer last competed at an Elite level in 2014 and in 2023 competed in the 40–49 Age group category of the World Triathlon Sprint & Relay Championships.

== ITU competitions ==
Anja Dittmer participated in four Olympic Games with triathlon competitions, placing 15th (Sydney 2000), 11th (Athens 2004), 33rd (Beijing 2008), and 12th (London 2012) respectively.

From 1994 to 2011, Dittmer took part in 99 ITU competitions and achieved 60 top ten positions, as well as ten gold medals.

The following list is based on the official ITU rankings and the ITU Athletes' Profile Page. Unless indicated otherwise, the following events are triathlons (Olympic Distance) and refer to the Elite category.

Date	Competition	Place	Rank
1994-11-27	World Championship (Junior)	Wellington	8
1995-07-30	European Championships (Junior)	Stockholm	2
1995-11-12	World Championships (Junior)	Cancun	9
1996-07-07	European Championships	Szombathely	26
1996-08-24	World Championships	Cleveland	6
1997-04-13	World Cup	Ishigaki	5
1997-06-29	World Cup	Monte Carlo	23
1997-08-10	World Cup	Tiszaújváros	10
1997-11-16	World Championships	Perth	6
1998-04-12	World Cup	Ishigaki	28
1998-06-21	World Cup	Zurich	28
1998-07-04	European Championships	Velden	22
1998-08-30	World Championships	Lausanne	12
1999-04-11	World Cup	Ishigaki	22
1999-04-18	World Cup	Gamagori	10
1999-06-13	World Cup	Kapelle-op-den-Bos	2
1999-06-20	World Cup	Monte Carlo	7
1999-07-03	European Championships	Funchal	1
1999-08-29	World Cup	Lausanne	13
1999-09-12	World Championships	Montreal	19
2000-04-01	World Cup	Big Island	2
2000-04-16	World Cup	Sydney	14
2000-04-30	World Championships	Perth	5
2000-09-16	Olympic Games	Sydney	18
2001-08-18	World Cup	Tiszaújváros	3
2001-08-25	World Cup	Lausanne	3
2002-04-27	World Cup	St. Petersburg	15
2002-07-06	European Championships	Győr	13
2002-09-07	World Cup	Hamburg	7
2002-09-21	World Cup	Nice	4
2002-11-09	World Championships	Cancun	6
2003-04-26	World Cup	St Anthonys	3
2003-06-21	European Championships	Carlsbad (Karlovy Vary)	23
2003-08-03	World Cup	Tiszaújváros	1
2003-09-06	World Cup	Hamburg	1
2003-09-12	World Cup	Nice	1
2003-10-19	World Cup	Madeira	7
2003-12-06	World Championships	Queenstown	DNS
2004-04-25	World Cup	Mazatlan	2
2004-05-09	World Championships	Madeira	12
2004-08-01	World Cup	Tiszaújváros	1
2004-08-25	Olympic Games	Athens	11
2004-09-04	World Cup	Hamburg	1
2004-09-19	World Cup	Madrid	7
2004-09-26	World Cup	Gamagori	2
2004-10-31	World Cup	Cancun	1
2005-05-01	World Cup	Mooloolaba	11
2005-08-06	World Cup	Hamburg	6
2005-08-28	European Cup	Geneva	4
2005-09-10	World Championships	Gamagori	11
2005-09-17	OSIM World Cup	Beijing	8
2005-11-13	World Cup	New Plymouth	4
2006-05-07	World Cup	Mazatlan	2
2006-06-04	BG World Cup	Madrid	8
2006-06-11	BG World Cup	Richards Bay	2
2006-06-23	European Championships	Autun	2
2006-07-23	BG World Cup	Corner Brook	2
2006-09-02	World Championships	Lausanne	19
2006-09-09	BG World Cup	Hamburg	5
2006-09-24	BG World Cup	Beijing	22
2006-11-05	BG World Cup	Cancun	1
2006-11-12	BG World Cup	New Plymouth	2
2007-03-25	BG World Cup	Mooloolaba	10
2007-05-06	BG World Cup	Lisbon	9
2007-06-03	BG World Cup	Madrid	6
2007-06-29	European Championships	Copenhagen	7
2007-08-30	BG World Championships	Hamburg	6
2007-09-15	BG World Cup	Beijing	5
2007-11-04	BG World Cup	Cancun	7
2008-02-03	Sprint Oceania Championships	Taupo	1
2008-03-09	Oceania Championships	Wellington	6
2008-03-30	BG World Cup	Mooloolaba	10
2008-04-13	BG World Cup	Ishigaki	15
2008-06-21	European Cup	Schliersee	1
2008-07-05	BG World Cup	Hamburg	4
2008-08-18	Olympic Games	Beijing	33
2008-09-27	BG World Cup	Lorient	6
2009-05-02	World Championship Series	Tongyeong	16
2009-05-31	World Championship Series	Madrid	12
2009-06-21	World Championship Series	Washington DC	15
2009-06-27	Elite Cup	Hy-Vee	20
2009-07-25	World Championship Series	Hamburg	7
2009-08-15	World Championship Series	London	5
2009-09-09	World Championship Series: Grand Final	Gold Coast	14
2010-04-11	World Championship Series	Sydney	20
2010-05-08	World Championship Series	Seoul	11
2010-06-05	World Championship Series	Madrid	7
2010-07-03	European Championships	Athlone	13
2010-07-17	World Championship Series	Hamburg	27
2010-07-24	World Championship Series	London	24
2010-08-21	Sprint World Championships	Lausanne	10
2010-09-08	World Championship Series: Grand Final	Budapest	15
2010-10-16	World Cup	Tongyeong	2
2011-04-09	World Championship Series	Sydney	16
2011-06-04	World Championship Series	Madrid	23
2011-06-18	World Championship Series	Kitzbuhel	21
2011-08-06	World Championship Series	London	3
2011-08-20	Sprint World Championships	Lausanne	12
2011-08-21	Team World Championships (Mixed Relay)	Lausanne	3
2011-09-09	World Championship Series: Grand Final	Beijing	49

DNF = did not finish · DNS = did not start · BG = the sponsor British Gas
