= Laurent Vidal =

French triathlete

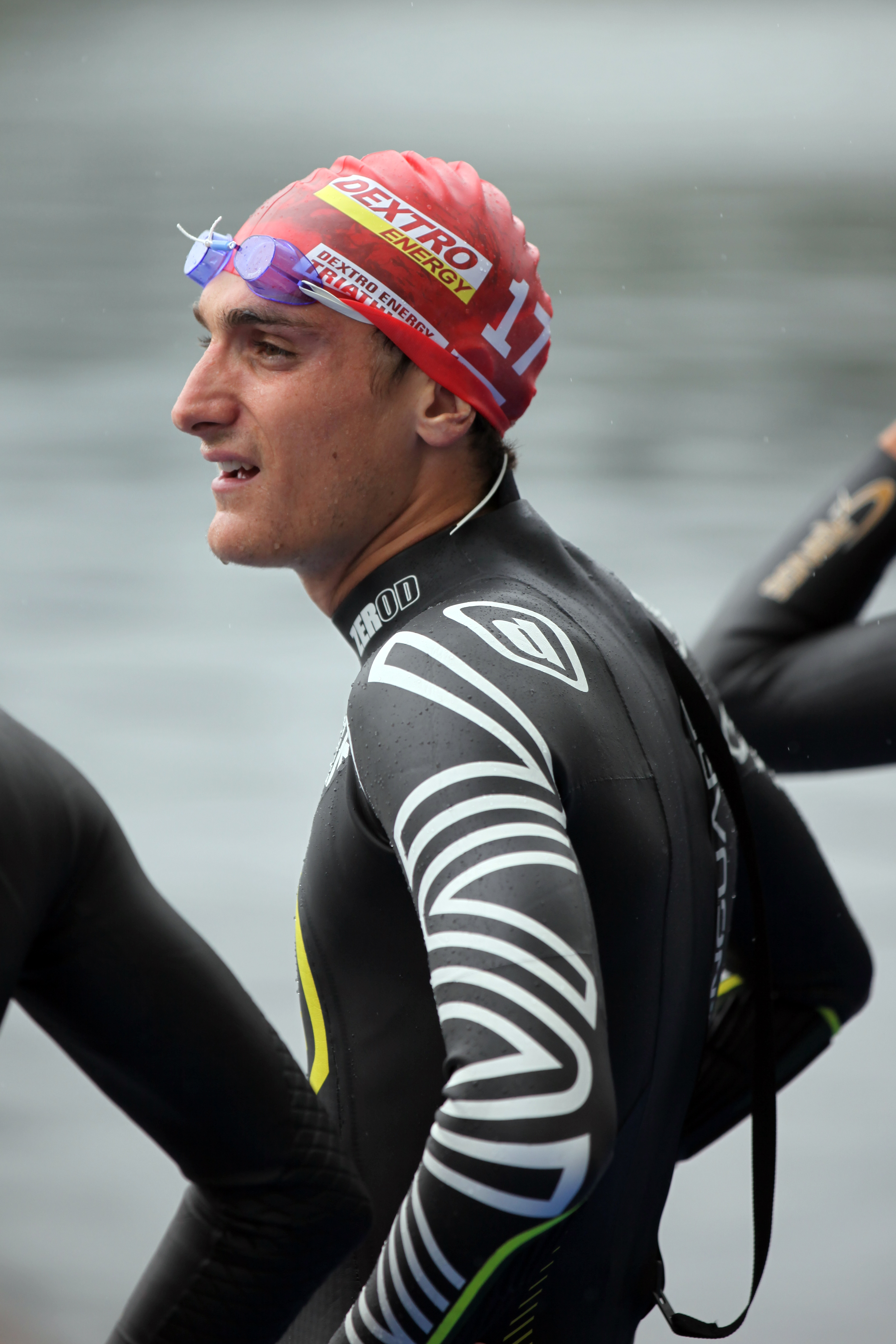
Vidal waiting for the start at the World Championship Series triathlon in Kitzbühel, 2011.

Laurent Vidal (18 February 1984 – 10 November 2015) was a French professional triathlete, three time French Champion (2009, 2011 and 2012) and two time Olympian. In Beijing 2008 he placed 36th while he took the 5th place in London 2012.

Vidal was one of the most consistent performers in the International Triathlon Union Circuit, consistently improving years after years. Laurent Vidal spent his life between Sète, France and Christchurch, New Zealand, the hometown of his fiancée Andrea Hewitt. Vidal had a bachelor's degree in Sports Management.

== Sports career and Death ==
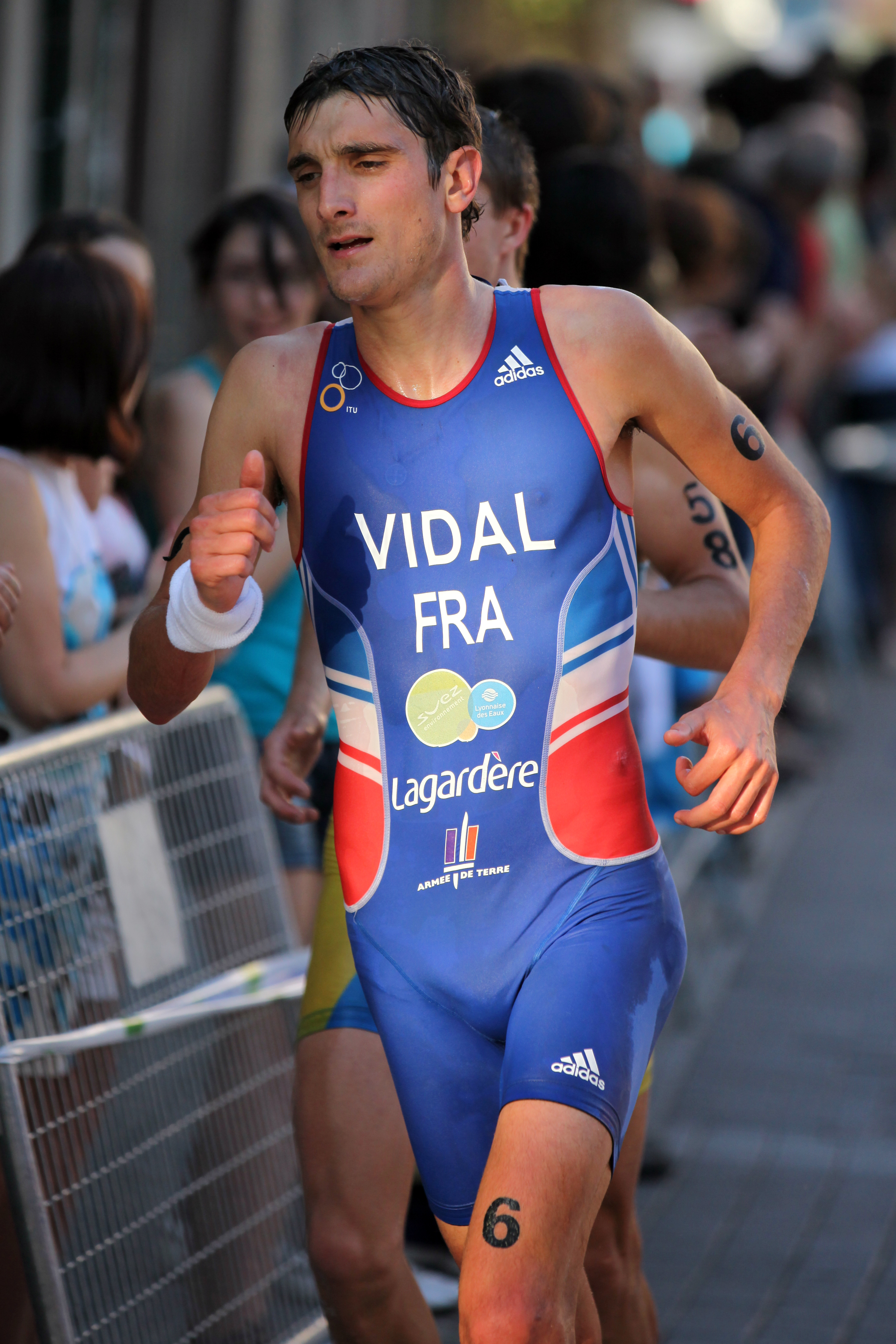
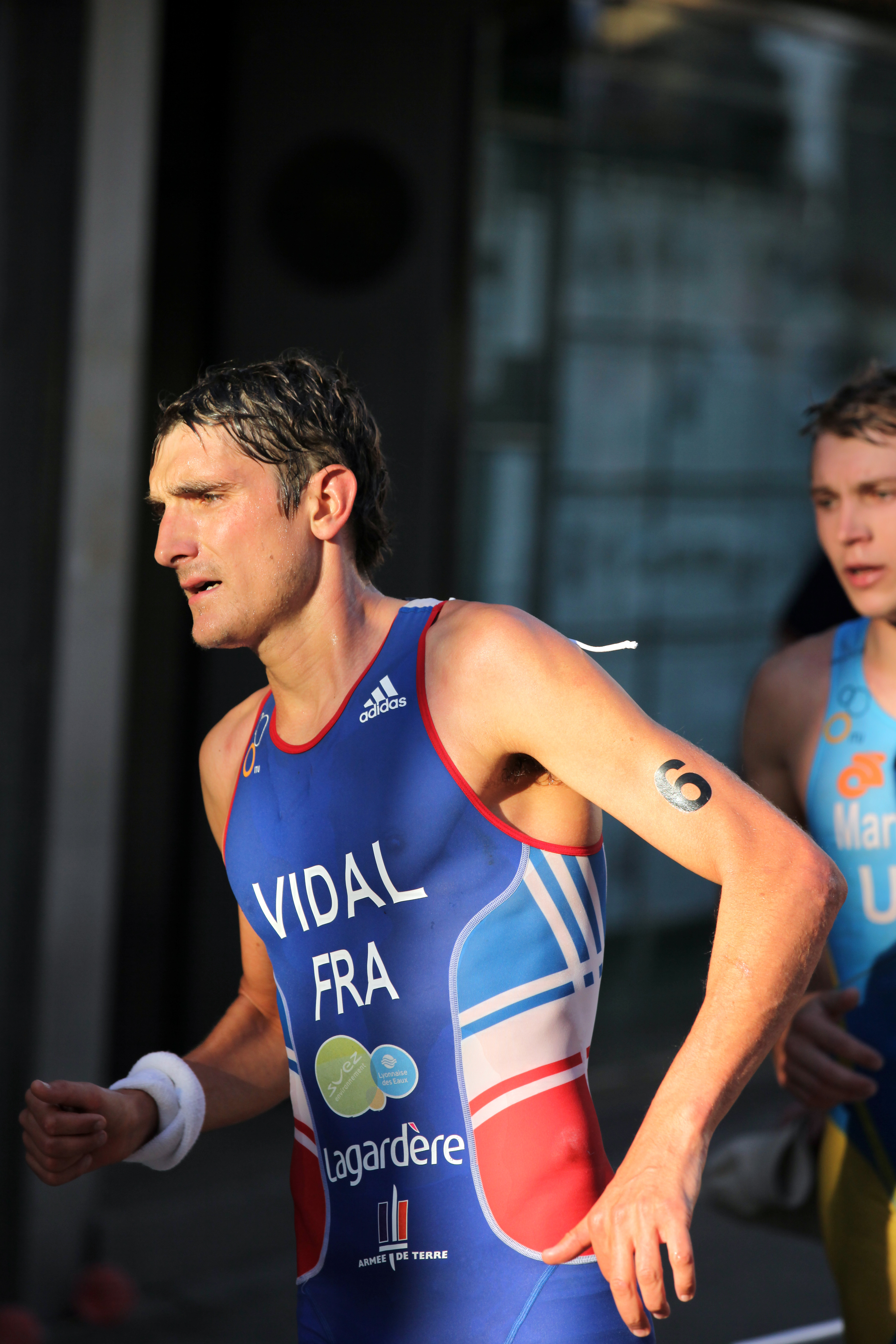
Vidal at the European Championships in Pontevedra, 2011

At his ITU debut in Hungary, Vidal became European Vice Champion (Junior), and one year later in 2003 he placed fourth at the World Championships (Junior) in New Zealand. In 2008, he represented France at the Olympic Games (36th), in 2010 he won the Oceania Championships, and in 2011 he placed 7th at both European and World Championships.

In 2012, he started the year winning the Geelong (Australia) Oceania Cup and the opening round of World Cup Circuit in Mooloolaba ( Australia), followed by a bronze medal at the first World Championship event in Sydney (Australia). In June 2012, he became leader of the ITU Point List for the first time of his career.

In London Olympic Games he crossed the line in 5th position.

He finished 2012 with a win the prestigious GARMIN Alpen-Triathlon in Schliersee, a 3rd national title and placed 7th at world champs.

After a long post Olympic break, Vidal finished 2013 ranked number 7 in the World Triathlon Series ranking, his 4th top 8th since 2009 in this ranking.

In 2013 he also won the Kinloch (NZL) Oceania Cup, the GARMIN Alpen-Triathlon in Schliersee repeating his 2012 performance.

In France, Vidal took part in the prestigious French Club Championship Series and, represented TC Lievin.

In Germany, Vidal was among the international guest stars of EJOT Team Buschhütten, which he represented in the Bundesliga.

Vidal was a member (caporal) of the French Military Triathlon Team (Equipe de France), whose basis is the Ecoles militaires de Draguignan (EMD).

In April 2014 Vidal suffered a cardiopulmonary arrest whilst swimming in Sète, which led to his being placed in an induced coma. As a result, he was forced to retire from competition and focus on his role coaching Hewitt. On 10 November 2015, Vidal died at the age of 31 after cardiac arrest at his home in Gigean, Hérault, France.

== ITU competitions ==
In the nine years from 2002 to 2010, Vidal took part in 53 ITU competitions and achieved 25 top ten positions.

The following list is based upon the official ITU rankings and the ITU Athletes's Profile Page. Unless indicated otherwise, the following events are triathlons (Olympic Distance) and refer to the Elite category.

Date	Competition	Place	Rank
2002-07-06	European Championships (Junior)	Győr	2
2002-11-09	World Championships (Junior)	Cancun	19
2003-06-21	European Championships (Junior)	Carlsbad (Karlovy Vary)	14
2003-12-06	World Championships (Junior)	Queenstown	4
2004-05-09	World Championships (U23)	Madeira	7
2004-09-04	World Cup	Hamburg	DNF
2005-06-05	World Cup	Madrid	DNF
2005-07-17	European Championships (U23)	Sofia	37
2005-07-31	World Cup	Salford	14
2005-09-10	World Championships (U23)	Gamagori	DNF
2005-09-17	OSIM World Cup	Beijing	48
2006-03-03	World Cup	Doha	11
2006-06-11	BG World Cup	Richards Bay	40
2006-06-23	European Championships	Autun	DNF
2006-09-17	Premium European Cup	Kedzierzyn Kozle	24
2006-10-08	European and Pan American Cup, Iberoamerican Championships	Baeza	3
2006-10-18	Premium European Cup	Alanya	3
2006-11-05	BG World Cup	Cancun	45
2007-03-04	Oceania Championships	Geelong	6
2007-03-25	BG World Cup	Mooloolaba	25
2007-05-06	BG World Cup	Lisbon	8
2007-06-03	BG World Cup	Madrid	8
2007-06-29	European Championships	Copenhagen	6
2007-07-22	BG World Cup	Kitzbühel	12
2007-07-29	BG World Cup	Salford	14
2007-08-30	BG World Championships	Hamburg	28
2007-09-15	BG World Cup	Beijing	49
2008-03-09	Oceania Championships	Wellington	DNF
2008-03-30	BG World Cup	Mooloolaba	51
2008-04-06	BG World Cup	New Plymouth	DNS
2008-05-04	BG World Cup	Richards Bay	5
2008-05-25	BG World Cup	Madrid	8
2008-06-05	BG World Championships	Vancouver	16
2008-07-20	BG World Cup	Kitzbühel	6
2008-08-18	Olympic Games	Beijing	36
2008-09-27	BG World Cup	Lorient	5
2008-10-26	BG World Cup	Huatulco	3
2009-03-29	World Cup	Mooloolaba	5
2009-04-05	Oceania Cup	New Plymouth	9
2009-05-02	Dextro Energy World Championship Series	Tongyeong	8
2009-05-31	Dextro Energy World Championship Series	Madrid	13
2009-06-21	Dextro Energy World Championship Series	Washington DC	7
2009-07-02	European Championships	Holten	26
2009-07-11	Dextro Energy World Championship Series	Kitzbühel	3
2009-08-15	Dextro Energy World Championship Series	London	5
2009-08-22	Dextro Energy World Championship Series	Yokohama	4
2009-09-09	Dextro Energy World Championship Series: Grand Final	Gold Coast	9
2010-03-13	Oceania Championships	Wellington	1
2010-04-11	Dextro Energy World Championship Series	Sydney	8
2010-05-08	Dextro Energy World Championship Series	Seoul	21
2010-06-12	Elite Cup	Hy-Vee	12
2010-07-03	European Championships	Athlone	5
2010-07-24	Dextro Energy World Championship Series	London	12
2010-08-14	Dextro Energy World Championship Series	Kitzbühel	DNF
2011-03-26	World Cup	Mooloolaba	12
2011-04-09	Dextro Energy World Championship Series	Sydney	DNF
2011-06-04	Dextro Energy World Championship Series	Madrid	12
2011-06-18	Dextro Energy World Championship Series	Kitzbühel	6
2011-06-24	European Championships	Pontevedra	7
2011-08-06	Dextro Energy World Championship Series	London	6
2011-08-20	Dextro Energy World Championship Series: Sprint World Championships	Lausanne	6
2011-09-09	Dextro Energy World Championship Series, Grand Final	Beijing	5

DNS = did not start · DNF = did not finish · BG = the sponsor British Gas
