= Triathlon at the 2012 Summer Olympics – Women's =

Women's triathlon at the Games of the XXX Olympiad
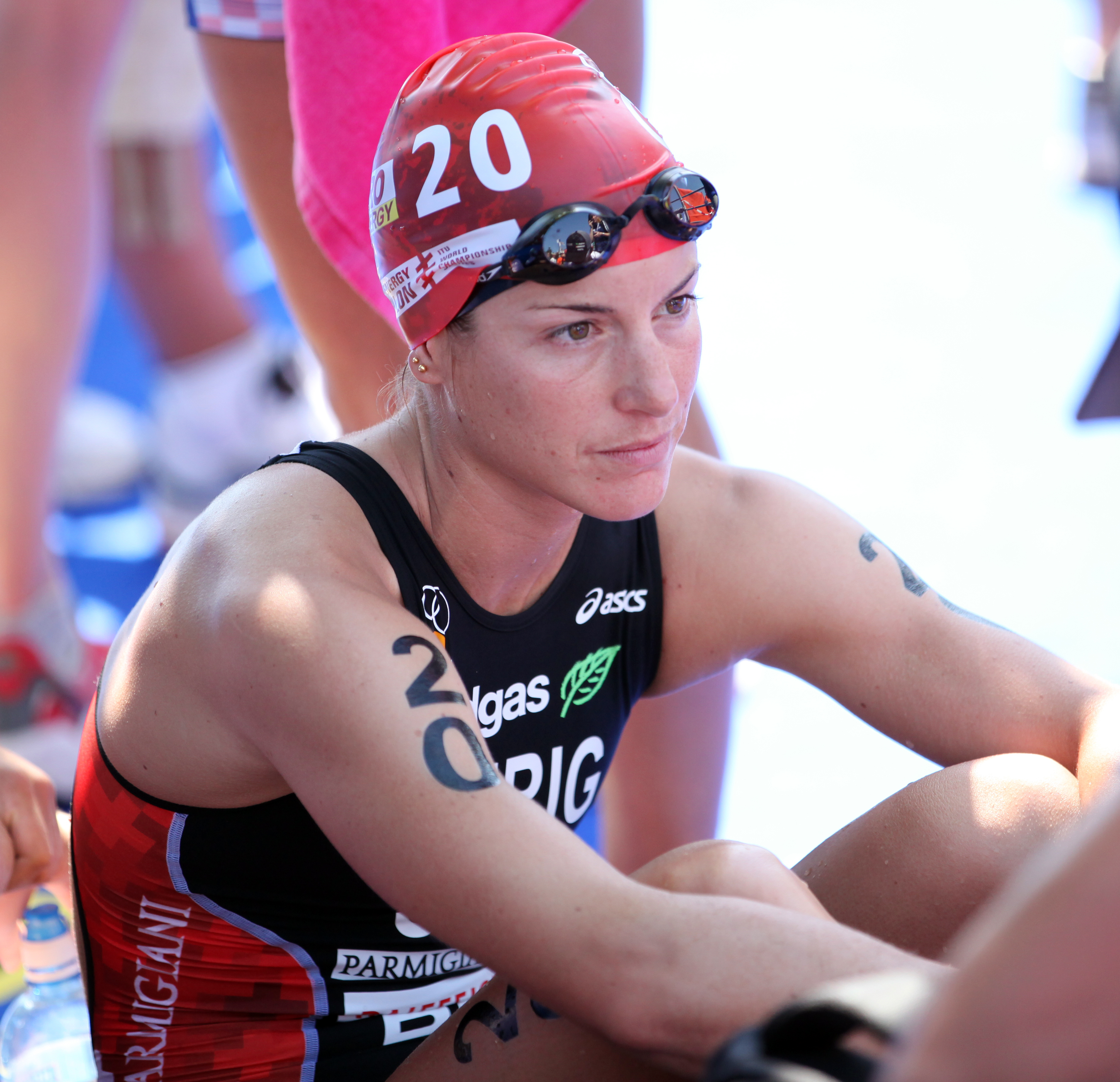
- Nicola Spirig, gold medallist
- Venue: Hyde Park; 54.8 km (34.1 mi)
- Date: 4 August 2012
- Competitors: 55 from 31 nations
- Winning time: 1:59:48

Medalists
1st place, gold medalist(s)		Nicola Spirig	Switzerland
2nd place, silver medalist(s)		Lisa Nordén	Sweden
3rd place, bronze medalist(s)		Erin Densham	Australia

The women's triathlon was one of the triathlon events at the 2012 Summer Olympics in London, United Kingdom. It took place on 4 August 2012, featuring 55 women from 31 countries. It was the fourth appearance of an Olympic women's triathlon event since the first at the 2000 Olympics in Sydney, Australia. The race was around Hyde Park, a 1.42 km^{2} park in central London. The race was held over the "international distance" (also called "Olympic distance") and consisted of 1.5 kilometres (0.93 mi) swimming, 43 kilometres (27 mi) road cycling, and 10 kilometres (6.2 mi) road running.

A sub-twenty degree Celsius Serpentine River met the athletes in the swimming discipline. A group of seven finished the 1,500 metres (1,600 yd) swim leg in a lead group. A couple of athletes crashed on the bike leg, including one of the pre-race favourites, Emma Moffatt of Australia. However, a large lead group of 22 athletes were together at the end of the cycling leg with an over a minute and a half over the rest of the field. A group of five athletes formed on the running leg; Nicola Spirig, Lisa Nordén, Erin Densham, Sarah Groff and Helen Jenkins held together for most of the run. Jenkins (Great Britain) was dropped with two kilometres to go before Groff (United States) was dropped, also on the last lap. In the ensuing sprint finish Spirig (Switzerland) beat Nordén (Sweden) by 15 centimetres in a photo finish with both athletes recording the same time. Densham (Australia) finished two seconds behind Spirig to win the bronze medal with Groff fourth and Jenkins fifth. Switzerland became the first country to win the women's triathlon twice at the Olympics, with Spirig joining Brigitte McMahon (Sydney 2000) as an Olympic champion.

Nordén and the Swedish Olympic Committee appealed against the result of the photo finish in the Court of Arbitration for Sport (CAS) but their appeal was turned down and Spirig retained her gold medal.

== Qualification ==
Qualification for the race was restricted to three athletes per National Olympic Committee (NOC), an organisation representing a country at the Olympics, until eight NOCs had three qualified athletes. Once eight NOCs had qualified three athletes; a NOC was limited to two entries. A NOC with an athlete who won one of the five continental championships (Africa, Asia, Pan America, Europe and Oceania) were given one place in the event. Additionally, three places were available for the NOC of the medallists at the International Triathlon Union (ITU) World Qualification Event. Another 38 places were available to the NOCs with the highest ranked athletes on the ITU Olympic Qualification List on 31 May 2012. If an athlete had already qualified through another method the NOC did not receive another quota with it instead going to the next NOC on the ITU Olympic Qualification List. Five more entries into the event were given to one NOC per continental region. This was based on the ITU Olympic Qualification List with the highest ranked athlete from a non-qualified NOC in their continental region qualifying a place for their NOC in the event. One was given to the Great Britain NOC as the hosts but as they had already gained a place, the host place was given to the highest eligible athlete on the ITU Olympic Qualification List's NOC. The final two places for the event was given to two NOCs chosen by the Tripartite Commission.

For all qualification places the qualified NOC had the right to select any athlete who, by 31 May 2012, were in the top 140 of the ITU Olympic Qualification List, in the top 140 of the 2012 ITU World Triathlon Series or in the top 140 of the ITU Points List.

== Preview ==
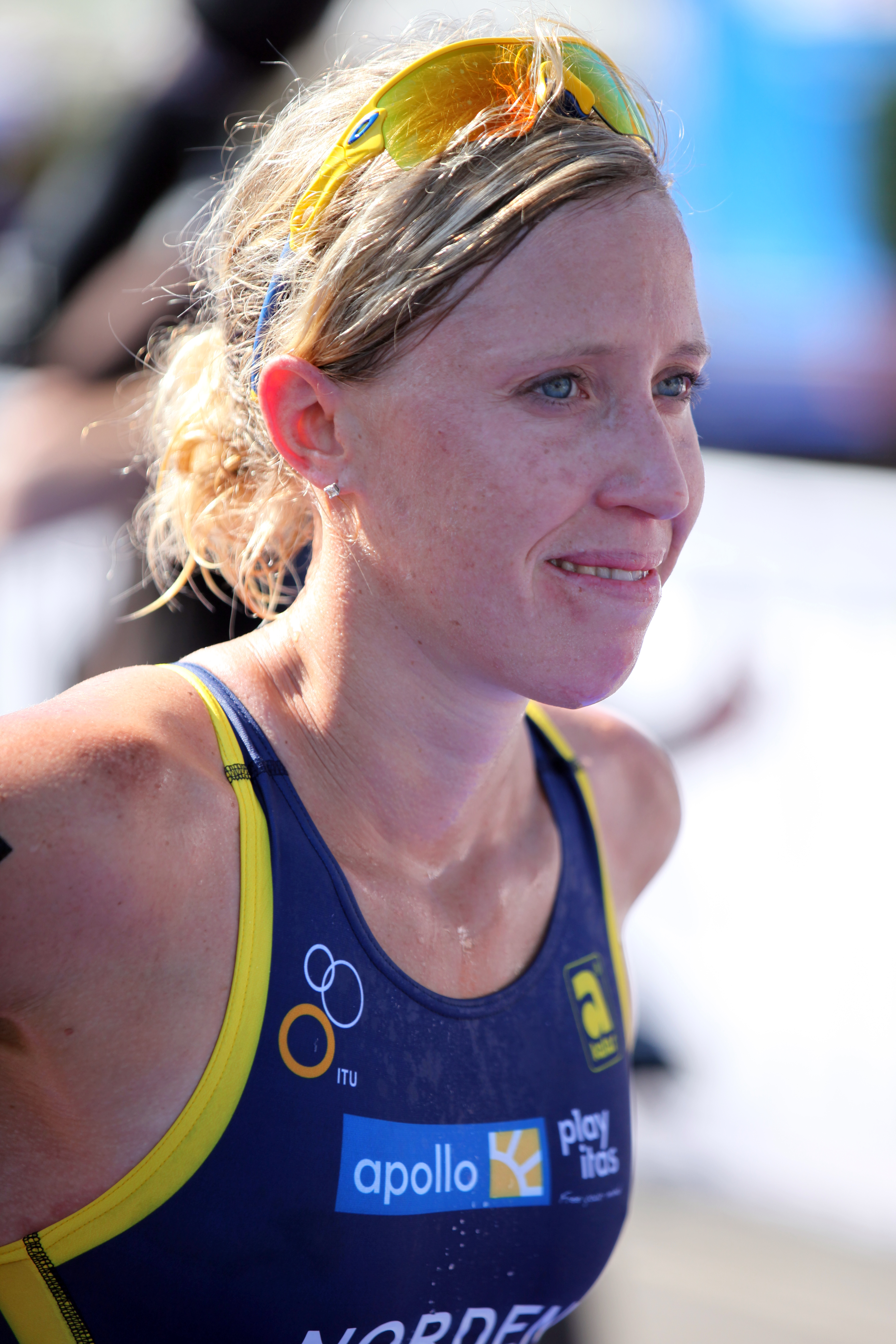
Lisa Nordén, one of the pre-race favourites and eventual silver medallist

Before the race, there were no clear favourites for the gold medal. In a preview written on the ITU website, Merryn Sherwood identified Jenkins, Moffatt, Densham, Spirig and Andrea Hewitt (New Zealand) as favourites. She wrote that she expected Lucy Hall (Great Britain), Hewitt and Densham to be strong on the swim leg along with a few other athletes. Sherwood thought that if that there was a large group of athletes together on the run then many of the competitors would fancy their chances at winning. Sherwood wrote, "Most importantly every athlete will be going into the race knowing they have a chance." Sherwood's thoughts were similar to those of New Zealander Kate McIlroy who said, "It’s funny, the women’s race seems at the moment there is probably 25 girls that could win it on the day." On the website Triathlete Courtney Baird said that the race favourites were Paula Findlay (Canada), Jenkins, Hewitt and Densham.

Moffatt was the only athlete competing in the women's triathlon at the 2012 Olympics that had previously won an Olympic medal. She had won a bronze medal in the 2008 race in Beijing, China. Anja Dittmer was competing in her fourth Olympic triathlon, the only woman in the race doing so. The ITU World Triathlon Series champions of the four previous years in Jenkins (2008 & 2011) and Moffatt (2009 & 2010) were competing. Three countries had athletes competing for the first time in an Olympic triathlon. They were Ecuador (Elizabeth Bravo), Slovenia (Mateja Šimic) and Mauritius (Fabienne St Louis).

Densham won the last ITU World Triathlon Series race before the 2012 Olympics in Hamburg, Germany. She beat Moffatt and Groff to win her second race of the 2012 Series. Hewitt was leading the World Series going into the Olympics.

== Course ==
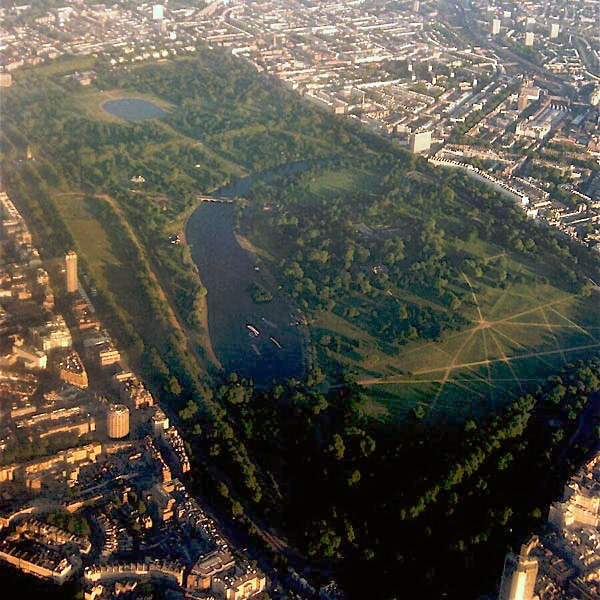
Hyde Park

The event was contested in Hyde Park in Central London, a park opened in 1637. The 1.5-kilometre (0.93 mi) swim started on the north side of The Serpentine and the course was just one lap. After competing in the London leg of the 2011 ITU World Championship Series on the Olympic course Laura Bennett said that the swim was the hardest part of the course: “The swim was the most difficult, it was hard to get away from everyone.” Erin Densham said that: "“The swim is going to play a big role. They have said before you can’t win the race in the swim but you can definitely lose it. Honestly there is no knowing how it’s going to go but it’s going to be hard and fast."After the swim there was then a 200 metres (220 yd) transition zone in front of the main grandstand. The competitors then started a 43-kilometre (27 mi) bike leg consisting of seven 6.137-kilometre (3.813 mi) laps. The cyclists first rode down Serpentine Road towards West Carriage Drive before changing direction and cycling to Hyde Park Corner. The course then quickly turned left towards Hyde Park to go past Buckingham Palace on Constitution Hill. Once passing Buckingham Palace, the cyclists turned and went back towards Hyde Park and eventually crossed through the transition area before starting the next lap. The final discipline was the run. It was four-laps of a 2.5-kilometre (1.6 mi) loop around The Serpentine on flat ground.

The course was designed to be as spectator-friendly as possible. The athletes passed through the main grandstand area 12 times. The women's triathlon was one of the few events with free viewing points.

== Race ==
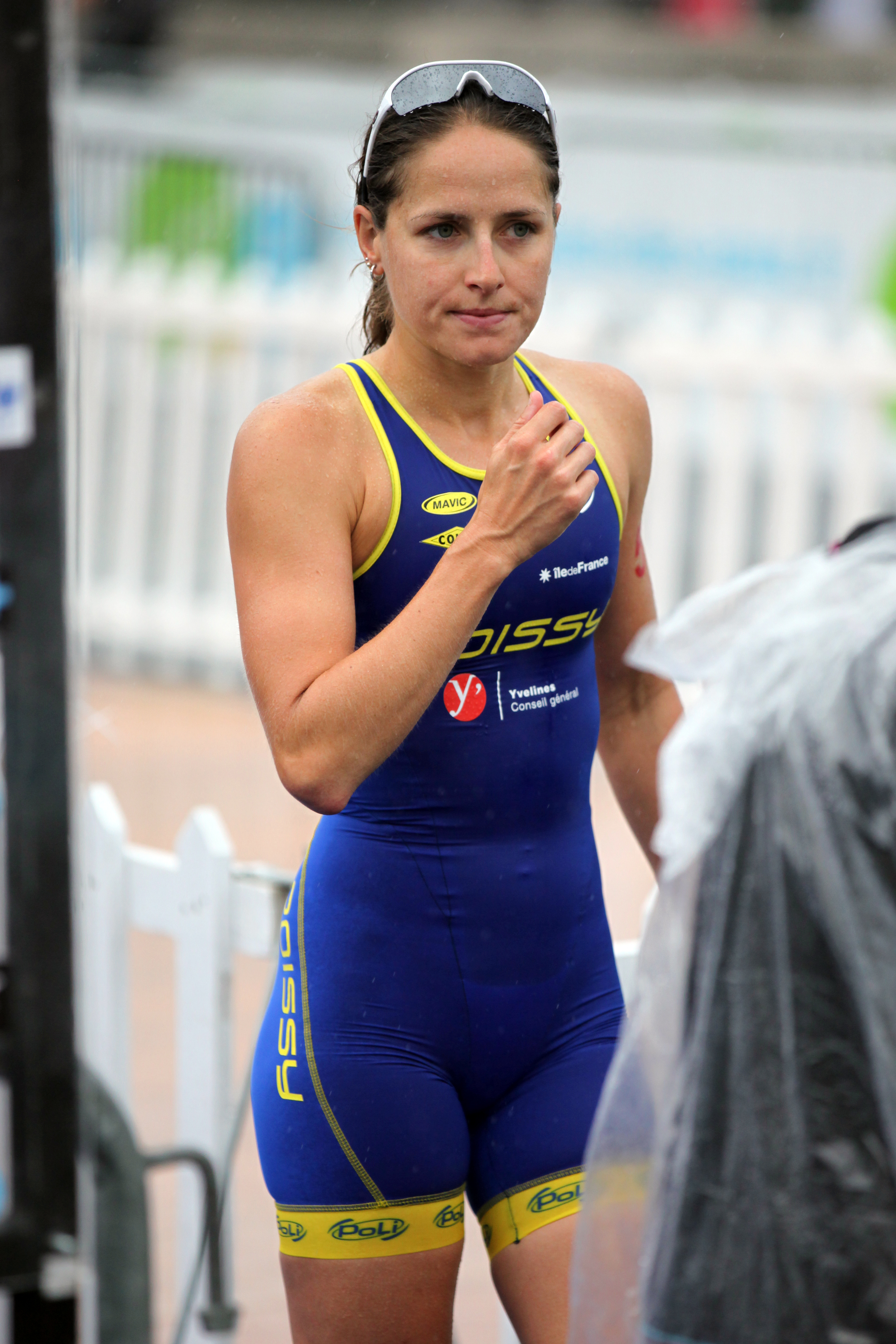
Erin Densham, bronze medallist

The race started at 9:00 a.m. British Summer Time on 4 August 2012. Lucy Hall, the youngest athlete in the race, led early in the swim and finished the swim leg first in a time of 18 minutes and 27 seconds. Hall led a group of seven; Line Jensen (Denmark), Mariko Adachi (Japan), Pâmella Oliveira (Brazil), Claudia Rivas (Mexico), Laura Bennett (United States) and Jessica Harrison (France); out of the water. The seven women had transition one (swimming to cycling) times of between 39 and 44 seconds.

Hall slowed the leading pack down so that her teammate Helen Jenkins could catch-up. The lead pack joined with the peloton at the end of the second cycling lap to form a 22-women strong group. Despite the chase group chasing hard, all 22 athletes finished the cycling leg in the same pack without any additions. There was a time difference of one minute and 44 seconds between the 22nd and 23rd athletes after the bike leg. The quickest individual bike split was shared between two New Zealanders, Andrea Hewitt and Kate McIlroy, who both completed the bike leg in one hour, five minutes and 26 seconds. Due to overnight rain the roads were wet and multiple athletes crashed on the bike leg. Two athletes in Kathy Tremblay (Canada) and Emma Moffatt had to withdraw from the race due to crashing. Moffatt, one of the pre-race favourites crashed on the first lap of the cycling leg. At the second transition (cycling to running) Anne Haug (Germany), who was in the second group, was the quickest through the transition in a time of 27 seconds. Of the leading group most went through in around 30 seconds.

The group quickly separated on the run leg and the lead group was down to eight athletes after one lap of the running course. They were Spirig, Nordén, Densham, Jenkins, Groff and Hewitt, Ainhoa Murúa (Spain) and Emma Jackson (Australia). Jackson was the first to get dropped and was followed by Groff and Murúa. The five remaining athletes finished the second run lap together. The group was then reduced to four when Hewitt was dropped. The American Groff then rejoined the group at the very start of the final run lap after being dropped earlier on in the race. In the ensuing sprint finish between Spirig, Nordén, Densham and Groff, Spirig pushed the pace and held off a fast-finishing Nordén to win by an estimated margin of 15 centimetres. Both athletes recorded a time one hour, 59 minutes and 48 seconds, and were separated by a photo finish. Densham finished two seconds behind Spirig to win bronze. Groff finished fourth with Jenkins fifth, Hewitt sixth, Murúa seventh and Jackson eighth.

After the race, Nordén and the Swedish Olympic Committee appealed against the result in the Court of Arbitration for Sport (CAS). The organisation turned down the appeal and Spirig retained the gold medal.

== Results ==
Key

- # denotes the athlete's bib number for the event
- Swimming denotes the time it took the athlete to complete the swimming leg
- Cycling denotes the time it took the athlete to complete the cycling leg
- Running denotes the time it took the athlete to complete the running leg
- Difference denotes the time difference between the athlete and the event winner
- * The total time includes both transitions
- LAP denotes that an athlete was lapped on the bike course by another athletes and therefore was forced to withdraw

Rank	#	Triathlete	Swimming	Cycling	Running	Total time^{*}	Difference
1st place, gold medalist(s)	43	Nicola Spirig (SUI)	20:04	1:06:03	33:41	1:59:48	
2nd place, silver medalist(s)	20	Lisa Nordén (SWE)	20:04	1:06:02	33:42	1:59:48	0:00
3rd place, bronze medalist(s)	25	Erin Densham (AUS)	20:05	1:06:03	33:42	1:59:50	+0:02
4	53	Sarah Groff (USA)	19:57	1:06:11	33:52	2:00:00	+0:12
5	10	Helen Jenkins (GBR)	20:02	1:06:07	34:10	2:00:19	+0:31
6	32	Andrea Hewitt (NZL)	20:10	1:05:56	34:30	2:00:36	+0:48
7	45	Ainhoa Murúa (ESP)	20:00	1:06:09	34:47	2:00:56	+1:08
8	26	Emma Jackson (AUS)	20:07	1:06:02	35:07	2:01:16	+1:28
9	12	Jessica Harrison (FRA)	19:22	1:06:47	35:13	2:01:22	+1:34
10	33	Kate McIlroy (NZL)	20:12	1:06:02	35:14	2:01:28	+1:40
11	23	Anne Haug (GER)	20:26	1:07:27	33:42	2:01:35	+1:47
12	22	Anja Dittmer (GER)	20:09	1:05:57	35:32	2:01:38	+1:50
13	40	Irina Abysova (RUS)	20:06	1:06:05	35:41	2:01:52	+2:04
14	15	Mariko Adachi (JPN)	19:09	1:07:04	35:51	2:02:04	+2:16
15	30	Vendula Frintová (CZE)	20:12	1:05:59	35:57	2:02:08	+2:20
16	1	Bárbara Riveros Díaz (CHI)	20:22	1:07:38	36:10	2:02:17	+2:29
17	52	Laura Bennett (USA)	19:16	1:06:51	36:10	2:02:17	+2:29
18	11	Emmie Charayron (FRA)	20:27	1:07:32	34:27	2:02:26	+2:38
19	48	Gillian Sanders (RSA)	20:07	1:06:03	36:18	2:02:28	+2:40
20	31	Radka Vodičková (CZE)	19:59	1:06:14	36:21	2:02:34	+2:46
21	5	Claudia Rivas (MEX)	19:12	1:06:59	36:27	2:02:38	+2:50
22	47	Kate Roberts (RSA)	20:03	1:07:55	34:48	2:02:46	+2:58
23	19	Line Jensen (DEN)	19:04	1:07:06	36:37	2:02:47	+2:59
24	44	Marina Damlaimcourt (ESP)	20:04	1:06:06	36:40	2:02:50	+3:02
25	51	Agnieszka Jerzyk (POL)	20:28	1:07:29	34:55	2:02:52	+3:04
26	9	Vicky Holland (GBR)	20:03	1:07:54	34:58	2:02:55	+3:07
27	18	Helle Frederiksen (DEN)	20:16	1:07:44	35:10	2:03:10	+3:22
28	35	Katrien Verstuyft (BEL)	20:28	1:07:30	35:40	2:03:38	+3:50
29	14	Carole Péon (FRA)	19:30	1:07:11	35:59	2:03:58	+4:10
30	49	Pamela Oliveira (BRA)	18:27	1:08:16	36:01	2:04:02	+4:14
31	50	Maria Cześnik (POL)	19:28	1:07:17	36:09	2:04:09	+4:21
32	21	Svenja Bazlen (GER)	19:28	1:05:29	38:01	2:04:11	+4:23
33	8	Lucy Hall (GBR)	18:17	1:06:39	38:24	2:04:38	+4:50
34	16	Juri Ide (JPN)	19:46	1:06:56	36:43	2:04:43	+4:55
35	34	Nicky Samuels (NZL)	19:46	1:07:00	36:50	2:04:48	+5:00
36	4	Rachel Klamer (NED)	19:27	1:07:14	36:59	2:04:59	+5:11
37	39	Mateja Šimic (SLO)	19:31	1:07:11	37:36	2:05:35	+5:47
38	54	Gwen Jorgensen (USA)	19:27	1:11:06	34:44	2:06:34	+6:46
39	17	Ai Ueda (JPN)	20:48	1:09:42	34:48	2:06:34	+6:46
40	42	Daniela Ryf (SUI)	19:49	1:08:28	36:58	2:06:37	+6:49
41	3	Maaike Caelers (NED)	20:49	1:09:41	35:03	2:06:53	+7:05
42	7	Fabienne St Louis (MRI)	19:51	1:06:54	39:38	2:07:37	+7:49
43	28	Aileen Morrison (IRL)	19:36	1:10:59	36:24	2:08:16	+8:28
44	46	Zuriñe Rodríguez (ESP)	19:49	1:06:56	40:41	2:08:44	+8:56
45	36	Flora Duffy (BER)	19:28	1:11:07	37:08	2:08:54	+9:06
46	29	Annamaria Mazzetti (ITA)	19:25	1:11:09	37:19	2:09:08	+9:20
47	41	Alexandra Razarenova (RUS)	19:47	1:10:36	37:27	2:09:11	+9:23
48	2	Lisa Perterer (AUT)	20:17	1:10:12	37:23	2:09:12	+9:24
49	38	Elizabeth Bravo (ECU)	19:50	1:10:44	38:12	2:10:00	+10:12
50	24	Zhang Yi (CHN)	19:49	1:10:39	38:11	2:10:01	+10:13
51	6	Zsófia Kovács (HUN)	19:51	1:10:40	38:50	2:10:39	+10:51
52	55	Paula Findlay (CAN)	19:52	1:10:42	40:16	2:12:09	+12:21
—	27	Emma Moffatt (AUS) (Note: Moffatt crashed on the bike leg.)	19:23	Did not finish			
—	56	Kathy Tremblay (CAN) (Note: Tremblay crashed on the bike leg.)	19:50	Did not finish			
—	37	Yuliya Yelistratova (UKR) (Note: Yelistratova was lapped on the bike leg.)	20:50	LAP			
Sources: Start list; Official results
