= Triathlon at the 2012 Summer Olympics =

Coordinates: 51.5086°N 0.1636°W

Triathlon at the Games of the XXX Olympiad
- Venue: Hyde Park
- Dates: 4 August 2012, 7 August 2012
- Competitors: 110 from 37 nations

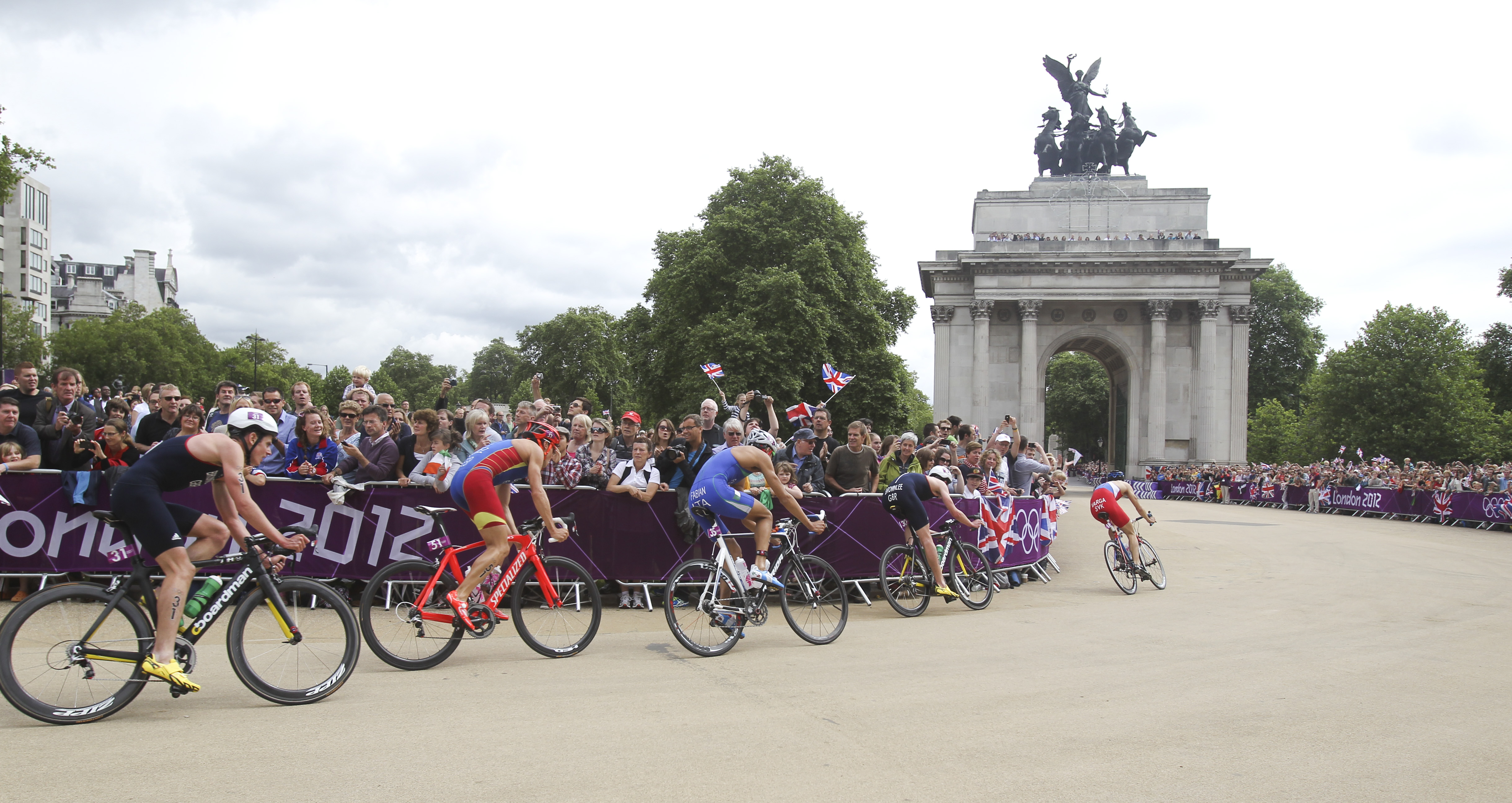
Triathletes riding towards Wellington Arch

The triathlon events at the 2012 Summer Olympics were held in Hyde Park in London, United Kingdom, with the women's triathlon held on 4 August and the men's on 7 August. 110 triathletes from 39 countries competed with 55 men and 55 women competing. The races were held over the "international distance" (also called "Olympic distance") and consisted of 1.5 kilometres (0.93 mi) swimming, 43 kilometres (27 mi) road cycling, and 10 kilometres (6.2 mi) road running.

The men's race was held on 7 August 2012. A group of six finished the 1,500-metre (1,600 yd) swim leg in a lead group. A large lead group of athletes were together at the end of the cycling leg but Alistair Brownlee broke away on the run to win the gold medal with Javier Gómez in second and Jonathan Brownlee in third. The women's race was held on 4 August 2012. A group of seven women finished the swim leg in a lead group. A large lead group of 22 athletes were together at the end of the cycling leg with a gap of over a minute and a half over the rest of the field. A group of five athletes formed on the running leg; Nicola Spirig, Lisa Nordén, Erin Densham, Sarah Groff and Helen Jenkins and held together for most of the run. Jenkins was dropped with two kilometres to go before Groff was dropped, also on the last lap. In the ensuing sprint finish Spirig beat Nordén by 15 centimetres in a photo finish with both athletes recording the same time. Densham finished two seconds behind Spirig to win the bronze medal.

Great Britain topped the medal tally with one gold medal and one bronze medal, both in the men's race. Switzerland became the first nation to win two gold medals in Olympic triathlon and Australia won its fifth medal, the most in Olympic triathlon history to that point.

== Qualification ==
Qualification for the race was restricted to three athletes per National Olympic Committee (NOC), an organisation representing a country at the Olympics, until eight NOCs had three qualified athletes. Once eight NOCs had qualified three athletes; a NOC was limited to two entries. A NOC with an athlete who won one of the five continental championships (Africa, Asia, Pan America, Europe and Oceania) were given one place in the event. Additionally, three places were available for the NOC of the medallists at the International Triathlon Union (ITU) World Qualification Event. Another 38 places were available to the NOCs with the highest ranked athletes on the ITU Olympic Qualification List on 31 May 2012. If an athlete had already qualified through another method the NOC did not receive another quota with it instead going to the next NOC on the ITU Olympic Qualification List. Five more entries into the event were given to one NOC per continental region. This was based on the ITU Olympic Qualification List with the highest ranked athlete from a non-qualified NOC in their continental region qualifying a place for their NOC in the event. One was given to the Great Britain NOC as the hosts but as they had already gained a place, the host place was given to the highest eligible athlete on the ITU Olympic Qualification List's NOC. The final two places for the event was given to two NOCs chosen by the Tripartite Commission.

For all qualification places the qualified NOC had the right to select any athlete who, by 31 May 2012, were in the top 140 of the ITU Olympic Qualification List, in the top 140 of the 2012 ITU World Triathlon Series or in the top 140 of the ITU Points List.

== Course ==
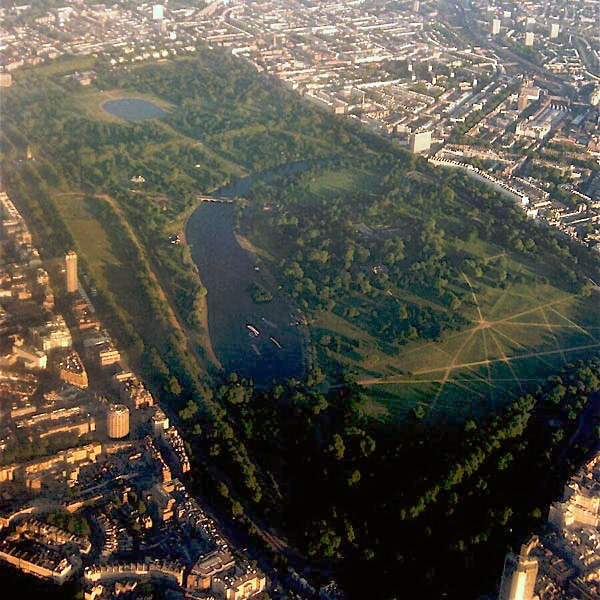
Hyde Park

The events were contested in Hyde Park in Central London, a park opened in 1637. The 1.5-kilometre (0.93 mi) swim started on the north side of The Serpentine and the course was just one lap. After competing in the London leg of the 2011 ITU World Championship Series on the Olympic course Laura Bennett said that the swim was the hardest part of the course: "The swim was the most difficult, it was hard to get away from everyone." Erin Densham said that: "The swim is going to play a big role. They have said before you can’t win the race in the swim but you can definitely lose it. Honestly there is no knowing how it's going to go but it's going to be hard and fast."

After the swim there was then a 200 metres (220 yd) transition zone in front of the main grandstand. The competitors then started a 43-kilometre (27 mi) bike leg consisting of seven 6.137-kilometre (3.813 mi) laps. The cyclists first rode down Serpentine Road towards West Carriage Drive before changing direction and cycling to Hyde Park Corner. The course then quickly turned left towards Hyde Park to go past Buckingham Palace on Constitution Hill. After passing Buckingham Palace, the cyclists turned and went back towards Hyde Park and eventually crossed through the transition area before starting the next lap.

The final discipline was the run, four-laps of a 2.5-kilometre (1.6 mi) loop around The Serpentine on flat ground.

The course was designed to be as spectator-friendly as possible. The athletes passed through the main grandstand area 12 times. The triathlon events were two of the few events with free viewing points.

== Medal summary ==
Event	Gold		Silver		Bronze	
Men's individual	Alistair Brownlee; Great Britain	1:46:25	Javier Gómez; Spain	1:46:36	Jonathan Brownlee; Great Britain	1:46:56
Women's individual	Nicola Spirig; Switzerland	1:59:48	Lisa Nordén; Sweden	1:59:48	Erin Densham; Australia	1:59:50

== Event summary ==
The men's triathlon took place on 7 August 2012, featuring 55 men from 32 countries. Richard Varga (Slovakia) led early in the swim leg and held the lead to come out of the water first. His swim leg split time was 16 minutes and 56 seconds, four seconds faster than Javier Gómez (Spain) and those two; along with Alistair Brownlee (Great Britain), Jonathan Brownlee (Great Britain), Ivan Vasiliev (Russia) and Alessandro Fabian (Italy); formed a lead group of six that had an 11 second gap over the rest of the field. At the transition between the running and cycling legs, Jonathan Brownlee was given a 15 second penalty for riding his bike before the transition zone. On the ride leg the race reformed with a 22-man strong group together for the majority of the discipline. Alistair Brownlee started to run away from the rest of the field at the start of the running leg with only his brother and Gómez attempting to follow him. Jonathan Brownlee was dropped from the group at approximately halfway through the run and then Alistair Brownlee dropped Gómez with 3 kilometres (1.9 mi) to go. Alistair Brownlee would go on to win the race in a time of one hour, 46 minutes and 25 seconds, beating Gómez by 11 seconds. Despite having to serve his time penalty at the end of the second-last running lap, Jonathan Brownlee held on to the bronze medal position, 20 seconds behind Gómez and 18 seconds in front of fourth-placed David Hauss (France). Alistair Brownlee criticised the penalty that he thought cost his brother the silver medal: "I've never been a fan of these penalties, I think they're ruining the sport." Alistair also called the rules "disgusting" and accused triathlon organisers of "ruining" the sport.

The women's triathlon took place on 4 August 2012, featuring 55 women from 31 countries. Lucy Hall (Great Britain), the youngest athlete in the race, led early in the swim and finished the swim leg first in a time of 18 minutes and 27 seconds. Hall led a group of seven; Line Jensen (Denmark), Mariko Adachi (Japan), Pâmella Oliveira (Brazil), Claudia Rivas (Mexico), Laura Bennett (United States) and Jessica Harrison (France); out of the water. In the early stages of the bike leg, Hall slowed the leading pack down so that her teammate Helen Jenkins (Great Britain) could catch-up. The lead pack joined with the peloton at the end of the second cycling lap to form a 22-women strong group. Despite the chase group chasing hard, all 22 athletes finished the cycling leg in the same pack without any additions. There was a time difference of one minute and 44 seconds between the 22nd and 23rd athletes after the bike leg. Due to overnight rain the roads were wet and multiple athletes crashed on the bike leg. Two athletes in Kathy Tremblay (Canada) and Emma Moffatt (Australia) had to withdraw from the race due to crashing. Moffatt, one of the pre-race favourites crashed on the first lap of the cycling leg. The lead group quickly separated on the run leg and the lead group was down to eight athletes after one lap of the running course. They were Nicola Spirig (Switzerland), Lisa Nordén (Sweden), Erin Densham (Australia), Jenkins, Sarah Groff (United States) and Andrea Hewitt (New Zealand), Ainhoa Murúa (Spain) and Emma Jackson (Australia). Jackson was the first to get dropped and was followed by Groff and Murúa. The five remaining athletes finished the second run lap together. The group was then reduced to four when Hewitt was dropped. Groff then rejoined the group at the very start of the final run lap after being dropped earlier on in the race. In the final kilometre Jenkins was dropped by the other four athletes. In the ensuing sprint finish between Spirig, Nordén, Densham and Groff; Spirig pushed the pace and held off a fast-finishing Nordén to win by an estimated margin of 15 centimetres. Both athletes recorded a time one hour, 59 minutes and 48 seconds, and were separated by a photo finish. Densham finished two seconds behind Spirig to win bronze. Groff finished fourth with Jenkins fifth, Hewitt sixth, Murúa seventh and Jackson eighth. After the race, Nordén and the Swedish Olympic Committee appealed against the result in the Court of Arbitration for Sport (CAS). The organisation turned down the appeal and Spirig retained the gold medal.

== Medal table ==
Great Britain was the only nation to win two medals in the triathlon events at the 2012 Summer Olympics with one gold medal and one bronze medal, both in the men's race. Switzerland became the first nation to win a second gold medal in Olympic triathlon after Spirig followed Brigitte McMahon (a gold medalist at the 2000 Summer Olympics) in becoming an Olympic champion. Australia won its fifth Olympic medal with Densham's bronze which is more than any other nation to that point. Sweden, Spain and Great Britain all won their first Olympic triathlon medal.

Rank	Nation	Gold	Silver	Bronze	Total
1	Great Britain	1	0	1	2
2	Switzerland	1	0	0	1
3	Spain	0	1	0	1
3	Sweden	0	1	0	1
5	Australia	0	0	1	1
Totals (5 entries)		2	2	2	6
