= 2012 ITU World Triathlon Series =

- League: ITU World Triathlon Series
- Sport: Triathlon

Men's Series
- Series Champion: Jonathan Brownlee (GBR)
- Points: 4935

Women's Series
- Series Champion: Lisa Nordén (SWE)
- Points: 4531

World Triathlon Series seasons
- 2011 2013

The 2012 ITU World Triathlon Series was a series of eight World Championship Triathlon events that culminated in a Grand Final held in Auckland, New Zealand in October 2012. The series was organized under the auspices of the world governing body of triathlon, the International Triathlon Union (ITU).

The World Triathlon Series (WTS) visited Sydney, San Diego, Madrid, Kitzbühel, Hamburg, London, Stockholm, and Auckland. The series took place during the 2012 Summer Olympic year, with many countries using the results of select series races to determine which athletes would qualify to represent their nation in triathlon at the 2012 Summer Olympics.

The series included two sprint-distance races and six Olympic-distance races. The stop in Stockholm also served as the location for the 2012 ITU Team Triathlon World Championships. The Grand Final in Auckland featured the World Championships for the Under-23, Junior, and Paratriathlon divisions, with each division’s champion determined by a single race. Elite-level competitors were crowned champions in Auckland based on the final WTS point standings.

== Calendar ==
The 2012 series visited eight cities around the world.

Date	Location	Status
September 18–19, 2011	(Japan) Yokohama	Event
April 14	(Australia) Sydney	Event
May 11–12	(United States) San Diego	Event
May 26–27	(Spain) Madrid	Event
June 23–24	(Austria) Kitzbühel	Event
July 21–22	(Germany) Hamburg	Sprint Distance
August 25–26	(Sweden) Stockholm	Sprint Distance
September 30	(Japan) Yokohama	Event
October 20–22	(New Zealand) Auckland	Grand Final

== Results ==
=== Medal summary ===
==== Men ====
Event	Gold	Silver	Bronze
Yokohama	João Silva (POR)	Alex Bryukhankov (RUS)	Dmitry Polyanski (RUS)
Sydney	Steffen Justus (GER)	Richard Murray (RSA)	Laurent Vidal (FRA)
San Diego	Jonathan Brownlee (GBR)	Sven Riederer (SUI)	Richard Murray (RSA)
Madrid	Jonathan Brownlee (GBR)	Alex Bryukhankov (RUS)	Dmitry Polyanski (RUS)
Kitzbühel	Alistair Brownlee (GBR)	Jonathan Brownlee (GBR)	Javier Gómez (ESP)
Hamburg	Richard Murray (RSA)	Javier Gómez (ESP)	Steffen Justus (GER)
Stockholm	Jonathan Brownlee (GBR)	Javier Gómez (ESP)	Vincent Luis (FRA)
Yokohama	João Silva (POR)	Javier Gómez (ESP)	Dmitry Polyanski (RUS)
Auckland	Javier Gómez (ESP)	Jonathan Brownlee (GBR)	Sven Riederer (SUI)
Overall	Jonathan Brownlee (GBR)	Javier Gómez (ESP)	Dmitry Polyanski (RUS)

==== Women ====
Event	Gold	Silver	Bronze
Yokohama	Andrea Hewitt (NZL)	Emma Moffatt (AUS)	Kate McIlroy (NZL)
Sydney	Erin Densham (AUS)	Helen Jenkins (GBR)	Andrea Hewitt (NZL)
San Diego	Helen Jenkins (GBR)	Erin Densham (AUS)	Laura Bennett (USA)
Madrid	Nicola Spirig (SUI)	Aileen Morrison (IRL)	Bárbara Riveros Díaz (CHI)
Kitzbühel	Nicola Spirig (SUI)	Lisa Nordén (SWE)	Andrea Hewitt (NZL)
Hamburg	Erin Densham (AUS)	Emma Moffatt (AUS)	Sarah Groff (USA)
Stockholm	Lisa Nordén (SWE)	Maaike Caelers (NED)	Bárbara Riveros Díaz (CHI)
Yokohama	Lisa Nordén (SWE)	Anne Haug (GER)	Maaike Caelers (NED)
Auckland	Anne Haug (GER)	Gwen Jorgensen (USA)	Bárbara Riveros Díaz (CHI)
Overall	Lisa Nordén (SWE)	Anne Haug (GER)	Andrea Hewitt (NZL)

== Overall ==
=== Men ===
Rank	Athlete	Points
Gold medal	Jonathan Brownlee (GBR)	4935
Silver medal	Javier Gómez (ESP)	4845
Bronze medal	Dmitry Polyanski (RUS)	3822
4	Sven Riederer (SUI)	3773
5	Richard Murray (RSA)	3575
6	Steffen Justus (GER)	3564
7	Alexander Bryukhankov (RUS)	3285
8	Laurent Vidal (FRA)	2772
9	João Silva (POR)	2682
10	David Hauss (FRA)	2519

=== Women ===
Rank	Athlete	Points
Gold medal	Lisa Nordén (SWE)	4531
Silver medal	Anne Haug (GER)	4340
Bronze medal	Andrea Hewitt (NZL)	3893
4	Bárbara Riveros Díaz (CHI)	3707
5	Erin Densham (AUS)	3611
6	Nicola Spirig (SUI)	3264
7	Sarah Groff (USA)	3232
8	Ainhoa Murúa (ESP)	3065
9	Gwen Jorgensen (USA)	3048
10	Kate McIlroy (NZL)	3044
