= Vicky Holland =

English triathlete (born 1986)

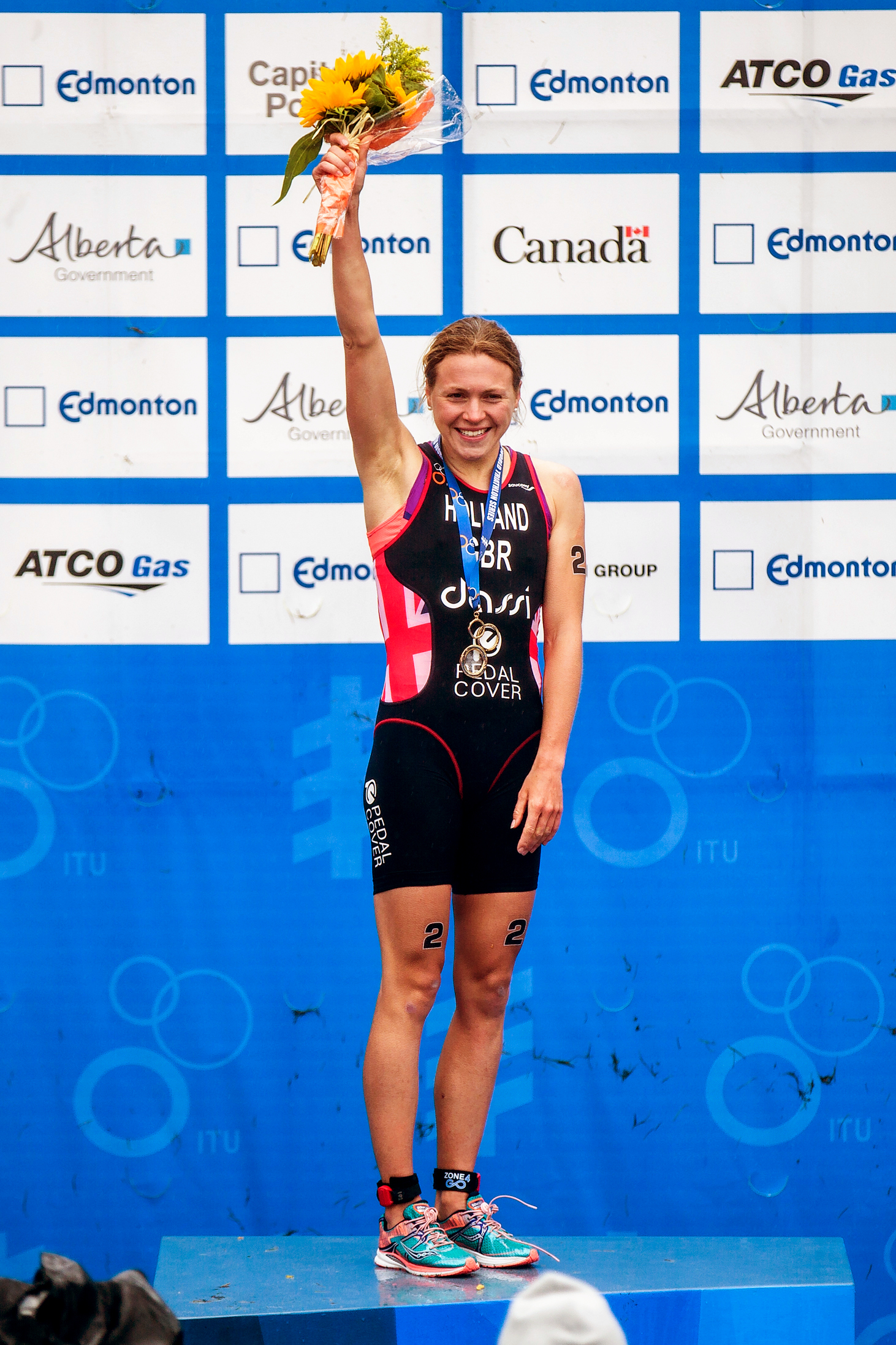

Personal information
- Nationality: British
- Born: 12 January 1986 (age 40) Gloucester, England, United Kingdom

Sport
- Country: Great Britain
- Sport: Triathlon
Medal record
Representing Great Britain
Women's Triathlon
Olympic Games
Bronze medal – third place	2016 Rio de Janeiro	Individual
World Triathlon Championship Series
Gold medal – first place	2018 Gold Coast	Elite
European Triathlon Championships
Gold medal – first place	2024 Vichy	Elite
World Championship Series Races
Gold medal – first place	2018 Gold Coast	Elite
Gold medal – first place	2018 Montreal	Elite
Gold medal – first place	2018 Edmonton	Elite
Gold medal – first place	2018 Leeds	Elite
Gold medal – first place	2015 Edmonton	Elite
Silver medal – second place	2018 Gold Coast	Elite
Silver medal – second place	2018 Bermuda	Elite
Silver medal – second place	2015 Hamburg	Elite
Bronze medal – third place	2016 Leeds	Elite
Bronze medal – third place	2015 Chicago Grand Final	Elite
World Mixed Relay Championships
Gold medal – first place	2014 Hamburg	Team
Gold medal – first place	2012 Stockholm	Team
Silver medal – second place	2018 Nottingham	Team
Bronze medal – third place	2015 Hamburg	Team
ITU Triathlon World Cup
Representing England
Commonwealth Games
Gold medal – first place	2014 Glasgow	Mixed team relay
Silver medal – second place	2018 Gold Coast	Mixed team relay
Bronze medal – third place	2014 Glasgow	Women's Individual

Vicky Holland (born 12 January 1986) is a British former triathlete who was part of the Great Britain and Northern Ireland Olympic team. Holland was the 2018 World Triathlon champion, the fourth British woman to win the title. She was also the first female triathlete to win an Olympic medal for Great Britain, a bronze in 2016, holding off housemate, compatriot and fellow world champion Non Stanford.

A long-time fixture of the English and British mixed relay teams, she is also a 2-time World Mixed Team Champion, and a Commonwealth Games mixed relay champion.

In 2021, aged 35 she competed once more in the women's event at the 2020 Summer Olympics in Tokyo, Japan, but finished off the podium, and was not selected for the mixed team relay. Holland did not qualify for the 2024 Summer Olympics.

In 2024, she won her first European Triathlon Championship at the age of 38, the eighth British woman to win that title. She has five wins in the World Triathlon Championship Series, four of them coming in her Championship-winning year of 2018.

Holland also competed in Super League Triathlon. She was born in Gloucester. As of 2023, Holland is transitioning part-time to broadcasting, forming part of the BBC Sport broadcasting team for the World Triathlon Championship Series.

== Career ==
As of 2012, Holland is 1.68 metres (5 ft 6 in) tall and weighs 59 kilograms (130 lb). She is coached by Darren Smith.

While at school Holland was a nationally ranked swimmer before moving to athletics and taking up the 1,500 metres. She didn't begin competing in triathlon until her second year at Loughborough University when she was approached by British Triathlon.

In the 2010 ITU Triathlon World Cup series Holland placed eighth overall, qualifying her for National Lottery funding as part of the World Class Performance scheme.

At the 2011 ITU Triathlon World Cup event in Hyde Park, London, Hayes finished in 17th position in an event won by compatriot Helen Jenkins over the course for the 2012 Summer Olympics.

In the San Diego leg of the ITU Triathlon World Cup, in May 2012, Holland placed fifth in an event that was won by Jenkins, with fellow British competitor Liz Blatchford finishing 16th. Later the same month at the Madrid event Holland finished seventh, again beating Blatchford who placed tenth.

Holland was selected ahead of Blatchford to represent Great Britain at the 2012 Summer Olympics in the women's triathlon alongside Helen Jenkins and Lucy Hall. The event took place in Hyde Park with the swim being held in the Serpentine. The cycle involved athletes leaving the park via Queen Mother's Gate, travelling through Wellington Arch, down Constitution Hill and on to Birdcage Walk in front of Buckingham Palace before returning to the park to complete the event with a four-lap run around the Serpentine. Holland completed the course in two hours, two minutes, and 55 seconds, 26th in the field.

In 2012 and 2014, Holland became World Champion as part of the British Mixed Team Relay squad, and on 24 July 2014, Vicki secured her first major individual medal, with Bronze at the Commonwealth Games.

Holland took gold in the mixed triathlon team relay at the 2014 Commonwealth Games, with the Brownlee brothers, Alistair and Jonathan, and Jodie Stimpson.

In April 2015 Holland took her first victory in the World Triathlon Series when she won the Cape Town round of the 2015 Series. She followed this up with a second World Series victory in Edmonton and third place in the Grand Final in Chicago which gave her fourth position overall for the year and qualification for the British Olympic team in Rio 2016.

In 2021 Holland completed an all British podium, at Super League Triathlon, London, alongside Jess Learmonth and Georgia Taylor-Brown.

At the 2024 Paris Olympics, she was part of the BBC commentary team for the Triathlon events.
