= Lisa Nordén =

Swedish triathlete

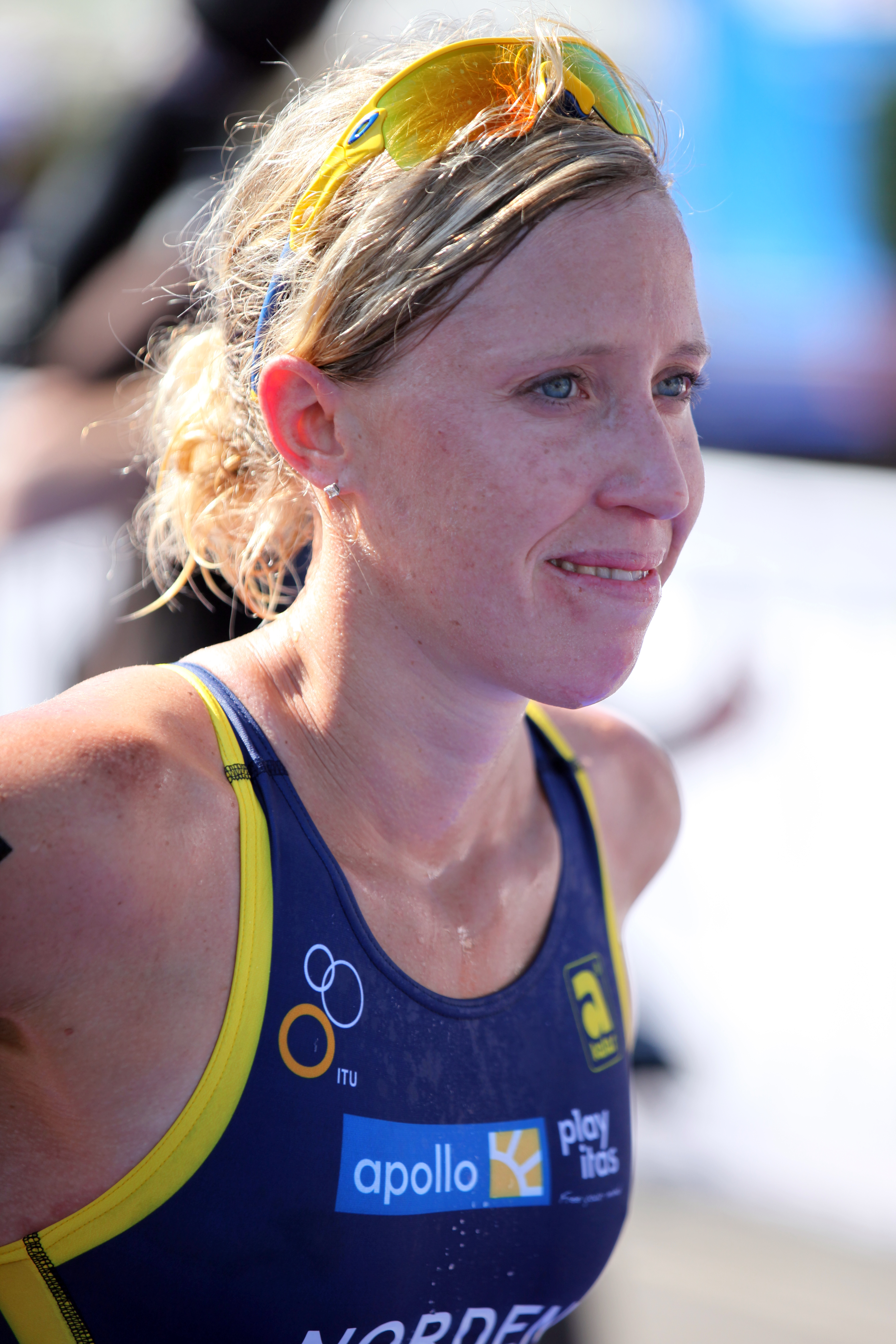
- Nordén at the Sprint World Championships in Lausanne, Switzerland in August 2011

Personal information
- Full name: Lisa Nordén
- Born: 24 November 1984 (age 41) Kristianstad, Sweden
- Height: 1.76 m (5 ft 9 in)
- Weight: 58 kg (128 lb)

Sport
- Sport: Triathlon
- Coached by: Darren Smith
Medal record
Women's triathlon
Representing Sweden
Olympic Games
Silver medal – second place	2012 London	Individual
World Championships
Gold medal – first place	2012	Individual
Silver medal – second place	2009	Individual
Bronze medal – third place	2010	Individual
World Sprint Distance Championships
Gold medal – first place	2010 Lausanne	Individual
U23 World Championships
Gold medal – first place	2007 Hamburg	Individual
European Games
Bronze medal – third place	2015 Baku	Individual
European Championships
Bronze medal – third place	Lisbon 2008	Individual
Bronze medal – third place	Athlone 2010	Individual

Lisa Nordén (born 24 November 1984, Kristianstad, Skåne, Sweden) is a professional Swedish triathlete, 2012 Olympic silver medalist, and 2008 and 2016 Olympian. She is also the winner of the 2012 Triathlon World Series.

Nordén's other accomplishments include Swedish Champion of the year 2008, the U23 World Champion of the year 2007, the Sprint World Champion of the year 2010, vice World Champion (World Championship Series) of the year 2009, bronze medalist of the World Championship Series of the years 2008 and 2010, and bronze medalist at the European Championships 2010. In 2012, Nordén won the Jerring Award.

== Athletic career ==
Nordén took the silver medal in triathlon at the 2012 Summer Olympics in London. She was credited with the same time (1:59.48) as gold medalist Nicola Spirig, but was edged out in a photo finish. The Swedish Olympic Committee (NOC) appealed the result to the Court of Arbitration for Sport (CAS). The appeal was denied the day after it was filed, Nordén said she was happy with her silver medal and considered it a gold medal.

Nordén additionally takes part in non ITU events. In 2010, she won three gold medals at Gladbeck, Witten and Schliersee (German open Championships). She has represented Stadtwerke Team Witten.

In June 2015, she competed in the inaugural European Games, for Sweden in women's triathlon. She earned a bronze medal.

Outside of triathlon, Nordén won the Swedish national cycling time trial championships in 2018, and the Swedish national road cycling championships in 2019.

== Personal life ==
In Sweden, Nordén lives in Stockholm, and represents Terrible Tuesdays Triathlon Club. Her training base is Stockholm since fall 2012.

== ITU World Championship Series podiums ==
Season	Date	Position	Location	Time
2009	31 May	Silver	(Spain) Madrid	2:05:59
2009	25 July	Silver	(Germany) Hamburg	1:57:06
2009	15 August	Silver	(United Kingdom) London	1:54:26
2009	22 August	Gold	(Japan) Yokohama	1:55:55
2009	13 September	Silver	(Australia) Gold Coast^{1}	1:59:19
2010	17 July	Gold	(Germany) Hamburg	1:53:53
2010	14 August	Silver	(Austria) Kitzbühel	2:03:06
2012	23 June	Silver	(Austria) Kitzbühel	2.05:40
2012	25 August	Gold	(Sweden) Stockholm^{2}	1:00:36
2012	29 September	Gold	(Japan) Yokohama	1:59:07

^{1} Grand Final
^{2} Sprint Distance

== Gallery ==
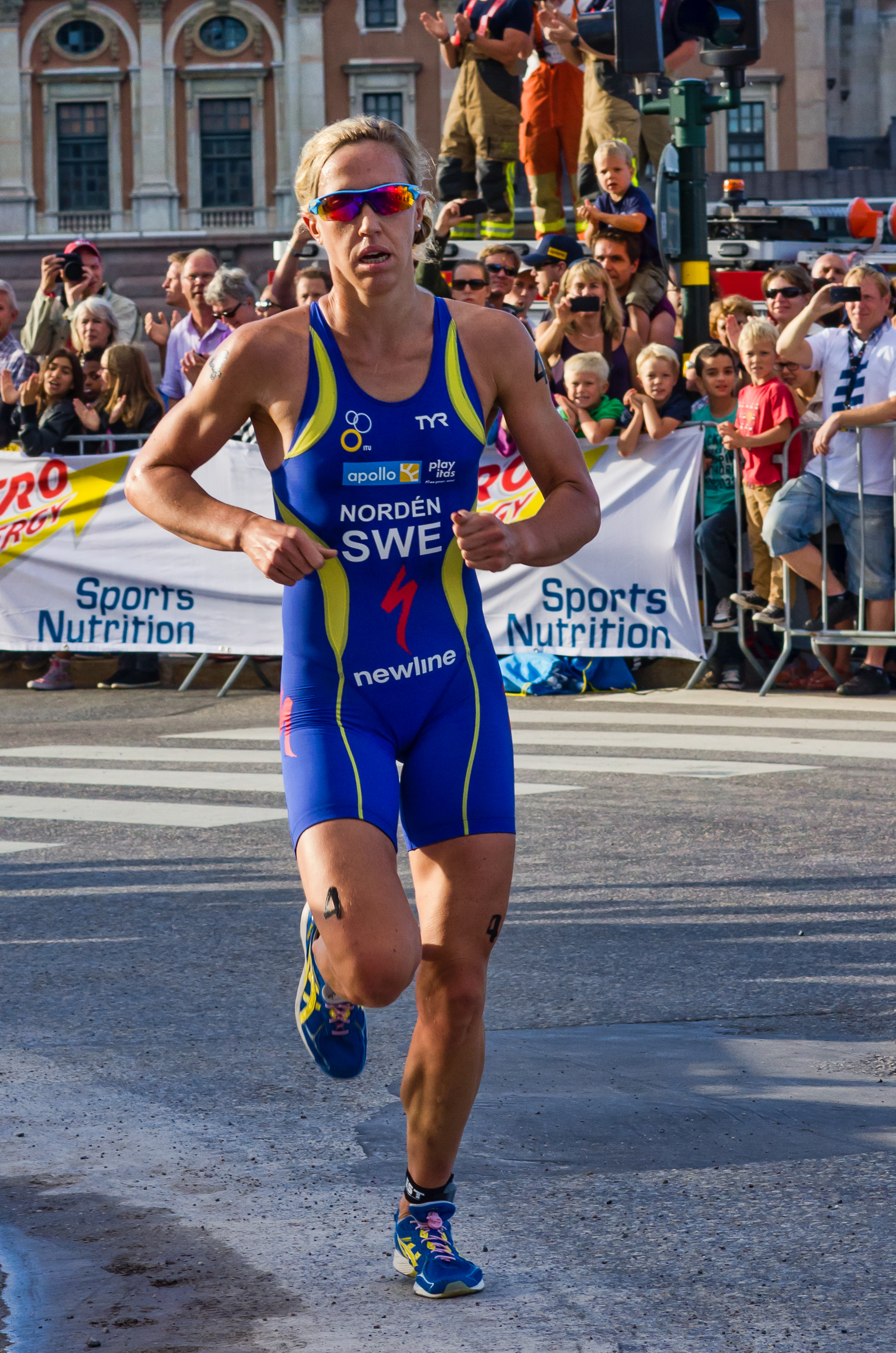
Lisa Nordén on her way to victory in Stockholm World Championship event, 25 August 2012

Awards
Preceded by Therese Alshammar	Svenska Dagbladet Gold Medal; 2012	Succeeded by Johan Olsson
