= Lucy Hall (triathlete) =

English triathlete

Lucy Buckingham (née Hall)
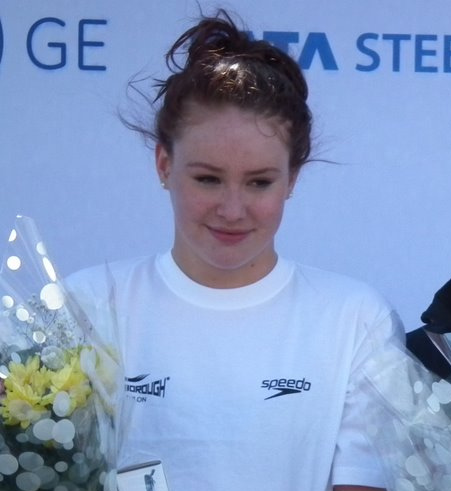
- Lucy Hall at the 2011 Strathclyde Park Triathlon

Personal information
- Nickname: La Sirène (The Mermaid)
- Nationality: English
- Born: 21 February 1992 (age 34) Leicester, Leicestershire, England
- Height: 1.78 m (5 ft 10 in)
- Weight: 60 kg (132 lb)
- Website: lucy-hall.co.uk

Sport
- Country: Great Britain
- Sport: Triathlon
- College team: Loughborough
- Club: Brive Limousin
- Turned pro: 2011
- Coached by: Mark Pearce

Lucy Buckingham, born and known professionally as Lucy Hall (born 21 February 1992 in Leicester) is an English triathlete.

As of 2012, Hall is 1.78 metres (5 ft 10 in) tall and weighs 60 kilograms (130 lb). She is coached by Mark Pearce. She is studying towards a foundation degree in Sports Science and Management at Loughborough College. Hall has been nicknamed "la Sirène" or "The Mermaid" in France, where she races in the French Grand Prix.

She was chosen to compete for Great Britain in the European Youth Triathlon Championships in Italy, Finland and Spain where she won a gold medal in 2006 and a bronze medal in 2007 as part of relay teams. At the 2009 Youth Olympic Festival in Sydney she won the bronze medal. At the 2011 Junior World Championships in Beijing, China, Hall's race was ended when a stray dog ran in front of her bike causing her to crash. Hall made her senior debut in the 2011 ITU World Championship Series.

Hall was selected to represent Great Britain at the 2012 Summer Olympics in the women's triathlon alongside Helen Jenkins and Vicky Holland. Hall, who was ranked 148th in the world points list at the time of her selection, was chosen ahead five British athletes ranked in the world's top 100 because of her ability to perform a domestique role for Jenkins. In preparation for the triathlon, Hall trained in Bridgend for 10 days with Jenkins. After leading the pack in the swimming leg and much of the cycling, Hall placed 33rd with a final time of 2:04:38 – she had the best swim relay of all.

In 2015, she was part of ECS Triathlon team.

In July 2015, Lucy won the European U23 Triathlon Championship

In September 2023, Lucy won IRONMAN 70.3 Knokke-Heist, Belgium by 8 seconds over Lizzie Rayner Of the United Kingdom.
