= Mateja Šimic =

Slovenian triathlete

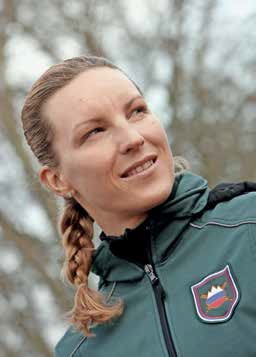

Personal information
- Born: 11 March 1980 (age 46) Ljubljana, Slovenia

Sport
- Sport: Triathlon

Mateja Šimic (born 11 March 1980) is a Slovenian triathlete. She competed in the Women's event at the 2012 Summer Olympics.
