= Marc Jenkins =

Welsh triathlete

Marc Rhys Jenkins (born 21 July 1976) is a British/Welsh triathlete from Bridgend.

Jenkins Won multiple British Triathlon titles and competed for Great Britain in European and World Championships, finishing Top 15 in the World. He also podiumed in World Ranking Events including a win in Swansea (Jenkins trained out of The National Pool Wales, Swansea) and Podiumed at Triathlon World Cup events.

Jenkins competed at the second Olympic triathlon at the 2004 Summer Olympics. He was the last man to finish, because of a collision during the cycling leg that left his bicycle unusable. Rather than quit, he ran 2km with the bike on his shoulders to be able to finish the race ending forty-fifth of the fifty who started. His time was 2:05:33.60.

Jenkins was diagnosed with multiple DVT's and Pulmonary embolisms following Competition in Hawaii and Mexico in 2005.

Jenkins married fellow Olympic triathlete, Helen Tucker, in October 2008. Jenkins coached Helen to 3 World Titles and 3 Olympic games in Beijing 2008, London 2012 and Rio 2016.

Jenkins was the Conservative prospective parliamentary candidate for Gower in the 2024 general election. He came second in the seat, winning 8,913 votes, 11,567 behind the winning Labour candidate.
