= Triathlon at the 2012 Summer Olympics – Qualification =

After a few places allocated to championships, the bulk of places are awarded on the basis of world rankings as at 31 May 2012. After 8 NOCs have qualified 3 athletes for an event, other NOCs are limited to 2 athletes for that event.

== Qualification timeline ==
Event	Date	Venue
World Qualification Event	August 6–7, 2011	(United Kingdom) London
2011 ASTC Asian Triathlon Championships	September 24–25, 2011	(Chinese Taipei) Mehua Lake Yilan County
2011 Pan American Games	October 23, 2011	(Mexico) Puerto Vallarta
2012 ETU European Triathlon Championships	April 17–22, 2012	(Israel) Eilat
2012 OTU Oceania Triathlon Championships	March 10, 2012	(Australia) Devonport
African Continental Qualification Event	March 31, 2012	(Mauritius) Le Morne
Cutoff for World Rankings	May 31, 2012	

== Qualification progress ==
Event	Men	Women
African Qualification Event	South Africa	South Africa
Asian Championships	Japan	Japan
Pan American Games	Brazil	United States
European Championships	Spain	Switzerland
Oceania Championships	Australia	Australia
World Qualification Event	Great Britain; Russia; Great Britain	Great Britain; United States; Germany
ITU Olympic Qualification List; ITU World Championship Series Rankings; ITU Points List	Argentina; Australia; Australia; Austria; Belgium; Bermuda; Brazil; Canada; Canada; Canada; Colombia; Costa Rica; Czech Republic; Czech Republic; France; France; France; Germany; Germany; Germany; Great Britain; Ireland; Italy; Italy; Japan; Mexico; New Zealand; New Zealand; New Zealand; Poland; Portugal; Portugal; Russia; Russia; South Korea; Spain; Spain; Switzerland; Switzerland; Ukraine; United States; United States	Australia; Australia; Belgium; Bermuda; Brazil; Canada; Canada; Chile; Czech Republic; Czech Republic; Denmark; Denmark; France; France; France; Germany; Germany; Great Britain; Great Britain; Hungary; Ireland; Italy; Japan; Japan; Mexico; Netherlands; Netherlands; New Zealand; New Zealand; New Zealand; Poland; Poland; Russia; Russia; Slovenia; South Africa; Spain; Spain; Spain; Sweden; Switzerland; Ukraine; United States
ITU Points List; Best non-qualified NOC for each continent	China (Asia); Slovakia (Europe); Zimbabwe (Africa)	China (Asia); Ecuador (America); Mauritius (Africa)
Tripartite Commission	Monaco	-----
Rellocation of Quotas	Chile	Austria
Total	55	55

== Qualification summary ==
NOC	Men	Women	Total
Argentina	1		1
Australia	3	3	6
Austria	1	1	2
Belgium	1	1	2
Bermuda	1	1	2
Brazil	2	1	3
Canada	3	2	5
Chile	1	1	2
China	1	1	2
Colombia	1		1
Costa Rica	1		1
Czech Republic	2	2	4
Denmark		2	2
Ecuador		1	1
France	3	3	6
Germany	3	3	6
Great Britain	3	3	6
Hungary		1	1
Ireland	1	1	2
Italy	2	1	3
Japan	2	3	5
Mauritius		1	1
Mexico	1	1	2
Monaco	1		1
Netherlands		2	2
New Zealand	3	3	6
Poland	1	2	3
Portugal	2		2
Russia	3	2	5
Slovakia	1		1
Slovenia		1	1
South Africa	1	2	3
South Korea	1		1
Spain	3	3	6
Sweden		1	1
Switzerland	2	2	4
Ukraine	1	1	2
United States	2	3	5
Zimbabwe	1		1
Total: 39 NOCs	55	55	110
