= Maaike Caelers =

Dutch triathlete (born 1990)

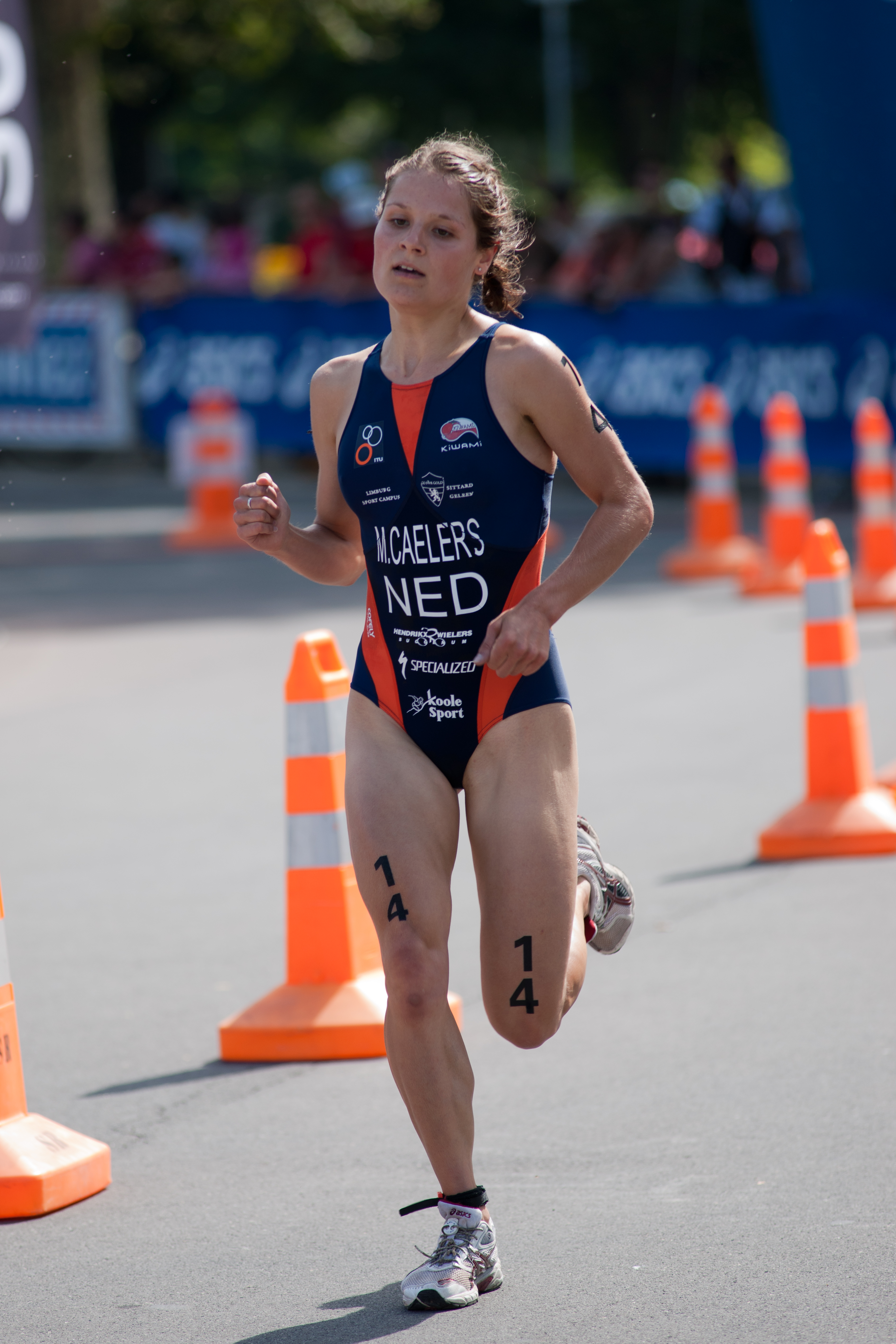

Personal information
- Born: 2 September 1990 (age 35) Weert, Netherlands

Sport
- Sport: Triathlon

Maaike Caelers (born 2 September 1990) is a Dutch triathlete. She competed in the Women's event at the 2012 Summer Olympics. In 2013, she was part of ECS Triathlon club. The table shows the most significant results (podium) achieved on the national and international triathlon circuit since 2010.
