= Line Jensen (triathlete) =

Danish triathlete

Personal information
- Nationality: Danish
- Born: 14 January 1981 (age 45) Silkeborg, Denmark
- Height: 1.78 m (5 ft 10 in)
- Weight: 61 kg (134 lb)
- Website: jensentri.com/line/

Sport
- Country: Denmark
- Sport: Triathlon
- Turned pro: 2009

Line Jensen (born 14 January 1981) is a Danish triathlete. She competed in the Women's event at the 2012 Summer Olympics.
