= Kathy Tremblay =

Canadian triathlete

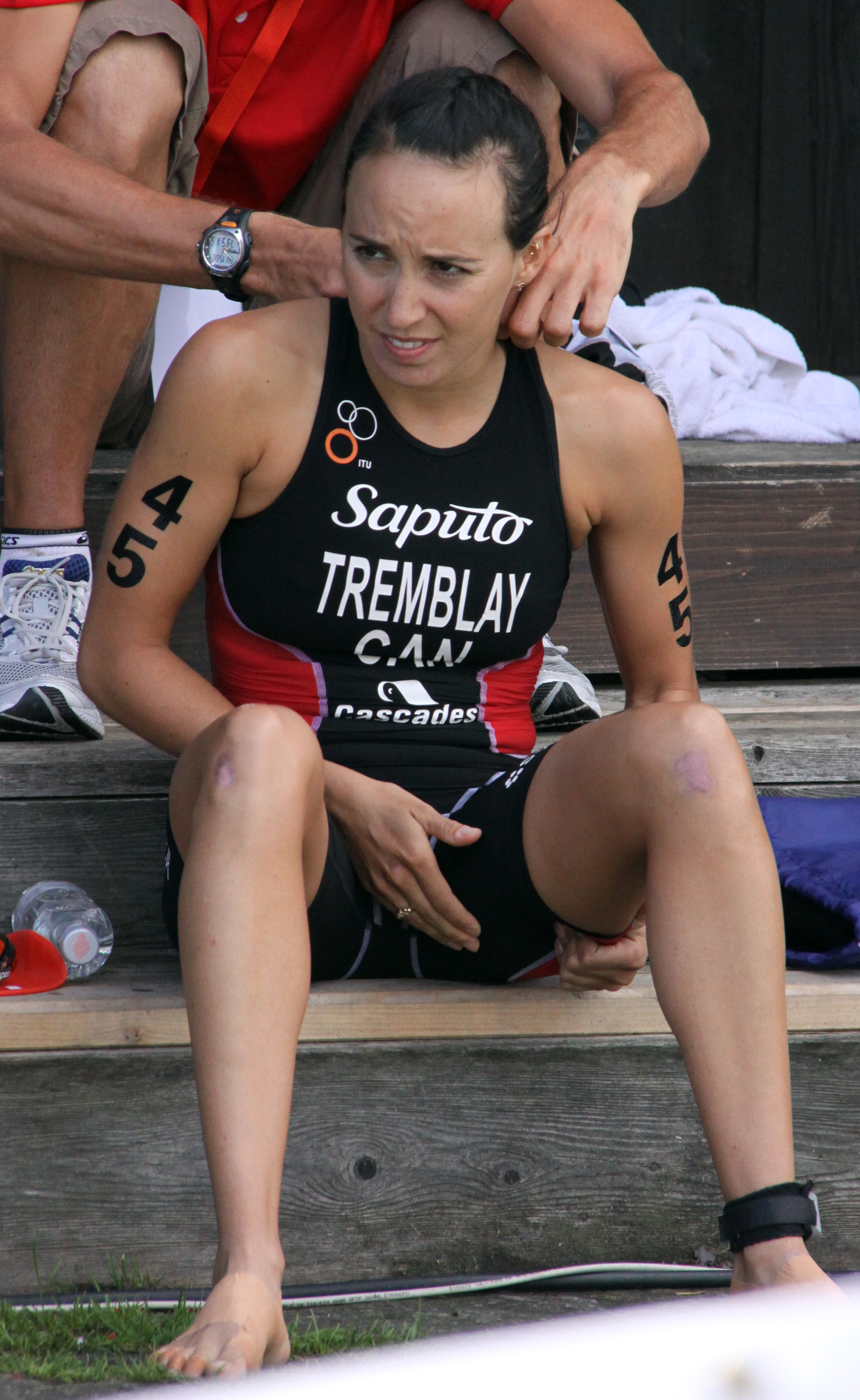
- Tremblay a few minutes before the start of the World Championship Series triathlon in Kitzbuhel, 2010

Personal information
- Born: June 16, 1982 (age 44) Sainte-Foy, Quebec, Canada
- Height: 5 ft 2 in (1.57 m)
- Weight: 105 lb (48 kg)

Sport
- Country: Canada

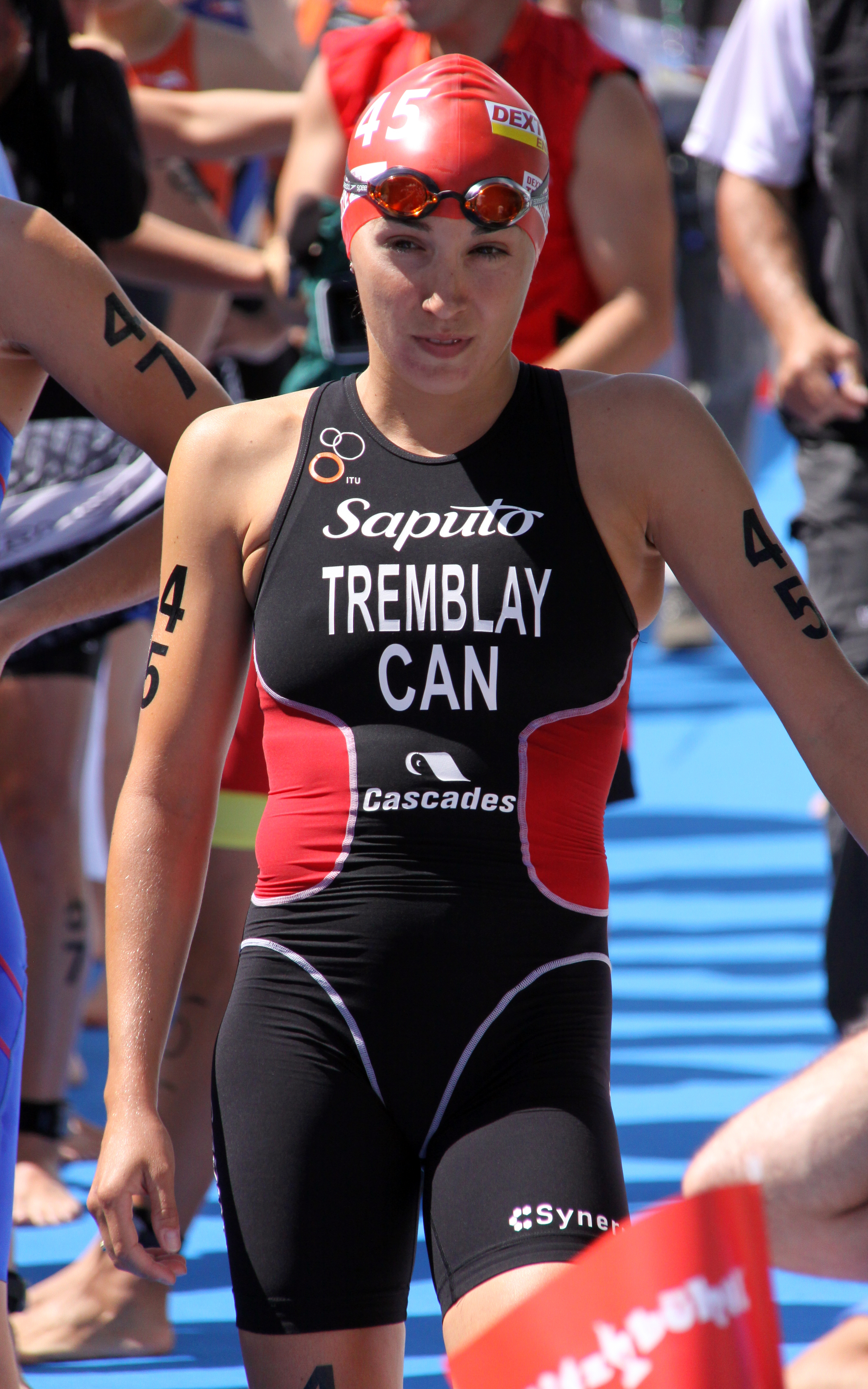
Kathy Tremblay waiting for the start at Kitzbuhel, 2010.

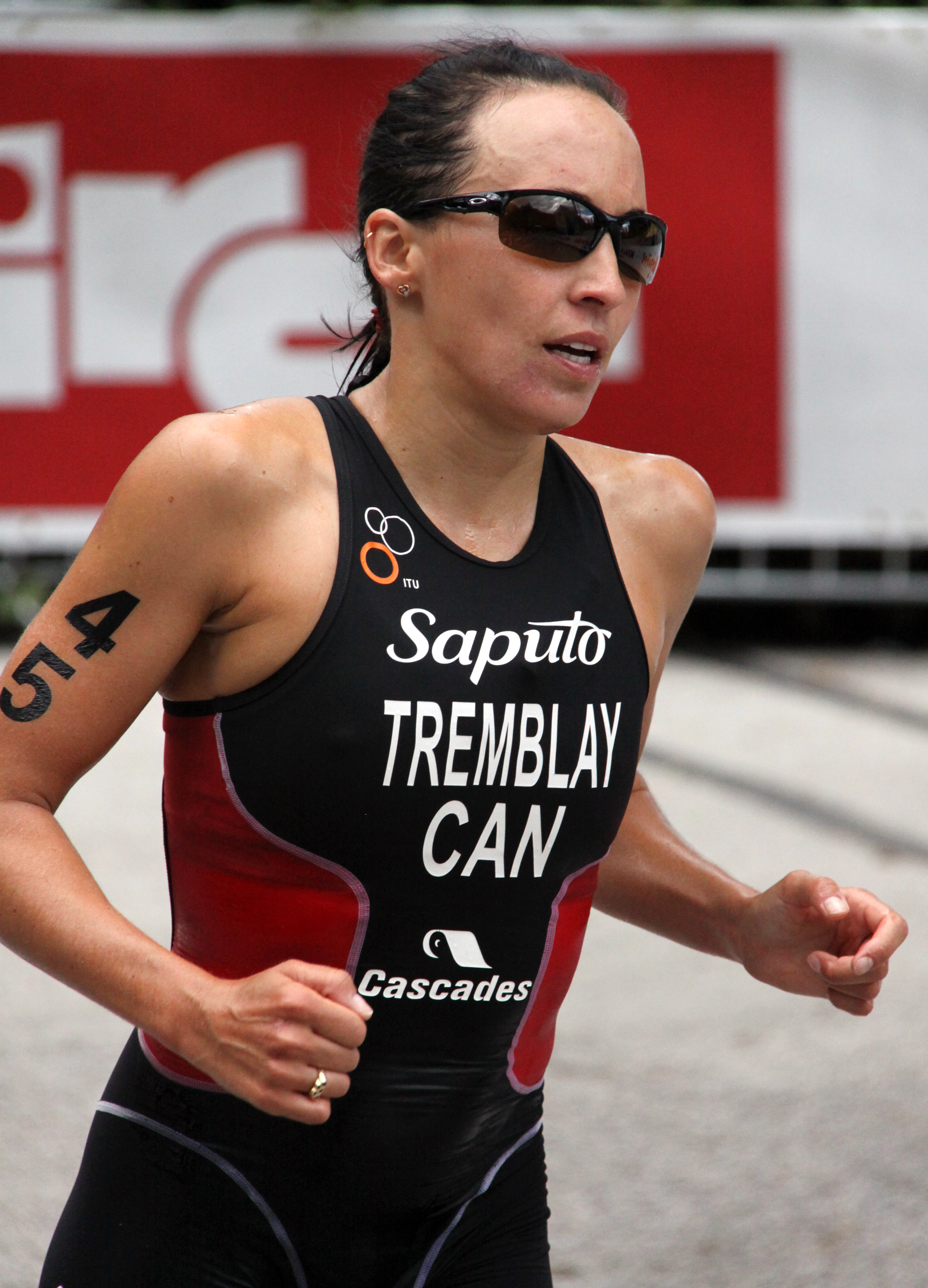
Kathy Tremblay still in the race at Kitzbuhel, 2010.

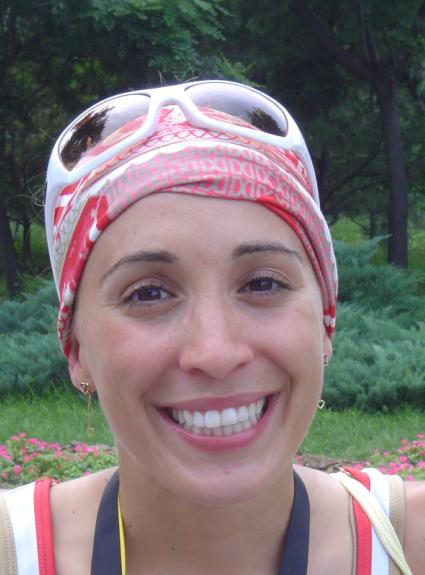
Tremblay at the 2008 Summer Olympics.

Kathy Tremblay (born 16 June 1982) is a professional Canadian triathlete and member of the National Team.

Tremblay placed 31st in the 2008 Summer Olympics. Tremblay holds a degree in PR and Management (Relations industrielles, relations publiques et création d'entreprises). She lives in Montreal and is coached by her boyfriend David-James Taché.

Along with fellow Canadian triathlete Paula Findlay, Tremblay qualified for the triathlon event at the 2012 Summer Olympics but did not finish the race due to a cycling crash.

== ITU Competitions ==
In the eleven years from 2000 to 2010, Tremblay took part in 52 ITU competitions and achieved 20 top ten positions.

The list is based upon the official ITU rankings and the Athlete's Profile Page. Unless indicated otherwise, the following events are triathlons (Olympic Distance) and belong to the Elite category.

Date	Competition	Place	Rank
2000-04-30	World Championships (Junior)	Perth	17
2001-07-07	World Cup	Toronto	20
2001-07-22	World Championship (Junior)	Edmonton	10
2002-04-27	World Cup	St. Petersburg	25
2002-07-21	World Cup	Corner Brook	19
2002-09-21	World Cup	Nice	32
2002-11-09	World Championships (U23)	Cancun	15
2004-05-09	World Championships (U23)	Madeira	9
2005-07-10	Pan American Cup	New York	3
2005-07-23	World Cup	Edmonton	15
2005-09-10	World Championships (U23)	Gamagori	5
2005-11-13	World Cup	New Plymouth	27
2006-05-07	World Cup	Mazatlan	3
2006-06-04	Pan American Championships	Brasília	1
2006-07-02	Pan American Cup	Brampton	2
2006-07-09	BG World Cup	Edmonton	11
2006-08-05	Pan American Cup	Bridgeport	1
2006-09-02	World Championships	Lausanne	25
2006-09-09	BG World Cup	Hamburg	32
2006-09-24	BG World Cup	Beijing	9
2006-11-05	BG World Cup	Cancun	48
2007-04-15	BG World Cup	Ishigaki	20
2007-05-06	BG World Cup	Lisbon	DNF
2007-06-17	BG World Cup	Des Moines	16
2007-06-24	BG World Cup	Edmonton	14
2007-07-15	PATCO Pan American Championships	Rio de Janeiro	4
2007-08-05	Pan American Cup	Drummondville	1
2007-08-11	BG World Cup	Tiszaújváros	23
2007-08-30	BG World Championships	Hamburg	27
2007-09-15	BG World Cup	Beijing	DNF
2007-11-04	BG World Cup	Cancun	16
2007-12-01	BG World Cup	Eilat	8
2008-04-06	BG World Cup	New Plymouth	24
2008-04-13	BG World Cup	Ishigaki	5
2008-05-04	BG World Cup	Richards Bay	4
2008-06-05	BG World Championships	Vancouver	21
2008-07-12	Pan American Cup	Musselman	2
2008-08-18	Olympic Games	Beijing	31
2009-04-26	World Cup	Ishigaki	2
2009-05-02	Dextro Energy World Championship Series	Tongyeong	4
2009-06-21	Dextro Energy World Championship Series	Washington DC	22
2009-06-27	Elite Cup	Hy-Vee	27
2009-07-11	Dextro Energy World Championship Series	Kitzbuhel	4
2009-07-25	Dextro Energy World Championship Series	Hamburg	10
2009-08-23	Pan American Cup	Kelowna	2
2009-09-09	Dextro Energy World Championship Series, Grand Final	Gold Coast	30
2010-03-27	World Cup	Mooloolaba	19
2010-04-11	Dextro Energy World Championship Series	Sydney	30
2010-06-05	Dextro Energy World Championship Series	Madrid	DNF
2010-06-12	Elite Cup	Hy-Vee	22
2010-07-24	Dextro Energy World Championship Series	London	38
2010-08-14	Dextro Energy World Championship Series	Kitzbuhel	DNF
