= Erin Densham =

Australian triathlete

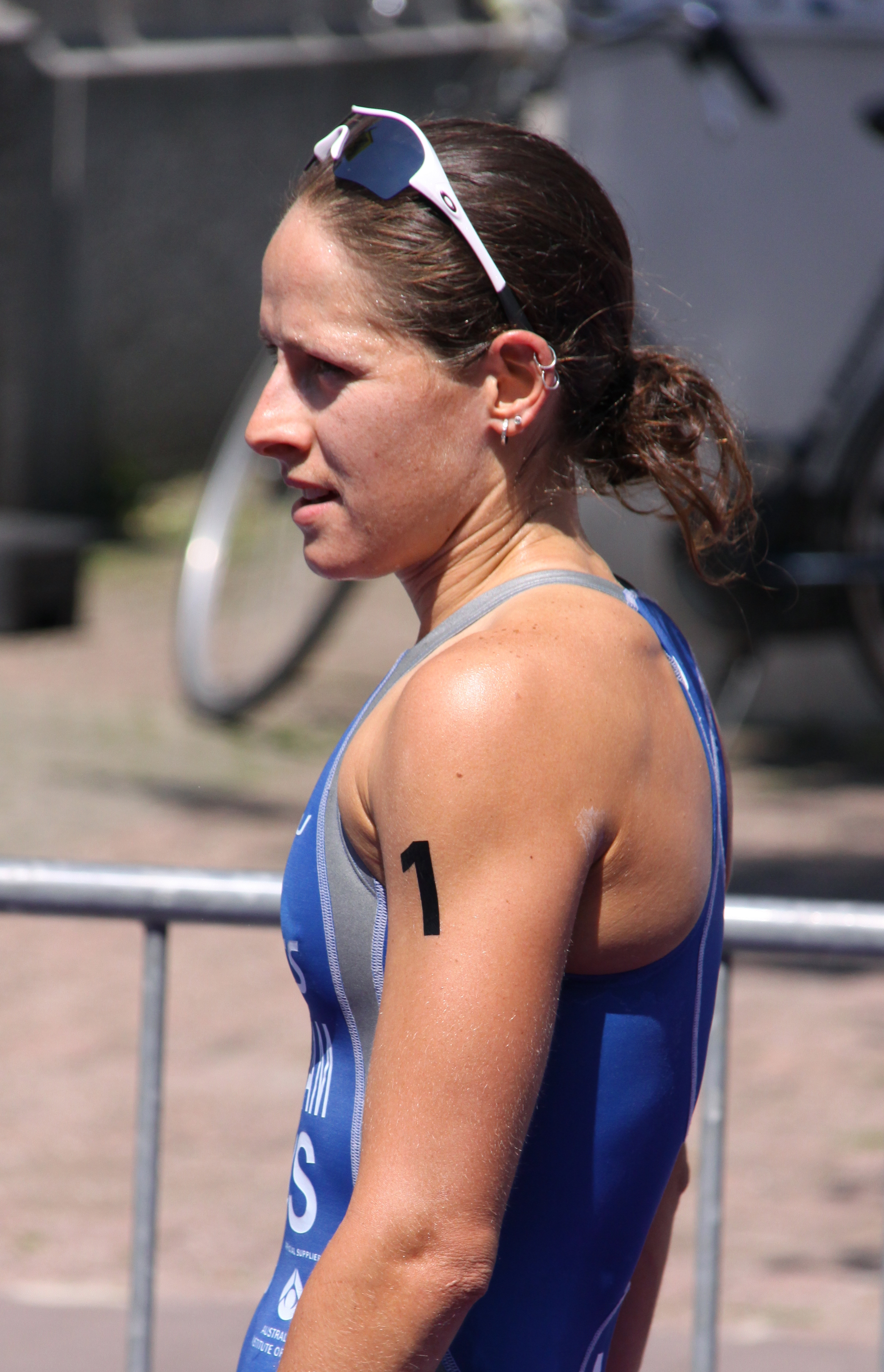
- Densham, immediately after her race in Brasschaat, 2010

Personal information
- Nickname: Delly Buttons
- Born: 3 May 1985 (age 41) Camden, New South Wales, Australia
- Height: 164 cm (5 ft 5 in)
- Weight: 52 kg (115 lb)

Sport
- Country: Australia
- Coached by: Shaun Stephens
Medal record
Women's triathlon
Representing Australia
Olympic Games
Bronze medal – third place	2012 London	Individual

Erin Densham (born 3 May 1985 in Camden, New South Wales, Australia) is an Australian professional triathlete and bronze medallist in the 2012 Olympics.

== Early life ==
Erin Densham attended the Ruse Public School and the John Therry Catholic High School. She holds a degree in Fitness (Certificate III) and lives in St Kilda, Victoria, Australia.

== Career ==
In 2008, Densham competed in the 2008 Beijing Olympics and came 22nd. In 2009, Densham was seriously hampered by heart problems and glandular fever. In Des Moines (Hy-Vee) Densham had to be dragged from the water.

In 2010, Densham is also one of the many international elite guest stars representing French clubs at the prestigious French Club Championship Series Lyonnaise des Eaux. At the opening circuit in Dunkirk on 23 May 2010, for instance, Densham placed 2nd and thus was the best triathlete of Poissy Tri, which thanks to her won the Dunkirk club ranking.

== ITU competitions ==
In the seven years from 2004 to 2010, Densham took part in 44 ITU competitions and achieved 22 top ten positions, amongst which were eight gold medals.

== Gallery ==
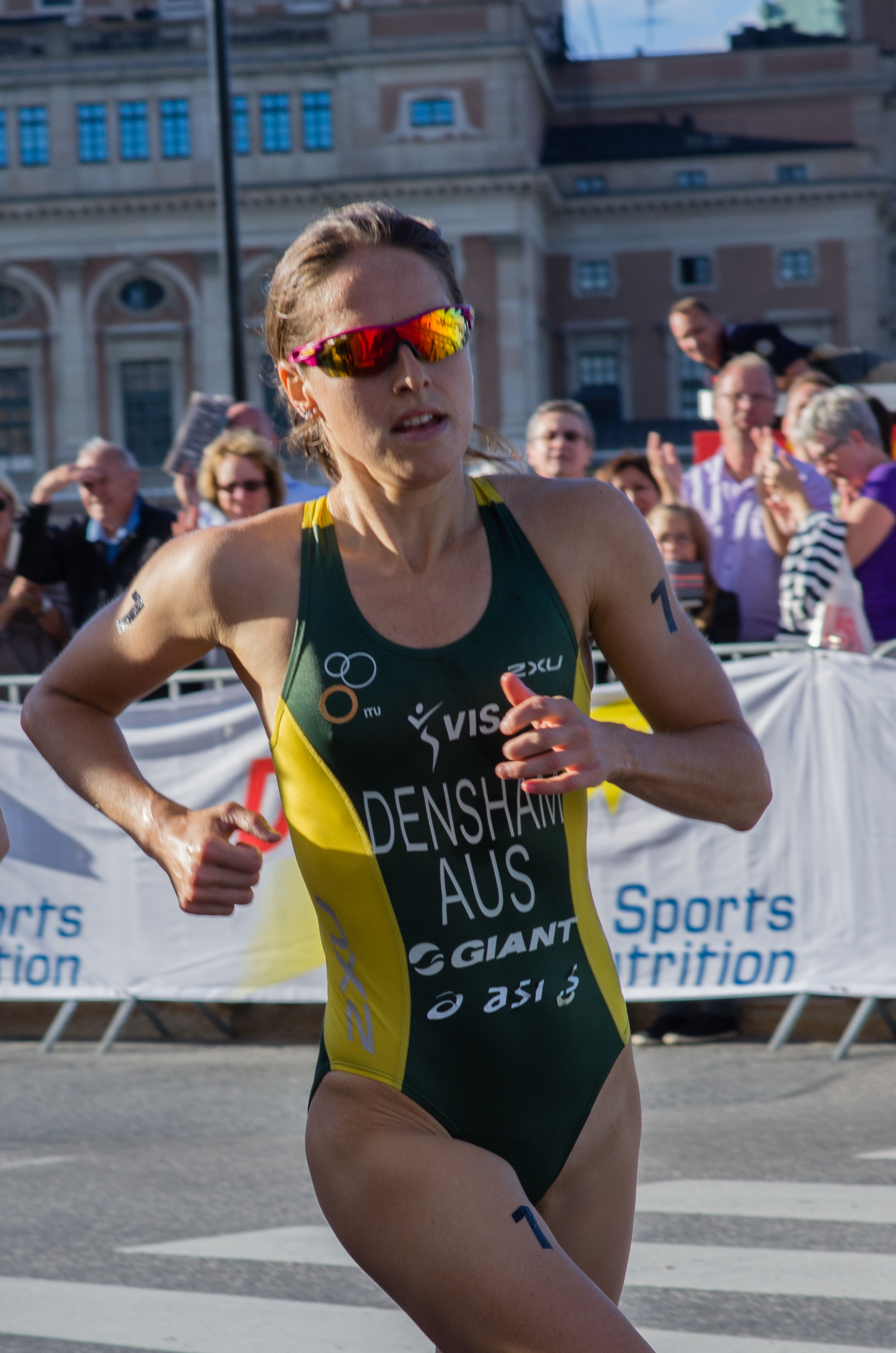
Densham in the World Championships in Stockholm, 2012

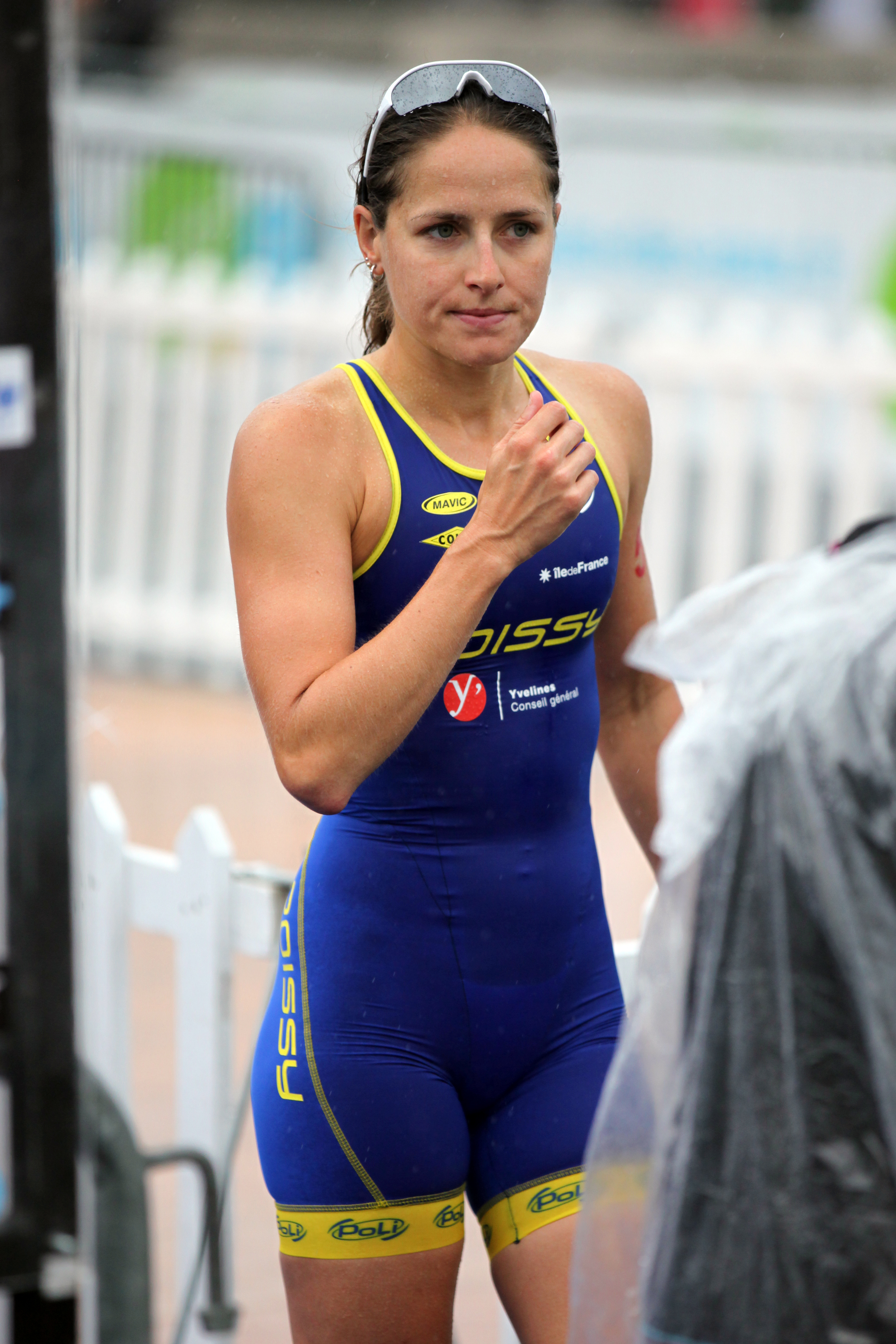
Densham at the Grand Prix triathlon in Paris, 2011.

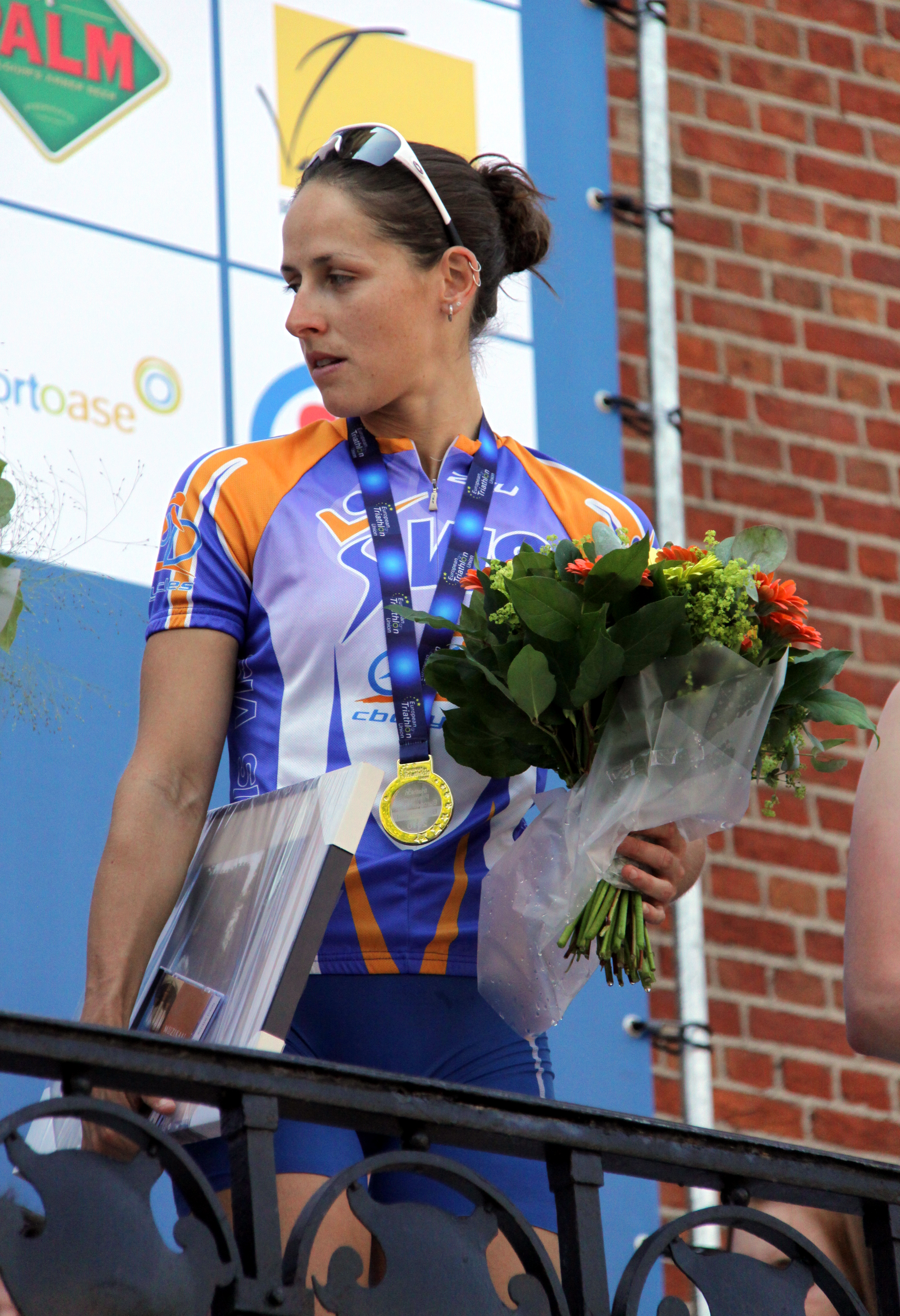
Densham with the gold medal at the Premium European Cup triathlon in Brasschaat, 2010.

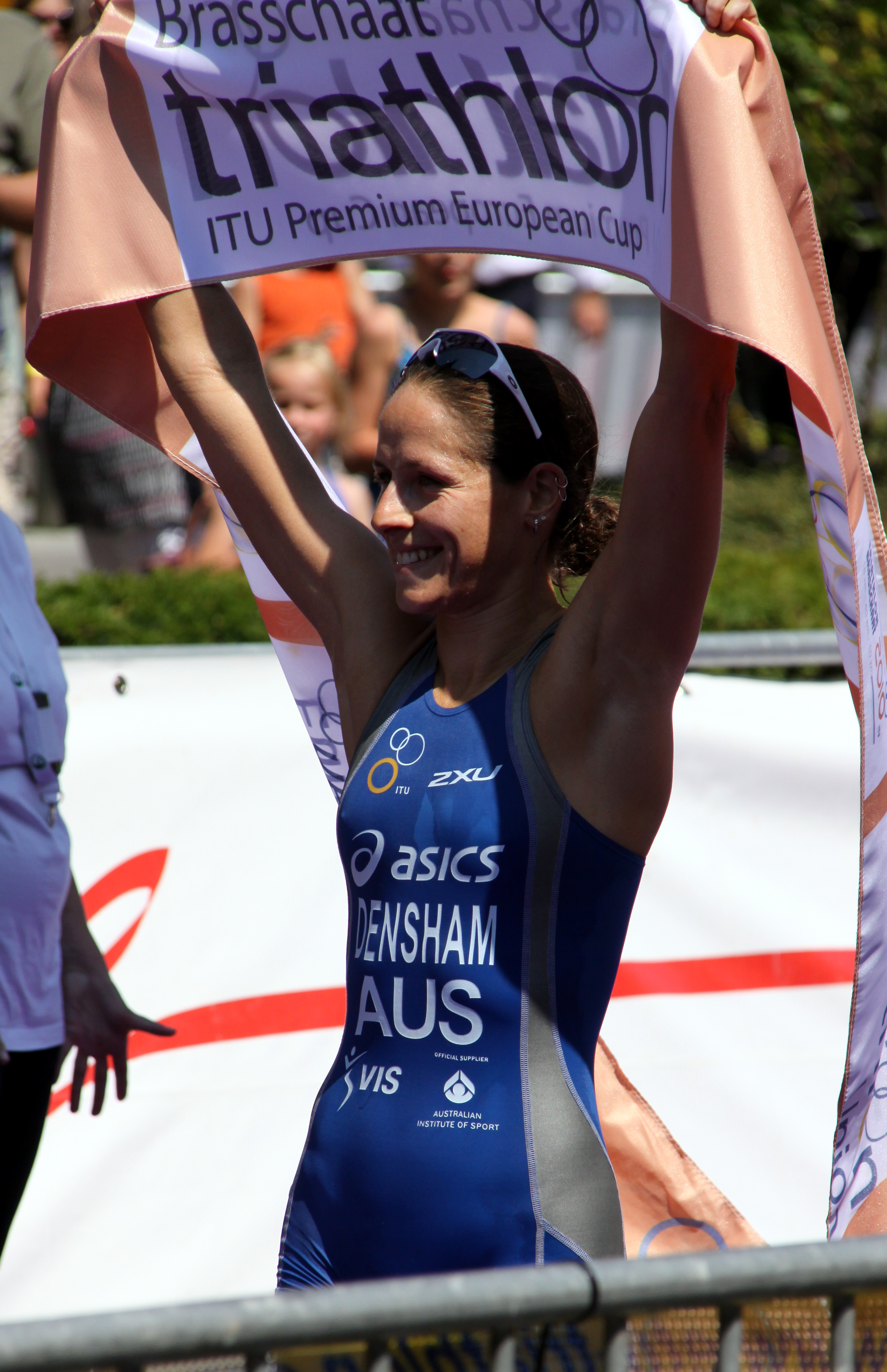
Densham crossing the finish line first, Brasschaat 2010.
