= Ainhoa Murúa =

Basque triathlete (born 1978)

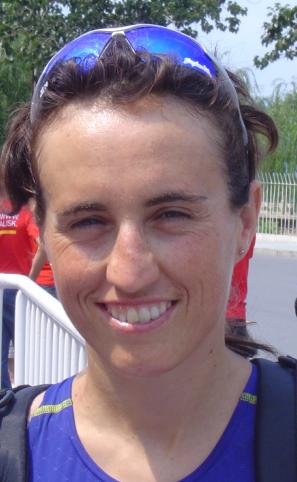
- Murúa at the 2008 Summer Olympics

Personal information
- Full name: Ainhoa Murúa Zubizarreta
- Born: 18 July 1978 (age 48) Zarautz, Guipúzcoa, Spain
- Height: 160 cm (5 ft 3 in)
- Weight: 46 kg (101 lb)

Ainhoa Murúa Zubizarreta (Note: In this Spanish name, the first or paternal surname is Murúa and the second or maternal family name is Zubizarreta.) (born 18 July 1978) is a Basque triathlete who competed for Spain.

Murúa participated in the second Olympic triathlon at the 2004 Summer Olympics. She took twenty-fourth place with a total time of 2:09:27.91. At the 2008 Beijing Olympics, she finished in 28th place, with a time of 2:04:48:07. At the 2012 Summer Olympics she came 7th with a time of 2:00:56.00.

== Biography ==
Having won numerous Triathlon in her native Basque Country (greater region), Ainhoa Murúa took part in her first international triathlon in 2001. Winning one World Cup and several European titles throughout her career, Murúa took part in three Triathlon at the Summer Olympics, her best result being seventh place at the Triathlon at the 2012 Summer Olympics, and finished Europe Triathlon Championships the same year.
