= Helen Jenkins =

Welsh triathlete

Helen Jenkins MBE
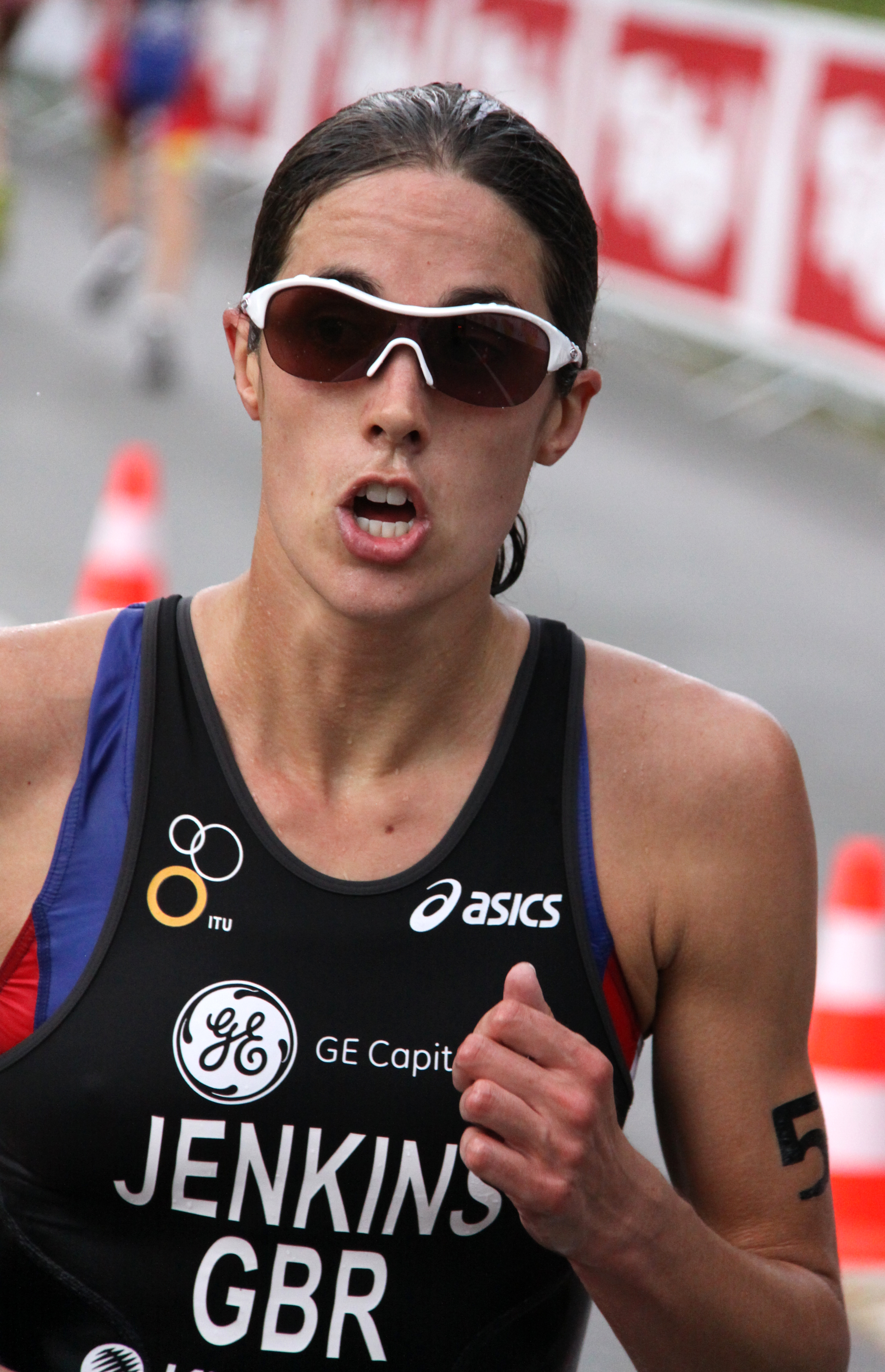
- Jenkins at the 2010 World Championships Series event in Kitzbühel

Personal information
- Born: Helen Rebecca Tucker; 8 March 1984 (age 42) Elgin, Moray, Scotland
- Height: 1.68 m (5 ft 6 in)
- Weight: 55 kg (121 lb)

Sport
- Country: Wales
- Club: Giant Racing
- Team: Corus Triathlon
- Coached by: Rick Velati; Marc Jenkins
Medal record
Women's Triathlon
Representing Great Britain
ITU World Championships
Gold medal – first place	2008 Vancouver	Elite
Gold medal – first place	2011 Beijing	Elite
Gold medal – first place	2011 Lausanne	Team

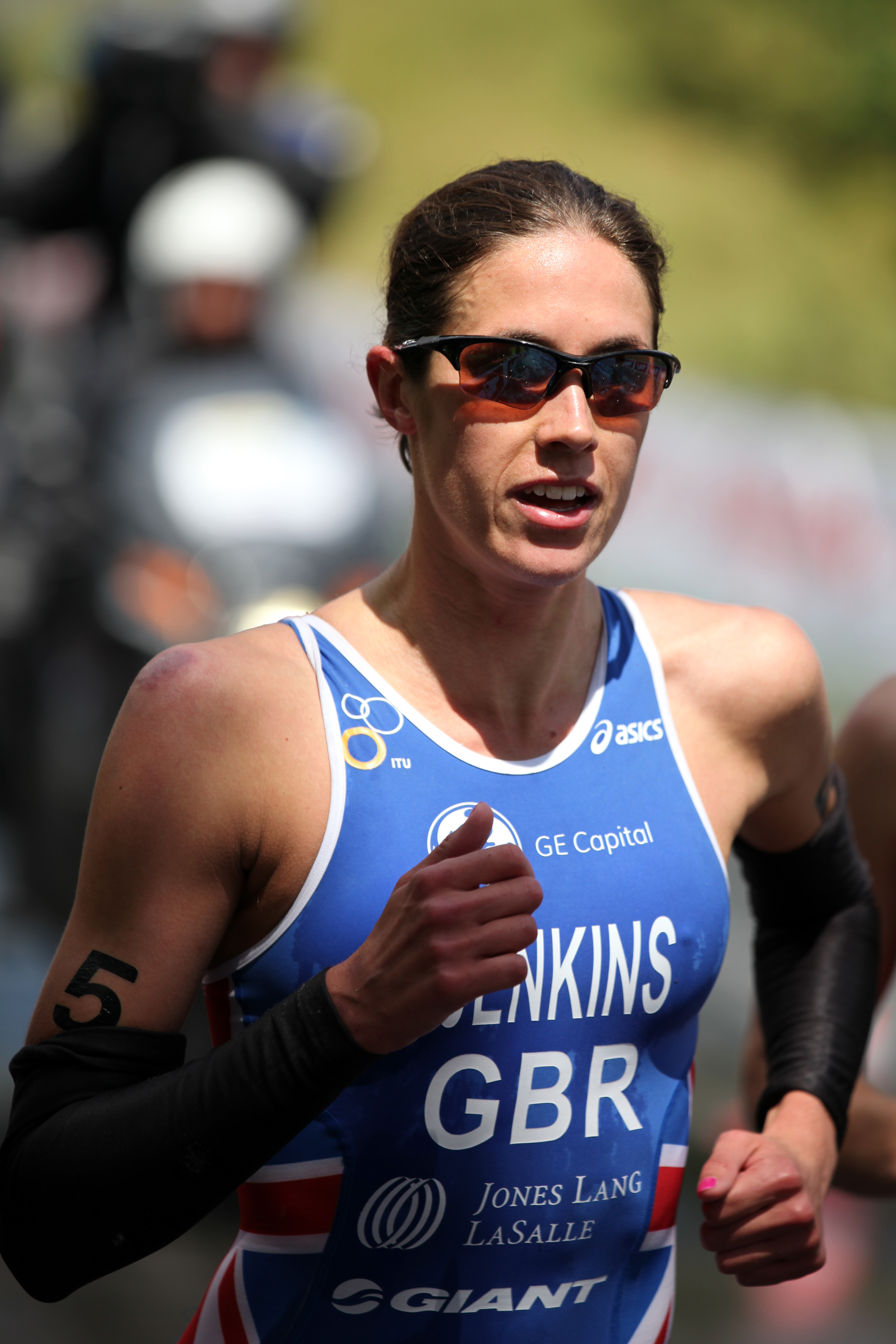
Helen Jenkins, silver medalist at the World Championship triathlon in Kitzbuhel, 2011.

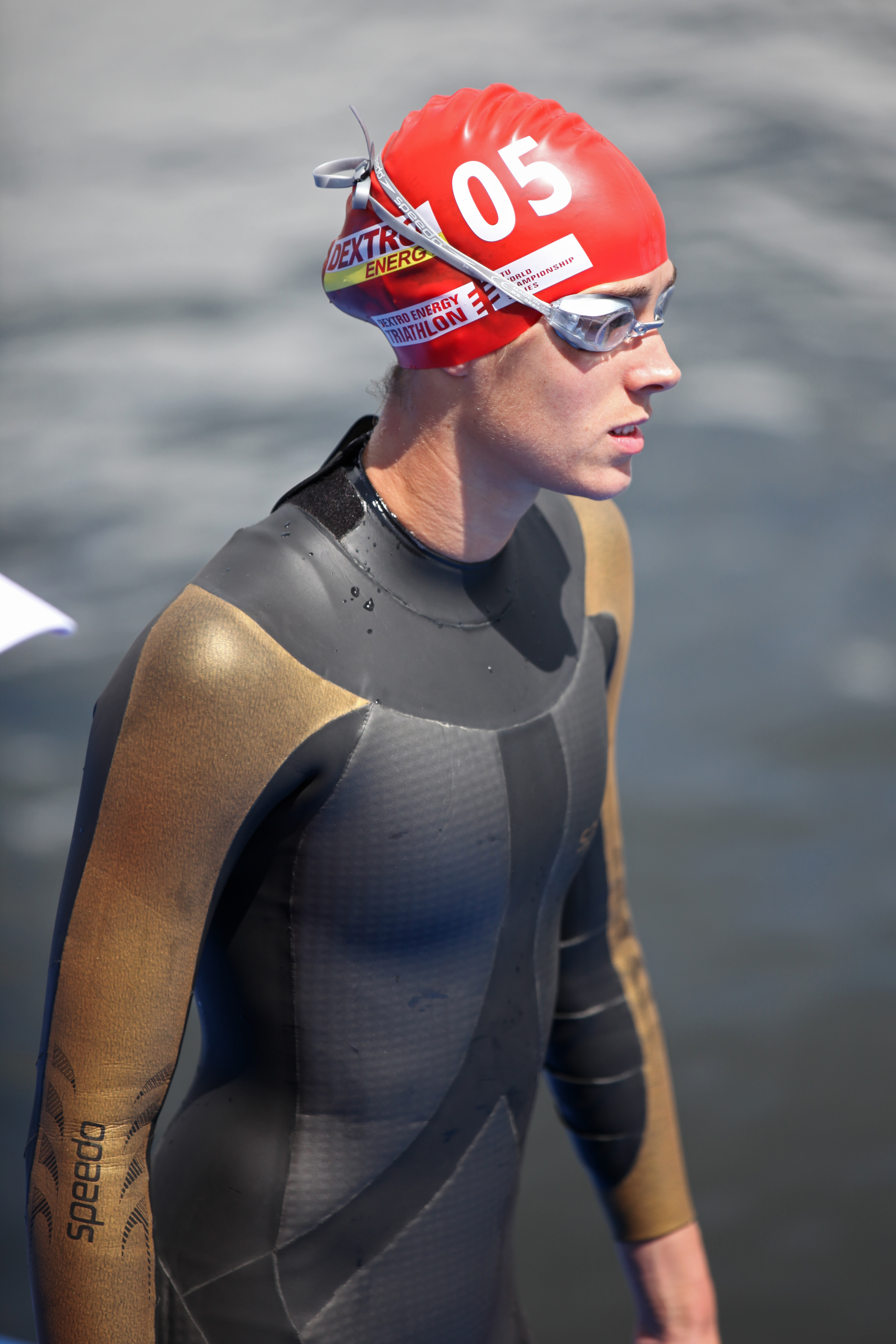
Helen Jenkins a few seconds before the start in Kitzbuhel, 2011.

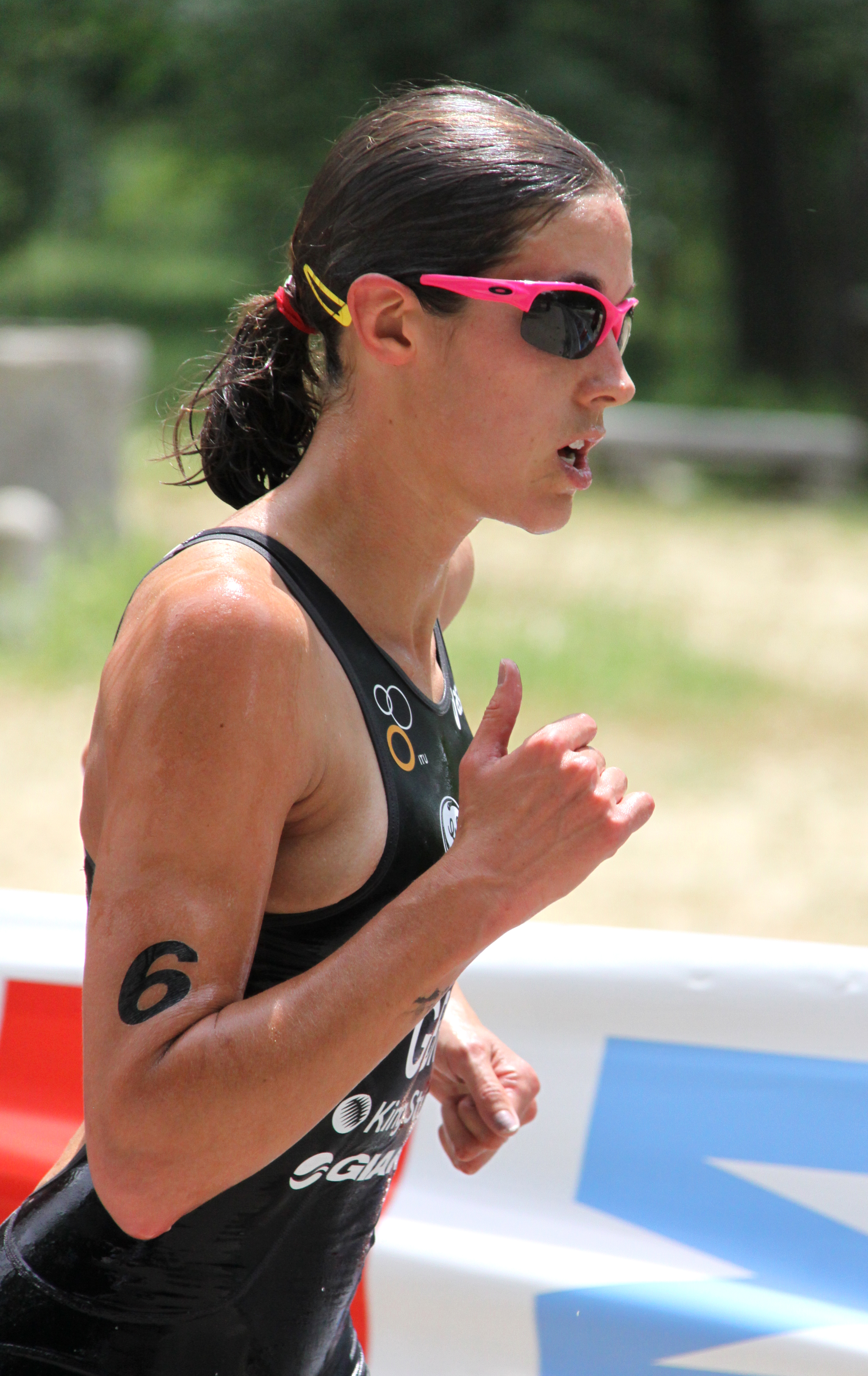
Helen Jenkins on her way to the bronze medal at the World Championship Series Triathlon in Madrid, 2010.

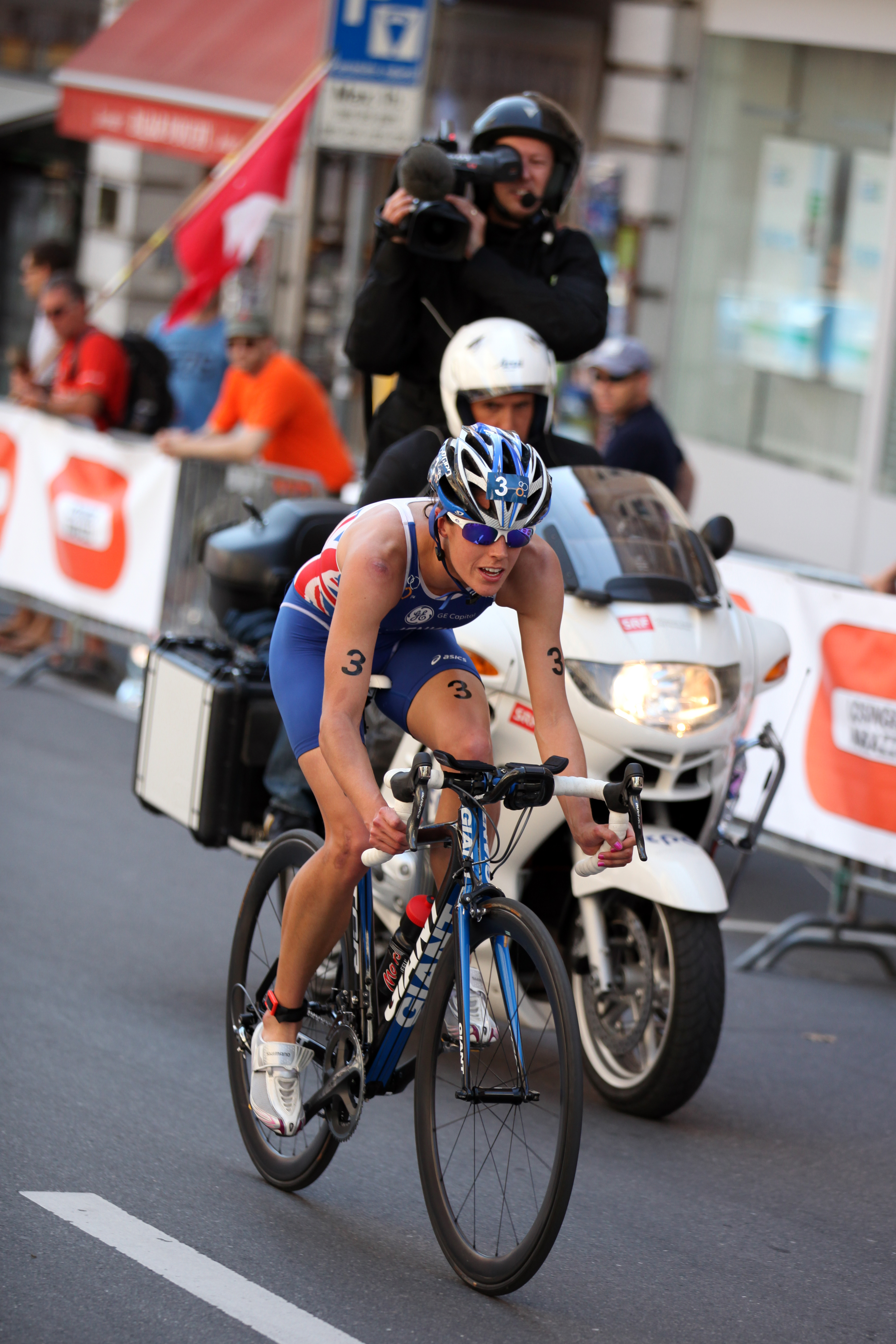
Helen Jenkins in Lausanne, 2011.

Helen Rebecca Jenkins, née Tucker MBE (born 8 March 1984) is a two-time triathlon world champion (2008 & 2011). She represented Team Great Britain at the Olympic Games (2008, 2012 & 2016) and World Championships (since 2009) and Wales at the Commonwealth Games.

== Career ==
Jenkins was the British Junior Champion of the year in 2003, the elite silver medalist of the year in 2005, and the Elite Champion of the year in 2006. Jenkins also participated in several prestigious non ITU events; in 2009, she won the London Triathlon, which she had already attended in the years 2003, 2004, and 2005, placing 7th, 5th, and 5th respectively.

In 2006, she suffered from an Achilles tendon injury, and though after a new start in 2007 the injury again affected her, in 2008 she won the World Championships in Vancouver and placed 21st at the Olympic Games in Beijing.

She again represented Great Britain at the 2012 Summer Olympics, finishing in 5th place.

She was appointed a Member of the Order of the British Empire (MBE) in the 2019 New Year Honours for services to Triathlon.

The birth of her second child and recovering from back surgery prevented her from competing for four years. Jenkins has now determined to return to professional racing and competing at the highest level. Jenkins’s first race back was Ironman 70.3 Dubai, where she finished 4th.

== Personal life ==
Jenkins was raised in Bridgend, Wales. She married her friend and coach Marc Jenkins at Disney World in Orlando on 30 October 2008.

== ITU Competitions ==
In the nine years from 2002 to 2010, Helen Jenkins took part in 42 ITU competitions and achieved 28 top ten positions, among which 14 medals.

The following list is based upon the official ITU rankings and the Athlete's Profile Page. Unless indicated otherwise, the following events are triathlons and belong to the Elite category.

Date	Competition	Place	Rank
2002-11-09	World Championships (Junior)	Cancun	9
2003-06-21	European Championships (Junior)	Carlsbad	13
2003-12-06	World Championships (Junior)	Queenstown	5
2004-04-18	European Championships	Valencia	22
2004-05-09	World Championships (U23)	Madeira	8
2005-07-17	European Championships (U23)	Sofia	3
2005-07-31	World Cup	Salford	3
2005-09-10	World Championships	Gamagori	32
2005-09-17	OSIM World Cup	Beijing	3
2006-02-19	Oceania Cup	Hobart	10
2006-03-18	Commonwealth Games	Melbourne	17
2006-03-26	World Cup	Mooloolaba	16
2006-04-23	European Cup	Estoril	2
2006-05-07	World Cup	Mazatlan	8
2006-06-04	BG World Cup	Madrid	5
2006-07-08	European Championships (U23)	Rijeka	4
2007-03-25	BG World Cup	Mooloolaba	20
2007-04-15	BG World Cup	Ishigaki	DNF
2008-01-06	Premium Pan American Cup	Viña del Mar	1
2008-01-13	Pan American Cup	La Paz	1
2008-03-30	BG World Cup	Mooloolaba	13
2008-04-06	BG World Cup	New Plymouth	13
2008-04-13	BG World Cup	Ishigaki	13
2008-05-25	BG World Cup	Madrid	2
2008-06-05	BG World Championships	Vancouver	1
2008-06-22	World Cup	Hy-Vee	3
2008-08-18	Olympic Games	Beijing	21
2009-05-02	Dextro Energy World Championship Series	Tongyeong	14
2009-05-31	Dextro Energy World Championship Series	Madrid	16
2009-06-21	Dextro Energy World Championship Series	Washington (D.C.)	5
2009-06-27	Elite Cup	Hy-Vee	10
2009-07-11	Dextro Energy World Championship Series	Kitzbühel	5
2009-08-15	Dextro Energy World Championship Series	London	3
2009-09-09	Dextro Energy World Championship Series, Grand Final	Gold Coast	3
2010-04-11	Dextro Energy World Championship Series	Sydney	15
2010-05-08	Dextro Energy World Championship Series	Seoul	9
2010-06-05	Dextro Energy World Championship Series	Madrid	3
2010-06-12	Elite Cup	Hy-Vee	3
2010-07-24	Dextro Energy World Championship Series	London	3
2010-08-15	Dextro Energy World Championship Series	Kitzbühel	4
2010-09-08	Dextro Energy World Championship Series, Grand Final	Budapest	7
2010-10-10	World Cup	Huatulco	4
2011-03-05	Pan American Cup (Sprint)	Clermont	1
2011-04-09	Dextro Energy World Championship Series	Sydney	33
2011-06-04	Dextro Energy World Championship Series	Madrid	2
2011-06-19	Dextro Energy World Championship Series	Kitzbuhel	2
2011-08-06	Dextro Energy World Championship Series	London	1
2011-06-19	Dextro Energy World Championship Series, Sprint World Championships	Lausanne	4
2011-09-09	Dextro Energy World Championship Grand Final	Beijing	2
2011-09-19	Dextro Energy World Championship Series	Yokohama	6
2011-09-24	ITU Triathlon Pan American Cup	Buffalo	2
2012-04-14	ITU World Triathlon Championship Series	Sydney	2
2012-05-10	ITU World Triathlon Series	San Diego	1
2012-08-04	Olympics	London	5

BG = the sponsor British Gas · DNF = did not finish · DNS = did not start
