= 2012 European Triathlon Championships =

2012 Europe Triathlon Championship
- Location: Israel, Eilat
- Date: 20-22 April 2012

The 2012 European Triathlon Championships was held in Eilat, Israel from 20 April to 22 April 2012.

== Medallists ==
Event	Gold		Silver		Bronze	
Elite
Men	Javier Gomez Noya (ESP)	1:55:48	Alexander Bryukhankov (RUS)	1:56:08	Ivan Vasiliev (RUS)	1:56:42
Women	Nicola Spirig (SUI)	2:07:11	Ainhoa Murua Zubizarreta (ESP)	2:07:20	Emmie Charayron (FRA)	2:07:56
Mixed Relay	Denmark	1:11:54	Germany	1:12:22	Hungary	1:22:59
Junior
Men	Matthias Steinwandter (ITA)	0:56:16	Delian Stateff (ITA)	0:56:19	Kristian Blummenfelt (NOR)	0:56:20
Women	Georgia Taylor-Brown (GBR)	1:02:47	Leonie Periault (FRA)	1:02:53	Sarah Wilm (GER)	1:03:02
Mixed Relay	Italy	1:12:19	France	1:12:24	Russia	1:12:28

== Results ==
=== Men's ===
Key

- # denotes the athlete's bib number for the event
- Swimming denotes the time it took the athlete to complete the swimming leg
- Cycling denotes the time it took the athlete to complete the cycling leg
- Running denotes the time it took the athlete to complete the running leg
- Difference denotes the time difference between the athlete and the event winner
- Lapped denotes that the athlete was lapped and removed from the course

Rank	#	Triathlete	Swimming	Cycling	Running	Total time	Difference
1st place, gold medalist(s)	9	Javier Gomez Noya (ESP)	17:55	1:05:58	30:20	1:55:48	—
2nd place, silver medalist(s)	8	Alexander Bryukhankov (RUS)	17:53	0:00:00	00:00	1:56:08	+00:20
3rd place, bronze medalist(s)	14	Ivan Vasiliev (RUS)	17:51	1:06:10	31:02	1:56:42	+00:54
4	6	Tony Moulai (FRA)	18:11	0:00:00	00:00	1:56:47	+00:59
5	3	Alessandro Fabian (ITA)	17:53	1:06:10	31:18	1:56:48	+01:00
6	2	Mario Mola (ESP)	18:48	0:00:00	31:18	1:56:52	+01:04
7	26	Franz Löschke (GER)	17:57	1:06:09	31:27	1:56:57	+01:09
8	1	Dmitry Polyanskiy (RUS)	17:49	1:05:17	31:36	1:57:06	+01:18
9	24	Aaron Harris (GBR)	18:15	1:06:05	31:38	1:57:09	+01:21
10	22	Aurélien Raphaël (FRA)	17:52	1:06:12	31:41	1:57:13	+01:25
11	4	Joao Pereira (POR)	18:00	1:05:41	31:49	1:57:21	+01:33
12	25	Fernando Alarza (ESP)	18:24	1:06:04	31:56	1:57:34	+01:46
13	28	Jan Čelůstka (CZE)	17:57	1:06:04	32:12	1:57:43	+01:55
14	16	Adam Bowden (GBR)	18:37	1:05:38	32:16	1:57:47	+01:59
15	35	Mark Buckingham (GBR)	19:04	1:06:04	32:27	1:57:55	+02:07
16	17	Iván Raña (ESP)	17:53	1:05:23	32:51	1:58:15	+02:27
17	10	Sven Riederer (SUI)	17:57	1:04:56	33:00	1:58:29	+02:41
18	5	Danylo Sapunov (UKR)	18:00	1:06:00	32:54	1:58:34	+02:46
19	45	Filip Ospalý (CZE)	18:41	1:05:59	33:09	1:58:42	+02:54
20	18	Frédéric Belaubre (FRA)	17:51	1:05:57	33:17	1:58:49	+03:01
21	19	Igor Polyanskiy (RUS)	17:53	1:05:19	33:23	1:58:58	+03:10
22	33	Duarte da Silva Marques (POR)	17:55	1:06:08	33:24	1:59:04	+03:16
23	30	Peter Croes (BEL)	18:23	1:06:12	33:40	1:59:09	+03:21
24	32	Pierre Le Corre (FRA)	17:53	1:06:15	33:45	1:59:20	+03:32
25	11	Joao Silva (POR)	17:57	1:05:31	33:55	1:59:29	+03:41
Source: Official results

=== Women's ===
Key

- # denotes the athlete's bib number for the event
- Swimming denotes the time it took the athlete to complete the swimming leg
- Cycling denotes the time it took the athlete to complete the cycling leg
- Running denotes the time it took the athlete to complete the running leg
- Difference denotes the time difference between the athlete and the event winner
- Lapped denotes that the athlete was lapped and removed from the course

Rank	#	Triathlete	Swimming	Cycling	Running	Total time	Difference
1st place, gold medalist(s)	8	Nicola Spirig (SUI)	19:59	1:10:43	34:51	2:07:11	—
2nd place, silver medalist(s)	3	Ainhoa Murua Zubizarreta (ESP)	20:02	1:10:11	35:26	2:07:20	+00:09
3rd place, bronze medalist(s)	1	Emmie Charayron (FRA)	20:00	1:10:47	35:34	2:07:56	+00:45
4	9	Jessica Harrison (FRA)	19:57	1:10:11	36:07	2:08:27	+01:16
5	2	Vendula Frintová (CZE)	19:57	1:10:47	36:36	2:09:00	+01:49
6	17	Agnieszka Jerzyk (POL)	20:22	1:10:43	35:11	2:09:23	+02:12
7	7	Helle Frederiksen (DEN)	19:57	1:10:45	37:13	2:09:34	+02:23
8	14	Irina Abysova (RUS)	19:56	1:11:37	37:29	2:09:52	+02:41
9	4	Yuliya Yelistratova (UKR)	20:32	1:10:39	35:49	2:10:00	+02:49
10	10	Carole Peon (FRA)	20:06	1:10:45	35:50	2:10:04	+02:53
11	11	Katrien Verstuyft (BEL)	20:24	1:11:37	35:55	2:10:04	+02:53
12	19	Alexandra Razarenova (RUS)	20:27	1:12:00	36:07	2:10:17	+03:06
13	22	Line Jensen (DEN)	20:01	1:11:38	36:49	2:11:00	+03:49
14	26	Lucy Hall (GBR)	19:38	1:11:35	38:51	2:11:14	+04:03
15	15	Vanessa Raw (GBR)	20:02	1:11:51	39:09	2:11:36	+04:25
16	24	Mariya Shorets (RUS)	20:28	1:11:02	38:04	2:12:17	+05:06
17	27	Lisa Perterer (AUT)	20:52	1:10:38	36:49	2:13:43	+06:32
18	28	Anja Knapp (GER)	19:55	1:11:35	40:02	2:14:13	+07:02
19	12	Maria Czesnik (POL)	20:31	1:13:49	37:36	2:14:30	+07:19
20	29	Lyubov Polyanskaya (RUS)	19:59	1:12:08	38:24	2:15:21	+08:10
21	16	Mateja Šimic (SLO)	20:25	1:14:08	38:56	2:15:48	+08:37
22	30	Anastasiya Polyanskaya (RUS)	20:19	1:14:46	39:05	2:15:58	+08:47
23	39	Fanny Beisaron (ISR)	20:51	1:14:17	39:17	2:16:14	+09:03
24	38	Anais Verguet-Moniz (POR)	20:31	1:14:23	40:33	2:17:29	+10:18
25	25	Carolina Routier (ESP)	19:56	1:13:54	40:33	2:17:29	+10:18
Source: Official results
