= 2008 ITU Triathlon World Cup =

Series details
- Races: 12

Men's World Cup
- 1st: Javier Gómez (ESP)
- 2nd: Bevan Docherty (NZL)
- 3rd: Ivan Vasiliev (RUS)
- Most wins: Javier Gómez (ESP) (5)

Women's World Cup
- 1st: Samantha Warriner (NZL)
- 2nd: Felicity Abram (AUS)
- 3rd: Helen Tucker (GBR)
- Most wins: Emma Snowsill (AUS) (3)

World Triathlon Cup (formerly ITU Triathlon World Cup)
← 2007	2009 →

The 2008 ITU Triathlon World Cup was a series of triathlon races organised by the International Triathlon Union (ITU) for elite-level triathletes. There were twelve races held in twelve countries, each held over a distance of 1500 m swim, 40 km cycle, 10 km run (an Olympic-distance triathlon). Alongside a prize purse, points were awarded at each race contributing towards the overall World Cup for which an additional prize purse was awarded. The 2008 World Cup was sponsored by BG Group. A separate one-off elite level race event also organised by the ITU, the 2008 ITU Triathlon World Championships, crowned the world champions for the season.

The 2008 World Cup series marked the final year of this race and championship format, as well as the final year of single race World Championship racing as the ITU shifted its focus to developing the World Championship Series. From 2009 onwards, the World Cup would represent the second tier of season long draft-legal triathlon below the new ITU Triathlon World Championship Series which crowned its world champion on aggregate points after a full season of events.

== Venues, dates and prize purses ==
Date	City	County	Prize purse (US$)
Mar 30	Mooloolaba	Australia	$100,000
Apr 6	New Plymouth	New Zealand	$100,000
Apr 13	Ishigaki	Japan	$100,000
Apr 26	Tongyeong	South Korea	$100,000
May 4	Richards Bay	South Africa	$100,000
May 25	Madrid	Spain	$100,000
Jun 22	Des Moines	United States	$700,000
Jul 5–6	Hamburg	Germany	$100,000
Jul 13	Tiszaújváros	Hungary	$100,000
Jul 20	Kitzbühel	Austria	$100,000
Sep 27–28	Lorient	France	$100,000
Oct 26	Huatulco	Mexico	$100,000

== Event results ==
=== Mooloolaba ===
Place	Men		Women	
Place	Name	Time	Name	Time
Gold medal	Javier Gómez (ESP)	1:49:50	Emma Snowsill (AUS)	2:00:44
Silver medal	Brad Kahlefeldt (AUS)	1:50:14	Vanessa Fernandes (POR)	2:01:22
Bronze medal	Tim Don (GBR)	1:50:23	Lisa Nordén (SWE)	2:01:22

=== New Plymouth ===
Place	Men		Women	
Place	Name	Time	Name	Time
Gold medal	Javier Gómez (ESP)	1:47:33	Emma Moffatt (AUS)	2:01:01
Silver medal	Brad Kahlefeldt (AUS)	1:48:03	Lisa Nordén (SWE)	2:01:07
Bronze medal	Andrew Johns (GBR)	1:48:16	Felicity Abram (AUS)	2:01:16

=== Ishigaki ===
Place	Men		Women	
Place	Name	Time	Name	Time
Gold medal	Simon Whitfield (CAN)	1:51:12	Emma Snowsill (AUS)	2:03:10
Silver medal	Rasmus Henning (DEN)	1:51:22	Erin Densham (AUS)	2:03:40
Bronze medal	Ivan Vasiliev (RUS)	1:51:32	Hollie Avil (GBR)	2:05:23

=== Tongyeong ===
Place	Men		Women	
Place	Name	Time	Name	Time
Gold medal	Tim Don (GBR)	1:38:14	Samantha Warriner (NZL)	1:49:49
Silver medal	Bevan Docherty (NZL)	1:38:22	Hollie Avil (GBR)	1:49:59
Bronze medal	Jan Frodeno (GER)	1:38:23	Vendula Frintová (CZE)	1:50:21

=== Richards Bay ===
Place	Men		Women	
Place	Name	Time	Name	Time
Gold medal	Daniel Unger (GER)	1:52:49	Carolyn Murray (CAN)	2:03:32
Silver medal	Matthew Reed (USA)	1:52:50	Felicity Abram (AUS)	2:03:35
Bronze medal	Hendrik De Villiers (RSA)	1:52:50	Magali di Marco Messmer (SUI)	2:03:41

=== Madrid ===
Place	Men		Women	
Place	Name	Time	Name	Time
Gold medal	Javier Gómez (ESP)	1:56:25	Vanessa Fernandes (POR)	2:04:46
Silver medal	Ivan Vasiliev (RUS)	1:56:44	Helen Tucker (GBR)	2:05:49
Bronze medal	Alistair Brownlee (GBR)	1:56:53	Daniela Ryf (SUI)	2:06:10

=== Des Moines ===
Place	Men		Women	
Place	Name	Time	Name	Time
Gold medal	Rasmus Henning (DEN)	1:54:21	Emma Snowsill (AUS)	2:03:15
Silver medal	Bevan Docherty (NZL)	1:54:29	Emma Moffatt (AUS)	2:04:35
Bronze medal	Greg Bennett (AUS)	1:54:32	Helen Tucker (GBR)	2:05:21

=== Hamburg ===
Place	Men		Women	
Place	Name	Time	Name	Time
Gold medal	Daniel Unger (GER)	1:46:51	Ricarda Lisk (GER)	1:57:42
Silver medal	Jan Frodeno (GER)	1:46:58	Felicity Abram (AUS)	1:58:25
Bronze medal	Oliver Freeman (GBR)	1:47:05	Debbie Tanner (NZL)	1:58:25

=== Tiszaújváros ===
Place	Men		Women	
Place	Name	Time	Name	Time
Gold medal	Javier Gómez (ESP)	1:51:31	Andrea Whitcombe (GBR)	2:02:47
Silver medal	Brad Kahlefeldt (AUS)	1:51:50	Felicity Abram (AUS)	2:03:33
Bronze medal	Steffen Justus (GER)	1:52:15	Mariana Ohata (BRA)	2:04:06

=== Kitzbühel ===
Place	Men		Women	
Place	Name	Time	Name	Time
Gold medal	Iván Raña (ESP)	1:45:23	Nicola Spirig (SUI)	1:57:28
Silver medal	Kris Gemmell (NZL)	1:45:29	Carole Peon (FRA)	1:57:34
Bronze medal	Sven Riederer (SUI)	1:45:30	Samantha Warriner (NZL)	1:58:04

=== Lorient ===
Place	Men		Women	
Place	Name	Time	Name	Time
Gold medal	Cédric Fleureton (FRA)	1:49:53	Lisa Nordén (SWE)	2:02:05
Silver medal	Tony Moulai (FRA)	1:51:01	Samantha Warriner (NZL)	2:02:39
Bronze medal	Iván Raña (ESP)	1:51:10	Jessica Harrison (FRA)	2:02:44

=== Huatulco ===
Place	Men		Women	
Place	Name	Time	Name	Time
Gold medal	Kris Gemmell (NZL)	2:03:23	Samantha Warriner (NZL)	2:14:02
Silver medal	Jarrod Shoemaker (USA)	2:03:32	Sarah Groff (USA)	2:14:45
Bronze medal	Laurent Vidal (FRA)	2:04:22	Andrea Whitcombe (GBR)	2:15:02

== Overall rankings ==
At each race of the series points were awarded to the top 20 finishers per the table below. In addition to the points awarded for the twelve World Cup legs, double points were awarded for results achieved in the ITU Triathlon World Championship race in Vancouver, British Columbia, Canada on 7–8 June 2008.

Finishing position	World Cup points
1	50
2	44
3	39
4	35
5	31
6	27
7	24
8	21
9	18
10	15
11	13
12	11
13	9
14	7
15	6
16	5
17	4
18	3
19	2
20	1

=== Men ===
Rank	Name	Points
1	Javier Gómez (ESP)	300
2	Bevan Docherty (NZL)	246
3	Ivan Vasiliev (RUS)	214
4	Tim Don (GBR)	169
5	Laurent Vidal (FRA)	159
6	Oliver Freeman (GBR)	156
7	Iván Raña (ESP)	155
8	Reto Hug (SUI)	140
9	Tony Moulai (FRA)	136
10	Simon Whitfield (CAN)	135

=== Women ===
Rank	Name	Points
1	Samantha Warriner (NZL)	282
2	Felicity Abram (AUS)	256
3	Helen Tucker (GBR)	210
4	Sarah Groff (USA)	200
5	Lisa Nordén (SWE)	197
6	Andrea Whitcombe (GBR)	180
7	Emma Moffatt (AUS)	174
8	Emma Snowsill (AUS)	150
9=	Erin Densham (AUS)	131
9=	Hollie Avil (GBR)	131

== Medal table ==
Rank	Nation	Men			Women			Total
Rank	Nation	Gold	Silver	Bronze	Gold	Silver	Bronze	Total
1	Australia		3	1	4	5	1	14
2	Great Britain	1		4	1	2	3	11
3	New Zealand	1	3		2	1	2	9
4=	Germany	2	1	2	1			6
4=	Spain	5		1				6
6	France	1	1	1		1	1	5
7	Switzerland			1	1		2	4
8=	Sweden				1	1	1	3
8=	United States		2			1		3
10=	Canada	1			1			2
10=	Denmark	1	1					2
10=	Portugal				1	1		2
10=	Russia		1	1				2
14=	Brazil						1	1
14=	Czech Republic						1	1
14=	South Africa			1				1

Note: Rank is arranged by total number of medals.
