= 2009 ITU Triathlon World Cup =

Series details
- Races: 5

Men's World Cup
- Most wins: 2: Courtney Atkinson (AUS)

Women's World Cup
- Most wins: 1: five athletes

World Triathlon Cup (formerly ITU Triathlon World Cup)
← 2008	2010 →

The 2009 ITU Triathlon World Cup was a series of triathlon races organised by the International Triathlon Union (ITU) for elite-level triathletes to be held during the 2009 season. For 2009, five races were announced as part of the World Cup series. Each race was held over a distance of 1500 m swim, 40 km cycle, 10 km run (an Olympic-distance triathlon). Alongside a prize purse, points were awarded at each race contributing towards the overall ITU Triathlon World Championships point totals; which was a change in format to the World Cup series of prior years.

The number of world cup races in 2009 were reduced as the ITU shifted focus to the Championship Series, and the World Cup curcuit in effect became the second tier of season-long standard-distance draft-legal triathlon racing.

From 2009 onwards, no separate World Cup champions were crowned.

== Venues, dates and prize purses ==
Date	City	County	Prize purse (US$)
Mar 29	Mooloolaba	Australia	80,000
Apr 26	Ishigaki	Japan	
Jun 28	Des Moines	United States	1,000,000
Aug 9	Tiszaújváros	Hungary	80,000
Nov 8	Huatulco	Mexico	80,000

== Event results ==
=== Mooloolaba ===
Place	Men			Women		
Place	Name	Nation	Time	Name	Nation	Time
Gold medal	Courtney Atkinson	Australia	1:52:05	Kirsten Sweetland	Canada	2:02:00
Silver medal	Kris Gemmell	New Zealand	1:52:17	Emma Moffatt	Australia	2:02:55
Bronze medal	Brad Kahlefeldt	Australia	1:52:51	Daniela Ryf	Switzerland	2:03:03

=== Ishigaki ===
Place	Men			Women		
Place	Name	Nation	Time	Name	Nation	Time
Gold medal	Courtney Atkinson	Australia	1:48:24	Juri Ide	Japan	2:03:32
Silver medal	Ivan Vasiliev	Russia	1:49:01	Kathy Tremblay	Canada	2:03:37
Bronze medal	Denis Vasiliev	Russia	1:49:22	Kiyomi Niwata	Japan	2:03:54

=== Des Moines ===
Place	Men			Women		
Place	Name	Nation	Time	Name	Nation	Time
Gold medal	Simon Whitfield	Canada	1:49:43	Emma Moffatt	Australia	1:59:46
Silver medal	Brad Kahlefeldt	Australia	1:49:44	Emma Snowsill	Australia	2:01:19
Bronze medal	Jan Frodeno	Germany	1:49:44	Lauren Groves	Canada	2:01:31

=== Tiszaújváros ===
Place	Men			Women		
Place	Name	Nation	Time	Name	Nation	Time
Gold medal	Dmitry Polyanski	Russia	1:48:46	Kate McIlroy	New Zealand	2:00:48
Silver medal	Alexander Brukhankov	Russia	1:48:55	Irina Abysova	Russia	2:00:52
Bronze medal	Ivan Tutukin	Russia	1:49:50	Felicity Sheedy-Ryan	Australia	2:01:24

=== Huatulco ===
Place	Men			Women		
Place	Name	Nation	Time	Name	Nation	Time
Gold medal	Matt Chrabot	United States	1:57:22	Ai Ueda	Japan	2:12:47
Silver medal	Ruedi Wild	Switzerland	1:59:32	Helle Frederiksen	Denmark	2:13:12
Bronze medal	Jarrod Shoemaker	United States	2:01:02	Jessica Harrison	France	2:13:29

== See also ==
- ITU Triathlon World Championships
