= Triathlon at the 2008 Summer Olympics – Women's =

Women's Triathlon at the Games of the XXIX Olympiad
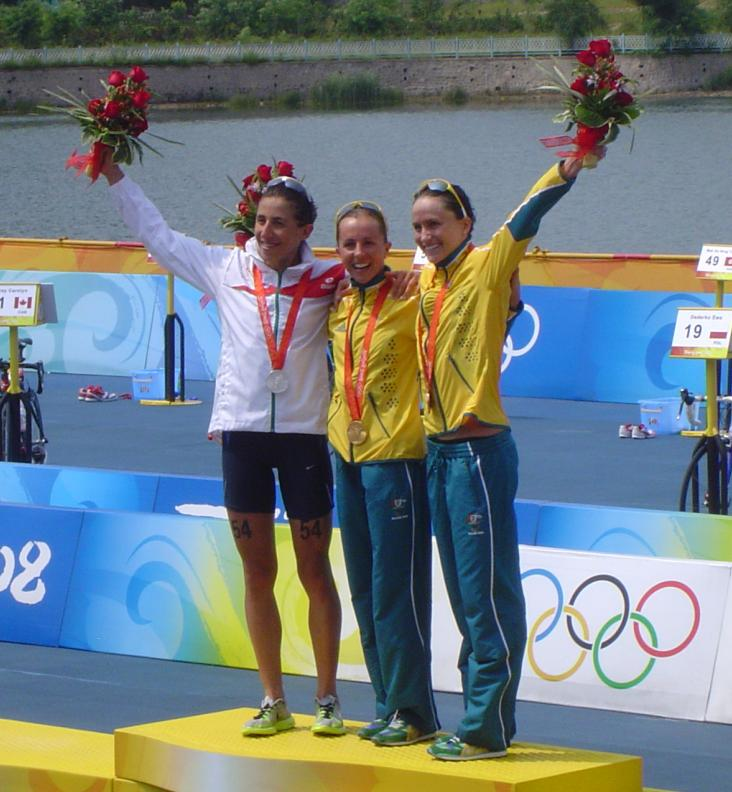
- Medal ceremony
- Venue: Triathlon Venue at the Ming Tomb Reservoir
- Date: 18 August
- Competitors: 55 from 30 nations
- Winning time: 1:58:27.66

Medalists
1st place, gold medalist(s)		Emma Snowsill	Australia
2nd place, silver medalist(s)		Vanessa Fernandes	Portugal
3rd place, bronze medalist(s)		Emma Moffatt	Australia

The women's triathlon was part of the triathlon at the 2008 Summer Olympics programme. It was the third appearance of the event, which was established in 2000. The competition was held on Monday, August 18, 2008 at the Triathlon Venue at the Ming Tomb Reservoir in Shisanling. Fifty-five triathletes from thirty nations competed.

For the first time in Olympic history, all three medalists finished the race in less than two hours.

== Competition format ==
The race was held over the "international distance" (also called "Olympic distance") and consisted of 1,500 metres (0.93 mi) swimming, 40 kilometres (25 mi), road cycling, and 10 kilometres (6.2 mi) road running.

== Results ==
Rank	#	Triathlete	Swimming	Cycling	Running	Total time^{*}	Difference
1st place, gold medalist(s)	34	Emma Snowsill (AUS)	19:51	1:04:20	33:17	1:58:27.66	—
2nd place, silver medalist(s)	54	Vanessa Fernandes (POR)	19:53	1:04:18	34:21	1:59:34.63	+1:06.97
3rd place, bronze medalist(s)	33	Emma Moffatt (AUS)	19:55	1:04:12	34:46	1:59:55.84	+1:28.18
4	40	Laura Bennett (USA)	19:49	1:04:23	35:10	2:00:21.54	+1:53.88
5	15	Juri Ide (JPN)	19:50	1:04:24	35:05	2:00:23.77	+1:56.11
6	8	Nicola Spirig (SUI)	20:17	1:03:54	35:20	2:00:30.48	+2:02.82
7	7	Daniela Ryf (SUI)	19:56	1:04:17	35:31	2:00:40.20	+2:12.54
8	25	Andrea Hewitt (NZL)	19:54	1:04:15	35:38	2:00:45.99	+2:18.33
9	16	Kiyomi Niwata (JPN)	19:56	1:04:14	35:36	2:00:51.85	+2:24.19
10	26	Debbie Tanner (NZL)	19:57	1:04:17	35:54	2:01:06.92	+2:39.26
11	42	Sarah Haskins (USA)	19:50	1:04:18	36:10	2:01:22.57	+2:54.91
12	9	Jessica Harrison (FRA)	19:56	1:04:14	36:19	2:01:31.74	+3:04.08
13	6	Magali di Marco (SUI)	19:50	1:04:22	36:39	2:01:50.74	+3:23.08
14	11	Kate Allen (AUT)	20:57	1:05:24	34:32	2:02:00.69	+3:33.03
15	4	Ricarda Lisk (GER)	20:00	1:04:12	36:46	2:02:07.75	+3:40.09
16	27	Samantha Warriner (NZL)	19:58	1:04:15	36:55	2:02:13.60	+3:45.94
17	17	Ai Ueda (JPN)	20:17	1:03:56	37:09	2:02:19.09	+3:51.43
18	50	Lisa Nordén (SWE)	20:56	1:05:26	35:05	2:02:27.47	+3:59.81
19	41	Julie Ertel (USA)	19:51	1:04:24	37:22	2:02:39.22	+4:11.56
20	37	Ana Burgos (ESP)	20:57	1:05:28	35:11	2:02:43.85	+4:16.19
21	31	Helen Tucker (GBR)	19:52	1:04:17	37:39	2:02:55.74	+4:28.08
22	32	Erin Densham (AUS)	20:54	1:05:27	35:46	2:03:08.76	+4:41.10
23	23	Vendula Frintová (CZE)	20:53	1:05:29	36:06	2:03:27.49	+4:59.83
24	43	Yuliya Sapunova (UKR)	21:02	1:05:18	36:09	2:03:34.39	+5:06.73
25	35	Bárbara Riveros (CHI)	20:21	1:06:03	36:16	2:03:42.56	+5:14.90
26	5	Christiane Pilz (GER)	20:00	1:04:09	38:29	2:03:46.82	+5:19.16
27	14	Tania Haiböck (AUT)	21:03	1:05:22	36:37	2:04:03.16	+5:35.50
28	38	Ainhoa Murúa (ESP)	19:59	1:07:06	36:38	2:04:48.07	+6:20.41
29	21	Carolyn Murray (CAN)	20:55	1:05:28	37:31	2:04:56.32	+6:28.66
30	19	Ewa Dederko (POL)	21:02	1:05:24	37:42	2:05:09.85	+6:42.19
31	22	Kathy Tremblay (CAN)	19:52	1:04:24	40:04	2:05:23.49	+6:55.83
32	47	Kate Roberts (RSA)	19:58	1:06:26	38:02	2:05:33.24	+7:05.58
33	3	Anja Dittmer (GER)	20:16	1:06:08	38:18	2:05:45.86	+7:18.20
34	10	Carole Péon (FRA)	20:22	1:06:41	37:55	2:06:04.28	+7:36.62
35	18	Maria Cześnik (POL)	20:02	1:06:58	38:05	2:06:12.02	+7:44.36
36	52	Olga Zausaylova (RUS)	20:58	1:05:24	39:01	2:06:24.26	+7:56.60
37	53	Emma Davis (IRL)	20:17	1:06:03	39:09	2:06:29.36	+8:01.70
38	36	Zita Szabó (HUN)	20:28	1:05:58	39:17	2:06:46.70	+8:19.04
39	48	Mariana Ohata (BRA)	20:02	1:06:24	39:43	2:07:11.92	+8:44.26
40	44	Xing Lin (CHN)	20:03	1:06:22	40:05	2:07:34.99	+9:07.33
41	56	Elizabeth May (LUX)	20:26	1:05:56	40:30	2:07:55.58	+9:27.92
42	45	Zhang Yi (CHN)	19:58	1:07:10	40:21	2:08:37.56	+10:09.90
43	46	Mari Rabie (RSA)	19:54	1:06:30	42:01	2:09:28.02	+11:00.36
44	1	Charlotte Bonin (ITA)	20:07	1:06:58	41:30	2:09:42.09	+11:14.43
45	39	Lisa Mensink (NED)	20:03	1:07:44	41:30	2:10:18.98	+11:51.32
—	2	Daniela Chmet (ITA)	20:31	LAP			
—	55	Deniz Dimaki (GRE)	21:36	LAP			
—	49	Tania Mak So Ning (HKG)	21:18	LAP			
—	28	Flora Duffy (BER)	20:26	LAP			
—	29	Adriana Corona (MEX)	21:16	LAP			
—	20	Lauren Groves (CAN)	20:05	Did not finish			
—	24	Lenka Zemanová (CZE)	20:00	Did not finish			
—	51	Irina Abysova (RUS)	19:56	Did not finish			
—	30	Hollie Avil (GBR)	20:09	Did not finish			
—	12	Eva Dollinger (AUT)	20:04	Did not finish			

- * Including Transition 1 (swimming-to-cycling) and T2 (cycling-to-running), roughly a minute.
- No one is allotted the number 13.
- LAP - Lapped by the leader on the cycling course.

== Gallery ==
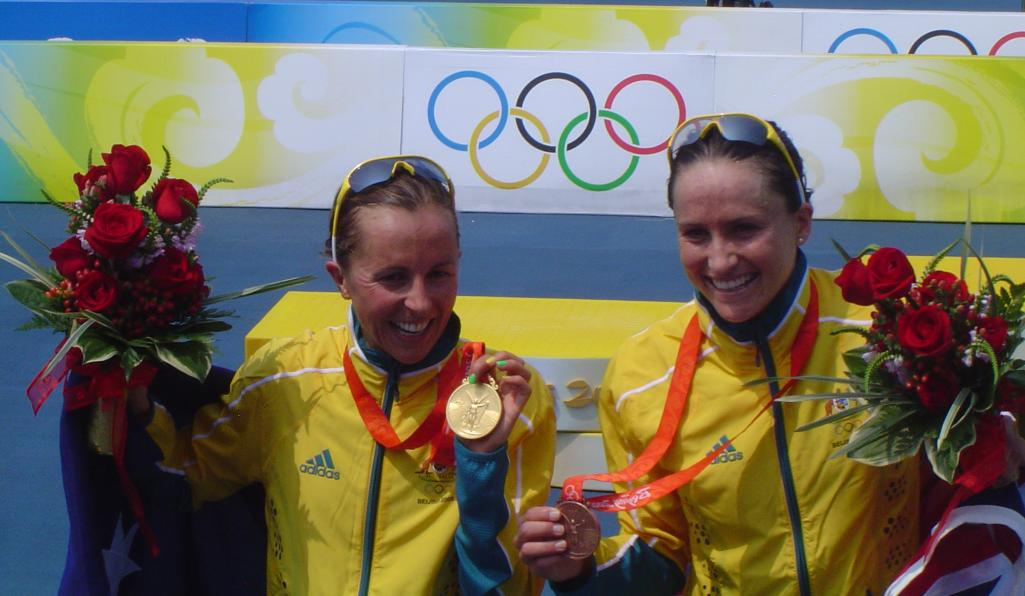
Snowsill (left) and Moffatt (right) show off their medals.

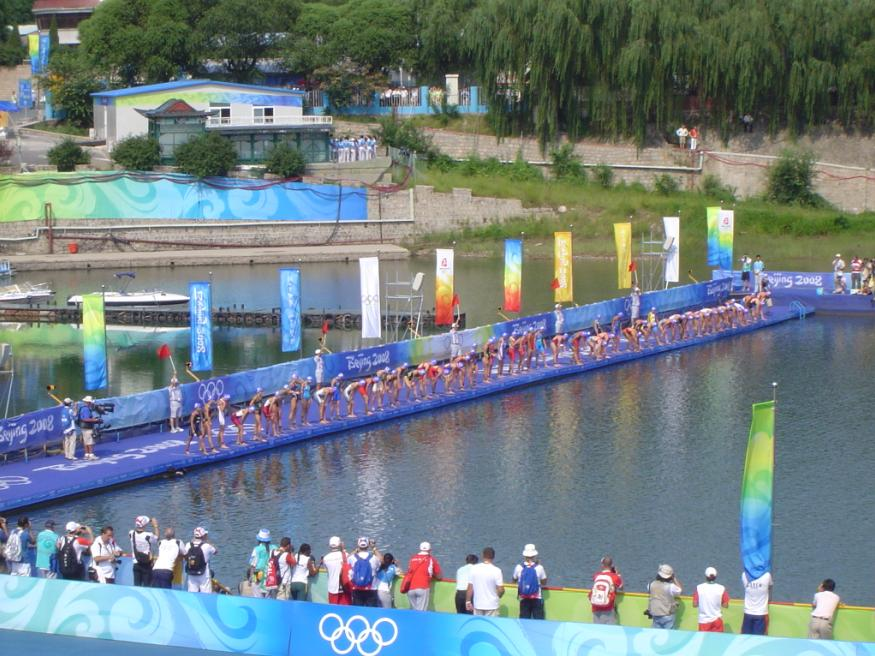
The start of the swimming

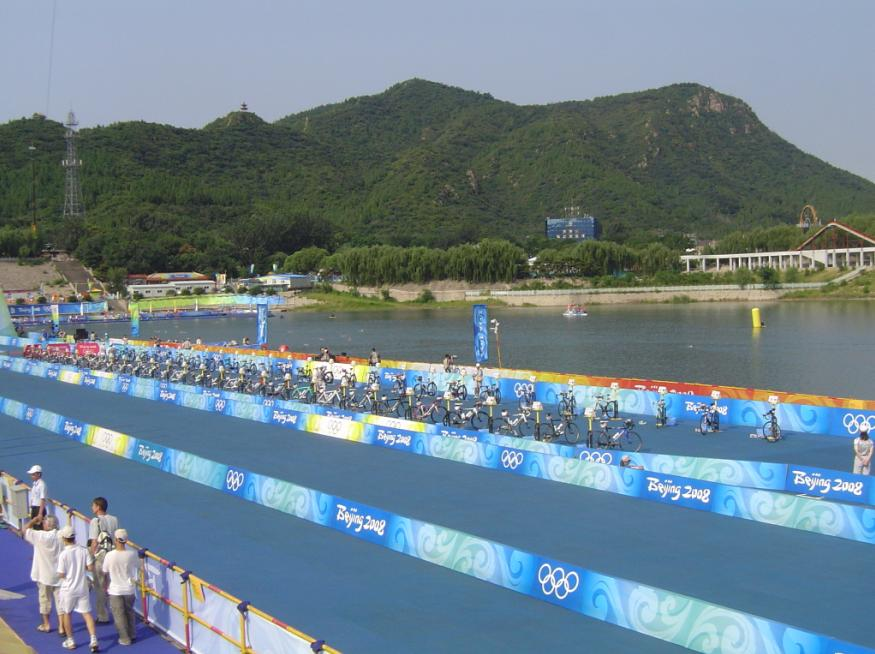
The transition area

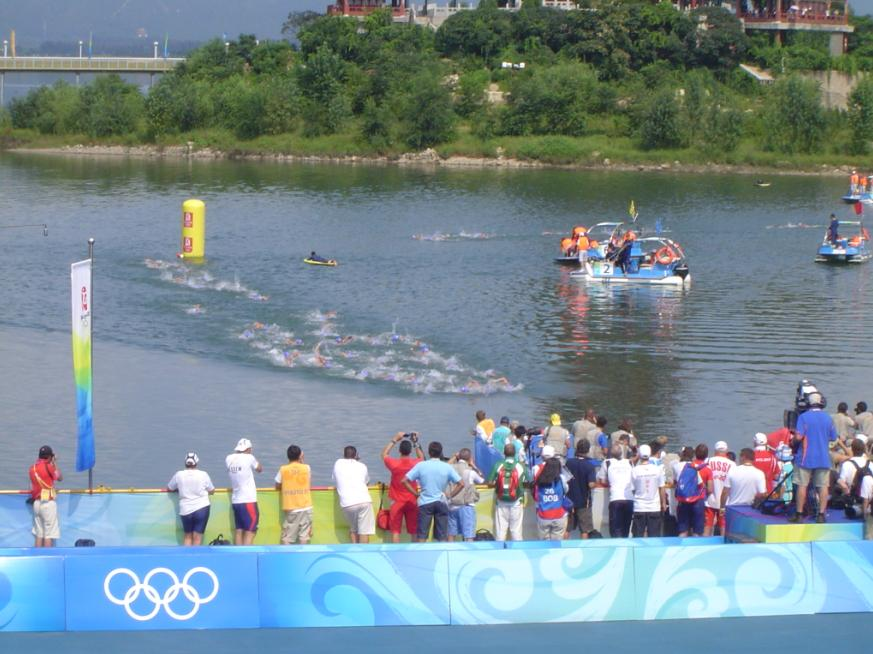
Swimming

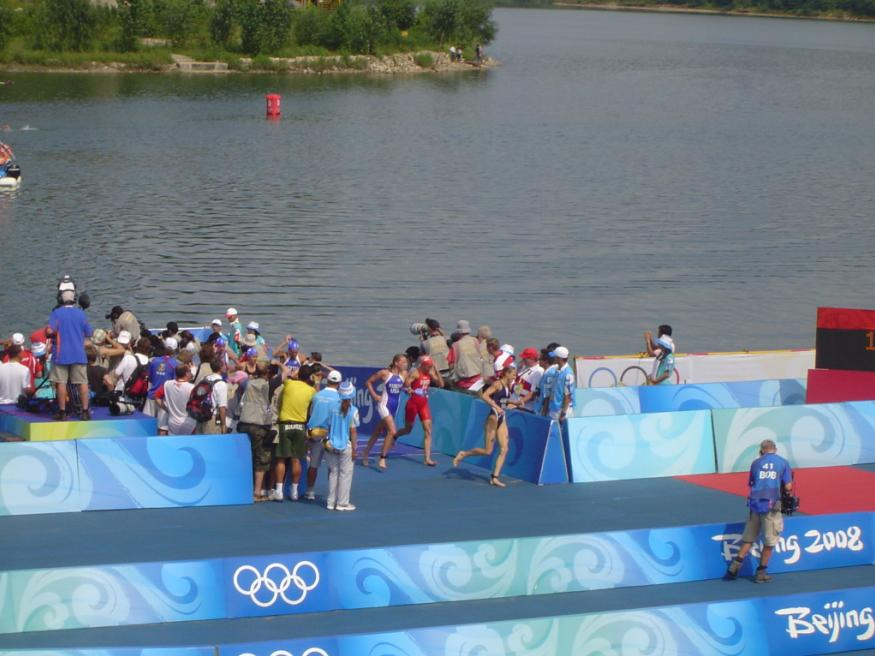
First transition from swimming to cycling: from the right Laura Bennett, Magali di Marco, Sarah Haskins.

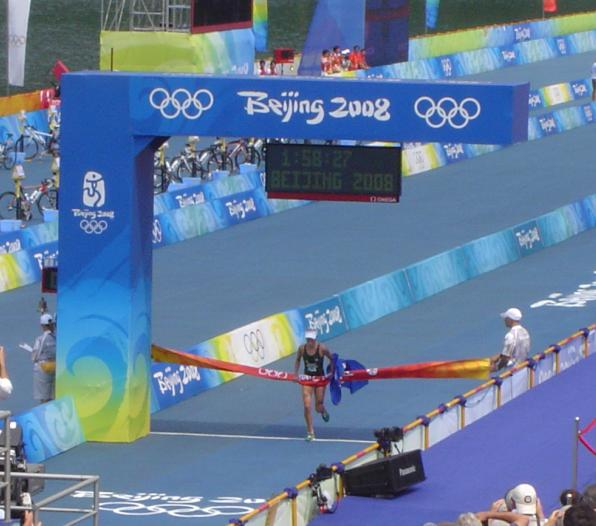
Snowsill crossing the finish line.
