= 2007 ITU Triathlon World Cup =

Series details
- Races: 15

Men's World Cup
- 1st: Javier Gómez (ESP)
- 2nd: Simon Whitfield (CAN)
- 3rd: Brad Kahlefeldt (AUS)
- Most wins: Javier Gómez (4)

Women's World Cup
- 1st: Vanessa Fernandes (POR)
- 2nd: Emma Moffatt (AUS)
- 3rd: Samantha Warriner (NZL)
- Most wins: Vanessa Fernandes (6)

World Triathlon Cup (formerly ITU Triathlon World Cup)
← 2006	2008 →

The 2007 ITU Triathlon World Cup was a series of triathlon races organised by the International Triathlon Union (ITU) for elite-level triathletes. There were fifteen races held in fourteen countries, each held over a distance of 1500 m swim, 40 km cycle, 10 km run (an Olympic-distance triathlon). Alongside a prize purse, points were awarded at each race contributing towards the overall World Cup for which an additional prize purse was awarded. The 2007 World Cup was sponsored by BG Group.

== Venues, dates and prize purses ==
Date	City	County	Prize purse (US$)
Mar 25	Mooloolaba	Australia	100,000
Apr 15	Ishigaki	Japan	100,000
May 6	Lisbon	Portugal	100,000
May 13	Richards Bay	South Africa	100,000
Jun 3	Madrid	Spain	100,000
Jun 10	Vancouver	Canada	100,000
Jun 17	Des Moines	United States	700,000
Jun 24	Edmonton	Canada	100,000
Jul 22	Kitzbuehel	Austria	100,000
Jul 29	Salford	United Kingdom	100,000
Aug 12	Tiszaújváros	Hungary	100,000
Sep 16	Beijing	China	100,000
Oct 7	Rhodes	Greece	100,000
Nov 3	Cancún	Mexico	65,000
Dec 1	Eilat	Israel	50,000

== Event results ==
=== Mooloolaba ===
Place	Men			Women		
Place	Name	Nation	Time	Name	Nation	Time
Gold medal	Brad Kahlefeldt	Australia	1:49:22	Emma Snowsill	Australia	1:59:20
Silver medal	Javier Gómez	Spain	1:49:26	Erin Densham	Australia	1:59:51
Bronze medal	Kris Gemmell	New Zealand	1:49:36	Vanessa Fernandes	Portugal	2:00:01

=== Ishigaki ===
Place	Men			Women		
Place	Name	Nation	Time	Name	Nation	Time
Gold medal	Courtney Atkinson	Australia	1:53:27	Vanessa Fernandes	Portugal	2:04:16
Silver medal	Bevan Docherty	New Zealand	1:54:13	Emma Snowsill	Australia	2:04:34
Bronze medal	Kris Gemmell	New Zealand	1:54:26	Debbie Tanner	New Zealand	2:04:51

=== Lisbon ===
Place	Men			Women		
Place	Name	Nation	Time	Name	Nation	Time
Gold medal	Javier Gómez	Spain	1:52:41	Vanessa Fernandes	Portugal	2:04:45
Silver medal	Filip Ospalý	Czech Republic	1:52:53	Michelle Dillon	Great Britain	2:06:05
Bronze medal	Brad Kahlefeldt	Australia	1:52:58	Christiane Pilz	Germany	2:06:30

=== Richards Bay ===
Place	Men			Women		
Place	Name	Nation	Time	Name	Nation	Time
Gold medal	Hendrik De Villiers	South Africa	1:52:53	Kirsten Sweetland	Canada	2:03:32
Silver medal	Volodymyr Polikarpenko	Ukraine	1:52:56	Magali Di marco Messmer	Switzerland	2:03:47
Bronze medal	Alexander Brukhankov	Russia	1:53:01	Christiane Pilz	Germany	2:03:49

=== Madrid ===
Place	Men			Women		
Place	Name	Nation	Time	Name	Nation	Time
Gold medal	Filip Ospalý	Czech Republic	1:55:47	Vanessa Fernandes	Portugal	2:07:33
Silver medal	Javier Gómez	Spain	1:55:52	Andrea Hewitt	New Zealand	2:08:25
Bronze medal	Iván Raña	Spain	1:56:06	Michelle Dillon	United Kingdom	2:08:30

=== Vancouver ===
Place	Men			Women		
Place	Name	Nation	Time	Name	Nation	Time
Gold medal	Simon Whitfield	Canada	1:49:16	Samantha Warriner	New Zealand	2:03:25
Silver medal	Andy Potts	United States	1:49:18	Sarah Haskins	United States	2:04:00
Bronze medal	Matthew Reed	United States	1:50:10	Erin Densham	Australia	2:04:10

=== Des Moines ===
Place	Men			Women		
Place	Name	Nation	Time	Name	Nation	Time
Gold medal	Rasmus Henning	Denmark	1:50:04	Laura Bennett	United States	2:04:32
Silver medal	Bevan Docherty	New Zealand	1:50:34	Annabel Luxford	Australia	2:04:47
Bronze medal	Javier Gómez	Spain	1:50:46	Mariana Ohata	Brazil	2:05:30

=== Edmonton ===
Place	Men			Women		
Place	Name	Nation	Time	Name	Nation	Time
Gold medal	Bevan Docherty	New Zealand	1:45:54	Emma Moffatt	Australia	1:57:52
Silver medal	Alexander Brukhankov	Russia	1:46:14	Kirsten Sweetland	Canada	1:57:53
Bronze medal	Sven Riederer	Switzerland	1:46:42	Annabel Luxford	Australia	1:58:10

=== Kitzbuehel ===
Place	Men			Women		
Place	Name	Nation	Time	Name	Nation	Time
Gold medal	Simon Whitfield	Canada	1:42:56	Andrea Hewitt	New Zealand	1:54:31
Silver medal	Frédéric Belaubre	France	1:42:57	Eva Dollinger	Austria	1:54:34
Bronze medal	Brad Kahlefeldt	Australia	1:43:01	Nicky Samuels	New Zealand	1:54:45

=== Salford ===
Place	Men			Women		
Place	Name	Nation	Time	Name	Nation	Time
Gold medal	Javier Gómez	Spain	1:51:47	Vanessa Fernandes	Portugal	2:02:59
Silver medal	Brad Kahlefeldt	Australia	1:51:59	Samantha Warriner	New Zealand	2:03:17
Bronze medal	Simon Whitfield	Canada	1:52:04	Kate Allen	Austria	2:03:23

=== Tiszaújváros ===
Place	Men			Women		
Place	Name	Nation	Time	Name	Nation	Time
Gold medal	Javier Gómez	Spain	1:47:44	Samantha Warriner	New Zealand	2:00:11
Silver medal	Kris Gemmell	New Zealand	1:47:52	Emma Moffatt	Australia	2:00:31
Bronze medal	Frédéric Belaubre	France	1:48:03	Debbie Tanner	New Zealand	2:00:35

=== Beijing ===
Place	Men			Women		
Place	Name	Nation	Time	Name	Nation	Time
Gold medal	Javier Gómez	Spain	1:48:41	Vanessa Fernandes	Portugal	2:00:36
Silver medal	Courtney Atkinson	Australia	1:49:04	Emma Snowsill	Australia	2:01:51
Bronze medal	Bevan Docherty	New Zealand	1:49:08	Laura Bennett	United States	2:02:06

=== Rhodes ===
Place	Men			Women		
Place	Name	Nation	Time	Name	Nation	Time
Gold medal	Kris Gemmell	New Zealand	1:51:53	Vanessa Fernandes	Portugal	2:02:06
Silver medal	Alistair Brownlee	Great Britain	1:51:57	Andrea Whitcombe	Great Britain	2:03:05
Bronze medal	Courtney Atkinson	Australia	1:52:20	Vendula Frintová	Czech Republic	2:03:21

=== Cancún ===
Place	Men			Women		
Place	Name	Nation	Time	Name	Nation	Time
Gold medal	Simon Whitfield	Canada	1:52:05	Julie Ertel	United States	2:03:22
Silver medal	Paul Tichelaar	Canada	1:52:06	Carole Peon	France	2:03:34
Bronze medal	Volodymyr Polikarpenko	Ukraine	1:52:08	Sarah Haskins	United States	2:03:37

=== Eilat ===
Place	Men			Women		
Place	Name	Nation	Time	Name	Nation	Time
Gold medal	Hirokatsu Tayama	Japan	1:49:46	Nicola Spirig	Switzerland	2:02:42
Silver medal	Volodymyr Polikarpenko	Ukraine	1:50:32	Juri Ide	Japan	2:03:10
Bronze medal	Alexander Brukhankov	Russia	1:50:36	Annabel Luxford	Australia	2:03:21

== Overall rankings ==
At each race of the series points were awarded to the top 20 finishers per the table below. Double points were awarded for results achieved in the ITU Triathlon World Championship race in Hamburg, Germany on 1–2 September.

Finishing position	World Cup points
1	50
2	44
3	39
4	35
5	31
6	27
7	24
8	21
9	18
10	15
11	13
12	11
13	9
14	7
15	6
16	5
17	4
18	3
19	2
20	1

=== Men ===
Rank	Name	Points
1	Javier Gómez (ESP)	415
2	Simon Whitfield (CAN)	338
3	Brad Kahlefeldt (AUS)	298
4	Bevan Docherty (NZL)	286
5	Kris Gemmell (NZL)	261
6	Volodymyr Polikarpenko (UKR)	214
7	Alexander Brukhankov (RUS)	213
8	Courtney Atkinson (AUS)	164
9	Iván Raña (ESP)	136
10	Daniel Unger (GER)	135

=== Women ===
Rank	Name	Points
1	Vanessa Fernandes (POR)	439
2	Emma Moffatt (AUS)	259
3	Samantha Warriner (NZL)	254
4	Emma Snowsill (AUS)	226
5	Debbie Tanner (NZL)	225
6	Nicola Spirig (SUI)	222
7	Laura Bennett (USA)	216
8	Sarah Haskins (USA)	196
8	Annabel Luxford (USA)	196
10	Magali Messmer (SUI)	170

== Medal table ==
Rank	Nation	Men			Women			Total
Rank	Nation	Gold	Silver	Bronze	Gold	Silver	Bronze	Total
1	Australia	2	2	3	2	5	3	17
2	New Zealand	2	3	3	3	2	3	16
3	Spain	4	2	2	0	0	0	8
4	Canada	3	1	1	1	1	0	7
4	Portugal	0	0	0	6	0	1	7
4	United States	0	1	1	2	1	2	7
7	Great Britain	0	1	0	0	2	1	4
8	Czech Republic	1	1	0	0	0	1	3
8	France	0	1	1	0	1	0	3
8	Russia	0	1	2	0	0	0	3
8	Switzerland	0	0	1	1	1	0	3
8	Ukraine	0	2	1	0	0	0	3
13	Austria	0	0	0	0	1	1	2
13	Germany	0	0	0	0	0	2	2
13	Japan	1	0	0	0	1	0	2
16	Brazil	0	0	0	0	0	1	1
16	Denmark	1	0	0	0	0	0	1
16	South Africa	1	0	0	0	0	0	1

Note: Rank is arranged by total number of medals.

== See also ==
- ITU Triathlon World Championships
