= 2012 ITU Triathlon Mixed Relay World Championship =

Triathlon Mixed Relay World Championship 2012
- Location: Stockholm, Sweden
- Date: 26 August 2012
- Nations: 20
- Teams: 22

Medalists
gold medal	Great Britain
silver medal	France
bronze medal	Russia

The 2012 ITU Triathlon Mixed Relay World Championship was held in Stockholm, Sweden on 26 August 2012. The championship was the seventh team championship held, and the fourth since the championships were reformatted in 2009, eliminating the separate male and female teams and running the championships with mixed teams. The team championship event coincided with the same weekend as the 2012 ITU World Triathlon Series Stockholm race.

Each team was allowed to enter 2 teams of four, made up of 2 females and 2 males. The teams competed in the following order - female–male–female–male. Each athlete completed a 300-metre swim, a 6 kilometre bike ride and a 2 kilometre run.

== Results ==
The ITU events in Stockholm were the first since the Olympic games almost two weeks prior, with some Olympians who participated in 2011 team Championship choosing not to take part in this year's event. Twenty-two teams representing 20 countries began the competition. With the help of 2012 Olympic Triathlon bronze medalist Jonathan Brownlee, Great Britain was able to defend its 2011 Team Triathlon World Championship. The French team finished second, finishing ten seconds behind Britain. The Russian team came in 3rd to claim the bronze. The American team failed to finish after falling too far behind its competition.

Rank	Team	Time
Gold medal	Great Britain I	1:26:48
Gold medal	• Vicky Holland: 23:24 • Will Clarke: 20:39 • Non Stanford: 22:56 • Jonathan Brownlee: 19:51	1:26:48
Silver medal	France	1:26:58
Silver medal	• Jessica Harrison: 23:07 • Tony Moulai: 20:41 • Carole Péon: 23:26 • Vincent Luis: 19:45	1:26:58
Bronze medal	Russia	1:27:31
Bronze medal	• Irina Abysova: 23:09 • Dmitry Polyanski: 21:17 • Alexandra Razarenova: 22:46 • Alexander Bryukhankov: 20:20	1:27:31
4	Germany II	1:28:06
5	Switzerland	1:28:38
6	Spain	1:28:43
7	Italy	1:28:52
8	Hungary	1:29:05
9	Ukraine	1:29:20
10	New Zealand	1:29:27
11	Czech Republic	1:29:42
12	Sweden	1:29:44
13	Netherlands	1:29:49
14	Japan	1:30:02
15	Australia	1:31:15
16	Canada	1:31:26
17	South Africa	1:31:30
18	Belgium	1:31:48
19	Brazil	1:32:57
NC	Germany I	1:28:33
NC	Great Britain II	1:31:23
DNF	United States	0:00:00
