= Bryukhankov =

Bryukhankov (Russian: Брюханков) is a Russian surname. Notable people with the surname include:

- Alexander Bryukhankov (born 1987), Russian triathlete
- Andrey Bryukhankov (born 1991), Russian triathlete, brother of Alexander
