= Ewa Dederko =

Polish triathlete

Personal information
- Born: 19 May 1974 (age 52) Blachownia, Poland
- Height: 1.60 m (5 ft 3 in)
- Weight: 48 kg (106 lb)

Sport
- Country: Poland
- Club: WLKS Kmicic Częstochowa

Ewa Dederko (born May 19, 1974 in Blachownia) is a triathlete from Poland, who competed at the 2008 Summer Olympics in Beijing. Dederko placed thirtieth in the women's triathlon with a time of 2:05:09.

At the peak of her career, Dederko took part in more than 50 ITU and ETU competitions, and had achieved twenty top-ten finishes. Her best results happened in 2002, when she claimed the gold medal at the ITU European Triathlon Cup in Sofia, Bulgaria. She is also a twelve-time Polish triathlon champion.
