= Deniz Dimaki =

Greek triathlete (born 1977)

Deniz Dimaki (Greek: Ντενίζ Δημάκη, born September 4, 1977) is a triathlete from Greece. She represented Greece in triathlon at the 2008 Summer Olympics.

== Career ==
Dimaki started her competitive career in 1990 as a medium and long-distance runner. She took up triathlon in 2002 and has won the Greek Triathlon Championship a record nine consecutive times (2002–2010) while at the same time she posted top finishes in other sports such as running and cycling.

== Top finishes ==
Her notable results include:

- 1st at the 2005 Ierapetra ITU Triathlon Balkan Championships
- 3rd at the 2006 Erdek ITU Triathlon European Cup
- 2nd at the 2007 Limassol ITU Triathlon European Cup and Small States of Europe Championships
- 3rd at the 2007 Kusadasi ITU Triathlon European Cup
- 1st at the 2007 Gallipoli ITU Triathlon European Cup and Balkan Championships
- 1st at the 2007 Egirdir ITU Triathlon European Cup
- 2nd at the 2007 Split ITU Triathlon European Cup
- 2nd at the 2007 Alanya ITU Triathlon Premium European Cup
- 3rd at the 2008 Chania ITU Triathlon European Cup
- 3rd at the 2008 Serres ETU Duathlon European Championships
- 1st at the 2008 Belgrade ITU Triathlon European Cup and Balkan Championships

Her coach for most of her professional career is her husband Chris Vaxevanis former marathon champion runner.

Since 2010 Dimaki has returned to long-distance running.
