= Christiane Pilz =

German triathlete

Personal information
- Born: 3 August 1975 (age 50) Karl-Marx-Stadt, Saxony, East Germany
- Height: 1.69 m (5 ft 7 in)
- Weight: 55 kg (121 lb)

Sport
- Country: Germany
- Club: SC Neubrandenburg
- Coached by: Klaus-Peter Weippert; Christian Bartsch
Medal record
Women's triathlon
Representing Germany
ITU Triathlon World Cup
Silver medal – second place	2005 Tiszaújváros	Elite
Bronze medal – third place	2007 Lisbon	Elite
Bronze medal – third place	2007 Richards Bay	Elite

Christiane Pilz (born 3 August 1975) is a German triathlete who competed at the 2008 Summer Olympics in Beijing.

== Biography ==
Pilz started out both as a sailor and a swimmer for thirteen years, until she began with her triathlon career at the age of twenty. In 1997, she was admitted to the club PSV Rostock, and won several titles at the national championships for both triathlon and duathlon. Pilz reached into the international stage in triathlon, when she placed twelfth at the 1999 ETU Triathlon European Championships in Funchal, Madeira, Portugal, and in 2000, she claimed her first medal at the FISU World University Triathlon Championships in Tiszaújváros, Hungary.

Between 2000 and 2004, Pilz took part in several ITU European and World Championships, and had achieved at least five top-ten finishes. Her best result happened in 2002, when she obtained her first major championship title at the ITU Triathlon European Cup in Hamburg. She was selected to the national team for the 2004 Summer Olympics in Athens, Greece, but eventually withdrew from the competition, because of an elbow injury from a cycling accident. Having missed out of the Olympics, Pilz was able to persist and perform well in triathlon, as she claimed one silver and two bronze medals, and had reached four more top-ten positions at the ITU Triathlon World Cup. She had an opportunity to compete at the 2008 Summer Olympics in Beijing, after finishing seventh at the ITU Triathlon World Cup in Madrid, Spain, and qualified for the last berth, against her compatriot Joelle Franzmann. At the Olympics, Pilz finished twenty-sixth out of 55 competitors in the women's triathlon, with a time of 2:03:46.

Pilz is currently a member of SC Neubrandenburg, coached by Klaus-Peter Weippert and Christian Bartsch, and works as a police department official in Rostock, Mecklenburg-Vorpommern.
