= Debbie Tanner =

New Zealand triathlete

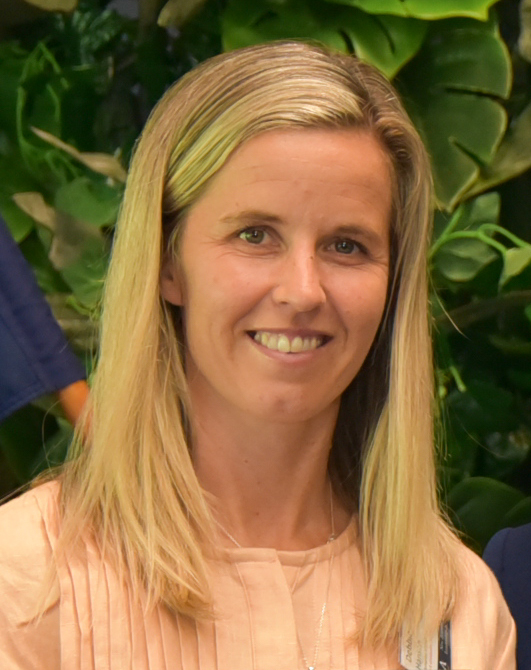
- Tanner (now Hansen) in 2020

Personal information
- Born: 8 October 1982 (age 43) Auckland, New Zealand
- Height: 1.63 m (5 ft 4 in)
- Weight: 48 kg (106 lb)

Sport
- Country: New Zealand
- Coached by: Pete Pfitzinger
Medal record
Women's triathlon
Representing New Zealand
ITU Triathlon World Cup
Gold medal – first place	2006 Ishigaki	Elite
Silver medal – second place	2006 Hamburg	Elite
Bronze medal – third place	2007 Ishigaki	Elite
Bronze medal – third place	2007 Tiszaujvaros	Elite
Bronze medal – third place	2008 Hamburg	Elite

Debbie Stella Tanner (now Hansen; born 8 October 1982 in Auckland) is a triathlete from New Zealand, who placed fourth at the 2006 Commonwealth Games in Melbourne, and competed at the 2008 Summer Olympics in Beijing.

== Biography ==
Tanner started out her sporting career at the age of eleven in the Weetbix Triathlon, and had won national and secondary school titles in swimming, cycling, running and triathlon. By age fifteen, she received the honours award for her recognition in academics and sports, and was made deputy head prefect and school sports captain in her final year. Tanner eventually attended the University of Auckland, where she completed her bachelor's degree in Sport Science and Recreation. Tanner's sister, Nikki Jean qualified for the women's backstroke swimming at the 1998 Commonwealth Games in Kuala Lumpur.

=== Athletic career ===
Tanner was admitted to the national team when she first competed for the junior category at the 2000 ITU World Championships in Perth, and since then, she had proven her tenacity, endurance, and positivity to reach into a higher level within the international scene. In 2006, Tanner qualified for the 2006 Commonwealth Games in Melbourne, and was selected to the national team; however, her training and willpower was insufficiently enough to win a medal, as she finished fourth in the women's triathlon, just behind her compatriot Andrea Hewitt. Despite her sudden and disappointing result, Tanner recaptured her success and triumph at the ITU World Triathlon Cup in the same year, as she clinched her major international title in Ishigaki. Following her first triumph, Tanner continued to stand on the podiums at World Cup events, by obtaining the silver in Hamburg, and three bronze medals at different locations across Europe and Asia. In addition to her five World Cup medals, Tanner had achieved nine more finishes in the top ten position.

Tanner competed at the 2008 Summer Olympics in Beijing for the first time, where she placed tenth in the women's triathlon, just behind her compatriot Hewitt by just two places, with the time of 2:01:06. Her participation and fair performance at the Olympics reinforced her ambition of striving to be the best triathlete for New Zealand, and for an Olympic gold medal at the subsequent games. In 2009, Tanner achieved her target by winning the gold medal at the ITU Triathlon Oceania Cup in Wellington. She also performed consistently by taking part in seven competitions of the Dextro Energy World Championship Series, where she only obtained a top ten finish, without winning a single medal. Tanner, however, was beaten again by Hewitt at the 2010 OTU Triathlon Oceania Championships in Wellington, where she finished only in second place.

With her consistent performance being ended up in poor results at a span of three years, Tanner missed out on the national team for the 2012 Summer Olympics in London. On 20 October 2012, Tanner announced her retirement in triathlon, following the women's event at the Barfoot & Thompson World Triathlon Grand Final in Auckland.
