= Olga Zausaylova =

Russian triathlete

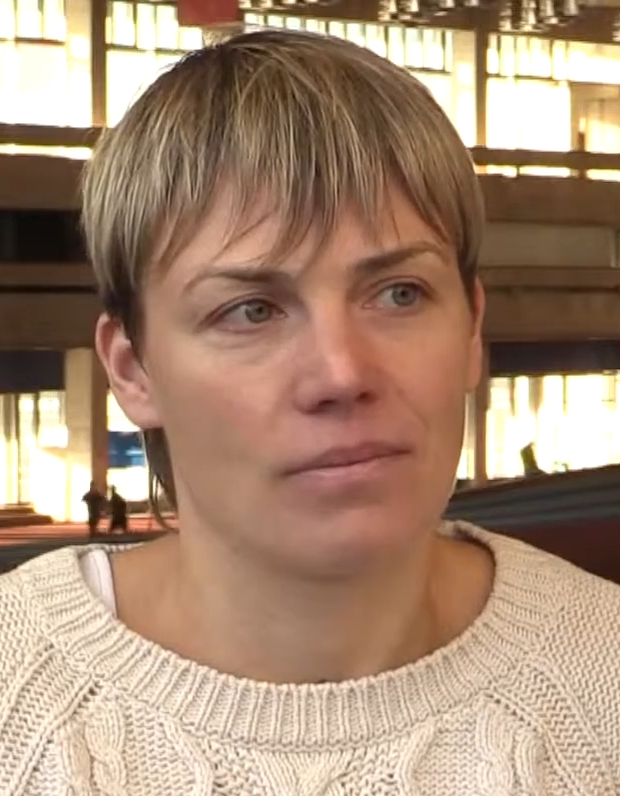
- Olga Zausaylova in February 2015

Personal information
- Full name: Olga Alexandrovna Zausaylova
- Born: 2 January 1978 (age 48) Neftegorsk, Russian SFSR
- Height: 1.71 m (5 ft 7 in)
- Weight: 58 kg (128 lb)

Sport
- Country: Russia
- Club: Toc Cesson Savigne (FRA)

Olga Alexandrovna Zausaylova (Russian: Ольга Александровна Заусайлова; born January 2, 1978, in Neftegorsk) is a triathlete from Russia, who competed at the 2008 Summer Olympics in Beijing. Zausaylova placed thirty-sixth in the women's triathlon with a time of 2:06:24.

At the peak of her career, Zausaylova took part in 50 triathlon competitions, and had achieved twelve top-ten finishes. Her best results happened in 2003, when she claimed the gold medal at the ITU Asian Triathlon Cup in Burabay, Kazakhstan with her personal best of 1:59:24.
