= Courtney Atkinson =

Australian triathlete (born 1979)

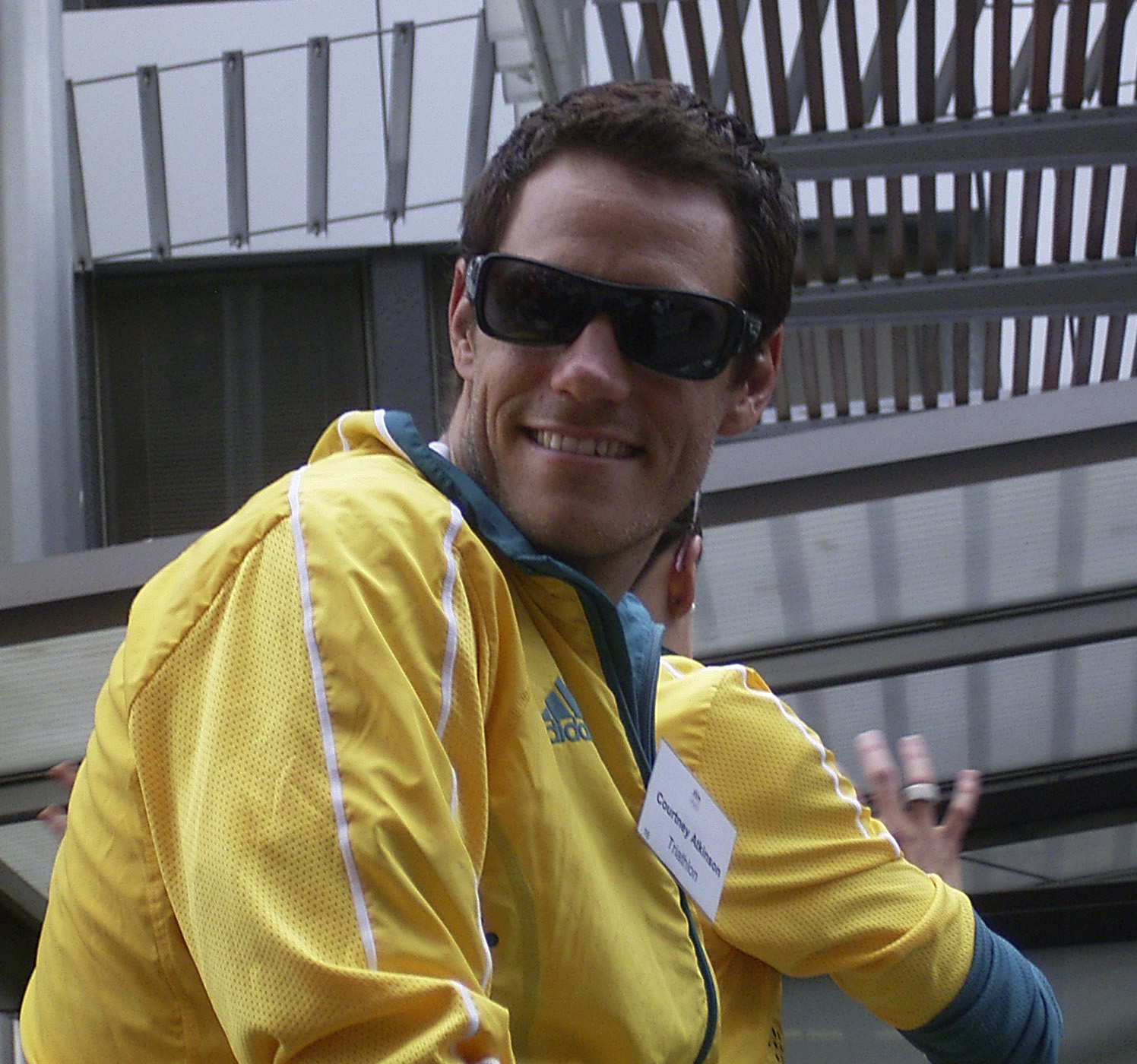
- Courtney Atkinson, Brisbane, 2008

Personal information
- Born: 15 August 1979 (age 47) Mackay, Queensland, Australia
- Height: 176 cm (5 ft 9 in)
- Weight: 67 kg (148 lb)

Sport
- Country: Australia

Courtney Atkinson (born 15 August 1979) is a professional Australian triathlete born in Mackay, Queensland.

Atkinson was a member of Australia's 2008 Olympic triathlon team, where he finished 11th in men's triathlon, and the 2012 Olympic triathlon team where he placed 18th. Additionally in his career Atkinson won the Men's International Triathlon Union (ITU) 2009 World Cup races in Mooloolaba and Ishigaki and had won four consecutive Australian Junior Triathlon Championships from 1996 to 1999. In 2002, 2003 and 2004 he was Australia's Triathlete of the Year.

Atkinson moved to the 70.3 IRONMAN distance in 2013 and won his first event in Cairns
