= Andrey Bryukhankov =

Russian triathlete

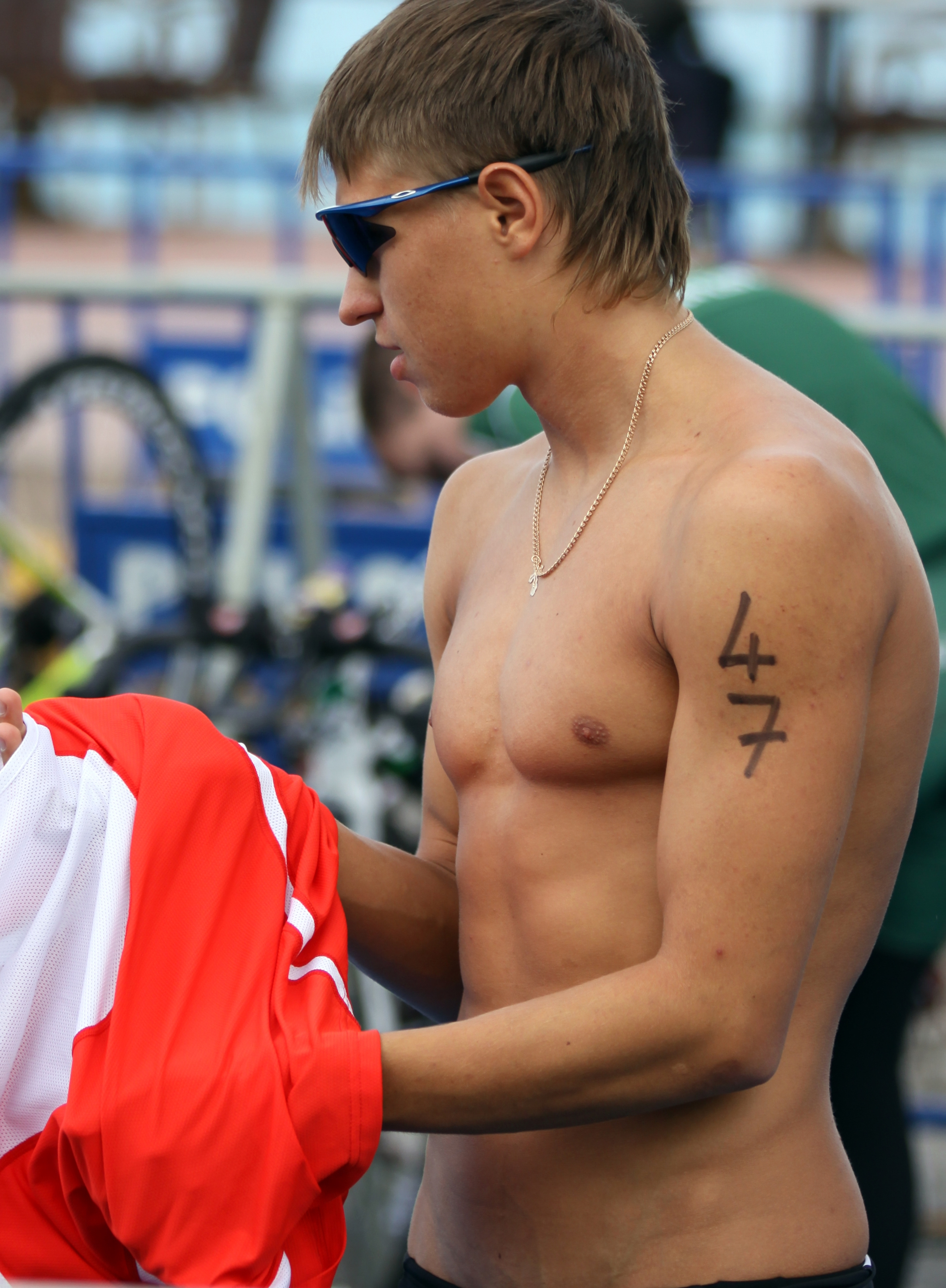
Andrey Bryukhankov at the European Cup triathlon in Antalya, 2011.

Andrey Alexandrovich Bryukhankov (Russian Андрей Александрович Брюханков, in ITU rankings also misspelled as Brukhankov, born 27 February 1991 in Rybinsk) is a Russian professional triathlete, bronze medalist at the Russian Elite Aquathlon Championships and bronze medalist at the Russian U23 Triathlon Championships of the year 2011, and a member of the Russian National Team. Andrey's elder brother is the Russian Triathlon Champion of the year 2011 Alexander Bryukhankov.

On 12 October 2010, he was honored with the prestigious title Master of Sports (Мастер спорта России) Andrey Bryukhankov also takes part in non ITU elite competitions. At the Volkswagen Aldiana Triathlon in Cyprus, in which most of the Russian elite triathletes took part, he placed fourth in the sprint category.

In 2010, Andrey Bryukhankov also took part in two triathlons of the prestigious French Club Championship Series Lyonnaise des Eaux and, like his elder brother Alexander Bryukhankov, he represented Mulhouse Olympique Tri. At the Triathlon de Paris (18 July 2010), he placed 45th in the individual ranking. At the Grand Final in La Baule (Triathlon Audencia, 18 September 2010), Andrey Bryukhankov placed 40th.

== ITU Competitions ==
In the five years from 2006 to 2010, Andrey Bryukhankov took part in 15 ITU competitions and achieved 7 top ten positions. In 2010, for instance, he won the silver medal at the European Championships (Junior) and two medals at the Junior European Cup. From 2009 on Andrey Bryukhankov has also taken part in Elite triathlons.

The following list is based upon the official ITU rankings and the ITU Athletes's Profile Page. Unless indicated otherwise, the following events are triathlons (Olympic Distance) and refer to the Elite category.

Date	Competition	Place	Rank
2006-10-18	Junior European Cup	Alanya	25
2007-10-24	Junior European Cup	Alanya	4
2008-05-10	European Championships (Junior)	Lisbon	35
2008-06-05	World Championships (Junior)	Vancouver	46
2008-10-26	Junior European Cup	Alanya	3
2009-07-02	European Championships (Junior)	Holten	20
2009-08-08	Junior European Cup	Tiszaújváros	7
2009-09-09	Dextro Energy World Championship Series, Grand Final: Junior World Championships	Gold Coast	8
2009-10-25	Premium European Cup	Alanya	31
2010-05-22	European Cup	Senec	13
2010-07-03	European Championships (Junior)	Athlone	2
2010-08-01	Junior European Cup	Tabor	2
2010-08-28	European Championships (U23)	Vila Nova de Gaia (Porto)	34
2010-09-08	Dextro Energy World Championship Series, Grand Final: Junior World Championships	Budapest	22
2010-10-24	Junior European Cup	Alanya	1
2011-04-03	European Cup	Antalya	28
2011-07-03	European Cup	Penza	9
