= Tony Moulai =

French triathlete

Personal information
- Born: 17 January 1976 (age 50) Saint-Nazaire, France
- Height: 1.78 m (5 ft 10 in)
- Weight: 68 kg (150 lb)

Sport
- Country: France
- Team: Poissy Triathlon
Medal record
Triathlon
Representing France
ITU Triathlon World Cup
Silver medal – second place	2008 Lorient	Men's competition
ITU Team Triathlon World Championships
Silver medal – second place	2012 Stockholm	Mixed relay

Tony Moulai (born 17 January 1976 in Saint-Nazaire) is a triathlete from France. Moulai has won three silver medals in his entire sporting career, including one for mixed team relay, and is currently ranked no. 13 in the world by the International Triathlon Union. He is also a member of the Poissy Triathlon team.

Moulai started out as a football player for seven years, until he began with triathlon in 1992. He first competed at both local and national elite championships within a span of ten years in his career, and eventually reached into the international level at his first ITU Triathlon World Cup in Cancun, Mexico in 2004. During the course of his career, Moulay has further improved on his athletic abilities and physical training after he performed poorly in his first few competitions, and in 2006, he finished astoundingly in twenty-fourth place at the ITU World Championships in Lausanne, Switzerland. Following his success, he was able to achieve four top ten finishes at the ITU World Triathlon Cup, including his third-place finish in New Plymouth, New Zealand, and eventually placed into the top twenty world ranking.

Moulai was selected to the French team for the 2008 Summer Olympics in Beijing; however, he did not finish the entire run in the men's event. Despite his disappointing finish at the Olympics, Moulai continued to win other triathlon events, by capturing the silver medal at the ITU European Championships in Lisbon, Portugal, and receiving his best result at the ITU World Championships, when he finished eighth overall in Vancouver.

Moulai retired in 2014 and works now as a sports teacher.
