= Alexandra Razarenova =

Russian triathlete (born 1990)

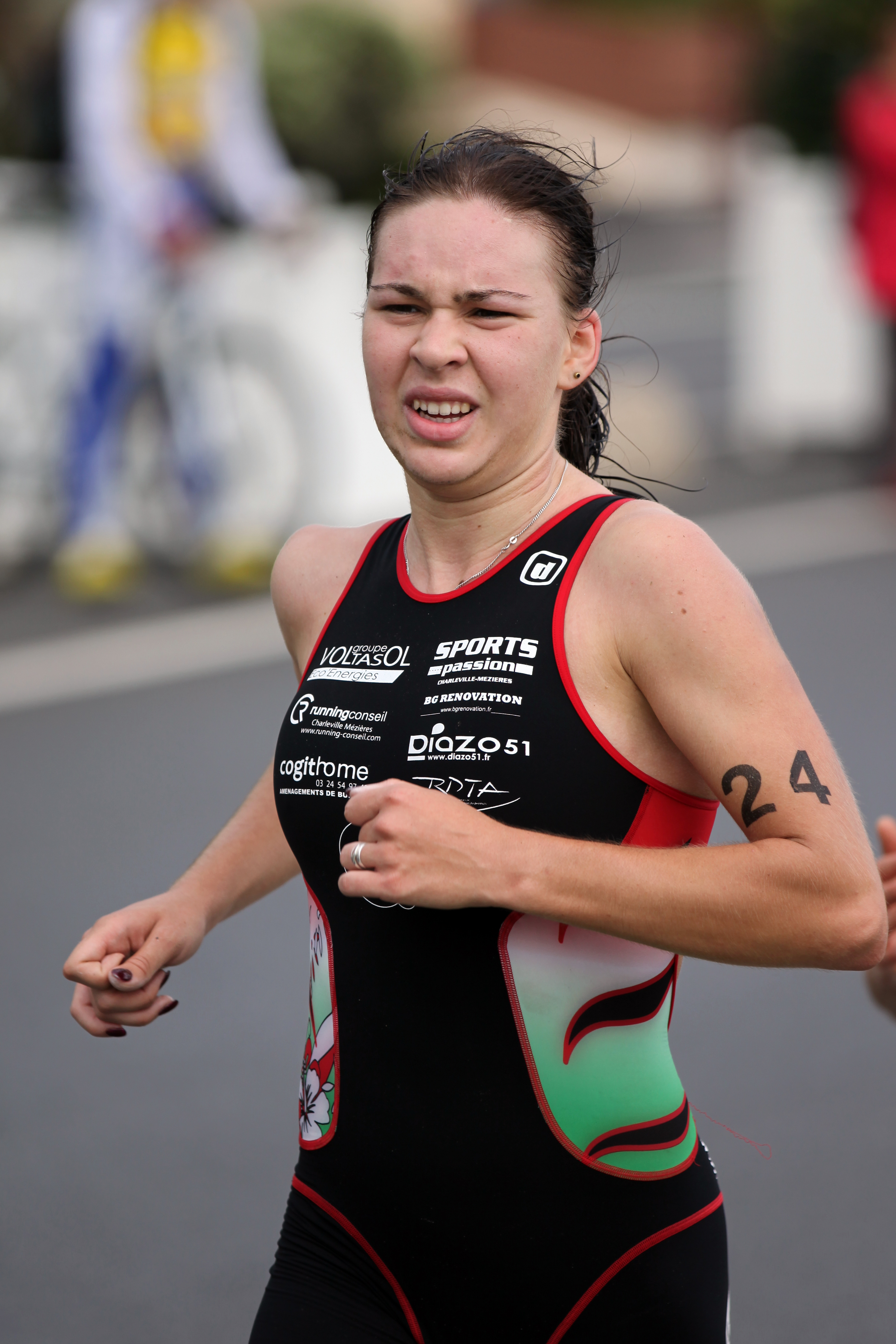
- Alexandra Razarenova at the Grand Final in La Baule, 2011.

Personal information
- Nationality: Russian
- Born: 17 July 1990 (age 35) Saint Petersburg

Sport
- Country: Russia
- Sport: Triathlon

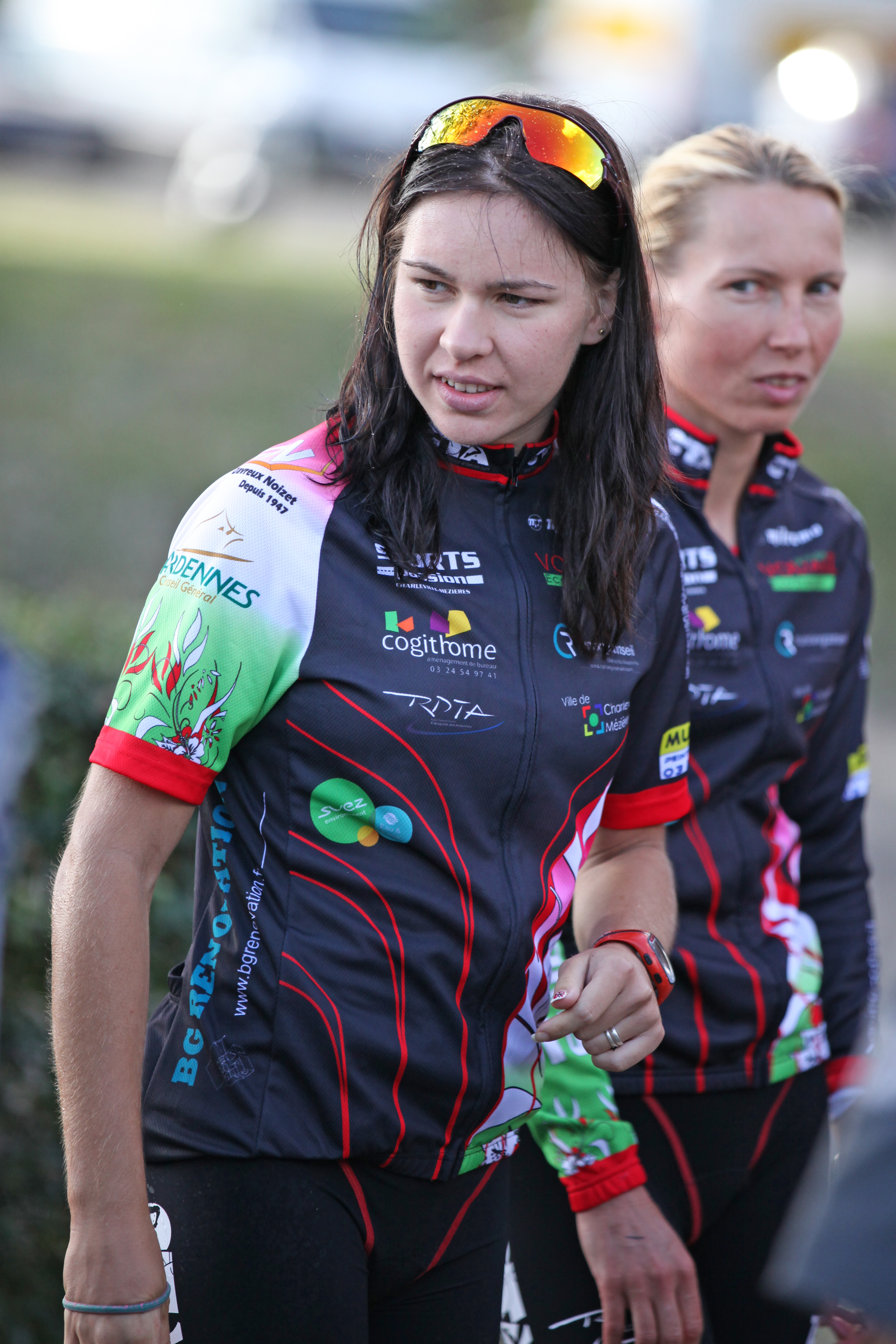
Alexandra Razarenova with Anja Dittmer at the Grand Prix triathlon in Tours, 2011.

Alexandra Razarenova (or Razaryonova, Russian: Александра Германовна Разарёнова, born 17 July 1990 in Saint Petersburg) is a Russian professional triathlete, member of the Russian National Elite Team, Russian Elite Champion of the year 2011, and European U23 Champion of the year 2011. She competed in the women's event at the 2012 Summer Olympics, 2016 Summer Olympics and 2020 Summer Olympics.

== Sports career ==
Razarenova attended an elite sports school in St. Petersburg (Училище олимпийского резерва No. 1) and started her international career in 2005 when, at the age of 15, she took part in an ITU Elite race in Alanya. From 2006 to 2009, she attended five Junior European Cup triathlons and always achieved top ten positions, among which three gold medals. In 2009, she placed 4th in the Junior European Championships and 5th in the Junior World Championships. In 2010, she placed 5th in the U23 World Championships and in 2011 she won the U23 European Championships. From 2010 on Razarenova has represented Russia in the World Championship Series. In the World Championship Series Rankings 2011 she was number 62 and thus the second best Russian female triathlete behind Irina Abysova.

== French Club Championship Series ==
In 2011, Razarenova also took part in the prestigious Club Championship Series D1 Lyonnaise des Eaux representing Charleville Tri Ardennes (CTA). In Paris (9 July 2011), Razarenova placed 16th (CTA's three triathlètes classants l'equipe being Emma Moffatt, Sarah Groff and Anja Dittmer), at the Grand Final in La Baule (17 September 2011) she placed 6th and was the best athlete of her club. For the triathlon in Tours there are no individual rankings available and at the opening triathlon in Nice (24 April 2011) Razarenova did not start (DNS), i.e. her club should have been disqualified because there were not five triathletes participating in the race but only four (Holland, Rabie, Delphine Py-Bilot, Letot).

== ITU Competitions ==
In the six years from 2005 to 2010, Razarenova took part in 27 ITU competitions and achieved 16 top ten positions.

The following list is based upon the official ITU rankings and the ITU Athletes's Profile Page. Unless indicated otherwise, the following events are triathlons (Olympic Distance) and refer to the Elite category.

Date	Competition	Place	Rank
2005-10-26	Premium European Cup	Alanya	29
2006-10-18	Junior European Cup	Alanya	3
2007-10-24	Junior European Cup	Alanya	7
2008-05-10	European Championships (Junior)	Lisbon	19
2008-06-28	Junior European Cup	Holten	3
2008-09-06	Junior European Cup	Pulpí	1
2008-09-27	Duathlon World Championships (Junior)	Rimini	5
2008-10-26	Junior European Cup	Alanya	1
2009-06-20	Junior European Cup	Tarzo Revine	1
2009-07-02	European Championships (Junior)	Holten	4
2009-08-02	European Cup	Egirdir	7
2009-09-09	Dextro Energy World Championship Series, Grand Final: Junior World Championships	Gold Coast	5
2009-10-25	Premium European Cup	Alanya	7
2010-03-26	Asian Cup	Mekong River	1
2010-04-11	European Cup	Quarteira	DQ
2010-05-08	Dextro Energy World Championship Series	Seoul	31
2010-06-05	Dextro Energy World Championship Series	Madrid	51
2010-07-03	European Championships	Athlone	7
2010-07-10	World Cup	Holten	14
2010-07-17	Dextro Energy World Championship Series	Hamburg	30
2010-08-08	World Cup	Tiszaújváros	9
2010-08-14	Dextro Energy World Championship Series	Kitzbuhel	22
2010-08-28	European Championships (U23)	Vila Nova de Gaia (Porto)	DNF
2010-09-08	Dextro Energy World Championship Series, Grand Final: U23 World Championships	Budapest	5
2010-10-10	World Cup	Huatulco	8
2010-10-16	World Cup	Tongyeong	13
2010-10-24	Premium European Cup	Alanya	DNF
2011-03-26	World Cup	Mooloolaba	22
2011-04-09	Dextro Energy World Championship Series	Sydney	30
2011-05-15	Asian Cup	Seoul	4
2011-04-09	Dextro Energy World Championship Series	Kitzbuhel	46
2011-06-24	European Championships	Pontevedra	DNF
2011-07-16	Dextro Energy World Championship Series	Hamburg	43
2011-08-14	World Cup	Tiszaújváros	19
2011-09-09	Dextro Energy World Championship Series, Grand Final	Beijing	47
2011-10-15	World Cup	Tongyeong	20
2011-10-28	European Championships (U23)	Eilat	1

DNF = did not finish • DNS = did not start • DQ = disqualified
