= Hollie Avil =

English triathlete (born 1990)

Personal information
- Born: 12 April 1990 (age 35); Northampton, England
- Height: 1.76 m (5 ft 9 in)

Sport
- Country: Great Britain
- Club: Northampton Swimming Club; Rugby and Northampton AC; Beauvais Triathlon Club
- Coached by: Ben Bright; Mark Perry (swimming)

Hollie May Avil (born 12 April 1990) is an English former triathlete who was the European and World junior triathlon champion in 2007 and U23 World Champion in 2009. She is the youngest athlete ever to be on the podium at successive debut World Cup races and the youngest triathlete to have ever been ranked World Number One at only 18 years old. Still to this day, Avil is the youngest triathlete to have competed in the Olympic Games.

In 2007 Avil was shortlisted for BBC Young Sports Personality of the year. In 2008, she was crowned British Olympic Association Triathlete of the Year.

Avil competed in triathlon at the 2008 Summer Olympics but did not finish the race. Like her coach, Bright's, other athlete, Tim Don, she suffered a sickness that caused her continual vomiting and weakness during the race. During the bike section, Avil had to retire.

Avil started her degree at Loughborough University shortly after her Olympic journey in summer of 2008. Her 2009 season started with disappointment at the Madrid World Championship Series as she failed to finish the race due to mechanical problems with her bike. However, Avil's 2009 season ended on a high as she was crowned U23 World Champion on the Gold Coast, Australia.

In December 2011, Avil was one of 12 British female sporting celebrities who posed for Clara Maidment a charity calendar in aid of Wellbeing of Women, in the lingerie of Nichole de Carle, wearing jewellery by Salima Hughes and Coster Diamonds.

In May 2012, Avil announced her retirement from competitive sport following her recovery from an eating disorder.

In late 2012 Avil moved to Singapore to pursue a career in sports marketing and event management.

Avil works as a relationship manager for Manchester United, for three years based in Hong Kong, returning in 2019 to rejoin UK operations.
