= Ivan Vasiliev (triathlete) =

Russian triathlete

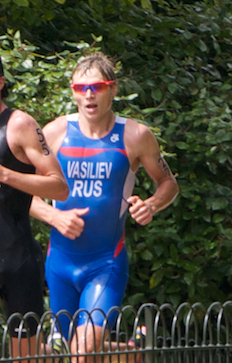
- Olympics, London 2012

Personal information
- Born: 7 September 1984 (age 41) Kostroma, Russia
Medal record
Men's triathlon
Representing Russia
European Championships
Gold medal – first place	2013 Alanya	Elite
Bronze medal – third place	2012 Eliat	Elite

Ivan Vasiliev (born 7 September 1984 in Kostroma) is a Russian triathlete.

At the 2012 Summer Olympics men's triathlon on Tuesday 7 August he placed 13th.
