= Carole Péon =

French triathlete (born 1978)

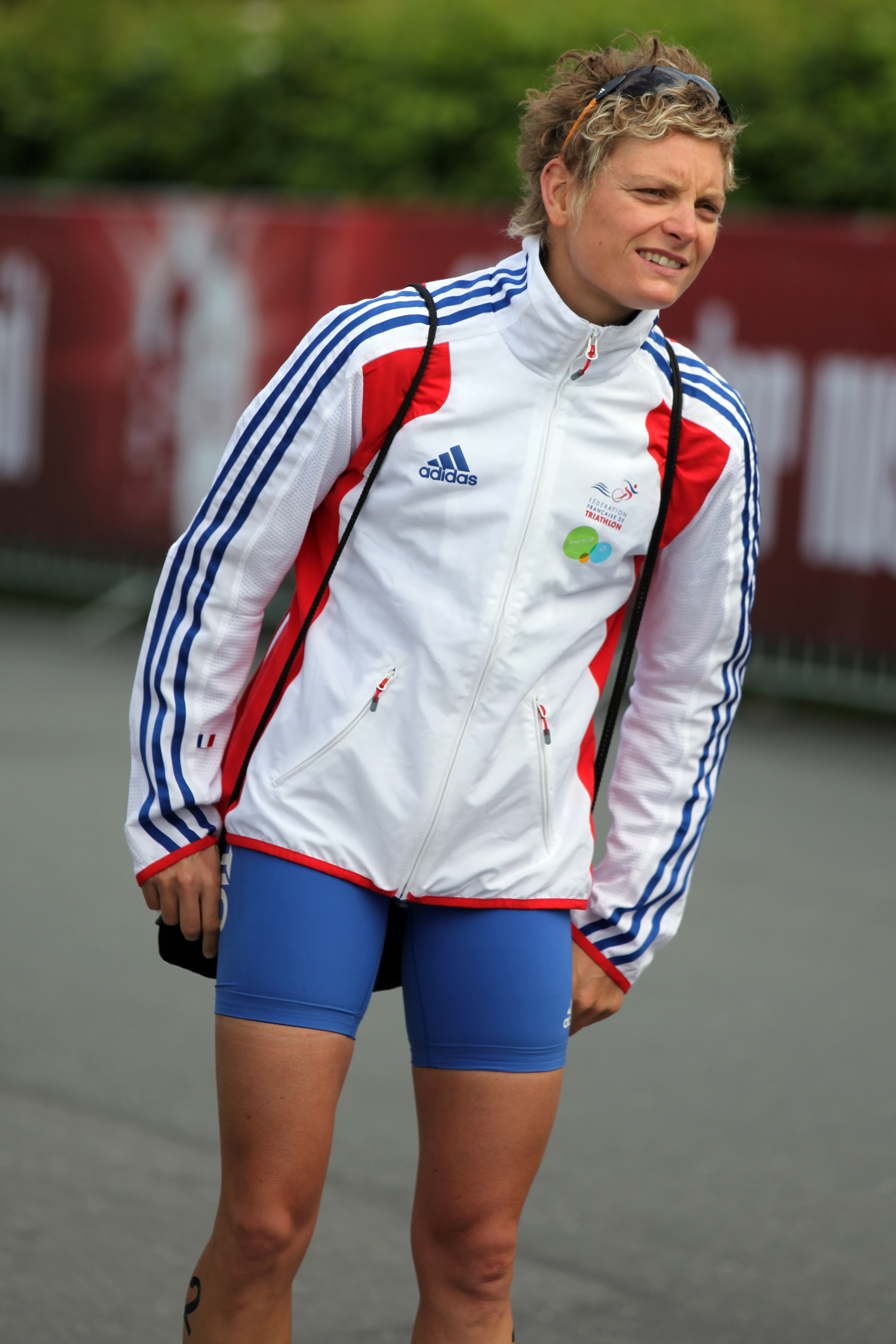

Personal information
- Born: 4 November 1978 (age 47) Nice, France

Sport
- Sport: Triathlon
Medal record
Triathlon
Representing France
ITU Team Triathlon World Championships
Silver medal – second place	2012	Team

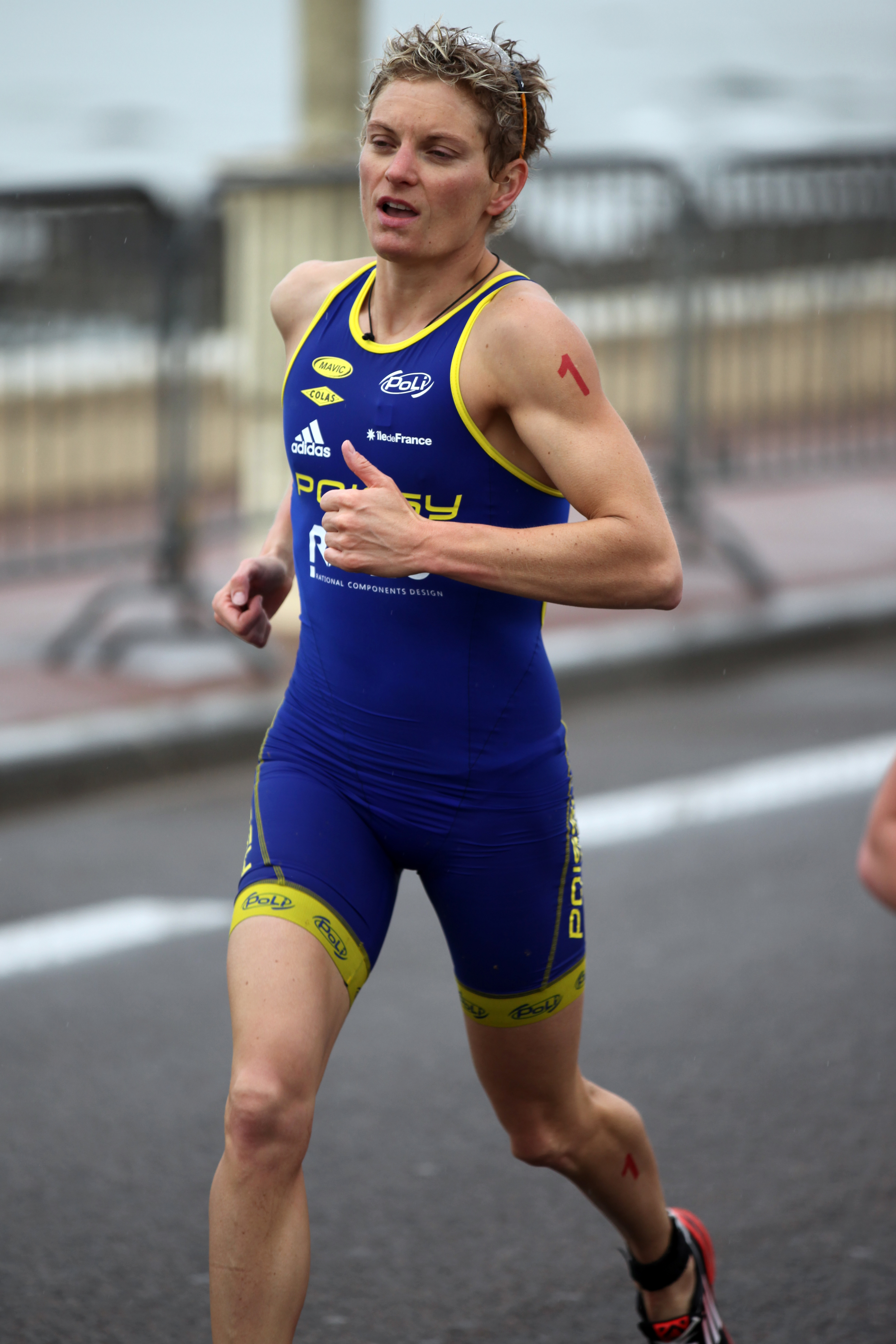
Carole Péon at the Grand Prix de Triathlon in Les Sables d'Olonne, 2012.

Carole Péon (born 4 November 1978) is a French triathlete. She competed at the 2008 and 2012 Summer Olympics. She is openly lesbian and in 2005 began a relationship with fellow French triathlete Jessica Harrison.
