= Jessica Harrison (triathlete) =

French triathlete

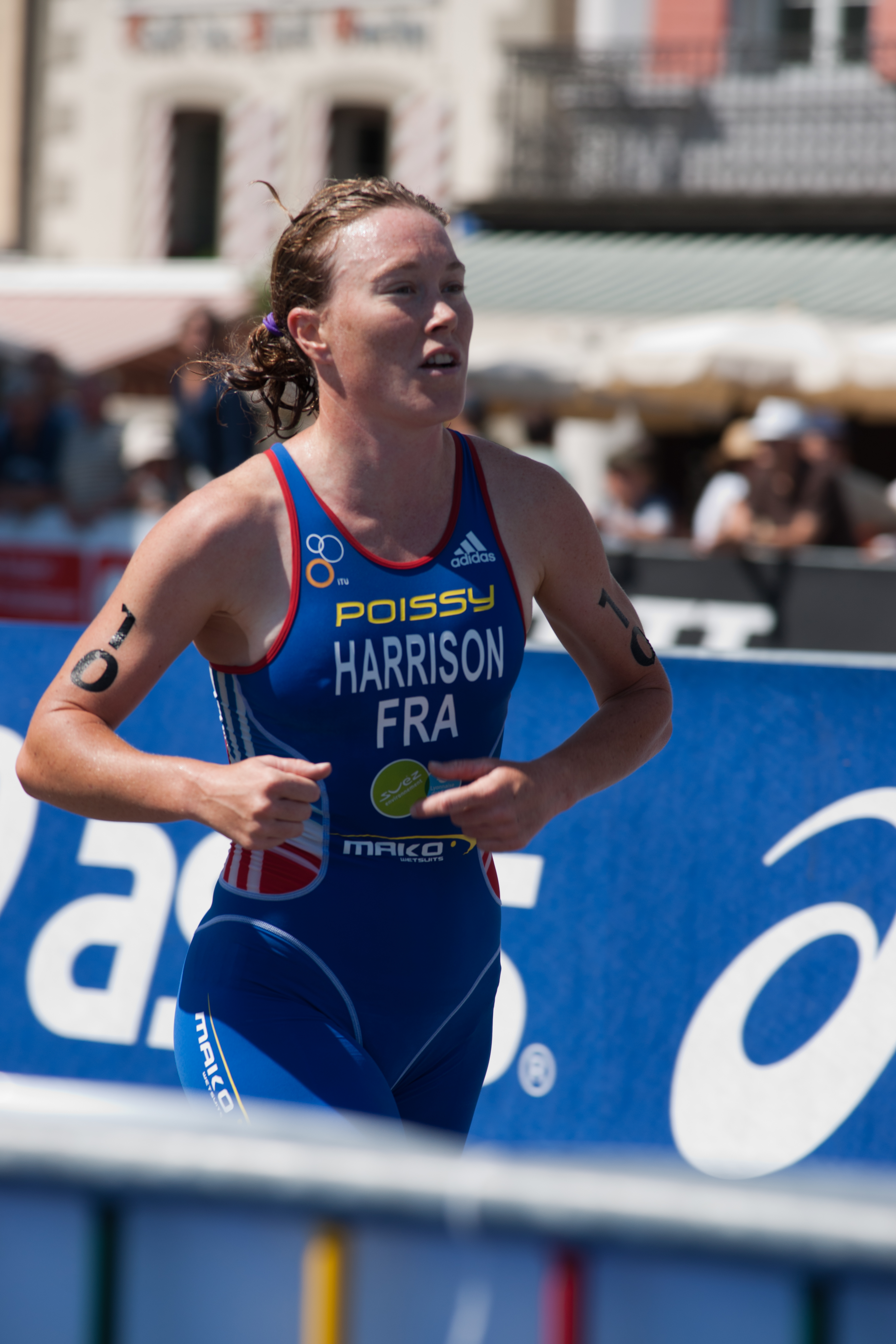

Personal information
- Born: 27 October 1977 (age 49) Sheffield, England

Sport
- Sport: Triathlon
Medal record
Triathlon
Representing France
ITU Team Triathlon World Championships
Silver medal – second place	2012	Team

Jessica Harrison (born 27 October 1977) is a British-born French triathlete. She competed at the 2008 and 2012 Summer Olympics.

Born in Sheffield, 1977 to Gill (née Papworth) and John Harrison, She is openly lesbian and in 2005 began a relationship with fellow French triathlete Carole Péon.

Harrison announced that she was retiring from international competition after the Grand Final of the 2013 ITU World Triathlon Series held in London on 14 September. However, she returned to competition for the 2014 Abu Dhabi International Triathlon where she finished fifth in the short-distance race.
