= Alexander Bryukhankov =

Russian triathlete (born 1987)

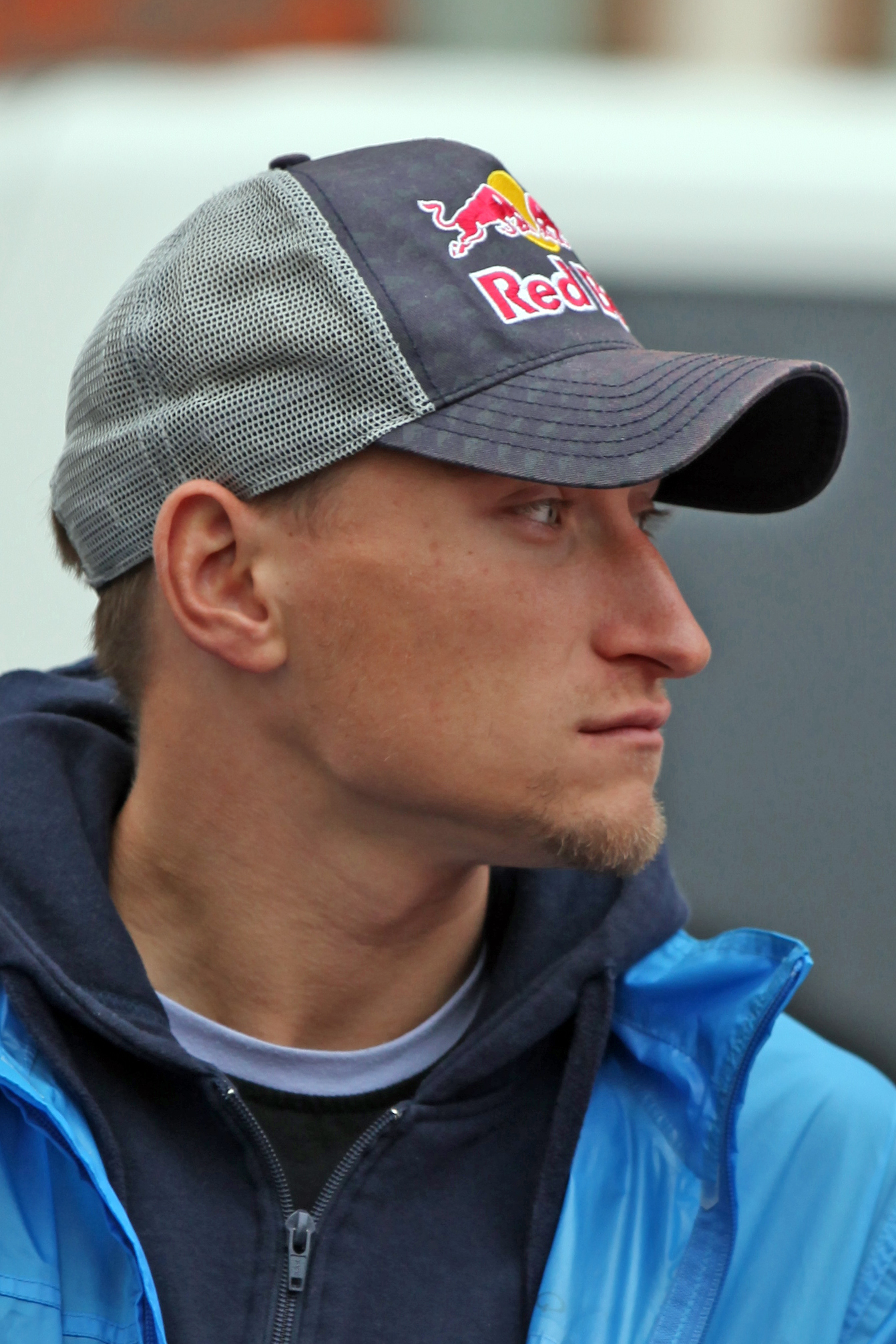
- Bryukhankov watching the Junior European Cup in Tabor, 2011.

Personal information
- Native name: Александр Александрович Брюханков
- Born: 12 April 1987 (age 39) Rybinsk, Russian SFSR, Soviet Union
Medal record
Men's triathlon
Representing Russia
European Championships
Silver medal – second place	2012 Eliat	Elite
Bronze medal – third place	2009 Holten	Elite

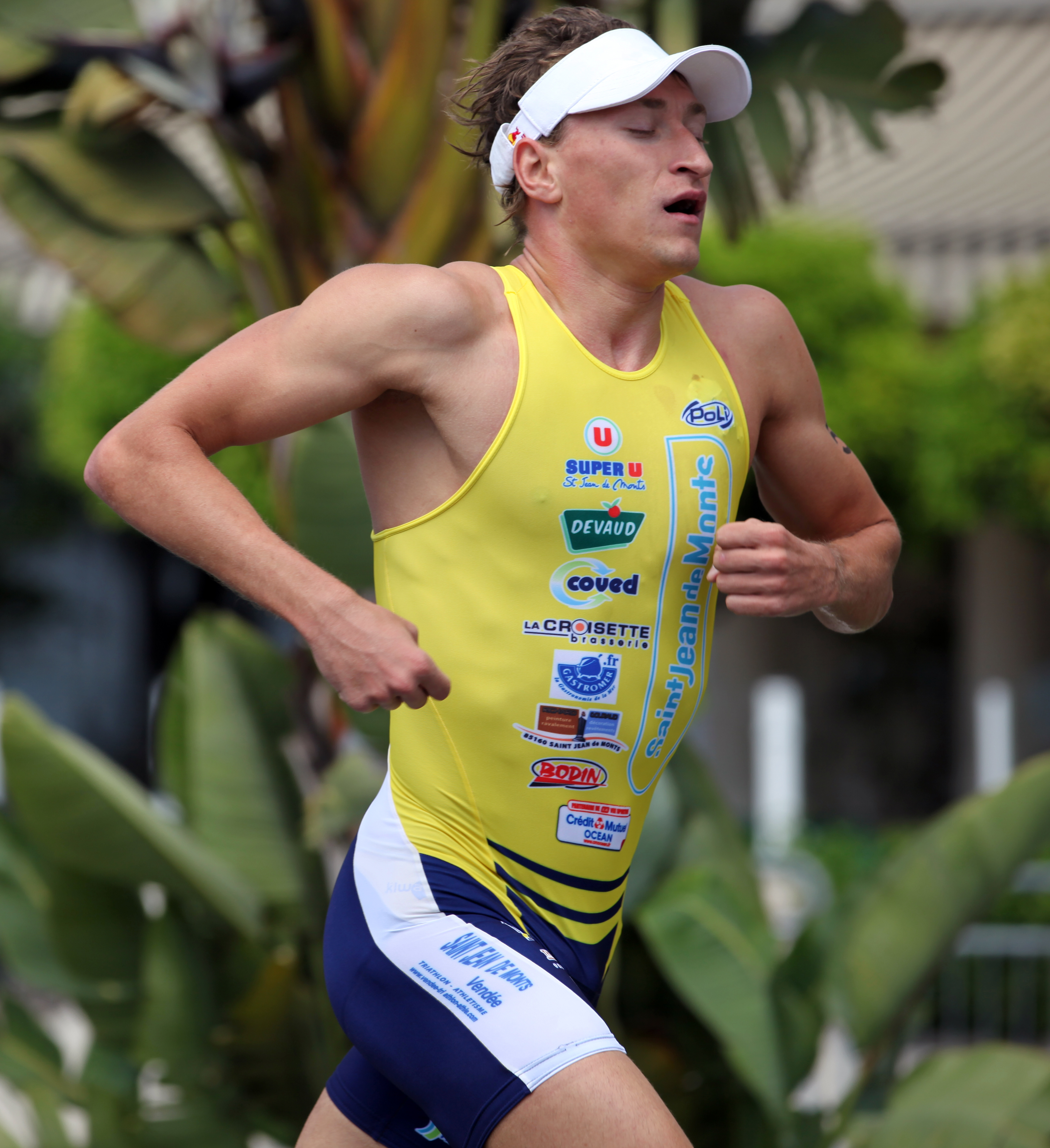
Bryukhankov at the Grand Prix triathlon in Nice, 2011.

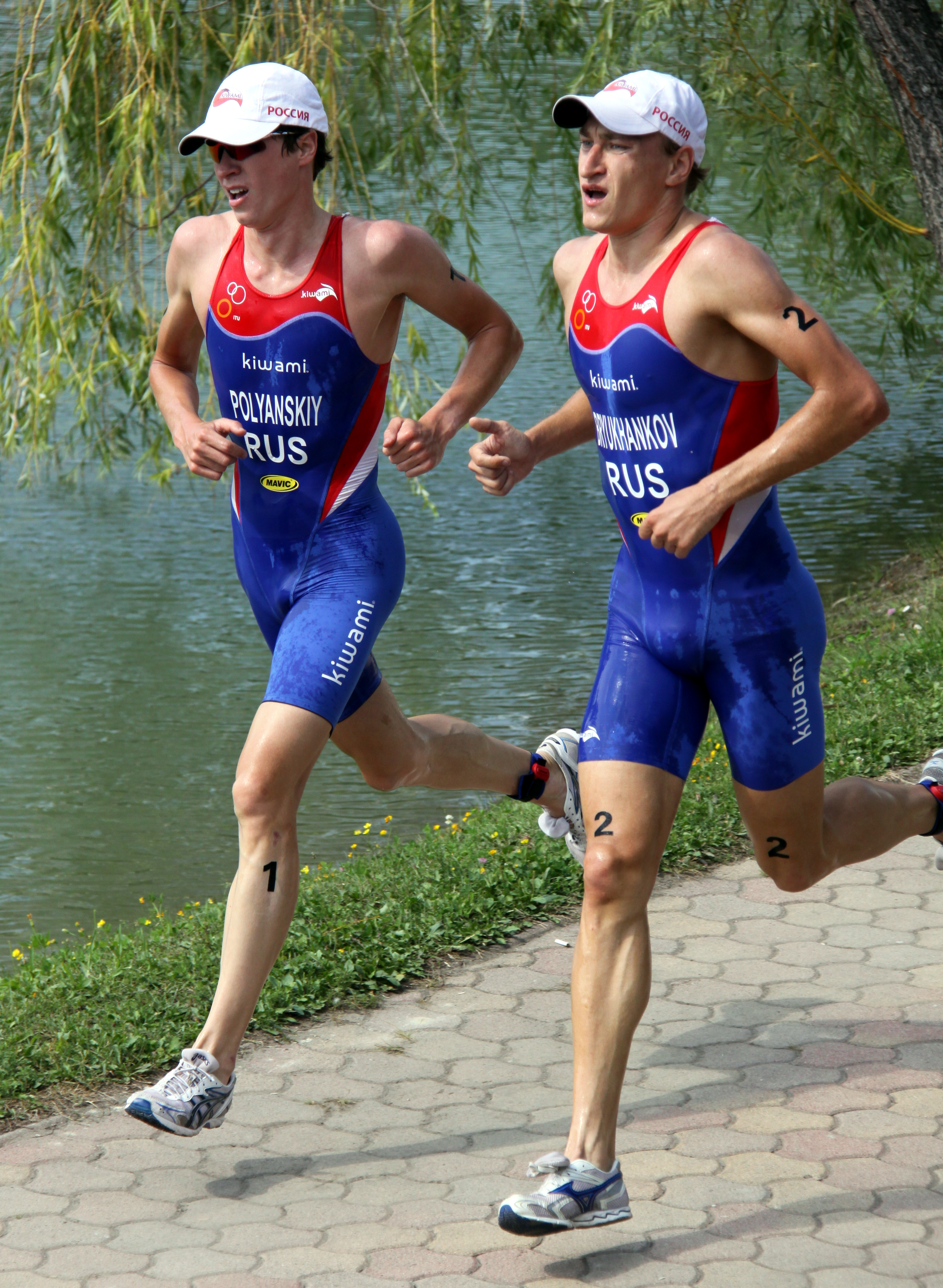
Brykhankov with Dmitry Polyanski in Tiszaújváros, 2009.

Alexander Alexandrovich Bryukhankov (Russian: Александр Александрович Брюханков; born 12 April 1987 in Rybinsk) is a Russian professional triathlete, Russian Elite Champion of the year 2011, 2008 and 2012 Olympian, and a member of the Russian National Team. Alexander Brykhankov is the elder brother of Andrey Bryukhankov.

According to the Men's Standing (9 September 2010), Bryukhankov was number 3 in 2010. In 2011, Bryukhankov won the bronze medal at the European Championships and in the World Championship Series 2011 ranking he is number 2.

Alexander Bryukhankov also took part in the French Club Championship Series Lyonnaise des Eaux. In 2011, he represented St Jean de Monts Vendee. At the opening triathlon in Nice (24 April 2011) he placed 9th. In 2010, Bryukhankov represented Mulhouse Olympique Tri. At the opening triathlon in Dunkirk (23 May 2010), Bryukhankov placed 21st. At Beauvais, Paris and Tourangeaux Bryukhankov did not take part. At Paris, his brother Andrey Bryukhankov represented Alexander Bryukhankov's club Mulhouse and placed 45th, at the Grand Final he placed 40th.

== ITU Competitions ==
In the six years from 2006 to 2010, Alexander Bryukhankov took part in 55 ITU competitions and achieved 34 top ten positions. The following list is based upon the official ITU rankings and the ITU Athletes's Profile Page. Unless indicated otherwise, the following events are triathlons (Olympic Distance) and refer to the Elite category.

Date	Competition	Place	Rank
2005-07-23	European Championships (Junior)	Alexandroupoli(s)	22
2005-07-24	European Championships (Junior Relay)	Alexandroupoli(s)	3
2005-09-10	World Championships (Junior)	Gamagori	24
2005-10-26	Premium European Cup	Alanya	25
2006-03-10	World Cup	Aqaba	18
2006-06-04	BG World Cup	Madrid	49
2006-06-23	European Championships (Junior)	Autun	2
2006-07-08	European Championships (U23)	Rijeka	22
2006-07-30	BG World Cup	Salford	39
2006-09-02	World Championships (Junior)	Lausanne	2
2006-10-18	Premium European Cup	Alanya	16
2007-01-21	Pan American Cup	La Paz	2
2007-01-28	Pan American Cup	Villarrica	4
2007-03-25	BG World Cup	Mooloolaba	43
2007-05-06	BG World Cup	Lisbon	16
2007-05-13	BG World Cup	Richards Bay	3
2007-06-10	BG World Cup	Vancouver	4
2007-06-17	BG World Cup	Des Moines	14
2007-06-24	BG World Cup	Edmonton	2
2007-06-29	European Championships	Copenhagen	DNS
2007-07-21	European Championships (U23)	Kuopio	2
2007-07-29	BG World Cup	Salford	7
2007-08-11	BG World Cup	Tiszaújváros	14
2007-08-30	BG World Championships (U23)	Hamburg	9
2007-09-15	BG World Cup	Beijing	34
2007-11-04	BG World Cup	Cancun	9
2007-12-01	BG World Cup	Eilat	3
2008-04-13	BG World Cup	Ishigaki	7
2008-04-26	BG World Cup	Tongyeong	DNF
2008-05-10	European Championships	Lisbon	17
2008-06-05	BG World Championships (U23)	Vancouver	5
2008-07-20	BG World Cup	Kitzbuhel	9
2008-08-18	Olympic Games	Beijing	24
2008-09-06	European Championships (U23)	Pulpí	DNF
2009-04-05	European Cup	Quarteira	2
2009-05-02	Dextro Energy World Championship Series	Tongyeong	7
2009-05-31	Dextro Energy World Championship Series	Madrid	6
2009-06-20	European Championships (U23)	Tarzo Revine	3
2009-07-02	European Championships	Holten	3
2009-07-11	Dextro Energy World Championship Series	Kitzbuhel	DNF
2009-07-25	Dextro Energy World Championship Series	Hamburg	3
2009-08-09	World Cup	Tiszaújváros	2
2009-08-15	Dextro Energy World Championship Series	London	15
2009-09-09	Dextro Energy World Championship Series, Grand Final	Gold Coast	10
2009-10-25	Premium European Cup	Alanya	2
2010-04-11	Dextro Energy World Championship Series	Sydney	2
2010-05-08	Dextro Energy World Championship Series	Seoul	5
2010-06-05	Dextro Energy World Championship Series	Madrid	10
2010-06-12	Elite Cup	Hy-Vee	11
2010-07-03	European Championships	Athlone	7
2010-07-17	Dextro Energy World Championship Series	Hamburg	9
2010-07-24	Dextro Energy World Championship Series	London	4
2010-08-14	Dextro Energy World Championship Series	Kitzbuhel	11
2010-08-28	European Championships (U23)	Vila Nova de Gaia (Porto)	3
2010-09-08	Dextro Energy World Championship Series, Grand Final	Budapest	53
2010-10-24	Premium European Cup	Alanya	7
2011-04-09	Dextro Energy World Championship Series	Sydney	14
2011-06-04	Dextro Energy World Championship Series	Madrid	4
2011-06-18	Dextro Energy World Championship Series	Kitzbuhel	2
2011-06-24	European Championships	Pontevedra	DNF
2011-07-03	European Cup	Penza	1

BG = the sponsor British Gas · DNF = did not finish · DNS = did not start
